= 2000–01 Parma AC season =

Parma
2000–01 season
- Owner: Parmalat
- President: Calisto Tanzi
- Manager: Alberto Malesani (until 8 January 2001); Arrigo Sacchi (until 31 January 2001); Renzo Ulivieri
- Stadium: Ennio Tardini
- Serie A: 4th In (2001-02 UEFA Champions league)
- Coppa Italia: Runners-up
- UEFA Cup: Fourth round
- Top goalscorer: League: Marco Di Vaio (15); All: Marco Di Vaio (20)
- Average home league attendance: 19,009
Home colours	Away colours	Third colours

Parma Associazione Calcio had a moderately strong season in 2000–01, managing to qualify for the UEFA Champions League, but also losing the final of Coppa Italia and dropping out of the UEFA Cup too early for the board's liking, ultimately leading to coach Alberto Malesani being let go during the season.

== Summary ==
2000–01 also marked the first time in four years that Parma had to make do without star striker Hernán Crespo, who left for 2000 champions Lazio in the early summer. Sérgio Conceição and Matías Almeyda arrived from the Rome club as part of the transfer, but as they were midfielders Parma was staring at a potential striking crisis. Marco Di Vaio hit the back of the net 15 times, but Márcio Amoroso continued his miserable display in the Parma shirt, which saw him offloaded to Borussia Dortmund in the summer of 2001.

Still young, superstar goalkeeper Gianluigi Buffon played out his final season with the club, along with defender Lilian Thuram. Both were sold to Juventus in the summer, and their absence was clearly felt in the 2001–02 season. 2001 remains the last time Parma qualified for the Champions League.

== Players ==
=== Squad information ===
Squad at end of season

Note: Flags indicate national team as defined under FIFA eligibility rules; some limited exceptions apply. Players may hold more than one non-FIFA nationality.

No.	Pos.	Nation	Player
1	GK	ITA	Davide Micillo
2	DF	ITA	Luigi Sartor
3	DF	ITA	Antonio Benarrivo
4	MF	GHA	Stephen Appiah
5	DF	ITA	Stefano Torrisi
6	DF	ARG	Roberto Sensini
7	MF	ITA	Diego Fuser
8	MF	FRA	Sabri Lamouchi
9	FW	YUG	Savo Milošević
10	FW	BRA	Márcio Amoroso
11	MF	POR	Sérgio Conceição
14	MF	FRA	Alain Boghossian
16	DF	BRA	Júnior
17	DF	ITA	Fabio Cannavaro
18	MF	FRA	Johan Micoud
20	FW	ITA	Marco Di Vaio
21	DF	FRA	Lilian Thuram

No.	Pos.	Nation	Player
25	MF	ARG	Matías Almeyda
26	FW	COL	Johnnier Montaño
28	DF	ITA	Paolo Cannavaro
29	MF	COL	Jorge Bolaño
30	FW	ITA	Simone Basso
31	MF	ITA	Alessio D'Imporzano
32	DF	ITA	Carlalberto Ludi
33	DF	ITA	Gianluca Falsini
34	FW	ITA	Saverio Guarinello
35	MF	ITA	Manuel Saccani
36	MF	ITA	Francesco Cardillo
37	DF	ITA	Davide Stirpe
38	DF	GUI	Alain Roger Bangoura
70	FW	CMR	Patrick Mboma
77	GK	ITA	Gianluigi Buffon
99	GK	ITA	Matteo Guardalben

=== Left club during season ===
Note: Flags indicate national team as defined under FIFA eligibility rules; some limited exceptions apply. Players may hold more than one non-FIFA nationality.

No.	Pos.	Nation	Player
6	MF	ITA	Dino Baggio (to Lazio)
13	MF	ITA	Giampiero Maini (on loan to Vicenza)

No.	Pos.	Nation	Player
23	MF	ITA	Pietro Strada (to Cosenza)
24	FW	ITA	Emiliano Bonazzoli (on loan to Hellas Verona)

=== Transfers ===
In
Pos.	Name	from	Type
FW	Savo Milošević	Real Zaragoza	€25,000,000
MF	Sérgio Conceição	SS Lazio	€14,696,000
MF	Matías Almeyda	SS Lazio	€14,696,000
MF	Roberto Sensini	SS Lazio	
MF	Stephen Appiah	Udinese	
FW	Patrick Mboma	Cagliari	
MF	Sabri Lamouchi	Monaco	
DF	Júnior	Palmeiras	
MF	Johan Micoud	Bordeaux	
FW	Emiliano Bonazzoli	Brescia	
DF	Gianluca Falsini	Hellas Verona	

Out
Pos.	Name	To	Type
FW	Hernán Crespo	Lazio	€25,696,000
FW	Mario Stanić	Chelsea	€8,960,000
FW	Ariel Ortega	River Plate	€5,681,029.99
MF	Dino Baggio	Lazio	€5,164,572.72
MF	Roberto Breda	Genoa	
DF	Luigi Apolloni	Hellas Verona	
MF	Pietro Strada	Cosenza	
MF	Ousmane Dabo	Monaco	
DF	Paolo Vanoli	Fiorentina	
MF	Johan Walem	Udinese	
DF	Michele Serena	Internazionale	
DF	Saliou Lassissi	Fiorentina	loan
MF	Davide Zoboli	Benevento	loan
MF	Raffaele Longo	Vicenza	loan
FW	Emiliano Bonazzoli	Hellas Verona	loan

== Competitions ==
=== Overall ===
Competition	Started round	Current position	Final position	First match	Last match
Serie A	Matchday 1	—	4th	1 October 2000	17 June 2001
Coppa Italia	Round of 16	—	Runners-up	17 September 2000	13 June 2001
UEFA Cup	First round	—	Fourth round	14 September 2000	22 February 2001

Last updated: 17 June 2001

=== Serie A ===
==== League table ====
Pos	Team	Pld	W	D	L	GF	GA	GD	Pts	Qualification or relegation
2	Juventus	34	21	10	3	61	27	+34	73	Qualification to Champions League first group stage
3	Lazio	34	21	6	7	65	36	+29	69	Qualification to Champions League third qualifying round
4	Parma	34	16	8	10	51	31	+20	56	Qualification to Champions League third qualifying round
5	Internazionale	34	14	9	11	47	47	0	51	Qualification to UEFA Cup first round
6	Milan	34	12	13	9	56	46	+10	49	Qualification to UEFA Cup first round

Source: 2000–01 Serie A, Soccerway, RSSSF.com
Rules for classification: 1) Points; 2) Head-to-head points; 3) Head-to-head goal difference; 4) Goal difference; 5) Goals scored; 6) Draw. (Note: Head-to-head record is used only after all the matches between the teams in question have been played).

==== Results summary ====
Overall								Home						Away					
Pld	W	D	L	GF	GA	GD	Pts	W	D	L	GF	GA	GD	W	D	L	GF	GA	GD
34	16	8	10	51	31	+20	56	9	4	4	32	12	+20	7	4	6	19	19	0

Last updated: 17 June 2001.
Source: Competitive matches

==== Results by round ====
Round	1	2	3	4	5	6	7	8	9	10	11	12	13	14	15	16	17	18	19	20	21	22	23	24	25	26	27	28	29	30	31	32	33	34
Ground	H	A	A	H	A	H	A	H	H	A	H	A	H	A	H	A	H	A	H	H	A	H	A	H	A	A	H	A	H	A	H	A	H	A
Result	D	D	L	W	W	W	L	W	W	L	L	D	L	D	D	W	L	W	W	W	D	W	W	D	L	W	D	W	W	L	W	W	L	L
Position	6	11	14	9	7	4	7	6	3	6	6	8	10	8	9	8	11	6	5	4	4	4	4	4	4	4	4	4	4	4	4	4	4	4

Source: Competitive matches
A = Away; H = Home; W = Win; D = Draw; L = Loss; P = Postponed; = Leader, 2001–02 UEFA Champions League Group stage; = 2001–02 UEFA Champions League Group stage; = 2001–02 UEFA Champions League Qualifying round; = 2001–02 UEFA Cup First round; = Qualification to Intertoto Cup; = 2001–02 Serie B

==== Matches ====
1 October 2000 1	Parma	2–2	Fiorentina	Parma
	M. Amoroso 5', 90+2' (pen.)	Report	Pierini 65'; C. Amoroso 82'	Stadium: Stadio Ennio Tardini; Attendance: 17,187; Referee: Domenico Messina

15 October 2000 2	Brescia	0–0	Parma	Brescia
		Report		Stadium: Stadio Mario Rigamonti; Attendance: 13,291; Referee: Danilo Nucini

22 October 2000 3	Perugia	3–1	Parma	Perugia
	Bucchi 4'; Materazzi 11'; Tedesco 20'	Report	Micoud 79'	Stadium: Stadio Renato Curi; Attendance: 7,690; Referee: Angelo Bonfrisco

1 November 2000 4	Parma	2–0	Milan	Parma
	Mboma 5', 66'	Report		Stadium: Stadio Ennio Tardini; Attendance: 20,297; Referee: Graziano Cesari

5 November 2000 5	Bari	0–1	Parma	Bari
		Report	Mboma 87'	Stadium: Stadio San Nicola; Attendance: 11,351; Referee: Angelo Bonfrisco

12 November 2000 6	Parma	2–0	Udinese	Parma
	Lamouchi 84'; Micoud 90'	Report		Stadium: Stadio Ennio Tardini; Attendance: 14,872; Referee: Gennaro Borriello

19 November 2000 7	Bologna	2–1	Parma	Bologna
	Nervo 56'; Cruz 84'	Report	Conceição 61'	Stadium: Stadio Renato Dall'Ara; Attendance: 23,280; Referee: Pasquale Rodomonti

26 November 2000 8	Parma	2–0	Lazio	Parma
	Conceição 10'; Lamouchi 90+4'	Report		Stadium: Stadio Ennio Tardini; Attendance: 21,116; Referee: Roberto Rosetti

2 December 2000 9	Parma	2–0	Atalanta	Parma
	Lamouchi 19'; Conceição 83'	Report		Stadium: Stadio Ennio Tardini; Attendance: 16,612; Referee: Nicola Ayroldi

10 December 2000 10	Juventus	1–0	Parma	Turin
	Ferrara 14'	Report		Stadium: Stadio delle Alpi; Attendance: 37,922; Referee: Pierluigi Collina

17 December 2000 11	Parma	0–2	Vicenza	Parma
		Report	Toni 46', 63'	Stadium: Stadio Ennio Tardini; Attendance: 16,278; Referee: Fiorenzo Treossi

23 December 2000 12	Napoli	2–2	Parma	Naples
	Pecchia 47'; Amoruso 81'	Report	Micoud 41'; Milošević 74'	Stadium: Stadio San Paolo; Attendance: 45,724; Referee: Pierluigi Collina

7 January 2001 13	Parma	0–2	Reggina	Parma
		Report	Dionigi 20', 53'	Stadium: Stadio Ennio Tardini; Attendance: 16,189; Referee: Alberto Castellani

14 January 2001 14	Internazionale	1–1	Parma	Milan
	Vieri 70'	Report	Di Vaio 32'	Stadium: San Siro; Attendance: 49,274; Referee: Massimo De Santis

21 January 2001 15	Parma	1–1	Lecce	Parma
	Milošević 52'	Report	Lucarelli 90+4'	Stadium: Stadio Ennio Tardini; Attendance: 18,192; Referee: Gianluca Paparesta

28 January 2001 16	Hellas Verona	0–2	Parma	Verona
		Report	Di Vaio 37', 58'	Stadium: Stadio Marc'Antonio Bentegodi; Attendance: 16,712; Referee: Stefano Cassarà

4 February 2001 17	Parma	1–2	Roma	Parma
	Di Vaio 36'	Report	Batistuta 74', 83'	Stadium: Stadio Ennio Tardini; Attendance: 26,499; Referee: Stefano Farina

11 February 2001 18	Fiorentina	0–1	Parma	Florence
		Report	Conceição 6'	Stadium: Stadio Artemio Franchi; Attendance: 27,494; Referee: Roberto Rosetti

18 February 2001 19	Parma	3–0	Brescia	Parma
	Mboma 55'; Conceição 67'; Júnior 78'	Report		Stadium: Stadio Ennio Tardini; Attendance: 18,555; Referee: Gennaro Borriello

25 February 2001 20	Parma	5–0	Perugia	Parma
	Torrisi 12'; Milošević 33', 87'; Di Vaio 61'; Amoroso 82' (pen.)	Report		Stadium: Stadio Ennio Tardini; Attendance: 15,238; Referee: Roberto Rosetti

4 March 2001 21	Milan	2–2	Parma	Milan
	Maldini 22'; Guly 50'	Report	Milošević 24'; Amoroso 81'	Stadium: San Siro; Attendance: 45,269; Referee: Alfredo Trentalange

11 March 2001 22	Parma	4–0	Bari	Parma
	Di Vaio 13', 33', 44', 66'	Report		Stadium: Stadio Ennio Tardini; Attendance: 16,873; Referee: Pierpaolo Rossi

18 March 2001 23	Udinese	1–3	Parma	Udine
	Fiore 57' (pen.)	Report	Di Vaio 12'; Amoroso 60' (pen.), 82'	Stadium: Stadio Friuli; Attendance: 18,500; Referee: Gianluca Paparesta

1 April 2001 24	Parma	0–0	Bologna	Parma
		Report		Stadium: Stadio Ennio Tardini; Attendance: 21,179; Referee: Daniele Tombolini

14 April 2001 25	Atalanta	0–1	Parma	Bergamo
		Report	Milošević 28'	Stadium: Stadio Atleti Azzurri d'Italia; Attendance: 17,849; Referee: Gianluca Paparesta

18 April 2001 26	Lazio	1–0	Parma	Rome
	Thuram 12' (o.g.)	Report		Stadium: Stadio Olimpico; Attendance: 46,774; Referee: Domenico Messina

22 April 2001 27	Parma	0–0	Juventus	Parma
		Report		Stadium: Stadio Ennio Tardini; Attendance: 27,148; Referee: Stefano Braschi

28 April 2001 28	Vicenza	0–1	Parma	Vicenza
		Report	Di Vaio 81'	Stadium: Stadio Romeo Menti; Attendance: 14,297; Referee: Fiorenzo Treossi

6 May 2001 29	Parma	4–0	Napoli	Parma
	Micoud 32'; Milošević 51'; Di Vaio 66', 76'	Report		Stadium: Stadio Ennio Tardini; Attendance: 19,739; Referee: Pierluigi Collina

12 May 2001 30	Reggina	2–0	Parma	Reggio Calabria
	Bernini 38', 75'	Report		Stadium: Stadio Oreste Granillo; Attendance: 22,974; Referee: Cosimo Bolognino

17 May 2001 31	Parma	3–1	Internazionale	Parma
	Júnior 14', 89'; Di Vaio 74'	Report	Vieri 90'	Stadium: Stadio Ennio Tardini; Attendance: 17,996; Referee: Alfredo Trentalange

27 May 2001 32	Lecce	1–2	Parma	Lecce
	Viali 58'	Report	Milošević 63'; Mboma 83'	Stadium: Stadio Via del Mare; Attendance: 22,716; Referee: Massimiliano Saccani

10 June 2001 33	Parma	1–2	Hellas Verona	Parma
	Amoroso 69'	Report	Oddo 32' (pen.); Cossato 87'	Stadium: Stadio Ennio Tardini; Attendance: 19,182; Referee: Gianluca Paparesta

17 June 2001 34	Roma	3–1	Parma	Rome
	Totti 19'; Montella 39'; Batistuta 78'	Report	Di Vaio 82'	Stadium: Stadio Olimpico; Attendance: 74,773; Referee: Stefano Braschi

=== Coppa Italia ===
==== Eightfinals ====
17 September 2000 1	Venezia	1–1	Parma	Venice
	Valtolina 43'		Di Vaio 58'	Stadium: Stadio Pier Luigi Penzo

24 September 2000 2	Parma	5–1 (6–2 agg.)	Venezia	Parma
	Micoud 18'; Amoroso 41', 51' (pen.); Milošević 48' (pen.); Di Vaio 89'		De Franceschi 55'	Stadium: Stadio Ennio Tardini

==== Quarter-finals ====
29 November 2000 1	Parma	6–1	Internazionale	Parma
	Serena 18' (o.g.); Micoud 33'; Montaño 34'; Amoroso 39'; Appiah 53'; Sartor 59'		Recoba 43'	Stadium: Stadio Ennio Tardini

14 December 2000 2	Internazionale	0–0 (1–6 agg.)	Parma	Milan
				Stadium: San Siro

==== Semi-finals ====
1 February 2001 1	Udinese	2–1	Parma	Udine
	Margiotta 75', 90'		Amoroso 6'	Stadium: Stadio Friuli

8 February 2001 2	Parma	1–0 (2a–2 agg.)	Udinese	Parma
	Di Vaio 38'			Stadium: Stadio Ennio Tardini

==== Final ====
24 May 2001 1	Parma	0–1	Fiorentina	Parma
21:00			Vanoli 87'	Stadium: Stadio Ennio Tardini; Attendance: 17,685; Referee: Gennaro Borriello

13 June 2001 2	Fiorentina	1–1 (2–1 agg.)	Parma	Florence
21:00	Nuno Gomes 65'		38' Milošević	Stadium: Stadio Artemio Franchi; Attendance: 37,664; Referee: Massimo De Santis

=== UEFA Cup ===
==== First round ====
14 September 2000 First leg	Pobeda (North Macedonia)	0–2	(Italy) Parma	Prilep, Macedonia
20:45 CEST (UTC+02:00)	Nacev (red card) 87'	Report	Conceição 23'; Amoroso (yellow card) 39'; Di Vaio 74'	Stadium: Goce Delčev Stadium; Referee: Leif Sundell (Sweden)

28 September 2000 Second leg	Parma (Italy)	4–0 (6–0 agg.)	(North Macedonia) Pobeda	Parma, Italy
20:45 CEST (UTC+02:00)	Montaño 39'; Bonazzoli 53', 80'; Di Vaio 88'	Report	Gilson (yellow card) 39'; Karanfiloski (yellow card) 86'	Stadium: Stadio Ennio Tardini; Referee: Romans Lajuks (Latvia)

==== Second round ====
26 October 2000 First leg	Parma (Italy)	2–0	(Croatia) Dinamo Zagreb	Parma, Italy
19:00 CEST (UTC+02:00)	Amoroso 61', 79'	Report	Mikić (yellow card) 58'	Stadium: Stadio Ennio Tardini; Attendance: 4,822; Referee: Manuel Mejuto González (Spain)

9 November 2000 Second leg	Dinamo Zagreb (Croatia)	1–0 (1–2 agg.)	(Italy) Parma	Zagreb, Croatia
19:00 CET (UTC+01:00)	Šokota 32'	Report	Júnior (yellow card) 18'; Appiah (yellow card) 51'; F. Cannavaro (yellow card) 53'; Boghossian (yellow card) 87'; Sartor (red card) 89'	Stadium: Stadion Maksimir; Attendance: 4,894; Referee: Dermot Gallagher (England)

==== Third round ====
23 November 2000 First leg	Parma (Italy)	2–2	(Germany) 1860 Munich	Parma, Italy
17:30 CET (UTC+01:00)	Appiah 2'; Micoud 11'; Bolaño (yellow card) 36'; F. Cannavaro (yellow card) 62'	Report	Kurz (yellow card) 69'; Týce 78'; Beierle 89'	Stadium: Stadio Ennio Tardini; Attendance: 14,000; Referee: Alain Sars (France)

5 December 2000 Second leg	1860 Munich (Germany)	0–2 (2–4 agg.)	(Italy) Parma	Munich, Germany
18:00 CET (UTC+01:00)	Mykland (red card) 72'; Agostino (yellow card) 90'	Report	Amoroso 72'; F. Cannavaro (yellow card) 77' (yellow-red card); Conceição 87'	Stadium: Olympiastadion; Attendance: 28,600; Referee: Leslie Irvine (Northern Ireland)

==== Eightfinals ====
15 February 2001 First leg	PSV Eindhoven (Netherlands)	2–1	(Italy) Parma	Eindhoven, Netherlands
20:00 CET (UTC+01:00)	Ooijer 24'; Rommedahl 73'; De Jong (yellow card) 88'	Report	Benarrivo (yellow card) 26'; Fuser (yellow card) 45'; Mboma 66'; P. Cannavaro (yellow card) 69'	Stadium: Philips Stadion; Attendance: 31,000; Referee: Kyros Vassaras (Greece)

22 February 2001 Second leg	Parma (Italy)	3–2 (4–4a agg.)	(Netherlands) PSV Eindhoven	Parma, Italy
19:15 CET (UTC+01:00)	F. Cannavaro (yellow card) 38'; Milošević 63' (pen.), 68'; Montaño 90'	Report	Van Bommel (yellow card) 26'; Rommedahl 31'; Kežman 44'; De Jong (yellow card) 90'	Stadium: Stadio Ennio Tardini; Attendance: 11,883; Referee: Claude Colombo (France)

== Statistics ==
=== Players statistics ===
No.	Pos	Nat	Player	Total		Serie A		Coppa		UEFA	
No.	Pos	Nat	Player	Apps	Goals	Apps	Goals	Apps	Goals	Apps	Goals
77	GK	(Italy) ITA	Buffon	43	-40	34	-31	2	-2	7	-7
5	DF	(Italy) ITA	Torrisi	30	1	21	1	2	0	7	0
17	DF	(Italy) ITA	Cannavaro	46	0	33	0	7	0	6	0
21	DF	(France) FRA	Thuram	45	0	30	0	8	0	7	0
2	DF	(Italy) ITA	Sartor	29	1	17+2	0	7	1	3	0
11	MF	(Portugal) POR	Conceição	36	7	21+4	5	5	0	6	2
8	MF	(France) FRA	Lamouchi	43	3	29	3	7	0	7	0
7	MF	(Italy) ITA	Fuser	37	0	19+7	0	5	0	6	0
18	MF	(France) FRA	Micoud	39	7	23+6	4	6	2	4	1
20	FW	(Italy) ITA	Di Vaio	39	20	19+8	15	7	3	5	2
9	FW	(Federal Republic of Yugoslavia) YUG	Milošević	31	12	18+3	8	5	2	5	2
99	GK	(Italy) ITA	Guardalben	7	-5	0	0	6	-5	1	0
25	MF	(Argentina) ARG	Almeyda	23	0	15+1	0	3	0	4	0
10	FW	(Brazil) BRA	Amoroso	34	14	14+9	7	6	4	5	3
16	DF	(Brazil) BRA	Júnior	29	3	13+4	3	5	0	7	0
33	DF	(Italy) ITA	Falsini	20	0	13	0	4	0	3	0
6	DF	(Argentina) ARG	Sensini	23	0	11+8	0	4	0	0	0
70	FW	(Cameroon) CMR	Mboma	27	6	10+10	5	4	0	3	1
4	MF	(Ghana) GHA	Appiah	26	2	9+6	0	5	1	6	1
3	DF	(Italy) ITA	Benarrivo	19	0	8+5	0	2	0	4	0
14	MF	(France) FRA	Boghossian	23	2	7+5	0	5	1	6	1
29	MF	(Colombia) COL	Bolano	19	0	4+8	0	3	0	4	0
28	DF	(Italy) ITA	P. Cannavaro	9	0	2+2	0	2	0	3	0
26	FW	(Colombia) COL	Montano	11	3	1+4	0	2	1	4	2
	FW	(Italy) ITA	Bonazzoli	2	2	0+1	0	0	0	1	2
1	GK	(Italy) ITA	Micillo	0	0	0	0				
30	FW	(Italy) ITA	Basso	1	0	0	0	1	0	0	0
6	MF	(Italy) ITA	Baggio	3	0	0	0	2	0	1	0
32	DF	(Italy) ITA	Ludi	0	0	0	0				
35	MF	(Italy) ITA	Saccani	0	0	0	0				
36	MF	(Italy) ITA	Cardillo	0	0	0	0				
37	DF	(Italy) ITA	Stirpe	0	0	0	0				
38	DF	(Guinea) GUI	Bangoura	0	0	0	0				

- Source: http://calcio-seriea.net/presenze/2000/1186/

=== Goalscorers ===
Place	Position	Nation	Number	Name	Serie A	Coppa Italia	UEFA Cup	Total
1	FW	(Italy)		Marco Di Vaio	15	3	2	20
2	FW	(Brazil)		Márcio Amoroso	7	4	3	14
3	FW	(Federal Republic of Yugoslavia)		Savo Milošević	8	2	2	12
4	MF	(Portugal)		Sérgio Conceição	5	0	2	7
=	MF	(France)		Johan Micoud	4	2	1	7
6	FW	(Cameroon)		Patrick Mboma	5	0	1	6
7	MF	(France)		Sabri Lamouchi	3	0	0	3
=	MF	(Brazil)		Júnior	3	0	0	3
=	MF	(Colombia)		Johnnier Montaño	0	1	2	3
10	FW	(Italy)		Emiliano Bonazzoli	0	0	2	2
=	MF	(Ghana)		Stephen Appiah	0	1	1	2
12	DF	(Italy)		Stefano Torrisi	1	0	0	1
=				Own goal	0	1	0	1
=	DF	(Italy)		Luigi Sartor	0	1	0	1
				TOTALS	51	15	16	82
