= 1999–2000 Parma AC season =

Parma
1999–2000 season
- Owner: Parmalat
- President: Calisto Tanzi
- Manager: Alberto Malesani
- Stadium: Stadio Ennio Tardini
- Serie A: 5th
- Supercoppa Italiana: Winners
- Coppa Italia: Round of 16
- UEFA Champions League: Third qualifying round
- UEFA Cup: Fourth round
- Top goalscorer: League: Hernán Crespo (22); All: Hernán Crespo (26)
- Average home league attendance: 21,102
Home colours	Away colours	Third colours

Parma Associazione Calcio did not manage to compete for a much-vaunted first Serie A title, which still proved elusive. In the summer following the end of the season, star striker Hernán Crespo ran out of patience, and signed with champions Lazio for a then-world record transfer fee, in a deal that saw Matías Almeyda and Sérgio Conçeicão join Parma. Parma did manage to hold on to Lazio targets Gianluigi Buffon and Lilian Thuram, maintaining hope that the club could break its duck in 2000–01.

== Players ==
=== Squad information ===
Note: Flags indicate national team as defined under FIFA eligibility rules; some limited exceptions apply. Players may hold more than one non-FIFA nationality.

No.	Pos.	Nation	Player
1	GK	ITA	Gianluigi Buffon
2	DF	ITA	Luigi Sartor
3	DF	ITA	Antonio Benarrivo
4	MF	ITA	Roberto Breda
5	DF	ITA	Luigi Apolloni
5	MF	FRA	Ousmane Dabo
6	DF	CIV	Saliou Lassissi
7	MF	ITA	Diego Fuser
8	MF	ITA	Dino Baggio
9	FW	ARG	Hernán Crespo
10	MF	ARG	Ariel Ortega
11	FW	BRA	Márcio Amoroso
12	GK	ITA	Matteo Guardalben
13	MF	CRO	Mario Stanić
14	MF	FRA	Alain Boghossian
15	DF	ITA	Raffaele Longo
16	DF	ITA	Fabio Moro

No.	Pos.	Nation	Player
16	MF	POR	Paulo Sousa
17	DF	ITA	Fabio Cannavaro
18	MF	ITA	Giampiero Maini
19	DF	ITA	Stefano Torrisi
20	FW	ITA	Marco Di Vaio
21	DF	FRA	Lilian Thuram
22	GK	ITA	Davide Micillo
23	DF	ITA	Michele Serena
23	DF	ITA	Davide Zoboli
24	DF	ITA	Paolo Vanoli
25	MF	BEL	Johan Walem
26	FW	COL	Johnnier Montaño
27	MF	ITA	Pietro Strada
28	DF	ITA	Paolo Cannavaro
29	MF	COL	Jorge Bolaño
32	MF	ITA	Manuel Saccani

=== Transfers ===
In
Pos.	Name	from	Type
FW	Marcio Amoroso	Udinese	€28,0 million
FW	Ariel Ortega	Sampdoria	€9.40 million
FW	Marco Di Vaio	Salernitana	
MF	Johan Walem	Udinese	
MF	Paulo Sousa	Internazionale	
MF	Giampiero Maini	AC Milan	
MF	Ousmane Dabo	Internazionale	
MF	Jorge Bolaño	Perugia	
DF	Stefano Torrisi	Atletico Madrid	
DF	Saliou Lassissi	Sampdoria	loan ended
DF	Paolo Cannavaro	Napoli	

Out
Pos.	Name	To	Type
FW	Enrico Chiesa	Fiorentina	€10.7 million
MF	Juan Veron	Lazio	€30.0 million
DF	Nestor Sensini	Lazio	€7.5 million
DF	Roberto Mussi		retired
DF	Luigi Apolloni	Hellas Verona	
MF	Stefano Fiore	Udinese	
MF	Pierluigi Orlandini	AC Milan	
MF	Reynald Pedros	Montpellier	
FW	Faustino Asprilla	Palmeiras	
FW	Abel Balbo	Fiorentina	-

== Competitions ==
=== Overall ===
Competition	Started round	Current position	Final position	First match	Last match
Serie A	Matchday 1	—	5th	29 August 1999	14 May 2000
Coppa Italia	Round of 16	—	Round of 16	1 December 1999	15 December 1999
Champions League	Third qualifying round	—	Third qualifying round	11 August 1999	25 August 1999
UEFA Cup	First round	—	Fourth round	16 September 1999	9 March 2000

Last updated: 14 May 2000

=== Supercoppa Italiana ===
21 August 1999	Milan	1–2	Parma	Milan
	Guly 54'		Crespo 66'; Boghossian 90+2'	Stadium: San Siro; Attendance: 25,001; Referee: Gennaro Borriello

=== Serie A ===
==== League table ====
Pos	Team	Pld	W	D	L	GF	GA	GD	Pts	Qualification or relegation
3	Milan	34	16	13	5	65	40	+25	61	Qualification to Champions League third qualifying round
4	Internazionale (Note: Internazionale entered the 2000–01 UEFA Champions League after winning the UEFA Champions League qualification match against Parma.)	34	17	7	10	58	36	+22	58	Qualification to Champions League third qualifying round
5	Parma	34	16	10	8	52	37	+15	58	Qualification to UEFA Cup first round
6	Roma	34	14	12	8	57	34	+23	54	Qualification to UEFA Cup first round
7	Fiorentina (Note: Fiorentina gained entry to the 2000–01 UEFA Cup as both 1999–2000 Coppa Italia finalists had qualified for the 2000–01 UEFA Champions League.)	34	13	12	9	48	38	+10	51	Qualification to UEFA Cup first round

Source: Serie A, RSSSF.com, Soccerway
Rules for classification: 1) Points; 2) Head-to-head points; 3) Head-to-head goal difference; 4) Goal difference; 5) Goals scored; 6) Draw. (Note: Head-to-head record is used only after all the matches between the teams in question have been played).

==== Results summary ====
Overall								Home						Away					
Pld	W	D	L	GF	GA	GD	Pts	W	D	L	GF	GA	GD	W	D	L	GF	GA	GD
34	16	10	8	52	37	+15	58	10	4	3	31	16	+15	6	6	5	21	21	0

Last updated: 14 May 2000.
Source: Competitive matches

==== Results by round ====
Round	1	2	3	4	5	6	7	8	9	10	11	12	13	14	15	16	17	18	19	20	21	22	23	24	25	26	27	28	29	30	31	32	33	34	35
Ground	A	H	A	H	H	A	A	H	A	H	A	H	A	H	A	H	A	H	A	H	A	A	H	H	A	H	A	H	A	H	A	H	A	H	N
Result	D	D	L	L	W	W	D	W	W	W	L	W	W	W	W	D	D	L	L	D	D	L	L	W	W	W	W	W	D	W	D	D	L	W	L
Position	4	9	12	14	11	6	7	7	5	4	6	5	4	3	3	3	3	4	6	6	6	6	6	6	6	6	5	3	3	3	3	4	4	4	5

Source: Competitive matches
A = Away; H = Home; W = Win; D = Draw; L = Loss; = Leader, UEFA Champions League Groups stage; = UEFA Champions League Groups stage; = UEFA Champions League Qualifying round; = 2000–01 UEFA Cup; = 2000 UEFA Intertoto Cup; = 2000–01 Serie B

==== Matches ====
29 August 1999 1	Perugia	1–1	Parma	Perugia
	Olive 46'	Report	Stanić 77'	Stadium: Stadio Renato Curi; Referee: Daniele Tombolini

12 September 1999 2	Parma	1–1	Bologna	Parma
	Ingesson 83' (o.g.)	Report	Signori 47'	Stadium: Stadio Ennio Tardini; Referee: Pasquale Rodomonti

19 September 1999 3	Internazionale	5–1	Parma	Milan
	Zamorano 8', 63'; Vieri 17'; Moriero 39'; Thuram 72' (o.g.)	Report	Crespo 14'	Stadium: San Siro; Referee: Massimo De Santis

26 September 1999 4	Parma	1–2	Lazio	Parma
	Boghossian 62'	Report	Salas 30'; Almeyda 69'	Stadium: Stadio Ennio Tardini; Referee: Pierluigi Collina

3 October 1999 5	Parma	3–0	Hellas Verona	Parma
	Amoroso 4'; Ortega 7'; Crespo 35'	Report		Stadium: Stadio Ennio Tardini; Referee: Diego Preschern

16 October 1999 6	Fiorentina	0–2	Parma	Florence
		Report	Di Vaio 83'; Boghossian 90+6'	Stadium: Stadio Artemio Franchi; Referee: Daniele Tombolini

24 October 1999 7	Reggina	2–2	Parma	Reggio Calabria
	Baronio 53'; Pirlo 59'	Report	Crespo 1', 54'	Stadium: Stadio Oreste Granillo; Referee: Domenico Messina

31 October 1999 8	Parma	2–1	Bari	Parma
	F. Cannavaro 5'; Innocenti 28' (o.g.)	Report	Innocenti 80'	Stadium: Stadio Ennio Tardini; Referee: Stefano Farina

7 November 1999 9	Piacenza	1–2	Parma	Piacenza
	Di Napoli 45+1' (pen.)	Report	Crespo 22'; Boghossian 32'	Stadium: Stadio Leonardo Garilli; Referee: Cosimo Bolognino

21 November 1999 10	Parma	3–1	Cagliari	Parma
	Crespo 58' (pen.); Di Vaio 59', 84'	Report	M'Boma 56'	Stadium: Stadio Ennio Tardini; Referee: Domenico Messina

28 November 1999 11	Milan	2–1	Parma	Milan
	Boban 8', 51'	Report	Crespo 46'	Stadium: San Siro; Referee: Pierluigi Collina

5 December 1999 12	Parma	4–1	Torino	Parma
	Crespo 4', 59'; Ortega 45+1'; André Cruz 76' (o.g.)	Report	André Cruz 90'	Stadium: Stadio Ennio Tardini; Referee: Massimo De Santis

12 December 1999 13	Venezia	0–2	Parma	Venice
		Report	F. Cannavaro 11'; Crespo 33'	Stadium: Stadio Pier Luigi Penzo; Referee: Pasquale Rodomonti

19 December 1999 14	Parma	2–0	Roma	Parma
	Crespo 2'; Torrisi 24'	Report		Stadium: Stadio Ennio Tardini; Referee: Fiorenzo Treossi

6 January 2000 15	Udinese	0–1	Parma	Udine
		Report	Di Vaio 54'	Stadium: Stadio Friuli; Referee: Alfredo Trentalange

9 January 2000 16	Parma	1–1	Juventus	Parma
	Crespo 90+2'	Report	Del Piero 69' (pen.)	Stadium: Stadio Ennio Tardini; Referee: Stefano Farina

16 January 2000 17	Lecce	0–0	Parma	Lecce
		Report		Stadium: Stadio Via del Mare; Referee: Daniele Tombolini

23 January 2000 18	Parma	1–2	Perugia	Parma
	Ortega 88'	Report	Calori 26'; Olive 35'	Stadium: Stadio Ennio Tardini; Referee: Alfredo Trentalange

30 January 2000 19	Bologna	1–0	Parma	Bologna
	Bia 47'	Report		Stadium: Stadio Renato Dall'Ara; Referee: Massimo De Santis

6 February 2000 20	Parma	1–1	Internazionale	Parma
	Crespo 90+4' (pen.)	Report	Vieri 61'	Stadium: Stadio Ennio Tardini; Referee: Pierluigi Collina

13 February 2000 21	Lazio	0–0	Parma	Rome
		Report		Stadium: Stadio Olimpico; Referee: Livio Bazzoli

20 February 2000 22	Hellas Verona	4–3	Parma	Verona
	Brocchi 2'; Morfeo 48'; Colucci 53'; Melis 81'	Report	Stanić 6'; Fuser 21'; Crespo 23'	Stadium: Stadio Marc'Antonio Bentegodi; Referee: Gianluca Paparesta

26 February 2000 23	Parma	0–4	Fiorentina	Parma
		Report	Balbo 22'; Rui Costa 66', 75'; Mijatović 85'	Stadium: Stadio Ennio Tardini; Referee: Stefano Farina

5 March 2000 24	Parma	3–0	Reggina	Parma
	Fuser 3'; Crespo 35', 45' (pen.)	Report		Stadium: Stadio Ennio Tardini; Referee: Gianluca Paparesta

12 March 2000 25	Bari	0–1	Parma	Bari
		Report	Amoroso 45+1'	Stadium: Stadio San Nicola; Referee: Alfredo Trentalange

19 March 2000 26	Parma	1–0	Piacenza	Parma
	Crespo 64' (pen.)	Report		Stadium: Stadio Ennio Tardini; Referee: Pasquale Rodomonti

25 March 2000 27	Cagliari	2–3	Parma	Cagliari
	Berretta 52'; De Patre 63'	Report	Fuser 3'; Amoroso 4'; Stanić 81'	Stadium: Stadio Sant'Elia; Referee: Fiorenzo Treossi

2 April 2000 28	Parma	1–0	Milan	Parma
	Crespo 69'	Report		Stadium: Stadio Ennio Tardini; Referee: Pierluigi Collina

8 April 2000 29	Torino	2–2	Parma	Turin
	Sommese 19'; Silenzi 75'	Report	Crespo 51'; Amoroso 74'	Stadium: Stadio delle Alpi; Referee: Alfredo Trentalange

16 April 2000 30	Parma	3–1	Venezia	Parma
	Crespo 32', 89'; Di Vaio 90+1'	Report	Budan 19'	Stadium: Stadio Ennio Tardini; Referee: Alfredo Trentalange

22 April 2000 31	Roma	0–0	Parma	Rome
		Report		Stadium: Stadio Olimpico; Referee: Roberto Rosetti

30 April 2000 32	Parma	0–0	Udinese	Parma
		Report		Stadium: Stadio Ennio Tardini; Referee: Gennaro Borriello

7 May 2000 33	Juventus	1–0	Parma	Turin
	Del Piero 60'	Report		Stadium: Stadio delle Alpi; Referee: Massimo De Santis

14 May 2000 34	Parma	4–1	Lecce	Parma
	Di Vaio 4'; Stanić 53', 85'; Crespo 55' (pen.)	Report	Lucarelli 70'	Stadium: Stadio Ennio Tardini; Referee: Pasquale Rodomonti

==== UEFA Champions League qualification ====
23 May 2000	Inter	3–1	Parma	Verona
20:30 CEST	Baggio 35', 73'; Zamorano 89'	Report	Stanić 69'	Stadium: Stadio Marcantonio Bentegodi; Attendance: 25,000; Referee: Graziano Cesari

Internazionale qualified to 2000–01 UEFA Champions League's third qualifying round, while Parma qualified to the 2000–01 UEFA Cup first round.

=== Coppa Italia ===
==== Round of 16 ====
1 December 1999 First leg	Cagliari	1–0	Parma	Cagliari
	M'Boma 75' (pen.)			Stadium: Stadio Sant'Elia

15 December 1999 Second leg	Parma	2–2 (2–3 agg.)	Cagliari	Parma
	Benarrivo 11'; Walem 64'		M'Boma 33'; O'Neill 42'	Stadium: Stadio Ennio Tardini

=== UEFA Champions League ===
==== Third qualifying round ====
11 August 1999 First leg	Rangers (Scotland)	2–0	(Italy) Parma	Glasgow, Scotland
21:05 CEST (UTC+02:00)	Vidmar 34'; Amoruso (yellow card) 35'; Albertz (yellow card) 64'; Porrini (yellow card) 73'; Reyna 75'	Report	F. Cannavaro (yellow card) 27' (yellow-red card); Vanoli (yellow card) 62'	Stadium: Ibrox Stadium; Attendance: 49,263; Referee: José María García-Aranda (Spain)

25 August 1999 Second leg	Parma (Italy)	1–0 (1–2 agg.)	(Scotland) Rangers	Parma, Italy
21:00 CEST (UTC+02:00)	Lassissi (yellow card) 65'; Walem 68'	Report	Wallace (yellow card) 14'; Amoruso (yellow card) 34'	Stadium: Stadio Ennio Tardini; Attendance: 24,087; Referee: Karl-Erik Nilsson (Sweden)

=== UEFA Cup ===
==== First round ====
16 September 1999 First leg	Parma (Italy)	3–2	(Ukraine) Kryvbas Kryvyi Rih	Parma, Italy
19:15 CEST (UTC+02:00)	Di Vaio 13', 19'; Serena (yellow card) 30'; D. Baggio 66'; Benarrivo (yellow card) 87'	Report	Palyanytsya 5'; Granovskyy (yellow card) 13'; Yskov (yellow card) 69'; Monaryov 71'	Stadium: Stadio Ennio Tardini; Attendance: 3,887; Referee: Stuart Dougal (Scotland)

30 September 1999 Second leg	Kryvbas Kryvyi Rih (Ukraine)	0–3 (2–6 agg.)	(Italy) Parma	Kryvyi Rih, Ukraine
18:00 CEST (UTC+02:00)	Ponomarenko (yellow card) 9'; Doroshenko (red card) 21'; Rymshyn (yellow card) 86'	Report	Crespo (yellow card) 25', (goal) 41'; Boghossian 37'; Di Vaio 67'; Montaño (yellow card) 90'	Stadium: Metalurh Stadium; Attendance: 28,000; Referee: Konrad Plautz (Austria)

==== Second round ====
21 October 1999 First leg	Parma (Italy)	1–0	(Sweden) Helsingborg	Parma, Italy
21:00 CEST (UTC+02:00)	F. Cannavaro 43'	Report	Jonson (yellow card) 65'; Jansson (yellow card) 85'	Stadium: Stadio Ennio Tardini; Attendance: 3,530; Referee: Costas Kapitanis (Cyprus)

4 November 1999 Second leg	Helsingborg (Sweden)	1–3 (1–4 agg.)	(Italy) Parma	Helsingborg, Sweden
19:00 CET (UTC+01:00)	Stavrum 85'	Report	Di Vaio 10', 42', 43'	Stadium: Olympia; Attendance: 11,973; Referee: Vasyl Melnychuk (Ukraine)

==== Third round ====
25 November 1999 First leg	Parma (Italy)	2–1	(Austria) Sturm Graz	Parma, Italy
17:00 CET (UTC+01:00)	Di Vaio 16'; Montaño (yellow card) 41'; Torrisi 62'; Sartor (yellow card) 66'	Report	Schopp 21'; Prilasnig (yellow card) 38'; Mählich (yellow card) 39'; Neukirchner (yellow card) 43'; Martens (red card) 86'	Stadium: Stadio Ennio Tardini; Attendance: 8,000; Referee: Dermot Gallagher (Republic of Ireland)

9 December 1999 Second leg	Sturm Graz (Austria)	3–3 (a.e.t.) (4–5 agg.)	(Italy) Parma	Graz, Austria
18:00 CET (UTC+01:00)	Mählich (yellow card) 19'; Strafner (yellow card) 27'; Feldhofer (yellow card) 49'; Reinmayr 67', 94'; Vastić 86', (yellow card) 98'	Report	Stanić 5', 109'; D. Baggio (yellow card) 13'; Breda (yellow card) 74'; F. Cannavaro (yellow card) 77'; Thuram (yellow card) 79'; Crespo 116'; Micillo (yellow card) 117'	Stadium: Arnold Schwarzenegger-Stadium; Attendance: 13,433; Referee: Miroslav Radoman (FR Yugoslavia)

==== Fourth round ====
29 February 2000 First leg	Parma (Italy)	1–0	(Germany) Werder Bremen	Parma, Italy
18:00 CET (UTC+01:00)	Crespo 5'; Vanoli (yellow card) 28'; Sousa (yellow card) 36'; Thuram (yellow card) 39'; Fuser (yellow card) 51'	Report	Baumann (yellow card) 58'	Stadium: Stadio Ennio Tardini; Attendance: 8,938; Referee: Michel Piraux (Belgium)

9 March 2000 Second leg	Werder Bremen (Germany)	3–1 (3–2 agg.)	(Italy) Parma	Bremen, Germany
20:45 CET (UTC+01:00)	Dabrowski 30'; Bode 45'; Aílton 65'; Rost (yellow card) 82'; Wiedener (yellow card) 85'	Report	Stanić 32'; Sousa (yellow card) 49'; Sartor (yellow card) 73'	Stadium: Weserstadion; Attendance: 30,050; Referee: Ryszard Wójcik (Poland)

== Statistics ==
=== Players statistics ===
No.	Pos	Nat	Player	Total		Serie A		UEFA Cup		UEFA Champions League	
No.	Pos	Nat	Player	Apps	Goals	Apps	Goals	Apps	Goals	Apps	Goals
1	GK	(Italy) ITA	Buffon	41	-45	32	-36	7	-7	2	-2
21	DF	(France) FRA	Thuram	43	0	33	0	8	0	2	0
3	DF	(Italy) ITA	Benarrivo	22	0	16+2	0	1+3	0		
17	DF	(Italy) ITA	Cannavaro	40	3	31	2	7+1	1	1	0
2	DF	(Italy) ITA	Sartor	23	0	15+1	0	4+2	0	1	0
24	DF	(Italy) ITA	Vanoli	36	0	24+5	0	5	0	2	0
7	MF	(Italy) ITA	Fuser	33	3	28	3	3	0	1+1	0
8	MF	(Italy) ITA	Baggio	33	1	23+1	0	7	1	2	0
5	MF	(France) FRA	Dabo	17	0	15+1	0	0+1	0		
9	FW	(Argentina) ARG	Crespo	39	25	34	22	3+1	3	1	0
11	FW	(Brazil) BRA	Amoroso	17	4	14+2	4	0+1	0		
12	GK	(Italy) ITA	Guardalben	2	-2	1	-1	1	-1		
10	MF	(Argentina) ARG	Ortega	25	3	16+2	3	4+1	0	2	0
20	FW	(Italy) ITA	Di Vaio	33	13	12+11	6	6+2	7	2	0
13	MF	(Croatia) CRO	Stanic	32	8	11+12	5	7	3	0+2	0
6	DF	(Ivory Coast) CIV	Lassissi	16	0	11+3	0	1	0	1	0
14	MF	(France) FRA	Boghossian	17	4	11	3	4	1	2	0
23	DF	(Italy) ITA	Serena	22	0	10+5	0	5	0	1+1	0
25	MF	(Belgium) BEL	Walem	31	1	8+16	0	4+1	0	1+1	1
29	MF	(Colombia) COL	Bolaño	10	0	7+3	0				
16	MF	(Portugal) POR	Paulo Sousa	10	0	7+1	0	2	0		
4	MF	(Italy) ITA	Breda	23	0	5+11	0	2+5	0		
19	DF	(Italy) ITA	Torrisi	11	2	5	1	4	1	1+1	0
15	DF	(Italy) ITA	Longo	11	0	4+5	0	1+1	0		
22	GK	(Italy) ITA	Micillo	2	-2	1	0	0+1	-2		
18	MF	(Italy) ITA	Maini	8	0	0+6	0	1+1	0		
	MF	(Italy) ITA	Ghidini	0	0	0	0				
	GK	(Italy) ITA	Filosa	0	0	0	0				
23	DF	(Italy) ITA	Zoboli	0	0	0	0				
26	FW	(Colombia) COL	Montaño	3	0	0	0	1+2	0		
	MF	(Italy) ITA	Fabbi	0	0	0	0				
28	DF	(Italy) ITA	Cannavaro P	0	0	0	0				
32	MF	(Italy) ITA	Saccani	0	0	0	0				
	MF	(Italy) ITA	Basso	0	0	0	0				
	GK	(Italy) ITA	De Angelis	0	0	0	0				

- Source: http://calcio-seriea.net/presenze/1999/1173/

=== Goalscorers ===
Rank	No.	Pos	Nat	Name	Serie A	Supercoppa	Coppa Italia	UEFA CL	UEFA Cup	Total
1	9	FW	(Argentina)	Hernán Crespo	22	1	0	0	3	26
2	20	FW	(Italy)	Marco Di Vaio	6	0	0	0	7	13
3	13	MF	(Croatia)	Mario Stanić	5	0	0	0	3	8
4	14	MF	(France)	Alain Boghossian	3	1	0	0	1	5
5	11	FW	(Brazil)	Márcio Amoroso	4	0	0	0	0	4
6	7	MF	(Italy)	Diego Fuser	3	0	0	0	0	3
6	10	MF	(Argentina)	Ariel Ortega	3	0	0	0	0	3
6	17	DF	(Italy)	Fabio Cannavaro	2	0	0	0	1	3
9	19	DF	(Italy)	Stefano Torrisi	1	0	0	0	1	2
9	25	MF	(Belgium)	Johan Walem	0	0	1	1	0	2
11	3	DF	(Italy)	Antonio Benarrivo	0	0	1	0	0	1
11	8	MF	(Italy)	Dino Baggio	0	0	0	0	1	1
Own goal					3	0	0	0	0	3
Totals					52	2	2	1	17	74

Last updated: 14 May 2000
