= 2001–02 Parma AC season =

Parma
2001–02 season
- Owner: Parmalat
- President: Calisto Tanzi
- Manager: Renzo Ulivieri (Until 29 October 2001); Pietro Carmignani (Until 5 November 2001); Daniel Passarella (Until 17 December 2001); Pietro Carmignani
- Stadium: Stadio Ennio Tardini
- Serie A: 10th
- Coppa Italia: Winners
- UEFA Champions League: Third qualifying round
- UEFA Cup: Fourth round
- Top goalscorer: League: Marco Di Vaio (20); All: Marco Di Vaio (23)
- Average home league attendance: 17,956
Home colours	Away colours	Third colours

Parma Associazione Calcio suffered a major setback in the 2001–02 Serie A season after selling two of their key players in the summer of 2001, as goalkeeper and former youth-team product Gianluigi Buffon and French international Lilian Thuram both departed for Juventus. Parma had a disappointing league campaign, finishing in 10th place, but on the other hand they managed to win the Coppa Italia, beating Juventus 1–0 at home, before losing 2–1 away and winning on the away goals rule.

== Players ==
=== Squad information ===
Note: Flags indicate national team as defined under FIFA eligibility rules; some limited exceptions apply. Players may hold more than one non-FIFA nationality.

No.	Pos.	Nation	Player
1	GK	FRA	Sébastien Frey
3	DF	ITA	Antonio Benarrivo
4	MF	GHA	Stephen Appiah
6	DF	ARG	Roberto Sensini
7	DF	ITA	Luigi Sartor
8	MF	FRA	Sabri Lamouchi
10	MF	JPN	Hidetoshi Nakata
11	FW	TUR	Hakan Şükür
13	MF	ITA	Giampiero Maini
14	MF	FRA	Alain Boghossian
15	DF	BLR	Sergei Gurenko
16	MF	BRA	Júnior
17	MF	ITA	Fabio Cannavaro
18	MF	FRA	Johan Micoud

No.	Pos.	Nation	Player
19	FW	ITA	Gaetano Grieco
20	FW	ITA	Marco Di Vaio
21	DF	ITA	Matteo Ferrari
22	FW	ITA	Emiliano Bonazzoli
23	DF	ITA	Aimo Diana
25	MF	ARG	Matías Almeyda
26	MF	ITA	Philip Porcari
27	FW	ITA	Luca Ferretti
29	MF	COL	Jorge Bolaño
30	GK	BRA	Cláudio Taffarel
32	MF	ITA	Marco Marchionni
34	DF	ITA	Roberto Vitiello
74	DF	FRA	Martin Djetou
83	GK	ITA	Alfonso De Lucia

=== Transfers ===
In
Pos.	Name	from	Type
GK	Sébastien Frey	Internazionale	
MF	Hidetoshi Nakata	Roma	
DF	Martin Djetou	Monaco	
FW	Hakan Sukur	Internazionale	
FW	Gaetano Grieco	Genoa	
DF	Matteo Ferrari	Internazionale	
DF	Aimo Diana	Brescia	
GK	Claudio Taffarel	Galatasaray	

Out
Pos.	Name	To	Type
GK	Gianluigi Buffon	Juventus	
DF	Lilian Thuram	Juventus	
MF	Sergio Conceicao	Internazionale	
FW	Marcio Amoroso	Borussia Dortmund	
MF	Diego Fuser	Roma	
DF	Stefano Torrisi	Marseille	
DF	Paolo Cannavaro	Hellas Verona	loan

==== Left club during season ====
Note: Flags indicate national team as defined under FIFA eligibility rules; some limited exceptions apply. Players may hold more than one non-FIFA nationality.

No.	Pos.	Nation	Player
2	DF	ITA	Gianluca Falsini (to Atalanta)
5	DF	ITA	Stefano Torrisi (to Marseille)
9	FW	YUG	Savo Milošević (on loan to Zaragoza)
12	GK	ITA	Gabriel Giaroli (released)

No.	Pos.	Nation	Player
24	DF	ITA	Amedeo Mangone (to Brescia)
26	MF	ITA	Jonathan Bachini (on loan to Brescia)
70	FW	CMR	Patrick M'Boma (on loan to Sunderland)

== Competitions ==
=== Serie A ===
==== League table ====
Pos	Team	Pld	W	D	L	GF	GA	GD	Pts	Qualification or relegation
8	Perugia	34	13	7	14	38	46	−8	46	Qualification to Intertoto Cup third round
9	Atalanta	34	12	9	13	41	50	−9	45	
10	Parma (Note: Parma gained entry to the 2002–03 UEFA Cup as the 2001–02 Coppa Italia champions.)	34	12	8	14	43	47	−4	44	Qualification to UEFA Cup first round
11	Torino (Note: Torino gained entry to the 2002 UEFA Intertoto Cup after Atalanta declined to take part.)	34	10	13	11	37	39	−2	43	Qualification to Intertoto Cup second round
12	Piacenza	34	11	9	14	49	43	+6	42	

Source: 2001–02 Serie A, Soccerway
Rules for classification: 1) Points; 2) Head-to-head points; 3) Head-to-head goal difference; 4) Goal difference; 5) Goals scored; 6) Draw. (Note: Head-to-head record is used only after all the matches between the teams in question have been played).

==== Results summary ====
Overall								Home						Away					
Pld	W	D	L	GF	GA	GD	Pts	W	D	L	GF	GA	GD	W	D	L	GF	GA	GD
34	12	8	14	43	47	−4	44	8	6	3	22	15	+7	4	2	11	21	32	−11

Last updated: 5 May 2002.
Source: Competitive matches

==== Results by round ====
Round	1	2	3	4	5	6	7	8	9	10	11	12	13	14	15	16	17	18	19	20	21	22	23	24	25	26	27	28	29	30	31	32	33	34	35
Ground	A	H	A	H	A	A	H	A	H	H	A	H	A	H	A	H	A	H	A	H	A	H	H	A	P	H	A	A	H	A	H	A	H	A	H
Result	D	D	L	W	D	L	D	L	D	W	L	L	L	L	L	W	W	D	L	W	W	W	L	W	-	D	L	L	W	L	W	L	D	W	W
Position	5	9	12	7	9	10	13	13	10	12	14	15	16	17	17	16	14	15	16	15	13	11	12	10	11	13	12	13	12	12	10	13	13	11	10

Source: Competitive matches
A = Away; H = Home; W = Win; D = Draw; L = Loss; P = Postponed; = Leader, 2002–03 UEFA Champions League Group stage; = 2002–03 UEFA Champions League Group stage; = 2002–03 UEFA Champions League second qualifying round; = 2002–03 UEFA Cup first round; = 2002 UEFA Intertoto Cup; = 2002–03 Serie B; c = 2002–03 UEFA Cup first round as Coppa Italia finalists.

==== Matches ====
26 August 2001 1	Lecce	1–1	Parma	Lecce
	Chevantón 2'	Report	Di Vaio 71'	Stadium: Stadio Via del Mare; Attendance: 22,157; Referee: Alfredo Trentalange

2 September 2001 2	Parma	2–2	Internazionale	Parma
	Milošević 28'; Bonazzoli 85'	Report	Materazzi 10'; Ventola 29'	Stadium: Stadio Ennio Tardini; Attendance: 27,498; Referee: Massimo De Santis

16 September 2001 3	Bologna	1–0	Parma	Bologna
	Cruz 58'	Report		Stadium: Stadio Renato Dall'Ara; Attendance: 17,945; Referee: Daniele Tombolini

23 September 2001 4	Parma	1–0	Brescia	Parma
	Nakata 87'	Report		Stadium: Stadio Ennio Tardini; Attendance: 16,369; Referee: Alfredo Trentalange

29 September 2001 5	Lazio	0–0	Parma	Rome
		Report		Stadium: Stadio Olimpico; Attendance: 37,327; Referee: Stefano Braschi

7 October 2001 7	Parma	2–2	Piacenza	Parma
	Di Vaio 40'; Djetou 80'	Report	Hübner 50', 73'	Stadium: Stadio Ennio Tardini; Attendance: 15,515; Referee: Roberto Rosetti

21 October 2001 8	Chievo	1–0	Parma	Verona
	Corradi 24'	Report		Stadium: Stadio Marc'Antonio Bentegodi; Attendance: 12,854; Referee: Stefano Braschi

28 October 2001 9	Parma	2–2	Hellas Verona	Parma
	Di Vaio 57'; Bonazzoli 89'	Report	Frick 20'; Mutu 44'	Stadium: Stadio Ennio Tardini; Attendance: 16,313; Referee: Massimiliano Saccani

4 November 2001 10	Parma	2–1	Perugia	Parma
	Di Vaio 19', 90+2'	Report	Vryzas 68'	Stadium: Stadio Ennio Tardini; Attendance: 15,093; Referee: Cosimo Bolognino

11 November 2001 11	Juventus	3–1	Parma	Turin
	Trezeguet 10', 90+5'; Del Piero 75'	Report	Lamouchi 23'	Stadium: Stadio delle Alpi; Attendance: 38,355; Referee: Gianluca Paparesta

24 November 2001 12	Parma	0–1	Milan	Parma
		Report	Inzaghi 30'	Stadium: Stadio Ennio Tardini; Attendance: 22,527; Referee: Gennaro Borriello

2 December 2001 13	Udinese	3–2	Parma	Udine
	Muzzi 24', 33' (pen.); Jørgensen 53'	Report	Di Vaio 1', 3'	Stadium: Stadio Friuli; Attendance: 13,235; Referee: Paolo Dondarini

8 December 2001 14	Parma	1–2	Roma	Parma
	Di Vaio 31'	Report	Assunção 49'; Fuser 77'	Stadium: Stadio Ennio Tardini; Attendance: 21,667; Referee: Pierluigi Collina

16 December 2001 15	Atalanta	4–1	Parma	Bergamo
	Berretta 23'; Sala 43'; Doni 58'; Comandini 66'	Report	Micoud 68'	Stadium: Stadio Atleti Azzurri d'Italia; Attendance: 13,770; Referee: Graziano Cesari

19 December 2001 6	Torino	1–0	Parma	Turin
	Ferrante 45+1'	Report		Stadium: Stadio Olimpico di Torino; Attendance: 12,616; Referee: Massimiliano Saccani

23 December 2001 16	Parma	2–0	Fiorentina	Parma
	Bonazzoli 71'; Di Vaio 81'	Report		Stadium: Stadio Ennio Tardini; Attendance: 16,789; Referee: Alfredo Trentalange

6 January 2002 17	Venezia	3–4	Parma	Venice
	Bettarini 5'; Maniero 45' (pen.), 89'	Report	Di Vaio 19', 24', 90+1'; Bonazzoli 38'	Stadium: Stadio Pier Luigi Penzo; Attendance: 6,856; Referee: Massimo De Santis

13 January 2002 18	Parma	1–1	Lecce	Parma
	Djetou 56'	Report	Vugrinec 89'	Stadium: Stadio Ennio Tardini; Attendance: 15,956; Referee: Danilo Nucini

20 January 2002 19	Internazionale	2–0	Parma	Milan
	Sensini 3' (o.g.); Vieri 84'	Report		Stadium: San Siro; Attendance: 53,743; Referee: Roberto Rosetti

26 January 2002 20	Parma	2–1	Bologna	Parma
	Cannavaro 7'; Şükür 16'	Report	Pecchia 53'	Stadium: Stadio Ennio Tardini; Attendance: 15,387; Referee: Gennaro Borriello

3 February 2002 21	Brescia	1–4	Parma	Brescia
	Toni 68'	Report	Micoud 5'; Şükür 8'; Di Vaio 20', 90+4'	Stadium: Stadio Mario Rigamonti; Attendance: 12,330; Referee: Gianluca Paparesta

10 February 2002 22	Parma	1–0	Lazio	Parma
	Di Vaio 68'	Report		Stadium: Stadio Ennio Tardini; Attendance: 17,256; Referee: Stefano Farina

17 February 2002 23	Parma	0–1	Torino	Parma
		Report	Comotto 89'	Stadium: Stadio Ennio Tardini; Attendance: 16,241; Referee: Massimo De Santis

24 February 2002 24	Piacenza	2–3	Parma	Piacenza
	Hübner 80', 90+4' (pen.)	Report	Di Vaio 30'; Micoud 43'; Boghossian 73'	Stadium: Stadio Leonardo Garilli; Attendance: 7,994; Referee: Pierluigi Collina

10 March 2002 26	Hellas Verona	1–0	Parma	Verona
	Mutu 84' (pen.)	Report		Stadium: Stadio Marc'Antonio Bentegodi; Attendance: 15,602; Referee: Marco Gabriele

13 March 2002 25	Parma	0–0	Chievo	Parma
		Report		Stadium: Stadio Ennio Tardini; Attendance: 14,704; Referee: Paolo Bertini

17 March 2002 27	Perugia	2–1	Parma	Perugia
	Vryzas 8'; Bazzani 29'	Report	Bonazzoli 66'	Stadium: Stadio Renato Curi; Attendance: 8,189; Referee: Matteo Trefoloni

23 March 2002 28	Parma	1–0	Juventus	Parma
	Lamouchi 88'	Report		Stadium: Stadio Ennio Tardini; Attendance: 25,297; Referee: Paolo Bertini

30 March 2002 29	Milan	3–1	Parma	Milan
	Inzaghi 53', 90+3'; Pirlo 78'	Report	Di Vaio 14'	Stadium: San Siro; Attendance: 54,222; Referee: Stefano Farina

7 April 2002 30	Parma	2–0	Udinese	Parma
	Diana 24'; Şükür 76'	Report		Stadium: Stadio Ennio Tardini; Attendance: 16,624; Referee: Alfredo Trentalange

14 April 2002 31	Roma	3–1	Parma	Rome
	Delvecchio 7'; Cassano 41'; Samuel 46'	Report	Lamouchi 43'	Stadium: Stadio Olimpico; Attendance: 61,870; Referee: Gianluca Paparesta

21 April 2002 32	Parma	1–1	Atalanta	Parma
	Micoud 90+2'	Report	Comandini 39' (pen.)	Stadium: Stadio Ennio Tardini; Attendance: 16,696; Referee: Stefano Braschi

28 April 2002 33	Fiorentina	1–2	Parma	Florence
	Adriano 4'	Report	Di Vaio 82', 90'	Stadium: Stadio Artemio Franchi; Attendance: 13,054; Referee: Domenico Messina

5 May 2002 34	Parma	2–1	Venezia	Parma
	Di Vaio 44' (pen.); Micoud 80'	Report	Maniero 7'	Stadium: Stadio Ennio Tardini; Attendance: 15,318; Referee: Paolo Bertini

=== Coppa Italia ===
==== Round of 16 ====
17 November 2001 First leg	Messina	0–2	Parma	Messina
			Di Vaio 13'; Micoud 37'	Stadium: Stadio San Filippo

21 November 2001 Second leg	Parma	1–2 (3–2 agg.)	Messina	Parma
	Milošević 54' (pen.)		Godeas 13'; Iannuzzi 90'	Stadium: Stadio Ennio Tardini

==== Quarter-finals ====
4 December 2001 First leg	Udinese	1–1	Parma	Udine
	Di Michele 73'		Marchionni 38'	Stadium: Stadio Friuli

9 January 2002 Second leg	Parma	0–0 (1a–1 agg.)	Udinese	Parma
				Stadium: Stadio Ennio Tardini

==== Semi-finals ====
31 January 2002 First leg	Parma	2–0	Brescia	Parma
	Nakata 55'; Marchionni 62'			Stadium: Stadio Ennio Tardini

7 February 2002 Second leg	Brescia	2–1 (2–3 agg.)	Parma	Brescia
	Giunti 68' (pen.); Salgado 72'		Bonazzoli 49'	Stadium: Stadio Mario Rigamonti

==== Final ====
2 May 2002 First leg	Juventus	2–1	Parma	Turin
21:00 CET	Amoruso 4' (pen.); Zalayeta 56'		Nakata 90'	Stadium: Stadio delle Alpi

16 May 2002 Second leg	Parma	1–0 (2a–2 agg.)	Juventus	Parma
21:00 CET	Júnior 4'			Stadium: Stadio Ennio Tardini

=== UEFA Champions League ===
==== Third qualifying round ====
15 August 2001 First leg	Parma (Italy)	0–2	(France) Lille	Parma, Italy
21:00 CEST (UTC+02:00)	Sensini (yellow card) 58'; Nakata (yellow card) 76'	Report	Bassir 47', (yellow card) 54'; Pichot (yellow card) 49'; Ecker 80'	Stadium: Stadio Ennio Tardini; Attendance: 14,974; Referee: Juan Antonio Fernández Marín (Spain)

29 August 2001 Second leg	Lille (France)	0–1 (2–1 agg.)	(Italy) Parma	Lille, France
20:45 CEST (UTC+02:00)	Fahmi (yellow card) 44'; D'Amico (yellow card) 64'	Report	Di Vaio (yellow card) 20'; Sensini 28'; Boghossian (yellow card) 44'; Cannavaro (yellow card) 68'	Stadium: Stade Grimonprez-Jooris; Attendance: 14,358; Referee: Graham Poll (England)

=== UEFA Cup ===
==== First round ====
20 September 2001 First leg	Parma (Italy)	1–0	(Finland) HJK	Parma, Italy
18:30 CEST (UTC+02:00)	Milošević 21' (pen.)	Report	Heinola (yellow card) 23'; Jensen (yellow card) 85'	Stadium: Stadio Ennio Tardini; Referee: Alan Freeland (Scotland)

4 October 2001 Second leg	HJK (Finland)	0–2 (0–3 agg.)	(Italy) Parma	Helsinki, Finland
18:00 CEST (UTC+02:00)		Report	Bolaño (yellow card) 60'; Marchionni 79'; Bonazzoli 90'	Stadium: Finnair Stadium; Referee: Tomasz Mikulski (Poland)

==== Second round ====
25 October 2001 First leg	Utrecht (Netherlands)	1–3	(Italy) Parma	Utrecht, Netherlands
20:45 CEST (UTC+02:00)	Tanghe (yellow card) 18'; Jochemsen (yellow card) 57', (goal) 76'; Vreven (yellow card) 90+3'	Report	Di Vaio 22', 69', (yellow card) 43'; Lamouchi (yellow card) 23'; Sartor (yellow card) 40'; Bonazzoli 55'; Marchionni (yellow card) 90+3'	Stadium: Stadion Galgenwaard; Referee: Sorin Corpodean (Romania)

8 November 2001 Second leg	Parma (Italy)	0–0 (3–1 agg.)	(Netherlands) Utrecht	Parma, Italy
20:45 CET (UTC+01:00)	Lamouchi (yellow card) 64'	Report		Stadium: Stadio Ennio Tardini; Referee: Helmut Fleischer (Germany)

==== Third round ====
29 November 2001 First leg	Parma (Italy)	1–1	(Denmark) Brøndby	Parma, Italy
18:30 CET (UTC+01:00)	Lamouchi 1'; Appiah (yellow card) 34'; Milošević (yellow card) 88'; Júnior (red card) 90'	Report	Johansen (yellow card) 28'; Ravn (yellow card) 88'; Nordin 90' (pen.)	Stadium: Stadio Ennio Tardini; Referee: Konrad Plautz (Austria)

13 December 2001 Second leg	Brøndby (Denmark)	0–3 (1–4 agg.)	(Italy) Parma	Brøndby, Denmark
17:30 CET (UTC+01:00)		Report	M'Boma 44'; Nakata 58'; Lamouchi 82'	Stadium: Brøndby Stadium; Referee: Ľuboš Micheľ (Slovakia)

==== Fourth round ====
21 February 2002 First leg	Hapoel Tel Aviv (Israel)	0–0	(Italy) Parma	Tel Aviv, Israel
17:30 CET (UTC+01:00)	Domb (yellow card) 20'; Abukasis (yellow card) 88'; Elimelech (yellow card) 90+2'	Report	Nakata (yellow card) 34'; Benarrivo (yellow card) 74'	Stadium: Bloomfield Stadium

28 February 2002 Second leg	Parma (Italy)	1–2 (1–2 agg.)	(Israel) Hapoel Tel Aviv	Parma, Italy
18:15 CET (UTC+01:00)	Bonazzoli 85'	Report	Osterc 31'; Pisont 54'	Stadium: Stadio Ennio Tardini; Referee: Jacek Granat (Poland)

== Statistics ==
=== Appearances and goals ===
No.	Pos	Nat	Player	Total		Serie A		Coppa Italia		Europe	
No.	Pos	Nat	Player	Apps	Goals	Apps	Goals	Apps	Goals	Apps	Goals
1	GK	(France) FRA	Frey	39	0	29	0	0	0	10	0
23	DF	(Italy) ITA	Diana	21	1	16+5	1	0	0	0	0
74	DF	(France) FRA	Djetou	32	1	22+1	1	0	0	9	0
17	DF	(Italy) ITA	Cannavaro	40	1	31	1	0	0	9	0
7	DF	(Italy) ITA	Sartor	26	0	18+1	0	0	0	7	0
10	MF	(Japan) JPN	Nakata	32	2	17+7	1	0	0	7+1	1
8	MF	(France) FRA	Lamouchi	39	5	31	3	0	0	6+2	2
25	MF	(Argentina) ARG	Almeyda	23	0	18	0	0	0	4+1	0
16	MF	(Brazil) BRA	Júnior	36	0	28	0	0	0	6+2	0
20	FW	(Italy) ITA	Di Vaio	43	22	32+1	20	0	0	8+2	2
22	FW	(Italy) ITA	Bonazzoli	34	8	17+10	5	0	0	5+2	3
30	GK	(Brazil) BRA	Taffarel	5	0	5	0	0	0	0	0
14	MF	(France) FRA	Boghossian	26	1	15+5	1	0	0	5+1	0
6	DF	(Argentina) ARG	Sensini	22	1	15+1	0	0	0	6	1
21	DF	(Italy) ITA	Ferrari	20	0	14+2	0	0	0	3+1	0
29	MF	(Colombia) COL	Bolaño	19	0	12+2	0	0	0	5	0
18	MF	(France) FRA	Micoud	20	5	11+7	5	0	0	0+2	0
11	FW	(Turkey) TUR	Sukur	18	3	10+5	3	2	0	1	0
3	DF	(Italy) ITA	Benarrivo	12	0	7+2	0	0	0	2+1	0
32	MF	(Italy) ITA	Marchionni	28	1	6+14	0	0	0	4+4	1
4	MF	(Ghana) GHA	Appiah	20	1	6+7	1	0	0	2+5	0
83	GK	(Italy) ITA	De Lucia	2	0	0+2	0	0	0	0	0
15	DF	(Belarus) BLR	Gurenko	6	0	0+2	0	0	0	3+1	0
13	MF	(Italy) ITA	Maini	2	0	0+2	0	0	0	0	0
19	FW	(Italy) ITA	Grieco	1	0	0+1	0	0	0	0	0
36	MF	(Italy) ITA	Saccani	1	0	0	0	0	0	0+1	0
Players transferred out during the season
2	DF	(Italy) ITA	Falsini	8	0	5+1	0	0	0	2	0
5	DF	(Italy) ITA	Torrisi	5	0	3+2	0	0	0	0	0
9	FW	(Federal Republic of Yugoslavia) YUG	Milosevic	16	2	5+5	1	0	0	3+3	1
24	DF	(Italy) ITA	Mangone	2	0	0+1	0	0	0	1	0
26	MF	(Italy) ITA	Bachini	2	0	0+1	0	0	0	1	0
70	FW	(Cameroon) CMR	M'boma	6	1	2+2	0	0	0	1+1	1

Last updated: 31 May 2002
Source: Competitions
