= 1998–99 Parma AC season =

Parma
1998–99 season
- Owner: Parmalat
- President: Calisto Tanzi
- Manager: Alberto Malesani
- Stadium: Stadio Ennio Tardini
- Serie A: 4th
- Coppa Italia: Winners
- UEFA Cup: Winners
- Top goalscorer: League: Hernán Crespo (16); All: Hernán Crespo (28)
Home colours	Away colours	Third colours

The 1998–99 season was Parma Associazione Calcio's 9th season in Serie A. The club competed in Serie A, finishing fourth, and won both the Coppa Italia and the UEFA Cup.

== Season review ==
Parma won two trophies in the club's most successful season. The Coppa Italia win over Fiorentina was followed by a spectacular 3–0 victory against French giants Marseille in the UEFA Cup final. In the league, Parma could not quite match Milan and Lazio, but managed to clinch the fourth and final Champions League spot.

In the summer, Parma was hit by the departure of playmaker Juan Sebastián Verón to Lazio. The club brought in Ariel Ortega as his replacement, but clearly lost a key ingredient in its perennial championship challenge.

== Players ==
=== Squad information ===
Squad at end of season

Note: Flags indicate national team as defined under FIFA eligibility rules; some limited exceptions apply. Players may hold more than one non-FIFA nationality.

No.	Pos.	Nation	Player
1	GK	ITA	Gianluigi Buffon
2	MF	FRA	Reynald Pedros
3	DF	ITA	Antonio Benarrivo
4	DF	ITA	Luigi Sartor
5	DF	ITA	Luigi Apolloni
6	DF	ARG	Roberto Sensini
7	MF	ITA	Diego Fuser
8	MF	ITA	Dino Baggio
9	FW	ARG	Hernán Crespo
10	FW	COL	Faustino Asprilla
11	MF	ARG	Juan Sebastián Verón
12	GK	ITA	Matteo Guardalben
13	MF	CRO	Mario Stanić
14	DF	ITA	Roberto Mussi

No.	Pos.	Nation	Player
15	MF	FRA	Alain Boghossian
17	DF	ITA	Fabio Cannavaro
18	FW	ARG	Abel Balbo
19	MF	ITA	Pierluigi Orlandini
20	FW	ITA	Enrico Chiesa
21	DF	FRA	Lilian Thuram
22	GK	ITA	Alessandro Nista
23	MF	ITA	Stefano Fiore
24	DF	ITA	Paolo Vanoli
25	MF	ITA	Raffaele Longo
27	FW	TOG	Mohamed Kader
28	GK	ITA	Davide Micillo
31	FW	ITA	Gianluca De Angelis

=== Transfers ===
In
Pos.	Name	from	Type
MF	Juan Veron	Sampdoria	
MF	Alain Boghossian	Sampdoria	
DF	Paolo Vanoli	Hellas Verona	
FW	Faustino Asprilla	Newcastle United	
MF	Diego Fuser	Lazio	

Out
Pos.	Name	To	Type
MF	Jesper Blomqvist	Manchester United	
MF	Massimo Crippa	Torino	
DF	Zé Maria	Perugia	
MF	Pietro Strada	Perugia	
FW	Adaílton	Paris Saint-Germain	loan

==== Left club on loan during season ====
Note: Flags indicate national team as defined under FIFA eligibility rules; some limited exceptions apply. Players may hold more than one non-FIFA nationality.

No.	Pos.	Nation	Player
16	DF	CIV	Saliou Lassissi (on loan to Sampdoria)

==== Sold by club during season ====
Note: Flags indicate national team as defined under FIFA eligibility rules; some limited exceptions apply. Players may hold more than one non-FIFA nationality.

No.	Pos.	Nation	Player
26	MF	ITA	Federico Giunti (to Milan)
26	DF	ITA	Giuseppe Cardone (to Vicenza)

== Competitions ==
=== Overall ===
Competition	Started round	Current position	Final position	First match	Last match
Serie A	Matchday 1	—	4th	12 September 1998	23 May 1999
Coppa Italia	Round of 16	—	Winners	9 September 1998	5 May 1999
UEFA Cup	First round	—	Winners	15 September 1998	12 May 1999

Last updated: 23 May 1999

=== Serie A ===
==== League table ====
Pos	Team	Pld	W	D	L	GF	GA	GD	Pts	Qualification or relegation
2	Lazio	34	20	9	5	65	31	+34	69	Qualification to Champions League group stage
3	Fiorentina	34	16	8	10	55	41	+14	56	Qualification to Champions League third qualifying round
4	Parma	34	15	10	9	55	36	+19	55	Qualification to Champions League third qualifying round
5	Roma	34	15	9	10	69	49	+20	54 (Note: ROM 7pts. JUV 5pts. UDI 4pts.)	Qualification to UEFA Cup first round
6	Udinese (Note: Udinese gained entry to the 1999–2000 UEFA Cup winning the UEFA Cup qualification match against Juventus)	34	16	6	12	52	52	0	54	Qualification to UEFA Cup first round

Source: Serie A, RSSSF.com, Soccerway
Rules for classification: 1) Points; 2) Head-to-head points; 3) Head-to-head goal difference; 4) Goal difference; 5) Goals scored; 6) Draw. (Note: Head-to-head record is used only after all the matches between the teams in question have been played).

==== Results summary ====
Overall								Home						Away					
Pld	W	D	L	GF	GA	GD	Pts	W	D	L	GF	GA	GD	W	D	L	GF	GA	GD
34	15	10	9	55	36	+19	55	9	6	2	27	13	+14	6	4	7	28	23	+5

Last updated: 23 May 1999.
Source: Competitive matches

==== Results by round ====
Round	1	2	3	4	5	6	7	8	9	10	11	12	13	14	15	16	17	18	19	20	21	22	23	24	25	26	27	28	29	30	31	32	33	34
Ground	H	A	H	A	H	A	H	A	H	A	H	A	H	A	H	A	H	A	H	A	H	A	H	A	H	A	H	A	H	A	H	A	H	A
Result	D	D	W	D	W	L	W	D	W	L	W	W	D	W	W	W	L	D	D	W	D	W	W	L	W	L	D	L	D	L	W	W	L	L
Position	6	8	7	7	5	7	5	5	4	5	2	2	3	2	2	1	2	3	4	3	4	4	2	4	2	4	4	4	4	4	4	3	3	4

Updated to match(es) played on 23 May 1999. Source: Competitive matches
A = Away; H = Home; W = Win; D = Draw; L = Loss; = Leader, 1999-2000 UEFA Champions League; = 1999-2000 UEFA Champions League; = 1999-2000 UEFA Champions League Qualifying round; = 1999-2000 UEFA Cup; = 1999 UEFA Intertoto Cup; = 1999-2000 Serie B

==== Matches ====
12 September 1998 1	Parma	0–0	Vicenza	Parma
		Report		Stadium: Stadio Ennio Tardini; Referee: Massimo De Santis

20 September 1998 2	Venezia	0–0	Parma	Venice
		Report		Stadium: Stadio Pier Luigi Penzo; Referee: Robert Anthony Boggi

26 September 1998 3	Parma	1–0	Juventus	Parma
	D. Baggio 47'	Report		Stadium: Stadio Ennio Tardini; Referee: Cosimo Bolognino

4 October 1998 4	Bologna	0–0	Parma	Bologna
		Report		Stadium: Stadio Renato Dall'Ara; Referee: Domenico Messina

17 October 1998 5	Parma	2–0	Salernitana	Parma
	Chiesa 73'; Fuser 81'	Report		Stadium: Stadio Ennio Tardini; Referee: Graziano Cesari

25 October 1998 6	Perugia	2–1	Parma	Perugia
	Rapaić 10'; Bucchi 28'	Report	Chiesa 1'	Stadium: Stadio Renato Curi; Referee: Gennaro Borriello

31 October 1998 7	Parma	2–0	Fiorentina	Parma
	Crespo 36', 52'	Report		Stadium: Stadio Ennio Tardini; Referee: Piero Ceccarini

8 November 1998 8	Bari	1–1	Parma	Bari
	Masinga 76'	Report	Fuser 45+1'	Stadium: Stadio San Nicola; Referee: Pasquale Rodomonti

15 November 1998 9	Parma	4–1	Udinese	Parma
	Crespo 4', 37', 65' (pen.); Stanić 88'	Report	Amoroso 36'	Stadium: Stadio Ennio Tardini; Referee: Gennaro Borriello

21 November 1998 10	Cagliari	1–0	Parma	Cagliari
	Kallon 77'	Report		Stadium: Stadio Sant'Elia; Referee: Daniele Tombolini

29 November 1998 11	Parma	4–0	Milan	Parma
	Chiesa 25'; Crespo 36', 59'; Boghossian 90'	Report		Stadium: Stadio Ennio Tardini; Referee: Massimo De Santis

5 December 1998 12	Sampdoria	0–2	Parma	Genoa
		Report	Chiesa 45', 47'	Stadium: Stadio Luigi Ferraris; Referee: Fiorenzo Treossi

13 December 1998 13	Parma	1–1	Roma	Parma
	Crespo 40'	Report	Gautieri 62'	Stadium: Stadio Ennio Tardini; Referee: Robert Anthony Boggi

20 December 1998 14	Empoli	3–5	Parma	Empoli
	Pane 10'; Di Napoli 24', 90+1'	Report	Crespo 11'; Boghossian 45+3'; Fuser 57', 90+2'; Fiore 83'	Stadium: Stadio Carlo Castellani; Referee: Robert Anthony Boggi

6 January 1999 15	Parma	1–0	Internazionale	Parma
	Fuser 54'	Report		Stadium: Stadio Ennio Tardini; Referee: Alfredo Trentalange

10 January 1999 16	Piacenza	3–6	Parma	Piacenza
	S. Inzaghi 17', 75' (pen.); Cristallini 58'	Report	Boghossian 13'; Balbo 52', 63', 65'; Fuser 67'; Crespo 83'	Stadium: Stadio Leonardo Garilli; Referee: Fiorenzo Treossi

17 January 1999 17	Parma	1–3	Lazio	Parma
	Crespo 54'	Report	Salas 51' (pen.); Mancini 68'; Vieri 90+1'	Stadium: Stadio Ennio Tardini; Referee: Livio Bazzoli

24 January 1999 18	Vicenza	0–0	Parma	Vicenza
		Report		Stadium: Stadio Romeo Menti; Referee: Pasquale Rodomonti

31 January 1999 19	Parma	2–2	Venezia	Parma
	D. Baggio 16'; Chiesa 86'	Report	Maniero 45', 52'	Stadium: Stadio Ennio Tardini; Referee: Livio Bazzoli

7 February 1999 20	Juventus	2–4	Parma	Turin
	Tacchinardi 15'; Fonseca 72'	Report	Crespo 35', 40', 58'; Chiesa 39'	Stadium: Stadio delle Alpi; Referee: Robert Anthony Boggi

14 February 1999 21	Parma	1–1	Bologna	Parma
	Stanić 90+1'	Report	Kolyvanov 23'	Stadium: Stadio Ennio Tardini; Referee: Cosimo Bolognino

21 February 1999 22	Salernitana	1–2	Parma	Salerno
	Di Vaio 85'	Report	Cannavaro 42'; Stanić 55'	Stadium: Stadio Arechi; Referee: Pierluigi Collina

27 February 1999 23	Parma	3–1	Perugia	Parma
	Chiesa 31' (pen.), 44'; Crespo 81'	Report	Bucchi 60'	Stadium: Stadio Ennio Tardini; Referee: Gennaro Borriello

7 March 1999 24	Fiorentina	2–1	Parma	Florence
	Oliveira 42'; Rui Costa 55' (pen.)	Report	Stanić 64'	Stadium: Stadio Artemio Franchi; Referee: Pasquale Rodomonti

13 March 1999 25	Parma	2–1	Bari	Parma
	Verón 57'; Crespo 77'	Report	Masinga 3'	Stadium: Stadio Ennio Tardini; Referee: Robert Anthony Boggi

21 March 1999 26	Udinese	2–1	Parma	Udine
	Sosa 22'; Amoroso 89'	Report	Vanoli 69'	Stadium: Stadio Friuli; Referee: Fiorenzo Treossi

3 April 1999 27	Parma	1–1	Cagliari	Parma
	Stanić 18'	Report	Muzzi 57' (pen.)	Stadium: Stadio Ennio Tardini; Referee: Pasquale Rodomonti

11 April 1999 28	Milan	2–1	Parma	Milan
	Maldini 59'; Ganz 72'	Report	Balbo 39'	Stadium: San Siro; Referee: Massimo De Santis

17 April 1999 29	Parma	1–1	Sampdoria	Parma
	Sensini 43'	Report	Montella 53' (pen.)	Stadium: Stadio Ennio Tardini; Referee: Daniele Tombolini

25 April 1999 30	Roma	1–0	Parma	Rome
	Totti 82'	Report		Stadium: Stadio Olimpico; Referee: Roberto Bettin

2 May 1999 31	Parma	1–0	Empoli	Parma
	Stanić 9'	Report		Stadium: Stadio Ennio Tardini; Referee: Piero Ceccarini

8 May 1999 32	Internazionale	1–3	Parma	Milan
	Ronaldo 25'	Report	Stanić 47'; Asprilla 49'; Fuser 62'	Stadium: San Siro; Referee: Salvatore Racalbuto

16 May 1999 33	Parma	0–1	Piacenza	Parma
		Report	S. Inzaghi 31'	Stadium: Stadio Ennio Tardini; Referee: Piero Ceccarini

23 May 1999 34	Lazio	2–1	Parma	Rome
	Salas 27', 76'	Report	Vanoli 54'	Stadium: Stadio Olimpico; Referee: Livio Bazzoli

=== Coppa Italia ===
==== Round of 32 ====
9 September 1998 First leg	Parma	3–0	Genoa	Parma
	Boghossian 14'; Balbo 34'; Crespo 58'			Stadium: Stadio Ennio Tardini

23 September 1998 Second leg	Genoa	0–1 (0–4 agg.)	Parma	Genoa
			Asprilla 78'	Stadium: Stadio Luigi Ferraris; Referee: Luciano Fausti

==== Round of 16 ====
28 October 1998 First leg	Bari	1–2	Parma	Bari
	Marcolini 81'		Asprilla 74'; Garzya 90+2' (o.g.)	Stadium: Stadio San Nicola; Attendance: 9,000; Referee: Stefano Farina

11 November 1998 Second leg	Parma	0–0 (2–1 agg.)	Bari	Parma
				Stadium: Stadio Ennio Tardini

==== Quarter-finals ====
1 December 1998 First leg	Udinese	3–2	Parma	Udine
	Appiah 40'; Amoroso 46'; Navas 90+2'		Balbo 42'; Crespo 76'	Stadium: Stadio Friuli; Attendance: 7,000; Referee: Graziano Cesari

27 January 1999 Second leg	Parma	4–0 (6–3 agg.)	Udinese	Parma
	Verón 14'; Crespo 18', 74'; Balbo 90'			Stadium: Stadio Ennio Tardini; Referee: Pierluigi Collina

==== Semi-finals ====
17 February 1999 First leg	Internazionale	0–2	Parma	Milan
			Verón 76'; Balbo 86'	Stadium: San Siro; Referee: Stefano Braschi

9 March 1999 Second leg	Parma	2–1 (4–1 agg.)	Internazionale	Parma
	Chiesa 4'; Verón 36'		Zamorano 10'	Stadium: Stadio Ennio Tardini; Referee: Massimo De Santis

==== Final ====
14 April 1999 First leg	Parma	1–1	Fiorentina	Parma
	Crespo 16'		Batistuta 81'	Stadium: Stadio Ennio Tardini; Attendance: 21,038; Referee: Domenico Messina

5 May 1999 Second leg	Fiorentina	2–2 (3–3a agg.)	Parma	Florence
	Řepka 48'; Cois 62'		Crespo 42'; Vanoli 71'	Stadium: Stadio Artemio Franchi; Attendance: 39,070; Referee: Stefano Braschi

=== UEFA Cup ===
==== First round ====
15 September 1998 First leg	Fenerbahçe (Turkey)	1–0	(Italy) Parma	Istanbul, Turkey
19:00 CEST (UTC+02:00)	Moldovan 23'; Murat (yellow card) 81'	Report	Stanić (yellow card) 17'; D. Baggio (yellow card) 59' (yellow-red card); Cannavaro (yellow card) 89'	Stadium: Şükrü Saracoğlu Stadium; Attendance: 32,000; Referee: Paul Durkin (England)

29 September 1998 Second leg	Parma (Italy)	3–1 (3–2 agg.)	(Turkey) Fenerbahçe	Parma, Italy
20:45 CEST (UTC+02:00)	Saffet 22' (o.g.); Benarrivo (yellow card) 37'; Crespo 44'; Boghossian 72'; Fuser (yellow card) 75'; Asprilla (yellow card) 76'	Report	Murat (yellow card) 12'; Baljić 58'; Høgh (yellow card) 62'	Stadium: Stadio Ennio Tardini; Attendance: 12,480; Referee: Juan Antonio Fernández Marín (Spain)

==== Second round ====
20 October 1998 First leg	Wisła Kraków (Poland)	1–1	(Italy) Parma	Kraków, Poland
14:30 CEST (UTC+02:00)	Kulawik 68'; Kaliciak (yellow card) 80'	Report	Chiesa 2'; Thuram (yellow card) 27'; Cannavaro (yellow card) 44'; Fuser (yellow card) 80'	Stadium: Stadion Miejski; Attendance: 12,000; Referee: Marcel Lică (Romania)

3 November 1998 Second leg	Parma (Italy)	2–1 (3–2 agg.)	(Poland) Wisła Kraków	Parma, Italy
19:00 CET (UTC+01:00)	Fiore (yellow card) 8', (goal) 20'; Zając 46' (o.g.)	Report	Bukalski (yellow card) 46'; Matyja (yellow card) 49'; Zając 90'	Stadium: Stadio Ennio Tardini; Attendance: 9,000; Referee: Alain Hamer (Luxembourg)

==== Third round ====
24 November 1998 First leg	Rangers (Scotland)	1–1	(Italy) Parma	Glasgow, Scotland
20:45 CET (UTC+01:00)	Ferguson (yellow card) 17'; Wallace 60'	Report	Balbo (yellow card) 6', (goal) 51'; Stanić (yellow card) 12'	Stadium: Ibrox Stadium; Attendance: 49,514; Referee: Alain Sars (France)

8 December 1998 Second leg	Parma (Italy)	3–1 (4–2 agg.)	(Scotland) Rangers	Parma, Italy
14:30 CET (UTC+01:00)	Balbo 47'; Fiore 64'; Chiesa 68' (pen.)	Report	Albertz 28'; Porrini (yellow card) 45' (yellow-red card); Van Bronckhorst (yellow card) 61'; Miller (yellow card) 90'	Stadium: Stadio Ennio Tardini; Attendance: 22,000; Referee: Terje Hauge (Norway)

==== Quarter-finals ====
2 March 1999 First leg	Bordeaux (France)	2–1	(Italy) Parma	Bordeaux, France
19:30 CET (UTC+01:00)	Ferrier (yellow card) 30'; Micoud 39'; Wiltord 45'	Report	Stanić (yellow card) 36'; Cannavaro (yellow card) 64'; Benarrivo (yellow card) 82' (yellow-red card); Crespo 85'; Buffon (yellow card) 90'	Stadium: Stade du Parc Lescure; Attendance: 31,500; Referee: Vítor Melo Pereira (Portugal)

16 March 1999 Second leg	Parma (Italy)	6–0 (7–2 agg.)	(France) Bordeaux	Parma, Italy
18:30 CET (UTC+01:00)	Crespo 37', 66'; Chiesa 42', 59'; Sensini 48'; Cannavaro (yellow card) 54'; Balbo 89' (pen.)	Report	Pavon (yellow card) 44'; Saveljić (yellow card) 48'	Stadium: Stadio Ennio Tardini; Attendance: 16,400; Referee: Rune Pedersen (Norway)

==== Semi-finals ====
6 April 1999 First leg	Atlético Madrid (Spain)	1–3	(Italy) Parma	Madrid, Spain
21:30 CEST (UTC+02:00)	Juninho 22' (pen.); Chamot (yellow card) 75'; Jugović (yellow card) 83'	Report	Chiesa 14', 41'; Fiore (yellow card) 56'; Crespo 62'; Vanoli (yellow card) 69'	Stadium: Vicente Calderón; Attendance: 57,000; Referee: Nikolai Levnikov (Russia)

20 April 1999 Second leg	Parma (Italy)	2–1 (5–2 agg.)	(Spain) Atlético Madrid	Parma, Italy
21:30 CEST (UTC+02:00)	D. Baggio (yellow card) 34'; Balbo 35'; Chiesa 83'	Report	Roberto 63'; Santi (yellow card) 64'; Aguilera (yellow card) 88'	Stadium: Stadio Ennio Tardini; Attendance: 9,872; Referee: Paul Durkin (England)

==== Final ====
12 May 1999 Final	Parma (Italy)	3–0	(France) Marseille	Moscow, Russia
20:00 CEST (UTC+02:00)	Crespo 25'; Vanoli 36'; Chiesa 55'; Asprilla (yellow card) 89'	Report	Blondeau (yellow card) 50'	Stadium: Luzhniki Stadium; Attendance: 62,000; Referee: Hugh Dallas (Scotland)

== Statistics ==
=== Appearances and goals ===
No.	Pos	Nat	Player	Total		Serie A		Coppa Italia		UEFA Cup	
No.	Pos	Nat	Player	Apps	Goals	Apps	Goals	Apps	Goals	Apps	Goals
1	GK	(Italy) ITA	Buffon	51	0	34	0	6	0	11	0
21	DF	(France) FRA	Thuram	53	0	34	0	6+2	0	11	0
17	DF	(Italy) ITA	Cannavaro	45	1	30	1	7	0	8	0
6	DF	(Argentina) ARG	Sensini	44	1	25+1	1	7+1	0	10	0
3	DF	(Italy) ITA	Benarrivo	35	0	25	0	2+1	0	6+1	0
7	MF	(Italy) ITA	Fuser	48	7	31+1	7	6+1	0	8+1	0
11	MF	(Argentina) ARG	Veron	42	5	25+1	1	6	3	10	1
8	MF	(Italy) ITA	Baggio	42	2	29	2	4+1	0	8	0
15	MF	(France) FRA	Boghossian	38	5	23+1	3	4+2	1	6+2	1
20	FW	(Italy) ITA	Chiesa	46	18	29+1	9	6+2	1	7+1	8
9	FW	(Argentina) ARG	Crespo	45	28	29+1	16	5+2	6	6+2	6
12	GK	(Italy) ITA	Guardalben	4	0	0	0	4	0	0	0
23	MF	(Italy) ITA	Fiore	47	3	16+12	1	5+4	0	6+4	2
4	DF	(Italy) ITA	Sartor	20	0	11+2	0	3	0	3+1	0
18	FW	(Argentina) ARG	Balbo	44	12	10+15	4	5+3	4	6+5	4
24	DF	(Italy) ITA	Vanoli	30	4	9+5	2	8+1	1	5+2	1
13	MF	(Croatia) CRO	Stanic	31	7	7+11	7	7	0	3+3	0
14	DF	(Italy) ITA	Mussi	31	0	3+14	0	6+2	0	2+4	0
10	FW	(Colombia) COL	Asprilla	16	3	2+6	1	2+1	2	3+2	0
25	MF	(Italy) ITA	Longo	12	0	1+3	0	4+1	0	2+1	0
19	MF	(Italy) ITA	Orlandini	20	0	0+11	0	5+1	0	0+3	0
5	DF	(Italy) ITA	Apolloni	2	0	0+2	0	0	0	0	0
26	MF	(Italy) ITA	Giunti	3	0	0+2	0	1	0	0	0
16	DF	(Ivory Coast) CIV	Lassissi	2	0	0+1	0	1	0	0	0
31	FW	(Italy) ITA	De Angelis	1	0	0+1	0	0	0	0	0

Last updated: 23 May 1999
Source: Results
