= 1999 Supercoppa Italiana =

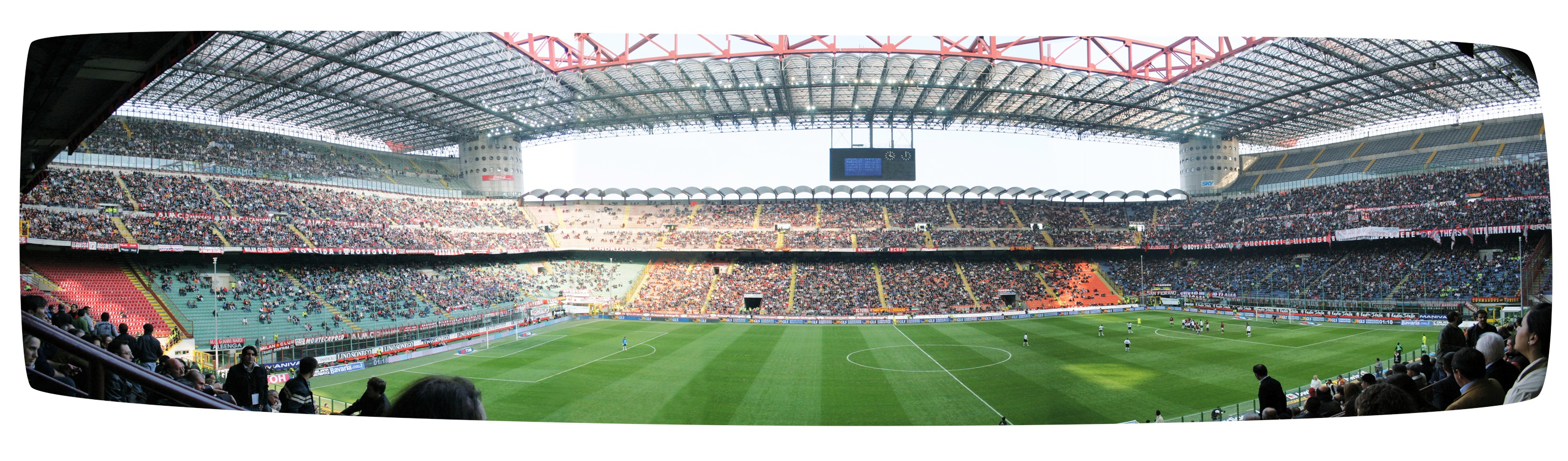
- Event: Supercoppa Italiana
AC Milan	Parma
Serie A	Coppa Italia
1	2
- Date: 21 August 1999
- Venue: San Siro, Milan, Italy
- Referee: Gennaro Borriello
- Attendance: 25,001

The 1999 Supercoppa Italiana was a match played by the 1998–99 Serie A winners AC Milan and 1998–99 Coppa Italia winners Parma. It took place on 21 August 1999 at the San Siro in Milan, Italy. Parma won the match 2–1, earning their first and to date only Supercoppa Italiana.

== Match details ==
21 August 1999
20:45 CET

AC Milan	1–2	Parma
Guly 54'	Report	Crespo 66'; Boghossian 90+2'

San Siro, Milan, Italy
Attendance: 25,001
Referee: Gennaro Borriello

AC Milan	Parma

MILAN:
GK	1	(Italy) Sebastiano Rossi
CB	25	(France) Bruno Ngotty
CB	5	(Italy) Alessandro Costacurta	Booked
CB	3	(Italy) Paolo Maldini (c)
RM	2	(Denmark) Thomas Helveg		(substituted off) 77'
CM	4	(Italy) Demetrio Albertini
CM	23	(Italy) Massimo Ambrosini
LM	24	(Argentina) Guly
RF	7	(Ukraine) Andriy Shevchenko
CF	20	(Germany) Oliver Bierhoff
LF	9	(Liberia) George Weah		(substituted off) 67'
Substitutes:
GK	22	(Italy) Roberto Colombo
CB	26	(Italy) Luigi Sala
RM	13	(France) Ibrahim Ba		(substituted on) 77'
AM	18	(Brazil) Leonardo
CM	21	(Italy) Federico Giunti		(substituted on) 67'
LM	27	(Brazil) Serginho
LF	11	(Italy) Maurizio Ganz
Manager:
(Italy) Alberto Zaccheroni

PARMA:
GK	1	(Italy) Gianluigi Buffon
RB	21	(France) Lilian Thuram (c)
CB	6	(Ivory Coast) Saliou Lassissi	(substituted off) 72'
CB	17	(Italy) Fabio Cannavaro
LB	23	(Italy) Michele Serena	(substituted off) 58'
RM	7	(Italy) Diego Fuser	(substituted off) 86'
CM	8	(Italy) Dino Baggio
LM	14	(France) Alain Boghossian
AM	10	(Argentina) Ariel Ortega
SS	20	(Italy) Marco Di Vaio
CF	9	(Argentina) Hernán Crespo
Substitutes:
GK	22	(Italy) Davide Micillo
RB	3	(Italy) Antonio Benarrivo	(substituted on) 86'
LB	19	(Italy) Stefano Torrisi	(substituted on) 72'
CB	24	(Italy) Paolo Vanoli	(substituted on) 58'
CM	4	(Italy) Roberto Breda
CM	18	(Italy) Giampiero Maini
LM	25	(Belgium) Johan Walem
Manager:
(Italy) Alberto Malesani

Supercoppa Italiana
1999 Winners
Parma
First title

MATCH OFFICIALS

- Assistant referees:
- Fourth official:

MATCH RULES

- 90 minutes.
- 30 minutes of extra-time if necessary.
- Penalty shoot-out if scores still level.
- Seven named substitutes
- Maximum of 3 substitutions.

== See also ==
- 1999–2000 AC Milan season
- 1999–2000 Parma AC season
