= Paolo Cannavaro =

Italian footballer (born 1981)

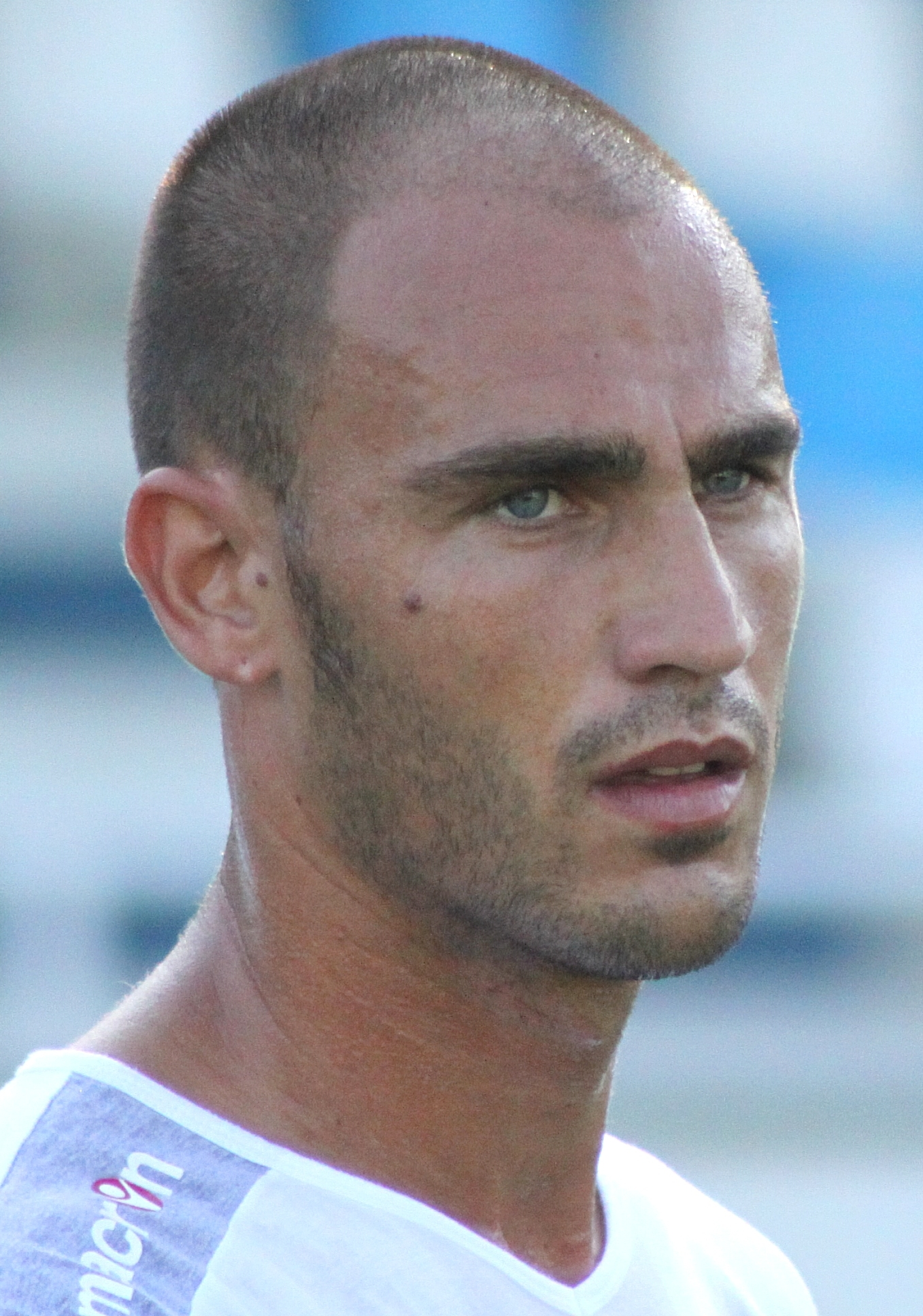
- Cannavaro in 2009

Personal information
- Full name: Paolo Cannavaro
- Date of birth: 26 June 1981 (age 45)
- Place of birth: Naples, Italy
- Height: 1.85 m (6 ft 1 in)
- Position: Centre back

Youth career
- 1995–1998: Napoli

Senior career*
Years	Team	Apps	(Gls)
1998–1999	Napoli	2	(0)
1999–2006	Parma	92	(4)
2001–2002	→ Hellas Verona (loan)	24	(1)
2006–2014	Napoli	236	(8)
2014	→ Sassuolo (loan)	16	(0)
2014–2017	Sassuolo	94	(1)
Total		464	(14)

International career
1996	Italy U16	2	(0)
1996	Italy U17	3	(0)
1999–2000	Italy U19	6	(0)
2001	Italy U20	1	(0)
2002–2004	Italy U21	18	(0)

Managerial career
- 2018-2021: Guangzhou Evergrande (assistant)
- 2022-2023: Benevento (assistant)
- 2024: Udinese (assistant)
- 2024: Pro Vercelli
- 2026-: Uzbekistan (assistant)
- * Club domestic league appearances and goals

Paolo Cannavaro (Italian pronunciation: [ˈpaːolo kannaˈvaːro]; born 26 June 1981) is an Italian former professional footballer who played as a centre-back and most recently was the head coach of Serie C club Pro Vercelli.

After beginning his career with Napoli, Cannavaro moved to Parma in 1999, where he played alongside his older brother Fabio. Paolo remained with the club for seven seasons, aside from a loan spell with Hellas Verona during the 2001–02 season, helping the club reach the semi-finals of the UEFA Cup in 2005. In 2006, he returned to Napoli, where he was eventually named the club's captain and contributed to the club's resurgence: he helped the team to earn promotion to Serie A in his first season and subsequently aided his side to qualify for the UEFA Cup in 2008, earn a spot in the Champions League in 2011 and win the Coppa Italia in 2012, the club's first title in over 20 years. After eight seasons with Napoli, he moved to Sassuolo in 2014, where he remained until his retirement in 2017.

== Early life ==
Cannavaro was born in Naples on 26 June 1981. He is the younger brother of former football defender Fabio Cannavaro. His nephew and son of Fabio Cannavaro, Christian, is also a footballer, who currently plays as a midfielder for Benevento and previously played for Paolo's former club Sassuolo.

His son Manuel (born in 2002) is also a footballer, in the role of central midfielder.

== Club career ==
=== Early career ===
Cannavaro made his professional debut for his hometown side Napoli during the 1998–99 season in Serie B, while he was 17 years old. The following season he was signed by Parma, playing alongside his older brother Fabio in his first season at the club. Paolo's debut for Parma came when he replaced his brother as a substitute in Parma's 4–1 victory against Lecce.

=== Parma and Verona ===
Verona took the player on loan during the 2001–02 season; Cannavaro made 25 appearances for the club, scoring his first professional goal. The following year he returned to Parma where he spent much of the time as a substitute for the following two seasons (2002–03 and 2003–04). During the 2004–05 season, Cannavaro became more active in the first team at Parma, making 24 appearances and scoring 4 goals from defence, also helping the club to reach the 2004–05 UEFA Cup semi-final.

=== Napoli ===
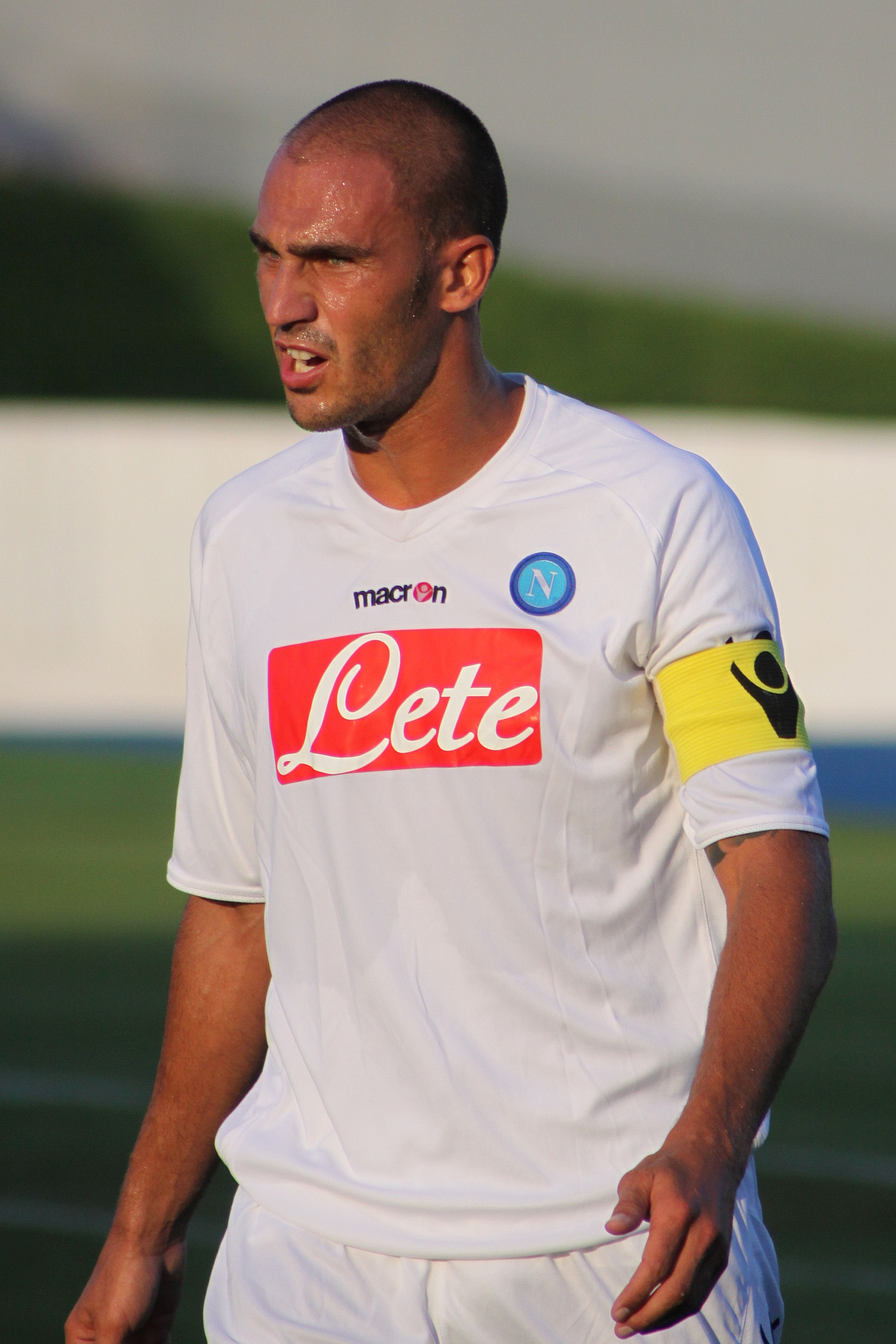
Cannavaro captaining Napoli in 2009

As Napoli had been recently promoted back into Serie B and were looking to build a squad with potential, Cannavaro was brought back to his first club in 2006. After helping to re-establish the club in the top flight of Italian football in his first season back, Cannavaro was installed as the team's captain the following season and subsequently played a key role in the club's resurgence, helped his team to qualify for the UEFA Cup in 2008: he later also helped his team to earn a spot in the Champions League in 2011 and lifted the club's first major trophy in more than 20 years when Napoli defeated Juventus 2–0 in the Coppa Italia final in Rome on 20 May 2012.

The following season, Napoli were defeated by Juventus 4–2 in extra time in the 2012 Supercoppa Italiana in Beijing on 11 August.

=== Sassuolo ===
On 31 January 2014, Cannavaro joined Sassuolo on loan for the remainder of the season for free, helping the newly promoted club to avoid relegation. Sassuolo signed Cannavaro outright for a fee of €1,000 in the summer of 2014 on a three-year contract.

In December 2017, Cannavaro announced that he would be retiring from professional football at the end of the month; he made his final appearance in Serie A on 30 December, in a 1–1 away draw against Roma.

== International career ==
As a youngster, Cannavaro played for Italy under-21 national football team on 18 occasions between 2002 and 2004, notably representing the Italy under-21 side at the 2002 UEFA European Under-21 Championship, where they reached the semi-finals. He followed in the footsteps of his older brother by earning his first and only call up for the Italian national senior team under manager Roberto Donadoni, on 13 October 2007, for a friendly match in Florence against South Africa on 17 October, although he did not make an appearance during the match.

== Player profile ==
Cannavaro was known in particular for his ability in the air. He was known for his ability to create chances or start attacking plays from the back after winning back possession...

== Coaching career ==
=== Assistant coaching roles ===
Following his retirement from professional football in December 2017, Paolo joined his brother, manager Fabio Cannavaro, on the technical staff at Chinese Super League club Guangzhou Evergrande. They stayed at Guangzhou until September 2021, when they tended their resignations.

He served as Fabio Cannavaro's assistant at Serie B club Benevento from September 2022 to February 2023, and Udinese in the final part of the 2023–24 season.

=== Pro Vercelli ===
On 29 June 2024, Cannavaro took on his first head coaching job at Serie C club Pro Vercelli. On 28 November 2024, after a lacklustre start of the season, Cannavaro resigned from his post at Pro Vercelli together with his entire coaching staff composed by assistant Rolando Bianchi and fitness coach Nicandro Vizoco.

== Controversy ==
In December 2012, Cannavaro was handed a six-month ban for failing to report an attempt of match fixing by then-Napoli goalkeeper Matteo Gianello. On 17 January 2013, the ban was revoked by the FIGC after appeal and Napoli's two-point deduction was reversed.

In February 2015, Cannavaro, his brother Fabio and his sister-in-law Daniela were respectively handed six-month, ten-month and four-month prison sentences for breaching orders and entering Fabio's residence after it had been seized by authorities in 2009, amid an investigation into fraudulent activity and tax evasion; all three have appealed and will have their sentences suspended until the final judgement has been made.

In November 2017, following the Italy national football team's failure to qualify for the 2018 FIFA World Cup, Cannavaro drew criticism in the media over a controversial Instagram post in which he blamed Italy missing out on the upcoming tournament on the influx of non-Italian footballers in Serie A over the previous 15 years.

In July 2018, Cannavaro and former Napoli footballers Pepe Reina and Salvatore Aronica were subject to a hearing by the Italian Football Federation over links to the Esposito brothers, high-ranking members of the Camorra criminal organisation.

== Career statistics ==
=== Club ===
As of 25 January 2018

Team	Season	League			Domestic Cup (Note: Includes appearances in the Coppa Italia, Supercoppa Italiana, UEFA Cup and Serie A Relegation tie-breakers.)		Europe			Total	
Team	Season	Comp	Games	Goals	Games	Goals	Comp	Games	Goals	Games	Goals
Napoli	1998–99	B	2	0	0	0	–	–	–	2	0
Parma	1999–2000	A	1	0	0	0	–	–	–	1	0
Parma	2000–01	A	4	0	3	0	UC	4	0	11	0
Verona	2001–02	A	24	1	2	0	–	–	–	26	1
Parma	2002–03	A	14	0	2	0	–	–	–	16	0
Parma	2003–04	A	16	0	4	0	UC	6	0	26	0
Parma	2004–05	A	28	1	3	0	UC	12	0	43	1
Parma	2005–06	A	29	3	2	0	–	–	–	31	3
Parma total			92	4	14	0		22	0	128	4
Napoli	2006–07	B	39	2	4	1	–	–	–	43	3
Napoli	2007–08	A	34	0	5	0	–	–	–	39	0
Napoli	2008–09	A	30	0	1	0	I+UC	2+4	0+0	37	0
Napoli	2009–10	A	33	1	1	0	–	–	–	34	1
Napoli	2010–11	A	32	2	1	0	UEL	7	0	40	2
Napoli	2011–12	A	32	2	5	0	UCL	7	0	44	2
Napoli	2012–13	A	32	1	1	0	UEL	2	0	35	1
Napoli	2013–14	A	4	0	0	0	UEL	0	0	4	0
Napoli total			238	8	18	1		22	0	278	9
Sassuolo	2013–14	A	16	0	0	0	–	–	–	16	0
Sassuolo	2014–15	A	25	0	1	0	–	–	–	26	0
Sassuolo	2015–16	A	31	0	1	0	–	–	–	32	0
Sassuolo	2016–17	A	18	1	0	0	UEL	7	0	25	1
Sassuolo	2017–18	A	19	0	2	0	–	–	–	21	0
Sassuolo total			110	1	4	1		7	0	121	1
Career total			464	14	38	1		51	0	553	14

== Honours ==
Napoli

- Coppa Italia: 2011–12

== Notes ==
Sporting positions
Preceded by Gennaro Iezzo	Napoli captain 2007–2014	Succeeded by Marek Hamšík
