= Mario Stanić =

Croatian footballer (born 1972)

Personal information
- Date of birth: 10 April 1972 (age 54)
- Place of birth: Sarajevo, SFR Yugoslavia
- Height: 1.87 m (6 ft 2 in)
- Positions: Winger; forward

Team information
- Current team: Shakhtar Donetsk (assistant)

Youth career
- –1988: Željezničar

Senior career*
| Years | Team | Apps | (Gls) |
| 1988–1992 | Željezničar | 63 | (17) |
| 1992–1993 | Croatia Zagreb | 26 | (11) |
| 1993–1994 | Sporting Gijón | 34 | (7) |
| 1994–1995 | Benfica | 14 | (5) |
| 1995–1996 | Club Brugge | 37 | (27) |
| 1996–2000 | Parma | 77 | (19) |
| 2000–2004 | Chelsea | 59 | (7) |
| Total | | 310 | (93) |

International career
| 1991 | Yugoslavia | 2 | (0) |
| 1993 | Croatia U21 | 2 | (1) |
| 1995–2003 | Croatia | 49 | (7) |

Managerial career
- 2023–: Shakhtar Donetsk (assistant)
Medal record
Representing Croatia
| Bronze medal – third place | FIFA World Cup | 1998 |
- * Club domestic league appearances and goals

Mario Stanić (born 10 April 1972) is a Croatian former professional footballer. A versatile offensive player, he played in forward or attacking midfield positions, and was also deployed as a wing-back in the Croatia national team. He is currently assistant manager at Shakhtar Donetsk.

== Club career ==
Born in Sarajevo, Stanić started his career with hometown club Željezničar. He was considered to be one of the most talented young players in former Yugoslavia. In 1992, war in Bosnia and Herzegovina began and Stanić escaped to Slavonski Brod wading the Sava and moved to Croatia, where he played for Croatia Zagreb. After only one season, he moved to Spanish Sporting de Gijón, and year later to S.L. Benfica in Portugal. In 1995, he arrived at Club Brugge and was top scorer of the Belgian First Division that year with 20 goals. Then Parma bought him in late 1996 and he played four seasons with that side.

=== Chelsea ===
Stanić joined Chelsea on a £5.6 million transfer in June 2000. He became Vialli's third signing, after Jimmy Floyd Hasselbaink and Eiður Guðjohnsen. Stanić made his league debut in a 4–2 home win against West Ham United in August 2000, where he scored a brace, one of them a strike from 35 yards. The goal was later nominated for the Goal of the Season on BBC's Match of the Day programme.

== International career ==
After playing twice for Yugoslavia in 1991, Stanić won 49 international caps and scored seven goals for the Croatia national team between 1995 and 2003, making his international debut in a UEFA Euro 1996 qualifying against Estonia in September 1995. He made three appearances for Croatia at the Euro 1996 finals in England and went on to appear in all of the team's seven matches at the 1998 FIFA World Cup finals in France, where they won the bronze medal. At the latter tournament, he scored Croatia's first-ever World Cup goal in their opening 3–1 victory over Jamaica and assisted in Robert Jarni's opening goal in their 3–0 victory over Germany in the quarterfinals. Stanić also made two appearances for Croatia at the 2002 FIFA World Cup finals as a second-half substitute, only to see Croatia fall short of qualifying for the second round of the tournament. His last international appearance came in April 2003 as a half-time substitute in a friendly match against Sweden.

He was forced to retire at the age of 32 after developing a serious knee injury during the 2003–04 league season.

== Career statistics ==
=== Club ===
Appearances and goals by club, season and competition
| Club | Season | League | | | National Cup | | League Cup | | Continental | | Total | |
| Club | Season | Division | Apps | Goals | Apps | Goals | Apps | Goals | Apps | Goals | Apps | Goals |
|---|---|---|---|---|---|---|---|---|---|---|---|---|
| Željezničar | 1988–89 | Yugoslav First League | 0 | 0 | 0 | 0 | – | | – | | 0 | 0 |
| Željezničar | 1989–90 | Yugoslav First League | 14 | 0 | 0 | 0 | – | | – | | 14 | 0 |
| Željezničar | 1990–91 | Yugoslav First League | 28 | 1 | 1 | 0 | – | | – | | 29 | 1 |
| Željezničar | 1991–92 | Yugoslav First League | 21 | 11 | 5 | 1 | – | | – | | 26 | 12 |
| Željezničar | Total | | 63 | 12 | 6 | 1 | 0 | 0 | 0 | 0 | 69 | 13 |
| Croatia Zagreb | 1992–93 | Prva HNL | 26 | 11 | 9 | 8 | – | | – | | 35 | 19 |
| Sporting Gijón | 1993–94 | La Liga | 34 | 7 | 4 | 3 | – | | – | | 38 | 10 |
| Benfica | 1994–95 | Primeira Divisão | 13 | 5 | 1 | 0 | 1 | 0 | – | | 15 | 5 |
| Brugge | 1995–96 | Belgian First Division | 30 | 20 | 5 | 4 | 1 (Note: Appearance in Belgian Super Cup) | 0 | 4 | 1 | 40 | 25 |
| Brugge | 1996–97 | Belgian First Division | 7 | 7 | 0 | 0 | 0 | 0 | 6 | 1 | 13 | 8 |
| Brugge | Total | | 37 | 27 | 5 | 4 | 1 | 0 | 10 | 2 | 53 | 33 |
| Parma | 1996–97 | Serie A | 13 | 3 | – | | – | | – | | 13 | 3 |
| Parma | 1997–98 | Serie A | 23 | 4 | 5 | 1 | – | | 4 | 0 | 32 | 5 |
| Parma | 1998–99 | Serie A | 18 | 7 | 7 | 0 | – | | 6 | 0 | 31 | 7 |
| Parma | 1999–2000 | Serie A | 24 | 6 | 1 | 0 | 0 | 0 | 9 | 4 | 34 | 10 |
| Parma | Total | | 78 | 20 | 13 | 1 | 0 | 0 | 19 | 4 | 110 | 25 |
| Chelsea | 2000–01 | Premier League | 12 | 2 | 2 | 0 | 0 | 0 | 0 | 0 | 15 | 2 |
| Chelsea | 2001–02 | Premier League | 27 | 1 | 4 | 1 | 2 | 0 | 2 | 0 | 35 | 2 |
| Chelsea | 2002–03 | Premier League | 18 | 4 | 3 | 1 | 2 | 1 | 2 | 0 | 25 | 6 |
| Chelsea | 2003–04 | Premier League | 2 | 0 | 0 | 0 | 2 | 0 | 1 | 0 | 5 | 0 |
| Chelsea | Total | | 59 | 7 | 9 | 2 | 6 | 1 | 5 | 0 | 80 | 10 |
| Career total | | | 310 | 88 | 42 | 17 | 3 | 0 | 34 | 6 | 400 | 114 |

=== International ===
| Goal | Date | Venue | Opponent | Score | Result | Competition |
|---|---|---|---|---|---|---|
| 1 | 10 April 1996 | Gradski Vrt Stadium, Osijek, Croatia | Hungary | 4–1 | 4–1 | Friendly |
| 2 | 22 April 1998 | Gradski Vrt Stadium, Osijek, Croatia | Poland | 2–0 | 4–1 | Friendly |
| 3 | 22 April 1998 | Gradski Vrt Stadium, Osijek, Croatia | Poland | 3–0 | 4–1 | Friendly |
| 4 | 14 June 1998 | Stade Félix-Bollaert, Lens, France | Jamaica | 1–0 | 3–1 | 1998 FIFA World Cup |
| 5 | 21 August 1999 | Stadion Maksimir, Zagreb, Croatia | Malta | 1–0 | 2–1 | UEFA Euro 2000 qualifying |
| 6 | 9 October 1999 | Stadion Maksimir, Zagreb, Croatia | (Federal Republic of Yugoslavia) FR Yugoslavia | 2–2 | 2–2 | UEFA Euro 2000 qualifying |
| 7 | 26 April 2000 | Ernst-Happel-Stadion, Vienna, Austria | Austria | 2–1 | 2–1 | Friendly |

== Honours ==
Croatia Zagreb

- Prva HNL: 1992–93

Club Brugge

- Belgian First Division: 1995–96
- Belgian Cup: 1995–96

Parma

- UEFA Cup: 1998–99
- Coppa Italia: 1998–99

Chelsea

- FA Charity Shield: 2000

Croatia

- FIFA World Cup third place: 1998

Individual

- Belgian First Division Top Scorer: 1995-96
- Franjo Bučar State Award for Sport: 1998

Orders

- Order of Danica Hrvatska with face of Franjo Bučar - 1995
- Order of the Croatian Trefoil - 1998
