= Luigi Sartor =

Italian footballer

Personal information
- Date of birth: 30 January 1975 (age 51)
- Place of birth: Treviso, Italy
- Height: 1.83 m (6 ft 0 in)
- Positions: Defender; midfielder

Youth career
- Padova
- 1991–1992: Juventus

Senior career*
Years	Team	Apps	(Gls)
1992–1994	Juventus	1	(0)
1993–1994	→ Reggiana (loan)	5	(0)
1994–1997	Vicenza	64	(2)
1997–1998	Inter Milan	23	(1)
1998–2002	Parma	67	(0)
2002–2005	Roma	18	(0)
2004	→ Ancona (loan)	9	(0)
2005	→ Genoa (loan)	9	(0)
2006	Sopron	7	(0)
2007	Verona	7	(0)
2008–2009	Ternana	24	(0)
Total		234	(3)

International career
1991	Italy U17	3	(0)
1992	Italy U18	2	(0)
1996–1997	Italy U21 / Olympic	9	(0)
1998–2002	Italy	2	(0)
Medal record
Men's football
Representing Italy
UEFA European Under-21 Championship
Winner	1996 Spain
- * Club domestic league appearances and goals

Luigi Sartor (Italian pronunciation: [luˈiːdʒi sarˈtor], Venetian: [saɾˈtoɾ]; born 30 January 1975) is an Italian former professional footballer. Usually a full-back or wing-back on both flanks, he also played as a central defender.

During a 17-year professional career Sartor represented ten clubs in his country, also having a brief spell in Hungary. He amassed Serie A totals of 160 games and one goal, over the course of 12 seasons.

== Club career ==
=== Early years ===
Born in Treviso, Sartor's Serie A career got off to an inauspicious start, as he scored an own goal past goalkeeper Angelo Peruzzi on his debut (and only game) for Juventus, in a 0–2 defeat at ACF Fiorentina on 6 December 1992.

After appearing regularly at Vicenza Calcio, where he played mainly as a central defender, alongside Joachim Björklund, a second place in the league followed in 1997–98 at Inter Milan, with whom he signed a four-year contract, and won the UEFA Cup. Previously, in April 1997, he had agreed to sign for Parma AC, but eventually joined that club in the 1998 summer, adding another UEFA Cup triumph in 1998–99.

=== Roma ===
Sartor joined AS Roma in 2002 in a four-year contract, with Sebastiano Siviglia going in the opposite direction. The deal was almost a pure player exchange, with both players being tagged at about €9 million. but failed to become a team regular, with just 12 appearances in 2002–03, being behind in pecking order to Aldair, Cafú, Vincent Candela, Christian Panucci, Walter Samuel and Jonathan Zebina, and starting four matches in the place of Cafú or accompanying the Brazilian as he moved up front to the midfielder position.

Sartor was also consecutively loaned during his contract, to AC Ancona in the second half of the following campaign, and Genoa CFC in 2004–05, after only seven appearances for the capital team.

==== False accounting scandal ====
As both Sartor and Siviglia failed to impress at their new clubs, and their nominal transfer was far from they had cost, Italian media reported they might have been victims of administrative doping, which meant a club allegedly inflated the price of a player in order to increase profit. Roma had already been fined for engaging in these tactics in 2007, with youth players.

=== Late career ===
After cancelling his Roma contract in November 2005 and six months of inactivity, Sartor moved to Hungary's MFC Sopron, joining Giuseppe Signori and manager Dario Bonetti.

In December 2006, he was found guilty by a court of aggravated assault on two police officers in an away match against Piacenza Calcio as he played with Genoa, on 9 January 2005.

After a quick passage at Hellas Verona FC from Serie B, Sartor joined Serie C1 side Ternana Calcio in January 2008, playing there until June of the following year. He was arrested on 19 December 2011 for his involvement in the 2011 Italian football scandal and, on 18 June 2012, he was banned for five years.

=== Post-football career ===
In February 2021, put under house arrest after police allegedly found him growing marijuana with an accomplice.

== International career ==
Internationally, Sartor appeared for Italy at the 1996 UEFA European Under-21 Championship, as the nation emerged victorious, also competing the same year at the Atlanta Olympic Games. He played only once in both tournaments: in the former, he replaced Nicola Amoruso in the 68th minute of the semi-final match against France; in the latter, he appeared against Ghana as a starter, being replaced by Alessandro Pistone.

An unused member for the under-23s at the 1997 Mediterranean Games, Sartor made his debut for the main squad on 22 April 1998, in a friendly match with Paraguay, gaining his second and final cap four years later, against the United States.

== Honours ==
Juventus

- UEFA Cup: 1992–93

Vicenza

- Coppa Italia: 1996–97

Inter Milan

- UEFA Cup: 1997–98

Parma

- Coppa Italia: 1998–99, 2001–02
- Supercoppa Italiana: 1999
- UEFA Cup: 1998–99

Italy U21

- UEFA European Under-21 Championship: 1996
