= Davide Zoboli =

Italian footballer (born 1981)

Personal information
- Date of birth: 8 October 1981 (age 45)
- Place of birth: Parma, Italy
- Height: 1.90 m (6 ft 3 in)
- Position: Defender

Senior career*
Years	Team	Apps	(Gls)
2000–2001	Benevento	1	(0)
2001–2002	Sora	15	(0)
2002–2004	Monza	48	(2)
2004–2005	AlbinoLeffe	15	(1)
2005–2012	Brescia	170	(12)
2009–2010	→ Torino (loan)	16	(0)
2012–2016	Modena	83	(6)
2016	Darfo Boario	11	(0)
- * Club domestic league appearances and goals as of 22 September 2016

Davide Zoboli (born 8 October 1981) is an Italian former association footballer who played as a defender.

In June 2002, he was exchanged with Alex Gibbs of Monza.

He was signed by Brescia in July 2004, and made his Serie A debut on 26 September 2004, against Udinese Calcio.
