= 2001–02 Coppa Italia =

Tournament details
- Country: Italy
- Dates: 12 Aug 2001 – 10 May 2002
- Teams: 48

Final positions
- Champions: Parma (3rd title)
- Runners-up: Juventus

Tournament statistics
- Matches played: 94
- Goals scored: 258 (2.74 per match)
- Top goal scorer: Nicola Amoruso (6 goals)

The 2001–02 Coppa Italia was the 55th edition of the national domestic tournament, that begun on August 12, 2001 and ended on May 10, 2002. After losing in the finals the previous year, Parma won the 2001–02 Coppa Italia tournament for the 3rd time in club history. Parma defeated Juventus in the finals, winning on the away goals rule with an aggregate score of 2-2.

== Group stage ==
=== Group 1 ===
Pos	Team	Pld	W	D	L	GF	GA	GD	Pts
1	Genoa (B)	3	2	1	0	8	3	+5	7
2	Treviso (C)	3	1	1	1	3	3	0	4
3	Arezzo (C)	3	0	2	1	4	5	−1	2
4	Bari (B)	3	0	2	1	1	5	−4	2

Team #1	Team #2	Results
Arezzo	Genoa	2–2
Treviso	Bari	0–0
Bari	Arezzo	1–1
Genoa	Treviso	2–1
Genoa	Bari	4–0
Treviso	Arezzo	2–1

=== Group 2 ===
Pos	Team	Pld	W	D	L	GF	GA	GD	Pts
1	Como (B)	3	2	1	0	5	1	+4	7
2	Venezia (A)	3	1	2	0	4	2	+2	5
3	Cosenza (B)	3	0	2	1	3	4	−1	2
4	Ascoli (C)	3	0	1	2	2	7	−5	1

Team #1	Team #2	Results
Ascoli	Como	0–3
Cosenza	Venezia	1–1
Como	Cosenza	1–0
Venezia	Ascoli	2–0
Como	Venezia	1–1
Cosenza	Ascoli	2–2

=== Group 3 ===
Pos	Team	Pld	W	D	L	GF	GA	GD	Pts
1	Siena (B)	3	2	1	0	7	4	+3	7
2	Palermo (B)	3	2	0	1	8	4	+4	6
3	Napoli (B)	3	1	0	2	4	6	−2	3
4	Livorno (C)	3	0	1	2	2	7	−5	1

Team #1	Team #2	Results
Napoli	Siena	1–2
Palermo	Livorno	3–0
Livorno	Napoli	1–3
Siena	Palermo	4–2
Palermo	Napoli	3–0
Siena	Livorno	1–1

=== Group 4 ===
Pos	Team	Pld	W	D	L	GF	GA	GD	Pts
1	Modena (B)	3	2	0	1	4	4	0	6
2	Cagliari (B)	3	1	1	1	5	2	+3	4
3	Reggina (B)	3	1	1	1	3	5	−2	4
4	Lumezzane (C)	3	0	2	1	1	2	−1	2

Team #1	Team #2	Results
Modena	Lumezzane	1–0
Reggina	Cagliari	2–1
Cagliari	Modena	4–0
Lumezzane	Reggina	1–1
Cagliari	Lumezzane	0–0
Modena	Reggina	3–0

=== Group 5 ===
Pos	Team	Pld	W	D	L	GF	GA	GD	Pts
1	Sampdoria (B)	3	2	0	1	4	4	0	6
2	Cittadella (B)	3	2	0	1	6	3	+3	6
3	Avellino (C)	3	1	0	2	5	5	0	3
4	Monza (C)	3	1	0	2	3	6	−3	3

Team #1	Team #2	Results
Monza	Avellino	2–1
Sampdoria	Cittadella	2–0
Avellino	Sampdoria	3–0
Cittadella	Monza	3–0
Cittadella	Avellino	3–1
Monza	Sampdoria	1–2

=== Group 6 ===
Pos	Team	Pld	W	D	L	GF	GA	GD	Pts
1	Messina (B)	3	2	1	0	4	0	+4	7
2	Vicenza (B)	3	1	2	0	4	2	+2	5
3	Pescara (C)	3	1	0	2	3	7	−4	3
4	Crotone (B)	3	0	1	2	4	4	0	1

Team #1	Team #2	Results
Crotone	Vicenza	1–1
Pescara	Messina	0–3
Messina	Crotone	1–0
Vicenza	Pescara	3–1
Crotone	Pescara	1–2
Messina	Vicenza	0–0

=== Group 7 ===
Pos	Team	Pld	W	D	L	GF	GA	GD	Pts
1	Ternana (B)	3	2	1	0	6	2	+4	7
2	Chievo (A)	3	2	1	0	4	2	+2	7
3	Prato (C2)	3	1	0	2	3	5	−2	3
4	Pistoiese (B)	3	0	0	3	4	8	−4	0

Team #1	Team #2	Results
Pistoiese	Chievo	1–2
Prato	Ternana	0–2
Chievo	Prato	1–0
Ternana	Pistoiese	3–1
Pistoiese	Prato	2–3
Ternana	Chievo	1–1

=== Group 8 ===
Pos	Team	Pld	W	D	L	GF	GA	GD	Pts
1	Empoli (B)	3	2	1	0	5	1	+4	7
2	Ancona (B)	3	2	0	1	4	2	+2	6
3	Salernitana (B)	3	1	0	2	4	6	−2	3
4	Catania (C)	3	0	1	2	1	5	−4	1

Team #1	Team #2	Results
Empoli	Ancona	1–0
Salernitana	Catania	3–0
Ancona	Salernitana	3–1
Catania	Empoli	1–1
Catania	Ancona	0–1
Empoli	Salernitana	3–0

== Knockout stage ==
Second stage
Milan
bye
Modena	1	3	4
Perugia	1	6	7
Lazio
bye
Siena	1	2	3
Hellas Verona	0	3	3
Sampdoria	1	2	3
Torino	1	2	3
Juventus
bye
Empoli	1	3	4
Bologna	4	1	5
Atalanta
bye
Internazionale
bye
Ternana	4	0	4
Udinese	4	2	6
Messina	2	3	5
Lecce	1	1	2
Parma
bye
Piacenza	0	1	1
Genoa	0	1	1
Roma
bye
Como	2	2	4
Fiorentina	0	0	0
Brescia
bye

Round of 16
Milan	3	0	3
Perugia	0	0	0
Lazio	2	1	3
Siena	1	0	1
Sampdoria	1	2	3
Juventus	2	5	7
Bologna	2	0	2
Atalanta	2	0	2
Internazionale	1	2	3
Udinese	2	2	4
Messina	0	2	2
Parma	2	1	3
Piacenza	2	0	2
Roma	1	3	4
Como	1	0(3p)	1
Brescia	0	1(6p)	1

Quarter-finals
Milan	2	3	5
Lazio	1	2	3
Juventus	4	1	5
Atalanta	2	2	4
Udinese	1	0	1
Parma	1	0	0
Roma	0	0	0
Brescia	1	3	4

Semi-finals
Milan	1	1	2
Juventus	2	1	2
Parma	2	1	3
Brescia	0	2	2

Finals
Juventus	2	0	2
Parma	1	1	2

== Final ==
=== First leg ===
25 April 2002
20:50

Juventus	2–1	Parma
Amoruso 5' (pen.); Zalayeta 57'		Nakata 90'

Stadio delle Alpi, Turin
Attendance: 35,874
Referee: Pierluigi Collina

=== Second leg ===
10 May 2002
20:50

Parma	1–0	Juventus
Júnior 3'

Stadio Ennio Tardini, Parma
Attendance: 26,864
Referee: Gianluca Paparesta

Parma won on away goals rule.

== Top goalscorers ==
Rank	Player	Club	Goals
1	(Italy) Nicola Amoruso	Juventus	6
2	(Uruguay) Marcelo Zalayeta	Juventus	5
2	(Italy) Cosimo Francioso	Genoa	5
4	(Italy) Francesco Flachi	Sampdoria	4
4	(Italy) Riccardo Zampagna	Siena	4
4	(Italy) Carlo Taldo	Como	4
4	(Belgium) Luís Oliveira	Como	4
4	(Argentina) Hernán Crespo	Lazio	4
4	(Spain) Javi Moreno	Milan	4
4	(Italy) David Di Michele	Udinese	4
4	(Italy) Fabio Bazzani	Venezia, Perugia	4
