= Stefano Torrisi =

Italian footballer

Personal information
- Date of birth: 7 May 1971 (age 55)
- Place of birth: Ravenna, Italy
- Height: 1.85 m (6 ft 1 in)
- Position: Defender

Senior career*
Years	Team	Apps	(Gls)
1987–1990	Modena	44	(0)
1990–1993	Ravenna Calcio	64	(0)
1993–1994	Reggiana	21	(0)
1994–1995	Torino	22	(0)
1995–1998	Bologna	86	(0)
1998–1999	Atlético Madrid	17	(1)
1999–2002	Parma	31	(2)
2001	→ Marseille (loan)	2	(0)
2002–2004	Reggina	33	(2)
2004–2007	Bologna	61	(1)
Total		381	(6)

International career
1997	Italy	1	(0)
- * Club domestic league appearances and goals

Stefano Torrisi (Italian pronunciation: [ˈsteːfano torˈriːzi]; born 7 May 1971) is an Italian former footballer who played as a defender.

== Club career ==
Born in Ravenna, Torrisi played for Italian clubs Modena, Ravenna Calcio, Reggiana, Torino, Bologna, Reggina, and Parma throughout his career, and also had spells in Spain and France with Atlético Madrid and Marseille respectively. During his time with Reggiana he was briefly sold to Milan in the summer of 1994, but only featured in friendly matches for the club before being sold to Torino in June.

== International career ==
Along with two other debutants, Giampiero Maini and Eusebio Di Francesco, Torrisi was named in Italy's squad for the 1997 Tournoi de France under manager Cesare Maldini. At the tournament he made his first and only appearance for the national team in a 2–2 draw with France.

== Style of play ==
Torrisi was a versatile and reliable defender, who was capable of playing both as a sweeper (a position which he occupied in his early career) and as a centre-back (a position in which he played in his later career), due to his good technique and ability in the air.

== After retirement ==
Following his retirement, Torrisi worked as a pundit and later also played amateur football with Loops Ribelle in the Prima Categoria, winning the division title. He subsequently took part in an over-40 Senior Tour tennis tournament in Turkey. As of 2022, Torrisi runs a scouting agency in Prague.

== Honours ==
Modena

- Serie C1: 1989–90

Ravenna

- Serie C2: 1991–92
- Serie C1: 1992–93

Bologna

- Serie B: 1995–96

Parma

- Supercoppa Italiana: 1999
