= Raffaele Longo =

Italian footballer

Personal information
- Date of birth: 6 September 1977 (age 49)
- Place of birth: Naples, Italy
- Height: 1.78 m (5 ft 10 in)
- Position: Midfielder

Team information
- Current team: Fiorentina (assistant)

Senior career*
Years	Team	Apps	(Gls)
1994–1998	Napoli	57	(0)
1998–2000	Parma	13	(0)
2000–2001	→ Vicenza (loan)	10	(0)
2001–2006	Roma	0	(0)
2001–2002	→ Palermo (loan)	8	(0)
2002–2003	→ Florentina (loan)	29	(2)
2003–2005	→ Salernitana (loan)	70	(6)
2005–2006	→ Torino (loan)	26	(4)
2006	Genoa	11	(1)
2007–2009	Modena	47	(9)
2010	Benevento	0	(0)

International career
1993–1995	Italy U17	10	(0)
1995	Italy U19	7	(1)
1996–2000	Italy U21	12	(3)

Managerial career
- 2022–2023: Padova (caretaker)
- 2023–2026: Lyon (assistant)
- 2026–: Fiorentina (assistant)
- * Club domestic league appearances and goals

Raffaele Longo (born 6 September 1977) is an Italian football coach and former player who is assistant coach of Serie A club Fiorentina.

== Playing career ==
Longo was born in Naples. A midfielder, he started his career with hometown club Napoli, making his debut in the 1994–95 Serie A season under head coach Vujadin Boškov. He left Napoli for Parma in 1998 and then Vicenza in 2000, and later went on to a career in the minor leagues of professional football.

With the Italy Olympic team, he won the 1997 Mediterranean Games on home soil.

== Coaching career ==
After retiring as a player, Longo took on a coaching career, first as a technical collaborator to Cristiano Bergodi at Modena and Brescia and then as a youth coach at Bari.

In 2019, Longo joined Padova's coaching staff. On 21 February 2022, following the dismissal of head coach Massimo Pavanel, he was appointed caretaker in charge of the first team. After having been in charge for a 1–1 home draw against Legnago, he left his caretaker role on 24 February following the announcement of Massimo Oddo as the new manager.

In October 2023, he sustained injuries from projectiles thrown at the team bus by opposing fans while serving as assistant to Lyon manager Fabio Grosso.
