= Alain Boghossian =

French footballer (born 1970)

Personal information
- Full name: Alain Régis Boghossian
- Date of birth: 27 October 1970 (age 56)
- Place of birth: Digne-les-Bains, Alpes-de-Haute-Provence, France
- Height: 1.85 m (6 ft 1 in)
- Position: Midfielder

Senior career*
Years	Team	Apps	(Gls)
1988–1989	RC Paris	78	(12)
1989–1993	Istres	33	(8)
1993–1994	Marseille	28	(2)
1994–1997	Napoli	54	(4)
1997–1998	Sampdoria	31	(6)
1998–2002	Parma	67	(7)
2002–2003	Espanyol	5	(0)
Total		296	(39)

International career
1997–2002	France	26	(2)

Managerial career
- 2008–2012: France (assistant)
- * Club domestic league appearances and goals

Alain Régis Boghossian (born 27 October 1970) is a French former professional footballer who played as a midfielder. He played for several football clubs in France, Spain and Italy, and represented the France national team 26 times. He has also served as an assistant coach for the France national team.

== Early life and club career ==
Born in Digne-les-Bains, Alpes-de-Haute-Provence, Boghossian began playing football in the reserves of Olympique de Marseille. After a sole season on Marseille in Ligue 1, Boghossian joined Ligue 2 club Istres in order to get match practice. He returned to Marseille after a season in Istres. Boghossian moved to Italy in 1994 and was brought into Serie A club SSC Napoli. He played on Napoli for three years and then played on UC Sampdoria for a season. Boghossian became a member of Parma AC in 1998, where he had his most successful years of his club career. He competed alongside compatriot Lilian Thuram on Parma. Parma won the 1998–99 UEFA Europa League, defeating Marseille 3–1 in the finals. Boghossian scored one goal at the 1998–99 UEFA Cup, the third goal in a 3–1 victory over Fenerbahçe during the second leg. While Boghossian played for Parma, the club went on to win the Italian Supercup in 1999 and the Italian Cup in 1998–99 and 2001–02. He scored the second decisive goal in the 2–1 victory of Parma over Milan in the 1999 Supercoppa Italiana final. Boghossian signed a contract with La Liga club RCD Espanyol in 2002.

Due to several injuries received throughout the year, Boghossian retired as a football player at the end of the season in June 2003.

== International career ==
Boghossian turned down offers to play for the Armenia national football team.

He became an international player for France in 1997, and won the 1998 World Cup with France. He replaced Christian Karembeu in the final against Brazil during the second half. The day before the Euro 2000 started, Boghossian was injured and was forced to miss it. He also appeared at the 2002 World Cup, and in total made 26 international appearances, scoring 2 goals.

== Style of play ==
Boghossian was known for his exceptional stamina as a midfielder.

== Managerial career ==
In July 2008, the French Football Federation appointed Boghossian the assistant coach of the France national team to support head coach Raymond Domenech in the UEFA Euro 2008 qualification matches. He remained in the position when Laurent Blanc became the new manager of the French team.

After the UEFA Euro 2012 and the appointment of Didier Deschamps as manager, Boghossian was not renewed in his position as assistant coach. Fitness trainer Philippe Lambert and doctor Fabrice Bryant also left the staff.

Boghossian is part of the national technical directors of the French Football Federation. He was awarded valedictorian upon getting his DEPF (high professional trainer).

== Personal life ==
Alain was born in Digne-les-Bains, Alpes-de-Haute-Provence to Armenian parents. In 2001, Boghossian and Youri Djorkaeff both thanked the President of the Fifth Republic Jacques Chirac for official recognition of the Armenian genocide by France.

== International goals ==
Scores and results list France's goal tally first, score column indicates score after each Boghossian goal.

List of international goals scored by Alain Boghossian
No.	Date	Venue	Opponent	Score	Result	Competition	Ref.
1	19 August 1998	Ernst-Happel-Stadion, Vienna, Austria	Austria	2–2	2–2	Friendly	
2	10 October 1998	Luzhniki Stadium, Moscow, Russia	Russia	3–2	3–2	UEFA Euro 2000 qualifying	

== Honours ==
Parma

- Coppa Italia: 1998–99, 2001–02
- UEFA Cup: 1998–99
- Supercoppa Italiana: 1999

France

- FIFA World Cup: 1998

Orders

- Knight of the Legion of Honour: 1998
