= Massimo De Santis =

Italian former football referee (born 1962)

Massimo De Santis (born 8 April 1962) is an Italian former association football referee.

== Life and Career ==
De Santis was born in Tivoli, Lazio. In addition to being a former referee, he is also a former police constable. De Santis speaks Italian and English.

His first international game was on 1 January 2000. He officiated the second leg of the 2001 Coppa Italia final, between Parma and Fiorentina. He was an official at the 2004 Summer Olympics in Athens, Greece. He officiated the 2005 Supercoppa Italiana between Juventus and Inter. De Santis was selected as Italy's refereeing representative at the 2006 FIFA World Cup but was barred by the Italian Football Federation due to the Calciopoli scandal in 2006. De Santis strongly denied guilt, saying: "If I committed any offences I did so on the field of play, if mistakes were made – but then we would have to try all the referees in the history of the game. I'm not taking this charge lying down. I expect justice." In July 2006, De Santis was banned for four years from football and given a 23-month prison sentence in November 2011.

On 14 May 2009, the justice of the peace of Lecce acquitted De Santis and managing director Luciano Moggi of the charge of sports fraud and match-fixing related to the Lecce–Juventus and Lecce–Fiorentina matches of the 2004–05 Serie A, as sanctioned by the sporting judgements. In particular, the judge established that "the fact described has not been proven in any way" and that "the Judge also does not consider the sentences rendered by the sports justice bodies fully usable since the latter judgment is structurally different from the ordinary judgement. Nor is it believed that the telephone interceptions referred to in the course of the proceedings can have probative value, since they cannot be used in a proceeding other than the one in which they are ordered." After the March 2015 acquittals of everyone involved in the scandal, De Santis was the only one whose one-year suspended sentence was confirmed, having opted to waive the statute of limitations. He described the Calciopoli trial as "skewed from the start", adding: "I wasn't expecting the prosecution case to hold up. I feel very disappointed. I do not wish this kind of justice on anyone. I reckon that I've been discriminated against. Now I'm waiting to see the sentencing report. I want to understand why I am the only referee still involved in the criminal association."

== Honours ==
- Giovanni Mauro Award for Best Italian International Referee of the Season: 2003
