= Alfredo Trentalange =

Italian football referee

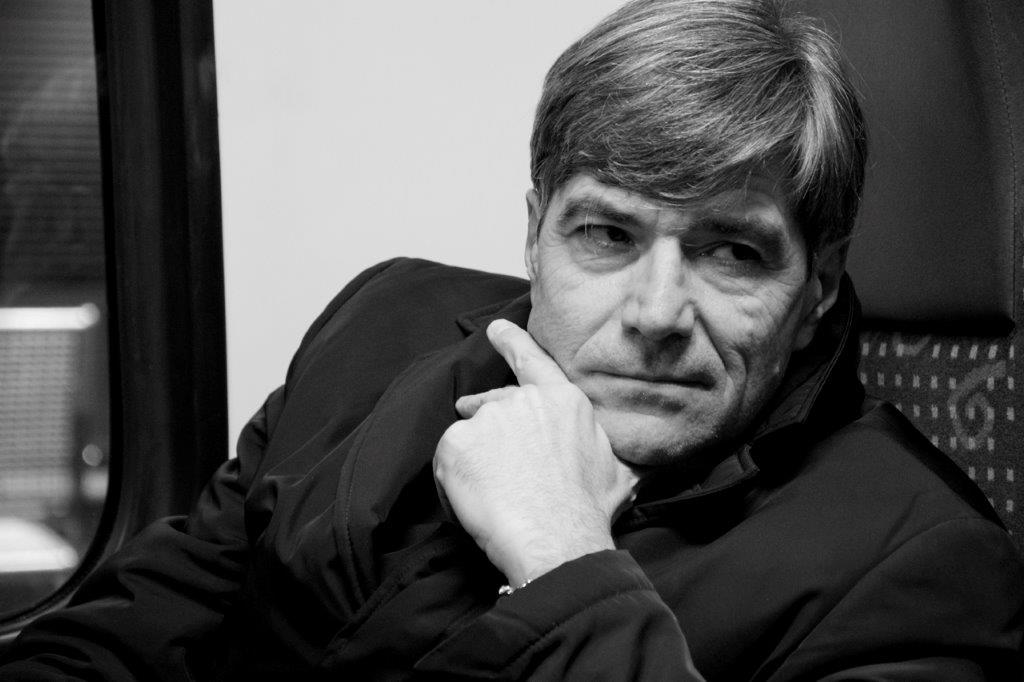
- Born: 9 July 1957 (age 69); Turin, Italy

Domestic
Years	League	Role
1989–2003	Serie A	Referee

International
Years	League	Role
1993–2003	FIFA listed	Referee

Alfredo Trentalange (born 19 July 1957) is an Italian former professional football referee. He was a full international for FIFA from 1993 until 2003.
