= 1995–96 AC Reggiana 1919 season =

AC Reggiana
1995–96 season
- Owner: Franco Dal Cin
- President: Loris Fantinel
- Manager: Carlo Ancelotti
- Stadium: Giglio
- Serie B: 4th (promoted to 1996-97 Serie A)
- Coppa Italia: 3rd round
- Top goalscorer: League: Simutenkov (8); All: Simutenkov (8)
Home colours	Away colours

During the 1995–96 AC Reggiana competed in Serie B and Coppa Italia.

== Summary ==
In his third season as owner, Franco Dal Cin appointed Carlo Ancelotti as the new club manager. Having been assistant to coach Arrigo Sacchi with the Italy national team since 1992, Ancelotti arrived to Reggiana with no previous experience as head coach. He immediately aided the team in achieving promotion to Serie A implementing a rigorous Sacchi-inspired 4–4–2 formation with Marco Ballotta as goalkeeper arrived from Brescia, the crucial playmaker Pietro Strada and Russian forward Igor Simutenkov who scored eight goals during the campaign.

== Squad ==
- .- Source: http://calcio-seriea.net/rose/1995/2805/

Note: Flags indicate national team as defined under FIFA eligibility rules; some limited exceptions apply. Players may hold more than one non-FIFA nationality.

No.	Pos.	Nation	Player
1	GK	ITA	Ettore Gandini
2	DF	ITA	Roberto Cevoli
3	DF	ITA	Giordano Caini
4	MF	ITA	Alessandro Mazzola
5	DF	ITA	Eugenio Sgarbossa
6	DF	ITA	Angelo Gregucci
7	MF	ITA	Marco Schenardi
8	MF	ITA	Carmelo La Spada
9	FW	ITA	Roberto Paci
10	MF	ITA	Pietro Strada
11	FW	RUS	Igor Simutenkov

No.	Pos.	Nation	Player
14	FW	ITA	Michele Pietranera
15	DF	ITA	Max Tonetto
16	DF	ITA	Giovanni Orfei
18	FW	ITA	Marco Di Costanzo
19	DF	ITA	Massimiliano Tangorra
20	MF	ITA	Leonardo Colucci
21	DF	ITA	Paolo Ziliani
22	GK	ITA	Marco Ballotta
23	FW	ITA	Adriano Alex Taribello
24	MF	ITA	Fabrizio Di Mauro
27	FW	ITA	Antonio Rizzolo
28	MF	ITA	Fernando De Napoli

=== Transfers ===
In
Pos.	Name	from	Type
GK	Marco Ballotta	Brescia	
MF	Pietro Strada	Salernitana	
MF	Leonardo Colucci	SS Lazio	
DF	Paolo Ziliani	Cosenza	
MF	Fabrizio Di Mauro	Fiorentina	
DF	Massimiliano Tangorra	Ancona	
MF	Marco Schenardi	Brescia	
DF	Giordano Caini	Foggia	
FW	Roberto Paci	Lucchese	

Out
Pos.	Name	To	Type
FW	Paulo Futre	AC Milan	
GK	Francesco Antonioli	Bologna	
MF	Sunday Oliseh	1. FC Köln	
MF	Fernando De Napoli	Cagliari	
MF	Massimiliano Esposito	SS Lazio	
MF	Massimo Brambilla	Parma	
DF	Enzo Gambaro	Fiorentina	
DF	Luigi De Agostini		retired
GK	Andrea Sardini	Cesena	
DF	Michele Zanutta	Venezia	
FW	Rui Aguas		released
FW	Nunzio Falco	AC Prato	
DF	Gianfranco Parlato	Pescara	

==== Winter ====
In
Pos.	Name	from	Type
FW	Antonio Rizzolo	Palermo	
MF	Fernando De Napoli	Cagliari	

Out
Pos.	Name	To	Type
FW	Roberto Paci	Lucchese	

=== Serie B ===
==== League table ====
Pos	Team	Pld	W	D	L	GF	GA	GD	Pts	Promotion or relegation
2	Hellas Verona (P)	38	17	12	9	50	33	+17	63	Promotion to Serie A
3	Perugia (P)	38	16	13	9	52	42	+10	61	Promotion to Serie A
4	Reggiana (P)	38	16	13	9	42	32	+10	61	Promotion to Serie A
5	Salernitana	38	15	13	10	46	32	+14	58	
6	Lucchese	38	13	15	10	45	43	+2	54	

Source: Almanacco Illustrato del Calcio - La Storia 1898-2004, Panini Edizioni, Modena, September 2005
Rules for classification: 1) points; 2) head-to-head points; 3) head-to-head goal difference; 4) head-to-head goals scored; 5) goal difference; 6) number of goals scored.
(P) Promoted

==== Results by round ====
Round	1	2	3	4	5	6	7	8	9	10	11	12	13	14	15	16	17	18	19	20	21	22	23	24	25	26	27	28	29	30	31	32	33	34	35	36	37	38
Ground	H	A	H	A	A	H	A	H	A	H	A	H	A	H	A	H	A	H	A	A	H	A	H	H	A	H	A	H	A	H	A	H	A	H	A	H	A	H
Result	D	L	D	L	D	D	L	W	D	W	W	W	L	W	W	D	L	W	W	D	W	L	D	D	W	W	D	W	L	W	D	W	D	W	D	W	W	L
Position	7	13	15	20	18	19	20	16	17	13	10	10	10	8	4	4	5	4	6	7	3	7	6	6	4	2	3	2	3	3	4	3	3	2	3	3	3	4

Source: http://calcio-seriea.net/allenatori_squadra/1995/2805/
A = Away; H = Home; W = Win; D = Draw; L = Loss; = Leader, 1996-97 Serie A; = 1996–97 Serie A; = Relegation to 1996–97 Serie C1

==== Matches ====
- .-Source:http://calcio-seriea.net/partite/1995/2805/

27 August 1995 1	Reggiana	0 – 0	Palermo	Reggio Emilia
		Report		Stadium: Giglio; Referee: Bonfrisco

3 September 1995 2	Pistoiese	2 – 0	Reggiana	Pistoia
	Montrone 46', 83'	Report		Stadium: Comunale; Referee: De Prisco

10 September 1995 3	Reggiana	0 – 0	Perugia	Reggio Emilia
		Report		Stadium: Giglio; Referee: Ceccarini

17 September 1995 4	Cosenza	3 – 1	Reggiana	Cosenza
	Buonocore 52' (pen.), 75' Marulla Miceli 90'	Report	68' (pen.) Simutenkov	Stadium: San Vito; Referee: Bettin

24 September 1995 5	Genoa	1 – 1	Reggiana	Genoa
	Torrente 15'	Report	76' Paci	Stadium: Luigi Ferraris; Referee: Franceschini

1 October 1995 6	Reggiana	1 – 1	Lucchese	Reggio Emilia
	Strada 18'	Report	61' Rastelli	Stadium: Giglio; Referee: Lana

8 October 1995 7	Pescara	4 – 1	Reggiana	Pescara
	A. Carnevale 40'; Sullo 47'; Giampaolo 59', 70'	Report	11' Paci	Stadium: Adriatico; Referee: Cesari

15 October 1995 8	Reggiana	3 – 0	Venezia	Reggio Emilia
	Strada 8', 15'; Paci 29' (pen.)	Report		Stadium: Giglio; Referee: De Santis

22 October 1995 9	Cesena	1 – 1	Reggiana	Cesena
	Hubner 25'	Report	68' Cevoli	Stadium: Dino Manuzzi; Referee: Dagnello

29 October 1995 10	Reggiana	2 – 1	Salernitana	Reggio Emilia
	Strada 28'; Ziliani 40'	Report	15' Iuliano	Stadium: Giglio; Referee: Serena

5 November 1995 11	Avellino	0 – 3	Reggiana	Avellino
		Report	50', 51' Pietranera; 56' Simutenkov	Stadium: Partenio; Referee: Tombolini (Ancona)

12 November 1995 12	Reggiana	1 – 0	Bologna	Reggio Emilia
	Strada 13'	Report		Stadium: Giglio; Referee: Messina

26 November 1995 13	Foggia	3 – 0	Reggiana	Benevento
	Cevoli 27' (o.g.); P. Bresciani 42', 58'	Report		Stadium: Santa Colomba; Referee: Bonfrisco

3 December 1995 14	Reggiana	1 – 0	Chievo Verona	Reggio Emilia
	Tangorra 78'	Report		Stadium: Giglio; Referee: Ercolino

10 December 1995 15	Brescia	0 – 1	Reggiana	Brescia
		Report	85' Pietranera	Stadium: Mario Rigamonti; Referee: Farina

17 December 1995 16	Reggiana	0 – 0	Fidelis Andria	Reggio Emilia
		Report		Stadium: Giglio; Referee: Stafoggia

23 December 1995 17	Ancona	1 – 0	Reggiana	Ancona
	Artistico 41'	Report		Stadium: Stadio Del Conero; Referee: Borriello

7 January 1996 18	Reggiana	2 – 0	Hellas Verona	Reggio Emilia
	Simutenkov 1', 87'	Report		Stadium: Giglio; Referee: Racalbuto

14 January 1996 19	Reggina	2 – 0	Reggiana	Reggio Calabria
	Ceramicola 36'; Pasino 73' (pen.)	Report		Stadium: Comunale; Referee: Lana

21 January 1996 20	Palermo	0 – 0	Reggiana	Palermo
		Report		Stadium: La Favorita; Referee: Ceccarini

28 January 1996 21	Reggiana	2 – 0	Pistoiese	Reggio Emilia
	Notari 57' (o.g.); Simutenkov 87'	Report		Stadium: Giglio; Referee: Dagnello

4 February 1996 22	Perugia	2 – 1	Reggiana	Perugia
	Negri 19'; A. Briaschi 34'	Report	77' Pietranera	Stadium: Renato Curi; Referee: Boggi

18 February 1996 23	Reggiana	1 – 1	Cosenza	Reggio Emilia
	Colucci 69'	Report	90' Lucarelli	Stadium: Giglio; Referee: Quartuccio

25 February 1996 24	Reggiana	0 – 0	Genoa	Reggio Emilia
		Report		Stadium: Giglio; Referee: Rodomonti

3 March 1996 25	Lucchese	0 – 2	Reggiana	Lucca
		Report	45', 50' Simutenkov	Stadium: Porta Elisa; Referee: Cinciripini

10 March 1996 26	Reggiana	3 – 1	Pescara	Reggio Emilia
	Rizzolo 41', 55'; Di Costanzo 90'	Report	63' Di Giannatale	Stadium: Giglio; Referee: Bettin

24 March 1996 27	Venezia	0 – 0	Reggiana	Venice
		Report		Stadium: Pierluigi Penzo; Referee: Messina

31 March 1996 28	Reggiana	1 – 0	Cesena	Reggio Emilia
	Corrado 21' (o.g.)	Report		Stadium: Giglio; Referee: Nicchi

6 April 1996 29	Salernitana	1 – 0	Reggiana	Salerno
	Pisano 87'	Report		Stadium: Arechi; Referee: Pairetto

14 April 1996 30	Reggiana	1 – 0	Avellino	Reggio Emilia
	Colucci 70'	Report		Stadium: Giglio; Referee: Gronda (Genova)

20 April 1996 31	Bologna	0 – 0	Reggiana	Bologna
		Report		Stadium: Renato Dall'Ara; Referee: Ceccarini

28 April 1996 32	Reggiana	5 – 1	Foggia	Reggio Emilia
	Rizzolo 20'; Strada 34' (pen.), 64'; Schenardi 36', 57'	Report	66' Kolyvanov	Stadium: Giglio; Referee: De Prisco

5 May 1996 33	Chievo Verona	0 – 0	Reggiana	Verona
		Report		Stadium: Marcantonio Bentegodi; Referee: Treossi

12 May 1996 34	Reggiana	3 – 2	Brescia	Reggio Emilia
	Simutenkov 4', 53' (pen.); Gregucci 23'	Report	2' A. Filippini; 32' Volpi	Stadium: Giglio; Referee: Trentalange

19 May 1996 35	Fidelis Andria	1 – 1	Reggiana	Andria
	Gasparini 1'	Report	78' Colucci	Stadium: degli Ulivi; Referee: Pellegrino

26 May 1996 36	Reggiana	2 – 1	Ancona	Reggio Emilia
	Pietranera 20'; Schenardi 61'	Report	21' Lucidi	Stadium: Giglio; Referee: Borriello

2 June 1996 37	Hellas Verona	0 – 1	Reggiana	Verona
		Report	77' Strada	Stadium: Marcantonio Bentegodi; Referee: Tombolini

9 June 1996 38	Reggiana	1 – 3	Reggina	Reggio Emilia
	Schenardi 28'	Report	8' Toscano; 19', 37' Aglietti	Stadium: Giglio; Referee: Bazzoli

=== Coppa Italia ===
20 August 1995 1	Trapani	1 – 1(d.t.s.) (5 – 6 p)	Reggiana	Stadio Polisportivo Provinciale
	Di Pietro 38'		64' La Spada	Referee: Rossi (Ciampino)
	Penalties
	Marta De Sio (penalty missed); Scichilone; Incrivaglia; Campioli; Italiano Campanella (penalty missed)		Ziliani Mazzola; Schenardi; (penalty missed) Pietranera; Simutenkov; Ballotta Sgarbossa

30 August 1995 2	Reggiana	2 – 0	Bari	Reggio Emilia
	Schenardi 39'; Paci 34'			Stadium: Giglio; Referee: Rodomonti

26 October 1995 3	Bologna	3 – 0	Reggiana	Bologna
	G. Bresciani 18', 56' (pen.); Valtolina 48'			Stadium: Renato Dall'Ara; Referee: Pairetto

== Statistics ==
=== Players statistics ===
No.	Pos	Nat	Player	Total		1995-96 Serie B	
No.	Pos	Nat	Player	Apps	Goals	Apps	Goals
22	GK	(Italy) ITA	Marco Ballotta	38	-32	38	-32
2	DF	(Italy) ITA	Roberto Cevoli	35	1	32+3	1
19	DF	(Italy) ITA	Massimiliano Tangorra	36	1	34+2	1
3	DF	(Italy) ITA	Giordano Caini	25	0	25	0
6	DF	(Italy) ITA	Angelo Gregucci	29	1	29	1
7	MF	(Italy) ITA	Marco Schenardi	36	4	36	4
20	MF	(Italy) ITA	Leonardo Colucci	35	3	25+10	3
4	MF	(Italy) ITA	Alessandro Mazzola	30	1	28+2	1
10	MF	(Italy) ITA	Pietro Strada	30	8	29+1	8
11	FW	(Russia) RUS	Igor Simutenkov	33	8	33	8
14	FW	(Italy) ITA	Michele Pietranera	25	5	16+9	5
1	GK	(Italy) ITA	Ettore Gandini	0	0	0	0
5	DF	(Italy) ITA	Eugenio Sgarbossa	24	0	15+9	0
21	DF	(Italy) ITA	Paolo Ziliani	21	1	14+7	1
16	DF	(Italy) ITA	Giovanni Orfei	21	0	14+7	0
24	MF	(Italy) ITA	Fabrizio Di Mauro	16	0	12+4	0
27	FW	(Italy) ITA	Antonio Rizzolo	13	3	12+1	3
15	DF	(Italy) ITA	Max Tonetto	17	0	10+7	0
9	FW	(Italy) ITA	Roberto Paci	10	3	8+2	3
8	MF	(Italy) ITA	Carmelo La Spada	14	0	4+10	0
18	FW	(Italy) ITA	Marco Di Costanzo	15	1	3+12	1
28	MF	(Italy) ITA	Fernando De Napoli	5	0	1+4	0
23	FW	(Italy) ITA	Adriano Alex Taribello	4	0	0+4	0
	DF	(Italy) ITA	Paolo Mozzini	0	0	0	0
	MF	(Italy) ITA	Fabio Mencuccini	0	0	0	0
	GK	(Italy) ITA	Stefano Pardini	0	0	0	0

- Source: http://calcio-seriea.net/presenze/1995/2805/

== Sources ==
- RSSSF - Italy 1995/96
