= 1997–98 Parma AC season =

Parma
1997–98 season
- Owner: Parmalat
- President: Calisto Tanzi
- Manager: Carlo Ancelotti
- Stadium: Stadio Ennio Tardini
- Serie A: 6th
- Coppa Italia: Semi-finals
- UEFA Champions League: Group stage
- Top goalscorer: League: Hernán Crespo (12); All: Enrico Chiesa (21)
Home colours	Away colours

During the 1997–98 season, the club's eighth in Serie A, Parma Associazione Calcio competed in Serie A, the Coppa Italia, and the UEFA Champions League.

== Season review ==
The team had another good season, finishing 6th in the league and thus qualifying for the 1998–99 UEFA Cup, as well as reaching the semi-finals of the Coppa Italia. The team's solitary disappointment was a group stage exit in their first-ever appearance in the UEFA Champions League.

== Players ==
=== Squad information ===
Squad at end of season

Note: Flags indicate national team as defined under FIFA eligibility rules; some limited exceptions apply. Players may hold more than one non-FIFA nationality.

No.	Pos.	Nation	Player
1	GK	ITA	Gianluigi Buffon
2	DF	BRA	Zé Maria
3	DF	ITA	Antonio Benarrivo
4	MF	ITA	Stefano Fiore
7	DF	ARG	Roberto Sensini
8	MF	ITA	Dino Baggio
9	MF	ITA	Massimo Crippa
10	MF	ITA	Pietro Strada
11	FW	ARG	Hernán Crespo
12	GK	ITA	Matteo Guardalben
13	MF	CRO	Mario Stanić
14	DF	ITA	Roberto Mussi
15	MF	FRA	Reynald Pedros
16	DF	ITA	Luigi Apolloni

No.	Pos.	Nation	Player
17	DF	ITA	Fabio Cannavaro
18	MF	ITA	Federico Giunti
19	MF	ITA	Pierluigi Orlandini
20	FW	ITA	Enrico Chiesa
21	DF	FRA	Lilian Thuram
23	GK	ITA	Alessandro Nista
25	FW	BRA	Adaílton
26	MF	ITA	Simone Barone
28	MF	SWE	Jesper Blomqvist
29	DF	ITA	Edric Tiozzo
30	DF	ITA	Nicola Mora
31	FW	COL	Faustino Asprilla
32	DF	ITA	Antonio Calabro
33	MF	ITA	Matteo Apolloni

=== Transfers ===
In
Pos.	Name	from	Type
MF	Jesper Blomqvist	AC Milan	U$9,0 million
MF	Adaílton	Juventude	-
MF	Stefano Fiore	Padova Calcio	
GK	Matteo Guardalben	Hellas Verona	-
MF	Federico Giunti	Perugia Calcio	
MF	Pierluigi Orlandini	Internazionale	
DF	Mauro Milanese	SSC Napoli	
FW	Filippo Maniero	Hellas Verona	

Out
Pos.	Name	To	Type
FW	Alessandro Melli	Perugia Calcio	
MF	Daniel Bravo	Olympique Lyonnais	
MF	Reynald Pedros	SSC Napoli	
MF	Amaral	Benfica	loan

==== Winter ====
In
Pos.	Name	from	Type
FW	Faustino Asprilla	Newcastle United	

Out
Pos.	Name	To	Type
DF	Mauro Milanese	Inter Milan	
FW	Filippo Maniero	AC Milan	
DF	Ivan Franceschini	Salernitana	

== Competitions ==
=== Serie A ===
==== League table ====
Pos	Team	Pld	W	D	L	GF	GA	GD	Pts	Qualification or relegation
4	Roma	34	16	11	7	67	42	+25	59	Qualification to UEFA Cup
5	Fiorentina	34	15	12	7	65	36	+29	57 (Note: Fiorentina finished ahead of Parma on head-to-head points: FIO 1–1 PAR; PAR 1–2 FIO.)	Qualification to UEFA Cup
6	Parma	34	15	12	7	55	39	+16	57	Qualification to UEFA Cup
7	Lazio	34	16	8	10	53	30	+23	56	Qualification to Cup Winners' Cup
8	Bologna	34	12	12	10	55	46	+9	48 (Note: Bologna finished ahead of Sampdoria on head-to-head points: BOL 2–2 SAM; SAM 2–3 BOL.)	Qualification to Intertoto Cup third round

Source: 1997–98 Serie A, RSSSF.com, Soccerway
Rules for classification: 1) Points; 2) Head-to-head points; 3) Head-to-head goal difference; 4) Goal difference; 5) Goals scored; 6) Draw. (Note: Head-to-head record is used only after all the matches between the teams in question have been played).

==== Results summary ====
Overall								Home						Away					
Pld	W	D	L	GF	GA	GD	Pts	W	D	L	GF	GA	GD	W	D	L	GF	GA	GD
34	15	12	7	55	39	+16	57	9	5	3	30	19	+11	6	7	4	25	20	+5

Last updated: 16 May 1998.
Source: Competitive matches

==== Results by round ====
Round	1	2	3	4	5	6	7	8	9	10	11	12	13	14	15	16	17	18	19	20	21	22	23	24	25	26	27	28	29	30	31	32	33	34
Ground	A	H	A	H	A	H	A	H	A	H	A	A	H	H	A	H	A	H	A	H	A	H	A	H	A	H	A	H	H	A	A	H	A	H
Result	W	D	W	W	D	W	L	W	D	L	D	W	W	D	L	W	L	W	D	D	D	W	W	W	L	D	D	L	W	W	W	D	D	L
Position	1	3	2	2	2	2	3	3	3	5	5	4	4	4	4	4	5	4	5	5	5	5	5	4	5	5	5	7	5	4	4	4	4	6

Source: Competitive matches
A = Away; H = Home; W = Win; D = Draw; L = Loss; P = Postponed; = Leader, 1998–99 UEFA Champions League Group stage; = 1998–99 UEFA Champions League Second Qualifying round; = 1998–99 UEFA Cup First round; = Qualification to Intertoto Cup; = 1998–99 Serie B

==== Matches ====
31 August 1997 1	Bari	0–2	Parma	Bari
		Report	Strada 43'; Benarrivo 71'	Stadium: Stadio San Nicola; Referee: Pierluigi Collina

14 September 1997 2	Parma	2–2	Atalanta	Parma
	Maniero 30'; Strada 36'	Report	Lucarelli 20', 62'	Stadium: Stadio Ennio Tardini; Referee: Robert Anthony Boggi

21 September 1997 3	Piacenza	1–3	Parma	Piacenza
	Scienza 45'	Report	Crespo 1', 63'; Sensini 29'	Stadium: Stadio Leonardo Garilli; Referee: Alfredo Trentalange

27 September 1997 4	Parma	4–0	Udinese	Parma
	Crespo 32'; Sensini 83'; Maniero 86'; Strada 89' (pen.)	Report		Stadium: Stadio Ennio Tardini; Referee: Pierluigi Pairetto

5 October 1997 5	Vicenza	0–0	Parma	Vicenza
		Report		Stadium: Stadio Romeo Menti; Referee: Pasquale Rodomonti

19 October 1997 6	Parma	2–0	Bologna	Parma
	Chiesa 36'; D. Baggio 47'	Report		Stadium: Stadio Ennio Tardini; Referee: Domenico Messina

1 November 1997 7	Internazionale	1–0	Parma	Milan
	Ronaldo 15'	Report		Stadium: San Siro; Referee: Piero Ceccarini

9 November 1997 8	Parma	2–0	Empoli	Parma
	Adaílton 74'; Sensini 85' (pen.)	Report		Stadium: Stadio Ennio Tardini; Referee: Roberto Bettin

23 November 1997 9	Juventus	2–2	Parma	Turin
	Del Piero 43'; Amoruso 82'	Report	Chiesa 34'; Crespo 45'	Stadium: Stadio delle Alpi; Referee: Fiorenzo Treossi

30 November 1997 10	Parma	0–2	Roma	Parma
		Report	Totti 9'; Paulo Sérgio 22'	Stadium: Stadio Ennio Tardini; Referee: Stefano Braschi

7 December 1997 11	Fiorentina	1–1	Parma	Florence
	Morfeo 58'	Report	Apolloni 54'	Stadium: Stadio Artemio Franchi; Referee: Pierluigi Pairetto

14 December 1997 12	Napoli	0–4	Parma	Naples
		Report	Blomqvist 18'; D. Baggio 53'; Crespo 65', 73'	Stadium: Stadio San Paolo; Referee: Livio Bazzoli

21 December 1997 13	Parma	2–1	Lecce	Parma
	D. Baggio 55'; Chiesa 62'	Report	Rossi 71'	Stadium: Stadio Ennio Tardini; Referee: Daniele Tombolini

4 January 1998 14	Parma	1–1	Lazio	Parma
	Chiesa 55' (pen.)	Report	Bokšić 19'	Stadium: Stadio Ennio Tardini; Referee: Roberto Bettin

11 January 1998 15	Sampdoria	5–2	Parma	Genoa
	Montella 5'; Signori 26', 83'; Vergassola 33'; Thuram 49' (o.g.)	Report	Maniero 54', 58'	Stadium: Stadio Luigi Ferraris; Referee: Pasquale Rodomonti

18 January 1998 16	Parma	3–1	AC Milan	Parma
	Chiesa 33', 75'; D. Baggio 44'	Report	Ganz 70'	Stadium: Stadio Ennio Tardini; Referee: Piero Ceccarini

25 January 1998 17	Brescia	2–1	Parma	Brescia
	Hübner 15', 60' (pen.)	Report	Fiore 43'	Stadium: Stadio Mario Rigamonti; Referee: Stefano Braschi

1 February 1998 18	Parma	1–0	Bari	Parma
	D. Baggio 68'	Report		Stadium: Stadio Ennio Tardini; Referee: Salvatore Racalbuto

8 February 1998 19	Atalanta	0–0	Parma	Bergamo
		Report		Stadium: Stadio Atleti Azzurri d'Italia; Referee: Fiorenzo Treossi

11 February 1998 20	Parma	1–1	Piacenza	Parma
	Crespo 13' (pen.)	Report	Buso 28'	Stadium: Stadio Ennio Tardini; Referee: Massimo De Santis

15 February 1998 21	Udinese	1–1	Parma	Udine
	Bierhoff 80'	Report	Crespo 33'	Stadium: Stadio Friuli; Referee: Stefano Farina

22 February 1998 22	Parma	2–1	Vicenza	Parma
	Stanić 63'; Chiesa 72' (pen.)	Report	Ambrosetti 59'	Stadium: Stadio Ennio Tardini; Referee: Emilio Pellegrino

1 March 1998 23	Bologna	1–2	Parma	Bologna
	Paramatti 11'	Report	Stanić 15'; Crippa 28'	Stadium: Stadio Renato Dall'Ara; Referee: Cosimo Bolognino

8 March 1998 24	Parma	1–0	Internazionale	Parma
	Crespo 78'	Report		Stadium: Stadio Ennio Tardini; Referee: Pasquale Rodomonti

15 March 1998 25	Empoli	2–0	Parma	Empoli
	Martusciello 26'; Bonomi 45+3'	Report		Stadium: Stadio Carlo Castellani; Referee: Livio Bazzoli

22 March 1998 26	Parma	2–2	Juventus	Parma
	Stanić 36'; Crippa 40'	Report	Tacchinardi 55'; Inzaghi 60'	Stadium: Stadio Ennio Tardini; Referee: Robert Anthony Boggi

29 March 1998 27	Roma	2–2	Parma	Rome
	Totti 10'; Paulo Sérgio 25'	Report	Chiesa 26', 53'	Stadium: Stadio Olimpico; Referee: Gennaro Borriello

5 April 1998 28	Parma	1–2	Fiorentina	Parma
	Crespo 58'	Report	Edmundo 54'; Rui Costa 77'	Stadium: Stadio Ennio Tardini; Referee: Cosimo Bolognino

11 April 1998 29	Parma	3–1	Napoli	Parma
	Crespo 3', 86'; Apolloni 76'	Report	Bellucci 69'	Stadium: Stadio Ennio Tardini; Referee: Diego Preschern

19 April 1998 30	Lecce	0–2	Parma	Lecce
		Report	Casale 39' (o.g.); Adaílton 90'	Stadium: Stadio Via del Mare; Referee: Pierluigi Collina

26 April 1998 31	Lazio	1–2	Parma	Rome
	Nedvěd 57'	Report	Sensini 71'; Stanić 74'	Stadium: Stadio Olimpico; Referee: Pierluigi Pairetto

3 May 1998 32	Parma	2–2	Sampdoria	Parma
	Chiesa 35'; Sensini 79'	Report	Soares 66'; Boghossian 87'	Stadium: Stadio Ennio Tardini; Referee: Pierpaolo Rossi

10 May 1998 33	AC Milan	1–1	Parma	Milan
	Weah 56'	Report	André Cruz 16' (o.g.)	Stadium: San Siro; Referee: Domenico Messina

16 May 1998 34	Parma	1–3	Brescia	Parma
	De Paola 5' (o.g.)	Report	Bizzarri 33', 44'; Neri 72' (pen.)	Stadium: Stadio Ennio Tardini; Referee: Graziano Cesari

=== Coppa Italia ===
==== Second round ====
3 September 1997 1	Venezia	3–2	Parma	Venice
	Ballarin 19'; Antonioli 23'; Polesel 48' (pen.)		Maniero 57'; Milanese 67'	Stadium: Stadio Pier Luigi Penzo; Attendance: 8,636; Referee: Alfredo Trentalange

24 September 1997 2	Parma	3–1 (5–4 agg.)	Venezia	Parma
	Chiesa 26', 34'; Pavan 45' (o.g.)		Marangon 62'	Stadium: Stadio Ennio Tardini; Referee: Cosimo Bolognino

==== Round of 16 ====
15 October 1997 1	Parma	2–1	Bari	Parma
	Adaílton 36'; Fiore 45'		Zambrotta 60'	Stadium: Stadio Ennio Tardini; Referee: Emilio Pellegrino

19 November 1997 2	Bari	0–1 (1–3 agg.)	Parma	Bari
			Maniero 87'	Stadium: Stadio San Nicola; Referee: Domenico Messina

==== Quarter-finals ====
7 January 1998 1	Parma	1–0	Atalanta	Parma
20:30 CET (UTC+01:00)	Chiesa 37'			Stadium: Stadio Ennio Tardini; Attendance: 4,453; Referee: Salvatore Racalbuto

21 January 1998 2	Atalanta	1–1 (1–2 agg.)	Parma	Bergamo
20:30 CET (UTC+01:00)	Bonacina 77'		Chiesa 56'	Stadium: Stadio Atleti Azzurri d'Italia; Attendance: 14,000; Referee: Emilio Pellegrino

==== Semi-finals ====
18 February 1998 1	AC Milan	0–0	Parma	Milan
				Stadium: San Siro; Referee: Stefano Braschi

12 March 1998 2	Parma	2–2 (2–2a agg.)	AC Milan	Parma
	Chiesa 49'; Stanić 85'		45', 90+3' Kluivert	Stadium: Il Tardini; Referee: Pierluigi Pairetto

=== UEFA Champions League ===
==== Second qualifying round ====
13 August 1997 First leg	Widzew Łódź (Poland)	1–3	(Italy) Parma	Łódź, Poland
20:30 CEST (UTC+02:00)	Mikhalchuk 52'; Gęsior (yellow card) 68'	Report	Benarrivo (yellow card) 6'; Chiesa 27', 47', 49'; Crespo (yellow card) 60'	Stadium: Stadion Widzewa; Referee: Marc Batta (France)

27 August 1997 Second leg	Parma (Italy)	4–0 (7–1 agg.)	(Poland) Widzew Łódź	Parma, Italy
21:00 CEST (UTC+02:00)	Pedros 36'; Sensini 41', 52', (yellow card) 46'; Adaílton 78'	Report		Stadium: Stadio Ennio Tardini; Referee: Hugh Dallas (Scotland)

==== Group stage ====
Pos	Team	Pld	W	D	L	GF	GA	GD	Pts	Qualification
1	(Germany) Borussia Dortmund	6	5	0	1	14	3	+11	15	Advance to knockout stage
2	(Italy) Parma	6	2	3	1	6	5	+1	9	
3	(Czech Republic) Sparta Prague	6	1	2	3	6	11	−5	5	
4	(Turkey) Galatasaray	6	1	1	4	4	11	−7	4	

Source: UEFA

17 September 1997 1	Sparta Prague (Czech Republic)	0–0	(Italy) Parma	Prague, Czech Republic
20:45 CEST (UTC+02:00)	Svoboda (yellow card) 40'; Řepka (yellow card) 54'; Hašek (yellow card) 63'; Němeček (yellow card) 82'; Baranek (yellow card) 85'	Report	Chiesa (yellow card) 27'; Thuram (yellow card) 30'; Crippa (yellow card) 36'; Benarrivo (yellow card) 41'; Cannavaro (yellow card) 77'	Stadium: Stadion Letná; Attendance: 17,846; Referee: Dick Jol (Netherlands)

1 October 1997 2	Parma (Italy)	2–0	(Turkey) Galatasaray	Parma, Italy
20:45 CEST (UTC+02:00)	Sensini 24'; Crespo 30'	Report	Okan (yellow card) 83'	Stadium: Stadio Ennio Tardini; Attendance: 15,922; Referee: Serge Muhmenthaler (Switzerland)

22 October 1997 3	Parma (Italy)	1–0	(Germany) Borussia Dortmund	Parma, Italy
20:45 CEST (UTC+02:00)	Crespo 62'; Stanić (yellow card) 89'	Report	Reuter (yellow card) 21'; Sousa (yellow card) 43'; Chapuisat (yellow card) 65'	Stadium: Stadio Ennio Tardini; Attendance: 13,449; Referee: Gilles Veissière (France)

5 November 1997 4	Borussia Dortmund (Germany)	2–0	(Italy) Parma	Dortmund, Germany
20:45 CET (UTC+01:00)	Möller 50', 75'	Report	D. Baggio (yellow card) 37'; Mussi (yellow card) 45'; Crippa (yellow card) 79'	Stadium: Westfalenstadion; Attendance: 40,000; Referee: Kim Milton Nielsen (Denmark)

27 November 1997 5	Parma (Italy)	2–2	(Czech Republic) Sparta Prague	Parma, Italy
20:45 CET (UTC+01:00)	Chiesa 22', 90' (pen.)	Report	Horňák (yellow card) 21'; Řepka (yellow card) 72'; Siegl (yellow card) 78'; Novotný 87'; Obajdin 89'	Stadium: Stadio Ennio Tardini; Attendance: 16,200; Referee: Leif Sundell (Sweden)

10 December 1997 6	Galatasaray (Turkey)	1–1	(Italy) Parma	Istanbul, Turkey
20:45 CET (UTC+01:00)	Hagi (yellow card) 34'; Ilie 52'; Tugay (yellow card) 54'	Report	Fiore (yellow card) 20'; Thuram (yellow card) 30'; Chiesa 47'	Stadium: Ali Sami Yen Stadium; Attendance: 14,000; Referee: László Vágner (Hungary)

== Statistics ==
=== Players statistics ===
No.	Pos	Nat	Player	Total		Serie A		Champions League		Coppa	
No.	Pos	Nat	Player	Apps	Goals	Apps	Goals	Apps	Goals	Apps	Goals
1	GK	(Italy) ITA	Buffon	46	-46	32	-33	8	-6	6	-7
21	DF	(France) FRA	Thuram	46	0	32	0	8	0	6	0
17	DF	(Italy) ITA	Cannavaro	44	0	31	0	7	0	6	0
7	DF	(Argentina) ARG	Sensini	33	8	23+1	5	6	3	3	0
3	DF	(Italy) ITA	Benarrivo	35	1	23+1	1	5	0	6	0
13	MF	(Croatia) CRO	Stanic	32	5	20+3	4	3+1	0	5	1
8	MF	(Italy) ITA	Dino Baggio	43	5	29	5	8	0	6	0
9	MF	(Italy) ITA	Crippa	38	2	18+8	2	6+1	0	5	0
28	MF	(Sweden) SWE	Blomqvist	31	1	24+4	1	0	0	3	0
11	FW	(Argentina) ARG	Crespo	35	14	22+3	12	7+1	2	2	0
20	FW	(Italy) ITA	Chiesa	48	21	33	10	8	6	7	5
12	GK	(Italy) ITA	Guardalben	4	-5	2	-4	0	0	2	-1
2	DF	(Brazil) BRA	Zé Maria	31	0	18+2	0	6	0	5	0
14	DF	(Italy) ITA	Mussi	31	0	14+6	0	2+3	0	6	0
4	MF	(Italy) ITA	Fiore	39	2	13+13	1	2+4	0	7	1
16	DF	(Italy) ITA	Apolloni	19	2	10+4	2	1	0	4	0
18	MF	(Italy) ITA	Giunti	15	0	7+6	0	1	0	1	0
10	MF	(Italy) ITA	Strada	16	3	5+4	3	1+4	0	2	0
6	DF	(Italy) ITA	Milanese	14	1	5+1	0	1+3	0	4	1
25	FW	(Brazil) BRA	Adaílton	21	4	4+9	2	0+2	1	6	1
19	MF	(Italy) ITA	Orlandoni	21	0	4+9	0	0+2	0	6	0
22	FW	(Italy) ITA	Maniero	21	6	2+8	4	5+1	0	5	2
31	FW	(Colombia) COL	Asprilla	4	0	2+2	0				
30	DF	(Italy) ITA	Mora	3	0	1+2	0				
23	GK	(Italy) ITA	Nista	2	-2	0+1	-2	0	0	1	0
15	MF	(France) FRA	Pedros	4	1	0+1	0	0+2	1	1	0
26	MF	(Italy) ITA	Barone	0	0	0	0				
29	DF	(Italy) ITA	Tiozzo	0	0	0	0				
23	FW	(Italy) ITA	Melli	1	0	0	0	0	0	1	0
5	MF	(France) FRA	Daniel Bravo	1	0	0	0	0	0	1	0
32	DF	(Italy) ITA	Calabro								
33	MF	(Italy) ITA	Apolloni								

- Source: http://calcio-seriea.net/presenze/1997/1127/
