= 2003–04 AC Perugia season =

Perugia
2003–04 season
- Chairman: Luciano Gaucci
- Manager: Serse Cosmi
- Serie A: 15th
- Coppa Italia: Quarter-finals
- UEFA Intertoto Cup: Winners
- UEFA Cup: Round of 16
- Top goalscorer: League: Zé Maria (7); All: Massimo Margiotta (9)
Home colours

AC Perugia were relegated from Serie A with a bang, following a chaotic season, in which president Luciano Gaucci managed to upset the Italian football society, by claiming that the referees' were deliberately trying to relegate Perugia to Serie B. Prior to the season, he performed a PR-stunt, when signing Libyan leader Muammar Gaddafi's son Al-Saadi Gaddafi He also continued trying to sign female players, trying to sign both Hanna Ljungberg and Victoria Svensson, according to Swedish daily Aftonbladet.

In the same paper, Ancona goalkeeper Magnus Hedman accused his teammates for throwing away the final match of the season, in which Perugia won 1–0. That victory qualified Perugia for the relegation playoffs against Fiorentina, where Enrico Fantini scored in both matches for Fiorentina, ensuring Perugia was being relegated, only one year before the club folded.

The list of players representing the club during the season included 35 players, which meant the team drastically changed from game to game.

== Squad ==
=== Goalkeepers ===
- (Australia) Željko Kalac
- (Italy) Michele Tardioli
- (Italy) Stefano Pardini

=== Defenders ===
- (Brazil) Zé Maria
- (Italy) Marco Di Loreto
- (Mali) Souleymane Diamoutene
- (Italy) Giovanni Ignoffo
- (Italy) Fabio Grosso
- (Brazil) Fabiano
- (Italy) Salvatore Fresi
- (Senegal) Ferdinand Coly
- (Greece) Konstantinos Loumpoutis
- (Greece) Evangelos Nastos
- (Morocco) Jamal Alioui
- (Italy) Roberto Cardinale

=== Midfielders ===
- (Nigeria) Christian Obodo
- (Italy) Fabio Gatti
- (Italy) Massimiliano Fusani
- (Italy) Giovanni Tedesco
- (Brazil) Guilherme do Prado
- (Italy) Eusebio Di Francesco
- (Romania) Paul Codrea
- (Ivory Coast) Christian Manfredini
- (France) Gaël Genevier
- (Libya) Al-Saadi Gaddafi

=== Attackers ===
- (England) Jay Bothroyd
- (Venezuela) Massimo Margiotta
- (Italy) Fabrizio Ravanelli
- (Italy) Dario Hübner
- (Italy) Franco Brienza
- (Greece) Zisis Vryzas
- (Italy) Emanuele Berrettoni
- (Uruguay) Marcelo Zalayeta
- (Italy) Luigi Giandomenico
- (Italy) Francesco Zerbini
- (Italy) Gabriele Scandurra

== Competitions ==
=== Serie A ===
==== League table ====
Pos	Team	Pld	W	D	L	GF	GA	GD	Pts	Qualification or relegation
13	Reggina	34	6	16	12	29	45	−16	34 (Note: Reggina finished ahead of Siena on head-to-head points: Reggina 2–1 Siena, Siena 0–0 Reggina.)	
14	Siena	34	8	10	16	41	54	−13	34	
15	Perugia (R)	34	6	14	14	44	56	−12	32	Relegation play-off
16	Modena (R)	34	6	12	16	27	46	−19	30 (Note: Modena finished ahead of Empoli on head-to-head points: Empoli 0–3 Modena, Modena 1–1 Empoli.)	Relegation to Serie B
17	Empoli (R)	34	7	9	18	26	54	−28	30	Relegation to Serie B

Source: Almanacco Illustrato del Calcio – La Storia 1898-2004, Panini Edizioni, Modena, September 2005
Rules for classification: 1) points; 2) tiebreaker for relevant positions 3) head-to-head points and goal difference; 4) head-to-head goals scored; 5) goal difference; 6) number of goals scored.
(R) Relegated

==== Matches ====
1	Perugia	2–2	Siena	Perugia
	Vryzas 10'; Bothroyd 27'		Ardito 19'; Taddei 48'	Stadium: Stadio Renato Curi

2	Parma	3–0	Perugia
	Bresciano 26'; Adriano 49' (pen.); Gilardino 82'

3	Perugia	1–1	Milan	Perugia
	Vryzas 31'		Gattuso 19'	Stadium: Stadio Renato Curi

4	Chievo	4–1	Perugia
	Zanchetta 40', 52' (pen.); Semioli 66'; Santana 81'		Di Loreto 50'

5	Perugia	0–0	Reggina	Perugia
				Stadium: Stadio Renato Curi

6	Bologna	2–2	Perugia
	Dalla Bona 71'; Rossini 78'		Rossini 49' (o.g.); Bothroyd 69'

7	Perugia	3–3	Udinese	Perugia
	Di Loreto 42'; Bothroyd 44'; Margiotta 89'		Fava 36', 62', 77'	Stadium: Stadio Renato Curi

8	Modena	1–0	Perugia
	Allegretti 50'

9	Perugia	2–2	Lecce	Perugia
	Margiotta 45+2'; Grosso 82'		Chevantón 7'; Ledesma 66'	Stadium: Stadio Renato Curi

10	Lazio	3–1	Perugia
	Stanković 45+2'; Corradi 87'; Inzaghi 90+4'		Grosso 62'

11	Perugia	1–1	Empoli	Perugia
	Vryzas 40'		Rocchi 3'	Stadium: Stadio Renato Curi

12	Internazionale	2–1	Perugia
	Vieri 25', 80'		Tedesco 89'

13	Perugia	3–3	Sampdoria	Perugia
	Ignoffo 38'; Margiotta 55'; Tedesco 58'		Flachi 16', 89'; Tardioli 60' (o.g.)	Stadium: Stadio Renato Curi

14	Perugia	2–2	Brescia	Perugia
	Margiotta 5'; Dainelli 72' (o.g.)		Di Biagio 10'; Filippini 77'	Stadium: Stadio Renato Curi

15	Juventus	1–0	Perugia
	Nedvěd 29'

16	Perugia	0–1	Roma	Perugia
			Mancini 3'	Stadium: Stadio Renato Curi

17	Ancona	0–0	Perugia

18	Siena	2–1	Perugia
	Flo 87'; Menegazzo 90+2'		Ravanelli 5'

19	Perugia	2–2	Parma	Perugia
	Hübner 8'; Zé Maria 42'		Gilardino 35'; Morfeo 38'	Stadium: Stadio Renato Curi

20	Milan	2–1	Perugia
	Rui Costa 74'; Pirlo 78' (pen.)		Fresi 84' (pen.)

21	Perugia	0–2	Chievo	Perugia
			Barzagli 67'; Cossato 90+7'	Stadium: Stadio Renato Curi

22	Reggina	1–2	Perugia
	Cozza 53' (pen.)		Zé Maria 22'; Hübner 90+2'

23	Perugia	4–2	Bologna	Perugia
	Ravanelli 32'; Codrea 68'; Zé Maria 75'; Fresi 83' (pen.)		Bellucci 61', 85'	Stadium: Stadio Renato Curi

24	Udinese	1–1	Perugia
	Iaquinta 46'		Di Loreto 56'

25	Perugia	1–1	Modena	Perugia
	Zé Maria 75' (pen.)		Vignaroli 18'	Stadium: Stadio Renato Curi

26	Lecce	1–2	Perugia
	Dalmat 86'		Brienza 14'; Di Loreto 60'

27	Perugia	1–2	Lazio	Perugia
	Brienza 49'		Fiore 29'; Giannichedda 58'	Stadium: Stadio Renato Curi

28	Empoli	1–0	Perugia
	Rocchi 64'

29	Perugia	2–3	Internazionale	Perugia
	Di Francesco 50'; Hübner 58'		Adriano 24', 86'; Martins 88'	Stadium: Stadio Renato Curi

30	Sampdoria	3–2	Perugia
	Diana 38'; Flachi 44', 87'		Zé Maria 46'; Ravanelli 84'

31	Brescia	1–1	Perugia
	Baggio 45+1'		Ravanelli 38'

32	Perugia	1–0	Juventus	Perugia
	Ravanelli 49'			Stadium: Stadio Renato Curi

33	Roma	1–3	Perugia
	Cassano 12'		Zé Maria 18', 24' (pen.); Ravanelli 83'

34	Perugia	1–0	Ancona	Perugia
	Bothroyd 64'			Stadium: Stadio Renato Curi

==== Relegation play-offs ====
16 June 2004 First leg	Perugia	0–1	Fiorentina	Perugia
20:30 CEST			Fantini 10'	Stadium: Stadio Renato Curi; Attendance: 23,500; Referee: Matteo Trefoloni

20 June 2004 Second leg	Fiorentina	1–1 (2–1 agg.)	Perugia	Florence
20:30 CEST	Fantini 47'		do Prado 82'	Stadium: Stadio Artemio Franchi; Attendance: 43,000; Referee: Roberto Rosetti

Fiorentina were promoted to 2004–05 Serie A; Perugia were relegated to 2004–05 Serie B.

==== Topscorers ====
- (Brazil) Zé Maria 7
- (England) Jay Bothroyd 4
- (Italy) Fabrizio Ravanelli 4
- (Venezuela) Massimo Margiotta 4
- (Greece) Zisis Vryzas 3

== Sources ==
- RSSSF - Italy 2003/04
