= 2001–02 Hellas Verona FC season =

Hellas Verona
2001–02 season
- President: Giambattista Pastorello
- Head coach: Alberto Malesani
- Stadium: Stadio Marcantonio Bentegodi
- Serie A: 15th
- Coppa Italia: Second round
- Top goalscorer: League: Adrian Mutu (12); All: Adrian Mutu (12)
- Average home league attendance: 18,381

The 2001–02 season was Hellas Verona F.C.'s second consecutive season in second division of the Italian football league, the Serie B, and the 99th as a football club.

== Competitions ==
=== Overall record ===
Competition	First match	Last match	Starting round	Final position	Record							
Competition	First match	Last match	Starting round	Final position	Pld	W	D	L	GF	GA	GD	Win %
Serie B	26 August 2001	5 May 2002	Matchday 1	15th	34	11	6	17	41	53	−12	32.35
Coppa Italia	19 September 2001	24 October 2001	Second round	Second round	2	1	0	1	3	3	+0	50.00
Total					36	12	6	18	44	56	−12	33.33

Source: BDFutbol

=== Serie A ===
==== League table ====
Pos	Team	Pld	W	D	L	GF	GA	GD	Pts	Qualification or relegation
13	Brescia	34	9	13	12	43	52	−9	40 (Note: Brescia finished ahead of Udinese on head-to-head goal difference: Brescia 2–0 Udinese, Udinese 3–2 Brescia.)	
14	Udinese	34	11	7	16	41	52	−11	40	
15	Hellas Verona (R)	34	11	6	17	41	53	−12	39	Relegation to Serie B
16	Lecce (R)	34	6	10	18	36	56	−20	28	Relegation to Serie B
17	Fiorentina (Note: Fiorentina was denied entry to the 2002–03 Serie B season, having entered administration. It was later admitted to the Lega Professionisti Serie C after bankruptcy.) (R, E, R)	34	5	7	22	29	63	−34	22	Phoenix in Serie C2

Source: 2001–02 Serie A, Soccerway
Rules for classification: 1) Points; 2) Head-to-head points; 3) Head-to-head goal difference; 4) Goal difference; 5) Goals scored; 6) Draw. (Note: Head-to-head record is used only after all the matches between the teams in question have been played).
(E) Eliminated; (R) Relegated

==== Results summary ====
Overall								Home						Away					
Pld	W	D	L	GF	GA	GD	Pts	W	D	L	GF	GA	GD	W	D	L	GF	GA	GD
34	11	6	17	41	53	−12	39	9	3	5	23	18	+5	2	3	12	18	35	−17

Source: BDFutbol

==== Results by round ====
Round	1	2	3	4	5	6	7	8	9	10	11	12	13	14	15	16	17	18	19	20	21	22	23	24	25	26	27	28	29	30	31	32	33	34
Ground	H	A	H	A	H	A	H	A	A	H	H	A	H	A	H	A	H	A	H	A	H	A	H	A	H	H	A	A	H	A	H	A	H	A
Result	D	W	D	L	W	L	L	W	D	D	W	L	W	L	W	L	W	L	W	L	W	D	L	L	L	W	L	L	L	D	W	L	L	L
Position	10	7	8	10	7	9	7	8	7	7	9	8	8	8	8	8	8	8	8	8	7	7	7	9	10	8	9	11	11	13	12	12	14	15

Source: Serie B
A = Away; H = Home; W = Win; D = Draw; L = Loss

==== Matches ====
26 August 2001 1	Hellas Verona	1–1	Roma	Verona
20:30	Oddo 75'	Report	Samuel 45'	Stadium: Stadio Marcantonio Bentegodi; Attendance: 22,110; Referee: Stefano Farina

9 September 2001 2	Venezia	0–1	Hellas Verona	Venice
				Stadium: Stadio Pier Luigi Penzo

16 September 2001 3	Hellas Verona	1–1	Perugia	Verona
				Stadium: Stadio Marcantonio Bentegodi

23 September 2001 4	Atalanta	1–0	Hellas Verona	Bergamo
				Stadium: Stadio Atleti Azzurri d'Italia

30 September 2001 5	Hellas Verona	2–1	Lecce	Verona
				Stadium: Stadio Marcantonio Bentegodi

14 October 2001 7	Hellas Verona	0–1	Bologna	Verona
				Stadium: Stadio Marcantonio Bentegodi

21 October 2001 8	Fiorentina	0–2	Hellas Verona	Florence
				Stadium: Stadio Artemio Franchi

28 October 2001 9	Parma	2–2	Hellas Verona	Parma
				Stadium: Stadio Ennio Tardini

4 November 2001 10	Hellas Verona	2–2	Juventus	Verona
				Stadium: Stadio Marcantonio Bentegodi

18 November 2001 11	Hellas Verona	3–2	Chievo	Verona
				Stadium: Stadio Marcantonio Bentegodi

25 November 2001 12	Torino	5–1	Hellas Verona	Turin
				Stadium: Stadio Olimpico Grande Torino

2 December 2001 13	Hellas Verona	2–0	Brescia	Verona
				Stadium: Stadio Marcantonio Bentegodi

9 December 2001 14	Udinese	2–1	Hellas Verona	Udine
				Stadium: Stadio Friuli

16 December 2001 15	Hellas Verona	3–1	Lazio	Verona
				Stadium: Stadio Marcantonio Bentegodi

19 December 2001 6	Inter Milan	3–0	Hellas Verona	Milan
				Stadium: San Siro

23 December 2001 16	AC Milan	2–1	Hellas Verona	Milan
				Stadium: San Siro

6 January 2002 17	Hellas Verona	1–0	Piacenza	Verona
				Stadium: Stadio Marcantonio Bentegodi

13 January 2002 18	Roma	3–2	Hellas Verona	Rome
				Stadium: Stadio Olimpico

20 January 2002 19	Hellas Verona	1–0	Venezia	Verona
				Stadium: Stadio Marcantonio Bentegodi

27 January 2002 20	Perugia	3–1	Hellas Verona	Perugia
				Stadium: Stadio Renato Curi

3 February 2002 21	Hellas Verona	3–1	Atalanta	Verona
				Stadium: Stadio Marcantonio Bentegodi

10 February 2002 22	Lecce	1–1	Hellas Verona	Lecce
				Stadium: Stadio Via del Mare

17 February 2002 23	Hellas Verona	0–3	Inter Milan	Verona
				Stadium: Stadio Marcantonio Bentegodi

24 February 2002 24	Bologna	2–1	Hellas Verona	Bologna
				Stadium: Stadio Renato Dall'Ara

3 March 2002 25	Hellas Verona	1–2	Fiorentina	Verona
				Stadium: Stadio Marcantonio Bentegodi

10 March 2002 26	Hellas Verona	1–0	Parma	Verona
				Stadium: Stadio Marcantonio Bentegodi

17 March 2002 27	Juventus	1–0	Hellas Verona	Turin
				Stadium: Stadio Olimpico Grande Torino

24 March 2002 28	Chievo	2–1	Hellas Verona	Verona
				Stadium: Stadio Marcantonio Bentegodi

30 March 2002 29	Hellas Verona	0–1	Torino	Verona
15:00		Report	Franco 26'	Stadium: Stadio Marcantonio Bentegodi; Attendance: 14,532; Referee: Massimiliano Saccani

7 April 2002 30	Brescia	0–0	Hellas Verona	Brescia
15:00		Report		Stadium: Stadio Mario Rigamonti; Attendance: 14,989; Referee: Fiorenzo Treossi

14 April 2002 31	Hellas Verona	1–0	Udinese	Verona
15:00	Frick 33'	Report		Stadium: Stadio Marcantonio Bentegodi; Attendance: 17,235; Referee: Domenico Messina

21 April 2002 32	Lazio	5–4	Hellas Verona	Rome
15:00	Stam 28'; López 31' (pen.); Stanković 45', 51'; Crespo 76'	Report	Frick 9'; Colucci 79'; Cossato 88'; Adaílton 90'	Stadium: Stadio Olimpico; Attendance: 38,685; Referee: Stefano Farina

28 April 2002 33	Hellas Verona	1–2	AC Milan	Verona
15:00	Mutu 28'	Report	Inzaghi 65'; Pirlo 82'	Stadium: Stadio Marcantonio Bentegodi; Attendance: 22,314; Referee: Stefano Farina

5 May 2002 34	Piacenza	3–0	Hellas Verona	Piacenza
15:00	Volpi 25'; Hübner 47' (pen.), 84'	Report		Stadium: Stadio Leonardo Garilli; Attendance: 15,700; Referee: Cosimo Bolognino
