= Hélène Sparrow =

Polish microbiologist and public health pioneer (1891–1970)

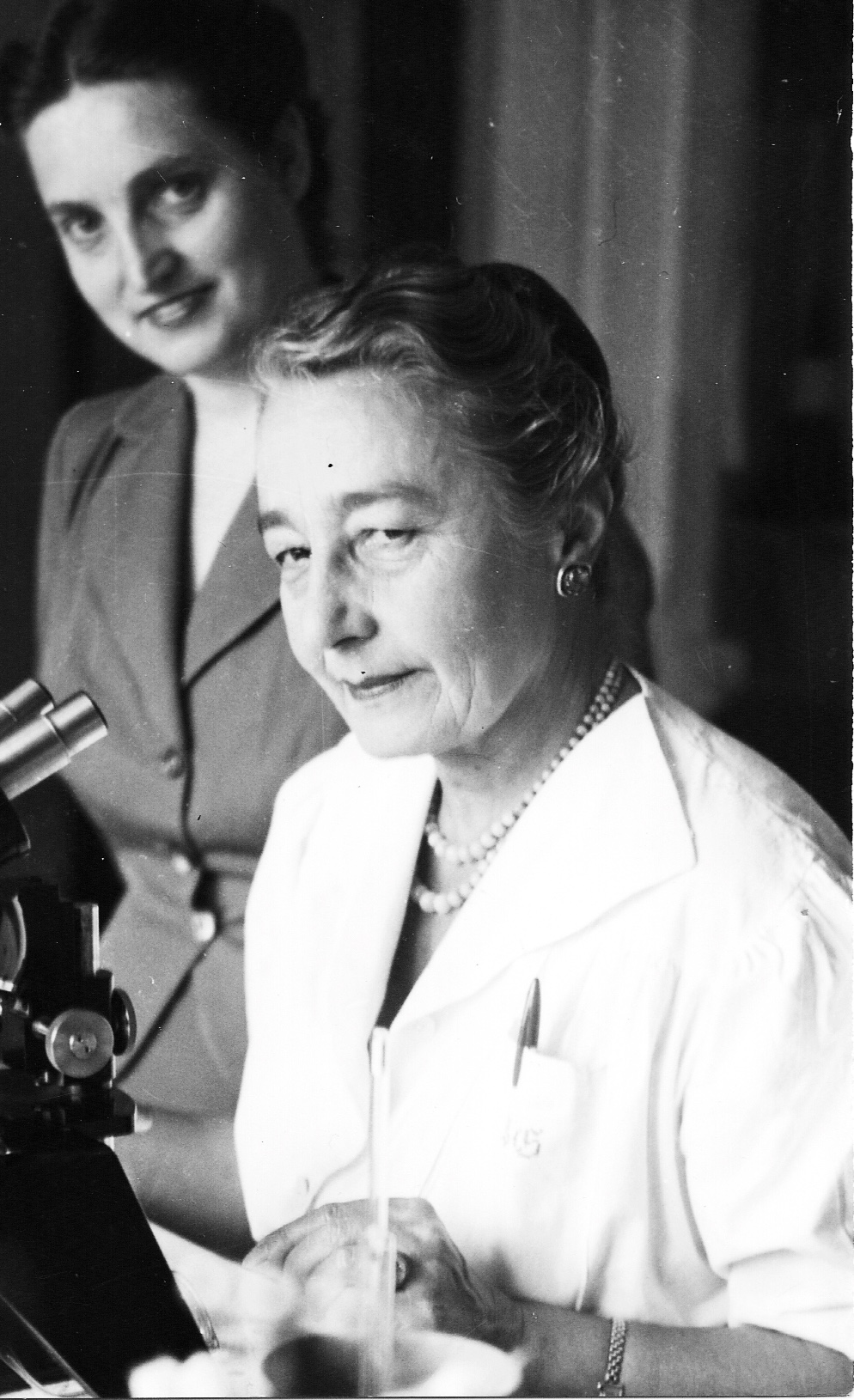
- Born: 5 June 1891; Bohuslav, Russian Empire (now, Ukraine)
- Died: 13 November 1970 (aged 79); Pietranera, Corsica, France
- Other name: Hélène Sparrow-Germa
- Spouses: Baron R von Kuegelgen (12 November 1887 - 1932); Phillippe Germa, agricultural engineer c.1890 - 1960
- Awards: Kraków Medical Academy Prize for research into typhus exanthematique (1922); Member Société de Pathologie Exotique (1945)
- Institutions: Institute of Bacteriology, Kiev; University of Poznan; University of Warsaw; Pasteur Institute Tunis
- Thesis: Problèmes de la vaccination contre le typhus exanthématique (The problems of vaccinations against exanthematic typhus) (1928)

Hélène Sparrow (5 June 1891 – 13 November 1970), was a Polish medical doctor and bacteriologist. She helped to control epidemics including: typhoid fever, cholera, dysentery, and smallpox. Throughout the 1920s, Sparrow worked with the Polish Armed Forces at the State Institute of Hygiene in Warsaw. While at the State Institute of Hygiene, she produced the first vaccine against typhus and ran vaccination campaigns to control the spread of diphtheria and scarlet fever along the eastern frontiers of Poland. In 1933, Sparrow began to study flea-borne and louse-borne rickettsia diseases in Tunis, where she led her own department at the Pasteur Institute. In her later years, she expanded her studies to include Mexico and Guatemala where she developed a protective vaccine against typhus. She contributed significant research to the World Health Organization on relapsing fever in Ethiopia.

== Early life ==
Sparrow was born on 5 June 1891 in Bohuslav, Kiev Governorate. Her parents married in 1890. Her mother was X. Stefanska (b. c 1870) and her father Leopold Sparrow (born c. 1860) was a magistrate of English origin. She was educated at a secondary school in Kiev, gaining a gold medal and then attended the Faculty of Medicine in Kiev, obtaining a medical diploma (cum laude) in 1915. She obtained a second degree in medicine from University of Poznań in 1923. She obtained her doctorate in 1928 from the University of Warsaw.

== Academic career ==
In 1915 she became involved in the control of epidemic disease within the Russian army during the First World War. Once fighting ended, she began working in clinics in Dorpat (now Tartu, Estonia), supervised by Professor Bylina, soon moving to the Institute of Bacteriology in Kiev as an assistant to Wolodymyr Lindeman. She began to work on epidemic typhus with Oleksii Krontovski and L. Polev. In 1920 she went to Warsaw to work with Dr Ludwik Rajchman, the Director of the State Institute of Hygiene. In 1922 she was appointed Chief of Service and then in 1928 became the Chief of the Preventative Vaccinations Service. This included organising vaccination campaigns and also investigation of cholera outbreaks. She obtained a second medical degree from University of Poznań in 1923. Between 1921 and 1933 she also worked with Rudolf Weigl at the University of Lwów on epidemic typhus. During this time she was involved in setting up four public health laboratories in eastern Poland to benefit people relocated following national boundary changes as well as supervising large-scale programmes of vaccination against diphtheria and scarlet fever in the Warsaw region, supported by Robert Debré. She obtained her first tenured academic post in 1928 as an associate professor in the Faculty of Medicine at the University of Warsaw, presenting her doctoral thesis on Problèmes de la vaccination contre le typhus exanthématique (The problems of vaccinations against exanthematic typhus) and was subsequently the Professor of Bacteriology. She managed microbiology training and actively participating in medical societies in Poland and the Warsaw branch of the French Société de biologie into the 1930s.

=== Pasteur Institute ===
In 1923 a grant from the League of Nations took her to France for the beginning of her lifelong involvement with the Pasteur Institute. She studied tuberculosis with Albert Calmette and Camille Guérin in Lille, then worked with Jules Bordet in Brussels and also with Amédée Borrel at the Institute of Health in Strasbourg. In 1924 she was again sent to France for training in microbiology at the Pasteur Institute and in the laboratory of Alexandre Besredka. There she met Charles Nicolle during his annual conference on typhus, changing the course of her life.

Sparrow and Nicolle began working together, with their main studies being focused on typhus, specifically the ways in which it spread and how to create a vaccine to limit the contagion. At the beginning of the 20th century, little was known about epidemic typhus. The only known facts about typhus was that it was a dangerous and deadly disease that spread rapidly amongst dense populations, with its principal factors for transmission being dirty clothing and overcrowding. In September 1909, Nicolle made the discovery that lice were the primary vectors for typhus. This discovery came after observing typhus patients in Tunis. Nicolle stated that patients infected others on the street as well as hospital personnel working with dirty laundry, but once patients were admitted to the hospital and given a hot bath and clean clothing, they ceased to be infectious. This observation led Nicolle to look closer at the lice, as these were suspected to be responsible for transmitting typhus. For three months, Nicolle tested his lice transmission theory in the laboratory by injecting an uninfected chimpanzee with blood from a patient infected with typhus and letting lice feed on this now infected host. After a couple of days, the lice were transferred to a healthy chimpanzee to allow them to feed on an uninfected host. The second chimpanzee soon contracted typhus, resulting in a positive correlation between lice and the transmission of typhus. The first step in the search for a vector for transmission of typhus was complete, but there were many challenges ahead.

Nicolle, Sparrow and others aimed to produce a vaccine. In 1925, the Pasteur Institute financed her research with Nicolle into epidemic typhus in Tunisia. While searching for a vaccine against typhus, Nicolle and Sparrow encountered many obstacles. Initially, Nicolle and Sparrow mixed typhus bacilli with blood serum from recovered patients. This mixture aided in keeping Nicolle himself in good health, but unfortunately fell short when trying to cure patients who were already infected with typhus.

In 1931, she was sent by the government, along with Charles Nicolle, to study epidemic typhus in Mexico and Guatemala, where they administered their typhus serum to the public. In 1932, Sparrow and Nicolle turned their attention to the Weigl vaccine. Rudolf Weigl had developed a technique for a typhus vaccine that involved producing numerous infected lice and then grinding them to create a vaccine paste. After Nicolle's death in 1936, Sparrow continued her research into a typhus vaccine. With her previous experience of the Weigl vaccine, Sparrow began to work exclusively on vaccines cultured in the lungs of small mammals. This led to her 1935 research on murine viruses as a potential basis of an anti-typhoid vaccine. In 1940, Paul Durand and Sparrow teamed up and began work on new culturing methods for typhus rickettsiae. It was through this partnership that they developed the Durand-Sparrow anti-typhoid vaccine. Sparrow also worked to culture the agent of spotted fever as a prelude to a vaccine against Rocky Mountain spotted fever.

Her transfer of expertise in the laboratory culture of lice was important for progress against typhus at the Pasteur Institute in Tunis. This included development of a vaccine, trials of insecticides and isolation of bacteria that were the causal agents of typhus and typhus-like fevers. She was allowed to continue working at the Pasteur Institute until 1961 as 'Chef de Service', beyond the compulsory retirement age and from 1949 was the Head of the vaccine service, immunizing against tuberculosis. From 1955 she was in charge of work on relapsing fever in Ethiopia for the World Health Organization.

== Personal life ==
She married Baron Robert von Kuegelgen from Estonia in 1917, a surgeon in the Russian army, but they eventually separated. They had a daughter, Marie Bogna Seiler von Kugelgen. Sparrow became a French national in 1933. In October 1933 she married Phillippe Germa, an agriculturalist.

During the Second World War she hosted French refugees (including André Gide) and Polish deserters in Tunis. Gide arrived in December 1942 while it was occupied by German and Italian troops, remaining until May 1943 when French, British and American forces re-took the city and he was able to travel to Algiers. During this time he recorded in his journal that Sparrow was present at, or hosted, several lunch engagements for mutual friends within the French community. Gide also recounts how Sparrow narrowly escaped death during bombing raids. On 1 January 1943, while she was in the building, a bomb fell on the ground-floor apartment where Sparrow lodged with the Boutelleau family, but it did not explode. Five days later, on 6 January, bombs destroyed two adjacent houses.

Sparrow and her second husband planted an orange orchard together in Soukra, near Tunis. During the final French withdrawal from Tunis, the couple left Tunisia to retire to Corsica. She died at Pietranera in Corsica in 1970.

== Awards and honours ==
- Prize, Kraków Medical Academy, 1922
- Head of Laboratory, Institute of State Health, Warsaw 1922
- Head of Preventive Vaccination Service, Institute of State Health, Warsaw 1928
- Head of Laboratory, Institute Pasteur, Tunis 1933
- Head of Vaccination Service, Pasteur Institute, Tunis 1945 - 1961
- Elected member of the Société de Pathologie Exotique (French Society of Exotic Pathology) 1945

In 2026, Sparrow was announced as one of 72 historical women in STEM whose names have been proposed to be added to the 72 men already celebrated on the Eiffel Tower. The plan was announced by the Mayor of Paris, Anne Hidalgo following the recommendations of a committee led by Isabelle Vauglin of Femmes et Sciences and Jean-François Martins, representing the operating company which runs the Eiffel Tower.

== Selected publications ==
She was author or co-author of at least 103 scientific publications. Some of the most significant are:

- Sparrow H. "Sur une souche de Rickettsia quintana isolee en Tunisie" Pathologia et Microbiologia, Vol. 24 (1961) pp. 140 -
- Heisch RB., Sparrow H., Harvey AE. "The behavior of Spirochaeta recurrentis Lebert in lice." Bulletin de la Société de pathologie exotique et de ses filiales, Vol 53 (1960) pp. 140 – 143
- Sparrow, H. "Etude du foyer ethiopien de fievre recurrente (Study of the Ethiopian source of recurrent fever)" Bulletin of the World Health Organization Vol. 19, No. 2 (1958) pp. 673 – 710
- Sparrow H. "Emploi des ratons noveaunes pour entrien de Borrelia recurrentis.(Use of newborn rats for maintenance of Borrelia recurrentis)" Bulletin de la Société de pathologie exotique et de ses filiales, Vol. 49 No. 4 (1956) pp. 630 -
- Durand P., Sparrow H., "Pulmonary inoculation in typhic and spotty viruses" Comptes Rendus Hebdomadaires des Seances de L'Acadamie des Sciences, Vol. 210 (1940) pp. 420 – 422
- Nicolle C., Sparrow H., "Experiments on the river virus of Japan (Tsutsugamushi)." Comptes Rendus Hebdomadaires des Seances de L'Acadamie des Sciences, Vol. 199 pp. (1934) 1349 - 1351
- Nicolle C., Sparrow H., Conseil E. "Preventative vaccination of man against exanthematic typhus by use of small repeated virulent doses (the brain of guinea pig)." Comptes Rendus Hebdomadaires des Seances de L'Acadamie des Sciences, Vol. 184 (1927) pp. 859 – 861
- Sparrow H. "Immunization against scarlet fever with the aid of the scarlet fever toxoid" Comptes Rendus des Seances de la Societe de Biologie et de ses filiales, Vol. 97 (1927) pp. 957 – 959
