= Stefano Pardini =

Italian footballer (born 1975)

Personal information
- Full name: Stefano Pardini
- Date of birth: 24 December 1975 (age 50)
- Place of birth: Montignoso, Italy
- Height: 1.90 m (6 ft 3 in)
- Position: Goalkeeper

Youth career
- Reggiana

Senior career*
| Years | Team | Apps | (Gls) |
| 1995–1996 | Reggiana | 0 | (0) |
| 1996–2000 | Carrarese | 44 | (0) |
| 2000–2002 | Fermana | 61 | (0) |
| 2002–2003 | Sambenedettese | 33 | (0) |
| 2003–2004 | Perugia | 2 | (0) |
| 2005–2006 | Cuoiopelli Cappiano | 0 | (0) |
| 2006–2007 | Carrarese | 33 | (0) |
| 2007–2008 | Ravenna | 5 | (0) |
| 2008–2010 | Figline | 59 | (0) |
| 2010–2011 | Lucchese | 5 | (0) |
- * Club domestic league appearances and goals

Stefano Pardini (born 24 December 1975) is an Italian football coach and former goalkeeper.

== Playing career ==
Born in Montignoso, Tuscany, Pardini started his career at Emilia–Romagna side Reggiana. In the 1995–96 Serie B season, he played as 4th keeper behind Marco Ballotta, Ettore Gandini and Alessio Costagli, who played as unused bench in round 22. He then spent 4 seasons for Serie C1 side Carrarese, where he played as a regular starter in the last season. He then played for Serie C1 side Fermana and Sambenedettese as first choice.

In November 2003, he signed an annual contract with Serie A side Perugia as Željko Kalac's backup along with Michele Tardioli. He played 2 league matches and 3 Coppa Italia matches. He then without a club for a season before signed by Serie C2 side Cuoiopelli Cappiano in 2005–06 season. In 2006–07 season, he returned to Carrarese of Serie C2.

In June 2007, he signed a 1-year contract with newly promoted Serie B side Ravenna. He worked as Luca Capecchi then as Vincenzo Marruocco's backup ahead youth product Gian Maria Rossi. He did not stayed with Ravenna which relegated in June 2008.

In the 2008–09 season, he was signed by Lega Pro Seconda Divisione side Figline along with Juventus backup keeper Cristiano Novembre. Pardini played the whole 2008–09 season as the first choice and won the league Championship. In the 2009–10 season, he remained as one of the starting XI.

== Coaching career ==
In 2019, Pardini joined the coaching staff of Silvio Baldini at Carrarese as a goalkeeping coach, a role he kept until Baldini's resignations in April 2021; following that, he stayed on at Carrarese as a collaborator, leaving the club by the end of the 2020–21 season.

On 24 December 2021, he signed for Palermo as a goalkeeping coach, following the appointment of Baldini as new head coach. He was dismissed from his role on 28 July 2022, following Baldini's resignations.
