= Federico Giunti =

Italian footballer turned manager (born 1971)

Personal information
- Date of birth: 6 August 1971 (age 55)
- Place of birth: Perugia, Italy
- Height: 1.79 m (5 ft 10 in)
- Position: Midfielder

Senior career*
Years	Team	Apps	(Gls)
1987–1991	Città di Castello		
1991–1997	Perugia	166	(24)
1997–1999	Parma	15	(0)
1999–2001	AC Milan	54	(1)
2001–2004	Brescia	27	(2)
2003–2004	→ Beşiktaş (loan)	40	(1)
2004–2005	Bologna	23	(2)
2005–2007	Chievo	37	(0)
2008	Treviso	10	(0)

International career
1996	Italy	1	(0)

Managerial career
- 2010–2011: Foligno
- 2012–2013: Castel Rigone
- 2013–2015: Gualdo Casacastalda
- 2015: Foligno
- 2016–2017: Maceratese
- 2017: Perugia
- 2018–2022: AC Milan U19
- * Club domestic league appearances and goals

Federico Giunti (Italian pronunciation: [fedeˈriːko ˈdʒunti]; born 6 August 1971) is an Italian former footballer turned manager, who played as a midfielder in the role of deep-lying playmaker. He was most recently the current manager of Milan Primavera.

== Club career ==
A playmaking central midfielder who was a renowned free-kick specialist, Giunti began his career in the mid-1980s, with the Città di Castello youth system, making his professional debut in 1987, and winning the Regional Promozione divisione in 1991. He later moved to Perugia, and he was part of the team that was promoted to Serie A from Serie C1 in three years. During his first season in Serie C1 with the club, he made 20 appearances, and during the 1992–93 season, he made 28 appearances and scored 4 goals. Perugia won the 1993–94 Serie C1/B title, earning promotion to Serie B, as Giunti managed 4 goals in 24 appearances. During his first season in Serie B, he scored 7 goals in 29 appearances, and the following season, he helped Perugia gain Serie A promotion, scoring 5 goals in 25 appearances. During the 1996–97 Serie A season, he made his Serie A debut on 8 September 1996, in a home 1–0 win against Sampdoria.

Parma acquired Giunti for the 1997–98 season, although he had a difficult season with the club, only making 13 appearances, as he was mainly kept on the bench. Halfway through his second season with Parma, after making only two appearances, he joined Milan in January 1999 (in a swap deal with Giuseppe Cardone), making six appearances, as Milan won the 1998–99 Serie A title that season. He played with Milan for two more seasons, during a dark period in the club's history, making 24 appearances in both seasons. He scored three goals during his Milan career; the first came in the UEFA Champions League against Galatasaray in 1999, the second against Fiorentina in the 2000–01 Coppa Italia and the third in a famous 6–0 win over city rivals Internazionale, in 2001.

In July 2001, he joined Brescia under manager Carlo Mazzone, where he played alongside players such as Roberto Baggio, Pep Guardiola, Stephen Appiah and Luca Toni, making 27 appearances with the club and scoring two goals. In January 2003, Giunti also played on loan with Beşiktaş for 18 months, making him the first Italian player in the national Turkish league, making 16 appearances and scoring one goal, as Beşiktaş won the 2002–03 Süper Lig, and 24 appearances during his second season with the club.

In July 2004, Giunti signed a one-year contract with Bologna. He also moved along with former Brescia teammate Fabio Petruzzi, making 23 appearances and scoring two goals.

After Bologna lost the relegation playoffs, Giunti moved to Chievo in 2005. He made 28 appearances in his first season, helping Chievo to qualify for Europe, but just nine more the second season, before he joined Treviso on loan in January 2008. He retired in June 2008.

== International career ==
Giunti's only cap for the Italy national team was in a friendly match against Bosnia and Herzegovina, on 6 November 1996, under manager Arrigo Sacchi.

== Coaching career ==
Giunti started his coaching career guiding the Allievi Nazionali (under-17) youth team of Perugia during the 2009–10 season. After Perugia declared bankrupt, Giunti joined Foligno as new coach of the Berretti (under-19) in July 2010. In December 2010, he was appointed head coach of Foligno, replacing dismissed boss Salvatore Matrecano, but was fired later in April 2011 due to poor results.

In October 2012, he was named new head coach of Serie D amateurs Castel Rigone, being fired in March 2013.

In November 2013, he was appointed at the helm of Serie D club Gualdo Casacastalda, and was also confirmed for the following 2014–15 season. In June 2015 he returned at Foligno, only to be fired later on September.

He successively served as head coach of Lega Pro club Maceratese for the 2016–17 season.

On 23 June 2017, he was named new head coach of Serie B club Perugia for the new season.

On 29 December 2018 he was announced as new head coach of AC Milan Primavera. On 28 April 2022, he was dismissed by Milan.

== Honours ==
Milan

- Serie A: 1998–99

Beşiktaş

- Turkish Süper Lig: 2002–03

Chievo

- Serie B: 2007–08

Perugia

- Serie C1, Girone B: 1993–94
