= Dmitri Popov =

Russian retired footballer (born 1967)

Dmitri Popov Дмитрий Попов
Personal information
- Full name: Dmitri Lvovich Popov
- Date of birth: 27 February 1967 (age 59)
- Place of birth: Yaroslavl, Soviet Union
- Height: 1.74 m (5 ft 9 in)
- Position: Midfielder

Youth career
- FC Shinnik

Senior career*
Years	Team	Apps	(Gls)
1984–1989	FC Shinnik	129	(11)
1989–1993	Spartak Moscow	78	(7)
1993–1996	Racing Santander	98	(21)
1996–1999	Compostela	76	(4)
1999	Toledo	6	(0)
2000	Maccabi Tel Aviv	4	(0)
Total		391	(43)

International career
1992–1998	Russia	21	(4)

Managerial career
- 2006–2008: FC Spartak Moscow (scout)
- 2008–2016: FC Spartak Moscow (sporting director)
- 2020–2021: FC Spartak Moscow (sporting director)
- * Club domestic league appearances and goals

Dmitri Lvovich Popov (Russian: Дмитрий Львович Попов; born 27 February 1967) is a Russian football official and a former player who played as a left midfielder.

== Football career ==
Popov was born in Yaroslavl, Soviet Union. He started playing professionally at local FC Shinnik Yaroslavl, then signed with country giants FC Spartak Moscow.

In 1993, Popov moved to Spain alongside teammate Dmitri Radchenko, and would spend there the following six-and-a-half years, with Racing de Santander (in the 1995–96 season, he teamed up there with compatriot Ilshat Faizulin), SD Compostela and CD Toledo. In January 2000 he joined Israel's Maccabi Tel Aviv FC, retiring at the end of the campaign.

Popov returned to Spartak Moscow in 2008, as its director of football. He obtained 21 caps and scored four goals for the Russian national team, and was part of the national squad at the 1994 FIFA World Cup. In 2009, he played in the national senior XI that won the Legends Cup.

== Honours ==
- Soviet Top League: 1989
- Soviet Cup: 1992
- Russian Premier League: 1992, 1993

== International goals ==
No.	Date	Venue	Opponent	Score	Result	Competition
1.	16 August 1992	Moscow, Russia	Mexico	2–0	2–0	Friendly
2.	24 March 1993	Haifa, Israel	Israel	1–0	2–2	Friendly
3.	24 March 1993	Haifa, Israel	Israel	2–0	2–2	Friendly
4.	9 January 1997	So Kon Po, Hong Kong	Yugoslavia	1–1	1–1 (6–5 p)	1997 Lunar New Year Cup
