= Cristiano Novembre =

Italian footballer (born 1987)

Personal information
- Full name: Cristiano Novembre
- Date of birth: 15 June 1987 (age 39)
- Place of birth: Brindisi, Italy
- Height: 1.88 m (6 ft 2 in)
- Position: Goalkeeper

Team information
- Current team: Brindisi

Youth career
- 1994–2003: Brindisi
- 2003–2006: Lecce

Senior career*
Years	Team	Apps	(Gls)
2006–2007	Fano	32	(0)
2007–2008	Juventus	0	(0)
2008–2010	Figline	11	(0)
2010–2011	Caratese	17	(0)
2011	Brindisi	0	(0)
2011–2012	Nissa	15	(0)
2012	Nardò	2	(0)
2012–	Brindisi		
- * Club domestic league appearances and goals as of 4 July 2013

Cristiano Novembre (born 15 June 1987) is an Italian footballer who plays as a goalkeeper for Serie D club Brindisi.

== Club career ==
=== Youth career ===
Born in Brindisi, Apulia, Novembre started his career for Brindisi at the age of seven. He remained at the club, with the youth system until 2003, when he transferred into the youth squad of Serie A side U.S. Lecce.

In July 2003, Novembre was signed by another team from Apulia, in the form of U.S. Lecce, where he played three seasons in the youths system. He remained with the club until 2006, when he transferred to Serie D side Fano. He never made a senior appearance for Lecce.

=== Debut ===
Novembre officially began his senior career with non-(fully)-professional club, Serie D side Fano, where he was the starting goalkeeper for the entire 2006–07 Serie D season, making 32 appearances. Following several impressive displays, Novembre was scouted by European powerhouse Juventus FC, which won its historical Serie B champion title back to Serie A after relegation due to the 2006 Italian football scandal.

=== Juventus ===
In July 2007, Juventus FC officially offered a contract to Novembre. Juventus youth goalkeeper, Antonio Mirante was sent out on loan during that transfer window and hence, Novembre and Jess Vanstrattan were signed to provide extra cover for first choice Gianluigi Buffon and experienced backup Emanuele Belardi. Despite taking part in several friendly matches, as well as summer tournaments, Novembre spent the entire 2007–2008 season behind Buffon, Belardi, and Vanstrattan in the pecking order, partially due to his young age and lack of experience. In June 2008, Novembre was released.

=== Lega Pro ===
In July 2008, Novembre joined Figline as free agent, serving as a reserve to experienced goalie Stefano Pardini in his first season with the club. Novembre did make four league appearances in the first season for the Lega Pro Seconda Divisione Champions. In his second season with the club, Novembre continued to serve as a back-up to Pardini and made an additional seven appearances in the league.

=== Return to Serie D ===
On 10 December 2010, Novembre was signed by Serie D, Girone B side Caratese, following two disappointing seasons as a reserve for Figline. In June 2011 he was released. In September, Novembre returned to his hometown club, Brindisi. He left the club in November 2011 and returned to the hometown club in December 2012.

== Personal life ==
Novembre holds a diploma in accountancy and has a sister Giada.
