= Igor Simutenkov =

Russian footballer

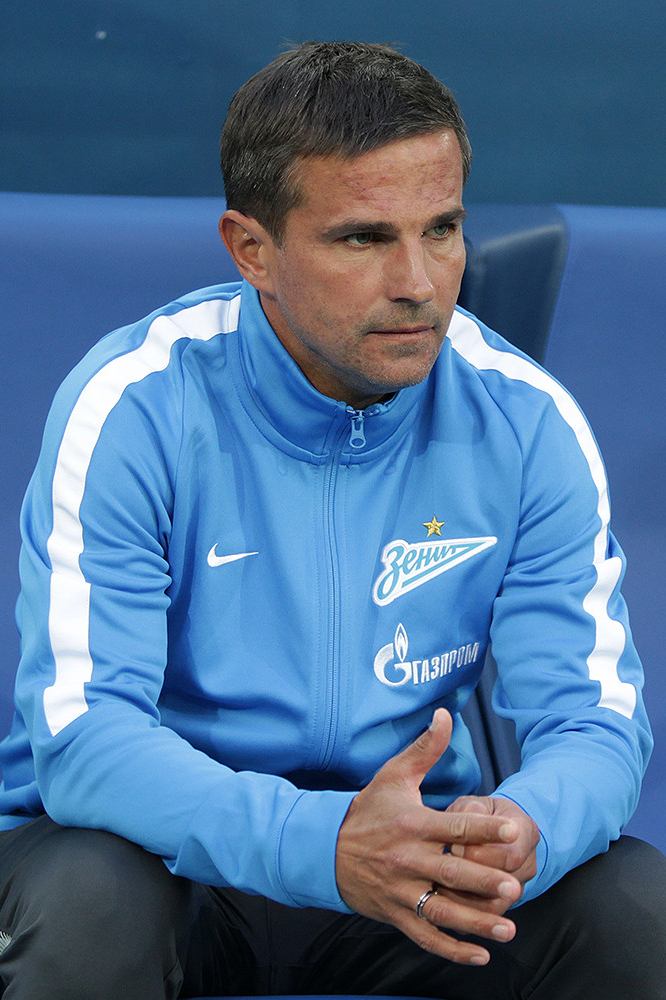
- Coaching Zenit in 2017

Personal information
- Full name: Igor Vitalyevich Simutenkov
- Date of birth: 3 April 1973 (age 53)
- Place of birth: Moscow, USSR
- Height: 1.74 m (5 ft 9 in)
- Position: Forward

Team information
- Current team: Zenit Saint Petersburg (asst manager)

Youth career
- 1981–1984: SDYuShOR Smena
- 1985–1989: SK EShVSM Moscow

Senior career*
Years	Team	Apps	(Gls)
1990–1994	Dynamo Moscow	114	(44)
1994–1998	Reggiana	97	(20)
1998–1999	Bologna	14	(3)
2000–2002	Tenerife	55	(4)
2002–2004	Kansas City Wizards	49	(12)
2005	Rubin Kazan	1	(0)
2006	Dynamo Voronezh	17	(4)
Total		347	(87)

International career
1992	USSR U-21	3	(2)
1992–1995	Russia U-21	17	(4)
1994–1998	Russia	20	(9)

Managerial career
- 2007: Torpedo-RG Moscow
- 2007–2009: Russia (youth born in 1993)
- 2009–2015: Zenit Saint Petersburg (assistant)
- 2014–2015: Russia (assistant)
- 2015–2017: Zenit Saint Petersburg (reserves)
- 2017–: Zenit Saint Petersburg (assistant)
- * Club domestic league appearances and goals

Igor Vitalyevich Simutenkov (Russian: Игорь Витальевич Симутенков; born 3 April 1973) is a Russian football coach and a former player. He works as assistant manager at Zenit Saint Petersburg.

== Club career ==
A forward, Simutenkov started his professional career in the old Soviet league with Dynamo Moscow in 1990. He spent the next five years with Dynamo, the last three in the Russian league, which he led in scoring with 21 goals in 1994. A transfer to Serie A's Reggiana followed, and Simutenkov spent the next five seasons in Italy (the last with Bologna), scoring a total of only 23 goals. He clinched the promotion to Serie A during the 1995–96 season with Carlo Ancelotti as manager.

In 1999, Simutenkov transferred to Spanish club Tenerife, and spent three uneventful seasons there. He signed with the Kansas City Wizards in 2002, becoming Major League Soccer's first Russian player. Igor scored four goals in his first season (plus one in playoffs), seven in his second (plus two in playoffs), before missing a big chunk of the third with an injury, ending with a solitary goal in league play. He scored the golden goal in the final of the 2004 Lamar Hunt U.S. Open Cup, but was released by the Wizards following the 2004 season, at which time he returned to Russia and signed with Rubin.

At the end of season 2005, while made only three appearances for Rubin Kazan, Simutenkov declared his retirement from professional football. He told that he could not perform at the high level because of a few serious permanent injuries. However, in 2006 he was included in the squad of FC Dynamo Voronezh, a Second Division side.

Simutenkov is also known for the famous Simutenkov-case in which the European Court of Justice acknowledged the direct effect of the partnership-agreement between the European Communities and Russia. In this judgment Spanish nationality-clauses for non-EU footballers were found in breach with Community law.

== International career ==
Simutenkov has scored nine goals in 20 caps for the Russia national team, playing in Euro 96, but his last appearance came in 1998.

He was part of the Russia squad that won the 2009 Legends Cup.

== Coaching career ==
In 2007, Simutenkov managed a Russian Second Division team in FC Torpedo-RG. From 2007 till the end of 2009 he was a coach of Russia 1993-born youth team. On 18 December 2009, he was appointed an assistant coach at Zenit Saint Petersburg with Luciano Spalletti as the head coach.

== Playing statistics ==
=== Club ===
Appearances and goals by club, season and competition
Club	Season	League		
Club	Season	Division	Apps	Goals
Dynamo Moscow	1990	Soviet Top League	1	0
Dynamo Moscow	1991	Soviet Top League	18	3
Dynamo Moscow	1992	Russian Top League	24	4
Dynamo Moscow	1993	Russian Top League	33	16
Dynamo Moscow	1994	Russian Top League	28	21
Dynamo Moscow	Total		114	44
Reggiana	1994–95	Serie A	15	4
Reggiana	1995–96	Serie B	33	8
Reggiana	1996–97	Serie A	30	6
Reggiana	1997–98	Serie B	19	2
Reggiana	Total		97	20
Bologna	1998–99	Serie A	14	3
Tenerife	1999–2000	Segunda División	18	1
Tenerife	2000–01	Segunda División	28	3
Tenerife	2001–02	La Liga	9	0
Tenerife	Total		55	4
Kansas City Wizards	2002	MLS	19	4
Kansas City Wizards	2003	MLS	21	7
Kansas City Wizards	2004	MLS	9	1
Kansas City Wizards	Total		49	12
Rubin Kazan	2005	Russian Premier League	1	0
Dynamo Voronezh	2006	Russian Second Division	17	4
Career total			347	87

=== International ===
#	Date	Venue	Opponent	Score	Result	Competition
1	1994-08-17	Wörtherseestadion, Klagenfurt, Austria	Austria	0 – 3	0–3	Friendly match
2	1996-02-11	Ta' Qali National Stadium, Ta' Qali, Malta	Slovenia	1 – 0	3–1	1996 Rothmans Cup
3	1996-02-11	Ta' Qali National Stadium, Ta' Qali, Malta	Slovenia	3 – 0	3–1	1996 Rothmans Cup
4	1996-05-29	Dynamo Stadium, Moscow, Russia	United Arab Emirates	1 – 0	1–0	Friendly match
5	1997-02-10	Hong Kong Stadium, So Kon Po, Hong Kong	Switzerland	1 – 0	2–1	1997 Carlsberg Cup
6	1997-02-10	Hong Kong Stadium, So Kon Po, Hong Kong	Switzerland	2 – 0	2–1	1997 Carlsberg Cup
7	1997-03-29	Dimotiko Stadium, Paralimni, Cyprus	Cyprus	1 – 1	1–1	1998 FIFA World Cup qualification
8	1997-04-30	Dynamo Stadium, Moscow, Russia	Luxembourg	3 – 0	3–0	1998 FIFA World Cup qualification
9	1998-05-30	Boris Paichadze National Stadium, Tbilisi, Georgia (country)	Georgia	0 – 1	1–1	Friendly match

== Honours ==
Individual

- Russia's best football player: 1994
