= 1997 Lunar New Year Cup =

Tournament details
- Host country: Hong Kong
- Dates: 23 – 26 January
- Teams: 4
- Venue: 1 (in 1 host city)

Final positions
- Champions: Russia (1st title)

Tournament statistics
- Matches played: 4
- Goals scored: 13 (3.25 per match)
- Top scorer: (Federal Republic of Yugoslavia) Anto Drobnjak (3 goals)

The 1997 Lunar New Year Cup (a.k.a. Carlsberg Cup) was a football tournament held in Hong Kong over the first and fourth day of the Chinese New Year holiday.

== Participating teams ==
- Hong Kong League XI (host)
- Russia
- Switzerland
- FR Yugoslavia

== Results ==
All times given in Hong Kong Time (UTC+8).

=== Semifinals ===
23 January 1997

Russia	1–1	FR Yugoslavia
Popov 62'		Drobnjak 40'
Penalties
	6–5

Hong Kong Stadium, Hong Kong
Attendance: 25,430
Referee: Hugh Dallas (Scotland)

23 January 1997

Hong Kong League XI	1–4	Switzerland
Muir 55'		Yakin 32' (pen.); Kunz 38', 70'; Weiler 90'

Hong Kong Stadium, Hong Kong
Attendance: 25,430
Referee: Leif Sundell (Sweden)

=== Third place match ===
26 January 1997

Hong Kong League XI	1–3	FR Yugoslavia
Silva 60'		Milosevic 7'; Drobnjak 17', 32'

Hong Kong Stadium, Hong Kong
Attendance: 20,167
Referee: Leif Sundell (Sweden)

=== Final ===
26 January 1997

Russia	2–1	Switzerland
Simutenkov 23', 36'		Thüler 79'

Hong Kong Stadium, Hong Kong
Attendance: 20,167
Referee: Hugh Dallas (Scotland)

== Bracket ==
Semi-finals
23 January 1997 – Hong Kong
Russia (pen.)	1 (6)
FR Yugoslavia	1 (5)
23 January 1997 – Hong Kong
Switzerland	4
Hong Kong League XI	1

Final
26 January 1997 – Hong Kong
Russia	2
Switzerland	1
Third place
26 January 1997 – Hong Kong
FR Yugoslavia	3
Hong Kong League XI	1

1997 Carlsberg Cup Winner
Russia
First Title

== Top scorers ==
3 goals

- (Federal Republic of Yugoslavia) Anto Drobnjak

2 goals

- (Russia) Igor Simutenkov
- (Switzerland) Adrian Kunz

1 goal

- (Hong Kong) Silva
- (Hong Kong) Muir
- (Switzerland) Patrick Thuler
- (Switzerland) Murat Yakin
- (Switzerland) Rene Weiler
- (Russia) Dmitri Popov
- (Federal Republic of Yugoslavia) Savo Milosevic

== See also ==
- Hong Kong Football Association
- Hong Kong First Division League
