= Giovanni Orfei =

Italian footballer

Personal information
- Date of birth: 31 January 1976 (age 50)
- Place of birth: Tivoli, Italy
- Height: 1.82 m (5 ft 11 1/2 in)
- Position: Defender

Youth career
- Lodigiani

Senior career*
Years	Team	Apps	(Gls)
1993–1994	Lodigiani	1	(0)
1994–1995	Lazio	0	(0)
1995–1996	Reggiana	21	(0)
1996–1997	Ascoli	17	(0)
1996–1997	Reggiana	1	(0)
1997–1998	Palermo	24	(1)
1998–2000	Reggiana	44	(5)
2000–2001	Catania	25	(3)
2001–2002	Modena	18	(1)
2002–2005	Venezia	68	(0)
2005	→ Salernitana (loan)	15	(0)
2005–2007	Torino	24	(0)
2007	Salernitana	9	(0)
2007–2008	Hellas Verona	27	(2)
2009–2012	Sambonifacese	78	(2)
- * Club domestic league appearances and goals

Giovanni Orfei (born 31 January 1976) is an Italian football coach and former professional footballer who played as a defender.

== Club career ==
Orfei started his career at Lodigiani, where he made his professional debut in 1993–94 Serie C1.

Orfei and Ivano Della Morte were signed by Reggiana from Lazio in mid-1997. Goalkeeper Marco Ballotta also moved to opposite direction in the same window.

In January 2005 Orfei was signed by Salernitana on a temporary deal.

He was signed by Hellas Verona during the mid-2007 transfer market.

== Coaching career ==
Orfei was the coach of Hellas Verona F.C.'s under-16 team, known as "Allievi B", in 2013–14 season. He also coached the same team but composed of born 1997 players in 2012–13 season.
