= Giordano Caini =

Italian footballer

Personal information
- Date of birth: 28 March 1969 (age 57)
- Place of birth: Brescia, Italy
- Height: 1.78 m (5 ft 10 in)
- Position: Left-back

Youth career
- Brescia

Senior career*
Years	Team	Apps	(Gls)
1988–1989	Brescia	0	(0)
1988–1989	→ Pro Sesto (loan)	27	(1)
1989–1990	Centese	32	(1)
1990–1991	Pro Sesto	31	(0)
1991–1992	Catania	28	(0)
1992–1995	Foggia	76	(1)
1995–1998	Reggiana	71	(0)
1998–2000	Piacenza	7	(0)
2000–2001	Rodengo Saiano	17	(1)
2001–2007	Salò	124	(0)
Total		413	(4)

Managerial career
- 2007–2009: Salò (assistant)
- 2009–2011: Feralpisalò (assistant)
- * Club domestic league appearances and goals

Giordano Caini (born 28 March 1969) is an Italian former professional footballer who played as a left-back.

== Career ==
Revealed by Brescia, Caini only played for the club in Coppa Italia matches, being loaned to Pro Sesto in the 1988–89 season. He played in Serie A for Foggia, Reggiana and Piacenza, in addition to playing for Salò, a team from the Lombardy region, for six seasons before retiring. Caini became AC Salò assistant coach shortly after his playing career finished.

== Honours ==
Salò

- Coppa Italia Dilettanti: 2003–04
- Eccellenza: 2003–04 (Lombardia, group C)
