= Ettore Gandini =

Italian footballer (born 1969)

Ettore Gandini (born 1 May 1969 in Varese) is a retired Italian footballer who played as a goalkeeper.

== Career ==
Gandini played for the Varese youth teams and began to play with the senior team in Serie C2, with whom he won the league title in the 1989–90 season. In 1993, he was bought by Reggiana and loaned out to Barletta and Crevalcore. In 1995, he was the reserve of Reggiana's starting goalkeeper Marco Ballotta and the team obtained promotion to Serie A. The subsequent season he continued to be a reserve but managed to play one Serie A match, against Fiorentina. He ended his career in Serie C and Eccellenza.

His career was well documented in Chapter 8 – Seven Minutes in Serie A, in the 2006 book 'Forza Italia - The Fall and Rise of Italian Football' by Irish journalist Paddy Agnew. The chapter particularly concentrates on his struggles to gain a first team place throughout his career from Serie C all the way up to Serie A and how he was unable to make it into the first team, despite the fact that the first team goal keeper Marco Ballotta performed poorly throughout the season and at one point was even linked with a move to Lazio, which confirmed Gandini's place as the first team keeper. Unfortunately the move fell through and Ballotta kept his place as the first team goalkeeper. In addition to this, when they were mathematically relegated, the club actually began giving youth team players from Conigliano Veneto, where the son of Reggiana's managing director worked, a chance to play. The club would receive money for this in exchange. During the famous game with Fiorentina, in which Batistuta and Robbiatti had put the latter team ahead 3–0 and sealed the game, the then Reggianna manager Francesco Oddo decided to bring on some substitutes. His final substitute was a young reserve, at which point Italian Veteran and former Napoli player Fernando De Napoli shouted at the manager and demanded that Gandini be brought on. He eventually got to play 7 minutes in Serie A, when Oddo changed his mind. The following week, during the final game of the season, however he was once again relegated to the bench, with Ballotta taking the first team place. He eventually quit football and concentrated on his career in golf learning.

== Career statistics ==
- 1988–1993 Varese 73 (-58)
- 1993 Reggiana 0 (0)
- 1993–1994 → Barletta 24 (-19)
- 1994–1995 → Crevalcore 31 (-40)
- 1995–1997 Reggiana 1 (0)
- 1997–1998 Novara 14 (-14)
- 1998–1999 Fiorenzuola 8 (-13)
- 2000–2001 Viggiù 25 (-?)
- 2001–2002 Real Saronno 5 (-?)
