= Pietro Strada =

Italian footballer

Personal information
- Full name: Pietro Marco Strada
- Date of birth: 11 December 1969 (age 56)
- Place of birth: Brescia, Italy
- Height: 1.76 m (5 ft 9 in)
- Positions: Midfielder; forward

Senior career*
Years	Team	Apps	(Gls)
1986–1987	Ospitaletto	6	(0)
1987–1988	Bologna	5	(0)
1988–1990	Ospitaletto	56	(14)
1990–1991	Siracusa	1	(0)
1991–1992	Ospitaletto	29	(8)
1992–1995	Salernitana	87	(13)
1995–1996	Reggiana	30	(8)
1996–1998	Parma	36	(4)
1998–1999	Perugia	6	(0)
1999–2000	Genoa	12	(2)
2000–2001	Cosenza	29	(2)
2002	Sampdoria	7	(0)
2002–2004	Lumezzane	52	(8)
2004–2005	Cremonese	29	(6)
2005–2006	Brescia	14	(1)
2006–2007	Lumezzane	25	(2)
- * Club domestic league appearances and goals

Pietro Marco Strada (born 11 December 1969) is an Italian retired footballer who played as a midfielder or forward.

== Career ==
Pietro played for Reggiana during the 1995–96 season clinching the promotion to 1996–97 Serie A with Carlo Ancelotti as his manager. Before the 1998 FIFA World Cup, Strada was called up for a friendly against Paraguay and was shortlisted for the World Cup squad but could not participate in either due to injury.
