= Leonardo Colucci =

Italian football player and manager (born 1972)

Personal information
- Date of birth: 29 December 1972 (age 53)
- Place of birth: Cerignola, Italy
- Height: 1.75 m (5 ft 9 in)
- Position: Midfielder

Youth career
- 1988–1993: Cerignola

Senior career*
Years	Team	Apps	(Gls)
1993–1995	Siracusa	40	(7)
1995	Lazio	2	(1)
1995–1996	Reggiana	35	(3)
1996–2002	Verona	147	(10)
2002–2006	Bologna	112	(1)
2006–2007	Cagliari	26	(1)
2007–2009	Cremonese	33	(0)
2009–2011	Modena	55	(0)
Total		450	(23)

Managerial career
- 2011–2012: Cesena (assistant)
- 2013–2016: Bologna Primavera
- 2016–2017: Reggiana
- 2017–2018: Pordenone
- 2018–2019: Vis Pesaro
- 2020–2021: Ravenna
- 2021–2022: Picerno
- 2022–2023: Juve Stabia
- 2023–2024: SPAL
- * Club domestic league appearances and goals

Leonardo Colucci (born 29 December 1972) is an Italian football coach and former player, who played as a midfielder.

== Playing career ==
=== Early career ===
Colucci started his career at his hometown club Cerignola, where he played in the regional Italian league divisions (Serie D and Interregionale). In the 1993–94 season, he signed for Siracusa of Serie C1. His performances for the club led to him being signed by Serie A side Lazio halfway through the 1994–95 season; he scored the winning and only goal in the last match of the season, against Brescia.

In the 1995–96 season, he left for Reggiana of Serie B. He played 35 league matches out of a possible 38.

=== Verona ===
In the next season, he played for Verona of Serie A. After the club was relegated in 1997, he won the Serie B Champion in 1999, helping the team return to Serie A.

He spent another three seasons in Serie A with Verona until they were relegated again in 2002.

=== Bologna ===
In July 2002, he left for Bologna. He played 85 league matches over three Serie A seasons and followed the team as they were relegated to Serie B in 2005.

=== Late career ===
In August 2006, he joined Cagliari of Serie A. He made 23 starts for the club and 26 league appearances overall. In the summer of 2007, he left for Cremonese of Serie C1.

In September 2009, he joined Modena of Serie B on a free transfer. He remained with the club until 2011, when he retired from professional football to pursue a coaching career.

== Coaching career ==
On 14 February 2018, he was fired as the coach of Serie C club Pordenone.

On 17 November 2020, he was hired by Serie C club Ravenna.

On 15 November 2021, he was announced as the new head coach of Serie C club Picerno. After guiding them to a spot in the promotion playoff, where they were eliminated in the first round, on 14 May 2022 Picerno announced they would not extend Colucci's contract with the club.

In June 2022, Colucci agreed a deal with Serie C club Juve Stabia as their new head coach. He resigned on 27 January 2023 for personal reasons. On 3 October 2023, Colucci was announced as the new head coach of Serie C club SPAL, signing a contract until the end of the season. He was dismissed on 4 February 2024, leaving SPAL deep in the relegation zone.

== Managerial statistics ==
Managerial record by team and tenure
Team	From	To	Record				
Team	From	To	P	W	D	L	Win %
Bologna Primavera	July 2013	June 2016	92	33	19	40	35.9
Reggiana	June 2016	January 2017	26	13	4	9	50.0
Pordenone	June 2017	February 2018	29	11	9	9	37.9
Vis Pesaro	July 2018	July 2019	40	9	16	15	22.5
Ravenna	November 2020	June 2021	29	3	12	14	10.3
Picerno	November 2021	May 2022	24	10	5	9	41.7
Juve Stabia	June 2022	January 2023	25	10	6	9	40.0
SPAL	October 2023	February 2024	18	3	9	6	16.7
Total			283	92	80	111	32.5

== Honours ==
=== Player ===
Verona

- Serie B: 1998–99
