= Marco Di Loreto =

Italian former footballer turned manager

Personal information
- Date of birth: 28 September 1974 (age 52)
- Place of birth: Terni, Italy
- Height: 1.86 m (6 ft 1 in)
- Position: Central defender

Senior career*
Years	Team	Apps	(Gls)
1991–1995	Narnese	77+	(3+)
1995–2000	Arezzo	120	(4)
2000	Viterbese	15	(0)
2000–2005	Perugia	166	(11)
2005–2006	Fiorentina	20	(0)
2006–2009	Torino	75	(0)
Total		473+	(18+)

Managerial career
- 2013: Castel Rigone
- * Club domestic league appearances and goals

Marco Di Loreto (born 28 September 1974) is an Italian former footballer turned manager. He has played over 200 matches at Italian Serie A since his debut at age 26.

He has been the former head coach of Lega Pro Seconda Divisione club Castel Rigone.

== Coaching career ==
In March 2011 he was appointed as the coach of Berretti youth team of Foligno Calcio. In July 2011, he obtained a UEFA A License, making him eligible to coach Lega Pro teams.

He then served as youth coach at Perugia for the 2012–13 season.

He has been the head coach of Castel Rigone in the Lega Pro Seconda Divisione league in the 2013–14 season until the end of October 2013.

== Honours ==
Arezzo

- Serie D: 1996

Perugia

- UEFA Intertoto Cup: 2003
