= Roberto Paci =

Italian association football player

Personal information
- Full name: Roberto Paci
- Date of birth: July 18, 1964 (age 62)
- Place of birth: Bologna, Italy
- Height: 1.81 m (5 ft 11 1/2 in)
- Position: Centre-forward

Youth career
- 1981–1982: Parma

Senior career*
Years	Team	Apps	(Gls)
1982–1983	US Alessandria	0	(0)
1983–1984	Parma	0	(0)
1983–1984	Lucchese	0	(0)
1984–1985	Asti	0	(0)
1985–1986	Parma	0	(0)
1986–1987	Ancona	0	(0)
1987–1988	Prato	0	(0)
1988–2000	Lucchese	294	(109)
1995	Reggiana	10	(3)
2000–2001	Viterbese	13	(1)
- * Club domestic league appearances and goals

Roberto Paci (born 18 July 1964) is an Italian former footballer who played as a centre-forward. He has scored over 100 goals for Lucchese and made over 300 appearances in his career. He is regarded as one of Lucchese's greatest players of all time.

== Career ==
On 24 August 1983, Paci made his debut for Parma in the Coppa Italia at the age of 19. He made his first appearance for Lucchese on 2 September 1990.

He scored the first goal in his career for Lucchese in the Serie B game against Reggiana on 16 September 1990.

On 13 November 1994, at the age of 30, Paci scored the first hat-trick of his career, for Lucchese scoring two penalties in a 5-1 win against Como.

In March 1998, he scored his 100th goal in the Serie B, and made his 250th appearance one month later. On 9 January 2000, Paci made his 300th appearance for Lucchese against Siena.

At the age of 38, he retired from football. He later started a restaurant in Porto Cervo.

== Playing style ==
Paci was right-footed. He was known for his shooting and acrobatic skills in the penalty box.

== Career statistics ==
=== Club ===
Appearances and goals by club, season and competition
Club	Season	League			Coppa Italia		Total	
Club	Season	Division	Apps	Goals	Apps	Goals	Apps	Goals
Alessandria	1982–1983	Serie C	0	0	0	0	0	0
Parma	1983–1984	Serie C	0	0	2	0	2	0
Parma	1985–1986	Serie C	0	0	3	0	3	0
Parma	Total		0	0	5	0	5	0
Lucchese	1983–1984	Serie C	0	0	0	0	0	0
Lucchese	1988–1989	Serie C	0	0	0	0	0	0
Lucchese	1989–1990	Serie C	0	0	0	0	0	0
Lucchese	1990–1991	Serie B	37	13	1	0	38	13
Lucchese	1991–1992	Serie B	35	9	4	0	39	9
Lucchese	1992–1993	Serie B	35	14	0	0	35	14
Lucchese	1993–1994	Serie B	17	7	2	1	19	8
Lucchese	1994–1995	Serie B	35	18	1	0	36	18
Lucchese	1995–1996	Serie B	20	7	0	0	20	7
Lucchese	1996–1997	Serie B	33	16	2	0	35	16
Lucchese	1997–1998	Serie B	35	16	2	0	37	16
Lucchese	1998–1999	Serie B	28	5	2	2	30	7
Lucchese	1999–2000	Serie C	19	4	0	0	19	4
Lucchese	Total		294	109	14	3	308	112
Asti	1984–1985	Serie C	0	0	0	0	0	0
Ancona	1986–1987	Serie C	0	0	0	0	0	0
Prato	1987–1988	Serie C	0	0	0	0	0	0
Reggiana	1995–1996	Serie B	10	3	3	1	0	0
Viterbese	2000–2001	Serie C	13	1	3	0	0	0
Career total			317	113	20	4	308	112
