= Michele Tardioli =

Italian footballer and coach

Personal information
- Full name: Michele Tardioli
- Date of birth: 7 November 1970 (age 55)
- Place of birth: Foligno, Italy
- Height: 1.76 m (5 ft 9 in)
- Position: Goalkeeper

Senior career*
Years	Team	Apps	(Gls)
1988–1990	Petrignano	?	(?)
1990–1993	Umbertide	?	(?)
1993–1997	Sansepolcro	?	(?)
1997–2000	Arezzo	101	(0)
2000–2004	Perugia	17	(0)
2004–2005	Sangiovannese	33	(0)
2005–2007	Pescara	26	(0)
2007–2008	Sansovino	16	(0)
2008–2010	Cesena	6	(0)
Total		199	(0)

Managerial career
- 2011: Bologna (technique coach)
- 2015: Perugia (assistant)
- 2015–2016: Vicenza (assistant)
- 2017–2018: Sansepolcro
- * Club domestic league appearances and goals

Michele Tardioli (born 7 November 1970) is an Italian former footballer who played as a goalkeeper and current football coach. He spent 18 seasons at clubs of the Province of Perugia and the Province of Arezzo.

== Career ==
Born in Foligno, the Province of Perugia, Umbria, Tardioli started his career at Serie D and played 9 seasons. He first played for Petrignano and Umbertide which both located in the Province of Perugia, then left for Tuscany side Sansepolcro, which is located in Sansepolcro, the Province of Arezzo, border the Province of Perugia. From 1994 to 97, he played 88 league matches. In 1997, he was signed by Serie C2 side Arezzo which he won the league promotion playoffs and played 2 more seasons as a regular starter. In 2000, he was signed by hometown club, Serie A side Perugia as backup keeper. In the first 2 seasons he was the backup of Andrea Mazzantini then Óscar Córdoba in January 2002 and Željko Kalac In July 2002. In the last season, he played 5 leagues matches and 3 Coppa Italia matches, then the coach preferred Stefano Pardini in the league and the Cup after the unavailable of Kalac. After Perugia relegated in 2004, both Pardini and Tardioli left the club and Tardioli was signed by Serie C1 side Sangiovannese, which is located in the Province of Arezzo.

In July 2005, he was signed by Serie B side Pescara, as the first time left Umbria and Tuscany. He worked as Vlada Avramov's backup. In the next season, he was the backup of Vitangelo Spadavecchia, then Ciro Polito in January 2007.

In June 2007, he was released by Pescara, and in December signed with Serie C2 side Sansovino which also located in the Province of Arezzo. He became the regular starter ahead Antonio Saviano. But Tardioli did not avoided the relegation.

In July 2008, he was signed by Emilia–Romagna side Cesena of Lega Pro Prima Divisione as their backup keeper Alessio Sarti was injured and the first choice Artur returned to Siena from loan. He worked as backup of youth product of Nicola Ravaglia, then as Francesco Antonioli's backup.

== Honours ==
Perugia

- UEFA Intertoto Cup: 2003

Cesena

- Lega Pro Prima Divisione: 2009
