= Antonio Rizzolo =

Italian footballer and manager (born 1969)

Personal information
- Date of birth: 22 April 1969 (age 57)
- Place of birth: Orvieto, Italy
- Height: 1.78 m (5 ft 10 in)
- Position: Forward

Senior career*
| Years | Team | Apps | (Gls) |
| 1986–1989 | Lazio | 42 | (6) |
| 1989–1990 | Pescara | 32 | (6) |
| 1990 | Atalanta | 1 | (0) |
| 1990–1991 | Padova | 14 | (2) |
| 1991–1995 | Palermo | 75 | (20) |
| 1992–1993 | → Lecce (loan) | 30 | (9) |
| 1995–1996 | Reggiana | 13 | (3) |
| 1996–1997 | Ascoli | 29 | (2) |
| 1997–1998 | Ternana | 18 | (2) |
| 1998–1999 | Albacete | 4 | (0) |
| 1999 | Avellino | 11 | (2) |
| 1999–2000 | Sestrese | 0 | (0) |
| 2000–2001 | Lecco | 17 | (6) |
| 2001 | Pisa | 4 | (0) |
| 2001–2002 | Latina | 16 | (3) |
| 2002–2003 | Cisco Collatino | 12 | (1) |
| 2003 | Monterotondo | 10 | (1) |
| Total | | 328 | (63) |

International career
| 1988–1989 | Italy U21 | 7 | (1) |

Managerial career
- 2010–2011: Città di Castello
- * Club domestic league appearances and goals

Antonio Rizzolo (born 22 April 1969) is an Italian football manager and former professional player.

== Career ==
Born in Orvieto, Rizzolo played as a forward in Italy and Spain for Lazio, Pescara, Atalanta, Padova, Palermo, Lecce, Reggiana, Ascoli, Ternana, Albacete, Avellino, Sestrese, Lecco, Pisa, Latina, Cisco Collatino and Monterotondo.

He also made 7 appearances for the Italian under-21 national team, scoring 1 goal. He also participated at the 1987 FIFA World Youth Championship.

He was manager of Città di Castello between 2010 and 2011.
