= Michele Pietranera =

Italian footballer

Personal information
- Date of birth: 29 July 1974 (age 52)
- Place of birth: Parma, Italy
- Height: 1.81 m (5 ft 11 in)
- Position: Striker

Senior career*
| Years | Team | Apps | (Gls) |
| 1993–1994 | Reggiana | 7 | (0) |
| 1994–1995 | Crevalcore | 29 | (16) |
| 1995–1996 | Reggiana | 25 | (5) |
| 1996 | Cosenza | 2 | (0) |
| 1996–1997 | Monza | 37 | (7) |
| 1997–1998 | Ravenna | 16 | (2) |
| 1998–1999 | Modena | 33 | (3) |
| 2000 | Foggia | 11 | (2) |
| 2000 | Catania | 1 | (0) |
| 2000–2003 | Padova | 64 | (25) |
| 2003–2005 | San Marino | 57 | (23) |
| 2005–2006 | Pavia | 8 | (0) |
| 2006–2007 | Portosummaga | 27 | (7) |
| 2007–2008 | Rovigo | 19 | (3) |
| 2008–2013 | Crociati Noceto | 54 | (17) |
- * Club domestic league appearances and goals

Michele Pietranera (born 29 July 1974) is an Italian former professional football player.

He played 7 games in the Serie A in the 1993–94 season for A.C. Reggiana 1919.
