= Dario Hübner =

Italian footballer (born 1967)

Personal information
- Date of birth: 28 April 1967 (age 59)
- Place of birth: Muggia, Italy
- Height: 1.84 m (6 ft 0 in)
- Position: Forward

Senior career*
Years	Team	Apps	(Gls)
1987–1988	Pievigina	25	(10)
1988–1989	Pergocrema	30	(11)
1989–1992	Fano	88	(25)
1992–1997	Cesena	166	(74)
1997–2001	Brescia	129	(75)
2001–2003	Piacenza	60	(38)
2003	Ancona	9	(0)
2003–2004	Perugia	13	(3)
2004–2005	Mantova	23	(7)
2005	Calcio Chiari	7	(9)
2005–2006	Rodengo Saiano	18	(9)
2006–2009	Cortefranca	64	(58)
2009–2010	ASD Castel Mella	14	(16)
2010–2011	Cavenago	6	(2)
Total		646	(337)
- * Club domestic league appearances and goals

Dario Hübner (Italian pronunciation: [ˈdaːrjo ˈubner]; German: [ˈhyːbnɐ]; born 28 April 1967) is an Italian former professional footballer. Nicknamed Il Bisonte ("The Bison"), he scored over 300 goals throughout his career, only playing in the higher divisions towards the end of his career. Hübner became the oldest player to win the Serie A top scorer award, which he managed during the 2001–02 Serie A season at the age of 35; this record was later broken by Luca Toni in 2015, who won the award at the age of 38.

An opportunistic forward with an eye for goal, and an accurate finisher (with both his head and feet) and penalty taker, he was, however, questioned for his work-rate and behaviour at times. 38 of Hübner's career goals came from penalties, whilst he was sent off ten times throughout his career, also receiving 36 yellow cards.

== Career ==
Born in Muggia, Province of Trieste, Hübner started his career in 1987–88 at Pievigina, in Interregionale, scoring ten goals. He later also played in Pergocrema (1988–89), Fano (1989–92) in Serie C, and Cesena (1992–97), in Serie B.

Following Cesena's relegation to Serie C in 1997, Hübner moved to newly promoted Serie A side Brescia, making his debut in the top Italian division in his thirties. On his debut, he scored his first goal in Serie A, against Inter at the San Siro Stadium, from an Andrea Pirlo assist, and on his second appearance, he scored a hat-trick against Sampdoria. Notwithstanding his impressive tally of 16 goals, Brescia were relegated to Serie B the following season, although he was later named the club's captain and main penalty taker, and helped the side to re-gain promotion to Serie A, scoring 21 goals during the 1999–2000 Serie B season. During the 2000–01 season, he played alongside attacking midfield playmaker Roberto Baggio, the team's new captain, under coach Carlo Mazzone, while he also faced competition as the starting striker from Igli Tare, who had a higher work-rate than Hübner. Alongside Baggio, Hübner was extremely prolific, as he scored 17 goals, helping the club to qualify for the 2001 UEFA Intertoto Cup.

After joining newly promoted Serie A club Piacenza in 2001, for 6 billion Lit., Dario consistently battled for the title of top scorer in Serie A (capocannonieri), coming 1st alongside David Trezeguet in the 2001–02 season, at 35 years old, with 24 goals, and 7th in 2002–03 season with 14 goals. Along with Igor Protti, Hübner is the only player to have won the top scoring titles in Serie A, Serie B, and Serie C1 (winning the Serie B top scorer title during the 1995–96 season with Cesena, scoring 22 goals, and the Serie C1, Girone A top scorer title during the 1991–92 season with Fano, scoring 14 goals). He is currently Piacenza's all-time Serie A top scorer.

After his time with Piacenza, he later played for Ancona during the first half of the 2003–04 Serie A season, although he was unable score or help the club avoid the relegation zone, and subsequently moved to Serie A club Perugia (2004), where he was also unsuccessful in helping the club to avoid relegation. He later moved on to play for Mantova in Serie C1 (2004–05).

In September 2005 he left professional football and signed for Chiari of Serie D, which he left two months later to join Rodengo Saiano, another Serie D club (2005–06).

In 2007–08 season, he played for Orsa Corte Franca of Eccellenza (2006–09), also later playing with Castel Mella (2009–10) and Cavenago (2010–11), before retiring and working as a coach.

== Personal life ==
Hübner is of German heritage on his father's side; his paternal grandfather was from Frankfurt, but he later moved to Trieste. However, although his grandfather was German, Dario Hübner does not speak the German language fluently.

He was nicknamed Bisonte (Bison).

In 2015, he featured in a music video, "L'estate di Hubner", by the band Toromeccanica. He was also referenced in the 2018 song "Hübner" by singer-songwriter Calcutta.

He used to be an avid smoker, smoking more than 20 cigarettes per day, even on the bench during his time at Brescia, and was also known for drinking grappa.

== Career statistics ==
Appearances and goals by club, season and competition
Club	Season	League			Cup		Other		Total	
Club	Season	Division	Apps	Goals	Apps	Goals	Apps	Goals	Apps	Goals
Cesena	1992–93	Serie B	34	10	2	1	—		36	11
Cesena	1993–94	Serie B	32	12	5	3	1 (Note: Appearance in Serie B play-offs)	1	38	16
Cesena	1994–95	Serie B	33	15	2	1	—		35	16
Cesena	1995–96	Serie B	36	22	1	0	—		37	22
Cesena	1996–97	Serie B	31	15	3	3	—		34	18
Cesena	Total		166	74	13	8	1	1	180	83
Brescia	1997–98	Serie A	30	16	1	0	—		31	16
Brescia	1998–99	Serie B	36	21	4	2	—		40	23
Brescia	1999–2000	Serie B	32	21	3	1	—		35	22
Brescia	2000–01	Serie A	31	17	8	7	—		39	24
Brescia	Total		129	75	16	10	—		145	85
Piacenza	2001–02	Serie A	33	24	1	0	—		34	24
Piacenza	2002–03	Serie A	27	14	1	1	—		28	15
Piacenza	Total		60	38	2	1	—		62	39
Ancona	2003–04	Serie A	9	0	0	0	—		9	0
Perugia	2003–04	Serie A	13	3	0	0	—		13	3
Mantova	2004–05	Serie C1	23	7	—		4 (Note: Appearance in Serie C1 play-offs)	0	27	7
Career total			400	197	31	19	5	1	436	217

== Honours ==
Fano

- Lega Pro Seconda Divisione Group C: 1989–90

Individual

- Serie A top scorer: 2001–02 (24 goals, alongside David Trezeguet)
- Serie B top scorer: 1995–96 (22 goals)
- Serie C1 top scorer: 1991–92, Girone A (14 goals)
