= Adaílton (footballer, born 1977) =

Brazilian football coach and former player

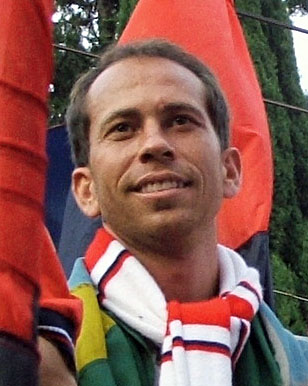
- Adaílton with Genoa in 2007

Personal information
- Full name: Adaílton Martins Bolzan
- Date of birth: 24 January 1977 (age 49)
- Place of birth: Santiago, Brazil
- Height: 1.75 m (5 ft 9 in)
- Position: Striker

Team information
- Current team: São Paulo (assistant)

Youth career
- 1987–1995: Juventude

Senior career*
Years	Team	Apps	(Gls)
1995–1996	Juventude	35	(1)
1997	Guarani	8	(5)
1997–1999	Parma	13	(2)
1998–1999	→ Paris Saint-Germain (loan)	19	(2)
1999–2006	Hellas Verona	163	(50)
2006–2007	Genoa	26	(11)
2007–2010	Bologna	87	(20)
2010–2012	Vaslui	59	(17)
2013	Juventude	7	(0)
Total		417	(108)

International career
1996–1998	Brazil U20	19	(24)

Managerial career
- 2017–2019: Virtus Verona (assistant)
- 2019: Vigor Carpaneto
- 2021: Gama (assistant)
- 2021: Gama
- 2022–2023: Juventude (assistant)
- 2023: Juventude (interim)
- 2023: Juventude (interim)
- 2023–2024: Juventude U20
- 2024–2025: Internacional (assistant)
- 2026–: São Paulo (assistant)
- * Club domestic league appearances and goals

Adaílton Martins Bolzan (born 24 January 1977), best known as Adaílton, is a Brazilian football coach and a former player who played as a striker. He is the current assistant coach of São Paulo.

Adaílton holds Italian nationality, thus he was not restricted by labour law for non-European Union citizen.

== Club career ==
Adaílton was born in Santiago, Brazil. He began his career in 1994 with Juventude before moving to Guarani.

In 1997, he joined Parma but failed to impress and as the club already had Enrico Chiesa and Hernán Crespo, it was rumored that he would leave in January 1998, after having then played only three times in Serie A, including his debut on 21 September 1997 against Piacenza Calcio when he was substituted for Crespo in the 74th minute. He started his first game on 9 November and scored the opening goal in a 2–0 win against Empoli. Following the win he did not start again until 1 February 1998 when he appeared against Bari. He started twice more in nine more league appearances following the transfer of Faustino Asprilla to the Gialloblu.

In the next season he left for Paris Saint Germain before returning in the summer of 1999 to join Serie A newcomer Hellas Verona in a co-ownership deal and was closely followed at the club by the arrival of Robert Špehar. Under Cesare Prandelli, he started to play more regularly.

Verona acquired the full rights to the player in June 2004.

In the summer of 2006, Adaílton joined Serie B side Genoa along with Giuseppe Sculli, Luciano Figueroa and Ilyos Zeytulayev as part of the club's push for promotion. In January 2007 the club also signed Marco Di Vaio, Julio César de León and Mirco Gasparetto. Adaílton was paired with Di Vaio as the club's strike force in January, and helped Genoa to finish third and promotion to Serie A. For the following season Genoa signed Marco Borriello and Adaílton was sold to Serie B side Bologna on 31 August 2007. where he won promotion to Serie A again.

For the 2008–09 season, Bologna signed Di Vaio, and paired him with Adaílton again, with Di Vaio ending the season as the team's top scorer and helping the club avoid relegation to Serie B.

=== Vaslui ===
==== 2010–2011 ====
On 3 August 2010, Adaílton signed a two-year contract with Liga I club FC Vaslui. He made his competitive debut for Vaslui on 14 August, in a 2–1 home win against FC Brașov. On 13 September, he scored his first Vaslui goals, netting twice in the emphatic 4–0 home league win over Oţelul Galaţi. On 25 September, he scored his first three-points goal, netting the winning goal against Gloria Bistriţa. On 15 October, Adaílton scored two more goals, in a 5–3 home victory over CFR Cluj Adaílton had worn the number 14 during the first half of the season, but switched during the winter break to the number 10 shirt. On 7 March 2011, he scored his sixth league goal for Vaslui, in a 2–0 home victory against Universitatea Cluj. On 19 March, he scored the equalizer from a 16-yard free kick, in a 1–1 draw against Steaua București. The next round, he repeated the performance, in a 2–0 home victory against Unirea Urziceni, scoring from a 20-yard free kick. At the end of the season, the 11 goals scored and the 11 assists provided for his teammates were enough for Adaílton to be awarded the Vaslui Player of the Year award.

==== 2011–2012 ====
At the beginning of the 2011–12 season, due to the major squad problems, Adaílton began playing as a right winger. His new role helped him to provide three assists for his teammates in the 3–0 victory against Concordia Chiajna. However, one day later Viorel Hizo announced that Adaílton will not play in the UEFA Europa League play-off against Sparta Prague, due to an injury suffered with Concordia. On 11 September, he provided two more assists in the 3–1 home league win against Dinamo București. Four days later, he assisted Wesley's equalizer in the first match from the group stages of the UEFA Europa League against Lazio; the game ended in a 2–2 draw. On 3 October, he scored twice against CS Mioveni, ending a twelve Liga I matches goalless strike. Following Gabriel Cânu's long-term injury, and Wesley's red card received for hitting an opponent, Adaílton became captain for the Europa League matches. On 22 December, Adaílton finished second on the vote for Gazeta Sporturilor's Liga I Foreign Footballer of the Year Award, behind teammate Wesley.

On 16 June 2012, Adaílton decided to retire from professional football, in order to be with his family. He announced that he might return to Vaslui, not as a football player but as a member from the technical staff.

== International career ==
Adaílton was the top goalscorer and winner of the Golden Shoe with Brazil at the 1997 FIFA World Youth Championship. His record of 6 goals in a single match stood until 2019, when it was beaten by Erling Haaland with 9.

== Coaching career ==
On 7 October 2019, he left Italian Serie D club Vigor Carpaneto by mutual consent. Adaílton currently works as an assistant coach on Roger Machado's staff.

== Career statistics ==
=== Club ===
Appearances and goals by club, season and competition
Club	Season	League			National cup (Note: Includes Copa do Brasil, Coppa Italia, Coupe de France, Cupa României.)		League cup (Note: Includes Coupe de la Ligue.)		Continental		Other		Total	
Club	Season	Division	Apps	Goals	Apps	Goals	Apps	Goals	Apps	Goals	Apps	Goals	Apps	Goals
Juventude	1995	Série A	19	1					–		–		19	1
Juventude	1996	Série A	16	0					–		–		16	0
Juventude	Total		35	1			0	0	0	0	0	0	35	1
Guarani	1997	Série A	8	5					–		–		8	5
Parma	1997–98	Serie A	13	2	6	1	–		2	1	–		21	4
Paris Saint-Germain	1998–99	Ligue 1	19	2	2	2	3	0	1	0	–		25	4
Hellas Verona	1999–00	Serie A	28	7	1	0	–		–		–		29	7
Hellas Verona	2000–01	Serie A	18	4	2	1	–		–		2 (Note: Appearances in Serie A relegation play-off)	0	22	5
Hellas Verona	2001–02	Serie A	3	1	0	0	–		–		–		3	1
Hellas Verona	2002–03	Serie B	23	5	2	0	–		–		–		25	5
Hellas Verona	2003–04	Serie B	23	9	1	0	–		–		–		24	9
Hellas Verona	2004–05	Serie B	29	9	3	0	–		–		–		32	9
Hellas Verona	2005–06	Serie B	39	15	2	1	–		–		–		41	16
Hellas Verona	Total		163	50	11	2	0	0	0	0	2	0	176	52
Genoa	2006–07	Serie B	26	11	4	2	–		–		–		30	13
Bologna	2007–08	Serie B	32	8	0	0	–		–		–		32	8
Bologna	2008–09	Serie A	24	1	2	1	–		–		–		26	2
Bologna	2009–10	Serie A	31	11	1	0	–		–		–		32	11
Bologna	Total		87	20	3	1	0	0	0	0	0	0	90	21
Vaslui	2010–11	Liga I	29	11	1	0	–		0	0	–		30	11
Vaslui	2011–12	Liga I	30	6	4	2	–		8	0	–		42	8
Vaslui	Total		59	17	5	2	–		8	0	0	0	72	19
Career total			410	108	31	12	3	0	11	1	2	0	458	121

== Honours ==
Bologna

- Serie B runner-up: 2007–08

FC Vaslui

- Liga I runner-up: 2011–12

Juventude

- Serie D runner-up: 2013

Individual

- FIFA World Youth Championship Golden Shoe: 1997
- FC Vaslui Player of the Season: 2010–11
