= 1996–97 Serie C1 =

Italian football league season

The 1996–97 Serie C1 was the 19th season of Serie C1, the third tier of Italian football, which is now known as Serie C.

== Group A (North) ==
    Team                    Points
 1. TREVISO                    60                Promoted to Serie B
----------------------------------
 2. Brescello                  59
 3. Carpi                      55
 4. Saronno                    55
 5. MONZA                      54                Promoted to Serie B after play off
----------------------------------
 6. Prato                      54
 7. Carrarese                  46
 8. Alessandria                46
 9. Siena                      44
10. Montevarchi                44
11. Como                       43
12. Fiorenzuola                42
13. Modena                     37 (1)
----------------------------------
14. Pistoiese                  34
15. Spal                       33                Relegated to Serie C2 after play out
16. Alzano                     32
17. Novara                     31                Relegated to Serie C2 after play out
----------------------------------
18. Spezia                     23                Relegated to Serie C2

(1) 4 points less

== Group B (South) ==
    Team                    Points
 1. FIDELIS ANDRIA             64                Promoted to Serie B
----------------------------------
 2. ANCONA                     57                Promoted to Serie B after play off
 3. Savoia                     52
 4. Atletico Catania           49
 5. Giulianova                 49
----------------------------------
 6. Acireale                   45
 7. Casarano                   43
 8. Ascoli                     43
 9. Ischia Isolaverde          43
10. Lodigiani                  42
11. Juve Stabia                42
12. Avellino                   42
13. Gualdo                     41
----------------------------------
14. Trapani                    41                Relegated to Serie C2 after play out
15. Nocerina                   41
16. Fermana                    41
17. Sora                       38                Relegated to Serie C2 after play out
----------------------------------
18. Avezzano                   29                Relegated to Serie C2

== Play-off ==
- Gir. A:
  - Monza-Brescello 2–1; 1–0
  - Saronno-Carpi 1–0; 0–3
    - Monza-Carpi 3–2
- Gir. B:
  - Giulianova-Ancona 1-1; 1–2
  - Atletico Catania-Savoia 0-0; 0–1
    - Ancona-Savoia 1–0

== Play-out ==
- Girone A
  - Novara-Pistoiese 0-0; 1–1
  - Alzano-Spal 0-0; 2–1
- Girone B
  - Sora-Nocerina 2–1; 1–2
  - Trapani-Fermana 0-0; 1–1

== References and sources ==
- Almanacco Illustrato del Calcio - La Storia 1898-2004, Panini Edizioni, Modena, September 2005

Specific
