= Marco Ballotta =

Italian footballer (born 1964)

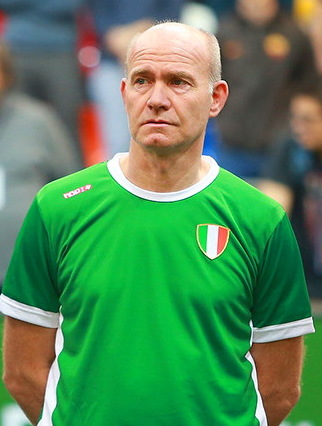
- Ballotta in 2018

Personal information
- Date of birth: 3 April 1964 (age 62)
- Place of birth: Casalecchio di Reno, Italy
- Height: 1.80 m (5 ft 11 in)
- Position: Goalkeeper

Youth career
- 1981–1982: Bologna

Senior career*
Years	Team	Apps	(Gls)
1982–1984	San Lazzaro	22	(0)
1984–1990	Modena	188	(0)
1991	Cesena	5	(0)
1991–1994	Parma	33	(0)
1994–1995	Brescia	32	(0)
1995–1997	Reggiana	72	(0)
1997–2000	Lazio	13	(0)
2000–2001	Inter Milan	6	(0)
2001–2002	→ Modena (loan)	36	(0)
2002–2004	Modena	52	(0)
2004–2005	Treviso	35	(0)
2005–2008	Lazio	48	(0)
Total		542	(0)

Managerial career
- 2014: Castelvetro (goalkeeper coach)
- 2014: Castelvetro
- * Club domestic league appearances and goals

Marco Ballotta (born 3 April 1964) is an Italian former professional footballer who played as a goalkeeper.

His professional career spanned a quarter of a century, but he was never capped for the Italy national team. He also held the distinction of being the oldest player ever to appear in both the Serie A and the Champions League.

During 15 Serie A seasons, Ballotta appeared in 138 games for six clubs, mainly Modena and Lazio.

== Career ==
=== Early years ===
Born in Casalecchio di Reno, Emilia Romagna, Ballotta emerged through Bologna's youth system before starting out as a senior with hometown club Boca San Lazzaro. In the 1984 summer he joined Modena, where he remained for the next six years. In January 1991 he transferred to Cesena, but only stayed for six months before being purchased by Parma also in Serie A.

Ballotta was in top form during 1992–93, as Parma won the UEFA Cup Winners' Cup and finished third in the league. However, his momentum did not continue into the next season and he only made three league appearances. He did start both legs in the team's 2–1 aggregate win over AC Milan in the UEFA Super Cup, but was benched in favor of Luca Bucci for the 1993–94 Cup Winners' Cup, as Parma reached the final for the second consecutive year, only to be defeated by Arsenal.

=== Rise to success ===
Ballotta signed with Brescia in 1994, being relegated in his sole season. He then spent the following campaign in Serie B with Reggiana, achieving promotion at the first attempt. After being immediately relegated, he left for Lazio for 1997–98, initially as third-choice.

After three seasons with the Biancocelesti, Ballotta enjoyed a brief stint with Inter Milan, who acquired the player as part of Angelo Peruzzi's multi-billion lire move to Lazio. Inter claimed the transfer fee for Ballotta and Peruzzi were 7 billion and 40 billion respectively (thus 33 billion plus Ballotta), while La Gazzetta dello Sport claimed the transfer fee of Peruzzi was 35 billion plus Ballotta. During this timeframe he was also loaned to Modena, helping them gain promotion to the top flight in 2002 and subsequently signing permanently for free.

Ballotta remained at the Stadio Alberto Braglia until the club's relegation at the end of 2003–04, spending the following season with Treviso in the second tier. Despite a fourth-place finish, they were promoted in place of Genoa after the latter were demoted to Serie C1 following a match-fixing scandal, and he was once again back in the top level after rejoining Lazio as a replacement for Fabrizio Casazza as third goalkeeper.

=== Winning records and retirement ===
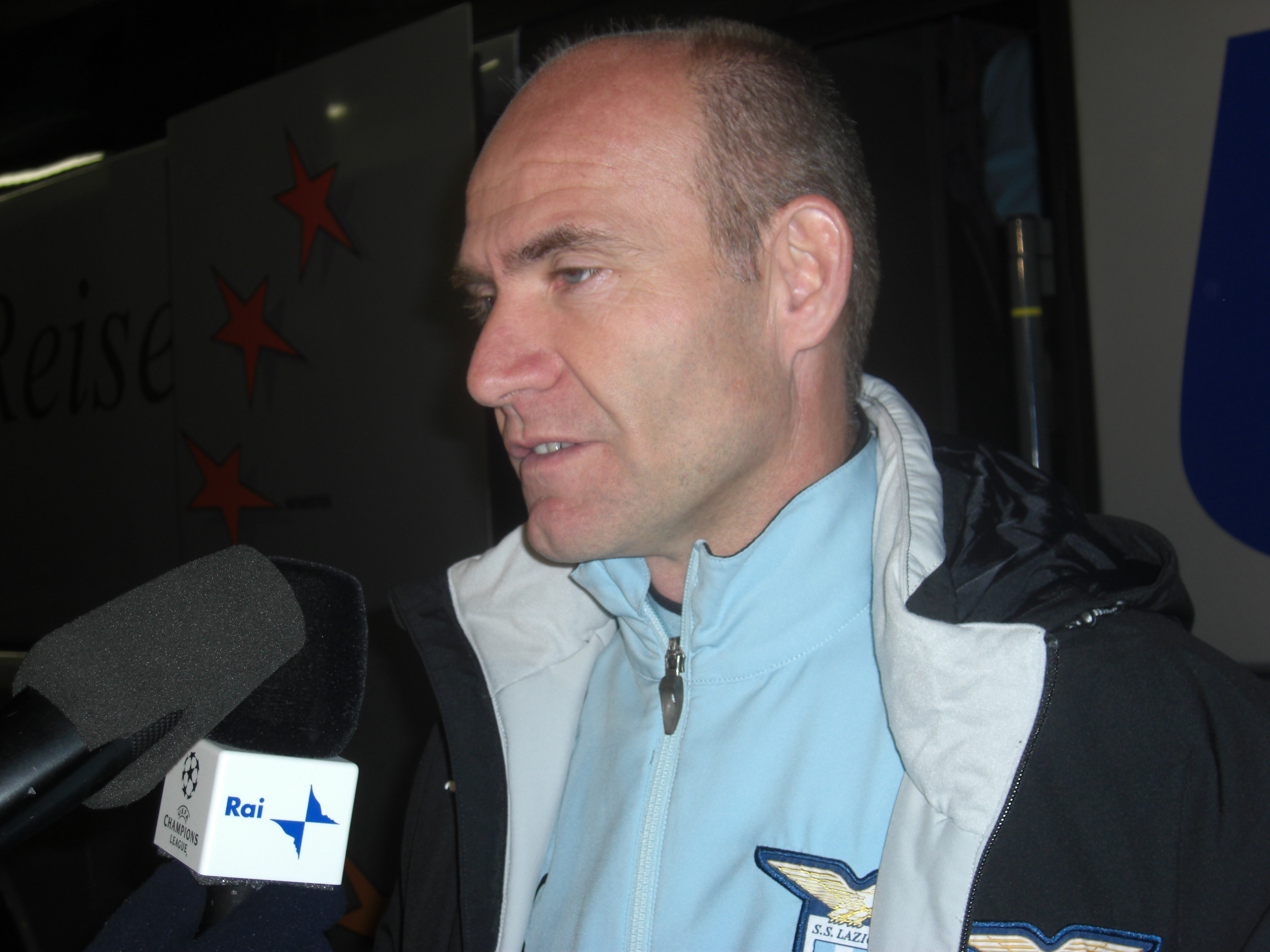
Ballotta with Lazio in 2007

Ballotta made eight starts during the 2005–06 campaign, as an injury replacement for both Peruzzi and Matteo Sereni. On 23 October 2005, he set the record as the oldest player to have played in the first division when he started in Lazio's lineup against Roma at the age of 41 years and 203 days, beating the previous record set on 7 May 1983 when Dino Zoff played his last game at the age of 41 years and 34 days.

Due to Peruzzi's ongoing injury problems the following season, Ballotta made eleven league appearances as Lazio finished third behind Inter and Roma. They subsequently clinched a berth in the UEFA Champions League.

Ballotta started the first two matches of 2007–08, until the gloves were handed to new acquisition Fernando Muslera for the next five rounds. Following the 5–1 home loss against Milan on 7 October 2007, he regained the starting spot, which he kept until the end of the season. He also started in all Champions League matches, in which he also became the oldest player ever to play in the competition during a 1–1 draw with Olympiacos on 18 September 2007, at the age of 43 years and 168 days, beating the previous record held by another Italian, Alessandro Costacurta, who was 40 years and 211 days in Milan's loss to AEK Athens on 21 November 2006.

Ballotta retired after his contract with Lazio expired at the end of the season, expressing an interest in continuing his career, before eventually signing a deal as general manager at former club Modena. This experience was however short-lived and, after just 35 days, he decided to stop working at the club.

In late 2008, Ballotta returned with Prima Categoria (eighth level) side Calcara Samoggia, but in another position: forward.

== Career statistics ==
=== Club ===
Appearances and goals by club, season and competition
Club	Season	League			Cup		Europe		Other		Total	
Club	Season	Division	Apps	Goals	Apps	Goals	Apps	Goals	Apps	Goals	Apps	Goals
Modena	1984–85	Serie C1	17	0	0	0	—		—		17	0
Modena	1985–86	Serie C1	34	0	14	0	—		—		48	0
Modena	1986–87	Serie B	23	0	5	0	—		—		28	0
Modena	1987–88	Serie B	38	0	5	0	—		—		43	0
Modena	1988–89	Serie C1	34	0	7	0	—		—		41	0
Modena	1989–90	Serie C1	34	0	1	0	—		—		35	0
Modena	1990–91	Serie B	8	0	4	0	—		—		12	0
Modena	Total		188	0	36	0	—		—		224	0
Cesena	1990–91	Serie A	5	0	—		—		—		5	0
Parma	1991–92	Serie A	1	0	7	0	—		—		5	0
Parma	1992–93	Serie A	29	0	5	0	7 (Note: Appearances in UEFA Cup Winners' Cup)	0	—		41	0
Parma	1993–94	Serie A	3	0	8	0	0	0	2 (Note: Appearances in UEFA Super Cup)	0	13	0
Parma	Total		33	0	20	0	7	0	2	0	62	0
Brescia	1994–95	Serie A	32	0	2	0	—		—		34	0
Reggiana	1995–96	Serie B	38	0	3	0	—		—		41	0
Reggiana	1996–97	Serie A	34	0	2	0	—		—		36	0
Reggiana	Total		72	0	5	0	—		—		77	0
Lazio	1997–98	Serie A	1	0	3	0	1 (Note: Appearances in UEFA Cup)	0	—		5	0
Lazio	1998–99	Serie A	3	0	1	0	1	0	—		5	0
Lazio	1999–2000	Serie A	9	0	8	0	4 (Note: Appearances in UEFA Champions League)	0	—		21	0
Lazio	Total		13	0	12	0	6	0	—		31	0
Inter Milan	2000–01	Serie A	6	0	4	0	0	0	1 (Note: Appearances in Supercoppa Italiana)	0	11	0
Modena (loan)	2001–02	Serie B	36	0	3	0	—		—		39	0
Modena	2002–03	Serie A	34	0	0	0	—		—		34	0
Modena	2003–04	Serie A	18	0	2	0	—		—		20	0
Modena	Modena total		88	0	5	0	—		—		93	0
Treviso	2004–05	Serie B	35	0	0	0	—		2 (Note: Appearances in promotion/relegation playoff)	0	37	0
Lazio	2005–06	Serie A	8	0	4	0	—		—		12	0
Lazio	2006–07	Serie A	11	0	3	0	—		—		14	0
Lazio	2007–08	Serie A	29	0	2	0	8	0	—		39	0
Lazio	Total		48	0	9	0	8	0	—		65	0
Career total			520	0	93	0	21	0	5	0	639	0

== Honours ==
Modena

- Serie C: 1985–86, 1989–90

Parma

- Coppa Italia: 1991–92
- UEFA Cup Winners' Cup: 1992–93
- UEFA Super Cup: 1993

Lazio

- Serie A: 1999–2000
- Coppa Italia: 1997–98, 1999–2000
- Supercoppa Italiana: 1998
- UEFA Cup Winners' Cup: 1998–99
- UEFA Super Cup: 1999

Records

- Serie A: Oldest player to play in a game, at 44 years and 38 days (for Lazio, vs. Genoa, 11 May 2008)
- UEFA Champions League: Oldest player to play in a game, at 43 years and 252 days (for Lazio, vs. Real Madrid, 11 December 2007)
- Oldest debutant for Inter

== See also ==
- List of goalscoring goalkeepers
