= 1995–96 Serie B =

Italian football league season

Serie B
- Season: 1995–96
- Promoted: Bologna (2nd title); Verona; Perugia; Reggiana
- Relegated: Fidelis Andria; Avellino; Ancona; Pistoiese
- Matches: 380
- Goals: 859 (2.26 per match)
- Top goalscorer: (Italy) Dario Hübner (23 goals)

Serie B 1995-96 team distribution

The Serie B 1995–96 was the sixty-fourth tournament of this competition played in Italy since its creation.

== Teams ==
Bologna, Pistoiese, Reggina and Avellino had been promoted from Serie C, while Genoa, Foggia, Reggiana and Brescia had been relegated from Serie A.

== Final classification ==
Pos	Team	Pld	W	D	L	GF	GA	GD	Pts	Promotion or relegation
1	Bologna (P, C)	38	16	17	5	42	23	+19	65	Promotion to Serie A
2	Hellas Verona (P)	38	17	12	9	50	33	+17	63	Promotion to Serie A
3	Perugia (P)	38	16	13	9	52	42	+10	61	Promotion to Serie A
4	Reggiana (P)	38	16	13	9	42	32	+10	61	Promotion to Serie A
5	Salernitana	38	15	13	10	46	32	+14	58	
6	Lucchese	38	13	15	10	45	43	+2	54	
7	Palermo	38	12	16	10	36	35	+1	52	
8	Genoa	38	14	10	14	56	52	+4	52	
9	Pescara	38	13	11	14	47	50	−3	50	
10	Cesena	38	13	10	15	50	49	+1	49	
11	Cosenza	38	11	15	12	47	51	−4	48	
12	Foggia	38	13	9	16	31	50	−19	48	
13	Venezia	38	11	15	12	34	39	−5	48	
14	Chievo	38	9	20	9	37	30	+7	47	
15	Reggina	38	11	14	13	38	46	−8	47	
16	Brescia	38	12	10	16	48	49	−1	46	
17	Fidelis Andria (R)	38	10	15	13	42	45	−3	45	Relegation to Serie C1
18	Avellino (R)	38	11	10	17	39	54	−15	43	Relegation to Serie C1
19	Ancona (R)	38	11	9	18	42	51	−9	42	Relegation to Serie C1
20	Pistoiese (R)	38	7	11	20	35	53	−18	32	Relegation to Serie C1

Source: Almanacco Illustrato del Calcio - La Storia 1898-2004, Panini Edizioni, Modena, September 2005
Rules for classification: 1) points; 2) head-to-head points; 3) head-to-head goal difference; 4) head-to-head goals scored; 5) goal difference; 6) number of goals scored.
(C) Champions; (P) Promoted; (R) Relegated

== Results ==
Home \ Away	BOL	HEL	PER	REA	SAL	LUC	PAL	GEN	PES	CES	COS	FOG	VEN	CHV	REG	BRE	FAN	AVE	ANC	PST
Bologna	—	0–0	1–0	0–0	0–0	2–0	0–0	2–1	2–1	0–0	3–2	2–0	1–1	1–0	1–1	1–0	2–1	4–0	1–1	1–1
Hellas Verona	1–1	—	0–0	0–1	1–0	0–0	0–0	2–0	3–0	6–1	3–0	1–0	2–1	1–0	1–1	2–1	0–0	2–1	3–0	2–3
Perugia	2–1	3–2	—	2–1	1–2	5–0	0–0	2–2	2–1	2–2	2–1	1–1	1–0	0–0	2–1	3–1	1–0	2–1	1–1	1–0
Reggiana	1–0	2–0	0–0	—	2–1	1–1	0–0	0–0	3–1	1–0	1–1	5–1	3–0	1–0	1–3	3–2	0–0	1–0	2–1	2–0
Salernitana	0–0	1–2	1–1	1–0	—	1–1	2–1	3–1	0–2	0–0	1–0	3–0	3–1	2–2	0–2	5–0	1–0	0–0	1–0	2–1
Lucchese	2–1	1–1	2–1	0–2	1–1	—	0–0	2–0	0–1	4–3	2–1	5–1	2–0	1–1	3–1	0–0	1–1	1–0	3–1	2–1
Palermo	1–2	2–1	0–1	0–0	2–1	2–2	—	4–0	1–1	1–1	1–1	0–0	1–0	2–1	1–0	2–0	3–2	2–1	2–0	1–0
Genoa	0–1	2–2	0–1	1–1	1–0	2–1	1–0	—	5–1	2–1	3–0	1–1	0–1	3–1	7–0	2–2	2–0	3–0	2–1	2–1
Pescara	0–0	1–0	2–2	4–1	1–1	2–1	0–0	1–0	—	3–2	1–1	3–2	2–1	0–0	2–0	2–4	5–1	1–1	0–3	1–2
Cesena	2–3	2–0	2–0	1–1	3–2	1–2	1–0	3–1	3–2	—	0–0	1–0	0–1	4–2	0–0	1–2	2–1	4–0	2–1	1–0
Cosenza	0–3	1–2	2–2	3–1	0–0	1–0	1–1	1–1	0–0	2–2	—	3–0	3–1	1–3	2–0	3–2	2–1	3–3	2–0	2–0
Foggia	0–0	2–1	1–0	3–0	1–3	0–0	1–0	2–1	1–0	1–0	1–0	—	1–0	0–0	0–0	0–5	0–1	0–1	1–0	4–0
Venezia	1–1	1–1	3–1	0–0	0–3	0–0	1–1	2–2	2–1	1–0	0–0	1–1	—	0–0	1–0	3–0	0–0	0–2	0–0	1–0
Chievo	0–0	1–2	2–4	0–0	0–0	2–2	1–1	0–1	0–0	1–0	3–0	4–0	0–0	—	2–0	2–0	1–1	3–0	1–0	1–1
Reggina	0–1	1–1	1–0	2–0	1–1	2–0	4–0	2–1	1–0	0–0	0–0	1–0	0–2	1–1	—	2–1	2–2	1–1	2–2	1–1
Brescia	1–0	1–0	1–1	0–1	1–0	1–1	0–0	2–0	1–0	0–0	4–1	0–1	1–1	0–1	1–1	—	2–2	2–0	4–0	3–2
Fidelis Andria	0–2	0–0	0–3	1–1	1–2	0–0	4–0	4–0	2–1	1–0	1–1	2–1	1–1	1–1	1–0	1–0	—	3–1	1–2	2–1
Avellino	1–0	0–1	1–1	0–3	1–0	2–0	2–3	3–3	1–2	2–1	1–2	0–0	2–1	0–0	3–0	2–1	2–1	—	0–0	2–0
Ancona	1–1	1–2	4–0	1–0	0–1	0–2	1–0	2–3	1–1	3–2	1–3	3–0	1–2	0–0	4–2	2–1	1–1	2–1	—	1–0
Pistoiese	1–1	1–2	2–1	2–0	1–1	2–0	2–1	0–0	0–1	1–2	1–1	2–3	2–3	0–0	0–2	1–1	1–1	1–1	1–0	—

Source: Almanacco Illustrato del Calcio - La Storia 1898-2004, Panini Edizioni, Modena, September 2005
Legend: Blue = home team win; Yellow = draw; Red = away team win.

== Top goalscorers ==
Rank	Player	Nat.	Club	Goals
1st	Dario Hübner	ITA	Cesena	23
2nd	Vincenzo Montella	ITA	Genoa	21
3rd	Edoardo Artistico	ITA	Ancona	20
4th	Pasquale Luiso	ITA	Avellino	19
5th	Alfredo Aglietti	ITA	Reggiana	18
5th	Marco Negri	ITA	Perugia	18
7th	Cristiano Lucarelli	ITA	Cosenza	15
7th	Maurizio Neri	ITA	Brescia	15
7th	Massimo Rastelli	ITA	Lucchese	15
10th	Antonio De Vitis	ITA	Hellas Verona	13

== Attendances ==
#	Club	Average
1	Bologna	17,661
2	Palermo	17,470
3	Salernitana	16,763
4	Hellas	13,371
5	Perugia	12,424
6	Genoa	11,229
7	Reggiana	8,714
8	Avellino	8,184
9	Foggia	8,084
10	Reggina	7,369
11	Pescara	7,360
12	Cesena	5,913
13	Brescia	5,735
14	Cosenza	5,510
15	Pistoiese	5,382
16	Chievo	5,120
17	Lucchese	4,990
18	Ancona	4,977
19	Venezia	4,707
20	Fidelis Andria	4,276
