= 1998–99 SS Lazio season =

Lazio
1998–99 season
- Owner: Sergio Cragnotti
- President: Sergio Cragnotti
- Manager: Sven-Göran Eriksson
- Stadium: Stadio Olimpico
- Serie A: 2nd
- Supercoppa Italiana: Winners
- Coppa Italia: Quarter-finals
- UEFA Cup Winners' Cup: Winners
- Top goalscorer: League: Marcelo Salas (15); All: Marcelo Salas (24)
Home colours	Away colours	Third colours

The 1998–99 season was Società Sportiva Lazio's 99th season since the club's existence and their 11th consecutive season in the top-flight of Italian football. In this season, Lazio finished second in Serie A, and won the UEFA Cup Winners' Cup and Supercoppa Italiana.

== Season review ==
Lazio kicked off the 1998–99 season by defeating Juventus 2–1 to win the Supercoppa in the pre-season, and then set a searing pace in the league thanks to the striking partnership of world transfer record signing Christian Vieri and Marcelo Salas. The pair of them together netted 27 goals, as Lazio led the way for most of the season. Twenty-year-old Yugoslav starlet Dejan Stanković also impressed by scoring on his league debut.

Milan peaked late during the season, while Lazio had a barren spell, which enabled Milan to make up the deficit. Lazio finally squandered the title lead in the penultimate match of the season, where it had to settle for a draw against Fiorentina away from home.

Following the season, Vieri left the club for Inter, accusing chairman Sergio Cragnotti of lying to him. The money from Vieri's transfer was used to bring Juan Sebastián Verón, Simone Inzaghi and Diego Simeone to Rome, moves that all proved essential when Lazio clinched the title in 2000, where those three found the net in the last game of the season.

Lazio's best moment of the 1998-99 season came when they beat Mallorca 2-1 at Villa Park in Birmingham in the 1999 UEFA Cup Winners' Cup final, following goals by Vieri and Pavel Nedvěd.

=== Kit ===
Home	Away	Third	Cup Winners' Cup

== Players ==
=== Squad information ===
Squad at end of season

Note: Flags indicate national team as defined under FIFA eligibility rules; some limited exceptions apply. Players may hold more than one non-FIFA nationality.

No.	Pos.	Nation	Player
1	GK	ITA	Luca Marchegiani
2	DF	ITA	Paolo Negro
3	DF	ITA	Stefano Lombardi
5	DF	ITA	Giuseppe Favalli
6	MF	ITA	Federico Crovari
7	MF	ITA	Attilio Lombardo
9	FW	CHI	Marcelo Salas
10	FW	ITA	Roberto Mancini
11	DF	YUG	Siniša Mihajlović
12	GK	ITA	Emanuele Concetti
13	DF	ITA	Alessandro Nesta
14	MF	POR	Sérgio Conceição
15	DF	ITA	Giuseppe Pancaro
16	MF	AUS	Paul Okon

No.	Pos.	Nation	Player
17	DF	SUI	Guerino Gottardi
18	MF	CZE	Pavel Nedvěd
19	FW	CRO	Alen Bokšić
20	MF	YUG	Dejan Stanković
21	MF	ESP	Iván de la Peña
22	GK	ITA	Marco Ballotta
24	DF	POR	Fernando Couto
25	MF	ARG	Matías Almeyda
26	MF	ITA	Roberto Baronio
29	MF	ITA	Giampiero Pinzi
31	MF	ITA	Valentino Sbaccanti
32	FW	ITA	Christian Vieri
33	DF	ITA	Stefano Di Fiordo

=== Transfers ===
In
Pos.	Name	from	Type
FW	Christian Vieri	Atletico Madrid	
FW	Marcelo Salas	River Plate	
MF	Iván de la Peña	Barcelona	
DF	Fernando Couto	Barcelona	
DF	Siniša Mihajlović	Sampdoria	
MF	Sérgio Conceição	Porto	
MF	Dejan Stanković	Crvena Zvezda	
DF	Stefano Lombardi	Genoa	
GK	Flavio Roma	Foggia	loan ended
MF	Roberto Baronio	Vicenza	loan ended
MF	Daniele Franceschini	Foggia	loan ended
MF	Marco Piovanelli	Piacenza	co-ownership ended
FW	Alessandro Iannuzzi	Lecce	loan ended
FW	Igor Protti	Napoli	loan ended
FW	Giuseppe Signori	Sampdoria	co-ownership ended

Out
Pos.	Name	To	Type
FW	Pierluigi Casiraghi	Chelsea	
DF	José Chamot	Atletico Madrid	
MF	Vladimir Jugović	Atletico Madrid	
MF	Diego Fuser	Parma	
DF	Alessandro Grandoni	Sampdoria	
MF	Daniele Franceschini	Chievo Verona	
MF	Mirko Laurentini	Siena	
MF	Marco Piovanelli	Genoa	
GK	Fernando Orsi		retired
GK	Flavio Roma	Chievo Verona	loan
FW	Giuseppe Signori	Bologna	loan

==== Autumn ====
In
Pos.	Name	from	Type

Out
Pos.	Name	To	Type
DF	Giovanni Lopez	Napoli	
FW	Igor Protti	Reggiana	
FW	Roberto Rambaudi	Genoa	
DF	Maurizio Domizzi	Livorno	loan
MF	Dario Marcolin	Blackburn Rovers	loan

==== Winter ====
In
Pos.	Name	from	Type
DF	Federico Crovari	Monza	
MF	Attilio Lombardo	Crystal Palace	

Out
Pos.	Name	To	Type
MF	Giorgio Venturin	Atletico Madrid	
FW	Alessandro Iannuzzi	A.C. Milan	

=== Left club during season ===
Note: Flags indicate national team as defined under FIFA eligibility rules; some limited exceptions apply. Players may hold more than one non-FIFA nationality.

No.	Pos.	Nation	Player
4	MF	ITA	Dario Marcolin (on loan to Blackburn Rovers)
6	DF	ITA	Giovanni Lopez (to Napoli)
7	MF	ITA	Roberto Rambaudi (to Genoa)
8	FW	ITA	Igor Protti (on loan to Reggiana)

No.	Pos.	Nation	Player
23	MF	ITA	Giorgio Venturin (to Atlético Madrid)
27	FW	ITA	Alessandro Iannuzzi (to Milan)
28	DF	ITA	Maurizio Domizzi (on loan to Livorno)
30	FW	ITA	Rosario Aquino (to Livorno)

== Competitions ==
=== Supercoppa Italiana ===
29 August 1998	Juventus	1–2	Lazio	Turin
20:30 CEST (UTC+02:00)	F. Inzaghi (red card) 68'; Del Piero 87' (pen.)	(Report)	Nedvěd 37'; Conceição 90+4'	Stadium: Stadio delle Alpi; Attendance: 16,500; Referee: Roberto Bettin

=== Serie A ===
==== League table ====
Pos	Team	Pld	W	D	L	GF	GA	GD	Pts	Qualification or relegation
1	Milan (C)	34	20	10	4	59	34	+25	70	Qualification to Champions League group stage
2	Lazio	34	20	9	5	65	31	+34	69	Qualification to Champions League group stage
3	Fiorentina	34	16	8	10	55	41	+14	56	Qualification to Champions League third qualifying round
4	Parma	34	15	10	9	55	36	+19	55	Qualification to Champions League third qualifying round
5	Roma	34	15	9	10	69	49	+20	54 (Note: ROM 7pts. JUV 5pts. UDI 4pts.)	Qualification to UEFA Cup first round

Source: Serie A, RSSSF.com, Soccerway
Rules for classification: 1) Points; 2) Head-to-head points; 3) Head-to-head goal difference; 4) Goal difference; 5) Goals scored; 6) Draw. (Note: Head-to-head record is used only after all the matches between the teams in question have been played).
(C) Champions

==== Results summary ====
Overall								Home						Away					
Pld	W	D	L	GF	GA	GD	Pts	W	D	L	GF	GA	GD	W	D	L	GF	GA	GD
34	20	9	5	65	31	+34	69	12	4	1	41	14	+27	8	5	4	24	17	+7

==== Results by round ====
Round	1	2	3	4	5	6	7	8	9	10	11	12	13	14	15	16	17	18	19	20	21	22	23	24	25	26	27	28	29	30	31	32	33	34
Ground	A	H	A	H	A	H	A	H	A	A	H	A	H	H	A	H	A	H	A	H	A	H	A	H	A	H	H	A	H	A	A	H	A	H
Result	D	D	D	W	W	D	L	W	L	L	D	W	W	W	W	W	W	W	W	W	D	W	W	W	D	W	D	L	L	W	W	W	D	W
Position	6	8	11	7	5	4	6	5	7	9	10	7	6	5	3	3	2	2	2	2	1	1	1	1	1	1	1	1	1	1	1	1	2	2

Source: Competitive matches
A = Away; H = Home; W = Win; D = Draw; L = Loss; P = Postponed; = Leader, 1999–2000 UEFA Champions League Group stage; = 1999–2000 UEFA Champions League Group stage; = 1999–2000 UEFA Champions League Qualifying round; = 1999–2000 UEFA Cup First round; = Qualification to Intertoto Cup; = 1999–2000 Serie B

==== Matches ====
13 September 1998 1	Piacenza	1–1	Lazio	Piacenza
16:00 CEST (UTC+02:00)	S. Inzaghi 87'	Report	Stanković 74'; Lombardi (red card) 86'	Stadium: Stadio Leonardo Garilli; Attendance: 14,000; Referee: Stefano Farina

20 September 1998 2	Lazio	0–0	Bari	Rome
16:00 CEST (UTC+02:00)		Report		Stadium: Stadio Olimpico; Attendance: 40,000; Referee: Gennaro Borriello

27 September 1998 3	Perugia	2–2	Lazio	Perugia
16:00 CEST (UTC+02:00)	Bucchi 4'; Nakata 65'; Olive (red card) 74'	Report	Couto 19'; R. Mancini (red card) 65'; Mihajlović 72'	Stadium: Stadio Renato Curi; Attendance: 20,000; Referee: Stefano Farina

4 October 1998 4	Lazio	2–0	Cagliari	Rome
16:00 CEST (UTC+02:00)	Couto 45'; Stanković 69'	Report	O'Neill (red card) 51'	Stadium: Stadio Olimpico; Attendance: 42,826; Referee: Robert Boggi

18 October 1998 5	Internazionale	3–5	Lazio	Milan
20:30 CEST (UTC+02:00)	Winter 22'; Ventola 77', 90+6'; Simeone (red card) 90+2'	Report	Salas 1'; Conceição 36', 53'; R. Mancini 40'; Nedvěd 72', (red card) 72'	Stadium: San Siro; Attendance: 70,000; Referee: Robert Boggi

25 October 1998 6	Lazio	1–1	Vicenza	Rome
16:00 CET (UTC+01:00)	R. Mancini 55'	Report	Schenardi 30'	Stadium: Stadio Olimpico; Attendance: 35,000; Referee: Salvatore Racalbuto

1 November 1998 7	Salernitana	1–0	Lazio	Salerno
15:00 CET (UTC+01:00)	G. Tedesco 88'	Report		Stadium: Stadio Arechi; Attendance: 35,000; Referee: Fiorenzo Treossi

8 November 1998 8	Lazio	4–1	Empoli	Rome
16:00 CET (UTC+01:00)	Negro 22', 26'; Salas 30'; R. Mancini 63'	Report	Carparelli 81'	Stadium: Stadio Olimpico; Attendance: 39,378; Referee: Gennaro Borriello

15 November 1998 9	Venezia	2–0	Lazio	Venice
16:00 CET (UTC+01:00)	Tuta 5'; Pedone 38'	Report	Couto (red card) 61'	Stadium: Stadio Pier Luigi Penzo; Attendance: 15,000; Referee: Cosimo Bolognino

22 November 1998 10	Milan	1–0	Lazio	Milan
20:30 CET (UTC+01:00)	Leonardo 90+2'	Report		Stadium: San Siro; Attendance: 45,985; Referee: Stefano Farina

29 November 1998 11	Lazio	3–3	Roma	Rome
20:30 CET (UTC+01:00)	R. Mancini 28', 56'; Salas 58' (pen.)	Report	Delvecchio 25'; Petruzzi (red card) 65'; Di Francesco 78'; Totti 81'	Stadium: Stadio Olimpico; Attendance: 75,000; Referee: Stefano Farina

6 December 1998 12	Juventus	0–1	Lazio	Turin
16:00 CET (UTC+01:00)		Report	Salas 82'	Stadium: Stadio delle Alpi; Attendance: 46,107; Referee: Gennaro Borriello

13 December 1998 13	Lazio	5–2	Sampdoria	Rome
16:00 CET (UTC+01:00)	Mihajlović 29', 45', 52'; Stanković 82'; Salas 90+3'	Report	Palmieri 37' (pen.), 56' (pen.)	Stadium: Stadio Olimpico; Attendance: 49,676; Referee: Pierluigi Collina

20 December 1998 14	Lazio	3–1	Udinese	Rome
16:00 CET (UTC+01:00)	R. Mancini 17'; Salas 55', 90+5'	Report	Locatelli 5'	Stadium: Stadio Olimpico; Attendance: 41,749; Referee: Daniele Tombolini

6 January 1999 15	Bologna	0–1	Lazio	Bologna
14:30 CET (UTC+01:00)		Report	Vieri 77'	Stadium: Stadio Renato Dall'Ara; Attendance: 31,160; Referee: Piero Ceccarini

10 January 1999 16	Lazio	2–0	Fiorentina	Rome
20:30 CET (UTC+01:00)	Vieri 66'; Mihajlović 90'	Report	Padalino (red card) 89'	Stadium: Stadio Olimpico; Attendance: 55,487; Referee: Livio Bazzoli

17 January 1999 17	Parma	1–3	Lazio	Parma
20:30 CET (UTC+01:00)	Crespo 54'	Report	Salas 51' (pen.); R. Mancini 68'; Vieri 90+1'	Stadium: Stadio Ennio Tardini; Attendance: 26,003; Referee: Livio Bazzoli

24 January 1999 18	Lazio	4–1	Piacenza	Rome
14:30 CET (UTC+01:00)	Mihajlović 10'; Salas 59'; Stanković 78'; R. Mancini 81'	Report	Buso 57'; Piovani (red card) 84'	Stadium: Stadio Olimpico; Attendance: 46,934; Referee: Pierluigi Collina

31 January 1999 19	Bari	1–3	Lazio	Bari
14:30 CET (UTC+01:00)	Knudsen 73'	Report	Lombardo 21'; Vieri 38', 87'	Stadium: Stadio San Nicola; Attendance: 23,428; Referee: Salvatore Racalbuto

7 February 1999 20	Lazio	3–0	Perugia	Rome
14:30 CET (UTC+01:00)	Vieri 42'; Salas 45+2', 76'	Report		Stadium: Stadio Olimpico; Attendance: 49,798; Referee: Cosimo Bolognino

14 February 1999 21	Cagliari	0–0	Lazio	Cagliari
14:30 CET (UTC+01:00)		Report		Stadium: Stadio Sant'Elia; Attendance: 25,000; Referee: Alfredo Trentalange

21 February 1999 22	Lazio	1–0	Internazionale	Rome
14:30 CET (UTC+01:00)	Conceição 39'	Report		Stadium: Stadio Olimpico; Attendance: 66,756; Referee: Graziano Cesari

28 February 1999 23	Vicenza	1–2	Lazio	Vicenza
14:30 CET (UTC+01:00)	Cardone 68'	Report	Conceição 48'; Salas (penalty missed) 74'; Stanković (red card) 82'; Dicara 90' (o.g.)	Stadium: Stadio Romeo Menti; Attendance: 18,000; Referee: Salvatore Racalbuto

7 March 1999 24	Lazio	6–1	Salernitana	Rome
14:30 CET (UTC+01:00)	Negro 45'; Vieri 50'; Salas 60', 69'; Fresi 82' (o.g.); Nesta 90'	Report	Vannucchi 31'	Stadium: Stadio Olimpico; Attendance: 52,625; Referee: Cosimo Bolognino

14 March 1999 25	Empoli	0–0	Lazio	Empoli
14:30 CET (UTC+01:00)		Report		Stadium: Stadio Carlo Castellani; Attendance: 15,000; Referee: Stefano Braschi

21 March 1999 26	Lazio	2–0	Venezia	Rome
16:00 CET (UTC+01:00)	Conceição 8'; Mihajlović 14'	Report		Stadium: Stadio Olimpico; Attendance: 55,000; Referee: Robert Boggi

3 April 1999 27	Lazio	0–0	Milan	Rome
16:00 CEST (UTC+02:00)		Report		Stadium: Stadio Olimpico; Attendance: 63,875; Referee: Graziano Cesari

11 April 1999 28	Roma	3–1	Lazio	Rome
20:30 CEST (UTC+02:00)	Delvecchio 13', 43'; Paulo Sérgio (red card) 70'; Totti 90'	Report	Mihajlović (red card) 70'; Vieri 79'; Nesta (red card) 80'	Stadium: Stadio Olimpico; Attendance: 75,560; Referee: Gennaro Borriello

17 April 1999 29	Lazio	1–3	Juventus	Rome
16:00 CEST (UTC+02:00)	R. Mancini 56'	Report	Henry 34', 64'; Amoruso 45+3'	Stadium: Stadio Olimpico; Attendance: 60,000; Referee: Livio Bazzoli

25 April 1999 30	Sampdoria	0–1	Lazio	Genoa
16:00 CEST (UTC+02:00)	Ortega (red card) 72'	Report	Vieri 60'; Almeyda (red card) 66'	Stadium: Stadio Luigi Ferraris; Attendance: 16,885; Referee: Livio Bazzoli

2 May 1999 31	Udinese	0–3	Lazio	Udine
16:00 CEST (UTC+02:00)		Report	Mihajlović 30' (pen.); Vieri 48'; R. Mancini 58'	Stadium: Stadio Friuli; Attendance: 28,824; Referee: Emilio Pellegrino

9 May 1999 32	Lazio	2–0	Bologna	Rome
16:00 CEST (UTC+02:00)	Almeyda 50'; Vieri 89'	Report		Stadium: Stadio Olimpico; Attendance: 57,507; Referee: Robert Boggi

15 May 1999 33	Fiorentina	1–1	Lazio	Florence
16:30 CEST (UTC+02:00)	Batistuta 14'; Rui Costa (penalty missed) 72'	Report	Vieri 27'	Stadium: Stadio Artemio Franchi; Attendance: 38,793; Referee: Fiorenzo Treossi

23 May 1999 34	Lazio	2–1	Parma	Rome
16:30 CEST (UTC+02:00)	Salas 27', 76'	Report	Vanoli 54'	Stadium: Stadio Olimpico; Attendance: 73,967; Referee: Livio Bazzoli

=== Coppa Italia ===
==== Second round ====
9 September 1998 First leg	Lazio	2–1	Cosenza	Rome
	Salas 69', 80' (pen.)		Riccio 59'; Paschetta (red card) 64'	Stadium: Stadio Olimpico; Attendance: 25,000; Referee: Franco Sirotti

23 September 1998 Second leg	Cosenza	0–2 (1–4 agg.)	Lazio	Cosenza
			Parisi 15' (o.g.); Stanković 86'	Stadium: Stadio Comunale; Attendance: 24,149; Referee: Fiorenzo Treossi

==== Round of 16 ====
29 October 1998 First leg	Lazio	3–1	Milan	Rome
20:45 CET (UTC+01:00)	Mihajlović 28'; R. Mancini 71', 90+5'		Bierhoff 6'; Costacurta (red card) 90+2'	Stadium: Stadio Olimpico; Attendance: 22,520; Referee: Alfredo Trentalange

11 November 1998 Second leg	Milan	1–1 (2–4 agg.)	Lazio	Milan
20:30 CET (UTC+01:00)	Ganz 56'		Salas 42'; Conceição (red card) 81'	Stadium: San Siro; Attendance: 22,702; Referee: Stefano Braschi

==== Quarter-finals ====
3 December 1998 First leg	Lazio	2–1	Internazionale	Rome
20:30 CET (UTC+01:00)	Salas 12' (pen.), 46'		Djorkaeff 32'	Stadium: Stadio Olimpico; Attendance: 22,564; Referee: Piero Ceccarini

27 January 1999 Second leg	Internazionale	5–2 (6–4 agg.)	Lazio	Milan
20:45 CET (UTC+01:00)	Cauet 13'; Djorkaeff 25', 69'; Zé Elias 84'; Moriero 90+3'		Vieri 10'; Lombardo 34'; Nesta (red card) 87'	Stadium: San Siro; Attendance: 17,007; Referee: Piero Ceccarini

=== UEFA Cup Winners' Cup ===
==== First round ====
17 September 1998 First leg	Lazio (Italy)	1–1	(Switzerland) Lausanne-Sport	Rome, Italy
20:45 CEST (UTC+02:00)	Stanković (red card) 2'; Nedvěd 37'	Report	Celestini (penalty missed) 3'; Douglas 54'	Stadium: Stadio Olimpico; Attendance: 22,659; Referee: Dani Koren (Israel)

1 October 1998 Second leg	Lausanne-Sport (Switzerland)	2–2 (3–3a agg.)	(Italy) Lazio	Lausanne, Switzerland
20:45 CEST (UTC+02:00)	Douglas 10'; Rehn 84'	Report	Salas 7'; Conceição 26'	Stadium: Stade Olympique de la Pontaise; Attendance: 12,500; Referee: Kyros Vassaras (Greece)

==== Second round ====
22 October 1998 First leg	Lazio (Italy)	0–0	(Federal Republic of Yugoslavia) Partizan	Rome, Italy
20:45 CEST (UTC+02:00)		Report		Stadium: Stadio Olimpico; Attendance: 24,966; Referee: René Temmink (Netherlands)

5 November 1998 Second leg	Partizan (Federal Republic of Yugoslavia)	2–3 (2–3 agg.)	(Italy) Lazio	Belgrade, FR Yugoslavia
20:45 CET (UTC+01:00)	Krstajić 18'; Iliev 85'	Report	Salas 43' (pen.), 76'; Stanković 67'	Stadium: Partizan Stadium; Attendance: 32,000; Referee: Fritz Stuchlik (Austria)

==== Quarter-finals ====
4 March 1999 First leg	Panionios (Greece)	0–4	(Italy) Lazio	Athens, Greece
21:45 CET (UTC+01:00)		Report	Stanković 3', 60'; Salas 14'; Nedvěd 63'	Stadium: Nea Smyrni Stadium; Attendance: 10,175; Referee: Graham Poll (England)

18 March 1999 Second leg	Lazio (Italy)	3–0 (7–0 agg.)	(Greece) Panionios	Rome, Italy
20:45 CET (UTC+01:00)	Nedvěd 70'; Stanković 77' de la Peña 82'	Report		Stadium: Stadio Olimpico; Attendance: 20,488; Referee: Bernd Heynemann (Germany)

==== Semi-finals ====
8 April 1999 First leg	Lokomotiv Moscow (Russia)	1–1	(Italy) Lazio	Moscow, Russia
20:00 CEST (UTC+02:00)	Janashia 62'	Report	Bokšić 77'	Stadium: Lokomotiv Stadium; Attendance: 23,000; Referee: Gilles Veissière (France)

22 April 1999 Second leg	Lazio (Italy)	0–0 (1a–1 agg.)	(Russia) Lokomotiv Moscow	Rome, Italy
20:45 CEST (UTC+02:00)		Report		Stadium: Stadio Olimpico; Attendance: 32,016; Referee: Anders Frisk (Sweden)

==== Final ====
19 May 1999	Mallorca (Spain)	1–2	(Italy) Lazio	Birmingham, England
20:45 CEST (UTC+02:00)	Dani 11'; Siviero (yellow card) 54'	Report	Vieri 7', (yellow card) 39'; Mihajlović (yellow card) 23'; Nedvěd 81'; Marchegiani (yellow card) 90+1'	Stadium: Villa Park; Attendance: 33,021; Referee: Günther Benkö (Austria)

=== Other matches and friendlies ===
Pre-season

20 August 1998 Cirio Cup, #1	Lazio	1–0	Fiorentina	Rome
	Salas 45' (pen.)	Report		Stadium: Stadio Olimpico; Attendance: 35,000

3 September 1998 Memorial Mario Cecchi Gori, #1	Lazio	1–2	(France) Monaco	Florence
	Iannuzzi 4'	Report	Berthe 22'; Costinha 32'	Stadium: Stadio Artemio Franchi
Note: The match lasted one 45-minute half

3 September 1998 Memorial Mario Cecchi Gori, #2	Fiorentina	2–0	Lazio	Florence
	Batistuta 14', 20'	Report		Stadium: Stadio Artemio Franchi
Note: The match lasted one 45-minute half

Post-season

27 May 1999 Cirio Cup, #2	Universidad de Chile	1–1 (5–4 p)	(Italy) Lazio	Santiago, Chile
	González 49'	Report	Salas 27'	Stadium: Estadio Nacional; Attendance: 45,000; Referee: Rubén Selman (Chile)
	Penalties
	González (penalty scored); Tello (penalty scored); Aros (penalty scored); Vargas (penalty scored); Rodríguez (penalty scored)		(penalty scored) de la Peña; (penalty scored) Baronio; (penalty missed) Couto; (penalty scored) Negro; (penalty scored) Mihajlović

== Statistics ==
=== Players statistics ===
No.	Pos	Nat	Player	Total		Serie A		Coppa		Cup Winners' Cup	
No.	Pos	Nat	Player	Apps	Goals	Apps	Goals	Apps	Goals	Apps	Goals
1	GK	(Italy) ITA	Marchegiani	47	-44	34	-29	5	-8	8	-7
15	DF	(Italy) ITA	Pancaro	42	0	27+3	0	4	0	8	0
11	DF	(Federal Republic of Yugoslavia) YUG	Mihajlovic	43	9	30	8	4	1	9	0
13	DF	(Italy) ITA	Nesta	26	1	20	1	2	0	4	0
5	DF	(Italy) ITA	Favalli	34	0	23+2	0	4	0	5	0
14	MF	(Portugal) POR	Conceicao	43	6	32+1	5	5	0	5	1
25	MF	(Argentina) ARG	Almeyda	35	1	25	1	4	0	6	0
20	MF	(Federal Republic of Yugoslavia) YUG	Stankovic	41	9	22+7	4	5	1	7	4
10	FW	(Italy) ITA	Mancini	46	12	30+3	10	6	2	7	0
9	FW	(Chile) CHI	Salas	42	24	29+1	15	6	5	6	4
32	FW	(Italy) ITA	Vieri	28	14	21+1	12	2	1	4	1
22	GK	(Italy) ITA	Ballotta	5	-3	0+3	-2	1	-1	1	0
2	DF	(Italy) ITA	Negro	28	3	20+1	3	4	0	3	0
18	MF	(Czech Republic) CZE	Nedved	33	5	18+3	1	4	0	8	4
24	DF	(Portugal) POR	Couto	35	2	12+10	2	5	0	8	0
23	MF	(Italy) ITA	Venturin	25	0	10+6	0	5	0	4	0
7	MF	(Italy) ITA	Lombardo	20	2	7+7	1	1	1	5	0
21	MF	(Spain) ESP	De la Peña	22	1	4+11	0	3	0	4	1
26	MF	(Italy) ITA	Baronio	14	0	2+5	0	3	0	4	0
3	DF	(Italy) ITA	Lombardi	10	0	2+2	0	3	0	3	0
16	MF	(Australia) AUS	Okon	5	0	3+2	0				
6	DF	(Italy) ITA	Lopez	8	0	2+2	0	2	0	2	0
27	FW	(Italy) ITA	Ianuzzi	2	0	1+1	0	0	0	0	0
8	FW	(Italy) ITA	Protti	3	0	1+1	0	1	0		
17	DF	(Switzerland) SUI	Gottardi	21	0	0+13	0	3	0	5	0
19	FW	(Croatia) CRO	Boksic	6	1	0+3	0	0	0	3	1
4	MF	(Italy) ITA	Marcolin	1	0	0	0	0	0	1	0
6	MF	(Italy) ITA	Crovari	1	0	0	0	0	0	1	0
12	GK	(Italy) ITA	Concetti	0	0	0	0				
29	MF	(Italy) ITA	Pinzi	0	0	0	0				
31	MF	(Italy) ITA	Sbaccanti	0	0	0	0				
33	DF	(Italy) ITA	Di Fiordo	0	0	0	0				

- Source: http://calcio-seriea.net/allenatori_squadra/1998/1155/
