= 1999–2000 SS Lazio season =

Lazio
1999–2000 season
- Owner: Sergio Cragnotti
- President: Sergio Cragnotti
- Manager: Sven-Göran Eriksson
- Stadium: Stadio Olimpico
- Serie A: 1st
- Coppa Italia: Winners
- UEFA Champions League: Quarter-finals
- UEFA Super Cup: Winners
- Top goalscorer: League: Marcelo Salas (12); All: Simone Inzaghi (19)
- Biggest win: 5–0 vs Venezia
- Biggest defeat: 1–4 vs Roma; 2–5 vs Valencia
Home colours	Away colours	Third colours

The 1999–2000 season was Società Sportiva Lazio's 100th season since the club's existence and their 12th consecutive season in the top-flight of Italian football. In this season, Lazio won their second Scudetto of their history, and their third Coppa Italia, completing an historical double.

In Europe, Lazio was knocked out at the quarter-finals of the UEFA Champions League by Valencia but won the 1999 UEFA Super Cup against Manchester United.

== Players ==
=== Squad information ===
Squad at end of season

Note: Flags indicate national team as defined under FIFA eligibility rules; some limited exceptions apply. Players may hold more than one non-FIFA nationality.

No.	Pos.	Nation	Player
1	GK	ITA	Luca Marchegiani
2	DF	ITA	Paolo Negro
3	DF	ITA	Stefano Di Fiordo
4	MF	ITA	Dario Marcolin
5	DF	ITA	Giuseppe Favalli
6	DF	ARG	Néstor Sensini
7	MF	POR	Sérgio Conceição
8	FW	CRO	Alen Bokšić
9	FW	CHI	Marcelo Salas
10	FW	ITA	Roberto Mancini
11	DF	YUG	Siniša Mihajlović
12	GK	ITA	Emanuele Concetti
13	DF	ITA	Alessandro Nesta
14	MF	ARG	Diego Simeone

No.	Pos.	Nation	Player
15	DF	ITA	Giuseppe Pancaro
16	MF	ITA	Attilio Lombardo
17	DF	SUI	Guerino Gottardi
18	MF	CZE	Pavel Nedvěd
20	MF	YUG	Dejan Stanković
21	FW	ITA	Simone Inzaghi
22	GK	ITA	Marco Ballotta
23	MF	ARG	Juan Sebastián Verón
24	DF	POR	Fernando Couto
25	MF	ARG	Matías Almeyda
26	FW	ITA	Gasperino Cinelli
27	MF	ITA	Giampiero Pinzi
28	GK	ITA	Luca Mondini
33	FW	ITA	Fabrizio Ravanelli

=== Transfers ===
In
Pos.	Name	from	Type
MF	Juan Sebastián Verón	Parma	€30.0 million
DF	Néstor Sensini	Parma	€7.5 million
MF	Diego Simeone	Internazionale	US$13.0 million
FW	Kennet Andersson	Bologna	
FW	Simone Inzaghi	Piacenza	
GK	Luca Mondini	Napoli	loan
GK	Flavio Roma	Chievo Verona	loan ended
MF	Dario Marcolin	Blackburn Rovers	loan ended
FW	Giuseppe Signori	Bologna	co-ownership

Out
Pos.	Name	To	Type
FW	Christian Vieri	Internazionale	U$50.0 million
GK	Flavio Roma	Piacenza	
DF	Federico Crovari	Treviso	
DF	Stefano Di Fiordo	Padova	
MF	Roberto Baronio	Reggina	co-ownership
FW	Giuseppe Signori	Bologna	

==== Winter ====
In
Pos.	Name	from	Type
FW	Fabrizio Ravanelli	Marseille	

Out
Pos.	Name	To	Type
FW	Kennet Andersson	Bologna	
MF	Iván de la Peña	Marseille	loan
DF	Marco Pisano	Brescia	

=== Kits ===
Home	Away	Third	Centennial	Centennial Alt.	UEFA Champions League

== Competitions ==
=== Serie A ===
==== League table ====
Pos	Team	Pld	W	D	L	GF	GA	GD	Pts	Qualification or relegation
1	Lazio (C)	34	21	9	4	64	33	+31	72	Qualification to Champions League first group stage
2	Juventus	34	21	8	5	46	20	+26	71	Qualification to Champions League first group stage
3	Milan	34	16	13	5	65	40	+25	61	Qualification to Champions League third qualifying round
4	Internazionale (Note: Internazionale entered the 2000–01 UEFA Champions League after winning the UEFA Champions League qualification match against Parma.)	34	17	7	10	58	36	+22	58	Qualification to Champions League third qualifying round
5	Parma	34	16	10	8	52	37	+15	58	Qualification to UEFA Cup first round

Source: Serie A, RSSSF.com, Soccerway
Rules for classification: 1) Points; 2) Head-to-head points; 3) Head-to-head goal difference; 4) Goal difference; 5) Goals scored; 6) Draw. (Note: Head-to-head record is used only after all the matches between the teams in question have been played).
(C) Champions

==== Results summary ====
Overall								Home						Away					
Pld	W	D	L	GF	GA	GD	Pts	W	D	L	GF	GA	GD	W	D	L	GF	GA	GD
34	21	9	4	64	33	+31	72	13	4	0	40	15	+25	8	5	4	24	18	+6

==== Results by round ====
Round	1	2	3	4	5	6	7	8	9	10	11	12	13	14	15	16	17	18	19	20	21	22	23	24	25	26	27	28	29	30	31	32	33	34
Ground	H	A	H	A	H	A	H	A	H	A	H	A	H	H	A	H	A	A	H	A	H	A	H	A	H	A	H	A	H	A	A	H	A	H
Result	W	D	W	W	D	W	W	D	W	L	D	W	W	W	L	W	D	D	W	W	D	L	W	W	D	L	W	W	W	D	W	W	W	W
Position	1	1	1	1	2	1	1	1	1	1	1	1	1	1	2	1	2	2	2	1	2	3	2	2	2	2	2	2	2	2	2	2	2	1

Source: Competitive matches
A = Away; H = Home; W = Win; D = Draw; L = Loss; P = Postponed; = Leader, 2000–01 UEFA Champions League Group stage; = 2000–01 UEFA Champions League Group stage; = 2000–01 UEFA Champions League Qualifying round; = 2000–01 UEFA Cup First round; = Qualification to Intertoto Cup; = 2000–01 Serie B

==== Matches ====
30 August 1999 1	Lazio	2–1	Cagliari	Rome
20:30 CEST (UTC+02:00)	Verón 5'; S. Inzaghi 64' (pen.)	Report	O'Neill 78'	Stadium: Stadio Olimpico; Attendance: 51,319; Referee: Stefano Farina

11 September 1999 2	Bari	0–0	Lazio	Bari
20:30 CEST (UTC+02:00)		Report		Stadium: Stadio San Nicola; Attendance: 22,067; Referee: Fiorenzo Treossi

19 September 1999 3	Lazio	3–0	Torino	Rome
15:00 CEST (UTC+02:00)	Verón 14' (pen.); S. Inzaghi 45'; Salas 88'	Report		Stadium: Stadio Olimpico; Attendance: 45,603; Referee: Stefano Braschi

26 September 1999 4	Parma	1–2	Lazio	Parma
20:30 CEST (UTC+02:00)	Boghossian 62'	Report	Salas 30'; Almeyda 69'	Stadium: Stadio Ennio Tardini; Attendance: 20,208; Referee: Pierluigi Collina

3 October 1999 5	Lazio	4–4	Milan	Rome
20:30 CEST (UTC+02:00)	Verón 18'; Abbiati 36' (o.g.); Salas 38', 72'	Report	Mihajlović 35' (o.g.); Shevchenko 43', 63', 68'	Stadium: Stadio Olimpico; Attendance: 56,135; Referee: Livio Bazzoli

16 October 1999 6	Udinese	0–3	Lazio	Udine
15:00 CEST (UTC+02:00)		Report	Verón 31'; Bokšić 43'; Mihajlović 84'	Stadium: Stadio Friuli; Attendance: 19,439; Referee: Roberto Rosetti

24 October 1999 7	Lazio	4–2	Lecce	Rome
15:00 CEST (UTC+02:00)	Pancaro 26'; Stanković 30', 32'; S. Inzaghi 90+4'	Report	Lucarelli 16', 33'	Stadium: Stadio Olimpico; Attendance: 45,000; Referee: Graziano Cesari

30 October 1999 8	Internazionale	1–1	Lazio	Milan
20:30 CEST (UTC+02:00)	Zamorano 36'	Report	Pancaro 90'	Stadium: San Siro; Attendance: 76,161; Referee: Fiorenzo Treossi

7 November 1999 9	Lazio	4–0	Hellas Verona	Rome
15:00 CET (UTC+01:00)	Verón 17'; Salas 22'; Negro 45'; Bokšić 63'	Report		Stadium: Stadio Olimpico; Attendance: 42,926; Referee: Salvatore Racalbuto

21 November 1999 10	Roma	4–1	Lazio	Rome
15:00 CET (UTC+01:00)	Delvecchio 7', 26'; Montella 11', 31'	Report	Mihajlović 52' (pen.)	Stadium: Stadio Olimpico; Attendance: 77,988; Referee: Daniele Tombolini

28 November 1999 11	Lazio	0–0	Juventus	Rome
20:30 CET (UTC+01:00)	S. Inzaghi (red card) 87'	Report		Stadium: Stadio Olimpico; Attendance: 72,101; Referee: Stefano Braschi

4 December 1999 12	Perugia	0–2	Lazio	Perugia
20:30 CET (UTC+01:00)		Report	Salas 37'; Conceição 62'	Stadium: Stadio Renato Curi; Attendance: 15,471; Referee: Domenico Messina

12 December 1999 13	Lazio	2–0	Fiorentina	Rome
15:00 CET (UTC+01:00)	Bokšić 15'; Stanković 71'	Report		Stadium: Stadio Olimpico; Attendance: 46,127; Referee: Livio Bazzoli

19 December 1999 14	Lazio	2–0	Piacenza	Rome
15:00 CET (UTC+01:00)	Salas 8'; Mihajlović 59'	Report	Delli Carri (red card) 58'	Stadium: Stadio Olimpico; Attendance: 41,551; Referee: Cosimo Bolognino

5 January 2000 15	Venezia	2–0	Lazio	Venice
20:30 CET (UTC+01:00)	Ganz 18'; Maniero 56'	Report		Stadium: Stadio Pier Luigi Penzo; Attendance: 9,788; Referee: Stefano Farina

9 January 2000 16	Lazio	3–1	Bologna	Rome
15:00 CET (UTC+01:00)	Mihajlović (penalty missed) 26'; Salas 42'; Nedvěd 76', (red card) 84'; Ravanelli 90+5'	Report	Andersson 51'; Paramatti (red card) 89'	Stadium: Stadio Olimpico; Attendance: 76,000; Referee: Salvatore Racalbuto

16 January 2000 17	Reggina	0–0	Lazio	Reggio Calabria
15:00 CET (UTC+01:00)		Report		Stadium: Stadio Oreste Granillo; Attendance: 24,041; Referee: Graziano Cesari

22 January 2000 18	Cagliari	0–0	Lazio	Cagliari
20:30 CET (UTC+01:00)		Report		Stadium: Stadio Sant'Elia; Attendance: 20,000; Referee: Stefano Farina

30 January 2000 19	Lazio	3–1	Bari	Rome
15:00 CET (UTC+01:00)	Mihajlović 1' (pen.); Salas 39'; Nedvěd 43'	Report	Spinesi 42'	Stadium: Stadio Olimpico; Attendance: 44,349; Referee: Tarcisio Serena

6 February 2000 20	Torino	2–4	Lazio	Turin
15:00 CET (UTC+01:00)	Ferrante 83' (pen.); Galante 90'	Report	Sensini 9'; Mihajlović 55' (pen.), (red card) 82'; Ravanelli 66'; Salas 90+1'	Stadium: Stadio delle Alpi; Attendance: 19,016; Referee: Emilio Pellegrino

13 February 2000 21	Lazio	0–0	Parma	Rome
20:30 CET (UTC+01:00)		Report		Stadium: Stadio Olimpico; Attendance: 47,126; Referee: Livio Bazzoli

20 February 2000 22	Milan	2–1	Lazio	Milan
20:30 CET (UTC+01:00)	Boban 38' (pen.), 45+2' (pen.); Ambrosini (red card) 90'	Report	S. Inzaghi 84'	Stadium: San Siro; Attendance: 68,943; Referee: Roberto Rosetti

26 February 2000 23	Lazio	2–1	Udinese	Rome
15:00 CET (UTC+01:00)	Negro 18'; Salas 47'	Report	T. Locatelli 90'	Stadium: Stadio Olimpico; Attendance: 42,209; Referee: Alberto Castellani

5 March 2000 24	Lecce	0–1	Lazio	Lecce
15:00 CET (UTC+01:00)	Colonnello (red card) 90+2'	Report	Nedvěd 38'	Stadium: Stadio Via del Mare; Attendance: 16,642; Referee: Domenico Messina

11 March 2000 25	Lazio	2–2	Internazionale	Rome
20:30 CET (UTC+01:00)	S. Inzaghi 83'; Pancaro 88'	Report	Recoba 19'; Cordoba (red card) 41'; Di Biagio 79'	Stadium: Stadio Olimpico; Attendance: 66,491; Referee: Stefano Braschi

19 March 2000 26	Hellas Verona	1–0	Lazio	Verona
15:00 CET (UTC+01:00)	Morfeo 30'	Report		Stadium: Stadio Marc'Antonio Bentegodi; Attendance: 19,246; Referee: Tarcisio Serena

25 March 2000 27	Lazio	2–1	Roma	Rome
15:00 CET (UTC+01:00)	Nedvěd 25'; Verón 28'	Report	Montella 3'	Stadium: Stadio Olimpico; Attendance: 74,076; Referee: Domenico Messina

1 April 2000 28	Juventus	0–1	Lazio	Turin
20:30 CEST (UTC+02:00)	Ferrara (red card) 64'	Report	Simeone 66'	Stadium: Stadio delle Alpi; Attendance: 54,492; Referee: Stefano Farina

9 April 2000 29	Lazio	1–0	Perugia	Rome
15:00 CEST (UTC+02:00)	Lombardo 47'	Report		Stadium: Stadio Olimpico; Attendance: 42,990; Referee: Roberto Rosetti

15 April 2000 30	Fiorentina	3–3	Lazio	Florence
15:00 CEST (UTC+02:00)	Batistuta 25', 90+2'; Chiesa 54'	Report	Nedvěd 27'; Bokšić 31'; Mihajlović (penalty missed) 82', 89' (pen.)	Stadium: Stadio Artemio Franchi; Attendance: 37,417; Referee: Daniele Tombolini

22 April 2000 31	Piacenza	0–2	Lazio	Piacenza
15:00 CEST (UTC+02:00)		Report	Simeone 60'; Verón 68'	Stadium: Stadio Leonardo Garilli; Attendance: 8,428; Referee: Domenico Messina

30 April 2000 32	Lazio	3–2	Venezia	Rome
15:00 CEST (UTC+02:00)	Simeone 39'; S. Inzaghi 45+2'; Maniero 83' (o.g.)	Report	Pedone 58'; Ganz 90+4'	Stadium: Stadio Olimpico; Attendance: 51,747; Referee: Salvatore Racalbuto

7 May 2000 33	Bologna	2–3	Lazio	Bologna
15:00 CEST (UTC+02:00)	Signori 39', 89'	Report	Conceição 25'; Simeone 63'; Salas 75'	Stadium: Stadio Renato Dall'Ara; Attendance: 36,317; Referee: Domenico Messina

14 May 2000 34	Lazio	3–0	Reggina	Rome
15:00 CEST (UTC+02:00)	S. Inzaghi 33' (pen.); Verón 37' (pen.); Simeone 59'	Report		Stadium: Stadio Olimpico; Attendance: 65,000; Referee: Gennaro Borriello

=== Coppa Italia ===
==== Round of 16 ====
1 December 1999 First leg	Ravenna	1–1	Lazio	Ravenna
20:50 CEST (UTC+01:00)	Vecchiola 76'		Bokšić 65'	Stadium: Stadio Bruno Benelli; Attendance: 4,884; Referee: Domenico Messina

15 December 1999 Second leg	Lazio	4–1 (5–2 agg.)	Ravenna	Rome
20:50 CEST (UTC+01:00)	Mihajlović 14', 90'; S. Inzaghi 51'; Bokšić 90+4'		Sotgia 53'	Stadium: Stadio Olimpico; Attendance: 4,327; Referee: Emilio Pellegrino

==== Quarter-finals ====
13 January 2000 First leg	Juventus	3–2	Lazio	Turin
20:50 CEST (UTC+01:00)	Zidane 12'; Conte 30'; Kovačević 43'		Ravanelli 51' (pen.); R. Mancini 80'	Stadium: Stadio delle Alpi; Attendance: 5,183; Referee: Domenico Messina

26 January 2000 Second leg	Lazio	2–1 (4a–4 agg.)	Juventus	Rome
20:50 CEST (UTC+01:00)	Bokšić 54'; Simeone 81'		Del Piero 73'	Stadium: Stadio Olimpico; Attendance: 23,795; Referee: Pierluigi Collina

==== Semi-finals ====
10 February 2000 First leg	Lazio	5–0	Venezia	Rome
20:50 CEST (UTC+01:00)	R. Mancini 14', 24'; Mihajlović 28' (pen.), 59' (pen.); Ravanelli (penalty missed) 40', 89'			Stadium: Stadio Olimpico; Attendance: 11,910; Referee: Cosimo Bolognino

16 February 2000 Second leg	Venezia	2–2 (2–7 agg.)	Lazio	Venice
20:50 CEST (UTC+01:00)	Valtolina 52'; Berg 90'; Cardone (red card) 90+1'		S. Inzaghi 2', 72'; Ravanelli (red card) 90+1'	Stadium: Stadio Pier Luigi Penzo; Attendance: 381; Referee: Lorenzo Branzoni

==== Final ====
12 April 2000 First leg	Lazio	2–1	Internazionale	Rome
20:50 CEST (UTC+02:00)	Nedvěd 40'; Simeone 52'		Seedorf 8'	Stadium: Stadio Olimpico; Attendance: 35,824; Referee: Alfredo Trentalange

18 May 2000 Second leg	Internazionale	0–0 (1–2 agg.)	Lazio	Milan
20:50 CEST (UTC+02:00)				Stadium: San Siro; Attendance: 53,406; Referee: Gianluca Paparesta

=== UEFA Champions League ===
==== Group stage ====
Pos	Team	Pld	W	D	L	GF	GA	GD	Pts	Qualification
1	(Italy) Lazio	6	4	2	0	13	3	+10	14	Advance to second group stage
2	(Ukraine) Dynamo Kyiv	6	2	1	3	8	8	0	7	Advance to second group stage
3	(Germany) Bayer Leverkusen	6	1	4	1	7	7	0	7	Transfer to UEFA Cup
4	(Slovenia) Maribor	6	1	1	4	2	12	−10	4	

Source: UEFA

14 September 1999 1	Bayer Leverkusen (Germany)	1–1	(Italy) Lazio	Leverkusen, Germany
20:45 CEST (UTC+02:00)	Neuville 14'; Schneider (yellow card) 77'	Report	Stanković (yellow card) 11'; Mihajlović 18', (yellow card) 32'; Verón (yellow card) 20'; Almeyda (yellow card) 76'	Stadium: BayArena; Attendance: 22,500; Referee: Graham Poll (England)

22 September 1999 2	Lazio (Italy)	2–1	(Ukraine) Dynamo Kyiv	Rome, Italy
20:45 CEST (UTC+02:00)	Nedvěd (yellow card) 22'; Almeyda (yellow card) 41'; Stanković (yellow card) 42'; Mihajlović (yellow card) 44'; Negro (yellow card) 67', (goal) 72'; Salas 75'	Report	Kosovskyi (yellow card) 58'; Rebrov 68' (pen.)	Stadium: Stadio Olimpico; Attendance: 37,348; Referee: Manuel Díaz Vega (Spain)

29 September 1999 3	Lazio (Italy)	4–0	(Slovenia) Maribor	Rome, Italy
20:45 CEST (UTC+02:00)	Pancaro (yellow card) 25'; S. Inzaghi 59'; Conceição 61'; Salas 70', 76'	Report	Çipi (yellow card) (yellow-red card) 19'	Stadium: Stadio Olimpico; Attendance: 29,571; Referee: Lucílio Batista (Portugal)

19 October 1999 4	Maribor (Slovenia)	0–4	(Italy) Lazio	Maribor, Slovenia
20:45 CEST (UTC+02:00)	Galič (yellow card) 35'	Report	Mihajlović 36'; S. Inzaghi 50', 74'; Stanković 63'	Stadium: Ljudski vrt Attendance: 10,000; Referee: Terje Hauge (Norway)

27 October 1999 5	Lazio (Italy)	1–1	(Germany) Bayer Leverkusen	Rome, Italy
20:45 CEST (UTC+02:00)	Nedvěd 1'; Pancaro (yellow card) 25'; Almeyda (yellow card) 61'	Report	Kirsten 44', (yellow card) 87'	Stadium: Stadio Olimpico; Attendance: 30,627; Referee: Hugh Dallas (Scotland)

2 November 1999 6	Dynamo Kyiv (Ukraine)	0–1	(Italy) Lazio	Kyiv, Ukraine
20:45 CET (UTC+01:00)	Kaladze (yellow card) 61'	Report	Mamedov 18' (o.g.)	Stadium: Olympiyskyi NSC; Attendance: 67,800; Referee: Paul Durkin (England)

==== Second group stage ====
Pos	Team	Pld	W	D	L	GF	GA	GD	Pts	Qualification
1	(Italy) Lazio	6	3	2	1	10	4	+6	11	Advance to knockout stage
2	(England) Chelsea	6	3	1	2	8	5	+3	10	Advance to knockout stage
3	(Netherlands) Feyenoord	6	2	2	2	7	7	0	8	
4	(France) Marseille	6	1	1	4	2	11	−9	4	

Source: UEFA

24 November 1999 1	Marseille (France)	0–2	(Italy) Lazio	Marseille, France
20:45 CET (UTC+01:00)	Berizzo (yellow card) 58'; Maurice (yellow card) 81'	Report	Stanković (yellow card) 56', (goal) 64'; Mihajlović (yellow card) 75'; Conceição 77'; Marchegiani (yellow card) 85'; Pancaro (yellow card) 90'; Nesta (yellow card) 90'; Favalli (yellow card) 90'; Sensini (yellow card) 90'	Stadium: Stade Vélodrome; Attendance: 43,000; Referee: Manuel Díaz Vega (Spain)

7 December 1999 2	Lazio (Italy)	0–0	(England) Chelsea	Rome, Italy
20:45 CET (UTC+01:00)		Report	Ferrer (yellow card) 72'	Stadium: Stadio Olimpico; Attendance: 38,662; Referee: Hellmut Krug (Germany)

29 February 2000 3	Lazio (Italy)	1–2	(Netherlands) Feyenoord	Rome, Italy
20:45 CET (UTC+01:00)	Verón 37'; Lombardo (yellow card) 49'; Stanković (yellow card) 77'; Simeone (yellow card) 81'; Couto (yellow card) 86'	Report	De Haan (yellow card) 24'; Tomasson 78', 84'	Stadium: Stadio Olimpico; Attendance: 17,883; Referee: Antonio López Nieto (Spain)

8 March 2000 4	Feyenoord (Netherlands)	0–0	(Italy) Lazio	Rotterdam, Netherlands
20:45 CET (UTC+01:00)	Konterman (yellow card) 29'; Van Wonderen (yellow card) 51'	Report	Nesta (yellow card) 21'; Verón (yellow card) 25'; Mihajlović (yellow card) 79'	Stadium: De Kuip; Attendance: 45,356; Referee: Günter Benkö (Austria)

14 March 2000 5	Lazio (Italy)	5–1	(France) Marseille	Rome, Italy
20:45 CET (UTC+01:00)	S. Inzaghi 17', 37', 38', 71' (penalty missed) 57'; Conceição (yellow card) 42'; Bokšić 82'	Report	Pires (yellow card) 38'; Leroy 50'; Luccin (yellow card) 60'; Brando (yellow card) 79'; Bakayoko (yellow card) 88'	Stadium: Stadio Olimpico; Attendance: 28,875; Referee: Anders Frisk (Sweden)

22 March 2000 6	Chelsea (England)	1–2	(Italy) Lazio	London, England
20:45 CET (UTC+01:00)	Di Matteo (yellow card) 12'; Leboeuf (yellow card) 34'; Poyet 44'; Flo (yellow card) 57'	Report	S. Inzaghi 54'; Pancaro (yellow card) 60'; Mihajlović 66'; Couto (yellow card) (yellow-red card) 72'; Salas (yellow card) 87'	Stadium: Stamford Bridge; Attendance: 34,260; Referee: Vítor Melo Pereira (Portugal)

==== Knockout phase ====
===== Quarter-finals =====
5 April 2000 First leg	Valencia (Spain)	5–2	(Italy) Lazio	Valencia, Spain
20:45 CEST (UTC+02:00)	Angulo 2'; Gerard 4', 40', 80', (yellow card) 43'; López 90+2'	Report	S. Inzaghi 28', (yellow card) 31'; Almeyda (yellow card) 64'; Salas 87'	Stadium: Mestalla; Attendance: 48,000; Referee: Kim Milton Nielsen (Denmark)

18 April 2000 Second leg	Lazio (Italy)	1–0 (3–5 agg.)	(Spain) Valencia	Rome, Italy
20:45 CEST (UTC+02:00)	Pancaro (yellow card) 44'; Verón 62'	Report	González (yellow card) 8'; Cañizares (yellow card) 67'	Stadium: Stadio Olimpico; Attendance: 57,000; Referee: Dick Jol (Netherlands)

=== UEFA Super Cup ===
27 August 1999	Manchester United (England)	0–1	(Italy) Lazio	Monaco, France
20:45 CEST (UTC+02:00)		Report	Salas 35'	Stadium: Stade Louis II; Attendance: 14,461; Referee: Ryszard Wójcik (Poland)

== Statistics ==
=== Players statistics ===
No.	Pos	Nat	Player	Total		Serie A		Coppa Italia		Champions League	
No.	Pos	Nat	Player	Apps	Goals	Apps	Goals	Apps	Goals	Apps	Goals
1	GK	(Italy) ITA	Marchegiani	38	-33	28	-27	0	0	10	-6
15	DF	(Italy) ITA	Pancaro	44	3	26+2	3	5	0	11	0
2	DF	(Italy) ITA	Negro	41	3	25+1	2	5	0	10	1
13	DF	(Italy) ITA	Nesta	40	0	28	0	3	0	9	0
11	DF	(Federal Republic of Yugoslavia) YUG	Mihajlović	45	13	26	6	7	4	12	3
7	MF	(Portugal) POR	Conceição	43	4	22+8	2	4	0	9	2
25	MF	(Argentina) ARG	Almeyda	29	1	15+4	1	2	0	8	0
14	MF	(Argentina) ARG	Simeone	46	7	15+13	5	7	2	11	0
23	MF	(Argentina) ARG	Verón	46	10	31	8	4	0	11	2
18	MF	(Czech Republic) CZE	Nedvěd	46	7	28	5	6	1	12	1
9	FW	(Chile) CHI	Salas	41	16	26+2	12	3	0	10	4
22	GK	(Italy) ITA	Ballotta	21	-21	6+3	-6	8	-9	4	-6
5	DF	(Italy) ITA	Favalli	25	0	16+2	0	2	0	5	0
6	DF	(Argentina) ARG	Sensini	32	1	15+8	1	2	0	7	0
8	FW	(Croatia) CRO	Bokšić	33	8	15+4	4	4	3	10	1
20	MF	(Federal Republic of Yugoslavia) YUG	Stanković	31	5	12+4	3	4	0	11	2
21	FW	(Italy) ITA	Inzaghi	39	19	10+12	7	6	3	11	9
24	DF	(Portugal) POR	Couto	26	0	10+4	0	5	0	7	0
10	FW	(Italy) ITA	Mancini	36	3	8+12	0	7	3	9	0
33	FW	(Italy) ITA	Ravanelli	21	4	5+11	2	5	2	0	0
17	DF	(Switzerland) SUI	Gottardi	19	0	4+1	0	7	0	7	0
16	MF	(Italy) ITA	Lombardo	21	1	3+7	1	6	0	5	0
19	FW	(Sweden) SWE	Andersson	2	0	0+2	0	0	0	0	0
4	MF	(Italy) ITA	Marcolin	7	0	0	0	5	0	2	0
27	MF	(Italy) ITA	Pinzi	4	0	0	0	3	0	1	0
28	GK	(Italy) ITA	Mondini	0	0	0	0	0	0	0	0
3	DF	(Italy) ITA	Di Fiordo	0	0	0	0	0	0	0	0
12	GK	(Italy) ITA	Concetti	0	0	0	0	0	0	0	0
26	FW	(Italy) ITA	Cinelli	0	0	0	0	0	0	0	0

- Source: http://calcio-seriea.net/presenze/1999/1168/

=== Goalscorers ===
- (Chile) Marcelo Salas 12
- (Argentina) Juan Sebastián Verón 8 (2)
- (Federal Republic of Yugoslavia) Siniša Mihajlović 7 (3)
- (Italy) Simone Inzaghi 7 (1)
- (Argentina) Diego Simeone 6
- (Czech Republic) Pavel Nedvěd 5
- (Croatia) Alen Bokšić 4
