= 1994 Campeonato Nacional Primera División =

Campeonato Nacional Copa Banco del Estado
- Dates: 7 May – 18 December 1994
- Champions: Universidad de Chile (8th title)
- Relegated: Cobresal; Rangers
- 1995 Copa Libertadores: Universidad de Chile; Universidad Católica (Liguilla winners)
- 1994 Copa CONMEBOL: Universidad de Chile (Play-off winners)
- Matches: 240
- Goals: 727 (3.03 per match)
- Top goalscorer: Alberto Acosta (33 goals)
- Biggest home win: Universidad Católica 10–1 Palestino (3 September)
- Biggest away win: Rangers 1–7 Palestino (17 December)
- Highest attendance: 73,128 Universidad de Chile 1–0 Universidad Católica (4 December)
- Total attendance: 1,768,185
- Average attendance: 7,367

The Campeonato Nacional Copa Banco del Estado 1994, was the 62nd season of top-flight football in Chile. Universidad de Chile won their eight title following a 1–1 away tie at Cobresal on 18 December. Universidad Católica also qualified for the next Copa Libertadores as Liguilla winners.

== Final table ==
Pos	Team	Pld	W	D	L	GF	GA	GD	Pts	Qualification or relegation
1	Universidad de Chile	30	21	7	2	71	28	+43	49	Champions and qualified for the 1995 Copa Libertadores
2	Universidad Católica	30	21	6	3	84	26	+58	48	Qualified for the Liguilla Pre-Copa Libertadores
3	O'Higgins	30	13	13	4	45	38	+7	39	Qualified for the Liguilla Pre-Copa Libertadores
4	Colo-Colo	30	12	12	6	52	34	+18	36	Qualified for the Liguilla Pre-Copa Libertadores
5	Cobreloa	30	10	13	7	61	48	+13	33	Qualified for the Liguilla Pre-Copa Libertadores
6	Regional Atacama	30	13	5	12	51	41	+10	31	
7	Unión Española	30	14	3	13	55	49	+6	31	
8	Deportes Temuco	30	10	11	9	44	38	+6	31	
9	Deportes Antofagasta	30	11	6	13	36	45	−9	28	
10	Everton	30	11	6	13	36	55	−19	28	
11	Palestino	30	10	5	15	41	55	−14	25	
12	Deportes La Serena	30	7	11	12	32	47	−15	25	
13	Coquimbo Unido	30	8	9	13	30	45	−15	25	Promotion/relegation play-offs
14	Provincial Osorno	30	6	9	15	30	57	−27	21	Promotion/relegation play-offs
15	Cobresal	30	3	9	18	32	52	−20	15	Relegated to Segunda División
16	Rangers	30	2	11	17	27	69	−42	15	Relegated to Segunda División

Primera División Chilena
1994 champions
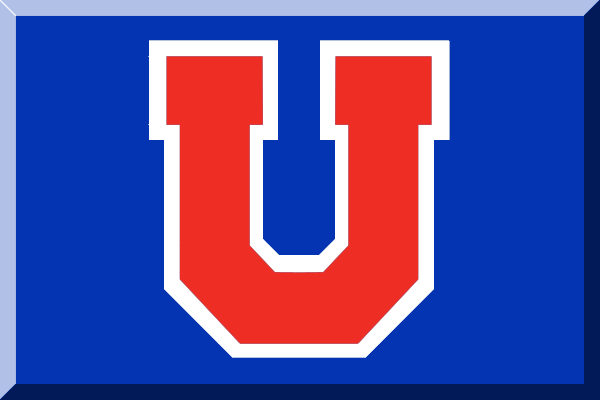
Universidad de Chile
8th title

== Results ==
Home \ Away	DAN	RAT	CLO	CSA	COL	COQ	EVE	DLS	OHI	POS	PAL	RAN	DTE	UCA	UCH	UES
Antofagasta		1–0	2–2	1–0	2–2	0–1	4–1	2–0	1–1	1–0	1–2	3–1	2–1	2–1	2–3	2–1
Atacama	0–1		1–1	3–2	1–3	1–1	1–0	4–2	1–2	4–1	3–0	4–0	2–0	2–1	1–1	1–1
Cobreloa	5–0	4–2		3–0	0–0	1–1	2–1	2–1	8–1	7–2	0–0	2–2	2–2	1–1	2–4	0–1
Cobresal	2–2	1–3	2–3		0–1	4–0	0–2	3–3	1–1	0–0	2–2	0–2	0–0	2–3	1–1	1–2
Colo-Colo	2–0	1–1	2–3	2–1		1–1	4–0	5–1	2–2	5–0	2–2	5–0	1–2	0–2	0–0	2–1
Coquimbo	1–0	0–2	3–2	1–2	1–2		2–3	1–1	3–1	1–0	0–0	1–1	0–0	0–3	0–1	1–1
Everton	1–1	1–0	3–2	0–0	1–1	1–2		2–1	2–2	1–0	1–0	1–0	1–0	2–5	1–2	0–2
La Serena	1–0	3–7	0–0	2–1	0–0	0–0	0–1		0–0	1–0	2–0	1–1	3–1	2–2	1–1	0–1
O'Higgins	2–1	1–0	0–0	1–0	1–1	3–0	5–2	1–0		1–1	1–0	4–1	0–0	1–1	3–0	2–2
Osorno	1–2	0–1	2–1	1–1	3–1	1–2	3–3	0–0	1–2		1–0	1–0	2–2	1–1	0–5	1–0
Palestino	3–1	2–1	0–0	4–1	0–2	3–1	2–0	0–2	1–3	3–1		3–2	2–1	1–5	1–3	0–3
Rangers	1–1	1–4	2–2	1–3	0–0	0–2	1–3	1–2	0–0	1–1	1–7		1–1	2–4	0–5	2–1
Temuco	2–0	2–0	6–2	3–0	1–1	2–0	1–0	2–2	1–1	4–2	1–0	1–1		0–0	0–1	5–2
U. Católica	1–0	2–0	5–1	1–0	3–0	2–1	8–1	3–0	5–1	1–1	10–1	4–1	3–0		1–0	4–1
U. Chile	5–1	3–0	0–0	2–1	3–1	3–1	1–1	1–0	3–1	5–1	2–1	1–1	4–2	1–0		5–2
U. Española	2–0	3–1	2–3	2–1	2–3	4–2	3–0	5–1	0–1	1–2	2–1	2–0	3–1	1–2	2–5	

Legend: Blue = home team win; Yellow = draw; Red = away team win.

== Topscorers ==
Pos	Name	Team	Goals
1	(Argentina) Alberto Acosta	Universidad Católica	33
2	(Chile) Marcelo Salas	Universidad de Chile	27
3	(Argentina) Alejandro Glaría	Cobreloa	24
4	(Chile) Malcom Moyano	O'Higgins	15
5	(Chile) Lukas Tudor	Universidad Católica	14
6	(Argentina) Gustavo De Luca	O'Higgins	13
	(Argentina) Juan Carlos Ibañez	Universidad de Chile	13

== Liguilla Pre-Copa Libertadores ==
20 December 1994	Colo-Colo	2 – 2	O'Higgins	Estadio Nacional, Santiago
	Castillo 26'; Mendoza 30'		Riveros 18'; J. Díaz 47'	Attendance: 25,154; Referee: F. Lamolina

20 December 1994	Universidad Católica	4 – 0	Cobreloa	Estadio Nacional, Santiago
	Acosta 22', 41', 58'; Romero 90'			Attendance: 25,154; Referee: J. Bava

23 December 1994	Cobreloa	4 – 1	O'Higgins	Estadio Nacional, Santiago
	Álvarez 19'; Glaría 62'; Cornejo 67'; Melgar 75'		Riveros 80'	Attendance: 41,785; Referee: J. Bava

23 December 1994	Universidad Católica	2 – 1	Colo-Colo	Estadio Nacional, Santiago
	Tupper 70'; Barrera 80'		Yáñez 86'	Attendance: 41,785; Referee: F. Lamolina

27 December 1994	Colo-Colo	1 – 2	Cobreloa	Estadio Nacional, Santiago
	Yáñez 24'		Glaría 4'; Álvarez 44'	Attendance: 21,065; Referee: A. Sánchez

27 December 1994	Universidad Católica	3 – 3	O'Higgins	Estadio Nacional, Santiago
	Barrera 27', 44'; Acosta 76'		Brizuela 66'; Meléndez 75' (pen.), 80' (pen.)	Attendance: 21,065; Referee: J. Castrilli

Universidad Católica also qualified for the 1995 Copa Libertadores

== Copa CONMEBOL 1994 play-off ==
16 September 1994	Universidad de Chile	1 – 0	O'Higgins	Estadio Nacional, Santiago
	Ibáñez 50'			Attendance: 15,411; Referee: I. Guerrero

Universidad de Chile qualified for the 1994 Copa CONMEBOL

== Promotion/relegation play-offs ==
December 20, 1994	Deportes Colchagua	1 – 1	Coquimbo Unido	Municipal Jorge Silva, San Fernando
	Sepúlveda 24'		Cerino 38' (pen.)	Attendance: 2,757; Referee: E. Marín

December 23, 1994	Coquimbo Unido	3 – 1	Deportes Colchagua	Francisco Sánchez Rumoroso, Coquimbo
	Cerino 25', 45'; Fuentes 26'		Dos Santos 50'	Attendance: 4,620; Referee: M. Sanchez

December 20, 1994	Fernández Vial	0 – 0	Provincial Osorno	Municipal de Concepción, Concepción
				Attendance: 6,248; Referee: R. Hormazábal

December 23, 1994	Provincial Osorno	3 – 0	Fernández Vial	Parque Schott, Osorno
	Azás 40', 46'; Ortega 43' (pen.)			Attendance: 6,500; Referee: E. Gamboa

Coquimbo Unido and Provincial Osorno stayed in the Primera División Chilena

== See also ==
- 1994 Copa Chile
