= Marcelo Salas =

Chilean footballer (born 1974)

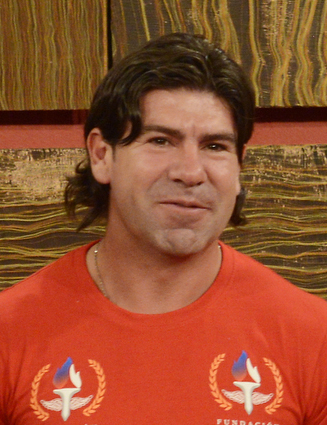
- Salas in 2015

Personal information
- Full name: José Marcelo Salas Melinao
- Date of birth: 24 December 1974 (age 51)
- Place of birth: Temuco, Chile
- Height: 1.74 m (5 ft 9 in)
- Position: Striker

Youth career
- 1989–1991: Deportes Temuco
- 1991–1993: Universidad de Chile

Senior career*
Years	Team	Apps	(Gls)
1993–1996	Universidad de Chile	77	(50)
1996–1998	River Plate	53	(24)
1998–2001	Lazio	79	(34)
2001–2006	Juventus	18	(2)
2003–2005	→ River Plate (loan)	32	(10)
2005–2006	→ Universidad de Chile (loan)	38	(18)
2006–2008	Universidad de Chile	44	(19)
Total		333	(155)

International career
1993	Chile U20		
1996	Chile Olympic	7	(8)
1994–2007	Chile	70	(37)
Medal record
Player
Universidad de Chile
Winner	Primera División of Chile	1994
Winner	Primera División of Chile	1995
River Plate
Winner	Torneo Apertura	1996
Winner	Torneo Clausura	1997
Winner	Torneo Apertura	1997
Winner	Supercopa Libertadores	1997
Winner	Torneo Clausura	2004
Lazio
Winner	Supercoppa Italiana	1998
Winner	UEFA Cup Winners' Cup	1999
Winner	UEFA Super Cup	1999
Winner	Serie A	2000
Winner	Coppa Italia	2000
Juventus
Winner	Serie A	2002
Winner	Supercoppa Italiana	2002
Winner	Serie A	2003
- * Club domestic league appearances and goals

José Marcelo Salas Melinao (Latin American Spanish: [maɾˈselo ˈsalas]; born 24 December 1974), nicknamed Matador (due to his goalscoring celebrations), El Fenómeno and Shileno, is a Chilean former footballer who played as a striker. Salas is considered the best striker in the history of Chile. He stood out during the 1990s and 2000s in clubs such as Universidad de Chile, River Plate, Lazio and Juventus. He was the captain of the Chile national team and the top scorer – scoring 45 goals in total: 37 goals for the Chile national football team (4 in World Cups, 18 in World Cup qualification processes and 15 in friendlies) and 8 goals with the Chile Olympic football team.

He played in Chile, Argentina and Italy, winning titles with each club he joined.

The IFFHS ranked him as the 31st best South American player of the 20th century, the 19th best South American forward of the 20th century and the 3rd best South American forward of the 1990s (integrating the podium with Brazilians players Ronaldo and Romário). In 1997 he ranked 3rd as the "best centre forward in the world" (after players Ronaldo and Gabriel Batistuta) and he was ranked 5th in the "Best Centre Forward" category in the RSS Award for the best footballer of the year, in 1998 and 1999. He was also named the South American Footballer of the Year in 1997.

Salas was a forward known for his physical strength, work rate, technique, left-footed finishing, and aerial ability. He maintained a strong goalscoring record throughout his career and was regarded as one of the leading forwards in international football during the late 1990s and early 2000s, drawing comparisons with Ronaldo and Gabriel Batistuta.

Salas is considered one of the greatest players in the history of Universidad de Chile, an icon for the football team River Plate of Argentina, and one of the greatest foreign players in Lazio's history. He played for the Chile national football team at the 1998 FIFA World Cup in France, where he scored four goals in four matches, leading his team to the second round of the competition. Additionally, Salas played for the Chile national football team at two Copa América tournaments, helping his team to reach fourth place in the 1999 edition of the tournament.

Currently, after his retirement as a football player, he has continued linked to the sport, being since May 2013 the president of Deportes Temuco (a club that on that date absorbed Unión Temuco, owned by him from 2008 to April 2013). The club is now in 2nd division of Chile, the Primera B.

== Club career ==
=== Universidad de Chile ===
Born in Temuco, Salas played for the Deportes Temuco youth team until his father took him to Santiago de Chile to be incorporated into the Universidad de Chile team.

Salas joined the Universidad de Chile team in 1993 and debuted on 4 January 1994 in a match against Cobreloa where he scored a goal. Finally, Salas was consolidated in the match against Colo Colo at the National Stadium, where he scored a Hat-trick in the 4–1 victory. His great performances quickly led the university fans to give him the nickname of "Matador" due to his cold blood when defining, also inspired by the song of the same name by the Argentine musical group Los Fabulosos Cadillacs, which at that time was fashionable in Latin America. It was also at this time that he patented his particular way of celebrating goals: he put one leg down, bowed his head, stretched his right arm and pointed his index finger towards the sky.

Salas helped the team win back-to-back titles in 1994 and 1995, he was an essential player for the Universidad de Chile team, as he was their top scorer in both seasons (27 goals in the first season and 17 goals in the second season). Leaving a trail of 76 goals which included a strong 1996 campaign in the Copa Libertadores.

=== River Plate ===
Later in 1996, Salas moved to Argentina to play in River Plate team of the Argentine first division of football. On 30 September 1996 he scored his first goal, in a match played against Boca Juniors at the La Bombonera stadium. In November, he made a late substitute appearance in the 1–0 defeat to Juventus in the 1996 Intercontinental Cup final. From 1996 to 1998 Salas scored 31 goals in 67 games, helping River to win the Torneo de Apertura 1996 (where he scored two goals in the 3–0 win over Vélez Sarsfield that made him champion), the Clausura 1997, the Apertura 1997 (scoring the title goal against Argentinos Juniors), and the 1997 Supercopa Libertadores, where he scored the 2 goals in the final against São Paulo that gave the millionaire club the cup. In addition, he was elected the Best Footballer of the season in Argentina and South American Footballer of the Year in 1997. These accomplishments would cement his legacy in Argentina as one of its greatest foreign born players earning the nickname, "El shileno (sic) Salas".

The Argentine team valued his transfer at US$30,000,000 as the English football club Manchester United (The coach Alex Ferguson wanted a player with the characteristics of Ronaldo and Marcelo Salas to replace the retirement of Eric Cantona, Ferguson traveled 14,000 miles to sign Salas, but River Plate refused to sell him.), in addition to great clubs from Italy and Spain for hiring him.

=== Lazio ===
On 1 February 1998, thanks to his good performances both in Argentina and in the Chile national football team, he was sold to SS Lazio in Italy for US$20.5 million. becoming the highest transfer in history at that time, after Ronaldo, Rivaldo and Denilson (to Inter Milan from Italy, Barcelona and Betis from Spain, respectively).

Salas played in Italy for five years: three years with SS Lazio (1998–2001), a key catalyst in helping turn around a Lazio team that hadn't won a Scudetto since the 1973–1974 season. He made his debut for Lazio on 12 August 1998 against the UEFA Champions League champion, the Real Madrid of Spain, where he scored the second goal of his team, in the Teresa Herrera Trophy. His official debut was for the Supercoppa italiana where his team won the competition after winning 2–1 over Juventus FC, on 29 August 1998. With Salas in the team, successes in Italian football returned for the whole of the Italian capital, after 25 years. He scored his first goal for Serie A playing for Lazio a few days later against Inter Milan. With Lazio he won Serie A (being the team's top scorer with 12 goals), a Coppa Italia, two Supercoppa Italiana, a UEFA Cup Winners' Cup and a UEFA Super Cup, scoring the match's only goal in the latter, in a 1–0 win over Manchester United.

Salas quickly became an idol of the Lazio tifosi, who would dedicate songs to him. The most prominent being "Matador, Matador, che ce frega de Ronaldo noi c'avemo er Matador" (Matador, Matador, what do we care about Ronaldo if we have the Matador).

After rejecting offers of US$30,000,000 from important football club as: Manchester United, Chelsea, Arsenal, Liverpool, Barcelona, Parma, AC Milan and Inter Milan. was in negotiations with Real Madrid to become, together with Zinedine Zidane, one of the two great "meringues" signings of 2001. However, the transfer failed, largely due to the exorbitant sum that the Spanish club had invested in the signing of Zidane. Finally, that same year he signed for Juventus, with the club paying €25,000,000 (US$28,500,000) for him, which at the time was the most expensive transfer of a Chilean player.

=== Juventus ===
In 2001, he was transferred to Juventus for 55 billion lire (€28.5 million by fixed exchange rate; 22 billion lire cash plus Darko Kovačević). His stay in Turin was cut short due to a torn ACL in his right knee in a Serie A match against Bologna in October 2001. Salas endured one of the worst moments of his career at the club; he was hampered by injuries, including a further issue with his knee meniscus the following season. During his two seasons at the club, he was only able to take part in 31 games, scoring just four goals across all competitions, despite winning consecutive Serie A titles and the 2002 Supercoppa Italiana, providing an assist for Alessandro Del Piero's opening goal in the 2–1 victory over Parma in the latter competition. He scored his first goal for the club from a penalty in September 2001, the match-winning goal in a 3–2 comeback home win over Chievo in Serie A. In the Derby della Mole against cross-city rivals Torino the following month, however, he missed a potentially match-winning penalty as Torino came back from 3–0 to tie the match 3–3. His final goal for the club came from a penalty, in a 2–0 win against Reggina in December 2002, in the first leg of the round of 16 of the Coppa Italia.

=== Return to River Plate ===
After Juventus unsuccessfully tried to transfer him to such high-profile European clubs as Manchester United, Chelsea, Liverpool, Barcelona, A.C. Milan, and Sporting Lisbon (in exchange for the transfer of a young Cristiano Ronaldo), in 2003 he was loaned back to River Plate.

Hailed as "Saint Matador" by fans, Salas stood out especially in that year's Copa Sudamericana, but could not prevent his team's defeat in the final against Cienciano of Peru, despite scoring the tying goal 3–3 in the first leg. However, he later achieved a new title: the 2004 Clausura.

A year later, he helped River Plate reach the semifinals of the 2005 Copa Libertadores, scoring a hat-trick against Liga de Quito. In his second stay at River Plate, Salas scored 17 goals in 43 games.

Marcelo Salas is regarded as one of the greatest players in the history of River Plate, along with Ángel Labruna, Enzo Francescoli, Ramón Díaz, Norberto Alonso, Ubaldo Fillol and Amadeo Carrizo. In addition, he was one of the few foreign players who have worn the Millonarios captain armband.

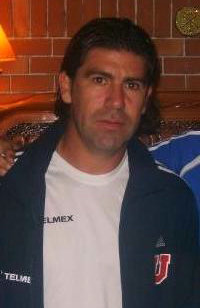
Salas in 2008

=== Universidad de Chile ===
Between 2004 and 2005 he received offers to return to European football from Barcelona in Spain and Inter Milan in Italy, among others.

In late July 2005, it was confirmed that he would return to his original team, Universidad de Chile, on a temporary deal from Juventus.

Salas announced his retirement on 28 November 2008, at the age of 33. Before the 23 November game where the Universidad de Chile beat Cobreloa 3–2, with two goals from Salas at the National Stadium.

=== Retirement ===
Salas played his last game on 2 June 2009. Amongst the invited players were his friends from the 1993–1996 Universidad de Chile squads, River Plate, Juventus, plus members of Chile's France '98 World Cup squad. More than 60,000 people attended to pay him one final salute. Playing for both sides, he managed to score three goals.

== International career ==
Salas represented Chile at under-20 level in 1993 alongside players such as Francisco Rojas, Claudio Lizama and Claudio Villan.

On 30 April 1994 at the National Stadium, Salas made his debut for the Chile national football team at age 19, scoring his first international goal in a 3–3 draw with Argentina of Diego Maradona, who was preparing for the World Cup 1994.

In 1995 his team won the Canada Cup, where Salas scored the "goal of the victory" in the final match against Canada (2–1).

During the 1998 World Cup qualification campaign, Salas scored 11 goals. He also scored memorable goals: against Argentina of local, in Quito of visit against Ecuador and of local against Uruguay, including hat-tricks against Colombia and Peru, and a goal in the final match against Bolivia. Against Peru, he became the youngest Chilean footballer to wear the captain's belt, at just 22 years old.

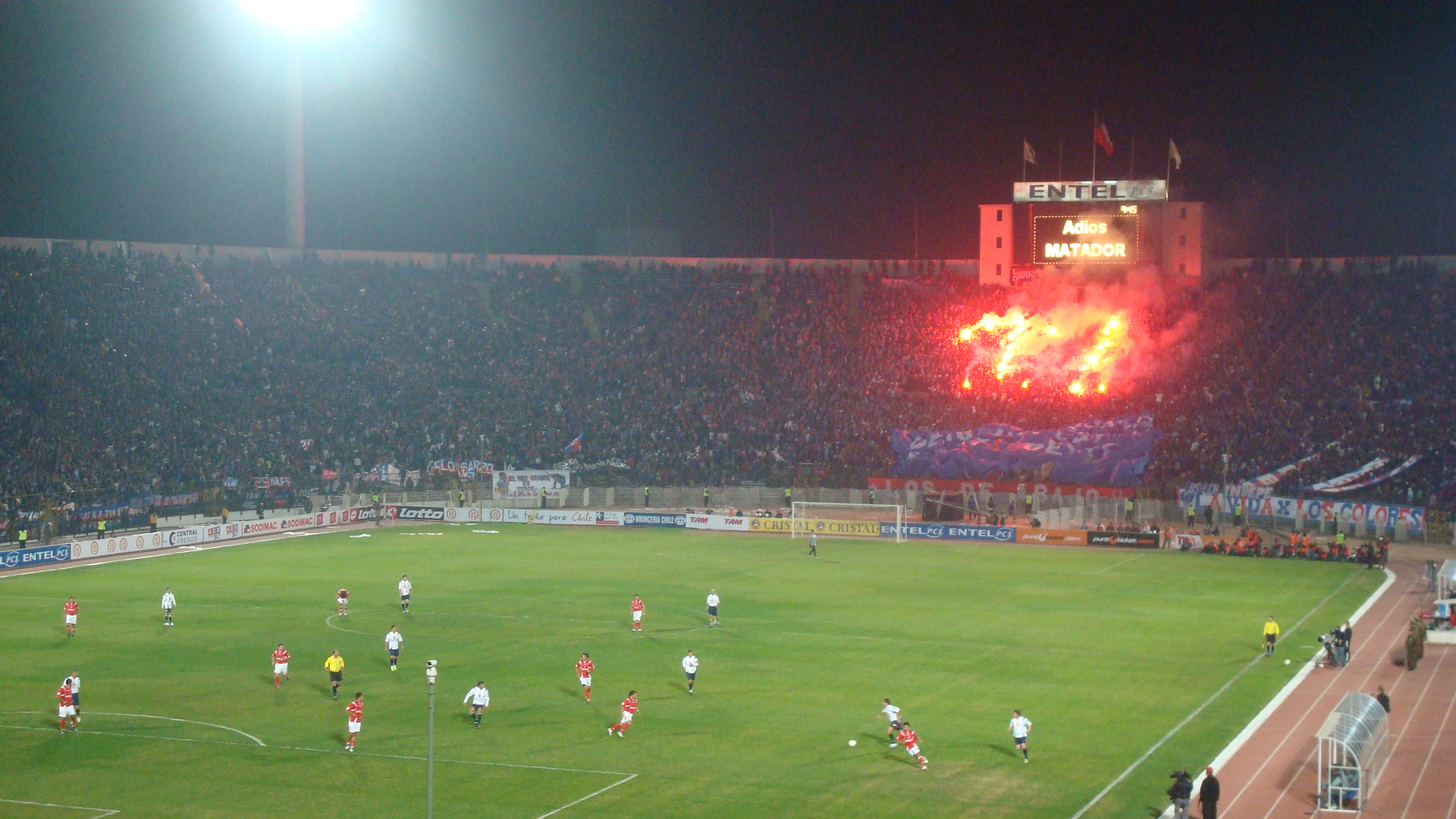
Salas' farewell match on 2 June 2009 at the Estadio Nacional

During the training for the 1998 FIFA World Cup in France, Chile played a friendly match with England in front of about 65,000 people at the legendary Wembley Stadium on 11 February 1998. In a memorable match, Chile won 2–0 with goals of "The Killer". The first, without letting the ball touch the ground after a pass of more than 60 meters. The second, a penalty that he created dribbling the English defender Sol Campbell.

In 1998, Marcelo Salas had an outstanding performance in the 1998 FIFA World Cup, reaching the 16th round of the tournament. He scored 4 goals: two against Italy, one against Austria and one against Brazil positioning himself as the third-best scorer of the World Cup in that year, along with Brazilian striker Ronaldo, being only 1 away from the bronze boot, and 2 from the golden boot.

In 1999, Chile national football team reached the semi-finals of the Copa América, where they won fourth place.

On 15 August 2000, Salas was the great figure in Chile 3–0 victory over Brazil, scoring a great goal and being the most important player of the match, played in the 2002 World Cup qualification.

Due to his injury problems, Salas's appearances for Chile were limited after 2001. He scored four goals in nine matches during the failed 2002 World Cup qualification campaign and during the 2006 World Cup qualification. He surpassed his attacking partner Iván Zamorano as the nation's all-time leading scorer for the second time (he had previously done so in 1998) with his 35th goal against Bolivia.

On 18 November 2007, during a 2010 World Cup qualification match against Uruguay, Marcelo Salas scored his last 2 final goals at the majestic Estadio Centenario, the first with a header after a Carlos Villanueva cross and the second by penalty kick.

== Career statistics ==
=== Club ===
Appearances and goals by club, season and competition
Club	Season	League			National cup (Note: Includes Copa Chile, Coppa Italia)		Continental		Other		Total	
Club	Season	Division	Apps	Goals	Apps	Goals	Apps	Goals	Apps	Goals	Apps	Goals
Universidad de Chile	1993	Chilean Primera División	15	1					–		15	1
Universidad de Chile	1994	Chilean Primera División	25	27	15	12	6	2	–		46	41
Universidad de Chile	1995	Chilean Primera División	27	17	4	0	7	5	–		38	22
Universidad de Chile	1996	Chilean Primera División	10	5	5	2	12	5	–		27	12
River Plate	1996–97	Argentine Primera División	26	11	–		4	0	–		30	11
River Plate	1997–98	Argentine Primera División	27	13	–		10	7	–		37	20
River Plate	Total		53	24	–		14	7	–		67	31
Lazio	1998–99	Serie A	30	15	6	5	6 (Note: Appearances in UEFA Cup Winners' Cup)	4	1 (Note: Appearance in Supercoppa Italiana)	0	43	24
Lazio	1999–2000	Serie A	28	12	3	0	10 (Note: Appearances in UEFA Champions League)	4	1 (Note: Appearance in UEFA Super Cup)	1	42	17
Lazio	2000–01	Serie A	21	7	2	1	9	0	0	0	32	8
Lazio	Total		79	34	11	6	25	8	2	1	107	49
Juventus	2001–02	Serie A	7	1	2	0	2	0	–		11	1
Juventus	2002–03	Serie A	11	1	4	1	4	1	1	0	20	3
Juventus	Total		18	2	6	1	6	1	1	0	31	4
River Plate	2003–04	Argentine Primera División	17	6	–		4	2	–		21	8
River Plate	2004–05	Argentine Primera División	15	4	–		7	5	–		22	9
River Plate	Total		32	10	–		11	7	–		43	17
Universidad de Chile	2005	Chilean Primera División	10	5	–				–		10	5
Universidad de Chile	2006	Chilean Primera División	28	13	–				–		28	13
Universidad de Chile	2007	Chilean Primera División	14	8	–				–		14	8
Universidad de Chile	2008	Chilean Primera División	30	11					–		30	11
Universidad de Chile	Total		82	37	–				–		82	37
Career total			333	155	42	21	81	34	3	1	458	248

=== International ===
Chile
Year	Apps	Goals
1994	3	1
1995	12	4
1996	11	6
1997	7	9
1998	10	10
1999	5	0
2000	7	2
2001	2	2
2002	0	0
2003	0	0
2004	4	0
2005	3	1
2006	0	0
2007	6	2
Total	70	37

International goals

Score and Result lists Chile's goals first

#	Date	Venue	Opponent	Score	Competition
1	18 May 1994	Santiago	Argentina	3–3	International match
2	29 March 1995	Los Angeles	Mexico	2–1	International match
3	22 April 1995	Temuco	Iceland	1–1	International match
4	28 May 1995	Commonwealth Stadium, Edmonton	Canada	2–1	Canada Cup
5	11 October 1995	Concepción	Canada	2–0	International match
6	14 February 1996	Coquimbo	Peru	4–0	International match
7	26 May 1996	Santiago	Bolivia	2–0	International match
8	26 May 1996	Santiago	Bolivia	2–0	International match
9	6 July 1996	Santiago	Ecuador	4–1	1998 FIFA World Cup qualification
10	25 August 1996	Liberia	Costa Rica	1–1	International match
11	12 November 1996	Santiago	Uruguay	1–0	1998 FIFA World Cup qualification
12	8 June 1997	Quito	Ecuador	1–1	1998 FIFA World Cup qualification
13	5 July 1997	Santiago	Colombia	4–1	1998 FIFA World Cup qualification
14	5 July 1997	Santiago	Colombia	4–1	1998 FIFA World Cup qualification
15	5 July 1997	Santiago	Colombia	4–1	1998 FIFA World Cup qualification
16	10 September 1997	Santiago	Argentina	1–2	1998 FIFA World Cup qualification
17	12 October 1997	Santiago	Peru	4–0	1998 FIFA World Cup qualification
18	12 October 1997	Santiago	Peru	4–0	1998 FIFA World Cup qualification
19	12 October 1997	Santiago	Peru	4–0	1998 FIFA World Cup qualification
20	16 November 1997	Santiago	Bolivia	3–0	1998 FIFA World Cup qualification
21	11 February 1998	Wembley Stadium, London	England	2–0	International match
22	11 February 1998	Wembley Stadium, London	England	2–0	International match
23	22 April 1998	Santiago	Colombia	2–2	International match
24	24 May 1998	Santiago	Uruguay	2–2	International match
25	31 May 1998	Montélimar	Tunisia	3–2	International match
26	4 June 1998	Avignon	Morocco	1–1	International match
27	11 June 1998	Parc Lescure, Bordeaux	Italy	2–2	1998 FIFA World Cup
28	11 June 1998	Parc Lescure, Bordeaux	Italy	2–2	1998 FIFA World Cup
29	17 June 1998	Stade Geoffroy-Guichard, Saint-Étienne	Austria	1–1	1998 FIFA World Cup
30	27 June 1998	Parc des Princes, Paris	Brazil	1–4	1998 FIFA World Cup
31	29 June 2000	Estadio Nacional de Chile, Santiago	Paraguay	3–1	2002 FIFA World Cup qualification
32	15 August 2000	Estadio Nacional de Chile, Santiago	Brazil	3–0	2002 FIFA World Cup qualification
33	14 August 2001	Estadio Nacional de Chile, Santiago	Bolivia	2–2	2002 FIFA World Cup qualification
34	14 August 2001	Estadio Nacional de Chile, Santiago	Bolivia	2–2	2002 FIFA World Cup qualification
35	4 June 2005	Estadio Nacional de Chile, Santiago	Bolivia	3–1	2006 FIFA World Cup qualification
36	18 November 2007	Estadio Centenario, Montevideo	Uruguay	2–2	2010 FIFA World Cup qualification
37	18 November 2007	Estadio Centenario, Montevideo	Uruguay	2–2	2010 FIFA World Cup qualification

== Personal life ==
He is the nephew-in-law of the former Chile international footballer Sergio Messen since his wife, Carolina Messen, is Sergio's niece.

His maternal surname, Melinao, means "four lions" in Mapudungun.

Salas gave his backing to José Antonio Kast in the run-up to the 2021 Chilean presidential election.

== Honours ==
=== Club ===
Universidad de Chile

- Primera División de Chile: 1994, 1995

River Plate

- Argentine Primera División: 1996 Apertura, 1997 Clausura, 1997 Apertura, 2004 Clausura
- Supercopa Libertadores: 1997

Lazio

- Serie A: 1999–2000
- Coppa Italia: 1999–2000
- Supercoppa Italiana: 1998
- UEFA Cup Winners' Cup: 1998–99
- UEFA Super Cup: 1999

Juventus

- Serie A: 2001–02, 2002–03
- Supercoppa Italiana: 2002

=== Individual ===
- Copa Chile Top scorer: 1994
- America's Ideal Team: 1996, 1997
- South American Footballer of the Year: 1997
- Argentine Footballer of the Year: 1997
- Olimpia Award: 1997
- Chile's Best Athlete Award: 1997
- 3rd "Best Centre Forward in the World" RSS Award for the best footballer of the year: 1997
- Chilean Footballer of the Year: 1997, 1998
- Included within the 10 figures of 1998 FIFA World Cup
- 5th "Best Centre Forward in the World" RSS Award for the best footballer of the year: 1998
- Integra the Rest of the world in sports and games 1998
- 5th "Best Centre Forward in the World" RSS Award for the best footballer of the year: 1999
- Best South American striker of the 1990s by IFFHS: No. 3
- Best South American striker of the 20th century by IFFHS: No. 19
- Best South American player of the 20th century by IFFHS: No. 31
- Order of the Liberator General San Martín: 2009
- Included in the Top 10 Best Scorers in the History of South American Soccer
- 7th best South American left-foot soccer player in history ("Bleacher Report" magazine)
- 4th best striker in the history of South America of the 1990s
- Included in the best 50 soccer players in history representative of each country by These Football Times (The Guardian)
- Included in the 50 Greatest South American Footballers of All Time: #27

== Tributes ==
In the year 2004 the River Plate club of Argentina honored and immortalized the figure of Marcelo Salas with a portrait of the image of the "Matador" in the dressing rooms of the Monumental de Nuñez Stadium, being included among the most prominent idols in the club's history. Also in the year 2009, at the inauguration of the museum of the Argentine club, the goals of Marcelo Salas are portrayed in videos and images (the goals of the titles of the Apertura 1996, Clausura 1997, Apertura 1997, Supercopa Sudamericana 1997, among others), in addition to the shirts and boots that Marcelo Salas wore while he played in River Plate.

In the year 2013 Marcelo Salas received a tribute from the English Football Federation at Wembley Stadium for his "excellent performance" in the England vs Chile match from 11 February from 1998. Where his first goal of that match is portrayed in the museum of said stadium, as one of the best goals in all history scored at Wembley Stadium.

=== Players tribute ===
Long is the list of public figures whose idol is the "Matador" where several of them have decided to honor Marcelo Salas by imitating his typical celebration after scoring a goal: knee to the ground, head bowed and one arm pointing to the sky. Among the players who have Salas as an idol, the following stand out:

Football players

- CHI Alexis Sánchez
- CHI Arturo Vidal
- CHI Charles Aránguiz
- CHI David Pizarro
- FRA David Trezeguet
- CHI Eduardo Vargas
- ARG Gastón Fernández
- ARG Gonzalo Higuaín
- CHI Humberto Suazo
- ARG Javier Saviola
- CHI José Luis Villanueva
- CHI Marcelo Díaz
- ARG Marcelo Larrondo
- CHI Mauricio Isla
- ARG Pablo Aimar
- COL Radamel Falcao
- ARG Santiago Solari
- CHI Carla Guerrero
- CHI Christiane Endler
- CHI Camila Pavez
- ARG Maximiliano Salas

Golfer

- CHI Nicole Perrot

Tennis players

- ARG Guillermo Coria
- ARG Facundo Bagnis
- ARG Federico Coria
- CHI Felipe Arevalo

=== Tributes from the world of music ===
On 16 October 1997, Jay Kay, lead singer of the English band Jamiroquai, paid tribute to Marcelo Salas, in his presentation with the band at the Teatro Caupolicán, wearing the traditional shirt number 11 from Salas where he celebrated as the Matador on stage

On 11 February 1998 the Irish band U2 performed in Chile for the first time. That day the vocalist and leader Bono went on stage at the National Stadium along with the rest of the members wearing Marcelo Salas' jersey number 11, where at the same time Salas' goals playing for Chile against England at Wembley Stadium were displayed on a giant screen.
