= Alejandro Bernal =

Alejandro Bernal may refer to:

- Alejandro Bernal (footballer, born 1988), Colombian footballer
- Alejandro Bernal (Chilean footballer) (born 1969)
