= Francisco Rojas (footballer, born 1974) =

Chilean footballer

Personal information
- Full name: Francisco Ulises Rojas Rojas
- Date of birth: 22 July 1974 (age 52)
- Place of birth: La Serena, Chile
- Height: 1.72 m (5 ft 7 1/2 in)
- Position: Left-back

Youth career
- Academia Santa Inés
- Deportes La Serena

Senior career*
Years	Team	Apps	(Gls)
1993	Deportes La Serena	23	(0)
1994–1995	Colo-Colo	41	(1)
1996	Tenerife	7	(1)
1996–2000	Colo-Colo	113	(7)
2001–2005	Sturm Graz	103	(13)
2006	Unión Española	21	(0)
2007–2011	Deportes La Serena	59	(0)
Total		366	(22)

International career
1993	Chile U20		
1995–2005	Chile	31	(0)
- * Club domestic league appearances and goals

Francisco Ulises Rojas Rojas (born 22 July 1974) is a Chilean former football player. He played most of his career as a left-back, despite being right-footed.

== International career ==
Rojas represented Chile at under-20 level in 1993 alongside players such as Claudio Lizama, Claudio Villan and Marcelo Salas.

At senior level, Rojas was capped 31 times for the Chile national team between 1995 and 2005, including three games at the 1998 FIFA World Cup.

== Personal life ==
His common nickname is "Murci", shortage of "Murciélago" ("Bat").

In 2012, Rojas took part in the Chilean reality show Mundos Opuestos.

In 2021, Rojas was a candidate to councillor for La Pintana commune.

== Honours ==
Colo-Colo

- Primera División de Chile (3): 1996, 1997, 1998
