= 2004–05 Brescia Calcio season =

Brescia
2004–05 season
- Manager: Gianni De Biasi; Alberto Cavasin
- Stadium: Stadio Mario Rigamonti
- Serie A: 19th (relegated)
- Coppa Italia: Second stage
- Highest home attendance: 16,504 (vs. Juventus)
- Lowest home attendance: 5.627 (vs. Reggina)
- Average home league attendance: 7,749

== Season summary ==
After 5 seasons in Serie A, Brescia were relegated.

== Kit ==
Italian company Kappa became Brescia's kit manufacturers. Banca Lombarda remained sponsors.

== Players ==
Squad at end of season

Note: Flags indicate national team as defined under FIFA eligibility rules; some limited exceptions apply. Players may hold more than one non-FIFA nationality.

No.	Pos.	Nation	Player
1	GK	ITA	Luca Castellazzi
2	DF	CRC	Gilberto Martínez
3	MF	LTU	Marius Stankevičius
4	MF	ITA	Roberto Guana
5	DF	ITA	Daniele Adani
6	DF	ITA	Davide Zoboli
7	MF	ITA	Omar Milanetto
8	FW	ITA	Marco Delvecchio
9	FW	ITA	Giuseppe Sculli (on loan from Chievo)
11	MF	ITA	Simone Del Nero
14	MF	SVK	Marek Hamšík
15	DF	ITA	Marco Zambelli
16	DF	PAR	Víctor Hugo Mareco
17	MF	SUI	Johan Vonlanthen (on loan from PSV Eindhoven (Note: Vonlanthen was born in Santa Marta, Colombia, but qualified to represent Switzerland through his father and made his international debut for Switzerland in June 2004.))
18	MF	AUT	Markus Schopp

No.	Pos.	Nation	Player
19	FW	ITA	Luigi Di Pasquale
20	DF	ITA	Maurizio Domizzi (on loan from Sampdoria)
21	MF	SUI	Fabrizio Zambrella
22	GK	ITA	Federico Agliardi
23	DF	ITA	Simone Dallamano
24	MF	ITA	Daniele Berretta
26	MF	ITA	Jonathan Bachini
27	MF	MAR	Abderrazzak Jadid
28	DF	ITA	Giordano Paganotto
29	FW	ITA	Andrea Caracciolo
31	FW	DEN	Mark Nygaard
32	MF	ITA	Luigi Di Biagio
33	DF	CMR	Pierre Womé
40	MF	ITA	Daniele Mannini

=== Left club during season ===
Note: Flags indicate national team as defined under FIFA eligibility rules; some limited exceptions apply. Players may hold more than one non-FIFA nationality.

No. / Pos. / Nation / Player; 24 / MF / ITA / Francesco Marfia (to Udinese)	No. / Pos. / Nation / Player; 25 / MF / ARG / Matías Almeyda (to Quilmes)

== Competitions ==
=== Serie A ===
Pos	Team	Pld	W	D	L	GF	GA	GD	Pts	Qualification or relegation
16	Fiorentina	38	9	15	14	42	50	−8	42	
17	Parma	38	10	12	16	48	65	−17	42	Relegation tie-breaker
18	Bologna (R)	38	9	15	14	33	36	−3	42	Serie B after tie-breaker
19	Brescia (R)	38	11	8	19	37	54	−17	41	Relegation to Serie B
20	Atalanta (R)	38	8	11	19	34	45	−11	35	Relegation to Serie B

Source: 2004–05 Serie A, RSSSF.com, Soccerway
Rules for classification: 1) Points; 2) Head-to-head points; 3) Head-to-head goal difference; 4) Goal difference; 5) Goals scored; 6) Draw. (Note: Head-to-head record is used only after all the matches between the teams in question have been played).
(R) Relegated
