= Claudio Villan =

Chilean footballer (born 1973)

Personal information
- Full name: Claudio Andrés Villan Cerpa
- Date of birth: 18 August 1973 (age 53)
- Place of birth: Santiago, Chile
- Position: Midfielder

Youth career
- Universidad de Chile

Senior career*
Years	Team	Apps	(Gls)
1994	Unión Santa Cruz	14	(1)
1995	Provincial Osorno	15	(0)
1996	O'Higgins	10	(0)
1997	Deportes Ovalle		
1998	Unión Española		
1999	Deportes Melipilla	9	(0)
2003	Persik Kediri		
2004	Perseden Denpasar		
2005–2006	Persekaba Badung		(2)

International career
1993	Chile U20		
- * Club domestic league appearances and goals

Claudio Andrés Villan Cerpa (born 18 August 1973) is a Chilean former professional footballer who played as a midfielder for clubs in Chile and Indonesia.

== Club career ==
A midfielder, Villan played for Unión Santa Cruz, Provincial Osorno, O'Higgins, Deportes Ovalle, Unión Española and Deportes Melipilla.

Then, he moved to Indonesia, where he played for Persik Kediri, where he coincided with his compatriots Juan Carlos Tapia and Alejandro Bernal, Perseden Denpasar and Persekaba Badung. As a member of Persik Kediri, he won the league title in 2003.

== International career ==
Villan represented Chile at under-20 level in 1993 alongside players such as Francisco Rojas, Claudio Lizama and Marcelo Salas.

== Honours ==
Persik Kediri

- Liga Indonesia Premier Division: 2003
