= Juan Carlos Tapia =

Chilean footballer (born 1977)

Personal information
- Full name: Juan Carlos Tapia Tapia
- Date of birth: 8 August 1977 (age 49)
- Place of birth: Chile
- Height: 1.75 m (5 ft 9 in)
- Position: Defender

Youth career
- Unión Española

Senior career*
Years	Team	Apps	(Gls)
1996–1997	Unión Española	19	(0)
2000–2001	Deportes La Serena		
2002–2003	Unión San Felipe	2	(0)
2003–2004	Persik Kediri		
2005	PSSB Bireuen		
2006	Pelita KS		
- * Club domestic league appearances and goals

Juan Carlos Tapia Tapia (born 8 August 1977) is a Chilean former professional footballer who played as a defender for clubs in Chile and Indonesia.

== Career ==
A product of Unión Española youth system, Tapia was well known by his impetuosity. He made appearances for the club in 1996 and 1997.

In Chile, he also played for Deportes La Serena and Unión San Felipe (2002–03).

In 2003 he went to Indonesia and joined Persik Kediri coincided with his compatriots Claudio Villan and Alejandro Bernal and won the league title in 2003. He also scored a goal in the 2004 AFC Champions League against Seongnam FC.

He also played for PSSB Bireuen and Pelita KS.

== Personal life ==
Previously to move to Indonesia, Tapia worked as a ceramic installer in his homeland.

== Honours ==
Persik Kediri

- Liga Indonesia Premier Division: 2003
