= Matías Almeyda =

Argentine footballer and manager

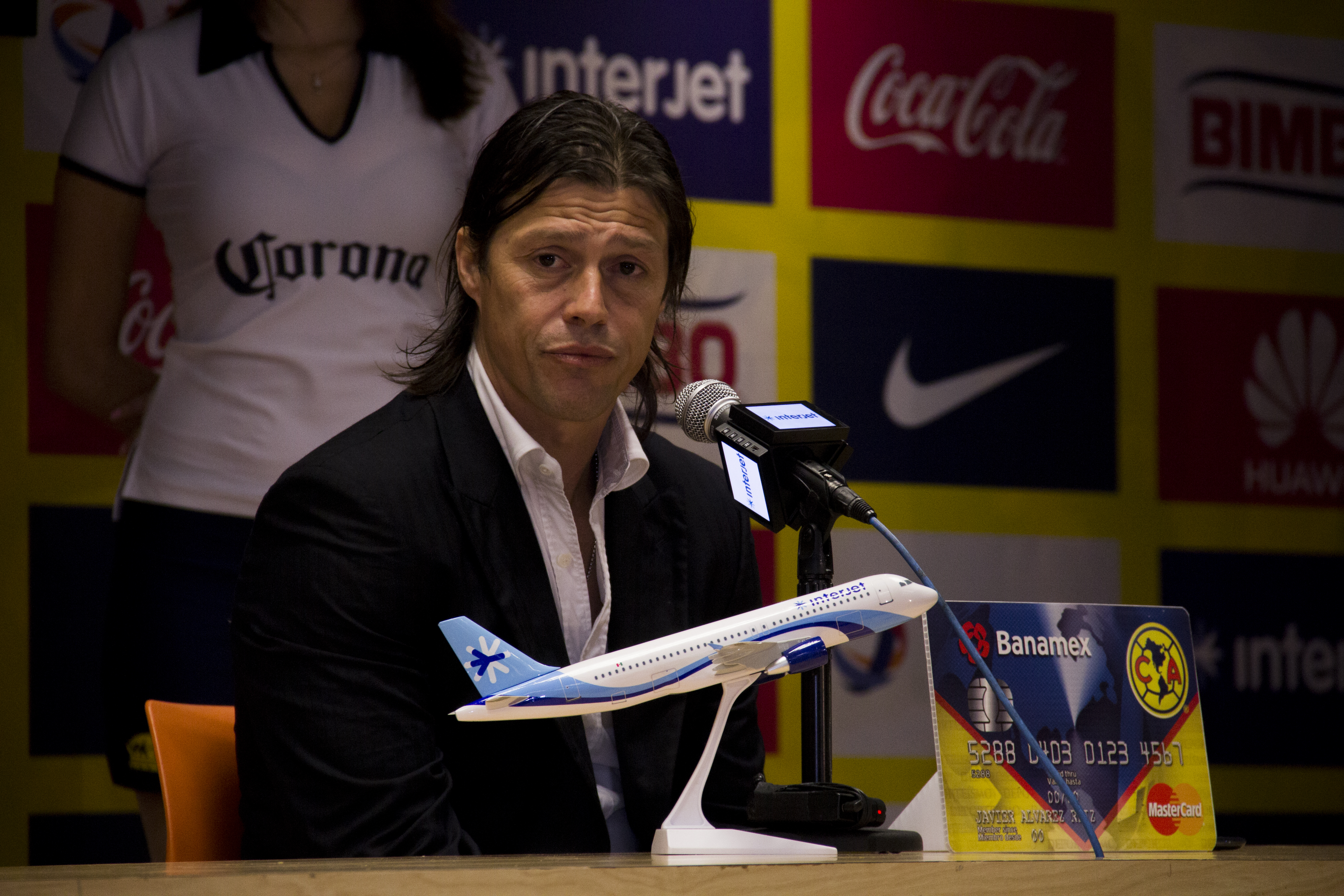
- Almeyda in 2015

Personal information
- Full name: Matías Jesús Almeyda
- Date of birth: 21 December 1973 (age 52)
- Place of birth: Azul, Argentina
- Height: 1.74 m (5 ft 9 in)
- Position: Defensive midfielder

Team information
- Current team: Monterrey (head coach)

Senior career*
Years	Team	Apps	(Gls)
1991–1996	River Plate	68	(3)
1996–1997	Sevilla	28	(0)
1997–2000	Lazio	63	(2)
2000–2002	Parma	34	(0)
2002–2004	Inter Milan	27	(1)
2004–2005	Brescia	5	(0)
2005	Quilmes	10	(0)
2007	Lyn	2	(0)
2009	Fénix	4	(0)
2009–2011	River Plate	62	(0)
Total		303	(5)

International career
1992	Argentina U20	1	(0)
1995–1996	Argentina U23	13	(0)
1996–2003	Argentina	40	(1)

Managerial career
- 2011–2012: River Plate
- 2013–2015: Banfield
- 2015–2018: Guadalajara
- 2018–2022: San Jose Earthquakes
- 2022–2025: AEK Athens
- 2025–2026: Sevilla
- 2026–: Monterrey
Medal record
Men's football
Representing Argentina
Olympic Games
Silver medal – second place	1996 Atlanta	Team
- * Club domestic league appearances and goals

Matías Jesús Almeyda (Spanish pronunciation: [maˈti.as xeˈsus alˈmejða]; born 21 December 1973) is an Argentine professional football manager and former player. He is the current head coach of Liga MX club Monterrey in Mexico.

Ironically nicknamed El Pelado ("the bald one") in reference to his long hair, Almeyda played for nine clubs across four countries over a career spanning two decades. He is most closely associated with River Plate, where he made his professional debut and later won four Primera División titles along with the Copa Libertadores. After retiring from playing, he took charge of the club, guiding them back to the top flight following their relegation the previous year.

He represented Argentina at the FIFA World Cup in 1998 and 2002, and at the 1996 Summer Olympics, where he won a silver medal in football.

== Playing career ==
=== Club ===
Born in Azul, Buenos Aires Province, Almeyda began his career with River Plate, making his professional debut on February 21, 1992, in a match against Unión de Santa Fe. During his time at the club, he contributed to winning four Primera División titles and the Copa Libertadores.

In August 1996, he was transferred to Sevilla in La Liga, with his boyhood club receiving a record fee of $9 million. Despite playing regularly, Almeyda struggled during his single season with the club. Following Sevilla's relegation, he joined Lazio in Serie A, where he spent three seasons. He became an integral part of the club's golden era, helping them capture six trophies, including the domestic double in the 1999–2000 season.

In June 2000, Almeyda moved to Parma for a reported fee of $23 million. He spent two seasons there and won the Coppa Italia in the 2001–02 season. In July 2002, he moved to Inter Milan, and two years later he joined Brescia. After Brescia's relegation, he returned to Argentina to play for Quilmes. He retired in July 2005, citing exhaustion as the reason.

Almeyda came out of retirement in March 2007 to join Norwegian club Lyn, appearing in four matches before leaving the team and retiring once again. In January 2009, he briefly signed with Fénix in Argentina's fourth division. Later that year, in August, he rejoined River Plate during a troubled era for the club that culminated in relegation. Almeyda retired on June 22, 2011, and just five days later he was appointed River Plate's manager.

=== International ===
Almeyda won 35 caps for Argentina over the course of seven years, his debut coming in April 1996 against Bolivia. Shortly after, he helped the Olympic side to the silver medal at the Summer Olympics in Atlanta.

Subsequently, Almeyda was picked in the squad for the 1998 FIFA World Cup in France. He started in all five games during the tournament, as the country reached the quarter–finals.

After Marcelo Bielsa became Argentina's manager, Almeyda did not get as much playing time. He was, however, selected for the 2002 World Cup which was held in South Korea and Japan, and played in the 1–1 group stage draw against Sweden.

== Managerial career ==
=== River Plate ===
On June 27, 2011, five days after retiring as a player, Almeyda became the manager of River Plate with the aim of returning the club to Argentina's top division. On June 23, 2012, River achieved promotion back to the Primera División under his leadership. Following an uneven campaign upon their return to the top tier, Almeyda resigned on November 28, 2012.

=== Banfield ===
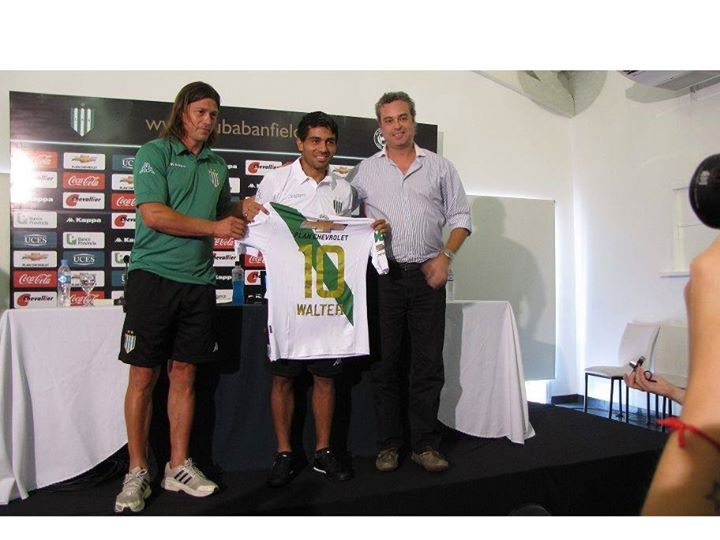
Almeyda (left) as Banfield manager in 2015

In April 2013, Almeyda became the head coach of Banfield in the Primera B Nacional. On May 16, 2014, Banfield secured promotion to the top division. Almeyda left the club on August 3, 2015.

=== Guadalajara ===
In September 2015, Mexican club Guadalajara appointed Almeyda as their new manager. He won his first four matches in charge, including the Clásico Nacional against Club América at the Estadio Azteca. Over the next 18 months, Almeyda guided Guadalajara to three titles: two Copa MX trophies and a Supercopa MX.

Guadalajara qualified for the Clausura 2017 play‑offs, where they defeated Atlas in the quarter‑finals and subsequently eliminated Deportivo Toluca to reach the final. There, they prevailed 4–3 against Tigres UANL, securing the club's twelfth league championship.

On April 25, 2018, Guadalajara triumphed against Toronto to win the CONCACAF Champions League. On June 11, Almeyda resigned from his post following disagreements with the club's management.

=== San Jose Earthquakes ===
On 8 October 2018, Almeyda was appointed as the new head coach of Major League Soccer club San Jose Earthquakes, starting with the 2019 season. He attained 44 points within the Western Conference, missing the playoff berth by one win.

The following campaign, Almeyda's side managed to reach the playoffs, facing Sporting Kansas City in the first round but losing following a 3–0 penalty shoot-out after a 3–3 tie.

On 18 April 2022, Almeyda and San Jose Earthquakes parted ways, two days after the team drew 2–2 with Nashville SC.

=== AEK Athens ===
On 20 May 2022, Almeyda signed a two-year contract with Super League Greece club AEK Athens. On 10 January 2023, the club extended his contract until 2028.

In his debut season, Almeyda led AEK to victory in both the Super League Greece and the Greek Cup, achieving their first double since 1978. The following year, AEK reached the group stage of the Europa League after a three-year absence, which included a memorable 3–2 away win at Brighton.

On 13 May 2025, AEK and Almeyda parted ways after six consecutive losses in the playoffs.

=== Sevilla ===
On 16 June 2025, Spanish club Sevilla announced Almeyda as their new head coach. On 5 October, he guided the team to a 4–1 league victory over defending champions Barcelona. It was Sevilla's first win against Barcelona since 2015. On 18 February 2026, the Spanish Football Federation imposed a seven‑match suspension on Almeyda following multiple disciplinary violations committed during the February 14 fixture against Alavés. Almeyda was relieved of his duties on 23 March.

=== Monterrey ===
In May 2026, Almeyda returned to Mexico to become Monterrey’s head coach ahead of the 2026–27 season. On 18 July, Almeyda won his debut match with the club against Santos Laguna in a 3–2 home victory at the Estadio BBVA.

== Style of play ==
A tenacious, dynamic and physically strong player in spite of his diminutive stature, Almeyda excelled in a midfield holding role due to his stamina, tactical awareness, reactions, anticipation and work rate, as well as his ability to press opponents and break down opposition plays which allowed him to protect his team's back-line. Although he earned a reputation in the media as a hard tackler, due to his "no-nonsense style of play," he was gifted with good feet and passing ability, which enabled him to start attacking plays after winning back possession; he also stood out for his leadership throughout his career. During his time in Italy, pundits likened him to his rival, Dutch holding midfielder Edgar Davids of Juventus, although Almeyda believed that Davids was more offensive-minded, while he preferred to focus on the defensive aspect of the game in order to support his more creative and offensive teammates. Due to his diminutive stature, tackling, and ability to cover a lot of ground during matches, Almeyda was given the nickname el tractorito ("the little tractor," in Spanish) in the media.

== Coaching style ==
Almeyda's approach is heavily influenced by Marcelo Bielsa, his former manager, particularly in the emphasis on high-intensity pressing, attacking football and man-to-man marking of the opposition. Almeyda also incorporates the "Bushido Code" (a Japanese samurai code of conduct) into his coaching philosophy, emphasizing virtues like righteousness, courage, benevolence, respect, honesty, duty, loyalty, honor, and self-control.

== Career statistics ==
=== Club ===
Appearances and goals by club, season and competition
Club	Season	League			Cup		Continental		Other		Total	
Club	Season	Division	Apps	Goals	Apps	Goals	Apps	Goals	Apps	Goals	Apps	Goals
River Plate	1991–92	Primera División	2	0	—		0	0	—		2	0
River Plate	1992–93	Primera División	2	0	—		1 (Note: Appearance(s) in Copa Libertadores)	0	—		3	0
River Plate	1993–94	Primera División	14	0	1	0	0	0	—		15	0
River Plate	1994–95	Primera División	25	1	—		8	1	—		33	2
River Plate	1995–96	Primera División	24	2	—		20	1	—		44	3
River Plate	1996–97	Primera División	1	0	—		—		—		0	0
River Plate	Total		68	3	1	0	29	2	—		98	5
Sevilla	1996–97	La Liga	28	0	2	0	—		—		30	0
Lazio	1997–98	Serie A	19	0	2	0	7 (Note: Appearance(s) in UEFA Cup)	0	—		28	0
Lazio	1998–99	Serie A	25	1	5	0	6 (Note: Appearance(s) in UEFA Cup Winners' Cup)	0	—		36	1
Lazio	1999–2000	Serie A	19	1	2	0	8 (Note: Appearance(s) in UEFA Champions League)	0	1 (Note: Appearance(s) in UEFA Super Cup)	0	30	1
Lazio	Total		63	2	9	0	21	0	1	0	94	2
Parma	2000–01	Serie A	16	0	3	0	4	0	—		23	0
Parma	2001–02	Serie A	18	0	4	0	5 (Note: Two appearances in UEFA Champions League, three appearances in UEFA Cup)	0	—		27	0
Parma	Total		34	0	7	0	9	0	—		50	0
Inter Milan	2002–03	Serie A	16	0	0	0	10	1	—		26	1
Inter Milan	2003–04	Serie A	11	0	3	0	7 (Note: Four appearances in UEFA Champions League, two appearances in UEFA Cup)	0	—		21	0
Inter Milan	Total		27	0	3	0	17	1	—		47	1
Brescia	2004–05	Serie A	5	0	0	0	—		—		5	0
Quilmes	2005–06	Primera División	10	0	0	0	5	0	—		15	0
Lyn	2007	Tippeligaen	2	0	2	3	—		—		4	3
Fénix	2008–09	Primera C Metropolitana	4	0	—		—		—		4	0
River Plate	2009–10	Primera División	32	0	0	0	—		—		32	0
River Plate	2010–11	Primera División	30	0	0	0	—		—		30	0
River Plate	Total		62	0	0	0	—		—		62	0
Career total			303	5	24	3	81	3	1	0	409	11

=== International ===
Appearances and goals by national team and year
National team	Year	Apps	Goals
Argentina	1996	6	0
Argentina	1997	6	0
Argentina	1998	11	0
Argentina	1999	0	0
Argentina	2000	3	1
Argentina	2001	5	0
Argentina	2002	4	0
Argentina	2003	5	0
Total		40	1

Score and result list Argentina's goal tally first, score column indicates score after Almeyda goal.

International goal scored by Matías Almeyda
No.	Date	Venue	Opponent	Score	Result	Competition
1	26 July 2000	Estádio do Morumbi, São Paulo, Brazil	Brazil	1–2	1–3	2002 World Cup qualification

== Managerial statistics ==
As of match played on 21 November 2026

Managerial record by team and tenure
Team	Nat	From	To	Record							
Team	Nat	From	To	G	W	D	L	GF	GA	GD	Win %
River Plate	(Argentina)	1 July 2011	27 November 2012	60	29	22	9	97	45	+52	48.33
Banfield	(Argentina)	21 April 2013	3 August 2015	98	44	27	27	148	102	+46	44.90
Guadalajara (Note: Includes matches from Liga MX, Copa MX, Supercopa MX and Copa Libertadores)	(Mexico)	15 September 2015	11 June 2018	139	56	44	39	167	143	+24	40.29
San Jose Earthquakes	(United States)	8 October 2018	18 April 2022	103	33	26	44	158	192	−34	32.04
AEK Athens	(Greece)	18 Μay 2022	13 May 2025	134	80	25	29	244	116	+128	59.70
Sevilla	(Spain)	16 June 2025	22 March 2026	32	10	7	15	43	52	−9	31.25
Monterrey	(Mexico)	1 June 2026	present	23	11	4	8	38	34	+4	47.83
Total				589	263	155	171	895	684	+211	44.65

== Honours ==
=== Player ===
River Plate

- Argentine Primera División: 1991 Apertura, 1993 Apertura, 1994 Apertura, 1996 Apertura
- Copa Libertadores: 1996

Lazio

- Serie A: 1999–2000
- Coppa Italia: 1997–98, 1999–2000
- Supercoppa Italiana: 1998
- UEFA Cup Winners' Cup: 1998–99
- UEFA Super Cup: 1999

Parma

- Coppa Italia: 2001–02

Argentina

- Summer Olympic Games Silver medal: 1996

Individual

- Guerin d'Oro (former Serie A Footballer of the Year): 1998–99

=== Manager ===
River Plate

- Primera Nacional: 2011–12

Banfield

- Primera Nacional: 2013–14

Guadalajara

- Liga MX: Clausura 2017
- Copa MX: Apertura 2015, Clausura 2017
- Supercopa MX: 2016
- CONCACAF Champions League: 2018

AEK Athens

- Super League Greece: 2022–23
- Greek Cup: 2022–23

Individual

- Primera Nacional Manager of the Year: 2011–12, 2013–14
- Liga MX Best XI Manager: Clausura 2017
- Liga MX Manager of the Season: 2016–17
- CONCACAF Men's Football Coach of the Year: 2018
- Super League Greece Manager of the Season: 2022–23
