= Davide Bagnacani =

Italian footballer (born 1980)

Personal information
- Date of birth: 8 January 1980 (age 46)
- Place of birth: Reggio Emilia, Italy
- Height: 1.88 m (6 ft 2 in)
- Position: Goalkeeper

Youth career
- 1997–1998: Reggiana

Senior career*
Years	Team	Apps	(Gls)
1999–2002	Piacenza	0	(0)
2002–2003	Roma	0	(0)
2002–2003	→ Castel di Sangro (loan)	21	(0)
2003–2005	Piacenza	1	(0)
2005–2007	Reggiana	12	(0)
Total		34	(0)

International career
1998	Italy U17	4	(0)
1998–1999	Italy U18	7	(0)
- * Club domestic league appearances and goals

Davide Bagnacani (born 8 January 1980) is an Italian former footballer, who played as a goalkeeper.

== Career ==
=== Early career & false accounting scandal ===
Born in Reggio Emilia, Bagnacani started his career at Reggiana. In 1999–2000 season, he left for Serie A side Piacenza, in the first season at Flavio Roma's backup along with Michele Nicoletti and Matteo Giovagnoli. On 29 June 2002, one day before the end of 2001–02 fiscal year, along with team-mate Stefano Di Fiordo were exchanged with Roma's Primavera youth team keeper Simone Paoletti and Alfredo Vitolo in co-ownership deal for €4.5Million, which later suspected to be an irregular deal to gain false profit by inflated the nominal price. That season Roma gained €55 million by exchanged their youth players with inflated price but almost all €55million were in terms of registration rights of other team's youth products. AS Roma was finally fined €60,000 by Criminal Court of Rome on 30 October 2007 for irregularity on youth player transfers.

=== Roma & Piacenza ===
Bagnacani was immediately loaned to Serie C2 side Castel di Sangro which he played as first choice. In June 2003, he was bought back by Piacenza along with Di Fiordo for undisclosed fees and Roma bought back Paoletti and Vitolo for just €1,000. He became Matteo Guardalben and Paolo Orlandoni's backup in 2003–04 season. He played the last match of the season on 12 June 2004 and backup by Marco Serena. The match ended in 4–4 draw with Genoa.

=== Reggiana ===
In 2005, he left for hometown club Reggiana at Serie C2, as Raffaele Nuzzo's backup. He was offered a new 1-year contract in July 2006. The club lost in the promotion playoffs in 2007, Bagnacani and Nuzzo were retired and replaced by Marco Ambrosio and Luca Tomasig.

=== International career ===
Bagnacani was played for Italy at youth levels. He played for Italy U18 team at 1999 UEFA European Under-18 Football Championship as first choice and lost to Portugal U18 team in the finals. (Now a U19 event)
