= Juan Carlos Ibáñez =

Argentine footballer (1969–2015)

Personal information
- Full name: Juan Carlos Ibáñez
- Date of birth: 20 March 1968
- Place of birth: Gral. San Martín, Argentina
- Date of death: 4 October 2015 (aged 47)
- Place of death: Gral. San Martín, Argentina
- Height: 1.72 m (5 ft 7 1/2 in)
- Position: Forward

Youth career
- Independiente GSM
- Independiente

Senior career*
Years	Team	Apps	(Gls)
1987–1993	Independiente	34+	(6+)
1989	→ Salamanca (loan)		
1989–1990	→ El Porvenir (loan)	21	(9)
1993	Deportivo Cali		
1993–1997	Universidad de Chile	85	(35)
1996	→ Sport Boys (loan)		
1998	Unión Española		
1999	Cobresal	15	(3)
2000–2001	Deportes Concepción	15	(1)
2002–2003	Deportes Melipilla		
- * Club domestic league appearances and goals

Juan Carlos Ibáñez (20 March 1969 – 4 October 2015) was an Argentine footballer who played for clubs in Argentina, Chile, Peru, Spain and Colombia.

== Death ==
Ibáñez was born in General San Martín.

Ibáñez stood out as a player of Universidad de Chile between 1993 and 1997 with a brief stint on loan to Peruvian club Sport Boys, and retired in 2003 after playing for Deportes Melipilla.

Nicknamed el Bombero, Ibáñez was assaulted on 3 October 2015 and died of his wounds in a General San Martín hospital the following day.

== Honours ==
Universidad de Chile

- Primera División de Chile (2): 1994, 1995
