= Stefano Lombardi =

Italian footballer

Personal information
- Full name: Stefano Lombardi
- Date of birth: 28 July 1976 (age 50)
- Place of birth: Pordenone, Italy
- Height: 1.80 m (5 ft 11 in)
- Position: Defender

Team information
- Current team: Modena F.C.
- Number: 28

Senior career*
Years	Team	Apps	(Gls)
1992–1993	Treviso	4	(0)
1993–1994	A.C. Milan	0	(0)
1994–1995	Treviso	30	(1)
1995–1996	Bologna	2	(0)
1996–1997	Treviso	22	(0)
1997–1998	Genoa	28	(1)
1998–1999	Lazio	4	(0)
1999–2000	Napoli	19	(0)
2000–2004	Internazionale	0	(0)
2001	→ Perugia (loan)	3	(0)
2001–2002	→ Genoa (loan)	19	(0)
2002–2004	→ Ancona (loan)	17	(0)
2004–2005	Catania	15	(1)
2005–2006	Arezzo	35	(0)
2007	Ascoli	10	(0)
2007–	Modena	4	(0)
- * Club domestic league appearances and goals as of 14:49, 7 March 2009 (UTC)

Stefano Lombardi (born 28 July 1976 in Pordenone) is an Italian footballer who played as a defender last for Modena F.C.

== Career ==
Lombardi made his Serie A debut against Piacenza Calcio, on 13 September 1998. He won the Cup Winners Cup in 1998–99. Since then, he has played 20 more games in Serie A.

He also played 135 Serie B games, 22 in Serie C1, and 34 in Serie D. He retired in 2008.
