= Jorge Cerino =

Argentine footballer

Personal information
- Full name: Jorge Roberto Cerino
- Date of birth: April 28, 1971 (age 55)
- Place of birth: San Nicolás, Buenos Aires, Argentina
- Height: 1.81 m (5 ft 11 in)
- Position: Forward

Youth career
- Belgrano San Nicolás
- Doce de Octubre
- 1987–1988: Newell's Old Boys

Senior career*
Years	Team	Apps	(Gls)
1989–1992	Newell's Old Boys	9	(1)
1992–1993	Atlético Tucumán	14	(2)
1993–1994	Coquimbo Unido	22	(3)
1994–1995	LDU Quito	12	(4)
1996–1997	Deportes La Serena		
1998–1999	Unión Española		
2000–2002	Santiago Morning	18	(3)
2002	Shangdu	–	(–)
2003	Cienciano	6	(0)
2003–2005	Les Verts de Sherbrooke	–	(–)
2005–2006	La Emilia	18	(4)
2006	Juventud Unida	13	(4)
2007	Deportivo Maipú	14	(1)
2007	Huracán Las Heras	–	(–)
2007	Gutiérrez	–	(–)
2008	Coquimbo Unido	22	(3)

Managerial career
- 2003–2005: Les Verts de Sherbrooke (youth)
- –2016: Coquimbo Unido (youth)
- 2015: Coquimbo Unido (interim)
- Belgrano San Nicolás
- * Club domestic league appearances and goals

Jorge Roberto Cerino (born April 28, 1971, in Buenos Aires, Argentina) is a former Argentine footballer who played for clubs of Argentina, Chile, Peru, Canada and Ecuador. He played as a winger.

== Teams (Player) ==
- (Argentina) Belgrano San Nicolás (youth)
- (Argentina) Doce de Octubre (youth)
- (Argentina) Newell's Old Boys 1987–1992
- (Argentina) Atlético Tucumán 1992–1993
- (Chile) Coquimbo Unido 1993–1994
- (Ecuador) LDU Quito 1994–1995
- (Chile) Deportes La Serena 1996–1997
- (Chile) Unión Española 1998–1999
- (Chile) Santiago Morning 2000–2002
- (China) Shangdu 2002
- (Peru) Cienciano 2003
- (Canada) Les Verts de Sherbrooke 2003–2005
- (Indonesia) 2005
- (Argentina) La Emilia 2005–2006
- (Argentina) Juventud Unida de Gualeguaychú 2006
- (Argentina) Deportivo Maipú 2007
- (Argentina) Huracán Las Heras 2007
- (Argentina) Gutiérrez
- (Chile) Coquimbo Unido 2008

== Teams (Coach) ==
- (Canada) Les Verts de Sherbrooke (youth) 2003–2005
- (Chile) Coquimbo Unido (youth) –2016
- (Chile) Coquimbo Unido (interim) 2015
- (Argentina) Belgrano San Nicolás
