= Gasperino Cinelli =

Italian footballer

Personal information
- Date of birth: January 3, 1982 (age 44)
- Place of birth: Latina, Italy
- Position(s): Winger; forward

Senior career*
Years	Team	Apps	(Gls)
-2001–02	S.S. Lazio	0	(0)
2000–01	Ternana Calcio→(loan)	13	(0)
2002–03	F.C. Aprilia Racing Club		
2003–04	A.S.D. Igea Virtus Barcellona	11	(2)
2003–05	Latina Calcio 1932	9	(1)
2004–05	U.S. Alessandria Calcio 1912		
2005–06	Derthona F.B.C. 1908		
2006–07	F.C. Rieti	6	(0)
2006–07	A.S.D. Albalonga		
2007–08	Pol. Monterotondo Lupa		
2007–08 2010–11	Latina Calcio 1932	16+	(0+)
2011–12	A.S.D. Anziolavinio		
2011–12	A.S.D. Nuova Circe		
2017–18	Pontinia Calcio 1994		
- * Club domestic league appearances and goals

Gasperino Cinelli (born 3 January 1982 in Italy) is an Italian retired footballer.

== Career ==
At the age of 17, Cinelli was named best player at the 1999 Torneo di Viareggio, the most prestigious youth tournament in Italy. At the time, he was considered to be one of the best prospects in Italy and was compared to former S.S. Lazio players Vincenzo D'Amico as well as Alen Bokšić, both forwards. However, he could not handle the pressure and was playing in the Italian amateur fifth division by 2005, at the age of 23.
