= Alejandro Bernal (Chilean footballer) =

Chilean footballer

Personal information
- Full name: Alejandro Antonio Bernal Gutiérrez
- Date of birth: 21 May 1969
- Place of birth: San Felipe, Chile
- Position: Midfielder

Youth career
- Unión San Felipe

Senior career*
Years	Team	Apps	(Gls)
1986–1990	Unión San Felipe		(15)
1990	Universidad de Chile	6	(0)
1991–1994	Unión Española	53	(9)
1995	Coquimbo Unido	15	(1)
1996	Unión San Felipe	23	(4)
1997	O'Higgins	26	(11)
1998	Deportes Linares		(5)
1999	Deportes Puerto Montt	29	(5)
2000–2001	Deportes Ovalle		(6)
2003–2004	Persik Kediri		(1)
Total			(57)
- * Club domestic league appearances and goals

Alejandro Antonio Bernal Gutiérrez (born 21 May 1969) is a Chilean former professional footballer who played as a midfielder for clubs in Chile and Indonesia.

== Career ==
A product of the Unión San Felipe youth system, Bernal made his debut in 1986, when the team was relegated to the Chilean Segunda División, alongside players such as Héctor Roco and Ricardo González, making seven appearances. He stayed with the team until the 1989 season, when they had returned to the Chilean Primera División and were again relegated to the second level.

In the Chilean Primera División, he also played for Universidad de Chile (1990), Unión Española (1991–94), Coquimbo Unido (1995) and Deportes Puerto Montt (1999).

In the second level of Chilean football, he also played for O'Higgins (1997), becoming the top goalscorer of the team in the season, Deportes Linares (1998) and Deportes Ovalle (2000–01).

Abroad, he played for Indonesian club Persik Kediri in 2003–04, where he coincided with his compatriots Juan Carlos Tapia and Claudio Villan. As a member of Persik Kediri, he won the league title in 2003.

== Honours ==
Persik Kediri

- Liga Indonesia Premier Division: 2003
