= 1995 Campeonato Nacional Primera División =

Campeonato Nacional Copa Banco del Estado
- Dates: 1 April – 3 December 1995
- Champions: Universidad de Chile (9th title)
- Relegated: Deportes La Serena; Everton
- 1996 Copa Libertadores: Universidad de Chile; Universidad Católica (Liguilla winners)
- 1995 Copa CONMEBOL: Cobreloa (Liguilla 1994 2nd place)
- Matches: 240
- Goals: 718 (2.99 per match)
- Top goalscorer: Gabriel Caballero (18); Aníbal González (18)
- Biggest home win: Colo-Colo 10–0 Regional Atacama (27 August)
- Highest attendance: 77,357 Universidad de Chile 2–0 Deportes Temuco (3 December)
- Total attendance: 2,008,094
- Average attendance: 8,367

The 1995 Campeonato Nacional, known as Campeonato Nacional Copa Banco del Estado 1995 for sponsorship purposes, was the 63rd season of top-flight football in Chile. Universidad de Chile won their ninth title following a 2–0 home win against Deportes Temuco on 3 December. Universidad Católica also qualified for the next Copa Libertadores as Liguilla winners.

== Final table ==
Pos	Team	Pld	W	D	L	GF	GA	GD	Pts	Qualification or relegation
1	Universidad de Chile	30	18	8	4	64	30	+34	62	Champions and qualified for the 1996 Copa Libertadores
2	Universidad Católica	30	17	9	4	50	22	+28	60	Qualified for the Liguilla Pre-Copa Libertadores
3	Colo-Colo	30	15	7	8	61	35	+26	52	Qualified for the Liguilla Pre-Copa Libertadores
4	Deportes Temuco	30	12	9	9	49	34	+15	45	Qualified for the Liguilla Pre-Copa Libertadores
5	Cobreloa	30	11	11	8	49	40	+9	44	Qualified for the Liguilla Pre-Copa Libertadores
6	O'Higgins	30	10	12	8	52	41	+11	42	
7	Coquimbo Unido	30	11	9	10	47	40	+7	42	
8	Deportes Antofagasta	30	12	6	12	44	49	−5	42	
9	Unión Española	30	11	7	12	45	47	−2	40	
10	Palestino	30	11	5	14	45	49	−4	38	
11	Provincial Osorno	30	9	11	10	34	49	−15	38	
12	Deportes Concepción	30	8	10	12	38	44	−6	34	
13	Regional Atacama	30	7	9	14	35	65	−30	30	Play promotion/relegation play-offs
14	Huachipato	30	6	11	13	40	55	−15	29	Play promotion/relegation play-offs
15	Deportes La Serena	30	7	8	15	35	60	−25	29	Relegated to Segunda División
16	Everton	30	7	4	19	30	58	−28	25	Relegated to Segunda División

Primera División Chilena
1995 champion
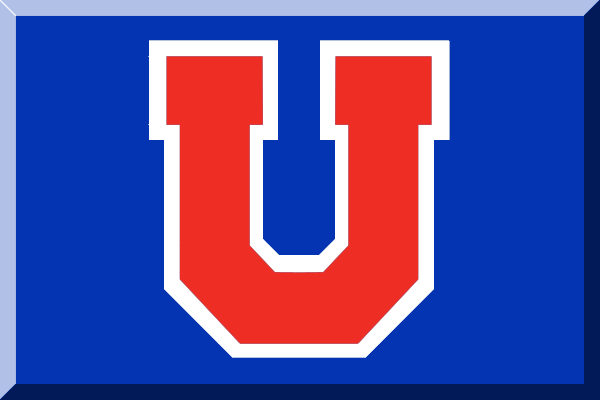
Universidad de Chile
9th title

== Results ==
Home \ Away	DAN	RAT	CLO	COL	DCO	COQ	EVE	HUA	DLS	OHI	POS	PAL	DTE	UCA	UCH	UES
Antofagasta		1–2	1–0	1–1	0–0	4–1	2–1	3–2	1–2	0–3	1–1	2–0	3–0	0–1	0–3	2–2
Atacama	0–1		0–0	0–5	1–1	0–0	0–2	4–2	0–1	1–1	0–0	1–0	1–1	2–1	2–2	2–1
Cobreloa	2–3	5–2		2–0	1–1	3–0	3–1	7–1	3–0	3–1	2–2	1–0	2–1	2–2	0–0	2–0
Colo-Colo	2–1	10–0	0–0		2–1	2–0	3–1	2–0	6–1	2–1	4–1	1–2	0–2	1–0	3–0	3–2
Concepción	2–3	1–0	1–1	3–0		2–0	0–0	3–1	0–1	3–5	2–2	3–1	1–0	1–1	3–2	0–0
Coquimbo	1–1	1–2	5–0	0–1	3–2		3–0	1–1	5–2	2–2	3–1	4–1	1–0	0–0	0–1	3–1
Everton	1–1	3–0	3–2	3–2	1–2	1–4		1–3	1–2	0–3	1–2	2–1	0–2	0–3	1–5	0–1
Huachipato	0–1	1–1	1–1	2–3	4–0	0–0	2–0		2–1	0–0	2–2	3–3	0–0	0–1	1–1	0–0
La Serena	2–3	4–3	1–0	0–0	0–0	2–4	1–3	1–2		2–2	3–1	0–2	2–2	1–1	1–5	0–0
O'Higgins	2–3	4–1	1–2	1–1	1–0	1–2	0–0	5–3	0–0		2–2	3–2	2–3	1–1	0–0	5–2
Osorno	1–0	3–1	2–0	2–1	2–0	0–0	1–1	0–2	1–0	0–0		0–0	0–0	2–1	0–1	1–0
Palestino	2–0	4–0	2–1	1–1	2–2	3–1	0–1	3–1	2–0	0–3	6–1		2–1	2–1	1–3	2–2
Temuco	2–1	4–1	1–1	0–0	2–0	1–1	3–1	3–3	4–1	0–1	4–1	5–1		1–2	1–0	4–1
U. Católica	5–1	2–1	1–1	2–1	1–0	3–1	3–0	3–0	1–1	0–0	5–1	2–0	2–1		0–0	1–0
U. Chile	3–1	2–2	2–2	2–0	4–2	1–1	2–0	3–1	2–0	4–2	5–2	3–0	2–0	1–3		4–1
U. Española	5–3	1–3	4–0	4–4	3–2	2–0	2–1	2–0	3–2	2–0	2–0	1–0	1–1	0–1	0–1	

Legend: Blue = home team win; Yellow = draw; Red = away team win.

== Top goalscorers ==
Pos	Name	Team	Goals
1	(Argentina) Gabriel Caballero	Deportes Antofagasta	18
	(Chile) Aníbal González	Palestino	18

== Liguilla Pre-Copa Libertadores ==
10 December 1995	Universidad Católica	2 – 1	Cobreloa	Estadio Nacional, Santiago
	Gorosito 26', 79'		83' Gamboa	Attendance: 30,050; Referee: R. Hormazábal

10 December 1995	Colo-Colo	0 – 0	Deportes Temuco	Estadio Nacional, Santiago
				Attendance: 30,050; Referee: S. Imperatore

13 December 1995	Universidad Católica	1 – 0	Deportes Temuco	Estadio Nacional, Santiago
	Madrid 87'			Attendance: 21,466; Referee: E. Gamboa

13 December 1995	Colo-Colo	3 – 0	Cobreloa	Estadio Nacional, Santiago
	Basay 68'; Rubio 73'; Vergara 81'			Attendance: 21,466; Referee: M. Sanchez

17 December 1995	Deportes Temuco	3 – 2	Cobreloa	Estadio Nacional, Santiago
	Arancibia 3'; De Luca 4'; Silva 88'		Riveros 31' (pen.); Latorre 76'	Attendance: 72,693; Referee: N. Mondría

17 December 1995	Universidad Católica	2 – 1	Colo-Colo	Estadio Nacional, Santiago
	Ceballos 78'; Lepe 83'		Etcheverry 67'	Attendance: 72,693; Referee: E. Marín

Universidad Católica also qualified for the 1996 Copa Libertadores

== Promotion/relegation play-offs ==
9 December 1995	Cobresal	1 – 0	Huachipato	Estadio El Cobre, El Salvador
	J. Neira 74' (pen.)			Attendance: 4,629; Referee: J. Toro

9 December 1995	Unión San Felipe	2 – 2	Regional Atacama	Estadio Municipal, San Felipe
	Martel 33'; Alonso 73'		73', 73' Malbrán	Attendance: 4,978; Referee: L. Osorio

16 December 1995	Huachipato	3 – 1	Cobresal	Estadio Las Higueras, Talcahuano
	Castillo 6'; Torres 9' (pen.); Fuentes 40'		3' Troncoso	Attendance: 8,109; Referee: I. Guerrero

16 December 1995	Regional Atacama	1 – 1	Unión San Felipe	Estadio Luis Valenzuela Hermosilla, Copiapo
	Correa 30'		6' Castro	Attendance: 4,537; Referee: S. Imperatore

Regional Atacama and Huachipato stayed in the Primera División Chilena

== See also ==
- 1995 Copa Chile
