= Federico Crovari =

Italian footballer

Personal information
- Date of birth: 20 April 1975 (age 51)
- Place of birth: Milan, Italy
- Height: 1.85 m (6 ft 1 in)
- Position: Midfielder

Youth career
- Monza

Senior career*
Years	Team	Apps	(Gls)
1994–1995	Monza	11	(0)
1995	Solbiatese (on loan)	8	(0)
1996–1999	Monza	71	(9)
1999	Lazio	0	(0)
1999–2000	Treviso	31	(2)
2000–2007	Vicenza	83	(3)
2007–2009	Padova	32	(0)
- * Club domestic league appearances and goals

Federico Crovari (born 20 April 1975) is an Italian former football midfielder. Crovari had played for a number of teams, mostly at Serie B level, before finally retiring in January 2009 when at Padova due to a recurring back injury.

Following his retirement, he rescinded his contract with Padova but stayed at the club, this time working as a scout. He was formally appointed as a scout by his club in July 2009.
