= Stefano Di Fiordo =

Italian footballer (born 1980)

Personal information
- Date of birth: 5 February 1980 (age 46)
- Place of birth: Civitavecchia, Italy
- Height: 1.82 m (6 ft 0 in)
- Position: Central defender

Youth career
- 1998–1999: Lazio

Senior career*
Years	Team	Apps	(Gls)
1999–2000	Piacenza	0	(0)
2000	→ Padova (loan)	4	(0)
2000–2002	Sora	60	(3)
2002–2003	Roma	0	(0)
2002–2003	→ Rimini (loan)	21	(0)
2003–2006	Rimini	46	(0)
2006–2008	Benevento	40	(0)
2008–2010	Cisco Roma	58	(0)
2010–2011	Campobasso	23	(0)
2011–2016	Astrea	47	(0)
- * Club domestic league appearances and goals

Stefano Di Fiordo (born 5 February 1980) is an Italian former footballer who played as a defender.

== Club career ==
=== Early career ===
Born in Civitavecchia, the Province of Rome, Di Fiordo started his career at S.S. Lazio. In the summer of 1999, he joined Piacenza along with Stefano Morrone and Flavio Roma as part of Simone Inzaghi's deal. He then left for Padova on loan, then for Sora in a co-ownership deal. (i.e. 50% rights) He won promotion playoffs to Serie C1 in 2001.

=== Roma & false accounting scandal ===
On 26 June 2002, he was bought back by Piacenza but on 29 June (one day before the end of 2001–02 fiscal year) left for Roma along with "team-mate" Davide Bagnacani, for Roma's Primavera youth team keeper Simone Paoletti and forward Alfredo Vitolo, in another co-ownership deal for a total cost €4.5M. He was immediately loaned to Serie C2 side Rimini. Roma also swapped youth players with other teams before the closure of the fiscal year and created a profit of €55 million by selling youth players, but almost all the "money" were in terms of youth players' registration rights from other teams. In June 2003, Di Fiordo and Bagnacani were bought back by Piacenza in undisclosed fees, and co-currently Roma bought back Paoletti and Vitolo for just €1,000. On 30 October 2007, Roma was fined €60,000 by Criminal Court of Rome for irregularity on youth player transfers.

=== Rimini ===
At Rimini Di Fiordo played 4 seasons. In the first season, he played 21 times in Serie C2 Group B runner-up and won promotion playoffs. After Di Fiordo was bought back by Piacenza in June 2003, he was signed by Rimini in co-ownership deal in July. Di Fiordo was between regular starter and substitute player in 2003–04 Serie C1 season but played more regularly for Rimini 2004–05 season, which Rimini won the champion in Group B. He just played 9 times in his first Serie B season.

=== Serie C2 ===
Di Fiordo then left for Benevento, played 40 times in 2 seasons both as starter and substitutes. After Benevento won Serie C2 champion, he left for Lega Pro Seconda Divisione (ex-Serie C2) side Cisco Roma which he became the regular starter.

== Honours ==
Rimini

- Serie C1: 2004–05

Benevento

- Serie C2: 2007–08
