= Myrmecophobia =

Specific phobia towards ants or hatred for them

Myrmecophonia
- Art depicting a single Ant
- Pronunciation: /ˌmɜːrmɪkoʊˈfoʊbiə/
- Specialty: Psychology
- Symptoms: Fear or hatred for ants

Myrmecophobia (/ˌmɜːrmɪkoʊˈfoʊbiə/) is the inexplicable fear of or hatred for ants. It is a type of specific phobia. This fear can manifest itself in several ways, such as a fear of ants contaminating a person's food supply, or fear of a home invasion by large numbers of ants. It is common for those who suffer from myrmecophobia to also have a wider fear of insects in general, as well as spiders (see Arachnophobia); such a condition is known as entomophobia. The term myrmecophobia comes from the Greek μύρμηξ, myrmex, meaning "ant" and φόβος, phóbos, "fear".

Myrmecophobia can cause people to experience anxiety, intrusive thoughts, sleeping problems, and avoidance. Other symptoms include sweating, increased heart rate, shortness of breaths, tumbling, panic, nausea, dry mouth, dizziness, headaches, and numbness. Myrmecophobia may be the result of earlier traumatic experiences that can be directly (or indirectly) linked to the object or situational fear, but this is not always the case; phobic responses can also be inherited as learned behaviours from the social context in which one was brought up.

In 2019, an Israeli study from Ariel University and Bar-Ilan University suggested that exposure to short clips from the Ant-Man movies could help to reduce an individual's phobia.

One way to reduce or overcome this phobia is by exposure therapy. In Psych Times studies, "exposure therapy may also be able to help reduce the symptoms of myrmecophobia". This form of therapy would work by slowly exposing the patient to ants. Depending on the severity of the patients' myrmecophobia, the exposure therapy treatment may start off by showing the patient pictures of ants, videos of ants, and then to ultimately have them be near ants in real life with little to no irrational anxiety. Another form of therapy that may help allay this fear is cognitive behavioral therapy (CBT), which can help by changing the mind's perspective and help overcome complications. In this case it can help with myrmecophobia by making the patient calm down and process what they are thinking and feeling, enabling them to figure out what the reasons are behind their reactions.

== See also ==
- Entomophobia
- Fear of bees
- Zoophobia
