= Gianluigi Buffon =

Italian footballer (born 1978)

Gianluigi Buffon OMRI CMS
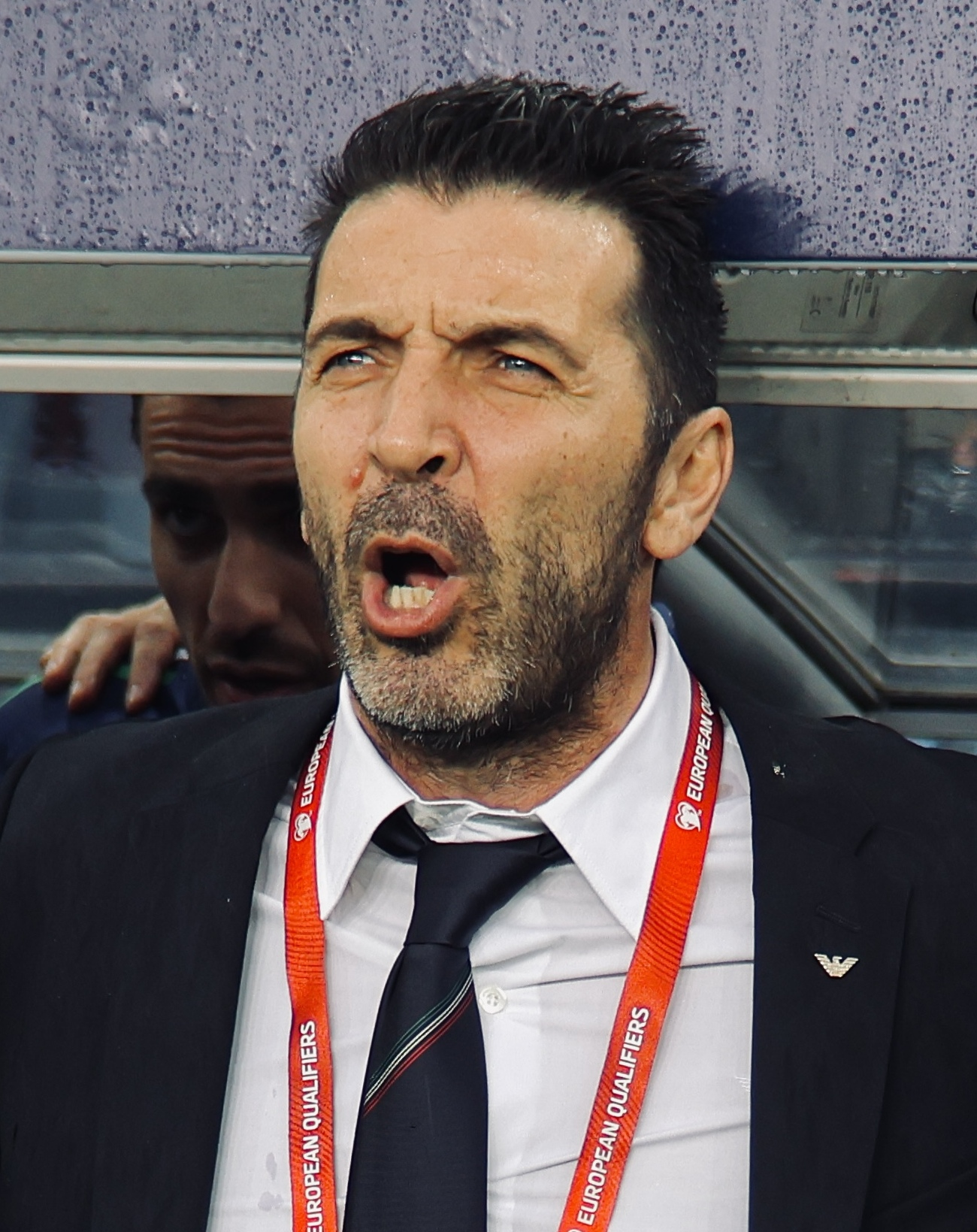
- Buffon in 2025

Personal information
- Full name: Gianluigi Buffon
- Date of birth: 28 January 1978 (age 48)
- Place of birth: Carrara, Italy
- Height: 1.92 m (6 ft 4 in)
- Position: Goalkeeper

Youth career
- 1991–1995: Parma

Senior career*
Years	Team	Apps	(Gls)
1995–2001	Parma	168	(0)
2001–2018	Juventus	509	(0)
2018–2019	Paris Saint-Germain	17	(0)
2019–2021	Juventus	17	(0)
2021–2023	Parma	43	(0)
Total		754	(0)

International career
1993–1994	Italy U16	3	(0)
1995	Italy U17	3	(0)
1994–1995	Italy U18	3	(0)
1995–1997	Italy U21	11	(0)
1997	Italy U23	4	(0)
1997–2018	Italy	176	(0)
Medal record
Men's football
Representing Italy
FIFA World Cup
Winner	2006
UEFA European Championship
Runner-up	2012
FIFA Confederations Cup
Third place	2013
UEFA European Under-21 Championship
Winner	1996
- * Club domestic league appearances and goals

Gianluigi "Gigi" Buffon (Italian pronunciation: [dʒanluˈiːdʒi ˈdʒiːdʒi bufˈfon, -fɔn]; born 28 January 1978) is an Italian former professional footballer who played as a goalkeeper. Widely regarded as one of the greatest goalkeepers of all time, he is one of the few recorded players to have made over 1,150 professional career appearances and holds the record for the most appearances in Serie A.

Buffon made his Serie A debut at Parma in 1995, helping Parma win the Coppa Italia, the UEFA Cup and the Supercoppa Italiana in 1999. After joining Juventus in 2001, for the world record fee for a goalkeeper of €52.9 million at the time, Buffon won Serie A titles in both his first two seasons at the club. In his first spell at Juventus spanning 17 years, he won a record nine Serie A titles, (Note: Not including the 2004–05 and 2005–06 Serie A titles, which were revoked following the Calciopoli scandal.) four Coppa Italias, and five Supercoppa Italianas. He was the first goalkeeper to win the Serie A Footballer of the Year award, and was named Serie A Goalkeeper of the Year a record twelve times. After reaching the 2015 and 2017 UEFA Champions League finals, Buffon was named to the Champions League Squad of the Season on both occasions, and won the inaugural The Best FIFA Goalkeeper award in the latter year. Buffon signed with French club Paris Saint-Germain at the age of 40 in 2018, where he was used in a rotational role with Alphonse Areola; he won the Trophée des Champions and Ligue 1 title in his only season with the team, before returning to Juventus the following year. During the 2019–20 season, Buffon served primarily as a back-up to Wojciech Szczęsny, but still managed to break Paolo Maldini's record of 647 appearances in Serie A, as he won a record tenth top flight title with the club. The following season he continued to serve as a back-up, but started in the Coppa Italia, winning his record sixth title. In June 2021, Buffon returned to his boyhood club Parma, who had been relegated to Serie B for that season, before announcing his retirement from football in 2023 at the age of 45.

With 176 international caps, Buffon is the most capped goalkeeper of all time, the most capped player in the history of the Italy national team, and the fourth-most capped European international player ever. Buffon also holds the record for most appearances for Italy as captain after he inherited the armband in 2010. Buffon was called up for a record of five FIFA World Cup tournaments (in 1998, 2002, 2006, 2010 and 2014) after making his debut in 1997; he was an unused substitute in the 1998 edition. He was the starting goalkeeper of the squad that won the 2006 tournament, being awarded the Golden Glove as the competition's best goalkeeper. He also represented Italy at four European Championships, at the 1996 Olympics, and at two FIFA Confederations Cups, winning a bronze medal in the 2013 edition of the tournament. Following his performances during the 2006 World Cup, where he kept a record five clean sheets, Buffon won the Yashin Award and was elected to the Team of the Tournament, an honour he also received from UEFA after reaching the quarter-finals of the 2008 and the final of the 2012 European Championship. Buffon retired from international football in 2017, after Italy failed to qualify for the 2018 FIFA World Cup; although he reversed this decision to play in the team's friendlies the following year, he officially confirmed his international retirement in May 2018.

Buffon was named by Pelé in the FIFA 100 list of the world's greatest living players in 2004. He is the only goalkeeper to win the UEFA Club Footballer of the Year award, which he achieved after reaching the 2003 Champions League final; he also won UEFA's award for best goalkeeper that year, and was additionally voted into the UEFA Team of the Year on five occasions. Buffon was the runner-up for the Ballon d'Or in 2006, and was elected part of the FIFPro World11 three times. He was the first ever goalkeeper to win the Golden Foot Award, and was also named the IFFHS World's Best Goalkeeper a record five times, alongside Iker Casillas and Manuel Neuer. He would go on to be named the best goalkeeper of the 21st century, of the past 25 years and of the decade by the same organisation.

== Early life ==
Buffon was born in Carrara, Tuscany. His mother, Maria Stella Masocco, was a discus thrower, while his father, Adriano, was a weightlifter of Friulian origin, from Latisana. Following their athletic retirement, they worked as P.E. school teachers. Buffon's two sisters, Veronica and Guendalina, played volleyball for the Italian national volleyball team, while his maternal uncle, Dante Masocco, was a basketball player in Serie A1, who also represented the national team. Buffon is also the second cousin twice removed of football goalkeeper Lorenzo Buffon.

In his youth, Buffon supported a number of clubs, including his hometown club Carrarese, Serie A heavyweight Juventus, and German side Borussia Mönchengladbach. Between the ages of eight and twelve, Buffon turned to supporting Inter Milan due to his admiration for manager Giovanni Trapattoni, along with Italian sides Pescara, Como, Avellino, and Campobasso, before finally settling with Genoa. He was a member of the ultras of Carrarese, specifically the "Commando Ultrà Indian Tips", and has the group's name printed on his goalkeeping gloves.

== Club career ==
=== Parma ===
==== 1991–1994: youth career and early professional career ====
"I've never seen a debut like his for the personality and quality he showed."

— Former goalkeeper and manager Dino Zoff on Buffon's debut.

Buffon played youth football as a midfielder with La Spezia–based amateur club U.S.D. Canaletto Sepor, before returning to Carrara to play for Perticata, then Bonascola. Buffon's first footballing idol was midfielder Blaž Slišković during the latter's first stint at Pescara. Despite offers from Bologna and Milan, (Note: Buffon's offer from the Milan youth team was later retracted as he had flat feet.) Buffon began his career with the Parma youth system in 1991, as the team's coach was struck by his physical qualities. At the youth academy, he played in several out-field positions, especially as a midfielder, before switching to goalkeeper. His idol Thomas N'Kono inspired this change of position due to his goalkeeping for Cameroon at the 1990 World Cup; when both of the Parma youth team's keepers suddenly suffered injuries, Buffon was called upon due to his interest, height and physical attributes. He quickly adapted to this role, and within two weeks he had been promoted to first keeper of the Parma youth team.

After a call-up to train with the first team during the summer of 1994, Buffon was promoted to the senior squad in 1995 and, at the age of 17 years and 295 days, made his Serie A debut for Parma under Nevio Scala on 19 November 1995. Buffon made seven more first team appearances that season and one appearance in the Coppa Italia, making his debut in the competition. At Parma, he trained under goalkeeping coach Villiam Vecchi.

==== 1996–2001: making the starting eleven, early success and recognition ====
In the 1996–97 Serie A season, Buffon was named as the starting goalkeeper for Parma. He conceded 17 goals in 27 appearances, and his performances gained attention in Italy. Parma were eliminated in the first round of the UEFA Cup, where Buffon made his European debut in a 2–0 defeat to Portuguese club Vitória de Guimarães on 24 September 1996. In the 1997–98 season, Parma finished in fifth place in Serie A and reached the Coppa Italia semi-finals. Buffon debuted in the UEFA Champions League that season. Buffon acquired his nickname "Superman" during the season when he stopped a penalty by Inter striker Ronaldo. He celebrated the save by revealing a Superman T-shirt underneath his jersey; the nickname was also a reference to Buffon's athleticism, agility and aerial ability.

In his fourth season with the club, Buffon won his first European trophy, the UEFA Cup. He also won the Coppa Italia with Parma that season. Buffon's performances that season earned him his first Serie A Goalkeeper of the Year Award and the Bravo Award. He placed fifth in the IFFHS World's Best Goalkeeper rankings, and received his first Ballon d'Or nomination. In the following season, he won his first Supercoppa Italiana title against Serie A champions Milan, and Parma finished fourth in Serie A once again, tied with Inter for the final remaining Champions League spot. Parma lost 3–1 to Inter in the European playoff match. Buffon helped lead Parma to another Coppa Italia final in the 2000–01 season, but were defeated by Fiorentina. Parma also finished the season in fourth place for the third consecutive year, which allowed them to go through to the Champions League play-off round. Buffon was voted Serie A Goalkeeper of the Year for the second time in his career, and also placed third in the IFFHS World's Best Goalkeeper award.

For the 2000–01 season, Buffon's initial decision to change from his traditional number 1 shirt to the number 88 shirt was criticised in the press due to its supposed neo-Nazi connotations, Buffon denied any knowledge of the association, stating that 88 represented "four balls", which are symbols of the character and attributes of a person. He stated that they were meant to signify his need for these attributes after his injury prior to Euro 2000, and that they also represented his "rebirth". He subsequently offered to change numbers, choosing the squad number 77 instead.

=== Juventus ===
==== 2001–2004: initial dominance ====
On 3 July 2001, Buffon was sold to Juventus for a world-record goalkeeper's transfer fee of 100 billion lire. This transfer fee made Buffon Juventus' most expensive purchase ever; the record broken in 2016 by the acquisition of Gonzalo Higuaín. He was given the number 1 shirt as the starting goalkeeper, replacing Edwin van der Sar. Although negotiations were ongoing with Barcelona, he chose Juventus because his father convinced him he would be likely to achieve his ambition of winning the Scudetto.

In his first season with Juventus, Buffon appeared in 45 official matches, helping his team to the Serie A title. Juventus was the team with the least goals conceded, with 22 goals in 34 Serie A matches. Juventus also finished as runners-up in the Coppa Italia to Parma; Buffon only made one appearance in the competition. Buffon was awarded his third Serie A Goalkeeper of the Year Award was nominated for the UEFA Team of the Year, losing to Rüştü Reçber.

At the beginning of the 2002–03 season, Juventus won the 2002 Supercoppa Italiana against Parma. Buffon had a dominant year, totalling 47 appearances in all competitions, of which 32 were in Serie A. He helped Juventus to the UEFA Champions League final, but lost in a penalty shoot-out to Milan. Buffon drew praise for making a reaction save from a close-range header by Filippo Inzaghi in the final during regulation time, which he later described as the most difficult save of his career in his 2008 autobiography. Juventus obtained their second consecutive Serie A, finishing with the least goals conceded with only 23 goals in 32 appearances. He also became the only goalkeeper ever to win the now defunct UEFA Most Valuable Player or UEFA Club Footballer of the Year award. He won the UEFA Best Goalkeeper award, and was elected to the UEFA Team of the Year and named the IFFHS World's Best Goalkeeper. Buffon was also nominated for the 2003 Ballon d'Or that season, finishing in ninth place.

In the 2003–04 season, Juventus were eliminated in the round of 16 of the Champions League and finished the Serie A season in third place, and also reached the Coppa Italia final. Buffon made his 100th appearance for Juventus that season on 30 September 2003 in a 2–1 away win over Olympiacos. He was named by Pelé as one of the top 125 greatest living footballers in March 2004. He was again elected as the Goalkeeper for the UEFA Team of the Year and as the IFFHS World's Best Goalkeeper. Buffon received his first FIFA World Player of the Year nomination in 2004, finishing in 21st place.

==== 2004–2006: Calciopoli and relegation ====
In August 2005, Buffon collided with Milan midfielder Kaká during the annual preseason Trofeo Luigi Berlusconi match, suffering a dislocated shoulder that required surgery. He returned to the Juventus starting line-up in November, but another injury sidelined him again. He returned to the starting line-up in January 2006, helping Juventus win their second consecutive Scudetto. Juventus were eliminated in the quarter-finals of the Champions League and in the quarter-finals of the Coppa Italia. Buffon was named IFFHS World's Best Goalkeeper for the third time and placed second in the 2006 Ballon d'Or (the first goalkeeper to do so since Dino Zoff in 1973). He placed eighth in the FIFA World Player of the Year Award behind Fabio Cannavaro and elected as the starting goalkeeper for the 2006 FIFPro XI and the UEFA Team of the Year, following his fifth consecutive nomination.

On 12 May 2006, several players, including Buffon, were accused of participating in illegal betting on Serie A matches, which initially put his place in Italy's 2006 World Cup squad at risk. In the 2006 World Cup he was Italy's starting goalkeeper and helped the country win their fourth title. Buffon was formally interrogated and admitted placing bets on sporting matches until players were forbidden from doing so in October 2005, but denied ever placing wagers on Italian football matches. He was cleared of all charges in December 2006. After the Calciopoli scandal, in which Juventus were relegated to Serie B, Buffon elected to remain with Juventus.

==== 2006–2011: Serie B champions, Serie A return and injuries ====
"Buffon is one of the greatest and best goalkeepers in football history. When Juventus were in Serie B, he showed himself to be faithful to the team, it was a great gesture."

— Former Bayern Munich coach Jupp Heynckes.

During the 2006–07 Serie B season, Buffon made 37 appearances. After Juventus won the Serie B title, earning promotion to Serie A for the 2007–08 season, Buffon signed a contract extension with Juventus until 2012. In 2007, Buffon was also elected as the goalkeeper for the 2007 FIFPro XI for the second consecutive year, and the IFFHS World's Best Goalkeeper for a fourth time. In the 2007–08 season, Buffon helped Juventus to a third-place finish, and Champions League qualification. He produced 94 saves in 34 league appearances and was named Serie A Goalkeeper of the Year for the seventh time in his career. During this season, Buffon began to suffer problems with his back, caused by a herniated disc, which kept him sidelined during the next few seasons. On 10 March 2008, Buffon renewed his contract until 2013.

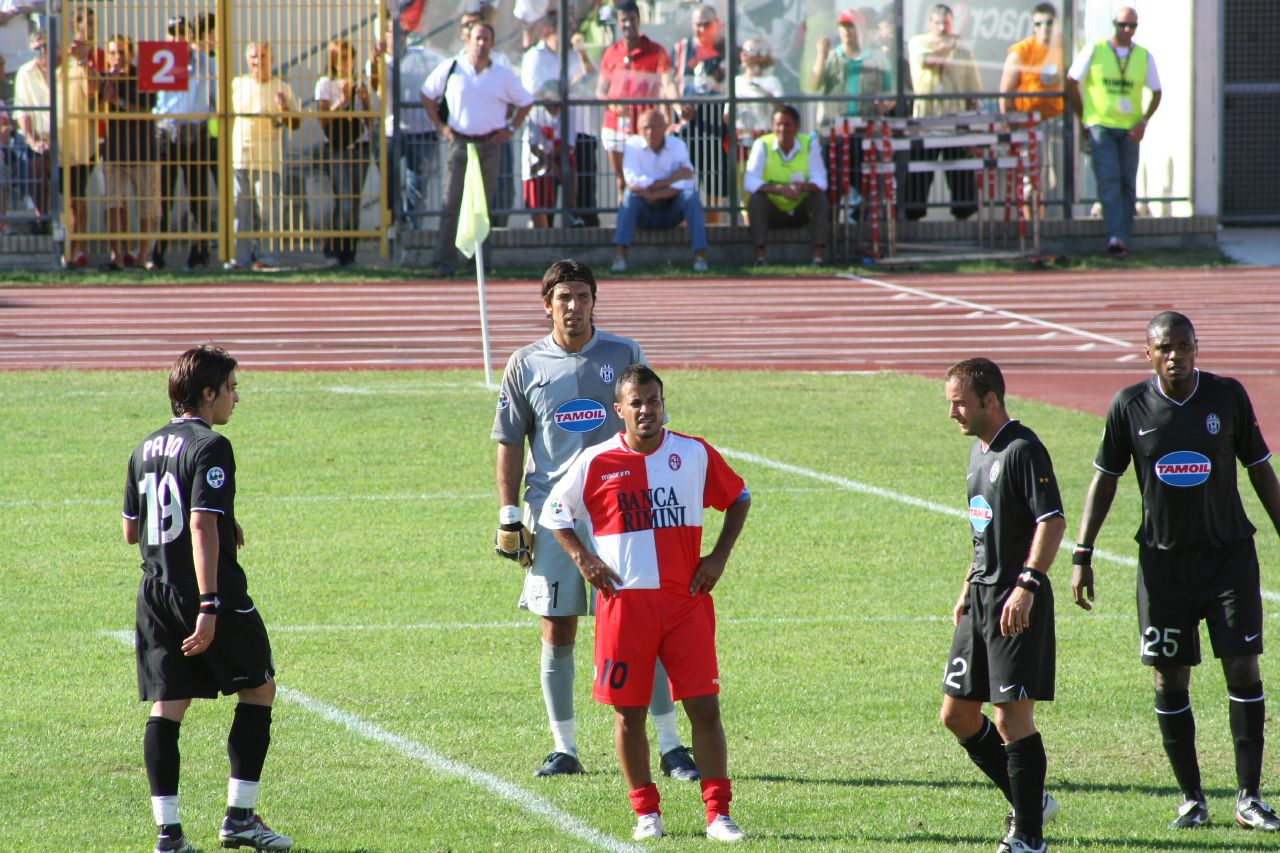
Buffon (rear) during his debut in Serie B against Rimini in 2006

In the 2008–09 season, Buffon was once again sidelined by several injuries. Buffon had recurring injuries during the 2009–10 season as well, and Juventus suffered a dip in form. In 2010, Buffon was voted goalkeeper of the decade by IFFHS. Buffon did not play for the first half of the 2010–11 season as he was recovering from surgery after an injury he endured to his sciatic nerve during the 2010 World Cup. Juventus were knocked out of the Europa League group stage, the Coppa Italia in the quarter-finals and finished the Serie A season in seventh place, failing to qualify for Europe, the first time since the 1990–91 season.

==== 2011–2014: new era of dominance in Serie A ====
During the 2011–12 season Buffon kept his 15th clean sheet of the season in Juventus's victory over rivals Inter in the Derby d'Italia. Juventus finished the season unbeaten, winning their first Scudetto since the Calciopoli scandal, and qualifying for the 2012–13 Champions League. Buffon obtained a league record of 21 clean sheets in Serie A, and only conceded a personal best of 16 goals from 35 appearances (an average of 0.46 goals per game). Buffon made 81 saves in Serie A that season and his 82 percent save percentage was the highest of any goalkeeper playing in one of Europe's five major leagues. Buffon was included in the 2011–12 Serie A Team of the Year for his performances.

On 25 February 2012, Juventus faced rivals Milan, with whom they were competing for the 2011–12 Serie A title. With Milan leading 1–0 at home, Sulley Muntari appeared to have doubled Milan's lead with a header from a cross by Urby Emanuelson; however the goal was not given by referee Paolo Tagliavento despite the ball crossing the line while being parried by Buffon. The match ended 1–1. Following the match, when asked about the incident, Buffon was criticised in the press for his response, stating: "The situation was so convoluted that I really didn't realise [if the ball had crossed the goal-line]. But even if I had realised that the ball was in the goal, I'm being honest in saying that I wouldn't have helped out the referee. I'm saying this in a very calm and impassive manner. But I'm confirming: on the pitch I didn't realise whether it was a goal or not. Juventus went on to win the league title that season.

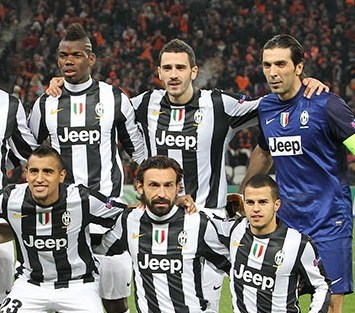
Buffon (top right) with Juventus in 2013

On 11 August 2012, Buffon lifted his first trophy as the new Juventus captain, following Alessandro Del Piero's departure as Juventus defeated Napoli 4–2 in the 2012 Supercoppa Italiana. Buffon suffered a minor injury and missed the first Serie A match of the 2012–13 season. He returned to the starting line-up on 2 September as team captain. He was nominated for the 2012 FIFA Ballon d'Or and the 2012 UEFA Team of the Year for his performances throughout the calendar year. He obtained his first Champions League clean sheet on 7 November against Nordsjælland and kept clean sheets against Chelsea and Shakhtar Donetsk, the latter of which was on Buffon's 100th club appearance in European competitions. Buffon kept a clean sheet in a Coppa Italia win against Cagliari on 12 December. Buffon was voted second in the IFFHS World's Best Goalkeeper award, behind Iker Casillas, and named goalkeeper of the century by the same organisation.

On 23 January 2013, Buffon signed a contract extension with Juventus, keeping him at the club until 2015. On 27 January 2013, Buffon was awarded the Serie A Goalkeeper of the Year award for the eighth time in his career. Juventus retained their Serie A title that season, and finished the league with the least goals conceded, with just 19 goals.

Buffon kept a clean sheet in the Supercoppa Italiana for the first time against Lazio in August 2013. On 24 November, Buffon made his 500th appearance in Serie A, keeping a clean sheet against Livorno. Buffon conceded a goal against Atalanta, setting a personal best of 745 minutes without goal concession in Serie A and equalling Luca Marchegiani's sixth-best unbeaten streak in Serie A history. Buffon was nominated for the 2013 FIFPro XI and the 2013 Ballon d'Or for his performances throughout the calendar year.

In 2013, Buffon was named the second best goalkeeper in the world by IFFHS, behind Manuel Neuer. He earned the Juventus player of the month award for December 2013. On 16 March 2014, Buffon saved the 20th penalty of his career in a 1–0 away win over Genoa, equalling Dino Zoff's 476 appearances for Juventus as the club's fifth all-time appearance holder. Buffon lifted the Serie A title for the third consecutive year, captaining the team to their 30th league title. Juventus finished the 2013–14 season with the least goals conceded in the league, and Buffon managed 89 saves and 18 clean sheets in 33 appearances, conceding 19 goals. Buffon was chosen for the 2013–14 Europa League Team of the Season for his performances throughout the tournament. On 1 July 2014, Buffon signed a contract extension that would keep him at the club until 2017.

==== 2014–15: second Champions League final and first Coppa Italia with Juventus ====
"He is a benchmark for me, and for every keeper of my generation. When I started playing, I had a dream – I dreamed of becoming like him, and every time I play against him it's a real pleasure."

— former captain and goalkeeper for both Real Madrid and Spain Iker Casillas on Buffon and his 500th appearance with Juventus.

In the summer of 2014, manager Antonio Conte left Juventus to take charge of the Italy national team, with former Milan manager Massimiliano Allegri called in as his replacement. On 29 October, Buffon made his 500th appearance for Juventus in a 1–0 away loss to Genoa. On 24 November, Buffon was nominated for the 2014 FIFPro World XI for a record tenth time. He is currently the only goalkeeper to have been nominated for the award every year since its inception in 2005. The same week, Buffon was also nominated for the UEFA Team of the Year. On 15 December, Buffon was named Serie A Goalkeeper of the Year for the ninth time in his career, and was elected to the 2014 Serie A Team of the Year. On 22 December, Juventus were defeated by Napoli in the 2014 Supercoppa Italiana 8–7 on penalties, following a 2–2 draw after extra time. Although Buffon made several saves during the match, and managed to stop three penalties in the shoot-out, he was unable to prevent his team from losing the title. Buffon placed fourth in the 2014 IFFHS World's Best Goalkeeper Award, behind Manuel Neuer, Thibaut Courtois and Keylor Navas; this was the 15th consecutive year in which he had been named as one of the world's top five goalkeepers.

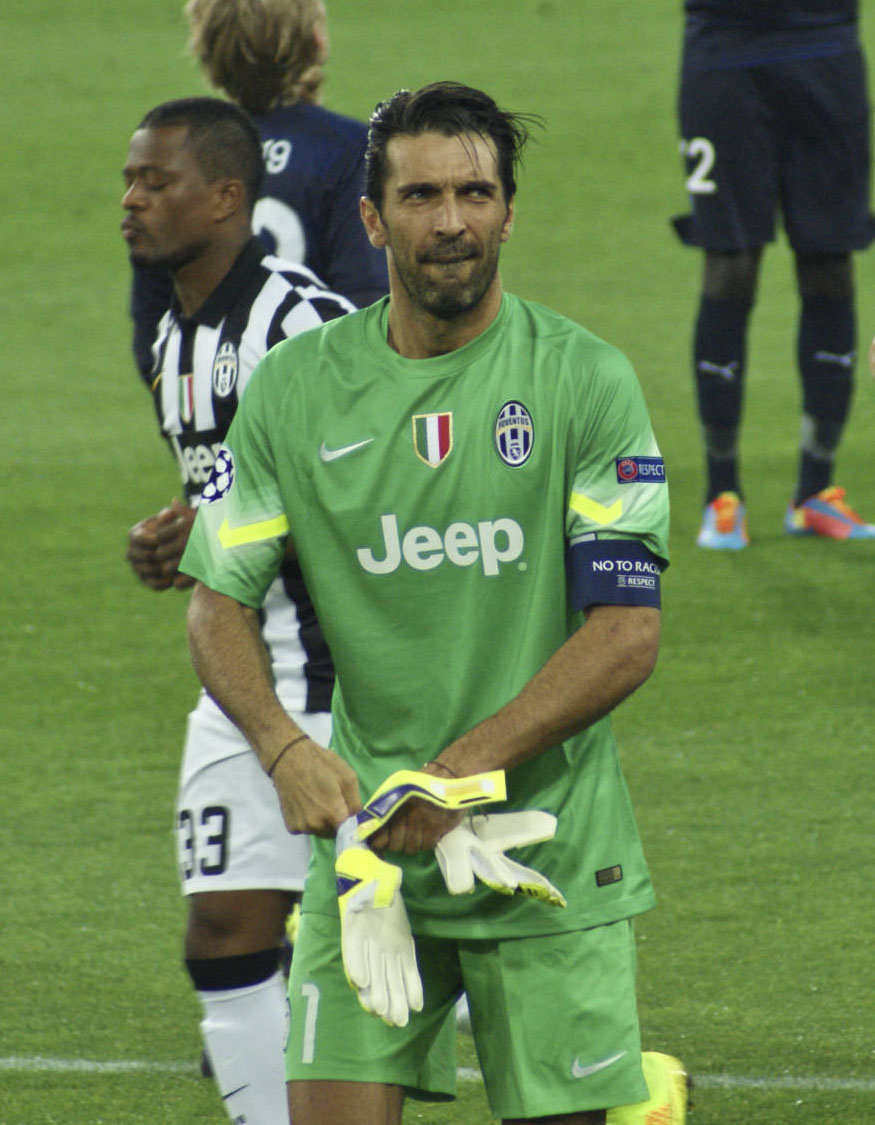
Buffon playing for Juventus in 2014

On 15 February 2015, Buffon surpassed Gaetano Scirea as the Juventus player with the second most minutes played in Serie A, behind only Giampiero Boniperti. On 2 March 2015, Buffon equalled Scirea as the Juventus player with the third most appearances in Serie A, behind only Boniperti and Del Piero. He later surpassed Scirea on 14 March, making his 378th Serie A appearance with Juventus in a 1–0 away win over Palermo. After keeping a clean sheet in the second leg of the Champions League quarter-final against Monaco on 22 April, Buffon overtook Dida as the goalkeeper with the fourth-highest number of clean sheets in Champions League history, with 36. On 26 April, Buffon made his 528th appearance for Juventus in all competitions, equalling Giuseppe Furino as the player with third-most appearances for the club; he overtook Furino on 29 April. On 2 May, Buffon kept a clean sheet in a 1–0 away win over Sampdoria, as Juventus won their fourth consecutive Serie A title. On 13 May, Buffon produced a man of the match performance as Juventus drew 1–1 with Real Madrid at the Santiago Bernabéu Stadium in the second leg of the UEFA Champions League semi-final, only being beaten by a Cristiano Ronaldo penalty; the result allowed Buffon to progress to his second career Champions League final with Juventus, 12 years after his last appearance. On 20 May, he won his first Coppa Italia title with Juventus, despite not featuring throughout the tournament that season. On 23 May, in his 900th career appearance, Buffon saved a Lorenzo Insigne penalty in a 3–1 home win over Napoli in Serie A. Buffon captained Juventus in the 2015 Champions League final as the club were defeated 3–1 by Barcelona at Berlin's Olympiastadion. Buffon made the most saves throughout the tournament (39), and kept the most clean sheets (6), along with Danijel Subašić, Manuel Neuer and Marc-André ter Stegen. He was named to the 2014–15 UEFA Champions League Team of the Season for his performances throughout the tournament.

On 15 July 2015, Buffon was named to the ten-man shortlist for the 2015 UEFA Best Player in Europe Award. His save on Dani Alves in the Champions League final was also nominated for the UEFA Save of the Season Award, finishing on a tied third-place in the voting.

==== 2015–16: fifth consecutive Scudetto and record Serie A unbeaten streak ====
On 8 August, Buffon kept a clean sheet as Juventus defeated Lazio 2–0 in the 2015 Supercoppa Italiana to win the title for a record seventh time. This was also Buffon's sixth title, and his fifth with Juventus. That year Buffon placed fourth in the 2015 UEFA Best Player in Europe Award and named the first Juventus Player of the Month of the 2015–16 season for September by fans. On 21 October 2015, Buffon overtook Del Piero's record for most minutes played with Juventus, made his 100th Champions League appearance on 3 November. The following week, Buffon was nominated for the 2015 UEFA Team of the Year, also making his 100th appearance for Juventus in European Club Competitions on 25 November. The following day, Buffon was included in the player shortlist for the 2015 FIFPro World XI. On 4 December 2015, Buffon made his 400th Serie A appearance with Juventus. For his performances throughout the previous season, Buffon was named Serie A Goalkeeper of the Year for the tenth time in his career on 14 December, and subsequently to the 2015 Serie A Team of the Year. Later that month, he was named one of the three finalists for the Globe Soccer Player of the Year Award. On 6 January 2016, he placed second in the 2015 IFFHS World's Best Goalkeeper Award, once again behind Manuel Neuer.

On 6 March 2016, in a league match against Atalanta, Buffon extended his unbeaten record by keeping another clean sheet in a 2–0 away win, also equalling Dino Zoff's and Sebastiano Rossi's league record of nine consecutive clean sheets in Serie A. His unbeaten streak of 836 minutes without conceding a goal was the third best unbeaten streak in Serie A history, behind only Zoff and Rossi, and was also the longest period a goalkeeper has gone without conceding a goal since three points for a win were introduced in Serie A during the 1994–95 season. He overtook Zoff in a 1–0 home victory over Sassuolo on 11 March, achieving a league record 10 consecutive clean sheets, and extended his unbeaten streak to 926 minutes without conceding a goal, only three minutes behind the all-time record holder, Rossi; the last time he had conceded a goal was when he was beaten by Antonio Cassano, in the 64th minute of a 2–1 away win over Sampdoria, on 10 January 2016. Buffon surpassed Rossi's record of 929 minutes by 45 minutes in a 4–1 away win over inter-city rivals Torino on 20 March, also surpassing Gianpiero Combi's Italian league record unbeaten streak of 934 minutes in the process; (Note: Gianpiero Combi's Italian league record unbeaten streak was set during the 1925–26 Prima Divisione season, prior to the establishment of the Serie A in the 1929–30 season.) he set the new all-time record at 974 consecutive minutes without conceding a goal. Andrea Belotti finally ended his goalless streak by beating him from the penalty spot in the 48th minute of the same match.

On 24 April, Buffon saved a late penalty from Nikola Kalinić to secure a 2–1 away victory over Fiorentina, his 13th penalty save in Serie A; following Napoli's defeat against Roma the following day, Juventus clinched their record fifth consecutive Serie A title with three games at hand. In addition to his decisive saves and record breaking unbeaten streak, Buffon was praised for his leadership, and his role in motivating the team following their defeat against Sassuolo on 28 October 2015, as Juventus subsequently went on a 25-match unbeaten streak to come back from 12th place after ten matches to win the title. For his key performances in helping Juventus capture the league title, Buffon was named the Juventus Player of the Month for April 2016. On 11 May, Buffon extended his contract until the end of the 2017–18 season. Throughout the 2015–16 season, Buffon had managed to equal his personal best of 21 clean sheets in a single league season, and was voted Juventus' Player of the Season.

On 18 July, Buffon was included in the ten-man shortlist for the 2016 UEFA Best Player in Europe Award, in which he finished sixth.

==== 2016–17: record sixth straight Scudetto and third Champions League Final ====
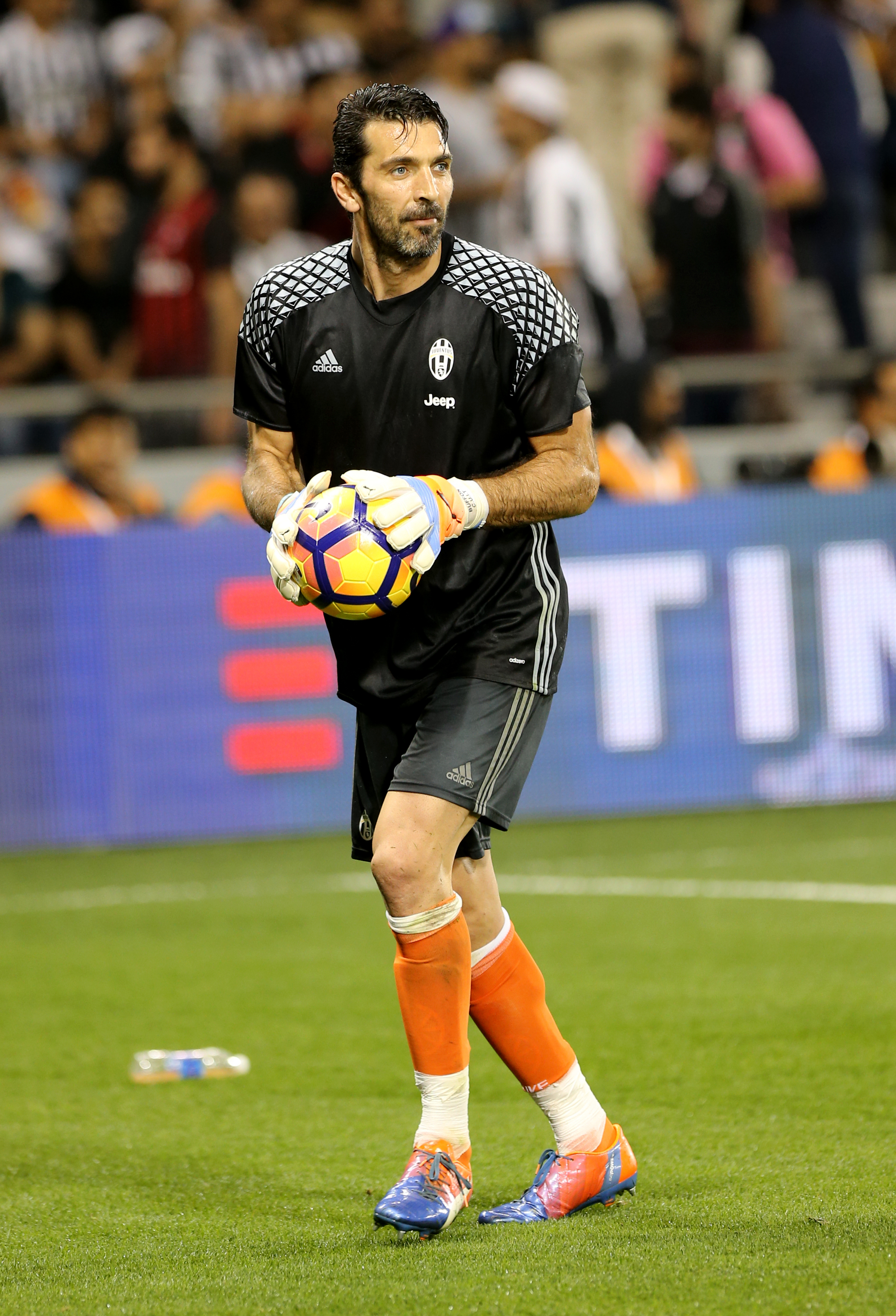
Buffon warming up before the 2016 Supercoppa Italiana

On 11 October 2016, Buffon became the first goalkeeper ever to win the Golden Foot Award. Following his performances throughout the year, Buffon was included in the 30-man shortlist for the 2016 Ballon d'Or; he placed ninth alongside Pepe in the final ranking. In Juventus' fourth Champions League group match of the season on 2 November, a 1–1 home draw against Lyon, Buffon made his 100th Champions League appearance (excluding appearances in qualifying rounds), becoming the 29th player to reach this landmark. On 4 November, he was included in the 23-player shortlist for The 2016 Best FIFA Men's Player Award. On 6 November, Buffon earned his 600th Serie A appearance in a 2–1 away win against Chievo, the fourth player to reach this milestone. His performances saw him earn the Juventus Player of the Month Award for October 2016. On 21 November, Buffon was nominated for the UEFA Team of the Year for the ninth time his career, making him goalkeeper with the most nominations ever, alongside Iker Casillas. On 1 December, Buffon was nominated for the 2016 FIFPro World XI, making him the only player, alongside Cristiano Ronaldo, to have been included in the shortlist every year since its inception in 2005. On 23 December, Buffon made his 600th competitive appearance for Juventus in the 2016 Supercoppa Italiana; following a 1–1 draw after extra time, Juventus lost 4–3 to Milan in a penalty shoot-out, although Buffon saved Gianluca Lapadula's initial spot kick. Buffon capped off the year by placing second in the 2016 IFFHS World's Best Goalkeeper Award, finishing behind Neuer once again.

On 5 January 2017, Buffon was named to the 2016 UEFA Team of the Year, becoming the oldest player ever to be named to the UEFA Team of the Year; this was also the fourth time he had been voted to the UEFA Team of the Year. On 9 January, it was announced Buffon had placed eighth in The 2016 Best FIFA Men's Player Award. On 30 January, Buffon was voted Serie A Goalkeeper of the Year for the 11th time, and named to the 2016 Serie A Team of the Year. On 17 February, Buffon made his 443rd Serie A appearance for Juventus in a 4–1 home win over Palermo, equalling Giampiero Boniperti as the club's all-time second highest appearance holder in the competition, behind only Del Piero. On 22 February, he made his 100th Champions League appearance for Juventus in the first leg of the club's round of 16 tie against Porto, keeping a clean sheet in the 2–0 away win. On 5 March, Buffon drew level with Totti as the joint third-highest appearance holder in Serie A after making his 612th appearance in the competition in a 1–1 away draw against Udinese. On 19 March, Buffon surpassed Boniperti as the all-time minute holder for a Juventus player in Serie A in the 66th minute of a 1–0 away win over Sampdoria. On 2 April, he equalled Javier Zanetti as the joint-second highest appearance holder of all time in Serie A, with his 615th Serie A appearance in a 1–1 away draw against Napoli. On 3 May, Buffon made his 100th appearance for Juventus in the UEFA Champions League (excluding appearances in the qualifying rounds) in a 2–0 away win against Monaco, in the first leg of the semi-finals of the competition; Buffon became only the second Italian player after Paolo Maldini to make 100 Champions League appearances for a single club, and marked the occasion with a clean sheet, his 47th overall in the competition, making him the goalkeeper with the third-highest number of Champions League clean sheets, alongside Čech, and behind only Casillas (57) and Van der Sar (50). This was the first time Juventus had managed to keep six consecutive clean sheets in a single edition of the tournament, the joint third-best number of consecutive clean sheets in a single Champions League season. On 9 May, Buffon made his 150th UEFA club appearance in a 2–1 home win over Monaco in the second leg of the Champions League semi-final, to reach the final, making him the player with the ninth-most appearances in UEFA club matches, alongside Jamie Carragher. Kylian Mbappé's second-half goal ended Buffon's goalless streak, which saw him set a new personal best of 600 minutes without conceding a goal in the Champions League, and put him fifth on the all-time table, while Juventus' overall unbeaten run of 690 minutes was the second-longest in the history of the competition.

On 17 May 2017, Juventus won their 12th Coppa Italia title in a 2–0 win over Lazio, becoming the first team to win three consecutive cups. Buffon did not feature, as his usual back-up Neto was the club's starting goalkeeper in the competition. Four days later on 21 May, following a 3–0 win over Crotone, Juventus secured their sixth consecutive Serie A title, establishing an all-time record of successive triumphs in the competition; with his eighth Serie A title, Buffon equalled Virginio Rosetta, Giovanni Ferrari, and Giuseppe Furino as the player with the most Italian league title victories. On 3 June 2017, Juventus entered a second Champions League final in three years, and the third final for Buffon, but were defeated 4–1 by defending champions Real Madrid. With his third Champions League final defeat, Buffon became the player with the most Champions League final appearances without a Champions League medal, alongside former Juventus teammates Paolo Montero and Alessio Tacchinardi. He was named in the UEFA Champions League squad of the season for the second time, and the tournament's best goalkeeper.

==== 2017–2018: final season of first spell with Juventus and seventh consecutive Scudetto ====
On 12 June 2017, Buffon announced that the 2017–18 season would likely be his last with the club. Buffon won the Goalkeeper of the 2016–17 UEFA Champions League season award, and placed third for the 2017 UEFA Best Player of the Year Award, behind Lionel Messi and Cristiano Ronaldo. On 19 August, Buffon made history by saving the first Serie A penalty awarded via VAR in a 3–0 home win over Cagliari in the club's opening league match of the season. On 23 October, Buffon won the inaugural 2017 Best FIFA Goalkeeper award, and was named to the FIFPro World XI for the third time in his career; he was also nominated for the 2017 Best FIFA Men's Player Award, finishing in fourth place in the voting. On 27 November, Buffon won the Serie A Footballer of the Year award, the first time a goalkeeper won the award, along with the Serie A Goalkeeper of the Year award for the twelfth time, while being named to the Serie A Team of the Year for the fifth time in his career. On 3 December, he equalled Casillas by winning the IFFHS World's Best Goalkeeper Award for a record fifth time, and on 7 December, he placed fourth in the 2017 Ballon d'Or. Following Juventus' 1–0 away victory against fellow title contenders Napoli on 1 December, Buffon was ruled out of Juventus' final Champions League group match against Olympiacos four days later, after picking up a calf strain in the previous match, an injury which kept him sidelined for almost two months.

On 11 January 2018, Buffon was named to the 2017 UEFA Team of the Year for the fifth time. Buffon returned to action on 30 January 2018, two days after his 40th birthday, keeping a clean sheet and saving a penalty from Alejandro Gómez to secure a 1–0 away win over Atalanta in the first leg of the Coppa Italia semi-finals; this was his first Coppa Italia appearance in over five years, while his penalty save was the 30th of his career, excluding those made in shoot-outs, and his first ever in regulation time in the competition. He made his 500th league appearance with Juventus — including both Serie A and Serie B matches — on 9 February, in a 2–0 away win over Fiorentina.

After Juventus lost 3–0 to Real Madrid at home in the first leg of the Champions League quarter-final on 3 April, Buffon helped Juventus keep a 3–0 away lead in the second leg on 11 April, until the 93rd minute when he was sent off for dissent after a confrontation with referee Michael Oliver who awarded a stoppage time penalty to Real Madrid; Wojciech Szczęsny was forced to be substituted in, with the resulting penalty kick converted by Cristiano Ronaldo for a final 4–3 aggregate loss, eliminating Juventus. On 11 May, Buffon was charged by UEFA over post-match comments made about referee Oliver, saying in part, "...Clearly you cannot have a heart in your chest, but a bag of rubbish...". Buffon later apologized for his comments. On 5 June, he received a three-match ban for UEFA competition matches.

On 9 May, Buffon kept a clean sheet, his 300th clean sheet with Juventus, and his 383rd at club level, in a 4–0 win over Milan in the 2018 Coppa Italia final; this was Juventus' fourth consecutive Coppa Italia title. On 13 May, Buffon won his record seventh straight Scudetto, following a 0–0 draw with Roma in Juventus' penultimate match of the season while an unused substitute; with this league victory, he became the first player ever to win nine Serie A titles. On 17 May, with one league match remaining, Buffon announced in a press conference that he would leave Juventus at the end of the season. On 19 May, after 17 seasons with the club, Buffon played his 656th and final match with Juventus, the last match of the season at home against Hellas Verona. He started in goal, and was later substituted in the 64th minute by debutant Carlo Pinsoglio as he received a standing ovation with the score 2–0 in favour of Juventus; the match later ended in a 2–1 victory. On 30 June, the final day of his Juventus contract, Buffon bid the club farewell with a post on Twitter:

"Seventeen years in black and white [officially] end today. Seventeen years of friends, team-mates, tears, victories, [defeats,] trophies, words, anger, disappointments, happiness and many, many emotions. I will never forget anything. I will always carry everything with me."

— Buffon on his last official day of this spell as a Juventus player in 2018

=== Paris Saint-Germain ===
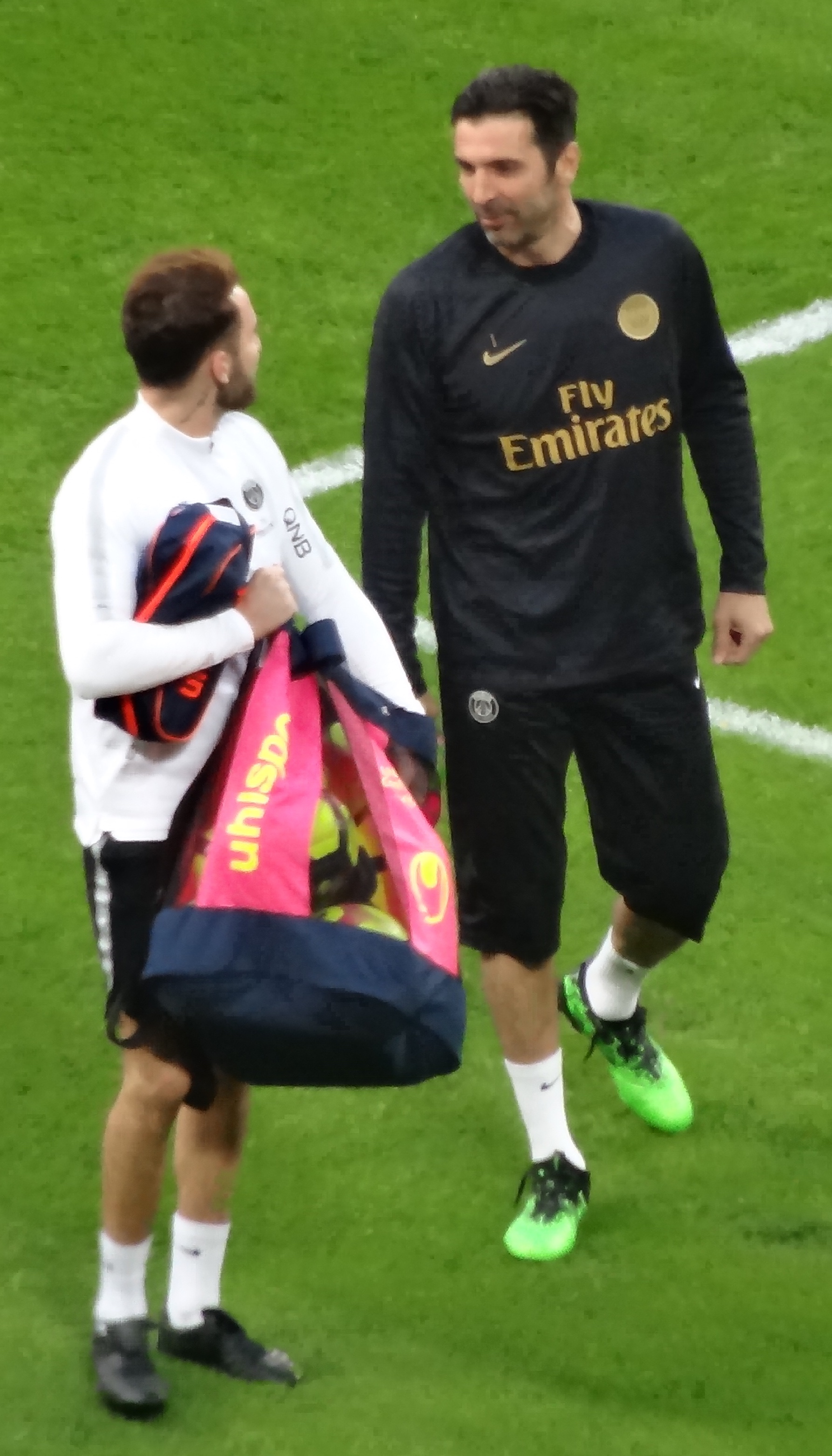
Buffon (right) warming up with Paris Saint-Germain in 2019

On 6 July 2018, Buffon signed a one-year contract, with the option for a second year, with Paris Saint-Germain. He made his competitive debut for PSG on 4 August, keeping a clean sheet in a 4–0 win against Monaco in the 2018 Trophée des Champions. Buffon made his Ligue 1 debut on 12 August, keeping a clean sheet in a 3–0 home win over Caen. He was used in a rotational role with Alphonse Areola during the 2018–19 season by manager Thomas Tuchel. After serving a three-match ban in UEFA club competitions, Buffon started for PSG in a 1–1 away draw against Napoli on 6 November, and was beaten by an Insigne penalty; at the age of 40 years and 282 days, he became the second-oldest player ever to make their Champions League debut for a club after Mark Schwarzer, who made his debut in the competition with Chelsea in a 1–0 home victory over Steaua București on 11 December 2013, aged 41 years and 65 days. On 18 December, following an injury to Areola, Buffon played the second half of an eventual 2–1 away win over Orléans in the round of 16 of the Coupe de la Ligue. PSG were eliminated from the competition in the following round after a surprise 2–1 home defeat to Guingamp on 9 January 2019, during which Buffon remained on the bench.

On 12 February, Buffon kept his 50th Champions League clean sheet in a 2–0 away win over Manchester United, becoming only the third goalkeeper to reach this milestone after Iker Casillas (57) and Edwin van der Sar (51). He also made his 121st Champions League appearance – excluding qualifying rounds – during the same match, which made him the player with the tenth-most appearances of all time in the competition. In the return leg in Paris on 6 March, Buffon came under criticism in the media for committing an error with the score tied 1–1, after he spilled Marcus Rashford's long-range shot, thus allowing Romelu Lukaku to score from the rebound and send United into the lead; following an injury-time goal from a penalty by Rashford, Manchester United completed a comeback to win the match 3–1, advancing to the Champions League quarter-finals on away goals. PSG finished the season as Ligue 1 champions, which saw Buffon win his tenth league title of his career, the most of any Italian player. PSG later lost 6–5 on penalties to Rennes in the 2019 Coupe de France final, following a 2–2 draw after extra time, although Buffon did not appear during the final.

On 5 June, it was confirmed that he was leaving the club after one season.

=== Return to Juventus ===
==== 2019–2021: record-breaking appearances ====
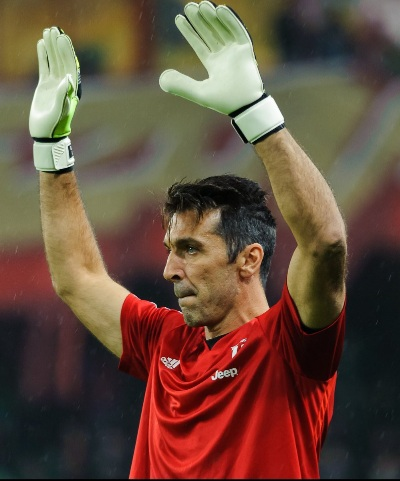
Buffon with Juventus in 2019

On 4 July 2019, after a season away from Juventus, Buffon signed a one-year contract with the club. Upon arrival, he was offered the number 1 shirt by Wojciech Szczęsny and the captaincy by Giorgio Chiellini, but he turned them down, saying "I didn't come back to take something from someone or take it back...I just want to do my bit for the team". Instead, he chose to wear number 77; the same number he had worn during his final season at Parma, before joining Juventus in 2001. He made his first appearance since his return to the club on 21 September, in a 2–1 home win over Verona in Serie A; this was his 902nd career club appearance, which equalled Paolo Maldini's record as the Italian player with the most career club appearances. On 28 September, he overtook Maldini with his 903rd appearance in a 2–0 home win over SPAL in Serie A.

On 30 October 2019, Buffon made his 513th league appearance for Juventus (including Serie B matches) in a 2–1 home win over Genoa in Serie A, equalling Del Piero as the player with the most league appearances for the club. On 11 December, he kept his 51st Champions League clean sheet (excluding those in the qualifying rounds) in a 2–0 away win over Bayer Leverkusen in Juventus' final group match of the campaign, equalling Van der Sar as the goalkeeper with the second-most clean sheets ever in the competition, behind only Iker Casillas. On 15 December, he made his 700th Italian league appearance in a 3–1 home win over Udinese; during the same match, he also made his 478th Serie A appearance for Juventus, which saw him equal Del Piero as the player with the most appearances in the competition for the club. On 18 December, in a 2–1 away win over Sampdoria, Buffon made his 479th Serie A appearance for Juventus, surpassing Del Piero's appearance record for the club in the Italian top flight, as well as making his 647th overall Serie A appearance, tying Maldini as the player with the most appearances in the competition.

On 13 February 2020, Buffon made nine saves in a 1–1 away draw against Milan in the first leg of the Coppa Italia semi-finals. He started in the final against Napoli on 17 June, keeping a clean sheet and making a series of injury-time saves to keep the score tied at 0–0; however, Juventus suffered a 4–2 defeat in the resulting penalty shoot-out, with Buffon unable to save any spot kicks. On 29 June, Buffon signed a new contract with Juventus, extending until June 2021. On 4 July, he made his 648th appearance in Serie A in a 4–1 home win over rivals Torino, overtaking Maldini as the most capped player of all time in the competition, also becoming the most capped player in Europe's top five leagues with 665 appearances, including his 17 Ligue 1 appearances for Paris Saint-Germain during the 2018–19 season.

On 17 October, Buffon made his first appearance of the 2020–21 season, starting in a 1–1 away draw against Crotone. On 8 December, Buffon kept a clean sheet by saving seven shots, all of them taken by Messi, in a 3–0 away win over Barcelona in Juventus' final Champions League group match of the campaign. Buffon became the first goalkeeper to ever record a Champions League clean sheet in four different decades. Messi's seven shots on target were also the most recorded without scoring in the Champions League since the 2002–03 edition. On 11 May 2021, Buffon announced that he would leave Juventus at the end of the season. The following day, Buffon saved Domenico Berardi's penalty in a 3–1 away victory against Sassuolo, becoming the oldest Serie A goalkeeper to do so at the age of 43 years, 103 days. On 19 May, he started in Juventus's 2–1 victory over Atalanta in the 2021 Coppa Italia final, his final and 685th appearance for the club; after the match, he was given the honour of lifting the title, the sixth of his career, equalling Roberto Mancini as the player with the most title victories.

=== Return to Parma and retirement ===
On 17 June 2021, after days of speculation following his departure from Juventus, newly relegated Parma announced the return of Buffon through a short video posted on the club's official Twitter account. Upon winning the Coppa Italia in his last season at Juventus, many expected that it was going to be the end of his career. Instead, he announced that he was going to join his boyhood club; this marked 20 years since he left Parma for Juventus in 2001. On 20 August 2021, Buffon made his first appearance, conceding a late equaliser in a 2–2 away draw against Frosinone.

On 5 February 2022, following a 0–0 away draw against Benevento in Serie B, Buffon became the first goalkeeper ever in men's association football to keep 500 clean sheets (322 with Juventus, 92 with Parma, 9 with PSG and 77 with Italy). On 28 February, Parma announced Buffon's contract extension until 2024, which would have kept him playing until the age of 46.

On 2 August 2023, at the age of 45 and after a 28-year playing career, Buffon announced his retirement from professional football. His final career appearance was on 30 May of that year, in the first leg of the semi-finals of the 2022–23 Serie B promotion play-offs; Parma lost out to 3–2 to eventual winners Cagliari after leading 2–0 at half-time, with Buffon going off injured at the break, which ruled him out of the second leg.

== International career ==
=== Youth career, early call-ups and Euro 2000 qualification ===
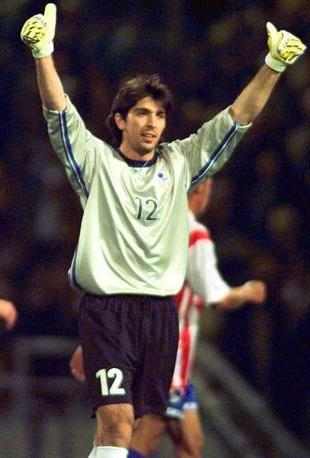
Buffon with the Italy national team in 1998

Buffon represented Italy at all youth levels, from the under-16 side to the under-23 side, as well as the Olympic side in 1996. With the under-16 side, he reached the final of the 1993 UEFA European Under-16 Championship, saving two penalties and even scoring one himself in the quarter-final shootout victory over Spain, and subsequently saving three penalties – but also missing one himself – in the semi-final shootout victory over Czechoslovakia. With the Italy under-17 side he took part at the 1993 FIFA U-17 World Championship in Japan. In 1995, he reached the final of the UEFA European under-19 Championship with the Italian under-19 side. He was a member of Italy's 1996 UEFA European Under-21 Championship-winning squad. Buffon was a member of the Italy squad that won the gold medal for football at the 1997 Mediterranean Games in Bari, on home soil. Buffon currently holds the record for the most clean sheets with the Italy national side.

Buffon was awarded his first cap for the senior Italy national team under Cesare Maldini on 29 October 1997, aged 19 years, 274 days, as an injury replacement for Gianluca Pagliuca during the first leg of the 1998 World Cup qualification play-off against Russia, in Moscow; with this cap, Buffon became the youngest goalkeeper to feature for Italy post-World War II. This record was beaten by Gianluigi Donnarumma on 1 September 2016. Buffon came on in the 31st minute and made notable saves under snowy conditions in a 1–1 draw, including an important stop from a Dmitri Alenichev shot, only being beaten by a Fabio Cannavaro own goal. The result helped Italy to qualify for the upcoming World Cup 2–1 on aggregate. He was a member of the squad for the 1998 World Cup finals, initially as the third choice goalkeeper; after an injury to starting goalkeeper Angelo Peruzzi, Buffon was promoted to second-choice goalkeeper behind Pagliuca, with Francesco Toldo being called up as third-choice, but Buffon did not play a single game in the tournament. Italy were eliminated in the quarter-finals on penalties to hosts and eventual 1998 World Cup champions France.

Buffon became the first choice goalkeeper during the Euro 2000 qualifying campaign and was due to start in goal during the competition under manager and former Italy goalkeeping legend Dino Zoff, but he broke his hand while attempting to stop John Carew's goal in a 1–0 defeat against Norway in a friendly match days before the start of the tournament. His starting place was taken by backup goalkeeper Francesco Toldo. Italy reached the final of the tournament, losing once again to France.

=== World Cup and European Championship debut ===
Francesco Toldo's impressive performances at Euro 2000 meant that he retained his place in the first team for the beginning of Italy's 2002 World Cup qualifying campaign. In spite of heavy competition from Toldo, Buffon regained the starting goalkeeping spot for the fourth match of the qualification series, away to Romania, and was the starting goalkeeper for the remaining four matches under Giovanni Trapattoni as Italy qualified with an unbeaten record.

Buffon played every minute of Italy's 2002 World Cup campaign, keeping a clean sheet in the opening match against Ecuador, and saving a controversial penalty against co-hosts South Korea in the round of 16, which was not enough to stop the under-performing side from being eliminated by a golden goal in extra time. He also featured in every match at Euro 2004, keeping a clean sheet in his nation's opening 0–0 draw against Denmark, although Italy, despite not losing a match, once again underperformed, and were eliminated in the first round on direct encounters following a three-way, five-point tie with Sweden and Denmark.

=== 2006 World Cup champion ===
"Gigi proved once again he's the best goalkeeper in the world."

— Ukraine striker Andriy Shevchenko on Buffon's performance following Italy's 3–0 victory over his side in the 2006 World Cup quarter-finals.

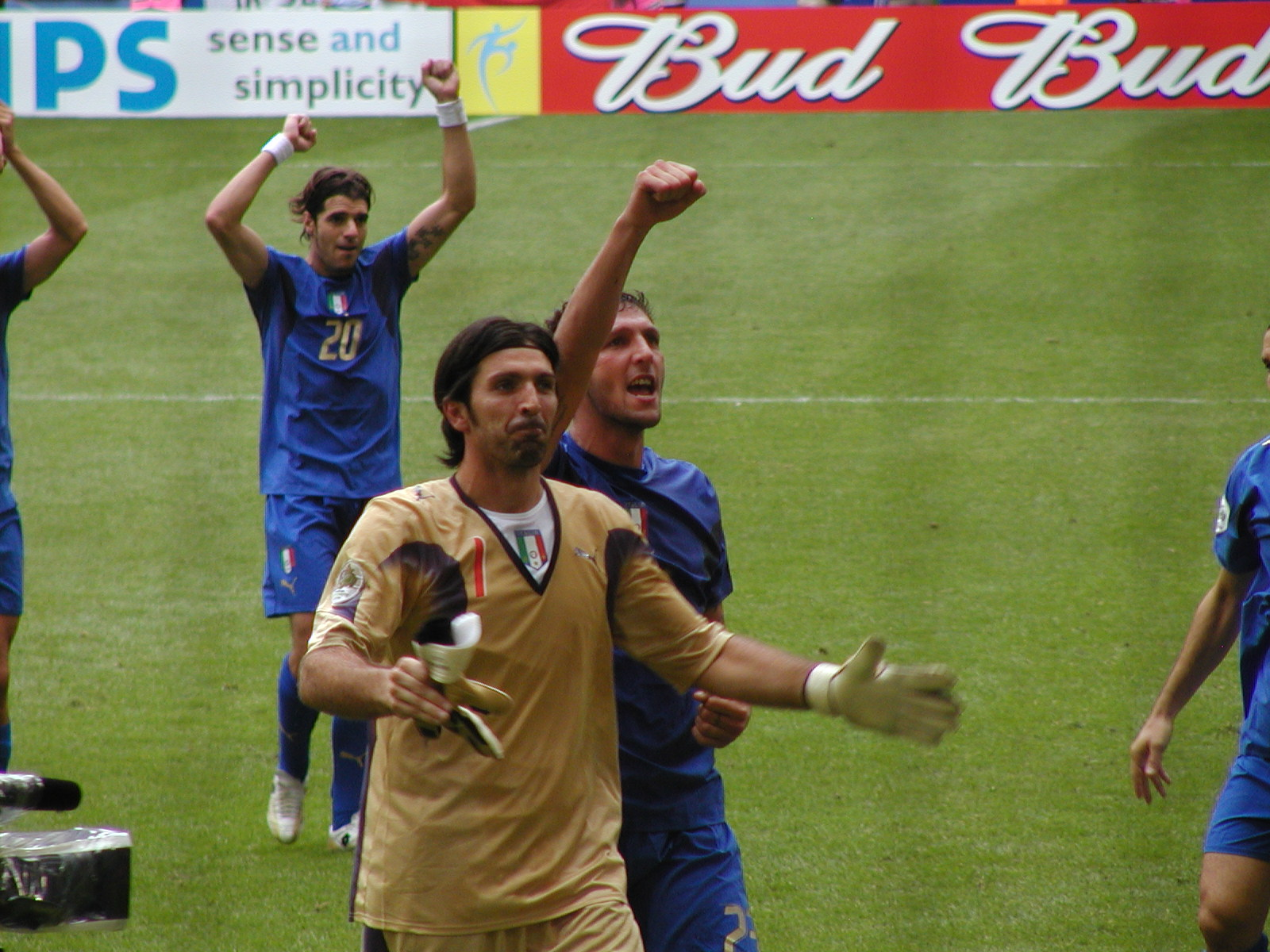
Buffon with Italy during the 2006 World Cup

Buffon was once again the first choice goalkeeper under his former Juventus coach and Trapattoni's replacement Marcello Lippi, as Italy finished first in their 2006 World Cup qualifying group. Although his place in Italy's 2006 World Cup was initially in doubt, as he was being investigated for possible involvement in the 2006 Calciopoli scandal, he was later named by Lippi as Italy's starting goalkeeper for the tournament.

During the 2006 World Cup finals, Buffon was in excellent form, setting a World Cup record by conceding just two goals in seven matches, and keeping five clean sheets. In addition, he posted a 453-minute scoreless streak, only 64 minutes short of compatriot Walter Zenga's all-time unbeaten record from the 1990 World Cup. The only goals he conceded were not in open play; an own goal by teammate Cristian Zaccardo after a free-kick against the United States in Italy's second match of the group stage, and a Zinedine Zidane penalty in the final against France. In the final, Buffon later made an important save in extra time on a header from eventual Golden Ball winner Zidane, which Buffon later described as the most important save of his career. The match ended 1–1 after extra time and was followed by a penalty shootout in which neither Buffon nor Fabien Barthez saved a spot kick. The lone miss was David Trezeguet's effort which hit the bottom of the crossbar and failed to cross the line, enabling Italy's Fabio Grosso to seal the victory for Italy. Buffon was named Man of the Match in Italy's 1–0 victory over Australia in the round of 16, and later also received the Yashin Award as the best goalkeeper of the tournament, producing 40 saves, and was elected to the Team of the Tournament. Buffon also finished second to compatriot Fabio Cannavaro in the 2006 Ballon d'Or and eighth in the FIFA World Player of the Year for his performances that season, and was named in the 2006 FIFPro World XI and the 2006 UEFA Team of the Year. In 2013, Nick Miller of ESPN FC named Buffon's save against Lukas Podolski in Italy's 2–0 victory against hosts Germany in the semi-finals as one of the greatest in World Cup history, placing it at number nine in his list of "World Cup's greatest ever saves". In 2019, Diario AS placed the latter save at number eight in their collection of "The 10 greatest saves of all time".

=== Post-World Cup victory ===
Buffon wore the captain's armband for Italy for the first time under manager Roberto Donadoni, in a 2–0 home win over Georgia in a Euro 2008 qualifier, due to the suspension of regular skipper Fabio Cannavaro. He was later named Italy's second acting captain for Euro 2008 after incumbent Cannavaro was ruled out of the tournament due to injury, and as Italy's replacement captain Alessandro Del Piero was frequently deployed as a substitute. He made his first appearance as Italy's captain in the nation's opening fixture of Euro 2008 on 9 June, a 3–0 defeat to the Netherlands. In the second game of the group stage against Romania on 13 June, he saved an 81st-minute penalty from Adrian Mutu to keep Italy's hopes alive following their opening defeat, as the match ended 1–1. Buffon kept a clean sheet against France in the final group game, and garnered praise in the media for a notable save against Karim Benzema, as Italy won 2–0 to advance to the quarter-finals. Italy were eliminated nine days later, when a 0–0 draw after extra time led to a 4–2 penalty shootout loss to eventual champions Spain; Buffon saved one penalty in the shootout and was elected to the Team of the Tournament for his performances.

Upon Marcello Lippi's return, Buffon was confirmed as the starting goalkeeper. He played all three group matches during Italy's disappointing 2009 FIFA Confederations Cup campaign in South Africa, in which they finished third in their group in a three-way, three-point tie. He earned his 100th cap on 14 November 2009 in a friendly match against the Netherlands. He was a key player in Italy's World Cup qualifying campaign as they finished top of their group, undefeated.

In the 2010 World Cup, Buffon was replaced at half-time in Italy's 1–1 draw in their opening group stage match against Paraguay after he had a problem with his sciatic nerve. He did not play again in the tournament and was substituted by Federico Marchetti. Reigning champions Italy disappointed and failed to win a match, finishing last in their group with just two points.

=== Italy captain and Euro 2012 runner-up ===
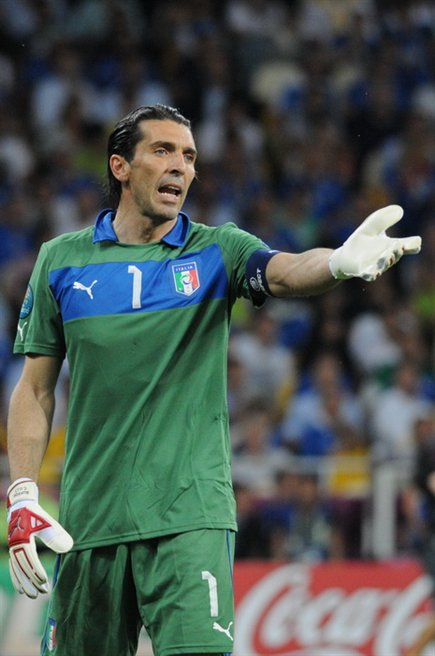
Buffon playing for Italy against Spain in the UEFA Euro 2012 final

After the international retirement of Fabio Cannavaro, Buffon became the new captain of the national team under new manager Cesare Prandelli. On 9 February 2011, after recovering from a back injury, Buffon played his first game as Italy's official captain in a 1–1 friendly draw against Germany in Dortmund. On 6 September 2011, after a 1–0 Italy win over Slovenia, Buffon surpassed Dino Zoff and established the new record for most minutes without conceding a goal in European Championship qualifying matches, going 644 minutes without conceding a goal; the win also allowed Italy to qualify for Euro 2012. On 11 October, prior to Italy's 3–0 win in a European qualifier against Northern Ireland, Buffon received a commemorative cap and medal from UEFA to mark his 100th international appearance. On 15 November 2011, in a friendly match against Uruguay, Buffon surpassed Zoff's number of caps for Italy (112), putting him behind only the retired former Italian captains Cannavaro and Paolo Maldini; he overtook Zoff in Italy's next friendly match against the United States on 29 February 2012. He was subsequently selected as Italy's starting goalkeeper and captain for Euro 2012 after leading his national side to qualify for the tournament undefeated, only conceding two goals.

At Euro 2012, Buffon captained Italy during the tournament. He kept a clean sheet against the Republic of Ireland in the third group stage match and against England, saving a crucial penalty from Ashley Cole in the quarter-final shootout, in which he was elected man of the match. In the semi-final match against Germany, Buffon made several important saves, only being beaten by a penalty from Mesut Özil in the 92nd minute; Italy won the match 2–1 and advanced to the final against defending European and World champions Spain. Italy were beaten 4–0 in the final as Spain claimed a record third consecutive major trophy, and their second consecutive European Championship title. Buffon was once again elected to the Team of the Tournament for his performances.

=== 2014 World Cup qualifying and 2013 Confederations Cup ===
On 26 March 2013, in a 2014 World Cup qualifying match against Malta, Buffon earned his 126th cap for Italy, equalling Paolo Maldini's number of caps for the national team. In the same match, Buffon saved a penalty from Michael Mifsud, helping Italy to a 2–0 away win.

Buffon was included in the Italian squad for the 2013 Confederations Cup in Brazil and played in every match of the tournament as captain. Italy progressed to the semi-finals of the competition for the first time, where they faced Spain, a rematch of the Euro 2012 final. After a 0–0 draw, Italy lost 7–6 in the resulting penalty shootout; neither Buffon or Spanish counterpart Iker Casillas were able to stop a penalty in the shootout; the lone miss, by Leonardo Bonucci, was hit over bar. In the third-place match, Italy defeated Uruguay 3–2 in the penalty shootout after a 2–2 deadlock following extra time; Buffon saved three penalties from Diego Forlán, Juventus teammate Martín Cáceres and Walter Gargano.

In the 2014 FIFA World Cup qualifying fixture against the Czech Republic, at Juventus Stadium in Turin on 10 September 2013, Buffon equalled Cannavaro as the Italy national team record appearance holder, with 136 caps. Italy won the match 2–1, allowing them to qualify for the 2014 World Cup in Brazil top of their group, with two games at hand; this was the first time that the Italian squad had done so. On 11 October 2013, in a 2–2 World Cup qualifier draw against Denmark, Buffon surpassed Cannavaro, becoming the sole record appearance holder for Italy, with 137. On 2 January 2014, Buffon was awarded the 2013 Pallone Azzurro award, which is given to the Italy national side's best player of the year.

=== 2014 World Cup ===
"Buffon is the Maradona of goalkeepers."

— Italy teammates on Buffon.

On 12 May, Buffon was named in Italy's 31-man preliminary World Cup squad by Cesare Prandelli, and on 31 May, he was named the starting goalkeeper and captain in the final squad. Italy were placed in Group D, in the so-called "group of death", with Costa Rica, England and Uruguay. Buffon became the third player to be part of five World Cup squads, tying the records held by Mexican goalkeeper Antonio Carbajal and German footballer Lothar Matthäus. Due to an ankle injury suffered in training, Buffon was not selected to start in Italy's first match of the World Cup against England on 14 June 2014.

In Italy's next group match, which ended in a 1–0 loss to Costa Rica, he captained his national side for the first time at a World Cup, the fourth World Cup in which he appeared. In Italy's final group game against Uruguay, Buffon saved shots from Luis Suárez and Nicolás Lodeiro, as Italy were reduced to ten men following Claudio Marchisio's controversial red card. Buffon was eventually beaten in the 81st minute by a Diego Godín header, moments after Luis Suárez's bite on Giorgio Chiellini. Buffon was voted man of the match for his performance. Italy finished in third place in their group, and were eliminated in the group stage for a second consecutive World Cup.

=== Euro 2016 ===
Buffon made his first appearance for Italy under new manager Antonio Conte on 9 September 2014, captaining his team in their opening European Championship qualifying match against Norway in Oslo. He kept a clean sheet as Italy won the match 2–0. On 12 June 2015, Buffon became the first player to appear in 50 UEFA competitive international matches in Italy's 1–1 away draw against Croatia in a European qualifying match. Buffon saved an early Mario Mandžukić penalty, but was taken off at half time due to injury. He made his 150th appearance for Italy on 6 September 2015, keeping a clean sheet in a 1–0 home win over Bulgaria, his 62nd clean sheet at the international level.

After the Euro qualification, Buffon stated that Euro 2016 would be the final European Championship of his career, but expressed his intentions to retire only after the 2018 World Cup, which would see him play up to the age of 40. On 31 May 2016, Buffon was named the captain of Conte's 23-man Italy squad for Euro 2016. In Italy's first game of the tournament on 13 June, Buffon kept a clean sheet in a 2–0 victory over Belgium. This was Buffon's 14th appearance at the European Championships, making him Italy's out-right most capped player of all time in the tournament, after overtaking Maldini, Del Piero and Cassano; with his fourth tournament appearance, he also equalled Del Piero for the most UEFA European Championships played in by an Italian player. He kept another clean sheet in a 1–0 win over Sweden in Italy's second group fixture on 17 June, which allowed his nation to top the group and advance to the second round. Due to fever, Buffon was rested in Italy's final group match. He returned to the starting line-up for Italy's round of 16 fixture against Spain on 27 June, making a crucial injury time save on Gerard Piqué to earn his third consecutive clean sheet of the tournament, as Italy avenged their Euro 2012 final defeat with a 2–0 victory over the defending champions. After a 1–1 draw following extra time in Italy's quarter-final fixture against Germany on 2 July, Buffon saved one penalty in the resulting shootout, although the reigning World Cup champions would ultimately emerge victorious following a 6–5 shootout loss. His one on one save to deny Mario Gómez in regulation time was later nominated for the UEFA Save of the Season Award, later coming in third.

=== 2018 World Cup qualifying campaign, retirement and brief return ===
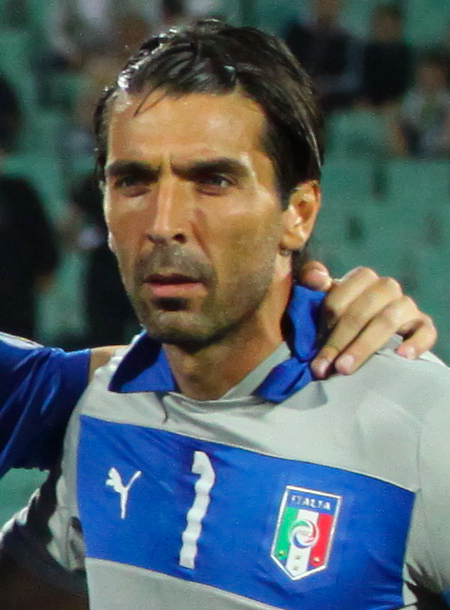
Having represented his country a record 176 times, Buffon is the most capped player in Italian history

On 6 October 2016, Buffon made his 164th appearance for Italy in a 1–1 draw against Spain in a 2018 World Cup qualifying match in Turin, under manager Gian Piero Ventura, making him the joint eighth-most capped international player of all time with Cobi Jones, and the second-most capped active international player, behind only Iker Casillas. On 15 November 2016, Buffon won his 167th Italy cap in their friendly 0–0 draw in Milan against Germany, equalling the European international appearance record jointly held by Iker Casillas and Vitālijs Astafjevs, and making him the most capped active international player in the world alongside Casillas. On 1 January 2017, Buffon was awarded the 2016 Pallone Azzurro Award, as Italy's best international player throughout the calendar year, becoming the first player to win the award more than once. On 24 March, Buffon made his 1,000th career appearance, keeping a clean sheet (his 426th overall for club and country) in a 2–0 home over Albania in a World Cup qualifier, becoming the 18th player to reach this milestone; in the process, he also became the sole most capped European player at international level, with his 168th appearance for Italy, and the joint fifth-most capped male international footballer of all time, alongside Iván Hurtado.

On 2 September, Buffon made his 170th international appearance in a 3–0 away defeat to Spain in a World Cup qualifier; he later extended his European international appearance record with his 172nd appearance for Italy on 6 October, in a 1–1 home draw against Macedonia in a 2018 World Cup qualifier, making him the fourth-most capped male international footballer of all time, ahead of Egyptian striker Hossam Hassan (169), and behind only Egyptian midfielder Ahmed Hassan (184), Saudi Arabian goalkeeper Mohamed Al-Deayea (178), and Mexican defender Claudio Suárez (177).

Buffon's 175th international appearance came on 13 November, in the second leg of the World Cup play-offs against Sweden, at the San Siro Stadium in Milan. Although he kept a clean sheet in the 0–0 draw, Italy's 1–0 away loss in the first leg on 10 November saw Sweden advance on aggregate, meaning that Italy had failed to qualify for the World Cup for the first time in 60 years. Although he had originally intended to retire after competing in the 2018 World Cup, following the match and Italy's failure to qualify the tournament, an emotional and tearful Buffon communicated his retirement from international football, stating: "I'm not sorry for myself but all of Italian football. We failed at something which also means something on a social level. There's regret at finishing like that, not because time passes. There is certainly a future for Italian football, as we have pride, ability, determination and after bad tumbles, we always find a way to get back on our feet."

He later confirmed his international retirement on social media, tweeting from the national team's official account: "We are proud, we are strong, we are stubborn. We will pick ourselves up as we have always done. I am leaving a national team set-up that will know how to pick itself up again. Best wishes to everybody, and especially to those with whom I have shared this beautiful journey." After winning the Serie A Footballer of the Year Award later that month, Buffon hinted that he could possibly play for Italy again, stating: "I took a break from the national team. I'm of a certain age, so it's right for me to take a pause. With the way I am though, both for Juventus and for the national team I have always considered myself a soldier, so I could never desert a possible call in the future if needed. Even at 60, if there were a total absence of goalkeepers and they asked me to come back, I'd be there, because I have in me the concept of nation."

On 17 March 2018, despite Buffon's initial decision to retire, he was called up for Italy's March friendlies against Argentina and England by caretaker manager Luigi Di Biagio. When asked why he had accepted a call-up after initially announcing his international retirement, he responded: "I'm a consistent person, who feels a great sense of responsibility, that alone is enough to explain my presence. In addition, I've always been an unifying element in the national set-up, and I'd like my presence to be seen in this way. The young lads will grow, some already have, and from tomorrow they'll get their chance," and "I am here for Astori [a former international teammate of Buffon's who had recently died from a heart attack] as well, it's another reason why I wanted to be here." On 23 March, Buffon started in goal for Italy for the 176th time, in a friendly against Argentina, and also surpassed Cannavaro to become the record appearance holder as Italy captain, with 80; Italy were defeated by Argentina 2–0. On 17 May 2018, Buffon announced in a press conference with Juventus that he would not return to the national team for its May and June friendlies.

== Player profile ==
=== Style of play and reception ===
"The best goalkeeper I have ever faced was Buffon. When I was at Juventus, it was already difficult to get past Cannavaro and Thuram in defence during training sessions. If I managed to get past them, then I would find Buffon, and it was almost impossible to beat him!"

— Zlatan Ibrahimović.

Known for his consistency throughout his career, Buffon received recognition from managers, players, and goalkeeping colleagues for his composure under pressure, work-rate, and longevity. (Note: See) Regarded as one of the greatest goalkeepers of all time, he has been cited by subsequent players as a major influence and role model. He was described as "an agile, strong, and commanding shot-stopper, who is hugely experienced at the highest level" and "an accomplished and well respected keeper" with an "[e]xcellent positional sense, courage, power and class".

Buffon was praised for his athleticism, his "outstanding shot-stopping", his acrobatic dives, and his quick reflexes, as well as his ability to produce decisive saves, despite being a tall, large and physically imposing goalkeeper. Although he at times was criticised for not being particularly adept at stopping penalties, he was also proven to be effective in this area, as demonstrated by his penalty-saving record; with sixteen saves, he has stopped the joint-fifth-highest number of penalties in Serie A history, alongside Giuseppe Moro.

"There have been some very good goalkeepers in my era, but Buffon is there for consistency. Most of the goalkeepers have had times when their form has not been so good, but Buffon has been at such a high level for so long."

— Ronaldinho on choosing Buffon as the goalkeeper in his all-time top XI.

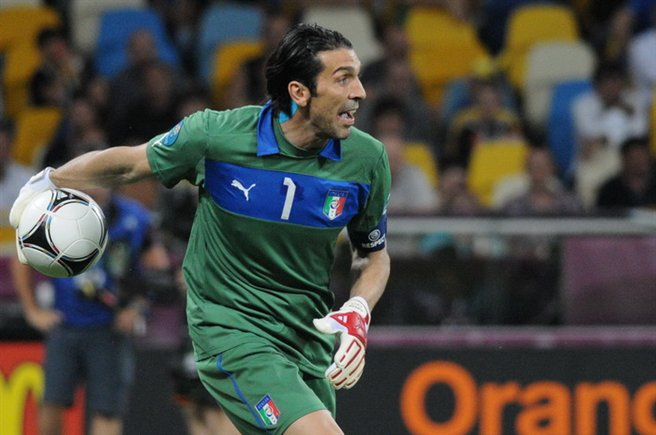
Buffon with the ball for Italy at UEFA Euro 2012

In his prime, Buffon was a talented, complete, brave, aggressive, and often instinctive and frenetic goalkeeper, who was recognised for his speed, prowess, and anticipation when coming off his line in one on one situations, as well as his confidence, goalkeeping technique, reactions, and ability to get to ground quickly to collect, parry, or even challenge for the ball with his feet; when playing in teams that relied upon high defensive lines and a zonal marking system, he often functioned as a sweeper-keeper, frequently rushing out of his area to clear the ball or face opponents who had beaten the offside trap. (Note: See) He was also highly regarded for his handling, aerial ability, and command of the area on high balls; (Note: See) however, throughout his career, Buffon was occasionally accused by pundits of being overly cautious on crosses and of not always coming out to collect them, and also drew criticism for preferring to punch the ball out to his teammates at times rather than holding on to it.

Although not as adept with the ball at his feet as the newer generation of goalkeepers that emerged in his later career, Buffon also possessed good footwork, as well as reliable distribution, which enabled him to adapt to more contemporary systems requiring goalkeepers to play with their feet more frequently and be involved in the build-up of plays. His confidence in possession allowed him to play the ball out from the back on the ground to his defenders and start swift counter-attacks, as well as find his teammates further up the pitch or out on the wing with deeper kicks with his right foot. In his youth, his ball skills even occasionally led him to take on opponents, whenever he was put under pressure by on-running strikers. (Note: See)

"Technically, with his feet, you wouldn't say he looks a natural. He's not a keeper like Marc-André ter Stegen, Claudio Bravo or Manuel Neuer. But his positioning is perfect. He's very deep. He never strays far from his line. That gives him an extra split second to see the ball, judge the flight, move his feet. And more often than not, he catches the ball. The other thing that stands out is his shape when diving. It's almost faultless. His arms and legs and body are all in sync. Everything is solid."

— Football coach, pundit and former Sunderland goalkeeper David Preece on Buffon.

After struggling with a series of injuries between 2008 and 2010, Buffon effectively adapted his style of goalkeeping to the physical effects of ageing, while also modifying his diet and training regime, and as a result, developed into a less spectacular, but more efficient, calm, and reflective goalkeeper; despite the loss of some of his physical strength, explosiveness, speed and mobility, he continued to excel at the highest level due to the consistency of his performances, as well as his positioning between the posts, tactical intelligence, decision-making, and his ability to read the game and organise his defence. (Note: See) In contrast with his goalkeeping style in his early career, Buffon often preferred to position himself in deeper areas closer to his line in his later career, particularly in one-on-one situations, in order to increase the distance between himself and his opponent, giving himself more time to assess situations and parry the ball. In addition to his goalkeeping abilities, Buffon was singled out for his charisma, strong mentality, discipline in training, vocal presence in goal, and leadership, and was described as "a key dressing room personality".

=== Legacy ===
Buffon is widely regarded by players, pundits and managers as one of the greatest goalkeepers of all time, (Note: See) and by some in the sport as the greatest ever. (Note: See) In the introduction of his 2008 autobiography, Numero 1 (Number 1), Roberto Perrone describes him as: "the greatest goalkeeper in the world, one of the four or five that will always live on in the memory of world football". In 2012, he was voted the 20th best footballer in the world by The Guardian, finishing as the second-highest ranked goalkeeper, behind Iker Casillas. Buffon was awarded the Nereo Rocco Prize on 2 September 2014, which is given to a footballer in recognition of their career. In 2015, France Football rated him as one of the ten best footballers in the world over the age of 36. In 2016, he was named the greatest goalkeeper in history by the same magazine. Later that year, he was also voted the UEFA Champions League's greatest goalkeeper of all time in an official UEFA online Twitter poll. In 2015, UEFA ranked Buffon as the third-best player ever not to have won the Champions League, while in 2019, FourFourTwo placed Buffon at number two behind only Ronaldo in their list of "The 25 best players never to win the Champions League". In May 2020, Sky Sports ranked him as the fourth-best player ever to have not won the Champions League or European Cup, and he was also voted the "Greatest Goalkeeper Ever" by users of Eurosport.com.

=== Attire ===
Although when he started his career it was more common for goalkeepers to wear long-sleeved jerseys, Buffon was always known for wearing short-sleeves throughout his entire career, even during the winter months; when asked in a 2017 interview with FourFourTwo why he preferred to wear short sleeves, he commented: "I really don't know why. It's just something that I've always done, right from the time I first started playing in goal. It always felt good. And now look: lots of goalkeepers do it. I've started a fashion." When asked again about his goalkeeping attire in a 2018 interview with L'Équipe's magazine Sports et Style, he stated that he first cut the sleeves off of his goalkeeping kit as a youngster, "for convenience and to feel more comfortable", also adding that he "feel[s] more when the ball touches [his] forearms".

== After retirement ==
After retiring from professional football, Buffon was appointed by the Italian Football Federation (FIGC) as the head of delegation of the Italy national team on 5 August 2023, a position last held by the late Gianluca Vialli. In December 2023, he received his sporting director diploma through the Coverciano technical centre. On 2 April 2026, two days after Italy failed to qualify for the 2026 World Cup, Buffon resigned from this role. In August 2024, Buffon received the UEFA President's Award, presented by UEFA president Aleksander Čeferin.

== Outside of professional football ==
=== Personal life ===
Buffon is Catholic. He suffers from spheksophobia, as a result of being allergic to wasp stings.

In 2000, Buffon risked a four-year prison sentence for falsifying a high school accounting diploma in order to enroll for a law degree at the University of Parma, and ultimately paid a 6,350,000 Lire fine in 2001; he later described the incident as his biggest regret in life, stating that it had been a dishonest gesture.

In the early 2000s, Buffon had been engaged to Italian sprinter Vincenza Calì. In 2005, Buffon began a relationship with Czech model Alena Šeredová, marrying in June 2011. They have two sons, Louis Thomas (born in 2007 and named after Buffon's idol Thomas N'Kono) and David Lee (born in 2009 and named after Van Halen singer David Lee Roth). In May 2014, Buffon announced that he had separated from Šeredová after three years of marriage. Louis Buffon followed in the footsteps of his father and became a footballer. As of 2025, he plays as a forward for Serie A outfit Pisa SC and received a call-up for the Czech Republic national under-18 football team.

Soon after divorce, Buffon became romantically linked to Italian sports pundit, journalist and television host Ilaria D'Amico. In 2015, Buffon announced that the couple were expecting a child together. On 6 January 2016, the couple announced the birth of their son Leopoldo Mattia. In the summer of 2017, the pair became engaged. On 28 September 2024, Buffon and D'Amico married in Tuscany.

On 14 November 2008, Buffon released the Italian edition of his autobiography, Numero 1 (Number 1), which was written in collaboration with writer and Corriere della Sera journalist Roberto Perrone. In his autobiography, he revealed that he had suffered with bouts of depression during the 2003–04 season, following Juventus' penalty shoot-out defeat in the 2003 Champions League final, and due to Juventus' negative performance that season. In 2013, he elaborated that, between December 2003 and June 2004, he regularly visited a psychologist, but refused to take medication, and he overcame his depression prior to Euro 2004. In January 2019, he further revealed that he had even suffered from panic attacks due to his depression during his early career with Juventus, and that he even missed a game as a result.

In June 2017, Buffon received honorary citizenship from the city of Latisana. In November 2024, he released his second autobiography, Cadere, rialzarsi, cadere, rialzarsi ("To fall, get back up again, fall, get back up again"), co-written with Mario Desiati and published by Mondadori.

In November 2022, a 60 Minutes story on the Panini Group World Cup stickers revealed that Buffon is an avid collector.

=== Media and endorsements ===
Buffon was sponsored by German sportswear company Puma during his career, wearing Puma gloves and Puma King football boots, and has appeared in Puma commercials. Buffon has also featured in Pepsi commercials, including an advertisement for the 2002 World Cup in Korea and Japan, where he lined up alongside several other footballers, including David Beckham, Raúl and Roberto Carlos, in taking on a team of sumo players. In 2009, Buffon, an avid poker player and gambler, was hired by PokerStars to endorse their products.

Buffon was featured on the cover of the Italian edition of Konami's PES 2008, alongside global coverstar Cristiano Ronaldo. Buffon also features in EA Sports' FIFA video game series, and was named alongside Manuel Neuer, Iker Casillas and Petr Čech in the Ultimate Team Best Goalkeepers in FIFA 14. He was included as one of the Ultimate Team Icons for EA Sports FC 25.

In 2011, he featured in a commercial for Italian mineral water company Ferrarelle.

In 2016, Buffon was chosen as the new face of Amica Chips. The following year, he was instead chosen as the new face of Head & Shoulders in Italy.

Throughout the 2017–18 season, Buffon appeared in the Netflix docu-series First Team: Juventus.

In May 2018, Buffon announced his partnership with the video game World of Tanks. Late that same year, he also featured in a commercial for Birra Moretti.

In December 2019, Buffon announced his collaboration with the Spanish clothing and accessories retailer Kimoa, which is owned by Spanish race car driver Fernando Alonso, to release four different limited edition models of sunglasses, which represent four European cities associated with Buffon's football career and achievements: Berlin (the location of the victorious 2006 World Cup final), Moscow (the city in which he made his international debut and won the UEFA Cup), Paris (the city in which his former club PSG is based), and Turin (the city in which his club at the time, Juventus, is based).

In January 2020, Buffon made a cameo appearance in the music video for "Ti saprò aspettare" by Biagio Antonacci, where he coaches a children's football team against Antonacci as the opposing coach. In the last scene, Buffon takes a shot on Antonacci as goalkeeper, with the video intentionally stopping before the ball is either scored or saved.

=== Business ===
On 16 July 2010, Buffon became a share-holding partner of his hometown club Carrarese; he initially owned 50% of the club's shares, along with Cristiano Lucarelli and Maurizio Mian. On 10 June 2011, he acquired an additional 20% of the club's shares. On 6 July 2012, Buffon become the sole shareholder of Carrarese through his family's company, Buffon & co. In May 2015, Buffon stated that he would be stepping down from his position as the owner of Carrarese at the end of the 2014–15 season; in July, he sold 70% of Carrarese's shares to the Italian real estate developer Raffaele Tartaglia, who took control of the club, although Buffon still remained with the club as a minority shareholder. After continuing to struggle with financial difficulties, the club officially declared bankruptcy on 11 March 2016.

On 30 May 2011, he joined the board of directors of the Italian textile company Zucchi Group S.p.A., with a share of 19.4%. Despite the company's financial difficulties, in 2015, Buffon, who had by then acquired 56% of the company's shares, had reportedly invested €20 million in order to save the company from bankruptcy. In late December, Zucchi was acquired by a French investment fund, Astrance Capital, which took control of Buffon's company GB Holding, under an agreement to restructure Zucchi Group's debt, while Buffon was allowed to retain a 15% share in the company.

In 2017, Buffon launched his own brand of wine under the name "Buffon #1".

=== Philanthropy ===
Buffon is also known for his charity work. In addition to his other charitable endeavours, after every match he auctioned off his personalised captain's armband for charity.

In 2012, Buffon joined the "Respect Diversity" Programme, through UEFA, which aimed to fight against racism, discrimination and intolerance in football.

On 1 September 2014, Buffon, along with many current and former footballing stars, took part in the "Match for Peace", which was played at Rome's Stadio Olimpico, with the proceeds being donated to charity.

In October 2019, Buffon was named a UN Goodwill Ambassador for the World Food Programme.

=== Union work ===
On 7 May 2012, Buffon was elected vice-president of the Italian Footballers' Association (AIC); this was the first time an active footballer had held this position.

=== Politics ===
Prior to the 2013 Italian general election, Buffon publicly endorsed the prime minister at the time, Mario Monti. Buffon was one of over 80 Italian celebrities to sign a petition in favour of the 2016 Italian constitutional referendum promoted by the Democratic Party under then prime minister Matteo Renzi. In 2021, Buffon described himself politically as an anarcho-conservative. In 2025, on the occasion of the radical right festival Atreju, Buffon praised Italian PM Giorgia Meloni, claiming that she represents the nation in the best way.

== Career statistics ==
=== Club ===
Appearances and goals by club, season and competition
Club	Season	League			National cup (Note: Includes Coppa Italia, Coupe de France)		League cup (Note: Includes Coupe de la Ligue)		Europe		Other		Total	
Club	Season	Division	Apps	Goals	Apps	Goals	Apps	Goals	Apps	Goals	Apps	Goals	Apps	Goals
Parma	1995–96	Serie A	9	0	0	0	—		0	0	0	0	9	0
Parma	1996–97	Serie A	27	0	0	0	—		1 (Note: Appearances in UEFA Cup)	0	—		28	0
Parma	1997–98	Serie A	32	0	6	0	—		8 (Note: Appearances in UEFA Champions League)	0	—		46	0
Parma	1998–99	Serie A	34	0	6	0	—		11	0	—		51	0
Parma	1999–2000	Serie A	32	0	0	0	—		9 (Note: Two appearances in UEFA Champions League, seven appearances in UEFA Cup)	0	2 (Note: One appearance in Supercoppa Italiana, one appearance in 4th-place Serie A UEFA Champions League tie-breaker)	0	43	0
Parma	2000–01	Serie A	34	0	2	0	—		7	0	—		43	0
Parma	Total		168	0	14	0	—		36	0	2	0	220	0
Juventus	2001–02	Serie A	34	0	1	0	—		10	0	—		45	0
Juventus	2002–03	Serie A	32	0	0	0	—		15	0	1 (Note: Appearance in Supercoppa Italiana)	0	48	0
Juventus	2003–04	Serie A	32	0	0	0	—		6	0	1	0	39	0
Juventus	2004–05	Serie A	37	0	0	0	—		11	0	—		48	0
Juventus	2005–06	Serie A	18	0	2	0	—		4	0	0	0	24	0
Juventus	2006–07	Serie B	37	0	3	0	—		—		—		40	0
Juventus	2007–08	Serie A	34	0	1	0	—		—		—		35	0
Juventus	2008–09	Serie A	23	0	2	0	—		5	0	—		30	0
Juventus	2009–10	Serie A	27	0	1	0	—		7 (Note: Six appearances in UEFA Champions League, one appearance in UEFA Europa League)	0	—		35	0
Juventus	2010–11	Serie A	16	0	1	0	—		0	0	—		17	0
Juventus	2011–12	Serie A	35	0	0	0	—		—		—		35	0
Juventus	2012–13	Serie A	32	0	1	0	—		10	0	1	0	44	0
Juventus	2013–14	Serie A	33	0	0	0	—		14 (Note: Six appearances in UEFA Champions League, eight appearances in UEFA Europa League)	0	1	0	48	0
Juventus	2014–15	Serie A	33	0	0	0	—		13	0	1	0	47	0
Juventus	2015–16	Serie A	35	0	0	0	—		8	0	1	0	44	0
Juventus	2016–17	Serie A	30	0	0	0	—		12	0	1	0	43	0
Juventus	2017–18	Serie A	21	0	3	0	—		9	0	1	0	34	0
Juventus	Total		509	0	15	0	—		124	0	8	0	656	0
Paris Saint-Germain	2018–19	Ligue 1	17	0	1	0	1	0	5	0	1 (Note: Appearance in Trophée des Champions)	0	25	0
Juventus	2019–20	Serie A	9	0	5	0	—		1	0	0	0	15	0
Juventus	2020–21	Serie A	8	0	5	0	—		1	0	0	0	14	0
Juventus	Total		17	0	10	0	—		2	0	0	0	29	0
Parma	2021–22	Serie B	26	0	0	0	—		—		—		26	0
Parma	2022–23	Serie B	17	0	1	0	—		—		1 (Note: Appearance in Serie B promotion play-offs)	0	19	0
Parma	Total		43	0	1	0	—		—		1	0	45	0
Career total			754	0	41	0	1	0	167	0	12	0	975	0

=== International ===
Appearances and goals by national team and year
National team	Year	Apps	Goals
Italy	1997	1	0
Italy	1998	3	0
Italy	1999	8	0
Italy	2000	4	0
Italy	2001	7	0
Italy	2002	12	0
Italy	2003	7	0
Italy	2004	12	0
Italy	2005	3	0
Italy	2006	15	0
Italy	2007	8	0
Italy	2008	9	0
Italy	2009	11	0
Italy	2010	2	0
Italy	2011	10	0
Italy	2012	11	0
Italy	2013	15	0
Italy	2014	8	0
Italy	2015	8	0
Italy	2016	13	0
Italy	2017	8	0
Italy	2018	1	0
Total		176	0

== Honours ==
Parma

- Coppa Italia: 1998–99
- Supercoppa Italiana: 1999
- UEFA Cup: 1998–99

Juventus

- Serie A: 2001–02, 2002–03, 2011–12, 2012–13, 2013–14, 2014–15, 2015–16, 2016–17, 2017–18, 2019–20
- Serie B: 2006–07
- Coppa Italia: 2014–15, 2015–16, 2016–17, 2017–18, 2020–21
- Supercoppa Italiana: 2002, 2003, 2012, 2013, 2015, 2020
- UEFA Champions League runner-up: 2002–03, 2014–15, 2016–17

Paris Saint-Germain

- Ligue 1: 2018–19
- Coupe de France runner-up: 2018–19
- Trophée des Champions: 2018

Italy U21

- UEFA European Under-21 Championship: 1996
- Mediterranean Games: 1997

Italy

- FIFA World Cup: 2006
- UEFA European Championship runner-up: 2012

Individual

- Bravo Award: 1999
- Serie A Goalkeeper of the Year Award: 1999, 2001, 2002, 2003, 2004, 2005, 2006, 2008, 2012, 2014, 2015, 2016, 2017
- UEFA Club Goalkeeper of the Year: 2002–03
- UEFA Club Footballer of the Year: 2002–03
- UEFA Team of the Year: 2003, 2004, 2006, 2016, 2017
- ESM Team of the Year: 2002–03, 2016–17
- Best European Goalkeeper: 2003, 2016, 2017
- Ballon d'Or runner-up 2006, 4th place 2017
- IFFHS World's Best Goalkeeper: 2003, 2004, 2006, 2007, 2017
- IFFHS World's Best Goalkeeper: runner-up 2008, 2009, 2012, 2013, 2015, 2016
- IFFHS World's Best Goalkeeper: 3rd place 2001, 2005, 2018
- FIFA 100
- FIFA World Cup Yashin Award: 2006
- FIFA World Cup All-Star Team: 2006
- Serie A "Fan" Award: 2006, 2007
- FIFA FIFPro World XI: 2006, 2007, 2017
- UEFA European Championship Team of the Tournament: 2008, 2012
- Sports Illustrated Team of the Decade: 2009
- ESPN World Team of the Decade: 2009
- IFFHS Best Goalkeeper of the Decade 2001–2010
- IFFHS Best Goalkeeper of the Decade 2011–2020: 2nd
- IFFHS Best Goalkeeper of the 21st Century 2001–2020
- IFFHS Best Goalkeeper of the Past 25 Years: 1987–2012
- IFFHS All Time World's Best Goalkeeper: 1987–2020
- Serie A Team of the Year: 2012, 2014, 2015, 2016, 2017
- AIC Legend Special Award: 2023
- Pallone Azzurro: 2013, 2016
- UEFA Europa League Squad of the Season: 2013–14
- Premio Nereo Rocco: 2014
- UEFA Champions League Squad of the Season: 2014–15, 2016–17
- UEFA Ultimate Team of the Year substitute (published 2015)
- France Football World XI: 2015
- Gianni Brera Award for Sportsman of the Year: 2015
- Juventus MVP of the Year: 2015–16
- UEFA Euro All-time XI (published 2016)
- Premio Nazionale Carriera Esemplare "Gaetano Scirea": 2016
- Golden Foot: 2016
- Serie A Footballer of the Year: 2016–17
- The Best FIFA Goalkeeper: 2017
- UEFA Champions League Goalkeeper of the Season: 2016–17
- IFFHS Men's World Team: 2017
- Gazzetta Sports Awards Man of the Year: 2017
- Juventus Greatest XI of All Time: 2017
- FourFourTwo best goalkeeper of the 21st century: 2019
- Ballon d'Or Dream Team (Silver): 2020
- IFFHS All-time Men's B Dream Team: 2021
- Premio Bulgarelli Number 8 Lifetime Achievement Award: 2024
- Globe Soccer Awards Player Career Award: 2024
- UEFA President's Award: 2024
- Juventus FC Hall of Fame: 2025
- IFFHS Legends

Records

- Most appearances in Serie A: 657
- Second-most appearances for Juventus in all competitions: 685, behind Alessandro Del Piero, 705
- Most appearances for Juventus in Serie A: 489
- Most appearances for Juventus in Italian League matches (includes Serie A and Serie B): 526
- Most appearances for Juventus in the Supercoppa Italiana: 8
- Most appearances for Juventus in the UEFA Champions League: 117 (including 4 in the qualifying rounds)
- Most appearances for Juventus in UEFA club competitions: 126
- Second-most appearances for Juventus in international club competitions: 126, behind Alessandro Del Piero, 130
- Joint-most appearances for Juventus in Serie B: 37, alongside Federico Balzaretti and Alessandro Birindelli
- Most all-time minutes played for Juventus in all competitions: 61,412
- Most all-time minutes played for Juventus in Serie A: 43,549
- Most career club appearances by an Italian player: 975
- Most appearances in Europe's top five leagues: 674 (657 in Serie A and 17 in Ligue 1)
- Most appearances for Italy senior team: 176
- Most all-time minutes played for Italy senior team: 15,251
- Most appearances for Italy in FIFA World Cup qualification matches: 39
- Joint second-most appearances for Italy in UEFA European Championship matches: 17, alongside Giorgio Chiellini, and behind Leonardo Bonucci, 18
- Most appearances for Italy in UEFA European Championship qualifying matches: 41
- Most appearances for Italy in UEFA European Championship (final tournament and qualifying matches): 58
- Joint-most appearances for Italy in FIFA Confederations Cup matches: 8, alongside Giorgio Chiellini and Riccardo Montolivo
- Most appearances as captain for Italy senior team: 80
- Most goalkeeper appearances as captain for Italy senior team: 80
- Most appearances by a goalkeeper at the UEFA European Championship: 17
- Joint-fewest goals conceded in a single UEFA European Championship edition (at least 3 matches played): 1 goal in 4 appearances at Euro 2016, alongside Iker Casillas in 2012, Thomas Myhre in 2000 and Dino Zoff in 1968
- Longest consecutive run without conceding a goal in a single Serie A season: 974 minutes in 2015–16
- Most consecutive clean sheets in a single Serie A season: 10 in 2015–16
- Joint-most clean sheets in a single Serie A season: 21 in 2011–12 and 2015–16
- Longest consecutive run without conceding a goal in the qualifying stages of the UEFA European Championship: 644 minutes in 2010 and 2011
- One of only nine players to take part in five FIFA World Cups: 1998, 2002, 2006, 2010 and 2014
- Most clean sheets by an individual goalkeeper in all-time: 501
- Most clean sheets for Italy senior team: 77 (second-most clean sheets in international football)
- Most clean sheets for Italy at the FIFA World Cup: 6
- Most clean sheets for Italy at the UEFA European Championship: 8
- Most clean sheets for Italy at the FIFA Confederations Cup: 1
- Most clean sheets for Italy in FIFA World Cup qualification matches: 21
- Most clean sheets for Italy in UEFA European Championship qualifying matches: 23
- Most clean sheets in Serie A: 299
- Most clean sheets by a goalkeeper in men's association football: 505
- Third-most clean sheets in the UEFA Champions League: 52 (excluding 3 in the qualifying rounds), behind Iker Casillas, 57 (excluding 2 in qualifying) and Manuel Neuer, 62 (excluding 2 in qualifying)
- Third-most clean sheets kept in a single UEFA Champions League season: 8 (2016–17 season)
- Most appearances in the UEFA Champions League by an Italian player: 124 (excluding 8 in the qualifying rounds) (Note: Tally does not include appearances of players who also appeared in the European Cup prior to the establishment of the UEFA Champions League during the 1992–93 season.)
- Joint sixth-most appearances in UEFA club competitions: 167 (124 in the UEFA Champions League, 8 in the UEFA Champions League qualifying rounds and 35 in the UEFA Cup/Europa League)
- Third-longest consecutive run without conceding a goal in the UEFA Champions League: 690 minutes in 2016–17, behind Ederson, 706, and Jens Lehmann, 853
- Third-most appearances by a goalkeeper in the UEFA Champions League: 132 (including 8 in the qualifying rounds), behind Iker Casillas, 181 (including 4 in qualifying rounds) and Manuel Neuer, 133 (including 2 in the qualifying rounds)
- Third-most appearances by a goalkeeper in UEFA club competitions: 167, behind Iker Casillas, 188, and Pepe Reina, 183
- Most UEFA Champions League final appearances without a victory: 3, alongside Paolo Montero
- Most penalties saved for Italy senior team: 5
- Joint-most penalties saved in shoot-outs at the UEFA European Championship: 3, alongside Iker Casillas, Gianluigi Donnarumma and Unai Simón
- Joint third-most penalties saved in the UEFA Champions League (excluding shoot-outs): 4 (out of 13), alongside Manuel Neuer (out of 11), and behind Iker Casillas, 7 (out of 23) and Petr Čech, 5 (out of 11)
- Fourth-most senior international appearances by a European footballer: 176, behind Cristiano Ronaldo, 233, Luka Modrić, 202 and Sergio Ramos, 180
- Fourteenth-most men's senior international appearances: 176
- Second-most appearances in UEFA European Championship (final tournament and qualifying matches): 58, behind Cristiano Ronaldo, 69
- Only goalkeeper to ever win the UEFA Club Footballer of the Year Award: 2003
- Most Serie A titles won by a player: 10 (all with Juventus)
- Third-most consecutive Serie A titles: 7, alongside Stephan Lichtsteiner and Claudio Marchisio, behind Andrea Barzagli, 8 and Giorgio Chiellini, 9
- Joint-most Supercoppa Italiana titles: 6 (1 with Parma and 5 with Juventus), alongside Dejan Stanković
- Joint-most Coppa Italia titles: 6 (1 with Parma and 5 with Juventus), alongside Roberto Mancini
- Most Serie A Goalkeeper of the Year awards: 13
- Joint-most IFFHS World's Best Goalkeeper Awards: 5, alongside Iker Casillas and Manuel Neuer
- Most Top 2 IFFHS World's Best Goalkeeper Awards: 11 (first place 5 times and second place 6 times)
- Most Top 3 IFFHS World's Best Goalkeeper Awards: 14 (first place 5 times, second place 6 times and third place 3 times)
- Most Pallone Azzurro Awards: 2
- Fourth-most expensive goalkeeper of all time: €52 million, behind Kepa Arrizabalaga, €80 million, Alisson, €72.5 million and André Onana, €52.5 million
- Most titles won with Juventus: 21
- Second-oldest player to appear in Serie A: 43 years, 104 days, behind Marco Ballotta, 44 years, 38 days
- Second-oldest goalkeeper to appear in the UEFA Champions League: 42 years, 315 days, behind Marco Ballotta, 43 years, 252 days

Orders

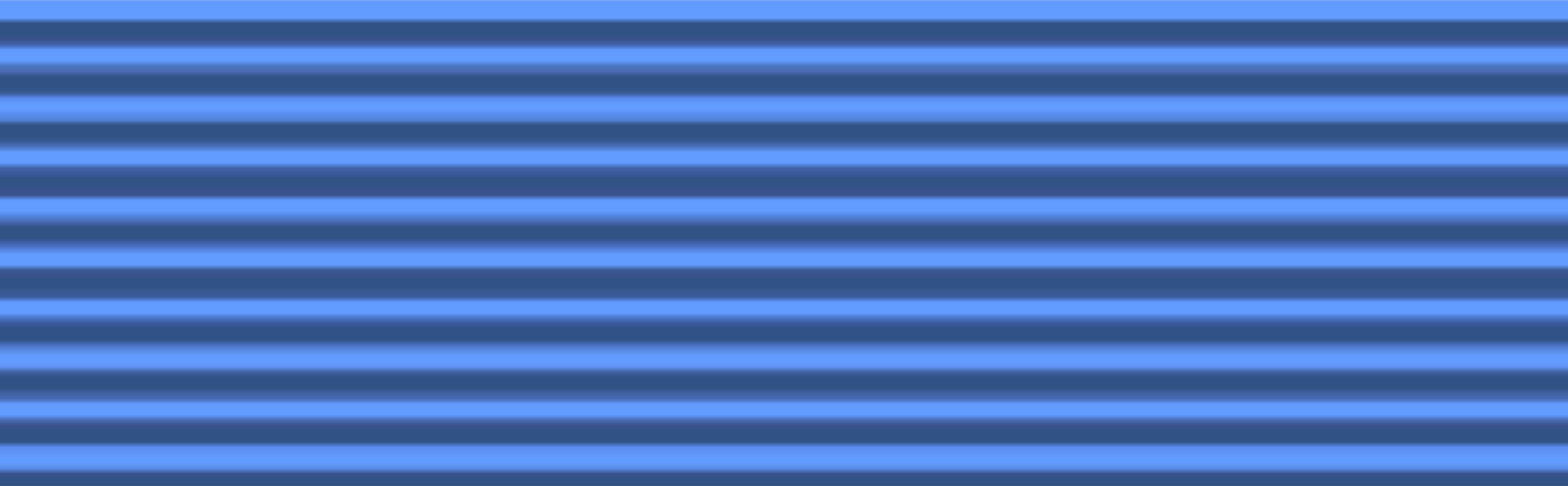
- CONI: Golden Collar of Sports Merit: 2006

- 4th Class / Officer: Ufficiale Ordine al Merito della Repubblica Italiana: 2006

== See also ==
- List of footballers with 100 or more UEFA Champions League appearances
- List of men's footballers with 100 or more international caps
- List of men's footballers with 1000 or more official appearances

== Bibliography ==
- Gianluigi Buffon, Roberto Perrone, Numero 1, Milan, Rizzoli, 2007, ISBN 978-88-17-02438-9 (Number 1). (in Italian)
- Gianluigi Buffon, Mario Desiati, Cadere, rialzarsi, cadere, rialzarsi, Milan, Mondadori, 2024, ISBN 978-88-04-79103-4 (To fall, get back up again, fall, get back up again). (in Italian)
