= Katsaridaphobia =

Specific phobia towards cockroaches

- Other names: Cockroach phobia (Note: The term Cockroach phobia is used in medical literature, studies, and by therapists.)
- Artwork depicting the Madagascar hissing cockroach
- Pronunciation: /kætˌsærɪdəˈfəʊbiə/ Cats-aə-RID-uh-FOH-bee-ə
- Specialty: Psychology
- Symptoms: Anxiety, distress, nausea, panic attacks, shortness of breath, trembling. (Note: Physical symptoms)
- Causes: Environmental factors
- Risk factors: Learnt behaviors, Family history
- Treatment: Exposure therapy, virtual reality therapy, or augmented reality

Katsaridaphobia is a specific phobia characterized by an abnormal or irrational fear of cockroaches. The phobia triggers severe panic, physical distress, and avoidance behaviors far beyond normal disgust.

If a cockroach is present near a katsaridaphobe, they may feel uneasy around the cockroach and experience difficulty breathing, rapid heart rate, panic attacks, anxiety and disgust due to its greasy, oily body and the look of the insect. In some cases, anything that resembles the look of a cockroach like a cockroach toy, different insect species that look like a cockroach, or an object that resembles a cockroach can trigger the person's katsaridaphobia since it looks like a real cockroach. Katsaridaphobes may constantly clean their homes or workplaces to avoid contact with cockroaches.

Katsaridaphobia is related to entomophobia, a broader fear of insects.

== Etymology ==
The term katsaridaphobia comes from κατσαρίδα katsarída, the Greek word for 'cockroach', and the -phobia suffix, which comes from φόβος phóbos, the Ancient Greek word for 'fear'.

== Symptoms ==
Katsaridaphobia can cause individuals to feel uncomfortable in their own homes out of fear of encountering a cockroach. Emotional distress, panic attacks, fight-or-flight, and feelings of paralysis or disgust are common responses to cockroach sightings among people with katsaridaphobia. These responses are often accompanied by physical symptoms such as nausea, dizziness, difficulty breathing, shortness of breath, and a rapid heart rate.

== Causes ==
The fear of cockroaches is often disproportionate to the actual risks they pose. These fears may originate from negative experiences during childhood, observing the behavior of one's parents, or fear of infestations. The feelings of fear and disgust evoked by cockroaches have also been attributed to physical characteristics such as their speed, greasy bodies, and odour, which is caused by uric acid stored in their bodies. Katsaridaphobia, like other specific phobias, is more common among individuals with other anxiety disorders such as panic disorder or social anxiety disorder.

== Treatment ==
=== Exposure therapy ===
Exposure therapy is one of the most widely used and effective treatments to reduce the fear of cockroaches. This may include viewing images and videos of cockroaches. Other effective treatments in exposure therapy is using actual cockroaches.

=== Virtual reality therapy ===
Virtual reality therapy is also an effective treatment to treat katsaridaphobia. The person who has katsaridaphobia will look through a VR headset, and 3D models of cockroaches can be seen through the VR headset which may be on a desk, table, or the person's hands. This reduces the fear, since they are being exposed to cockroaches on a desk which makes them have less panic attacks later on in life.

=== Augmented reality ===
Augmented reality is similar to Virtual reality therapy, but is instead seen through a computer monitor. Just like Virtual reality therapy, 3D cockroach models will be put on a desk, table, or the person's hands. This is also an effective treatment to stop katsaridaphobia.

== Studies ==
Studies have shown that images of cockroaches evoke stronger negative emotions than those of spiders or snakes.

In a 2010 study, the people in the study who remarkably, immediately after completing the Augmented reality exposure, participants who previously couldn't even touch a glass jar containing a live cockroach were able to open the jar and place their hands inside. Follow-up studies verified these clinical gains were reliably maintained 12 months later.

In a 2017 study, twenty four adults with twelve people with katsaridaphobia were studied. Those twenty four individuals were exposed to a 3D video presentation during the fMRI session. The phobic participants had a mean age of 40.08 years and showed significant hyperactivation in the amygdala, insula, and parahippocampal gyrus, areas strictly tied to emotional processing, threat assessment, and intense feelings of visceral disgust. In the study, they discovered that the katsaridaphobes brain simultaneously triggers two distinct tracks which the first one is that signals travel instantly through the thalamus straight to the amygdala, initiating a survival-driven "fight-or-flight" panic response before the conscious mind can process it. The second process of the signals loop through the sensory cortex, hippocampus, and frontal regions. This track processes memory space, and contextual horror, adding a layer of learned avoidance and deep dread.

== See also ==
- List of phobias
