= Entomophobia =

Fear of insects and bugs

Entomophobia, sometimes known as insectophobia, is a specific phobia characterized by an excessive or unrealistic fear (disgust) of one or more classes of insect, and classified as a phobia by the DSM-5. More specific cases include katsaridaphobia (fear of cockroaches), melissophobia (fear of bees), spheksophobia (fear of wasps), myrmecophobia (fear of ants), and lepidopterophobia (fear of moths and butterflies). One book claims 6% of all US inhabitants have this phobia.

Entomophobia may develop after the person has had a traumatic experience with the insect(s). It may develop early or later in life and is quite common among animal phobias. Typically, one has a fear of one specific type of insect. However, in some cases, this fear may encompass all organisms of the phylum Arthropoda. Entomophobia leads to behavioral changes: the person with entomophobia will avoid situations where they may encounter a specific type of insect. Cognitive behavioral therapy is considered an effective treatment.

== See also ==
- Zoophobia
- List of phobias
