= Fear of bees =

Specific phobia towards bees

- Other names: Apiophobia, Apiphobia, Melissophobia
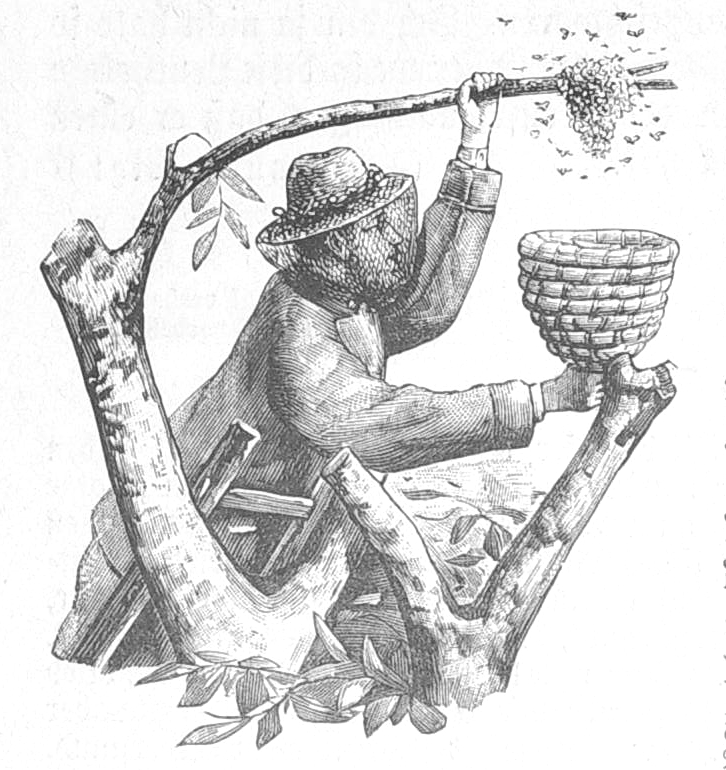
- Depiction of a beekeeper wearing protective equipment while handling bees
- Specialty: Psychiatry

The fear of bees, also known as apiophobia, apiphobia, or melissophobia, is a specific phobia triggered by the presence or apprehension of bees. It is a variation of entomophobia, a fear of insects. The phobia arises primarily from a fear of bee stings. Fear of bees often coincides with a fear of wasps, another stinging insect, and the two are sometimes conflated by people with bee phobias. A fear of bees can affect quality of life with anxiety around outdoor activities, and people with a bee phobia may experience symptoms of panic upon seeing a bee. Negative attitudes toward bees can also have negative effects on beekeeping and conservation efforts. Exposure therapy is an effective treatment for fear of bees and other specific phobias. Fear of bees may also occur in people who risk life-threatening reactions to stings, but this is considered a rational fear instead of a phobia.

== Description ==
The fear of bees is called apiophobia, apiphobia, or melissophobia. The api- prefix comes from apis, the Latin word for 'bee', and the melisso- prefix comes from μέλισσᾰ mélissa, the Greek word for 'bee' or 'honeybee'. The -phobia suffix comes from φόβος phóbos, the Ancient Greek word for 'fear'.

Bee phobias are diagnosed as animal-type specific phobia by the DSM-5, and they are related to entomophobia, a broader fear of insects. It is especially related to the fear of wasps, and the two are often comorbid. Bees are generally more well-liked than wasps by the public, in part because bees are more widely recognized as pollinators. Black-and-yellow striped bees are the most well known in public consciousness, which can cause conflation between bees and wasps. As wasps are more aggressive than bees, this conflation has a negative effect on public perception of bees.

== Causes ==
The anatomy of a bee's sting—fear of bees most commonly comes from a fear of being stung.

The fear of being stung is central to the fear of bees. Experiencing a bee sting or knowing someone who has experienced one can increase a fear of bees. Conversely, individuals who have never been stung by a bee may believe that the stings are more dangerous than they truly are. They may exaggerate the severity of a sting in their minds, with the exaggeration subsiding after experiencing a sting. Fear is also a common response to the buzzing sound of a bee.

Fear of bees brings a greater evolutionary advantage than fears of other insects because they are venomous, and can cause life-threatening harm through anaphylaxis in some individuals. As phobias are diagnoses of irrational fear, individuals who have life-threatening allergic reactions to bee stings are not considered apiphobic when experiencing a fear of bees related to their own safety. Fear of bees is less common than fear of spiders, though humans are more likely to come into contact with bees relative to other widely-feared arthropods. Bees are more easy to find accidentally when they congregate as swarms, and individual bees are attracted to food that humans may be carrying. Swarms especially can trigger panic, although bees do not typically sting while swarming.

Africanized bees, a hybrid of the western honey bee and the African honey bee, are more dangerous than other bees and are more widely feared. Relative to other bees, they are more easily provoked and will chase humans over long distances. Popular culture sensationalizes and exaggerates this danger, making fear more common. Fear of Africanized bees in the United States can play on xenophobia, as they embody the concept of a threat emerging from Africa and traveling through Latin America. Africanized bees are colloquially known as killer bees in North America and abejas bravas (transl. fierce bees) in South America.

People with a fear of bees are less likely to be knowledgeable about bees, and they frequently overestimate the likelihood of a bee becoming aggressive or stinging. People may be less likely to fear bumblebees relative to other bees, as they can be perceived as cuter and they are less likely to sting. Fearing an insect for its sting is learned behavior rather than instinctive, and bee phobias most commonly develop in childhood.

== Effects ==
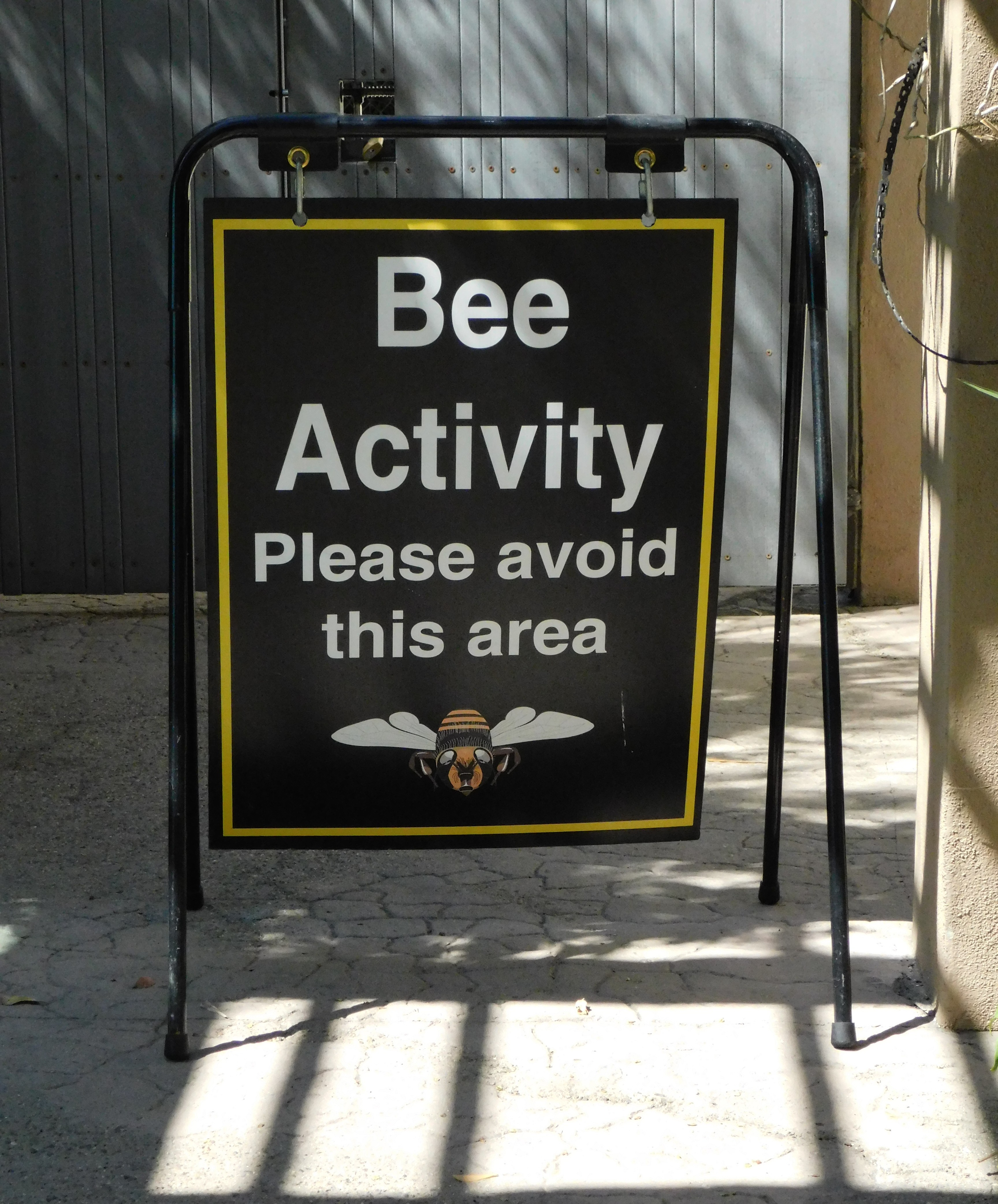
A sign warning people about the presence of bees

Fear of bees can affect a person's ability to enjoy time spent outdoors. People with a fear of bees may avoid outdoor activities, be distracted watching for bees when outdoors, or mistake other insects for bees. Emotional distress, panic attacks, and urges to flee are common responses to bee sightings for people with bee phobias, and they may attempt to kill bees upon seeing them, making it more likely that they will be stung. Since bees are attracted to flowers, the fear of flowers is most commonly associated with the fear of bees. Being a specific phobia, exposure therapy is an effective treatment for bee phobias.

Negative attitudes toward bees have a debilitating effect on conservation efforts. Fear of bees also results in legal restrictions on beekeeping, especially in urban areas. Beekeepers are often forced to reconcile a fear of being stung. They may consider it to be a routine part of the job, derive self-confidence from the nature of their work, or consider it a form of affective labor. Companies that sell honey have to take aversion to bees in consideration when marketing honey products, often avoiding the mention of bees in favor of other imagery.

The fear of bees has been observed in African elephants, and beehives have been proposed as a form of deterrent to prevent elephants from damaging vulnerable trees.

== In society ==
In African folklore, swarms of bees are seen as punishments sent by an enemy with the assistance of a witch doctor. A swarm of bees approaching one's home can alternatively be seen as a good omen or a bad omen. The Ancient Chinese similarly knew feng (bees and wasps) for their stings and considered them bad omens. After the advent of beekeeping, this view was replaced with one of bees as an example for nobility and Confucianism. The Breton, Cornish, and Welsh words for bee (gwenanenn, gwenenen, and gwenyen, respectively) refer to its sting.

News coverage of bees is mixed; while it has raised the issue of declining bee populations and promoted conservation, it also instills fear by describing deaths relating to bee stings. The spread of Africanized bees to the United States caused a panic in the country beginning in the late 1970s. This fear was exploited in the horror film The Swarm.

== See also ==
- List of phobias
