= Fear of wasps =

Specific phobia towards wasps

- Other names: Spheksophobia
- Drawing depicting a Wasp nest and Wasps
- Specialty: Psychiatry

The fear of wasps (or wasp stings), technically known as spheksophobia, is a relatively common type of specific phobia. It is similar to fear of bees (which is often called apiphobia or melissophobia). Both are types of entomophobia, which is itself a category of zoophobia.

Spheksophobies will have a hatred for wasps due to a wasps ability to use its stinger and inject venom and is unpredictable where a wasp will fly to.

== See also ==
- List of phobias
