= 1971–72 US Catanzaro season =

US Catanzaro
- President: Nicola Ceravolo
- Manager: Gianni Seghedoni
- Stadium: Stadio Comunale
- Serie A: 15th
- Coppa Italia: First Round
- Anglo-Italian Cup: First Round
- Top goalscorer: League: Alberto Spelta (7 goals); All: Alberto Spelta (10 goals)
- Highest home attendance: 24,355 vs Juventus (30 January 1972)
- Lowest home attendance: 8,860 vs LR Vicenza (28 November 1972)
- Average home league attendance: 14,470
- Biggest win: 1–0 vs Juventus (H) vs Sampdoria (H) vs Bologna (H)
- Biggest defeat: 0–4 vs Roma (A)

The 1971–72 Unione Sportiva Catanzaro season was the club's 38th season since its establishment and the club's first ever season in Serie A. In addition to its domestic league participation, Catanzaro competed in the Coppa Italia and the international competition, the Anglo-Italian Cup.

== Summary ==
Following on from his efforts to gain promotion (via the playoffs) from Serie B the previous year, Gianni Seghedoni was given the helm for the Catanzaro's inaugural season in Serie A.

The season began with 1971–72 Coppa Italia, where Catanzaro was placed in Group C with Napoli, Hellas Verona, Sorrento and Palermo. With two wins, one draw and one loss, Catanzaro finished second in the group behind Napoli and did not progress any further in the competition.

Catanzaro's first match in the Serie A was away to heavyweights, Juventus in Turin. After trailing 3–0, Alberto Spelta became the club's first Serie A goalscorer, scoring in the 75th minute. Another late consolation was scored by Maurizio Gori to end the match 4–2 to Juventus in front of 47,269 spectators. The clubs second match was against another football giant, Inter Milan this time at home at the Stadio Comunale. After going into half-time at 0–0, Inter scored two goals in the second half to give Catanzaro its second defeat of the season.

Catanzaro then earned its first point in the Serie A with an away draw at Stadio Sant'Elia to Cagliari. They then drew the next four matches before going a three-game losing streak.

Catanzaro's first win would finally come in the round 16 fixture against Juventus. Playing in Catanzaro, Angelo Mammì's 84th-minute goal would break the deadlock sealing the momentous victory 1–0. Catanzaro would only record two more victories throughout the rest of the season, with wins against Sampdoria (1–0) and Bologna (also 1–0). The club's final season match ended in a 1–0 away loss to AC Milan.

Catanzaro finished fifteenth on league ladder after the regular season and were subsequently relegated back to Serie B for the following season.

Catanzaro was selected to compete at the end of year Anglo-Italian Cup. This would be the club's first participation in international competition since the 1960 Cup of the Alps. For this tournament, teams were placed into groups with two teams from England and two from Italy. Matches would only be played against teams from the opposing country and then all teams were ranked by country. Catanzaro was grouped with English sides Stoke City and Carlisle United. Unfortunately, Catanzaro lost all four of its fixtures, and was ranked last among the Italian sides. The other Italian side in their group, Roma, finished first and went on to win the final against Blackpool.

== Squad ==
Note: Flags indicate national team as defined under FIFA eligibility rules; some limited exceptions apply. Players may hold more than one non-FIFA nationality.

Pos.	Nation	Player
GK	ITA	Luciano Bertoni
GK	ITA	Flavio Pozzani
DF	ITA	Michele Benedetto
DF	ITA	Giampiero D'Anguilli
DF	ITA	Luigi Maldera
DF	ITA	Franco Pavoni
DF	ITA	Fausto Silipo
MF	ITA	Adriano Banelli
MF	ITA	Paolo Bassi
MF	ITA	Auturo Bertuccioli

Pos.	Nation	Player
MF	ITA	Paolo Braca
MF	ITA	Roberto Franzon
MF	ITA	Sergio Zuccheri
FW	ITA	Pierluigi Busatta
FW	ITA	Angelo Carella
FW	ITA	Alfredo Ciannameo
FW	ITA	Maurizio Gori
FW	ITA	Angelo Mammì
FW	ITA	Alberto Spelta

== Competitions ==
=== Overall record ===
Competition	First match	Last match	Starting round	Final position	Record							
Competition	First match	Last match	Starting round	Final position	Pld	W	D	L	GF	GA	GD	Win %
Serie A	3 October 1971	28 May 1972	Matchday 1	15th	30	3	15	12	17	34	−17	10.00
Coppa Italia	29 August 1971	19 September 1971	Group Stage	Group Stage (2nd)	4	2	1	1	3	2	+1	50.00
Anglo-Italian Cup	1 June 1972	10 June 1972	Group Stage	Group Stage (6th)	4	0	0	4	1	10	−9	0.00
Total					38	5	16	17	21	46	−25	13.16

Source: worldfootball.net, historical lineups and rsssf.org

=== Serie A ===
==== League table ====
Pos	Team	Pld	W	D	L	GF	GA	GD	Pts	Qualification or relegation
12	Vicenza	30	8	7	15	30	43	−13	23	
13	Hellas Verona	30	4	14	12	21	36	−15	22	
14	Mantova (R)	30	6	9	15	23	39	−16	21	Relegation to Serie B
15	Catanzaro (R)	30	3	15	12	17	34	−17	21	Relegation to Serie B
16	Varese (R)	30	1	11	18	17	42	−25	13	Relegation to Serie B

Source: Panini
(R) Relegated

==== Results summary ====
Overall								Home						Away					
Pld	W	D	L	GF	GA	GD	Pts	W	D	L	GF	GA	GD	W	D	L	GF	GA	GD
30	3	15	12	17	34	−17	21	3	9	3	11	14	−3	0	6	9	6	20	−14

Last updated: Complete.
Source: worldfootball.net

Note: Wins were only worth 2 points this season

==== Results by round ====
Round	1	2	3	4	5	6	7	8	9	10	11	12	13	14	15	16	17	18	19	20	21	22	23	24	25	26	27	28	29	30
Ground	A	H	A	A	H	A	H	H	A	A	H	A	H	A	H	H	A	H	H	A	H	A	A	H	H	A	H	A	H	A
Result	L	L	D	D	D	D	D	L	L	L	D	L	D	D	D	W	L	D	W	D	D	L	L	L	D	D	W	L	D	L
Points	0	0	1	2	3	4	5	5	5	5	6	6	7	8	9	11	11	12	14	15	16	16	16	16	17	18	20	20	21	21
Position	14	16	15	13	14	14	13	15	15	15	15	15	15	14	14	13	13	14	12	12	13	13	14	14	14	14	13	14	14	15

Source: WorldFootball.net
A = Away; H = Home; W = Win; D = Draw; L = Loss; = Qualification to European Cup; = Qualification to European Cup Winner's Cup; = Qualification to UEFA Cup; = Relegation to Serie B

==== Matches ====
3 October 1971 1	Juventus	4–2	Catanzaro	Turin
	Anastasi 34'; Haller 64'; Bettega 66', 76'		Spelta 75'; Gori 79'	Stadium: Stadio Olimpico Grande Torino; Attendance: 47,269; Referee: Cesare Trinchieri

17 October 1971 2	Catanzaro	0–2	Inter Milan	Catanzaro
			Bedin 63'; Facchetti 80'	Stadium: Stadio Comunale; Attendance: 16,377; Referee: Fabio Monti

24 October 1971 3	Cagliari	0–0	Catanzaro	Cagliari
				Stadium: Stadio Amsicora; Attendance: 27,014; Referee: Fernando Lazzaroni

31 October 1971 4	Sampdoria	1–1	Catanzaro	Genoa
	Spadetto 34'		Mammi 54'	Stadium: Stadio Luigi Ferraris; Attendance: 18,839; Referee: Renzo Torelli

7 November 1971 5	Catanzaro	1–1	Varese	Catanzaro
	Banelli 37'		Petrini 83'	Stadium: Stadio Comunale; Attendance: 14,580; Referee: Sergio Gonella

14 November 1971 6	Mantova	1–1	Catanzaro	Mantua
	Maddè 59'		Spelta 84'	Stadium: Stadio Danilo Martelli; Attendance: 9,715; Referee: Giulio Ciacci

28 November 1971 7	Catanzaro	1–1	Vicenza	Catanzaro
	Spelta 14'		Damiani 66'	Stadium: Stadio Comunale; Attendance: 8,860; Referee: Mario Bernardis

5 December 1971 8	Catanzaro	0–2	Fiorentina	Catanzaro
			Chiarugi 53' (pen.); Clerici 79'	Stadium: Stadio Comunale; Attendance: 12,210; Referee: Alberto Michelotti

12 December 1971 9	Torino	1–0	Catanzaro	Turin
	Agroppi 22'			Stadium: Stadio Olimpico Grande Torino; Attendance: 25,875; Referee: Umberto Branzoni

19 December 1971 10	Atalanta	1–0	Catanzaro	Bergamo
	Magistrelli 6'			Stadium: Stadio Comunale; Attendance: 15,153; Referee: Enzo Barbaresco

26 December 1971 11	Catanzaro	0–0	Napoli	Catanzaro
				Stadium: Stadio Comunale; Attendance: 13,708; Referee: Ezio Motta

2 January 1972 12	Bologna	2–1	Catanzaro	Bologna
	Savoldi 2', 29'		Busatta 77'	Stadium: Stadio Comunale; Attendance: 18,396; Referee: Ettore Carminati

9 January 1972 13	Catanzaro	1–1	Roma	Catanzaro
	Mammi 59'		Zigoni 23'	Stadium: Stadio Comunale; Attendance: 11,449; Referee: Cesare Gussoni

16 January 1972 14	Hellas Verona	0–0	Catanzaro	Verona
				Stadium: Stadio Marcantonio Bentegodi; Attendance: 12,828; Referee: Concetto Lo Bello

23 January 1972 15	Catanzaro	0–0	Milan	Catanzaro
				Stadium: Stadio Comunale; Attendance: 16,377; Referee: Aurelio Angonese

30 January 1972 16	Catanzaro	1–0	Juventus	Catanzaro
	Mammi 84'			Stadium: Stadio Comunale; Attendance: 25,355; Referee: Paolo Toselli

6 February 1972 17	Inter Milan	1–0	Catanzaro	Milan
	Mazzola 47'			Stadium: Stadio Giuseppe Meazza; Attendance: 43,109; Referee: Luciano Giunti

13 February 1972 18	Catanzaro	2–2	Cagliari	Catanzaro
	Spelta 66', 90' (pen.)		Brugnera 65'; Nené 71'	Stadium: Stadio Comunale; Attendance: 15,984; Referee: Concetto Lo Bello

20 February 1972 19	Catanzaro	1–0	Sampdoria	Catanzaro
	Banelli 35'			Stadium: Stadio Comunale; Attendance: 12,422; Referee: Sergio Gonella

27 February 1972 20	Varese	1–1	Catanzaro	Verona
	Braida 18'		Spelta 86' (pen.)	Stadium: Stadio Franco Ossola; Attendance: 12,828; Referee: Riccardo Lattanzi

12 March 1972 21	Catanzaro	1–1	Mantova	Catanzaro
	Spelta 6'		Petrini 60'	Stadium: Stadio Comunale; Attendance: 11,445; Referee: Mario Bernardis

19 March 1972 22	Vicenza	2–0	Catanzaro	Vicenza
	Maraschi 23', 52'			Stadium: Stadio Romeo Menti; Attendance: 12,811; Referee: Gianfranco Menegali

26 March 1972 23	Fiorentina	1–0	Catanzaro	Florence
	Clerici 80' (pen.)			Stadium: Stadio Comunale; Attendance: 43,109; Referee: Paolo Toselli

2 April 1972 24	Catanzaro	1–3	Torino	Catanzaro
	Gori 47'		Sala 11'; Banelli 25' (o.g.); Bui 56'	Stadium: Stadio Comunale; Attendance: 14,205; Referee: Mario Bernardis

9 April 1972 25	Catanzaro	1–1	Atalanta	Catanzaro
	Busatta 4'		Zuccheri 56' (o.g.)	Stadium: Stadio Comunale; Attendance: 10,285; Referee: Riccardo Lattanzi

16 April 1972 26	Napoli	0–0	Catanzaro	Verona
				Stadium: Stadio San Paolo; Attendance: 42,789; Referee: Luciano Giunti

23 April 1972 27	Catanzaro	1–0	Bologna	Catanzaro
	Banelli 70'			Stadium: Stadio Comunale; Attendance: 13,054; Referee: Sergio Gonella

7 May 1972 28	Roma	4–0	Catanzaro	Roma
	Zigoni 53'; Scaratti 59'; Franzot 61'; Benedetto 70' (o.g.)			Stadium: Stadio Olimpico; Attendance: 44,930; Referee: Renzo Torelli

21 May 1972 29	Catanzaro	0–0	Hellas Verona	Catanzaro
				Stadium: Stadio Comunale; Attendance: 17,961; Referee: Sergio Gonella

28 May 1972 30	Milan	1–0	Catanzaro	Milan
	Bigon 23'			Stadium: Stadio San Siro; Attendance: 44,281; Referee: Fulvio Pieroni

=== Coppa Italia ===
==== First Round (Group C) table ====
Pos	Team	Pld	W	D	L	GF	GA	GD	Pts
1	Napoli	4	3	0	1	4	2	+2	6
2	Catanzaro	4	2	1	1	3	2	+1	5
3	Hellas Verona	4	1	2	1	6	3	+3	4
4	Sorrento	4	2	0	2	3	6	−3	4
5	Palermo	4	0	1	3	1	4	−3	1

==== Matches ====
29 August 1971 Matchday 1	Hellas Verona	1–1	Catanzaro	Verona
	Mazzanti 24'		Spelta 18'	Referee: Renzo Torelli

5 September 1971 Matchday 2	Catanzaro	0–1	Napoli	Cosenza
			Improta 85'	Referee: Gialluisi

12 September 1971 Matchday 4	Palermo	0–1	Catanzaro	Palermo
			Spelta 63'	Referee: Alberto Michelotti

19 September 1971 Matchday 5	Catanzaro	1–0	Sorrento	Cosenza
	Spelta 45' (pen.)			Referee: Gialluisi

=== Anglo-Italian Cup ===
==== Group 1 ====
1 June 1972 Matchday 1	Catanzaro	0–3	(England) Stoke City	Catanzaro
			Greenhoff 60'; Dobing 66'; Marsh 75'	Stadium: Stadio Comunale; Attendance: 14,147; Referee: Bob Matthewson

4 June 1972 Matchday 2	Catanzaro	0–1	(England) Carlisle United	Catanzaro
			Bowles 63'	Stadium: Stadio Comunale; Referee: John Yates

7 June 1972 Matchday 3	(England) Stoke City	2–0	Catanzaro	Stoke-on-Trent
	Ritchie 43'; Greenhoff 90'			Stadium: Victoria Ground; Attendance: 8,345; Referee: Mario Bernardis

10 June 1972 Matchday 4	(England) Carlisle United	4–1	Catanzaro	Carlisle
	Martin 7'; Bowles 42', 37'; Barton 81'		D'Angiulli	Stadium: Brunton Park; Referee: Cesare Gussoni

== Statistics ==
=== Appearances and goals ===
No.	Pos	Nat	Player	Total		Serie A		Coppa Italia	
No.	Pos	Nat	Player	Apps	Goals	Apps	Goals	Apps	Goals
Goalkeepers
	GK	(Italy) ITA	Flavio Pozzani	19	0	16	0	3	0
	GK	(Italy) ITA	Luciano Bertoni	15	0	14	0	1	0
Defenders
	DF	(Italy) ITA	Giampiero D'Angiulli	32	0	28	0	4	0
	DF	(Italy) ITA	Luigi Maldera	23	0	22+1	0	0	0
	DF	(Italy) ITA	Franco Pavoni	23	0	22+1	0	0	0
	DF	(Italy) ITA	Michele Benedetto	20	0	16	0	4	0
	DF	(Italy) ITA	Fausto Silipo	18	0	12+2	0	4	0
Midfielders
	MF	(Italy) ITA	Adriano Banelli	33	3	28+2	3	3	0
	MF	(Italy) ITA	Roberto Franzon	27	0	23	0	4	0
	MF	(Italy) ITA	Sergio Zuccheri	27	0	20+3	0	4	0
	MF	(Italy) ITA	Paulo Braca	22	0	18+1	0	2+1	0
	MF	(Italy) ITA	Auturo Bertuccioli	8	0	5+3	0	0	0
	MF	(Italy) ITA	Paolo Bassi	3	0	3	0	0	0
	MF	(Italy) ITA	Meravigilia	1	0	0	0	1	0
	MF	(Italy) ITA	Bisurgi	2	0	0	0	0+2	0
Forwards
	FW	(Italy) ITA	Alberto Spelta	34	10	30	7	4	3
	FW	(Italy) ITA	Pierlugi Busatta	31	2	27	2	4	0
	FW	(Italy) ITA	Angelo Mammi	26	3	21+2	3	2+1	0
	FW	(Italy) ITA	Maurizio Gori	29	2	20+5	2	3+1	0
	FW	(Italy) ITA	Angelo Carella	6	0	4+2	0	0	0
	FW	(Italy) ITA	Alfredo Ciannameo	7	1	1+5	1	0+1	0
	FW	(Italy) ITA	Seghezza	2	0	0	0	1+1	0
