= Stoke City F.C. in European football =

English club in European football

- Club: Stoke City
- Seasons played: 3
- Most appearances: Robert Huth (10); Kenwyne Jones (10); Ryan Shotton (10); Jonathan Walters (10); Dean Whitehead (10)
- Top scorer: Kenwyne Jones (4)
- First entry: 1972–73 UEFA Cup
- Latest entry: 2011–12 UEFA Europa League

Stoke City Football Club is an English football club based in Stoke-on-Trent, Staffordshire. The club was founded in 1863 and has competed in the English football league system since 1888. They played in the UEFA Cup in 1972–73 and 1974–75, before qualifying for the tournament in 2011–12 under the new name of UEFA Europa League. The club also entered the Anglo-Italian Cup and the Texaco Cup.

== History ==
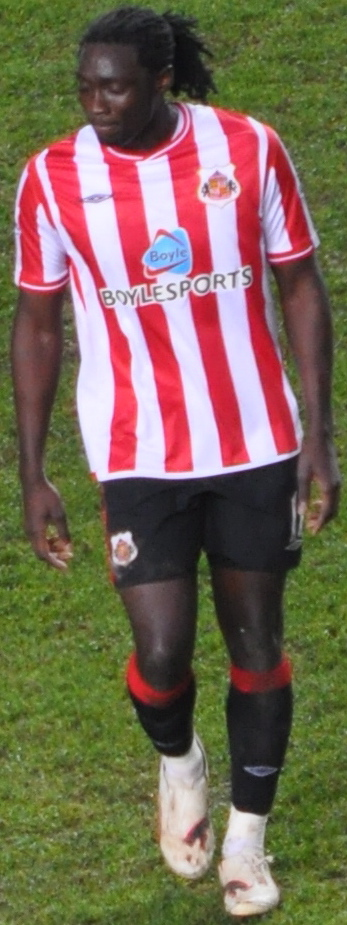
Kenwyne Jones scored four goals, making him Stoke's top European goalscorer.

=== 1972–73 UEFA Cup ===
Stoke City, under manager Tony Waddington, won the Football League Cup in 1971–72, beating Chelsea in the Final. This saw them awarded a place in the UEFA Cup, alongside Liverpool, Manchester City and Tottenham Hotspur.

The Potters faced 1. FC Kaiserslautern in the first round. In the home leg at the Victoria Ground, Terry Conroy became the first Stoke goalscorer in major European competition. Geoff Hurst doubled their lead, before Idriz Hošić scored for the visitors; John Ritchie's late goal restored City's two-goal advantage. However, the away leg was disastrous for Stoke: substitute Lothar Huber opened the scoring a minute after coming onto the pitch, with Jürgen Friedrich and Hermann Bitz also scoring before City's sub Ritchie made a swift impact of his own by getting a red card almost immediately after entering the pitch. The West Germans were not finished yet, though, as Hošić added another to complete a 4–0 loss (5–3 on aggregate), sending Stoke out.

Season	Competition	Round	Opposition	Home	Attendance	Away	Attendance	Aggregate
1972–73	UEFA Cup	First round	(West Germany) Kaiserslauten	3–1	22,182	0–4	9,153	3–5

=== 1974–75 UEFA Cup ===
Waddington delivered European football to Stoke again by finishing fifth in the 1973–74 season. This saw them awarded a place in the UEFA Cup, alongside fellow English clubs Derby County, Ipswich Town and Wolverhampton Wanderers.

Stoke's first opposition were Dutch club Ajax, who less than two years beforehand had won the right to retain the European Champion Clubs' Cup, and were now making their début UEFA Cup appearance. The home leg finished 1–1: Ruud Krol broke the deadlock in the 27th minute before Denis Smith equalised. A goalless away leg in Amsterdam resulted in the elimination of the English club, by operation of the away goals rule.

Stoke's finish of fifth the following season was initially rewarded with another UEFA Cup berth. However, the existing "one team per city" rule (a hangover from the Inter-Cities Fairs Cup days) was scrapped in 1975, allowing Everton in fourth to take up their place.

Season	Competition	Round	Opposition	Home	Attendance	Away	Attendance	Aggregate
1974–75	UEFA Cup	First round	(Netherlands) Ajax	1–1	37,145	0–0	19,020	1–1(a)

=== 2011–12 UEFA Europa League ===
Stoke City, under manager Tony Pulis, were beaten finalists in the 2011 FA Cup Final, losing to Manchester City. This saw them awarded a place in the UEFA Europa League, which featured five other English clubs: Birmingham City, Fulham, Tottenham Hotspur and Manchester clubs City and United.

After defeating Hajduk Split and FC Thun in the qualifying rounds, Stoke reached the group stage, and were drawn into Group E, to face Dynamo Kyiv, Beşiktaş and Maccabi Tel Aviv. A record of three wins, two draws and one loss led to Stoke finishing second in the group behind the Turkish club, and going through to face Valencia, who eliminated the Potters with two one-nil victories, in each leg.

Season	Competition	Round	Opposition	Home	Attendance	Away	Attendance	Aggregate
2011–12	UEFA Europa League	Third qualifying round	(Croatia) Hajduk Split	1–0	26,322	1–0	33,000	2–0
2011–12	UEFA Europa League	Play-off round	(Switzerland) FC Thun	4–1	24,118	1–0	7,150	5–1
2011–12	UEFA Europa League	Group E	(Ukraine) Dynamo Kyiv	1–1	23,774	1–1	14,500	2nd
2011–12	UEFA Europa League	Group E	(Turkey) Beşiktaş	2–1	23,551	1–3	26,118	2nd
2011–12	UEFA Europa League	Group E	(Israel) Maccabi Tel Aviv	3–0	22,756	2–1	10,368	2nd
2011–12	UEFA Europa League	Round of 32	(Spain) Valencia	0–1	24,185	0–1	36,535	0–2

== Overall record in all UEFA competitions ==
=== Record by competition ===
Competition	Pld	W	D	L	GF	GA	GD	Best performance
UEFA Cup / UEFA Europa League	16	8	4	4	21	16	+5	Round of 32 (2011–12)

=== Record by nation ===
Nation	Pld	W	D	L	GF	GA	GD	Opponents
Croatia	2	2	0	0	2	0	+2	Hajduk Split
Germany (Note: Including West Germany)	2	1	0	1	3	5	-2	Kaiserslauten
Israel	2	2	0	0	5	1	+4	Maccabi Tel Aviv
Netherlands	2	0	2	0	1	1	0	Ajax
Spain	2	0	0	2	0	2	-2	Valencia
Switzerland	2	2	0	0	5	1	+4	FC Thun
Turkey	2	1	0	1	3	4	-1	Beşiktaş
Ukraine	2	0	2	0	2	2	0	Dynamo Kyiv

== Non-UEFA competitions ==
=== 1970–71 Texaco Cup ===
Stoke entered the inaugural Texaco Cup, in 1970–71. Their first opponents were Motherwell. The Scottish club won the first leg 1–0, with the Glasgow Herald praising goalkeeper Gordon Banks' performance as "incredible". At home, Stoke won 2–1, levelling the score on aggregate; Motherwell won in the subsequent penalty shoot-out after there was no winner in extra time.

Season	Competition	Round	Opposition	Score
1970–71	Texaco Cup	First round	(Scotland) Motherwell	0–1 (A), 2–1 (H) (Note: Lost 4–3 on penalties)

=== 1971 Anglo-Italian Cup ===
Stoke's first appearance in the Anglo-Italian Cup came in 1971. For the group stage, Stoke were placed in Group 3, with Blackpool, Hellas Verona and A.S. Roma. Each club would face the clubs from the other country in their group home and away, and the English and Italian club with the best record in the tournament out of the three groups would play each other in the Final. City finished third in the English table.

Season	Competition	Round	Opposition	Score
1971	Anglo-Italian Cup	Group stage	(Italy) A.S. Roma	2–2 (H)
1971	Anglo-Italian Cup	Group stage	(Italy) Hellas Verona	2–0 (H)
1971	Anglo-Italian Cup	Group stage	(Italy) A.S. Roma	0–1 (A)
1971	Anglo-Italian Cup	Group stage	(Italy) Hellas Verona	2–1 (A)

=== 1971–72 Texaco Cup ===
Stoke entered the Texaco Cup again in 1971–72. Again, Motherwell were Stoke's first round opponents, but this time Stoke beat them home and away to progress to the second round, where Derby County awaited. Derby won the leg at the Baseball Ground 3–2 and Stoke could only muster a 1–1 draw at home, leading to Derby winning 4–3 on aggregate. Derby went on to win the competition.

Season	Competition	Round	Opposition	Score
1971–72	Texaco Cup	First round	(Scotland) Motherwell	0–1 (A), 4–1 (H)
1971–72	Texaco Cup	Second round	(England) Derby County	3–2 (A), 1–1 (H)

=== 1972 Anglo-Italian Cup ===
Stoke returned to the Anglo-Italian Cup for the 1972 tournament. City were part of a six-strong English contingent made up of themselves, Birmingham City, Carlisle United, Leicester City, Sunderland and reigning champions Blackpool. The Potters beat Catanzaro home and away however lost both matches against Roma, resulting in Stoke finishing dead last. Due to lack of interest the tournament ceased after the 1973 edition.

Season	Competition	Round	Opposition	Score
1972	Anglo-Italian Cup	Group stage	(Italy) Catanzaro	0–3 (A)
1972	Anglo-Italian Cup	Group stage	(Italy) A.S. Roma	2–0 (A)
1972	Anglo-Italian Cup	Group stage	(Italy) Catanzaro	2–0 (H)
1972	Anglo-Italian Cup	Group stage	(Italy) A.S. Roma	1–2 (H)

=== 1973–74 Texaco Cup ===
Returning for a third Texaco Cup tournament, Stoke were again eliminated early. This time, their elimination would come at the hands of Birmingham City, who won the penalty shoot-out after both legs finished goalless. This was Stoke's last entry to the Texaco Cup. Texaco withdrew their sponsorship after the 1974–75 tournament, which continued as the Anglo-Scottish Cup, which Stoke elected not to enter.

Season	Competition	Round	Opposition	Score
1973–74	Texaco Cup	First round	(England) Birmingham City	0–0 (H), 0–0 (A) (Note: Lost 5–4 on penalties)

=== 1993–94 Anglo-Italian Cup ===
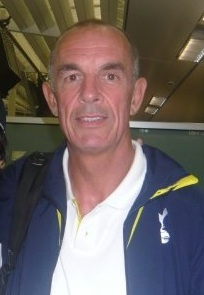
Joe Jordan's (2009 image) first match as Stoke manager was against Fiorentina in the Anglo-Italian Cup.

Stoke's first entry to the Anglo-Italian Cup since the revival of the competition in 1992 came in the 1993–94 season. In the preliminary round, they were placed in Group 5 with Birmingham City and Wolverhampton Wanderers. A 3–3 draw at Wolves and a 2–0 win over Birmingham saw the Potters progress to the group stage.

In the group stage, Stoke were in Group 2, with English teams Portsmouth, Southend United, and West Bromwich Albion and Italian clubs Cosenza, Fiorentina, Padova and Pescara. City's first match was a 2–1 win over Cosenza on 12 October 1993. In the first match of Joe Jordan's tenure as manager, Stoke played out a goalless draw with a Fiorentina side featuring internationalists Stefan Effenberg and Gabriel Batistuta on 10 November 1993. However, defeats at Padova and Pescara derailed Stoke's campaign as they finished sixth in the group, out of eight.

Season	Competition	Round	Opposition	Score
1993–94	Anglo-Italian Cup	Preliminary round	(England) Wolverhampton Wanderers	3–3 (A)
1993–94	Anglo-Italian Cup	Preliminary round	(England) Birmingham City	2–0 (H)
1993–94	Anglo-Italian Cup	Group stage	(Italy) Cosenza	2–1 (H)
1993–94	Anglo-Italian Cup	Group stage	(Italy) Fiorentina	0–0 (H)
1993–94	Anglo-Italian Cup	Group stage	(Italy) Padova	3–0 (A)
1993–94	Anglo-Italian Cup	Group stage	(Italy) Pescara	2–1 (A)

=== 1994–95 Anglo-Italian Cup ===
In the 1994–95 tournament, City were put into Group B, with English clubs Derby County, Middlesbrough and Sheffield United, and Italian teams Ancona, Cesena, Piacenza and Udinese. Jordan began the season in charge, and was in the dugout for the first two group stage matches before resigning on 8 September 1994, he was replaced by Lou Macari on 29 September 1994, in time for Stoke's trip to Udinese. Macari was the man at the Victoria Ground helm before Jordan's appointment. Stoke registered three wins out of four - a 1–1 draw against Ancona the only points dropped - and topped their group. This resulted in progression to the English final, where Notts County - Group A winners and finalists the previous season - awaited. Both legs finished goalless, and County won in the subsequent penalty shoot-out. They also won in the final at Wembley Stadium, beating Ascoli 2–1.

Season	Competition	Round	Opposition	Score
1994–95	Anglo-Italian Cup	Group stage	(Italy) Cesena	0–2 (A)
1994–95	Anglo-Italian Cup	Group stage	(Italy) Ancona	1–1 (H)
1994–95	Anglo-Italian Cup	Group stage	(Italy) Udinese	1–3 (A)
1994–95	Anglo-Italian Cup	Group stage	(Italy) Piacenza	4–0 (H)
1994–95	Anglo-Italian Cup	English final	(England) Notts County	0–0 (H), 0–0 (A) (Note: Lost 3–2 on penalties)

=== 1995–96 Anglo-Italian Cup ===
In the 1995–96 Anglo-Italian Cup, the Potters were put into Group B, with English clubs Ipswich Town, Southend United, and West Bromwich Albion and Italian teams Brescia, Foggia, Reggiana and Salernitana. Stoke drew all four matches, finishing fifth. The tournament itself was scrapped after this tournament because the two leagues could not agree on dates for fixtures, and due to increasing violence at matches.

Season	Competition	Round	Opposition	Score
1995–96	Anglo-Italian Cup	Group stage	(Italy) Foggia	1–1 (A)
1995–96	Anglo-Italian Cup	Group stage	(Italy) Salernitana	2–2 (H)
1995–96	Anglo-Italian Cup	Group stage	(Italy) Brescia	1–1 (H)
1995–96	Anglo-Italian Cup	Group stage	(Italy) Reggiana	0–0 (A)
