= List of people from the Metropolitan Borough of Rochdale =

This is a list of people from Rochdale, in Greater Manchester. The demonym of Rochdale is Rochdalian, however, this list may include people from Heywood, Littleborough, Middleton, Milnrow and Wardle, all from the wider Metropolitan Borough of Rochdale. This list is arranged alphabetically by surname:

Table of contents: A B C D E F G H I J K L M N O P Q R S T U V W X Y Z See also • References

== A ==
- Muhammad Abdur Rahman, (b. 2001), footballer in the premier division of the West Lancashire Football League

== B ==
- Colin Baker (b. 1943), actor known for playing Doctor Who on television
- Samuel Bamford (1788–1872), radical and writer; born in Middleton
- Lizzy Bardsley (b. c. 1973), gained fame from appearing on Channel 4's Wife Swap in 2003
- Earl Barrett (b. 1967), football coach and former footballer
- Les Barton (1920–2002), English professional footballer
- Stuart Bithell (b. 1986), Olympic Silver Medallist – Men's 470 sailing at the London 2012 summer Olympics and Olympic Gold Medalist – Men's 49er sailing at the Tokyo 2020 summer Olympics
- Nicholas Blincoe (b. 1965), author, critic and screenwriter
- Christine Bottomley (b. 1979), actress known for her roles on Early Doors, Heartbeat and as Shoo Coggan on BBC drama, Hope Springs
- Steve Brackenridge (b. 1984), football player
- John Bright (1811–1889), radical; Liberal statesman associated with Richard Cobden in the formation of the Anti-Corn Law League
- Stephen Butterworth (1885–1958), British physicist and engineer

== C ==
- Robert Chadwick (1833–1902), American politician; Pennsylvania State Representative for Delaware County from 1881 to 1888
- Mark Chapman (b. 1973), television and radio sports presenter
- Steve Clayton, Rochdale-born author and drummer in Tractor
- Brian Clegg (b. 1955), science writer; born in Rochdale
- Jake Cody (b. 1988), professional poker player, winner of the triple crown
- Monica Coghlan (1951–2001), a woman caught up in the Jeffrey Archer scandal
- John Collier (1708–1786), Urmston-born 18th-century caricaturist and satirical poet; brought up and spent all his adult life in Milnrow
- Steve Coogan (b. 1965), Middleton-born and brought up comedian
- Rev. Joseph Cooke (1775–1811), the inspiration behind the Methodist Unitarian movement.
- Jack Crabtree (b. 1938), contemporary artist; born in Rochdale
- Lisa Cross (b. 1978), IFBB professional bodybuilder

== D ==
- Craig Dawson (b. 1990), professional footballer, Rochdale, West Bromwich Albion, Bolton Wanderers, Watford and England U21
- Victoria Derbyshire (b. 1968), British journalist, newsreader and broadcaster who was born in Bury, but spent most of her childhood in Littleborough

== E ==
- Kelvin Earl (b. 1951), Littleborough-born rugby league footballer of the 1970s. He played at club level for Rochdale Hornets (two spells), St Helens, Bradford Northern and Swinton
- G. H. Elliott (1882–1962), music hall singer, dancer, and recording star
- Don Estelle (1933–2003), Crumpsall-born actor and singer who lived for much of his life in Rochdale

== F ==
- Roger Fenton (1819–1869), Heywood-born pioneering war photographer; his work on the Crimean War is particularly acclaimed; a blue plaque marks his former home
- Gracie Fields (1898–1979), real name Grace Stansfield; actress, singer and comedian
- Darrell Fitton, electronic musician from Rochdale. Most of his work is recorded under recording monikers 'Bola' and 'Jello'
- Paul Flowers (b. 1950), banker, also known as the Crystal Methodist; councillor in the town in 1988–92
- Anna Friel (b. 1976), stage and screen actress

== G ==
- Alfred Henry Gill (1856–1914), MP for Bolton, 1906–1914. In first group of 29 Labour MPs to enter Parliament
- Julie Goodyear (b. 1942), television actress and personality, best known for her portrayal of Bet Lynch in Coronation Street
- Henry M. Grey (1867–1937), travel writer

== H ==
- Trevor Hoyle (b. 1940), novelist, radio dramatist, and broadcaster

== J ==
- Anna Jacobs (b. 1941), novelist
- Sajid Javid (b. 1969), former politician who served as Home Secretary for the Conservative Government
- Barb Jungr (b. 1954), singer, songwriter and musician

== K ==
- Sir James Kay-Shuttleworth, 1st Baronet (1804–1877), politician and educationalist
- Emily Georgiana Kemp (1860–1939), adventurer, artist and writer
- Andy Kershaw (1959–2026), BBC music broadcaster
- Liz Kershaw (b. 1958), BBC music broadcaster
- Nellie Kershaw (c. 1891–1924), world's first victim of asbestosis to be recorded in medical literature
- Walter Kershaw (b. 1940), artist
- Heather Knight (b. 1990), international cricketer and former captain of the England women's cricket team

== L ==
- Jessica Lord (b. 1998), actress and dancer
- Donald Love (b. 1994), professional footballer

== M ==
- Bob Mason (1951–2004), actor and writer
- Joseph Massey (1895–1977), cricketer
- Dwight McNeil (b. 1999), footballer
- Vance Miller (b. 1965), controversial entrepreneur from Rochdale
- Jim Milne, lead guitarist and vocalist in Tractor and co founder of Tractor Sound Studios
- John Milne (1850–1913), Liverpool-born, Milnrow-brought up professor, geologist and mining engineer who invented a pioneering seismograph (known as the Milne-Shaw seismograph) to detect and measure earthquakes

== O ==
- Bill Oddie (1941-2026), naturalist, comedian, musician and actor
- Sir Peter Ogden (b. 1947), businessman and one of the founders of Computacenter

== R ==
- Francis Robert Raines (1805–1878), former Anglican vicar of Milnrow; antiquary; edited 23 volumes for the Chetham Society publications
- Alec Roth (b. 1948), composer

== S ==
- Joseph A. Sladen (1841–1911), recipient of the Medal of Honor during the American Civil War, born in Rochdale
- Cyril Smith (1928–2010), disgraced Member of Parliament
- Nik & Eva Speakman (known collectively as The Speakmans) (b. 1961 and 1969), writers, therapists, life coaches and TV presenters
- Lisa Stansfield (b. 1966), Grammy Award-nominated and BRIT Award-winning R&B and soul singer; brought up in Heywood

== T ==
- Annie Tomlinson (1870–1933), British journalist and co-operative movement supporter

== V ==
- Harry Roy Veevers (1949-2013) real estate tycoon.

== W ==
- Keira Walsh (b. 1997), footballer who plays for Chelsea and the England women's national team
- Edwin Waugh (1817–1890), poet

== See also ==
- List of people from Greater Manchester
