= List of people from the Metropolitan Borough of Stockport =

People from Stockport, in Greater Manchester, England

This is a list of people from Stockport, in North West England. The demonym of Stockport is Stopfordian; however, this list may include people from Bredbury, Cheadle, Cheadle Hulme, Marple, Reddish and Romiley, all from the wider Metropolitan Borough of Stockport. This list is arranged alphabetically by surname.

Table of contents:
A B C D E F G H I J K L M N O P Q R S T U V W X Y Z
See also • References

== A ==
- John Amaechi (born 1970), psychologist, consultant and former professional basketball player
- Nathan Aspinall (born 1991), professional darts player who competes in Professional Darts Corporation (PDC) events
- John Axon (1900–1957); engine driver, who died trying to stop a runaway freight train
- John Axon (1960–2008), television and stage actor.

== B ==
- George Back (1796–1878), British Royal Navy officer, explorer of the Canadian Arctic, naturalist and artist
- Alexander Baillie (born 1956), cellist, recognised internationally as one of the finest of his generation
- Christina Baily (born 1981), actress
- Joan Bakewell (born 1933), TV presenter, newsreader and journalist
- Peter Barkworth (1929–2006), actor; born in Margate, moved to Bramhall as a child
- Kyle Bartley (born 1991), professional footballer; born in Stockport, went to Marple Hall High School
- James Johnson Battersby (1875–1949), hat manufacturer, Battersby Hats, RMS Lusitania survivor
- Norman Beaker (born 1950), blues artist; official inductee as British Legend in Blues Hall of Fame. Born in Longsight, Manchester, he resides in Stockport
- Taylor Harwood-Bellis (born 2002), professional footballer
- Kerry Bennett, television and theatre actress
- Gillian Bevan (born 1956), television and theatre actress
- Paddy Bever (born 2002), actor, known for portraying the role of Max Turner on Coronation Street
- Melanie Blake, talent agent and author
- Lee Boardman (born 1972), actor and narrator
- Peter Boardman (1950–1982), mountaineer who died on Everest North-East Ridge; born in Bramhall; attended Stockport Grammar
- John Bradshaw (1602–1659), jurist notable for his role as President of the High Court of Justice for the trial and regicide of King Charles I
- Roger Brierley (1935–2005), TV actor
- Liam Broady (born 1994), 2010 Wimbledon Boys' Doubles champion; born in Manchester, now lives in Stockport
- Andrew Buchan (born 1979), TV and stage actor; born in Stockport and brought up in the Bolton suburb of Lostock
- Paul Burgess (born 1950), drummer notable for his association with a wide range of bands and artists such as 10cc, Jethro Tull, Camel, Magna Carta and The Icicle Works
- Peter Butterworth (1917–1978), film actor, known for appearances in Carry On films

== C ==
- Craig Cash (born 1960), comedy writer and actor, Dave in The Royle Family, born and raised in Heaton Norris
- Julia Chan, actress and presenter
- Tom Chorlton (1880–1948), professional footballer
- Nick Cohen (born 1961), journalist, author and political commentator
- James Conway (1922–1942), Royal Navy marine; born in Edgeley; shot on Cockleshell Heroes commando raid
- Ben Crompton (born 1974), actor and stand-up comedian, portrayed Eddison Tollett on Game of Thrones

== D ==
- Tess Daly (born 1969), model and television presenter, known for co-presenting the BBC One celebrity talent show Strictly Come Dancing
- Karl Davies (born 1982), film and television actor
- Sacha Dhawan (born 1984), actor, stage, film, television and radio; born in Bramhall
- David Dickinson, born David Gulessarian (born 1941), antiques expert and television presenter
- Geoff Downes (born 1952), keyboardist who gained fame as a member of the new wave group the Buggles

== E ==
- Alex Etel (born 1994), former actor known for Millions and The Water Horse
- Yasmin Evans (born 1990), radio DJ and TV presenter known for presenting on BBC Radio 1Xtra

== F ==
- Yvette Fielding (born 1968), television presenter, producer, actress, and writer
- Findlay (born 1992), real name Natalie Rose Findlay, musician
- Tibor Fischer (born 1959), novelist and short story writer nominated for the Booker prize
- Darryl Fitton (born 1962), professional darts player currently playing in British Darts Organisation events
- Anthony Flanagan (born 1972), actor, played policeman Tony in comedy-drama series Shameless.
- Phil Foden (born 2000), professional footballer who plays as a midfielder for Premier League club Manchester City
- Norman Foster (born 1935), Stockport-born architect; made Baron Foster of Thames Bank, Reddish, in 1999
- Claire Foy (born 1984), Emmy Award-winning actress, known for her role as Queen Elizabeth II in the Netflix series The Crown
- Nicholas Frankau (born 1954), actor known for the role of Lt. Carstairs in the British sitcom 'Allo 'Allo!
- Martin Fry (born 1958), lead singer of the English new wave band ABC; born in Stretford, moved to Bramhall as a child
- Hughie Fury (born 1994), professional boxer who fights at heavyweight

== G ==
- William Garbutt (1883–1964), football player and manager called "the most important man in the history of Italian football" by Vittorio Pozzo
- Sidney Gilliat (1908–1994), film director, producer and writer, The Lady Vanishes, Jamaica Inn
- James Goddard (born 1983), swimmer, grew up in Stockport

== H ==
- Louise Hampton (1879–1954), stage, film and television actress
- Sarah Harding (1981–2021), of pop girl group Girls Aloud
- Nigel Harrison (born 1951), of the American rock band Blondie during the 1970s and 1980s
- Matthew Hatton (born 1981), professional boxer
- Ricky Hatton (1978–2025), professional boxer; light welterweight world champion
- Eric Haydock (1943–2019), musician, best known as the original bassist of the Hollies
- Geoffrey Hayes (1942–2018), television presenter and actor
- Jennifer Hennessy (born 1970), actress
- James Hickman (born 1976), five times world champion swimmer; TV producer
- Wendy Hiller (1912–2003), film and stage actress
- Gerard Horan (born 1962), actor, known for playing Leslie 'Charisma' Appleby in London's Burning
- William Houldsworth (1834–1917), industrialist and politician; born in Manchester; built Houldsworth Mill, the surrounding housing and St Elizabeth's Church in Reddish
- Dominic Howard (born 1977), Stockport-born drummer of the alternative rock band Muse

== I ==
- Tom Ince (born 1992), English footballer who plays for EFL Championship club Watford

== J ==
- Owen Jones (born 1984), newspaper columnist, commentator, journalist, author and political activist
- Barb Jungr (born 1954), singer, songwriter and theatre writer

== K ==
- Arthur Kadmon (born 1958), guitarist with post-punk bands from Manchester, including Ludus and the Fall
- Sylvia Kay (1936–2019), character actress
- Michael Keane (born 1993), professional football player playing for Everton F.C., twin brother of Will
- Will Keane (born 1993), professional football player playing for Wigan Athletic, twin brother of Michael
- Michelle Keegan (born 1987), actress, known for her roles as Tina McIntyre in Coronation Street and Georgie Lane in Our Girl

== L ==
- Horace Lamb, (1849–1934), applied mathematician and technical author
- Bronte Law (born 1995), professional golfer
- Adam Le Fondre (born 1986), English professional footballer
- Sally Lindsay (born 1973), actress, played Shelley Unwin in Coronation Street
- Alan Lowndes (1921–1978), painter

== M ==
- Kobbie Mainoo (born 2005), professional footballer
- Timmy Mallett (born 1955), TV presenter, broadcaster, author and artist
- Jason Manford (born 1981), comedian, television presenter and actor, known for roles on comedy panel shows such as 8 Out of 10 Cats and Odd One Out
- John Mayall (1933–2024), blues and rock musician with John Mayall & the Bluesbreakers, grew up in Cheadle Hulme
- Mark McGeeney (born 1972), darts player
- Wayne McGregor (born 1970), multi award-winning choreographer and director
- Tim McInnerny (born 1956), actor; born and brought up in Cheadle Hulme; played Lord Percy Percy and Captain Kevin Darling in Blackadder
- Tyrone Mears (born 1983), English-Sierra Leonean former footballer who played with Seattle Sounders FC
- Will Mellor (born 1976) actor and singer, known as Gaz Wilkinson in Two Pints of Lager
- Mick Middles, music journalist, known for biographies of Frank Sidebottom and Ian Curtis
- Danny Miller (born 1991) actor, known for playing Aaron Dingle in Emmerdale
- Dominic Monaghan (born 1976), film actor known for his role as Merry Brandybuck in The Lord of the Rings
- Sir John Voce Moore (1826–1904), Lord Mayor of London, 1898
- Roger Moorhouse (born 1968), historian and author
- Carol Morley (born 1966), film director, screenwriter and producer
- Paul Morley (born 1957), music journalist, musician, producer and founder of record label ZTT Records
- Alan Morrissey (born 1982), actor known for his role of Nicky Van Barr in Holby City, alongside a theatre career
- Vicky Myers (born 1976), actress, known for her role as DS Lisa Swain on Coronation Street

== O ==
- Tom Ogden, lead vocalist and primary songwriter of the indie pop band Blossoms
- Tony O'Shea (born 1961), darts player who competes in British Darts Organisation events

== P ==
- Fred Perry (1909–1995), former World No.1 tennis player and Wimbledon Champion; born in Portwood and granted the freedom of Stockport in 1934
- Samuel Perry (1877–1954), MP for Kettering; father of Fred Perry
- Christopher Priest (1943–2024), novelist and science fiction writer

== R ==
- Gabrielle Ray (1883–1973), stage actress, dancer and singer
- Angela Rayner (born 1980), Labour politician, MP for Ashton-under-Lyne and former Deputy Prime Minister of the United Kingdom
- Fred Ridgway (1923–2015), first-class cricketer; played for Kent; represented England in five Test matches; born in Stockport
- Sally Rogers (born 1964), actress, best known for her role as Detective Constable/Sgt. Jo Masters in The Bill

== S ==
- Daz Sampson (born 1974), music/television producer; 2006 UK Eurovision Song Contest contestant
- Chris Sanders (born 1998), first-class cricketer
- Tim Scott, instrumental recording artist
- Sophie Skelton, actress
- Sir Edmund Shaa (died 1488), Lord Mayor of London, 1482 and founder of Stockport Grammar School. Born in Mottram
- Darren Shahlavi (1972–2015), actor, martial artist and stuntman
- Samantha Siddall (born 1982), Reddish-born actress known for playing Mandy Maguire in Shameless
- Richard Sykes (1839–1923), rugby player who helped found two major clubs; landowner in North Dakota, US; founded five towns there, one named after his birthplace of Edgeley

== T ==
- Steve Thomas (born 1963), retired ice hockey right winger; born in Stockport; played 20 seasons in the NHL
- Constance Travis (1911–2015), stage actress and philanthropist
- Maurice Tremlett (1923–1984), first-class cricketer; played for Somerset; represented England in three Test matches; born in Stockport

== W ==
- Matthew Walker (born 1978), swimmer who has participated in four Paralympic Games.
- Paul Warhurst (born 1969), Stockport-born footballer who played for many clubs, including Blackburn Rovers, Bolton Wanderers, Oldham Athletic, and Sheffield Wednesday
- Joanne Whalley (born 1961), actress; born in Salford; grew up in Stockport
- Ethan Wheatley (born 2006), professional footballer
- Hannah Whelan (born 1992), gymnast who represented the United Kingdom at the 2008 Summer Olympics; lives and trains in Stockport
- Sir Joseph Whitworth (1803–1887), Victorian engineer who has given his name to many Manchester buildings and streets; born in Stockport
- Marty Willson-Piper (born 1958), singer, songwriter, guitarist. Former longtime member of Australian band the Church and UK band All About Eve; plays guitar in Swedish band Anekdoten
- Rick Witter (born 1972), Stockport-born singer, songwriter and frontman of the York-based rock band Shed Seven
- Aimee Lou Wood (born 1995), actress and writer
- Kaye Wragg (born 1972), actress in The Bill and Holby City

== Y ==
- Mike Yarwood (1941–2023), impressionist, comedian and actor, born in Bredbury.

== See also ==
- List of people from Greater Manchester
