= List of people from the City of Salford =

This is a list of people from Salford, a city in North West England. This list includes people from Salford and the wider City of Salford, and thus may include people from Eccles, Swinton, Worsley and other outlying areas of Salford. This list is arranged alphabetically by surname:

Table of contents:
A B C D E F G H I J K L M N O P Q R S T U V W X Y Z
See also • References

== A ==
- Lilias Armstrong (1882–1937), phonetician; born in Pendlebury
- Tom Aspinall (born 1993), mixed martial artist; born in Salford

== B ==
- David Bamber (born 1954), actor; born in Walkden
- Geoff Bent (1932–1958), English footballer; one of the eight Manchester United players who lost their lives in the Munich air disaster; born at Irlams o' th' Height, Salford
- Nick Blackman (born 1989), English-Israeli footballer
- David Bleakley (1817–1882), cricketer
- Hazel Blears (born 1956), Labour Party politician, MP for Salford and former cabinet minister
- George Bradshaw (1800–1853), cartographer and publisher, produced railway guides and timetables known as Bradshaw's Guide
- Francis Brandt (1840–1925), cricketer and Madras High Court judge
- Harold Brighouse (1882–1958), playwright and author best known for Hobson's Choice, set in Salford
- Elkie Brooks (born 1945), singer, born in Salford
- Tim Burgess (born 1967), singer, songwriter
- Morgan Burtwistle (born 2001), Streamer, YouTuber
- Wes Butters (born 1979), broadcaster, writer, and filmmaker

== C ==
- Sydney Chapman (1888–1970), mathematician and geophysicist
- Helen Cherry (1915-2001), English stage, film and television actress, born in Worsley.
- Allan Clarke (born 1942), singer with The Hollies
- John Cooper Clarke (born 1949), performance poet from Higher Broughton
- Eddie Colman (1936–1958), Manchester United footballer who died in the Munich air disaster in 1958; born on Archie Street in Salford
- Alistair Cooke (1908–2004), U.S. journalist and broadcaster; born in Salford
- William Cooke (1821–1894), clergyman hymn-writer, born in Eccles
- William Crabtree (1610–1644), astronomer, mathematician and merchant; one of only two people to observe and record the first predicted transit of Venus in 1639.
- Andy Crane (born 1964), television and radio presenter, lived for a time in Salford

== D ==
- Keith Dalziel (1921–1994), biochemist known for contributions to enzymology
- Alfred Darbyshire (1839–1908), architect and painter
- Freddie Davies (born 1937), comedian and actor with Opportunity Knocks
- Sir Peter Maxwell Davies (1934–2016), Salford-born composer and Master of the Queen's Music (2004-2016)
- Brenda De Banzie (1909–1981), actress, moved to Salford as a child
- Shelagh Delaney (1938–2011), playwright, best known for the play A Taste of Honey
- Arthur Thomas Doodson (1890–1968), oceanographer

== E ==
- Terry Eagleton (born 1943), literary theorist born and brought up in Salford
- Christopher Eccleston (born 1964), Salford-born, Little Hulton-brought up stage, film and television actor

== F ==
- James Fearnley (born 1954), musician; native of Worsley
- Albert Finney (1936–2019), stage and film actor
- Clinton Ford (1931–2009), classic-pop singer
- Stephen Foster (born 1980), super featherweight boxer

== G ==
- Stephen Gallagher (born 1954), novelist, screenwriter; born in Salford Chimera (British TV series), Eleventh Hour (American TV series)
- Ryan Giggs (born 1973), footballer; moved to Pendlebury as a child
- Joe Gladwin (1906–1987), actor, played Wally Batty in the Last of the Summer Wine
- Tom Glynn-Carney (born 1995), actor, born in Salford
- Walter Greenwood (1903–1974), novelist, best known for the book and film Love on the Dole
- John Gregory (1806—1848), railway and naval engineer aboard HMS Erebus during Franklin's Lost Expedition

== H ==
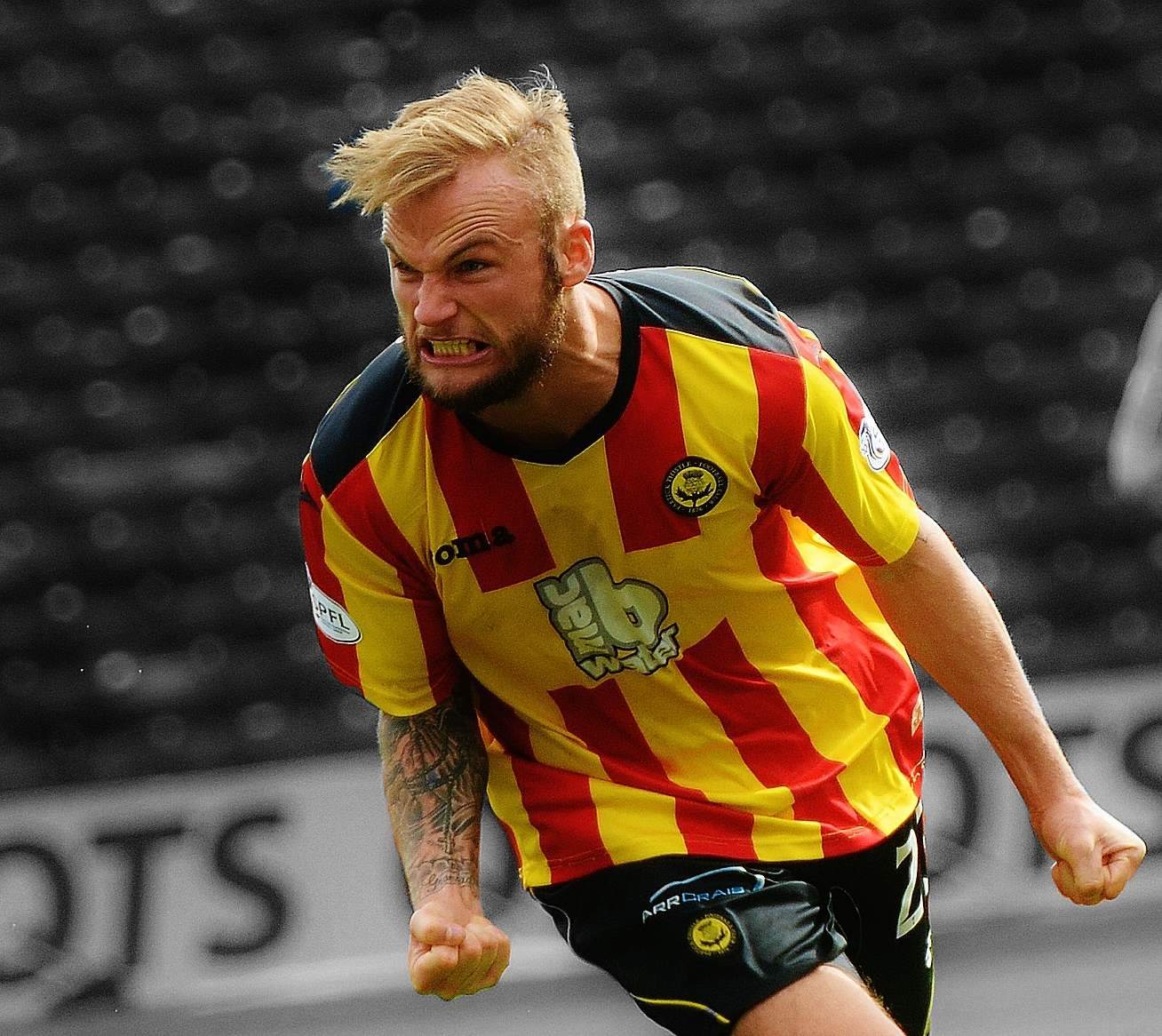
Football player Kallum Higginbotham, who previously played for local football club Salford City

- Christine Hargreaves (1939–1984), actress, played Christine Hardman in Coronation Street
- Ren Harvieu (born 1990), singer-songwriter
- James Hazeldine (1947–2002), TV, stage and film actor and director
- Chelsee Healey (born 1988), actress, plays Goldie McQueen in Hollyoaks.
- Margaret Hewitt (1928–1991), sociologist, she opposed women's Church ordination
- Kallum Higginbotham (born 1989), professional footballer, currently playing as a striker for Kilmarnock in the Scottish Premiership
- Isabel Hodgins (born 1993), actress, plays Victoria Sugden in Emmerdale
- Shelley Holroyd (born 1973), Olympic javelin thrower
- Dean Holden (born 1979), former footballer, currently assistant manager at Oldham Athletic
- Peter Hook (born 1956), bassist of the bands Joy Division and New Order

== J ==
- Rob James-Collier (born 1976), actor and model, played Liam Connor in Coronation Street
- Maggie Jones (1934–2009), actress, played Blanche Hunt in Coronation Street
- James Prescott Joule (1818–1889), physicist, developed the unit of energy, the joule

== K ==
- Joseph Kay (1821–1878), economist and judge
- Damian Keeley (born 1963), former professional footballer
- Yousaf Ali Khan, film director; grew up in Salford
- Ayub Khan-Din (born 1961), actor and playwright who grew up in Salford
- Ben Kingsley (born 1943), actor, grew up in Pendlebury
- Pat Kirkwood (1921–2007), musical theatre actress

== L ==
- Marc Leach (born 1994), professional boxer
- Mike Leigh (born 1943), writer and director; grew up in Broughton
- Stephen Lord (born 1971), actor; grew up in Langworthy
- L.S. Lowry (1887–1976), artist, lived in Pendlebury from 1909 to 1948

== M ==
- Ewan MacColl (1915–1989), folk singer, writer
- Nathan Maguire (born 1997), wheelchair racer
- Jason Manford (born 1981), comedian and former host of the BBC's The One Show
- William Worrall Mayo (1819–1911), a British-American medical doctor and chemist; founder of the famous Mayo Clinic in Rochester, Minnesota, U.S., born in Salford
- Jamie Moore (born 1978), former British light-middleweight boxing champion
- Sir Norman Moore, 1st Baronet (1847–1922), doctor and medical historian
- John Moores (1896–1993), businessman, founded Littlewoods
- Adrian Morley (born 1977), rugby league player for Great Britain, England, Leeds, Sydney Roosters, Warrington and Salford

== N ==
- Graham Nash (born 1942), singer and musician with the Hollies and Crosby, Stills, Nash & Young; grew up in Salford
- Cornelius Nicholls (1838–1895), cricketer

== P ==
- Emmeline Pankhurst (1858–1928), founder of the British suffragette movement; lived for a time in Salford
- Sacha Parkinson (born 1992), actress played Sian Powers in Coronation Street
- Charlie Pawsey (1923–2012), rugby league player
- Stan Pearson (1919–1997), footballer, played 490 games
- Robert Powell (born 1944), TV presenter and film actor, played Richard Hannay in Thirty-nine Steps
- John Henry Poynting (1852–1914), physicist
- Holly Peers (born 1987), glamour model
- Karl Pilkington (born 1972), actor, comedian and radio presenter
- Zack Polanski (born 1982), politician

== R ==
- Emily Ramsey (born 2000), Everton goalkeeper
- Harold Riley (1934–2023), artist, painted life in Salford
- Robert Roberts (1905–1974), author and social historian
- Alliott Verdon Roe (1877–1958), pioneer pilot and aircraft manufacturer
- Shaun Ryder (born 1962), vocalist and songwriter with the Happy Mondays

== S ==
- Paul Scholes (born 1974), football midfielder with England and Manchester United; born in Salford.
- Edward Schunck (1820–1903), chemist, worked with dyes
- Randolph Schwabe (1885–1948), draughtsman and painter; Slade Professor of Fine Art from 1930–48
- Mark E. Smith (1957–2018), musician with The Fall
- Bernard Sumner (born 1956), singer and musician with Joy Division and New Order
- Mike Sweeney (born 1947), radio broadcaster, musician and DJ

== T ==
- Lewis Tan (born 1987), actor and martial artist
- Adam Thomas (born 1988), actor, played Donte Charles in Waterloo Road
- John Thomson (born 1969), actor and comedian

== V ==
- John Virgo (born 1946), former snooker player; currently commentator

== W ==
- Mike Walker (born 1962), jazz guitarist
- Tony Warren (1936–2016), TV scriptwriter, established Coronation Street
- Russell Watson (born 1966), tenor singer
- William Webb Ellis (1806–1872), Anglican clergyman, credited as the inventor of rugby football
- Joanne Whalley (born 1961), actress
- William Joseph Whelan (1924–2021) American biochemist, born in Salford.
- Don Whillans (1933–1985), climber and mountaineer
- Tony Wilson (1950–2007), radio and TV presenter and journalist with Granada Television & BBC
- Benedict Wong (born 1971), actor, born in Eccles.
- Kenneth Wolstenholme (1920–2002), football commentator for BBC television in the 1950s and 1960s, most notable for his commentary during the 1966 FIFA World Cup which included the famous phrase "they think it's all over... it is now"
- Arthur Woolliscroft (1904–1977, footballer, played for Manchester City, Leicester City, Watford and Northwich Victoria
- Thomas Worthington (1826–1909), architect

== Y ==
- Leslie Yoxall (1914–2005), cryptographer and codebreaker at Bletchley Park; born in Salford

== See also ==
- List of people from Greater Manchester

== Bibliography ==
- Purvis, June (2002), Emmeline Pankhurst, Routledge, ISBN 0-415-23978-8
- Jenkins, Simon (2004), Introduction to Alistair Cooke's Letter from America, Penguin
