= BSS Industrial =

British specialist distributor

The BSS Group Limited
- Trade name: BSS
- Company type: Subsidiary
- Industry: Building materials
- Founded: 1899
- Headquarters: Northampton, England, UK
- Owner: Travis Perkins Group
- Website: www.bssindustrial.co.uk

BSS Industrial is a British specialist distributor of heating, ventilation, pipeline and mechanical services equipment, based in Leicester. The business had previously operated as part of the BSS Group prior to its acquisition by the Travis Perkins Group in December 2010.

== History ==
The company was founded in the East Midlands in 1899 as British Steam Specialties. During 2001, the firm underwent restructuring. During the early to mid 2000s, BSS Group reported strong financial performance, which often exceeded market expectations, and was partially attributed to the British government's spending on social housing, public health and education schemes. On the back of this performance, BSS entered the FTSE 250 Index in 2005.

BSS completed numerous acquisitions around this period; these included UBM Cadel (rebranded as PTS) in 1999, specialist valve distributors Pegler & Louden in December 2003, Price Tools and Spendlove C Jebb in 2006, Buck & Hickman in 2007 (subsequently sold in 2011 by the new owners of BSS), Birchwood Products in 2008, Direct Heating Spares in 2009, and UGS, a privately owned underground drainage merchant, in 2010.

In response to the start of the Great Recession in 2008, which caused a slow down in the wider construction market, BSS gave notice of possible job cuts in response to declining profitability. In 2010, it was reported that profits had sharply increased at the company.

On 28 May 2010, the board of BSS Group accepted an indicative £553 million takeover offer from the UK-based builders' merchant Travis Perkins. This transaction, which was subject to approval from the Office of Fair Trading, was completed on 14 December 2010, at which point BSS Group shares were delisted from the London Stock Exchange.

== Operations ==
BSS Industrial is a supplier of pipeline, process, heating and mechanical services equipment. Its customers range from large national contractors to small, local independents. The company's primary route to market is via a nationwide network of 63 branches. BSS has operated a central warehouse in Lutterworth alongside its dedicated distribution centre in Coventry.
