= Gianni Di Marzio =

Italian football manager (1940–2022)

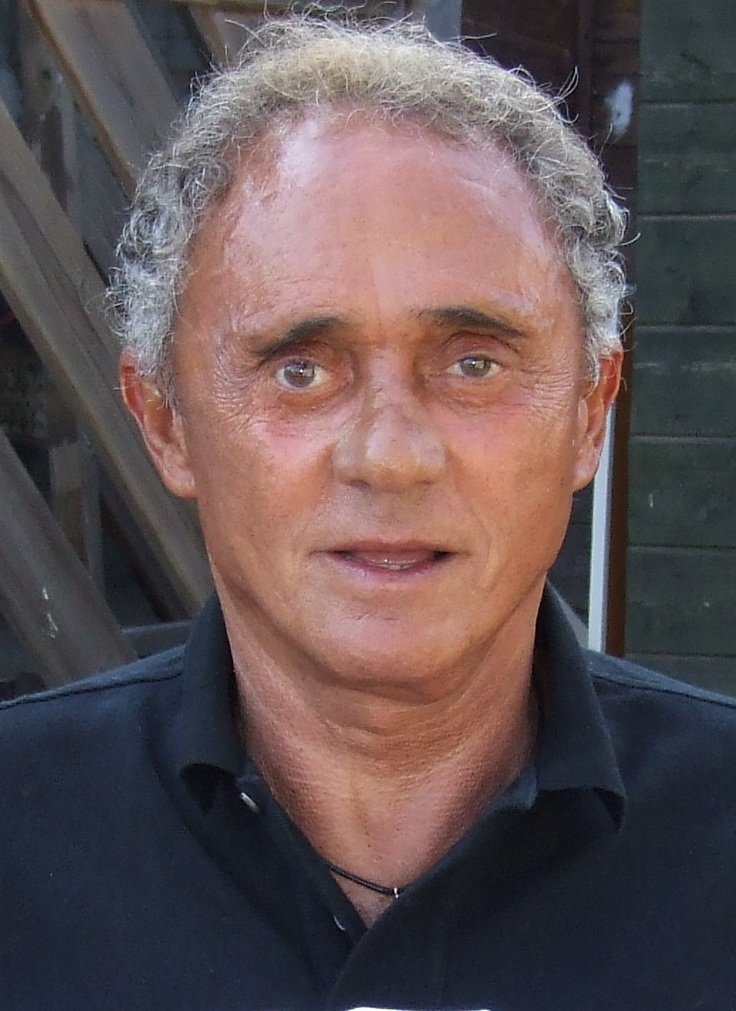
- Di Marzio in 2009

Personal information
- Full name: Giovanni Di Marzio
- Date of birth: 8 January 1940
- Place of birth: Naples, Italy
- Date of death: 22 January 2022 (aged 82)
- Place of death: Padova, Italy

Senior career*
Years	Team	Apps	(Gls)
1963–1964	Juve Stabia		

Managerial career
- 1968–1969: Internapoli (assistant)
- 1969–1971: Napoli (youth)
- 1971–1972: Nocerina
- 1972–1973: Juve Stabia
- 1973–1974: Brindisi
- 1974–1977: Catanzaro
- 1977–1979: Napoli
- 1979–1980: Genoa
- 1980–1982: Lecce
- 1982–1983: Catania
- 1984–1985: Padova
- 1987–1988: Cosenza
- 1988–1989: Catanzaro
- 1989–1990: Cosenza
- 1991–1992: Palermo
- 1996–1998: Venezia (director of sports)
- 2001–2006: Juventus (scout)
- 2011–2016: Queens Park Rangers (scout)
- * Club domestic league appearances and goals

Giovanni "Gianni" Di Marzio (8 January 1940 – 22 January 2022) was an Italian professional football manager.

== Career ==
After leaving his footballer career for an injury, Di Marzio debuted as a manager in 1968 in Serie C. He had his breakout as the coach of Catanzaro, where after his second season in charge, led the team to an unexpected promotion to Serie A in 1976. The team then finished 15th in only their second ever Serie A campaign and were automatically relegated. Di Marzio had shown enough to earn a move to Napoli for the following season.

With Napoli, Di Marzio was a Coppa Italia finalist in 1978, losing the trophy against Inter Milan. In 1983 he brought Catania in Serie A, and in 1988 Cosenza in Serie B. He retired from management after failing to rescue Palermo from relegation in 1992.

Di Marzio successively took on a career as a football pundit and manager, working as Maurizio Zamparini's collaborator during his periods at Venezia and Palermo, as well as transfer consultant and scout at Queens Park Rangers.

== Managerial statistics ==
Team	Nat	From	To	League Record					Cup Record					Total				
Team	Nat	From	To	G	W	D	L	Win %	G	W	D	L	Win %	G	W	D	L	Win %
U.S. Catanzaro 1929	Italy	1 July 1974	30 June 1977	106	36	39	31	33.96	12	2	4	6	16.67	119	38	43	38	31.93
U.S. Catanzaro 1929	Italy	1 July 1988	30 June 1989	31	7	14	10	22.58	0	0	0	0	—	31	7	14	10	22.58
Total				137	43	53	41	31.39	12	2	4	6	16.67	150	45	57	48	30.00

== Personal life ==
Di Marzio's son, Gianluca, is an Italian football journalist and pundit, working with Sky Italia.

== Death ==
He died in Padua on 22 January 2022, at the age of 82.
