= List of people from Greater Manchester =

The list of people from Greater Manchester, in North West England, is divided by metropolitan borough. The demonym of Greater Manchester is "Greater Mancunian":

1. Manchester
2. Stockport
3. Tameside
4. Oldham
5. Rochdale
6. Bury
7. Bolton
8. Wigan
9. Salford
10. Trafford
