= Dino Ballacci =

Italian footballer and manager (1924-2013)

Personal information
- Full name: Dino Ballacci
- Date of birth: 24 May 1924
- Place of birth: Bologna, Italy
- Date of death: 6 August 2013 (aged 89)
- Position: Defender

Youth career
- Bologna

Senior career*
Years	Team	Apps	(Gls)
1945–1957	Bologna	306	(8)
1957–1958	Lecco	28	(1)
1958–1959	Portogruaro	27	(0)

International career
1953–1954	Italy B	2	(0)
1954	Italy	1	(0)

Managerial career
- 1964–1965: Reggiana
- 1965–1966: Catanzaro
- 1966–1967: Catania
- 1967–1968: Prato
- 1969–1970: Catanzaro
- 1970–1973: Arezzo
- 1973–1974: Alessandria
- 1974–1976: Pistoiese
- 1976–1978: Arezzo
- 1980: Anconitana
- 1980–1982: Alessandria
- 1985–1986: Aesernia
- 1988: Alessandria
- * Club domestic league appearances and goals as of 1 March 2010

Dino Ballacci (Italian pronunciation: [ˈdiːno balˈlattʃi]; 24 May 1924 – 6 August 2013) was an Italian football player and manager, who played as a defender.

== Playing career ==
=== Club ===
During his football career, Ballacci became one of the most representative players of Bologna F.C. in the Fifties. He played more than 300 matches in rossoblù.

=== International ===
In 1954, Ballacci made his only senior appearance with the Italy national team in a World Cup qualifying match against Egypt, which Italy won 5–1.

== Managerial career ==
As a coach, he led Catanzaro to a Coppa Italia final in 1966; he gained a promotion to Serie B with Alessandria (1973), a promotion in Serie C with Pistoiese (1974) and another promotion in Serie C1 again with Alessandria (1981).

He retired in 1988.

=== Managerial statistics ===
Team	Nat	From	To	League Record					Cup Record					Total				
Team	Nat	From	To	G	W	D	L	Win %	G	W	D	L	Win %	G	W	D	L	Win %
U.S. Catanzaro 1929	Italy	1 July 1965	30 June 1966	38	10	16	12	26.32	6	4	1	1	66.67	44	14	17	13	31.82
U.S. Catanzaro 1929	Italy	1 July 1969	30 June 1970	38	7	19	12	18.42	3	1	1	1	33.33	41	8	20	13	19.51
Total				76	17	35	24	22.37	9	5	2	2	55.56	85	22	37	26	25.88

== Death ==
Ballacci died on 6 August 2013.
