= 1972 Anglo-Italian Cup =

Tournament details
- Country: England and Italy
- Teams: 12

Final positions
- Champions: Roma
- Runners-up: Blackpool

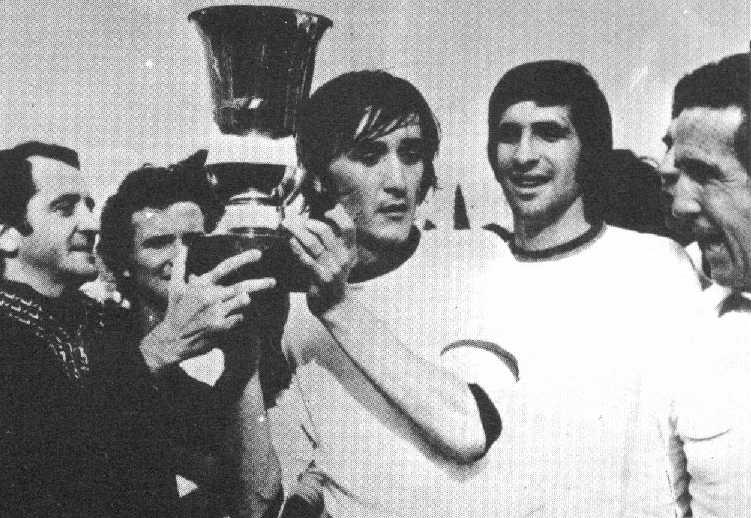
A.S. Roma captain Franco "Ciccio" Cordova lifts the 1972 Anglo-Italian Cup trophy after the final victory over Blackpool F.C. (3-1); Rome (Italy), Stadio Olimpico, 24 June 1972.

The 1972 Anglo-Italian Cup was the third staging of the Anglo-Italian Cup, an annual association football tournament between clubs from England and Italy. It featured twelve teams — six from each country.

The competition started on 1 June 1972 and concluded on 24 June 1972 with the final match between the winners of the English and Italian sections of the competition. Roma beat the 1971 winners, Blackpool, by three goals to one in the Stadio Olimpico in Rome.

== Details ==
The twelve participating teams were divided into three groups of four, each group comprising two teams from England and two from Italy. Each team played the two teams from the other country, once at home and once away. The teams were then ranked against teams from their own country on a league basis, and the top ranked teams from each country played off in a final for the trophy.

=== Participating teams ===
England

- Birmingham City
- Blackpool
- Carlisle United
- Leicester City
- Stoke City
- Sunderland

Italy

- Atalanta
- Cagliari
- Catanzaro
- Roma
- Sampdoria
- Lanerossi Vicenza

== Group results ==
=== Group 1 ===
1 June 1972	Catanzaro	0–3	Stoke City

1 June 1972	Roma	2–3	Carlisle United

4 June 1972	Catanzaro	0–1	Carlisle United

5 June 1972	Roma	2–0	Stoke City

7 June 1972	Stoke City	2–0	Catanzaro

7 June 1972	Carlisle United	3–3	Roma

10 June 1972	Carlisle United	4–1	Catanzaro

10 June 1972	Stoke City	1–2	Roma

=== Group 2 ===
1 June 1972	Cagliari	1–0	Leicester City

2 June 1972	Atalanta	3–2	Sunderland	Stadio Atleti Azzurri d'Italia, Bergamo
			Kerr; Lathan

4 June 1972	Cagliari	1–3	Sunderland	Stadio Sant'Elia, Cagliari
			Kerr; Lathan; Tueart

4 June 1972	Atalanta	5–3	Leicester City

7 June 1972	Leicester City	2–1	Cagliari

7 June 1972	Sunderland	0–0	Atalanta	Roker Park, Sunderland
				Attendance: 5,798

10 June 1972	Sunderland	3–3	Cagliari	Roker Park, Sunderland
	McGiven; Dave Watson; Tueart			Attendance: 4,010

10 June 1972	Leicester City	6–0	Atalanta

=== Group 3 ===
1 June 1972	Sampdoria	1–4	Blackpool

1 June 1972	Lanerossi Vicenza	0–0	Birmingham City
				Attendance: 3,000

4 June 1972	Sampdoria	2–1	Birmingham City
			Campbell (pen.)	Attendance: 15,000

4 June 1972	Lanerossi Vicenza	0–2	Blackpool

7 June 1972	Blackpool	2–0	Sampdoria	Bloomfield Road, Blackpool

7 June 1972	Birmingham City	5–3	Lanerossi Vicenza	St Andrew's, Birmingham
	R. Latchford; Francis; Hatton; Taylor			Attendance: 23,642

10 June 1972	Blackpool	10–0	Lanerossi Vicenza	Bloomfield Road, Blackpool
	Burns 2' 58' 60' 71'; Ainscow; Suddick 15'; James 31'; Stanzial 49' (o.g.); Hill

10 June 1972	Birmingham City	2–0	Sampdoria	St Andrew's, Birmingham
	R. Latchford; Hatton			Attendance: 19,510

== Final rankings ==
Total points were determined by points gained (two for a win, one for a draw) plus goals scored.

=== English rankings ===
Team	Pld	W	D	L	GF	GA	Pts	Total
Blackpool	4	4	0	0	18	1	8	26
Carlisle United	4	3	1	0	11	6	7	18
Leicester City	4	2	0	2	11	7	4	15
Birmingham City	4	2	1	1	8	5	5	13
Sunderland	4	1	2	1	8	7	4	12
Stoke City	4	2	0	2	6	4	4	10

=== Italian rankings ===
Team	Pld	W	D	L	GF	GA	Pts	Total
Roma	4	2	1	1	9	7	5	14
Atalanta	4	2	1	1	8	11	5	13
Cagliari	4	1	1	2	6	8	3	9
Sampdoria	4	1	0	3	3	9	2	5
Lanerossi Vicenza	4	0	1	3	3	17	1	4
Catanzaro	4	0	0	4	1	10	0	1

== Final ==
24 June 1972	Roma	3–1	Blackpool	Stadio Olimpico
	Cappellini 49'; Scaratti 75'; Zigoni 86'		Alcock 89'	Attendance: 75,000
