= Travis Perkins =

British builders' merchant and home improvement retailer

Travis Perkins plc
- Type: Public
- Traded as: LSE: TPK; FTSE 250 component
- ISIN: GB0007739609
- Industry: Business-to-business, Retail
- Founded: 1988, through merger between Travis & Arnold & Sandell Perkins
- Headquarters: Northampton, United Kingdom
- Area served: United Kingdom
- Key people: Geoff Drabble (Chair); Gavin Slark (CEO)
- Products: Building and home improvement materials, tool hire
- Revenue: ▼£4,564.6 million (2025)
- Operating income: ▼£(96.6) million (2025)
- Net income: ▼£(176.3) million (2025)
- Subsidiaries: Toolstation; Keyline; BSS; Benchmarx; CCF
- Website: travisperkinsplc.co.uk travisperkins.co.uk

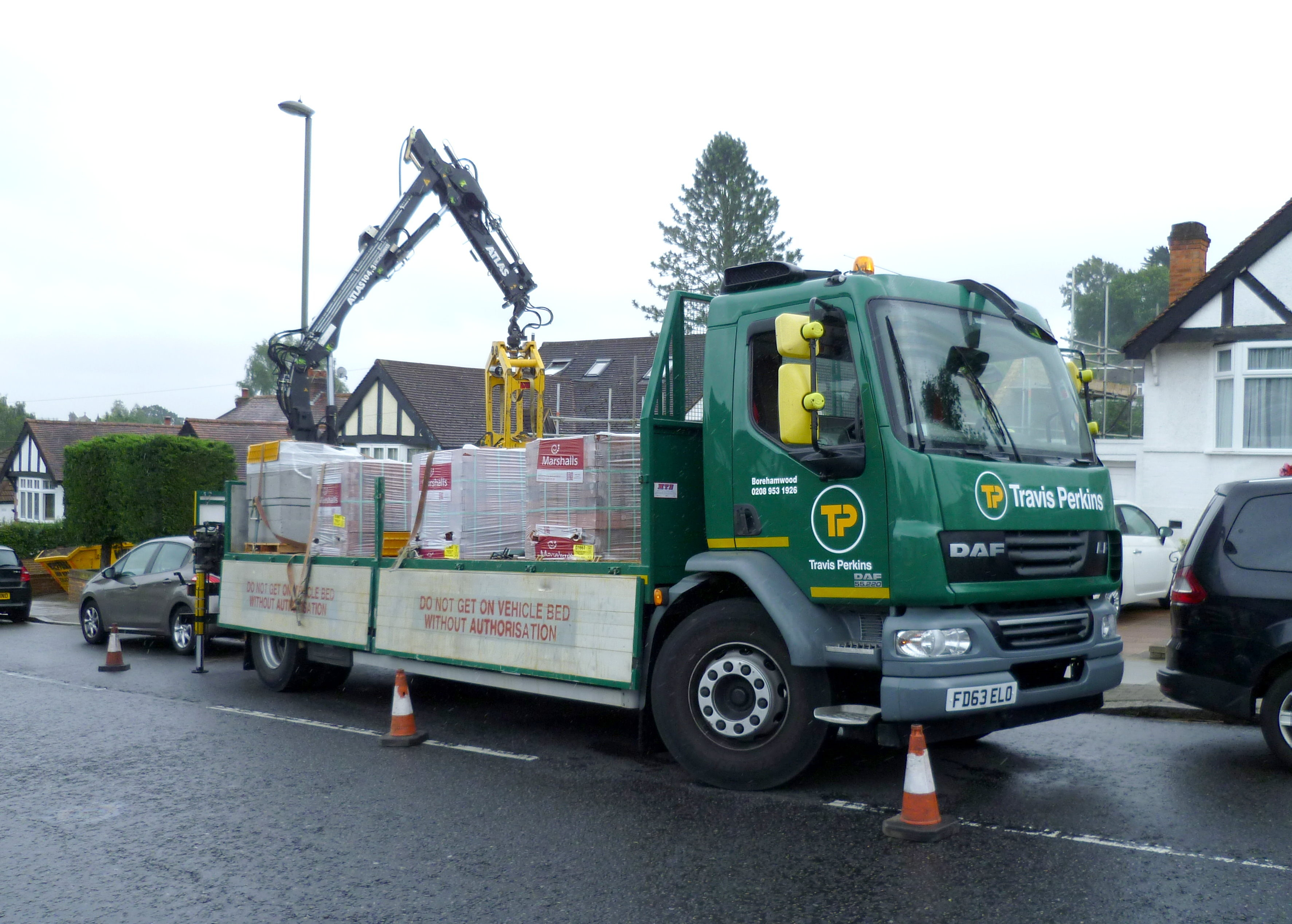
A lorry for Travis Perkins unloading in London. (2015)

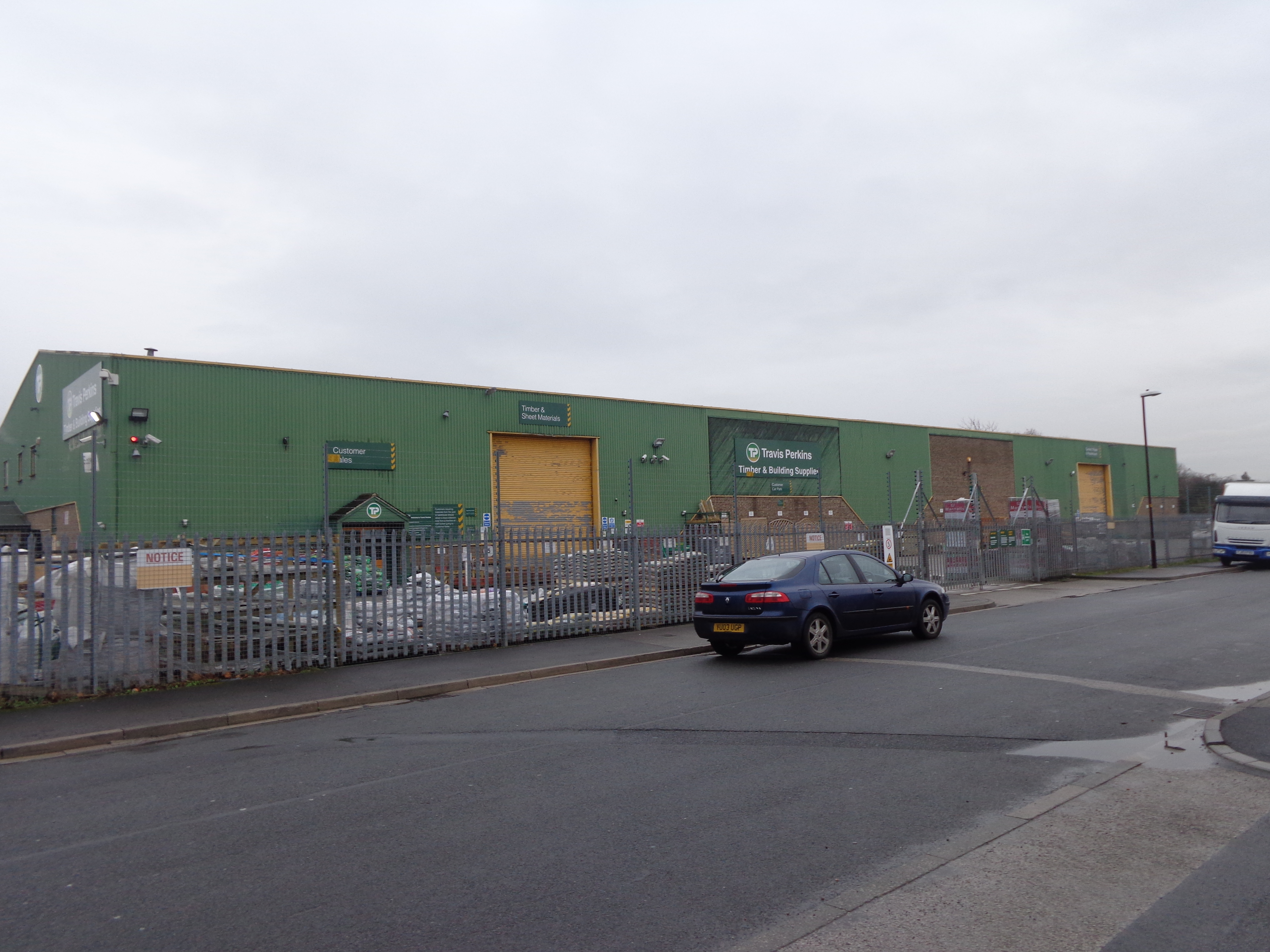
A typical Travis Perkins yard. (2014)

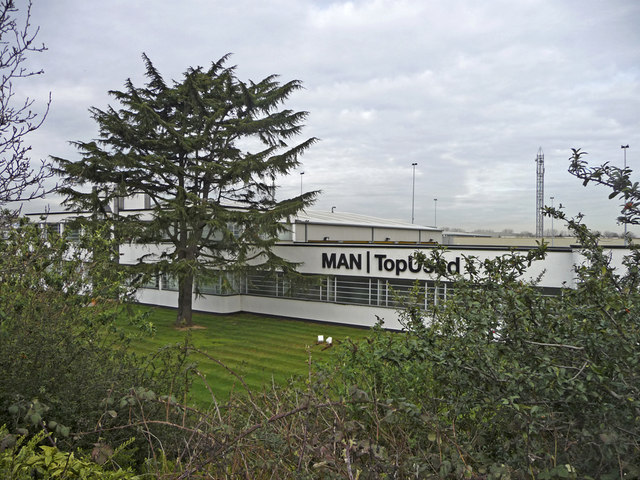
The former Ripaults Factory, a grade II listed building in Enfield, taken over by Travis Perkins in 2015.

Travis Perkins plc is a British builders' merchant and home improvement retailer with head offices based in Northampton. It is listed on the London Stock Exchange, and is a constituent of the FTSE 250 Index. Through its Toolstation subsidiary, the group also has operations in mainland Europe.

== History ==
Travis Perkins can trace its origins back to 1797 and the Benjamin Ingram company of joiners and carpenters, which was founded that year at Beech Street in London. Benjamin Ingram subsequently merged with Perkins to become Ingram Perkins in 1850. Ingram Perkins then merged with Sandell Smythe & Drayson in 1970 to form Sandell Perkins.

As Sandell Perkins, the firm was first listed on the London Stock Exchange in 1986. Two years later, it merged with Travis & Arnold to form Travis Perkins. (Travis & Arnold had been founded by Ernest Travis in 1899. Originally operating in London, the company moved to Northampton in 1904, with the Midlands becoming its core market.)

Subsequent acquisitions have included AAH (46 branches) in March 1994, BMSS (26 branches) in December 1995, Keyline Builders Merchants (101 branches) in May 1999, and Sharpe & Fisher (38 branches) in 1998, Broombys Limited (nine branches) in January 2000, City Plumbing Supplies Limited (48 branches) in July 2002, and Commercial Ceiling Factors (twenty distribution centres) in October 2002, Jayhard (53 branches) in August 2003, and B&G (twelve branches) in October 2003, Wickes (171 stores) in December 2004, and Tile Giant in November 2007.

As a consequence of the 2008 financial crisis, Travis Perkins, along with the wider construction industry, went through a particularly challenging trading period; consequently, the firm suspended its dividend and indicated that it was open to declaring a rights issue in early 2009.

In May 2010, Travis Perkins made a successful offer to acquire BSS Group for £553 million, Two years later, it acquired the remaining 70% stake in Toolstation in January 2012, and the whole of Solfex in January 2013.

In November 2017, Travis Perkins sought support from the local community in Pimlico, when the oldest timber yard in the United Kingdom, owned by Travis Perkins, was threatened by closure to allow a housing development to proceed.

In December 2018, Travis Perkins announced plans to sell City Plumbing Supplies and its other plumbing and heating businesses. However, in October 2019, Travis Perkins announced this plan had been put on hold.

The 2010s was a decade of considerable growth for Travis Perkins; between 2012 and 2016, revenue increased from £4.8 billion to £6.2 billion. However, a restructure of the company enacted during the late 2010s was responsible for a £350 million drop in profits recorded in early 2019.

In June 2020, amid the COVID-19 pandemic in the United Kingdom, Travis Perkins announced plans to close 165 branches and cut 2,500 jobs. In September 2020, it was reported that the firm's restructuring effort, which is intended to save £120 million annually, involved the one-off cost of £111 million. One month later, it was announced that Travis Perkins had sold Tile Giant to Coverings Ltd.

In April 2021, the demerger of Wickes Group plc was completed. One month later, the company announced that it had agreed to sell its plumbing and heating businesses to H.I.G. Capital.

In 2021, amid industry-wide materials shortages, Travis Perkins' management publicly appealed for customers to place orders as early as possible to avoid delays. That same year, the company's chief executive stated that cost was the principal barrier to increased prevalence of low carbon building materials.

In March 2022, it recorded an adjusted operating profit of £353 million, a 175.8 per cent rise. Throughout the early 2020s, Travis Perkins observed that persistent price inflation would negatively impact its financial reports.

By 2024, approximately 20% of Travis Perkins' revenue came from Toolstation. Up to March 2024, Toolstation had continued to grow its UK market share, opening 163 new Toolstation branches between 2020 and 2022, and adding seven more in 2023. However, the firm's mainland Europe stores were reportedly underperforming, leading to Travis Perkins announced Toolstation was exiting the French market and reviewing its operations in Netherlands and Belgium in March 2024.

In April 2025, Travis Perkins declared a £38.4 million loss amid a decline in sales volume and wider construction activity. In March 2026, the firm recorded a larger pre-tax loss of £134.7 million.

== Operations ==
The company's product lines include general building materials, timber, plumbing & heating, kitchens, bathrooms, landscaping materials and tool hire.

== See also ==
- Constance Travis
