= Toolstation =

Retailer

Toolstation Limited
- Formerly: Tool Station Limited (February–July 2002)
- Type: subsidiary
- Industry: Retail
- Founded: February 12, 2002; 24 years ago in Cardiff, Wales
- Founder: Mark Goddard-Watts
- Headquarters: Bridgwater, Somerset, England
- Area served: United Kingdom; Netherlands; France; Germany; Belgium
- Key people: Lakhvir Sanghera (Managing Director)
- Products: tools, building materials
- Revenue: ▲£633 million (2020)
- Number of employees: 5000 (2021)
- Parent: Travis Perkins
- Website: toolstation.com

Toolstation Limited is a multi-channel retailer of tools and building materials. It has more than 500 branches in the UK, 90 in the Netherlands, 23 in France and 19 in Belgium. It was bought by Travis Perkins in 2014. The managing director is Lakhvir Sanghera.

== History ==
Toolstation was formed in February 2002 by Mark Goddard-Watts, one of the founding family members of Screwfix Direct.

In 2012 Goddard-Watts sold his shares to Travis Perkins plc. A distribution centre in Middleton, Greater Manchester opened in August 2018.

In 2019 Toolstation opened their 400th store, in Balham.

During the COVID-19 pandemic in the United Kingdom, Toolstation remained open to provide its essential products to the trade and the general public. During the initial stages of the pandemic, it adopted a click and collect based retail operation in the interest of customer and colleague safety, however this was later scrapped as the pandemic prevention restrictions were eased by the Government of the United Kingdom. Click and Collect is still available at all Toolstation sites and is the preferred method of purchasing by many.

In May 2023 Toolstation closed a distribution centre in Bridgwater and employees there went on to work at the Hinkley Point C nuclear power station.

Roughly 20% of Travis Perkins revenue comes from Toolstation. Up to March 2024, Toolstation had continued to grow its UK market share, opening 163 new Toolstation branches between 2020 and 2022, and adding seven more in 2023. However, its mainland Europe stores were doing less well, and Travis Perkins announced Toolstation was quitting France and reviewing its operations in Netherlands and Belgium. Toolstation France grew sales by 29% in 2023 but losses increased to £18m and it expected to lose another £20m in 2024. Operations in the Netherlands business were forecast to reach break-even by 2025 with Belgium forecast to break-even by 2028.
