= List of people from Trafford =

This is a list of people from Trafford, a metropolitan borough in North West England. This list includes people from the towns of Altrincham, Sale, Stretford and Urmston, and the smaller villages that make up Trafford. This list is arranged alphabetically by surname:

== A ==
- Lascelles Abercrombie (1881–1938): poet and literary critic who became a lecturer in poetry at the University of Liverpool; he was born in Ashton upon Mersey, an area of Sale.
- John George Adami (1862–1926): pathologist. Fellow of the Royal Society. Born in Ashton upon Mersey
- Edward Adamson (1911–1996): born in Sale, artist and pioneer of Art Therapy. Creator of the Adamson Collection, a major and internationally recognised collection of art created by people living in a mental asylum, Netherne Hospital, between 1946 and 1981. Author of 'Art as Healing' (1984).
- John Alcock, (1892–1919), Stretford aviator was the first man to pilot an aeroplane non-stop across the Atlantic in 1919.
- Helen Allingham (1848–1926): water colour artist who lived in Altrincham until the age of 14 and was the first woman to be admitted to the Royal Academy Schools

== B ==
- Michael Bishop (born 1942): multimillionaire businessman and owner and chairman of British Midland Airways who grew up in Hale and Bowdon.
- Edward Kinder Bradbury (born 1881, Altrincham): awarded the Victoria Cross for gallantry and ability in organising the defence of 'L' Battery against heavy odds at Nery on 1 September 1914.
- Robert Bolt (1924–1995): Oscar-winning playwright and screenwriter who was brought up in Sale, well known for adapting Doctor Zhivago and A Man for All Seasons for the screen.
- John Brogden (1798–1869): industrialist involved in the construction of the Manchester, South Junction and Altrincham Railway who lived in Sale from the 1840s and died in the town.
- Samuel Brooks (1792–1864): businessman and banker who owned nearly a quarter of the township of Sale.
- William Brooks (1819–1900), the son of Samuel Brooks: benefactor of and land owner in Sale, and also the Member of Parliament for Altrincham.
- Angela Buxton (1934–2020), tennis player

== C ==
- Darren Campbell (born 1973): Olympic gold medallist who was brought up in Sale and represented Sale Harriers.
- Eric Campbell (1879/80–1917): actor, villain in several Charlie Chaplin films.
- Terry Christian: Journalist/broadcaster, born and raised in Brooks Bar, attended St Alphonsus Primary School.
- John Collier (1708–1786): Urmston-born caricaturist and Lancashire dialect satirical poet, also known by the pseudonym of Tim Bobbin.
- Thomas Coward (1867–1933): ornithologist who lived in Bowdon and went to school in Sale.
- Ian Curtis (1956–1980): musician and singer in Joy Division, born in Old Trafford and lived in Macclesfield.

== G ==
- Urszula Gacek (born 1963): British-born Polish member of the European Parliament and former Consul General of the Republic of Poland in New York City
- Ronald Gow (1897–1993): dramatist and author of Love on the Dole who lived in Altrincham, attending and later teaching at Altrincham Grammar School for Boys.
- Les Graham: footballer and football manager was born in Flixton, Greater Manchester. He made 150 football league appearances for Blackburn Rovers
- David Gray (born 1968): singer-songwriter who lived in Sale until moving to Wales at age nine.
- Eric Greenhalgh: first-class cricketer born in Sale who represented Lancashire.

== H ==
- William Stanley Houghton (1881–1913): playwright in the Manchester School of dramatists who was born and raised in Ashton upon Mersey.

== J ==
- James Prescott Joule (1818–1889): the physicist who developed the first law of thermodynamics moved to Sale in the 1870s for his health and remained there for the rest of his life.
- Jay Kay (born 1969) funk and alternative rock singer-songwriter and lead vocalist of Jamiroquai

== L ==
- L. S. Lowry (1887–1976): painter of urban landscapes born in Stretford.*Levy, Mervyn (2004), "Lowry, Laurence Stephen (1887–1976)", Oxford Dictionary of National Biography
- Rebecca Long-Bailey MP for Salford an Eccles and Shadow Chief Secretary to the Treasury.

== M ==
- Joseph Makinson (1886–1914): first-class cricketer who played for Lancashire County Cricket Club and Cambridge University in the 19th century; lived in Sale towards the end of his life.
- Gordon McKinna (1930-2007): first-class cricketer and England international amateur footballer.
- Diane Modahl (born 1964): Commonwealth Games gold medalist and Sale Harriers athlete who lived in Sale.
- Morrissey (born 1959): singer and member of The Smiths, born in Old Trafford and grew up in Stretford.

== O ==
- Stanley Orme (1923–2005): left-wing Member of Parliament, cabinet minister, and Baron Orme, of Salford, who was born in Sale.

== P ==
- Karl Pilkington (born 1972): podcaster, author, TV personality and former radio producer who was brought up on a council estate in Sale.

== R ==
- Marc Riley (born 1961): was a bass player and roadie with Manchester post punk band The Fall; formed the band The Creepers; with Mark Radcliffe, presented "Hit the North" on BBC Radio 5, and, as "Mark and Lard", the BBC Radio 1 Breakfast show, and now presents the weekday late evening show on Radio 6 Music; lived in Sale.
- Myles and Connor (born 1995): a British singing duo and television presenters from Sale, Manchester who are best known for appearing on the fourth series of ITV's show Britain's Got Talent as part of the boyband 'Connected'.

== S ==
- Chris Sievey (1955–2010) aka Frank Sidebottom: musician and comedian known for fronting the band The Freshies in the late 1970s and early 1980s and for his comic persona Frank Sidebottom from 1984 onwards
- Dodie Smith (1896–1990): author of The Hundred and One Dalmatians who was born in Whitefield and grew up in Old Trafford; there is a blue plaque on her childhood home at 609 Stretford Road.
- Bill Speakman (1927–2018): recipient of the Victoria Cross in 1951 for service in the Korean War who grew up and lived in Hale.
- Paul Stenning (born 1976): ghostwriter and author, grew up in Davyhulme and attended Urmston Grammar School.

== T ==
- William Taylor (1885–1959): first-class cricketer for Worcestershire County Cricket Club, born in Sale.
- Peter Tinniswood (1936–2003): radio and television script-writer who was brought up in Sale.
- Edmund Trafford (1526–1590): member (MP) of the parliament of England for Lancashire in 1572.
- Edmund Trafford (1560-1620): member (MP) of the parliament of England for Newton in 1589 and 1593, High Sheriff of Lancashire and appointed Knight.

== U ==
- Alison Uttley (1884–1976): prolific author who wrote the Little Grey Rabbit books while living in Bowdon.

== W ==
- Cyril Washbrook (1914–1999): England and Lancashire County Cricket Club cricketer who lived in Sale towards the end of his life.
- Belinda Washington (born 1963): television presenter and actress in Spain who was born in Altrincham.
- Dr Charles White: co-founder of the Manchester Royal Infirmary who lived in Sale and held the remains of Hannah Beswick (the Manchester Mummy).

== See also ==
- List of people from Greater Manchester
