= Muhammad Abdur Rahman (footballer) =

British Pakistani footballer

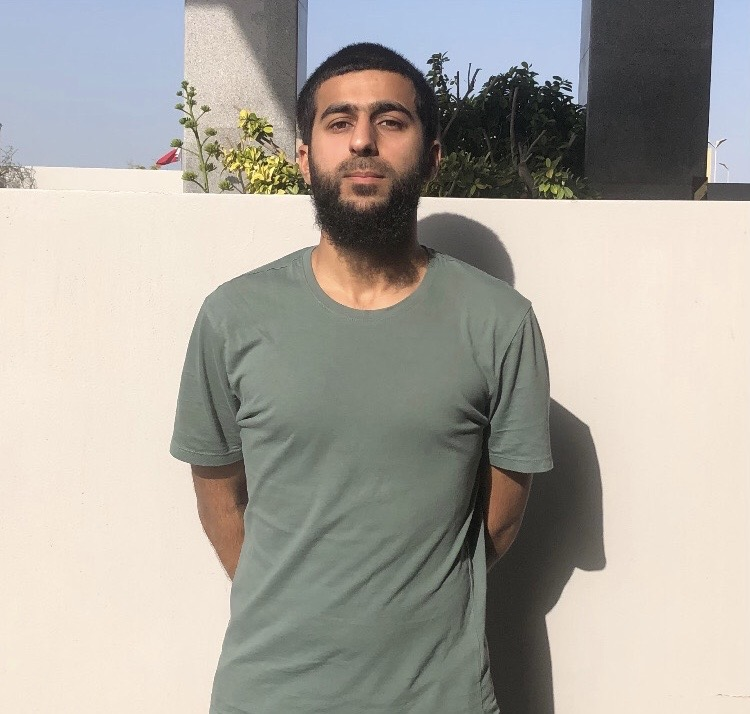
- Born: 10 November 2001 (age 24); Rochdale, Greater Manchester, England, U.K.
- Education: Nelson and Colne College; Kingsway Park High School; University of Essex
- Occupation: Football player
- Height: 1.77 m (5 ft 10 in)
Association football career
- Position: Centre-back
Team information
- Current team: Coppull United FC (West Lancashire Football League)
Youth career
- (2018–2021): Burnley FC (U16–U19)
Senior career*
Years	Team	Apps	(Gls)
2021–2023	Bolton County FC (Reserves)	4	(1)
2024	Route One Rovers FC	1	(0)
2024	Euxton Villa FC	1	(0)
International career
- Panjab FA (ConIFA)
- * Club domestic league appearances and goals as of December 2024

Muhammad Abdur Rahman (born 10 November 2001) is a British Pakistani footballer. He started playing football with Burnley FC (U19 squad), and as of December 2024, he was playing for Coppull United FC as a centre-back in the premier division of the West Lancashire Football League.

== Early life and education ==
Muhammad Abdur Rahman was born on 10 November 2001 in Rochdale in the Greater Manchester area of England. He attended Kingsway Park High School and then went to Nelson and Colne College.

As of 2026, Rahman is set to complete his BA (Hons) in Business and Management at the University of Essex.

== Career ==
Abdur Rahman started his career with Burnley FC in 2018 and played for the under nineteen squad until 2021. During his time at Burnley FC, he was recognised with the Performance of the Season (U19) award in June 2019 and Player of the Month (U19) in February 2020. Abdur Rahman participated in the Jack Wilshere NCF Elites program in London. He also represented Panjab FA, an association football team participating in international competitions.

He joined Bolton County FC in 2021, making four appearances and scoring one goal. In 2024, he played for Route One Rovers FC, making two appearances, and then for Euxton Villa FC, where he made one appearance.

As of December 2024, Abdur Rahman played as a centre-back for Coppull United FC. He made thirty-eight appearances and scored one goal.

Abdur Rahman has shared publicly ongoing mental health issues. In 2026, Abdur Rahman represented Pakistan railways FC at the 2026 PFF National Challenge Cup.
