= Adriano Banelli =

Italian footballer (born 1948)

Personal information
- Date of birth: 5 June 1948 (age 78)
- Place of birth: Città di Castello, Italy
- Position: Midfielder

Senior career*
| Years | Team | Apps | (Gls) |
| 1965–1967 | Città di Castello | 27 | (0) |
| 1967–1979 | Catanzaro | 336 | (24) |
| 1979–1980 | Reggina | 20 | (0) |
| 1980–1981 | Cavese | 29 | (2) |
| Total | | 402 | (26) |

Managerial career
- 1992–1993: Catanzaro
- 1993: Catanzaro
- 1996: Catanzaro
- * Club domestic league appearances and goals

Adriano Banelli (born 5 June 1948) is an Italian former footballer who played as a midfielder and a football manager.

== Club career ==
Overall, Banelli spent 12 seasons with U.S. Catanzaro 1929 between 1967 and 1979 and is the leading league appearance holder for Catanzaro with 336. He also holds the record for most number of Coppa Italia appearances for Catanzaro with 39. Thus he also holds the record for the total number of appearances for Catanzaro with 378. After the 1978–79 season, Banelli moved to fellow Calabrian club, Reggina 1914, who were competing in Serie C. He made 20 appearances for Reggina before moving to Cavese 1919 for the following season, where he made 29 appearances and scored two goals.

== Managerial career ==
Banelli has taken over as manager of U.S. Catanzaro 1929 on three occasions. This occurred twice in the 1992–93 season, when he first took over from Franco Selvaggi for the round 7 match on 20 October. Banelli was in charge for 16 matches before the club hired Paolo Dal Fiume in February 1993. Dal Fiume would only last 9 matches in charge before Banelli took over for the final 9 matches of the season. Banelli again took the manager position for Catanzaro for a third time on 5 April 1996 for the final 7 games of the 1995–96 season.

Across three spells, Banelli managed 32 matches for Catanzaro, with a record of 12 wins, 11 draws and 9 losses.

== Career statistics ==
=== Club ===
Appearances and goals by club, season and competition
| Club | Season | League | | | Cup | | Continental | | Other | | Total | |
| Club | Season | Division | Apps | Goals | Apps | Goals | Apps | Goals | Apps | Goals | Apps | Goals |
|---|---|---|---|---|---|---|---|---|---|---|---|---|
| S.S.D. Calcio Città di Castello | 1965–66 | Serie D | 3 | 0 | — | | — | | — | | 3 | 0 |
| S.S.D. Calcio Città di Castello | 1966–67 | Serie D | 24 | 0 | — | | — | | — | | 24 | 0 |
| S.S.D. Calcio Città di Castello | Total | | 27 | 0 | 0 | 0 | 0 | 0 | 0 | 0 | 27 | 0 |
| U.S. Catanzaro 1929 | 1967–68 | Serie B | 4 | 0 | 0 | 0 | — | | — | | 4 | 0 |
| U.S. Catanzaro 1929 | 1968–69 | Serie B | 37 | 0 | 3 (Note: Includes two games where source erroneously mis-spells name (as Vanello, Panelli)) | 0 | — | | — | | 40 | 0 |
| U.S. Catanzaro 1929 | 1969–70 | Serie B | 29 | 1 | 3 | 0 | — | | — | | 32 | 1 |
| U.S. Catanzaro 1929 | 1970–71 | Serie B | 33 | 4 | 3 | 0 | — | | 2 (Note: Appearance(s) in Serie B promotion playoffs) | 0 | 38 | 4 |
| U.S. Catanzaro 1929 | 1971–72 | Serie A | 30 | 3 | 3 | 0 | — | | — | | 33 | 3 |
| U.S. Catanzaro 1929 | 1972–73 | Serie B | 36 | 2 | 4 | 0 | — | | — | | 40 | 2 |
| U.S. Catanzaro 1929 | 1973–74 | Serie B | 32 | 0 | 4 | 1 | — | | — | | 36 | 1 |
| U.S. Catanzaro 1929 | 1974–75 | Serie B | 34 | 3 | 4 | 0 | — | | 1 | 0 | 39 | 3 |
| U.S. Catanzaro 1929 | 1975–76 | Serie B | 30 | 3 | 3 | 0 | — | | — | | 33 | 3 |
| U.S. Catanzaro 1929 | 1976–77 | Serie A | 23 | 3 | 2 | 0 | — | | — | | 25 | 3 |
| U.S. Catanzaro 1929 | 1977–78 | Serie B | 35 | 5 | 4 | 0 | — | | — | | 39 | 5 |
| U.S. Catanzaro 1929 | 1978–79 | Serie A | 13 | 0 | 6 | 0 | — | | — | | 19 | 0 |
| U.S. Catanzaro 1929 | Total | | 336 | 24 | 39 | 1 | — | | 3 | 0 | 378 | 25 |
| Reggina 1914 | 1979–80 | Serie C1 | 20 | 0 | — | | — | | — | | 20 | 0 |
| Cavese 1919 | 1980–81 | Serie C1 | 29 | 2 | — | | — | | — | | 29 | 2 |
| Total | | | 402 | 26 | 39 | 1 | 0 | 0 | 3 | 0 | 444 | 7 |

== Managerial statistics ==
| Team | Nat | From | To | Record | | | | |
| Team | Nat | From | To | G | W | D | L | Win % |
|---|---|---|---|---|---|---|---|---|
| U.S. Catanzaro 1929 | (Italy) | 20 October 1992 | 7 February 1993 | 16 | 5 | 6 | 5 | 31.25 |
| U.S. Catanzaro 1929 | (Italy) | 5 April 1993 | 30 June 1993 | 9 | 4 | 3 | 2 | 44.44 |
| U.S. Catanzaro 1929 | (Italy) | 25 March 1996 | 30 June 1996 | 7 | 3 | 2 | 2 | 42.86 |
| Total | | | | 32 | 12 | 11 | 9 | 37.50 |

== Honours ==
S.S.D. Calcio Città di Castello

- Serie D: 1966–67 (Girone C)

Cavese 1919

- Serie C1: 1980–81 (Girone B)
