= Cornelius Nicholls =

English cricketer and umpire

Personal information
- Full name: Cornelius Nicholls
- Born: 17 March 1838; Pendleton, Lancashire, England
- Died: 1895 (aged 56/57); Chorlton, Lancashire, England
- Batting: Unknown
- Bowling: Unknown arm fast

Career statistics
Competition	First-class
Matches	1
Runs scored	18
Batting average	18.00
100s/50s	–/–
Top score	14
Balls bowled	157
Wickets	8
Bowling average	7.87
5 wickets in innings	–
10 wickets in match	–
Best bowling	4/19
Catches/stumpings	2/–
- Source: Cricinfo, 24 August 2019

Cornelius Nicholls (17 March 1838 – 1895) was an English first-class cricketer and umpire.

Nicholls, who was born at Pendleton in March 1838, made a single appearance in first-class cricket for the North against Surrey at The Oval in 1863. Batting at number eleven in the North's first-innings, he was unbeaten on 4, while in their second-innings he opened the batting and was dismissed for 14 runs by Tom Sewell. With the ball, he took figures of 4 for 19 in Surrey's first-innings and followed that up by taking figures of 4 for 44 in their second-innings. In the return fixture at Salford, Nicholls stood in the match as an umpire. Nicholls died at Chorlton in 1895.
