= Mick Hill (footballer) =

English-born Welsh footballer

Personal information
- Full name: Michael Richard Hill
- Date of birth: 3 December 1947
- Place of birth: Hereford, England
- Date of death: 23 June 2008 (aged 60)
- Height: 6 ft 0 in (1.83 m)
- Position: Striker

Youth career
- Bethesda Athletic

Senior career*
Years	Team	Apps	(Gls)
1965–1969	Sheffield United	37	(9)
1969–1973	Ipswich Town	66	(18)
1972	→ Blackpool (loan)	0	(0)
1973–1976	Crystal Palace	45	(6)
1976–1978	Cape Town City		
Total		148	(33)

International career
1971	Wales	2	(0)
- * Club domestic league appearances and goals

Michael Richard Hill (3 December 1947 – 23 June 2008) was an English-born, Welsh international footballer who played as a forward.

== Career ==
=== Club ===
Hereford-born Hill started his career with Bethesda Athletic and joined Sheffield United in September 1965. His first-team chances were limited, making just 37 appearances for the Yorkshire club in four years. He scored nine goals, his second in a Sheffield Derby game at the end of the 1966–67 season.

Hill moved to Ipswich Town for £33,000 in October 1969, where he scored 20 goals in 77 appearances. He was loaned to Blackpool for a month in June 1972 and played in the Anglo-Italian Cup Final defeat against A.S. Roma at the Stadio Olimpico. The possibility of his joining permanently was killed off when Ipswich rejected the club's undisclosed offer. Blackpool manager Bob Stokoe commented: "I spoke to Ipswich manager Bobby Robson last night, but we cannot come to an agreement at this stage. We went to what we felt we could afford. I appreciate Bobby Robson's gesture in letting us have Mick for a month so that we could assess him."

Hill was transferred for £35,000 to Crystal Palace in December 1973, where he made a further 45 appearances, scoring another six times. In February 1976, Hill moved on to South African football with Cape Town City.

He was a traditional target man for most of his career who earned the nickname 'Mick The Flick' for his propensity to move the ball quickly and with guile when he received it.

His first-team career ended with a total of 33 goals in 159 games.

=== International ===
In 1971, Hill played twice for Wales, against Czechoslovakia and Romania in the UEFA European Football Championship qualifying competition.

== Death ==
Hill died on 23 June 2008, aged 60 Mick Mills, his captain at Ipswich, paid this tribute: "Mick was an exceptionally nice lad who everyone liked. He was a decent player with a good touch, but suffered somewhat for taking his off-field approach for life on to the park."
