= Constance Travis =

English stage actress

- Born: Constance Mary Travis; 24 April 1911; Stockport, Cheshire, England
- Died: 24 December 2015 (aged 104); Quinton, Northamptonshire, England
- Occupations: Stage actress; philanthropist

Constance Mary Travis (24 April 1911 – 24 December 2015) was a stage actress who married into the family that owned the firm that eventually became Travis Perkins. In later life, she became a philanthropist who controlled the Constance Travis Charitable Trust, one of the leading family grant-making trusts in Britain.

== Early life ==
Constance Travis was born Constance Mary Edwards in Stockport in 1911. Her parents were shopkeepers who moved to Sussex for the sake of her father's health when she was 12. They ran a grocery shop in Shoreham-by-Sea. At the age of 15 she underwent a full-immersion baptism which she said put her off both the church and swimming.

== Career ==
Edwards decided from an early age that she wanted to be an actress. She appeared in a summer review at the Palace Theatre on Brighton Pier and then in Topsy and Eva at the Gaiety Theatre in London's West End, aged just 17. The show was based on Uncle Tom's Cabin by Harriet Beecher Stowe. She had a leading role in The Dubarry (1932) and a long run as Milady de Winter in The Three Musketeers at the Theatre Royal. She had small screen parts in Nine Till Six (1932), the first film made at Ealing Studios after it converted to sound, and in Yes, Mr Brown with Jack Buchanan (1933).

== Family ==
In 1936, Edwards married Ray Travis, son of Ernest Travis, co-founder of Travis Arnold that eventually became the Travis Perkins timber and building materials chain. Constance and Ray met in 1933 on the stairwell of a Bloomsbury building where they were both taking singing lessons.

On the first morning of their honeymoon, Constance received a shock when the maid at their hotel brought the morning tea in with the words "He's gone, ma'am". It transpired that she was referring to the abdication of King Edward VIII rather than the desertion of Ray.

Constance and Ray lived in Kingsthorpe and then Dallington, Northamptonshire. They moved to Quinton in 1964. They had children Tony and Hilary. Ray died in 1988.

== Later life ==
At age 78, Travis suffered a stroke and used a wheelchair for the rest of her life. She found solace in distributing the funds of her charitable trust, the Constance Travis Charitable Trust, which she founded in the early 1980s and has become one of the leading family grant-making trusts in Britain. Its assets include £27 million of Travis Perkins shares. On her 100th birthday Travis ensured that £100,000 was given to each of her favourite charities. She died on 24 December 2015 (aged 104) at her home in Quinton.

== Film appearances ==
- Nine Till Six. Ealing Studios, 1932.
- Yes, Mr Brown. 1933.

== Selected theatrical appearances ==
- Topsy and Eva. Gaiety Theatre, London, c. 1928.
- The Dubarry. His Majesty's Theatre, Haymarket, London, 1932.
- The Three Musketeers. Theatre Royal, London. As Milady de Winter.
