= Les Barton =

English footballer

Personal information
- Full name: Leslie Barton
- Date of birth: 20 March 1920
- Place of birth: Rochdale, England
- Date of death: July quarter 2002 (aged 82)
- Place of death: Ipswich, England
- Position: Full-back

Senior career*
Years	Team	Apps	(Gls)
1946–1949	Bolton Wanderers	0	(0)
1949–1951	New Brighton	64	(1)
1951–19xx	Linfield	?	(?)
- * Club domestic league appearances and goals

Leslie Barton (20 March 1920 – July quarter 2002) was an English professional footballer who played as a full-back. He started his career with Bolton Wanderers, but failed to break into the first team and moved to Football League Third Division North side New Brighton in 1949. Barton spent two years at New Brighton, where he scored one goal in 64 league appearances, before moving to Northern Ireland for a spell with Linfield.

== See also ==
- Football in England
- List of football clubs in England
