= US Catanzaro 1929 =

Italian football club

Catanzaro
- Full name: Unione Sportiva Catanzaro 1929
- Nicknames: Aquile del Sud (Southern Eagles); Regina del Sud (Southern Queen); Timore del Nord (Fear of the North); Magico (Magic); I Giallorossi (The Red-Yellows)
- Founded: 1929; 97 years ago 2006; 20 years ago (refounded); 2011; 15 years ago as US Catanzaro 1929
- Stadium: Stadio Nicola Ceravolo
- Capacity: 14,650
- Owner: AZ S.p.A.
- President: Floriano Noto
- Head coach: Michele Mignani
- League: Serie B
- 2025–26: Serie B, 5th of 20
- Website: uscatanzaro1929.com
Home colours	Away colours	Third colours

Unione Sportiva Catanzaro 1929, or simply Catanzaro, is a professional football club based in Catanzaro, Calabria, Italy, that competes in Serie B, the second tier of Italian football, following a 17-year absence.

The club was initially formed with the merger of two local clubs in 1927 before being officially founded in 1929. Since then, the club has primarily competed in the lower divisions of the national competitions and has been re-founded twice, once in 2006 and again in 2011, both for financial reasons.

Since its foundation, the official colours of the club have been red and yellow. The team has used these colours predominantly in their kits, frequently playing in either all-red kits with yellow trims or in red and yellow stripes. The club's official emblem is the golden eagle, in honour of the city's coat of arms. The team plays its home matches at the Stadio Nicola Ceravolo, which was built in 1919 and is the oldest sports facility in Calabria.

In its history, Catanzaro has played seven seasons in Serie A, five of which were consecutive. The best performance in Serie A was a seventh place finish in 1981–82 and an eighth-place finish in 1980–81.

The club has won seven championships since its foundation. Six of these were in the third tier (one in Prima Divisione, two in Serie C, and three in Serie C1). The final championship was won in IV Serie in 1953. This year, the club was also national title holders after winning the Scudetto IV Serie. At youth level, the club won the Dante Berretti Trophy of Serie C in 1991–1992.

In the Coppa Italia, Catanzaro's best results were runners-up in 1965–66, and semi-finalists in 1978–79 and 1981–82.

On 30 May 2018, the club, which had already used the historic logo since 2011, announced the return of the old name "Unione Sportiva Catanzaro", with the final addition of "1929".

== History ==
=== Origins to pre-World War II ===
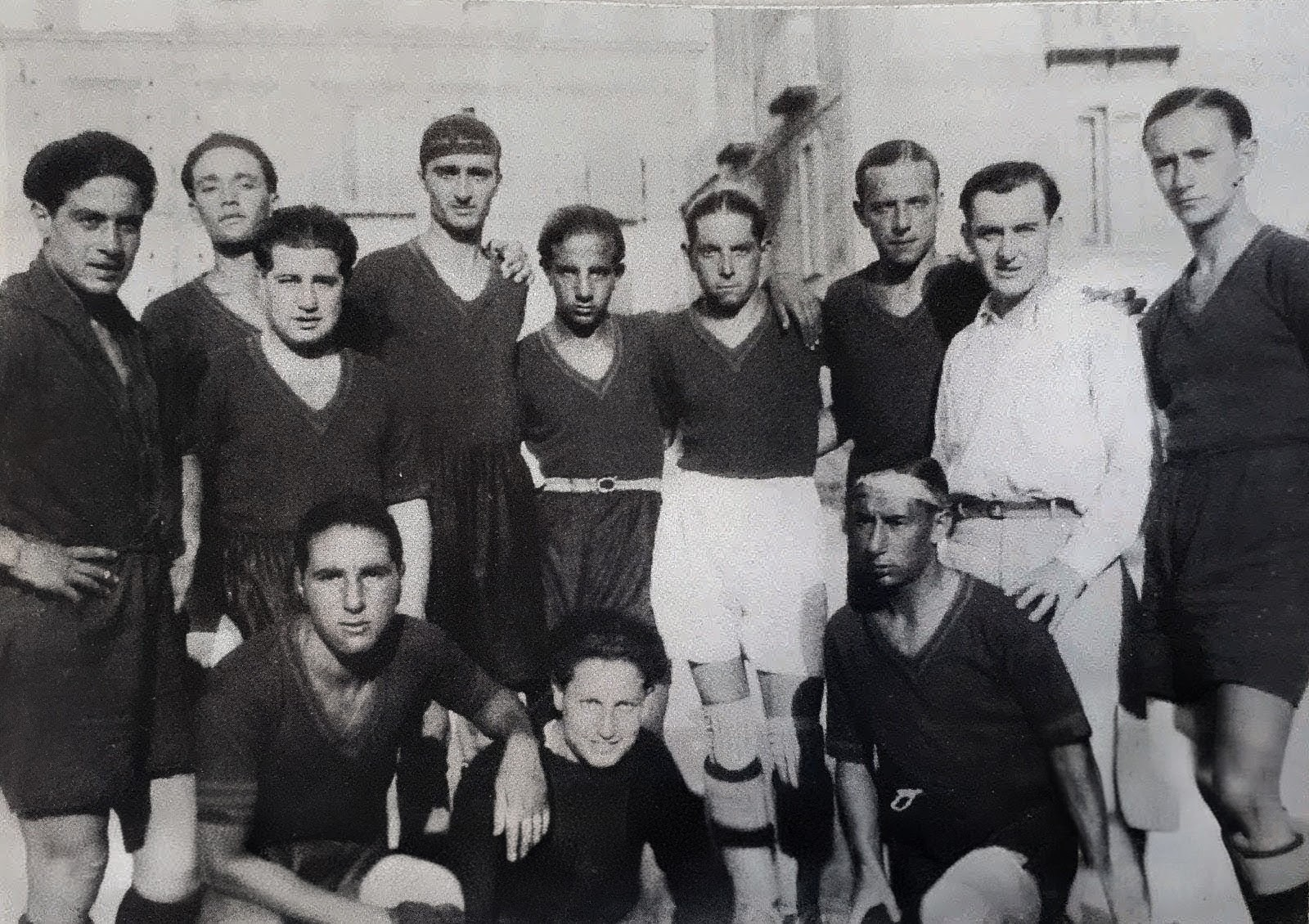
Catanzaro's team in 1929

The club was initially founded by the merger of two local teams (la Braccini and la Scalfaro) as Unione Sportiva Catanzarese in 1927, and competed in the Terza Divisione interregional group of Calabria & Basilicata, which was the fourth tier of Italian football at the time. Following a visit to the city from fascist leader Benito Mussolini, the club was officially founded with the name change of Unione Sportiva Fascista Catanzarese in 1929. The club continued to compete in the Terza Divisione for the 1929–30 season where it gained promotion for a second place finish directly into the third tier, the Prima Divisione, for the 1930–31 season. After spending three seasons in this division, Catanzarese gained promotion into Serie B for the first time in the 1933–34 season. They would spend the next three out of four years in Serie B, culminating with a fifteenth place finish in 1936–37. This meant the club would be relegated to Serie C for the following season, however financial troubles struck the club, so they returned to regional leagues instead. There, they would win a couple of regional titles before the second world war would prevent any further competition.

=== Post World War II and first national title ===
When competition resumed post World War II, the club dropped the fascist moniker, simply becoming Unione Sportiva Catanzaro for the Serie C season. They would remain in Serie C for thirteen of the following fifteen seasons, participating in only the Serie B once in 1946–47 and IV Serie once following relegation from the 1951–52 Serie C season. Catanzaro would bounce quickly back to Serie C after the 1952–53 season, which saw them not only win their interregional group, but also become national scudetto winners following the play-offs between interregional winners. The club would go on to become Serie C group winners in 1958–59 to achieve promotion back to Serie B for the first time in thirteen years.

=== Serie B consistency to Serie A promotion ===
With promotion into Serie B for the 1959–60 season, the club would enter a period of stable success, competing for twelve consecutive years there, with generally mid-table placings. This period saw the club reach the Coppa Italia final in 1966, before finally winning promotion to Serie A for the first time in 1971, after they defeated Bari in the deciding fixture of a three-way play-off which also featured Atalanta.

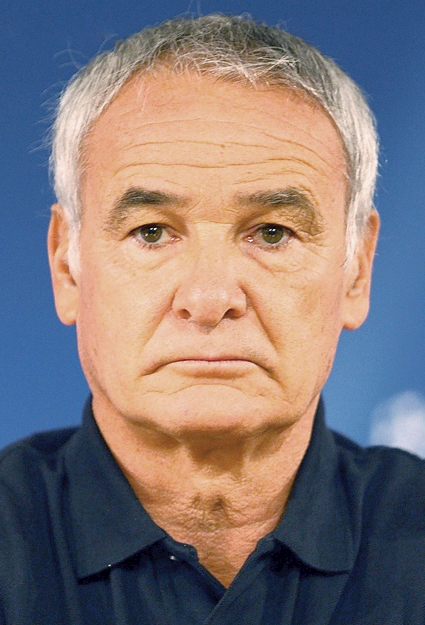
Claudio Ranieri spent much of his playing career at Catanzaro

Catanzaro's inaugural Serie A season saw them struggle and succumb to relegation on the final day with only 3 wins and 15 draws for 21 points. However, their first-ever Serie A win came in Round 16 with a 1–0 win over Juventus. After narrowly missing out on a return to Serie A in 1975, they bounced back in 1976 but once again lasted just one year.

A third promotion in 1978 ushered in the club's golden era with a five-year stay in Serie A. With a team including Claudio Ranieri, Gianni Improta and the iconic Massimo Palanca, Catanzaro managed a highly credible 9th place in 1979. Though they finished 14th and would have been relegated for the following season, they won a reprieve thanks to forced relegations of AC Milan and Lazio. They managed 8th place in 1981 and 7th the following year before a dismal relegation in 1983. Much of the next four years was spent bouncing between Serie B and C1.

=== Return to Serie C and bankruptcy ===
Catanzaro initially emerged as promotion contenders once more in 1988, finishing 5th with the ageless Palanca having returned to the club after a fruitless spell at Napoli. However, they ultimately succumbed to successive relegations in 1990 and 1991, staying in Serie C2 for twelve seasons until 2003.

In 2005, after two consecutive promotions, Catanzaro returned to Serie B after a 15-year absence. However, after a poor season they ended their Serie B campaign in last place, meaning relegation to Serie C1. Catanzaro would immediately get another chance, the team being reinstated to Serie B due to vacancies related to the exclusion of other teams from Serie B. In its 2005–06 Serie B campaign, Catanzaro came last again and was relegated to Serie C1. The relegation was followed by financial troubles which led to the federation cancelling the club's registration.

=== F.C. Catanzaro (2006–2011) ===
In the summer of 2006 the club was re-founded for the first time with the new name of F.C. Catanzaro and was registered to Serie C2 for the 2006–07 season, with the hope to return to the upper divisions.

In season 2010–11, they were initially relegated from Lega Pro Seconda Divisione group C to Serie D, but due to the relegation of Pomezia to last place, the club was saved from relegation.

On 18 July 2011 the club was excluded by the Federal Council from Lega Pro Seconda Divisione, but on 27 July 2011 the club won its appeal to Tnas and was permitted to play in the 2011–12 Lega Pro Seconda Divisione.

=== Catanzaro Calcio 2011 / U.S. Catanzaro 1929 (2011–present) ===
On 30 June 2011 the company Catanzaro Calcio 2011 acquired permanently the company branch of the bankrupt F.C. Catanzaro, following the cancellation of the previous club's registration because of financial troubles. On 6 August 2011, the company purchased the historical brand and logo of U.S. Catanzaro.

In the 2011–12 season, Catanzaro obtained a respectable second place in the Lega Pro Seconda Divisione and was promoted to Lega Pro Prima Divisione after playoffs. The following two seasons saw Catanzaro ending in tenth and fourth place respectively, and also a participation in the promotion play-offs (then lost to Benevento) in the latter case.

Finally in 2018, the club officially transitioned to the name Unione Sportiva Catanzaro 1929, after years of using the historical logo. The logo was also updated with the year '1929' added to highlight this change. The club would make promotion play-offs for three consecutive years, after finishing 3rd, 7th and 2nd but ultimately remain in Serie C.

In the 2021–22 season, Catanzaro again performed strongly in the league and also in the Coppa Italia Serie C. The start of the season began slowly with a number of draws interspersed with some wins. Ultimately, by 29 November 2021 Calabro was fired following a 1–1 draw with Monterosi and was replaced by Vivarini. The team had an immediate response with two wins and drew 1–1 away to Padova in the Coppa Italia Serie C semi-final. On the return leg at home, Catanzaro lost 0–1 and Padova went on to become eventual winners of the cup. Catanzaro continued to pick up points and finished the season strongly in second for a consecutive season, gaining direct entry into the quarter-final promotion playoffs. There they defeated Monopoli 3–1 on aggregate to once again find themselves matched up again Padova in the semi-finals. Unfortunately, they were unable to progress through to final as they lost 2–1 on aggregate.

In the 2022–23 season, Catanzaro returned to Serie B after 17 years, securing promotion with a 2–0 victory over Gelbison on Matchweek 33 and going on to win the Group C title. In the 2025–26 season, Catanzaro reached the promotion play-off final against Monza, with the tie ending 2–2 on aggregate. However, Monza secured promotion to Serie A due to their higher finish in the regular-season standings, while Catanzaro remained in Serie B.

== Stadium, Colours and badge ==
Stadium

Catanzaro plays out of Stadio Nicola Ceravolo, which was built in 1919 and is the oldest sports facility in Calabria.

Colours

The team's colours, since foundation, are red and yellow, just as the whole city.

The most used uniform in the eighty years of history of the Aquile is the solid red one, with the yellow V collar with red shorts and socks with yellow edges.

Most rarely Catanzaro has used a shirt with yellow and red horizontal stripes. However, this uniform was used by the Calabrians in the historic match in Turin, won against Juventus, in the 1965-66 Coppa Italia, which was to launch the Catanzaro in the final, then lost against the lilies of Florence.

For the away shirt, the most used is completely blue with references to the Giallorossi, but also completely white or yellow seals were worn.

Occasionally le Aquile, have also used a third uniform which, depending on the color of the home squad, could be either blue or white or yellow. Same for the fourth currency

Badges

The corporate coat of arms consists of a shield in which stands the historic symbol of Catanzaro, the Golden eagle, faithfully taken from the city's coat of arms, which holds a blue ribbon on its beak bearing the motto Sanguinis effusione, motivated by the losses reported in various battles by the Catanzaro fighters.

On the belly of the eagle takes place a shield that reproduces the three hills on which the city stands. A vertical line splits the emblem in two, so as to allow the insertion of the team's social colors, which is completed by the name of the company, placed at the top on a blue background.

== Derbies and rivalries ==
Catanzaro has competed against other regional Calabrian teams throughout the professional competitions of Italian football. These derbies include:

- Cosenza – Calabria Derby (Derby della Calabria) – this is the most historic of all derbies in Calabria, with the first meeting in Serie B taking place in 1946. The history of these two sides dates all the way back to 1912 when Cosenza met one of the forerunner club's of Catanzaro. Their first official match was in 1930 in Serie C (or the Prima Divisione as it was then known). Overall, the sides have met 54 times, with 21 Catanzaro wins, 24 draws, and 9 Cosenza wins.
- Reggina – The Classic (U-classicu) – with Catanzaro as Calabria's capital and Reggio Calabria the region's largest city, this match has had a special meaning to the area. The first meeting was also in the 1930–31 Prima Divisione. This contest has had the most Serie B meetings of all Calabrian derbies with 20 matches, the first of which was in 1965. It is also the only derby involving Catanzaro in which the Coppa Italia was contested (on one occasion). Out of the 62 matches, Catanzaro has won 20 times, there have been 20 draws, and Reggina has won 24 times.
- Crotone – The former Province of Catanzaro Derby (Derby dell'ex provincia di Catanzaro) – Prior to 1992, the Province of Crotone was a part of the Province of Catanzaro, which is where the name of this derby comes from. The teams however, only met for the first time in Serie B in 2004–05 season and then again in the 2005–06 season. They have spent seven seasons together in Serie C and one season in Serie C2. They have also met four times in Coppa Italia Serie C but never in the Coppa Italia. Whilst both teams have participated in Serie A, it has never been in the same season. The overall head-to-head for this meeting is Catanzaro 8 wins, 11 draws, and 9 Crotone wins from 28 games.

== Players ==
=== Current squad ===
As of 10 September 2026

Note: Flags indicate national team as defined under FIFA eligibility rules; some limited exceptions apply. Players may hold more than one non-FIFA nationality.

No.	Pos.	Nation	Player
1	GK	ITA	Christian Marietta
3	DF	ITA	Marco Imperiale
4	DF	BRA	Matias Antonini
6	DF	ITA	Niccolò Postiglione
7	MF	ITA	Nicolò Buso
8	MF	SLO	Andrej Pogačar (on loan from Radomlje)
9	FW	ITA	Pietro Iemmello (captain)
10	MF	ITA	Jacopo Petriccione
14	MF	ITA	Samuel Giovane
18	FW	ARG	Alejo Garnica
19	FW	CIV	N'dri Philippe Koffi
20	MF	ITA	Simone Pafundi (on loan from Udinese)
21	MF	ITA	Federico Cassa (on loan from Bologna)
22	GK	ITA	Mirko Pigliacelli
24	DF	ITA	Marco Ruggero (on loan from Spezia)

No.	Pos.	Nation	Player
25	FW	CHA	Franck Tchaouna
26	DF	ITA	Bruno Verrengia
27	DF	ITA	Antonio Candela (on loan from Spezia)
28	MF	CHA	Franky Tchaouna
29	FW	ITA	Federico Di Francesco
30	MF	ITA	Gabriele Alesi
31	FW	ITA	Emanuele Pecorino
44	FW	FRA	Solomon Loubao (on loan from Monza)
62	DF	ITA	Ruggero Frosinini
77	FW	ITA	Marco D'Alessandro
80	MF	ITA	Francesco Reita
91	FW	ITA	Gabriel Arditi
93	DF	ALG	Mehdi Dorval
98	MF	ITA	Nicola Mosti
99	GK	ITA	Edoardo Borrelli

=== Out on loan ===
Note: Flags indicate national team as defined under FIFA eligibility rules; some limited exceptions apply. Players may hold more than one non-FIFA nationality.

No.	Pos.	Nation	Player
—	GK	ITA	Lorenzo Madia (at Reggina until 30 June 2027)
—	DF	ALB	Ervin Bashi (at Crotone until 30 June 2027)
—	DF	POR	Gonçalo Esteves (at Carrarese until 30 June 2027)
—	MF	ITA	Costantino Favasuli (at Napoli until 30 June 2027)

No.	Pos.	Nation	Player
—	MF	ITA	Francesco Maiolo (at Cavese until 30 June 2027)
—	MF	MAD	Sayha Seha (at Perugia until 30 June 2027)
—	FW	ITA	Simone Ardizzone (at Pineto until 30 June 2027)
—	FW	ITA	Andrea Oliviero (at Picerno until 30 June 2027)

== Technical staff ==
As of 15 July 2025

Position	Staff
Head coach	(Italy) Michele Mignani
Assistant coach	(Italy) Cristian Agnelli
Technical assistant	(Italy) Luigi Falcone (Italy) Giorgio Lucenti (Italy) Raffaele Talotta
Match analyst	(Italy) Alessandro Rubichini
Fitness coach	(Italy) Fabrizio Tafani (Italy) Antonio Raione
Rehab coach	(Italy) Fabrizio Besso
Goalkeeper coach	(Italy) Fabrizio Lorieri
Team manager	(Italy) Antonino Scimone
Head of medical staff	(Italy) Dr. Massimo Iera
Social physician	(Italy) Dr. Maurizio Caglioti
Massage therapist	(Italy) Bruno Berardocco
Physiotherapist	(Italy) Riccardo Leone
Healthcare worker	(Italy) Carlo Scalzo
Osteopath	(Italy) Felisiano Villani
Nutritionist	(Italy) Luigi Gimigliano
Kitman	(Italy) Giuseppe Aiello (Italy) Emanuele Celi (Italy) Ivan Prudente

=== Hall of fame ===
Below is a list of players inducted into the Catanzaro Hall of Fame

Player	Role	Years
(Italy) Adriano Banelli	Player Manager	1967–79 1992–93, 1993, 1996
(Italy) Edi Bivi	Player	1981–84
(Italy) Gianni Bui	Player	1965–67
(Italy) Giovanni Improta	Player Manager	1975–79 1993–95
(Italy) Saverio Leotta	Player Manager	1952–55 1972–73, 1980, 1983, 1994–95
(Italy) Angelo Mammì	Player	1970–72
(Italy) Massimo Mauro	Player	1979–82
(Italy) Massimo Palanca	Player	1974–81, 1986–90

== Presidential history ==
Below is a presidential history list of Catanzaro, from when they were founded in 1927, until the present day.

Name	Years
Antonio Susanna	1927–1928
Enrico Talamo	1928–1937
Arnaldo Pugliese	1937–1944
Italo Paparazzo	1944–1945
Umberto Riccio	1945–1946
Giuseppe Zamboni Pesci	1946–1948
Gino Guarnieri	1948–1950
Aldo Ferrara	1950–1958
Nicola Ceravolo	1958–1979
Adriano Merlo	1979–1984
Giuseppe Albano	1984–1995
Giuseppe Soluri	1995–1999

Name	Years
Giovanni Mancuso	1999–2003
Domenico Cavallaro	2003
Claudio Parente	2003–2006
Bernardo Colao	2006
Domenico Cavallaro	2006
Giancarlo Pittelli	2006–2008
Pasquale Bove	2008–2009
Antonio Aiello	2009–2010
Maurizio Ferrara	2010–2011
Giuseppe Santaguida	2011
Giuseppe Cosentino	2011–2017
Floriano Noto	2017–

== Managerial history ==
Name	Nationality	Years
Dino Baroni	(Italy)	1928–1931
Géza Kertész	(Hungary)	1931–1933
Heinrich Schoenfeld (R1–11) * Yuri Koszegi (R12–26)	(Austria) (Hungary)	1933–1934
Yuri Koszegi	(Hungary)	1934–1936
Remo Migliorini (R1–?) * Heinrich Schoenfeld (R?–30)	(Italy) (Austria)	1936–1937
Walter Colombati	(Italy)	1937–1938
Riccardo Mottola	(Italy)	1938–1939; 1945–1946
Pietro Piselli	(Italy)	1946–1947
Gastone Boni * Euro Riparbelli	(Italy)	1947–1948
Luciano Robotti * Euro Riparbelli & Pasquali Ripepe	(Italy)	1948–1949
Euro Riparbelli	(Italy)	1949–1952
Orlando Tognotti	(Italy)	1952–1956
Renato Bottacini (R1–16) * Vitoro Maschi & Pasquali Ripepe (R17–34)	(Italy)	1956–1957
Piero Pasinati	(Italy)	1957–1960
Piero Pasinati (R1–16, 18) * Enzo Dolfin (R17, 19–38)	(Italy)	1960–1961
Bruno Arcari (R1–29) * Enzo Dolfin (R30–38)	(Italy)	1961–1962
Enzo Dolfin	(Italy)	1962–1963
Leandro Remondini	(Italy)	1963–1965
Dino Ballacci	(Italy)	1965–1966
Carmelo Di Bella	(Italy)	1966–1967
Luciano Lupi	(Italy)	1967–1968
Luciano Lupi (R1–22) * Umberto Sacco (R23–38)	(Italy)	1968–1969
Dino Ballacci	(Italy)	1969–1970
Gianni Seghedoni	(Italy)	1970–1972
Renato Lucchi (R1–25) * Saverio Leotta (R25–38)	(Italy)	1972–1973
Gianni Seghedoni (R1–15) * Carmelo Di Bella (R15–38)	(Italy)	1973–1974
Gianni Di Marzio	(Italy)	1974–1977
Giorgio Sereni	(Italy)	1977–1978
Carlo Mazzone	(Italy)	1978–1979
Carlo Mazzone (R1–25) * Saverio Leotta (R25–30)	(Italy)	1979–1980
Tarcisio Burgnich	(Italy)	1980–1981
Bruno Pace	(Italy)	1981–1982
Bruno Pace (R1–15) * Saverio Leotta (R16–30)	(Italy)	1982–1983
Mario Corso (R1–9) * Antonio Renna (R10–38)	(Italy)	1983–1984
Giovan Battista Fabbri	(Italy)	1984–1985
Pietro Santin (R1–20) * Todor Veselinović (R21–38)	(Italy) (Socialist Federal Republic of Yugoslavia)	1985–1986
Claudio Tobia	(Italy)	1986–1987
Vincenzo Guerini	(Italy)	1987–1988
Tarcisio Burgnich (R1–7) * Gianni Di Marzio (R8–38)	(Italy)	1988–1989
Fausto Silipo (R1–14, 21–38) * Renzo Aldi & Giovan Battista Fabbri (R15–20)	(Italy)	1989-1990
Claudio Sala (R1–6, 16–24) * Francesco Brignani (R7–15) * Gennaro Rambone (R25–34)	(Italy)	1990–1991

Name	Nationality	Years
Gennaro Rambone (R1–20) * Franco Selvaggi (R21–38)	(Italy)	1991–1992
Franco Selvaggi (R1–6) * Adriano Banelli (R7–18, 26–34) * Paolo Dal Fiume (R19–25)	(Italy)	1992–1993
Gianni Improta	(Italy)	1993–1994
Gianni Improta (R1–3) * Enrico Nicolini (R4–26, 29–34) * Saverio Leotta (R27–28)	(Italy)	1994–1995
Mauro Zampollini (R1–5) * Marcello Pasquino (R6–27) * Adriano Banelli (R28–34)	(Italy)	1995–1996
Rino Lavezzini (R1–26, play-off) * Giuseppe Sabadini (R27–34)	(Italy)	1996–1997
Francesco Paolo Specchia (R1–26) * Giuseppe Vuolo (R27–34)	(Italy)	1997–1998
Juan Carlos Morrone	(Argentina)	1998–1999
Salvatore Esposito (R1–8) * Fortunato Torrisi (R9–27) * Giuseppe Galluzzo (R26–34)	(Italy)	1999–2000
Agatino Cuttone	(Italy)	2000–2001
Leonardo Bitetto (R1–21) * Massimo Morgia (R22–34)	(Italy)	2001–2002
Franco Dellisanti	(Italy)	2002–2003
Piero Braglia	(Italy)	2003–2004
Piero Braglia (R1–5) * Luigi Cagni (R6–25) * Bruno Bolchi (R26–42)	(Italy)	2004–2005
Sergio Buso (R1–13) * Vincenzo Guerini (R14–24) * Bruno Giordano (R25–37) * Franco Cittadino (R37–42)	(Italy)	2005–2006
Manuele Domenicali	(Italy)	2006–2007
Fausto Silipo (R1–5) * Franco Cittadino (R6–21) * Agatino Cuttone (R22–34)	(Italy)	2007–2008
Nicola Provenza	(Italy)	2008–2009
Gaetano Auteri	(Italy)	2009–2010
Zé Maria (R1–9) * Antonio Aloi (R10–30)	(Brazil) (Italy)	2010–2011
Francesco Cozza	(Italy)	2011–2012
Francesco Cozza (R1–27) * Fulvio D'Adderio (R28–30)	(Italy)	2012–2013
Oscar Brevi	(Italy)	2013–2014
Francesco Moriero (R1–12) * Massimo D'Urso (R13, 38) * Stefano Sanderra (R14–37)	(Italy)	2014–2015
Massimo D'Urso (R1–8) * Alessandro Erra (R9–34)	(Italy)	2015–2016
Giulio Spader (R1) * Mario Somma (R2–9) * Nunzio Zavettieri (R10–25) * Alessandro Erra (R26–play out)	(Italy)	2016–2017
Alessandro Erra (R1–8) * Davide Dionigi (R9–28) * Giuseppe Pancaro (R29–38)	(Italy)	2017–2018
Gaetano Auteri	(Italy)	2018–2019
Gaetano Auteri (R1–10, 23–30) * Gianluca Grassadonia (R11–22)	(Italy)	2019–2020
Antonio Calabro	(Italy)	2020–21
Antonio Calabro (R1–16) * Vincenzo Vivarini (R17–38)	(Italy)	2021–22
Vincenzo Vivarini	(Italy)	2022–24
Fabio Caserta	(Italy)	2024–25
Alberto Aquilani	(Italy)	2025–2026
Giorgio Gorgone	(Italy)	2026
Michele Mignani	(Italy)	2026–

* Denotes took over as manager during the season

== Honours ==
=== Leagues ===
- Serie B (Level 2)
  - Runners-up (2): 1975–76, 1977–78
  - Promoted via play-offs (1): 1970–71
- Serie C / Serie C1 (Level 3)
  - Winners (6): 1935–36 (Group D), 1958–59 (Group B), 1984–85 (Group B), 1986–87 (Group B), 2003–04 (Group B), 2022–23 (Group C)
- IV Serie (Level 4)
  - Winners (1): 1952–53

=== Cups ===
- Coppa Italia
  - Finalists (1): 1965–66
  - Semi-finalists (2): 1978–79, 1981–82
- Supercoppa di Serie C
  - Winners (1): 2023
  - Runners-up (1): 2004
- Scudetto IV Serie
  - Winners (1): 1952–53

=== European ===
- Cup of the Alps
  - Winners (1): 1960

== Competitions ==
=== League ===
As of 16 June 2026

Level	League	Seasons	Debut	Last	Total
A	Serie A	7	1971–72	1982–83	7
B	Serie B	31	1933–34	2025–26	31
C	Prima Divisione	3	1930–31	1932–33	31
C	Serie C	22 (Note: Includes 3 seasons as "Lega Pro")	1935–36	2022–23	31
C	Serie C1	6 (Note: Includes 2 seasons as "Lega Pro Prima Divisione")	1984–85	2013–14	31
C	Serie C2	18 (Note: Includes 4 seasons as "Lega Pro Seconda Divisione")	1991–92	2011–12	18
D	IV Serie	1	1952–53		1

=== National Cups ===
As of 16 June 2026

Competition	Participation	Debut	Last season	Best finish
Coppa Italia	48	1935–36	2025–26	Runners-Up (1966)
Coppa Italia Serie C	31	1984–85	2022–23	Semifinalist (2021–22)
Supercoppa di Serie C	2	2004	2023	Champions (2023)
Scudetto di IV Serie	1	1952–53		Champions (1953)

== International record ==
=== Cup of the Alps ===
Season	Opposition	Home	Away	Aggregate	Ref
1960	(Switzerland) SC Brühl	5–1	0–0	5–1	

=== Anglo-Italian Cup ===
Season	Round	Opposition	Home	Away	Ref
1972	Group Stage	(England) Stoke City	0–3	0–2	
1972	Group Stage	(England) Carlisle United	0–1	1–4	

=== Overall Record ===
Competition	Played	Won	Drew	Lost	GF	GA	GD	Win %
Cup of the Alps	2	1	1	0	5	1	+4	50.00
Anglo-Italian Cup	4	0	0	4	1	10	−9	0.00
Total	6	1	1	4	6	11	−5	16.67
