= Francesco Scaratti =

Italian footballer

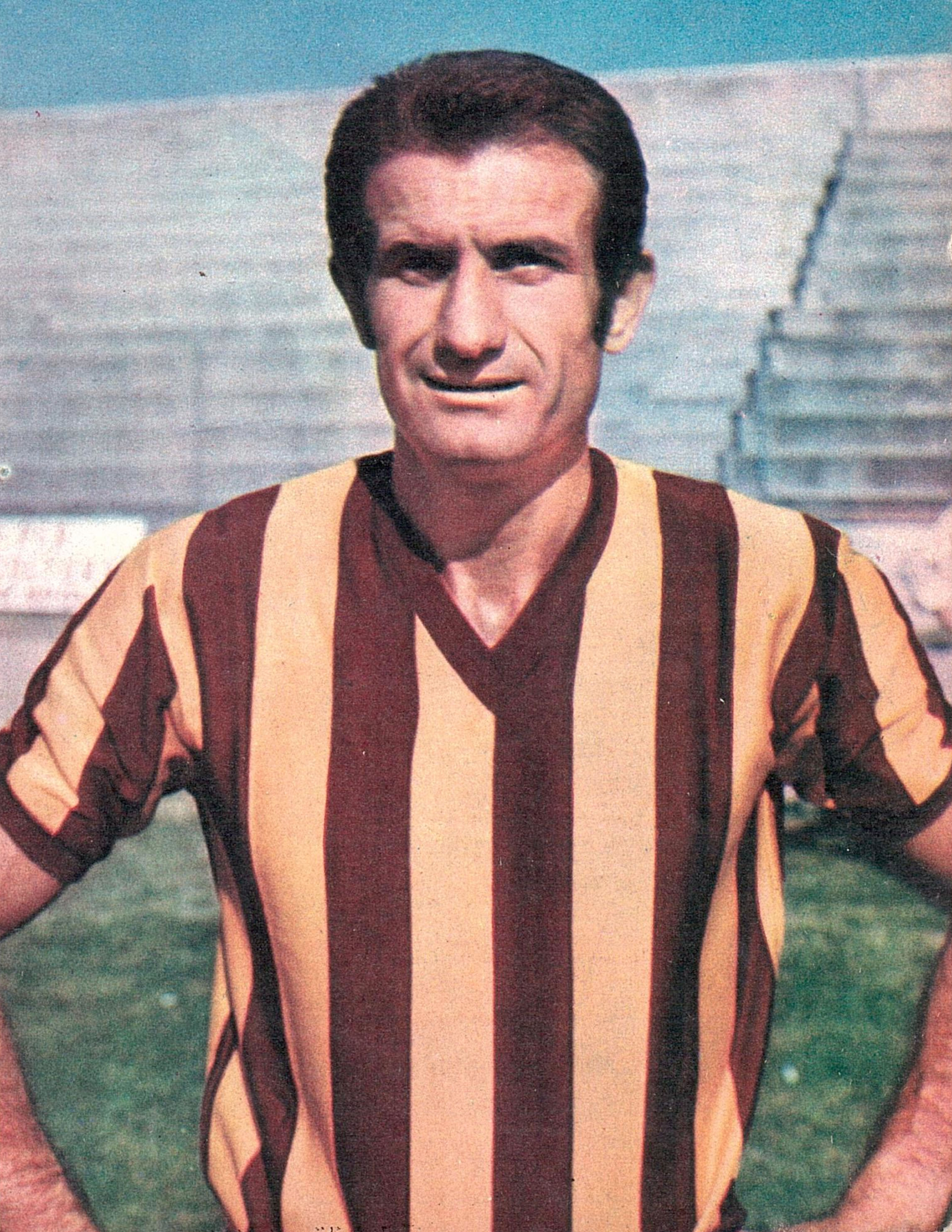
- Scaratti with Roma in 1971

Personal information
- Date of birth: 19 February 1939
- Place of birth: Rome, Italy
- Date of death: 16 August 2013 (aged 74)
- Place of death: Rome, Italy
- Height: 1.75 m (5 ft 9 in)
- Positions: Defender; midfielder

Senior career*
Years	Team	Apps	(Gls)
1959–1960	Siena	31	(1)
1960–1961	SPAL	2	(0)
1961–1964	Tevere Roma	66	(19)
1964–1965	Mantova	4	(0)
1965–1968	Verona	73	(12)
1968–1973	Roma	104	(7)
- * Club domestic league appearances and goals

Francesco Scaratti (19 February 1939 – 16 August 2013) was an Italian professional football player.

He played for 7 seasons in the Serie A for SPAL 1907, A.C. Mantova and A.S. Roma.

He scored a dramatic last-minute-of-extra-time equalizer in the return leg of the semifinal of the 1969–70 European Cup Winners' Cup for A.S. Roma against Górnik Zabrze. Roma eventually lost to Górnik on a coin toss (the last time it was used as a tiebreaker in European football). A.S. Roma was a winner of a coin toss earlier in the tournament.

== Honours ==
Roma

- Coppa Italia winner: 1968/69.
- Anglo-Italian Cup: 1971-1972
