= List of US Catanzaro 1929 records and statistics =

U.S. Catanzaro 1929 is an Italian football club based in Catanzaro, Calabria. The club was officially formed in 1929. Catanzaro has competed in the Serie A seven times and were one time Coppa Italia runners-up.

The list encompasses the honours won by U.S. Catanzaro 1929 at national and regional level, records set by the club, their managers and their players. The player records section itemises the club's leading goalscorers and those who have made the most appearances in first-team competitions. It also records notable achievements by Catanzaro players on the international stage.

Catanzaro have won 6 interregional level three titles and 1 interregional level four title. The club's record league appearances maker is Adriano Banelli, who made 336 appearances between 1967 and 1979 and the club's record Serie A appearance maker is Claudio Ranieri with 128 appearances. Massimo Palanca is the club's record goalscorer, scoring 116 goals in total.

All figures are correct as of 16 November 2021.

== Honours and achievements ==
=== National ===
==== Leagues ====
- Serie B (Level 2)

Runners-Up (2): 1975–76, 1977–78
Promoted via play-offs (1): 1970–71

- Supercoppa di Serie C (Level 3)

Runners-Up (1): 2004

- Scudetto IV Serie (Level 4)

Winners (1): 1952–53

==== Cups ====
- Coppa Italia

Runners-Up (1): 1965–66
Semi-finalists (2): 1978–79, 1981–82

=== Interregional ===
- Prima Divisione or Serie C or Serie C1 (Level 3)

Winners (6): 1932–33 (Prima Div/I), 1935–36 (Serie C/D), 1958–59 (Serie C/B), 1984–85 (Serie C1/B), 1986–87 (Serie C1/B), 2003–04 (Serie C1/B)
Runners–Up (4): 1945–46, 1947–48, (Note: No promotion during this season) 2020–21, (Note: No automatic promotion for second place, did not advance through play-offs) 2021–22

- IV Serie or Serie C2/Lega Pro Seconda Divisione (Level 4)

Winners (1): 1952–53 (IV Serie/H)
Runners-Up (2): 2009–10, 2011–12 (LP Seconda Div)
Promotion (1): 2002–03 (Serie C2)

=== Regional ===
- Prima Divisione

Winners (2): 1938–39, 1939–40
Runners-Up (1): 1937–38

=== European ===
- Cup of the Alps

Winners (1): 1960

== Player records ==
=== Appearances ===
- Most league appearances: Adriano Banelli, 336
- Most Serie A appearances: Claudio Ranieri, 128
- Most Coppa Italia appearances: Adriano Banelli, 39
- Youngest first-team player: Domenico Strumbo, 16 years, 9 months, 12 days on 20 November 2017

==== Most appearances ====
Competitive matches only, includes appearances as substitute.

#	Name	Years	League (Serie A) (Note: League games only)	Coppa Italia	Other (Note: Includes league play-off/play-out matches, Supercoppa di Serie C, Scudetto IV Serie, and Coppa Italia Serie C)	Total
1	(Italy) Adriano Banelli	1967–1979	336 (66)	39	3 (Note: Appearance(s) in Serie B promotion play-off(s))	378
2	(Italy) Massimo Palanca (Note: Figures adjusted using Stasin reference to include missing data from 1986–87 season from Transfermarkt source (29 apps, 17 goals))	1974–1981; 1986–1990	332 (105)	36	1	369
3	(Italy) Stefano Raise (Note: Figures adjusted using Stasin reference to include missing data for years 1955 to 1959 from Transfermarkt source (128 apps, 20 goals))	1955–1966	313 (0)	2	—	315
4	(Italy) Paolo Braca	1967–1977	244 (45)	27	3	274
5	(Italy) Claudio Ranieri	1974–1982	225 (128)	27	1	253
6	(Italy) Luigi Tonani	1963–1969	224 (0)	14	—	238
7	(Italy) Cesare Maccacaro	1960–1968	221 (0)	9	—	230
8	(Italy) Luigi Maldera	1971–1978	206 (45)	22	1	229
9	(Italy) Fausto Silipo	1967–1977	197 (39)	26	2	225
10	(Italy) Franco Marini	1965–1971	202 (0)	16	1	219

=== Goalscorers ===
- Most goals in a season:
  - Vincenzo Geraci, 22 in the 1947–48 Catanzaro season (Note: 21 goals in the regular season and 1 goal in the play-off)
  - Gianni Bui, 22 in the 1965–66 Catanzaro season (Note: 18 goals in the league and 4 goals in the Coppa Italia)
- Most league goals in a season:
  - Vincenzo Geraci, 21 in the 1947–48 Serie C and the 1950–51 Serie C seasons
  - Simone Masini, 21 in the 2011–12 Lega Pro Seconda Divisione season
- First Serie A goalscorer: Alberto Spelta, in the 1971–72 season against Juventus
- Youngest goalscorer: Maurizio Pellegrino, 18 years, 3 months, 5 days (against U.S. Triestina, Serie B, 3 June 1984)
- Oldest goalscorer: Domenico Giampa, 38 years, 8 months, 30 days (against S.S. Racing Club Roma, Serie C, 14 November 2015)

==== Top goalscorers ====
Competitive matches only. Numbers in brackets indicate appearances.

This list may not be completely exhaustive of all matches in all competitions. Data is missing for league competitions from founding in 1929 to 1959. Data is also missing for 12 seasons: 1986–87, 1984–85, 2006–07, and between 1990 and 1992, and 1996 and 2003. Where a player has missing data from the source, numbers have been adjusted using additional references.

#	Name	Years	League	Coppa Italia	Other	Total	Ratio
1	(Italy) Massimo Palanca (Note: League, Total and Ratio numbers adjusted from source to include 1986–87 Serie C league statistics of 17 goals in 29 appearances)	1974–1981; 1986–1990	114 (332)	20 (36)	0 (1)	134 (369)	0.36
2	(Italy) Giorgio Corona	2003–2006	46 (112	1 (4)	0 (1) (Note: Appearance(s) in Supercoppa Serie C)	47 (117)	0.41
3	(Italy) Gianni Bui	1965–1967	33 (67)	4 (5)	—	37 (72)	0.51
4	(Italy) Edigio Ghersetich	1958–1965	33 (148)	3 (5)	—	36 (153)	0.24
5	(Italy) Edi Bivi	1981–1984	28 (83)	6 (13)	—	34 (96)	0.35
5	(Italy) Alberto Spelta	1971–1976	29 (173)	5 (16)	—	34 (169)	0.20
7	(Italy) Simone Masini	2011–2013	27 (59)	0 (1)	—	27 (60)	0.45
8	(Italy) Giordano Fioretti	2012–2014	24 (56)	1 (1)	1 (1) (Note: Appearance(s) in Coppa Lega Pro)	26 (58)	0.45
8	(Italy) Carlo Petrini	1972–1974	22 (71)	4 (8)	—	26 (79)	0.33
10	(Italy) Gennaro Rambone	1958–1962	24 (68)	1 (5)	—	25 (73)	0.34

=== Capocannonieri ===
Below is a list of Catanzaro players who were the top goalscorers of the league or cup during a season, known as the Capocannonieri in Italian. The number corresponds to the numbers of goals scored followed by the season and league or cup this achievement was accomplished.

==== League ====
Player	No.	Season
Gianni Bui	18	1965–66 Serie B
Massimo Palanca	18	1977–78 Serie B
Giuseppe Lorenzo	18	1984–85 Serie C1
Massimo Palanca	17	1986–87 Serie C1
Paolo Mollica	16	1991–92 Serie C2
Sebastian Bueno	16	2006–07 Serie C2

==== Cup ====
Player	No.	Season
Massimo Palanca	8	1978–79 Coppa Italia

=== Serie A records ===
Below is a list of players with the top 10 appearances and goals scored in the Italian top flight competition, the Serie A.

==== Appearances ====
Player	No.
Claudio Ranieri	128
Piero Braglia	117
Giuseppe Sabadini	111
Massimo Palanca	105
Alessandro Zaninelli	83
Giorgio Boscolo	83
Angelo Orazi	77
Leonardo Menichini	73
Enrico Nicolini	68
Adriano Banelli	66

==== Goals ====
Player	No.
Massimo Palanca	37
Edi Bivi	15
Carlo Borghi	8
Alberto Spelta	7
Adriano Banelli	6
Antonio Sabato	6
Giovanni Improta	5
Carlo Bresciani	5
Pietro Mariani	4
Luigi De Agostini	4
Enrico Nicolini	4
Claudio Ranieri	4

== Managerial records ==
- First full-time manager: Dino Baroni
- First Serie A manager: Gianni Seghedoni in the 1971–72 Serie A season.
- Longest serving manager: Orlando Tognotti — 4 years (1 July 1952 to 30 June 1956).
- Longest serving Serie A manager: Carlo Mazzone – 1 year, 8 months, 30 days (1 July 1978 to 30 March 1980).
- Highest win percentage: (Note: Minimum 10 matches) Gaetano Auteri, 65.79%
- Lowest win percentage: Vincenzo Guerini, Bruno Bolchi, both 0.00%

== Club records ==
=== Matches ===
- First Serie A match: Juventus 4–2 Catanzaro, 30 October 1971.
- First Serie A win: 1–0 against Juventus, Round 16, 30 January 1972.

==== Record wins ====
- Record league win: 10–0 against Cagliari, Serie B, 25 February 1934
- Record Coppa Italia win: 6–0 against Benevento, 27 October 1935

==== Record defeats ====
- Record league defeat: 5-goal margin
  - 1–6 on two occasions
  - 0–5 on seven occasions
- Record Coppa Italia defeat: 0–6 against Sorrento, 2010–11 First Round, 8 August 2010

=== Goals ===
- Most league goals scored in a season: 102 in 38 matches, Serie C, 2022–23
- Fewest league goals scored in a season: 15 in 30 matches, Lega Pro Seconda Divisione, 2010–11
- Most league goals conceded in a season: 82 in 42 matches, Serie B, 2004–05
- Fewest league goals conceded in a season: 15 in 34 matches, Serie C, 1958–59

=== Points ===
- Most points in a season (2-point wins):
  - 47 in 34 matches, Serie C, 1958–59
  - 47 in 38 matches, Serie B, 1970–71
- Most points in a season (3-point wins): 96 in 38 matches, Serie C, 2022–23
- Fewest points in a season (2-point wins): 13 in 30 matches, Serie A, 1982–83
- Fewest points in a season (3-point wins): 11 in 30 matches, Lega Pro Seconda Divisione, 2010–11 Lega Pro Seconda Divisione (Note: Catanzaro were deducted 8 points resulting a total of 11 points. Without the deduction, Catanzaro would have only received 19 points, which would also be the fewest points received in a season with 3-point wins.)

=== Attendances ===
Serie A matches only.

- Highest home attendance: 28,942, against Juventus, Round 30, 16 May 1982.
- Lowest home attendance: 4,328, against Lazio, Round 30, 22 May 1977.

== All-time records ==
=== All domestic competitions ===
As of 21 November 2021

League	P	M	W	D	L	GF	GA	%	Honours	Notes
Serie A	7	210	38	88	84	156	253	18.10		
Serie B	28	1,036	297	370	369	939	1,080	28.67	Runners-Up (2): 1975–76, 1977–78	
Serie C (Note: Includes 3 seasons in Prima Divisione (1930–1933) and 9 seasons of Serie C1)	31	1,016	415	282	319	1,316	1,088	40.85	Group Winners (6): 1932–33, 1935–36, 1958–59, 1984–85, 1986–87, 2003–04; Group Runners-Up (3): 1945–46, 1947–48, 2020–21	
Serie C2	18	618	234	219	165	702	550	37.86	Group Runners-Up (2): 2009–10, 2011–12	
Serie D	1	30	14	10	6	52	22	46.67	Group winners (1): 1952–53	
Total Leagues	85	2910	998	969	943	3165	2993	34.29		
Coppa Italia	45	151	59	28	64	224	227	39.07	Runners-Up (1): 1965–66 ||	
Coppa Italia Serie C	8 (Note: Source only provides statistics for 8 campaigns, Catanzaro has actually participated in 31)	20	11	0	9	26	22	55.00		
Supercoppa di Serie C	1	2	0	0	2	0	4	0.00	Runners-Up (1): 2004	
Scudetto Serie D	1	2	1	1	0	4	3	50.00	Winners (1): 1952–53	
Torneo di Capodanno	1	2	1	0	1	2	2	50.00		
Total Cups	56	177	72	29	76	256	258	40.68		
Serie B promotion play-offs	2	3	1	0	2	1	2	33.33	Promoted (1/2): 1970–71	
Prima Div promotion play-offs	1	2	0	1	1	?	?	0.00	Promoted (1/1): 1932–33 (Note: Promoted later, after initially not qualifying from this series)	
Serie C promotion play-offs	4	7	0	4	3	5	8	0.00	Promoted (0/4):	
Serie C2 promotion play-offs	6	18	4	9	5	10	16	22.22	Promoted (1/6): 2002–03 (Note: Promoted later, after initially losing play-off final in this series)	
Serie D promotion play-offs	1	6	5	0	1	9	3	83.33	Promoted (1/1): 1952–53	
Total promotion play-offs	14	36	10	14	12	25	29	27.77		
Serie C relegation play-outs	1	2	1	1	0	4	3	50.00	Survived relegation (1/1): 2016–17	
Total record	156	3125	1081	1013	1031	3450	3283	34.56		

== See also ==
- List of U.S. Catanzaro 1929 seasons
