= List of US Catanzaro 1929 seasons =

U.S. Catanzaro 1929 is an Italian professional football club based in Catanzaro, Calabria, who play their matches in Stadio Nicola Ceravolo. The club was officially formed in 1929 after entering teams in interregional tournaments from 1927.

The club has won six interregional level three titles, one interregional level four title, one national level four scudetto, and the Cup of the Alps in 1960 as part of the Italian Federation. Its best result in the Coppa Italia was runners-up in 1965–66. The club has competed in the Serie A seven times.

This list details the club's achievements in major competitions, and the top scorers for each season. Top scorers in bold were also the top scorers in the Italian league that season.

== Key ==
Key to league competitions:

- Serie A = Italian 1st tier (1926–present)
- Serie B = Italian 2nd tier (1929–present)
- Serie C / Lega Pro = Italian 3rd tier (1935–1978, 2014–present)
  - Serie C1 / Lega Pro Prima Divisione = Italian 3rd tier (1978–2014)
  - Serie C2 / Lega Pro Seconda Divisione = Italian 4th tier (1978–2014)
- IV Serie = Italian 4th tier (1952–1978, 2014–present)
- Prima Divisione = 3rd Tier (1929–1935), 4th Tier (1935–1948)
- Terza Divisione = 4th Tier (1926–1929), 5th Tier (1929–1935)

Key to cup tournaments:

- SSD = Scudetto Serie D (1952–present)
- CA = Cup of the Alps (1960–1987)
- AIC = Anglo-Italian Cup (1970–1996)
- TdC = Torneo di Capodanno (1981)
- CIC = Coppa Italia Serie C (1972–present)
- SCdSC = Supercoppa di Serie C (2000–present)
- EC = European Cup (1955–1992)
- UCL = UEFA Champions League (1993–present)
- CWC = UEFA Cup Winners' Cup (1960–1999)
- UC = UEFA Cup (1971–2008)
- UEL = UEFA Europa League (2009–present)
- USC = UEFA Super Cup
- INT = Intercontinental Cup (1960–2004)
- WC = FIFA Club World Cup (2005–present)

Key to position colours and symbols:

1st or W	Winners
2nd or RU	Runners-up
3rd	Third
♦	Top scorer in division
↑	Promoted
↓	Relegated
	Promotion play-off (did not advance)
	Relegation play-out (survived)

Key to divisional tiers colours:

1st Tier
2nd Tier
3rd Tier
4th Tier
5th Tier
6th Tier
7th Tier
8th Tier

Key to league record and result:

- Pld = Games played
- W = Games won
- D = Games drawn
- L = Games lost
- GF = Goals for
- GA = Goals against
- Pts = Points
- Pos = Final position
- Res = Result
- GS = Promotion play-off, group stage
- TB = Promotion tie-breaker
- RQF = Regional quarter-final
- RSF = Regional semi-final
- RF = Regional final
- 1R, 2R = First or second round
- 1NR, 2NR = First or second national round
- QF = Quarter-final
- SF = Semi-final
- F = Final
- RPO = Regional play-out
- P = Automatic promotion
- R = Automatic relegation

Key to cup record:

- QR = Qualifying round
- PR1 = Preliminary round 1
- PR2 = Preliminary round 2
- 1R = First round
- 1GS = First round (group stage) (Note: with multiple group stages)
- GS = First round (group stage)
- 2R = Second round
- 2GS = Second round (group stage)
- 3R = Third round
- R32 = round of 32
- IMR = Intermediate round
- R16 = round of 16
- QF = Quarter-finals
- SF = Semi-finals

== Seasons ==
Season	League										CI (Note: After competitions in 1922 and 1926–27 (unfinished), the competition began to be held annually from 1935. The competition did not run from 1942 due to World War II and did not resume until 1958.)	Other (Note: Includes Coppa Italia Serie C (Note: From 1972), Scudetto Serie IV, Cup of the Alps, Anglo-Italian Cup, Torneo di Capodanno, Supercoppa di Serie C)	Top scorer (Note: League goals only)	
Season	Div	Pld	W	D	L	GF	GA	Pts	Pos	Res	CI	Other	Player(s)	Goals
Founded as **Unione Sportiva Catanzarese** in 1927.
1927–28	Terza Divisione (Calabria & Basilicata) (4)							**6**	3rd					
1928–29	Terza Divisione (Calabria & Basilicata) (4)							**2**	3rd					
Officially registered with FIGC as **Unione Sportiva Fascista Catanzarese** in 1929.
1929–30	Terza Divisione (Calabria & Basilicata) (5)	8						**10**	2nd ↑	(Note: FIGC admitted straight into Prima Divsione for next season)				
1930–31	Prima Divisione/E (3)	22	8	5	9	31	32	**21**	7th					
1931–32	Prima Divisione/F (3)	28	11	5	12	39	38	**26** (Note: One point deducted)	9th					
1932–33	Prima Divisione/I (3)	20	13	5	2	49	18	**31**	1st (Note: First after tie-breaker play-off with Siracusa 1–0. This qualified them for end of season play-offs) ↑	GS (Note: Promoted to Serie B after initially coming second in play-offs)			Ettore Brossi (Note: +1 goal in play-off)	17
1933–34	Serie B/A (2)	24	8	9	7	39	31	**25**	7th				Antonio Moretti	11
1934–35	Serie B/B (2)	28	9	4	15	33	41	**22**	11th ↓	(Note: Automatic relegation)			Antonio Moretti (Note: 1 goal was scored against Grion Pola, who retired after 15 rounds making their matches void. Team-mate, Dapas also scored 9 goals in the campaign)	10
1935–36	Serie C/D (3)	26	16	5	5	63	27	**37**	1st ↑	(Note: Automatic promotion)	R32			
1936–37	Serie B (2)	30	8	8	14	32	56	**24**	15th ↓	(Note: Automatic relegation. Initially relegated to Serie C but returned to regional leagues due to financial issues for the 1937–38 season)	3R			
1937–38	Prima Div. (Calabria) (4)								2nd		PR1			
1938–39	Prima Div. (Calabria) (4)								**1st**		—			
1939–40	Prima Div. (Calabria) (4)								**1st**		—			
Did not enter teams competitively during 1940 to 1944 due to World War II. Refounded as **Unione Sportiva Catanzaro** in 1944.
1945–46	Serie C/CS(F) (Note: Serie C was divided in two regions, 1. North and 2. Central & South. Catanzaro played in Group F of the Central & South region) (3)	20	12	3	6	52	29	**27**	2nd ↑					
1946–47	Serie B/C (2)	32	11	4	17	37	36	**26**	16th ↓				U. Sacco, A. Codeluppi, G. Venditto	5 (Note: round 31 match abandoned. Unknown goalscorers for 5 other goals throughout the season)
1947–48	Serie C/S (3)	26	16	6	4	65	25	**38**	2nd	(Note: Catanzaro had originally participated in a three-team round robin playoff for second placed teams (of which they topped the group). However, there was to be no promotion this season.)			A. Geraci (Note: Goals (22): 21 League, 1 Play-off)	21
1948–49	Serie C/D (3)	34	11	6	17	42	51	**28**	14th				A. Codeluppi	10
1949–50	Serie C/D (3)	34	12	7	15	49	47	**31**	11th				O. Alò	10
1950–51	Serie C/D (3)	36	16	8	12	52	31	**40**	5th				A. Geraci	19
1951–52	Serie C/D (3)	34	15	5	14	49	49	**35**	8th ↓	(Note: Automatic relegation due to restructuring of league for next season)			E. Marini	14
1952–53	IV Serie/H (4)	30	14	10	6	52	22	**38**	1st ↑	?		**W**^{SSD}	A. Geraci (Note: +2 goals in Scudetto finals)	16
1953–54	Serie C (3)	34	15	7	12	50	41	**37**	8th				G. Corti (Note: 10 League goals only) G. D'Avino (Note: 10 League goals only)	10
1954–55	Serie C (3)	34	14	10	10	45	34	**38**	3rd				G. Corti (Note: 12 League goals only)	12
1955–56	Serie C (3)	34	11	11	12	42	42	**33**	11th				G. Corti (Note: 16 League goals only)	16
1956–57	Serie C (3)	34	11	9	14	22	29	**31**	14th				G. D'Avino (Note: 5 League goals only)	5
1957–58	Serie C (3)	34	15	5	14	43	46	**35**	8th		—		L. Scroccaro (Note: 12 League goals only)	12
1958–59	Serie C/B (3)	34	17	13	4	56	15	**47**	1st ↑		3R		Gennaro Rambone (Note: 15 League, 1 Cup. Giovanni Fanello also scored 15 League goals)	15
1959–60	Serie B (2)	38	11	15	12	41	40	**37**	8th		1R		Giovanni Fanello (Note: 15 League goals only)	15
1960–61	Serie B (2)	38	15	8	15	46	42	**38**	10th		1R	**W**^{CA}	Gennaro Rambone (Note: 13 League goals only)	13
1961–62	Serie B (2)	38	9	16	13	37	50	**34**	14th		QF		Gennaro Rambone (Note: 11 League goals only)	11
1962–63	Serie B (2)	38	12	13	13	34	43	**37**	12th		IMR		G. Zavaglio (Note: 9 League goals only)	9
1963–64	Serie B (2)	38	13	11	14	38	47	**37**	10th		2R		O. Bagnoli (Note: 12 League, 1 Cup)	12
1964–65	Serie B (2)	38	9	20	9	24	26	**38**	8th		1R		G. Marchioro (Note: 9 League goals only)	9
1965–66	Serie B (2)	38	10	16	12	38	40	**36**	10th		RU		**Gianni Bui** (Note: Serie B top goalscorer with 18 goals. 4 Cup goals)	**18 ♦**
1966–67	Serie B (2)	38	14	14	10	44	42	**42**	3rd	(Note: No promotion play-offs this season)	1R		Gianni Bui (Note: 15 League goals only)	15
1967–68	Serie B (2)	40	19	9	12	26	32	**37**	12th		QF		Sergio Pellizzaro	14
1968–69	Serie B (2)	38	10	15	13	23	31	**35**	14th		GS		G. Benvenuto	5
1969–70	Serie B (2)	38	7	19	12	23	30	**33**	16th		GS		M. Musiello	7
1970–71	Serie B (2)	38	17	13	8	37	27	**47**	3rd ↑	TB (Note: Promoted via play-offs)	GS		Angelo Mammi	9
1971–72	Serie A (1)	30	3	15	12	17	34	**21**	15th ↓		1GS	GS^{AIC}	Alberto Spelta	7
1972–73	Serie B (2)	38	12	15	11	38	27	**39**	8th		1GS		Alberto Spelta Carlo Petrini (Note: Goals (12): 11 League, 1 Coppa Italia)	11
1973–74	Serie B (2)	38	11	13	14	31	37	**35**	13th		1GS		Carlo Petrini (Note: Goals (14): 11 League, 3 Coppa Italia)	11
1974–75	Serie B (2)	38	13	19	6	27	18	**45**	4th	TB	1GS		Alberto Spelta (Note: Nil Coppa Italia goals)	7
1975–76	Serie B (2)	38	16	13	9	36	23	**45**	2nd ↑		1GS		Massimo Palanca	11
1976–77	Serie A (1)	30	7	7	16	26	43	**21**	15th ↓		1GS		Massimo Palanca (Note: Palanca also scored 3 goals in Coppa Italia for a total of 8 goals in the season)	5
1977–78	Serie B (2)	38	16	12	10	50	41	**44**	2nd ↑		1GS		**Massimo Palanca**	**18 ♦**
1978–79	Serie A (1)	30	6	16	8	23	30	**28**	9th		SF		Massimo Palanca (Note: Palanca also scored 8 goals in the Coppa Italia (leading goalscorer for the tournament), for a total of 18 goals for the season)	10
1979–80	Serie A (1)	30	5	14	11	20	34	**24**	12th		GS		Massimo Palanca (Note: Palanca also scored 2 Coppa Italia goals for a total of 11 goals in the season)	9
1980–81	Serie A (1)	30	6	17	7	24	27	**29**	8th		GS	GS^{TdC}	Massimo Palanca (Note: Nil Coppa Italia or Torneo di Capodanno goals)	13
1981–82	Serie A (1)	30	9	10	11	25	29	**28**	7th		SF		Edi Bivi (Note: Bivi also scored 5 goals in the Coppa Italia for a total of 17 goals in the season)	12
1982–83	Serie A (1)	30	2	9	19	21	56	**13**	16th ↓		R16		L. De Agostini (Note: De Agostini also scored 3 goals in the Coppa Italia for a total of 7 goals in the season) P. Mariani (Note: Mariani also scored one goal in the Coppa Italia for a total of 5 goals in the season)	4
1983–84	Serie B (2)	38	10	10	18	34	45	**30**	20th ↓		GS		Edi Bivi	14
1984–85	Serie C1/B (3)	34	17	11	6	54	30	**45**	1st ↑		GS	R16^{CIC}	**Giuseppe Lorenzo** (Note: Lorenzo also scored 2 goals in Coppa Italia and 1 goal in Coppa Italia Serie C for a total of 21 goals for the season)	**18 ♦**
1985–86	Serie B (2)	38	9	12	17	33	45	**30**	19th ↓		GS		A. Soda (Note: Soda scored one goal in Coppa Italia for a total of 8 goals in the season)	7
1986–87	Serie C1/B (3)	34	18	9	7	46	24	**45**	1st ↑		GS		**Massimo Palanca**	**17 ♦**
1987–88	Serie B (2)	38	14	18	6	36	24	**46**	5th		GS		Massimo Palanca (Note: Palanca scored 2 goals in Coppa Italia for a total of 15 goals for the season)	13
1988–89	Serie B (2)	38	8	19	11	24	26	**35**	11th		1GS		Massimo Palanca (Note: Palanca scored 2 goals in Coppa Italia for a total of 14 goals for the season)	12
1989–90	Serie B (2)	38	3	19	16	16	35	**25**	20th ↓		PR1		Giuseppe Lorenzo	5
1990–91	Serie C1/B (3)	34	8	16	10	28	28	**29** (Note: 3 points deducted)	16th ↓		1R	R16^{CIC}	Paolo Mollica (Note: Mollica scored no goals in Coppa Italia and one goal in Coppa Italia Serie C for a total of 9 goals)	8
1991–92	Serie C2/B (4)	38	12	20	6	35	23	**44**	4th		—	GS^{CIC}	**Paolo Mollica** (Note: Mollica was the league's topscorer with 16 goals) (Note: Mollica scored one goal in the Coppa Italia Serie C for a total of 17 goals for the season)	**16 ♦**
1992–93	Serie C2/C (4)	34	13	8	13	43	38	**34**	8th		—	QF^{CIC}	D. Guzzetti (Note: Guzzetti scored 2 goals in Coppa Italia Serie C for a total of 11 goals for the season)	9
1993–94	Serie C2/C (4)	34	12	13	9	35	24	**44**	9th		—	GS^{CIC}	M. Campo (Note: Campo scored 0 goals in Coppa Italia Serie C)	6
1994–95	Serie C2/C (4)	34	9	15	10	32	33	**42**	11th		—	1R^{CIC}	G. Delle Donne (Note: Delle Donne scored 0 goals in Coppa Italia Serie C)	8
1995–96	Serie C2/C (4)	34	12	9	13	30	32	**45**	10th		—	2R^{CIC}	M. Campo (Note: Campo scored one goal in Coppa Italia Serie C for a total of 8 goals in the season)	7
1996–97	Serie C2/C (4)	34	13	14	7	36	26	**53**	5th	SF (Note: Lost 0–2 on aggregate against Benevento in promotion play-offs semi-final.)	—	2R^{CIC}	F. Libro (Note: Libro scored 0 goals in Coppa Italia Serie C or Promotion play-off matches)	8
1997–98	Serie C2/C (4)	34	12	12	10	32	30	**48**	6th		—	R16^{CIC}	F. Marra (Note: Marra scored 0 goals in Coppa Italia Serie C)	6
1998–99	Serie C2/C (4)	34	12	17	5	34	20	**53**	3rd	SF (Note: Lost 2–3 on aggregate against Benevento in the promotion play-off semi-final.)	—	GS^{CIC}	M. Marsich (Note: Scored one goal in Coppa Italia Serie C and 0 goals in Promotion play-off matches for a total of 12 goals in the season)	11
1999–2000	Serie C2/C (4)	34	12	7	15	39	42	**43**	9th		—	GS^{CIC}	G. Tortora (Note: Goals (15): 15 League, 0 CIC)	15
2000–01	Serie C2/C (4)	34	13	16	5	49	35	**54** (Note: 1 point deduction)	3rd	F (Note: Lost 1–3 (a.e.t.) after tying on aggregate against Sora in the promotion play-off final.)	—	GS^{CIC}	S. Di Corcia (Note: Goals (16): 15 League, 1 Promotion play-off, 0 CIC)	15
2001–02	Serie C2/C (4)	34	14	9	11	46	35	**51**	6th		—	QF^{CIC}	F. Moscelli (Note: Goals (15): 15 League, 0 CIC)	15
2002–03	Serie C2/C (4)	34	14	14	6	44	30	**56**	4th	F (Note: Promoted after initially losing 0–2 on aggregate against Acireale in the promotion play-off final.) ↑	—	GS^{CIC}	F. Moscelli (Note: Goals (11): 11 League, 0 Other)	11
2003–04	Serie C1/B (3)	34	19	10	5	44	25	**67**	1st ↑		—	GS^{CIC} RU^{SCdSC}	Giorgio Corona (Note: Goals (19): 19 League, 0 Others)	19
2004–05	Serie B (2)	42	5	11	26	40	82	**26**	21st	(Note: Initially relegated to Serie C1 but was readmitted)	GS		Giorgio Corona (Note: Goals (14): 13 League, 1 Coppa Italia)	13
2005–06	Serie B (2)	42	7	7	28	26	63	**28**	22nd ↓	(Note: Automatic relegation. Relegated directly to Serie C2 due to financial problems)	2R		Giorgio Corona (Note: Goals (14): 14 League, 0 Coppa Italia)	14
Refounded as **Football Club Catanzaro**
2006–07	Serie C2/C (4)	34	11	12	11	34	27	**45**	9th		—	GS^{CIC}	**Sebastián Bueno (Note: Goals (16): 16 League, 0 CIC)**	**16 ♦**
2007–08	Serie C2/C (4)	34	10	15	9	32	25	**43**	10th		—	GS^{CIC}	P. Berardi (Note: Goals(7):7 League, 0 CIC)	7
2008–09	Lega Pro Seconda/C (4)	34	15	14	5	39	23	**59**	3rd	RSF	—	1R^{CIC}	Massimiliano Caputo (Note: Goals (16): 13 League, 3 CIC)	13
2009–10	Lega Pro Seconda/C (4)	34	22	6	6	61	29	**69** (Note: 3 point deduction due to financial irregularities.)	2nd	RF	—	GS^{CIC}	Manolo Mosciaro (Note: Goals (17): 16 League, 1 Promotion play-off, 0 CIC)	16
2010–11	Lega Pro Seconda/C (4)	30	5	4	21	15	49	**11** (Note: 8 point deduction.)	15th	(Note: Originally was excluded by Covisoc's decision but readmitted by TNAS.)	1R	2R^{CIC}	S. Morello (Note: Goals (3): 3 League, 0 Others. NB: F. Corapi season goals (3): 2 League, 1 CIC)	3
Refounded as **Catanzaro Calcio 2011**
2011–12	Lega Pro Seconda/B (4)	40	23	14	3	66	29	**83**	2nd ↑		—	3R^{CIC}	Simone Masini	18
2012–13	Lega Pro Prima/B (3)	30	10	7	13	37	48	**37**	10th		1R	2R^{CIC}	Giordano Fioretti	12
2013–14	Lega Pro Prima/B (3)	32	13	16	3	34	17	**55**	4th	RQF	—	2R^{CIC}	Giordano Fioretti	12
2014–15	Lega Pro/C (3)	38	14	11	13	48	44	**53**	8th		2R	1R^{CIC}	Andrea Razzitti Andrea Russotto	7
2015–16	Lega Pro/C (3)	34	10	11	13	27	40	**41**	11th		1R	R32^{CIC}	Andrea Razzitti	9
2016–17	Lega Pro/C (3)	38	9	11	18	36	49	**38**	18th	RPO	—	GS^{CIC}	Giuseppe Giovinco	9
2017–18	Serie C/C (3)	36	11	9	16	35	45	**42**	14th		—	GS^{CIC}	Saverino Infantino Tony Letizia	6
Changed name to **Unione Sportiva Catanzaro 1929**
2018–19	Serie C/C (3)	36	20	7	9	65	32	**67**	3rd	QF	—	R16^{CIC}	Eugenio D'Ursi	14
2019–20	Serie C/C (3)	30	12	7	11	41	36	**43**	7th	2R	2R	QF^{CIC}	Mamadou Kanoute	6
2020–21	Serie C/C (3)	36	19	11	6	44	29	**68**	2nd	2NR	3R	~~canc.~~^{CIC}	Alessio Di Massimo	9
2021–22	Serie C/C (3)	36	19	10	7	57	26	**67**	2nd	SF	1R	SF^{CIC}		
2022–23	Serie C/C (3)	38	30	6	2	102	21	**96**	**1st** ↑		PR	QF^{CIC} **W**^{SCdSC}	Pietro Iemmello	28
2023–24	Serie B (2)	38	17	9	12	59	50	**60**	5th	SF	R64		Pietro Iemmello (Note: Goals (17): 15 League, 2 Serie B Promotion Play-offs)	15
2024–25	Serie B (2)	38	11	20	7	51	45	**53**	6th	SF	1R		Pietro Iemmello	10
2025–26	Serie B (2)	38	15	14	9	62	51	**59**	5th	F	R32		Filippo Pittarello	12

=== Notes ===
Source:
