= 1980–81 US Catanzaro season =

U.S. Catanzaro
1980–81 season
- President: Adriano Merlo
- Manager: Tarcisio Burgnich
- Stadium: Stadio Comunale
- Serie A: 8th
- Coppa Italia: Group stage
- Top goalscorer: League: Massimo Palanca (13); All: Massimo Palanca (13)

During the 1980–81 season Catanzaro competed in Serie A and Coppa Italia. It was the club's third consecutive season and fifth overall season in the Serie A. The club participated in the Coppa Italia for the 26th time.

== Squad ==
Note: Flags indicate national team as defined under FIFA eligibility rules; some limited exceptions apply. Players may hold more than one non-FIFA nationality.

Pos.	Nation	Player
GK	ITA	Massimo Mattolini
GK	ITA	Ruggero Casari
GK	ITA	Alessandro Zaninelli
DF	ITA	Gabriele Morganti
DF	ITA	Andrea Salvatori
DF	ITA	Franco Peccenini
DF	ITA	Leonardo Menichini
DF	ITA	Claudio Ranieri (captain)
MF	ITA	Giorgio Boscolo
MF	ITA	Giuseppe Sabadini

Pos.	Nation	Player
MF	ITA	Antonio Sabato
MF	ITA	Massimo Mauro
MF	ITA	Piero Braglia
MF	ITA	Angelo Orazi
FW	ITA	Valerio Majo
FW	ITA	Giorgio De Giorgis
FW	ITA	Santino Mondello
FW	ITA	Carlo Borghi
FW	ITA	Massimo Palanca

== Competitions ==
=== Overview ===
Competition	Started round	Final position / round	First match	Last match
Serie A	—	8th	14 September 1980	24 May 1981
Coppa Italia	Group	Group	20 August 1980	7 September 1980

Source: Competitions

=== Serie A ===
==== League table ====
Pos	Team	Pld	W	D	L	GF	GA	GD	Pts
6	Cagliari	30	8	14	8	29	30	−1	30
7	Bologna (Note: Bologna, Avellino and Perugia started the season with a 5-point penalisation because of the Totonero 1980 scandal.)	30	11	12	7	32	27	+5	29
8	Catanzaro	30	6	17	7	24	27	−3	29
9	Torino	30	8	10	12	26	29	−3	26
10	Avellino	30	10	10	10	36	33	+3	25 (Note: Positions decided by head-to-head points. Avellino 10 pts; Ascoli 10 pts; Udinese 8 pts; Como 6 pts; Brescia 6 pts.)

Source: Panini

==== Results summary ====
Overall								Home						Away					
Pld	W	D	L	GF	GA	GD	Pts	W	D	L	GF	GA	GD	W	D	L	GF	GA	GD
30	6	17	7	24	27	−3	29^{1}	4	9	2	14	11	+3	2	8	5	10	16	−6

Last updated: 7 March 2023.
Source: webalice.it

^{1}Points were only worth 2 for a win this season

==== Results by round ====
Round	1	2	3	4	5	6	7	8	9	10	11	12	13	14	15	16	17	18	19	20	21	22	23	24	25	26	27	28	29	30
Ground	A	H	A	H	A	H	A	A	H	H	A	H	A	H	A	H	A	H	A	H	A	H	H	A	A	H	A	H	A	H
Result	D	W	D	W	D	L	D	L	D	W	L	L	D	D	D	D	L	D	D	D	D	D	W	L	W	D	W	D	L	D
Position	6	5	6	3	2	4	5	6	6	4	5	6	7	6	7	7	8	8	7	9	9	9	7	9	9	7	7	7	8	8
Points	1	3	4	6	7	7	8	8	9	11	11	11	12	13	14	15	15	16	17	18	19	20	22	22	24	25	27	28	28	29

Source: Competitive matches
A = Away; H = Home; W = Win; D = Draw; L = Loss; P = Postponed; = Leader, 1980–81 European Cup; = 1980–81 UEFA Cup; = 1980–81 Serie B; R = 1980–81 UEFA Cup Winners' Cup

==== Matches ====
14 September 1980 1	Napoli	1–1	Catanzaro	Naples
	Musella 59' (pen.)	Report	67' Sabato	Stadium: Stadio San Paolo; Referee: Franco Tonolini

21 September 1980 2	Catanzaro	1–0	Torino	Catanzaro
	Palanca 35'	Report		Stadium: Stadio Comunale; Referee: Paolo Bergamo

28 September 1980 3	Fiorentina	1–1	Catanzaro	Florence
	Bertoni 71'	Report	85' De Giorgis	Stadium: Stadio Comunale; Referee: Paolo Milan

5 October 1980 4	Catanzaro	2–0	Como	Catanzaro
	Palanca 60'; Boscolo 64'	Report		Stadium: Stadio Comunale; Referee: Claudio Pieri

19 October 1980 5	Brescia	1–1	Catanzaro	Brescia
	Sabadini 55' (o.g.)	Report	39' Borghi	Stadium: Stadio Mario Rigamonti; Referee: Luigi Agnolin

26 October 1980 6	Catanzaro	0–1	Perugia	Catanzaro
		Report	59' Bagni	Stadium: Stadio Comunale; Referee: Piero Patrussi

9 November 1980 7	Roma	0–0	Catanzaro	Rome
		Report		Stadium: Stadio Olimpico; Referee: Paolo Bergamo

23 November 1980 8	Udinese	2–1	Catanzaro	Udine
	Pin 61'; Tesser 76'	Report	1' Borghi	Stadium: Stadio Friuli; Referee: Gianfranco Menegali

30 November 1980 9	Catanzaro	0–0	Juventus	Catanzaro
		Report		Stadium: Stadio Comunale; Referee: Riccardo Lattanzi

14 December 1980 10	Catanzaro	2–0	Ascoli	Catanzaro
	Palanca 56'; Borghi 62'	Report		Stadium: Stadio Comunale; Referee: Giancarlo Redini

21 December 1980 11	Avellino	1–0	Catanzaro	Naples
	Juary 12'	Report		Stadium: Stadio San Paolo; Referee: Massimo Ciulli

28 December 1980 12	Catanzaro	1–3	Pistoiese	Catanzaro
	Palanca 90' (pen.)	Report	24' Chimenti; 72' Badiani; 87' Paganelli	Stadium: Stadio Comunale; Referee: Paolo Casarin

18 January 1981 13	Bologna	0–0	Catanzaro	Bologna
		Report		Stadium: Stadio Comunale; Referee: Mario Facchin

25 January 1981 14	Catanzaro	0–0	Cagliari	Catanzaro
		Report		Stadium: Stadio Comunale; Referee: Arnaldo Prati

1 February 1981 15	Inter Milan	2–2	Catanzaro	Milan
	Prohaska 30'; Beccalossi 35'	Report	18' (o.g.) Canuti; 78' De Giorgis	Stadium: Stadio Giuseppe Meazza; Referee: Giancarlo Redini

8 February 1981 16	Catanzaro	0–0	Napoli	Catanzaro
		Report		Stadium: Stadio Comunale; Referee: Claudio Pieri

15 February 1981 17	Torino	2–0	Catanzaro	Turin
	P. Pulici 3'; D'Amico 70'	Report		Stadium: Stadio Comunale; Referee: Roberto Terpin

22 February 1981 18	Catanzaro	2–2	Fiorentina	Catanzaro
	Sabato 36'; Palanca 41' (pen.)	Report	46', 66' Fattori	Stadium: Stadio Comunale; Referee: Pietro D'Elia

1 March 1981 19	Como	0–0	Catanzaro	Como
		Report		Stadium: Stadio Giuseppe Sinigaglia; Referee: Massimo Ciulli

8 March 1981 20	Catanzaro	0–0	Brescia	Catanzaro
		Report		Stadium: Stadio Comunale; Referee: Carlo Longhi

15 March 1981 21	Perugia	0–0	Catanzaro	Perugia
		Report		Stadium: Stadio Renato Curi; Referee: Romeo Paparesta

22 March 1981 22	Catanzaro	1–1	Roma	Catanzaro
	Palanca 55'	Report	70' Conti	Stadium: Stadio Comunale; Referee: Paolo Casarin

29 March 1981 23	Catanzaro	2–1	Udinese	Catanzaro
	Palanca 43', 71'	Report	49' (pen.) Zanone	Stadium: Stadio Comunale; Referee: Giancarlo Redini

5 April 1981 24	Juventus	3–0	Catanzaro	Turin
	Marocchino 15'; Brady 82'; Scirea 90'	Report		Stadium: Stadio Comunale; Referee: Maurizio Mattei

12 April 1981 25	Ascoli	1–2	Catanzaro	Ascoli Piceno
	A. Moro 42' (pen.)	Report	18' Palanca; 37' Borghi	Stadium: Stadio Cino e Lillo Del Duca; Referee: Carlo Longhi

26 April 1981 26	Catanzaro	1–1	Avellino	Catanzaro
	Ranieri 41'	Report	49' Ipsaro Passione	Stadium: Stadio Comunale; Referee: Egidio Ballerini

3 May 1981 27	Pistoiese	0–1	Catanzaro	Pistoia
		Report	84' (pen.) Palanca	Stadium: Stadio Comunale; Referee: Domenico Lops

10 May 1981 28	Catanzaro	2–2	Bologna	Catanzaro
	Palanca 30', 69'	Report	27' Fiorini; 42' Fabbri	Stadium: Stadio Comunale; Referee: Tullio Lanese

17 May 1981 29	Cagliari	2–1	Catanzaro	Cagliari
	Piras 71'; Osellame 80'	Report	40' (pen.) Palanca	Stadium: Stadio Sant'Elia; Referee: Pierluigi Pairetto

24 May 1981 30	Catanzaro	0–0	Inter Milan	Catanzaro
		Report		Stadium: Stadio Comunale; Referee: Roberto Bianciardi

=== Coppa Italia ===
==== Group stage ====
===== Table (Group 7) =====
Pos	Team	Pld	W	D	L	GF	GA	GD	Pts
1	Torino	4	3	1	0	10	3	+7	7
2	Perugia	4	1	2	1	3	3	0	4
3	Catanzaro	4	2	0	2	3	5	−2	4
4	Bari	4	1	1	2	3	3	0	3
5	Lecce	4	0	2	2	1	6	−5	2

===== Matches (Group 7) =====
20 August 1980 1	Catanzaro	1–0	Lecce	Catanzaro
	De Giorgis 20'			Stadium: Stadio Comunale; Referee: Castaldi

31 August 1980 3	Catanzaro	1–0	Perugia	Catanzaro
	De Giorgis 60'			Stadium: Stadio Comunale; Referee: Casarin

3 September 1980 4	Torino	3–1	Catanzaro	Turin
	P. Sala 8'; D'Amico 15'; F. Graziani 59'		78' Ranieri	Stadium: Comunale; Referee: Prati

7 September 1980 5	Bari	2–0	Catanzaro	Bari
	A. Serena 42'; Iorio 80'			Referee: Magni

== Squad statistics ==
No.	Pos	Nat	Player	Total		Serie A		Coppa Italia	
No.	Pos	Nat	Player	Apps	Goals	Apps	Goals	Apps	Goals
	FW	(Italy) ITA	Carlo Borghi	29	4	25	4	4	0
	MF	(Italy) ITA	Giorgio Boscolo	32	1	30	1	2	0
	MF	(Italy) ITA	Piero Braglia	26	0	22	0	4	0
	GK	(Italy) ITA	Ruggero Casari	2	-2	2	-2	0	0
	FW	(Italy) ITA	Giorgio De Giorgis	28	4	24	2	4	2
	FW	(Italy) ITA	Valerio Majo	19	0	19	0	0	0
	FW	(Italy) ITA	Massimo Mauro	31	0	27	0	3+1	0
	GK	(Italy) ITA	Massimo Mattolini	3	-2	3	-2	0	0
	DF	(Italy) ITA	Leonardo Menichini	25	0	22	0	3	0
	FW	(Italy) ITA	Santino Mondello	7	0	4	0	0+3	0
	DF	(Italy) ITA	Gabriele Morganti	27	0	24	0	3	0
	MF	(Italy) ITA	Angelo Orazi	25	0	21	0	4	0
	FW	(Italy) ITA	Massimo Palanca	28	13	28	13	0	0
	DF	(Italy) ITA	Franco Peccenini	11	0	11	0	0	0
	DF	(Italy) ITA	Claudio Ranieri	30	2	27	1	3	1
	DF	(Italy) ITA	Giuseppe Sabadini	34	0	30	0	4	0
	MF	(Italy) ITA	Antonio Sabato	32	2	28	2	4	0
	DF	(Italy) ITA	Andrea Salvadori	3	0	3	0	0	0
	GK	(Italy) ITA	Alessandro Zaninelli	31	-28	27	-23	4	-5

- Source: https://web.archive.org/web/20160304204507/http://www.webalice.it/stasin/pdf/1980-81.pdf, http://calcio-seriea.net/presenze/1980/845/ and https://www.historical-lineups.com/wp-content/uploads/2016/09/1980-81.pdf
