= 1977–78 US Catanzaro season =

U.S. Catanzaro
1977–78 season
- President: Nicola Ceravolo
- Manager: Giorgio Sereni
- Stadium: Stadio Comunale
- Serie B: 2nd (promoted)
- Coppa Italia: Group Stage
- Top goalscorer: League: Massimo Palanca (18); All: Massimo Palanca (20)

During the 1977–78 season Catanzaro competed in Serie B and Coppa Italia. After a successful campaign finishing second, the club was promoted to Serie A for the following season for the third time in the club's history.

== Squad ==
Note: Flags indicate national team as defined under FIFA eligibility rules; some limited exceptions apply. Players may hold more than one non-FIFA nationality.

Pos.	Nation	Player
GK	ITA	Ruggero Casari
GK	ITA	Sergio Mauro
GK	ITA	Giorgio Pellizzaro
DF	ITA	Massimo Arrighi
DF	ITA	Giuliano Groppi
DF	ITA	Luigi Maldera
DF	ITA	Mauro Pirelli
DF	ITA	Claudio Ranieri
DF	ITA	Manlio Zanini
MF	ITA	Giovanni Improta (captain)

Pos.	Nation	Player
MF	ITA	Enrico Nicolini
MF	ITA	Maurizio Raise
FW	ITA	Alberto Arbitrio
FW	ITA	Adriano Banelli
FW	ITA	Fabio Borzoni
FW	ITA	Santino Mondello
FW	ITA	Pieraldo Nemo
FW	ITA	Massimo Palanca
FW	ITA	Sauro Petrini
FW	ITA	Renzo Rossi

== Competitions ==
=== Overview ===
Competition	First match	Last match	Starting round	Final position	Record							
Competition	First match	Last match	Starting round	Final position	Pld	W	D	L	GF	GA	GD	Win %
Serie B	11 September 1977	11 June 1978		2nd	38	16	12	10	50	41	+9	42.11
Coppa Italia	21 August 1977	4 September 1977	Group	Group	4	1	1	2	4	5	−1	25.00
Total					42	17	13	12	54	46	+8	40.48

Source: Competitions

=== Serie A ===
==== League table ====
Pos	Team	Pld	W	D	L	GF	GA	GD	Pts	Promotion or relegation
1	Ascoli (P, C)	38	26	9	3	73	30	+43	61	Promotion to Serie A
2	Catanzaro (P)	38	16	12	10	50	41	+9	44	Promotion to Serie A
3	Avellino (P)	38	15	14	9	34	29	+5	44	Promotion to Serie A
4	Monza	38	14	14	10	36	29	+7	42	
5	Ternana	38	14	14	10	34	27	+7	42	

Source: Panini
(C) Champions; (P) Promoted

==== Results summary ====
Overall								Home						Away					
Pld	W	D	L	GF	GA	GD	Pts	W	D	L	GF	GA	GD	W	D	L	GF	GA	GD
38	16	12	10	50	41	+9	44	12	4	3	32	17	+15	4	8	7	18	24	−6

Last updated: 21 February 2023.
Source: webalice.it

Note: Wins were only worth 2 points this season

==== Results by round ====
Round	1	2	3	4	5	6	7	8	9	10	11	12	13	14	15	16	17	18	19	20	21	22	23	24	25	26	27	28	29	30	31	32	33	34	35	36	37	38
Ground	A	H	A	H	A	H	A	H	A	H	A	A	H	H	A	H	A	H	A	H	A	H	A	H	A	H	A	H	A	H	H	A	A	H	A	H	A	H
Result	W	W	D	D	L	W	L	W	D	L	L	D	D	W	L	L	D	W	W	D	L	W	D	W	L	W	W	D	W	W	W	D	L	L	D	W	D	W
Position	3	1	4	4	6	3	7	4	4	7	8	10	9	5	8	12	11	10	7	9	10	9	9	4	9	7	5	5	2	2	2	2	2	2	3	2	2	2
Points	2	4	5	6	6	8	8	10	11	11	11	12	13	15	15	15	16	18	20	21	21	23	24	26	26	28	30	31	33	35	37	38	38	38	39	41	42	44

Source: Competitive matches
A = Away; H = Home; W = Win; D = Draw; L = Loss; P = Postponed; = Leader, promotion to Serie A; = Second, promotion to Serie A; = Third, promotion to Serie A; = Relegation to Serie C

=== Coppa Italia ===
==== Group stage ====
Pos	Team	Pld	W	D	L	GF	GA	GD	Pts
1	Napoli(A)	4	4	0	0	11	3	+8	8
2	Palermo(B)	4	2	0	2	5	6	−1	4
3	Vicenza(A)	4	1	1	2	6	7	−1	3
4	Catanzaro(B)	4	1	1	2	4	5	−1	3
5	Avellino(B)	4	1	0	3	3	8	−5	2

== Squad statistics ==
No.	Pos	Nat	Player	Total		Serie B		Coppa Italia	
No.	Pos	Nat	Player	Apps	Goals	Apps	Goals	Apps	Goals
	GK	(Italy) ITA	Ruggero Casari	2	-4	0+1	-2	1	-2
	GK	(Italy) ITA	Sergio Mauro	0	0	0	0	0	0
	GK	(Italy) ITA	Giorgio Pellizzaro	41	-42	38	-39	3	-3
	DF	(Italy) ITA	Massimo Arrighi	26	0	18+4	0	4	0
	DF	(Italy) ITA	Giuliano Groppi	38	3	34	3	4	0
	DF	(Italy) ITA	Luigi Maldera	40	0	36	0	4	0
	DF	(Italy) ITA	Mauro Pirelli	3	0	2+1	0	0	0
	DF	(Italy) ITA	Claudio Ranieri	28	0	28	0	0	0
	DF	(Italy) ITA	Manlio Zanini	35	3	29+2	3	2+2	0
	MF	(Italy) ITA	Giovanni Improta	35	0	31	0	4	0
	MF	(Italy) ITA	Enrico Nicolini	37	2	31+2	2	3+1	0
	MF	(Italy) ITA	Maurizio Raise	3	0	0+3	0	0	0
	FW	(Italy) ITA	Alberto Arbitrio	36	4	32+1	4	3	0
	FW	(Italy) ITA	Adriano Banelli	39	5	35	5	4	0
	FW	(Italy) ITA	Fabio Borzoni	30	2	18+8	2	4	0
	FW	(Italy) ITA	Santino Mondello	13	1	5+6	1	0+2	0
	FW	(Italy) ITA	Pieraldo Nemo	18	1	9+6	1	2+1	0
	FW	(Italy) ITA	Massimo Palanca	35	20	31+1	18	3	2
	FW	(Italy) ITA	Sauro Petrini	9	0	7+2	0	0	0
	FW	(Italy) ITA	Renzo Rossi	37	10	34	10	3	0
	FW	(Italy) ITA	Giorgio Vignando	1	0	0	0	0+1	0

- Source: http://calcio-seriea.net/presenze/1977/2435/ and https://www.historical-lineups.com/wp-content/uploads/2016/09/1977-78.pdf
