= List of US Catanzaro 1929 players =

This is a list of notable footballers who have played for U.S. Catanzaro 1929. This means players that have played 100 or more official matches for the club in Serie A or Serie B.

For a list of all Catanzaro players, major or minor, with a Wikipedia article, see Category:US Catanzaro 1929 players; for records and statistics see List of US Catanzaro 1929 records and statistics; for a selected list of the best players in Catanzaro's history, see U.S. Catanzaro 1929 Hall of Fame.

Players are listed as of 25 February 2023 and according to the date of their first-team debut for the club. Appearances and goals are for first-team competitive matches in Serie A or Serie B only; wartime matches are excluded. Substitute appearances included.

The player with the most league appearances (Serie A or B) is Adriano Banelli with 334. The player with the most league goals (Serie A or B) is Massimo Palanca with 97.

== Key ==
- GK – Goalkeeper
- DF – Defender
- MF – Midfielder
- FW – Forward

== Players ==
Nationality column refers to the country (countries) represented internationally by the player, if any.

Name	Nationality	Position	Catanzaro career	Appearances	Goals
Dino Bigagnoli	Italy	MF	1959–1966	163	1
Flavio Frontali	Italy	MF	1959–1963	102	2
Egidio Ghersetich	Italy	FW	1959–1965	148	33
Stefano Raise	Italy	DF / FW	1959–1966	185	6
Lionello Tulissi	Italy	MF	1959–1963	109	3
Cesare Maccacaro	Italy	MF / FW	1960–1968	221	7
Osvaldo Bagnoli	Italy	FW	1961–1964	101	21
Carlo Vanini	Italy	FW	1962–1968	154	17
Alvaro Gasparini	Italy	MF / FW	1963–1967	137	8
Luigi Tonani	Italy	DF / MF	1963–1969	224	3
Sergio Orlandi	Italy	MF	1964–1968	114	7
Franco Marini	Italy	DF	1965–1971	202	4
Gianfranco Bertoletti	Italy	DF	1966–1971	150	3
Adriano Banelli	Italy	DF / MF	1967–1979	334	24
Paolo Braca	Italy	MF / FW	1967–1977	244	10
Fausto Silipo	Italy	DF	1967–1977	198	2
Pierluigi Busatti	Italy	MF	1968–1972	122	8
Roberto Franzon	Italy	MF	1968–1972	119	1
Maurizio Gori	Italy	FW	1969–1974	126	12
Alberto Spelta	Italy	MF / FW	1971–1976	153	29
Luigi Maldera	Italy	DF	1971–1978	206	5
Giorgio Pellizzaro	Italy	GK	1973–1978	148	0
Pieraldo Nemo	Italy	MF / FW	1974–1979	100	4
Massimo Palanca	Italy	FW	1974–1981; 1987–1990	302	97
Claudio Ranieri	Italy	DF	1974–1982	225	6
Giovanni Improta	Italy	MF	1975–1979	125	11
Enrico Nicolini	Italy	MF	1976–1980; 1987–1989	159	7
Giuseppe Sabadini	Italy	DF	1978–1983	111	1
Piero Braglia	Italy	MF	1978–1984	142	0
Roberto Borrello	Italy	MF / FW	1980–1990	111	5
Armando Cascione	Italy	DF	1981–1989	131	6

Source:calcio-seriea.net

== Captains ==
This is a list of all club captains from 1957. The captains listed are for the league season not individual matches and appearances and goals are for all competitive league games only. No cup or other official tournament matches are included in the statistics.

Name (number of appointments)	Position	Catanzaro Career	Seasons as Captain	Appearances	Goals
(Italy) Vittorio Masci	GK	1946–1947; 1953–1962	5 (1957–1962)	184	-176
(Italy) Stefano Raise	MF	1955–1966	4 (1962–1966)	312	26
(Italy) Luigi Sardei	MF	1963–1968	2 (1966–1968)	93	3
(Italy) Luigi Tonani	DF	1963–1969	1 (1968–1969)	223	3
(Italy) Franco Marini	DF	1965–1971	2 (1969–1971)	202	4
(Italy) Roberto Franzon	MF	1968–1972	1 (1971–1972)	119	1
(Italy) Francesco Rizzo	MF	1972–1974	2 (1972–1974)	63	13
(Italy) Adriano Banelli	MF	1967–1979	5 (1974–1979)	336	24
(Italy) Claudio Ranieri	DF	1974–1982	3 (1979–1982)	225	6
(Italy) Sergio Santarini	DF	1981–1983	1 (1982–1983)	48	1
(Italy) Gregorio Mauro	MF	1976–1977; 1979–1980; 1981, 1984–1985; 1989–1990	1 (1984–1985)	64	8
(Italy) Carmelo Bagnato	MF	1984–1987	2 (1985–1987)	94	6
(Italy) Agostino Iacobelli	MF	1984–1988	1 (1987–1988)	124	2
(Italy) Massimo Palanca	FW	1974–1981; 1986–1990	2 (1988–1990)	331	115
(Italy) Luciano Orati	MF	1983–1985	3 (1990–1993)	74	6
(Italy) Umberto Brutto	DF	1989–1996	3 (1993–1996)	140	3
(Italy) Mauro Picasso	MF	1996–1998	2 (1996–1998)	51	3
(Italy) Antongiulio Bonacci	MF	1998–2001	1 (1998–1999)	66	2
(Italy) Giuseppe Tortora	FW	1999–2000	1 (1999–2000)	32	15
(Italy) Pasquale Logiudice	DF	2000–2001; 2002–2003	1 (2000–2001)	64	2
(Italy) Giovanni Delle Vedove	MF	2000–2002	1 (2001–2002)	52	4
(Italy) Marco Ciardello	MF	1998–1999; 2002–2004	1 (2002–2003)	66	6
(Italy) Fabrizio Ferrigno	MF	2002–2005; 2006, 2007–2008	1 (2003–2004)	87	14
(Italy) Giorgio Corona	FW	2003–2006	2 (2004–2006)	109	46
(Italy) Danilo Coppola	FW	2006–2008	1 (2006–2007)	48	0
(Italy) Fabrizio Ferrigno (2)	MF	2002–2005; 2006, 2007–2008	1 (2007–2008)	87	14
(Italy) Roberto Gimmelli	DF	2006–2010	2 (2008–2010)	123	4
(Italy) Francesco Corapi	MF	2002–2005; 2008–2011; 2020	0.5 (2010–2011)	56	5
(Italy) Giuseppe Benincasa	MF	1998–2002; 2009–2011	0.5 (2011)	123	4
(Italy) Salvatore Accursi	DF	2011–2012	1 (2011–2012)	22	2
(Italy) Salvatore Carboni	FW	2011–2013	1 (2012–2013)	47	15
(Italy) Salvatore Ferraro	DF	2013–2015	1.5 (2013–2015)	48	0
(Italy) Domenico Giampà	MF	1994–1996; 2012, 2015–16	1.5 (2015–2016) (Note: From February 2016, Tommaso Squilace took the captaincy following Giampà's six month football ban for his involvement in the 2015 Italian football match-fixing scandal)	47	15
(Italy) Vito Di Bari	DF	2016	0.5 (2016)	14	2
(Italy) Matthew Patti	DF	2016–2017	0.5 (2016–2017)	34	2
(Italy) Emmanuel Nordi	GK	2017–2018	1 (2017–2018)	32	0
(Italy) Matthais Malta	MF	2011–2012; 2015–2020	1.5 (2018–2020)	48	0
(Italy) Francesco Corapi	MF	2002–2005; 2008–2011; 2020–2021	1.5 (2020–2021)	56	5
(Italy) Luca Martinelli	MF	2019–	2 (2021–)	101	6
