= 1978–79 US Catanzaro season =

US Catanzaro
1978–79 season
- President: Nicola Ceravolo
- Manager: Carlo Mazzone
- Stadium: Stadio Comunale
- Serie A: 9th
- Coppa Italia: Semi-finalist
- Top goalscorer: League: Massimo Palanca (10); All: Massimo Palanca (18)
- Highest home attendance: 25,491 vs Milan (29 April 1979)
- Lowest home attendance: 11,442 vs Bologna (1 April 1979)
- Average home league attendance: 17,177
- Biggest win: 4–0 vs SPAL (3 September 1978, Coppa Italia)
- Biggest defeat: 0–4 vs Milan (7 January 1979, Serie A)

The 1978–79 season was Unione Sportiva Catanzaro's 47th season in existence and the club's first season returning to the Serie A after spending the previous season in Serie B. It was the club's third season overall in the Serie A. In addition to the domestic league, Catanzaro also participated in this season's edition of the Coppa Italia. Catanzaro finished 9th in the domestic league were semi-finalists in the Coppa Italia. Massimo Palanca was the Coppa Italia capocannonieri (top goalscorer) with 8 goals.

== Squad ==
Note: Flags indicate national team as defined under FIFA eligibility rules; some limited exceptions apply. Players may hold more than one non-FIFA nationality.

Pos.	Nation	Player
GK	ITA	Ruggero Casari
GK	ITA	Massimo Mattolini
DF	ITA	Giuliano Groppi
DF	ITA	Leonardo Menichini
DF	ITA	Claudio Ranieri
DF	ITA	Giuseppe Sabadini
DF	ITA	Maurizio Turone
DF	ITA	Manlio Zanini
MF	ITA	Adriano Banelli
MF	ITA	Maurizio Gaiardi

Pos.	Nation	Player
MF	ITA	Giovanni Improta (captain)
MF	ITA	Enrico Nicolini
MF	ITA	Angelo Orazi
MF	ITA	Maurizio Raise
FW	ITA	Piero Braglia
FW	ITA	Pietro Michesi
FW	ITA	Pieraldo Nemo
FW	ITA	Massimo Palanca
FW	ITA	Renzo Rossi

== Competitions ==
=== Overview ===
Competition	First match	Last match	Starting round	Final position	Record							
Competition	First match	Last match	Starting round	Final position	Pld	W	D	L	GF	GA	GD	Win %
Serie A	1 October 1978	13 May 1979		9th	30	6	16	8	23	30	−7	20.00
Coppa Italia	27 August 1978	31 May 1979	Group	Semifinalist	8	4	3	1	12	11	+1	50.00
Total					38	10	19	9	35	41	−6	26.32

Source: Competitions

=== Serie A ===
==== League table ====
Pos	Team	Pld	W	D	L	GF	GA	GD	Pts
7	Fiorentina	30	10	12	8	26	26	0	32
8	Lazio	30	9	11	10	35	40	−5	29
9	Catanzaro	30	6	16	8	23	30	−7	28
10	Ascoli	30	7	12	11	26	31	−5	26
11	Avellino	30	6	14	10	19	26	−7	26

Source: Panini

==== Results summary ====
Overall								Home						Away					
Pld	W	D	L	GF	GA	GD	Pts	W	D	L	GF	GA	GD	W	D	L	GF	GA	GD
30	6	16	8	23	30	−7	28	4	10	1	13	9	+4	2	6	7	10	21	−11

Last updated: 21 February 2023.
Source: webalice.it

Note: Wins were only worth 2 points this season

==== Results by round ====
Round	1	2	3	4	5	6	7	8	9	10	11	12	13	14	15	16	17	18	19	20	21	22	23	24	25	26	27	28	29	30
Ground	H	A	H	A	H	A	H	A	A	H	H	A	A	H	A	A	H	A	H	A	H	A	H	H	A	A	H	H	A	H
Result	D	L	D	D	W	D	D	D	D	W	D	L	L	D	L	W	W	L	D	W	D	D	D	D	L	D	D	L	L	W
Position	12	13	12	12	10	10	10	9	9	8	8	9	9	10	11	9	8	9	9	7	8	7	8	9	9	9	9	9	9	9

Source: Competitive matches
A = Away; H = Home; W = Win; D = Draw; L = Loss; P = Postponed; = Leader, 1979–80 European Cup; = 1979–80 UEFA Cup; = 1979-80 Serie B; R = 1979-80 UEFA Cup Winners' Cup

==== Matches ====
1 October 1978 1	Catanzaro	0–0	Atalanta	Catanzaro
15:00 CET				Stadium: Stadio Comunale; Referee: Giancarlo Lapi

8 October 1978 2	L.R. Vicenza	2–0	Catanzaro	Vicenza
15:00 CET	Prestanti 53'; Guidetti 56' (pen.)			Stadium: Stadio Romeo Menti; Referee: Ferdinando Reggiani

15 October 1978 3	Catanzaro	0–0	Juventus	Catanzaro
15:00 CET				Stadium: Stadio Comunale; Referee: Gianfranco Menegali

22 October 1978 4	Inter Milan	0–0	Catanzaro	Milan
14:30 CET				Stadium: San Siro; Referee: Roberto Terpin

29 October 1978 5	Catanzaro	1–0	Roma	Catanzaro
14:30 CET	Rocca 46' (o.g.)			Stadium: Stadio Comunale; Referee: Rosario Lo Bello

5 November 1978 6	Avellino	0–0	Catanzaro	Avellino
14:30 CET				Stadium: Stadio Partenio; Referee: Enzo Barbaresco

12 November 1978 7	Catanzaro	0–0	Fiorentina	Catanzaro
14:30 CET				Stadium: Stadio Comunale; Referee: Claudio Pieri

19 November 1978 8	Ascoli	1–1	Catanzaro	Ascoli Piceno
14:30 CET	Moro 85'		30' Orazi	Stadium: Stadio Cino e Lillo Del Duca; Referee: Paolo Bergamo

26 November 1978 9	Bologna	1–1	Catanzaro	Bologna
14:30 CET	Paris 23' (pen.)		61' Zanini	Stadium: Stadio Renato Dall'Ara; Referee: Maurizio Mattei

3 December 1978 10	Catanzaro	3–1	Lazio	Catanzaro
14:30 CET	Palanca 16', 87'; Rossi 79'		83' Wilson	Stadium: Stadio Comunale; Referee: Gino Menicucci

10 December 1978 11	Catanzaro	1–1	Hellas Verona	Catanzaro
14:30 CET	Palanca 9'		5' Musiello	Stadium: Stadio Comunale; Referee: Franco Tonolini

17 December 1978 12	Perugia	1–0	Catanzaro	Perugia
14:30 CET	Speggiorin 61'			Stadium: Stadio Renato Curi; Referee: Domenico Lops

7 January 1979 13	Milan	4–0	Catanzaro	Milan
14:30 CET	Chiodi 16'; Bigon 21'; Novellino 76'; Antonelli 81'			Stadium: San Siro; Referee: Rosario Lo Bello

14 January 1979 14	Catanzaro	0–0	Napoli	Catanzaro
14:30 CET				Stadium: Stadio Comunale; Referee: Carlo Longhi

21 January 1979 15	Torino	3–0	Catanzaro	Turin
14:30 CET	Pulici 31', 57', 81' (pen.)			Stadium: Stadio Comunale; Referee: Enzo Barbaresco

28 January 1979 16	Atalanta	0–2	Catanzaro	Bergamo
14:30 CET			79' Improta; 90' Rossi	Stadium: Stadio Comunale; Referee: Egidio Ballerini

4 February 1979 17	Catanzaro	2–0	L.R. Vicenza	Catanzaro
15:00 CET	Palanca 30', 89'			Stadium: Stadio Comunale; Referee: Giancarlo Menegali

11 February 1979 18	Juventus	3–1	Catanzaro	Turin
15:00 CET	Bettega 8'; Tardelli 52'; Cabrini 61'		79' Zanini	Stadium: Stadio Comunale; Referee: Luigi Agnolin

18 February 1979 19	Catanzaro	1–1	Inter Milan	Catanzaro
15:00 CET	Groppi 71'		56' Muraro	Stadium: Stadio Comunale; Referee: Gino Menicucci

4 March 1979 20	Roma	1–3	Catanzaro	Rome
15:00 CET	Di Bartolomei 24' (pen.)		5', 43', 68' Palanca	Stadium: Stadio Olimpico; Referee: Ferdinando Reggiani

11 March 1979 21	Catanzaro	0–0	Avellino	Catanzaro
15:00 CET				Stadium: Stadio Comunale; Referee: Paolo Casarin

18 March 1979 22	Fiorentina	1–1	Catanzaro	Firenze
15:00 CET	Pagliari 55'		32' Palanca	Stadium: Stadio Comunale; Referee: Pietro D'Elia

25 March 1979 23	Catanzaro	1–1	Ascoli	Catanzaro
15:00 CET	Ranieri 46'		43' Trevisanello	Stadium: Stadio Comunale; Referee: Giancarlo Lapi

1 April 1979 24	Catanzaro	0–0	Bologna	Catanzaro
15:30 CET				Stadium: Stadio Comunale; Referee: Luigi Agnolin

8 April 1979 25	Lazio	3–1	Catanzaro	Rome
15:30 CET	D'Amico 40'; Giordano 49'; Garlaschelli 85'		47' Palanca	Stadium: Stadio Olimpico; Referee: Ruggero Mascia

14 April 1979 26	Hellas Verona	0–0	Catanzaro	Verona
15:30 CET				Stadium: Stadio Marcantonio Bentegodi; Referee: Tullio Lanese

22 April 1979 27	Catanzaro	1–1	Perugia	Catanzaro
15:30 CET	Rossi 60'		2' Butti	Stadium: Stadio Comunale; Referee: Gianfranco Menegali

29 April 1979 28	Catanzaro	1–3	Milan	Catanzaro
15:30 CET	Ranieri 52'		48' Maldera; 58' Novellino; 89' Antonelli	Stadium: Stadio Comunale; Referee: Carlo Longhi

6 May 1979 29	Napoli	1–0	Catanzaro	Naples
16:00 CET	Nicolini 65' (o.g.)			Stadium: Stadio San Paolo; Referee: Ferdinando Reggiani

13 May 1979 30	Catanzaro	2–1	Torino	Catanzaro
16:00 CET	Mozzini 62' (o.g.); Orazi 73'		25' (o.g.) Menichini	Stadium: Stadio Comunale; Referee: Piero Patrussi

=== Coppa Italia ===
==== Group stage ====
Pos	Team	Pld	W	D	L	GF	GA	GD	Pts
1	Catanzaro	4	3	1	0	11	4	+7	7
2	Milan	4	2	1	1	9	7	+2	5
3	SPAL	4	2	0	2	6	6	0	4
4	Lecce	4	1	0	3	4	7	−3	2
5	Foggia	4	1	0	3	2	8	−6	2

===== Group matches =====
27 August 1978 1	Catanzaro	3–1	Lecce	Catanzaro
	Ranieri 16'; Palanca 57', 73'		Cannito 45'	Stadium: Stadio Comunale; Referee: Tullio Lanese

30 August 1978 2	Foggia	1–2	Catanzaro	Foggia
	Pirazzini 38'		Palanca 43', 47'	Referee: Carlo Longhi

3 September 1978 3	Catanzaro	4–0	S.P.A.L.	Catanzaro
	Palanca 10'; Improta 11'; Orazi 16'; Rossi 68'			Stadium: Stadio Comunale; Referee: Fernando Tani

17 September 1978 5	Milan	2–2	Catanzaro	Milan
	Chiodi 19' (pen.); Bet 65'		Ranieri 59'; Palanca 89' (pen.)	Stadium: San Siro; Referee: Luigi Angolin

==== Quarterfinals ====
25 April 1979 1	Cagliari	2–2	Catanzaro	Cagliari
	L. Piras 21'; Bellini 51'		Palanca 24'; Improta 52'	Referee: Paolo Milan

16 May 1979 2	Catanzaro	1–0 (3–2 agg.)	Cagliari	Catanzaro
	Palanca 49'			Stadium: Stadio Comunale; Referee: Giancarlo Redini

==== Semifinals ====
20 May 1979 1	Catanzaro	1–1	Juventus	Catanzaro
16:30 CET	Gentile 62' (o.g.)	Report	Bettega 16'	Stadium: Stadio Comunale; Attendance: 15,088; Referee: Luigi Agnolin

31 May 1979 2	Juventus	4–2 (5–3 agg.)	Catanzaro	Turin
20:30 CEST	Cabrini 55' (pen.); Tardelli 69'; Causio 80'; Virdis 87'	Report	Sabadini 71'; Groppi 84'	Stadium: Stadio Comunale; Attendance: 28,057; Referee: Gino Menicucci

== Squad statistics ==
No.	Pos	Nat	Player	Total		Serie A		Coppa Italia	
No.	Pos	Nat	Player	Apps	Goals	Apps	Goals	Apps	Goals
	GK	(Italy) ITA	Ruggero Casari	0	0	0	0	0	0
	GK	(Italy) ITA	Massimo Mattolini	38	-41	30	-30	8	-11
	DF	(Italy) ITA	Giuliano Groppi	32	2	24	1	8	1
	DF	(Italy) ITA	Leonardo Menichini	29	0	25	0	4	0
	DF	(Italy) ITA	Claudio Ranieri	35	4	27	2	8	2
	DF	(Italy) ITA	Giuseppe Sabadini	33	1	27	0	6	1
	DF	(Italy) ITA	Maurizio Turone	24	0	17	0	7	0
	DF	(Italy) ITA	Manlio Zanini	31	2	26	2	5	0
	MF	(Italy) ITA	Adriano Banelli	19	0	13	0	6	0
	MF	(Italy) ITA	Maurizio Gaiardi	6	0	3	0	3	0
	MF	(Italy) ITA	Giovanni Improta	34	3	27	1	7	2
	MF	(Italy) ITA	Enrico Nicolini	34	0	26	0	8	0
	MF	(Italy) ITA	Angelo Orazi	36	3	28	2	8	1
	MF	(Italy) ITA	Maurizio Raise	4	0	2	0	2	0
	FW	(Italy) ITA	Piero Braglia	22	0	21	0	1	0
	FW	(Italy) ITA	Pietro Michesi	27	0	25	0	2	0
	FW	(Italy) ITA	Pieraldo Nemo	3	0	1	0	2	0
	FW	(Italy) ITA	Massimo Palanca	37	18	30	10	7	8
	FW	(Italy) ITA	Renzo Rossi	30	4	23	3	7	1

- Source: http://calcio-seriea.net/presenze/1978/804/ and https://www.historical-lineups.com/wp-content/uploads/2016/09/1978-79.pdf
