= Antonio Sabato =

Antonio Sabato may refer to:

- Antonio Sabàto Sr. (1943–2021), Italian actor
- Antonio Sabàto Jr. (born 1972), model and actor
- Antonio Sabato (footballer) (born 1958), retired Italian professional football player
