= Pellizzaro =

Pellizzaro is an Italian surname. Notable people with the surname include:

- Giorgio Pellizzaro (1947–2025), Italian football goalkeeper and goalkeeper coach
- Sergio Pellizzaro (born 1945), Italian footballer
