= Bruno Bolchi =

Italian football player and manager (1940–2022)

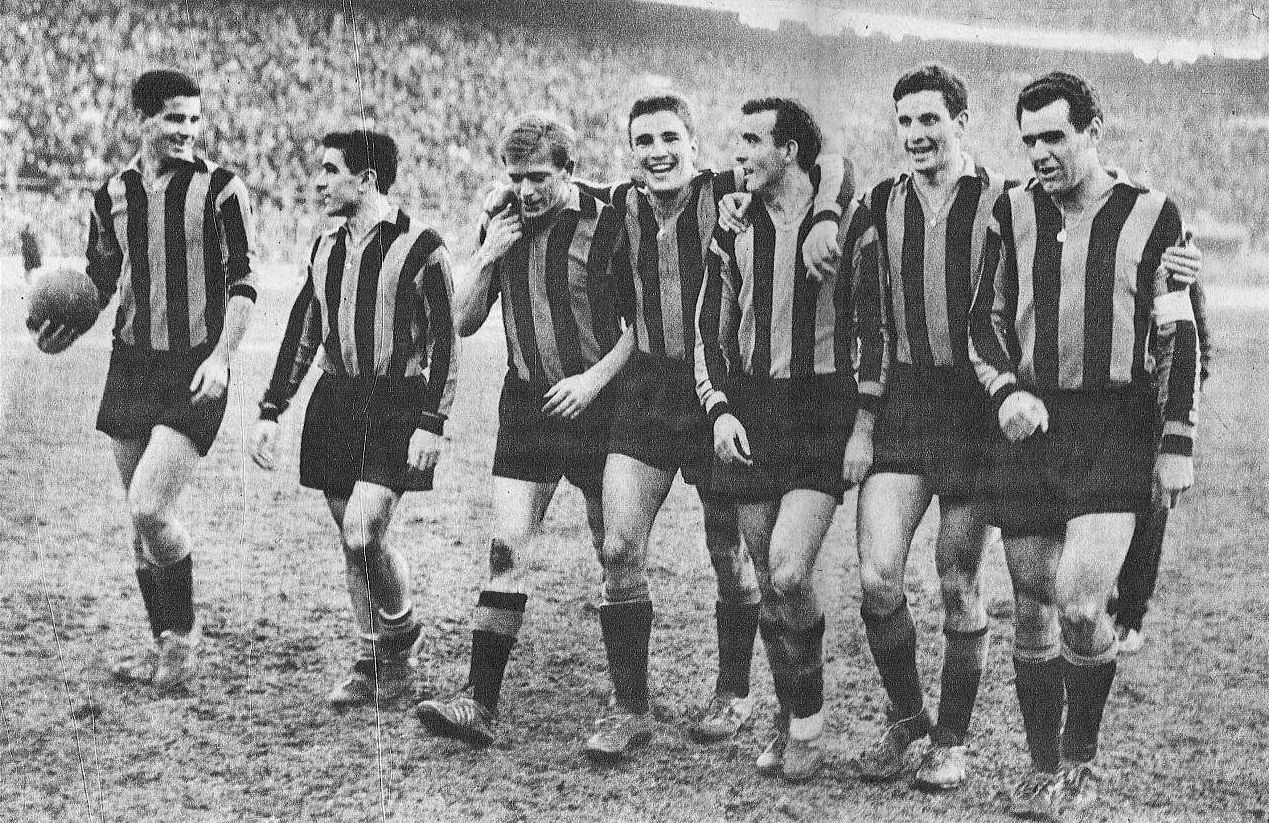
- Bolchi (right) in 1962

Personal information
- Date of birth: 21 February 1940
- Place of birth: Milan, Italy
- Date of death: 27 September 2022 (aged 82)
- Place of death: Florence, Italy
- Height: 1.87 m (6 ft 2 in)
- Position: Midfielder

Senior career*
Years	Team	Apps	(Gls)
1958–1963	Internazionale	109	(10)
1963–1964	Verona	19	(0)
1964–1965	Atalanta	25	(2)
1965–1970	Torino	89	(0)
1970-1972	Pro Patria	25	(0)

International career
1961	Italy	4	(0)

Managerial career
- 1971–1972: Pro Patria
- 1972–1973: Pistoiese
- 1973–1974: Unione Valdinievole
- 1974–1975: Sorrento
- 1975–1976: Messina
- 1976–1978: Pistoiese
- 1978–1979: Novara
- 1980–1981: Atalanta
- 1982–1983: Cesena
- 1983–1986: Bari
- 1986–1987: Cesena
- 1987–1988: Arezzo
- 1988–1989: Pisa
- 1989–1990: Reggina
- 1990–1991: Brescia
- 1991–1992: Avellino
- 1992–1993: Lecce
- 1993–1995: Cesena
- 1995–1997: Lucchese
- 1997–1998: Monza
- 1999: Reggina
- 2000–2001: Genoa
- 2001–2002: Ternana
- 2003: Messina
- 2004: Ternana
- 2005: Catanzaro
- 2007: Messina
- * Club domestic league appearances and goals

Bruno Bolchi (Italian pronunciation: [ˈbruːno ˈbolki]; 21 February 1940 – 27 September 2022) was an Italian football manager and player, who played as a midfielder. Throughout his playing career, he played for Internazionale, Verona, Atalanta and Torino, as well as the Italy national team. Bolchi was depicted in the first-ever Panini sticker to be printed in 1961.

== Club career ==
Born in Milan, Bolchi made his debut at the age of 18 with Internazionale in a Serie A away match lost 1–0 to Napoli on 18 May 1958. He played six seasons with the nerazzurri, with 109 caps and ten goals, gaining the nickname Maciste, due to his imposing physique, strength, and hard-tackling style of play. He captained the side between 1961 and 1962 and obtained notable success during his spell with the club, winning the Serie A title in 1963, and the European Cup in 1964. He then played for Serie B side Verona, and returned to play in the top division for Atalanta and Torino, where he ended his playing career in 1970, also winning the Coppa Italia with the latter club in 1968.

== International career ==
Bolchi appeared for the Italy national team on four occasions, all in 1961.

== Managerial career ==
Bolchi started his coaching career in 1971 with Pro Patria, then a Seconda Categoria club (at the time, Seconda Categoria was the sixth level of Italian football). In 1974, he had his first professional coaching job at Sorrento. He also coached Pistoiese, winning the 1976–77 Serie C title, earning promotion into Serie B. He first coached a Serie A team, Cesena, in 1982, but did not manage to save it from relegation. Since then, Bolchi made just two appearances as Serie A coach, despite his long career all over the country: in 1985–86, his third season as Bari's boss which followed two consecutive promotions from Serie C1 (winning the 1983–84 Serie C1 title) to the top tier of Italian football; however, Bolchi was not able to save the biancorossi. In 1988–89, he had his last Serie A job before 2007, as Pisa head coach, but he was sacked after the 22nd matchday.

On 23 April 2007, with just five matches remaining before the end of the league, Bolchi was appointed head coach of Messina, a team he already coached in their 1975–76 Serie C campaign and, for six matches, at the end of the 2002–03 season, in Serie B. He did not manage to avoid relegation, also due to Messina's poor league table well before his appointment, and finally retired from football after the end of the season.

== Death ==
Bolchi died in Florence on 27 September 2022, at the age of 82.

== Honours ==
=== Player ===
Inter

- Serie A: 1962–63
- European Cup: 1963–64

Torino

- Coppa Italia: 1967–68

=== Manager ===
Pistoiese

- Serie C2, Girone B: 1976–77

Bari

- Serie C1: 1983–84
