= Vito Chimenti =

Italian footballer (1953–2023)

- Chimenti during 1981–1982 season with Avellino

Personal information
- Date of birth: 9 December 1953
- Place of birth: Bari, Italy
- Date of death: 29 January 2023 (aged 69)
- Place of death: Pomarico, Italy
- Height: 1.70 m (5 ft 7 in)
- Position: Forward

Senior career*
Years	Team	Apps	(Gls)
1972–1973	Matera	36	(16)
1973	Lazio	0	(0)
1973–1974	Lecco	25	(5)
1974–1975	Salernitana	29	(3)
1975–1977	Matera	63	(27)
1977–1979	Palermo	74	(29)
1979–1980	Catanzaro	26	(1)
1980–1981	Pistoiese	25	(9)
1981–1982	Avellino	26	(3)
1982–1985	Taranto	83	(22)
Total		387	(115)

Managerial career
- 1995: Matera
- 1995–1996: Matera (assistant)
- 1996–1997: Rimini (assistant)
- 1998–1999: Casarano (assistant)
- 1999–2000: Lanciano (assistant)
- 2000–2001: A.C.R. Messina (assistant)
- 2004–2005: Matera
- 2006: Leonessa Altamura
- 2007: Foggia (assistant)
- 2009: Salernitana (assistant)
- 2021–2023: Pomarico (Under-19)
- * Club domestic league appearances and goals

Vito Chimenti (9 December 1953 – 29 January 2023) was an Italian football player and manager, who played as a forward.

== Club career ==
During his club career, Chimenti played as a striker for several Italian teams in Serie A, Serie B and Serie C.

He first played for Avis Edilsport Altamura before joining Matera, where he played his first Serie C championship in the 1972–73 season. After a brief season with Lazio, he returned to Serie C, first with Lecco, then with Salernitana and Matera.

In the 1977–78 season, he moved to Palermo in Serie B, where he played two seasons and scored 29 goals overall. During the second campaign, he scored the opening goal for Palermo in the first minute of the 1978–79 Coppa Italia final, which eventually ended in a 2–1 loss against Juventus. In the same occasion, Chimenti had to be substituted out of the pitch at half time, following a knee injury caused by a foul from Antonio Cabrini.

In the summer of 1979, he joined Serie A side Catanzaro, where he subsequently made his top-tier debut on 16 September 1979; however, he would only score once in the league. He made a transfer to fellow top-flight club Pistoiese, where he would score nine goals throughout the 1980–81 season: although the team finished at the bottom of the league table and got relegated, Chimenti became Pistoiese's top scorer in Serie A, a record that he still holds.

In the summer of 1981, he moved to Avellino, where he scored three goals. Then, the following year, he joined Serie C1 side Taranto, where he became the tournament's top scorer in the 1982–83 season with 13 goals, subsequently helping his team gain promotion to Serie B. Chimenti stayed at the club until 1985, when he was sentenced to serve a five-year ban from activity, due to his involvement in the Padova match-fixing scandal. Following his disqualification, the striker put his playing career to an end.

== Managerial career ==
After he retired from playing football, Chimenti pursued a managerial career, serving as a head coach or an assistant coach for several Italian teams.

== Style of play ==
Chimenti was a forward known for his goal-scoring prowess, who also became famous for his trademark dribbling technique, called bicicletta ("bicycle"), which should not be confused with the bicycle kick.

== Personal life and death ==
Vito was the brother of former forward Francesco Chimenti, as well as the uncle of former goalkeeper Antonio Chimenti.

Chimenti died from a heart attack in Pomarico on 29 January 2023, at the age of 69.
