= 1976–77 Serie C =

The 1976–77 Serie C was the thirty-ninth edition of Serie C, the third highest league in the Italian football league system.

== Group A (North) ==
Serie C Gir. A 1976-77 team distribution
Serie C Gir. B 1976-77 team distribution
Serie C Gir. B 1976-77 team distribution in Tuscany
Serie C Gir. C 1976-77 team distribution
Serie C Gir. C 1976-77 team distribution in Campania

Pos	Team	Pld	W	D	L	GF	GA	GD	Pts	Promotion or relegation
1	Cremonese (P)	38	21	13	4	42	18	+24	55	Promoted to Serie B
2	Udinese	38	19	13	6	51	28	+23	51	
3	Treviso	38	17	14	7	39	20	+19	48	
4	Lecco	38	17	10	11	43	29	+14	44	
5	Juniorcasale	38	15	13	10	41	31	+10	43	
6	Alessandria	38	14	13	11	37	33	+4	41	
7	Bolzano	38	14	13	11	38	34	+4	41	
8	Triestina	38	11	17	10	43	33	+10	39	
9	Pro Vercelli	38	12	14	12	35	36	−1	38	
10	Sant'Angelo	38	12	13	13	31	37	−6	37	
11	Mantova	38	9	18	11	31	33	−2	36	
12	Piacenza	38	10	16	12	36	39	−3	36	
13	Padova	38	10	16	12	32	37	−5	36	
14	Pro Patria	38	12	12	14	34	41	−7	36	
15	Pergocrema	38	11	13	14	29	35	−6	35	
16	Seregno	38	10	15	13	31	37	−6	35	
17	Biellese	38	10	14	14	31	34	−3	34	
18	Albese (R)	38	10	13	15	20	33	−13	33	Relegated to Serie D
19	Clodiasottomarina (R)	38	8	8	22	25	48	−23	24	Relegated to Serie D
20	Venezia (R)	38	6	6	26	25	58	−33	18	Relegated to Serie D

Source: Panini
(P) Promoted; (R) Relegated

== Girone B ==
Pos	Team	Pld	W	D	L	GF	GA	GD	Pts	Promotion or relegation
1	Pistoiese	38	21	12	5	45	16	+29	54	Promoted to Serie B
2	Parma	38	16	14	8	46	33	+13	46	
3	Spezia	38	11	20	7	34	23	+11	42	
4	Lucchese	38	14	12	12	31	28	+3	40	
5	Pisa	38	15	10	13	38	36	+2	40	
6	Reggiana	38	13	13	12	35	32	+3	39	
7	Giulianova	38	14	11	13	39	40	−1	39	
8	Siena	38	10	18	10	28	28	0	38	
9	Arezzo	38	7	24	7	26	28	−2	38	
10	Olbia	38	10	17	11	32	36	−4	37	
11	Fano	38	11	14	13	33	35	−2	36	
12	Teramo	38	11	14	13	33	37	−4	36	
13	Riccione	38	10	16	12	32	38	−6	36	
14	Grosseto	38	9	18	11	27	40	−13	36	
15	Livorno	38	9	17	12	32	37	−5	35	
16	Massese	38	9	17	12	34	45	−11	35	
17	Empoli	38	12	10	16	39	38	+1	34	
18	Viterbese	38	7	20	11	34	37	−3	34 (Note: Relegated for goal difference.)	Relegated to Serie D
19	Anconitana	38	10	14	14	34	39	−5	34	Relegated to Serie D
20	Sangiovannese	38	7	17	14	25	31	−6	31	Relegated to Serie D

== Girone C ==
Pos	Team	Pld	W	D	L	GF	GA	GD	Pts	Promotion or relegation
1	Bari	38	21	12	5	51	28	+23	54	Promoted to Serie B
2	Paganese	38	14	20	4	30	18	+12	48	
3	Reggina	38	15	12	11	39	27	+12	42	
4	Crotone	38	16	10	12	37	35	+2	42	
5	Trapani	38	14	11	13	36	30	+6	39	
6	Salernitana	38	12	14	12	31	26	+5	38	
7	Turris	38	13	12	13	36	34	+2	38	
8	Benevento	38	15	8	15	30	28	+2	38	
9	Siracusa	38	12	14	12	30	30	0	38	
10	Brindisi	38	10	17	11	29	28	+1	37	
11	Nocerina	38	11	15	12	27	26	+1	37	
12	Barletta	38	11	15	12	35	39	−4	37	
13	Matera	38	14	8	16	34	32	+2	36	
14	Marsala	38	9	18	11	33	36	−3	36	
15	Sorrento	38	10	16	12	23	26	−3	36	
16	Campobasso	38	11	14	13	26	30	−4	36	
17	Pro Vasto	38	10	16	12	27	32	−5	36	
18	Alcamo	38	12	12	14	29	40	−11	36 (Note: Relegated for goal difference.)	Relegated to Serie D
19	Messina	38	8	12	18	22	38	−16	28	Relegated to Serie D
20	Cosenza	38	7	14	17	26	48	−22	28	Relegated to Serie D

== References and sources ==
- Almanacco Illustrato del Calcio – La Storia 1898–2004, Panini Edizioni, Modena, September 2005
