= Giorgio Sereni =

Italian footballer and manager (1935–2010)

Personal information
- Date of birth: 3 September 1935
- Place of birth: Brescia, Italy
- Date of death: 6 October 2010 (aged 75)
- Height: 1.79 m (5 ft 10 in)
- Position: Defender

Senior career*
Years	Team	Apps	(Gls)
1955–1957	Reggiana		
1957–1963	Palermo		
1963–1969	Padova		

Managerial career
- 1969–1970: Venezia
- 1970–1971: Reggiana (assistant)
- 1972–1973: Parma
- 1977–1978: Catanzaro
- 1978–1979: Rimini
- 1979–1980: Foggia
- 1980–1981: Parma
- 1981–1982: Rende
- 1982–1983: SSC Campania
- 1983–1984: Padova
- 1984–1985: SSC Campania
- 1985–1986: Salernitana
- 1986–1987: Siena
- 1988–1989: Monopoli
- 1991–1992: Giulianova
- * Club domestic league appearances and goals

Giorgio Sereni (3 September 1935 — 6 October 2010) was an Italian football defender and later manager.
