= Gabriele Morganti =

Italian football player and manager

Personal information
- Date of birth: 23 November 1958 (age 67)
- Place of birth: Senigallia, Italy
- Height: 1.81 m (5 ft 11 1/2 in)
- Position: Defender

Youth career
- 197?–1975: Vigor Senigallia

Senior career*
Years	Team	Apps	(Gls)
1975–1976	Vigor Senigallia	9	(0)
1976–1980	Cesena	52	(0)
1980–1981	Catanzaro	24	(0)
1981–1982	SPAL	7	(0)
1982	Como	13	(0)
1982–1983	Cesena	7	(0)
1983–1984	L.R. Vicenza	25	(0)
1987-1988	Salernitana	33	(0)

Managerial career
- 1997–2000: Vigor Senigallia
- 2000–2001: Chieti
- 2001–2002: L'Aquila
- 2002–2003: San Marino Calcio
- 2003–2005: Fano
- 2005–2006: Chieti
- 2006–2008: Fossombrone
- 2010–2011: Civitanovese
- 2011–2013: Marotta
- * Club domestic league appearances and goals

Gabriele Morganti (born 23 November 1958, in Senigallia) is an Italian professional football player and manager.

== Career ==
In 1975, he began his professional career for the Vigor Senigallia. Also he played for the Cesena, Catanzaro, SPAL, Como and L.R. Vicenza.

In 1997, he started his coaching career in Vigor Senigallia. Since 2000, he coached the Chieti. Later on worked with the L'Aquila. In 2002–2003 season he led the San Marino Calcio. In 2003, became the new coach of Fano. In 2005–2006 season he again coached the Chieti. Later he Fossombrone, Civitanovese and Marotta.
