= Franco Peccenini =

Italian footballer

Personal information
- Date of birth: 16 August 1953 (age 73)
- Place of birth: Palestrina, Italy
- Height: 1.78 m (5 ft 10 in)
- Position: Defender

Senior career*
Years	Team	Apps	(Gls)
1971–1980	Roma	153	(0)
1980–1984	Catanzaro	49	(0)
1984–1985	Ternana	23	(0)

International career
1973	Italy U-21	1	(0)
- * Club domestic league appearances and goals

Franco Peccenini (born 16 August 1953 in Palestrina) is an Italian former professional football player.

Born in Palestrina, Peccenini began playing football with Roma. He made his Serie A debut against Varese on 12 March 1972. He played 12 seasons (192 games) in the Serie A for A.S. Roma and F.C. Catanzaro. He was the pillar of Roma's defence, together with Francesco Rocca for 8 seasons in the 1970s.

== Honours ==
- Coppa Italia winner: 1979/80.
