= 1980–81 Serie A =

79th season of top-tier Italian football

Serie A
- Season: 1980–81
- Dates: 14 September 1980 – 24 May 1981
- Champions: Juventus; 19th title
- Relegated: Perugia; Brescia; Pistoiese
- European Cup: Juventus
- Cup Winners' Cup: Roma
- UEFA Cup: Napoli; Internazionale
- Matches: 240
- Goals: 460 (1.92 per match)
- Top goalscorer: Roberto Pruzzo (18 goals)

Serie A 1980-81 team distribution

The 1980–81 Serie A season was won by Juventus.

== Teams ==
Como, Pistoiese and Brescia had been promoted from Serie B.

== Final classification ==
Pos	Team	Pld	W	D	L	GF	GA	GD	Pts	Qualification or relegation
1	Juventus (C)	30	17	10	3	46	15	+31	44	Qualification to European Cup
2	Roma	30	14	14	2	43	20	+23	42	Qualification to Cup Winners' Cup
3	Napoli	30	14	10	6	31	21	+10	38	Qualification to UEFA Cup
4	Internazionale	30	14	8	8	41	24	+17	36	Qualification to UEFA Cup
5	Fiorentina	30	9	14	7	28	25	+3	32	
6	Cagliari	30	8	14	8	29	30	−1	30	
7	Bologna (Note: Bologna, Avellino and Perugia started the season with a 5-point penalisation because of the Totonero 1980 scandal.)	30	11	12	7	32	27	+5	29	
8	Catanzaro	30	6	17	7	24	27	−3	29	
9	Torino	30	8	10	12	26	29	−3	26	
10	Avellino	30	10	10	10	36	33	+3	25 (Note: Positions decided by head-to-head points. Avellino 10 pts; Ascoli 10 pts; Udinese 8 pts; Como 6 pts; Brescia 6 pts.)	
11	Ascoli	30	7	11	12	18	34	−16	25	
12	Udinese	30	6	13	11	24	39	−15	25	
13	Como	30	8	9	13	25	33	−8	25	
14	Brescia (R)	30	4	17	9	19	25	−6	25	Relegation to Serie B
15	Perugia (R)	30	5	13	12	18	31	−13	18	Relegation to Serie B
16	Pistoiese (R)	30	6	4	20	19	46	−27	16	Relegation to Serie B

Source: Panini
(C) Champions; (R) Relegated

== Results ==
Home \ Away	ASC	AVE	BOL	BRE	CAG	CAT	COM	FIO	INT	JUV	NAP	PER	PIS	ROM	TOR	UDI
Ascoli	—	1–1	1–1	0–0	0–0	1–2	2–1	1–0	0–1	0–0	3–2	0–3	0–0	0–0	0–0	1–0
Avellino	4–2	—	2–0	1–0	2–1	1–0	2–1	2–3	1–3	1–1	0–0	2–1	3–0	1–1	3–0	0–0
Bologna	1–0	0–0	—	0–1	2–1	0–0	1–1	2–1	2–1	1–5	1–1	4–0	2–0	1–1	1–0	1–0
Brescia	0–1	1–2	0–0	—	1–0	1–1	1–0	0–0	0–0	1–1	1–2	1–1	2–2	1–2	1–1	1–1
Cagliari	2–0	1–0	0–0	1–2	—	2–1	1–1	0–0	1–1	1–1	0–0	2–1	2–0	1–0	1–1	1–1
Catanzaro	2–0	1–1	2–2	0–0	0–0	—	2–0	2–2	0–0	0–0	0–0	0–1	1–3	1–1	1–0	2–1
Como	0–0	2–0	2–1	2–2	3–1	0–0	—	2–1	1–0	1–2	0–1	1–0	1–0	0–1	0–2	2–0
Fiorentina	2–1	2–1	2–1	1–0	0–0	1–1	1–1	—	0–0	0–1	0–1	1–0	1–2	1–1	2–0	1–1
Internazionale	1–2	0–0	1–0	0–0	4–1	2–2	2–1	1–2	—	1–0	3–0	3–1	2–0	2–4	1–1	2–0
Juventus	3–0	1–0	0–1	2–0	1–1	3–0	2–0	1–0	2–1	—	1–1	2–1	4–1	0–0	1–2	4–0
Napoli	1–0	1–0	2–1	1–1	2–0	1–1	2–0	1–1	1–0	0–1	—	0–1	1–0	4–0	1–3	1–0
Perugia	0–0	0–0	0–0	0–0	1–1	0–0	0–0	0–0	0–2	0–0	0–0	—	3–0	1–1	1–0	1–2
Pistoiese	0–1	2–1	0–2	1–0	1–3	0–1	2–0	0–1	1–2	1–3	0–1	1–0	—	0–4	1–1	1–1
Roma	4–1	1–1	1–1	1–0	1–0	0–0	1–1	1–1	1–0	0–0	1–1	5–0	1–0	—	2–0	3–1
Torino	3–0	2–0	1–2	1–1	1–2	2–0	1–1	1–1	0–1	0–2	0–1	2–0	1–0	0–2	—	0–0
Udinese	0–0	5–4	1–1	0–0	2–2	2–1	2–0	0–0	0–4	0–2	2–1	1–1	1–0	0–2	0–0	—

Legend: Blue = home team win; Yellow = draw; Red = away team win.

== Top goalscorers ==
Rank	Player	Club	Goals
1	(Italy) Roberto Pruzzo	Roma	18
2	(Italy) Massimo Palanca	Catanzaro	13
3	(Italy) Alessandro Altobelli	Internazionale	12
4	(Italy) Claudio Pellegrini	Napoli	11
4	(Italy) Francesco Graziani	Torino	11
6	(Italy) Giancarlo Antognoni	Fiorentina	9
6	(Italy) Vito Chimenti	Pistoiese	9
6	(Italy) Paolo Pulici	Torino	9
9	(Republic of Ireland) Liam Brady	Juventus	8
9	(Italy) Franco Selvaggi	Cagliari	8
9	(Italy) Nicola Zanone	Udinese	8
12	(Italy) Antonio Cabrini	Juventus	7
12	(Italy) Marco Tardelli	Juventus	7
12	(Italy) Evaristo Beccalossi	Internazionale	7
12	(Italy) Giuliano Fiorini	Bologna	7

== Attendances ==
#	Club	Average
1	Napoli	56,807
2	Roma	51,103
3	Internazionale	42,248
4	Fiorentina	38,276
5	Juventus	33,929
6	Bologna	30,169
7	Udinese	28,660
8	Torino	24,294
9	Avellino	24,115
10	Cagliari	21,979
11	Brescia	19,924
12	Pistoiese	15,757
13	Ascoli	15,278
14	Catanzaro	13,742
15	Como	13,181
16	Perugia	12,875

== References and sources ==
- Almanacco Illustrato del Calcio - La Storia 1898-2004, Panini Edizioni, Modena, September 2005
