= Andrea Razzitti =

Italian footballer (born 1989)

Personal information
- Date of birth: 12 March 1989 (age 37)
- Place of birth: Lovere, Italy
- Height: 1.86 m (6 ft 1 in)
- Position: Forward

Team information
- Current team: Lumezzane

Senior career*
Years	Team	Apps	(Gls)
2010–2011	Darfo Boario	24	(2)
2011–2014	Aurora Seriate	75	(30)
2014–2016	Brescia	8	(0)
2015–2016	→ Catanzaro (loan)	48	(16)
2016–2017	Piacenza	28	(7)
2017	Viterbese	16	(5)
2018	Bassano Virtus	7	(0)
2018–2019	LR Vicenza	4	(1)
2019	AlbinoLeffe	9	(1)
2020	Franciacorta FC	2	(1)
2020–	Lumezzane	3	(1)
- * Club domestic league appearances and goals as of 19:10, 7 February 2021 (UTC)

Andrea Razzitti (born 12 March 1989) is an Italian football player who plays as a striker for Lumezzane.

== Club career ==
He made his Serie B debut for Brescia on 20 September 2014 in a game against Ternana.

On 17 January 2018, he was signed by Serie C side Bassano.

On 31 January 2019, he joined AlbinoLeffe.
