= 1970–71 Serie B =

Italian football league season

Serie B
- Season: 1970–71
- Champions: Mantova; 1st title

Serie B 1970-71 team distribution

The Serie B 1970–71 was the thirty-ninth tournament of this competition played in Italy since its creation.

== Teams ==
Novara, Massese and Casertana had been promoted from Serie C, while Brescia, Palermo and Bari had been relegated from Serie A.

== Final classification ==
Pos	Team	Pld	W	D	L	GF	GA	GD	Pts	Promotion or relegation
1	Mantova (P, C)	38	17	14	7	40	24	+16	48	Promotion to Serie A
2	Atalanta (P)	38	15	17	6	41	25	+16	47	Serie A after tie-breaker
3	Catanzaro (P)	38	17	13	8	37	27	+10	47	Serie A after tie-breaker
4	Bari	38	19	9	10	43	24	+19	47	Promotion tie-breaker
5	Brescia	38	15	16	7	39	27	+12	46	
6	Perugia	38	15	12	11	36	28	+8	42	
7	Arezzo	38	13	13	12	40	33	+7	39	
8	Reggina	38	12	14	12	24	28	−4	38	
9	Modena	38	12	14	12	31	37	−6	38	
10	Como	38	12	14	12	35	43	−8	38	
11	Novara	38	11	15	12	37	34	+3	37	
12	Ternana	38	11	15	12	35	32	+3	37	
13	Palermo	38	8	21	9	33	33	0	37	
14	Livorno	38	10	16	12	21	25	−4	36	
15	Monza	38	9	17	12	31	38	−7	35	
16	Cesena (Note: 2 points deducted.)	38	10	15	13	25	29	−4	33	
17	Taranto	38	6	20	12	27	34	−7	32	
18	Pisa (R)	38	9	14	15	31	44	−13	32	Relegation to Serie C
19	Casertana (R)	38	6	15	17	32	50	−18	27	Relegation to Serie C
20	Massese (R)	38	4	14	20	20	43	−23	22	Relegation to Serie C

Source: Panini
(C) Champions; (P) Promoted; (R) Relegated

== Results ==
Home \ Away	ARE	ATA	BAR	BRE	CST	CTZ	CES	COM	LIV	MAN	MAS	MOD	MON	NOV	PAL	PER	PIS	REG	TAR	TER
Arezzo		0–0	0–0	0–0	4–1	0–1	2–1	4–0	2–1	4–0	2–1	1–1	1–3	1–0	0–0	2–1	3–0	1–0	1–1	2–0
Atalanta	0–0		2–2	2–2	3–0	3–0	1–0	0–0	2–0	0–1	2–1	1–0	0–0	3–1	1–1	1–0	3–0	3–1	1–0	3–0
Bari	1–1	0–0		2–1	3–1	2–0	2–0	3–0	3–0	0–0	2–0	1–0	1–0	0–0	2–0	1–0	1–0	3–0	2–1	2–0
Brescia	1–1	0–0	1–0		3–1	0–0	0–0	4–1	2–1	1–0	1–1	1–0	2–1	2–0	1–0	1–2	2–0	1–1	1–1	1–0
Casertana	2–0	1–1	1–1	3–1		0–0	1–1	1–1	0–1	0–1	0–1	3–0	1–1	1–0	3–1	0–0	3–1	1–1	1–1	3–3
Catanzaro	2–1	1–0	1–0	2–0	1–0		1–0	3–1	2–1	0–1	1–0	0–0	1–1	3–0	3–0	1–0	1–0	1–1	1–1	2–1
Cesena	1–0	0–0	2–1	0–1	3–1	0–0		0–2	1–1	1–1	1–1	1–0	1–2	1–1	1–0	1–0	2–1	1–0	0–1	1–0
Como	2–2	1–4	1–0	0–0	1–1	3–2	0–0		1–0	2–0	3–1	1–2	0–0	2–1	0–0	0–0	2–0	2–0	1–0	2–1
Livorno	1–0	0–0	0–1	0–0	1–0	0–1	1–1	2–0		0–0	1–0	0–0	2–0	1–0	0–0	0–1	0–0	1–0	1–1	0–0
Mantova	2–1	0–0	1–1	1–0	1–0	1–1	0–0	2–0	3–1		2–1	3–0	0–0	1–1	1–1	4–1	2–0	4–0	0–2	1–0
Massese	0–1	0–1	0–2	0–0	2–0	1–1	1–0	1–1	0–0	0–3		1–1	1–0	1–2	1–1	1–1	0–1	0–0	0–0	0–2
Modena	2–0	3–4	1–0	1–0	0–0	1–0	0–0	1–1	0–0	0–0	1–0		1–1	3–1	1–1	1–1	4–2	1–0	1–0	0–4
Monza	1–1	2–0	0–0	0–2	1–1	2–0	1–0	1–3	1–0	0–0	2–0	0–2		1–1	0–2	3–2	0–0	0–0	3–2	1–1
Novara	0–0	2–0	1–0	0–2	0–0	0–1	1–2	1–0	1–1	2–1	1–1	1–0	1–0		1–1	2–0	7–1	2–0	0–0	3–0
Palermo	1–0	2–0	4–0	1–1	0–0	1–1	1–1	4–1	1–1	0–0	3–1	0–1	1–1	0–0		1–0	1–1	0–1	1–1	0–0
Perugia	2–0	0–0	1–2	2–0	1–0	2–0	1–0	1–0	0–0	0–1	0–0	3–1	4–1	0–0	2–0		1–0	1–0	2–1	1–0
Pisa	3–1	4–0	1–2	1–1	3–1	0–0	0–0	0–0	0–0	2–0	2–1	0–0	2–0	1–0	1–1	1–1		0–1	2–1	1–1
Reggina	0–1	0–0	1–0	0–0	3–0	1–0	0–0	1–0	1–0	0–0	1–0	1–1	1–0	1–1	3–0	1–1	1–0		2–1	0–0
Taranto	0–0	0–0	1–0	1–1	2–0	1–1	2–1	0–0	0–1	0–1	0–0	2–0	0–0	1–1	1–2	0–0	0–0	0–0		1–1
Ternana	1–0	0–0	1–0	1–2	2–0	1–1	1–0	0–0	0–1	2–1	1–0	2–0	1–1	1–1	0–0	1–1	0–0	1–0	5–1	

Source: Almanacco Illustrato del Calcio - La Storia 1898-2004, Panini Edizioni, Modena, September 2005 (in Italian)
Legend: Blue = home team win; Yellow = draw; Red = away team win.

== Promotion tie-breaker ==
Team 1	Score	Team 2
Atalanta (Italy)	2-0	(Italy) Bari
Atalanta (Italy)	1-0	(Italy) Catanzaro
Bari (Italy)	0-1	(Italy) Catanzaro

Atalanta and Catanzaro promoted to Serie A.

== Attendances ==
#	Club	Average
1	Bari	15,519
2	Atalanta	14,982
3	Palermo	12,678
4	Brescia	9,892
5	Taranto	9,380
6	Livorno	9,070
7	Mantova	8,535
8	Modena	7,951
9	Pisa	6,943
10	Ternana	6,678
11	Perugia	5,851
12	Reggina	5,797
13	Cesena	5,497
14	Arezzo	5,375
15	Catanzaro	5,283
16	Como	5,038
17	Novara	4,649
18	Casertana	4,632
19	Monza	4,334
20	Massese	3,458

== References and sources ==
- Almanacco Illustrato del Calcio - La Storia 1898-2004, Panini Edizioni, Modena, September 2005

Specific
