= Simone Masini =

Italian footballer and manager

Personal information
- Date of birth: 23 October 1984 (age 42)
- Place of birth: Pisa, Italy
- Height: 1.82 m (6 ft 0 in)
- Position: Forward

Youth career
- Lucchese

Senior career*
Years	Team	Apps	(Gls)
2001–2008	Lucchese	147	(38)
2005	→ Cesena (loan)	12	(2)
2008–2011	Ascoli	17	(0)
2009–2010	→ Lanciano (loan)	25	(4)
2011	→ Monza (loan)	10	(1)
2011–2013	Catanzaro	57	(26)
2013–2014	Mantova	32	(12)
2014–2015	Reggina	31	(1)
2015–2016	Melfi	22	(7)
2016–2017	Fano	24	(4)
2017–2018	Tuttocuoio	33	(2)

International career
2003–2004	Italy U-20	5	(0)
2005	Italy U-21 Serie B	1	(0)
2005	Italy Mediterranean	3	(1)

Managerial career
- 2018–2019: Tuttocuoio
- * Club domestic league appearances and goals

Simone Masini (born 23 October 1984) is an Italian retired footballer and current manager. Masini spent most of his career in Italian third tier (Serie C1, Lega Pro Prima Divisione, Lega Pro Divisione Unica).

== Biography ==
=== Lucchese ===
Born in Pisa, Tuscany, Masini started his professional career in Lucchese, about 17 km away. He scored 10 goals in 2003–04 Serie C1 but scored once next season. On 31 January 2005 he left for Serie B club Cesena in exchange with Giuseppe De Feudis, a day after winning Acireale as substitute. Masini returned to Lucca on 1 July 2005, scored 24 goals in 3 Serie C1 seasons.

=== Ascoli ===
On 10 July 2008 he left for Serie B club Ascoli in co-ownership deal. In June 2009 Lucchese transferred the remain 50% registration rights to Ascoli.

On 27 July 2009 he left for Lanciano. On 21 July 2010 Ascoli announced that Masini would join Gubbio but never finalized. In October 2010 Ascoli re-registered Masini as no.6 after just played for Ascoli in pre-season. On 31 January 2011, he swapped club with Giovanni Kyeremateng. Monza was struggling to avoid relegation as the team was at the second from the bottom in round 21. He scored in his debut against Bassano, losing 1–2. The coach then continued to use Masini paired with team topscorer Carlo Ferrario. However he failed to score again and losing his starting place.

=== Catanzaro ===
On 31 August 2011 he was signed by Catanzaro on loan with an option to purchase.

=== Mantova ===
In summer 2013 Masini was signed by Mantova.

=== Lega Pro clubs ===
On 4 September 2015 Masini was signed by Melfi in a one-year contract.

=== International career ===
He capped for feeder teams of Italy U-21: the Italy U-20 team and Italy under-21 Serie B representative team in 2003–04 and 2004–05 season. He also capped for Italy U-21 B team especially for 2005 Mediterranean Games and for a preparation match against Serie D Best XI before the tournament.

=== Coaching career ===
On 23 May 2018, the president of Tuttocuoio announced, that Masini would be the club's new manager starting from the 2018/19 season. After three defeats in the last four games, Masini was fired on 17 January 2019.
