= Sebastián Bueno =

Argentine footballer

Personal information
- Full name: Sebastián Andrés Bueno
- Date of birth: 24 October 1981 (age 45)
- Place of birth: Junín, Buenos Aires, Argentina
- Position: Forward

Youth career
- 1986–1998: B.A.P.
- 1996: → Sarmiento (loan)
- 1997: → Gimnasia LP (loan)

Senior career*
Years	Team	Apps	(Gls)
1998	B.A.P.	–	(–)
1999–2001	Sarmiento	54	(22)
2001–2002	Banfield	22	(3)
2002–2003	Quilmes	8	(1)
2003	Unión Santa Fe	10	(1)
2004	Deportes La Serena	2	(0)
2004–2005	San Martín SJ	0	(0)
2006	Inter de Limeira	–	(–)
2006–2007	Catanzaro	21	(16)
2008–2011	Benevento	66	(12)
2011–2012	Perugia	19	(2)
2013–2014	Sanjustino	24	(5)

International career
2001	Argentina U20		

Managerial career
- 2016–2019: Sanjustino
- * Club domestic league appearances and goals

Sebastián Andrés Bueno (born 24 October 1981) is an Argentine former footballer who played as a forward.

== Club career ==
Born in Junín, Buenos Aires, Bueno was with club Buenos Aires al Pacífico (B.A.P.), Sarmiento de Junín and Gimnasia La Plata as a youth player. After winning the Liga Deportiva del Oeste with B.A.P., Bueno started his professional career at hometown club Sarmiento de Junín. In 2001–02 Apertura (opening) season, he was signed by top division club Banfield which also located in the Greater Buenos Aires. In the next season, he moved to Primera B Nacional side Quilmes. In the 2003 Apertura season (2003–04 "opening" season), he moved to league rival Unión de Santa Fe. In 2004, he moved to Chile for Primera División side La Serena, which is the Chilean "Apertura" season. He then returned to Argentina for San Martín de San Juan in Clausura 2005 and in March 2006 left for Brazilian side Inter de Limeira for Campeonato Paulista Série A2. In October 2006, he left for Italian Serie C2 side Catanzaro. Due to Bueno has EU nationality, he could able to sign by Italian lower division, which the lower divisions club could not signed a non-EU player from abroad. He scored 16 goals in the first season, but in the second season, he just scored 3 times before joined Benevento in January 2008.

In September 2011 he joined Perugia

== International career ==
Bueno had call-up to 2001 FIFA World Youth Championship., because of an injury suffered by Chori Domínguez. He won the Champion as unused member.

== Coaching career ==
Following his retirement, Bueno served as manager of Club Sanjustino.

== Personal life ==
Bueno is the great nephew of Osvaldo Zubeldía, died in 1982.
