= 1958–59 Serie C =

Italian football league season

The 1958–59 Serie C was the twenty-first edition of Serie C, the third highest league in the Italian football league system. There were no relegations in order to expand the league to three groups. The expansion was decided by the FIGC.

== Girone A ==
=== Final classification ===
Pos	Team	Pld	W	D	L	GF	GA	GD	Pts	Promotion or relegation
1	Ozo Mantova (P)	40	24	10	6	71	28	+43	58	1959–60 Serie B
2	Siena	40	24	10	6	58	27	+31	58	Tie-breaker
3	Spezia	40	20	10	10	53	38	+15	50	
4	Biellese	40	18	12	10	49	39	+10	48	
5	Livorno	40	19	8	13	57	41	+16	46	
6	Ravenna	40	16	13	11	42	38	+4	45	
7	Pro Vercelli	40	15	12	13	43	39	+4	42	
8	Sanremese	40	16	9	15	57	52	+5	41	
9	Treviso	40	15	11	14	41	40	+1	41	
10	Pisa	40	12	17	11	40	43	−3	41	
11	Forlì	40	14	12	14	36	34	+2	40	
12	Pro Patria	40	12	15	13	42	39	+3	39	
13	Carbosarda	40	15	9	16	45	46	−1	39	
14	Varese	30	10	15	5	47	38	+9	35	
15	Casale	40	10	15	15	38	48	−10	35	
16	Mestrina	40	11	13	16	42	53	−11	35	
17	Lucchese	40	11	11	18	32	47	−15	33	
18	Legnano	40	9	13	18	49	66	−17	31	
19	Piacenza	40	8	13	19	31	54	−23	29	
20	Cremonese	40	11	7	22	41	75	−34	29	
21	Pordenone	40	8	9	23	40	69	−29	25	

Source: rsssf.com
(P) Promoted

=== Promotion tie-breaker ===
Team 1	Score	Team 2
Ozo Mantova	1-0	Siena

Ozo Mantova promoted to Serie B.

== Girone B ==
=== Final classification ===
Pos	Team	Pld	W	D	L	GF	GA	GD	Pts	Promotion or relegation
1	Catanzaro (P)	34	17	13	4	56	15	+41	47	Promoted to Serie B
2	Cosenza	34	18	10	6	43	27	+16	46	
3	Fedit Roma	34	15	9	10	48	35	+13	39	
4	Chieti	34	14	11	9	41	37	+4	39	
5	Trapani	34	14	10	10	38	29	+9	38	
6	Lecce	34	15	8	11	61	53	+8	38	
7	Barletta	34	16	4	14	52	48	+4	36	
8	Arezzo	34	12	12	10	37	42	−5	36	
9	Reggina	34	13	9	12	35	34	+1	35	
10	Marsala	34	12	9	13	48	40	+8	33	
11	Anconitana	34	10	12	12	41	42	−1	32	
12	Foggia	34	9	12	13	33	36	−3	30	
13	L'Aquila	34	11	8	15	32	40	−8	30	
14	Pescara	34	11	6	17	31	38	−7	28	
15	Casertana	34	9	9	16	33	38	−5	27	
16	Cirio	34	9	9	16	36	53	−17	27	
17	Siracusa	34	8	11	15	27	60	−33	27	
18	Salernitana	34	8	8	18	29	54	−25	24	

Source: rsssf.com
(P) Promoted
