= Renzo Rossi =

Italian footballer

Personal information
- Date of birth: 23 January 1951 (age 75)
- Place of birth: Giacciano con Baruchella, Italy
- Height: 1.76 m (5 ft 9 1/2 in)
- Position: Striker

Senior career*
Years	Team	Apps	(Gls)
1969–1970	Passirio Merano	25	(?)
1970–1971	Mecobo Asti	20	(4)
1971–1973	Oltrisarco	59	(13)
1973–1974	Como	38	(7)
1974–1975	Internazionale	8	(1)
1975–1976	Como	27	(2)
1976–1977	Lazio	15	(4)
1977–1979	Catanzaro	57	(13)
1979–1982	Taranto	57	(3)
- * Club domestic league appearances and goals

Renzo Rossi (born 23 January 1951 in Giacciano con Baruchella) is a retired Italian professional footballer who played as a forward.

== Career ==
Rossi began playing football with local side Passirio Merano. After spells with lower-level sides Astimacobi, Oltrisarco and Como, he joined Internazionale in 1974, where he would make his Serie A debut against Milan on 10 November 1974.
