= Gianni Bui =

Italian footballer and coach

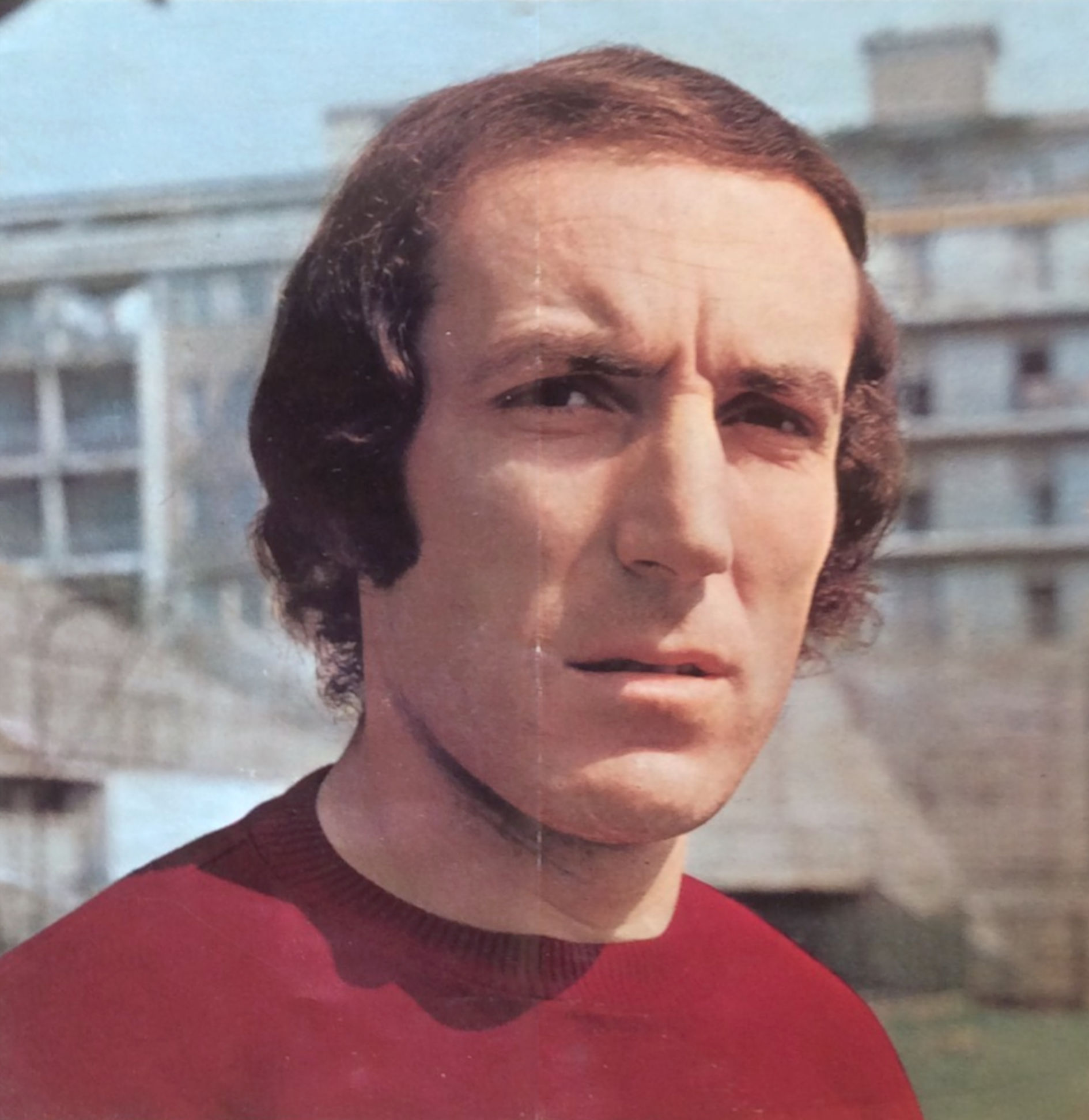
- Bui with Torino in the 1971–72 season

Personal information
- Full name: Gianni Alessio Bui
- Date of birth: 5 May 1940 (age 86)
- Place of birth: Serramazzoni, Italy
- Height: 1.85 m (6 ft 1 in)
- Position: Striker

Youth career
- Lazio

Senior career*
Years	Team	Apps	(Gls)
1959–1960	Cirio	15	(6)
1960–1961	Lazio	5	(0)
1961–1962	Pisa	31	(20)
1962–1964	SPAL	52	(13)
1964–1965	Bologna	3	(0)
1965–1967	Catanzaro	67	(33)
1967–1970	Verona	82	(32)
1970–1974	Torino	77	(20)
1974–1975	Milan	2	(0)
1975–1976	Varese	2	(0)

Managerial career
- 1978–1979: Genoa
- 1981–1982: Rende
- 1986–1988: Pavia
- 1988–1991: Chievo
- 1991–1992: Pavia
- 1992–1993: Casale
- 1993–1994: Giorgione
- 1994–1995: Venezia
- 1996–1998: Valenzana
- * Club domestic league appearances and goals

Gianni Alessio Bui (born 5 May 1940 in Serramazzoni) is an Italian former professional football manager and player. He played as a forward.

== Career ==
=== Players ===
Bui played 11 seasons (188 games, 53 goals) in the Italian Serie A for Lazio, SPAL, Bologna, Verona, Torino, and Milan.

=== Managers ===
During his managerial career, Bui coached several teams, including Genoa, Chievo, and Venezia.

== Career statistics ==
=== Club ===
Appearances and goals by club, season and competition
Club	Season	League			Cup		Continental		Other		Total	
Club	Season	Division	Apps	Goals	Apps	Goals	Apps	Goals	Apps	Goals	Apps	Goals
Cirio	1959–60	Serie C	15	6	—		—		—		15	6
Lazio	1960–61	Serie A	5	0	1	0	—		—		6	0
Pisa	1961–62	Serie C	31	11	—		—		—		31	11
SPAL	1962–63	Serie A	28	8	0	0	—		—		28	8
SPAL	1963–64	Serie A	24	5	1	0	—		—		25	5
SPAL	Total		52	13	1	0	—		—		52	13
Bologna	1964–65	Serie A	3	1	0	0	—		—		3	1
Catanzaro	1965–66	Serie B	34	18	3	4	—		—		37	22
Catanzaro	1966–67	Serie B	33	15	0	0	—		—		33	15
Catanzaro	Total		67	33	3	4	—		—		70	37
Verona	1967–68	Serie B	33	13	2	0	—		—		35	13
Verona	1968–69	Serie A	26	15	2	1	—		—		28	16
Verona	1969–70	Serie A	23	5	3	1	2 (Note: Appearances in Mitropa Cup.)	0	—		28	6
Verona	Total		82	33	7	2	2	0	—		91	35
Torino	1970–71	Serie A	24	6	5	1	1 (Note: Appearances in Mitropa Cup.)	0	—		30	7
Torino	1971–72	Serie A	18	9	4	1	2 (Note: Appearances in European Cup Winners' Cup.)	0	—		24	10
Torino	1972–73	Serie A	20	4	3	0	2 (Note: Appearances in UEFA Cup.)	0	—		25	4
Torino	1973–74	Serie A	16	1	4	1	2	1	—		22	3
Torino	Total		78	20	16	3	7	1	—		101	24
Milan	1974–75	Serie A	2	0	4	0	—		—		6	0
Varese	1975–76	Serie B	2	0	0	0	—		—		2	9
Career Total			337	117	32	9	9	1	—		378	127

== Honours ==
=== Player ===
Torino

- Coppa Italia: 1970–71

==== Individual ====
- Serie B top scorer: 1965–66 (18 goals)
- Torino FC Hall of Fame: 2021

=== Manager ===
==== Chievo ====
- Serie C2: 1988–89
