= Angelo Orazi =

Italian footballer and coach (born 1951)

Personal information
- Date of birth: September 12, 1951 (age 75)
- Place of birth: Spoleto, Italy
- Height: 1.72 m (5 ft 7 1/2 in)
- Position: Midfielder

Senior career*
Years	Team	Apps	(Gls)
1968–1969	Roma	2	(0)
1969–1972	Verona	82	(7)
1972–1976	Roma	53	(5)
1976–1978	Pescara	62	(5)
1978–1981	Catanzaro	77	(2)
1981–1983	Udinese	48	(4)
1983–1985	Campania		
1985–1986	Benevento		

International career
1969–1972	Italy U-21	8	(0)

Managerial career
- 1987–1989: Cynthia
- 1989–1990: Campania
- 1990–1991: Ternana
- 1991–1992: Giarre
- 1992–1993: Palermo
- 1993–1994: Ascoli
- 1995–1996: Savoia
- 1996: Atletico Catania
- 1998: Avezzano
- 1999: Chieti
- 1999–2000: Marsala
- 2000–2001: Lodigiani
- * Club domestic league appearances and goals

Angelo Orazi (born September 12, 1951) is an Italian professional football coach and a former player.

== Career ==
Orazi began playing football with Roma, where he made his Serie A debut against Napoli on 23 February 1969. He played for 14 seasons (291 games, 19 goals) in the Serie A for A.S. Roma, Hellas Verona F.C., Delfino Pescara 1936, F.C. Catanzaro and Udinese Calcio.

A knee injury sustained in a collision with Luciano Re Cecconi prevented him from being selected as a candidate for the 1974 FIFA World Cup Italian squad.

== Honours ==
- Coppa Italia winner: 1968/69.
