= Antonio Sabato (footballer) =

Italian footballer (born 1958)

Personal information
- Date of birth: 9 January 1958 (age 68)
- Place of birth: Novara di Sicilia, Italy
- Height: 1.72 m (5 ft 7 1/2 in)
- Position: Midfielder

Senior career*
Years	Team	Apps	(Gls)
1976–1985	Internazionale	80	(3)
1977–1979	→ Forlì (loan)	58	(3)
1979–1980	→ Sambenedettese (loan)	16	(0)
1980–1982	→ Catanzaro (loan)	58	(6)
1985–1989	Torino	114	(4)
1989–1991	Ascoli	60	(3)
1991–1994	Alessandria	79	(0)

International career
1984	Italy	4	(0)
- * Club domestic league appearances and goals

Antonio Sabato (Italian pronunciation: [anˈtɔːnjo ˈsaːbato]; born 9 January 1958) is a retired Italian professional football player, who played as a midfielder. He was usually deployed as an attacking midfielder, or as a winger on either flank, due to his ambidexterity. He currently works as a pundit.

== Club career ==
Sabato made his career debut with Inter in 1976, making his Serie A debut on 7 November against Torino. In 1977, at the age of 19, he was sent on loan to Forlì for two seasons in Serie C. As a starter, he played a leading role in helping the team gain promotion to Serie C1. During the 1979–80 season, he played in Serie B on loan with Sambenedettese, making 16 appearances. In 1980, he went on loan to Caranzaro for two seasons in Serie A, where he became a permanent member of the starting line-up. He was called back by Inter in 1982, where he became a valuable member of the starting line-up. Due to his difficulties with Inter teammate Liam Brady, he moved to Torino during the 1985–86 season, where he spent four seasons, moving to Ascoli for two seasons in 1989, following the club into Serie B. He ended his career after moving to Serie C club Alessandria in 1991, spending two seasons at the club. In total, he made 283 appearances in Serie A, scoring 14 goals, also making 46 appearances in Serie B, scoring 2 goals, and 58 appearances in Serie C, scoring 3 goals.

== International career ==
Antonio Sabato represented the Italy under-20 side at the 1977 FIFA World Youth Championship. He made his debut with the Under-21 Italian side under Azeglio Vicini, on 6 October 1982, in a 1–1 draw against Austria. At the end of that season, he also made his debut for the Italy Under-23 Olympic side under Cesare Maldini, and he participated both in the qualifying games for the 1984 Olympics in Los Angeles, as well as in the final tournament, where Italy finished in fourth place, behind Yugoslavia, after reaching the semi-finals. He made his senior debut for Italy on 3 March 1984, in a 2–1 win over Turkey, replacing Giuseppe Dossena. He also played in a 2–0 win over Canada, a 0–0 draw against the United States, and in a 1–0 win over Switzerland, where he made his first starting appearance for Italy, coming off for Ubaldo Righetti in the 77th minute. In total, Sabato was capped 4 times for the senior national side in 1984, 11 times with the Olympic side, and once with the Under-21 side.

== Honours ==
- Represented Italy at the 1984 Summer Olympics.
