= Giorgio Pellizzaro =

Italian footballer (1947–2025)

Personal information
- Date of birth: 16 August 1947
- Place of birth: Mantua, Italy
- Date of death: 9 February 2025 (aged 77)
- Place of death: Brescia, Italy
- Position(s): Goalkeeper

Senior career*
Years	Team	Apps	(Gls)
1967–1970	Mantova	50	(0)
1970–1973	Sampdoria	11	(0)
1973–1978	Catanzaro	148	(0)
1978–1979	Foggia	19	(0)
1979–1980	Forlì	29	(0)
1980–1984	Brescia	49	(0)
- * Club domestic league appearances and goals

Giorgio Pellizzaro (16 August 1947 – 9 February 2025) was an Italian football goalkeeper and goalkeeper coach.

== Early life ==
Pellizzaro was born in Mantua, Italy on 16 August 1947. He had a sister and a brother. He was born in Mantua, Italy, and lived over thirty years in Brescia, Italy.

== Playing career ==
In 1973, Pellizzaro signed for Italian second-tier side Catanzaro, helping the club achieve promotion to the Italian Serie A.

Pellizzaro was known for his reflexes.

== Managerial career ==
After retiring from professional football, Pellizzaro worked as a goalkeeper coach.

== Personal life and death ==
Pellizzaro had three children. He died in Brescia, Italy on 9 February 2025, at the age of 77.
