= Enrico Nicolini =

Italian footballer and manager (born 1955)

Personal information
- Full name: Enrico Nicolini
- Date of birth: 16 January 1955 (age 71)
- Place of birth: Genoa, Italy
- Position: Midfielder

Youth career
- Sampdoria

Senior career*
Years	Team	Apps	(Gls)
1972–1976	Sampdoria	26	(0)
1976–1980	Catanzaro	101	(6)
1980–1981	Napoli	29	(1)
1981–1985	Ascoli	114	(10)
1985–1987	Bologna	64	(6)
1987–1989	Catanzaro	58	(1)

Managerial career
- 1990–1992: Novara
- 1992–1993: Vigor Lamezia
- 1993: Palermo
- 1994–1995: Catanzaro
- 1995–1997: Ascoli
- 1997: Siena
- 1998–2000: Gualdo
- 2002: Sambenedettese
- 2005: Alessandria
- * Club domestic league appearances and goals

Enrico Nicolini (born 16 January 1955) is an Italian professional former footballer and manager. He currently assists CFR Cluj coach Andrea Mandorlini.

== Playing career ==
Nicolini grew up in the U.C. Sampdoria youth team and made his debut in Serie A in 1972. He won promotion to Serie A with Catanzaro in 1978.

He collected 237 matches in Serie A, scoring 25 goals, and 155 matches in Serie B, scoring 9 goals.

== Coaching career ==
Nicolini started a career as coach in 1990, managing Novara in Serie C2.

Later he assisted Carlo Mazzone during his work at Brescia and then joined Andrea Mandorlini's staff at CFR Cluj in Romania.
