= Piero Braglia =

Italian footballer and manager

Personal information
- Date of birth: 10 January 1955 (age 71)
- Place of birth: Grosseto, Italy
- Position: Midfielder

Team information
- Current team: Gubbio (head coach)

Senior career*
Years	Team	Apps	(Gls)
1973–1975	Montevarchi	59	(7)
1975–1976	Cremonese	7	(0)
1976–1978	Fiorentina	23	(0)
1978–1984	Catanzaro	142	(4)
1984–1985	Triestina	?	(?)
1985–1987	Catania	?	(?)

Managerial career
- 1989–1990: Bibbienese
- 1990–1992: Colligiana
- 1992–1993: Rondinella
- 1993–1994: Sangiovannese
- 1994–1996: Montevarchi
- 1996–1997: Pontedera
- 1997–1998: Carrarese
- 1998–1999: Sangiovannese
- 1999–2000: Foggia
- 2000–2001: Montevarchi
- 2001–2003: Chieti
- 2003–2005: Catanzaro
- 2005–2006: Sangiovannese
- 2006–2007: Pisa
- 2007–2008: Lucchese
- 2008–2009: Frosinone
- 2009: Taranto
- 2010–2013: Juve Stabia
- 2014: Juve Stabia
- 2014–2015: Pisa
- 2015–2016: Lecce
- 2016–2017: Alessandria
- 2017–2020: Cosenza
- 2020–2022: Avellino
- 2022–2024: Gubbio
- 2024–2025: Campobasso
- 2025: Perugia
- 2026: Pontedera
- 2026–: Gubbio
- * Club domestic league appearances and goals

Piero Braglia (born 10 January 1955) is an Italian football manager and former player, currently in charge of Serie C Group B club Gubbio.

== Career ==
=== Playing ===
A midfielder, Braglia started his professional career with Serie C team Montevarchi, then making his debut in the Serie A in 1976 with Fiorentina. He then spent six seasons with Catanzaro, five of them in the Italian top flight. He then retired in 1987 after spells with Serie B teams Triestina and Catania.

=== Coaching ===
In 1989, Braglia accepted his first managerial job, at the helm of amateur Tuscan team Bibbienese. He then coached several Tuscan teams in the lower ranks of Italian football with some success, including a Serie C2 title with Montevarchi in 1995.

In 1999, he accepted his first coaching job outside of Tuscany, becoming head coach of Foggia in the Serie C2, obtaining a fourth place in the final table. He then returned to Tuscany, again to Montevarchi, before joining Chieti, which he led for two seasons in the Serie C1 league. In 2003–04, he returned to Catanzaro, this time as a head coach, and led the giallorossi to win the Serie C1 title and establish them back in Serie B after over a decade in the lower tiers. He was, however, sacked during the club's following Serie B campaign due to poor results. He then returned to Tuscany, joining Sangiovannese, a team he had already twice in the Serie D during his early coaching years, and achieving an impressive third place in their Serie C1 campaign. In 2006, he accepted an offer from Pisa, with the aim to lead the nerazzurri back to Serie B: a third place in the regular season, followed by a successful campaign in the promotion playoffs, assured Pisa and Braglia a place in the second-highest Italian league for the next season. However, after discussions with the club management, Braglia left Pisa and accepted an offer from Lucchese, another Tuscan Serie C1 team aiming for promotion. However, despite this, Lucchese ended only in eighth place and failed to qualify for the promotion playoffs.

In June 2008, Braglia was unveiled as head coach of Serie B team Frosinone, replacing Alberto Cavasin.

In June 2009, Piero Braglia went to Taranto but was removed weeks later due to poor results. In June 2010, he was announced as the new head coach of Juve Stabia, which he led to a surprise promotion to Serie B via the playoffs. He was then confirmed as Juve Stabia boss for the 2011–12 second division campaign, where he guided his small club to an impressive first half season and an excellent ninth place by the end of the season. Another safe season followed, with Juve Stabia keeping its Serie B status for one more year. These fortunes did not repeat in the 2013–14 season, as Juve Stabia immediately appeared unable to escape relegation, and Braglia was fired in November 2013 to be replaced with Fulvio Pea; after Pea failed to improve results, Braglia was however called back at Juve Stabia, but could not do anything to avoid Lega Pro relegation to his club.

In July 2014, Braglia agreed a comeback at the helm of Pisa, seven years after he guided them to what was the last Serie B promotion to date for the Nerazzurri of Tuscany.

On 12 October 2015, he became the head coach of Lecce. He led the club to third place and thus entered the play-off round, which Lecce lost in the semifinal.

On 15 June 2016, he was appointed the new manager of Alessandria. He was exonerated on 15 April 2017, three days before the end, due to the sudden collapse of results that led to overtaking the Cremonese at the top of Group A Lega Pro after a lengthy domination of the Piedmont team.

On 27 September 2017 he was hired as the head coach of Cosenza in the Serie C. With the Calabrian club, on 16 June 2018, he won the final of the Serie C playoffs against Robur Siena, with a score of 3–1 at the Stadio Adriatico in Pescara. Thus, Cosenza returns to Serie B after 15 years.

During his first season in charge at the club in Serie B, he comfortably succeeded in keeping Cosenza in the safer spots of the league table, ending in tenth place, just four points shy of a promotion playoff spot. However, the 2019–20 Serie B campaign did not prove to be as successful, and Braglia was sacked on 10 February 2020 following a 0–1 home loss to Benevento, which left Cosenza in the deep relegation zone (18th place).

In July 2020 he was appointed at the helm of Serie C club Avellino. Braglia served in charge of the Biancoverdi until 16 February 2022, when he was dismissed, together with director of football Salvatore Di Somma, following a 0–1 defeat to Virtus Francavilla.

On 17 June 2022, Braglia was announced as the new head coach of Serie C club Gubbio. After two seasons in charge of Gubbio, Braglia resigned by the end of the club's 2023–24 campaign.

On 1 July 2024, Braglia signed for newly promoted Serie C club Campobasso, agreeing to a one-year contract with an automatic extension in case of qualification to the promotion playoffs. He was sacked on 26 January 2025.

On 21 September 2025, Braglia was named new head coach of Serie C club Perugia, resigning just less than a month later, on 19 October, after five games in charge.

On 13 February 2026, Braglia agreed to return in charge of Pontedera, with the club dead last in the Group B of the 2025–26 Serie C. The club was relegated to Serie D at the end of the season and Braglia left Pontedera.

On 4 October 2026, Braglia was hired by Gubbio in Serie C.
