= 1977–78 Serie B =

Italian football league season

Serie B
- Season: 1977–78
- Champions: Ascoli; 1st title

Serie B 1977-78 team distribution

The Serie B 1977–78 was the forty-sixth tournament of this competition played in Italy since its creation.

== Teams ==
Cremonese, Pistoiese and Bari had been promoted from Serie C, while Sampdoria, Catanzaro and Cesena had been relegated from Serie A.

== Final classification ==
Pos	Team	Pld	W	D	L	GF	GA	GD	Pts	Promotion or relegation
1	Ascoli (P, C)	38	26	9	3	73	30	+43	61	Promotion to Serie A
2	Catanzaro (P)	38	16	12	10	50	41	+9	44	Promotion to Serie A
3	Avellino (P)	38	15	14	9	34	29	+5	44	Promotion to Serie A
4	Monza	38	14	14	10	36	29	+7	42	
5	Ternana	38	14	14	10	34	27	+7	42	
6	Palermo	38	12	16	10	42	36	+6	40	
7	Lecce	38	12	15	11	27	26	+1	39	
8	Sampdoria	38	12	14	12	41	37	+4	38	
9	Cesena	38	11	16	11	36	33	+3	38	
10	Sambenedettese	38	11	16	11	30	28	+2	38	
11	Taranto	38	10	18	10	31	38	−7	38	
12	Cagliari	38	12	13	13	52	47	+5	37	
13	Bari	38	12	13	13	38	42	−4	37	
14	Brescia	38	9	17	12	35	40	−5	35	
15	Varese	38	10	15	13	34	44	−10	35	
16	Pistoiese	38	12	10	16	33	40	−7	34	
17	Rimini	38	9	16	13	31	39	−8	34	
18	Cremonese (R)	38	9	15	14	34	38	−4	33	Relegation to Serie C1
19	Como (R)	38	8	15	15	25	37	−12	31	Relegation to Serie C1
20	Modena (R)	38	6	8	24	24	59	−35	20	Relegation to Serie C1

Source: Panini
(C) Champions; (P) Promoted; (R) Relegated

== Results ==
Home \ Away	ASC	AVE	BAR	BRE	CAG	CTZ	CES	COM	CRE	LCE	MOD	MON	PAL	PST	RIM	SBN	SAM	TAR	TER	VAR
Ascoli		1–0	2–0	3–0	2–2	3–0	1–1	1–0	5–2	1–0	3–0	1–0	3–2	3–1	2–0	2–1	3–2	2–0	2–0	4–1
Avellino	0–0		0–0	2–1	1–0	1–0	1–2	0–0	1–0	2–1	1–0	0–0	1–1	2–0	0–0	2–1	1–0	0–0	0–0	2–1
Bari	1–3	1–2		3–2	1–1	1–1	2–1	2–1	1–0	0–0	2–1	2–1	1–1	0–0	2–0	2–0	2–0	2–0	1–1	3–0
Brescia	1–1	1–0	0–0		1–2	1–1	3–1	1–0	0–0	1–1	1–1	0–0	3–2	1–0	2–0	0–1	0–0	1–1	0–0	0–0
Cagliari	1–2	1–0	3–1	2–4		1–2	3–1	3–1	2–2	0–0	0–0	2–3	1–1	3–0	1–1	0–0	5–1	2–2	1–2	4–3
Catanzaro	1–2	1–0	2–3	1–1	2–3		1–1	1–0	1–1	3–1	1–0	2–0	3–1	4–2	1–0	3–1	2–0	1–1	1–0	1–0
Cesena	0–0	1–1	2–0	1–1	1–0	0–1		0–0	1–0	0–1	0–0	2–0	2–0	2–1	1–1	0–0	2–1	1–1	0–0	3–0
Como	1–2	2–1	0–0	1–0	0–1	1–2	1–1		2–1	1–1	1–1	0–0	1–1	1–0	1–1	0–2	1–0	0–0	0–1	2–1
Cremonese	0–1	0–1	1–1	1–1	1–0	1–1	2–1	3–0		1–1	3–0	0–0	1–1	0–1	1–1	0–0	1–0	2–1	2–1	3–0
Lecce	0–0	1–0	1–0	2–0	2–0	1–0	2–1	0–1	1–0		2–0	0–0	1–0	0–2	0–1	2–1	1–1	0–0	1–1	1–2
Modena	2–3	0–1	2–1	1–2	0–0	2–2	0–1	0–3	2–0	1–0		1–0	0–1	0–4	2–1	1–1	1–3	2–0	1–2	1–4
Monza	4–2	1–1	1–0	2–1	0–0	2–2	1–2	1–0	2–1	1–0	1–0		2–1	0–0	1–1	0–0	0–0	4–0	2–0	1–1
Palermo	1–1	4–1	1–0	1–1	0–0	1–1	1–0	2–0	0–0	1–1	3–1	2–0		2–1	2–0	0–0	0–0	0–0	2–1	0–0
Pistoiese	0–0	2–2	0–0	3–2	1–0	1–2	1–0	0–0	0–0	0–0	1–0	2–0	1–0		1–0	2–0	0–1	1–1	2–1	2–2
Rimini	1–4	1–1	2–0	1–1	3–1	0–0	1–1	1–0	2–1	0–1	1–0	0–1	1–2	1–0		0–0	2–1	1–3	2–0	1–1
Sambenedettese	0–0	0–2	1–1	0–1	1–0	1–0	1–1	2–2	0–1	2–0	5–0	0–0	2–1	3–1	1–1		0–0	0–0	1–0	1–0
Sampdoria	3–2	0–1	4–0	1–0	1–2	2–1	2–2	1–1	3–0	1–1	2–1	1–0	1–1	1–0	1–1	1–0		4–0	1–1	0–0
Taranto	1–3	2–2	1–0	0–0	2–1	0–0	1–0	3–0	0–0	1–0	1–0	1–3	1–2	1–0	1–1	2–0	1–1		1–2	1–0
Ternana	1–0	2–0	2–0	2–0	0–2	2–1	0–0	0–0	1–1	0–0	2–0	1–0	2–1	4–0	0–0	0–1	0–0	0–0		1–1
Varese	0–3	1–1	2–2	2–0	2–2	3–1	1–0	0–0	2–1	0–0	0–0	0–2	1–0	1–0	1–0	0–0	1–0	0–0	0–1	

Source: Almanacco Illustrato del Calcio - La Storia 1898-2004, Panini Edizioni, Modena, September 2005 (in Italian)
Legend: Blue = home team win; Yellow = draw; Red = away team win.

== Attendances ==
#	Club	Average
1	Cagliari	18,666
2	Palermo	18,053
3	Bari	16,726
4	Ascoli	15,987
5	Sampdoria	15,133
6	Taranto	14,487
7	Lecce	11,981
8	Brescia	11,709
9	Ternana	10,329
10	Catanzaro	10,252
11	Avellino	9,423
12	Cesena	9,316
13	Pistoiese	8,977
14	Rimini	7,756
15	Modena	7,469
16	Cremonese	7,367
17	Sambenedettese	6,645
18	Monza	6,039
19	Como	5,573
20	Varese	4,099

== References and sources ==
- Almanacco Illustrato del Calcio - La Storia 1898-2004, Panini Edizioni, Modena, September 2005

Specific
