= Massimo Palanca =

Italian footballer

Personal information
- Full name: Massimo Palanca
- Date of birth: 21 August 1953 (age 73)
- Place of birth: Loreto (AN), Italy
- Height: 1.69 m (5 ft 7 in)
- Position: Striker

Youth career
- Recanatese

Senior career*
| Years | Team | Apps | (Gls) |
| 1971–1973 | Camerino | 40 | (26) |
| 1973–1974 | Frosinone | 28 | (17) |
| 1974–1981 | Catanzaro | 206 | (70) |
| 1981–1982 | Napoli | 14 | (1) |
| 1982–1983 | Como | 18 | (2) |
| 1983–1984 | Napoli | 19 | (1) |
| 1984–1986 | Foligno | 47 | (18) |
| 1986–1990 | Catanzaro | 126 | (45) |
- * Club domestic league appearances and goals

Massimo Palanca (born 21 August 1953) is an Italian former football striker known for his skill at scoring directly from corner-kicks, with two successful spells at US Catanzaro in the mid-seventies and the late eighties.

== Career ==
Palanca was born in Loreto (AN), Italy, and began his professional career at Camerino, transferring to Frosinone the following year where he scored 17 goals in 28 matches.

He transferred to Catanzaro, staying for seven years and scoring 70 goals in 206 matches, being the team's top scorer in Serie B in the 1977–78 season. When Catanzaros was promoted to Serie A, Palanca was again the team's top scorer with 13 goals. A memorable game with Roma in the Stadio Olimpico on 4 March 1979 ended 1–3 to Catanzaro; Palanca scored a hat-trick.

Palanca transferred to Napoli in 1981–82, scoring 1 goal in 14 games. He moved to Como in Serie B the following season where again he scored only 1 goal in 19 matches. After returning to Napoli in 1983–84, he alleged misunderstandings with coach Rino Marchesi. The following two seasons Palanca played at Foligno in Serie C2, scoring 18 goals in 47 matches, after which he returned to Catanzaro.

While back at Catanzaro for the 1986–87 season, Palanca helped the team gain promotion from Serie C1 to Serie B, contributing 17 goals in 29 matches. Over the next three seasons with Catanzaro, he made 97 appearances and scored 28 goals. At the end of the 1989–90 season, Palancas' last in football, Catanzaro finished in 20th position in Serie B; the team was relegated to Serie C1.
