= 2005–06 US Catanzaro season =

U.S. Catanzaro
2005–06 season
- Chairman: Claudio Parente
- Manager: Sergio Buso; Vincenzo Guerini; Bruno Giordano; Franco Cittadino
- Stadium: Stadio Nicola Ceravolo
- Serie B: 22nd (relegated)
- Coppa Italia: Second round

The 2005–06 season was the 77th season in the existence of U.S. Catanzaro and the club's second consecutive season in the second division of Italian football. In addition to the domestic league, Catanzaro participated in this season's edition of the Coppa Italia.

== Squad ==
Note: Flags indicate national team as defined under FIFA eligibility rules; some limited exceptions apply. Players may hold more than one non-FIFA nationality.

No.	Pos.	Nation	Player
—	GK	ITA	Luca Anania
—	GK	ITA	Emanuele Belardi
—	GK	ITA	Salvatore D'Urso
—	DF	ITA	Christian Adami
—	DF	ITA	Domenico Cambareri
—	DF	ITA	Nicodemo Caroleo
—	DF	ITA	Luca Ceccarelli
—	DF	ITA	Stefano De Angelis
—	DF	ITA	Ciro De Franco
—	DF	ITA	Alessandro Del Grosso
—	DF	ITA	Valerio Di Cesare
—	DF	ITA	Fabio Di Sole
—	DF	NGA	Mathew Olorunleke
—	DF	ITA	Alessandro Radi
—	DF	ITA	Simone Rizzato
—	DF	ITA	Andrea Sussi
—	DF	ITA	Orlando Urbano
—	DF	ITA	Emanuele Venturelli
—	DF	ITA	Danilo Zini
—	MF	ITA	Gianpaolo Calzi
—	MF	ITA	Salvatore Cocuzza
—	MF	ITA	Davide Cordone
—	MF	ITA	Daniele De Pascali
—	MF	ITA	Domenico De Simone
—	MF	ITA	Fabrizio Ferrigno

No.	Pos.	Nation	Player
—	MF	ITA	Tommaso Folino
—	MF	ITA	Rocco Giannone
—	MF	ITA	Riccardo Gissi
—	MF	ITA	Carmelo Imbriani
—	MF	ITA	Ruben Mancuso
—	MF	ITA	Fabio Mangiacasale
—	MF	ITA	Salvatore Miceli
—	MF	ITA	Antonio Morello
—	MF	PAR	Raul Nelinho
—	MF	ITA	Carlo Nervo
—	MF	ITA	Andrea Ottonello
—	MF	ITA	Luca Pierotti
—	MF	ITA	Giuseppe Russo
—	MF	ITA	Mariano Scalercio
—	MF	ITA	Davide Tedoldi
—	MF	ITA	Giuseppe Ticli
—	MF	BRA	Ronaldo Vanin
—	FW	ITA	Giorgio Corona
—	FW	ITA	Claudio De Sousa
—	FW	ITA	Giuseppe Greco
—	FW	ITA	Italo Mattioli
—	FW	ALB	Florian Myrtaj
—	FW	ITA	Alessandro Pellicori
—	FW	ITA	Denis Pironaci
—	FW	ITA	Tonino Sorrentino

Source: calcio-seriea.net

== Pre-season and friendlies ==
Win Draw Loss

== Competitions ==
=== Overall record ===
Competition	First match	Last match	Starting round	Final position	Record							
Competition	First match	Last match	Starting round	Final position	Pld	W	D	L	GF	GA	GD	Win %
Serie B	27 August 2005	May 2006	Matchday 1	22nd	42	7	7	28	26	63	−37	16.67
Coppa Italia	7 August 2005	14 August 2005	First round	Second round	2	1	1	0	3	0	+3	50.00
Total					44	8	8	28	29	63	−34	18.18

Last updated: May 2006
Source: Competitions

=== Serie B ===
==== League table ====
Pos	Team	Pld	W	D	L	GF	GA	GD	Pts	Promotion or relegation
18	AlbinoLeffe (O)	42	10	16	16	38	52	−14	46	Qualification to relegation play-offs
19	Avellino (R)	42	11	13	18	42	62	−20	46	Qualification to relegation play-offs
20	Ternana (R)	42	7	18	17	36	58	−22	39	Relegation to Serie C1
21	Cremonese (R)	42	6	12	24	36	60	−24	30	Relegation to Serie C1
22	Catanzaro (R, E, R)	42	7	7	28	26	63	−37	28	Relegation to Serie C2 (Note: Relegated and then restored directly in Serie C2 by the Lodo Petrucci for financial problems.)

Source: Almanacco Illustrato del Calcio 2007, Panini Edizioni, Modena, November 2006
Rules for classification: 1) points; 2) head-to-head points; 3) head-to-head goal difference; 4) head-to-head goals scored; 5) goal difference; 6) number of goals scored.
(E) Eliminated; (O) Play-off winners; (R) Relegated

==== Results summary ====
Overall								Home						Away					
Pld	W	D	L	GF	GA	GD	Pts	W	D	L	GF	GA	GD	W	D	L	GF	GA	GD
42	7	7	28	26	63	−37	28	5	5	11	17	27	−10	2	2	17	9	36	−27

Last updated: May 2006.
Source: calcio-seriea.net

==== Results by round ====
Round	1	2	3	4	5	6	7	8	9	10	11	12	13	14	15	16	17	18	19	20	21	22	23	24	25	26	27	28	29	30	31	32	33	34	35	36	37	38	39	40	41	42
Ground	H	A	H	A	A	H	A	H	A	H	A	H	A	H	H	A	H	A	H	A	H	A	H	A	H	H	A	H	A	H	A	H	A	H	A	A	H	A	H	A	H	A
Result	D	L	L	L	L	W	L	L	L	W	L	L	D	L	D	D	D	L	L	L	L	L	D	L	W	D	W	W	L	W	L	L	L	L	L	L	L	L	L	L	L	L
Position																																										

Updated to match(es) played on May 2006. Source: Serie B
A = Away; H = Home; W = Win; D = Draw; L = Loss

==== Matches ====
27 August 2005 1	Catanzaro	1–1	Vicenza	Catanzaro
--:-- CEST (UTC+2)	Corona 56'	Report	31' Schwoch	Stadium: Stadio Nicola Ceravolo; Referee: Mario Mazzoleni

4 September 2005 2	Cremonese	2–0	Catanzaro	Cremona
--:-- CEST (UTC+2)	Prisciandaro 48'; Carparelli 90+1'	Report		Stadium: Stadio Giovanni Zini; Referee: Maurizio Ciampi

10 September 2005 4	Rimini	4–2	Catanzaro	Rimini
--:-- CEST (UTC+2)	Moscardelli 53'; Ricchiuti 58'; Motta 84', 90+5'	Report	36', 40' Corona	Stadium: Stadio Romeo Neri; Referee: Nicola Rizzoli

16 September 2005 5	Verona	1–0	Catanzaro	Verona
--:-- CEST (UTC+2)	Adailton 65'	Report		Stadium: Stadio Marcantonio Bentegodi; Referee: Luca Marelli

20 September 2005 6	Catanzaro	1–0	Pescara	Catanzaro
--:-- CEST (UTC+2)	Pesaresi 73' (o.g.)	Report		Stadium: Stadio Nicola Ceravolo; Referee: Diego Preschern

24 September 2005 7	Triestina	2–0	Catanzaro	Trieste
--:-- CEST (UTC+2)	Baù 75'; Godeas 90+3'	Report		Stadium: Stadio Nereo Rocco; Referee: Mauro Bergonzi

1 October 2005 8	Catanzaro	0–1	Torino	Catanzaro
--:-- CEST (UTC+2)		Report	90+4' Muzzi	Stadium: Stadio Nicola Ceravolo; Referee: Gianluca Rocchi

5 October 2005 3	Catanzaro	1–2	Avellino	Catanzaro
--:-- CEST (UTC+2)	Corona 89'	Report	17', 22' Danilevicius	Stadium: Stadio Nicola Ceravolo; Referee: Paolo Mazzoleni

9 October 2005 9	Modena	1–0	Catanzaro	Modena
--:-- CEST (UTC+2)	Bucchi 40'	Report		Stadium: Stadio Alberto Braglia; Referee: Luca Banti

17 October 2005 10	Catanzaro	1–0	Crotone	Catanzaro
--:-- CEST (UTC+2)	Corona 45+2'	Report		Stadium: Stadio Nicola Ceravolo; Referee: Massimo De Santis

22 October 2005 11	Arezzo	1–0	Catanzaro	Arezzo
--:-- CEST (UTC+2)	Confalone 90+1'	Report		Stadium: Stadio Comunale; Referee: Giorgio Lops

25 October 2005 12	Catanzaro	1–2	Brescia	Catanzaro
--:-- CEST (UTC+2)	Corona 17'	Report	8' Stankevicius; 52' (pen.) Milanetto	Stadium: Stadio Nicola Ceravolo; Referee: Tiziano Pieri

29 October 2005 13	AlbinoLeffe	0–0	Catanzaro	Bergamo
--:-- CEST (UTC+2)		Report		Stadium: Stadio Atleti Azzurri d'Italia; Referee: Diego Preschern

5 November 2005 14	Catanzaro	0–1	Ternana	Catanzaro
--:-- CET (UTC+1)		Report	68' Di Deo	Stadium: Stadio Nicola Ceravolo; Referee: Antonio Giannoccaro

13 November 2005 15	Catanzaro	0–0	Bari	Catanzaro
--:-- CET (UTC+1)		Report		Stadium: Stadio Nicola Ceravolo; Referee: Oscar Girardi

19 November 2005 16	Mantova	0–0	Catanzaro	Mantua
--:-- CET (UTC+1)		Report		Stadium: Stadio Danilo Martelli; Referee: Stefano Cassarà

26 November 2005 17	Catanzaro	1–1	Piacenza	Catanzaro
--:-- CET (UTC+1)	Miceli 43'	Report	57' Stamilla	Stadium: Stadio Nicola Ceravolo; Referee: Maurizio Ciampi

5 December 2005 18	Atalanta	3–1	Catanzaro	Bergamo
--:-- CET (UTC+1)	Marcolini 43'; Rivalta 73'; Ventola 86'	Report	28' Corona	Stadium: Stadio Atleti Azzurri d'Italia; Referee: Gianluca Rocchi

10 December 2005 19	Catanzaro	2–4	Cesena	Catanzaro
--:-- CET (UTC+1)	Russo 46'; Corona 68' (pen.)	Report	11' Ficagna; 28' Mengoni; 53', 83' Ferreira Pinto	Stadium: Stadio Nicola Ceravolo; Referee: Paolo Tagliavento

17 December 2005 20	Catania	3–0	Catanzaro	Catania
--:-- CET (UTC+1)	Spinesi 8', 21' (pen.); Mascara 80'	Report		Stadium: Stadio Angelo Massimino; Referee: Gabriele Gava

20 December 2005 21	Catanzaro	0–2	Bologna	Catanzaro
--:-- CET (UTC+1)		Report	57' Smit; 90+2' (pen.) Loviso	Referee: Mauro Bergonzi

7 January 2006 22	Vicenza	1–0	Catanzaro	Vicenza
--:-- CET (UTC+1)	Vitiello 90+5'	Report		Stadium: Stadio Romeo Menti; Referee: Luca Marelli

13 January 2006 23	Catanzaro	1–1	Cremonese	Catanzaro
--:-- CEST (UTC+2)	Corona 52' (pen.)	Report	9' Carparelli	Stadium: Stadio Nicola Ceravolo; Referee: Mario Mazzoleni

17 January 2006 24	Avellino	2–0	Catanzaro	Avellino
--:-- CEST (UTC+2)	Biancolino 45+1' (pen.); Danilevicius 50'	Report		Stadium: Stadio Partenio; Referee: Nicola Ayroldi

21 January 2006 25	Catanzaro	1–0	Rimini	Catanzaro
--:-- CEST (UTC+2)	Greco 30'	Report		Stadium: Stadio Nicola Ceravolo; Referee: Roland Herberg

4 February 2006 27	Pescara	0–1	Catanzaro	Pescara
--:-- CEST (UTC+2)		Report	31' Gissi	Stadium: Stadio Adriatico; Referee: Giorgio Lops

8 February 2006 28	Catanzaro	2–1	Triestina	Catanzaro
--:-- CEST (UTC+2)	Corona 59' (pen.), 75'	Report	22' Borgobello	Stadium: Stadio Nicola Ceravolo; Referee: Christian Brighi

11 February 2006 29	Torino	2–0	Catanzaro	Turin
--:-- CEST (UTC+2)	Brevi 76'; Abbruscato 86'	Report		Stadium: Stadio Delle Alpi; Referee: Stefano Cassarà

18 February 2006 26	Catanzaro	0–0	Hellas Verona	Catanzaro
--:-- CEST (UTC+2)		Report		Stadium: Stadio Nicola Ceravolo; Referee: Paolo Mazzoleni
Note: The match was initially played on 28 January 2006 but was suspended due to fog in the fourth minute with the score 0–0. The match continued from the fourth minute on 18 February 2006.

25 February 2006 30	Catanzaro	1–0	Modena	Catanzaro
--:-- CEST (UTC+2)	Corona 56' (pen.)	Report		Stadium: Stadio Nicola Ceravolo; Referee: Oscar Girardi

4 March 2006 31	Crotone	2–1	Catanzaro	Crotone
--:-- CEST (UTC+2)	Sedivec 23'; Pellè 74'	Report	10' Corona	Stadium: Stadio Ezio Scida; Referee: Gianluca Rocchi

11 March 2006 32	Catanzaro	1–2	Arezzo	Catanzaro
--:-- CEST (UTC+2)	De Simone 23'	Report	45+1', 72' Floro Flores	Stadium: Stadio Nicola Ceravolo; Referee: Mario Mazzoleni

18 March 2006 33	Brescia	2–0	Catanzaro	Catanzaro
--:-- CEST (UTC+2)	Bruno 56'	Report	90+2' Mourad	Stadium: Stadio Mario Rigamonti; Referee: Oscar Girardi

25 March 2006 34	Catanzaro	1–3	AlbinoLeffe	Catanzaro
--:-- CEST (UTC+2)	Corona 31'	Report	45' Salgado; 55' Belingheri; 63' Iacopino	Stadium: Stadio Nicola Ceravolo; Referee: Stefano Cassarà

1 April 2006 35	Ternana	0–2	Catanzaro	Ternana
--:-- CEST (UTC+2)		Report	37' Mattioli; 81' De Sousa	Stadium: Stadio Libero Liberati; Referee: Maurizio Ciampi

8 April 2006 36	Bari	1–0	Catanzaro	Bari
--:-- CEST (UTC+2)	De Angelis 61' (o.g.)	Report		Stadium: Stadio San Nicola; Referee: Marco Gabriele

23 April 2006 37	Catanzaro	0–1	Mantova	Catanzaro
--:-- CEST (UTC+2)		Report	5' Noselli	Stadium: Stadio Nicola Ceravolo; Referee: Andrea De Marco

29 April 2006 38	Piacenza	2–1	Catanzaro	Piacenza
--:-- CEST (UTC+2)	Cacia 87'; Miglionico 90+2'	Report	76' Vanin	Stadium: Stadio Leonardo Garilli; Referee: Nicola Stefanini

6 May 2006 39	Catanzaro	1–2	Atalanta	Catanzaro
--:-- CEST (UTC+2)	Tedoldi 51'	Report	21', 52' Zampagna	Stadium: Stadio Nicola Ceravolo; Referee: Nicola Ayrnoldi

13 May 2006 40	Cesena	4–1	Catanzaro	Cesena
--:-- CET (UTC+1)	Morabito 7'; Ferreira Pinto 9'; Bernacci 20'; Salvetti 37'	Report	83' De Sousa	Stadium: Stadio Dino Manuzzi; Referee: Andrea Romeo

21 May 2006 41	Catanzaro	1–3	Catania	Lecce
--:-- CEST (UTC+2)	Mattioli 50'	Report	17', 72' Mascara; 31' Caserta	Stadium: Stadio Via del Mare; Referee: Oscar Girardi

28 May 2006 42	Bologna	3–0	Catanzaro	Bologna
--:-- CET (UTC+1)	Bellucci 19'; Mingazzini 42'; Marazzina 61'	Report		Stadium: Stadio Renato Dall'Ara; Referee: Oberdan Pantana

=== Coppa Italia ===
7 August 2005 1	Genoa	0–3	Catanzaro	Genoa
18:00 CET (UTC+1)				Stadium: Stadio Luigi Ferraris

14 August 2005 2	Catanzaro	0–0 (a.e.t.) (2–4 p)	Livorno	Catanzaro
17:30 CET (UTC+1)				Stadium: Stadio Nicola Ceravolo; Attendance: 7,633; Referee: Marco Gabriele
	Penalties
	Corona (penalty scored); Morello (penalty missed); Calzi (penalty scored); Sorrentino (penalty missed)		(penalty scored) Vargas; (penalty scored) Ruotolo; (penalty missed) Paulinho; (penalty scored) Palladino; (penalty scored) Lucarelli
