= Lithuania national football team results (1990–2019) =

Lithuania national football team

- Win Draw Loss Cancelled

The Lithuania national football team represents Lithuania in association football and is controlled by the Lithuanian Football Federation (LFF), the governing body of the sport in the country.

The team's largest victory came on 20 May 1995 when they defeated Estonia 7–0. Their worst loss is 10–0 against Egypt in 1924.

== Matches ==
=== 1990 ===
| 27 May 1990 Exhibition game | Georgia | 2–2 | Lithuania | Tbilisi, Georgia |

=== 1991 ===
| 15 November 1991 1991 Baltic Cup | Lithuania | 4–1 | Estonia | Klaipėda, Lithuania |

| 17 November 1991 1991 Baltic Cup | Lithuania | 1–1 | Latvia | Klaipėda, Lithuania |

=== 1992 ===
| 25 March 1992 Exhibition game | Poland | 2–0 | Lithuania | Rydułtowy, Poland |

| 14 April 1992 Exhibition game | Austria | 4–0 | Lithuania | Vienna, Austria |

| 28 April 1992 1994 WCQ | Northern Ireland | 2–2 | Lithuania | Belfast, Northern Ireland |

| 20 May 1992 Exhibition game | Moldova | 1–1 | Lithuania | Chișinău, Moldova |

| 3 June 1992 1994 WCQ | Albania | 1–0 | Lithuania | Tirana, Albania |

| 11 July 1992 1992 Baltic Cup | Estonia | 1–1 | Lithuania | Liepāja, Latvia |

| 12 July 1992 1992 Baltic Cup | Latvia | 2–3 | Lithuania | Liepāja, Latvia |

| 20 July 1992 Exhibition game | Lithuania | 1–1 | Belarus | Vilnius, Lithuania |

| 12 August 1992 1994 WCQ | Latvia | 1–2 | Lithuania | Riga, Latvia |

| 2 September 1992 Exhibition game | Lithuania | 1–0 | Georgia | Kaunas, Lithuania |

| 23 September 1992 1994 WCQ | Lithuania | 0–0 | Denmark | Vilnius, Lithuania |

| 14 October 1992 Exhibition game | Lithuania | 0–1 | Slovakia | Vilnius, Lithuania |

| 28 October 1992 1994 WCQ | Lithuania | 1–1 | Latvia | Vilnius, Lithuania |

=== 1993 ===
| 24 February 1993 1994 WCQ | Spain | 5–0 | Lithuania | Seville, Spain |

| 30 March 1993 Exhibition game | Slovakia | 2–2 | Lithuania | Dunajská Streda, Slovakia |

| 31 March 1993 Exhibition game | Poland | 1–1 | Lithuania | Brzeszcze, Poland |

| 14 April 1993 1994 WCQ | Lithuania | 3–1 | Albania | Vilnius, Lithuania |

| 18 May 1993 Exhibition game | Lithuania | 1–2 | Ukraine | Vilnius, Lithuania |

| 25 May 1993 1994 WCQ | Lithuania | 0–1 | Northern Ireland | Vilnius, Lithuania |

| 2 June 1993 1994 WCQ | Lithuania | 0–2 | Spain | Vilnius, Lithuania |

| 16 June 1993 1994 WCQ | Lithuania | 0–1 | Republic of Ireland | Vilnius, Lithuania |

| 3 July 1993 1993 Baltic Cup | Latvia | 0–0 | Lithuania | Pärnu, Estonia |

| 4 July 1993 1993 Baltic Cup | Estonia | 2–1 | Lithuania | Pärnu, Estonia |

| 25 August 1993 1994 WCQ | Denmark | 4–0 | Lithuania | Copenhagen, Denmark |

| 8 September 1993 1994 WCQ | Republic of Ireland | 2–0 | Lithuania | Dublin, Republic of Ireland |

=== 1994 ===
| 20 April 1994 Exhibition game | Lithuania | 1–1 | Israel | Vilnius, Lithuania |

| 25 May 1994 Exhibition game | Czech Republic | 5–3 | Lithuania | Ostrava, Czechia |

| 29 July 1994 1994 Baltic Cup | Lithuania | 3–0 | Estonia | Vilnius, Lithuania |

| 30 July 1994 1994 Baltic Cup | Lithuania | 1–0 | Latvia | Vilnius, Lithuania |

| 17 August 1994 Exhibition game | Sweden | 4–2 | Lithuania | Örebro, Sweden |

| 7 September 1994 1996 UECQ | Ukraine | 0–2 | Lithuania | Kyiv, Ukraine |

| 9 October 1994 1996 UECQ | Croatia | 2–0 | Lithuania | Zagreb, Croatia |

| 16 November 1994 1996 UECQ | Slovenia | 1–2 | Lithuania | Maribor, Slovenia |

=== 1995 ===
| 15 March 1995 Exhibition game | Poland | 4–1 | Lithuania | Ostrowiec Świętokrzyski, Poland |

| 29 March 1995 1996 UECQ | Lithuania | 0–0 | Croatia | Vilnius, Lithuania |

| 26 April 1995 1996 UECQ | Lithuania | 0–1 | Italy | Vilnius, Lithuania |

| 17 May 1995 Exhibition game | Lithuania | 2–1 | Greece | Vilnius, Lithuania |

| 20 May 1995 1995 Baltic Cup | Estonia | 0–7 | Lithuania | Riga, Latvia |

| 21 May 1995 1995 Baltic Cup | Latvia | 2–0 | Lithuania | Riga, Latvia |

| 7 June 1995 1996 UECQ | Lithuania | 2–1 | Slovenia | Vilnius, Lithuania |

| 29 July 1995 Exhibition game | Lithuania | 1–1 | Belarus | Vilnius, Lithuania |

| 16 August 1995 1996 UECQ | Estonia | 0–1 | Lithuania | Tallinn, Estonia |

| 6 September 1995 1996 UECQ | Lithuania | 1–3 | Ukraine | Vilnius, Lithuania |

| 11 October 1995 1996 UECQ | Lithuania | 5–0 | Estonia | Vilnius, Lithuania |

| 15 November 1995 1996 UECQ | Italy | 4–0 | Lithuania | Reggio Emilia, Italy |

=== 1996 ===
| 21 February 1996 Exhibition game | Israel | 4–2 | Lithuania | Haifa, Israel |

| 8 July 1996 1996 Baltic Cup | Latvia | 1–2 | Lithuania | Narva, Estonia |

| 9 July 1996 1996 Baltic Cup | Estonia | 1–1 | Lithuania | Narva, Estonia |

| 31 July 1996 Exhibition game | Belarus | 2–2 | Lithuania | Minsk, Belarus |

| 13 August 1996 Exhibition game | Ukraine | 5–2 | Lithuania | Kyiv, Ukraine |

| 31 August 1996 1998 WCQ | Romania | 3–0 | Lithuania | Bucharest, Romania |

| 5 October 1996 1998 WCQ | Lithuania | 2–0 | Iceland | Vilnius, Lithuania |

| 9 October 1996 1998 WCQ | Lithuania | 2–1 | Liechtenstein | Vilnius, Lithuania |

| 16 October 1996 Exhibition game | Brazil | 3–1 | Lithuania | Teresina, Brazil |

| 3 November 1996 Exhibition game | Lithuania | 4–0 | Indonesia | Vilnius, Lithuania |

=== 1997 ===
| 14 February 1997 1997 Cyprus International Tournament | Lithuania | 0–0 | Poland | Ayia Napa, Cyprus |

| 15 February 1997 1997 Cyprus International Tournament | Latvia | 1–0 | Lithuania | Dherynia, Cyprus |

| 17 February 1997 1997 Cyprus International Tournament | Cyprus | 1–0 | Lithuania | Paralimni, Cyprus |

| 2 April 1997 1998 WCQ | Lithuania | 0–1 | Romania | Vilnius, Lithuania |

| 30 April 1997 1998 WCQ | Liechtenstein | 0–2 | Lithuania | Eschen, Liechtenstein |

| 11 June 1997 1998 WCQ | Iceland | 0–0 | Lithuania | Reykjavík, Iceland |

| 9 July 1997 1997 Baltic Cup | Lithuania | 2–1 | Estonia | Vilnius, Lithuania |

| 11 July 1997 1997 Baltic Cup | Lithuania | 1–0 | Latvia | Vilnius, Lithuania |

| 6 August 1997 Exhibition game | Sweden | 1–0 | Lithuania | Malmö, Sweden |

| 20 August 1997 1998 WCQ | Republic of Ireland | 0–0 | Lithuania | Dublin, Republic of Ireland |

| 6 September 1997 1998 WCQ | Lithuania | 2–0 | Macedonia | Vilnius, Lithuania |

| 10 September 1997 1998 WCQ | Lithuania | 1–2 | Republic of Ireland | Vilnius, Lithuania |

| 24 September 1997 Exhibition game | Poland | 2–0 | Lithuania | Olsztyn, Poland |

| 11 October 1997 1998 WCQ | Macedonia | 1–2 | Lithuania | Skopje, Macedonia |

=== 1998 ===
| 21 April 1998 1998 Baltic Cup | Latvia | 1–2 | Lithuania | Liepāja, Latvia |

| 29 April 1998 Exhibition game | Chile | 1–0 | Lithuania | Ñuñoa, Chile |

| 27 May 1998 Exhibition game | Hungary | 1–0 | Lithuania | Nyiregyhaza, Hungary |

| 7 June 1998 Exhibition game | Belarus | 5–0 | Lithuania | Minsk, Belarus |

| 26 June 1998 Exhibition game | Lithuania | 1–2 | Azerbaijan | Viljandi, Estonia |

| 28 June 1998 1998 Baltic Cup | Estonia | 0–0 | Lithuania | Viljandi, Estonia |

| 29 June 1998 Exhibition game | Andorra | 0–4 | Lithuania | Karksi-Nuia, Estonia |

| 16 August 1998 Exhibition game | Lithuania | 1–1 | Moldova | Kaunas, Lithuania |

| 19 August 1998 Exhibition game | Lithuania | 0–3 | Belarus | Vilnius, Lithuania |

| 5 September 1998 2000 UECQ | Lithuania | 0–0 | Scotland | Vilnius, Lithuania |

| 10 October 1998 2000 UECQ | Lithuania | 0–0 | Faroe Islands | Vilnius, Lithuania |

| 14 October 1998 2000 UECQ | Lithuania | 4–2 | Bosnia and Herzegovina | Vilnius, Lithuania |

=== 1999 ===
| 27 March 1999 2000 UECQ | Czech Republic | 2–0 | Lithuania | Teplice, Czechia |

| 31 March 1999 2000 UECQ | Lithuania | 1–2 | Estonia | Vilnius, Lithuania |

| 5 June 1999 2000 UECQ | Bosnia and Herzegovina | 2–0 | Lithuania | Sarajevo, Bosnia and Herzegovina |

| 9 June 1999 2000 UECQ | Estonia | 1–2 | Lithuania | Tallinn, Estonia |

| 26 June 1999 Exhibition game | Argentina | 0–0 | Lithuania | Buenos Aires, Argentina |

| 18 August 1999 Exhibition game | Norway | 1–0 | Lithuania | Oslo, Norway |

| 4 September 1999 2000 UECQ | Lithuania | 0–4 | Czech Republic | Vilnius, Lithuania |

| 8 September 1999 2000 UECQ | Faroe Islands | 0–1 | Lithuania | Tórshavn, Faroe Islands |

| 9 October 1999 2000 UECQ | Scotland | 3–0 | Lithuania | Glasgow, Scotland |

=== 2000 ===
| 2 February 2000 2000 Cyprus International Tournament | Cyprus | 2–1 | Lithuania | Limassol, Cyprus |
| | Konstantinou 61', 88' (pen.) | Report | Fomenka 86' | Stadium: Tsirio Stadium; Attendance: 5,000 |

| 4 February 2000 2000 Cyprus International Tournament | Lithuania | 1–2 | Moldova | Larnaca, Cyprus |
| | Fomenka 85' | Report | Rogaciov 14', 81' | Stadium: Ammochostos Stadium; Attendance: 5,000 |

| 6 February 2000 2000 Cyprus International Tournament | Lithuania | 2–1 | Latvia | Larnaca, Cyprus |
| | Trakys 54'; Fomenka 89' | Report | Pelcis 4' | Stadium: Antonis Papadopoulos Stadium; Attendance: 1,200 |

| 26 April 2000 Exhibition game | Lithuania | 2–1 | Latvia | Kaunas, Lithuania |
| | Dančenka 64'; Maciulevičius 87' | Report | Peltsis 13' | Attendance: 2,000; Referee: Kazimir Znaydinski |

| 3 June 2000 Exhibition game | Lithuania | 1–2 | Armenia | Kaunas, Lithuania |
| | Jankauskas 23' | Report | Movsisyan 5'; Petrosyan 29' | Attendance: 2,000 |

| 16 August 2000 Exhibition game | Portugal | 5–1 | Lithuania | Viseu, Portugal |
| | Pinto 31'; Figo 38'; Costa 47' (pen.); Beto 80'; Pauleta 86' | Report | Fomenka 44' (pen.) | Attendance: 11,000; Referee: Graziano Cesare |

| 3 September 2000 2002 WCQ | Romania | 1–0 | Lithuania | Bucharest, Romania |

| 7 October 2000 2002 WCQ | Lithuania | 0–4 | Georgia | Kaunas, Lithuania |

| 11 October 2000 2002 WCQ | Lithuania | 1–6 | Hungary | Kaunas, Lithuania |

| 22 December 2000 Unofficial friendly | Catalonia | 5–0 | Lithuania | Barcelona |
| 21:15 | Óscar 10', 83'; Jordi 43'; Gerard 71' (pen.); Xavi 78' | Report | | Stadium: Camp Nou; Attendance: 47,000; Referee: Antoni Llonch (Spain) |

=== 2001 ===
| 26 February 2001 2001 Cyprus International Tournament | Cyprus | 1–2 | Lithuania | Limassol, Cyprus |
| | Yiasoumi 43' | Report | Danilevičius 83'; Poškus 87' | Attendance: 1,000 |

| 28 February 2001 2001 Cyprus International Tournament | Lithuania | 0–3 | Romania | Strovolos, Cyprus |
| | | Report | Ganea 12', 40'; Codrea 57' | Attendance: 1,500 |

| 24 March 2001 2002 WCQ | Hungary | 1–1 | Lithuania | Budapest, Hungary |

| 28 March 2001 2002 WCQ | Italy | 4–0 | Lithuania | Trieste, Italy |

| 6 June 2001 2002 WCQ | Lithuania | 1–2 | Romania | Kaunas, Lithuania |

| 4 July 2001 2001 Baltic Cup | Estonia | 2–5 | Lithuania | Riga, Latvia |

| 5 July 2001 2001 Baltic Cup | Latvia | 4–1 | Lithuania | Riga, Latvia |

| 15 August 2001 Exhibition game | Lithuania | 2–3 | Israel | Kaunas, Lithuania |

| 1 September 2001 2002 WCQ | Lithuania | 0–0 | Italy | Kaunas, Lithuania |

| 5 September 2001 2002 WCQ | Georgia | 2–0 | Lithuania | Tbilisi, Georgia |

=== 2002 ===
| 9 February 2002 2002 Malta International Football Tournament | Lithuania | 1–0 | Moldova | Attard, Malta |

| 11 February 2002 2002 Malta International Football Tournament | Malta | 1–1 | Lithuania | Attard, Malta |

| 13 February 2002 2002 Malta International Football Tournament | Lithuania | 0–3 | Jordan | Attard, Malta |

| 17 April 2002 Exhibition game | FR Yugoslavia | 4–1 | Lithuania | Smederevo, Yugoslavia |

| 21 August 2002 Exhibition game | Lithuania | 2–4 | Israel | Kaunas, Lithuania |

| 7 September 2002 2004 UECQ | Lithuania | 0–2 | Germany | Kaunas, Lithuania |

| 12 October 2002 2004 UECQ | Lithuania | 2–0 | Faroe Islands | Kaunas, Lithuania |

| 16 October 2002 2004 UECQ | Iceland | 3–0 | Lithuania | Reykjavík, Iceland |

=== 2003 ===
| 12 February 2003 Exhibition game | Latvia | 2–1 | Lithuania | Antalya, Turkey |

| 29 March 2003 2004 UECQ | Germany | 1–1 | Lithuania | Nuremberg, Germany |

| 2 April 2003 2004 UECQ | Lithuania | 1–0 | Scotland | Kaunas, Lithuania |

| 30 April 2003 Exhibition game | Lithuania | 0–1 | Romania | Kaunas, Lithuania |

| 11 June 2003 2004 UECQ | Lithuania | 0–3 | Iceland | Kaunas, Lithuania |

| 3 July 2003 2003 Baltic Cup | Estonia | 1–5 | Lithuania | Valga, Estonia |

| 4 July 2003 2003 Baltic Cup | Latvia | 2–1 | Lithuania | Valga, Estonia |

| 20 August 2003 Exhibition game | Bulgaria | 3–0 | Lithuania | Sofia, Bulgaria |

| 10 September 2003 2004 UECQ | Faroe Islands | 1–3 | Lithuania | Toftir, Faroe Islands |

| 11 October 2003 2004 UECQ | Scotland | 1–0 | Lithuania | Glasgow, Scotland |

| 14 December 2003 Exhibition game | Lithuania | 1–3 | Poland | Attard, Malta |

=== 2004 ===
| 30 March 2004 Exhibition game | Israel | 2–1 | Lithuania | Ramat Gan, Israel |

| 28 April 2004 Exhibition game | Belarus | 1–0 | Lithuania | Minsk, Belarus |

| 5 June 2004 Exhibition game | Portugal | 4–1 | Lithuania | Setúbal, Portugal |

| 18 August 2004 Exhibition game | Russia | 4–3 | Lithuania | Moscow, Russia |

| 4 September 2004 2006 WCQ | Belgium | 1–1 | Lithuania | Charleroi, Belgium |

| 8 September 2004 2006 WCQ | Lithuania | 4–0 | San Marino | Kaunas, Lithuania |

| 13 October 2004 2006 WCQ | Lithuania | 0–0 | Spain | Vilnius, Lithuania |

| 17 November 2004 2006 WCQ | San Marino | 0–1 | Lithuania | Serravalle, San Marino |

=== 2005 ===
| 9 February 2005 Exhibition game | Georgia | 1–0 | Lithuania | Tbilisi, Georgia |

| 30 March 2005 2006 WCQ | Bosnia and Herzegovina | 1–1 | Lithuania | Sarajevo, Bosnia and Herzegovina |

| 21 May 2005 2005 Baltic Cup | Lithuania | 2–0 | Latvia | Kaunas, Lithuania |

| 4 June 2005 2006 WCQ | Spain | 1–0 | Lithuania | Valencia, Spain |

| 17 August 2005 Exhibition game | Lithuania | 1–0 | Belarus | Vilnius, Lithuania |

| 3 September 2005 2006 WCQ | Serbia and Montenegro | 2–0 | Lithuania | Belgrade, Serbia and Montenegro |

| 7 September 2005 2006 WCQ | Lithuania | 0–1 | Bosnia and Herzegovina | Vilnius, Lithuania |

| 8 October 2005 2006 WCQ | Lithuania | 0–2 | Serbia and Montenegro | Vilnius, Lithuania |

| 12 October 2005 2006 WCQ | Lithuania | 1–1 | Belgium | Vilnius, Lithuania |

=== 2006 ===
| 1 March 2006 Exhibition game | Albania | 1–2 | Lithuania | Tirana, Albania |
| 18:00 UTC+1 | Aliaj 33' (pen.) | Report | Savėnas 34'; Danilevičius 41' | Stadium: Qemal Stafa Stadium; Attendance: 7,300; Referee: Tiziano Pieri (Italy) |

| 2 May 2006 Exhibition game | Poland | 0–1 | Lithuania | Bełchatów, Poland |
| 20:00 UTC+2 | | Report | Gedgaudas 14' | Stadium: GIEKSA Arena; Attendance: 5,500; Referee: Emil Božinovski (Macedonia) |

| 16 August 2006 Exhibition game | Moldova | 3–2 | Lithuania | Chișinău, Moldova |
| 19:00 UTC+3 | Dadu 15'; Epureanu 56' (pen.); Cleşcenco 87' (pen.) | Report | Poškus 14'; Danilevičius 38' | Stadium: Zimbru Stadium; Attendance: 7,000; Referee: Vitaliy Godulyan (Ukraine) |

| 2 September 2006 2008 UECQ | Italy | 1–1 | Lithuania | Naples, Italy |
| 20:50 UTC+2 | Inzaghi 30' | Report | Danilevičius 21' | Stadium: Stadio San Paolo; Attendance: 43,440; Referee: Martin Hansson (Sweden) |

| 6 September 2006 2008 UECQ | Lithuania | 1–2 | Scotland | Kaunas, Lithuania |
| 19:30 UTC+3 | Miceika 85' | Report | Dailly 46'; Miller 62' | Stadium: S.Darius and S.Girėnas Stadium; Attendance: 6,500; Referee: Vladimir Hrinak (Slovakia) |

| 7 October 2006 2008 UECQ | Faroe Islands | 0–1 | Lithuania | Tórshavn, Faroe Islands |
| 15:00 UTC+1 | | Report | Skerla 89' | Stadium: Tórsvøllur; Attendance: 1,982; Referee: Anthony Buttimer (Ireland) |

| 11 October 2006 Exhibition game | Kuwait | 1–0 | Lithuania | Kuwait City, Kuwait |
| 21:00 UTC+3 | Al Hamad 11' | Report | | Stadium: Al-Sadaqua Walsalam Stadium; Referee: Abdulrahman Abdou (Qatar) |

| 15 November 2006 Exhibition game | Malta | 1–4 | Lithuania | Paola, Malta |
| 14:00 UTC+1 | Agius 86' | Report | Danilevičius 37', 67'; Radzinevičius 58'; Kavaliauskas 90' | Stadium: Hibernians Stadium; Attendance: 1,500; Referee: Brian Lawlor (Wales) |

=== 2007 ===
| 6 February 2007 Exhibition game | Mali | 3–1 | Lithuania | La Courneuve, France |
| 19:00 UTC+1 | Keita 21'; Diarra 30'; Diallo 43' | Report | Jankauskas 28' | Stadium: Stade Marville; Attendance: 4,500; Referee: Hervé Piccirillo (France) |

| 24 March 2007 2008 UECQ | Lithuania | 0–1 | France | Kaunas, Lithuania |
| 19:00 UTC+2 | | Report | Anelka 73' | Stadium: S.Darius and S.Girėnas Stadium; Attendance: 8,740; Referee: Howard Webb (England) |

| 28 March 2007 2008 UECQ | Ukraine | 1–0 | Lithuania | Odesa, Ukraine |
| 18:00 UTC+3 | Husyev 47' | Report | | Stadium: Chornomorets Stadium; Attendance: 33,600; Referee: Florian Meyer (Germany) |

| 2 June 2007 2008 UECQ | Lithuania | 1–0 | Georgia | Kaunas, Lithuania |
| 21:00 UTC+3 | Mikoliūnas 78' | Report | | Stadium: S.Darius and S.Girėnas Stadium; Attendance: 6,400; Referee: Claudio Circhetta (Switzerland) |

| 6 June 2007 2008 UECQ | Lithuania | 0–2 | Italy | Kaunas, Lithuania |
| 21:45 UTC+3 | | Report | Quagliarella 31', 45' | Stadium: S.Darius and S.Girėnas Stadium; Attendance: 7,800; Referee: Pieter Vink (Netherlands) |

| 22 August 2007 Exhibition game | Lithuania | 2–1 | Turkmenistan | Kaunas, Lithuania |
| 20:00 UTC+3 | Danilevičius 42', 47' | Report | Nikitenko 90+3' | Stadium: S.Darius and S.Girėnas Stadium; Attendance: 1,000; Referee: Sergey Shmolik (Belarus) |

| 8 September 2007 2008 UECQ | Scotland | 3–1 | Lithuania | Glasgow, Scotland |
| 15:00 UTC+1 | Boyd 31'; McManus 77'; McFadden 83' | Report | Danilevičius 61' (pen.) | Stadium: Hampden Park; Attendance: 51,349; Referee: Damir Skomina (Slovenia) |

| 12 September 2007 2008 UECQ | Lithuania | 2–1 | Faroe Islands | Kaunas, Lithuania |
| 20:00 UTC+3 | Jankauskas 8'; Danilevičius 52' | Report | R. Jacobsen 90+3' | Stadium: S.Darius and S.Girėnas Stadium; Attendance: 5,500; Referee: Tsvetan Georgiev (Bulgaria) |

| 17 October 2007 2008 UECQ | France | 2–0 | Lithuania | Nantes, France |
| 21:00 UTC+2 | Henry 80', 81' | Report | | Stadium: Stade de la Beaujoire; Attendance: 36,650; Referee: Viktor Kassai (Hungary) |

| 17 November 2007 2008 UECQ | Lithuania | 2–0 | Ukraine | Kaunas, Lithuania |
| 20:00 UTC+2 | Savėnas 41'; Danilevičius 67' | Report | | Stadium: S.Darius and S.Girėnas Stadium; Attendance: 2,800; Referee: David Malcolm (Northern Ireland) |

| 21 November 2007 2008 UECQ | Georgia | 0–2 | Lithuania | Tbilisi, Georgia |
| 19:30 UTC+4 | | Report | Kšanavičius 52', 90+6' | Stadium: Boris Paichadze Stadium; Attendance: 21,300; Referee: Ljubomir Krstevski (Macedonia) |

=== 2008 ===
| 26 March 2008 Exhibition game | Lithuania | 1–0 | Azerbaijan | Vilnius, Lithuania |
| 19:00 UTC+2 | Klimavičius 38' | Report | | Stadium: Vėtra Stadium; Attendance: 1,000; Referee: Igor Satchi (Moldova) |

| 27 May 2008 Exhibition game | Czech Republic | 2–0 | Lithuania | Prague, Czech Republic |
| 20:30 UTC+2 | Koller 39', 64' | Report | | Stadium: Stadion Eden; Attendance: 14,220; Referee: Vladimír Hriňák (Slovakia) |

| 31 May 2008 2008 Baltic Cup | Estonia | 0–1 | Lithuania | Jūrmala, Latvia |
| 18:00 UTC+3 | | Report | Mižigurskis 89' | Stadium: Slokas Stadium; Attendance: 1,300; Referee: Romāns Lajuks (Latvia) |

| 1 June 2008 2008 Baltic Cup | Latvia | 2–1 | Lithuania | Riga, Latvia |
| 14:00 UTC+3 | Gorkšs 56'; Alunderis 77' (o.g.) | Report | Beniušis 81' | Stadium: Skonto stadions Attendance: 3,330; Referee: Sten Kaldma (Estonia) |

| 4 June 2008 Exhibition game | Lithuania | 1–4 | Russia | Burghausen, Germany |
| 19:00 UTC+2 | Savenas 24' | Report | Zyryanov 33'; Arshavin 52'; Pavlyuchenko 64'; Bystrov 80' | Stadium: Wacker-Arena; Attendance: 5,000; Referee: Peter Sippel (Germany) |

| 20 August 2008 Exhibition game | Lithuania | 3–0 | Moldova | Marijampolė, Lithuania |
| 19:00 UTC+3 | Poškus 23', 54'; Danilevičius 61' | Report | | Stadium: Sūduva Stadium; Attendance: 2,000; Referee: Hannes Kaasik (Estonia) |

| 6 September 2008 2010 WCQ | Romania | 0–3 | Lithuania | Cluj-Napoca, Romania |
| 21:00 UTC+3 | | Report | Stankevičius 31'; Mikoliūnas 69'; Kalonas 86' | Stadium: Dr. C. Rădulescu Stadium; Attendance: 14,000; Referee: Alan Kelly (Ireland) |

| 10 September 2008 2010 WCQ | Lithuania | 2–0 | Austria | Marijampolė, Lithuania |
| 20:30 UTC+3 | Danilevičius 52', 58' | Report | | Stadium: Sūduva Stadium; Attendance: 4,500; Referee: Paolo Tagliavento (Italy) |

| 11 October 2008 2010 WCQ | Serbia | 3–0 | Lithuania | Belgrade, Serbia |
| 20:15 UTC+2 | Ivanović 6'; Krasić 34'; Žigić 82' | Report | | Stadium: Stadion Crvena Zvezda; Attendance: 22,000; Referee: Manuel Mejuto González (Spain) |

| 15 October 2008 2010 WCQ | Lithuania | 1–0 | Faroe Islands | Kaunas, Lithuania |
| 19:00 UTC+3 | Danilevičius 20' | Report | | Stadium: S. Darius and S. Girėnas Stadium; Attendance: 5,000; Referee: Costas Kapitanis (Cyprus) |

| 19 November 2008 Exhibition game | Lithuania | 1–1 | Moldova | Tallinn, Estonia |
| 17:00 UTC+2 | Savėnas 72' (pen.) | Report | Bugaiov 69' | Stadium: A. Le Coq Arena; Attendance: 100; Referee: Kristo Tohver (Estonia) |

| 22 November 2008 Exhibition game | Estonia | 1–1 | Lithuania | Kuressaare, Estonia |
| 13:00 UTC+2 | Puri 6' | Report | Kavaliauskas 35' | Stadium: Kuressaare linnastaadion Attendance: 800; Referee: Tero Nieminen (Finland) |

=== 2009 ===
| 7 February 2009 Exhibition game | Lithuania | 1–1 | Poland | Loulé, Portugal |
| 20:20 UTC+0 | Klimavičius 26' | Report | Brożek 11' | Stadium: Estádio Algarve; Attendance: 100; Referee: Duarte Gomes (Portugal) |

| 11 February 2009 Exhibition game | Andorra | 1–3 | Lithuania | Albufeira, Portugal |
| 18:15 UTC+0 | Lima 78' (pen.) | Report | Velička 44'; Šernas 53'; Kavaliauskas 83' | Stadium: Estádio Municipal; Attendance: 100; Referee: Carlos Xistra (Portugal) |

| 28 March 2009 2010 WCQ | Lithuania | 0–1 | France | Kaunas, Lithuania |
| 21:45 UTC+2 | | Report | Ribéry 67' | Stadium: S. Darius and S. Girėnas Stadium; Attendance: 8,700; Referee: Eric Braamhaar (Netherlands) |

| 1 April 2009 2010 WCQ | France | 1–0 | Lithuania | Saint-Denis, France |
| 21:00 UTC+2 | Ribéry 75' | Report | | Stadium: Stade de France; Attendance: 79,543; Referee: Howard Webb (England) |

| 6 June 2009 2010 WCQ | Lithuania | 0–1 | Romania | Marijampolė, Lithuania |
| 21:00 UTC+3 | | Report | Marica 38' | Stadium: Sūduva Stadium; Attendance: 5,850; Referee: Jonas Eriksson (Sweden) |

| 12 August 2009 Exhibition game | Luxembourg | 0–1 | Lithuania | Luxembourg City, Luxembourg |
| 20:00 UTC+2 | | Report | Danilevičius 40' | Stadium: Josy Barthel Stadium; Attendance: 1,455; Referee: Alan Black (Northern Ireland) |

| 9 September 2009 2010 WCQ | Faroe Islands | 2–1 | Lithuania | Toftir, Faroe Islands |
| 17:15 UTC+1 | S. Olsen 13'; A. Hansen 34' | Report | Danilevičius 22' (pen.) | Stadium: Svangaskarð; Attendance: 1,942; Referee: István Vad (Hungary) |

| 10 October 2009 2010 WCQ | Austria | 2–1 | Lithuania | Innsbruck, Austria |
| 20:30 UTC+2 | Janko 16'; Wallner 80' (pen.) | Report | Stankevičius 66' | Stadium: Tivoli Neu; Attendance: 14,200; Referee: Serge Gumienny (Belgium) |

| 14 October 2009 2010 WCQ | Lithuania | 2–1 | Serbia | Marijampolė, Lithuania |
| 21:00 UTC+3 | Kalonas 20' (pen.); Stankevičius 68' (pen.) | Report | Tošić 60' | Stadium: Sūduva Stadium; Attendance: 2,000; Referee: Anton Guenov (Bulgaria) |

=== 2010 ===
| 25 May 2010 Exhibition game | Ukraine | 4–0 | Lithuania | Kharkiv, Ukraine |
| 19:00 UTC+3 | Aliyev 10', 16'; Shevchenko 69' (pen.), 79' | Report | | Stadium: Metalist Oblast Sports Complex; Attendance: 31,000; Referee: Stanislav Sukhina (Russia) |

| 18 June 2010 2010 Baltic Cup | Lithuania | 0–0 | Latvia | Kaunas, Lithuania |
| 18:00 UTC+3 | | Report | | Stadium: S. Darius and S. Girėnas Stadium; Attendance: 1,000; Referee: Hannes Kaasik (Estonia) |

| 20 June 2010 2010 Baltic Cup | Lithuania | 2–0 | Estonia | Kaunas, Lithuania |
| 18:00 UTC+3 | Savėnas 31'; Rimkevičius 90+2' | Report | | Stadium: S. Darius and S. Girėnas Stadium; Attendance: 600; Referee: Andrejs Sipailo (Latvia) |

| 11 August 2010 Exhibition game | Lithuania | 0–2 | Belarus | Kaunas, Lithuania |
| 18:00 UTC+3 | | Report | V. Hleb 48', 90+2' | Stadium: S. Darius and S. Girėnas Stadium; Attendance: 1,700; Referee: Igor Satchi (Moldova) |

| 3 September 2010 2012 UECQ | Lithuania | 0–0 | Scotland | Kaunas, Lithuania |
| 21:15 UTC+3 | | Report | | Stadium: S. Darius and S. Girėnas Stadium; Attendance: 5,248; Referee: Cüneyt Çakır (Turkey) |

| 7 September 2010 2012 UECQ | Czech Republic | 0–1 | Lithuania | Olomouc, Czech Republic |
| 20:15 UTC+2 | | Report | Šernas 25' | Stadium: Andrův stadion Attendance: 12,038; Referee: Alon Yefet (Israel) |

| 8 October 2010 2012 UECQ | Spain | 3–1 | Lithuania | Salamanca, Spain |
| 22:00 UTC+2 | Llorente 47', 56'; Silva 79' | Report | Šernas 54' | Stadium: Estadio El Helmántico; Attendance: 16,800; Referee: Gianluca Rocchi (Italy) |

| 17 November 2010 Exhibition game | Hungary | 2–0 | Lithuania | Székesfehérvár, Hungary |
| 18:00 UTC+1 | Priskin 61'; Dzsudzsák 80' | Report | | Stadium: Sóstói Stadion; Attendance: 3,000; Referee: Bas Nijhuis (Netherlands) |

=== 2011 ===
| 25 March 2011 Exhibition game | Lithuania | 2–0 | Poland | Kaunas, Lithuania |
| 21:30 UTC+2 | Mikoliūnas 18'; Česnauskis 29' | Report | | Stadium: S. Darius and S. Girėnas Stadium; Attendance: 4,500; Referee: Andris Treimanis (Latvia) |

| 29 March 2011 2012 UECQ | Lithuania | 1–3 | Spain | Kaunas, Lithuania |
| 20:45 UTC+3 | Stankevičius 57' | Report | Xavi 19'; Kijanskas 70' (o.g.); Mata 83' | Stadium: S. Darius and S. Girėnas Stadium; Attendance: 9,180; Referee: Laurent Duhamel (France) |

| 3 June 2011 2012 UECQ | Liechtenstein | 2–0 | Lithuania | Vaduz, Liechtenstein |
| 19:30 UTC+2 | Erne 7'; Polverino 36' | Report | | Stadium: Rheinpark Stadion; Attendance: 1,886; Referee: Artyom Kuchin (Kazakhstan) |

| 7 June 2011 Exhibition game | Norway | 1–0 | Lithuania | Oslo, Norway |
| 19:00 UTC+2 | Pedersen 84' | Report | | Stadium: Ullevaal Stadion; Attendance: 12,945; Referee: Stuart Attwell (England) |

| 10 August 2011 Exhibition game | Lithuania | 3–0 | Armenia | Kaunas, Lithuania |
| 19:00 UTC+3 | Klimavičius 9'; Česnauskis 75'; Beniušis 78' | Report | | Stadium: S. Darius and S. Girėnas Stadium; Attendance: 500; Referee: Andrejs Sipailo (Latvia) |

| 2 September 2011 2012 UECQ | Lithuania | 0–0 | Liechtenstein | Kaunas, Lithuania |
| 18:00 UTC+3 | | Report | | Stadium: S. Darius and S. Girėnas Stadium; Attendance: 3,500; Referee: Ken Henry Johnsen (Norway) |

| 6 September 2011 2012 UECQ | Scotland | 1–0 | Lithuania | Glasgow, Scotland |
| 20:00 UTC+1 | Naismith 50' | Report | | Stadium: Hampden Park; Attendance: 34,071; Referee: Kristinn Jakobsson (Iceland) |

| 11 October 2011 2012 UECQ | Lithuania | 1–4 | Czech Republic | Kaunas, Lithuania |
| 21:45 UTC+3 | Šernas 68' (pen.) | Report | M. Kadlec 2' (pen.), 85' (pen.); Rezek 16', 45' | Stadium: S. Darius and S. Girėnas Stadium; Attendance: 4,000; Referee: David Fernández Borbalán (Spain) |

=== 2012 ===
| 29 May 2012 Exhibition game | Lithuania | 0–0 | Russia | Nyon, Switzerland |
| 19:45 UTC+2 | | Report | | Stadium: Colovray Sports Centre; Attendance: 500; Referee: Mauro Bergonzi (Italy) |

| 1 June 2012 2012 Baltic Cup | Latvia | 5–0 | Lithuania | Võru, Estonia |
| 17:30 UTC+3 | Cauņa 13' (pen.); Gauračs 17', 48'; Višņakovs 36'; Smirnovs 81' | Report | | Stadium: Võru Stadium; Attendance: 125; Referee: Mattias Gestranius (Finland) |

| 3 June 2012 2012 Baltic Cup | Estonia | 1–0 | Lithuania | Tartu, Estonia |
| 16:30 UTC+3 | Voskoboinikov 18' | Report | | Stadium: Tamme Stadium; Attendance: 1,096; Referee: Hannes Kaasik (Estonia) |

| 7 June 2012 Exhibition game | Belarus | 1–1 | Lithuania | Minsk, Belarus |
| 19:00 UTC+3 | Drahun 79' | Report | Radavičius 43' | Stadium: Dinamo Stadium; Attendance: 2,000; Referee: Igor Satschi (Moldova) |

| 15 August 2012 Exhibition game | Macedonia | 1–0 | Lithuania | Skopje, Macedonia |
| 20:45 UTC+2 | Pandev 54' | Report | | Stadium: Philip II Arena; Attendance: 7,000; Referee: Halis Özkahya (Turkey) |

| 7 September 2012 2014 WCQ | Lithuania | 1–1 | Slovakia | Vilnius, Lithuania |
| 21:15 UTC+3 | Žaliūkas 18' | Report | Sapara 41' | Stadium: LFF Stadium; Attendance: 4,000; Referee: Carlos Clos Gómez (Spain) |

| 11 September 2012 2014 WCQ | Greece | 2–0 | Lithuania | Piraeus, Greece |
| 21:45 UTC+3 | Ninis 55'; Mitroglou 72' | Report | | Stadium: Karaiskakis Stadium; Attendance: 21,466; Referee: Mark Courtney (Northern Ireland) |

| 12 October 2012 2014 WCQ | Liechtenstein | 0–2 | Lithuania | Vaduz, Liechtenstein |
| 19:30 UTC+2 | | Report | Česnauskis 50', 74' | Stadium: Rheinpark Stadion; Attendance: 1,112; Referee: Slavko Vinčić (Slovenia) |

| 16 October 2012 2014 WCQ | Bosnia and Herzegovina | 3–0 | Lithuania | Zenica, Bosnia and Herzegovina |
| 20:00 UTC+2 | Ibišević 29'; Džeko 35'; Pjanić 41' | Report | | Stadium: Stadion Bilino polje Attendance: 11,920; Referee: Miroslav Zelinka (Czech Republic) |

| 14 November 2012 Exhibition game | Armenia | 4–2 | Lithuania | Yerevan, Armenia |
| 19:00 UTC+5 | Manucharyan 7'; Mkrtchyan 50'; Mkhitaryan 55'; Özbiliz 72' | Report | Rimkevičius 7', 82' (pen.) | Stadium: Vazgen Sargsyan Republican Stadium; Attendance: 10,500; Referee: Lasha Silagava (Georgia) |

=== 2013 ===
| 22 March 2013 2014 WCQ | Slovakia | 1–1 | Lithuania | Žilina, Slovakia |
| 20:10 UTC+1 | Jakubko 40' | Report | Šernas 19' | Stadium: Štadión pod Dubňom; Attendance: 4,560; Referee: Michael Oliver (England) |

| 26 March 2013 Exhibition game | Albania | 4–1 | Lithuania | Tirana, Albania |
| 21:00 UTC+1 | Meha 33'; Çani 38'; Basha 43'; Palionis 59' (o.g.) | Report | Razulis 75' | Stadium: Qemal Stafa Stadium; Attendance: 500; Referee: Ivailo Stoyanov (Bulgaria) |

| 7 June 2013 2014 WCQ | Lithuania | 0–1 | Greece | Vilnius, Lithuania |
| 21:45 UTC+3 | | Report | Christodoulopoulos 20' | Stadium: LFF Stadium; Attendance: 4,500; Referee: Olegário Benquerença (Portugal) |

| 14 August 2013 Exhibition game | Luxembourg | 2–1 | Lithuania | Luxembourg City, Luxembourg |
| 19:30 UTC+2 | Joachim 49'; Bensi 80' | Report | Matulevičius 15' | Stadium: Stade Josy Barthel; Attendance: 958; Referee: Arnold Hunter (Northern Ireland) |

| 6 September 2013 2014 WCQ | Latvia | 2–1 | Lithuania | Riga, Latvia |
| 21:10 UTC+3 | Bulvītis 20'; Zjuzins 42' | Report | Matulevičius 44' | Stadium: Skonto Stadium; Attendance: 7,306; Referee: Sébastien Delferiere (Belgium) |

| 10 September 2013 2014 WCQ | Lithuania | 2–0 | Liechtenstein | Marijampolė, Lithuania |
| 18:30 UTC+3 | Matulevičius 18'; Kijanskas 40' | Report | | Stadium: ARVI Football Arena; Attendance: 1,955; Referee: Lasha Silagava (Georgia) |

| 11 October 2013 2014 WCQ | Lithuania | 2–0 | Latvia | Vilnius, Lithuania |
| 18:30 UTC+3 | Cernych 7'; Mikoliūnas 68' | Report | | Stadium: LFF Stadium; Attendance: 2,900; Referee: Petur Reinert (Faroe Islands) |

| 15 October 2013 2014 WCQ | Lithuania | 0–1 | Bosnia and Herzegovina | Kaunas, Lithuania |
| 20:00 UTC+3 | | Report | Ibišević 68' | Stadium: Darius and Girėnas Stadium; Attendance: 6,239; Referee: Felix Zwayer (Germany) |

| 18 November 2013 Exhibition game | Moldova | 1–1 | Lithuania | Chișinău, Moldova |
| 19:00 UTC+2 | Ioniță 72' | Report | Kalonas 39' | Stadium: Zimbru Stadium; Attendance: 4,794; Referee: Alexandru Tudor (Romania) |

=== 2014 ===
| 5 March 2014 Exhibition game | Kazakhstan | 1–1 | Lithuania | Aksu, Turkey |
| 17:00 UTC+2 | Zhumaskaliyev 68' | Report | Vičius 4' | Stadium: Mardan Sports Complex; Attendance: 200; Referee: Mikhail Vilkov (Russia) |

| 29 May 2014 2014 Baltic Cup | Lithuania | 1–0 | Finland | Ventspils, Latvia |
| 17:00 UTC+3 | Novikovas 42' | Report | | Stadium: Olimpiskais Stadions; Attendance: 631; Referee: Vadims Direktorenko (Latvia) |

| 31 May 2014 2014 Baltic Cup | Latvia | 1–0 | Lithuania | Liepāja, Latvia |
| 20:00 UTC+3 | Bulvītis 6' | Report | | Stadium: Daugava Stadium; Attendance: 2,300; Referee: Kristo Tohver (Estonia) |

| 6 June 2014 Exhibition game | Poland | 2–1 | Lithuania | Gdańsk, Poland |
| 17:30 UTC+2 | Milik 59'; Lewandowski 79' (pen.) | Report | Spalvis 44' | Stadium: Stadion Energa Gdańsk; Attendance: 33,074; Referee: Minoru Tōjō (Japan) |

| 3 September 2014 Exhibition game | United Arab Emirates | 1–1 | Lithuania | Matrei in Osttirol, Austria |
| 18:30 UTC+2 | Sanqour 90+3' | Report | Matulevičius 42' | Stadium: Tauernstadion; Attendance: 200; Referee: Robert Schörgenhofer (Austria) |

| 8 September 2014 2016 UECQ | San Marino | 0–2 | Lithuania | Serravalle, San Marino |
| 20:45 UTC+2 | | Report | Matulevičius 5'; Novikovas 36' | Stadium: San Marino Stadium; Attendance: 986; Referee: Libor Kovařík (Czech Republic) |

| 9 October 2014 2016 UECQ | Lithuania | 1–0 | Estonia | Vilnius, Lithuania |
| 21:45 UTC+3 | Mikoliūnas 76' | Report | | Stadium: LFF Stadium; Attendance: 4,780; Referee: Carlos Clos Gómez (Spain) |

| 12 October 2014 2016 UECQ | Lithuania | 0–2 | Slovenia | Vilnius, Lithuania |
| 21:45 UTC+3 | | Report | Novaković 33', 37' | Stadium: LFF Stadium; Attendance: 4,250; Referee: Michael Koukoulakis (Greece) |

| 15 November 2014 2016 UECQ | Switzerland | 4–0 | Lithuania | St. Gallen, Switzerland |
| 20:45 UTC+1 | Arlauskis 66' (o.g.); Schär 68'; Shaqiri 80', 90' | Report | | Stadium: AFG Arena; Attendance: 17,300; Referee: Svein Oddvar Moen (Norway) |

| 18 November 2014 Exhibition game | Ukraine | 0–0 | Lithuania | Kyiv, Ukraine |
| 21:00 UTC+2 | | Report | | Stadium: Olimpiyskiy National Sports Complex; Attendance: 5,300; Referee: Aliyar Aghayev (Azerbaijan) |

=== 2015 ===
| 27 March 2015 2016 UECQ | England | 4–0 | Lithuania | London, England |
| 19:45 UTC+0 | Rooney 6'; Welbeck 45'; Sterling 58'; Kane 73' | Report | | Stadium: Wembley Stadium; Attendance: 83,671; Referee: Pavel Královec (Czech Republic) |

| 5 June 2015 Exhibition game | Hungary | 4–0 | Lithuania | Debrecen, Hungary |
| 18:30 UTC+2 | Stieber 16'; Dzsudzsák 21'; Nikolić 30'; Priskin 31' | Report | | Stadium: Nagyerdei Stadion; Attendance: 5,218; Referee: Miroslav Zelinka (Czech Republic) |

| 8 June 2015 Exhibition game | Malta | 2–0 | Lithuania | Ta' Qali, Malta |
| 20:00 UTC+2 | Fenech 62'; Effiong 79' | Report | | Stadium: Ta' Qali National Stadium; Attendance: 950; Referee: Sven Bindels (Luxembourg) |

| 14 June 2015 2016 UECQ | Lithuania | 1–2 | Switzerland | Vilnius, Lithuania |
| 21:45 UTC+3 | Černych 64' | Report | Drmić 69'; Shaqiri 84' | Stadium: LFF Stadium; Attendance: 4,786; Referee: Craig Thomson (Scotland) |

| 5 September 2015 2016 UECQ | Estonia | 1–0 | Lithuania | Tallinn, Estonia |
| 19:00 UTC+3 | Vassiljev 71' | Report | | Stadium: A. Le Coq Arena; Attendance: 6,621; Referee: Oliver Drachta (Austria) |

| 8 September 2015 2016 UECQ | Lithuania | 2–1 | San Marino | Vilnius, Lithuania |
| 21:45 UTC+3 | Černych 7'; Spalvis 90+2' | Report | M. Vitaioli 55' | Stadium: LFF Stadium; Attendance: 2,856; Referee: Clayton Pisani (Malta) |

| 9 October 2015 2016 UECQ | Slovenia | 1–1 | Lithuania | Ljubljana, Slovenia |
| 20:45 UTC+2 | Birsa 45+1' (pen.) | Report | Novikovas 79' (pen.) | Stadium: Stožice Stadium; Attendance: 10,498; Referee: Björn Kuipers (Netherlands) |

| 12 October 2015 2016 UECQ | Lithuania | 0–3 | England | Vilnius, Lithuania |
| 21:45 UTC+3 | | Report | Barkley 29'; Arlauskis 35' (o.g.); Oxlade-Chamberlain 62' | Stadium: LFF Stadium; Attendance: 5,051; Referee: Kenn Hansen (Denmark) |

=== 2016 ===
| 23 March 2016 Exhibition game | Romania | 1–0 | Lithuania | Giurgiu, Romania |
| 20:00 UTC+2 | Stanciu 65' | Report | | Stadium: Stadionul Marin Anastasovici; Attendance: 4,368; Referee: David Fernández Borbalán (Spain) |

| 26 March 2016 Exhibition game | Russia | 3–0 | Lithuania | Moscow, Russia |
| 19:00 UTC+3 | Smolov 41'; Golovin 61'; Glushakov 72' | Report | | Stadium: Otkritie Arena; Attendance: 35,406; Referee: Daniele Orsato (Italy) |

| 29 May 2016 2016 Baltic Cup | Lithuania | 2–0 | Estonia | Klaipėda, Lithuania |
| 16:00 UTC+3 | Valskis 30'; Černych 45' | Report | | Stadium: Klaipėdos centrinis stadionas Attendance: 3,700; Referee: Aleksandrs Anufrijevs (Latvia) |

| 1 June 2016 2016 Baltic Cup | Latvia | 2–1 | Lithuania | Liepāja, Latvia |
| 19:30 UTC+3 | Zjuzins 50'; Rudņevs 72' | Report | Černych 84' | Stadium: Daugava Stadium; Attendance: 2,305; Referee: Roomer Tarajev (Estonia) |

| 6 June 2016 Exhibition game | Poland | 0–0 | Lithuania | Kraków, Poland |
| 18:00 UTC+2 | | Report | | Stadium: Stadion Miejski im. Henryka Reymana; Attendance: 33,027; Referee: Filip Glova (Slovakia) |

| 4 September 2016 2018 WCQ | Lithuania | 2–2 | Slovenia | Vilnius, Lithuania |
| 19:00 UTC+3 | Černych 32'; Slivka 34' | Report (FIFA); Report (UEFA) | Krhin 77'; Cesar 90+3' | Stadium: LFF Stadium; Attendance: 4,114; Referee: Artur Soares Dias (Portugal) |

| 8 October 2016 2018 WCQ | Scotland | 1–1 | Lithuania | Glasgow, Scotland |
| 19:45 UTC+1 | McArthur 89' | Report (FIFA); Report (UEFA) | Černych 59' | Stadium: Hampden Park; Attendance: 35,966; Referee: Tobias Stieler (Germany) |

| 11 October 2016 2018 WCQ | Lithuania | 2–0 | Malta | Vilnius, Lithuania |
| 21:45 UTC+3 | Černych 76'; Novikovas 84' (pen.) | Report (FIFA); Report (UEFA) | | Stadium: LFF Stadium; Attendance: 5,067; Referee: Jesús Gil Manzano (Spain) |

| 11 November 2016 2018 WCQ | Slovakia | 4–0 | Lithuania | Trnava, Slovakia |
| 20:45 UTC+1 | Nemec 12'; Kucka 15'; Škrtel 36'; Hamšík 86' | Report (FIFA); Report (UEFA) | | Stadium: Štadión Antona Malatinského; Attendance: 9,653; Referee: Anastasios Sidiropoulos (Greece) |

=== 2017 ===
| 22 March 2017 Exhibition game | Czech Republic | 3–0 | Lithuania | Ústí nad Labem, Czech Republic |
| 18:00 UTC+1 | Hořava 48' (pen.); Jankto 64'; Krmenčík 79' | Report | | Stadium: Městský Stadion; Attendance: 3,959; Referee: Alain Bieri (Switzerland) |

| 26 March 2017 2018 WCQ | England | 2–0 | Lithuania | London, England |
| 17:00 UTC+1 | Defoe 22'; Vardy 66' | Report (FIFA); Report (UEFA) | | Stadium: Wembley Stadium; Attendance: 77,690; Referee: Ruddy Buquet (France) |

| 10 June 2017 2018 WCQ | Lithuania | 1–2 | Slovakia | Vilnius, Lithuania |
| 21:45 UTC+3 | Novikovas 90+3' | Report (FIFA); Report (UEFA) | Weiss 32'; Hamšík 58' | Stadium: LFF Stadium; Attendance: 4,083; Referee: Manuel Gräfe (Germany) |

| 1 September 2017 2018 WCQ | Lithuania | 0–3 | Scotland | Vilnius, Lithuania |
| 21:45 UTC+3 | | Report (FIFA); Report (UEFA) | Armstrong 25'; Robertson 30'; McArthur 72' | Stadium: LFF Stadium; Attendance: 5,067; Referee: Carlos del Cerro Grande (Spain) |

| 4 September 2017 2018 WCQ | Slovenia | 4–0 | Lithuania | Ljubljana, Malta |
| 20:45 UTC+2 | Iličić 25' (pen.), 61' (pen.); Verbič 82'; Birsa 90' | Report (FIFA); Report (UEFA) | | Stadium: Stožice Stadium; Attendance: 6,230; Referee: István Kovács (Romania) |

| 5 October 2017 2018 WCQ | Malta | 1–1 | Lithuania | Attard, Malta |
| 20:45 UTC+2 | Agius 23' | Report (FIFA); Report (UEFA) | Slivka 53' | Stadium: National Stadium; Attendance: 3,431; Referee: Zaven Hovhannisyan (Armenia) |

| 8 October 2017 2018 WCQ | Lithuania | 0–1 | England | Vilnius, Lithuania |
| 19:00 UTC+3 | | Report (FIFA); Report (UEFA) | Kane 27' (pen.) | Stadium: LFF Stadium; Attendance: 5,067; Referee: Orel Grinfeeld (Israel) |

=== 2018 ===
| 24 March 2018 Exhibition game | Georgia | 4–0 | Lithuania | Tbilisi, Georgia |
| 19:00 UTC+4 | Papunashvili 15'; Kvilitaia 23'; Qazaishvili 31' (pen.); Chakvetadze 40' | Report | | Stadium: Mikheil Meskhi Stadium; Attendance: 18,000; Referee: Alexandru Tean (Moldova) |

| 27 March 2018 Exhibition game | Armenia | 0–1 | Lithuania | Yerevan, Armenia |
| 19:00 UTC+4 | | Report | Verbickas 45' | Stadium: Vazgen Sargsyan Republican Stadium; Attendance: 4,300; Referee: Irakli Kvirikashvili (Georgia) |

| 30 May 2018 2018 Baltic Cup | Estonia | 2–0 | Lithuania | Rakvere, Estonia |
| 19:00 UTC+3 | Ojamaa 23'; Käit 42' | Report | | Stadium: Rakvere linnastaadion Attendance: 1,460; Referee: Andris Treimanis (Latvia) |

| 5 June 2018 2018 Baltic Cup | Lithuania | 1–1 | Latvia | Vilnius, Lithuania |
| 19:00 UTC+3 | Laukžemis 86' | Report | Dubra 46' | Stadium: LFF Stadium; Attendance: 1,000; Referee: Kristo Tohver (Estonia) |

| 8 June 2018 Exhibition game | Iran | 1–0 | Lithuania | Moscow, Russia |
| 18:00 UTC+3 | Ansarifard 88' | Report | | Stadium: Otkritie Training Arena; Attendance: 0 Referee: Aleksei Eskov (Russia) |

| 12 June 2018 Exhibition game | Poland | 4–0 | Lithuania | Warsaw, Poland |
| 18:00 UTC+2 | Lewandowski 19', 32'; Kownacki 71'; Błaszczykowski 82' (pen.) | Report | | Stadium: National Stadium; Attendance: 53,803; Referee: Kevin Blom (Netherlands) |

| 7 September 2018 Nations League C | Lithuania | 0–1 | Serbia | Vilnius, Lithuania |
| 21:45 UTC+3 | | Report | Tadić 38' (pen.) | Stadium: LFF Stadium; Attendance: 4,378; Referee: Bobby Madden (Scotland) |

| 10 September 2018 Nations League C | Montenegro | 2–0 | Lithuania | Podgorica, Montenegro |
| 20:45 UTC+2 | Savić 34' (pen.); Janković 35' | Report | | Stadium: City Stadium; Attendance: 5,239; Referee: Jakob Kehlet (Denmark) |

| 11 October 2018 Nations League C | Lithuania | 1–2 | Romania | Vilnius, Lithuania |
| 21:45 UTC+3 | Žulpa 90' | Report | Chipciu 13'; Maxim 90+4' | Stadium: LFF Stadium; Attendance: 2,279; Referee: François Letexier (France) |

| 14 October 2018 Nations League C | Lithuania | 1–4 | Montenegro | Vilnius, Lithuania |
| 21:45 UTC+3 | Baravykas 88' | Report | Mugoša 10', 45+1' (pen.); Kopitović 35'; Zorić 86' | Stadium: LFF Stadium; Attendance: 1,515; Referee: Robert Schörgenhofer (Austria) |

| 17 November 2018 Nations League C | Romania | 3–0 | Lithuania | Ploiești, Romania |
| 21:45 UTC+2 | Pușcaș 7'; Keșerü 47'; Stanciu 65' | Report | | Stadium: Ilie Oană Stadium; Attendance: 34 (Note: The Romania v Lithuania match was played behind closed doors due to a UEFA punishment against Romania for racist behaviour in their 2018–19 UEFA Nations League home match against Serbia.); Referee: Marco Guida (Italy) |

| 20 November 2018 Nations League C | Serbia | 4–1 | Lithuania | Belgrade, Serbia |
| 20:45 UTC+1 | Žulpa 51' (o.g.); Mitrović 58'; Prijović 71'; Ljajić 74' | Report | Petravičius 64' | Stadium: Partizan Stadium; Attendance: 2,088; Referee: Kristo Tohver (Estonia) |

=== 2019 ===
| 22 March 2019 2020 UECQ | Luxembourg | 2–1 | Lithuania | Luxembourg City, Luxembourg |
| 20:45 UTC+1 | Barreiro 45'; Rodrigues 55' | Report | Černych 14' | Stadium: Stade Josy Barthel; Attendance: 3,353; Referee: Roi Reinshreiber (Israel) |

| 25 March 2019 Exhibition game | Azerbaijan | 0–0 | Lithuania | Baku, Azerbaijan |
| 20:00 UTC+4 | | Report | | Stadium: Bakcell Arena; Attendance: 3,122; Referee: Horațiu Fesnic (Romania) |

| 7 June 2019 2020 UECQ | Lithuania | 1–1 | Luxembourg | Vilnius, Lithuania |
| 21:45 UTC+3 | Novikovas 74' | Report | Rodrigues 21' | Stadium: LFF Stadium; Attendance: 3,263; Referee: Ádám Farkas (Hungary) |

| 10 June 2019 2020 UECQ | Serbia | 4–1 | Lithuania | Belgrade, Serbia |
| 20:45 UTC+2 | A. Mitrović 20', 34'; Jović 35'; Ljajić 90+2' | Report | Novikovas 71' (pen.) | Stadium: Red Star Stadium; Attendance: 52 (Note: Serbia were sanctioned by UEFA to play one home match (against Lithuania on 10 June 2019) without spectators for racist behaviour in their home match against Montenegro.); Referee: Adrien Jaccottet (Switzerland) |

| 7 September 2019 2020 UECQ | Lithuania | 0–3 | Ukraine | Vilnius, Lithuania |
| 19:00 UTC+3 | | Report | Zinchenko 7'; Marlos 27'; Malinovskyi 62' | Stadium: LFF Stadium; Attendance: 5,067; Referee: Irfan Peljto (Bosnia and Herzegovina) |

| 10 September 2019 2020 UECQ | Lithuania | 1–5 | Portugal | Vilnius, Lithuania |
| 21:45 UTC+3 | Andriuškevičius 28' | Report | Ronaldo 7' (pen.), 62', 65', 76'; Carvalho 90+2' | Stadium: LFF Stadium; Attendance: 5,067; Referee: Bas Nijhuis (Netherlands) |

| 11 October 2019 2020 UECQ | Ukraine | 2–0 | Lithuania | Kharkiv, Ukraine |
| 21:45 UTC+3 | Malinovskyi 29', 58' | Report | | Stadium: Metalist Stadium; Referee: Harald Lechner (Austria) |

| 14 October 2019 2020 UECQ | Lithuania | 1–2 | Serbia | Vilnius, Lithuania |
| 21:45 UTC+3 | Kazlauskas 79' | Report | A. Mitrović 49', 53' | Stadium: LFF Stadium; Attendance: 2,787; Referee: Paweł Raczkowski (Poland) |

| 14 November 2019 2020 UECQ | Portugal | 6–0 | Lithuania | Faro/Loulé, Portugal |
| 19:45 UTC+0 | Ronaldo 7' (pen.), 22', 65'; Pizzi 52'; Paciência 56'; B. Silva 63' | Report | | Stadium: Estádio Algarve; Referee: Ruddy Buquet (France) |

| 17 November 2019 Exhibition game | Lithuania | 1–0 | New Zealand | Vilnius, Lithuania |
| 15:00 UTC+2 | Novikovas 45' | Report | | Stadium: LFF Stadium; Attendance: 1,832; Referee: Trustin Farrugia Cann (Malta) |
