= UEFA Euro 2008 qualifying Group B =

Football tournament qualifying stage

Standings and results for Group B of the UEFA Euro 2008 qualifying tournament.

Italy and France secured qualification to the tournament proper on 17 November 2007 following Italy's 2–1 win against Scotland, becoming the fifth and sixth teams in the whole of the qualification stage to do so.

== Standings ==
Pos	Team	Pld	W	D	L	GF	GA	GD	Pts	Qualification	(Italy)	(France)	(Scotland)	(Ukraine)	(Lithuania)	(Georgia (country))	(Faroe Islands)
1	Italy	12	9	2	1	22	9	+13	29	Qualify for final tournament	—	0–0	2–0	2–0	1–1	2–0	3–1
2	France	12	8	2	2	25	5	+20	26	Qualify for final tournament	3–1	—	0–1	2–0	2–0	1–0	5–0
3	Scotland	12	8	0	4	21	12	+9	24		1–2	1–0	—	3–1	3–1	2–1	6–0
4	Ukraine	12	5	2	5	18	16	+2	17		1–2	2–2	2–0	—	1–0	3–2	5–0
5	Lithuania	12	5	1	6	11	13	−2	16		0–2	0–1	1–2	2–0	—	1–0	2–1
6	Georgia	12	3	1	8	16	19	−3	10		1–3	0–3	2–0	1–1	0–2	—	3–1
7	Faroe Islands	12	0	0	12	4	43	−39	0		1–2	0–6	0–2	0–2	0–1	0–6	—

Source: UEFA
Rules for classification: Qualification tiebreakers

== Matches ==
Group B fixtures were decided with a random draw conducted on Thursday 9 March 2006, because fixtures could not be agreed between delegates. Ukraine was the only side unable to come to a consensus with the rest of the group.

16 August 2006
18:00 UTC+1

Faroe Islands	0–6	Georgia
	Report	Mujiri 16'; Iashvili 18'; Arveladze 37', 62', 82'; Kobiashvili 51' (pen.)

Svangaskard, Toftir
Attendance: 2,114
Referee: Michael Ross (Northern Ireland)

2 September 2006
15:00 UTC+1

Scotland	6–0	Faroe Islands
Fletcher 7'; McFadden 10'; Boyd 24' (pen.), 38'; Miller 30' (pen.); O'Connor 85'	Report

Celtic Park, Glasgow
Attendance: 50,059
Referee: Igor Egorov (Russia)
2 September 2006
20:00 UTC+4

Georgia	0–3	France
	Report	Malouda 7'; Saha 15'; Asatiani 47' (o.g.)

Boris Paichadze Stadium, Tbilisi
Attendance: 53,500
Referee: Jan Wegereef (Netherlands)
2 September 2006
20:50 UTC+2

Italy	1–1	Lithuania
Inzaghi 30'	Report	Danilevičius 21'

Stadio San Paolo, Naples
Attendance: 43,440
Referee: Martin Hansson (Sweden)

6 September 2006
19:00 UTC+3

Ukraine	3–2	Georgia
Shevchenko 31'; Rotan 61'; Rusol 80'	Report	Arveladze 38'; Demetradze 60'

NSC Olimpiysky, Kyiv
Attendance: 35,000
Referee: Jaroslav Jara (Czech Republic)
6 September 2006
19:30 UTC+3

Lithuania	1–2	Scotland
Miceika 85'	Report	Dailly 46'; Miller 62'

S.Darius and S.Girėnas, Kaunas
Attendance: 6,500
Referee: Vladimir Hrinak (Slovakia)
6 September 2006
21:00 UTC+2

France	3–1	Italy
Govou 2', 55'; Henry 18'	Report	Gilardino 20'

Stade de France, Saint-Denis
Attendance: 78,831
Referee: Herbert Fandel (Germany)

7 October 2006
15:00 UTC+1

Faroe Islands	0–1	Lithuania
	Report	Skerla 89'

Tórsvøllur, Tórshavn
Attendance: 1,982
Referee: Anthony Buttimer (Ireland)
7 October 2006
17:00 UTC+1

Scotland	1–0	France
Caldwell 67'	Report

Hampden Park, Glasgow
Attendance: 50,456
Referee: Massimo Busacca (Switzerland)
7 October 2006
20:50 UTC+2

Italy	2–0	Ukraine
Oddo 71' (pen.); Toni 79'	Report

Stadio Olimpico, Rome
Attendance: 49,149
Referee: Kyros Vassaras (Greece)

11 October 2006
19:00 UTC+3

Ukraine	2–0	Scotland
Kucher 60'; Shevchenko 90' (pen.)	Report

NSC Olimpiysky, Kyiv
Attendance: 55,000
Referee: Martin Hansson (Sweden)
11 October 2006
20:00 UTC+4

Georgia	1–3	Italy
Shashiashvili 26'	Report	De Rossi 18'; Camoranesi 63'; Perrotta 71'

Boris Paichadze Stadium, Tbilisi
Attendance: 48,000
Referee: Mike Riley (England)
11 October 2006
21:00 UTC+2

France	5–0	Faroe Islands
Saha 1'; Henry 22'; Anelka 77'; Trezeguet 78', 84'	Report

Stade Auguste Bonal, Montbéliard
Attendance: 19,314
Referee: Sorin Corpodean (Romania)

24 March 2007
15:00 UTC+0

Scotland	2–1	Georgia
Boyd 11'; Beattie 89'	Report	Arveladze 41'

Hampden Park, Glasgow
Attendance: 50,850
Referee: Nicolai Vollquartz (Denmark)
24 March 2007
15:00 UTC+0

Faroe Islands	0–2	Ukraine
	Report	Yezerskiy 20'; Husyev 57'

Svangaskard, Toftir
Attendance: 717
Referee: Damir Skomina (Slovenia)
24 March 2007
19:00 UTC+2

Lithuania	0–1	France
	Report	Anelka 73'

S.Darius and S.Girėnas, Kaunas
Attendance: 8,740
Referee: Howard Webb (England)

28 March 2007
18:00 UTC+3

Ukraine	1–0	Lithuania
Husyev 47'	Report

Chornomorets Stadium, Odesa
Attendance: 33,600
Referee: Florian Meyer (Germany)
28 March 2007
18:00 UTC+4

Georgia	3–1	Faroe Islands
Siradze 25'; Iashvili 46', 90+5' (pen.)	Report	R. Jacobsen 57'

Boris Paichadze Stadium, Tbilisi
Attendance: 12,000
Referee: Pavel Saliy (Kazakhstan)
28 March 2007
20:50 UTC+2

Italy	2–0	Scotland
Toni 12', 70'	Report

Stadio San Nicola, Bari
Attendance: 37,600
Referee: Frank De Bleeckere (Belgium)

2 June 2007
21:00 UTC+3

Lithuania	1–0	Georgia
Mikoliūnas 78'	Report

S.Darius and S.Girėnas, Kaunas
Attendance: 6,400
Referee: Claudio Circhetta (Switzerland)
2 June 2007
21:00 UTC+2

France	2–0	Ukraine
Ribéry 57'; Anelka 71'	Report

Stade de France, Saint-Denis
Attendance: 80,051
Referee: Luis Medina Cantalejo (Spain)
2 June 2007
19:45 UTC+1

Faroe Islands	1–2	Italy
R. Jacobsen 77'	Report	Inzaghi 12', 48'

Tórsvøllur, Tórshavn
Attendance: 5,987
Referee: Robert Małek (Poland)

6 June 2007
17:15 UTC+1

Faroe Islands	0–2	Scotland
	Report	Maloney 31'; O'Connor 35'

Svangaskard, Toftir
Attendance: 4,100
Referee: Georgios Kasnaferis (Greece)
6 June 2007
21:00 UTC+2

France	1–0	Georgia
Nasri 33'	Report

Stade de l'Abbé Deschamps, Auxerre
Attendance: 19,345
Referee: Lucílio Batista (Portugal)
6 June 2007
21:45 UTC+3

Lithuania	0–2	Italy
	Report	Quagliarella 31', 45'

S.Darius and S.Girėnas, Kaunas
Attendance: 7,800
Referee: Pieter Vink (Netherlands)

8 September 2007
15:00 UTC+1

Scotland	3–1	Lithuania
Boyd 31'; McManus 77'; McFadden 83'	Report	Danilevičius 61' (pen.)

Hampden Park, Glasgow
Attendance: 51,349
Referee: Damir Skomina (Slovenia)
8 September 2007
19:00 UTC+4

Georgia	1–1	Ukraine
Siradze 87'	Report	Shelayev 7'

Boris Paichadze Stadium, Tbilisi
Attendance: 24,000
Referee: Alain Hamer (Luxembourg)
8 September 2007
20:50 UTC+2

Italy	0–0	France
	Report

San Siro, Milan
Attendance: 81,200
Referee: Ľuboš Micheľ (Slovakia)

12 September 2007
20:00 UTC+3

Lithuania	2–1	Faroe Islands
Jankauskas 8'; Danilevičius 52'	Report	R. Jacobsen 90+3'

S.Darius and S.Girėnas, Kaunas
Attendance: 5,500
Referee: Tsvetan Georgiev (Bulgaria)
12 September 2007
21:45 UTC+3

Ukraine	1–2	Italy
Shevchenko 71'	Report	Di Natale 41', 77'

Olimpiyskiy National Sports Complex, Kyiv
Attendance: 41,500
Referee: Howard Webb (England)
12 September 2007
21:00 UTC+2

France	0–1	Scotland
	Report	McFadden 64'

Parc des Princes, Paris
Attendance: 43,342
Referee: Konrad Plautz (Austria)

13 October 2007
15:00 UTC+1

Scotland	3–1	Ukraine
Miller 4'; McCulloch 10'; McFadden 68'	Report	Shevchenko 24'

Hampden Park, Glasgow
Attendance: 50,589
Referee: Pieter Vink (Netherlands)
13 October 2007
16:00 UTC+1

Faroe Islands	0–6	France
	Report	Anelka 6'; Henry 8'; Benzema 50', 81'; Rothen 66'; Ben Arfa 90+4'

Tórsvøllur, Tórshavn
Attendance: 1,980
Referee: Gabriele Rossi (San Marino)
13 October 2007
20:50 UTC+2

Italy	2–0	Georgia
Pirlo 44'; Grosso 84'	Report

Stadio Luigi Ferraris, Genoa
Attendance: 23,057
Referee: Carlos Megía Dávila (Spain)

17 October 2007
19:00 UTC+3

Ukraine	5–0	Faroe Islands
Kalynychenko 40', 49'; Husyev 43', 45'; Vorobei 64'	Report

NSC Olympiyskiy Stadium, Kyiv
Attendance: 3,000
Referee: Haim Jakov (Israel)
17 October 2007
21:00 UTC+4

Georgia	2–0	Scotland
Mchedlidze 16'; Siradze 64'	Report

Boris Paichadze Stadium, Tbilisi
Attendance: 29,377
Referee: Knut Kircher (Germany)
17 October 2007
21:00 UTC+2

France	2–0	Lithuania
Henry 80', 81'	Report

Stade de la Beaujoire, Nantes
Attendance: 36,650
Referee: Viktor Kassai (Hungary)

17 November 2007
17:00 UTC+0

Scotland	1–2	Italy
Ferguson 65'	Report	Toni 2'; Panucci 90+1'

Hampden Park, Glasgow
Attendance: 51,301
Referee: Manuel Mejuto González (Spain)
17 November 2007
20:00 UTC+2

Lithuania	2–0	Ukraine
Savėnas 41'; Danilevičius 67'	Report

S.Darius and S.Girėnas, Kaunas
Attendance: 2,800
Referee: David Malcolm (Northern Ireland)

21 November 2007
19:30 UTC+4

Georgia	0–2	Lithuania
	Report	Kšanavičius 52', 90+6'

Boris Paichadze Stadium, Tbilisi
Attendance: 21,300
Referee: Ljubomir Krstevski (Macedonia)
21 November 2007
20:30 UTC+1

Italy	3–1	Faroe Islands
Benjaminsen 11' (o.g.); Toni 36'; Chiellini 41'	Report	R. Jacobsen 83'

Stadio Alberto Braglia, Modena
Attendance: 16,142
Referee: Florian Meyer (Germany)
21 November 2007
21:30 UTC+2

Ukraine	2–2	France
Voronin 14'; Shevchenko 46'	Report	Henry 20'; Govou 34'

NSC Olympiyskiy, Kyiv
Attendance: 7,800
Referee: Tom Henning Øvrebø (Norway)

== Goalscorers ==
There were 117 goals scored in 42 matches, for an average of 2.79 goals per match.

6 goals

- (France) Thierry Henry

5 goals

- (Georgia (country)) Shota Arveladze
- (Italy) Luca Toni
- (Ukraine) Andriy Shevchenko

4 goals

- (Faroe Islands) Rógvi Jacobsen
- (France) Nicolas Anelka
- (Lithuania) Tomas Danilevičius
- (Scotland) Kris Boyd
- (Scotland) James McFadden
- (Ukraine) Oleh Husyev

3 goals

- (France) Sidney Govou
- (Georgia (country)) Aleksandre Iashvili
- (Georgia (country)) David Siradze
- (Italy) Filippo Inzaghi
- (Scotland) Kenny Miller

2 goals

- (France) Karim Benzema
- (France) Louis Saha
- (France) David Trezeguet
- (Italy) Antonio Di Natale
- (Italy) Fabio Quagliarella
- (Lithuania) Audrius Kšanavičius
- (Scotland) Garry O'Connor
- (Ukraine) Maksym Kalynychenko

1 goal

- (France) Hatem Ben Arfa
- (France) Florent Malouda
- (France) Samir Nasri
- (France) Franck Ribéry
- (France) Jérôme Rothen
- (Georgia (country)) Giorgi Demetradze
- (Georgia (country)) Levan Kobiashvili
- (Georgia (country)) Levan Mchedlidze
- (Georgia (country)) Davit Mujiri
- (Georgia (country)) Giorgi Shashiashvili
- (Italy) Mauro Camoranesi
- (Italy) Giorgio Chiellini
- (Italy) Daniele De Rossi
- (Italy) Alberto Gilardino
- (Italy) Fabio Grosso
- (Italy) Massimo Oddo
- (Italy) Christian Panucci
- (Italy) Simone Perrotta
- (Italy) Andrea Pirlo
- (Lithuania) Edgaras Jankauskas
- (Lithuania) Darius Miceika
- (Lithuania) Saulius Mikoliūnas
- (Lithuania) Mantas Savėnas
- (Lithuania) Andrius Skerla
- (Scotland) Craig Beattie
- (Scotland) Gary Caldwell
- (Scotland) Christian Dailly
- (Scotland) Barry Ferguson
- (Scotland) Darren Fletcher
- (Scotland) Shaun Maloney
- (Scotland) Lee McCulloch
- (Scotland) Stephen McManus
- (Ukraine) Oleksandr Kucher
- (Ukraine) Ruslan Rotan
- (Ukraine) Andriy Rusol
- (Ukraine) Oleh Shelayev
- (Ukraine) Andriy Vorobey
- (Ukraine) Andriy Voronin
- (Ukraine) Volodymyr Yezerskiy

1 own goal

- (Faroe Islands) Fróði Benjaminsen (against Italy)
- (Georgia (country)) Malkhaz Asatiani (against France)
