= Confalone =

Confalone is an Italian surname. Notable people with the surname include:

- Marina Confalone (born 1951), Italian actress
- Simone Confalone (born 1974), Italian footballer
