= Francesco Scorsa =

Italian footballer and manager (1946–2023)

Personal information
- Date of birth: 17 December 1946
- Place of birth: Soverato, Italy
- Date of death: 19 August 2023 (aged 76)
- Place of death: Bologna, Italy
- Position: Defender

Senior career*
Years	Team	Apps	(Gls)
1966–1967	Cervia	17	(0)
1968–1971	Cesena	106	(2)
1972–1973	Bologna	13	(0)
1973–1974	Foggia Calcio	11	(0)
1974–1982	Ascoli	214	(2)
1982	→ Toronto Italia (loan)		
1983–1984	Ravenna	20	(0)

Managerial career
- 1985–1986: Catanzaro
- 1987–1988: Fano
- 1988–1989: Licata
- 1989–1990: Messina
- 1990–1991: Nola
- 1991–1992: Vigor Lamezia
- 1993–1994: Nola
- 1993–1994: Casarano
- 1996–1997: Ascoli
- 1997–1998: Casarano
- * Club domestic league appearances and goals

Francesco Scorsa (17 December 1946 – 19 August 2023) was an Italian footballer who played as a defender and a football manager.

== Playing career ==
Scorsa played in the Serie D in 1966 with A.S.D. Cervia 1920. In 1968, he played in the Serie B with Cesena F.C. after four seasons with Cesena he played in the Serie A with Bologna F.C. 1909. He made his Serie A debut on 1 October 1972 against Inter Milan. The following season he played with Foggia Calcio, and later with Ascoli Calcio 1898 F.C. In 1976, he returned to the Serie B with Ascoli, and secured promotion to the Serie A by winning the Serie B in 1977–78.

In 1982, he played abroad in the National Soccer League with Toronto Italia on a loan deal. In 1983, he played in the Serie C2 with Ravenna F.C.

== Managerial career ==
Scorsa became a head coach in 1985 with U.S. Catanzaro 1929. He managed teams in the Serie B such as Messina, and A.S.D. Licata 1931. He also managed Alma Juventus Fano 1906, A.S.D. F.C. S.S. Nola 1925, Vigor Lamezia, S.S.D. Casarano Calcio, and Ascoli Calcio 1898 F.C.

== Death ==
Scorsa died on 19 August 2023, at the age of 76.
