= Stadio Dino Liotta =

Coordinates: 37.1025°N 13.9431°E

- Interactive map of Stadio Dino Liotta
- Location: Licata, Italy
- Capacity: 11,000

Construction
- Built: 1988
- Renovated: 2023

Tenant
- Licata Calcio 1931

Stadio Dino Liotta is an arena in Licata, Italy. It is primarily used for football, and is the home to the Licata Calcio 1931 of the Serie D. It opened in 1988 and holds 11,000 spectators.
