= ASD Licata Calcio =

Italian football club

Licata
- Full name: Associazione Sportiva Dilettantistica Licata Calcio
- Nicknames: Gialloblu (Yellow-blues); I Santi (The Saints); Le Aquile (The Eagles)
- Founded: 1931
- Ground: Stadio Dino Liotta, Licata, Italy
- Capacity: 12,000
- Chairman: Enrico Massimino
- Manager: Giuseppe Russo
- League: Serie D
- 2026–27: Serie D/I, 10th
Home colours	Away colours

Associazione Sportiva Dilettantistica Licata Calcio is an Italian association football club located in Licata, Sicily.

Licata is a historical Sicilian team, and one of the six Sicilian football clubs to have ever reached the Serie B league in Italian football history.

The club currently plays in Serie D.

== History ==
The club was founded in 1931 as Associazione Calcio Licata by a few local students who discovered the game of association football thanks to some Swedish sailors who worked in the area; the official team colours, in fact, refer to the flag of Sweden. The club was renamed Polisportiva Licata in 1967.

The first appearance of Licata in a professional league, is dated in 1982 within Serie C2. During the 1984–85 season, Licata, coached by a young Zdeněk Zeman, won Serie C2 and was promoted to Serie C1, despite a team composed almost entirely by players from the youth squad.

In 1988, with Aldo Cerantola as coach, Licata won also Serie C1/B, and was promoted to Serie B for the first time in the club's history. During its first season in the Italian second division, with Giuseppe Papadopulo as a coach, then replaced by Francesco Scorsa, Licata ended in ninth place; finishing above Parma. They also achieved the honor of playing a Coppa Italia match at the Stadio San Siro against AC Milan.

The following season however, Licata were relegated to Serie C1 after finishing in 18th position. A couple of seasons later, in 1991–92 they were relegated down to Serie C2. They were then relegated in the 1992–94 season, and were set to compete in the CND league, but slow decay for the Sicilian club was complete and they became bankrupt in 1994.

=== Refoundations ===
A new club, Licata AC, was then founded and admitted to the regional Eccellenza league. But in 1996, after having daringly avoided relegation, Licata AC did not register to Eccellenza and was cancelled too; a new team, Santos Licata (then Nuovo Licata, that finally switched to the current denomination), started from Promozione (7th level in the Italian football league system).

During the 2005–06 season, Licata won the round A of Sicilian Eccellenza, consequently returning to Serie D for the first time for a decade.

In the season 2010–11 it was promoted from Eccellenza Sicily group A to Serie D.

A new club was created in 2014 after another bankruptcy.

== Colors and badge ==
The traditional club colours of Licata is yellow and blue; known in Italy as gialloblu. The club has two other nicknames; I Santi which means The Saints, and I Falchi which translates as The Hawks.

== Notable former managers ==
- (Italy) Aldo Cerantola
- (Italy) Giuseppe Papadopulo
- (Czech Republic) (Italy) Zdeněk Zeman

== Honours ==
Serie C1

- Champions: 1987–88

Serie C2

- Champions: 1984–85
