= 2010 Baltic Cup =

Football club tournament held between the top clubs from Baltic states

Tournament details
- Host country: Lithuania
- Dates: 18–20 June
- Teams: 3
- Venue(s): 1 (in 1 host city)

Final positions
- Champions: Lithuania (10th title)
- Runners-up: Latvia
- Third place: Estonia

Tournament statistics
- Matches played: 3
- Goals scored: 2 (0.67 per match)
- Attendance: 1,900 (633 per match)
- Top scorer(s): (Lithuania) Mantas Savėnas (Lithuania) Artūras Rimkevičius (1 goal)

The Lithuania Baltic Cup 2010 football competition was held from 18 June to 20 June 2010 at the S. Darius and S. Girėnas Stadium in Kaunas, Lithuania.

Hosts Lithuania together with Latvia and Estonia are the teams who played in this tournament.

== Results ==
Team	Pld	W	D	L	GF	GA	GD	Pts
Lithuania	2	1	1	0	2	0	2	4
Latvia	2	0	2	0	0	0	0	2
Estonia	2	0	1	1	0	2	–2	1

18 June
18:10 EEST (UTC+03)

Lithuania	0 – 0	Latvia
	Report

S. Darius and S. Girėnas Stadium, Kaunas
Attendance: 1,000
Referee: Hannes Kaasik (Estonia)
19 June
18:10 EEST (UTC+03)

Latvia	0 – 0	Estonia
	Report

S. Darius and S. Girėnas Stadium, Kaunas
Attendance: 300
Referee: Gediminas Mažeika (Lithuania)
20 June
18:10 EEST (UTC+03)

Estonia	0 – 2	Lithuania
	Report	31' Savėnas; 90+2' Rimkevičius

S. Darius and S. Girėnas Stadium, Kaunas
Attendance: 600
Referee: Andrejs Sipailo (Latvia)

== Winners ==
2010 Baltic Football Cup winners

Lithuania
Tenth title

== Statistics ==
=== Goalscorers ===
There were 2 goals scored in 3 matches, for an average of 0.667 goals per match.

1 goal

- (Lithuania) Mantas Savėnas
- (Lithuania) Artūras Rimkevičius

== Under-21 ==
The Under-21 tournament was played on the same dates as the main tournament, from 18 June to 20 June. Sūduva Sports Centre Stadium in Marijampolė hosted all three matches.

=== Results ===
Team	Pld	W	D	L	GF	GA	GD	Pts
Lithuania	2	1	1	0	3	2	+1	4
Latvia	2	1	0	1	2	2	0	3
Estonia	2	0	1	1	1	2	–1	1

18 June
13:00 EEST (UTC+03)

Lithuania	2 – 1	Latvia
Povilas Krasnovskis 33'; Marius Papšys 76'	Report	90' Daniils Turkovs

Sūduva Sports Centre Stadium, Marijampolė
Referee: Audrius Kancleris (Lithuania)
19 June
13:00 EEST (UTC+03)

Latvia	1 – 0	Estonia
Artjoms Osipovs 45'	Report

Sūduva Sports Centre Stadium, Marijampolė
Attendance: 50
Referee: Nerijus Dunauskas (Lithuania)
20 June
13:00 EEST (UTC+03)

Estonia	1 – 1	Lithuania
Jüri Jevdokimov 72'	Report	59' Eivinas Zagurskas

Sūduva Sports Centre Stadium, Marijampolė
Referee: Sergejus Sylva (Lithuania)

== Under-19 ==
The tournament for under-19 teams was held from 25 June to 27 June in Palanga and Kretinga, at Palanga Stadium and Kretinga City Stadium respectively.

=== Results ===
Team	Pld	W	D	L	GF	GA	GD	Pts
Lithuania	2	1	1	0	4	3	+1	4
Estonia	2	0	2	0	2	2	0	2
Latvia	2	0	1	1	3	4	–1	1

25 June
18:00 EEST (UTC+03)

Lithuania	1 – 1	Estonia
Žilvinas Česnulis 56'	Report	Karl Mööl 4'

Palanga Stadium, Palanga
26 June
15:00 EEST (UTC+03)

Estonia	1 – 1	Latvia
Stanislav Goldberg 36'	Report	Artjoms Lonšakovs 69'

Kretinga City Stadium, Kretinga
27 June
14:00 EEST (UTC+03)

Latvia	2 – 3	Lithuania
Artjoms Lonšakovs 26'; Edgars Jermolajevs 31'	Report	Mindaugas Grigaravičius 10', 54'; Justas Vilavičius 72'

Palanga Stadium, Palanga

== Under-17 ==
The tournament for under-17 teams was held from 25 June to 27 June in Palanga and Kretinga, at Palanga Stadium and Kretinga City Stadium respectively.

=== Results ===
Team	Pld	W	D	L	GF	GA	GD	Pts
Latvia	2	2	0	0	6	2	+4	6
Lithuania	2	1	0	1	2	2	0	3
Estonia	2	0	0	2	2	6	–4	0

25 June
16:00 EEST (UTC+03)

Lithuania	2 – 0	Estonia
Gabrielius Judickas 75'; Armandas Breivė 76'	Report

Palanga Stadium, Palanga
26 June
13:00 EEST (UTC+03)

Estonia	2 – 4	Latvia
Kevin Kauber 30'; Endijs Šlampe 72'	Report	Dāvis Ikaunieks 33', 61'; Valērijs Šabala 49', 80'

Kretinga City Stadium, Kretinga
27 June
12:00 EEST (UTC+03)

Latvia	2 – 0	Lithuania
Valērijs Šabala 6', 33'	Report

Palanga Stadium, Palanga
