= Giorgio Corona =

Italian footballer

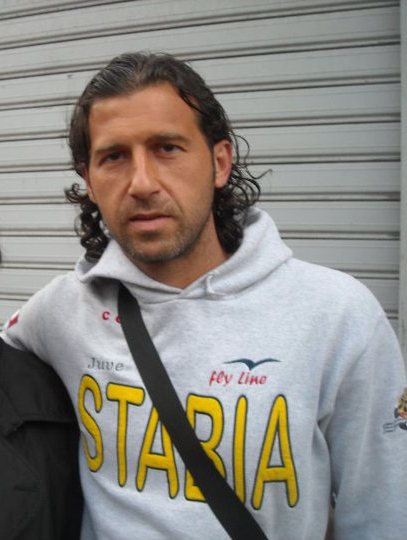

Personal information
- Date of birth: 15 May 1974 (age 52)
- Place of birth: Palermo, Italy
- Height: 1.90 m (6 ft 3 in)
- Position: Striker

Senior career*
Years	Team	Apps	(Gls)
1992–1997	Cinisi		
1997–1998	Milazzo	33	(19)
1998–2002	Messina	27	(3)
1999–2000	→ Tricase (loan)	33	(10)
2000–2001	→ Campobasso (loan)	32	(15)
2001–2002	→ Giugliano (loan)	25	(14)
2002–2003	Brindisi	31	(20)
2003–2006	Catanzaro	109	(46)
2006–2007	Catania	31	(7)
2007–2009	Mantova	66	(17)
2009–2011	Taranto	33	(8)
2010–2011	→ Juve Stabia (loan)	31	(13)
2011–2015	Messina	126	(52)
2015	Scordia	11	(2)
2015–2018	Atletico Catania	40	(23)
- * Club domestic league appearances and goals

Giorgio Corona (born 15 May 1974) is an Italian former professional footballer who played as a forward.

== Career ==
Corona joined Brindisi in 2002 in co-ownership deal, from Messina. In 2003, Brindisi acquired the remain 50% registration rights. He then joined Catanzaro in 2003. In June 2006 he was signed by Calcio Catania.

He joined Mantova in July 2007. In 2009, he left for Taranto. In 2010, he was signed by Juve Stabia, winning the promotion playoffs to Serie B.

In August 2011 he terminated his contract with Taranto and returned to Sicily for Serie D club A.C.R. Messina.

He retired in 2018 after having played for Atletico Catania.

== Personal life ==
Corona's son Giacomo (born 2004) followed in his father's footsteps, and is currently a youth player for Palermo, being also included as part of the first team squad for the 2021–22 Serie C season.
