= Giuseppe Russo =

Italian footballer

Personal information
- Date of birth: 27 June 1983 (age 43)
- Place of birth: Catania, Italy
- Height: 1.83 m (6 ft 0 in)
- Position: Midfielder

Youth career
- 1995–1999: Atletico Catania
- 1999–2001: Crotone

Senior career*
Years	Team	Apps	(Gls)
2001–2002	Crotone	9	(0)
2002–2003	Messina	3	(0)
2004	→ Paternò (loan)	15	(4)
2004–2005	Rimini	21	(1)
2005	Catanzaro	11	(1)
2006	Grosseto	28	(5)
2007	Cavese	13	(1)
2007–2009	Gallipoli	61	(11)
2009–2013	Hellas Verona	86	(6)
2012–2013	→ Ascoli (loan)	30	(2)
2013–2015	Lumezzane	17	(2)
2014–2015	→ Ternana (loan)	30	(0)
2015–2017	Catania	10	(0)
2016	→ Messina (loan)	8	(0)
2017	Siracusa	6	(0)
2017–2018	Biancavilla	0	(0)
2018–2019	Acireale	16	(0)
Total		364	(33)

Managerial career
- 2020–2021: Padova (assistant)
- 2023: Mantova (assistant)
- 2023–2024: CFR Cluj (assistant)
- 2026–: Licata
- * Club domestic league appearances and goals

Giuseppe Russo (born 27 June 1983) is an Italian former footballer who plays as a midfielder and head coach for Italian Serie D club Licata.

== Honours ==
Rimini

- Serie C1: 2004–05
- Supercoppa di Serie C: 2005

Gallipoli

- Lega Pro Prima Divisione: 2008–09
- Supercoppa di Lega Pro: 2009
