= Italo Mattioli =

Italian footballer

Personal information
- Date of birth: April 17, 1985 (age 41)
- Place of birth: Aversa, Italy
- Height: 1.68 m (5 ft 6 in)
- Position: Striker

Team information
- Current team: Latina

Senior career*
Years	Team	Apps	(Gls)
2001–2002	Foggia	2	(0)
2002–2008	Lecce	2	(0)
2005–2006	→ Catanzaro (loan)	19	(2)
2006	→ Salernitana (loan)	17	(3)
2007	→ Taranto (loan)	8	(1)
2007–2008	→ Legnano (loan)	26	(3)
2008–2010	Foggia	18	(1)
2011–2012	Latina		

International career^{‡}
2004	Italy U-20	1	(0)
- * Club domestic league appearances and goals as of 18:29, 4 May 2010 (UTC) ‡ National team caps and goals as of October 20, 2004

Italo Mattioli (born April 17, 1985 in Aversa) is an Italian professional football player.

He played 2 games in the Serie A in the 2004/05 season for U.S. Lecce. In January 2011 he signed a short-term contract with Latina.
