= Domenico De Simone =

Italian politician (1926–2019)

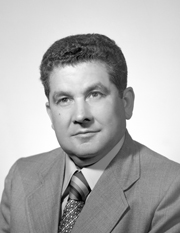
De Simone in 1976

Domenico De Simone (31 May 1926 – 11 June 2019) was an Italian politician. A member of the Communist Party (PCI), he served as a Senator during Legislature VII (1976–1979) prior to being elected to the Chamber of Deputies during Legislature VIII (1979–1983). De Simone was born in Torremaggiore and served as the town's mayor between 1960 and 1976.

De Simone died on 11 June 2019 in Torremaggiore, at the age of 93.

== Biography ==
A member of the Communist Youth Movement since 1943 and later of the Italian Communist Party (PCI) since 1945, he played a leading role in the struggles of the farm laborers’ movement from a very young age. He was arrested in November 1949 during the farm laborers’ strike and the occupation of uncultivated land, during which the farm laborers Lavacca and Lamedica were killed by a carabiniere. In 1958, he was elected councilor for the Province of Foggia, and in 1960, he became mayor of Torremaggiore; he held the office until 1976. Among the achievements of the municipal administrations he led are the implementation of the zoning plan and the establishment of the social and health counseling center, improvements to urban roads and public lighting, and the founding of the music school, the municipal preschool, and daycare centers.

Elected to the Senate on June 20, 1976, in the Lucera constituency with 34,164 preference votes, he joined the Committee on Constitutional and Internal Affairs and the Foreign Affairs Committee at the Senate. In the subsequent general election on June 3, 1979, he was elected to the Chamber of Deputies in the Bari district with 23,778 preference votes and joined the Agriculture Committee in the Chamber of Deputies. He concluded his parliamentary career in 1983.

A national leader of the Legacoop, he lived in Torremaggiore, where he died at the age of 93.
