= Eder Baù =

Italian footballer (born 1982)

Personal information
- Full name: Eder Baù
- Date of birth: 16 August 1982 (age 44)
- Place of birth: Asiago, Italy
- Height: 1.78 m (5 ft 10 in)
- Position: Striker

Youth career
- 2000–2001: A.C. Milan

Senior career*
Years	Team	Apps	(Gls)
2001–2006	Triestina	123	(13)
2006	→ Pescara (loan)	14	(0)
2006–2007	Spezia	12	(0)
2007	→ Crotone (loan)	15	(2)
2007–2009	Padova	48	(10)
2009–2010	Pro Patria	11	(0)
2010–2011	Trento	22	(7)
Total		258	(32)
- * Club domestic league appearances and goals

Eder Baù (born 16 August 1982) is an Italian footballer who plays as a striker.

== Career ==
Baù started his career at A.C. Milan. He was loaned to Triestina in Serie C1 in the summer of 2001. Following Triestina's promotion to Serie B, the club bought half of his license for 200 million lire and later acquired his full license in summer 2005. He played over 100 games for Triestina, but in January 2006, he was loaned to Pescara with an option to obtain half of the player's license. On 7 July 2006, Triestina sold half of Baù's registration rights to newly promoted side Spezia, and the other half to Pescara. Baù failed to score and was loaned to another relegation struggler, Serie B side F.C. Crotone.

After Spezia won the relegation playoffs and remained in Serie B, Spezia bought the newly relegated Pescara's half of the player for €30,000.

Baù played once for Spezia during the 2007–08 season before half of his license was sold to Padova of Serie C1. In September 2009, he terminated his contract with the club one year early. He then played for Pro Patria and Serie D team Trento.
