= Ciro De Franco =

Italian footballer (born 1988)

Personal information
- Date of birth: 8 October 1988 (age 38)
- Place of birth: Naples, Italy
- Height: 1.85 m (6 ft 1 in)
- Position: Defender

Team information
- Current team: ASD Calcio San Cataldo
- Number: 55

Senior career*
Years	Team	Apps	(Gls)
2005–2010	Catanzaro	20	(0)
2006–2007	→ Scafatese (loan)	26	(1)
2010–2013	Nocerina	74	(0)
2013	Cuneo	9	(0)
2013–2018	Matera	104	(0)
2018–2020	Monopoli	63	(1)
2020–2021	Cavese	35	(0)
2021–2023	Picerno	46	(0)
2023	Fidelis Andria	11	(0)
2023	Paganese	6	(0)
2023–	Angri	4	(1)
- * Club domestic league appearances and goals as of 20 December 2023

Ciro De Franco (born 8 October 1988) è un allenatore di calcio ed ex calciatore italiano, di ruolo difensore, tecnico dell’Asd Calcio San Cataldo

== Monopoli ==
On 31 May 2018, after 5 years spent with Matera, it was announced that he signed a contract with Monopoli.

On 14 August 2020 he joined Cavese on a 2-year contract. Following Cavese's relegation to Serie D at the end of the 2020–21 season, on 6 August 2021 he moved to Picerno.

On 17 January 2023, De Franco signed with Fidelis Andria.
