= Artūras Rimkevičius =

Lithuanian footballer (1983–2019)

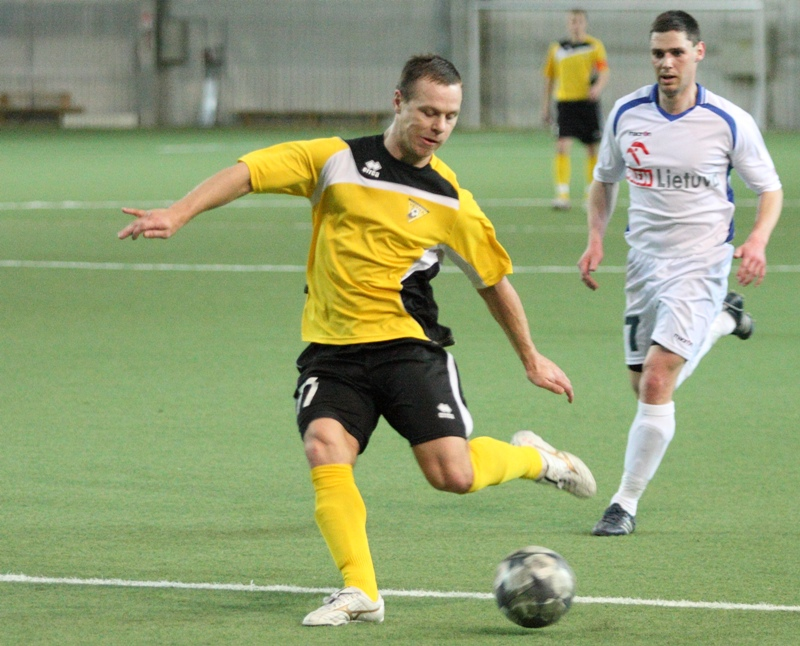

Personal information
- Full name: Artūras Rimkevičius
- Date of birth: 14 April 1983
- Place of birth: Kaunas, Lithuania
- Date of death: 23 September 2019 (aged 36)
- Place of death: Ramučiai, Kaunas district, Lithuania
- Height: 1.82 m (6 ft 0 in)
- Position: Striker

Senior career*
Years	Team	Apps	(Gls)
2001	FK Tauras Tauragė	6	(0)
2002–2003	FBK Kaunas	26	(3)
2003–2005	FK Liepājas Metalurgs	41	(16)
2005–2006	FK Silute	12	(1)
2006–2007	FK Šiauliai	20	(2)
2007–2009	FK Bekentas	39	(17)
2009–2010	Atlantis FC	9	(5)
2010–2011	Asteras Tripolis	1	(0)
2011	→ Ethnikos Piraeus (loan)	4	(1)
2011–2013	FK Šiauliai	44	(44)
2013	FK Ekranas	10	(6)
2013	Brunei DPMM FC	11	(4)
2014–2016	FC Stumbras	53	(27)
Total		256	(118)

International career
2010–2012	Lithuania	7	(3)
- * Club domestic league appearances and goals

Artūras Rimkevičius (14 April 1983 – 23 September 2019) was a Lithuanian footballer who played as a striker.

== Career ==
=== Club ===
Artūras played for FK Tauras Tauragė, FBK Kaunas, FK Liepājas Metalurgs, FK Silute, FK Šiauliai, FK Bekentas, Atlantis FC. and Asteras Tripolis

Artūras is the current holder of the Lithuanian football record of most goals scored in a single season, 35.

Artūras was expected to complete a move to Scottish team Heart of Midlothian in January 2013. However the deal did not go through. He played for 2012 Singapore League Runners-up and League Cup champions, Brunei DPMM FC.

In May 2014, he returned to Kaunas and signed with FC Stumbras.

=== National ===
Artūras made his international debut against Latvia in June 2010, scoring three times for his country in seven caps, once against Estonia and twice against Armenia.

== International goals ==
No.	Date	Venue	Opponent	Score	Result	Competition
1.	20 June 2010	Darius and Girėnas Stadium, Kaunas, Lithuania	Estonia	2–0	2–0	2010 Baltic Cup

== Death and tributes ==
On 23 September 2019, Rimkevičius died from suicide by gunshot aged 36.

Since 2019 A Lyga season, the A Lyga Top Scorer award has been posthumously renamed as Artūras Rimkevičius Trophy.
