= Simone Rizzato =

Italian footballer

Personal information
- Date of birth: 21 September 1981 (age 45)
- Place of birth: Terracina, Italy
- Height: 1.74 m (5 ft 8 1/2 in)
- Position: Left midfielder

Youth career
- 1998–1999: Fano

Senior career*
Years	Team	Apps	(Gls)
1998–2001	Fano	65	(6)
2001–2003	Vis Pesaro	60	(2)
2003–2005	Torino	30	(0)
2005	→ Chievo (loan)	0	(0)
2005	Catanzaro	20	(0)
2006	Perugia	10	(0)
2006–2009	Ancona	106	(5)
2009–2013	Reggina	155	(3)
2013–2017	Trapani	157	(3)
2017–2018	Avellino	13	(0)
2018–2019	Vis Pesaro	32	(1)
2019–2021	Atletico Gallo Colbordolo		
2021	Virtus	3	(0)
2021–2022	Atletico Gallo		
- * Club domestic league appearances and goals as of 5 May 2019

Simone Rizzato (born 21 September 1981) is a retired Italian professional football player. A left midfielder, he was the former captain of Reggina Calcio.

== Career ==
Rizzato made his debut in Serie C2 with Fano at the age of 17.

In July 2001 he moved to Vis Pesaro where he played for two seasons in Serie C1.

In July 2003 he was acquired by Torino where in a season and a half he played 30 matches in Serie B, before moving to Chievo Verona on loan, where he remained a few months without ever debuting in Serie A.

In August 2005 he was back in Serie B with Catanzaro and the following January he played once again in Serie C1 with Perugia.

In July 2006 he joined Ancona where he played for two seasons as a starter in Serie C1, after which obtained promotion to Serie B.

In July 2009 he was bought by Reggina and he played 40 matches in domestic league competitions. On the first match day of the 2011–12 Serie B season (Reggina–Modena) he scored his first goal with the amaranth jersey; the game ended in a 4–1 win for Reggina. In the same season he became team captain.

In June 2017, he joined Avellino.

After the 2018–19 season, 37-year old Rizzato decided to leave professional football and left Vis Pesaro to join ASD Atletico Gallo Colbordolo. In May 2022, he announced his retirement.
