= Giampaolo Calzi =

Italian footballer

Personal information
- Date of birth: 9 September 1985 (age 41)
- Place of birth: Varese, Italy
- Height: 1.82 m (6 ft 0 in)
- Position: Midfielder

Senior career*
| Years | Team | Apps | (Gls) |
| 2002–2004 | Castellettese | 25 | (3) |
| 2003–2004 | → Sampdoria (loan) | 0 | (0) |
| 2004–2007 | Sampdoria | 0 | (0) |
| 2004–2005 | → Montevarchi (loan) | 27 | (0) |
| 2005–2006 | → Catanzaro (loan) | 8 | (0) |
| 2006 | → Pavia (loan) | 14 | (0) |
| 2006–2007 | → Ravenna (loan) | 29 | (0) |
| 2007–2011 | Ravenna | 26 | (0) |
| 2008 | → Perugia (loan) | 8 | (0) |
| 2009–2010 | → Lecco (loan) | 25 | (1) |
| 2010–2011 | → Pro Patria (loan) | 19 | (1) |
| 2011–2012 | Reggiana | 21 | (0) |
| 2012–2014 | Pro Patria | 47 | (5) |
| 2014 | Vicenza | 0 | (0) |
| 2014–2015 | Savoia | 8 | (0) |
| 2015 | Pro Patria | 11 | (0) |
| 2015–2016 | Venezia | 18 | (3) |
| 2016–2017 | Varese | 8 | (0) |
| 2017 | Bellinzona | 11 | (1) |
| 2017 | Olginatese | 8 | (0) |
| 2018 | ASD Nibbiano & Valtidone | | |
| 2018–2019 | ASD Busto 81 | | |
| 2019 | AC Vergiatese 1954 | | |
| 2019–2020 | ASD Olimpia Tresiana | | |
| 2020–2021 | AS Castello 1967 | | |
| 2021–2022 | ASD Valle Olona | | |
| Total | | 313 | (14) |
- * Club domestic league appearances and goals

Giampaolo Calzi (born 9 September 1985) is an Italian former footballer who plays as a midfielder.

== Biography ==
=== Serie D career ===
Born in Varese, Lombardy, Calzi started his career at Serie D team Castellettese of Piedmontese town Castelletto sopra Ticino, 20 km away from Varese. He then moved to Ligurian team Sampdoria, but for its Primavera under-20 team in a temporary deal.

Sampdoria acquired him outright in summer 2004.

=== Serie C career ===
Since 2004–05 season Calzi was loaned to various Lega Pro teams (Serie C prior 2008, Italian third and fourth division until 2014), namely Montevarchi, Catanzaro (Serie B) and Pavia (second half of 2005–06 Serie C1).

On 21 June 2006 he was signed by Serie C1 team Ravenna, winning Group B of the Italian third division.

On 6 July 2007 he completed the move to Ravenna in co-ownership deal, for €300,000 transfer fee. He only started 9 times in 2007–08 Serie B and in January 2008 back to Serie C1 for Perugia Calcio.

Ravenna relegated at the end of season, Calzi returned to the city of Ravenna but only with 11 league appearances. In June 2009 Ravenna acquired remain 50% registration rights from Sampdoria for free.

On 10 July 2009 he moved to Lecco of the Group A of Lega Pro Prima Divisione (ex–Serie C1), from the Group B side Ravenna. That season he made 25 starts.

On 1 July 2010 he returned to Romagna again and played the first 2 rounds of 2010–11 Coppa Italia. He also played the second round of 2010–11 Lega Pro Prima Divisione as substitute, but also his last game for the club. On 31 August he was loaned to Pro Patria as part of the deal that Daniele Rosso moved to Ravenna. In Busto Arsizio he re-joined former teammate Ilario Aloe.

On 15 June 2011 he moved to Reggiana in 2-year contract.

In August 2012 he joined Pro Patria. Calzi signed a 2-year contract.

On 10 July 2014 he was signed by Lega Pro Divisione Unica club Vicenza. After the club was promoted to Serie B to replace A.C. Siena, Calzi was transferred to Savoia. In January 2015 he was re-signed by Pro Patria.

=== Switzerland ===
On 6 February 2017 Calzi was signed by Bellinzona. The team, which was from Italian-speaking region of Switzerland, played in 2016–17 1. Liga Classic.
