= Simone Confalone =

Italian footballer

Personal information
- Full name: Simone Confalone
- Date of birth: 1 February 1974 (age 52)
- Place of birth: Rimini, Italy
- Height: 1.93 m (6 ft 4 in)
- Position: Midfielder

Team information
- Current team: La Fiortia
- Number: 8

Youth career
- 1986–92: A.C. Cesena

Senior career*
Years	Team	Apps	(Gls)
1993–94	F.C. Forlì	8	(0)
1994	A.C. Cesena	0	(0)
1994–95	Imola	13	(1)
1995–96	San Marino Calcio	8	(1)
1996–1999	A.S. Cervia	11	(0)
1999–2001	A.S.D. Castel di Sangro Calcio	41	(9)
2001–05	A.C. Cesena	117	(21)
2005–06	A.C. Arezzo	31	(2)
2006–2007	Spezia Calcio	28	(3)
2007–09	Bologna FC	24	(1)
2009–2010	Ternana Calcio	14	(0)
2011	Imolese	11	(2)
2011	Asti	6	(1)
2011–2012	Pelli SantaCroce	11	(1)
2012–	La Fiorita	1	(0)
- * Club domestic league appearances and goals as of 7 July 2012 ‡ National team caps and goals as of 7 July 2012

Simone Confalone is an Italian former football (soccer) player who last played for S.P. La Fiorita in the Campionato Sammarinese di Calcio.

== Club career ==
=== AC Cesena – F.C. Forlì ===
Simone Confalone started his professional career with the youth system of A.C. Cesena in 1986. Before Confalone was promoted to the senior squad for Cesena, he was sold to F.C. Forlì in 1993. He only remained at the club for one season, making just 8 total appearances. He was sold in the summer of 1994 back to AC Cesena, but in a six-month spell, with his original club, he failed to make a single appearance, and was again transferred in January 1995.

=== Imolese Calcio ===
In January 1995, Confalone moved to Imolese Calcio 1919, where he would make 13 appearances, and score his first professional goal.

=== San Marino Calcio ===
After six months with Imola, Confalone moved to Serie C club, San Marino Calcio in the summer of 1995. He managed a single league goal in 8 total appearances for the club in which he remained only for a single season.

=== A.S.D. Cervia 1920 ===
In the summer of 1996, Confalone transferred to A.S.D. Cervia 1920. the experience was again very short of expectations, as due to various injuries, and set backs, he managed just 11 total appearances in 3 years. He left the club in the summer of 1999.

=== A.S.D. Castel di Sangro Calcio ===
He then transferred to A.S.D. Castel di Sangro Calcio, after his poor experience with Cervia. In his first season with the club, he got off to a good start, and would go on to make over 50 total appearances, scoring 9 goals. He left the club after just two seasons however, to re-sign for A.C. Cesena, the club he represented at a youth and senior level in the past.

=== Return to Cesena ===
In July 2001, Canfalone transferred back to A.C. Cesena, after a good experience with A.S.D. Castel di Sangro Calcio. He finally managed to make his way into the club's first team and would go on to be one of the key players in their bids to at a time be promoted to the Serie B, and also look to both avoid relegation and/or be promoted to the Italian Serie A. He remained with the club until August 2005. This was the longest and most successful spell for the player, with a single club. He appeared nearly 150 times, scoring over 20 goals.

=== AC Arezzo ===
After his four-season stint with Cesena, Confalone moved to Tuscany, with A.C. Arezzo in 2005. The club was at the time in the Serie B. In his single season with the Tuscan club, Confalone established himself as a starter for much of the season. he formed a solid midfield partnership with Mirko Conte, and managed 38 appearances in all competitions as well as 3 goals.

=== Spezia Calcio ===
In August 2006, Canfalone was sold to Spezia Calcio, another Serie B club, following Arezzo's Relegation to Serie C1, now known as the Lega Pro Prima Divisione. With the club, Confalone was also part of the starting eleven for much of the season, and most notably scored a goal against Juventus FC, in a 1–1 draw at the Stadio Alberto Picco, in Spezia. He appeared 30 times for the club over the course of the season, scoring 2 other goals along the way. Despite not finishing in the bottom 4 in Serie B, Spezia were relegated anyway, due to financial purposes and eventual bankruptcy. Hence, Confalone left the club.

=== Bologna FC 1909 ===
During the summer of 2007, Confalone moved to Bologna FC. At the time of his arrival, Bologna were in the Italian Serie B, however in his first season with the club, they achieved a second-place finish, leading to promotion to the Italian Serie A. Confalone helped contribute to their promotion with 19 total appearances and 1 goal. In his first ever season in Serie A, he was struck with injury for much of the campaign, only featuring 4 times throughout the season. His contract was not renewed and he was released on 30 June 2009.

=== Later career ===
On 4 November 2009, Confalone officially signed for Lega Pro Prima Divisione side, Ternana Calcio. He appeared 14 times with 6 of them coming as a part of the starting XI. Ternana just barely missed out on a return to Serie B that season, and Confalone eventually departed the club in order to return to his former club, Imolese. His stay at the club was very brief however, and he transferred to Associazione Calcio Asti after just 11 appearances and 1 goal for Imolese. His stay at Asti proved even shorter than his previous cameo, as he made just 6 appearances, scoring once for the Asti based club. He then transferred to amateur side Pelli SantaCroce before returning to the professional stage with S.P. La Fiorita in the Campionato Sammarinese di Calcio.
