= Tomas Danilevičius =

Lithuanian footballer (born 1978)

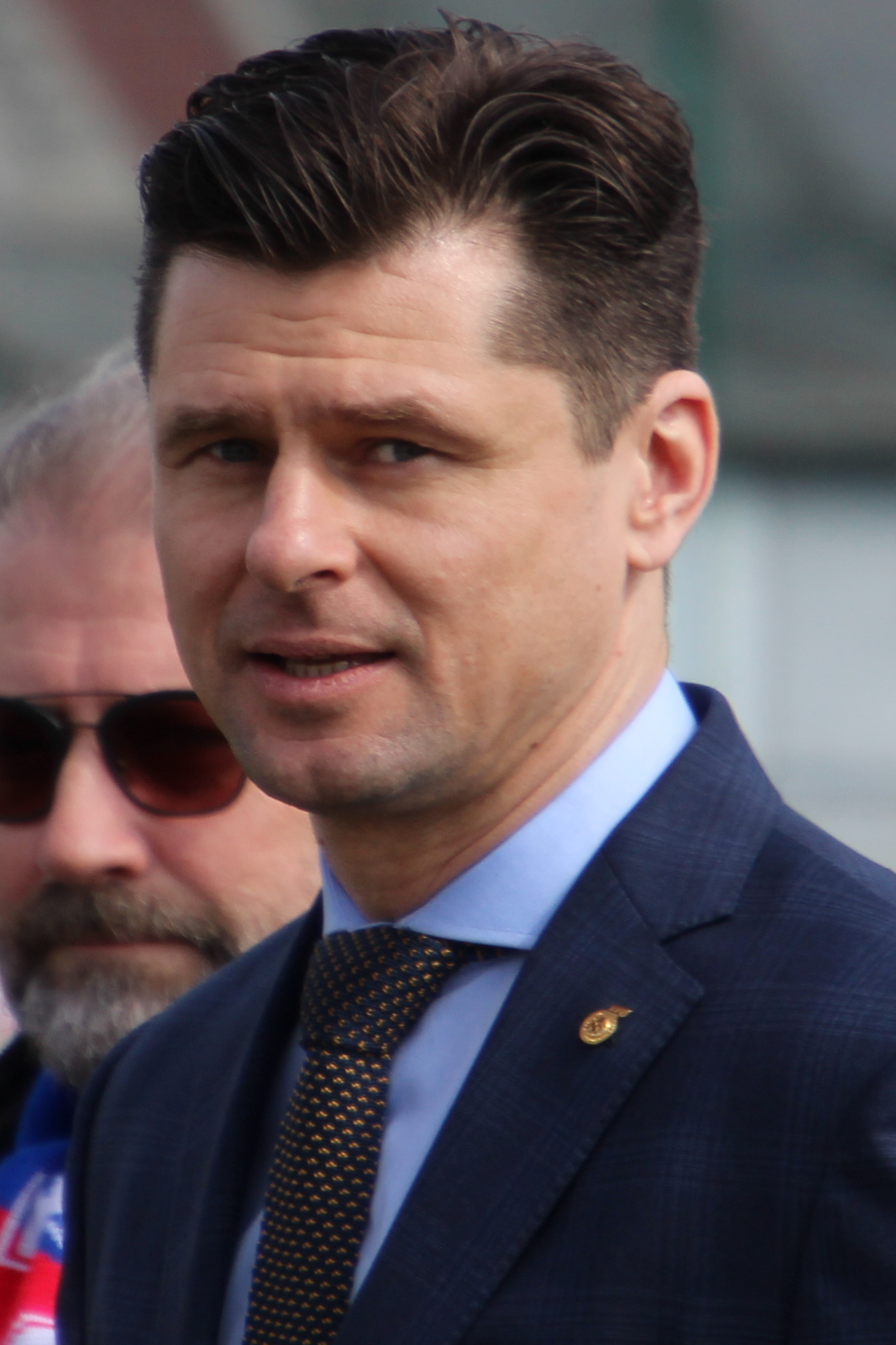
- Danilevičius in 2018

President of Lithuanian Football Federation
- In office 30 September 2017 – 10 March 2023
- Preceded by: Vidmantas Butkevičius
- Succeeded by: Edgaras Stankevičius

Personal details
- Born: Tomas Danilevičius; 18 July 1978 (age 48) Klaipėda, Lithuanian SSR, Soviet Union
- Height: 1.91 m (6 ft 3 in)
- Occupation: Footballer; Football administrator
Association football career
- Position: Striker
Senior career*
Years	Team	Apps	(Gls)
1995–1996	Atlantas	0	(0)
1996–1997	Club Brugge	7	(1)
1998–1999	Dynamo Moscow	13	(5)
2000	Club Brugge	0	(0)
2000	Lausanne	7	(4)
2000–2001	Arsenal	2	(0)
2001	→ Dunfermline Athletic (loan)	3	(0)
2001–2002	Beveren	29	(12)
2002–2006	Livorno	73	(10)
2005–2006	→ Avellino (loan)	38	(17)
2007	Bologna	20	(2)
2008	→ Grosseto (loan)	22	(9)
2008–2011	Livorno	75	(14)
2011–2013	Juve Stabia	49	(12)
2013	Latina	4	(1)
2013–2014	Parma	0	(0)
2013–2014	→ Gorica (loan)	11	(1)
Total		353	(88)
International career
1998–2012	Lithuania	71	(19)
- * Club domestic league appearances and goals

Tomas Danilevičius (born 18 July 1978) is a Lithuanian footballer and former president of the Lithuanian Football Federation.

== Club career ==
Danilevičius previously played for Livorno, Arsenal (playing twice in the league, in games against Sunderland and Charlton), FC Dynamo Moscow, K.S.K. Beveren, Dunfermline Athletic, Lausanne Sports and Club Brugge. Whilst at Arsenal he scored in a pre-season game against FC Barcelona.

He was signed by Bologna in January 2007 in a co-ownership deal for €2 million. After one year at Bologna he signed a six-month loan deal with Grosseto before returning to Livorno in June 2008 for a €400,000 transfer fee and on a four-year contract.

In 2011, Danilevičius was signed by S.S. Juve Stabia on a free transfer.

== International career ==
Danilevicius has been capped 72 times for the Lithuania national team. As of September 2009, he had scored 19 goals in 72 appearances for Lithuania, making him all-time leading scorer.

== Career statistics ==
=== Club ===
Appearances and goals by club, season and competition
Club	Season	League			Cup		Europe		Total	
Club	Season	Division	Apps	Goals	Apps	Goals	Apps	Goals	Apps	Goals
Arsenal	2000–01	Premier League	2	0	1	0	0	0	3	0
Beveren	2001–02	Jupiler Pro League	26	10	3	1	0	0	29	11
Livorno	2002–03	Serie B	21	1	0	0	0	0	21	1
Livorno	2003–04	Serie B	22	4	0	0	0	0	22	4
Livorno	2004–05	Serie B	17	2	2	1	0	0	19	3
Livorno	Total		60	7	2	1	0	0	62	8
Avellino (loan)	2005–06	Serie B	38	17	3	0	0	0	41	17
Livorno	2006–07	Serie A	13	3	2	0	5	1	20	4
Bologna (loan)	2006–07	Serie B	13	2	0	0	0	0	13	2
Bologna (loan)	2007–08	Serie B	7	0	0	0	0	0	7	0
Grosseto (loan)	2007–08	Serie B	22	9	0	0	0	0	22	9
Livorno	2008–09	Serie B	27	4	4	2	0	0	31	6
Livorno	2009–10	Serie A	26	5	3	1	0	0	29	6
Livorno	2010–11	Serie B	23	5	2	0	0	0	25	5
Livorno	Total		76	14	9	3	0	0	85	17
Juve Stabia	2011–12	Serie B	33	5	1	0	0	0	34	5
Juve Stabia	2012–13	Serie B	16	7	2	2	0	0	18	9
Juve Stabia	Total		49	12	3	2	0	0	52	14
Latina (loan)	2012–13	Lega Pro Prima Divisione	11	2	2	0	0	0	13	2
Gorica (loan)	2013–14	Slovenian PrvaLiga	11	1	3	2	0	0	14	3
Career total			328	77	28	9	5	1	361	87

=== International ===
Appearances and goals by national team and year
National team	Year	Apps	Goals
Lithuania	1998	1	0
Lithuania	1999	1	0
Lithuania	2000	5	0
Lithuania	2001	3	1
Lithuania	2002	2	0
Lithuania	2003	3	0
Lithuania	2004	6	2
Lithuania	2005	6	0
Lithuania	2006	6	5
Lithuania	2007	10	5
Lithuania	2008	9	4
Lithuania	2009	7	2
Lithuania	2010	5	0
Lithuania	2011	5	0
Lithuania	2012	2	0
Total		71	19

Scores and results list Lithuania's goal tally first, score column indicates score after each Danilevičius goal.

List of international goals scored by Tomas Danilevičius
No.	Date	Venue	Opponent	Score	Result	Competition	Ref.
1	26 February 2001	Tsirio Stadium, Limassol, Cyprus	Cyprus	1–1	2–1	Friendly	
2	18 August 2004	Central Dynamo Stadium, Moscow, Russia	Russia	1–1	3–4	Friendly	
3	8 September 2004	Darius and Girėnas Stadium, Kaunas, Lithuania	San Marino	3–0	4–0	2006 FIFA World Cup qualification	
4	1 March 2006	Arena Kombëtare, Tirana, Albania	Albania	2–1	2–1	Friendly	
5	16 August 2006	Zimbru Stadium, Chișinău, Moldova	Moldova	2–1	2–3	Friendly	
6	2 September 2006	Stadio San Paolo, Naples, Italy	Italy	1–0	1–1	UEFA Euro 2008 qualifying	
7	15 November 2006	Tony Bezzina Stadium, Paola, Malta	Malta	1–0	4–1	Friendly	
8	15 November 2006	Tony Bezzina Stadium, Paola, Malta	Malta	3–0	4–1	Friendly	
9	22 August 2007	Darius and Girėnas Stadium, Kaunas, Lithuania	Turkmenistan	1–0	2–1	Friendly	
10	22 August 2007	Darius and Girėnas Stadium, Kaunas, Lithuania	Turkmenistan	2–0	2–1	Friendly	
11	8 September 2007	Hampden Park, Glasgow, Scotland	Scotland	1–1	1–3	UEFA Euro 2008 qualifying	
12	12 September 2007	Darius and Girėnas Stadium, Kaunas, Lithuania	Faroe Islands	2–0	2–1	UEFA Euro 2008 qualifying	
13	17 November 2007	Darius and Girėnas Stadium, Kaunas, Lithuania	Ukraine	2–0	2–0	UEFA Euro 2008 qualifying	
14	20 August 2008	Sūduva Stadium, Marijampolė, Lithuania	Moldova	3–0	3–0	Friendly	
15	10 September 2008	Sūduva Stadium, Marijampolė, Lithuania	Austria	1–0	2–0	2010 FIFA World Cup qualification	
16	10 September 2008	Sūduva Stadium, Marijampolė, Lithuania	Austria	2–0	2–0	2010 FIFA World Cup qualification	
17	15 October 2008	Darius and Girėnas Stadium, Kaunas, Lithuania	Faroe Islands	1–0	1–0	2010 FIFA World Cup qualification	
18	12 August 2009	Stade Josy Barthel, Luxembourg City, Luxembourg	Luxembourg	1–0	1–0	Friendly	
19	9 September 2009	Svangaskarð, Toftir, Faroe Islands	Faroe Islands	1–1	1–2	2010 FIFA World Cup qualification	

== See also ==
- List of top international men's football goalscorers by country
