= Mantas Savėnas =

Lithuanian footballer and coach

Personal information
- Date of birth: 27 August 1982 (age 44)
- Place of birth: Lithuanian SSR, Soviet Union
- Height: 1.77 m (5 ft 9 1/2 in)
- Position: Midfielder

Senior career*
Years	Team	Apps	(Gls)
1998–2007	FK Ekranas	245	(94)
2008–2009	FC Nosta Novotroitsk	45	(9)
2009–2010	FC Sibir Novosibirsk	14	(0)
2011	FC Gazovik Orenburg	9	(1)
2011–2012	FK Ekranas	19	(9)
2012	FC Sunkar	12	(2)
2013–2014	FK Daugava Rīga	54	(22)
2015	FK Panevėžys	0	(0)

International career
2003–2011	Lithuania	38	(5)
- * Club domestic league appearances and goals

Mantas Savėnas (born 27 August 1982) is a former Lithuanian professional footballer who played as a midfielder. He is currently a coach for FK Panevėžys.

Savėnas represented Lithuania at under-21 level before establishing himself as a regular player in the Lithuania national team.

In the 2005 season Savėnas became Lithuanian A Lyga top scorer with 27 goals and was voted best player in Lithuania, receiving 177 from 200 votes. Following the 2013 season Savenas was voted as the Daugava Rīga best player of the season. In 2014, he was the club's top scorer with 10 goals in 30 appearances.

== International goals ==
#	Date	Venue	Opponent	Score	Result	Competition
1.	1 March 2006	Tirana	Albania	1–1	2–1	Friendly
2.	17 November 2007	Kaunas	Ukraine	1–0	2–0	EURO 2008 qualifying
3.	4 June 2008	Burghausen	Russia	1–0	1–4	Friendly
4.	19 November 2008	Tallinn	Moldova	1–1	1–1	Friendly
