= Stefano =

- Pronunciation: Italian: [ˈsteːfano]
- Gender: Male
- Language: Italian
- Name day: December 26

Origin
- Region of origin: Italy

Other names
- Related names: Stephen, Di Stefano

Stefano is the Italian form of the masculine given name Στέφανος (Stefanos, Stephen). The name is of Greek origin, Στέφανος, meaning a person who made a significant achievement and has been crowned. In Orthodox Christianity the achievement is in the realm of virtues, αρετές, therefore the name signifies a person who had triumphed over passions and gained the relevant virtues. In Italian, the stress falls usually on the first syllable, [ˈsteːfano] (an exception is the Apulian surname Stefano, [steˈfaːno]); in English, it is often mistakenly placed on the second, /stəˈfɑːnoʊ/.

== People with the given name Stefano ==
- Stefano (wrestler), ring name of Daniel Garcia Soto
- Stefano Abbati (born 1955), Italian actor
- Stefano Accorsi (born 1971), Italian actor
- Stefano Agostini (cardinal) (1614–1683), Italian cardinal
- Stefano Agostini (cyclist) (born 1989), Italian cyclist
- Stefano Albertoni (born 1966), Swiss-Italian football midfielder
- Stefano Alfonso (born 1968), speedway rider
- Stefano Allocchio (born 1962), Italian racing cyclist
- Stefano Amadei (1580–1644), Italian painter of the early Baroque period
- Stefano Amadio (born 1989), Italian footballer
- Stefano Anceschi (born 1984), Italian sprinter
- Stefano Angeleri (1926–2012), Italian footballer and coach
- Stefano Angioni (born 1939), Italian equestrian
- Stefano Antezza (born 1996), Italian football player
- Stefano Anzi (born 1949), Italian alpine skier
- Stefano Arcieri (born 1998), Italian handball player
- Stefano Arduini (born 1956), scholar of linguistics
- Stefano Argilli (born 1973), Italian footballer
- Stefano Arienti (born 1961), Italian artist
- Stefano Arteaga (1747–1799), Spanish-born writer on theater and music
- Stefano Avogadri (born 1985), Italian footballer
- Stefano Badoer, Venetian nobleman
- Stefano Bakonyi (1892–1969), Hungarian writer and pioneering engineer
- Stefano Balassone (born 1943), Italian television producer and writer
- Stefano Baldini (born 1971), Italian runner
- Stefano Ballarini (1902–1979), Hungarian-born American baritone
- Stefano Ballo (born 1993), Italian swimmer
- Stefano Baraldo (born 1992), Italian footballer
- Stefano Barba (born 1964), Italian rugby union player and coach
- Stefano Barberi (born 1984), Brazilian/American mountain bike and gravel racer
- Stefano Bardini (1836–1922), Italian connoisseur and art dealer
- Stefano Bargauan, Italian figure skater
- Stefano Barrera (born 1980), Italian foil fencer
- Stefano Basalini (born 1977), Italian rower
- Stefano Battaglia (born 1965), Italian classical and jazz pianist
- Stefano Battistelli (born 1970), Italian backstroke and medley swimmer
- Stefano Baudino (born 1963), Italian cyclist
- Stefano Belisari (born 1961), nicknamed Elio, Italian singer and actor
- Stefano Bellentani, Italian consultant gastroenterologist, hepatologist, and academic
- Stefano Bellone (born 1955), Italian fencer
- Stefano Belotti (born 2004), Italian diver
- Stefano Beltrame (born 1993), Italian footballer
- Stefano Bemer (1964–2012), Italian shoemaker
- Stefano Benni (1947–2025), Italian satirical writer, poet, and journalist
- Stefano Bensi (born 1988), Luxembourgish international footballer
- Stefano Bernardi (1580–1637), Italian priest, composer and music theorist
- Stefano Bertacco (1962–2020), Italian politician
- Stefano Bessoni (born 1965), Italian filmmaker, stop-motion animator, and illustrator
- Stefano Bettarello (born 1958), Italian rugby union player
- Stefano Bettarini (born 1972), Italian footballer and TV personality
- Stefano Bianca, Swiss architectural historian and urban designer
- Stefano Bianchi, Italian astrophysicist
- Stefano Bianchini (born 1970), Italian mathematician
- Stefano Bianco (1985–2020), Italian motorcycle racer
- Stefano Bianconi (born 1968), Italian footballer
- Stefano Bigliardi, specialist on the Islam and science discourse
- Stefano Bloch (born 1976), American author and professor
- Stefano Boccaletti (born 1966), Italian physicist
- Stefano Boeri (born 1956), Italian architect and urban planner
- Stefano Bollani (born 1972), Italian musician and television presenter
- Stefano Bonaccini (born 1967), Italian politician and regional president
- Stefano Bonfiglio (born 1964), Italian businessman
- Stefano Bono (born 1979), Italian football player
- Stefano Bonomo (born 1993), American soccer player
- Stefano Bonsignori, several people
- Stefano Borchi (born 1987), Italian racing cyclist
- Stefano Bordon (born 1968), Italian rugby union player and a current coach
- Stefano Borgia (1731–1804), Italian Cardinal, theologian, antiquarian, and historian
- Stefano Borgonovo (1964–2013), Italian footballer and manager
- Stefano Bortolussi, writer, poet, and translator of Italian
- Stefano Bosi, Italian table tennis player
- Stefano Botta (born 1986), Italian football midfielder
- Stefano Brancaccio (1618–1682), Roman Catholic cardinal
- Stefano Braschi (born 1957), Italian football referee
- Stefano Brecciaroli (born 1974), Italian Olympic eventing rider
- Stefano Brundo (born 1993), Argentine footballer
- Stefano Bruzzi (1835–1911), Italian painter
- Stefano Buono (born 1966), Italian physicist
- Stefano Buttiero (born 1966), Italian racing car driver
- Stefano Cagol (born 1969), Italian artist
- Stefano Caille (born 2000), French footballer
- Stefano Callegari, several people
- Stefano Camogli, Baroque painter
- Stefano Cason (born 1995), Italian football player
- Stefano Capani, Roman Catholic prelate who served as Bishop of Lavello
- Stefano Carobbi (born 1964), Italian association football manager and player
- Stefano Carozzo (born 1979), Italian fencer
- Stefano Caruso (born 1987), German/Italian competitive ice dancer
- Stefano Casagranda (born 1973), Italian racing cyclist
- Stefano Casale (born 1971), Italian footballer
- Stefano Casali (born 1962), Sammarinese racewalker
- Stefano Casarotto (born 1996), Italian footballer
- Stefano Caselli (born 1969), Italian economist and professor of banking and finance
- Stefano Casertano, Italian film director and producer
- Stefano Casiraghi (1960–1990), Italian socialite
- Stefano Cassiani (1636–1714), Italian painter
- Stefano Castellani (born 1992), Italian footballer
- Stefano Catenacci (born 1966), Swedish chef
- Stefano Cattai (born 1967), Italian cyclist
- Stefano Cavazzoni (1881–1951), Italian politician
- Stefano Ceccaroni (born 1961), Swiss-Italian footballer and manager
- Stefano Cecchi (born 1971), record producer and entrepreneur
- Stefano Celesti, Italian painter
- Stefano Celozzi (born 1988), German footballer
- Stefano Ceri (born 1955), Italian computer engineer and professor of database management
- Stefano Cerio, Italian photographer and video artist
- Stefano Cerioni (born 1964), Italian foil fencer
- Stefano Černetić (born 1960), Italian royal pretender
- Stefano Cernotto, Italian painter of Croatian origin
- Stefano Checchin (born 1967), Italian road cyclist
- Stefano Cherchi (2001–2024), Italian jockey
- Stefano Chiesa (born 1996), Italian athlete
- Stefano Chimini (born 1993), Italian footballer
- Stefano Chiodaroli (born 1964), Italian actor and stand-up comedian
- Stefano Chiodi (1956–2009), Italian footballer
- Stefano Cianciotta, professor of communication and media management of corporate crisis
- Stefano Cilio (born 1980), Italian musician, writer, radio personality and journalist
- Stefano Cincotta (born 1991), Guatemalan footballer
- Stefano Cipressi (born 1982), Italian slalom canoeist
- Stefano Civeriati (born 1966), Italian football coach and player
- Stefano Cobolli (born 1977), Italian tennis player
- Stefano Colagè (born 1962), Italian road cyclist
- Stefano Colantuono (born 1962), Italian football football manager and player
- Stefano Coletti (born 1989), Monégasque racing driver
- Stefano Comini (born 1990), Swiss racing driver
- Stefano Conti, Italian 18th century merchant
- Stefano Coppa, Italian engraver
- Stefano Cortinovis (born 1968), Italian racing cyclist
- Stefano Costantini (born 1983), Italian amateur racing driver
- Stefano Cristiani (born 1958), Italian astronomer and astrophysicist
- Stefano Cugurra (born 1974), Brazilian football coach
- Stefano Cuoghi (born 1959), Italian association football coach and player
- Stefano Cupilli, Roman Catholic prelate
- Stefano Cusin (born 1968), Canadian soccer coach and player
- Stefano D'Amico (born 1996) is an Italian composer
- Stefano d'Antonio di Vanni, Italian painter
- Stefano D'Arrigo (1919–1992), Italian writer
- Stefano D'Aste (born 1974), Italian auto racing driver
- Stefano da Bagnone (1418–1478), Italian presbyter
- Stefano Da Frè, Italian-Canadian director, producer, and actor
- Stefano da San Gregorio, Italian mathematician and theologian
- Stefano da Verona, Italian painter
- Stefano Dacastello (born 1980), Italian long jumper and sprinter
- Stefano Dall'Acqua (born 1981), Italian footballer
- Stefano Dall' Arzere, Italian painter
- Stefano David, Roman Catholic prelate
- Stefano De Angelis (born 1974), Italian football manager and a player
- Stéfano de Gregorio (born 1994), Argentine actor and model
- Stefano De Luigi (born 1964), German-born Italian photographer
- Stefano De Marchi (born 1962), Italian mathematician
- Stefano De Martino (born 1989), Italian television presenter and dancer
- Stefano De Sando (born 1954), Italian actor and voice actor
- Stefano Del Sante (born 1987), Italian footballer
- Stefano DellaVigna (born 1973), Italian economist
- Stefano della Bella (1610–1664), Italian draughtsman and printmaker
- Stefano Della Santa (born 1967), Italian road bicycle racer
- Stefano Delle Chiaje (1794–1860), Italian zoologist, botanist, anatomist, and physician
- Stefano Denswil (born 1993), footballer
- Stefano Desideri (born 1965), Italian football coach and a player
- Stefano Desimoni (born 1988), Italian baseball outfielder
- Stefano Di Battista (born 1969), Italian jazz musician
- Stefano Di Benedetto, known as Stefano da Ferrara, Italian painter
- Stefano Di Berardino (born 1987), Italian footballer
- Stefano Di Chiara (born 1957), Italian footballer and manager
- Stefano Di Cola (born 1998), Italian swimmer
- Stefano Di Fiordo (born 1980), Italian footballer
- Stefano Di Marino (1961–2021), Italian author of pulp fiction
- Stefano Dicuonzo (born 1985), Italian football defender
- Stefano Dionisi (born 1966), Italian actor
- Stefano Domenicali (born 1965), Italian motorsport executive
- Stefano Donagrandi (born 1976), ice speed skater from Italy
- Stefano Donati (born 1982), Italian sports journalist and TV presenter
- Stefano Donaudy (1879–1925), Italian composer
- Stefano Durazzo (1594–1667), Italian Catholic cardinal and archbishop of Genoa
- Stefano Eranio (born 1966), Italian footballer
- Stefano Erardi (1630–1716), Maltese painter
- Stefano Fabri, Italian composer and organist
- Stefano Falzagalloni, Italian painter
- Stefano Fanelli (born 1969), Luxembourgish football striker
- Stefano Fantoni (born 1945), Italian theoretical physicist
- Stefano Fanucci (born 1979), Italian footballer
- Stefano Farina (1962–2017), Italian association football referee
- Stefano Fattori (born 1972), Italian footballer
- Stefano Faustini (born 1968), Italian cyclist
- Stefano Felis, Neapolitan Italian composer of the Renaissance
- Stefano Ferrari, Italian football player
- Stefano Ferrario (born 1985), Italian footballer
- Stefano Ferronato (born 1968), Italian curler
- Stefano Fieschi, 15th-century Italian scholar, episcopal secretary, and pedagogue
- Stefano Fiore (born 1975), Italian football manager and player
- Stefano Fiorentino (1301–1350), Italian painter
- Stefano Onorato Ferretti (1640–1720), the 138th Doge of the Republic of Genoa and king of Corsica
- Stefano Folchetti, Italian painter active in the Quattrocento period
- Stefano Fortunato (born 1990), Italian footballer
- Stefano Fraquelli (born 1972), Italian lightweight rower
- Stefano Fresi (born 1974), Italian actor, composer, and singer
- Stefano Fusari (born 1983), Italian footballer
- Stefano Gabbana (born 1962), Italian fashion designer
- Stefano Gabellini (born 1965), Italian racing driver
- Stefano Gai (born 1985), Italian racing driver
- Stefano Galli, electrical engineer
- Stefano Gallini-Durante, Italian-born film producer based in the U.S.
- Stefano Gallio, Italian football player
- Stefano Galvani (born 1977), tennis player from San Marino
- Stefano Gandin (born 1996), Italian racing cyclist
- Stefano Garris (born 1979), German basketball player
- Stefano Garzelli (born 1973), Italian road racing cyclist
- Stefano Garzon (born 1981), Italian football player
- Stefano Gattuso (born 1984), Italian racing driver
- Stefano Gaudenzi (born 1941), tennis player
- Stefano Gentile (born 1989), Italian basketball player
- Stefano Gervasoni (born 1962) Italian composer
- Stefano Gherardini (1695–1755), Italian painter
- Stefano Ghirardelli (1633–1708), Roman Catholic prelate who served as Bishop of Alatri
- Stefano Ghisolfi (born 1993), Italian rock climber
- Stefano Giacomelli (born 1990), Italian footballer
- Stefano Giannotti (born 1963), Italian musician and composer
- Stefano Giantorno (born 1991), Brazilian rugby sevens player
- Stefano Giavazzi (born 1963), Italian pianist
- Stefano Giliati (born 1987), Canadian-born Italian ice hockey left wing
- Stefano Gioacchini (born 1976), Italian footballer
- Stefano Giraldi (born 1968), Italian road cyclist
- Stefano Girelli (born 2001), Italian footballer
- Stefano Giuliani (born 1958), Italian cyclist
- Stefano Gobatti (1852–1913), Italian opera composer
- Stefano Gobbi (1930–2011), Italian Roman Catholic priest
- Stefano Golinelli (1818–1891), Italian piano virtuoso and composer
- Stefano Gori (born 1996), Italian footballer
- Stefano Grandi (born 1962), Italian freestyle swimmer
- Stefano Grazzini (born 1952), Italian male long-distance runner
- Stefano Greco (born 1999), Italian football player
- Stefano Grondona (born in 1958), Italian classical guitarist
- Stefano Gross (born 1986), World Cup alpine ski racer from northern Italy
- Stefano Gualeni (born 1978), Italian philosopher & game-designer
- Stefano Guazzo (1530–1593), Italian writer
- Stefano Guberti (born 1984), Italian footballer
- Stefano Guidoni (born 1971), Italian footballer
- Stefano Guidotti (born 1999), Swiss footballer
- Stefano Hunt (born 1991), Australian rugby union player
- Stefano Ianni (born 1981), Italian tennis player
- Stefano Impallomeni (born 1967), Italian footballer
- Stefano Incerti (born 1965), Italian film director
- Stefano Infessura, Italian humanist historian and lawyer
- Stefano Ittar (1724–1790), Polish-Italian architect
- Stefano Kaoze, Congolese Catholic priest
- Stefano Knuchel, Swiss documentary film director, screenwriter, and producer
- Stefano Kunchev (born 1991), Bulgarian footballer
- Stefano La Colla, Italian tenor
- Stefano La Rosa (born 1985), Italian long-distance runner
- Stefano Lambri, Italian painter
- Stefano Landi, Italian composer and teacher of the early Baroque Roman School
- Stefano Langone (born 1989), American singer and musician
- Stefano Lanini (born 1994), Italian football player
- Stefano Lari (born 1961), Italian rower
- Stefano Layeni (born 1982), Italian footballer
- Stefano Maria Legnani (1661–1713), Italian painter
- Stefano Lemmi, Italian painter
- Stefano Lentini (born 1974), Italian composer
- Stefano Levialdi Ghiron (1936–2015), Italian computer scientist
- Stefano Lilipaly (born 1990), Dutch-Indonesian footballer
- Stefano Lippi (born 1981), Paralympic athlete from Italy
- Stefano Locatelli (born 1989), Italian racing cyclist
- Stefano Lodovichi (born 1983), Italian film director and screenwriter
- Stefano Lombardi (born 1976), Italian footballer
- Stefano Lomellini (1683–1753), the 161st Doge of the Republic of Genoa
- Stefano Lonardi, Italian computer scientist and bioinformatician
- Stefano Lorenzi (born 1977), Italian football coach and player
- Stefano Lorenzini, Italian physician and noted ichthyologist
- Stefano Luongo (born 1990), Italian water polo player
- Stefano Lucchini (born 1980), Italian football coach and player
- Stefano Lusignan (1537–1590), writer and Catholic priest
- Stefano Macaluso (born 1975), Italian businessman
- Stefano Maccoppi (born 1962), Italian football manager and player
- Stefano Maderno, Roman sculptor
- Stefano Madia (1954–2004), Italian film actor
- Stefano Magaddino, American mafia boss in the Buffalo crime family
- Stefano Magnasco (born 1992), Chilean footballer
- Stefano Magno, Venetian chronicler
- Stefano Maier (born 1992), German footballer
- Stefano Mainetti, Italian composer and conductor
- Stefano Maiorano (born 1986), Italian football midfielder
- Stefano Malinverni (1959–2024), Italian sprinter
- Stefano Mammarella (born 1984), Italian futsal player
- Stefano Mancinelli (born 1983), Italian basketball player
- Stefano Mancuso (born 1965), Italian botanist and writer
- Stefano Mandini, Italian operatic baritone
- Stefano Manetti (born 1959), Italian Catholic bishop
- Stefano Manfredi (born 1954), Italian-born chef and author
- Stefano Manzi (born 1999), Italian motorcycle racer
- Stefano Marchand (1755–1793), French merchant
- Stefano Marchetti, several people
- Stefano Marcia (born 1993), South African sailor
- Stefano Margoni (born 1975), Italian ice hockey player
- Stefano Margotti (1900–1981), Italian sports shooter
- Stefano Marino (born 2004), German footballer
- Stefano Martinoli (born 1935), Italian rower
- Stefano Marzano (born 1950), Italian architect and designer
- Stefano Marzo (born 1991), Belgian footballer
- Stefano Massini (born 1975), Italian writer, essayist, and playwright
- Stefano Mauri (born 1980), Italian footballer
- Stefano Mautone (born 1970), Australian association football coach
- Stefano Mazzini (born 1998), Italian footballer
- Stefano Mazzocco (born 1980), Italian football player
- Stefano Mazzoli (born 1996), Italian golfer
- Stefano Mazzonis di Pralafera (1948–2021), Italian opera director
- Stefano Mei (born 1963), Italian long-distance runner
- Stefano Giuseppe Menatti, Roman Catholic prelate who served as Bishop of Como
- Stefano Mengozzi (born 1985), Italian male volleyball player
- Stefano Meroni (born 1982), Italian para-cyclist
- Stefano Mezzadri (born 1967), Swiss tennis player
- Stefano Miceli (born 1975), Italian classical conductor and pianist
- Stefano Miele (born 1974), Italian DJ also known as Riva Starr
- Stefano Minelli (born 1994), Italian footballer
- Stefano Missio (born 1972), Italian filmmaker
- Stefano Mitchell (born 1999), Antigua and Barbuda swimmer
- Stefano Modena (born 1963), Italian F1 driver
- Stefano Molinari (born 2000), Italian footballer
- Stefano Montaldo (born 1969), Italian mathematician
- Stefano Mordini (born 1968), Italian film director and screenwriter
- Stefano Moreo (born 1993), Italian footballer
- Stefano Moretti, musician and singer
- Stefano Moreyra (born 2001), Argentine footballer
- Stefano Mori (born 1985), Filipino-Italian actor and singer
- Stefano Moro (born 1997), Italian cyclist
- Stefano Morona (born 1957), Italian curler
- Stefano Morrone (born 1978), Italian football player and coach
- Stefano Moscatelli, Roman Catholic prelate who served as Bishop of Nusco
- Stefano Musco, Grand Prix motorcycle racer from Italy
- Stefano Napoleoni (born 1986), Italian footballer
- Stefano Napolitano (born 1995), Italian tennis player
- Stefano Nardelli (born 1993), Italian cyclist
- Stefano Nardini, Italian Roman Catholic bishop and cardinal
- Stefano Natale (1903–1970), Italian long-distance runner
- Stefano Nava (born 1969), Italian football manager and footballer
- Stefano Negro (born 1995), Italian football player
- Stefano Nepa (born 2001), Italian Grand Prix motorcycle racer
- Stefano Noferini (born 1961), Italian tech and tech house DJ and producer
- Stefano Nolfi (born 1963), Italian scientist
- István Nyers (1924–2005), also known as Stefano Nyers, Hungarian footballer
- Stefano Okaka (born 1989), Italian footballer
- Stefano Oldani (born 1998), Italian cyclist
- Stefano Olivato, Italian bass and chromatic harmonica player
- Stefano Olivieri (born 1983), Italian footballer
- Stefano Oppo (born 1994), Italian rower
- Stefano Orlandi (1681–1760), Italian painter
- Stefano Pace (1695–1735), Maltese mediaeval philosopher
- Stefano Padovan (born 1994), Italian footballer
- Stefano Palatchi (born 1960), Spanish opera singer
- Stefano Benedetto Pallavicino (1672–1742), Italian poet and opera librettist
- Stefano Pantano (born 1962), Italian fencer
- Stefano Pardini (born 1975), Italian football coach and goalkeeper
- Stefano Pasquini, Italian contemporary artist, writer, and curator
- Stefano Pastrello (born 1984), Italian footballer
- Stefano Patriarca (born 1987), Italian volleyball player
- Stefano Patrizi (1715–1797), Italian jurist and scholar
- Stefano Pavesi (1779–1850), Italian composer
- Stefano Pecci (born 1979), Italian modern pentathlete
- Stefano Pelinga (born 1964), Italian pool (pocket billiards) player
- Stefano Pellegrini, several people
- Stefano Pellini (born 1997), Italian footballer
- Stefano Pellizzari (born 1997), Italian footballer
- Stefano Perugini (born 1974), Grand Prix motorcycle road racer from Italy
- Stefano Pesce (born 1967), Italian actor and author
- Stefano Peschiera (born 1995), Peruvian competitive sailor
- Stefano Pescosolido (born 1971), tennis player from Italy
- Stefano Pesoli (born 1984), Italian footballer
- Stefano Pesori, Italian Baroque guitarist, composer, and teacher
- Stefano Pessina (born 1941), Italian-Monegasque billionaire businessman
- Stefano Petitti (born 1953), Italian judge
- Stefano Pettinari (born 1992), Italian footballer
- Stefano Piccinini (born 2002), Italian footballer
- Stefano Pieri (1544–1629), Florentine painter
- Stefano Pietribiasi (born 1985), Italian footballer
- Stefano Pignatelli (1578–1623), Italian cardinal
- Stefano Pilati (born 1965), Italian fashion designer
- Stefano Pinho (born 1991), Brazilian footballer
- Stefano Pioli (born 1965), Italian football manager
- Stefano Pirandello (1895–1972), Italian playwright and writer
- Stefano Pirazzi (born 1987), Italian road bicycle racer
- Stefano Pittaluga (1887–1932), Italian film producer
- Stefano Pluchino (born 1971), Professor of Regenerative Neuroimmunology
- Stefano Podestà (born 1939), Italian academic and politician
- Stefano Pondaco (born 1989), Italian football player
- Stefano Postiglione (born 1960), Italian water polo player
- Stefano Pozza (born 1987), Italian football defender
- Stefano Pozzi (1699–1768), Italian painter, designer, draughtsman, and decorator
- Stefano Pozzolini (born 1977), Italian snowboarder
- Stefano Prizio (born 1988), Italian footballer
- Stefano Procida (born 1990), Italian footballer
- Stefano Proetto (born 1985), Italian racing driver
- Stefano Profumo (born 1978), Theoretical Physicist
- Stefano Protonotaro da Messina, poet of the Sicilian School
- Stefano Provenzali, Italian painter
- Stefano Quaranta, Roman Catholic prelate who served as Archbishop of Amalfi
- Stefano Quintarelli (born 1965), Italian information technology specialist
- Stefano Raffaele (born 1970), Italian comics book artist
- Stefano Raimondi (born 1998), Italian Paralympic swimmer
- Stefano Raise (1932–2008), Italian footballer
- Stefano Ranucci (born 1963), Italian manager and university president
- Stefano Rapone (born 1986), Italian comedian and writer
- Stefano Razzetti (born 1971), Italian football goalkeeper and trainer
- Stefano Andrea Renier (1759–1830), Italian naturalist and zoologist
- Stefano Ricci (sculptor) (1765–1837), Italian sculptor
- Stefano Righi (born 1960), Italian singer, songwriter, musician, record producer, and actor
- Stefano Rijssel (born 1992), Surinamese footballer
- Stefano Romagnoli (born 1955), Italian rugby union player and current coach
- Stefano Ronchetti-Monteviti (1814–1882), Italian composer, music educator, and college administrator
- Stefano Rosselli del Turco (1877–1947), Italian chess player
- Stefano Rossetto, Italian composer
- Stefano Rosso (1948–2008), Italian singer-songwriter and guitarist
- Stefano Rossini (born 1971), Italian football manager and player
- Stefano Rossini (footballer, born 1991) (born 1991), Italian footballer
- Stefano Rosso (1948–2008), Italian singer-songwriter and guitarist
- Stefano Rosso (businessman) (born 1979), Italian businessman
- Stefano Rossoni (born 1997), Italian footballer
- Stefano Rubbi (born 2002), Italian footballer
- Stefano Ruffini (1963–2006), Italian singer and voice actor
- Stefano Rulli (born 1949), Italian screenwriter
- Stefano Rusconi (born 1968), Italian basketball player
- Stefano Russo, several people
- Stefano Sabelli (born 1993), Italian footballer
- Stefano Sacchetti (born 1972), Italian football defender
- Stefano Sacripanti (born 1970), Italian basketball coach
- Stefano Salterio (1730–1806), Italian sculptor
- Stefano Salvatori (1967–2017), Italian footballer
- Stefano Salvi (born 1987), Italian footballer
- Stefano Sandrone (born 1988), Italian neuroscientist and educationalist
- Stefano Satta Flores (1937–1985), Italian actor and voice actor
- Stefano Sauli, Roman Catholic prelate who served as Archbishop of Chieti
- Stefano Saviozzi (born 1975), Italian rugby union player and current coach
- Stefano Scaini (born 1983), Italian long-distance runner
- Stefano Scappini (born 1988), Italian footballer
- Stefano Scarampella (1843–1925), Italian violin and cello maker
- Stefano Scodanibbio (1956–2012), Italian musician
- Stefano Scognamillo (born 1994), Italian football player of Russian origin
- Stefano Sculco (1638–1703), Roman Catholic prelate who served as Bishop of Gerace
- Stefano Secco (born 1973), Italian opera singer
- Stefano Seedorf (born 1982), Dutch footballer
- Stefano Selva (born 1969), Sammarinese sport shooter
- Stefano Sensi (born 1995), Italian footballer
- Stefano Serchinic (1929–2010), Yugoslav-born Italian male racewalker
- Stefano Sibaldi (1905–1996), Italian actor and voice actor
- Stefano Sibani (born 1951), Italian volleyball player
- Stefano Siglienti (1898–1971), Italian banker and politician
- Stefano Simoncelli (1946–2013), Italian fencer
- Stephan Sinding (1846–1922), Norwegian-Danish sculptor
- Stefano Siragusa (born 1976), Italian executive
- Stefano Soatto, professor of computer science
- Stefano Sollima (born 1966), Italian director and screenwriter
- Stefano Sommariva (1918–2007), Italian cross-country skier
- Stefano Sorrentino (born 1979), Italian footballer
- Stefano Sottile (born 1998), Italian high jumper
- Stefano Sposetti (born 1958), Swiss amateur astronomer
- Stefano Spremberg (born 1965), Italian lightweight rower
- Stefano Stramigioli, scientist and engineer
- Stefano Ludovico Straneo (1902–1997), Italian entomologist
- Stefano Sturaro (born 1993), Italian footballer
- Stefano Surdanovic (born 1998), Austrian footballer
- Stefano Tacconi (born 1957), Italian football goalkeeper
- Stefano Tamburini (1955–1986), Italian graphic artist, comics author, and magazine publisher
- Stefano Tarallo (born 1976), tennis player from Italy
- Stefano Tarolli (born 1997), Italian footballer
- Stefano Tatai (1938–2017), Italian chess master
- Stefano Taverna, Roman Catholic prelate who served as Bishop of Parma
- Stefano Tempesti (born 1979), Italian water polo goalkeeper
- Stefano Ticci (born 1962), Italian bobsledder
- Stefano Ticozzi (1762–1836), Italian art historian
- Stefano Tilli (born 1962), Italian sprinter
- Stefano Tofanelli (1752–1812), Italian painter
- Stefano Tomasini (born 1963), Italian cyclist
- Stefano Tonut (born 1993), Italian basketball player
- Stefano Torelli (1712–1784), Italian painter
- Stefano Torrisi (born 1971), Italian footballer
- Stefano Travaglia (born 1991), Italian tennis player
- Stefano Travisani (born 1985), Italian Paralympic archer
- Stefano Tremigliozzi (born 1985), Italian long jumper
- Stefano Trespidi (born 1970), Italian opera stage director
- Stefano Turati (born 2001), Italian footballer
- Stefano Usodimare, Master of the Order of Preachers from 1553 to 1557
- Stefano Ussi (1822–1901), Italian painter
- Stefano Utoikamanu (born 2000), rugby league footballer
- Stefano Vagnini (born 1963), Italian musician
- Stefano Valli (born 1969), Sammarinese racing driver
- Stefano Valore di Villanueva de Castellòn, Italian entrepreneur
- Stefano Valtulini (born 1996), Italian motorcycle racer
- Stefano Vanzina (1917–1988), known as Steno, Italian film director, screenwriter, and cinematographer
- Stefano Vavoli (born 1960), Italian footballer
- Stefano Vecchi (born 1971), Italian footballer turned coach
- Stefano Vecchia (born 1995), Swedish footballer
- Stefano Veltroni, Italian painter
- Stefano Veneziano, Italian painter
- Stefano Venturelli (born 1967), Italian judoka
- Stefano Venturi del Nibbio, Italian composer
- Stefano Viezzi (born 2006), Italian cyclist
- Stefano Visconti, member of the House of Visconti
- Stefano Vitale (born 1951), Italian physicist
- Stefano Volpi, Italian painter
- Stefano Vukov (born 1987), Croatian tennis coach
- Stéfano Yuri (born 1994), Brazilian footballer
- Stefano Zacchetti (1968–2020), Italian academic specialising in Buddhist studies
- Stefano Zacchiroli (born 1979), Italian and French academic and computer scientist
- Stefano Zamagni (born 1943), Italian economist
- Stefano Zanatta (born 1964), Italian racing cyclist
- Stefano Zanini (born 1969), Italian road racing cyclist
- Stefano Zoff (born 1966), Italian lightweight boxer

=== Middle name ===
- Antonio Stefano Benni (1880–1945), Italian entrepreneur and politician

=== Fictional characters ===
- Stefano DiMera, the main villain in Days of Our Lives
- Stefano, the Italian sea lion in the 2012 comedy film Madagascar 3: Europe's Most Wanted
- Stefano Valentini, major antagonist in The Evil Within 2

== People with the surname Stefano ==
- Dario Stefano (born 1963), Italian politician
- Ippazio Stefano (born 1945), Italian politician
- Joey Stefano, stage name of American pornographic actor (a.k.a. Tony Stefano, 1968–1994), Nicholas Iacona Jr.
- Joseph Stefano (1922–2006), American screenwriter

== See also ==
- San Stefano
- Santo Stefano (disambiguation)
- Stephan (given name)
- Stephano (disambiguation)
- Stephen
- Stefanoni
- Distefano
- Di Stefano
