= Caille =

Caille, the French for quail (plural: Cailles), may refer to:

== People ==
- Honoré Caille du Fourny (1630–1713), French genealogist
- Juan Cailles (1871–1951), Filipino commander
- Niall Caille (died 846), High King of Ireland
- Nicolas-Louis de Lacaille (1713–1762), French astronomer
- André Caillé (born 1943), Canadian electricity company executive
- Alain Caillé (born 1944), French sociologist and economist
- Gisèle Caille, former French racing cyclist
- Stefano Caille (born 2000), French professional footballer
- Florence Loiret Caille (born 1975), French actress

== Places ==
- Caille, Alpes-Maritimes, a commune in southeastern France
- Caille Island, a small islet between Grenada and Carriacou in the Grenadines
- Allonzier-la-Caille, a commune in the Haute-Savoie department in south-eastern France
- Boissy-aux-Cailles, a commune in the Seine-et-Marne department in the Île-de-France region
- Butte-aux-Cailles, a neighbourhood of Paris, France
- La Caille (crater), a lunar crater

== See also ==
- Pierre Caille (disambiguation)
