= Bosi =

Bosi may refer to

- Bósa saga ok Herrauðs
- Dāna in Korean language
- Bank of Scotland Ireland

== People ==
- Alfredo Bosi (1936–2021), Brazilian writer
- Claude Bosi (born 1972), French chef
- Ilio Bosi (1903–1995), Italian politician
- Maria Bosi (born 1954), Romanian handball player
- Silvana Bosi (1934–2020), Italian actress
- Stefano Bosi (born 1954), Italian table tennis player
- William Bosi (born 1998), British rock climber

== See also ==
- Lauro De Bosis (1901–1931), Italian poet, aviator and anti-fascist
