= John DeStefano =

John DeStefano could refer to:

- John M. DeStefano (died 2008), American artist
- John DeStefano Jr. (born 1955), American politician from Connecticut
- Johnny DeStefano, counselor to U.S. President Donald Trump
- John Di Stefano, name used by Giovanni Di Stefano (fraudster)

== See also ==
- Giovanni Di Stefano (disambiguation)
