= Stramigioli =

Stramigioli is an Italian surname. Notable people with the surname include:

- Giuliana Stramigioli (1914–1988), Italian businesswoman and academic
- Stefano Stramigioli (born 1968), Dutch engineer
