= Fusari =

Fusari is an Italian surname. Notable people with the surname include:

- Antonio Fusari (born 1942), Italian footballer
- Charley Fusari (1924–1985), American boxer
- Rob Fusari, American music producer
- Stefano Fusari (born 1983), Italian footballer
- Tatiana Fusari, American murderer
