= Stephano =

Stephano may refer to:

Fictional characters

- Stephano (The Tempest), a drunkard in Shakespeare's The Tempest
- An alias of Count Olaf in Lemony Snicket's A Series of Unfortunate Events

Other

- Stephano (moon), a natural satellite of the planet Uranus
- SS Stephano, a ship

== See also ==
- Stefano, an Italian name
- Stephanos, a Greek given name
