= Stefanoni =

Stefanoni (Italian pronunciation: [stefaˈnoːni]) is an Italian surname, derived from the name Stefano.

Notable people with this surname include:

- Ivo Stefanoni (born 1936), Italian rower
- Marina Stefanoni (born 2002), American squash player
- Daniele Stefanoni (born 1966), Italian paralympic rower
