= Andrea Celesti =

Italian painter (1637–1712)

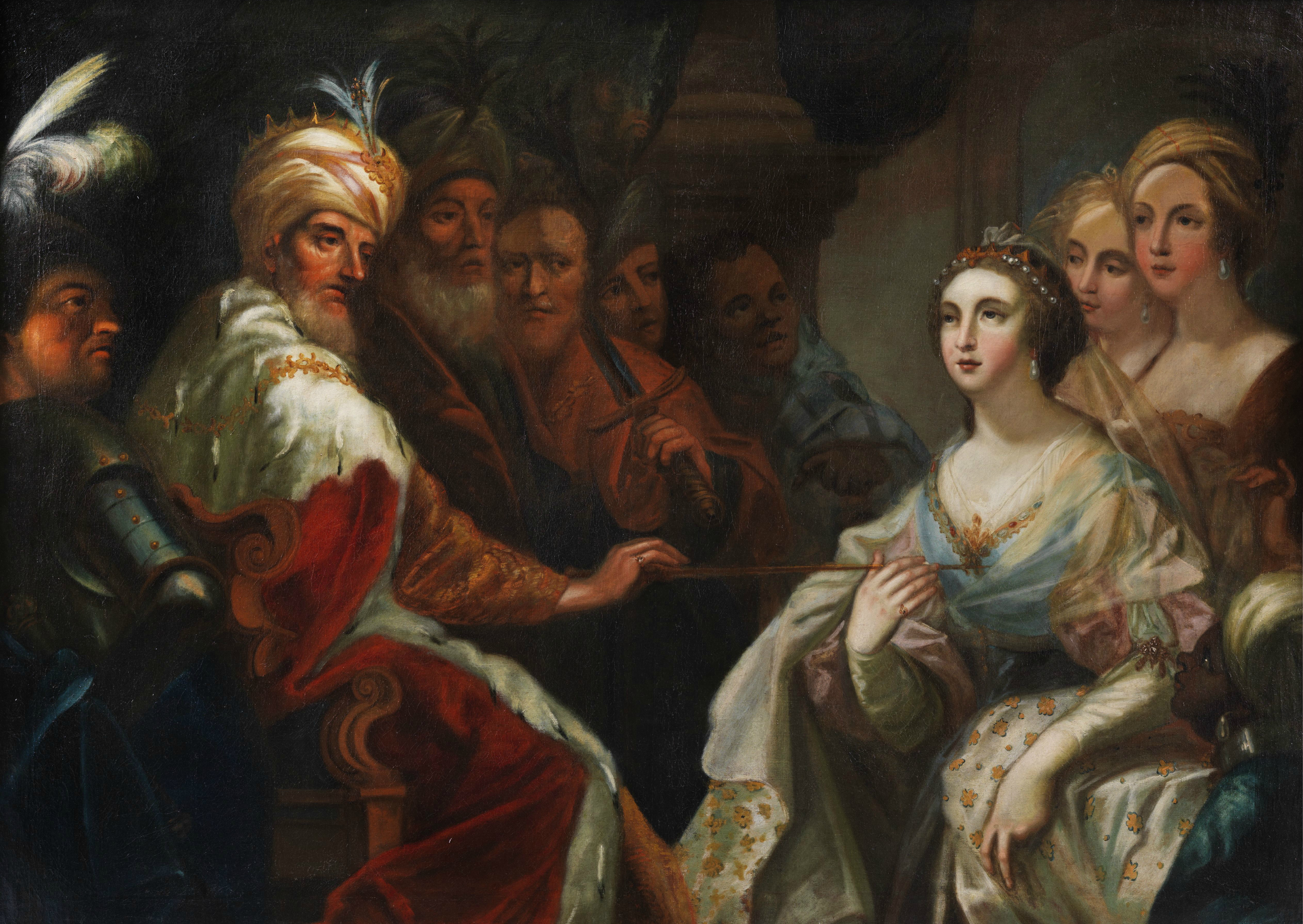
Andrea Celesti, Esther before King Ahasuerus

Andrea Celesti (1637–1712) was an Italian painter of the Baroque period, working in Venice. His style gravitated over the years from a turgid and academic weightiness to a lighter, looser brushstroke.

== Biography ==
Celesti was born in Venice and is buried in Toscolano.

He first trained with Matteo Ponzoni, then with Sebastiano Mazzoni. During his early years (1659–1669) he worked in Venice, both in sundry labors for Doge's palace, and frescoes for the main salon of the Palazzo Erizzo. In 1676, he was painted doge Nicolò Sagredo’s portrait for the Sala dello Scrutinio in Ducal Palace. For the same site, in 1680, he painted canvases of Moses destroys the golden calf. In 1681, he was awarded the title of Cavalieri by Doge Alvise Contarini. In 1684, he helped in the decoration of San Zaccaria. Some sources claim he joined a "collegio" for Venetian painters in 1687; perhaps this reflects that in 1708, he joined the Fraglia or guild of Venetian painters.

Legend holds Celesti, after a yearly public exhibition in the piazza San Marco, had to flee Venice when he angered Doge Contarini, when he displayed the Doge with a donkey’s ears of a donkey. He was then protected by his future patron Scipione Delaj and relocated inland. In about 1685, after some painting in Rovigo, he established a studio in Brescia.

For the Delaj family, starting in 1688, Celesti and his studio began painting a series of religious canvases for the Cathedral of Peter and Paul in Toscolano on the shores of Lake Garda. The initial canvases included the Vocation of Paul and Andrew, St Paul liberated from prison, the Death of Simon Magus, the Keys given to St Peter, a Martyrdom of Saints, the Miraculous Draught of Fishes, St Peter heals the sick. He painted the canvases of the presbytery, including an Annunciation, Adoration by Magi and Adoration by the Shepherds. In 1700, he returned to Toscolano to paint a Massacre of the Innocents for the space behind the facade. In 1708, he returned to paint for the chorus, Evangelists in the lunettes and an Exaltation of the Eucharist.

He also painted canvases for the church of Limone, the Sanctuary of Montecastello at Tignale, and the churches of San Francesco, and San Martino at Gargnano. He likely had a hand in the paintings by his collaborator Alessandro Campo for the Villa Bettoni in Gargnano.

In 1689 he decorated a room in the palazzo Delay. In 1696 in Treviso, Celesti painted a Final Judgment and the Death of Simon Magus. In the Castle of San Giusto in Trieste, a large ceiling painting with the Allegory of Venice is attributed to him. In other works, he painted altarpieces at Lonato (1690–93 and Desenzano. By 1700 Celesti was back in Venice, where he set up his studio. He painted frescoes for Villa Rinaldi Barbini (1705–07). For the Basilica di San Lorenzo in Verolanuova, Celesti Painted a Birth of the Virgin and an Assumption (c. 1707).

Andrea Celesti’s pupil included Albert Calvetti and Angelo Trevisani. His son, Stefano Celesti was also a painter.

== Paintings ==
=== Religious subjects ===
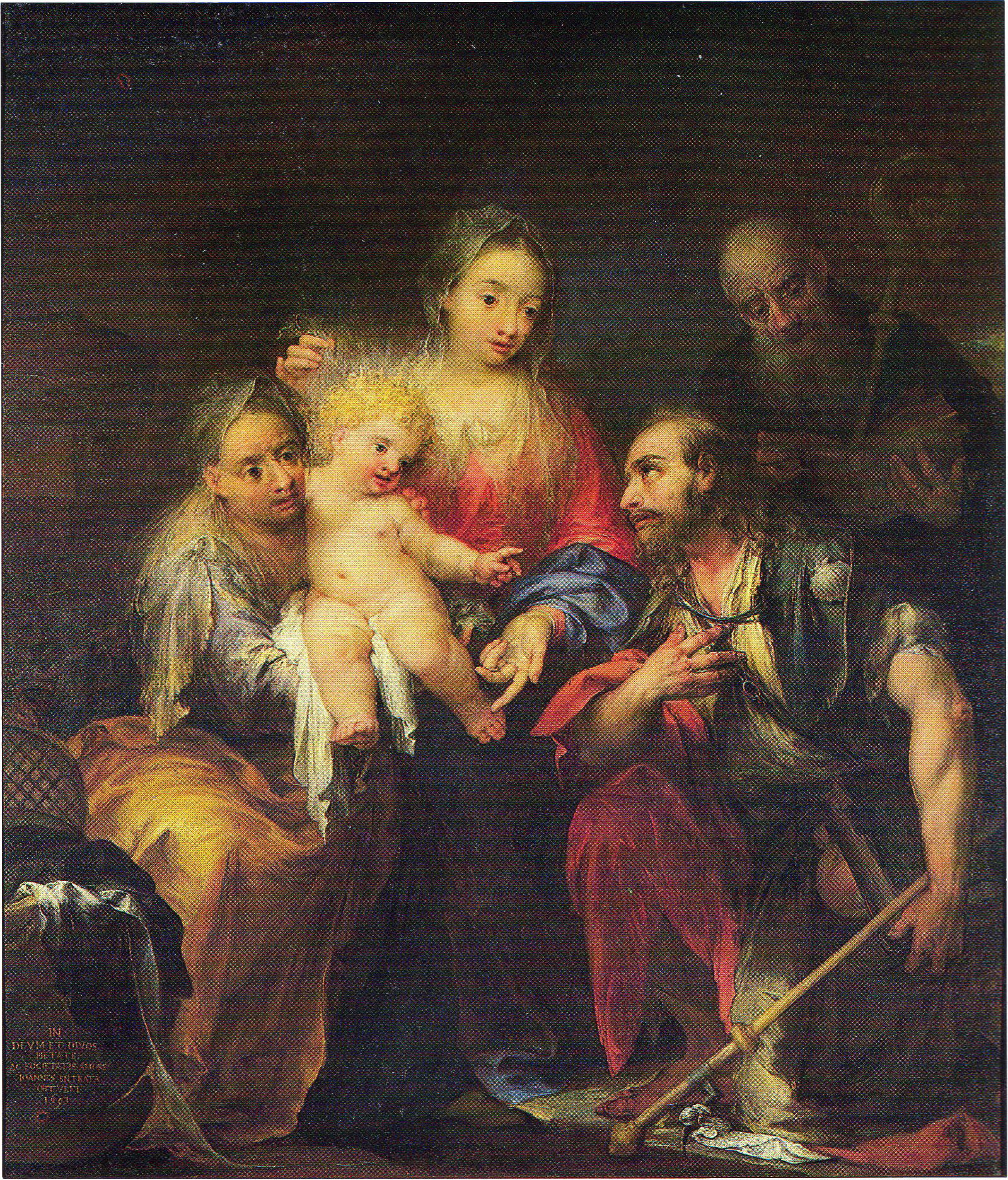
Madonna and Child with Saints Anne, Joachim, and Benedict, c. 1693

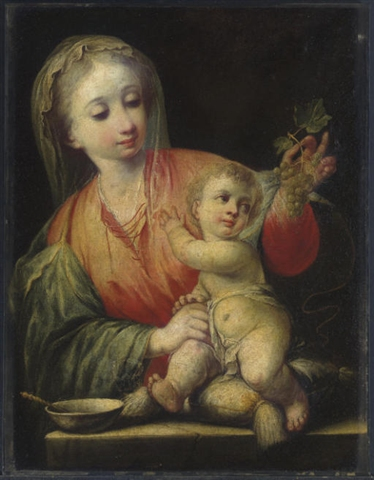
Virgin of the Grapes, c. 1690

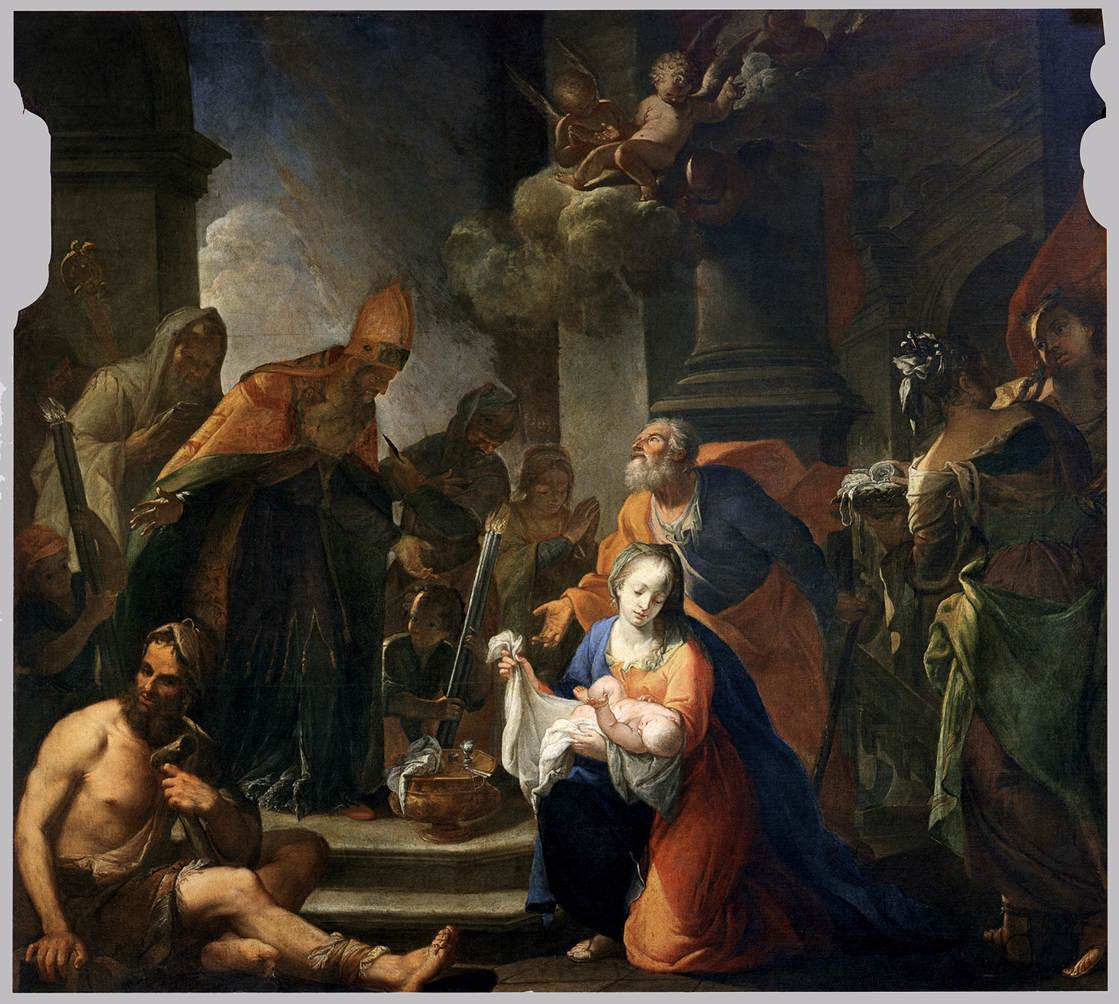
Presentation of Jesus at the Temple, c. 1710

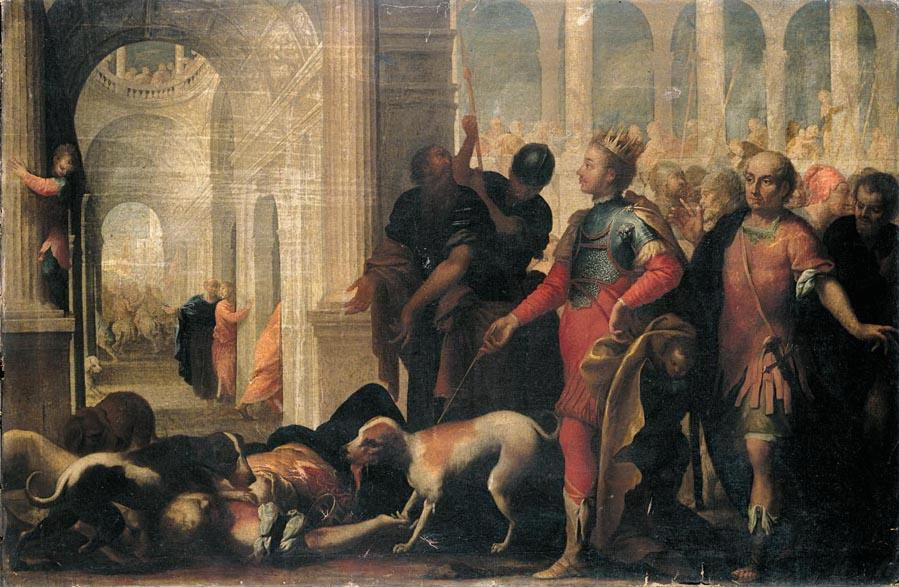
Queen Jezebel being punished by Jehu, c. 1650

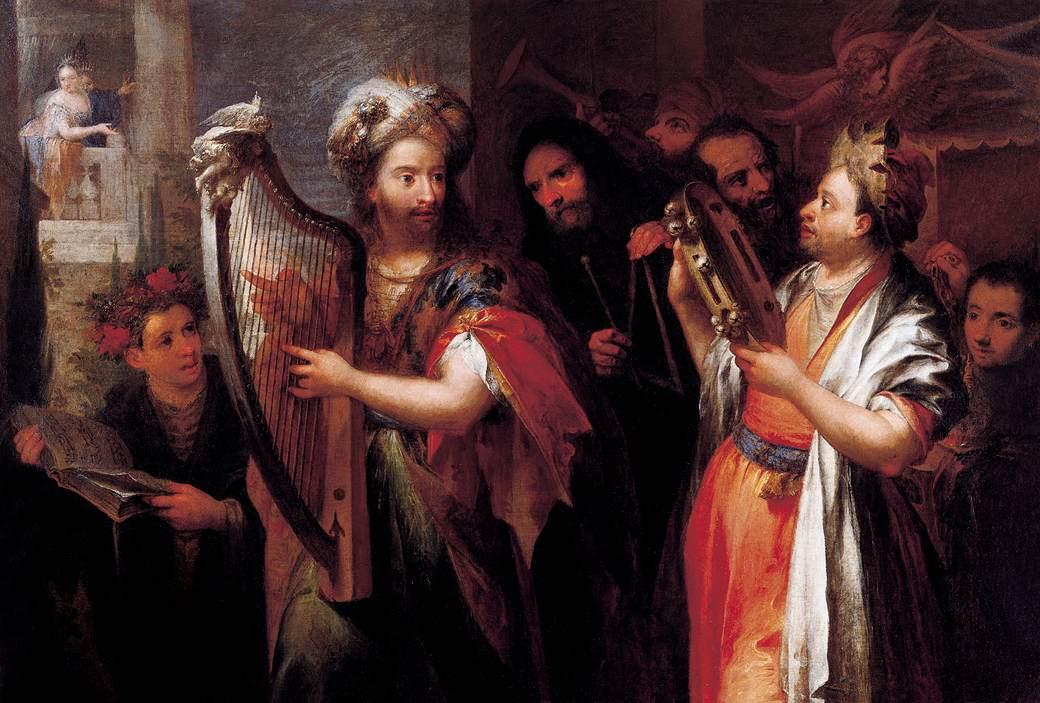
King David playing the Zither, .c 1650

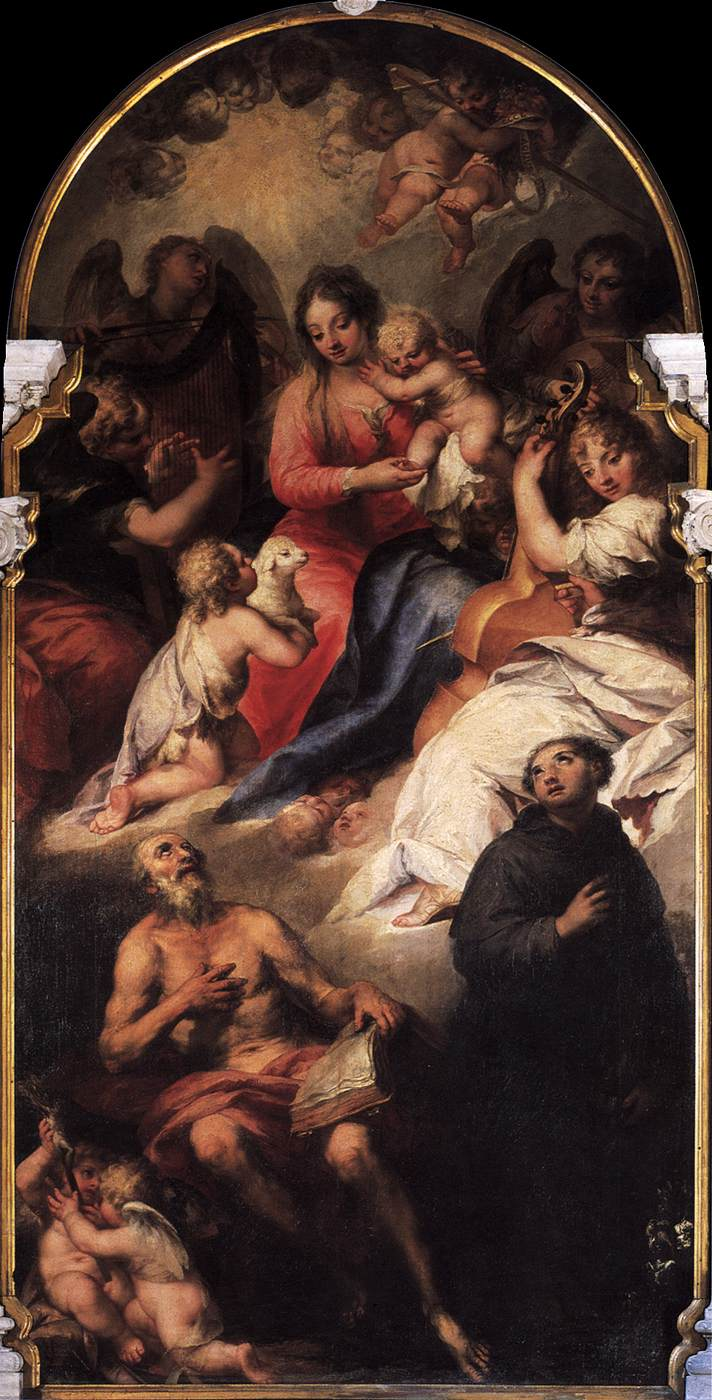
The Virgin and Child with the Infant St John Appearing to St Jerome and St Anthony, c. 1700

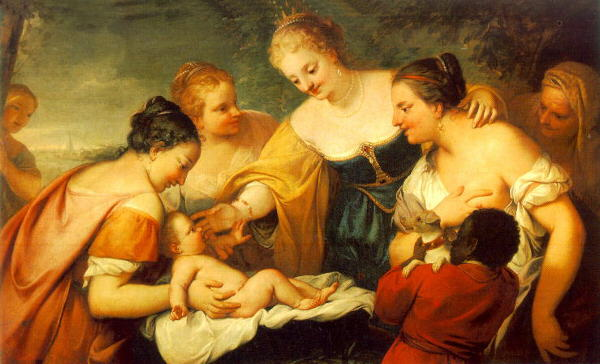
Moses saved from the water, c. 1700

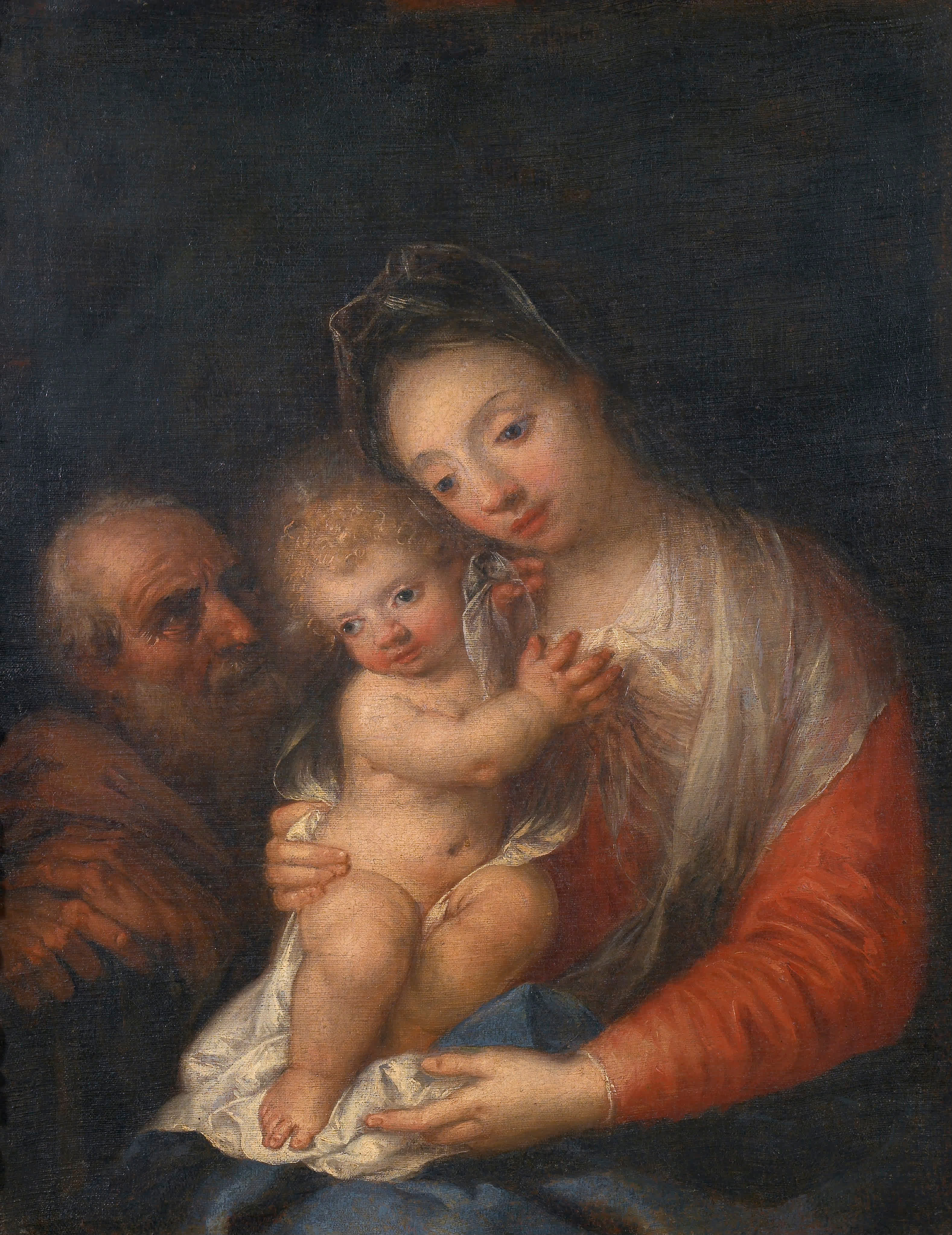
The Holy Family, c. 1690-1700

=== Mythological subjects ===
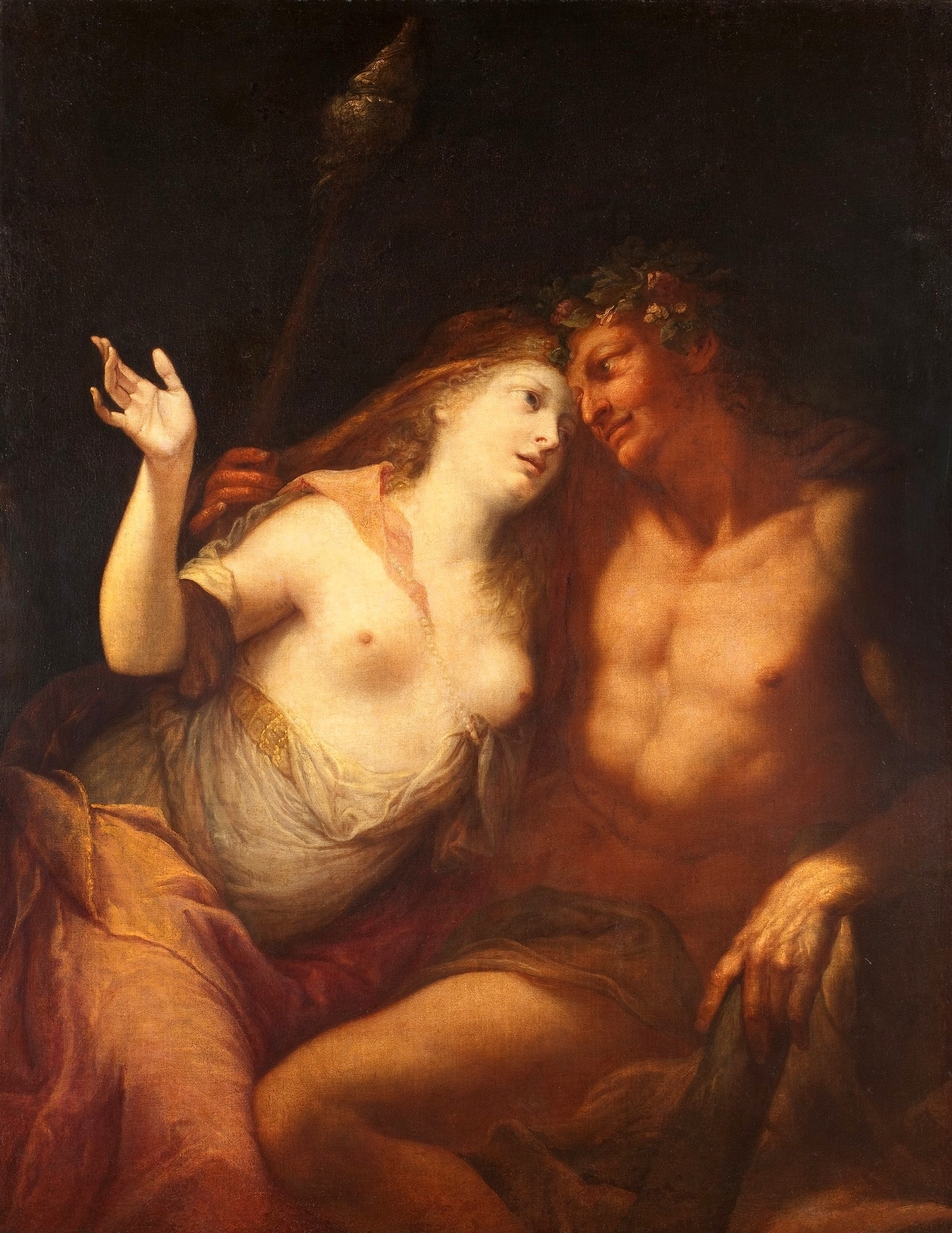
Hercules and Omphale, c. 1670

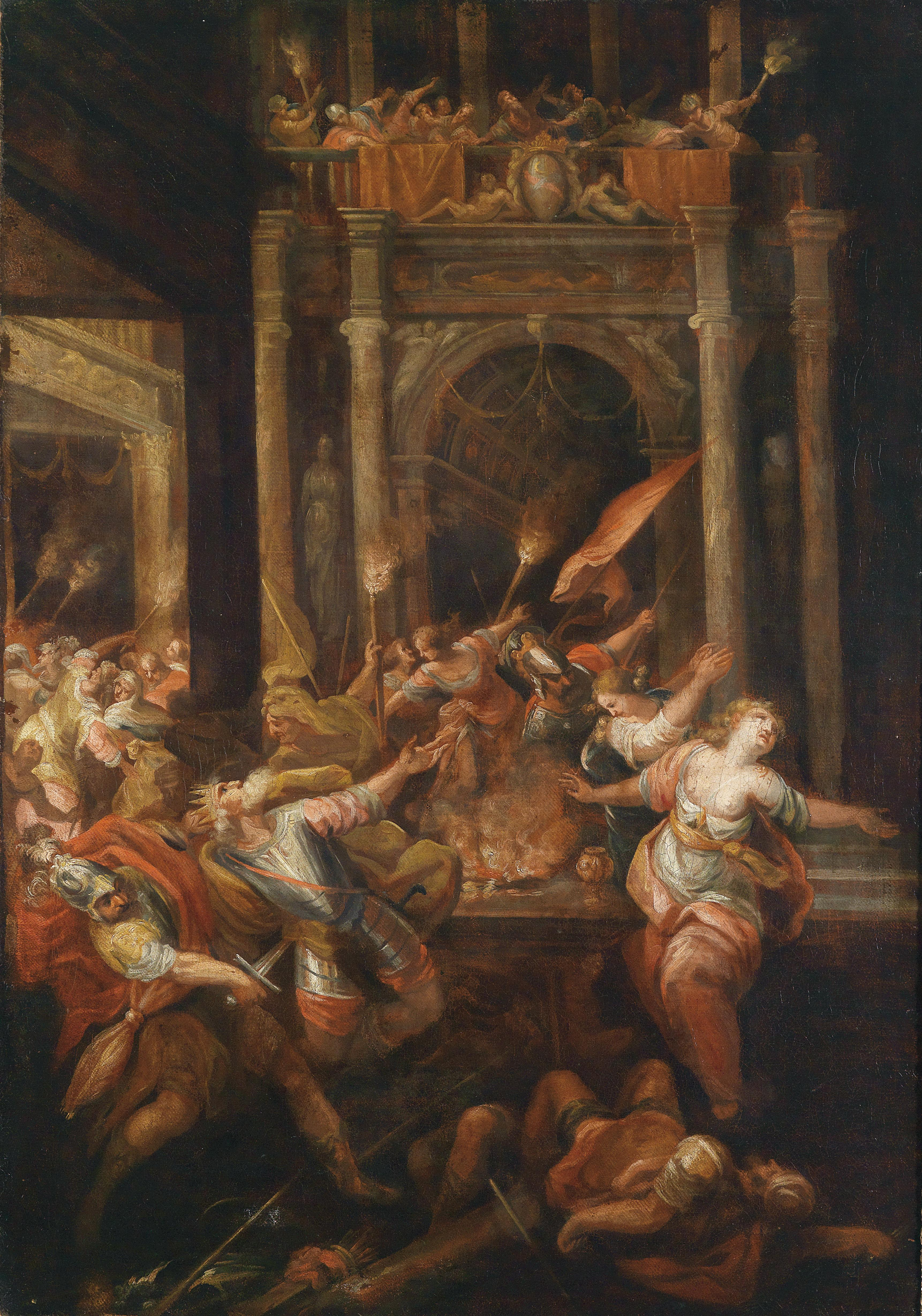
Death of King Priam, c. 1706

=== Portraits ===
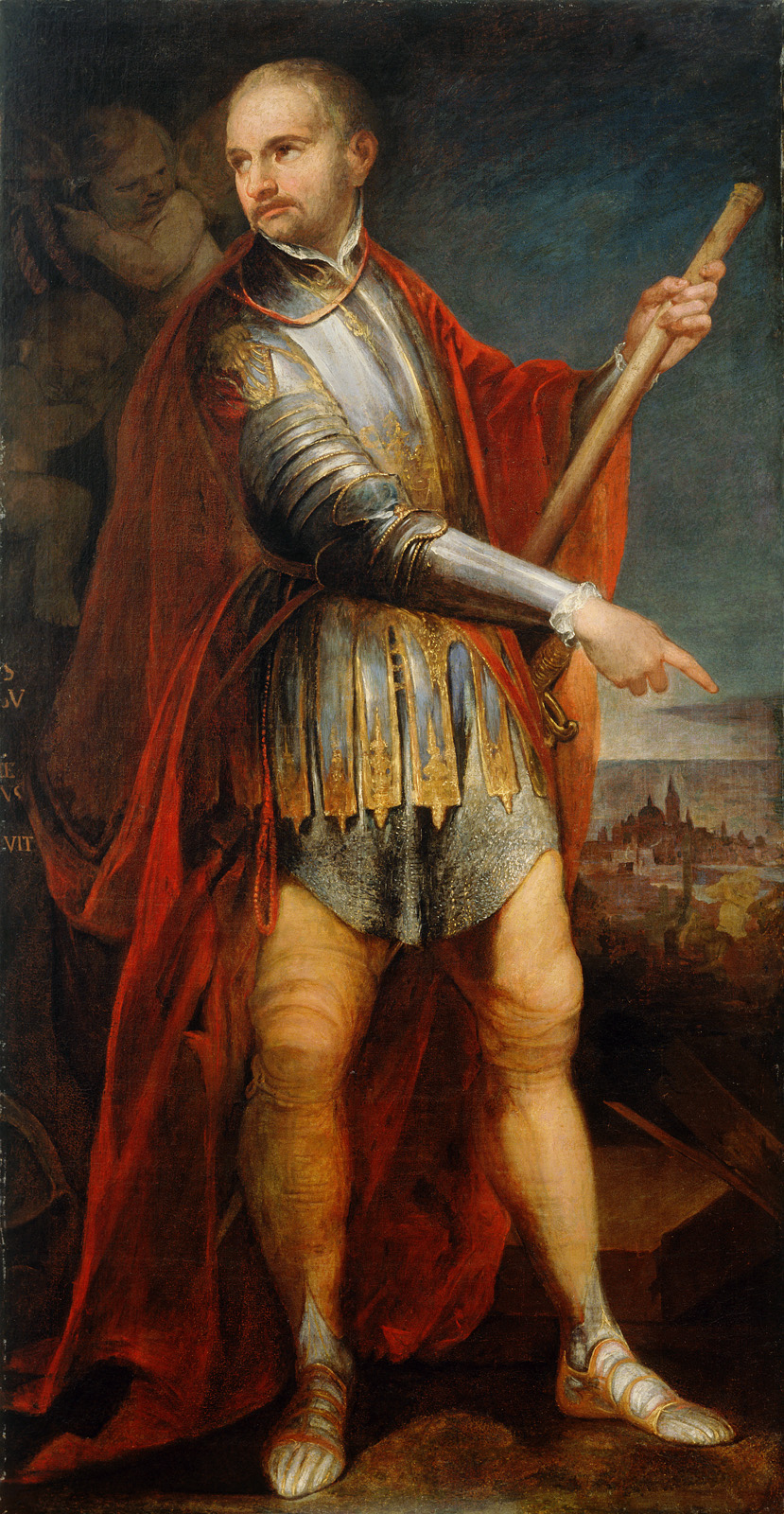
Portrait of Military Commander I, c. 1600s

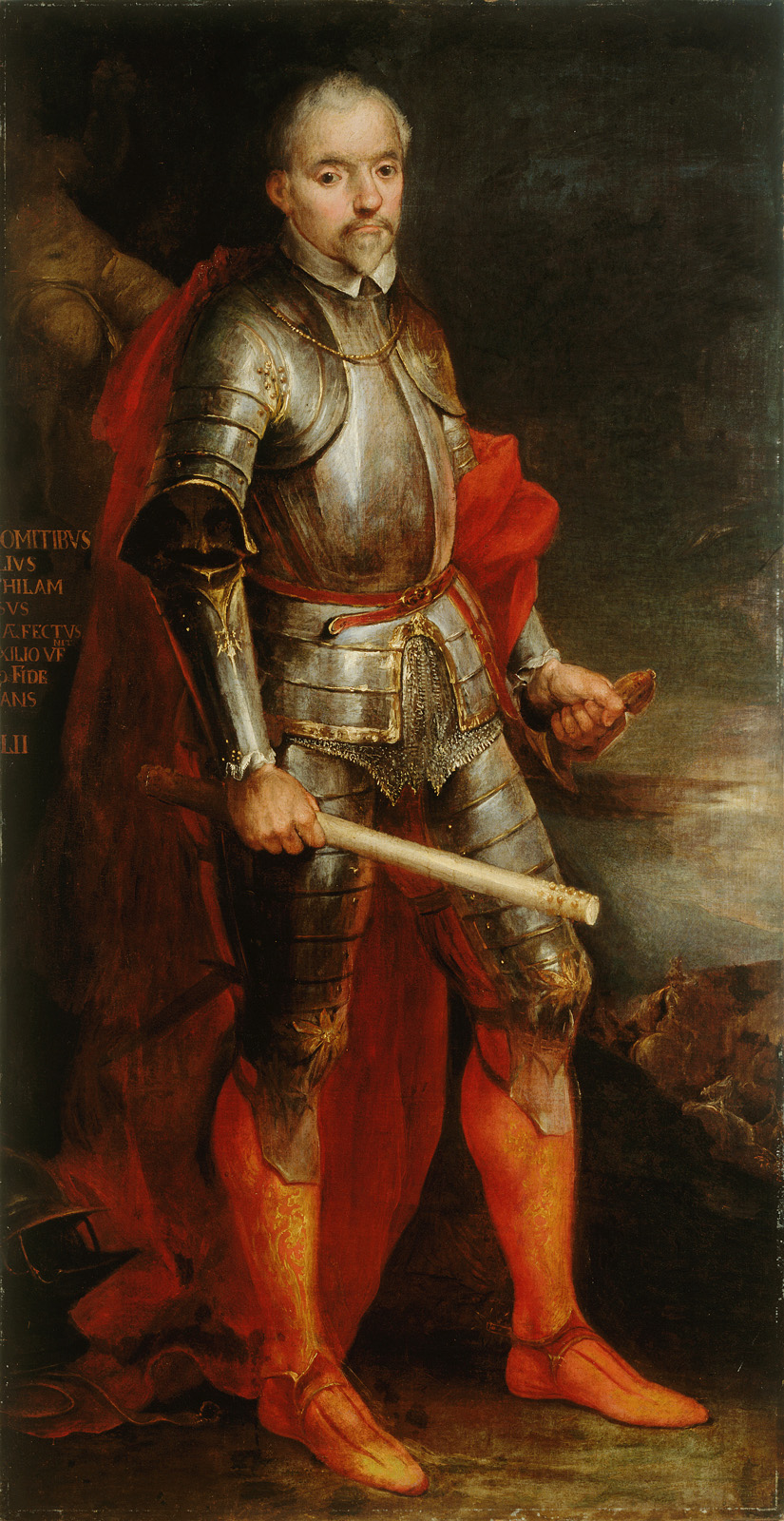
Portrait of Military Commander II, c. 1600s
