= Stefano Russo =

Stefano Russo may refer to:

- Stefano Russo (footballer, born 1989), Italian footballer
- Stefano Russo (footballer, born 2000), German-Italian footballer

== See also ==
- Russo
- Stefano Rosso (1948–2008), Italian singer-songwriter and guitarist
- Stefano Rosso (businessman) (born 1979), Italian businessman
