= Di Stefano =

Di Stefano is a patronymic Italian surname meaning "(the son) of Stephen". Notable people with the surname include:

- Alfredo Di Stéfano (1926–2014), Argentinian-Spanish footballer
- Andrea Di Stefano (born 1972), Italian actor
- Francesco di Stefano (c. 1422–1457), Italian painter
- Giordana Di Stefano (1995–2015), Italian femicide victim
- Giovanni di Stefano (disambiguation), several people
- Giuseppe Di Stefano (1921–2008), Italian tenor
- Manlio Di Stefano (born 1981), Italian politician
- Sergio Di Stefano (1939–2010), Italian voice actor
- Vincenzo di Stefano da Verona, Italian painter
- Vinícius Di Stefano (born 2002), Brazilian footballer
- Phil DiStefano (born 1946), 11th Chancellor of University of Colorado Boulder
