= Pierre Caille =

Pierre Caille may refer to:

- Pierre Caille (sculptor) (1911–1996), Belgian sculptor, painter, engraver, ceramicist and jeweller
- a man who bought a vineyard in 1543, now the Butte-aux-Cailles neighborhood in Paris

== See also ==
- Pierre (disambiguation)
- Caille (disambiguation)
