= Caille Island =

Island in Grenada

Coordinates: 12°17′10″N 61°34′55″W

Caille Island is a 155-acre private island situated 4 miles off the northern end of the Caribbean island of Grenada. It's adjacent to Ronde Island and lies between Grenada and Carriacou. Caille's name is believed to have derived from the French word “caillou” meaning “pebble” in English, which is indicative of the stones naturally adorning the landscape. Along with sandy beaches and bays along the coastline, an abundance of green vegetation, coconut palms, and a variety of fruit trees can be found.

Caille Island, also known as Isle de Caille or Ile de Caille, which is considered one of the youngest islands in the Lesser Antilles. Minimal archaeological survey have found Amerindian pottery in volcanic rock, corroborating the young age. It appears to have been uninhabited during most of the historic period, but in the late 19th/early 20th century, Caille functioned as a whaling station.
