= Stefano Celesti =

Italian painter

Stefano Celesti (active after 1635) was an Italian painter of the late-Baroque, active mainly in Venice and territories on the mainland.

He was born in Venice (or possibly Istria), the son of the Baroque Venetian painter Andrea Celesti. He was active in Istria, Brescia, and near Lago di Garda. In 1638 he painted a St Mark for the Cathedral of Koper. Two years later, he executed the portrait of the priest Pasquale da Rovigno for the Franciscan Refectory in the monastery of Sant'Anna in the same town, now in Gemona. In 1659, he painted a Madonna del Carmelo for the parish church of Verbosca . He worked with Pietro Bellotto in Koper, painting a Mystery of the Rosary and Last Supper.

For the church of Church of S. Antonio Abate in Sasso, in Gargnano, he painted a Madonna of the Rosary in 1658.

== Sources ==
- Studi romagnoli, a cura della Società di studi romagnoli, 2003, pag. 20.
- L. Anelli, P. Bellotti, A. Bonomi, I. Lechi e J. Rosengarten, Pietro Bellotti: 1625-1700, 1996.
- Italo Sennio, La Chiesa e il Convento di S. Anna in Capodistria, Koper, 1910.
- N. Pozza, Saggi e memorie di storia dell'arte, volume 30, 2006.
- G. Panazza, Le manifestazioni artistiche della sponda bresciana del Garda, in “Il Lago di Garda. Storia di una comunità lacuale, Salò, 1969, pag 252.
- Arte cristiana, a cura della Scuola beato angelico, Società amici dell'arte cristiana, volume 79, numeri 742-747, Milano 1991.
- Pietro Stancovich, Biografia degli uomini distinti dell'Istria, 1829.
- Gargnano visitor’s site
