= Stefano Marchand =

French merchant

Stefano Marchand (13 July 1755 – 1793) was a French merchant, whose journal of travels in the Pacific circa 1790-1792 was published in 1798 in Paris by Fleurieu.

Stefano was born in the then French colony of Grenada, and died in the then French colony of Mauritius. In his youth, he had traveled on merchant trade ships to the Antilles and India. On his return from Bengal in 1788, he met a captain Portlocke in St Helena who described his profitable trade in furs in the American Northwest. In December 1790, he was entrusted by a Marseille shipping group, Casa Baux, to travel on the vessel Solido to the American Northwest to trade for animal pelts. The first leg of his journey took him on June 12, 1791, past the Marquesas, from there traveling northwest, he claimed discovery of various islands previously visited by Captain Cook. His lengthy stays meant he only reached in August 7 to reach Cape of Edgecombe (near present-day Kruzof Island, Alaska). He proceeded north to Tchin Kitanae bay (also called Nordfolk Bay, now Sitka Sound), where he traded for otter pelts. He then moved to Nootka Sound and proceeded south along the coast. He left America on 8 September and made his way to the Hawaiian Islands. On 4 October he visited Oitaiti (Tahiti), and on 3 November reached Macao. However, Chinese authorities had prohibited the trading of fur at the port. He returned to France, stopping at Mauritius. He returned to Toulouse on 14 August 1792. While his trip was an economic failure, he was feted by the Revolutionary authorities for his travels.

His diaries were published as Viaggio a torno al mundi negli 1790, 1791, e 1792 di Stefano Marchand.
