= Stefano Levialdi Ghiron =

Italian computer scientist

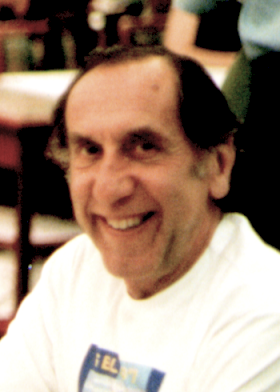
Stefano Levialdi (1997)

Stefano (or Esteban) Levialdi Ghiron (1936–2015) was an Italian computer scientist who was a full professor at the Sapienza University of Rome. His research areas included visual programming languages, image processing, pattern recognition, and human-computer interaction.

Stefano Levialdi graduated in Telecommunications Engineering from the University of Buenos Aires in 1959. He lectured in Electronics at the University of Genova and was a researcher of the National Research Council of Italy (CNR) for 13 years, working on parallel image processing. In 1981 he became full professor at the University of Bari, and moved to the Sapienza University of Rome in 1983. He was founder and co-Editor, together with Shi-Kuo Chang, of the Journal of Visual Languages and Computing.
