= Stefano Pace =

18th-century Maltese philosopher

Stephen Pace
- Born: Malta
- Died: Malta
- Occupation: Philosophy

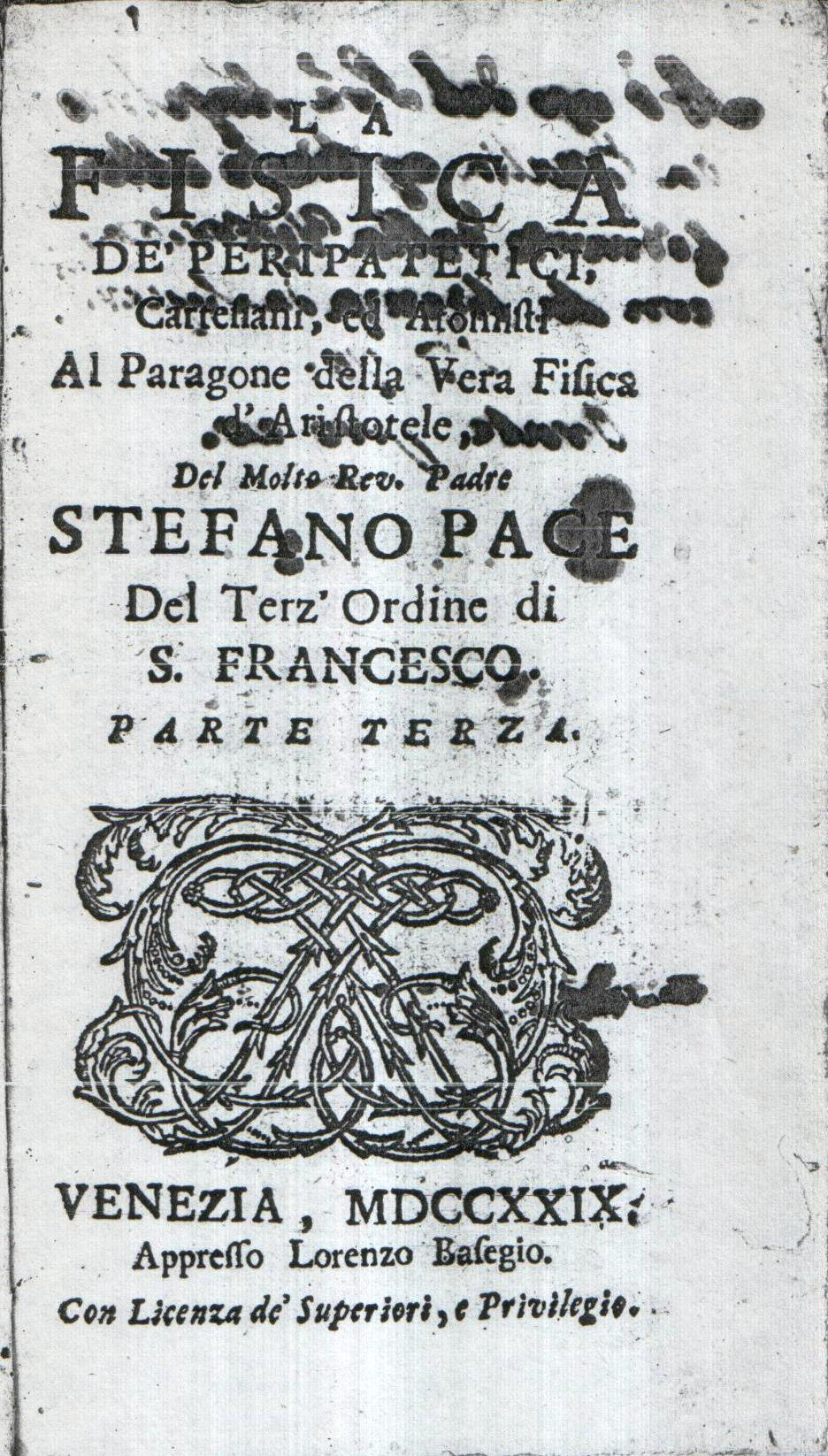
Frontispiece of Stephen Pace’s third volume of philosophy

Stefano (or Stephen) Pace (1695–1735) was a minor Maltese mediaeval philosopher who specialised mainly in physics.

== Life ==
Unfortunately, very little is known about the private life of Pace. It seems that, in his youth, he might have been a student at the Studium Generale of the Dominicans at Valletta, Malta. It seems he was a diocesan priest. Whatever the case, it is certain that he was a member of the clerical branch of the Franciscan Order in Malta. No portrait of Pace has been discovered so far.

== Extant work ==
=== Composition ===
Only one work of Stephen Pace is known. It is a work in three volumes, of which only one – the third – is still extant.

This third volume is titled La Fisica (Physics). However, its complete title is La Fisica De’ Peripatetici, Cartesiani, ed Atomisti al paragone della vera fisica d’Aristotele (The Physics of the Peripatetics, Cartesians, and Atomists, as compared to the True Physics of Aristotle).

It might be guessed that the former two volumes would have dealt with metaphysics and perhaps logic. But this, of course, cannot be ascertained.

In any case, it is interesting that this book (and presumably the other volumes as well) was published in Venice, at the publishing house of Lorenzo Basegio. This alone might attest to Pace’s foreign experience as well as his standing amongst foreigners.

The extant volume on physics is in Italian and was published in 1729. The other volumes of the set must have been similar, and published around that year too. La Fisica contains 522 pages.

=== Content ===
The volume is divided into seven Treatises, and each one is sub-divided into Chapters. The title of the book might give the impression that Pace deals with physics in the sense commonly understood, as general or particular physics. However, in fact the work is specifically about the physical qualities and characteristics of animals, specifically from the point of view of Aristotle.

Pace takes pains to refuse the interpretations given by various other Aristotelian commentators or by philosophers in general. As promised, he includes in his refutation some Cartesians, Atomists, and also other Physicalists.

His detailed analysis in the treatises, all dealing with animals, focuses on the vegetative soul, the sensitive soul; movement, reproduction and nutrition, and the nature and faculties of the sensitive soul and the rational souls. At the end of his work, Pace includes an illustration on the physical structure of the eye, and the brain.

=== Appreciation ===
It can only be imagined what the two former volumes of Pace’s trilogy dealt with. However, if the third extant volume is anything to go by with, they must have been enormously interesting from a philosophical point of view. Not only as regards content but surely also as regards intensity, extensiveness and depth. Especially if they dealt with metaphysics and logic.

Having said this, it is certain that much research is needed in order that the full value of Pace is recognised. It is a pity, for instance, that the first two volumes of his trilogy have not yet been located. These would surely contribute to a fuller understanding of his philosophy and his worth.

Furthermore, the dearth of information concerning Pace’s personal life is truly unfortunate. He was not part of the great monastic movements, and yet he seems to have been a considerable success, both locally and abroad. This alone must be a sign of his esteem and value. The discoveries to be made might well justify the effort.

== Sources ==
- Mark Montebello, Il-Ktieb tal-Filosofija f’Malta (A Source Book of Philosophy in Malta), PIN Publications, Malta, 2001.

== See also ==
Philosophy in Malta
