= Stefano Trespidi =

Italian opera stage director

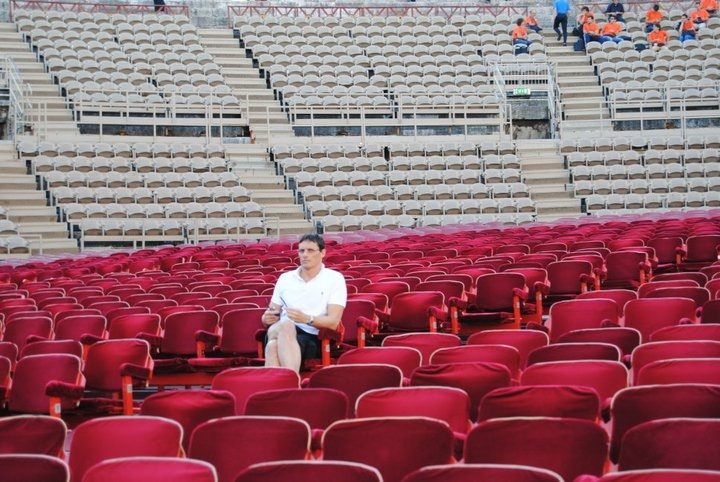
Arena di Verona

Stefano Trespidi (Italian pronunciation: [ˈsteːfano ˈtrɛspidi]; born May 23, 1970) is an Italian opera stage director.

Born in Verona, Italy, Trespidi grew up near the Arena di Verona, where he began acting and interning as a youth. He earned a law degree from University of Trento in International Law (1996), but did not enter the business world. He earned his Masters diploma from the Teatro La Scala in Milan (1999).

Trespidi first met Franco Zeffirelli in 1995 during the staging of Carmen at the Arena di Verona. Trespidi has since regularly served on the directorial productions teams in collaboration with Zeffirelli on various productions at the Arena Di Verona, such as Il Trovatore (2001), Aida (2002), Madama Butterfly (2004), Turandot (2010), and Pagliacci (2010). January, 2019, Stefano Trespidi became vice artistic director of the Arena di Verona.

Trespidi made his US opera directorial debut at LA Opera in Los Angeles with a revival of the Franco Zeffirelli production of Pagliacci (alongside Gianni Schicchi as directed by Woody Allen) in September 2015.

== Productions directed ==
- La Bohème, Teatro Colon, Buenos Aires, Argentina (Oct 2018)
- Plácido Domingo - Antología de la Zarzuela, Arena di Verona, Italy (July 2017)
- La Traviata, Teatro Colon in Buenos Aires, Argentina (September 2017)
- Aida, Georgian National Theatre (March 2017)
- Nabucco, Teatro di San Carlo in Naples Italy (July 2016)
- Aida, Teatro di Pisa (2016), Teatro Social di Rovigo (2015)
- Die lustige Witwe, Operaestate Festival Veneto (2014)
- Madama Butterfly, Teatro Verde di Padova (2014)
- Die lustige Witwe, Teatro Social di Rovigo (2014)
- Verdi Gala, Arena di Verona (2013)
- Placido Domingo Gala, Arena di Verona (2012), Teatro Verdi di Trieste (2010)
- The marriage of Figaro, Amarante (2007)
- Poncheilli's ll Parlatore Eterno, Teatro Sociale di Lecco (2006)
- La Traviata, Filarmonico di Verona (2005)
- Tristan and Isolde, Filarmonico di Verona (2004)
