= Stefano Cernotto =

16th-century Italian painter

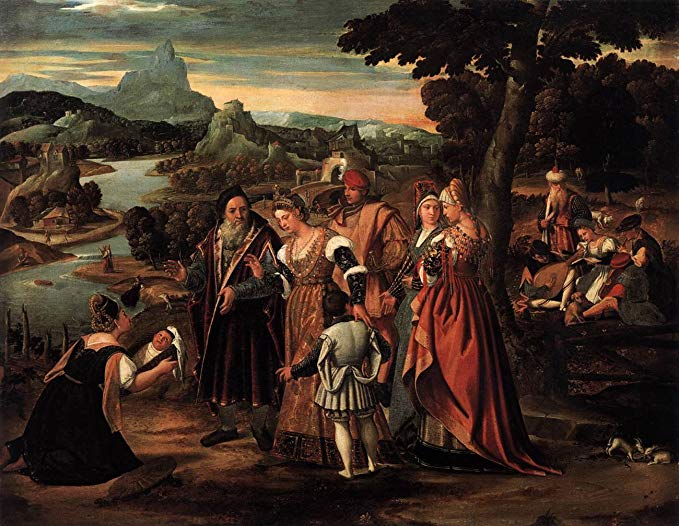
The Finding of Moses

Stefano Cernotto (fl. 1530–1542) was an Italian painter of Croatian origin. His name has numerous variations but, at birth, it was most likely Cernotis or Zernotis.

== Life and work ==
Nothing was known of his life until some documents were discovered in 1902. He was probably born on Rab, a small island just off the Croatian coast which, at that time, was part of the Republic of Venice. By 1530, apparently already a painter, he was in Venice. where he is on record as paying taxes for his wife, Marina. In 1533, he designated his brother, a priest named Gerolamo, to be his executor and legal representative. In the 1548 register of tithes, Marina is described as a widow.

At first, his only attributed work involved three paintings that were part of a project begun in 1530 by Bonifacio Veronese at the Palazzo dei Camerlenghi. Two were always known to be his. One, originally thought to be Veronese's work, was reattributed when the name "Stefano", in Hebrew letters, was discovered in a cartouche. As of now, some fifty works have been identified as his with some certainty. Many of his works were originally attributed to Francesco Vecellio and Polidoro da Lanciano.

There is some evidence that he worked for Titian in the 1520s and was primarily his student, rather than Veronese's, as formerly believed.
