= Giovanni di Stefano (architect) =

Italian architect

Giovanni di Stefano (fl. 1366 – 1391) — was an Italian architect who designed the tabernacle at the Basilica of St. John Lateran in 1367.
