= Stefano Hunt =

- Born: 11 August 1991 (age 35)
- Height: 182 cm (6 ft 0 in)
- Weight: 86 kg (190 lb)
- School: Nudgee College
- Notable relative: Karmichael Hunt (cousin)

Rugby union career
- Position: Utility back
Super Rugby
Years	Team	Apps	(Points)
2010	Force	1	(0)

Stefano Hunt (born 11 August 1991) is an Australian former professional rugby union player.

Educated at Nudgee College, Hunt played first XV rugby in the same school side as future Wallaby James O'Connor and could play as a fly-half, inside centre or full-back. He was an Australian Schoolboys representative player.

Hunt was recruited by the Western Force in 2009 out of the Queensland Reds academy and signed a rookie contract. He made one Super 14 appearances for the Force, as a substitute in round two of the 2010 season against the Hurricanes in Wellington and shared his debut with housemate Joel Rapana.

In 2017, Hunt began an overseas stint with Romanian club Timișoara Saracens.

Hunt is a cousin of rugby league player Karmichael Hunt.
