= Stefano Pellegrini =

Stefano Pellegrini may refer to:

- Stefano Pellegrini (footballer, born 1953) (1953–2018), Italian footballer with Roma and Avellino in the 1970s
- Stefano Pellegrini (footballer, born 1967), Italian footballer with Sampdoria, Roma and Udinese in the 1980s and 1990s
