= Stefano Marchetti =

Stefano Marchetti may refer to:

- Stefano Marchetti (ice hockey) (born 1986), Italian ice hockey player
- Stefano Marchetti (footballer, born 1963), Italian football player
- Stefano Marchetti (footballer, born 1998), Italian football player
