= Distefano =

Distefano is a surname. Notable people with the surname include:

- Benny Distefano (born 1962), American baseball player
- Chris Distefano (born 1984), American comedian
- David Distéfano (born 1987), Argentine footballer
- Juan Carlos Distéfano (1933–2026), Argentine sculptor, graphic designer, and educator
- Tony DiStefano (born 1957), American motocross racer
