= Giovanni di Stefano =

Giovanni di Stefano may refer to:

- Giovanni di Stefano (sculptor) (1443 – c. 1506), Italian sculptor
- Giovanni di Stefano (architect) (fl. 1366–1391), Italian architect who designed the tabernacle at the Basilica of St. John Lateran
- Giovanni Di Stefano (fraudster) (born 1955), Italian fraudster involved in various legal cases
