= Stefano Boccaletti =

Italian physicist

- Born: October 21, 1966 (age 59); Florence, Italy
- Citizenship: Italian
- Education: University of Florence
- Scientific career
- Workplaces: CNR; University of Navarre; Technical University of Madrid; Italian Embassy in Israel

Stefano Boccaletti (born 21 October 1966) is an Italian physicist. He is senior researcher at the CNR's Institute for Complex Systems in Florence, Italy. His research is mainly concerned with nonlinear and statistical physics, and complex systems sciences with applications to systems biology and systems medicine, data and networks sciences, social science and engineering, among others.

== Education and career ==
Boccaletti received his PhD in physics at the University of Florence on 1995.

From January 1998 to September 1998 he was associate professor of physics at the University of Navarre in Spain. From March 2001 to December 2005 he was researcher at the National Institute of Optics in Italy. From April 2011 to December 2012 he was chair of computational systems biology at the Center for Biomedical Technologies of the Technical University of Madrid. Since January 2006 he has been senior researcher at the CNR-Institute for Complex Systems in Florence, Italy, as well as visiting scientist or honorary professor at five international universities.

He was the scientific attache at the Italian Embassy in Israel from January 2007 to January 2011 and from April 2014 to April 2018.

He is currently editor-in-chief of Chaos Solitons and Fractals and of Chaos Solitons and Fractals X.

== Research ==
Boccaletti's major research interests include the theoretical modeling of pattern formation and competition in nonlinear optics, fluid dynamics and excitable media, the study of chaos recognition, control and synchronization, and the study of synchronization in spatially extended systems and in complex networks.

He co-authored the first experimental evidence of bulk-boundary transition, domain coexistence and control of two-dimensional patterns in nonlinear optics. Boccaletti contributed several influential papers on synchronization phenomena in extended systems and complex networks, and in particular he introduced the classification method of complex networks in terms of their propensity to synchronization, which is the common standard today. The monograph ¨Complex Networks: Structure and Dynamics¨, published in Physics Reports in 2006 became the most quoted paper in that journal.

== Awards and honors ==
In 1998 Boccaletti was awarded the prestigious individual EU grant "Marie Curie" n. ERBFMBICT983466.

In 2015 he received a PhD honoris causa from the University Rey Juan Carlos of Madrid.

He is currently an honorary member of the Italian Society for Chaos and Complexity, and became a member of the Academia Europaea in 2016.

He is guest professor at the Northwestern Polytechnical University in Xi'an and the East China Normal University in Shanghai.

== Selected publications ==
- Boccaletti, Stefano, et al. "Complex Networks: Structure and Dynamics." Physics Reports, vol. 424, no. 4–5, 1 Feb. 2006, pp. 175–308., doi:10.1016/j.physrep.2005.10.009.
- Boccaletti, Stefano, et al. "The Synchronization of Chaotic Systems." Physics Reports, vol. 366, no. 1–2, 1 Aug. 2002, pp. 1–101., doi:10.1016/s0370-1573(02)00137-0.
- Boccaletti, Stefano, et al. "The Structure and Dynamics of Multilayer Networks." Physics Reports, vol. 544, no. 1, 1 Nov. 2014, pp. 1–122., doi:10.1016/j.physrep.2014.07.001.
- Boccaletti, Stefano, et al. "The Control of Chaos: Theory and Applications." Physics Reports, vol. 329, no. 3, 1 May 2000, pp. 103–197., doi:10.1016/s0370-1573(99)00096-4.
- Chavez, M., et al. "Synchronization Is Enhanced in Weighted Complex Networks." Physical Review Letters, vol. 94, no. 21, 2 June 2005, p. 218701., doi:10.1103/physrevlett.94.218701.
- Perc, Matjaž, et al. "Statistical Physics of Human Cooperation." Physics Reports, vol. 687, 8 May 2017, pp. 1–51., doi:10.1016/j.physrep.2017.05.004.
- Boccaletti, Stefano, et al. "Unifying Framework for Synchronization of Coupled Dynamical Systems." Physical Review E, vol. 63, no. 6, 29 May 2001, p. 066219., doi:10.1103/physreve.63.066219.
- Zhang, Xiyun, et al. "Explosive Synchronization in Adaptive and Multilayer Networks." Physical Review Letters, vol. 114, no. 3, 21 Jan. 2015, p. 038701., doi:10.1103/physrevlett.114.038701.
- Danziger, Michael M., et al. "Dynamic Interdependence and Competition in Multilayer Networks." Nature Physics, vol. 15, no. 2, 26 Nov. 2018, pp. 178–185., doi:10.1038/s41567-018-0343-1.
- Wang, Zhen, et al. "Exploiting a Cognitive Bias Promotes Cooperation in Social Dilemma Experiments." Nature Communications, vol. 9, no. 1, 27 July 2018, doi:10.1038/s41467-018-05259-5.
- Li, Xuelong, et al. "Punishment Diminishes the Benefits of Network Reciprocity in Social Dilemma Experiments." Proceedings of the National Academy of Sciences, vol. 115, no. 1, 19 Dec. 2017, pp. 30–35., doi:10.1073/pnas.1707505115.
- Dai, X, et al. "Discontinuous Transitions and Rhythmic States in the D-Dimensional Kuramoto Model Induced by a Positive Feedback with the Global Order Parameter." Physical Review Letters, vol. 125, no. 19, 5 Nov. 2020, pp. 194101, doi:10.1103/PhysRevLett.125.194101.
