= Stefano Raise =

Italian footballer

Personal information
- Date of birth: 8 August 1932
- Place of birth: Grado, Italy
- Date of death: 6 February 2008 (aged 75)
- Position: Midfielder

Senior career*
Years	Team	Apps	(Gls)
1953–1955	Hellas Verona	21	(3)
1956–1966	Catanzaro	312	(26)
Total		333	(29)
- * Club domestic league appearances and goals

Stefano Raise (8 August 1932 – 6 February 2008) was an Italian former footballer who played as a midfielder.

== Club career ==
Raise debuted with Hellas Verona in 1953 during their Serie B campaign. The following season Raise scored two goals in 11 games, before transferring to U.S. Catanzaro in the summer. Raise finished with a total of 3 goals in 21 games for Verona.

During his first season with Catanzaro, Raise scored 10 goals in 34 games of their 1956–66 campaign in Serie C. In his fourth season at Catanzaro, Raise helped the team secure promotion into Serie B. In the team's first season back in Serie B, Raise scored 1 goal in 37 matches. Raise continued to play for another 5 seasons with the Calabrian side and even went on to captain the team. Raise was apart the squad that reached the 1966 Coppa Italia Final. Catanzaro lost the final 2–1 against ACF Fiorentina in Rome, however Raise did not play. By the end of the 1956–66 campaign, Raise had spent 11 seasons with the club, 4 in Serie C and 7 in Serie B. His total record for Serie B with the club ended with 6 goals in 184 appearances. His total record for the club across all league games ended with 26 goals in 312 appearances.

== Career statistics ==
=== Club ===
Appearances and goals by club, season and competition
Club	Season	League			Cup		Continental		Other		Total	
Club	Season	Division	Apps	Goals	Apps	Goals	Apps	Goals	Apps	Goals	Apps	Goals
Hellas Verona F.C.	1953–54	Serie B	10	1	—		—		—		10	1
Hellas Verona F.C.	1954–55	Serie B	11	2	—		—		—		11	2
Hellas Verona F.C.	Total		21	3	0	0	0	0	0	0	21	3
U.S. Catanzaro 1929	1955–56	Serie C	34	10	—		—		—		34	10
U.S. Catanzaro 1929	1956–57	Serie C	34	4	—		—		—		34	4
U.S. Catanzaro 1929	1957–58	Serie C	27	6	—		—		—		27	6
U.S. Catanzaro 1929	1958–59	Serie C	33	0	? (Note: No lineups or data available, CZ: 3 matches)	0	—		—		33	0
U.S. Catanzaro 1929	1959–60	Serie B	37	1	? (Note: No lineups available, CZ: 1 match)	0	—		—		37	1
U.S. Catanzaro 1929	1960–61	Serie B	37	1	?	0	—		—		37	1
U.S. Catanzaro 1929	1961–62	Serie B	34	2	? (Note: No lineups available, CZ: 4 Matches)	0	—		—		34	2
U.S. Catanzaro 1929	1962–63	Serie B	27	0	? (Note: No lineups available, CZ: 2 Matches)	0	—		—		27	0
U.S. Catanzaro 1929	1963–64	Serie B	32	1	?	0	—		—		32	1
U.S. Catanzaro 1929	1964–65	Serie B	16	1	?	0	—		—		16	1
U.S. Catanzaro 1929	1965–66	Serie B	1	0	0	0	—		—		1	0
U.S. Catanzaro 1929	Total		312	26	0	0	0	0	0	0	312	26
Total			333	29	0	0	0	0	0	0	333	29

== Honours ==
U.S. Catanzaro

- Serie C: 1958–59 (Girone B)
