= Stefano D'Amico =

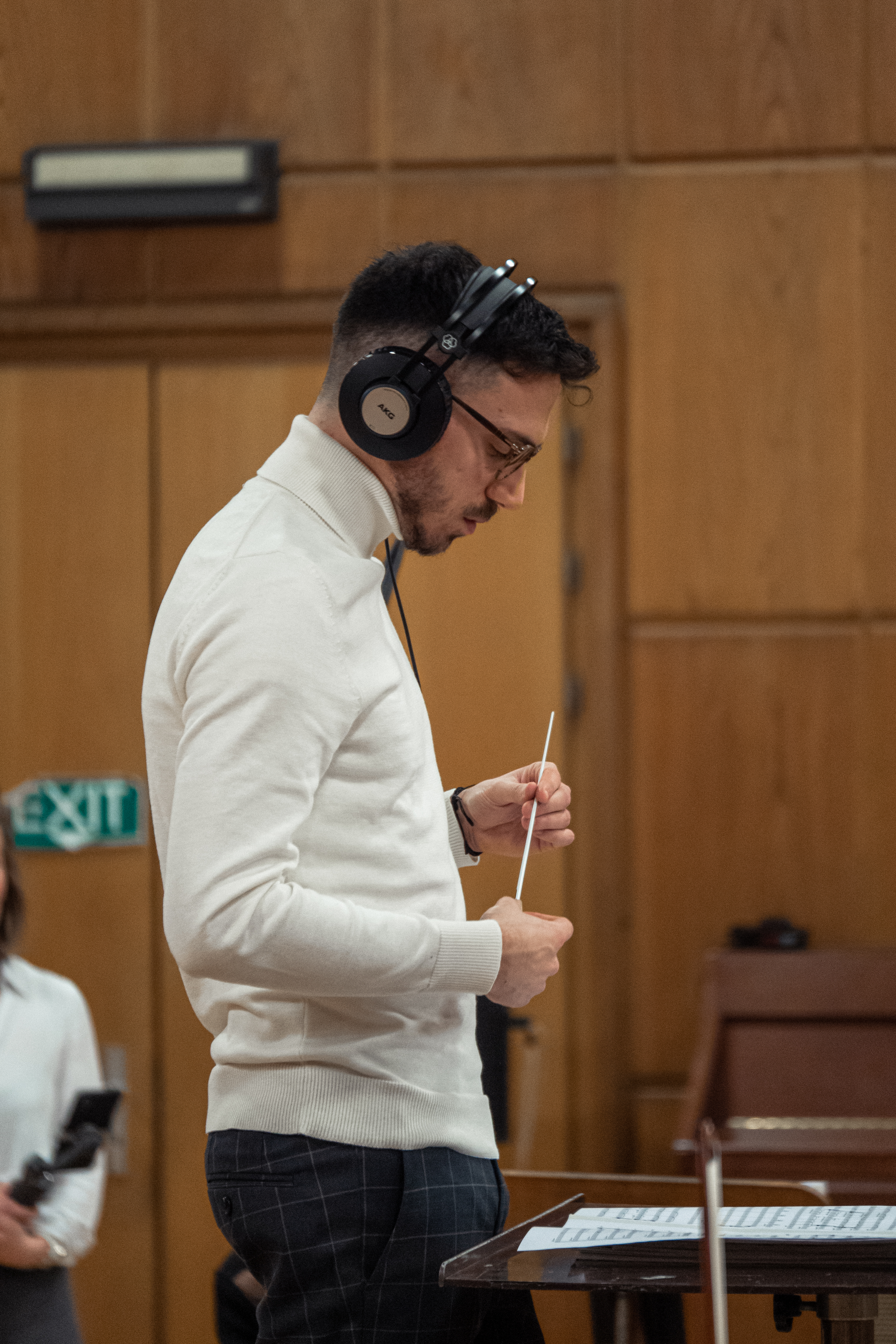
- Stefano D'Amico conducting European Recording Orchestra at BNR IN Sofia

Background information
- Born: Stefano D'Amico; February 3, 1996 (age 30); Turin, Italy
- Genres: Film music; Neoclassical
- Occupations: Composer, orchestrator, music producer, pianist
- Instruments: piano, keyboards
- Years active: 2015–present
- Labels: Believe Music, Strategic Sound Records
- Website: stefanodamico.com

Stefano D'Amico (born February 3, 1996, in Turin) is an Italian composer. He composes film music and neoclassical music.

== Early life and studies ==
At the age of 6 he moved to Cisternino, a small town in Apulia by the sea. He started studying piano when he was 11 and only a year later he entered ‘N. Rota’ Conservatoire, in Monopoli. He continued his studies with Francesco Buccarella. Some months later he wrote his first piano composition ‘Ora che noi’, which was performed at the year-end show and much appreciated. He then wrote other melodies which made him known to other musicians. In 2011 he became the keyboardist of an Apulian band with which he started to perform live and won a competition for new groups. Stefano is trained in film music, having graduated in Film and Game Scoring at Film Scoring Academy of Europe, an academy founded by Andy Hill. In 2023, he received a scholarship from composer Jan Andrzej Paweł Kaczmarek to pursue advanced studies always at the Film Scoring Academy of Europe. In 2024, he earned a Master of Fine Arts degree in Music for Motion Pictures and Contemporary Media. As he declared, James Newton Howard, Max Richter and Philip Glass have been his biggest inspiration since his early studies.

== Composer career ==
At the beginning of 2020, while composing 'Luce soffusa', he came up with the idea of the album 'Tribute to the Earth'. it wants to pay homage to the beauty of our planet, and raise awareness on important issues such as pollution and climate change. In March 2021, he has signed with Believe Music, with which he released 12 different singles between 2021 and 2023. In May 2024 he was hired to compose the music for the short film Lapis Amor, written and directed by Sebastian Storgaard On November 28th, 2024, he released his second album, which features the soundtracks from the short film Lapis Amor. This hybrid music album blends orchestral and electronic elements to emphasize the film's profound story.

== Discography ==
=== Singles ===
- I will not lose you (2015)
- Rain (2017)
- Liebe (2019)
- Revival (2020)
- April (2021)
- Stay here (2022)
- Broken Dream (2022)
- Wormhole (2022)
- Time to say goodbye (2023)
- Lonely night (2024)
- The last greeting (2024)

=== Studio albums ===
- Tribute to the Earth (2020)
- Lapis Amor (Original Motion Picture Soundtrack) (2024)
- Bliss (Original Motion Picture Soundtrack) (2026)

== Filmography ==
Title	Year	Director	Notes
Lapis Amor	2024	Sebastian Storgaard	Short film (Score composer)
Bliss	2025	Paulina Jaskiewicz	Short film (Score composer)
Lessons Unbound	2026	Michael Monteiro	Short film (Score composer)
