= Stefano Bellentani =

Italian consultant gastroenterologist, hepatologist and academic

- Born: Italy

Academic background
- Education: Degree in Medicine and Surgery; Ph.D. in Hepatological Sciences; Specialist in Gastroenterology and Endoscopy; Specialist in Science Nutrition; University of Modena

Academic work
- Institutions: University of Italian-speaking Switzerland
- Website: www.bellentani.doctor

Stefano Bellentani is an Italian consultant gastroenterologist, hepatologist, and academic. He is a Consultant Professor for Clinical Activity in Hepatology at the University of Italian-speaking Switzerland. Bellentani's research primarily focuses on liver diseases, particularly the impact of alcohol and metabolic factors on hepatic health.

== Education and career ==
Bellentani earned his degree in Medicine and Surgery in 1979, followed by a Ph.D. in Hepatological Sciences in 1988. He began his academic career in 1993 at the University of Modena and Reggio, where he held various positions. He served as a Lecturer in Dietetics and Nutrition from 1993 to 2012 and as a lecturer in Sport Therapy from 2003 to 2013. In 2013, he got the qualification of Full Professor of Gastroenterology by the Ministry of University and Scientific Research. He has extensive administrative and professional experience. From 1993 to 1997, he served as an Advisor to the Health Management Commission of the Modena Local Health Authority. From 1999 to 2004, he was President of the Municipal Council of Modena, overseeing governmental functions. From 2011 to 2015, he was Director and Vice President of the Italian Society of Gastroenterology. Moreover, he serves as a Consultant Professor for Clinical Activity in Hepatology at the University of Italian-speaking Switzerland.

== Clinical activity ==
From 1987 to 2015, he served as a Consultant Gastroenterologist for the Public Health System at Carpi and Baggiovara Hospitals. Later, between 2014 and 2015, he expanded his experience by working as a Locum Consultant Gastroenterologist in the Department of Gastroenterology at Shrewsbury and Telford Hospital NHS Trust, covering both Shrewsbury and Telford Hospitals in the UK. Following this, from 2015 to 2016, he took on a similar role at Frimley Park Hospital National Health Trust (UK), focusing on both gastroenterology and hepatology. Subsequently, from 2016 to 2019, he served as the Head of the Gastroenterology and Hepatology Service at Santa Chiara Clinic. In addition to this role, he practices as an Independent Gastroenterologist at his private medical clinic in Locarno, Switzerland, and also serves as a Consultant in Gastroenterology and Hepatology at Poliambulatorio Villa Richeldi in Carpi, Modena, Italy.
