= Stefano Rosso (singer-songwriter) =

Italian singer-songwriter (1948–2008)

- Born: Stefano Rossi; 7 December 1948; Rome, Italy
- Died: 15 September 2008 (aged 59) Rome, Italy
- Genre: Light rock
- Occupation: Singer-songwriter
- Instruments: Vocals; guitar
- Years active: 1969–2008
- Labels: Polydor Records Italia; RCA Italiana; Vedette; Ciao Records; Lupus
- Website: http://www.stefanorosso.org

Stefano Rosso (born Stefano Rossi; 7 December 1948 – 15 September 2008) was an Italian singer-songwriter and guitarist.

== Background ==
Born in Rome, Rosso debuted in 1969 with his brother in the duo "Romolo e Remo", with the song "Io vagabondo". Become a solo artist, he obtained his first commercial success with the 1976 song "Una storia disonesta". In 1980, he took part at the Sanremo Music Festival with the song "L'italiano". After a more difficult period, Rosso had returned to popularity in 2005 with the version of "Una storia disonesta", recorded by Tonino Carotone.

== Personal life ==
From Rosso's relationship with TG3 journalist Teresa Piazza, he was the father of the rapper Jesto. He also has a daughter, Stefania, from another relationship.

== Discography ==
Albums

- 1977 – Una storia disonesta (RCA Italiana, PL 31237)
- 1978 – ...e allora senti cosa fò (RCA Italiana, PL 31333)
- 1979 – Bioradiofotografie (RCA Italiana, PL 31450)
- 1980 – Io e il sig. Rosso (Ciao Records, 1002)
- 1981 – Vado, prendo l'America...e torno! (Lupus, LULP 14903)
- 1982 – Donne (Lupus, LULP 14912)
- 1983 – La chitarra fingerpicking di Stefano Rosso (Lupus, LULM 25004)
- 1985 – Stefano Rosso (Polydor, 825 768-1)
- 1989 – Femminando (Interbeat, 22924 6356-1)
- 1997 – Miracolo italiano (RCA/BMG, 74321 4 79772 3 )
- 2001 – Il meglio (Duck Records)
- 2003 – Fingerstyle Guitar (Red & Black Music, G 001)
- 2003 – Live at the Folk Studio (Red & Black Music, LIVE 001)
- 2003 – Live at the station (Red & Black Music, LIVE 002)
- 2004 – Banjoman (Red & Black Music, SG 001)
- 2006 – Lullaby of birdland (Red & Black Music, GT 002)
- 2007 – Mortacci (Red & Black Music, SG 002/0001)
- 2008 – Piccolo mondo antico (Red & Black Music)
