= Stefano Bosi =

Italian table tennis player

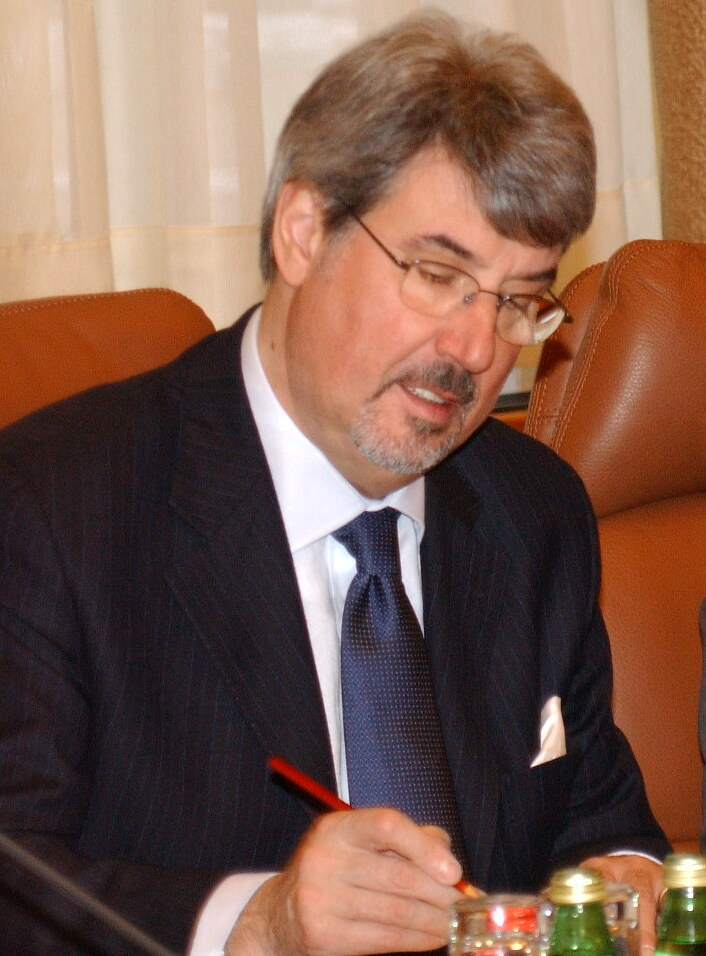

Personal information
- Born: September 14, 1954 (age 71) Florence, Italy

Sport
- Sport: Table tennis

President of the European Table Tennis Union (ETTU)
- Incumbent
- Assumed office 1996

President of the Italian Table Tennis Association (Fitet)
- In office 1990–2004

President of Cefas
- In office 1996–2010

Stefano Bosi (Florence, Italy 14 September 1954) is a former Italian table tennis player, and currently President of the European Table Tennis Union (ETTU). He is a candidate for presidency of the International Table Tennis Federation ITTF.

== Education ==
Bosi graduated at the ISEF (Superior Institute of Physical Education) in Florence, then graduated in Sports Science, at Tor Vergata University in Rome.

== Career as table tennis player ==
Bosi had 250 caps in the Italian Table Tennis National Team. 7-time winner of Italian men's senior title.

Knight Commander of the Italian Republic for sport activities and received the Italian Olympic Committee's “Stella d’Oro” in 1993. Bosi was President of Cefas, an institution taking care of youngsters’ and leisure sport activities promotion in the Province of Terni, from 1996 to 2010. He was President of the Italian Table Tennis Association (Fitet), from 1990 to 2004, and president of European Table Tennis Union (ETTU) since 1996.
