= Stefano Fusari =

Italian footballer

Personal information
- Date of birth: 14 July 1983 (age 43)
- Place of birth: Brescia, Italy
- Height: 1.79 m (5 ft 10 in)
- Position: Midfielder

Youth career
- Brescia

Senior career*
Years	Team	Apps	(Gls)
2004–2011	Montichiari	175	(1)
2011–2013	FeralpiSalò	21	(1)
2013–2014	Ciliverghe		
2014–2017	AC Rezzato		
2017–2018	Castiglione		
2018–2019	ASD Virtus Rodendo Saiano		
Total		195	(2)
- * Club domestic league appearances and goals

Stefano Fusari (born 14 July 1983) is an Italian former footballer who plays as a midfielder.

== Biography ==
Born in Brescia, Lombardy, Fusari started his career at hometown club Brescia Calcio. In January 2004 he left for Montichiari, which located within the Province of Brescia. He followed the team relegated to Serie D and promoted back to Seconda Divisione twice, in 2008 and 2010.

In 2011, he joined Prima Divisione newcomer FeralpiSalò.

== Honours ==
- Serie D: 2010
