= Stefano Caille =

French professional footballer (born 2000)

Personal information
- Date of birth: 18 May 2000 (age 26)
- Place of birth: Paris, France
- Height: 1.78 m (5 ft 10 in)
- Position: Midfielder

Team information
- Current team: Charleston Golden Eagles
- Number: 23

Youth career
- 2006–2008: Haÿ les Roses CA
- 2008–2013: Paris Saint-Germain
- 2013–2015: Montrouge FC 92
- 2015–2017: Tours

College career
Years	Team	Apps	(Gls)
2021–2022	Grand Canyon Antelopes		
2023–	Charleston Golden Eagles		

Senior career*
Years	Team	Apps	(Gls)
2016–2020	Tours II	8	(2)
2017–2020	Tours	4	(0)
2020–2021	Guadalajara		

International career^{‡}
2016–2017	France U16	5	(0)
- * Club domestic league appearances and goals as of 25 May 2019 ‡ National team caps and goals as of 14 October 2017

Stefano Caille (born 18 May 2000) is a French professional footballer who plays for American college team Charleston Golden Eagles as a midfielder.

== Professional career ==
Caille made his professional debut with Tours, in a 2–1 Ligue 2 loss to Stade Brestois on 29 September 2017, at the age of 17.
