= Stefano Stramigioli =

Italian scientist (born 1968)

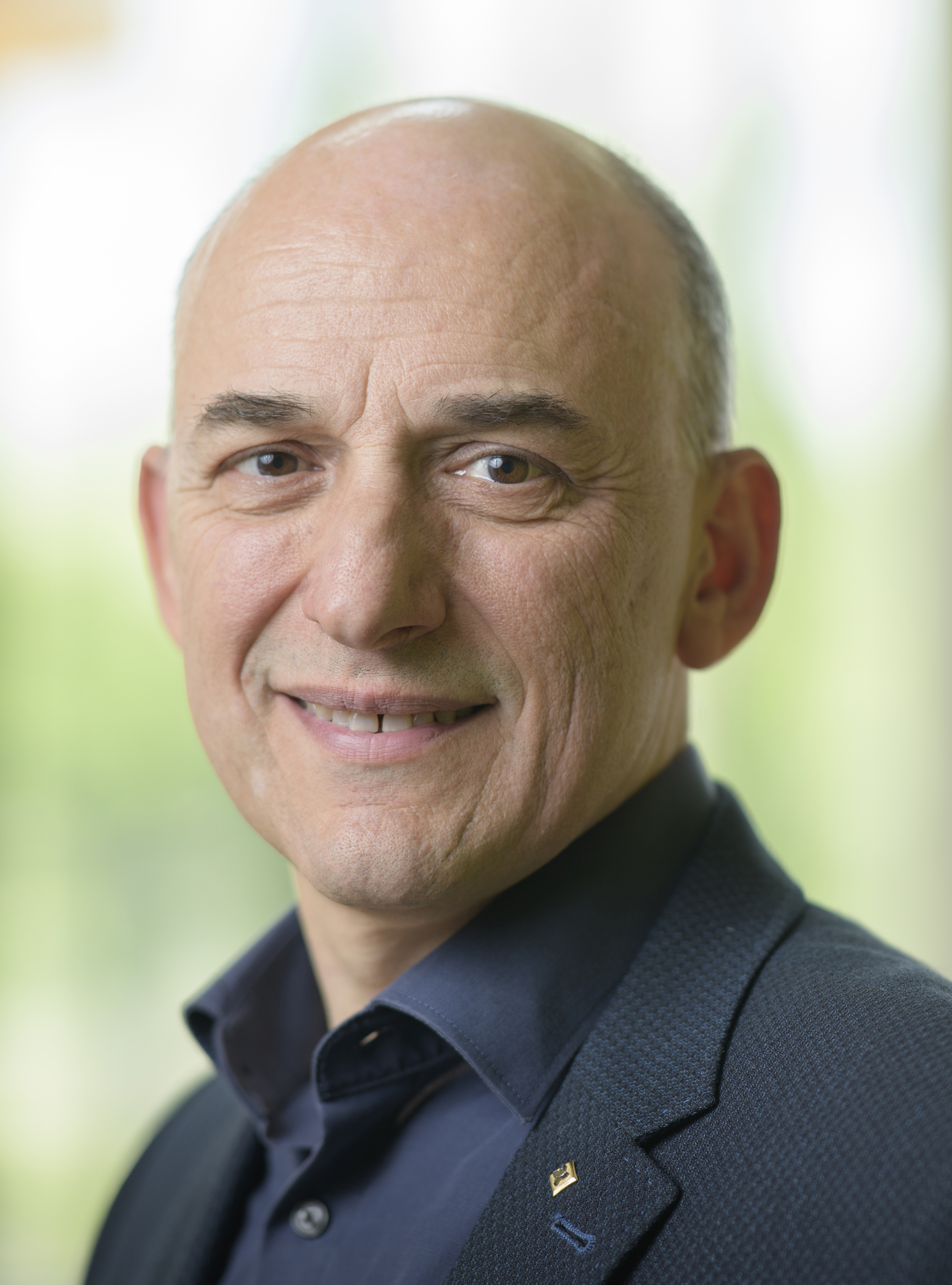
- Stramigioli in 2019
- Born: March 28, 1968; Bologna, Italy
- Education: University of Bologna
- Scientific career
- Fields: Robotics, system theory, control engineering, physical modelling
- Workplaces: Massachusetts Institute of Technology; University of Bologna; Delft University of Technology; University of Twente

Stefano Stramigioli is a scientist and engineer born in Italy and now living since 1992 in the Netherlands and holding both the Italian and Dutch nationality. He is affiliated with the University of Twente where he leads the Robotics And Mechatronics (RAM) Lab.

He has served as Vice President Research of euRobotics and ADRA. He was also the funder and chair of the first robotics center in the Netherland started in 2008, first called Romech and then LEO Center of Service Robotics.

He is a Fellow of the Institute of Electrical and Electronics Engineers (IEEE) since 2015 for contributions to modeling, control and realization of complex robotics systems and also a member of the Royal Holland Society of Science and Humanities (KHMW). He is recipient of the IEEE Robotics and Automation Distinguished Service Award and he is an ERC Advance Grant Laureate on the project PortWings.

== Early life ==
After obtaining a technical degree in computer science in 1987 and then a Laurea (cum laude) from the University of Bologna in 1992, he moved to the Netherlands for a research position at the University of Twente until 1994. He then moved to the Delft University of Technology to receive a Ph.D. (cum laude) in 1998. The dissertation has also been published as a Springer monograph. During the Ph.D., he was also a visiting scholar at the Massachusetts Institute of Technology in Cambridge, Massachusetts, US, in the lab of Prof. Neville Hogan, the pioneer of Impedance Control in Robotics. Right after his Ph.D., he was appointed as assistant professor and shortly after associate professor at the Control Laboratory of the Delft University of Technology. In 2001, he moved back to the University of Twente as an associate professor and became full professor in 2006 at the age of 38. Shortly after he moved back to the University of Twente, he set up and coordinated a unique EU-FP5 research project called GEOPLEX, Geometric Network Modeling and Control of Complex PhysicalSystems, who gathered all key players in port-Hamiltonian system theory and control and delivered in the years of the project fundamental contribution in the field. The final deliverable was the book Modeling and Control of Complex Physical Systems which is still the main reference for the field of port Hamiltonian System Theory and Control.

After a partial steering of the Control Group originally led by Prof. Job van Amerongen, in 2011 he took over complete leadership of the group which he grew to a Robotics Research Lab of more than 60 people focus on robotics and now called the Robotics And Mechatronics (RAM) Lab.

== Research ==
Stefano Stramigioli has contributed and has been active in the fields of control engineering, physical modelling, system theory and robotics. His research is characterised by the consistent use of energy-based techniques stemming from ideas of bond graphs and port-Hamiltonian system theory, originally introduces by Arjan van der Schaft and Bernhard Maschke who he brought and vastly used in the field of Robotics. Specific contributions can be found in the first use of Casimir functions for control, the Energy Router where also the idea of Energy Tanks was introduced for the first time, Sample Passivity and the Dual Architecture for tele-manipulation.

He introduced the term of Energy-Aware Robotics, rather than using the term passivity, because the term passivity is usually wrongly associated to a loss of performance in control, which is not the case. The main ideas related to Energy-Aware Robotics can be found in where also a fundamental theorem is introduced which shows the necessity of a concept called Control by Interconnection for any interactive Robotics systems. Another broader tutorial of topic related to this can be found in.. Lately he has been investigating the usage of new mathematical techniques developed during his ERC for the modeling of fundamental physics, including quantum field theory and general relativity.
