= 1998–99 Udinese Calcio season =

Udinese Calcio
1998–99 season
- Chairman: Giampaolo Pozzo
- Manager: Francesco Guidolin
- Serie A: 6th
- Coppa Italia: Quarter-finals
- Top goalscorer: Márcio Amoroso (22)

Udinese Calcio faded slightly compared to its record-breaking 1997–98 season, in which it finished third in Serie A. With top scorer Oliver Bierhoff, midfielder Thomas Helveg, and coach Alberto Zaccheroni all departing for Milan, Udinese appeared to be on the back foot prior to the start of the season.

Márcio Amoroso proved to be a worthy replacement for Bierhoff, scoring 22 goals after taking on increased responsibility. With this performance, Amoroso became the top scorer himself before departing for Parma, which paid a substantial sum for him.

The highlight of Udinese's season was qualifying for the 1999–2000 UEFA Cup, which was secured in a playoff against Juventus, as both clubs were tied on points for sixth place. Thanks to a goalless draw at home and Paolo Poggi's equalizer in Turin, Udinese clinched sixth place and the UEFA Cup slot.

== Squad ==
=== Goalkeepers ===
- (Italy) Luigi Turci
- (Netherlands) Harald Wapenaar

=== Defenders ===
- (Italy) Valerio Bertotto
- (Italy) Alessandro Calori
- (Ghana) Mohammed Gargo
- (Belgium) Régis Genaux
- (Argentina) Mauro Navas
- (Italy) Alessandro Pierini
- (Italy) Marco Zanchi

=== Midfielders ===
- (Ghana) Stephen Appiah
- (Italy) Jonathan Bachini
- (Denmark) Morten Bisgaard
- (Italy) Giuliano Giannichedda
- (Denmark) Martin Jørgensen
- (Italy) Tomas Locatelli
- (Netherlands) Eli Louhenapessy
- (Argentina) Mauricio Pineda
- (Belgium) Johan Walem
- (Netherlands) Henry van der Vegt

=== Attackers ===
- (Brazil) Márcio Amoroso
- (Egypt) Hazem Emam
- (Italy) Paolo Poggi
- (Argentina) Roberto Sosa
- (Sweden) Patrik Fredholm

== Competitions ==
=== Serie A ===
==== League table ====
Pos	Team	Pld	W	D	L	GF	GA	GD	Pts	Qualification or relegation
4	Parma	34	15	10	9	55	36	+19	55	Qualification to Champions League third qualifying round
5	Roma	34	15	9	10	69	49	+20	54 (Note: ROM 7pts. JUV 5pts. UDI 4pts.)	Qualification to UEFA Cup first round
6	Udinese (Note: Udinese gained entry to the 1999–2000 UEFA Cup winning the UEFA Cup qualification match against Juventus)	34	16	6	12	52	52	0	54	Qualification to UEFA Cup first round
7	Juventus (Note: Juventus qualified to the 1999 UEFA Intertoto Cup Third round.)	34	15	9	10	42	36	+6	54	Qualification to Intertoto Cup third round
8	Inter Milan	34	13	7	14	59	54	+5	46	

Source: Serie A, RSSSF.com, Soccerway
Rules for classification: 1) Points; 2) Head-to-head points; 3) Head-to-head goal difference; 4) Goal difference; 5) Goals scored; 6) Draw. (Note: Head-to-head record is used only after all the matches between the teams in question have been played).

==== Matches ====
12 September 1998 1	Udinese	2–2	Sampdoria	Udine
	Jonathan Bachini (15)Márcio Amoroso (42)	Report	Valerio Bertotto(32 og)Vincenzo Montella (37)	Stadium: Friuli

20 September 1998 2	Bologna	1–3	Udinese
	Kolyvanov 62'	Report	Amoroso 14'; Amoroso 44'pen Walem 85'

26 September 1998 3	Udinese	2–0	Salernitana	Udine
	Amoroso 4'; Amoroso 7'	Report		Stadium: Friuli

4 October 1998 4	Fiorentina	1–0	Udinese
	Edmundo 90'	Report

18 October 1998 5	Bari	1–1	Udinese
	Spinesi 90'	Report	Pierini 69'

25 October 1998 6	Udinese	1–1	Venezia	Udine
	Amoroso 37'pen	Report	Schwoch 56'	Stadium: Friuli

31 October 1998 7	Roma	4–0	Udinese
	Di Francesco 44'; Totti 52'; Paulo Sérgio 62'; Totti 71' (pen.)	Report

8 November 1998 8	Udinese	2–2	Juventus	Udine
	Bachini 65'; Roberto Sosa 90'	Report	Zidane 44'; Inzaghi 49'	Stadium: Friuli

15 November 1998 9	Parma	4–1	Udinese
	Crespo 4'; Crespo 37'; Crespo 65' (pen.); Stanic 88'	Report	Amoroso 36'

22 November 1998 10	Udinese	1–0	Piacenza	Udine
	Poggi 40'	Report		Stadium: Friuli

29 November 1998 11	Udinese	2–1	Cagliari	Udine
	Bachini 32'; Amoroso 64'	Report	De Patre 87'	Stadium: Friuli

6 December 1998 12	Milan	3–0	Udinese
	Weah 22'; Leonardo 40'; Bierhoff 61'	Report

13 December 1998 13	Udinese	0–1	Inter	Udine
		Report	Ronaldo 88'	Stadium: Friuli

20 December 1998 14	Lazio	3–1	Udinese
	Mancini 17'; Salas 55'; Salas 90'	Report	Locatelli 5'

6 January 1999 15	Udinese	2–1	Vicenza	Udine
	Ambrosetti 7'	Report	Roberto Sosa 43'; Amoroso 75'	Stadium: Friuli

10 January 1999 16	Perugia	1–3	Udinese
	Nakata 67'	Report	Pierini 20'; Matrecano 40'og Roberto Sosa 90'

17 January 1999 17	Udinese	0–0	Empoli	Udine
		Report		Stadium: Friuli

24 January 1999 18	Sampdoria	1–1	Udinese
	Ortega 53'pen	Report	Roberto Sosa 3'

31 January 1999 19	Udinese	2–0	Bologna	Udine
	Roberto Sosa 13'; Roberto Sosa 73'	Report		Stadium: Friuli

7 February 1999 20	Salernitana	1–2	Udinese
	Pierini 49'og	Report	Locatelli 38'; Amoroso 46'

14 February 1999 21	Udinese	1–0	Fiorentina	Udine
	Roberto Sosa 80'	Report		Stadium: Friuli

21 February 1999 22	Udinese	4–0	Bari	Udine
	Roberto Sosa 38'; Roberto Sosa 48'; Amoroso 64'; Bertotto 79'	Report		Stadium: Friuli

28 February 1999 23	Venezia	1–0	Udinese	Venice
	Recoba 83'pen	Report

7 March 1999 24	Udinese	2–1	Roma	Udine
	Jorgensen 84'; Amoroso 88'pen	Report	Fábio Júnior 28'	Stadium: Friuli

13 March 1999 25	Juventus	2–1	Udinese
	Fonseca 30'; Inzaghi 77'	Report	Roberto Sosa 47'

21 March 1999 26	Udinese	2–1	Parma	Udine
	Roberto Sosa 23'; Amoroso 89'	Report	Vanoli 77'	Stadium: Friuli

3 April 1999 27	Piacenza	4–3	Udinese
	Piovani 13'; S.Inzaghi 44'pen Vierchowod 62'	Report	Jorgensen 5'; Bachini 9'; Pierini 36'; Cristallini 71'

11 April 1999 28	Cagliari	1–2	Udinese
	Kallon 82'	Report	Jorgensen 44'; Walem 61'

18 April 1999 29	Udinese	1–5	Milan	Udine
	Amoroso 58'	Report	Boban 15'; Boban 37'; Bierhoff 45'; Bierhoff 60'; Weah 63'	Stadium: Friuli

25 April 1999 30	Inter	1–3	Udinese
	Zamorano 53'	Report	Amoroso 11'pen Amoroso 64'; Poggi 87'

2 May 1999 31	Udinese	0–3	Lazio	Udine
		Report	Mihajlovic 21'pen Vieri 49'; Mancini 58'	Stadium: Friuli

9 May 1999 32	Vicenza	2–3	Udinese
	Zauli 51'; Dicara 61'	Report	Amoroso 36'pen Amoroso 45'pen Walem 60'

16 May 1999 33	Udinese	1–2	Perugia	Udine
	Amoroso 63'pen	Report	Petrachi 26'; Petrachi 46'	Stadium: Friuli

23 May 1999 34	Empoli	1–3	Udinese	Empoli
	Zalayeta 22'	Report	Jorgensen 24'; Amoroso 53'; Amoroso 64'

=== UEFA Cup qualification ===
6th and 7th of Serie A:

28 May 1999	Udinese	0–0	Juventus	Udine
				Stadium: Friuli; Referee: Graziano Cesari

31 May 1999	Juventus	1–1 (1–1 a agg.)	Udinese	Turin
	Inzaghi 23' (pen.)		Poggi 71'	Stadium: Delle Alpi; Referee: Stefano Braschi

(Udinese therefore declared sixth in the league standings. Udinese qualified for the 1999–2000 UEFA Cup).

=== Top scorers ===
- (Brazil) Márcio Amoroso 22
- (Argentina) Roberto Sosa 10
- (Denmark) Martin Jørgensen 4

=== UEFA Cup ===
First round

15 September 1998	Udinese (Italy)	1–1	(Germany) Bayer Leverkusen	Udine
20:45 (CET)	Walem 82'	Report	Kirsten 10'	Stadium: Friuli; Attendance: 38,000; Referee: (Hungary) Sándor Piller

29 September 1998	Bayer Leverkusen (Germany)	1–0 (2–1 agg.)	(Italy) Udinese	Leverkusen
21:00 (CET)	Beinlich 77'	Report		Stadium: BayArena; Attendance: 22,500; Referee: (Spain) Arturo Daudén Ibáñez
