= 1997–98 Udinese Calcio season =

Udinese Calcio
1997–98 season
- Chairman: Giampaolo Pozzo
- Manager: Alberto Zaccheroni
- Serie A: 3rd
- UEFA Cup: Round of 32
- Coppa Italia: Round of 16
- Top goalscorer: League: Oliver Bierhoff (27); All: Oliver Bierhoff (31)

In the 1997-98 season, Udinese Calcio finished third in Serie A, part due to the performances of striker Oliver Bierhoff, who scored 27 league goals in 34 matches. The season was the team's highest final league position since the 1954-55 season.

Bierhoff coach Alberto Zaccheroni and winger Thomas Helveg left for Milan at the end of the season, ensuring Udinese had "much work" to do to maintain its level.

== Squad ==
Note: Flags indicate national team as defined under FIFA eligibility rules; some limited exceptions apply. Players may hold more than one non-FIFA nationality.

No.	Pos.	Nation	Player
1	GK	ITA	Luigi Turci
2	DF	DEN	Thomas Helveg
3	DF	ITA	Alessandro Orlando
4	DF	ITA	Valerio Bertotto
5	DF	ITA	Alessandro Calori
6	MF	BEL	Johan Walem
7	FW	BRA	Márcio Amoroso
8	DF	GHA	Mohammed Gargo
9	MF	EGY	Hazem Emam
10	MF	ITA	Tomas Locatelli
11	FW	ITA	Paolo Poggi
12	GK	ITA	Massimiliano Caniato
13	DF	BEL	Régis Genaux
15	DF	ITA	Marco Zanchi
16	MF	ITA	Giuliano Giannichedda

No.	Pos.	Nation	Player
17	GK	ITA	Alessandro Leopizzi
18	MF	MAR	Adil Ramzi
19	MF	DEN	Martin Jørgensen
20	FW	GER	Oliver Bierhoff
21	MF	ITA	Vito Lasalandra
22	DF	SEN	Joachim Fernandez
23	DF	ITA	Alessandro Pierini
24	DF	ITA	Giovanni Bia
25	DF	ITA	Gilberto D'Ignazio
26	MF	ITA	Jonathan Bachini
27	MF	ITA	Massimiliano Cappioli
22	GK	ITA	Giorgio Frezzolini
28	MF	ITA	Francesco Statuto
29	MF	GHA	Stephen Appiah
30	DF	ARG	Hector Pineda
31	GK	ITA	Raffaele Clemente
33	DF	ARG	Mauro Navas

=== Transfers ===
In
Pos.	Name	from	Type
DF	Gilberto D'Ignazio	Vicenza Calcio	
DF	Marco Zanchi	Chievo Verona	
MF	Adil Ramzi	Kawkab Marrakech	
MF	Martin Jørgensen	Aarhus GF	
MF	Johan Walem	Anderlecht	
MF	Jonathan Bachini	Lecce	loan ended
GK	Alessandro Leopizzi		

Out
Pos.	Name	To	Type
GK	Graziano Battistini	Hellas Verona	
MF	Raffaele Sergio	S.S.C. Napoli	
MF	Stefano Desideri	Livorno Calcio	
MF	Luca Compagnon	U.S. Cremonese	
MF	Marek Koźmiński	Brescia Calcio	
DF	Pier Luigi Nicoli	Padova Calcio	
DF	Fabio Pittilino	Lecce	

==== Winter ====
In
Pos.	Name	from	Type
GK	Giorgio Frezzolini	Internazionale	loan
MF	Francesco Statuto	A.S. Roma	
MF	Stephen Appiah	Hearts of Oak	
DF	Mauricio Pineda	Boca Juniors	
DF	Mauro Navas	Racing Club	
GK	Raffaele Clemente		

Out
Pos.	Name	To	Type
MF	Massimiliano Cappioli	Atalanta B.C.	
DF	Giovanni Bia	Brescia Calcio	
MF	Adil Ramzi	Willem II	
MF	Vito Lasalandra	Fidelis Andria	
DF	Joachim Fernandez	A.C. Monza	
GK	Massimiliano Caniato	Chievo Verona	

== Competitions ==
=== Serie A ===
==== League table ====
Pos	Team	Pld	W	D	L	GF	GA	GD	Pts	Qualification or relegation
1	Juventus (C)	34	21	11	2	67	28	+39	74	Qualification to Champions League group stage
2	Internazionale	34	21	6	7	62	27	+35	69	Qualification to Champions League second qualifying round
3	Udinese	34	19	7	8	62	40	+22	64	Qualification to UEFA Cup
4	Roma	34	16	11	7	67	42	+25	59	Qualification to UEFA Cup
5	Fiorentina	34	15	12	7	65	36	+29	57 (Note: Fiorentina finished ahead of Parma on head-to-head points: FIO 1–1 PAR; PAR 1–2 FIO.)	Qualification to UEFA Cup

Source: 1997–98 Serie A, RSSSF.com, Soccerway
Rules for classification: 1) Points; 2) Head-to-head points; 3) Head-to-head goal difference; 4) Goal difference; 5) Goals scored; 6) Draw. (Note: Head-to-head record is used only after all the matches between the teams in question have been played).
(C) Champions

==== Results by round ====
Round	1	2	3	4	5	6	7	8	9	10	11	12	13	14	15	16	17	18	19	20	21	22	23	24	25	26	27	28	29	30	31	32	33	34
Ground	H	A	H	A	H	A	H	A	H	A	A	H	A	H	A	H	A	A	H	A	H	A	H	A	H	A	H	H	A	H	A	H	A	H
Result	L	W	W	L	W	D	L	W	W	W	W	D	W	W	D	D	W	L	W	D	D	W	L	D	W	W	L	L	W	L	W	W	W	W
Position	11	9	6	9	5	6	8	7	4	3	3	3	3	2	3	3	3	3	3	3	4	4	4	5	4	4	4	4	4	4	4	3	3	3

Source: Competitive matches
A = Away; H = Home; W = Win; D = Draw; L = Loss; P = Postponed; = Leader, 1998–99 UEFA Champions League Group stage; = 1998–99 UEFA Champions League Second Qualifying round; = 1998–99 UEFA Cup First round; = 1998–99 Serie B

==== Matches ====
31 August 1997 1	Udinese	2–3	Fiorentina	Udine
	Amoroso 29'; Poggi 73'	Report	Batistuta 59'; Batistuta 89'; Batistuta 93'	Stadium: Stadio Friuli

13 September 1997 2	Lecce	1–2	Udinese	Lecco
	Francesco Palmieri (60)	Report	Jonathan Bachini (1)Tomas Locatelli (59)	Stadium: Via del Mare

21 September 1997 3	Udinese	2–1	Milan	Udine
	Oliver Bierhoff (25)Oliver Bierhoff (85)	Report	Patrick Kluivert (4)	Stadium: Stadio Friuli

27 September 1997 4	Parma	4–0	Udinese	Parma
	Hernán Crespo (32): 2–0 Néstor Sensini (83); 3–0 Filippo Maniero (86); 4–0 Pietro Strada (89 pen)	Report		Stadium: Il Tardini

5 October 1997 5	Udinese	3–2	Sampdoria	Udine
	Calori 8'; Bierhoff 35'; Pierini 47'	Report	Montella 26'; Boghossian 39'	Stadium: Friuli; Referee: Piero Ceccarini

18 October 1997 6	Udinese	2–2	Empoli
	Márcio Amoroso (29) Massimiliano Cappioli (85)	Report	Giovanni Martusciello (4) Alessandro Calori (35 og)

1 November 1997 7	Juventus	4–1	Udinese
	Antonio Conte (36): 2–1 Filippo Inzaghi (68); 3–1 Alessandro Del Piero (72 pen); 4–1 Nicola Amoruso (89)	Report	Tomas Locatelli (14)

9 November 1997 8	Udinese	2–0	Piacenza	Udine
	Paolo Poggi (45)Oliver Bierhoff (86 pen)	Report		Stadium: Stadio Friuli

23 November 1997 9	Brescia	0–4	Udinese
		Report	Oliver Bierhoff (55): 0–2 Paolo Poggi (83); 0–3 Oliver Bierhoff (90 + 2); 0–4 Johan Walem (90 + 4)

30 November 1997 10	Lazio	2–3	Udinese
	Diego Fuser (31)Paolo Negro (41)	Report	Paolo Poggi (32)Massimiliano Cappioli (73)Márcio Amoroso (84)

7 December 1997 11	Udinese	4–3	Bologna	Udine
	Oliver Bierhoff (13)Márcio Amoroso (36)Paolo Poggi (67) Oliver Bierhoff (81)	Report	Kennet Andersson (27)Carlo Nervo (42)Igor Kolyvanov (85)	Stadium: Friuli

14 December 1997 12	Bari	0–0	Udinese
		Report

21 December 1997 13	Udinese	1–0	Inter Milan	Udine
	Oliver Bierhoff (90 + 1)	Report		Stadium: Friuli

4 January 1998 14	Roma	1–2	Udinese
	Abel Balbo (59 pen)	Report	Oliver Bierhoff (49): 0–2 Oliver Bierhoff (56)

11 January 1998 15	Udinese	1–1	Napoli	Udine
	Bertrand Crasson (90 + 2 og)	Report	Claudio Bellucci (27)	Stadium: Friuli

18 January 1998 16	Atalanta	1–1	Udinese
	Fabio Gallo (9)	Report	Oliver Bierhoff (49)

25 January 1998 17	Udinese	3–0	Vicenza	Udine
	Oliver Bierhoff (20): 2–0 Oliver Bierhoff (37); 3–0 Tomas Locatelli (44)	Report		Stadium: Friuli

1 February 1998 18	Fiorentina	1–0	Udinese
	Luis Oliveira (75)	Report

8 February 1998 19	Udinese	6–0	Lecce	Udine
	Jean-Pierre Cyprien (21 og): 2–0 Oliver Bierhoff (38); 3–0 Oliver Bierhoff (48); 4–0 Paolo Poggi (58 pen); 5–0 Paolo Poggi (66); 6–0 Giuliano Giannichedda (89)	Report		Stadium: Friuli

11 February 1998 20	Milan	0–0	Udinese
		Report

15 February 1998 21	Udinese	1–1	Parma	Udine
	Oliver Bierhoff (80)	Report	Hernán Crespo (33)	Stadium: Friuli

22 February 1998 22	Sampdoria	0–3	Udinese
		Report	Martin Jørgensen (36): 0–2 Martin Jørgensen (60 pen); 0–3 Francesco Statuto (86)

1 March 1998 23	Empoli	1–0	Udinese
	Carmine Esposito (35 pen)	Report

8 March 1998 24	Udinese	1–1	Juventus	Udine
	Jonathan Bachini (76)	Report	Alessandro Del Piero (89)	Stadium: Friuli

15 March 1998 25	Piacenza	0–2	Udinese
		Report	Oliver Bierhoff (18 pen)Paolo Poggi (27)

22 March 1998 26	Udinese	3–1	Brescia	Udine
	Oliver Bierhoff (41): 2–0 Johan Walem (49) Aimo Diana (83 og)	Report	Ivan Javorčić (78)	Stadium: Friuli

28 March 1998 27	Udinese	0–2	Lazio	Udine
		Report	Roberto Mancini (33)Diego Fuser (57)	Stadium: Friuli

5 April 1998 28	Bologna	2–0	Udinese
	Igor Shalimov (1): 2–0 Igor Kolyvanov (4 pen)	Report

11 April 1998 29	Udinese	2–0	Bari	Udine
	Oliver Bierhoff (54): 2–0 Oliver Bierhoff (59)	Report		Stadium: Friuli

19 April 1998 30	Inter Milan	2–0	Udinese	Milan
	Youri Djorkaeff 80'; Ronaldo 85'	Report		Stadium: Giuseppe Meazza

26 April 1998 31	Udinese	4–2	Roma	Udine
	Bierhoff 23'; Calori 59'; Poggi 74'; Bierhoff 89'	Report	Totti 45'; Totti 73'	Stadium: Friuli

3 May 1998 32	Napoli	1–3	Udinese	Naples
	Turrini 12' (pen.)	Report	Poggi 4'; Bierhoff 45'; Bierhoff 87'	Stadium: Stadio San Paolo

10 May 1998 33	Udinese	1–0	Atalanta	Udine
	Calori 94'	Report		Stadium: Friuli

16 May 1998 34	Vicenza	1–3	Udinese	Vicenza
	Dicara 15'	Report	1' Amoroso; 31' Bierhoff; 38' Bierhoff

== Statistics ==
=== Players statistics ===
No.	Pos	Nat	Player	Total		1997–98 Serie A	
No.	Pos	Nat	Player	Apps	Goals	Apps	Goals
1	GK	(Italy) ITA	Turci	31	-33	31	-33
4	DF	(Italy) ITA	Bertotto	30	0	30	0
5	DF	(Italy) ITA	Calori	30	3	30	3
23	DF	(Italy) ITA	Pierini	32	1	32	1
2	MF	(Denmark) DEN	Helveg	28	0	26+2	0
6	MF	(Belgium) BEL	Walem	28	2	24+4	2
16	MF	(Italy) ITA	Giannichedda	30	1	30	1
26	MF	(Italy) ITA	Bachini	29	2	26+3	2
7	FW	(Brazil) BRA	Amoroso	25	5	22+3	5
20	FW	(Germany) GER	Bierhoff	32	27	31+1	27
11	FW	(Italy) ITA	Poggi	31	10	26+5	10
22	GK	(Italy) ITA	Frezzolini	2	-3	2	-3
10	MF	(Italy) ITA	Locatelli	28	3	13+15	3
19	MF	(Denmark) DEN	Jorgensen	21	2	11+10	2
28	MF	(Italy) ITA	Statuto	19	1	8+11	1
29	MF	(Ghana) GHA	Appiah	11	0	5+6	0
33	DF	(Argentina) ARG	Navas	10	0	5+5	0
30	DF	(Argentina) ARG	Pineda	8	-1	5+3	-1
27	MF	(Italy) ITA	Cappioli	10	2	4+6	2
15	DF	(Italy) ITA	Zanchi	7	0	3+4	0
24	DF	(Italy) ITA	Bia	3	0	3	0
25	DF	(Italy) ITA	D'Ignazio	6	0	2+4	0
13	DF	(Belgium) BEL	Genaux	6	0	2+4	0
9	MF	(Egypt) EGY	Emam	7	0	1+6	0
8	DF	(Ghana) GHA	Gargo	4	0	1+3	0
3	DF	(Italy) ITA	Orlando	2	0	0+2	0
12	GK	(Italy) ITA	Caniato	1	-3	1	-3
17	GK	(Italy) ITA	Leopizzi	0	0	0	0
18	MF	(Morocco) MAR	Ramzi	0	0	0	0
21	MF	(Italy) ITA	Lasalandra	1	0	0+1	0
22	DF	(Senegal) SEN	Fernandez	1	0	0+1	0
31	GK	(Italy) ITA	Clemente	0	0	0	0

- Source: http://calcio-seriea.net/presenze/1997/1140/

=== Topscorers ===
- (Germany) Oliver Bierhoff 27
- (Italy) Paolo Poggi 10
- (Brazil) Márcio Amoroso 5
- (Italy) Alessandro Calori 3
- (Italy) Tomas Locatelli 3

== Sources ==
- RSSSF – Italy 1997/98
