= 1996–97 Udinese Calcio season =

Udinese
1996–97 season
- President: Giampaolo Pozzo
- Manager: Alberto Zaccheroni
- Stadium: Stadio Friuli
- Serie A: 5th
- Coppa Italia: Second round
- Top goalscorer: Oliver Bierhoff; Paolo Poggi (13 goals)
Home colours	Away colours	Third colours

In the 1996–97 season, Udinese Calcio had its best season since the days of Zico during the 1980s. With goal-scoring trio Oliver Bierhoff, Márcio Amoroso and Paolo Poggi on top form, Udinese finished fifth. Bierhoff and Poggi scored 13 goals each, while Amoroso scored 12.

== Players ==
=== First-team squad ===
Note: Flags indicate national team as defined under FIFA eligibility rules; some limited exceptions apply. Players may hold more than one non-FIFA nationality.

No.	Pos.	Nation	Player
1	GK	ITA	Graziano Battistini
2	DF	DEN	Thomas Helveg
3	DF	ITA	Raffaele Sergio
4	MF	ITA	Fabio Rossitto
5	DF	ITA	Alessandro Calori
6	MF	ITA	David Stefani
7	FW	BRA	Márcio Amoroso
8	DF	GHA	Mohammed Gargo
9	FW	ITA	Claudio Clementi
10	MF	ITA	Giovanni Stroppa
11	FW	ITA	Paolo Poggi
12	GK	ITA	Massimiliano Caniato
13	DF	ITA	Valerio Bertotto
14	MF	ITA	Stefano Desideri
15	DF	ITA	Luca Compagnon

No.	Pos.	Nation	Player
16	MF	ITA	Giuliano Giannichedda
17	DF	ITA	Stefano Pellegrini
18	MF	ITA	Andrea Chiopris Gori
20	FW	GER	Oliver Bierhoff
21	DF	ITA	Alessandro Orlando
22	GK	ITA	Luigi Turci
23	DF	ITA	Alessandro Pierini
24	DF	ITA	Giovanni Bia
25	DF	POL	Marek Koźmiński
26	DF	SUI	Pier Luigi Nicoli
27	MF	ITA	Massimiliano Cappioli
29	MF	ITA	Tomas Locatelli
30	DF	BEL	Régis Genaux
31	MF	EGY	Hazem Emam
32	DF	SUI	Fabio Pittilino

=== Transfers ===
In
Pos.	Name	From	Type
FW	Marcio Amoroso	Flamengo	
GK	Luigi Turci	Cremonese	
MF	Hazem Emam	Zamalek	
MF	Massimiliano Cappioli	Roma	
MF	Tomas Locatelli	Milan	
DF	Regis Genaux	Coventry City	

Out
Pos.	Name	To	Type
FW	Stefano Borgonovo		Retired
MF	Igor Shalimov	Bologna	
FW	Francesco Marino	Reggina	
MF	Raffaele Ametrano	Juventus	
GK	Attilio Gregori	Hellas Verona	
MF	Jonathan Bachini	Lecce	Loan
MF	David Stefani	Savoia	Loan
DF	Stefano Pellegrini	Carpi	Loan

== Competitions ==
=== Serie A ===
==== League table ====
Pos	Team	Pld	W	D	L	GF	GA	GD	Pts	Qualification or relegation
3	Internazionale	34	15	14	5	51	35	+16	59	Qualification to UEFA Cup
4	Lazio	34	15	10	9	54	37	+17	55	Qualification to UEFA Cup
5	Udinese	34	15	9	10	53	41	+12	54	Qualification to UEFA Cup
6	Sampdoria	34	14	11	9	60	46	+14	53	Qualification to UEFA Cup
7	Bologna	34	13	10	11	50	44	+6	49	

Source: Serie A, RSSSF.com, Soccerway
Rules for classification: 1) Points; 2) Head-to-head points; 3) Head-to-head goal difference; 4) Goal difference; 5) Goals scored; 6) Draw. (Note: Head-to-head record is used only after all the matches between the teams in question have been played).

==== Position by round ====
Round	1	2	3	4	5	6	7	8	9	10	11	12	13	14	15	16	17	18	19	20	21	22	23	24	25	26	27	28	29	30	31	32	33	34
Ground	H	A	H	A	H	A	H	A	A	H	A	H	A	H	H	A	H	A	H	A	H	A	H	A	H	H	A	H	A	H	A	A	H	A
Result	L	W	W	D	D	D	L	W	L	W	L	L	W	L	L	D	W	D	L	W	D	D	L	W	D	W	W	W	D	W	W	L	W	W
Position	13	11	9	7	8	9	13	8	11	12	11	13	11	12	13	13	13	13	13	13	13	13	13	12	12	12	7	7	8	7	5	7	6	5

Source: Competitive matches
A = Away; H = Home; W = Win; D = Draw; L = Loss; P = Postponed; = Leader, 1997–98 UEFA Champions League group stage; = 1997–98 UEFA Champions League second qualifying round; = 1997–98 UEFA Cup first round; = 1997–98 Serie B

==== Matches ====
7 September 1996 1	Udinese	0–1	Inter	Udine
		Report	10' Sforza	Stadium: Friuli

15 September 1996 2	Lazio	0–1	Udinese	Rome
		Report	Bia 73' (pen.)	Stadium: Olimpico

22 September 1996 3	Cagliari	1–2	Udinese	Cagliari
	Bia 19' (o.g.)	Report	9' Poggi; 23' Bierhoff	Stadium: Stadio Sant'Elia

29 September 1996 4	Udinese	2–2	Bologna	Udine
	Bia 5'; Bierhoff 16'	Report	Marocchi 39'; Nervo 86'	Stadium: Friuli

13 October 1996 5	Napoli	1–1	Udinese	Naples
	Pecchia 59'	Report	76' Bierhoff	Stadium: San Paolo

20 October 1996 6	Udinese	1–1	Vicenza	Udine
	Poggi 71'	Report	89' Maini	Stadium: Friuli

27 October 1996 7	Perugia	2–1	Udinese	Perugia
	Allegri 42'; Negri 70'	Report	Poggi 6'

3 November 1996 8	Udinese	2–1	Reggiana	Udine
	Bierhoff 48'; Poggi 88'	Report	64' Valencia	Stadium: Friuli

17 November 1996 9	Atalanta	1–0	Udinese	Bergamo
	Bertotto 29' (o.g.)	Report		Stadium: Atleti Azzurri D'Italia

1 December 1996 11	Udinese	3–1	Parma	Udine
	Apolloni 65' (o.g.); Bierhoff 81', 90'	Report	40'Zé Maria	Stadium: Friuli

8 December 1996 12	Milan	2–1	Udinese	Milan
	Savićević 52'; Eranio 61'	Report	56' Stroppa	Stadium: San Siro

11 December 1996 10	Udinese	1–4	Juventus	Udine
	Cappioli 54'	Report	Bokšić 21'; Del Piero 39' (pen.), 44' (pen.); Deschamps 70'	Stadium: Friuli
Note: Rescheduled from 24 November 1996 due to Juventus's participation in the 1996 Intercontinental Cup.

15 December 1996 13	Udinese	2–0	Fiorentina	Udine
	Amoroso 19', 29'	Report		Stadium: Friuli

22 December 1996 14	Verona	3–2	Udinese	Verona
	Maniero 47', 90'; Orlandini 62' (pen.)	Report	19' Poggi; 52' Stroppa	Stadium: Marcantonio Bentegodi

5 January 1997 15	Udinese	4–5	Sampdoria	Udine
	Amoroso 33', 62'; Cappioli 44'; Bia 90' (pen.)	Report	Mancini 5', 19', 33'; Montella 11', 74'	Stadium: Friuli

12 January 1997 16	Piacenza	0–0	Udinese	Piacenza
		Report		Stadium: Galleana

19 January 1997 17	Udinese	1–0	Fiorentina	Udine
	Poggi 90'	Report		Stadium: Friuli

26 January 1997 18	Inter	1–1	Udinese	Milan
	Djorkaeff 62' (pen.)	Report	12' Poggi	Stadium: San Siro

2 February 1997 19	Udinese	2–3	Lazio	Udine
	Amoroso 79' (pen.), 90'	Report	Signori 17', 61'; Nedvěd 88'	Stadium: Friuli

16 February 1997 20	Udinese	1–0	Cagliari	Udine
	Bierhoff 76'	Report		Stadium: Friuli

23 February 1997 21	Bologna	0–0	Udinese	Bologna
		Report		Stadium: Renato Dall'Ara

2 March 1997 22	Udinese	2–2	Napoli	Udine
	Poggi 9', 76'	Report	26' (o.g.) Pecchia; 46' (o.g.)Helveg	Stadium: Friuli

9 March 1997 23	Vicenza	2–0	Udinese	Vicenza
	Maini 37'; Murgita 50'	Report		Stadium: Romeo Menti

16 March 1997 24	Udinese	2–1	Perugia	Udine
	Amoroso 22'; Helveg 76'	Report	Negri 3'	Stadium: Friuli

23 March 1997 25	Reggiana	0–0	Udinese	Reggio Emilia
		Report		Stadium: Giglio; Referee: Pierpaolo Rossi

6 April 1997 26	Udinese	2–0	Atalanta	Udine
	Bierhoff 81'; Amoroso 84'	Report		Stadium: Friuli

13 April 1997 27	Juventus	0–3	Udinese	Turin
	Vieri (penalty missed) 56'; Tacchinardi (yellow card) 60' (yellow-red card); Zidane (penalty missed) 64'	Report	Genaux (red card) 3'; Amoroso 42' (pen.), 49'; Bierhoff 47'	Stadium: Delle Alpi
Note: Udinese Goalkeeper Luigi Turci saved Zinedine Zidane's penalty kick at 64'.

20 April 1997 28	Parma	0–2	Udinese	Parma
		Report	Pierini 67'; Del Piero 87' (pen.)	Stadium: Ennio Tardini

4 May 1997 29	Udinese	1–1	Milan	Udine
	Bierhoff 16'	Report	72' Maldini	Stadium: Friuli

11 May 1997 30	Fiorentina	2–3	Udinese	Florence
	Padalino 5'; Baiano 21'	Report	2', 60' (pen.) Amoroso; 82' Pierini	Stadium: Artemio Franchi

15 May 1997 31	Udinese	3–0	Verona	Udine
	Poggi 33' (pen.), 50'; Bierhoff 84'	Report		Stadium: Friuli

18 May 1997 32	Sampdoria	4–0	Udinese	Genoa
	Verón 40'; Laigle 63'; Montella 65' (pen.), 90' (pen.)	Report		Stadium: Luigi Ferraris

25 May 1997 33	Udinese	4–0	Piacenza	Udine
	Sergio 13'; Scienza 18' (o.g.); Poggi 45'; Cappioli 85'	Report		Stadium: Friuli

1 June 1997 34	Roma	0–3	Udinese	Rome
		Report	Poggi 42'; Bierhoff 45'; Bia 87'	Stadium: Olimpico

=== Coppa Italia ===
==== Second round ====
28 August 1996	Cremonese	2–1	Udinese	Cremona
	Aloisi 35'; Maspero 49' (pen.)		3' Poggi	Stadium: Stadio Giovanni Zini; Referee: Pairetto

== Statistics ==
=== Players statistics ===
No.	Pos	Nat	Player	Total		1996–97 Serie A		1996–97 Coppa Italia	
No.	Pos	Nat	Player	Apps	Goals	Apps	Goals	Apps	Goals
22	GK	(Italy) ITA	Turci	20	0	20	0		
5	DF	(Italy) ITA	Calori	32	0	29+2	0	1	0
23	DF	(Italy) ITA	Pierini	24	2	19+4	2	1	0
24	DF	(Italy) ITA	Bia	23	4	21+2	4		
2	MF	(Denmark) DEN	Helveg	31	1	30+1	1		
4	MF	(Italy) ITA	Rossitto	32	0	31	0	1	0
16	MF	(Italy) ITA	Giannichedda	24	0	12+11	0	0+1	0
3	MF	(Italy) ITA	Sergio	29	1	25+3	1	1	0
7	FW	(Brazil) BRA	Amoroso	29	12	22+6	12	1	0
20	FW	(Germany) GER	Bierhoff	24	13	22+1	13	1	0
11	FW	(Italy) ITA	Poggi	33	13	30+2	13	1	0
1	GK	(Italy) ITA	Battistini	11	0	10	0	0+1	0
13	DF	(Italy) ITA	Bertotto	25	0	19+5	0	1	0
14	MF	(Italy) ITA	Desideri	20	0	19	0	1	0
21	DF	(Italy) ITA	Orlando	22	0	17+5	0		
10	MF	(Italy) ITA	Stroppa	15	0	12+2	0	1	0
27	MF	(Italy) ITA	Cappioli	21	3	8+13	3		
8	DF	(Ghana) GHA	Gargo	18	0	7+11	0		
26	DF	(Switzerland) SUI	Nicoli	10	0	7+3	0		
29	MF	(Italy) ITA	Locatelli	12	0	5+7	0		
30	DF	(Belgium) BEL	Genaux	8	0	4+4	0		
12	GK	(Italy) ITA	Caniato	6	0	4+1	0	1	0
9	FW	(Italy) ITA	Clementi	7	0	1+6	0		
31	MF	(Egypt) EGY	Emam	5	0	0+4	0	0+1	0
17	DF	(Italy) ITA	Pellegrini	2	0	0+2	0		
15	DF	(Italy) ITA	Compagnon	1	0	0+1	0		
6	MF	(Italy) ITA	Stefani	1	0	0+1	0		
25	DF	(Poland) POL	Kozminski	1	0	0+1	0		
18	MF	(Italy) ITA	Gori						
32	DF	(Switzerland) SUI	Pittilino						

- Source: http://calcio-seriea.net/formazioni/1996/1122/

=== Top scorers ===
- (Germany) Oliver Bierhoff 13
- (Italy) Paolo Poggi 13
- (Brazil) Márcio Amoroso 12
- (Italy) Giovanni Bia 4
- (Italy) Massimiliano Cappioli 3

== Sources ==
- RSSSF – Italy 1996/97
