= Martin Jørgensen =

Danish footballer (born 1975)

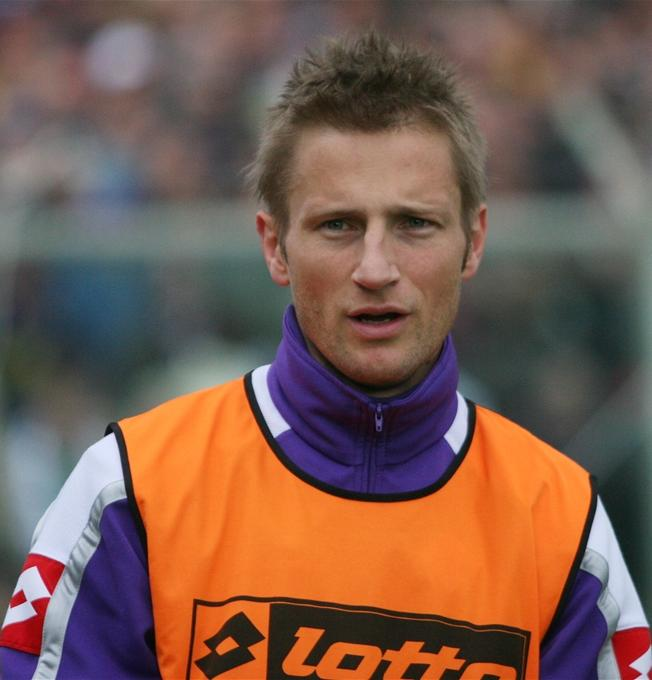
- Jorgensen with Fiorentina in 2007

Personal information
- Full name: Lars Martin Jørgensen
- Date of birth: 6 October 1975 (age 51)
- Place of birth: Ryomgård, Denmark
- Height: 1.80 m (5 ft 11 in)
- Position: Midfielder

Team information
- Current team: AGF (scout)

Youth career
- 1979–1988: IF Midtdjurs
- 1989–1993: AGF

Senior career*
Years	Team	Apps	(Gls)
1994–1997	AGF	82	(13)
1997–2004	Udinese	185	(30)
2004–2010	Fiorentina	151	(14)
2010–2014	AGF	102	(14)

International career
1991–1992	Denmark U17	11	(1)
1992–1994	Denmark U19	10	(3)
1994–1997	Denmark U21	31	(9)
1998–2011	Denmark	102	(12)

Managerial career
- 2014: AGF (assistant)
- 2015: AGF U14
- 2015–: AGF (scout)
- 2015–2016: Denmark (assistant)
- * Club domestic league appearances and goals

Lars Martin Jørgensen (Danish pronunciation: [ˈlɑːs ˈmɑːtsʰin ˈjɶɐ̯ˀnsn̩]; born 6 October 1975) is a Danish former professional footballer who currently works as a scout for AGF. Starting his career as a full-back, Jørgensen eventually spent most of it in midfield. In his 20-year playing career, he played for AGF in his homeland, as well as Italian clubs Udinese and Fiorentina.

Jørgensen amassed 102 caps and scored 12 goals for the Denmark national team. He has represented Denmark at three FIFA World Cups and two European Championships. After Denmark's elimination from the 2010 FIFA World Cup in South Africa, he announced his international retirement. His farewell match was played in November 2010. However, Jørgensen returned to play a Euro 2012 qualifier against Norway on 6 September 2011.

He is the older brother of retired Danish football player Mads Jørgensen.

== Club career ==
Born in Ryomgård on Djursland, he began his club career at the local club IF Midtdjurs. Jørgensen moved to AGF as a youngster in 1989, where his footballing talent was recognized as he was chosen to represent various Danish youth national teams from 1991 onward. He made his senior debut for AGF on 8 May 1994 in a match against Silkeborg IF, and was a part of the team that won the 1996 Danish Cup trophy. Jørgensen's contract with AGF had a release clause, permitting him to leave the club on a free transfer in April 1997. He moved to Italy to play alongside fellow Dane Thomas Helveg at Udinese in Serie A. He helped Udinese finish third in the 1997–98 season. After spending seven years at Udinese, Jørgensen moved to league rivals Fiorentina in August 2004, when the club bought half of Jørgensen's transfer fee rights. He proved to be a key asset to Fiorentina's offensive play and became beloved by the fans. As an attacking midfielder, he played close to the two strikers and during the 2007–08 season he also served as a right back for the majority of the season. He had important contributions for Fiorentina during that season, scoring two goals in the UEFA Cup fixture against IF Elfsborg, and being a key part of the 3–2 win over Juventus on 2 March 2008.

Jørgensen's 2008–09 season was plagued by an early onset of muscular injuries that left him out of the team until February 2009. He stated that once his time in Florence finished he would like to return to Aarhus before retiring. Despite a difficult season, he signed a contract extension to remain part of Fiorentina until June 2010. Jørgensen scored a crucial 90th-minute equalizer against Lecce which secured Fiorentina the fourth and final Champions League slot.

On 9 December 2009, Jørgensen scored the first goal in Fiorentina's 2–1 win over Liverpool at Anfield, his first career goal in the Champions League, after receiving a through-pass from Alberto Gilardino on a counterattack. Fiorentina claimed top spot in the group with this win, having already eliminated Liverpool a fortnight prior. On the second last day of the transfer window, 31 January 2010, Jørgensen returned to his childhood club, Danish AGF for an undisclosed fee. At that point he had six months contract left with La viola.

On 11 November 2014, Jørgensen announced his decision to retire from football by the end of 2014.

== International career ==
Jørgensen was a prolific player for the various Danish youth teams. He was named 1996 Danish under-21 Player of the Year, and eventually set a record of 31 games for the Danish under-21 national team, scoring nine goals.

He made his debut for the senior Denmark national team on 25 March 1998 against Scotland, under national team coach Bo Johansson. He was chosen to represent Denmark at the 1998 FIFA World Cup, where he got his international breakthrough. He took part in all five Denmark matches at the tournament and scored the opening goal in the 3–2 quarter-final defeat to eventual runners-up Brazil.

Jørgensen was called up by Johansson to compete for Denmark at the 2000 European Championship, despite being injured. The tournament was no success for Jørgensen, who played a single game as Denmark were eliminated in the preliminary group stage. He made his second World Cup appearance, under new coach Morten Olsen, at the 2002 FIFA World Cup. He played in Denmark's three group stage matches, before suffering an injury which kept him from playing the second round where Denmark were eliminated. At the 2004 European Championship, Jørgensen played in all Denmark's four matches before elimination.

== Coaching career ==
In late 2014, Jørgensen was hired as assistant manager at AGF, a position he held for six months. He continued as player without any coaching role until the year following, where he retired as a player. He then became coach of the U14 team in January 2015.

One month after his appointment as U14 coach at AGF, he was also hired as the assistant manager of the Danish national team. In the summer of 2015, however, his role at AGF changed from U14 coach to scout, while he continued as assistant manager in the national team. He left the post as assistant manager in January 2016.

== Career statistics ==
=== Club ===
Appearances and goals by club, season and competition
Club	Season	League			Cup		Continental		Total	
Club	Season	Division	Apps	Goals	Apps	Goals	Apps	Goals	Apps	Goals
AGF	1993–94	Superliga	6	2			—		6	2
AGF	1994–95	Superliga	21	4			—		21	4
AGF	1995–96	Superliga	25	1			4 (Note: Appearances in UEFA Intertoto Cup)	1	29	2
AGF	1996–97	Superliga	30	6			2 (Note: Appearances in UEFA Cup Winners' Cup)	0	32	6
AGF	Total		82	13			6	1	88	14
Udinese	1997–98	Serie A	20	2	—		1 (Note: Appearances in UEFA Cup / UEFA Europa League)	0	21	2
Udinese	1998–99	Serie A	28	4	2	0	2	0	32	4
Udinese	1999–2000	Serie A	30	7	—		8	0	38	7
Udinese	2000–01	Serie A	27	4	—		3	0	30	4
Udinese	2001–02	Serie A	19	6	1	1	—		20	7
Udinese	2002–03	Serie A	27	4	—		—		27	4
Udinese	2003–04	Serie A	34	3	1	0	2	0	37	3
Udinese	Total		185	30	4	1	16	0	205	31
Fiorentina	2004–05	Serie A	30	3	3	0	—		33	3
Fiorentina	2005–06	Serie A	37	7	1	0	—		38	7
Fiorentina	2006–07	Serie A	35	3	—		—		35	3
Fiorentina	2007–08	Serie A	26	0	3	0	11	2	40	2
Fiorentina	2008–09	Serie A	10	1	—		3 (Note: Two appearances in UEFA Champions League, one appearance in UEFA Cup)	0	13	1
Fiorentina	2009–10	Serie A	13	0	—		5 (Note: Appearances in UEFA Champions League)	1	18	1
Fiorentina	Total		151	14	7	0	19	3	177	17
AGF	2009–10	Superliga	13	0	—		—		13	0
AGF	2010–11	1st Division	24	2	2	0	—		26	2
AGF	2011–12	Superliga	32	5	1	0	—		33	5
AGF	2012–13	Superliga	14	1	2	1	2	0	18	2
AGF	2013–14	Superliga	17	0	2	0	—		19	0
AGF	2014–15	1st Division	12	1	—		—		12	1
AGF	Total		112	9	7	1	2	0	121	10
Career total			530	66	18	2	43	4	591	72

=== International ===
Appearances and goals by national team and year
National team	Year	Apps	Goals
Denmark	1998	12	1
Denmark	1999	10	2
Denmark	2000	3	0
Denmark	2001	6	1
Denmark	2002	6	0
Denmark	2003	9	3
Denmark	2004	12	3
Denmark	2005	10	1
Denmark	2006	8	1
Denmark	2007	6	0
Denmark	2008	3	0
Denmark	2009	8	0
Denmark	2010	6	0
Denmark	2011	3	0
Total		102	12

Scores and results list Denmark's goal tally first, score column indicates score after each Jørgensen goal.

List of international goals scored by Martin Jørgensen
No.	Date	Venue	Opponent	Score	Result	Competition
1	3 July 1998	Stade de la Beaujoire, Nantes, France	Brazil	1–0	2–3	1998 FIFA World Cup
2	8 September 1999	Stadio San Paolo, Naples, Italy	Italy	1–2	3–2	UEFA Euro 2000 qualification
3	13 November 1999	Ramat Gan Stadium, Ramat Gan, Israel	Israel	4–0	5–0	UEFA Euro 2000 qualification
4	10 November 2001	Parken Stadium, Copenhagen, Denmark	Netherlands	1–1	1–1	Friendly
5	11 October 2003	Koševo Stadium, Sarajevo, Bosnia and Herzegovina	Bosnia and Herzegovina	1–0	1–1	UEFA Euro 2004 qualification
6	16 November 2003	Old Trafford, Manchester, England	England	1–1	3–2	Friendly
7	16 November 2003	Old Trafford, Manchester, England	England	2–2	3–2	Friendly
8	18 February 2004	Adana 5 Ocak Stadium, Adana, Turkey	Turkey	1–0	1–0	Friendly
9	4 September 2004	Parken Stadium, Copenhagen, Denmark	Ukraine	1–0	1–1	2006 FIFA World Cup qualification
10	9 October 2004	Qemal Stafa Stadium, Tirana, Albania	Albania	1–0	2–0	2006 FIFA World Cup qualification
11	8 June 2005	Parken Stadium, Copenhagen, Denmark	Albania	3–0	3–1	2006 FIFA World Cup qualification
12	1 September 2006	Brøndby Stadium, Brøndbyvester, Denmark	Portugal	3–2	4–2	Friendly

== Honours ==
AGF

- Danish Cup: 1995–96

Individual

- Danish under-21 Player of the Year: 1996

== See also ==
- List of men's footballers with 100 or more international caps
