= 2005–06 ACF Fiorentina season =

Fiorentina
2005–06 season
- President: Andrea Della Valle
- Manager: Cesare Prandelli
- Stadium: Stadio Artemio Franchi
- Serie A: 9th (originally 4th)
- Coppa Italia: Round of 16
- Top goalscorer: League: Luca Toni (31); All: Luca Toni (33)
- Average home league attendance: 33,044
Home colours	Away colours	Third colours

The 2005–06 season was ACF Fiorentina's 80th season in its history and its 68th season in Serie A. The club had its best season on the pitch since the 1998–99 season, originally finishing 4th with 74 points and securing a spot in the qualifying round of the 2006–07 UEFA Champions League. However, the club was punished with a 30-point penalty for its involvement in the 2006 Italian football scandal, resulting in Fiorentina being pushed down the table to 9th. This was a much better outcome than its original punishment, as La Viola were originally relegated to Serie B. Following a successful appeal, Fiorentina was admitted to play in Serie A the following season, albeit losing its Champions League slot and having to start the season with a 15-point penalty, removing any chance of mounting a genuine title challenge and building on the success of the 2005–06 season.

The most significant player during the season was new striker Luca Toni, signed from Palermo in the summer, who netted almost one goal per match on average over the full season, winning the topscoring battle of Serie A with 31 strikes, which was a near-record. New goalkeeper Sébastien Frey was also impressive, conceding 41 goals only due to a weak defence.

== Players ==
=== Goalkeepers ===
- (France) Sébastien Frey
- (Argentina) Sebastián Cejas
- (Italy) Marco Roccati
- (Romania) Bogdan Lobonț
- (Italy) Niccolò Manfredini
- (Italy) Gianluca Berti

=== Defenders ===
- (Denmark) Per Krøldrup
- (Italy) Dario Dainelli
- (Italy) Alessandro Gamberini
- (Italy) Christian Maggio
- (Italy) Davide Brivio
- (Czech Republic) Tomáš Ujfaluši
- (Italy) Manuel Pasqual
- (Italy) Giuseppe Pancaro
- (Italy) Marco Di Loreto

=== Midfielders ===
- (Italy) Marco Donadel
- (Italy) Andrea Paolucci
- (Italy) Stefano Fiore
- (Italy) Michele Pazienza
- (Italy) Riccardo Montolivo
- (Chile) Luis Jiménez
- (Denmark) Martin Jørgensen
- (France) Matthieu Bochu
- (Italy) Danilo D'Ambrosio
- (Uruguay) Gianni Guigou
- (Italy) Andrea De Falco
- (Italy) Cristian Brocchi

=== Forwards ===
- (Bulgaria) Valeri Bojinov
- (Italy) Samuel Di Carmine
- (Greece) Zisis Vryzas
- (Italy) Giampaolo Pazzini
- (Italy) Luca Toni
- (Italy) Enrico Fantini

== Competitions ==
=== Overall ===
Competition	Started round	Current position	Final position	First match	Last match
Serie A	Matchday 1	—	9th	27 August 2005	14 May 2006
Coppa Italia	First round	—	Round of 16	7 August 2005	10 January 2006

Last updated: 14 May 2006

=== Serie A ===
==== League table ====
Pos	Team	Pld	W	D	L	GF	GA	GD	Pts	Qualification or relegation
7	Parma (Note: Parma gained entry to the 2006–07 UEFA Cup because 2005–06 Coppa Italia finalists Inter and Roma qualified to the 2006–07 UEFA Champions League and 2006–07 UEFA Cup through their respective championship positions. The final positions of Parma and Empoli were decided by head-to-head record.)	38	12	9	17	46	60	−14	45	Qualification to UEFA Cup first round
8	Empoli	38	13	6	19	47	61	−14	45	
9	Fiorentina (Note: Milan, Fiorentina and Lazio were docked 30 points, all for involvement in the Calciopoli.)	38	22	8	8	66	41	+25	44	
10	Ascoli	38	9	16	13	43	53	−10	43	
11	Udinese	38	11	10	17	40	54	−14	43	

Source: 2005–06 Serie A, Soccerway
Rules for classification: 1) points; 2) goal difference; 3) number of goals scored.

==== Results summary ====
Overall								Home						Away					
Pld	W	D	L	GF	GA	GD	Pts	W	D	L	GF	GA	GD	W	D	L	GF	GA	GD
38	22	8	8	66	41	+25	74	16	1	2	42	20	+22	6	7	6	24	21	+3

Last updated: 14 May 2006.
Source: Competitive matches

==== Results by round ====
Round	1	2	3	4	5	6	7	8	9	10	11	12	13	14	15	16	17	18	19	20	21	22	23	24	25	26	27	28	29	30	31	32	33	34	35	36	37	38
Ground	H	A	H	A	A	H	A	H	A	H	A	H	A	H	H	A	H	A	H	A	H	A	H	H	A	H	A	H	A	H	A	H	A	A	H	A	H	A
Result	W	D	W	W	L	W	L	W	W	W	W	W	D	L	W	D	W	D	W	L	W	D	W	W	L	L	W	W	D	W	L	D	D	W	W	L	W	W
Position	3	5	2	2	5	3	4	4	4	3	3	3	3	4	3	4	4	4	4	4	4	4	4	4	4	5	5	4	4	4	4	4	5	4	4	4	4	9

Updated to match(es) played on 14 May 2006. Source: Competitive matches
A = Away; H = Home; W = Win; D = Draw; L = Loss

==== Matches ====
27 August 2005 1	Fiorentina	2–1	Sampdoria	Florence
20:30 CEST (UTC+02:00)	Fiore 12'; Toni 30' (pen.)	Report	Diana 74'	Stadium: Stadio Artemio Franchi; Attendance: 35,864; Referee: Gianluca Paparesta

11 September 2005 2	Messina	2–2	Fiorentina	Messina
15:00 CEST (UTC+02:00)	Di Napoli 57'; Zoro 61'	Report	Toni 9'; Bojinov 41'	Stadium: Stadio San Filippo; Attendance: 21,000; Referee: Pasquale Rodomonti

18 September 2005 3	Fiorentina	4–2	Udinese	Florence
15:00 CEST (UTC+02:00)	Fiore 38'; Toni 42', 86'; Donadel 79'	Report	Muntari 27'; Iaquinta 90+1' (pen.)	Stadium: Stadio Artemio Franchi; Attendance: 31,720; Referee: Paolo Dondarini

21 September 2005 4	Lecce	1–3	Fiorentina	Lecce
20:30 CEST (UTC+02:00)	Pinardi 45+2' (pen.)	Report	Fiore 48'; Bojinov 52'; Toni 63'	Stadium: Stadio Via del Mare; Attendance: 12,775; Referee: Massimo De Santis

25 September 2005 5	Internazionale	1–0	Fiorentina	Milan
20:30 CEST (UTC+02:00)	Martins 7'	Report		Stadium: San Siro; Attendance: 56,207; Referee: Stefano Farina

2 October 2005 6	Fiorentina	3–2	Livorno	Florence
15:00 CEST (UTC+02:00)	Toni 27'; Jørgensen 34'; Pazzini 60'	Report	Galante 85'; Morrone 88'	Stadium: Stadio Artemio Franchi; Attendance: 33,821; Referee: Nicola Ayroldi

16 October 2005 7	Lazio	1–0	Fiorentina	Rome
15:00 CEST (UTC+02:00)	Zauri 82'	Report		Stadium: Stadio Olimpico; Attendance: 27,502; Referee: Nicola Rizzoli

22 October 2005 8	Fiorentina	4–1	Parma	Florence
20:30 CEST (UTC+02:00)	Toni 2', 24', 60'; Fiore 36'	Report	Grella 66'	Stadium: Stadio Artemio Franchi; Attendance: 29,634; Referee: Emidio Morganti

26 October 2005 9	Siena	0–2	Fiorentina	Siena
20:30 CEST (UTC+02:00)		Report	Toni 2', 67'	Stadium: Stadio Artemio Franchi – Montepaschi Arena; Attendance: 15,007; Referee: Massimo De Santis

30 October 2005 10	Fiorentina	2–1	Cagliari	Florence
15:00 CET (UTC+01:00)	Toni 53'; Jørgensen 82'	Report	Suazo 23'	Stadium: Stadio Artemio Franchi; Attendance: 30,267; Referee: Marco Gabriele

6 November 2005 11	Ascoli	0–2	Fiorentina	Rimini
15:00 CET (UTC+01:00)		Report	Ujfaluši 1'; Toni 62'	Stadium: Stadio Romeo Neri; Attendance: 0 Referee: Antonio Dattilo

20 November 2005 12	Fiorentina	3–1	Milan	Florence
15:00 CET (UTC+01:00)	Toni 10', 87'; Jørgensen 46'	Report	Gilardino 25'	Stadium: Stadio Artemio Franchi; Attendance: 43,950; Referee: Pasquale Rodomonti

27 November 2005 13	Roma	1–1	Fiorentina	Rome
20:30 CET (UTC+01:00)	Tommasi 2'	Report	Toni 67' (pen.)	Stadium: Stadio Olimpico; Attendance: 39,690; Referee: Nicola Ayroldi

4 December 2005 14	Fiorentina	1–2	Juventus	Florence
15:00 CET (UTC+01:00)	Pazzini 39'	Report	Trezeguet 8'; Camoranesi 88'	Stadium: Stadio Artemio Franchi; Attendance: 43,537; Referee: Domenico Messina

10 December 2005 15	Fiorentina	1–0	Treviso	Florence
20:30 CET (UTC+01:00)	Fiore 52'	Report		Stadium: Stadio Artemio Franchi; Attendance: 28,249; Referee: Roland Herberg

18 December 2005 16	Empoli	1–1	Fiorentina	Empoli
15:00 CET (UTC+01:00)	Vannucchi 73'	Report	Pazzini 70'	Stadium: Stadio Carlo Castellani; Attendance: 12,548; Referee: Gianluca Paparesta

21 December 2005 17	Fiorentina	1–0	Palermo	Florence
20:30 CET (UTC+01:00)	Jørgensen 40'	Report		Stadium: Stadio Artemio Franchi; Attendance: 29,847; Referee: Roberto Rosetti

7 January 2006 18	Reggina	1–1	Fiorentina	Reggio Calabria
18:00 CET (UTC+01:00)	A. Lucarelli 12'	Report	Jørgensen 13'	Stadium: Stadio Oreste Granillo; Attendance: 10,255; Referee: Stefano Farina

15 January 2006 19	Fiorentina	2–1	Chievo	Perugia
15:00 CET (UTC+01:00)	Toni 35', 90+1'	Report	Zanchetta 69'	Stadium: Stadio Renato Curi; Attendance: 16,000; Referee: Matteo Trefoloni

18 January 2006 20	Sampdoria	3–1	Fiorentina	Genoa
20:30 CET (UTC+01:00)	Palombo 12'; Tonetto 25'; Flachi 32'	Report	Toni 14'	Stadium: Stadio Luigi Ferraris; Attendance: 22,586; Referee: Domenico Messina

22 January 2006 21	Fiorentina	2–0	Messina	Florence
20:30 CET (UTC+01:00)	Toni 45+1', 73'	Report		Stadium: Stadio Artemio Franchi; Attendance: 27,840; Referee: Gianluca Paparesta

29 January 2006 22	Udinese	0–0	Fiorentina	Udine
15:00 CET (UTC+01:00)		Report		Stadium: Stadio Friuli; Attendance: 16,728; Referee: Massimiliano Saccani

5 February 2006 23	Fiorentina	1–0	Lecce	Florence
15:00 CET (UTC+01:00)	Toni 37'	Report		Stadium: Stadio Artemio Franchi; Attendance: 28,696; Referee: Nicola Rizzoli

8 February 2006 24	Fiorentina	2–1	Internazionale	Florence
20:30 CET (UTC+01:00)	Brocchi 10'; Jiménez 60'	Report	Recoba 84'	Stadium: Stadio Artemio Franchi; Attendance: 41,399; Referee: Matteo Trefoloni

12 February 2006 25	Livorno	2–0	Fiorentina	Livorno
15:00 CET (UTC+01:00)	Lucarelli 67' (pen.), 76'	Report		Stadium: Stadio Armando Picchi; Attendance: 15,974; Referee: Massimo De Santis

19 February 2006 26	Fiorentina	1–2	Lazio	Florence
15:00 CET (UTC+01:00)	Bojinov 60'	Report	Behrami 33'; Rocchi 50'	Stadium: Stadio Artemio Franchi; Attendance: 30,196; Referee: Paolo Tagliavento

25 February 2006 27	Parma	2–4	Fiorentina	Parma
20:30 CET (UTC+01:00)	Simplício 3' (pen.); Bresciano 19'	Report	Bojinov 35', 39'; Jørgensen 48'; Jiménez 68'	Stadium: Stadio Ennio Tardini; Attendance: 16,708; Referee: Gianluca Paparesta

5 March 2006 28	Fiorentina	2–1	Siena	Florence
15:00 CET (UTC+01:00)	Toni 3'; Pazzini 90+1'	Report	Vergassola 15'	Stadium: Stadio Artemio Franchi; Attendance: 31,196; Referee: Domenico Messina

19 March 2006 30	Fiorentina	3–1	Ascoli	Florence
15:00 CET (UTC+01:00)	Brocchi 53'; Toni 83'; Pazzini 89'	Report	Domizzi 43'	Stadium: Stadio Artemio Franchi; Attendance: 31,120; Referee: Massimiliano Saccani

22 March 2006 29	Cagliari	0–0	Fiorentina	Cagliari
20:30 CET (UTC+01:00)		Report		Stadium: Stadio Sant'Elia; Referee: Pasquale Rodomonti

25 March 2006 31	Milan	3–1	Fiorentina	Milan
20:30 CET (UTC+01:00)	Shevchenko 20'; Kaká 48'; Gattuso 60'	Report	Toni 13'	Stadium: San Siro; Attendance: 64,700; Referee: Gianluca Paparesta

2 April 2006 32	Fiorentina	1–1	Roma	Florence
15:00 CEST (UTC+02:00)	Toni 2'	Report	Cufré 72'	Stadium: Stadio Artemio Franchi; Attendance: 40,786; Referee: Domenico Messina

9 April 2006 33	Juventus	1–1	Fiorentina	Turin
20:30 CEST (UTC+02:00)	Del Piero 63'	Report	Toni 47'	Stadium: Stadio delle Alpi; Attendance: 27,656; Referee: Tiziano Pieri

15 April 2006 34	Treviso	1–3	Fiorentina	Treviso
15:00 CEST (UTC+02:00)	Borriello 39'	Report	Toni 25'; Brocchi 49'; Montolivo 84'	Stadium: Stadio Omobono Tenni; Attendance: 7,547; Referee: Pasquale Rodomonti

22 April 2006 35	Fiorentina	2–1	Empoli	Florence
15:00 CEST (UTC+02:00)	Pasqual 43'; Jiménez 58'	Report	Riganò 66'	Stadium: Stadio Artemio Franchi; Attendance: 35,186; Referee: Stefano Farina

30 April 2006 36	Palermo	1–0	Fiorentina	Palermo
15:00 CEST (UTC+02:00)	Di Michele 53'	Report		Stadium: Stadio Renzo Barbera; Attendance: 30,056; Referee: Matteo Trefoloni

7 May 2006 37	Fiorentina	5–2	Reggina	Florence
15:00 CEST (UTC+02:00)	Fiore 25'; Toni 28', 64'; Jørgensen 35'; Bojinov 65'	Report	Amoruso 81', 84' (pen.)	Stadium: Stadio Artemio Franchi; Attendance: 38,534; Referee: Tiziano Pieri

14 May 2006 38	Chievo	0–2	Fiorentina	Verona
15:00 CEST (UTC+02:00)		Report	Toni 21'; Dainelli 85'	Stadium: Stadio Marc'Antonio Bentegodi; Attendance: 26,289; Referee: Mauro Bergonzi

=== Coppa Italia ===
==== First round ====
7 August 2005 First round	Fiorentina	4–0	Cisco Roma	Florence
21:00 CEST (UTC+02:00)	Fiore 6'; Toni 12'; Pazzini 82'; Bojinov 86' (pen.)			Stadium: Stadio Artemio Franchi; Attendance: 16,214; Referee: Mauro Bergonzi

==== Second round ====
14 August 2005 Second round	Rimini	1–2 (a.e.t.)	Fiorentina	Rimini
21:00 CEST (UTC+02:00)	Motta 34' (pen.)		Toni 83' (pen.); Donadel 120'	Stadium: Stadio Romeo Neri; Attendance: 6,855; Referee: Andrea Romeo

==== Third round ====
20 August 2005 Third round	Cesena	0–1	Fiorentina	Cesena
16:00 CEST (UTC+02:00)			Pazzini 90+4'	Stadium: Stadio Dino Manuzzi; Attendance: 4,601; Referee: Tiziano Pieri

==== Round of 16 ====
1 December 2005 First leg	Fiorentina	2–2	Juventus	Florence
21:05 CET (UTC+01:00)	Bojinov 38'; Pazzini 50'		Pessotto 52'; Mutu 69'	Stadium: Stadio Artemio Franchi; Attendance: 25,012; Referee: Luca Palanca

10 January 2006 Second leg	Juventus	4–1 (6–3 agg.)	Fiorentina	Turin
21:00 CET (UTC+01:00)	Del Piero 9', 17', 56' (pen.); Mutu 21'		Bojinov 64'	Stadium: Stadio delle Alpi; Attendance: 8,351; Referee: Antonio Dattilo
