= Eli Louhenapessy =

Dutch footballer (born 1976)

Personal information
- Full name: Elijah Jeremias Louhenapessy
- Date of birth: 14 October 1976 (age 50)
- Place of birth: Amsterdam, Netherlands
- Positions: Defender; midfielder

Youth career
- 1981–1984: DWS
- 1984–1996: Ajax

Senior career*
Years	Team	Apps	(Gls)
1996–1997	Ajax	1	(0)
1997–2001	Udinese	0	(0)
1997–1998	→ Genoa (loan)	12	(1)
1999–2000	→ De Graafschap (loan)	2	(0)
2000–2001	→ Salernitana (loan)	5	(0)
2001–2002	Bregenz	9	(0)
2002–2003	Tamai		
2003–2004	Sevegliano-Fauglis		
2004	Carrarese		
2004–2005	Pozzuolo del Friuli		
2005–2006	San Daniele Calcio		
2006–2008	Aurora Buonacquisto		
2008–2009	Buttrio		
2009–2016	Aurora Buonacquisto		
- * Club domestic league appearances and goals

Elijah Jeremias Louhenapessy (born 14 October 1976) is a Dutch retired footballer.

== Career ==
An AFC Ajax youth systeam product, he played a single game for the first team before being signed by Italian Serie A club Udinese in 1997, where he was originally supposed to rotate with Johan Walem in the midfield of their 3-4-3 formation. However, he never made a competitive appearance for the club, and at the end of the 2000–01 season, after a loan stint at Salernitana, he was released by Udinese.

After playing for SC Bregenz in Austria, Louhenapessy moved back to Udine to play amateur football in the area.

While playing in the Italian amateur leagues, Louhenapessy was subject to racist abuse from a player. In response, he "charged up and scored a hat-trick, preferring to react with facts rather than words".

== Personal life ==
Born in Amsterdam, of Moluccan descent, he settled down to Friuli-Venezia Giulia together with his partner from Udine after leaving professional football. After having shortly worked as a youth coach for a number of amateur clubs, he is currently (as of 2022) working as an employee for a company in the aluminium business.
