= Andrea Chiopris Gori =

Italian footballer (born 1977)

Personal information
- Full name: Andrea Chiopris Gori
- Date of birth: December 17, 1977 (age 48)
- Place of birth: Udine, Italy
- Height: 1.84 m (6 ft 0 in)
- Position: Midfielder

Team information
- Current team: Unione Sportiva Poggibonsi

Senior career*
Years	Team	Apps	(Gls)
1996–97	Udinese	0	(0)
1997–98	Prato	23	(2)
1998–99	ChievoVerona	4	(0)
1999–00	Como	3	(0)
2000–01	Lodigiani	21	(0)
2001–04	Alto Adige	68	(3)
2003	→ L'Aquila (loan)	10	(0)
2004–06	Prato	53	(7)
2006–07	Val di Sangro	11	(1)
2007	→ Portogruaro (loan)	17	(1)
2007–2008	San Marino Calcio	40	(4)
2009	Bassano	16	(2)
2010	Poggibonsi		
- * Club domestic league appearances and goals

Andrea Chiopris Gori (born 17 December 1977) is an Italian former footballer who played as a midfielder. He played his last professional championship for Serie C2 team Unione Sportiva Poggibonsi. In 2012, he closed his career in the Italian amateur team Lanciotto Campi Bisenzio.

== See also ==
- Football in Italy
- List of football clubs in Italy
