= Johan Walem =

Belgian footballer (born 1972)

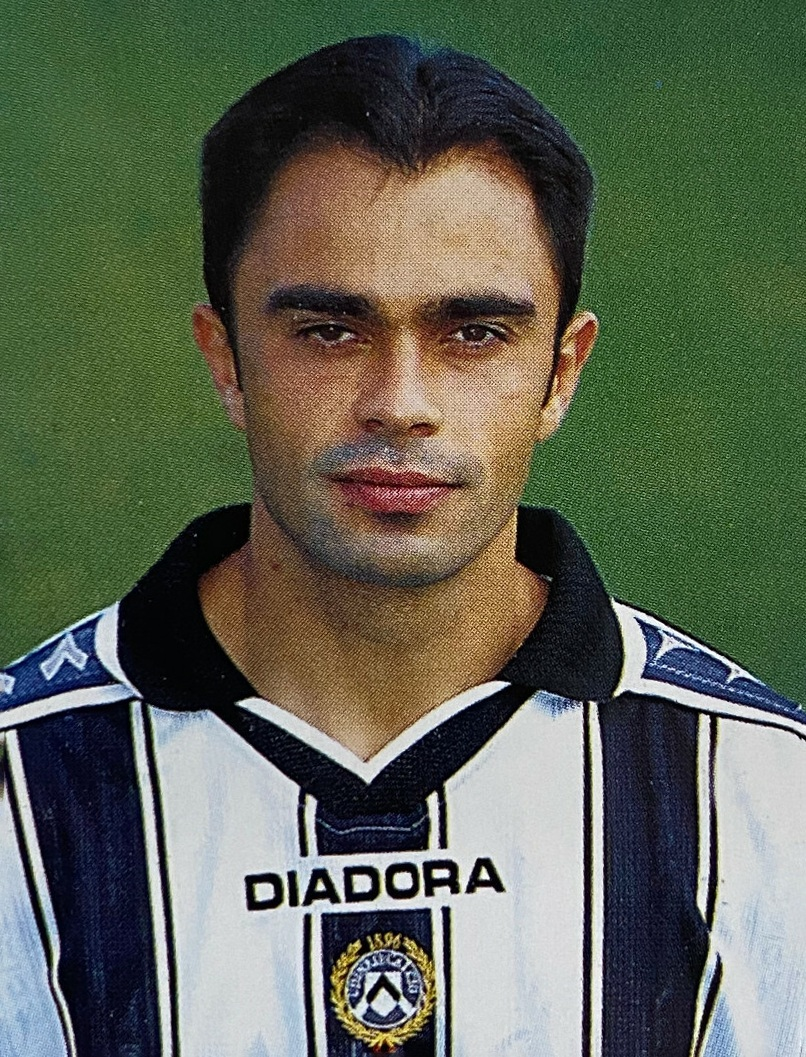
- Walem with Udinese in 1997

Personal information
- Date of birth: 1 February 1972 (age 54)
- Place of birth: Soignies, Belgium
- Height: 1.69 m (5 ft 7 in)
- Position: Midfielder

Youth career
- 1980–1986: Molenbeek
- 1986–1991: Anderlecht

Senior career*
Years	Team	Apps	(Gls)
1991–1997	Anderlecht	180	(17)
1997–1999	Udinese	32	(5)
1999–2000	Parma	24	(1)
2000–2001	Udinese	14	(0)
2001–2003	Standard Liège	59	(4)
2003–2004	Torino	21	(2)
2004–2005	Catania	14	(0)
Total		344	(29)

International career
1991–2002	Belgium	36	(2)

Managerial career
- 2008–2010: Anderlecht U19
- 2010–2011: Udinese (youth)
- 2011–2012: Udinese U19
- 2012–2015: Belgium U-21
- 2015–2016: Kortrijk
- 2016–2020: Belgium U-21
- 2020–2021: Cyprus
- * Club domestic league appearances and goals

Johan Walem (born 1 February 1972) is a Belgian football manager and former player. Walem was considered one of the best Belgian midfielders of his generation. He gained 36 caps for the national team, scoring two goals, of which one at the 2002 World Cup in Japan and South Korea. After his playing career, he worked as head coach of Kortrijk, the Cyprus national team and the Anderlecht women's football team.

== Club career ==
Walem was born in Soignies, Belgium. Aged 14, he joined the youth academy of Anderlecht in 1986 after spending six seasons in the youth ranks of RWD Molenbeek. During his time at Anderlecht, he played alongside Bertrand Crasson, with whom he had developed a close friendship. Walem made his first-team debut for Anderlecht in 1991 at the age of 19, two years after Crasson, in an away match against Lierse. Aged 19, he also made his European Cup debut on October 2, 1991, against Grasshoppers in Zurich, a match that saw the Belgian team win 0-3. Following his breakthrough season, he was named Belgian Young Professional Footballer of the Year.

A creative central midfielder, Walem was known for his vision, passing ability, technical skills, and strong left foot. Although highly regarded for his playmaking qualities, he scored relatively few goals, recording 18 goals in 247 official appearances. During his time at Anderlecht, which lasted until 1997, he won three Belgian league titles and one Belgian Cup.

In 1997, Walem moved to Italy, where he played in Serie A for Udinese. At Udinese, he was nicknamed Il Geometra (The Geometer) as he was very precise in his passes. His partnership with German striker Oliver Bierhoff was also praised at that time. In 1999, he joined Parma. After a two-season spell with Standard Liège, he returned to Italy to play in Serie B with Torino and Catania. Walem retired from professional football in 2005.

== International career ==
One of his country's top prospects in his position, after playing for every youth team starting with the U15s, Walem joined the Belgian senior national team in 1991, making his debut on November 20, 1991, in a 0-1 defeat to Germany in Euro '92 qualifying.

He played until 2002, making 36 appearances and scoring two goals, including one in the 2002 World Cup, the only one he played in his career, in a 3-2 victory against Russia. Walem scored the goal that sent his team to the round of 16.

At the World Cup held in South Korea and Japan, the Red Devils were eliminated in the round of 16 by Brazil (2-0), who went on to lift the trophy. Walem was otherwise called up for the 2000 European Championships, which were played in Belgium and the Netherlands, but was never used due to an ankle injury.

== Coaching career ==
He initially worked as a television football analyst for Belgacom TV before pursuing a full-time coaching career. He began coaching with the reserve team of Anderlecht, remaining in charge for two seasons. He subsequently worked with Udinese's Under-21 team, had two spells as head coach of the Belgium Under-21 national team, and also managed KV Kortrijk. He later became head coach of the Cyprus national team. As coach of the Anderlecht woman's team, he won the Belgian championship in 2022.

== Career statistics ==
Appearances and goals by club, season and competition
Club	Season	League			National cup (Note: Includes Belgian Cup, KNVB Cup, FA Cup)		Europe		Other		Total	
Club	Season	Division	Apps	Goals	Apps	Goals	Apps	Goals	Apps	Goals	Apps	Goals
Anderlecht	1991–92	First Division	30	0	1	0	9 (Note: Appearances in Europacup I/Champions League)	0	—		40	0
Anderlecht	1992–93	First Division	31	0	5	0	6 (Note: Appearances in UEFA Cup)	0	—		42	0
Anderlecht	1993–94	First Division	31	3	6	0	10	0	1 (Note: Appearances in Belgian Super Cup)	0	48	3
Anderlecht	1994–95	First Division	33	6	5	1	6	0	1	0	45	7
Anderlecht	1995–96	First Division	25	2	2	0	—		3 (Note: 2 appearances in UEFA Champions League qualifying round, 1 in Belgian Super Cup)	0	30	2
Anderlecht	1996–97	First Division	29	4	6	1	7	1	—		42	6
Anderlecht	Total		179	15	25	2	38	1	5	0	247	18
Udinese	1997–98	Serie A	28	2	2	0	4	0	—		34	2
Udinese	1998–99	Serie A	30	3	4	0	2	1	2 (Note: Appearances in Play-Out Serie A)	0	38	4
Udinese	Total		58	5	6	0	6	1	2	0	72	6
Parma	1999–2000	Serie A	24	0	2	1	5	1	2 (Note: Appearances in UEFA Champions League qualifying round)	1	33	3
Udinese	2000–01	Serie A	14	0	4	2	2	1	4 (Note: Appearances in UEFA Intertoto Cup)	1	24	4
Standard Liège	2001–02	Belgian First Division	27	0	1	0	4	0	2 (Note: Appearances in UEFA Cup qualifying round)	2	34	2
Standard Liège	2002–03	Belgian First Division	31	4	4	1	—		—		34	2
Standard Liège	Total		58	4	5	1	4	0	2	2	69	7
Torino	2003–04	Serie B	21	2	1	0	—		—		22	2
Catania	2004–05	Serie B	14	0	3	0	—		—		17	0
Career total			368	26	46	6	55	4	15	4	484	40

Appearances and goals by national team and year
National team	Year	Apps	Goals
Belgium	1991	1	0
Belgium	1992	3	0
Belgium	1994	1	0
Belgium	1995	2	0
Belgium	1996	2	0
Belgium	1998	2	0
Belgium	2000	3	0
Belgium	2001	7	0
Belgium	2002	7	1
Total		36	2

Scores and results list Belgium's goal tally first, score column indicates score after each Walem goal.

List of international goals scored by Bart Goor
No.	Date	Venue	Opponent	Score	Result	Competition
1	7 September 1999	Stade Maurice Dufrasne, Liège, Belgium	Morocco	2–0	4–0	Friendly
2	14 June 2002	Shizuoka Ecopa Stadium, Shizuoka, Japan	Russia	1–0	3–2	2002 World Cup

== Honours ==
=== Player ===
Anderlecht

- Belgian First Division: 1992–93, 1993–94, 1994–95
- Belgian Cup: 1993–94; runner-up 1996–97
- Belgian Super Cup: 1993, 1995

Parma

- Supercoppa Italiana: 1999

Udinese

- UEFA Intertoto Cup: 2000

Belgium

- FIFA Fair Play Trophy: 2002 World Cup

Individual

- Belgian Young Professional Footballer of the Year: 1991–92

== Managerial statistics ==
As of 17 November 2020

Team	From	To	Record				
Team	From	To	G	W	D	L	Win %
Cyprus	25 January 2020	17 February 2021	8	1	1	6	12.50
