= Gianluca Petrachi =

Italian footballer and sporting director

Personal information
- Full name: Gianluca Petrachi
- Date of birth: 14 January 1969 (age 57)
- Place of birth: Lecce, Italy
- Height: 1.77 m (5 ft 9 1/2 in)
- Position: Midfielder

Team information
- Current team: Roma (sporting director)

Youth career
- Lecce

Senior career*
Years	Team	Apps	(Gls)
1986–1988	Lecce	5	(0)
1988–1989	Nola	29	(1)
1989–1990	Taranto	100	(15)
1990–1991	Arezzo	19	(1)
1991–1993	Fidelis Andria	65	(9)
1993–1994	Venezia	34	(6)
1994	Torino	1	(0)
1994–1995	Palermo	27	(2)
1995–1997	Cremonese	44	(1)
1997–1998	Ancona	28	(5)
1998–1999	Perugia	28	(5)
1999–2001	Nottingham Forest	13	(0)
2000–2001	→ Perugia (loan)	5	(0)
2002–2003	Taranto	21	(4)
- * Club domestic league appearances and goals

Gianluca Petrachi (born 14 January 1969) is a retired Italian footballer and sporting director of Serie A club Torino.

== Playing career ==
A central midfielder, he began his career at hometown club Lecce, and played in the Serie A with Torino, Cremonese and Perugia, and also played in England for Nottingham Forest. Other clubs he played for include Nola, Taranto, Arezzo, Fidelis Andria, Venezia, Palermo and Ancona.

== Managerial career ==
After retiring as a footballer, he returned to Ancona as a team manager.

In 2006, he was named as technical area manager of Pisa, being successively promoted to director of football in the summer of 2007. He was instrumental in choosing Piero Braglia as head coach and providing the playing squad that won promotion from Serie C to Serie B, and then narrowly missing on a second consecutive promotion to Serie A the following season under the tenure of Gian Piero Ventura; he left Pisa in September 2008.

In December 2009, he was hired at Torino as an assistant to director of football Rino Foschi, then replacing him for good only one month later. Among his successes with the Granata, he achieved a promotion to Serie A in 2011, a UEFA Europa League qualification in 2014 (both under head coach Gian Piero Ventura, who then went on to coach the Italy national football team), and yet another UEFA Europa League spot in 2019; during his nine years in charge of transfer duties, many Torino players also managed to successfully break into the Italy national team, including: Danilo D'Ambrosio, Matteo Darmian, Alessio Cerci, Ciro Immobile, Daniele Baselli, Davide Zappacosta and Andrea Belotti.

On 25 June 2019, Roma appointed Gianluca Petrachi as their new sporting director after reaching an agreement with Serie A rivals Torino. Petrachi signed a three-year deal to succeed Frederic Massara, who filled the role following Monchi's exit in March. The 50-year-old officially began his new role with Roma on 1 July 2019.

On 14 June 2024, he was appointed new sporting director of Salernitana. On 3 January 2025, he was officially relieved of his duties; on the following 10 October, the club announced the consensual termination of his contract.

On 10 December 2025, he officially returned as the sporting director of Torino, six and a half years since his last spell.
