= Oliver Bierhoff =

German footballer (born 1968)

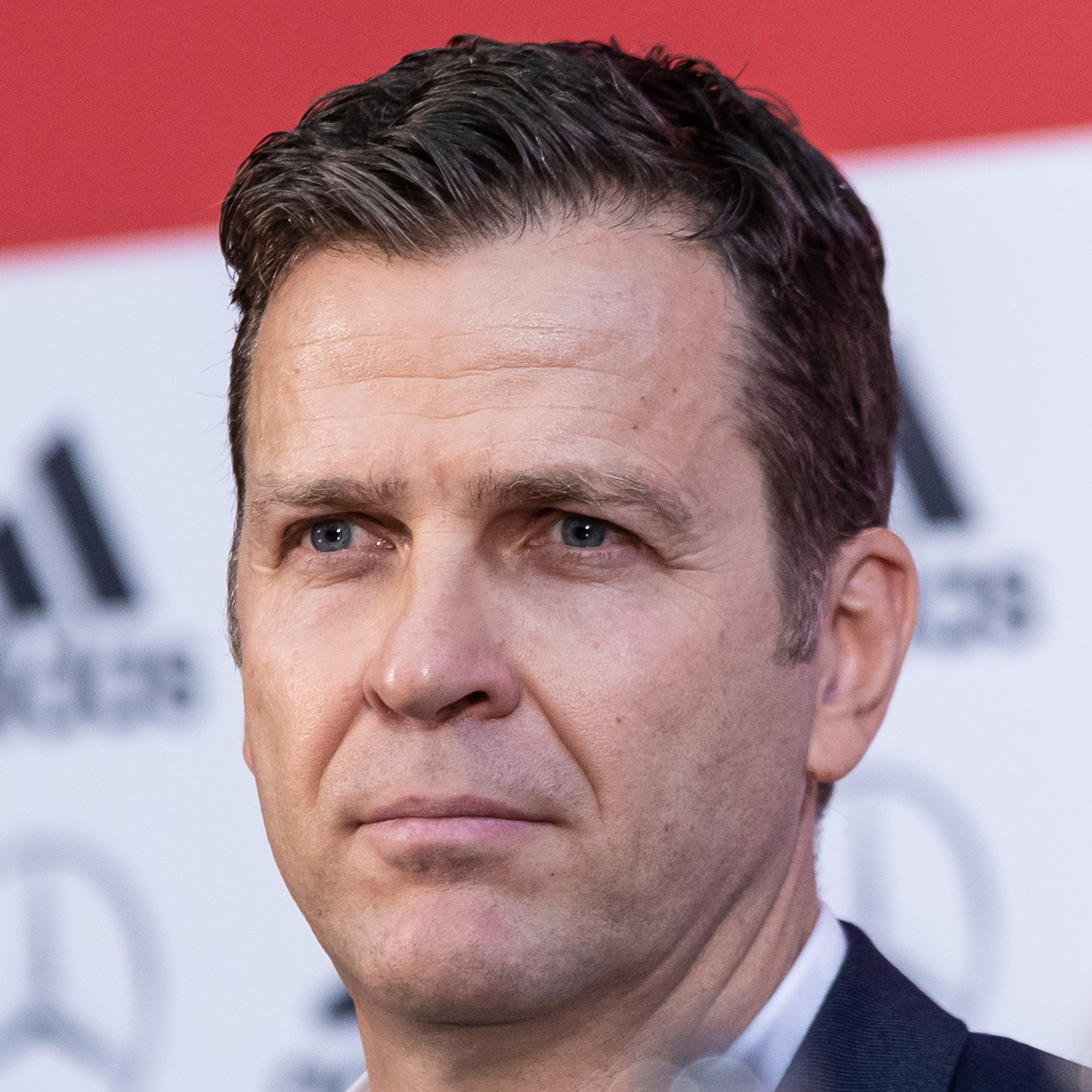
- Bierhoff in 2018

Personal information
- Full name: Oliver Bierhoff
- Date of birth: 1 May 1968 (age 58)
- Place of birth: Karlsruhe, West Germany
- Height: 1.91 m (6 ft 3 in)
- Position: Striker

Youth career
- 1974–1978: Essener SV 99
- 1978–1985: Schwarz-Weiß Essen
- 1985–1986: Bayer Uerdingen

Senior career*
Years	Team	Apps	(Gls)
1986–1988	Bayer Uerdingen	31	(4)
1988–1989	Hamburger SV	34	(6)
1989–1990	Borussia Mönchengladbach	8	(0)
1990–1991	Austria Salzburg	33	(23)
1991–1995	Ascoli	117	(48)
1995–1998	Udinese	86	(57)
1998–2001	AC Milan	91	(36)
2001–2002	Monaco	18	(4)
2002–2003	Chievo	26	(7)
Total		444	(185)

International career
1985–1986	West Germany U18	8	(4)
1986–1987	West Germany U19	4	(2)
1988–1990	West Germany U21	10	(7)
1996–2002	Germany	70	(37)
Medal record
Men's football
Representing Germany
UEFA European Championship
Winner	1996 England
FIFA World Cup
Runner-up	2002 Korea/Japan
- * Club domestic league appearances and goals

Oliver Bierhoff (born 1 May 1968) is a German football official and former professional player who played as a striker. He last served as the technical director of the Germany national team. During his playing career, he was a tall, strong and prolific goalscorer and was known for his abilities in the air and as a target man, while also being able to deliver pin-point headers towards goal.

Bierhoff spent his early career playing for Bayer Uerdingen, Hamburger SV and Borussia Mönchengladbach in the Bundesliga where he had modest success. After a season in the Austrian Bundesliga for Austria Salzburg, he was signed by Ascoli of the Italian Serie A. The club was relegated in his first season and Bierhoff played three seasons with them in the Serie B. He was subsequently signed by an Udinese team led by Alberto Zaccheroni in 1995 where he had great success and earned his first call-up to the Germany national team. He scored the first golden goal in the history of major international football for Germany in the Euro 96 final, a career-defining performance that vaulted him into the international limelight. He finished the 1997–98 season as Serie A's top-scorer. He was subsequently signed by AC Milan in 1998, winning the Serie A title in his first season with the club and setting a Serie A record for most headed goals in a single season, with 15. After three years at the club, Bierhoff had brief stints at Monaco and Chievo before retiring from playing in 2003.

== Club career ==
The son of a German utility magnate, Bierhoff played for nine different clubs, in four different countries. He scored a total of 102 goals in Serie A, one of the highest totals for a non-Italian in the league's history. In the 1997–98 season, he was the Serie A top scorer with 27 goals for Udinese.

Bierhoff, however, was never a success in the Bundesliga. After failing to shine in Germany, he got his chance in the Austrian Bundesliga. That gave him the chance at Ascoli in Italy. But it was at Udinese, under Alberto Zaccheroni, that Bierhoff found success and won his place in fame and in the Germany national team. He then transferred to AC Milan in 1998, winning the Serie A title in his first season with the club, scoring 19 goals in the league and 21 in all competitions, including the match-winning goal in the final, title-deciding match of the season, a 2–1 away win over Perugia. During the 1998–99 season, he set a Serie A record for most headed goals in a single season, with 15. After three seasons there, he moved to Ligue 1 side Monaco in 2001 for one year, before moving back to Serie A to play for ChievoVerona, where he retired at the end of the 2002–03 season. In his last game, he scored a hat-trick for Chievo in a 3–4 defeat to Juventus.

== International career ==
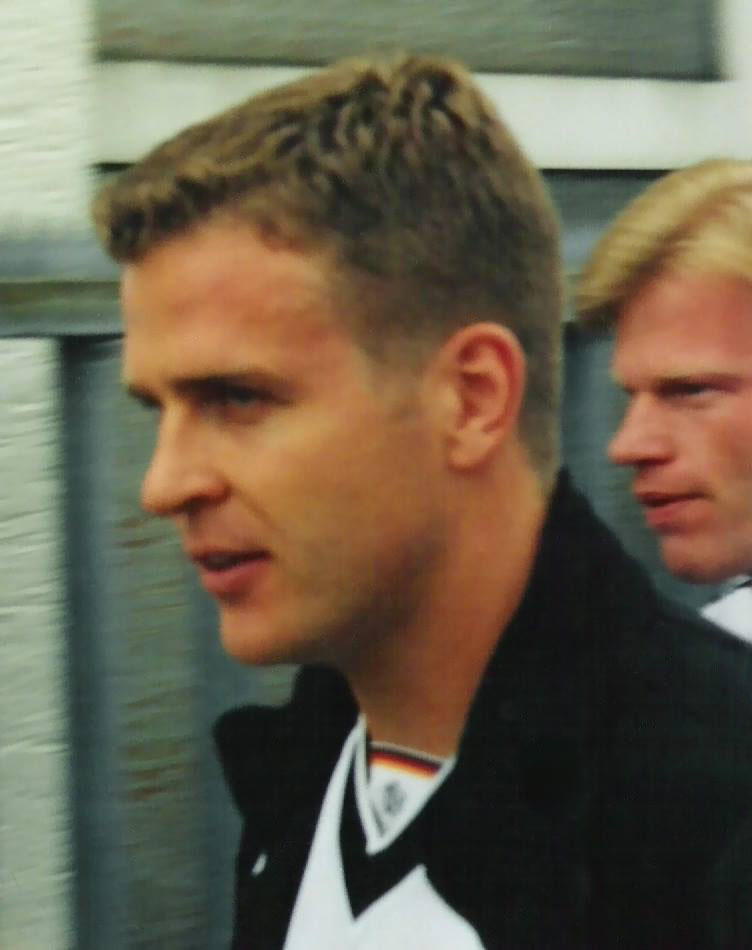
Bierhoff training with Germany, c. 1999

Bierhoff debuted for the Germany national team in a friendly against Portugal on 21 February 1996. In his second appearance on 27 March 1996, he scored his first two international goals in his country's 2–0 win over Denmark. Bierhoff was not initially going to be selected by coach Berti Vogts for Germany's UEFA Euro 1996, but Vogts's wife convinced him to take Bierhoff, saying, "he'll repay you." Bierhoff would come on as a substitute in the final against the Czech Republic with Germany 1–0 down, and scored both the equaliser and the golden goal in extra time to win the tournament.

In an important qualification match on 20 August 1997, Germany trailed Northern Ireland, 0–1, with 20 minutes left when the manager of the national team, Berti Vogts, sent in Thomas Häßler and Oliver Bierhoff. Within seven minutes the former provided Bierhoff with three assists, meaning Bierhoff had scored the fastest hat-trick in the history of the Germany national team.

In 1998, he was appointed captain of the national team after the retirement of Jürgen Klinsmann.

Bierhoff also played in Euro 2000, and both the 1998 and 2002 FIFA World Cups. In Germany's opening match of the 2002 tournament at the Sapporo Dome on 1 June, he scored in an 8–0 win over Saudi Arabia. He made his last appearance for his country on 30 June, when he was brought on during the second half of the 2002 FIFA World Cup final against Brazil, but was unable to help the Germans score in the 0–2 loss.

== Style of play ==
A large and prolific striker, Bierhoff was an aggressive player who played mainly as a target forward. Although he was not particularly technical, or a strong ball-player, he possessed good movement inside the box as well as strong hold-up play. He was known in particular for his excellent aerial ability; in addition to his height, strength, and elevation, he was able to execute headers with power and precision, having scored several critical goals with his head throughout his career for both club and country, which led him to be regarded as one of the best in the world at headers and as a specialist in the air. In addition to scoring goals, Bierhoff was also capable of providing assists to his teammates with his head through knock-downs. Although he was less adept at scoring with his feet, he also possessed a powerful shot.

== Administrative career ==
Bierhoff was the "team manager" (officially Teammanager der Nationalmannschaft) of the Germany national football team from 2004 until December 2017, a new position created as part of Jürgen Klinsmann's acceptance of the coaching job. Essentially the duties revolve around the public relations aspect of the team as opposed to coaching responsibilities. On 1 January 2018, a structural reform in the German Football Association took place and Bierhoff was named the technical director of the Germany national team (officially Direktor Nationalmannschaften und Akademie, "director national teams and football development"). After another early World Cup exit in 2022, Bierhoff had his contract terminated by the DFB, which was supposed to run until 2024.

== Personal life ==
On 22 June 2001, Bierhoff married Klara Szalantzy, a Munich-born-and-bred German former model of Hungarian ancestry who had formerly dated basketball player Dražen Petrović and was behind the wheel in the fatal June 1993 car crash on Bundesautobahn 9 (A9) near the town of Denkendorf that claimed Petrović's life. Bierhoff and Szalantzy had a daughter on 27 January 2007. He is a Roman Catholic.

Bierhoff features in EA Sports' FIFA video game series; he features in the FIFA 14 Ultimate-Team Legends.

He is a member of the AC Milan Hall of Fame.

Bierhoff was one of several celebrities in 2015 who endorsed the tabloid newspaper Bild's petition against far right group PEGIDA.

=== Education ===
Bierhoff took a correspondence course and graduated in 2002 with a degree in business economics from the University of Hagen.

== Career statistics ==
=== Club ===
Appearances and goals by club, season and competition
Club	Season	League			National cup (Note: Includes DFB-Pokal, Austrian Cup, Coppa Italia, Coupe de France)		League cup (Note: Includes Coupe de la Ligue)		Continental		Other		Total	
Club	Season	Division	Apps	Goals	Apps	Goals	Apps	Goals	Apps	Goals	Apps	Goals	Apps	Goals
Bayer Uerdingen	1986–87	Bundesliga	19	3	4	4	—		4 (Note: Appearances in UEFA Cup)	2	—		27	9
Bayer Uerdingen	1987–88	Bundesliga	12	1	1	0	—		—		—		13	1
Bayer Uerdingen	Total		31	4	5	4	—		4	2	—		40	10
Hamburger SV	1988–89	Bundesliga	24	6	3	1	—		—		—		27	7
Hamburger SV	1989–90	Bundesliga	10	0	1	0	—		—		—		11	0
Hamburger SV	Total		34	6	4	1	—		—		—		38	7
Borussia Mönchengladbach	1989–90	Bundesliga	8	0	—		—		—		—		8	0
Austria Salzburg	1990–91	Austrian Bundesliga	33	23	3	3	—		—		—		36	26
Ascoli	1991–92	Serie A	17	2	2	0	—		—		—		19	2
Ascoli	1992–93	Serie B	35	20	2	1	—		—		—		37	21
Ascoli	1993–94	Serie B	32	17	2	0	—		—		—		34	17
Ascoli	1994–95	Serie B	33	9	1	0	—		—		—		34	9
Ascoli	Total		117	48	7	1	—		—		—		124	49
Udinese	1995–96	Serie A	31	17	2	1	—		—		—		33	18
Udinese	1996–97	Serie A	23	13	1	0	—		—		—		24	13
Udinese	1997–98	Serie A	32	27	3	2	—		4	2	—		39	31
Udinese	Total		86	57	6	3	—		4	2	—		96	62
AC Milan	1998–99	Serie A	34	19	3	2	—		—		—		37	21
AC Milan	1999–2000	Serie A	30	11	3	1	—		6 (Note: Appearances in UEFA Champions League)	2	1 (Note: Appearance in Supercoppa Italiana)	0	40	14
AC Milan	2000–01	Serie A	27	6	5	1	—		10	2	—		42	9
AC Milan	Total		91	36	11	4	—		16	4	1	0	119	44
Monaco	2001–02	Division 1	18	4	4	1	3	2	—		—		25	7
Chievo	2002–03	Serie A	26	7	2	0	—		2	0	—		30	7
Career total			444	185	42	17	3	2	26	8	1	0	516	212

=== International ===
Appearances and goals by national team and year
National team	Year	Apps	Goals
Germany	1996	11	6
Germany	1997	8	7
Germany	1998	17	8
Germany	1999	8	6
Germany	2000	8	3
Germany	2001	7	1
Germany	2002	11	6
Total		70	37

Scores and results list Germany's goal tally first, score column indicates score after each Bierhoff goal

List of international goals scored by Oliver Bierhoff
No.	Date	Venue	Opponent	Score	Result	Competition
1	27 March 1996	Olympic Stadium, Munich, Germany	Denmark	1–0	2–0	Friendly
2	27 March 1996	Olympic Stadium, Munich, Germany	Denmark	2–0	2–0	Friendly
3	4 June 1996	Carl-Benz-Stadion, Mannheim, Germany	Liechtenstein	3–0	9–1	Friendly
4	30 June 1996	Wembley Stadium, London, England	Czech Republic	1–1	2–1 (a.e.t.)	UEFA Euro 1996
5	30 June 1996	Wembley Stadium, London, England	Czech Republic	2–1	2–1 (a.e.t.)	UEFA Euro 1996
6	4 September 1996	Górnik Stadium, Zabrze, Poland	Poland	1–0	2–0	Friendly
7	30 April 1997	Weserstadion, Bremen, Germany	Ukraine	1–0	2–0	FIFA World Cup 1998 qualifying
8	20 August 1997	Windsor Park, Belfast, Northern Ireland	Northern Ireland	1–1	3–1	FIFA World Cup 1998 qualifying
9	20 August 1997	Windsor Park, Belfast, Northern Ireland	Northern Ireland	2–1	3–1	FIFA World Cup 1998 qualifying
10	20 August 1997	Windsor Park, Belfast, Northern Ireland	Northern Ireland	3–1	3–1	FIFA World Cup 1998 qualifying
11	11 October 1997	Niedersachsenstadion, Hanover, Germany	Albania	2–1	4–3	FIFA World Cup 1998 qualifying
12	11 October 1997	Niedersachsenstadion, Hanover, Germany	Albania	4–3	4–3	FIFA World Cup 1998 qualifying
13	15 November 1997	Rheinstadion, Düsseldorf, Germany	South Africa	2–0	3–0	Friendly
14	30 May 1998	Waldstadion, Frankfurt, Germany	Colombia	1–0	3–1	Friendly
15	30 May 1998	Waldstadion, Frankfurt, Germany	Colombia	2–0	3–1	Friendly
16	5 June 1998	Carl-Benz-Stadion, Mannheim, Germany	Luxembourg	5–0	7–0	Friendly
17	5 June 1998	Carl-Benz-Stadion, Mannheim, Germany	Luxembourg	6–0	7–0	Friendly
18	21 June 1998	Stade Félix-Bollaert, Lens, France	Yugoslavia	2–2	2–2	FIFA World Cup 1998
19	25 June 1998	Stade de la Mosson, Montpellier, France	Iran	1–0	2–0	FIFA World Cup 1998
20	29 June 1998	Stade de la Mosson, Montpellier, France	Mexico	2–1	2–1	FIFA World Cup 1998
21	14 October 1998	Stadionul Republican, Chişinău, Moldova	Moldova	3–1	3–1	UEFA Euro 2000 qualifying
22	4 June 1999	BayArena, Leverkusen, Germany	Moldova	1–0	6–1	UEFA Euro 2000 qualifying
23	4 June 1999	BayArena, Leverkusen, Germany	Moldova	4–0	6–1	UEFA Euro 2000 qualifying
24	4 June 1999	BayArena, Leverkusen, Germany	Moldova	6–1	6–1	UEFA Euro 2000 qualifying
25	4 September 1999	Olympic Stadium, Helsinki, Finland	Finland	1–0	2–1	UEFA Euro 2000 qualifying
26	4 September 1999	Olympic Stadium, Helsinki, Finland	Finland	2–0	2–1	UEFA Euro 2000 qualifying
27	8 September 1999	Westfalenstadion, Dortmund, Germany	Northern Ireland	1–0	4–0	UEFA Euro 2000 qualifying
28	3 June 2000	Frankenstadion, Nuremberg, Germany	Czech Republic	2–1	3–2	Friendly
29	3 June 2000	Frankenstadion, Nuremberg, Germany	Czech Republic	3–2	3–2	Friendly
30	7 June 2000	Dreisamstadion, Freiburg, Germany	Liechtenstein	1–0	8–2	Friendly
31	15 August 2001	Népstadion, Budapest, Hungary	Hungary	5–2	5–2	Friendly
32	13 February 2002	Fritz Walter Stadion, Kaiserslautern, Germany	Israel	5–1	7–1	Friendly
33	27 March 2002	Ostseestadion, Rostock, Germany	United States	3–1	4–2	Friendly
34	9 May 2002	Dreisamstadion, Freiburg, Germany	Kuwait	2–0	7–0	Friendly
35	9 May 2002	Dreisamstadion, Freiburg, Germany	Kuwait	4–0	7–0	Friendly
36	9 May 2002	Dreisamstadion, Freiburg, Germany	Kuwait	6–0	7–0	Friendly
37	1 June 2002	Sapporo Dome, Sapporo, Japan	Saudi Arabia	7–0	8–0	FIFA World Cup 2002

== Honours ==
Ascoli

- Anglo-Italian Cup runner-up: 1994–95

AC Milan

- Serie A: 1998–99

Germany

- UEFA European Football Championship: 1996
- FIFA World Cup runner-up: 2002

Individual

- Serie A top scorer: 1997–98
- Serie B top scorer: 1992–93
- Goal of the Year (Germany): 1996
- Footballer of the Year (Germany): 1998
- FIFA XI (reserve): 1998
- AC Milan Hall of Fame

Orders

- Silbernes Lorbeerblatt: 2002, 2006, 2010, 2014

Sporting positions
Preceded by Jürgen Klinsmann	Germany captain 1998–2001	Succeeded by Oliver Kahn
