= Marco Zanchi =

Italian footballer (born 1977)

Personal information
- Date of birth: 15 April 1977 (age 49)
- Place of birth: San Giovanni Bianco, Italy
- Height: 1.78 m (5 ft 10 in)
- Position: Defender

Youth career
- Atalanta

Senior career*
Years	Team	Apps	(Gls)
1994–1996	Atalanta	19	(0)
1996–1997	Bari	6	(0)
1997	Chievo	0	(0)
1997–2000	Udinese	41	(0)
2000–2005	Juventus	5	(0)
2001	→ Vicenza (loan)	14	(3)
2001–2002	→ Verona (loan)	30	(1)
2002–2004	→ Bologna (loan)	23	(0)
2004–2005	→ Messina (loan)	29	(0)
2005–2008	Messina	84	(2)
2008–2012	Vicenza	86	(1)

International career
1995–2000	Italy U21	23	(0)
- * Club domestic league appearances and goals

Marco Zanchi (born 15 April 1977) is a retired Italian footballer who played as a defender.

== Career ==
Born in San Giovanni Bianco, Zanchi made his professional debut with Atalanta in 1994. He appeared in 19 games before 1996, when he transferred to Bari. He played very little in Bari, playing only 6 games before he was acquired by Udinese. Over 3 seasons there, Marco played in 42 matches. In 2000, he was on the Italian U-21 squad for the UEFA U-21 Championships. Zanchi was also on the Italian Squad for the Football at the 2000 Summer Olympics. He was acquired by Juventus in 2000. As part of the deal, Udinese got Morgan De Sanctis outright.

On 16 July 2012, he retired and began to work as an assistant coach with Vicenza, alongside Roberto Breda, and later Alessandro Dal Canto. On 15 July 2013, he became the assistant coach for Unione Venezia alongside Dal Canto once again. On 15 July 2014, he was appointed the new head coach of the "Allievi Nazionali" Vicenza Youth squad.

== Honours ==
Italy U21

- UEFA European Under-21 Championship: 2000
