= Mohammed Gargo =

Ghanaian footballer

Personal information
- Date of birth: 19 June 1975 (age 51)
- Place of birth: Accra, Ghana
- Height: 1.82 m (6 ft 0 in)
- Position: Defender

Senior career*
Years	Team	Apps	(Gls)
1991	Real Tamale United		
1991–1996	Torino	0	(0)
1993–1994	→ Borussia Dortmund II (loan)	0	(0)
1994–1995	→ Bayern Munich II (loan)	0	(0)
1995	→ Stoke City (loan)	0	(0)
1995–1996	→ Udinese (loan)	0	(0)
1996–2004	Udinese	88	(2)
2003	→ Venezia (loan)	18	(0)
2004–2005	Genoa	44	(0)
2005–2007	Al-Wakrah		(0)
2007–2008	Ashanti Gold		

International career
1991	Ghana U17	6	(2)
1993	Ghana U20	6	(1)
1992	Ghana U23	5	(1)
1992–2001	Ghana	20	(4)

Managerial career
- 2009–2010: New Edubiase United
- 2010–2012: Real Tamale United
- 2015: BA United
- 2016: Okwawu United
- 2018–2019: Tura Magic
- 2019–2020: African Stars
- 2020–: Steadfast
- 2022: Nsoatreman
- * Club domestic league appearances and goals

Medal record

Men's association football

Representing Ghana

Olympic Games
Bronze medal – third place	1992 Barcelona	Team competition

Mohammed Gargo (born 19 June 1975) is a Ghanaian former professional footballer who played as a defender.

== Playing career ==
=== Club ===
==== Torino ====
Gargo's performances at the 1991 FIFA U-17 World Championship brought him to the notice of European clubs' scouts. He had initially agreed to join Bayer 04 Leverkusen alongside fellow Ghana national under-17 football team member Sebastian Barnes. However Leverkusen withdrew from the Gargo transfer when it became evident that they could not compete financially with a much larger offer from Torino.

In October 1991 a payment of 100,000,000 Italian lira to Gargo's parents secured his move to Turin, where he was joined by his national under-17 team colleagues Samuel Kuffour and Emmanuel Duah. Torino's president Gian Mauro Borsano planned fake employment for the three players as "messengers" in his construction company until they were 18 years old and eligible to be registered as professional footballers.

The plan was controversial and the Italian Football Federation (FIGC) refused to register the Ghanaian players as either amateurs or professionals. FIGC president Antonio Matarrese compared the situation to the trafficking of children. Although Gargo and his father emphasised that they were happy with the arrangements in Turin, the football authorities retained their opposition. An appeal by Torino and Gargo to Confederation of African Football (CAF) was thrown out in October 1992, by which time Kuffour and Duah had already left the club. CAF president Issa Hayatou was particularly hostile to Dominico Ricci, whose African Football Management agency had brokered the transfers.

During the 1993–94 season, Gargo spent time at Borussia Dortmund, where his cousin Ibrahim Tanko already played. He was restricted to the club's Amateure team in the Oberliga Westfalen, and when Dortmund tried to buy him outright Torino declined the transfer fee on offer. In November 1994 Giovanni Trapattoni took Gargo to Bayern Munich. He suffered the same fate he had at Dortmund and was unable to conclude a transfer.

In May 1994 Gargo had appeared for Torino in a non-competitive game against rivals Juventus. The "Memorial Giorgio Calleri" fixture was staged in Novara and was marred by poor attendance and hooliganism. Gargo was subjected to racist chanting, while Torino supporters mocked the recent death of Andrea Fortunato. Gargo scored in a 2–2 draw before Torino lost the penalty shootout. Despite his three years of inactivity, Gargo maintained ambitions of playing competitively for Torino. However he was not favoured by the club's incoming president Gianmarco Calleri.

==== Stoke City ====
Gargo joined Stoke City as a pre-season trialist ahead of their 1995–96 campaign. After fielding him in a friendly match with Stockport County, Stoke's manager Lou Macari was impressed with Gargo's potential. However, Macari was less impressed with Gargo's poor attendance record and sudden unexplained departure, which took place shortly afterwards.

==== Udinese ====
Increasingly unhappy at his lack of competitive football, Gargo then joined Italian team Udinese in October 1995. After a further year of inactivity, Gargo was allowed to register with Udinese before their 1996–97 season. He transferred to Udinese on a free transfer, on the expiry of his five-year contract with Torino. Real Tamale United remained entitled to a sell-on fee and Gargo gave his former club a promissory note for $20,000 so they did not dispute his transfer to Udinese.

In Alberto Zaccheroni's progressive 3–4–3 formation, Gargo was usually deployed in defence, but was also capable of playing in midfield. The team performed above expectations although Gargo sustained an anterior cruciate ligament injury in a 4–0 defeat at Sampdoria on 18 May 1997.

With Udinese Gargo came to be recognised as a competent Serie A central defender, although troubled by frequent injuries. With his contract due to expire in 2001, he was linked with transfers to Inter Milan, and even an improbable return to Torino.

In January 2003 he was loaned to Venezia and in January 2004 sold to Serie B side Genoa along with Vittorio Micolucci, in exchange for Rodrigue Boisfer and Valon Behrami, all in a co-ownership deal, which few years later accused for inflated price in order to create paper profit. Udinese and Genoa were already fined in June 2008 by FIGC and criminal charge were continued.

=== International ===
Gargo was a member of the men's national team that won the bronze medal at the 1992 Summer Olympics in Barcelona, Spain, and gold in the 1991 FIFA U-17 World Championship in Italy.

In 2013 Gargo claimed that he had refused an approach to play for Ghana at the 2006 FIFA World Cup, the first time the nation had qualified, after being asked to pay a bribe.

== Coaching career ==
Gargo started after his retirement the job as coach in February 2010 by New Edubiase United. He trained the club of the Poly Tank Division One League until summer 2010. On 6 August 2010, he was named as the new manager of Poly Tank Division One League rival Real Tamale United. He coached the club RTU until November 2012 and resigned after the relegation from the Ghana Premier League his contract.

Gargo was appointed manager of Ghana Premier League club BA United in March 2015, but was sacked after one match when he accused his players of betting against themselves. The following year a short spell in charge of Okwawu United ended when he fell out with his players again, this time accusing them of "sexually promiscuous acts" in the club house. In September 2018 Namibian Premier League club Tura Magic F.C. signed a contract with Gargo as their head coach.

== Personal life ==
Gargo was born in the Burma Camp in Accra, where his father was a Physical training instructor in the Ghana Army. The family hailed from Bawku, part of the Busanga tribe of Mandé ethnicity.

== Career statistics ==
=== International ===
Scores and results list Ghana's goal tally first, score column indicates score after each Gargo goal.

List of international goals scored by Mohammed Gargo
No.	Date	Venue	Opponent	Score	Result	Competition
1	27 April 1997	Accra Sports Stadium, Accra, Ghana	Gabon	2–0	3–0	1998 FIFA World Cup qualification
2	27 April 1997	Accra Sports Stadium, Accra, Ghana	Gabon	3–0	3–0	1998 FIFA World Cup qualification
3	18 January 1998	Accra Sports Stadium, Accra, Ghana	Mozambique	1–0	3–1	Friendly
4	9 February 1998	Stade du 4 Août, Ouagadougou, Burkina Faso	Tunisia	2–0	2–0	1998 Africa Cup of Nations

== Honours ==
Udinese

- UEFA Intertoto Cup: 2000

Ghana U17

- FIFA U-17 World Championship: 1991

Ghana U20

- FIFA World Youth Championship: runner-up 1993
