= Giovanni Bia =

Italian footballer (born 1968)

Personal information
- Date of birth: 24 October 1968 (age 58)
- Place of birth: Parma, Italy
- Height: 1.78 m (5 ft 10 in)
- Position: Defender

Senior career*
Years	Team	Apps	(Gls)
1984–1986	Parma	1	(0)
1986–1990	Perugia	57	(1)
1990–1992	Parma	1	(0)
1990–1991	→ Trento (loan)	25	(3)
1992–1993	Cosenza	35	(6)
1993–1994	Napoli	28	(3)
1994–1995	Internazionale	23	(0)
1995–1998	Udinese	56	(8)
1997–1998	Brescia	19	(0)
1998–2001	Bologna	67	(4)
2001–2002	Saint-Étienne	20	(1)
2002–2003	Reggiana	22	(1)
- * Club domestic league appearances and goals

Giovanni Bia (born 24 October 1968) is an Italian former footballer who played as a defender.

He made his Serie A debut on 5 April 1992 with Parma in a 1–1 draw against Cagliari. He also played for Napoli, Inter, Bologna, Udinese and Brescia. During the 1992–93 season, he played in Serie B with Cosenza. It was a very successful season that proved to be a breakthrough for Bia when he was recruited by Napoli, whose manager at the time was Marcello Lippi. His most successful seasons were probably from 1995 to 1997 when he played for Udinese, under the guidance of Alberto Zaccheroni, and also the three seasons he played for Bologna. In his career, he also wore the colours of Perugia (Serie C1 and C2), Trento (C1) and Reggiana (C1), in addition to that of Ligue 2 side Saint Etienne in France.

In total, he made 194 appearances in Serie A, scoring 15 goals.

He is currently the agent of players such as Luca Cigarini, Daniele Dessena and Federico Macheda.
