= Graziano Battistini (footballer) =

Italian footballer

Personal information
- Date of birth: 30 September 1970 (age 56)
- Place of birth: Monza, Italy
- Height: 1.91 m (6 ft 3 in)
- Position: Goalkeeper

Senior career*
Years	Team	Apps	(Gls)
1989–1990	Seregno	32	(0)
1990–1991	Udinese	0	(0)
1991–1992	SPAL	0	(0)
1992–1993	U.S. Alessandria	25	(0)
1993–1997	Udinese	99	(0)
1997–2000	Verona	76	(0)
2000–2001	Treviso	26	(0)
2001–2005	Bari	65	(0)
2005–2006	Casale	22	(0)
- * Club domestic league appearances and goals

Graziano Battistini (born 30 September 1970) is an Italian former professional footballer who played as a goalkeeper. He previously played for Seregno, Udinese, SPAL, U.S. Alessandria, Verona, Treviso, Bari and Casale.
