= Alessandro Calori =

Italian football player and manager (born 1966)

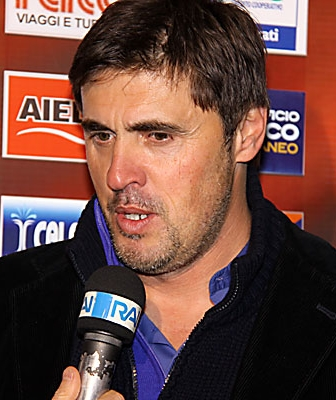

Personal information
- Date of birth: 29 August 1966 (age 60)
- Place of birth: Arezzo, Italy
- Height: 1.89 m (6 ft 2 in)
- Position: Centre back

Youth career
- 1984–1985: Arezzo

Senior career*
Years	Team	Apps	(Gls)
1985–1989	Montevarchi	78	(3)
1989–1991	Pisa	61	(1)
1991–1999	Udinese	255	(10)
1999–2000	Perugia	33	(5)
2000–2002	Brescia	63	(1)
2002–2004	Venezia	58	(1)
Total		548	(21)

Managerial career
- 2005: Triestina
- 2006: Sambenedettese
- 2008: Avellino
- 2009–2010: Portosummaga
- 2010–2011: Padova
- 2011–2013: Brescia
- 2013–2014: Novara
- 2015: Brescia
- 2016–2018: Trapani
- 2019: Ternana
- * Club domestic league appearances and goals

Alessandro Calori (born 29 August 1966) is an Italian football coach and former player, last in charge as head coach of Ternana. As a defender, he is mostly remembered for his lengthy spell with Udinese during the 90s, where he also served as the club's captain.

== Playing career ==
Calori was born in Arezzo. A product of Arezzo's youth system, Calori made his professional debut in 1985 with Serie C team Montevarchi, where he spent four season. After two seasons with Pisa, in 1991 Calori joined Udinese, where he spent eight seasons, all as a regular starter, gaining a reputation as a powerful and physically strong centre back, with good leadership skills, and later also being named the club's captain. In 1999 Calori, then aged 33, signed for Perugia, and gained space in the headlines as he scored the winning goal in a 1–0 win to Juventus in the final league week, a goal that unexpectedly let Juventus lose the Serie A title to Lazio. He retired in 2004, after spells with Brescia and Venezia.

== Coaching career ==
Following his retirement as a player, Calori initially stayed at Venezia, joining the managing staff that worked alongside head coach Julio César Ribas in the arancioneroverdi's 2004–05 season, initially as team manager, and then as assistant coach. In 2005, he became joint coach of Serie B side Triestina, alongside Adriano Buffoni, only to be sacked a few weeks later. In 2006, he was then appointed at the helm of Serie C1 team Sambenedettese, a spell which proved to be unsuccessful as he was sacked in October 2006.

On 10 March 2008, he was unveiled as new Avellino coach, replacing Guido Carboni. He left his post in June, after having failed to save his team from relegation.

In February 2009 he was unveiled as new head coach of Lega Pro Prima Divisione club Portosummaga, replacing Manuele Domenicali. He guided Portosummaga to win the Lega Pro Prima Divisione title in 2009–10, and automatic promotion to Serie B for his club, in a historical first time in the Italian second division for his club. On 2 July 2010, he was unveiled as new head coach of Serie B club Padova. Despite a good first half of season, Calori was dismissed by Padova on 15 March 2011 following a string of negative results.

On 12 December 2011, he was named new head coach of Serie B side Brescia, as a replacement for Giuseppe Scienza.

He served as head coach of Trapani Calcio from 2016 to 2018, during which the club was relegated to Serie C and failed to be promoted the following season.

On 20 January 2019, Calori was appointed as the manager of Ternana. After less than one month, on 14 February, Calori was fired after he only managed to pick up two points in five league games.

== Style of play ==
While not known for his flair as a defender, Calori was a physically strong centre back, with a hard-tackling playing style.
