= Paolo Poggi =

Italian footballer

Personal information
- Date of birth: February 16, 1971 (age 55)
- Place of birth: Venice, Italy
- Height: 1.81 m (5 ft 11 1/2 in)
- Position: Striker

Senior career*
Years	Team	Apps	(Gls)
1989–1992	Venezia	66	(15)
1992–1994	Torino	43	(6)
1994–1999	Udinese	172	(48)
2000	Roma	11	(0)
2001	Bari	16	(4)
2001–2002	Piacenza	29	(3)
2002–2003	Venezia	50	(14)
2004	Ancona	9	(0)
2004–2006	Mantova	66	(17)
2006–2009	Venezia	91	(15)
Total		553	(122)
- * Club domestic league appearances and goals

Paolo Poggi (born February 16, 1971) is an Italian retired professional footballer who played as a striker.

During the 2001–02 Serie A season, Poggi scored the fastest goal in Serie A history, scoring against Fiorentina with Piacenza in the opening eight seconds of the match; this record was later beaten by Rafael Leão in 2020, scoring after six seconds.
