= Jonathan Bachini =

Italian former footballer

Personal information
- Date of birth: 5 June 1975 (age 51)
- Place of birth: Livorno, Italy
- Height: 1.75 m (5 ft 9 in)
- Position: Midfielder

Youth career
- Alessandria

Senior career*
Years	Team	Apps	(Gls)
1992–1999	Udinese	55	(6)
1995	→ Alessandria (loan)	12	(0)
1996	→ Juve Stabia (loan)	17	(3)
1996–1997	→ Lecce (loan)	23	(2)
1999–2001	Juventus	13	(0)
2001	→ Brescia (loan)	20	(2)
2001–2003	Parma	1	(0)
2001–2003	→ Brescia (loan)	27	(3)
2003–2005	Brescia	28	(2)
2005–2006	Siena	5	(0)

International career
1997	Italy U-21	4	(0)
1998	Italy	2	(0)
- * Club domestic league appearances and goals

Jonathan Bachini (Italian pronunciation: [ˈdʒɔːnatam baˈkiːni]; born 5 June 1975) is an Italian former footballer who played as a midfielder.

== Club career ==
In his earlier years, Bachini was considered a promising midfielder, even making two appearances for the Italy national football team in 1998, under manager Dino Zoff; an offensive winger with good feet and goalscoring ability, he was known in particular for his speed, work-rate, strength, and stamina. Throughout his club career, Bachini played for Lecce, Udinese, Juventus FC, Brescia, Parma, and Siena, in Serie A. While at Juventus he helped them win the 1999 UEFA Intertoto Cup.

On 3 July 2001, he joined Parma from Juve as part of Gianluigi Buffon's deal. However, Bachini returned to Brescia on loan in September 2001, with Aimo Diana moved to opposite direction. The loan was renewed in June 2002. In July 2003 Brescia finally signed Bachini outright, along with Parma teammate Matuzalém.

=== Drug bans ===
On 22 September 2004 Bachini tested positive for cocaine usage while at Brescia; on 25 November 2004, he was suspended for 9 months. Following the termination of his suspension, he was acquired by Siena in 2005; in January 2006, however, Bachini's urine sample collected from the match against Lazio on 4 December 2005 tested positive for cocaine again, and as a result, he was banned for life by the Italian Football Federation (FIGC) as of 10 January 2006.

== See also ==
- Bachini, a village in India
- List of sportspeople sanctioned for doping offences
