= Tomas Locatelli =

Italian footballer (born 1976)

Personal information
- Full name: Tomas Locatelli
- Date of birth: 9 June 1976 (age 50)
- Place of birth: Bergamo, Italy
- Height: 1.75 m (5 ft 9 in)
- Position: Midfielder

Youth career
- 1992–1994: Atalanta

Senior career*
Years	Team	Apps	(Gls)
1994–1995	Atalanta	33	(1)
1995–1997	Milan	10	(0)
1997–2000	Udinese	93	(8)
2000–2005	Bologna	111	(17)
2005–2008	Siena	72	(9)
2008–2010	Mantova	52	(7)
2010–2011	SPAL	10	(0)
2012	Arezzo		

International career
1994–1997	Italy U21	10	(1)
1999–2000	Italy	2	(0)
- * Club domestic league appearances and goals

Tomas Locatelli (Italian pronunciation: [ˈtɔːmaz lokaˈtɛlli]; born 9 June 1976) is an Italian former footballer who usually played as a playmaking attacking midfielder behind the forwards; he was also capable of playing as a central midfielder.

== Club career ==
Locatelli played over 200 matches in Serie A. After being a member of the club's youth side, he started his professional career at native club Atalanta in 1993 and made his Serie A debut against Udinese, on 2 April 1994. He moved to AC Milan in 1995, spending two seasons with the club, making 10 league appearances, also winning the 1995–96 Serie A title. During his time with the club, he made his European debut in the 1996–97 UEFA Champions League, also scoring a goal in a 4–2 home win over Göteborg on 30 October 1996. In 1997, he moved to Udinese, and in 2000 he moved to Bologna, where he remained for five seasons. He signed with AC Siena after Bologna were relegated to Serie B in 2005.

During the 2008–09 and 2009–10 seasons, he played for Serie B club Mantova. In the 2010–11 season, he played for SPAL in Lega Pro Prima Divisione. Since 31 March 2012 he has played for Arezzo in Serie D.

He was banned 2 years for involvement in 2011–12 Italian football scandal on 18 June 2012.

== International career ==
Locatelli has made 10 appearances for the Italy national under-21 football team, scoring one goal. He has also made 2 appearances for the senior Italy national football team, making his national team debut on 13 November 1999, in a 3–1 friendly home defeat to Belgium, in Lecce.

== Trivia ==
Due to having several commonalities with Manuel Locatelli, such as birthplace and the experience of playing for both Atalanta and AC Milan, he was mistakenly thought to be the player's father by a number of pundits. However, he has later stated that there are no family ties between him and Manuel.

== Honours ==
Milan

- Serie A: 1995–96
