= Valerio Bertotto =

Italian footballer (born 1973)

Personal information
- Date of birth: 15 January 1973 (age 53)
- Place of birth: Turin, Italy
- Height: 1.79 m (5 ft 10 in)
- Position: Right back

Senior career*
Years	Team	Apps	(Gls)
1990–1993	Alessandria	26	(0)
1993–2006	Udinese	334	(3)
2006–2008	Siena	43	(2)
2009	Venezia	19	(0)

International career
2000–2001	Italy	4	(0)

Managerial career
- 2012–2015: Italy U20
- 2016: Pistoiese
- 2016: Messina
- 2017: Bassano Virtus
- 2017: Viterbese Castrense
- 2020: Ascoli
- 2023–2025: Giugliano
- 2025–2026: Picerno
- * Club domestic league appearances and goals

Valerio Bertotto (Italian pronunciation: [vaˈlɛːrjo berˈtɔtto]; born 15 January 1973) is an Italian football manager and former professional footballer who played as a defender.

== Club career ==
Bertotto started his professional career during the 1990–91 season with Alessandria in the Italian Serie C2. He joined Udinese in 1993, where he quickly became a historical masterpiece for the team, spending thirteen seasons with the Friuli side, also captaining his side to what is to date their only appearance in the UEFA Champions League. Bertotto also holds the record for the most matches played for Udinese.

In July 2006, aged 33, he left Udinese to join Siena, another Serie A team, where he played two seasons as a regular for the Tuscan side. Subsequently, he was released as a free agent in June 2008. In January 2009, he accepted an offer from Lega Pro Prima Divisione club Venezia. However, he was released for free after the club was excluded from the Italian football panorama due to financial issues.

In 2010, he obtained his UEFA A coaching license, which qualified him to coach Lega Pro teams.

== International career ==
Bertotto has played four times for the Italy national football team between 2000 and 2001, all during his spell at Udinese, with his senior international debut coming in a World Cup qualifying match against Georgia on 11 October 2000, held in Ancona, under manager Giovanni Trapattoni. He missed the 2002 FIFA World Cup due to a knee injury.

== Style of play ==
Bertotto was a hard-tackling central or right-sided defender, who was solid in the air, and effective in the timing of his challenges. Although he was neither particularly quick nor technically gifted, he made up for his pace and skill with experience and positional sense, and his strength was his ability to defend opposing forwards in one-on-one situations. He also stood out for his leadership throughout his career.

== Managerial career ==
=== Italy U20 Lega Pro ===
On 9 August 2012 he was named head coach (Italian: selezionatore) of the Italy U20 Lega Pro in place of Giorgio Veneri.

=== Serie C years ===
In April 2016, he took over the reins at Serie C club Pistoiese, guiding them to safety. He left in June 2016 to become the new head coach of Messina, which he left in August during the pre-season due to disagreements with the board.

In March 2017, he returned to management, accepting an offer from Serie C club Bassano Virtus, with whom he qualified for the promotion playoffs. He successively served as head coach of another Serie C club, Viterbese Castrense, between July and October 2017.

=== Ascoli ===
On 25 August 2020, after three years of inactivity, he was named new head coach of Serie B club Ascoli, this being Bertotto's first coaching experience in the Italian second division.

He was dismissed on 29 November 2020 due to poor results following a 1–2 league defeat to Venezia.

=== Giugliano ===
On 4 October 2023, after three years without a job, Bertotto returned to management as the new head coach of Serie C relegation-battling club Giugliano. He departed Giugliano in June 2025, after two seasons in charge of the Campanian club.

=== Picerno ===
On 13 October 2025, Bertotto was named new head coach of Serie C club Picerno.

== Personal life ==
On 4 November 2020 he tested positive for COVID-19.

== Managerial statistics ==
As of 31 October 2020

Managerial record by team and tenure
Team	From	To	Record							
Team	From	To	G	W	D	L	GF	GA	GD	Win %
Pistoiese	12 April 2016	11 June 2016	4	3	0	1	6	2	+4	75.00
Messina	16 June 2016	20 August 2016	2	1	0	1	3	2	+1	50.00
Bassano Virtus	1 March 2017	25 May 2017	12	3	2	7	10	14	−4	25.00
Viterbese Castrense	21 July 2017	8 October 2017	10	6	1	3	22	13	+9	60.00
Ascoli	25 August 2020	Present	7	1	1	5	4	11	−7	14.29
Total			35	14	4	17	45	42	+3	40.00

== Honours ==
Udinese

- UEFA Intertoto Cup: 2000
