= Régis Genaux =

Belgian footballer (1973–2008)

- Genaux with Udinese in 1998

Personal information
- Full name: Régis Hervé Genaux
- Date of birth: 31 August 1973
- Place of birth: Charleroi, Belgium
- Date of death: 8 November 2008 (aged 35)
- Place of death: Chaudfontaine, Belgium
- Height: 1.80 m (5 ft 11 in)
- Position: Right back

Youth career
- 1981–1988: Charleroi
- 1988–1990: Standard Liège

Senior career*
Years	Team	Apps	(Gls)
1990–1996	Standard Liège	151	(1)
1996	Coventry City	4	(0)
1997–2003	Udinese	51	(0)
2001–2002	→ Standard Liège (loan)	4	(0)
Total		210	(1)

International career
1988	Belgium U15	2	(0)
1989–1990	Belgium U16	10	(0)
1989–1990	Belgium U17	11	(1)
1990–1991	Belgium U18	6	(0)
1991–1994	Belgium U21	8	(0)
1992–2000	Belgium	22	(0)

Managerial career
- 2004–2005: Louviéroise (youth)
- 2005–2006: Verviétois (youth)
- 2006: Sérésien
- * Club domestic league appearances and goals

Régis Hervé Genaux (31 August 1973 – 8 November 2008) was a Belgian professional footballer who played as a right back.

During his career he represented three clubs in three countries, mainly Standard Liège and Udinese. He died at the young age of 35 from the effects of a pulmonary embolism.

== Club career ==
After having started playing football with R. Charleroi SC, Genaux began his professional career aged 17 at Standard Liège, where he helped to win one Belgian Cup and achieved two Pro League runner-up places.

In 1996 Genaux moved to England, joining Coventry City. However, his spell at the club lasted just half a season, with only four Premier League appearances before he signed, in January 1997, with Italy's Udinese Calcio.

Due to persisting injuries during the most part of his career, Genaux retired at just 29, after having returned to Standard for a final season. Afterwards he moved into coaching, starting with the youths at R.A.A. Louviéroise and R.C.S. Verviétois; for a few months in 2006, he took the reins of third division side RFC Sérésien (formerly Seraing).

== International career ==
Genaux played 22 times (being selected 27) with Belgium, the first being on 16 February 1992, in a friendly match against Tunisia, aged not yet 19. He seemed poised to be the successor of Eric Gerets in the Diables Rouges, although he was not picked up for the 1994 FIFA World Cup.

Genaux became a regular fixture in the following years, but Belgium failed to qualify for UEFA Euro 1996. With the arrival of Georges Leekens, he lost his place in the national team, and was also not selected for the 1998 FIFA World Cup in France at the expense of Éric Deflandre and Bertrand Crasson; regarded as one of the best right-backs in Belgium in the 1990s, he would not attend any major international tournaments, also missing UEFA Euro 2000 due to injury.

== Personal life ==
- Genaux's brother, Terrence, was also a footballer, with the pair being distantly related to Vivica Genaux, a mezzo-soprano.
- At Standard, alongside fellow internationals Philippe Léonard and Michaël Goossens, he was part of The Three Musketeers generation, hailed for their sporting talent but with a troublesome character (with Roberto Bisconti playing a smaller role).

== Death ==
On 8 November 2008, Genaux died from heart failure due to a pulmonary embolism, whilst in his house. He was only 35.

== Honours ==
Standard Liège

- Belgian Cup: 1992–93

Udinese

- UEFA Intertoto Cup: 2000
