= Alessandro Pierini =

Italian footballer (born 1973)

Personal information
- Date of birth: 22 March 1973 (age 53)
- Place of birth: Viareggio, Italy
- Height: 1.85 m (6 ft 1 in)
- Position: Defender

Youth career
- 1989–1991: Udinese

Senior career*
Years	Team	Apps	(Gls)
1991–1999	Udinese	123	(6)
1995–1996	→ Fidelis Andria (loan)	28	(0)
1999–2002	Fiorentina	70	(2)
2002–2003	Reggina	14	(1)
2003	→ Parma (loan)	3	(0)
2003–2004	Udinese	18	(0)
2004	Racing Santander	5	(0)
2005–2009	Córdoba	150	(15)
Total		411	(23)

International career
2001	Italy	1	(0)

Managerial career
- 2009–2011: Córdoba (assistant)
- 2011–2012: Córdoba B
- 2012–2013: Ronda
- 2014–2015: Camaiore
- 2015–2016: Viareggio 2014
- 2017: Fezzanese
- 2017–2018: Trapani (assistant)
- 2018–2020: Spezia U19
- * Club domestic league appearances and goals

Alessandro Pierini (Italian pronunciation: [alesˈsandro pjeˈriːni]; born 22 March 1973) is an Italian former footballer who played as a defender, and is the assistant manager of Trapani Calcio.

After playing for several clubs in his country, mainly Udinese, he finished his professional career in Spain, where he represented Racing de Santander and Córdoba.

Pierini won one cap for Italy, in 2001.

== Playing career ==
=== Club ===
Born in Viareggio in the Province of Lucca, Tuscany, Pierini began his professional career with Udinese, making his debut in 1991 and moving on loan to Fidelis Andria four years later. He joined Fiorentina in 1999 for 14 billion lire (€7.23 million), and turned down a move to English side West Ham United in the summer of 2001 for personal reasons, instead choosing to sign for Reggina after the bankruptcy of the Viola in 2002 and moving to Parma in January of the following year.

After a second spell with Udinese, Pierini moved to Spain at already 31, joining Racing de Santander. After only five La Liga matches he was released in the next transfer window and signed with Córdoba in Segunda División, being relegated in that season and promoting in his third, always as an undisputed starter.

=== International ===
Pierini made one appearance for the Italy national team, playing in the 1–2 friendly loss to Argentina at the Stadio Olimpico in Rome on 28 February 2001.

== Coaching career ==
In July 2009, with Córdoba consolidated in the second level, Pierini retired from playing at the age of 36, but stayed connected with his last club, immediately being named its assistant manager. In summer 2012, after one year with the reserves, he had his first head coach experience away from the Estadio Nuevo Arcángel, being appointed at amateurs Ronda.

Pierini returned to his homeland subsequently, where he was in charge of Serie D teams Camaiore and Viareggio 2014. In February 2017, he was appointed at fellow league side Fezzanese.

In July 2018, Pierini was hired as manager for Spezia's U-19 team. He was replaced by Valter Bonacina ahead of the 2020–21 season.

== Style of play ==
Pierini was a physically strong defender, with a powerful build and good technical ability.

== Personal life ==
Pierini's son, Nicholas, is also a professional footballer.

== Honours ==
Fiorentina

- Coppa Italia: 2000–01
