= Luigi Turci =

Italian footballer

Personal information
- Date of birth: 27 January 1970 (age 56)
- Place of birth: Cremona, Italy
- Height: 1.88 m (6 ft 2 in)
- Position: Goalkeeper

Team information
- Current team: AC Milan (goalkeeping coach)

Youth career
- 1987–1990: Cremonese

Senior career*
Years	Team	Apps	(Gls)
1990–1996	Cremonese	134	(0)
1990–1991	→ Treviso (loan)	33	(0)
1991–1992	→ Alessandria (loan)	34	(0)
1996–2002	Udinese	169	(0)
2002–2005	Sampdoria	38	(0)
2005–2007	Cesena	62	(0)
Total		470	(0)
- * Club domestic league appearances and goals

Luigi Turci (born 27 January 1970) is an Italian former professional footballer who played as a goalkeeper. He works as goalkeeping coach of AC Milan.

== Career ==
Turci started his career at native club Cremonese. After loaned to Treviso and Alessandria (Serie C1), he became Cremonese number 1 goalkeeper, and helped the team gain promotion to Serie A in 1993.

After Cremonese were relegated to Serie B in 1996, he joined Udinese of Serie A, still remaining the first choice goalkeeper of the team.

He moved again in 2002, this time to Sampdoria. He made 33 appearances during the 2002–03 Serie A season. However, following the arrival of Francesco Antonioli from Roma in 2003, Turci was forced to become the second choice goalkeeper, and made just five appearances in the next two seasons.

In 2005, he joined Cesena in Serie B for whom he played 62 league games before hanging up his boots in 2007.

Throughout his career, Turci played a total of 271 Serie A games between 1993 and 2004.

== Style of play ==
During his career, Turci stood out for his penalty–stopping abilities; he saved 12 spot kicks in 271 appearances over the course of his eleven seasons in the Italian top–flight, the joint–ninth–most penalties saved in Serie A history, alongside Emiliano Viviano, Massimo Taibi, and Giuseppe Taglialatela.

== Honours ==
Udinese

- UEFA Intertoto Cup: 2000
