= 1997–98 Serie A =

96th season of top-tier Italian football

Serie A
- Season: 1997–98
- Dates: 31 August 1997 – 16 May 1998
- Champions: Juventus; 25th title
- Relegated: Brescia; Atalanta; Lecce; Napoli
- Champions League: Juventus; Internazionale
- Cup Winners' Cup: Lazio
- UEFA Cup: Udinese; Fiorentina; Roma; Parma
- Intertoto Cup: Bologna; Sampdoria
- Matches: 306
- Goals: 835 (2.73 per match)
- Top goalscorer: Oliver Bierhoff (27 goals)

The 1997–98 Serie A saw Juventus win their 25th national title, with Internazionale placing second; both teams qualified for the 1998–99 UEFA Champions League. Udinese, Roma, Fiorentina, Parma qualified for the 1998–99 UEFA Cup. Lazio qualified for the UEFA Cup Winners Cup courtesy of winning the Coppa Italia. Bologna and Sampdoria qualified for the 1998 UEFA Intertoto Cup. Brescia, Atalanta, Lecce and Napoli were relegated to Serie B. The season was marked by controversy after a clear penalty claim for Internazionale was not awarded in a match that Juventus won 1–0; the decision drew widespread criticism and remains a notable incident of the campaign.

1997–98 Serie A team distribution

== Personnel and Sponsoring ==
Team	Head coach	Kit manufacturer	Shirt sponsor
Atalanta	(Italy) Emiliano Mondonico	Asics	Somet
Bari	(Italy) Eugenio Fascetti	Lotto	Gio.Bi. Trasporti
Bologna	(Italy) Renzo Ulivieri	Diadora	Granarolo
Brescia	(Italy) Edigio Salvi & (Italy) Adriano Bacconi	Erreà	Ristora
Empoli	(Italy) Luciano Spalletti	Erreà	Sammontana
Fiorentina	(Italy) Alberto Malesani	Fila	Nintendo
Internazionale	(Italy) Luigi Simoni	Umbro	Pirelli
Juventus	(Italy) Marcello Lippi	Kappa	Sony MiniDisc
Lazio	(Sweden) Sven-Göran Eriksson	Umbro	Cirio
Lecce	(Italy) Nedo Sonetti	Asics	Banca del Salento
Milan	(Italy) Fabio Capello	Lotto	Opel
Napoli	(Italy) Vincenzo Montefusco	Nike	Polenghi
Parma	(Italy) Carlo Ancelotti	Puma	Parmalat
Piacenza	(Italy) Vincenzo Guerini	Lotto	None
Roma	(Czech Republic) Zdeněk Zeman	Diadora	INA Assitalia
Sampdoria	(Federal Republic of Yugoslavia) Vujadin Boškov	Asics	Daewoo
Udinese	(Italy) Alberto Zaccheroni	Hummel	Atreyu
Vicenza	(Italy) Francesco Guidolin	Lotto	Pal Zileri

== Teams and stadiums ==
Team	Home city	Stadium	Capacity
Atalanta	Bergamo	Stadio Atleti Azzurri d'Italia	26,542
Bari*	Bari	Stadio San Nicola	58,270
Bologna	Bologna	Stadio Renato Dall'Ara	38,279
Brescia*	Brescia	Stadio Mario Rigamonti	16,308
Empoli*	Empoli	Stadio Carlo Castellani	19,795
Fiorentina	Florence	Stadio Artemio Franchi	47,282
Internazionale	Milan	San Siro	80,074
Juventus	Turin	Stadio delle Alpi	69,295
Lazio	Rome	Stadio Olimpico	72,698
Lecce*	Lecce	Stadio Via del Mare	33,876
Milan	Milan	San Siro	80,018
Napoli	Naples	Stadio San Paolo	60,240
Parma	Parma	Stadio Ennio Tardini	27,906
Piacenza	Piacenza	Stadio Leonardo Garilli	27,906
Roma	Rome	Stadio Olimpico	72,698
Sampdoria	Genoa	Stadio Luigi Ferraris	36,685
Udinese	Udine	Stadio Friuli^{2}	30,642
Vicenza	Vicenza	Stadio Romeo Menti	17,163

(*) Promoted from Serie B.

== League table ==
Pos	Team	Pld	W	D	L	GF	GA	GD	Pts	Qualification or relegation
1	Juventus (C)	34	21	11	2	67	28	+39	74	Qualification to Champions League group stage
2	Internazionale	34	21	6	7	62	27	+35	69	Qualification to Champions League second qualifying round
3	Udinese	34	19	7	8	62	40	+22	64	Qualification to UEFA Cup
4	Roma	34	16	11	7	67	42	+25	59	Qualification to UEFA Cup
5	Fiorentina	34	15	12	7	65	36	+29	57 (Note: Fiorentina finished ahead of Parma on head-to-head points: FIO 1–1 PAR; PAR 1–2 FIO.)	Qualification to UEFA Cup
6	Parma	34	15	12	7	55	39	+16	57	Qualification to UEFA Cup
7	Lazio	34	16	8	10	53	30	+23	56	Qualification to Cup Winners' Cup
8	Bologna	34	12	12	10	55	46	+9	48 (Note: Bologna finished ahead of Sampdoria on head-to-head points: BOL 2–2 SAM; SAM 2–3 BOL.)	Qualification to Intertoto Cup third round
9	Sampdoria	34	13	9	12	52	55	−3	48	Qualification to Intertoto Cup second round
10	Milan	34	11	11	12	37	43	−6	44	
11	Bari	34	10	8	16	30	45	−15	38	
12	Piacenza	34	7	16	11	29	38	−9	37	
13	Empoli	34	10	7	17	50	58	−8	37	
14	Vicenza	34	9	9	16	36	61	−25	36	
15	Brescia (R)	34	9	8	17	45	63	−18	35	Relegation to Serie B
16	Atalanta (R)	34	7	11	16	25	48	−23	32	Relegation to Serie B
17	Lecce (R)	34	6	8	20	32	72	−40	26	Relegation to Serie B
18	Napoli (R)	34	2	8	24	25	76	−51	14	Relegation to Serie B

Source: 1997–98 Serie A, RSSSF.com, Soccerway
Rules for classification: 1) Points; 2) Head-to-head points; 3) Head-to-head goal difference; 4) Goal difference; 5) Goals scored; 6) Draw. (Note: Head-to-head record is used only after all the matches between the teams in question have been played).
(C) Champions; (R) Relegated

== Results ==
Home \ Away	ATA	BAR	BOL	BRE	EMP	FIO	INT	JUV	LAZ	LCE	MIL	NAP	PAR	PIA	ROM	SAM	UDI	VIC
Atalanta		2–0	4–2	0–1	1–0	1–0	1–2	1–1	0–0	0–0	1–2	1–0	0–0	2–2	0–1	0–2	1–1	1–3
Bari	0–0		0–0	2–1	2–0	0–1	2–1	0–5	0–2	2–2	1–0	2–0	0–2	0–0	1–3	0–1	0–0	0–0
Bologna	0–0	4–3		2–1	2–2	2–2	2–4	1–3	2–1	2–0	3–0	5–1	1–2	3–0	0–0	2–2	2–0	3–1
Brescia	2–2	1–1	1–3		3–1	1–3	0–1	1–1	1–1	3–2	2–2	2–1	2–1	2–0	1–1	3–3	0–4	4–0
Empoli	1–0	2–3	0–0	3–1		1–1	1–1	0–1	1–0	5–1	0–1	5–0	2–0	2–3	1–3	4–1	1–0	3–2
Fiorentina	5–0	3–1	1–1	5–1	1–2		1–1	3–0	1–3	5–0	2–0	4–0	1–1	1–1	0–0	1–1	1–0	1–1
Internazionale	4–0	0–1	0–1	2–1	4–1	3–2		1–0	1–1	5–0	2–2	2–0	1–0	0–0	3–0	3–0	2–0	2–1
Juventus	3–1	1–0	3–2	4–0	5–2	2–1	1–0		2–1	2–0	4–1	2–2	2–2	2–0	3–1	3–0	4–1	2–0
Lazio	0–2	3–2	1–0	1–0	3–1	1–4	3–0	0–1		4–0	2–1	2–0	1–2	0–0	2–0	3–0	2–3	4–0
Lecce	1–1	0–1	1–1	2–0	2–2	1–1	1–5	0–2	1–0		0–0	2–0	0–2	1–3	1–3	1–3	1–2	0–1
Milan	3–0	2–0	0–0	2–1	3–1	0–2	0–3	1–1	1–1	1–2		0–0	1–1	1–0	0–0	1–0	0–0	0–1
Napoli	0–1	2–2	0–0	0–3	2–1	1–1	0–2	1–2	0–0	2–4	1–2		0–4	1–2	0–2	0–2	1–3	2–0
Parma	2–2	1–0	2–0	1–3	2–0	1–2	1–0	2–2	1–1	2–1	3–1	3–1		1–1	0–2	2–2	4–0	2–1
Piacenza	3–0	0–1	0–0	0–0	0–0	0–0	0–1	1–1	0–0	1–0	1–1	1–0	1–3		3–3	1–0	0–2	1–1
Roma	3–0	2–1	2–1	5–0	4–3	4–1	1–2	0–0	1–3	3–1	5–0	6–2	2–2	1–1		2–0	1–2	2–2
Sampdoria	2–0	1–0	2–3	2–1	3–0	2–0	1–1	1–1	0–4	1–1	0–3	6–3	5–2	3–1	1–1		0–3	2–1
Udinese	1–0	2–0	4–3	3–1	2–2	2–3	1–0	1–1	0–2	6–0	2–1	1–1	1–1	2–0	4–2	3–2		3–0
Vicenza	1–0	1–2	3–2	2–1	1–0	1–5	1–3	0–0	2–1	1–3	1–4	1–1	0–0	3–2	1–1	1–1	1–3	

Source: lega-calcio.it (in Italian)
Legend: Blue = home team win; Yellow = draw; Red = away team win.

== Top goalscorers ==
Rank	Player	Club	Goals
1	(Germany) Oliver Bierhoff	Udinese	27
2	(Brazil) Ronaldo	Internazionale	25
3	(Italy) Roberto Baggio	Bologna	22
4	(Argentina) Gabriel Batistuta	Fiorentina	21
4	(Italy) Alessandro Del Piero	Juventus	21
6	(Italy) Vincenzo Montella	Sampdoria	20
7	(Italy) Filippo Inzaghi	Juventus	18
8	(Italy) Dario Hübner	Brescia	16
9	(Belgium) Luís Oliveira	Fiorentina	15
10	(Argentina) Abel Balbo	Roma	14
10	(Italy) Carmine Esposito	Empoli	14

=== Hat-tricks ===
Player	Club	Against	Result	Date
(Argentina) Gabriel Batistuta	Fiorentina	Udinese	3-2	31 August 1997
(Italy) Dario Hübner	Brescia	Sampdoria	3-3	13 September 1997
(Argentina) Abel Balbo	Roma	Napoli	6-2	5 October 1997
(Italy) Roberto Baggio	Bologna	Napoli	5-1	2 November 1997
(Italy) Alessandro Del Piero	Juventus	Empoli	5-2	21 December 1997
(Italy) Vincenzo Montella	Sampdoria	Napoli	6-3	21 December 1997
(Brazil) Ronaldo	Internazionale	Lecce	5-0	15 February 1998
(Sweden) Kennet Andersson	Bologna	Sampdoria	3-2	29 March 1998
(Liberia) George Weah	Milan	Atalanta	3-0	11 April 1998
(Italy) Filippo Inzaghi	Juventus	Bologna	3-2	10 May 1998

== Attendances ==
#	Club	Avg. attendance
1	Internazionale	67,825
2	AC Milan	54,432
3	AS Roma	52,813
4	Juventus FC	47,347
5	SS Lazio	46,058
6	SSC Napoli	37,600
7	ACF Fiorentina	34,174
8	Bologna FC	32,270
9	AS Bari	26,415
10	UC Sampdoria	24,482
11	Udinese Calcio	23,492
12	Parma AC	22,385
13	Atalanta BC	18,709
14	US Lecce	17,097
15	Vicenza Calcio	17,004
16	Brescia Calcio	13,779
17	Empoli FC	12,523
18	Piacenza Calcio	12,477

== References and sources ==
- Almanacco Illustrato del Calcio - La Storia 1898-2004, Panini Edizioni, Modena, September 2005
