= 2004–05 Udinese Calcio season =

Udinese Calcio
2004–05 season
- President: Giampaolo Pozzo
- Manager: Luciano Spalletti
- Stadium: Stadio Friuli
- Serie A: 4th
- Coppa Italia: Semi-finals
- UEFA Cup: First round
- Top goalscorer: Vincenzo Iaquinta (13)
- Average home league attendance: 16,447
Home colours	Away colours	Third colours

Udinese Calcio had its most successful season for seven years, in which it reached the Champions League thanks to a stable fundament in the team, with several players attractive for bigger clubs. Following the season, coach Luciano Spalletti left to take over Roma, while playmaker David Pizarro was sold to Inter.

== Players ==
=== Goalkeepers ===
- (Italy) Morgan De Sanctis
- (Italy) Adriano Bonaiuti
- (Slovenia) Samir Handanovič

=== Defenders ===
- (Italy) Valerio Bertotto
- (Argentina) Néstor Sensini
- (Brazil) Felipe
- (Italy) Mirko Pieri
- (Italy) Manuel Belleri
- (Brazil) Cribari
- (Czech Republic) Marek Jankulovski
- (Denmark) Per Krøldrup

=== Midfielders ===
- (Italy) Damiano Zenoni
- (Italy) Giampiero Pinzi
- (Argentina) Fernando Tissone
- (Ghana) Sulley Muntari
- (Italy) Stefano Mauri
- (Italy) Michele Pazienza
- (Chile) David Pizarro
- (Brazil) Alberto

=== Forwards ===
- (Italy) Vincenzo Iaquinta
- (Italy) Antonio Di Natale
- (Italy) David Di Michele
- (Italy) Dino Fava
- (Sweden) Henok Goitom

== Competitions ==
=== Serie A ===
==== League table ====
Pos	Team	Pld	W	D	L	GF	GA	GD	Pts	Qualification or relegation
2	Milan	38	23	10	5	63	28	+35	79	Qualification to Champions League group stage
3	Internazionale	38	18	18	2	65	37	+28	72	Qualification to Champions League third qualifying round
4	Udinese	38	17	11	10	56	40	+16	62	Qualification to Champions League third qualifying round
5	Sampdoria	38	17	10	11	42	29	+13	61	Qualification to UEFA Cup first round
6	Palermo	38	12	17	9	48	44	+4	53	Qualification to UEFA Cup first round

Source: 2004–05 Serie A, RSSSF.com, Soccerway
Rules for classification: 1) Points; 2) Head-to-head points; 3) Head-to-head goal difference; 4) Goal difference; 5) Goals scored; 6) Draw. (Note: Head-to-head record is used only after all the matches between the teams in question have been played).

==== Matches ====
- Reggina-Udinese 0–0
- Udinese-Parma 4–0
- 1–0 Antonio Di Natale (15)
- 2–0 Marek Jankulovski (74 pen)
- 3–0 David Di Michele (76)
- 4–0 Dino Fava (90 + 2)
- Chievo-Udinese 0–0
- Udinese-Brescia 1–2
- 0–1 Andrea Caracciolo (8 pen)
- 1–1 David Di Michele (57)
- 1–2 Daniele Mannini (77)
- Udinese-Juventus 0–1
- 0–1 Marcelo Zalayeta (60)
- Inter-Udinese 3–1
- 1–0 Adriano (7)
- 2–0 Adriano (11)
- 2–1 Stefano Mauri (50)
- 3–1 Christian Vieri (57)
- Udinese-Fiorentina 2–2
- 0–1 Fabrizio Miccoli (15)
- 1–1 Stefano Mauri (17)
- 2–1 Néstor Sensini (51)
- 2–2 Fabrizio Miccoli (66)
- Bologna-Udinese 0–1
- 0–1 Dino Fava (55)
- Udinese-Palermo 1–0
- 1–0 Stefano Mauri (59)
- Lecce-Udinese 3–4
- 1–0 Valeri Bojinov (35)
- 1–1 Marek Jankulovski (44)
- 2–1 Valeri Bojinov (57)
- 2–2 Antonio Di Natale (72)
- 2–3 Vincenzo Iaquinta (78)
- 3–3 Mirko Vučinić (89)
- 3–4 Marek Jankulovski (90 + 2 pen)
- Roma-Udinese 0–3
- 0–1 Vincenzo Iaquinta (44)
- 0–2 David Pizarro (60 pen)
- 0–3 Vincenzo Iaquinta (83)
- Udinese-Reggina 1–1
- 0–1 Nicola Amoruso (12)
- 1–1 David Di Michele (54)
- Livorno-Udinese 1–2
- 0–1 Vincenzo Iaquinta (13)
- 0–2 David Di Michele (53)
- 1–2 Cristiano Lucarelli (65)
- Udinese-Siena 1–0
- 1–0 Antonio Di Natale (16)
- Atalanta-Udinese 0–1
- 0–1 Vincenzo Iaquinta (8)
- Udinese-Lazio 3–0
- 1–0 David Pizarro (13 pen)
- 2–0 David Di Michele (17)
- 3–0 Vincenzo Iaquinta (36)
- Sampdoria-Udinese 2–0
- 1–0 Francesco Flachi (68)
- 2–0 Marcello Castellini (75)
- Udinese-Cagliari 2–0
- 1–0 Antonio Di Natale (23)
- 2–0 Francesco Pisano (59 og)
- Milan-Udinese 3–1
- 0–1 Antonio Di Natale (9)
- 1–1 Andriy Shevchenko (31)
- 2–1 Marek Jankulovski (53 og)
- 3–1 Kaká (90)
- Udinese-Reggina 0–2
- 0–1 Emiliano Bonazzoli (40)
- 0–2 Marco Borriello (90 + 1)
- Parma-Udinese 1–0
- 1–0 Alberto Gilardino (35)
- Udinese-Chievo 3–0
- 1–0 Marek Jankulovski (47)
- 2–0 Fabio Moro (52 og)
- 3–0 Vincenzo Iaquinta (82)
- Brescia-Udinese 0–1
- 0–1 Vincenzo Iaquinta (84)
- Juventus-Udinese 2–1
- 1–0 Zlatan Ibrahimović (1)
- 2–0 Mauro Camoranesi (49)
- 2–1 David Di Michele (90 + 2)
- Udinese-Inter 1–1
- 0–1 Juan Sebastián Verón (58)
- 1–1 Henok Goitom (90 + 1)
- Fiorentina-Udinese 2–2
- 1–0 Valeri Bojinov (22)
- 2–0 Luca Ariatti (34)
- 2–1 Sulley Muntari (41)
- 2–2 Antonio Di Natale (56)
- Udinese-Bologna 0–1
- 0–1 Igli Tare (4)
- Parma-Udinese 1–5
- 0–1 David Di Michele (29)
- 0–2 David Di Michele (36)
- 0–3 Sulley Muntari (45 + 2)
- 0–4 David Di Michele (54)
- 1–4 Mario Alberto Santana (70)
- 1–5 Vincenzo Iaquinta (82)
- Udinese-Lecce 2–1
- 0–1 Alex Pinardi (31)
- 1–1 David Di Michele (41)
- 2–1 David Di Michele (88)
- Udinese-Roma 3–3
- 0–1 Christian Chivu (14)
- 0–2 Vincenzo Montella (23)
- 1–2 Antonio Di Natale (28)
- 2–2 Giampiero Pinzi (33)
- 2–3 Mancini (44)
- 3–3 David Di Michele (76)
- Messina-Udinese 1–0
- 1–0 Ivica Iliev (63)
- Udinese-Livorno 1–1
- 1–0 Stefano Mauri (8)
- 1–1 Cristiano Lucarelli (85)
- Siena-Udinese 2–3
- 0–1 David Di Michele (6)
- 1–1 Massimo Maccarone (9)
- 1–2 David Di Michele (53)
- 2–2 Rodrigo Taddei (57)
- 2–3 Vincenzo Iaquinta (66)
- Udinese-Atalanta 2–1
- 1–0 Stefano Mauri (2)
- 1–1 Andrea Lazzari (4)
- 2–1 Vincenzo Iaquinta (36)
- Lazio-Udinese 0–1
- 0–1 Vincenzo Iaquinta (65)
- Udinese-Sampdoria 1–1
- 0–1 Marcello Castellini (25)
- 1–1 Marco Pisano (36 og)
- Cagliari-Udinese 1–1
- 0–1 Vincenzo Iaquinta (3)
- 1–1 Mauro Esposito (67)
- Udinese-Milan 1–1
- 1–0 David Di Michele (56)
- 1–1 Serginho (88)

== Statistics ==
=== Goalscorers ===
- (Italy) Vincenzo Iaquinta 13
- (Italy) David Di Michele 15
- (Italy) Antonio Di Natale 7
- (Italy) Stefano Mauri 4
