= 2003–04 Udinese Calcio season =

Udinese Calcio
2003–04 season
- Chairman: Giampaolo Pozzo
- Manager: Luciano Spalletti
- Stadium: Stadio Friuli
- Serie A: 7th
- Coppa Italia: Quarter-finals
- UEFA Cup: First round
- Top goalscorer: Dino Fava (12)
- Highest home attendance: 29,819 (vs. Milan, 25 April 2004)
- Average home league attendance: 17,642
Home colours	Away colours	Third colours

During the 2003–04 Italian football season, Udinese Calcio competed in the Serie A. The team finished in seventh place in the final table.

== Kit ==
Udinese's kit was manufactured by French sports retailer Le Coq Sportif and sponsored by Bernardi.

== Serie A ==
Pos	Team	Pld	W	D	L	GF	GA	GD	Pts	Qualification or relegation
5	Parma	34	16	10	8	57	46	+11	58	Qualification to UEFA Cup first round
6	Lazio	34	16	8	10	52	38	+14	56	Qualification to UEFA Cup first round
7	Udinese (Note: Udinese gained entry to the 2004–05 UEFA Cup as Coppa Italia because both finalists Lazio and Juventus qualified for the 2004–05 UEFA Cup and the 2004–05 UEFA Champions League through league position, respectively.)	34	13	11	10	44	40	+4	50	Qualification to UEFA Cup first round
8	Sampdoria	34	11	13	10	40	42	−2	46	
9	Chievo	34	11	11	12	36	37	−1	44	

Source: Almanacco Illustrato del Calcio – La Storia 1898-2004, Panini Edizioni, Modena, September 2005
Rules for classification: 1) points; 2) tiebreaker for relevant positions 3) head-to-head points and goal difference; 4) head-to-head goals scored; 5) goal difference; 6) number of goals scored.

== Squad ==
=== Goalkeepers ===
- (Italy) Adriano Bonaiuti
- (Italy) Morgan De Sanctis
- (Belgium) Olivier Renard

=== Defenders ===
- (Italy) Valerio Bertotto
- (Brazil) Felipe
- (Denmark) Per Krøldrup
- (Italy) Alessandro Pierini
- (Argentina) Nestor Sensini

=== Midfielders ===
- (Brazil) Alberto
- (Argentina) Lucas Castroman
- (Paraguay) Diego Gavilan
- (Czech Republic) Marek Jankulovski
- (Denmark) Martin Jørgensen
- (Ghana) Sulley Ali Muntari
- (Italy) Michele Pazienza
- (Italy) Mirko Pieri
- (Italy) Giampiero Pinzi
- (Chile) David Pizarro
- (Italy) Fabio Rossitto

=== Attackers ===
- (Italy) Dino Fava
- (Sweden) Henok Goitom
- (Italy) Vincenzo Iaquinta
- (Germany) Carsten Jancker
- (South Africa) Siyabonga Nomvethe
