= 2002–03 Udinese Calcio season =

Udinese Calcio
2002–03 season
- Chairman: Giampaolo Pozzo
- Manager: Luciano Spalletti
- Serie A: 6th
- Coppa Italia: Second Round
- Top goalscorer: Vincenzo Iaquinta; David Pizarro (7)
| Home colours | Away colours | Third colours |

Udinese Calcio bounced back from the hugely disappointing 2001–02 Serie A season, in which it only just managed to avoid relegation. Under new coach Luciano Spalletti, Udinese gathered strength, and was a constant feature on the top half of the league table. Even though the squad lacked the goalscoring punch, the defence led by Néstor Sensini and surprising goalkeeper Morgan De Sanctis held it together to such a degree it finished sixth in the league. Also Czech signing Marek Jankulovski impressed, the Napoli signing switching form left-wing to left back, causing interest from several bigger clubs. In the offence, Udinese's most influential player was David Pizarro, who scored seven times from the midfield and grabbed the attention from Lazio, who tried to sign him and teammate Martin Jørgensen immediately after the season had finished. Undisclosed Lazio players refused moving to Udine as compensation for the transfers, and both stayed on, much to the relief of Spalletti.

== Squad ==
=== Goalkeepers ===
- (Italy) Morgan De Sanctis
- (Italy) Adriano Bonaiuti
- (Belgium) Olivier Renard

=== Defenders ===
- (Italy) Valerio Bertotto
- (Argentina) Néstor Sensini
- (Brazil) Felipe
- (Italy) Mirko Pieri
- (Czech Republic) Marek Jankulovski
- (Denmark) Per Krøldrup
- (Ghana) Mohammed Gargo
- (Italy) Thomas Manfredini
- (Belgium) Régis Genaux
- (Honduras) Samuel Caballero
- (Italy) Andrea Sottil

=== Midfielders ===
- (Italy) Giampiero Pinzi
- (Ghana) Sulley Muntari
- (Chile) David Pizarro
- (Brazil) Alberto
- (Germany) Giuseppe Gemiti
- (Denmark) Martin Jørgensen
- (Italy) Fabio Rossitto
- (Argentina) Sergio Almirón

=== Attackers ===
- (Italy) Vincenzo Iaquinta
- (Germany) Carsten Jancker
- (South Africa) Siyabonga Nomvethe
- (Italy) Roberto Muzzi
- (Denmark) Thomas Thorninger
- (Brazil) Warley

== Serie A ==
| Pos | Team | Pld | W | D | L | GF | GA | GD | Pts | Qualification or relegation |
|---|---|---|---|---|---|---|---|---|---|---|
| 4 | Lazio | 34 | 15 | 15 | 4 | 57 | 32 | +25 | 60 | Qualification to Champions League third qualifying round |
| 5 | Parma | 34 | 15 | 11 | 8 | 55 | 36 | +19 | 56 (Note: Parma finished ahead of Udinese on head-to-head points: Udinese 1–1 Parma, Parma 3–2 Udinese.) | Qualification to UEFA Cup first round |
| 6 | Udinese | 34 | 16 | 8 | 10 | 38 | 35 | +3 | 56 | Qualification to UEFA Cup first round |
| 7 | Chievo | 34 | 16 | 7 | 11 | 51 | 39 | +12 | 55 | |
| 8 | Roma (Note: Roma qualified for the first round of the 2003-04 UEFA Cup as Coppa Italia runner-up because the winner, Milan, qualified for Champions League through championship position.) | 34 | 13 | 10 | 11 | 55 | 46 | +9 | 49 | Qualification to UEFA Cup first round |

Source: 2002–03 Serie A, Soccerway
Rules for classification: 1) Points; 2) Head-to-head points; 3) Head-to-head goal difference; 4) Goal difference; 5) Goals scored; 6) Draw. (Note: Head-to-head record is used only after all the matches between the teams in question have been played).

=== Games ===
- Udinese-Parma 1–1
- 0–1 Adriano (24)
- 1–1 Alberto (54)
- Piacenza-Udinese 2–0
- 1–0 Dario Hübner (26)
- 2–0 Enzo Maresca (88)
- Udinese-Atalanta 1–0
- 1–0 Néstor Sensini (60)
- Roma-Udinese 4–1
- 1–0 Vincenzo Montella (23)
- 1–1 Néstor Sensini (59)
- 2–1 Gabriel Batistuta (76)
- 3–1 Francesco Totti (81)
- 4–1 Francesco Totti (89)
- Udinese-Reggina 1–0
- 1–0 David Pizarro (51 pen)
- Juventus-Udinese 1–0
- 1–0 Marcelo Salas (49)
- Udinese-Bologna 0–0
- Milan-Udinese 1–0
- 1–0 Rivaldo (89)
- Inter-Udinese 1–2
- 1–0 Christian Vieri (3)
- 1–1 Martin Jørgensen (25)
- 1–2 Roberto Muzzi (55)
- Udinese-Chievo 2–1
- 1–0 Martin Jørgensen (13)
- 2–0 Carsten Jancker (27)
- 2–1 Oliver Bierhoff (48)
- Brescia-Udinese 1–1
- 0–1 Martin Jørgensen (8)
- 1–1 Néstor Sensini (68 og)
- Udinese-Empoli 2–1
- 1–0 David Pizarro (16 pen)
- 1–1 Ighli Vannucchi (23)
- 2–1 Vincenzo Iaquinta (90 + 1 pen)
- Udinese-Torino 1–1
- 1–0 Vincenzo Iaquinta (55)
- 1–1 Cristiano Lucarelli (58)
- Como-Udinese 0–2
- 0–1 Giampiero Pinzi (34)

The match was abandoned due to Como fans rioting against a third penalty for Udinese in the match. Following previous misses by Vincenzo Iaquinta and Roberto Muzzi; David Pizarro was set to take the third one, but the riots ended the match prematurely. Udinese was handed the win 2–0, with Pinzi as the only goalscorer. Como was given a four-match suspension from playing at home.

- Modena-Udinese 0–1
- 0–1 Giampiero Pinzi (24)
- Udinese-Perugia 0–0
- Lazio-Udinese 2–1
- 1–0 Claudio López (27)
- 1–1 Roberto Muzzi (40)
- 2–1 Stefano Fiore (45 + 1)
- Udinese-Milan 1–0
- 1–0 David Pizarro (37 pen)
- Parma-Udinese 3–2
- 1–0 Adriano (11)
- 2–0 Simone Barone (56)
- 2–1 David Pizarro (57)
- 3–1 Hidetoshi Nakata (85)
- 3–2 Marek Jankulovski (90 + 2)
- Udinese-Piacenza 2–1
- 1–0 Marek Jankulovski (18)
- 1–1 Dario Hübner (77)
- 2–1 Roberto Muzzi (84)
- Atalanta-Udinese 0–0
- Udinese-Roma 2–1
- 1–0 Néstor Sensini (32)
- 1–1 Vincenzo Montella (54)
- 2–1 Vincenzo Iaquinta (72)
- Reggina-Udinese 3–2
- 1–0 Emiliano Bonazzoli (3)
- 1–1 David Pizarro (8 pen)
- 2–1 David Di Michele (12)
- 2–2 Vincenzo Iaquinta (45)
- 3–2 Francesco Cozza (65)
- Udinese-Juventus 0–1
- 0–1 David Trezeguet (84)
- Bologna-Udinese 1–0
- 1–0 Giuseppe Signori (9)
- Udinese-Inter 2–1
- 1–0 Roberto Muzzi (48)
- 2–0 Vincenzo Iaquinta (59)
- 2–1 Iván Córdoba (73)
- Chievo-Udinese 3–0
- 1–0 Sasa Bjelanović (10)
- 2–0 Federico Cossato (37)
- 3–0 Sergio Pellissier (68)
- Udinese-Brescia 0–0
- Udinese-Como 3–2
- 1–0 Marek Jankulovski (45)
- 1–1 Fabio Pecchia (58)
- 1–2 Vedin Musić (62)
- 2–2 Giampiero Pinzi (74)
- 3–2 Vincenzo Iaquinta (87)
- Empoli-Udinese 1–1
- 0–1 Giampiero Pinzi (56)
- 1–1 Antonio Di Natale (86)
- Torino-Udinese 0–1
- 0–1 Vincenzo Iaquinta (81)
- Udinese-Modena 2–1
- 0–1 Diomansy Kamara (40)
- 1–1 David Pizarro (43 pen)
- 2–1 Roberto Muzzi (62)
- Perugia-Udinese 0–2
- 0–1 Marek Jankulovski (60)
- 0–2 Martin Jørgensen (87)
- Udinese-Lazio 2–1
- 1–0 David Pizarro (67 pen)
- 2–0 Marek Jankulovski (83)
- 2–1 Claudio López (86 pen)
