= Sulley Muntari =

Ghanaian footballer (born 1984)

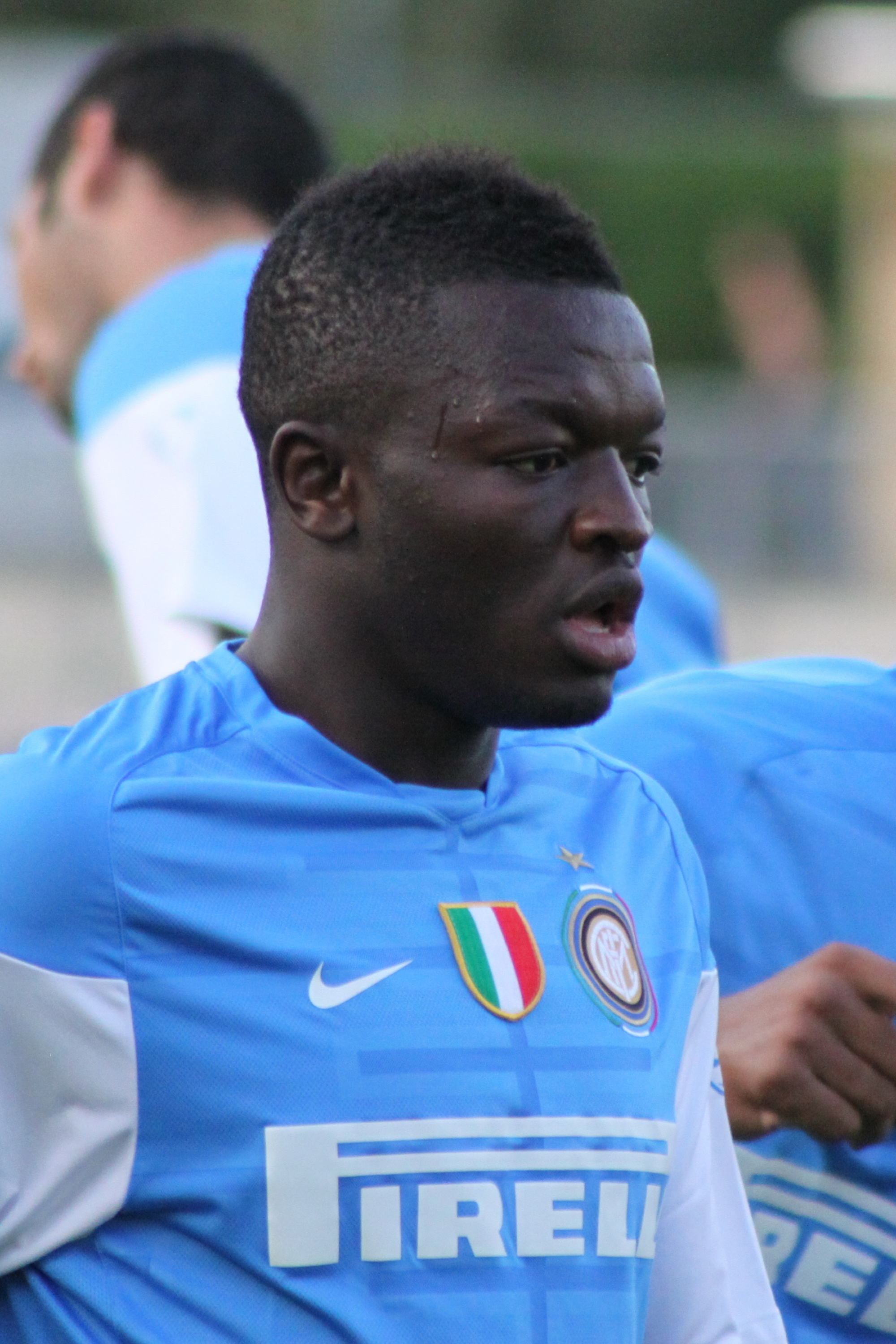
- Muntari with Inter Milan in 2009

Personal information
- Full name: Sulley Ali Muntari
- Date of birth: 27 August 1984 (age 42)
- Place of birth: Konongo, Ashanti, Ghana
- Height: 1.79 m (5 ft 10 in)
- Position: Midfielder

Youth career
- 2000–2001: Liberty Professionals
- 2001–2002: Udinese

Senior career*
Years	Team	Apps	(Gls)
2002–2007	Udinese	125	(8)
2007–2008	Portsmouth	29	(4)
2008–2012	Inter Milan	66	(7)
2011	→ Sunderland (loan)	9	(1)
2012	→ AC Milan (loan)	13	(3)
2012–2015	AC Milan	57	(8)
2015–2016	Al Ittihad	18	(2)
2017	Pescara	9	(1)
2018	Deportivo La Coruña	8	(0)
2019	Albacete	2	(0)
2022	Hearts of Oak	11	(1)
Total		347	(35)

International career
2001	Ghana U20	7	(0)
2002–2014	Ghana	84	(20)
Medal record
Representing Ghana
Men's football
Africa Cup of Nations
Third place	2008
- * Club domestic league appearances and goals as of 20:00, 10 June 2022 (UTC)

Sulley Ali Muntari (born 27 August 1984) is a Ghanaian former professional footballer who played as a midfielder. He spent most of his career in Italy, playing for clubs such as Udinese, Inter Milan, and AC Milan.

Spoken about as a talented footballer at a young age, Muntari started his youth career in Ghana with Liberty Professionals before joining Udinese where he progressed from their academy into becoming a first team player. He featured in over 150 matches for Udinese and scored 9 goals before securing a move to join English team Portsmouth then English Premier League. He spent only a season with the Pompey and was also part of the team that won the FA Cup in 2007–08.

His performance in the Premier League and the FA Cup earned him a move to join Inter Milan in 2008. During his time with Inter Milan, he helped the team win the Champions League in 2009–10 and the Serie A title in 2008–09 and 2009–10 among other trophies.

After becoming a full international in 2002, Muntari earned over 80 caps for the Ghana national team and was selected for two Africa Cup of Nations tournaments and three FIFA World Cups. He was also a member of the Ghana U20 team that placed second in the African Youth Championship and FIFA U-20 World Cup both in 2001.

He is the elder brother of former Tambov player Sulley Muniru.

== Club career ==
=== Early career ===
Muntari's abilities first came to light in youth tournaments, while he was playing for Liberty Professionals youth team. He became a regular member of Ghana under-20 team at the age of 16 as they finished runners-up at the 2001 FIFA World Youth Championship in Argentina, losing out to the hosts in the final. Despite impressing during a trial with Manchester United after the tournament, he ended up joining Italian club Udinese.

=== Udinese ===
He joined Udinese in 2001, where his first season was spent in the reserves. He made his first-team debut on 6 November 2002, against Milan.

In his second full season, he made 23 appearances, and increased his standing to 33 appearances the following season, although indiscipline saw him sent off three times in 16 matches in the 2006–07 season. He left Udinese for Portsmouth after five seasons in Italy.

=== Portsmouth ===
Muntari had already indicated a desire to move to the English Premier League, when in early 2007 transfer bids were received from Portsmouth. He eventually opted for Portsmouth and transferred on 30 May 2007, for a new club record fee, believed to be around £7.1 million, signing a five-year contract.

He was a regular member of the first XI throughout the 2007–08 season, playing 29 League matches and scoring four goals. He made his Premier league debut on the opening match-day on 11 August 2007 in Pompey's 2–2 away draw against Derby County. On 29 September, Muntari scored his first goal and provided an assist in a thrilling 7–4 victory over Reading. Muntari scored the seventh goal of the match from the penalty spot in stoppage time after Kranjcar was fouled by Rosenior. The scoreline set a record as the highest scoring match in Premier League history. His skill, tenacity and football ability were praised for his performance in this match. On 24 November, Muntari scored his second league goal against Birmingham help Portsmouth to a 2–0 victory. He scored against his Ghanaian compatriot Richard Kingson, who was making his Premier League debut in goal for the Blues.

His performance of note was away at Aston Villa where he scored two spectacular long-range goals. He also played four FA Cup matches, scoring the winner from the penalty spot in a 1–0 victory over Manchester United at Old Trafford in the Sixth round of the FA Cup. His winner led to their progress into the semi-finals. He was in the starting XI that won the 2008 FA Cup Final at Wembley Stadium over Cardiff City. He left Fratton Park after one season to join Inter Milan.

=== Inter Milan ===
On 2 March 2007, it was reported in the Italian press that Inter Milan were preparing a summer offer for the midfielder. Injuries to Esteban Cambiasso and Patrick Vieira underlined just how short of ball-winning midfielders the Nerazzurri were, and they would be looking to remedy the problem in June 2007. Transfer consultants Marco Branca and Gabriele Oriali were looking around Europe for possible options and Muntari seemed to be their man at the insistence of coach Roberto Mancini, although Muntari ultimately went to Portsmouth in the summer of 2007. On 21 July 2008, however, Italian newspaper La Repubblica reported that with the probable failure of new Inter coach José Mourinho to land his former Chelsea midfielder Frank Lampard, Muntari was now his top target central midfield target. The reports gathered pace in the Italian press in the next few days that Muntari had already agreed a four-year contract with Inter. In an interview in 2022, he revealed that he agreed to sign after Mourinho called him and asked if he wanted to play for him, to which he replied yes.

But Portsmouth manager Harry Redknapp told Sky Sports News, "I don't want to sell him. He is one of my best players and is a terrific young talent" when quizzed about Inter's supposed interest in Muntari. On 24 July 2008, the BBC and Gazzetta dello Sport reported that Muntari would complete a €14 million plus bonuses move to Inter. He finally completed his move to Inter on 28 July 2008 and wore the number 20 jersey, previously worn by Álvaro Recoba for many years.

==== 2008–09 season ====
On 24 August, Muntari made his competitive debut for Inter Milan in the club's victory over Roma in the Italian Super Cup. He scored the first goal with the match ending in a 2–2 draw after extra time before Inter won the trophy on penalties.

On 22 November 2008, Muntari scored the winner, redirecting a wayward Zlatan Ibrahimović shot, in the Derby d'Italia against rivals Juventus. The victory was Inter's first victory over Juventus at San Siro after four years. Two weeks later, Muntari scored a backheel goal against Napoli at the San Siro after a great cross from Maicon, a match that ended 2–1 for Inter. In the very last Serie A match of the season, on 31 May 2009 against Atalanta, he opened the scoring for Inter after blasting in a Luís Figo cross from outside the penalty box. Later, his shot on goal was parried by the goalkeeper, but Esteban Cambiasso scored from the rebound to make the score 3–3. Inter eventually won 4–3 and Muntari won his first Scudetto after his first season with the club.

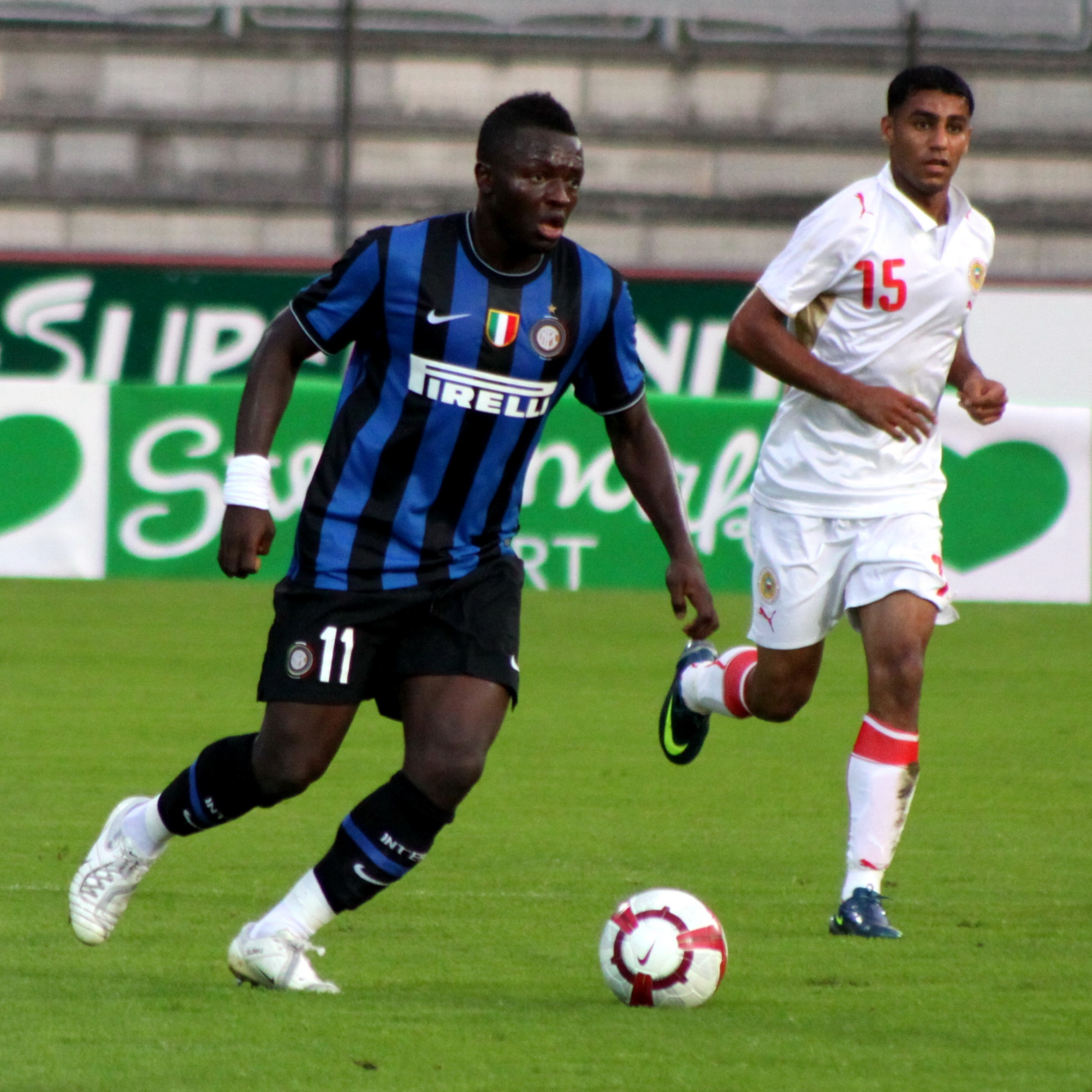
Muntari playing for Inter in 2009

==== 2009–10 season ====
Ahead of the 2009–10 season, Muntari was assigned the number 11 jersey. On 2 August 2009, Muntari featured for 84 minutes in the 2–1 2009 Supercoppa Italiana loss to Lazio. On 23 August, on the opening match day of the season, he came on to play 29 minutes of their 1–1 draw to Bari. He started his first Serie A match of the season, in their 2–1 victory over his former club Udinese on 3 October 2009. On 24 October, Muntari scored his first goal of the season to help Inter Milan to a 2–1 victory over Catania.

On 16 April 2010, in their match against Juventus, he came on in the 89th minute for Wesley Sneijder, and three minutes later he assisted Samuel Eto'o to score Inter Milan's second goal, securing a 2–0 victory. The following match day, Muntari played the full 90 minutes and scored his second goal of the season after a shot from Moussa Marega deflected off him, to help Inter Milan to a 3–1 win over Atalanta. At the end of the season, Inter Milan retained the Serie A title with Muntari playing a key role, playing 27 out of 38 matches, scoring 2 goals and providing two assists. He played in all of Inter Milan's Coppa Italia matches that season, as the club won the competition for the sixth time in its history. He came on as a late substitute in the final, which Inter Milan won 1–0 over AS Roma. During Inter Milan's first Champions League match of the season, Muntari started and played 62 minutes before taken off for Dejan Stanković in their goalless draw against Barcelona. Further on, in total, he played 9 matches out of 12 in their European berth as Inter Milan secured their third Champions League title after 45 years, since their second title in 1965. The title secured Inter Milan the first ever Italian treble (Serie A, the Coppa Italia, and the UEFA Champions League). In the final, Muntari came on as a second-half substitute, after Diego Milito had secured the title with two goals against Bayern Munich at the Santiago Bernabeu. He became the fourth Ghanaian to win the Champions League. Across all competitions that season, Muntari made 42 appearances and played a significant role in securing the treble.

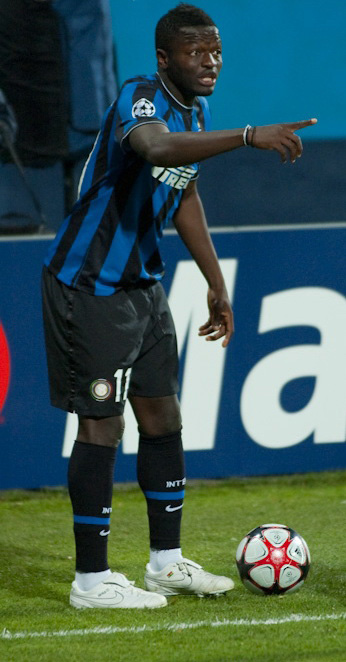
Muntari playing for Inter in 2010

==== 2010–11 season ====
After José Mourinho's departure, in the 2010–11 season, Muntari fell down the pecking order and was considered a fringe player by new manager Rafael Benitez. He came on as a substitute in four of their first five games of the season. There were multiple reports most notably from Sky Sports that Muntari wanted to leave for another team where he would be a first-team regular after missing out on the match-day squad for their match against Juventus on 5 October. He refused to sit in the stands to watch the game and instead went home after learning he had not been selected for the match-day squad. In a counter-interview, Benitez stated that he would meet with him to discuss the matter. The following match-day, Muntari came on as a late substitute for Wesley Sneijder, to play the final four minutes of their 1–0 victory over Cagliari Calcio. On 29 October, he came on in the 19th minute for injured Esteban Cambiasso to score 25-yard long range goal to secure a 1–0 away win against Genoa. Muntari won the 2010 FIFA Club World Cup with Inter after they defeated TP Mazembe 3–0 in the final. He was an unused substitute in the final however, he played 13 minutes of the 3–0 semi-final victory over Seongnam FC.

On 15 January 2011, Inter Technical Director Marco Branca confirmed Muntari had handed in an official transfer request. A number of Premier League clubs were speculated to be interested in Muntari.

==== Loan to Sunderland ====
On 26 January 2011, Premier League club Sunderland were given permission to hold talks with Muntari, and on 29 January, he signed for Sunderland on loan from Inter until the end of the 2010–11 season. On 7 May 2011, he was initially credited with his first and only goal in a 2–1 win over Bolton Wanderers, but this was subsequently recorded as a Zat Knight own goal.

On 13 May 2011, Sunderland opted not to sign Muntari on a permanent basis, and he returned to Inter. He played the first half of the 2011–12 season for Inter Milan and played four league matches before going on loan to AC Milan.

=== AC Milan ===
==== 2011–12 season ====
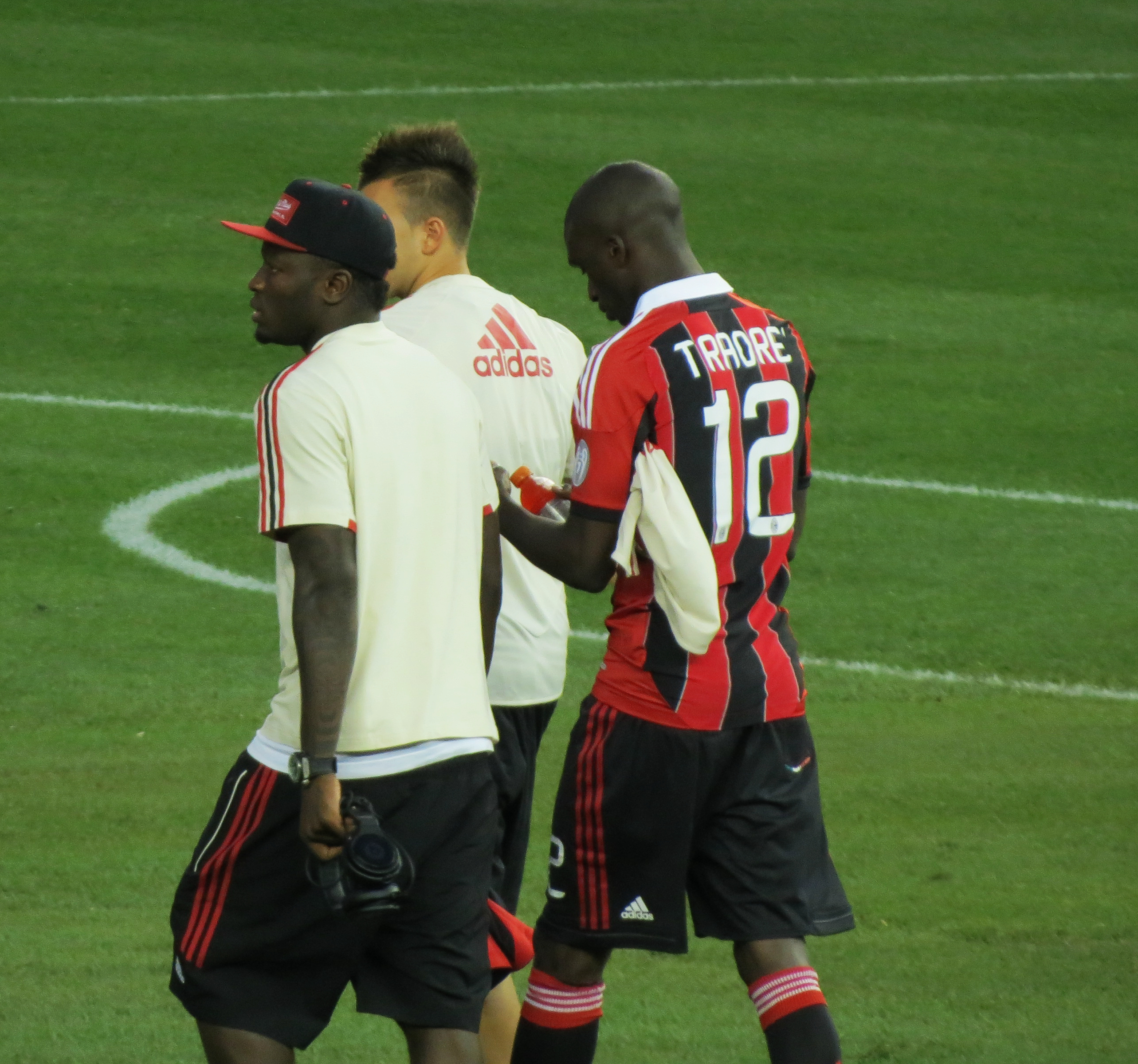
Muntari (left) with AC Milan teammates El Shaarawy (center) and Traoré (far right) in 2012

On 31 January 2012, Muntari joined AC Milan on loan. On 19 February 2012, Muntari scored his first goal as a Milan player on his debut, in a Serie A away match against Cesena, which Milan won 3–1. On 25 February 2012, with Milan leading 1–0 against Juventus, Muntari appeared to have doubled Milan's lead with a header from a cross by Urby Emanuelson, however the goal was not given by referee Paolo Tagliavento despite the ball crossing the line while being saved by Gianluigi Buffon; the match ended 1–1. On 2 May 2012, Muntari scored a goal against Atalanta in a game that ended 2–0, bringing Milan one point behind leaders Juventus. Juventus eventually went on to win the Serie A title that year, beating Milan to the Scudetto by four points.

Massimiliano Allegri said to Milan Channel in May 2012 that Muntari would play with Milan for a further two years until June 2014. Muntari officially signed for Milan on a free transfer after his Inter contract expired on 1 July 2012.

==== 2012–13 season ====
While on holiday in the off-season, Muntari picked up a knee injury playing beach football that could keep him out for the entire first half of the 2012–13 season. On 20 February 2013, Muntari scored a goal to give Milan a two-goal lead against Barcelona ahead of the second leg in the last 16 tie in the UEFA Champions League. However, it was not enough as Barcelona knocked Milan out in the return leg at the Camp Nou, 4–0 and 4–2 on aggregate.

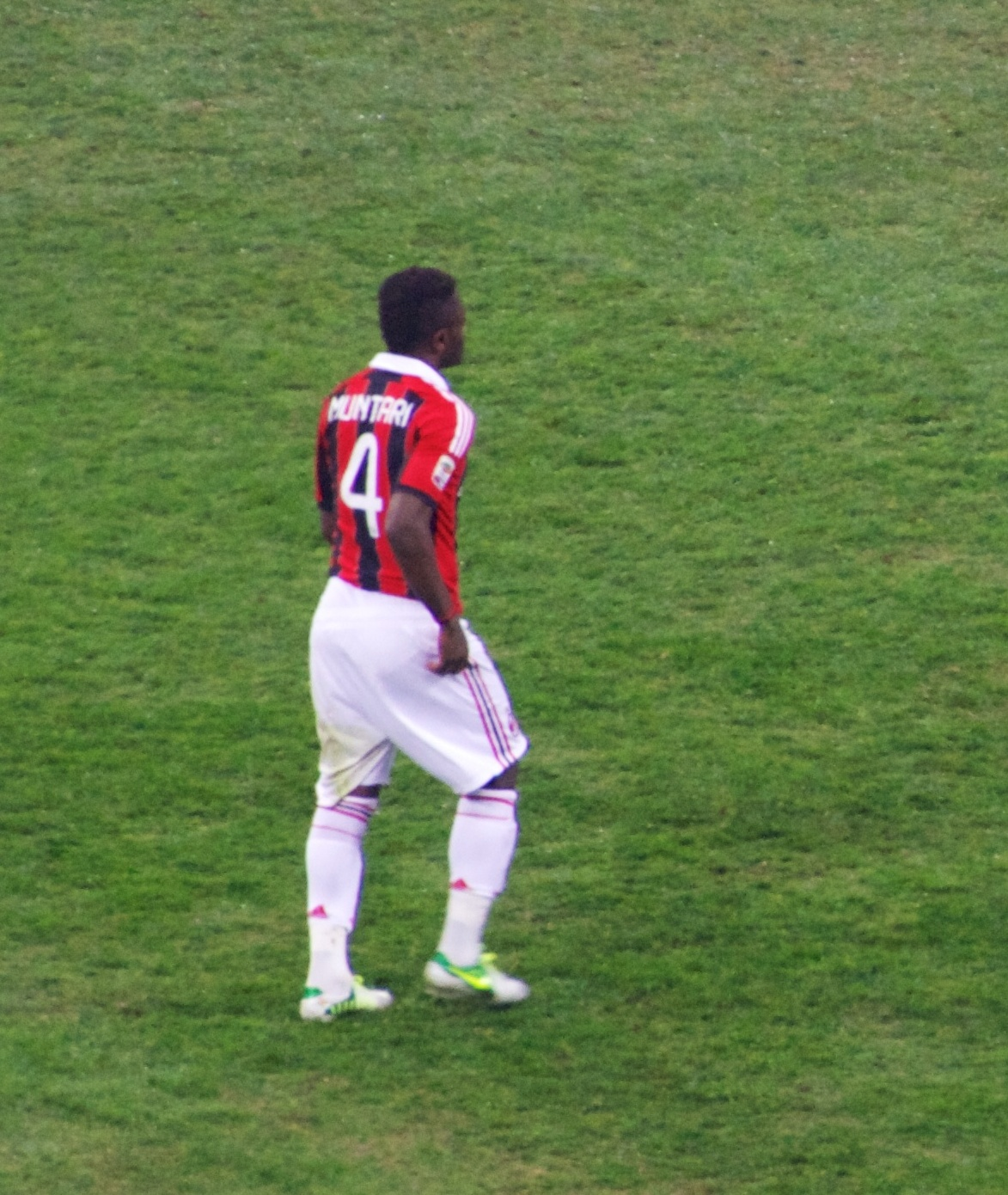
Muntari playing for AC Milan in 2013

On 8 May 2013, Muntari scored his first goal in 2012–13 season in a match against Pescara, which Milan won 4–0. Later that month, he was fined €10,000 and suspended for two matches after being sent off during a game against Roma for manhandling referee Gianluca Rocchi whilst protesting a call.

==== 2013–14 season ====
On 6 October, Muntari put on an impressive performance for Milan as he scored two goals against Juventus, though Juventus went on to win the game 3–2. On 16 December Muntari scored a late goal against Roma to salvage a 2–2 draw. He was then sent off the following match against former club Inter when he hit Zdravko Kuzmanović, receiving a three-match ban. On 18 May, Muntari helped Milan win the three points against Sassuolo when Muntari scored a goal and helped Milan win the match 2–1.

==== 2014–15 season ====
On 18 June 2014, Muntari signed a new two-year contract with Milan. On 31 August 2014, Muntari scored in Milan's opening game in the 2014–15 Serie A as Milan beat Lazio 3–1. On 4 October, Muntari contributed to Milan's 2–0 win against Chievo by scoring the opening goal of the game. He was released by mutual consent on 30 June 2015.

=== Ittihad FC ===
On 27 July 2015, Muntari joined Saudi league team Ittihad FC on a two-year deal. He made his league debut for the Jeddah-based club on 20 August, in their first match of the season, playing the full 90 minutes as they defeated Najran SC 2–1. On 17 October, Muntari provided two assists to two of the three goals scored by Gelmin Rivas in a 3–1 victory over Al-Qadsiah. On 25 February 2016, he scored his first goal for the club, helping his side to a 1–0 home league victory against Najran SC. He scored his second goal for the club the following game week in their 6–2 victory over Al-Raed.

Muntari played in the 2016 AFC Champions League, he made his debut in the competition against Lokomotiv Tashkent in their 1–1 draw on 23 February. The following month, in their second leg against Lokomotiv Tashkent, he scored his third goal for the club, a long range effort which helped Ittihad to another 1–1 draw. At the end of the season, Muntari played 29 matches in all competitions and scored three goals. Muntari's contract with Ittihad was terminated at the end of the season due to financial constraints from the club. In 2017, FIFA ordered the team to pay him $5.3 million due protracted contract dispute.

=== Pescara ===
In January 2017 he returned to Italy by signing a six-month contract with Pescara. Muntari made his debut 5 February 2017, in a 6–2 loss to Lazio. On 12 March, he scored his first goal for Pescara in their 3–2 loss to his former club Udinese Calcio. On 30 April 2017, Muntari left a Serie A match at Cagliari after his complaints of racist abuse were met with a yellow card. After that incident, Muntari did not feature for the club again and was benched for the remaining four matches of the season. That match against Cagliari extended Muntari's Serie A appearance record for an African Player to 270 matches. The record was later broken by fellow Ghanaian player Kwadwo Asamoah in 2021.

=== Deportivo La Coruña ===
On 22 February 2018, Muntari joined Spanish club Deportivo de La Coruña until the end of the 2017–18 season. The manager, Clarence Seedorf, with whom he played in the 2011–12 season at AC Milan, influenced him to sign with the club. He was given the number 21 jersey which was previously won by the club's legend Juan Carlos Valerón. A day after his announcement, he made his debut for the club, coming on in the 82nd minute for Pedro Mosquera in their goalless draw against Espanyol.

=== Albacete ===
On 31 January 2019, after six months of inactivity Muntari signed with Albacete until the end of the season. Due to his lack of fitness, Muntari did not make a mach day squad for Albacete until 2 March 2019, when he was named on the bench and was unused substitute in their 1–0 loss to Cádiz CF. The following match day, he came on in the 84th minute for Mickaël Malsa to make his debut in their 1–0 loss to Gimnàstic. On 7 April 2019, he started his match for the club, assisting Aleix Febas to score the game-winning goal against AD Alcorcón to grant them a 1–0 away win.

=== Accra Hearts of Oak ===
After two-years without a contract, Muntari returned to active football and joined Ghana Premier League giants Hearts of Oak on a six-month deal. He revealed that he signed with the Accra-based team because his son asked him to do so, so that he could come to the stadium and watch him play. Muntari was given the number 10 jersey after Hearts petitioned the Ghana Football Association after Emmanuel Nettey has worn that jersey number in the first half of the season, prior to his transfer. On 6 February 2022, he made his debut as a substitute in a 1–0 loss to rivals Accra Great Olympics, coming on in the 79th minute for William Dankyi. The following match day, he made his first start for the club in their goalless draw against Real Tamale United at the Aliu Mahama Stadium. When Muntari was taken off in the 80th minute, he was given a standing ovation and received applause from both RTU and Hearts supporters.

He won the President Cup on 4 March, his first trophy at the club, playing 80 minutes of a 2–1 victory over arch-rivals Asante Kotoko. His performance earned him praise. On 9 March 2022, he scored his first goal, a winner in a 2–1 Ghana Premier League match against West African Football Academy. He scored from the penalty spot after Patrick Razak was fouled in the box.

On 27 June 2022, Muntari came on as a late substitute in the 2023 Ghana FA Cup final as Hearts won the cup via a 2–1 victory over Bechem United.

The FA Cup final was also his final professional career match, after turning down a contract renewal proposal from the club and announcing his retirement in November. At the end of his short-stint with Hearts, he made 15 matches in all competitions, scored 1 goal, provided two assists and won two trophies.

On 28 November 2022, Muntari announced his retirement in an interview with Sky Sports stating that – “I just did a few months with the local side-Hearts of Oak. My son wanted me to play. I didn’t play for almost three years, then my son decided to ask me to go and play. I did that but now I’m done”, bringing an end to his 18 years professional career.

== International career ==
=== Youth ===
Muntari represented Black Starlets at the 2001 Meridian Cup, including a 1–1 draw with Portugal and losing to Italy 0–1. Muntari then was chosen for the 2001 FIFA World Youth Championship as Ghana took second place.

=== Senior ===
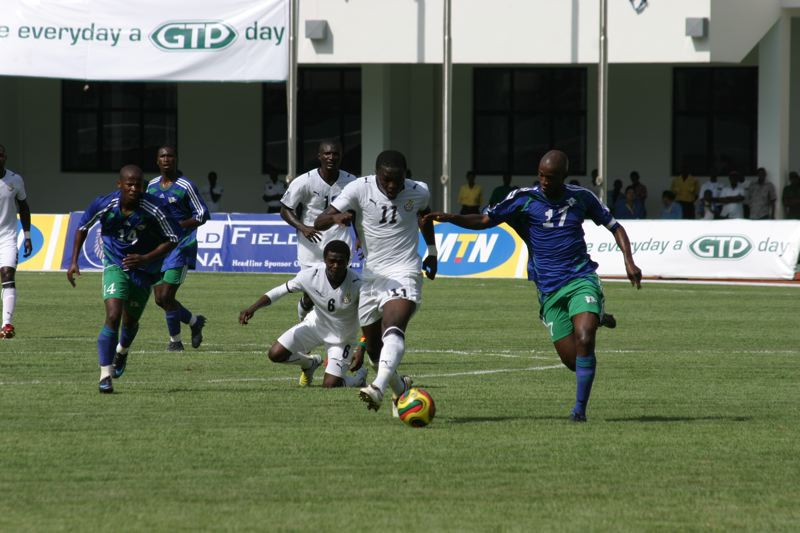
Muntari (centre) playing for Ghana against Lesotho in 2008

He won his first senior cap against Slovenia on 17 May 2002, and became a regular fixture in the team as The Black Stars opened their 2006 FIFA World Cup qualifying campaign. He was selected for the Olympic side at Athens 2004, but was sent home for disciplinary reasons. This started a dispute between Muntari and the Ghana Football Association (GFA), and he said that he would refuse to play for his country again, setting the "record" for the youngest international retirement. He retracted, making a public apology to the Association, and was selected for the 2006 World Cup squad. He played in the first two matches, a 2–0 defeat by Italy and a 2–0 win over the Czech Republic, in which he scored, but having received a yellow cards in each game. He was suspended for the game against the United States, but returned for the second round match against Brazil, in which Ghana was eliminated.

He remained a regular member of the team, and appeared in the 2008 African Cup of Nations side, scoring the winner in the first group match against Guinea and the second goal in the last group match against Morocco. He scored his third goal of the tournament when he scored a free-kick against Ivory Coast in the third-place play-off. His goal against Guinea, a 25-metre left-footed pile-driver in the 89th minute, was voted one of the Best Goals of the Tournament.

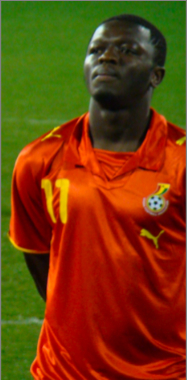
Muntari with Ghana in 2008

He was voted as an All-Star Player during the 2008 African Cup of Nations Tournament in Ghana. The Team of the Tournament was decided by the Technical Study Group (TSG) after careful observations of all the tournament's matches.

Although expected to play for Ghana in the 2010 African Cup of Nations in Angola, Muntari was excluded from the national team due to disciplinary problems. After purposefully missing an international friendly against Angola, he also snubbed a meeting with coach Milovan Rajevac. Muntari later issued a full apology to his country and coach.

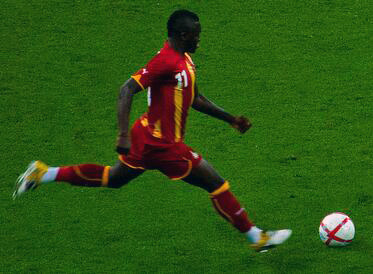
Muntari in action for Ghana in 2011

Muntari was selected for Ghana's 2010 World Cup squad. After not being included in the starting line-up for the team's first two matches, Muntari was reportedly expelled from the squad for insulting Rajevac and his teammates. However, after an intervention by former captain Stephen Appiah, he was reinstated and went on to make two further substitute appearances against Germany and the United States before starting the quarter-final against Uruguay in place of the suspended André Ayew. During the match, Muntari scored a long-range effort in first half stoppage time, putting Ghana ahead 1–0 at half-time.

On 2 June 2014, Muntari was named in Ghana's squad for the 2014 World Cup. In the team's opening match, he was in the starting line-up for the Black Stars against the United States in a 2–1 defeat.

Muntari and Kevin-Prince Boateng were sent home from the Black Stars camp in Brazil and suspended from the Ghana squad on 26 June 2014 for disciplinary reasons, only hours before the final Group match against Portugal. Muntari reportedly assaulted Moses Armah, a member of former manager James Kwesi Appiah's coaching staff.

== Style of play ==
A former left-back, Muntari later developed into a powerful, experienced, hard-working, and tenacious midfielder; although he is primarily known for his physical strength and combative playing style, he was also able to make notable improvements to his technical skills throughout his career. He also possesses a good left-foot, a powerful shot from outside the area, and is a solid passer of the ball. He primarily excels as a ball-winner, due to his energy, tactical intelligence, and ability to break down the opposition's play; a versatile footballer, although he is usually deployed as a defensive, central, or box-to-box midfielder, he is also capable of playing as a left winger or even as an attacking midfielder. Due to his aggressive and hard-tackling style of play, however, he has also been criticised for his tendency to pick up cards.

== Personal life ==
His younger brother is Sulley Muniru, who plays in the Russian Liga I.

In December 2010, Muntari married Ghanaian businesswoman Menaye Donkor and they have a son. On 20 June 2015, it was reported that Donkor had given birth to the couple's first child. On 16 September 2020, Donkor confirmed the arrival of their second child, in an interview on GhOne TV.

Muntari is a devout Muslim.

== Career statistics ==
=== Club ===
Club	Season	League			National cup (Note: Includes Copa Italia, FA Cup, King Cup, Ghana FA Cup)		Continental		Other		Total	
Club	Season	Division	Apps	Goals	Apps	Goals	Apps	Goals	Apps	Goals	Apps	Goals
Udinese	2002–03	Serie A	12	0	2	0	—		—		14	0
Udinese	2003–04	Serie A	23	0	4	0	1 (Note: Appearance(s) in UEFA Champions League)	0	—		28	0
Udinese	2004–05	Serie A	33	2	6	0	2 (Note: Appearances in UEFA Cup)	0	—		41	2
Udinese	2005–06	Serie A	29	3	0	0	11 (Note: Eight appearances in UEFA Champions League, three appearances in UEFA Cup)	0	—		40	3
Udinese	2006–07	Serie A	28	3	2	1	—		—		30	4
Udinese	Total		125	8	14	1	14	0	—		153	9
Portsmouth	2007–08	Premier League	29	4	4	1	—		—		33	5
Inter Milan	2008–09	Serie A	27	4	3	0	7	1	1 (Note: Appearances in Italian Supercup)	1	38	5
Inter Milan	2009–10	Serie A	27	2	5	0	9	0	1	0	42	2
Inter Milan	2010–11	Serie A	8	1	1	0	3	0	1 (Note: Appearance in FIFA Club World Cup)	0	13	1
Inter Milan	2011–12	Serie A	4	0	0	0	0	0	—		4	0
Inter Milan	Total		66	7	9	0	19	0	3	1	97	8
Sunderland (loan)	2010–11	Premier League	9	1	0	0	—		—		9	1
Milan (loan)	2011–12	Serie A	13	3	1	0	0	0	—		14	3
Milan	2012–13	Serie A	15	1	1	0	2	1	—		18	2
Milan	2013–14	Serie A	26	5	0	0	8	1	—		34	6
Milan	2014–15	Serie A	16	2	1	0	—		—		17	2
Milan	Total		70	11	3	0	10	2	—		83	13
Al-Ittihad	2015–16	Saudi Pro League	18	2	3	0	5 (Note: Appearances in AFC Champions League)	1	3	0	29	3
Pescara	2016–17	Serie A	9	1	0	0	—		—		9	1
Deportivo La Coruña	2017–18	La Liga	8	0	0	0	—		—		8	0
Albacete	2018–19	Segunda División	2	0	0	0	—		—		2	0
Hearts of Oak	2021–22	Ghana Premier League	11	1	3	0	0	0	1 (Note: Appearance in President's Cup)	0	15	1
Career total			347	35	36	2	48	3	7	1	438	41

=== International ===
Appearances and goals by national team and year
National team	Year	Apps	Goals
Ghana	2002	2	2
Ghana	2003	1	0
Ghana	2004	5	1
Ghana	2005	6	2
Ghana	2006	11	3
Ghana	2007	8	2
Ghana	2008	12	4
Ghana	2009	6	2
Ghana	2010	6	2
Ghana	2011	10	1
Ghana	2012	8	1
Ghana	2013	5	2
Ghana	2014	4	0
Total		84	20

Scores and results list the Ghana's goal tally first, score column indicates score after each Muntari goal.

List of international goals scored by Sulley Muntari
No.	Date	Venue	Opponent	Score	Result	Competition	Ref.
1	2 June 2004	Baba Yara Stadium, Kumasi, Ghana	South Africa	1–0	3–0	2006 FIFA World Cup qualification	
2	8 October 2005	Estádio da Várzea, Praia, Cape Verde	Cape Verde	2–0	4–0	2006 FIFA World Cup qualification	
3	14 November 2005	Prince Abdullah Al-Faisal Sports City, Jeddah, Saudi Arabia	Saudi Arabia	1–1	3–1	Friendly	
4	29 May 2006	Walkers Stadium, Leicester, England	Jamaica	1–0	4–1	Friendly	
5	4 June 2006	Easter Road, Edinburgh, Scotland	South Korea	2–1	3–1	Friendly	
6	17 June 2006	RheinEnergieStadion, Cologne, Germany	Czech Republic	2–0	2–0	2006 FIFA World Cup	
7	6 February 2007	Griffin Park, Brentford, England	Nigeria	2–0	4–1	Friendly	
8	24 March 2007	Ernst-Happel-Stadion, Vienna, Austria	Austria	1–1	1–1	Friendly	
9	20 January 2008	Accra Sports Stadium, Accra, Ghana	Guinea	2–1	2–1	2008 Africa Cup of Nations	
10	28 January 2008	Accra Sports Stadium, Accra, Ghana	Morocco	2–0	2–0	2008 Africa Cup of Nations	
11	9 February 2008	Baba Yara Stadium, Kumasi, Ghana	Ivory Coast	1–0	4–2	Friendly	
12	22 June 2008	Accra Sports Stadium, Accra, Ghana	Gabon	2–0	2–0	2010 FIFA World Cup qualification	
13	12 August 2009	Brisbane Road, London, England	Zambia	1–0	4–1	Friendly	
14	6 September 2009	Accra Sports Stadium, Accra, Ghana	Sudan	1–0	2–0	2010 FIFA World Cup qualification	
15	3 March 2010	Koševo City Stadium, Sarajevo, Bosnia and Herzegovina	Bosnia and Herzegovina	1–0	1–2	Friendly	
16	2 July 2010	FNB Stadium, Johannesburg, South Africa	Uruguay	1–0	1–1	2010 FIFA World Cup	
17	27 March 2011	Stade Alphonse Massemba-Débat, Brazzaville, Republic of the Congo	Congo	3–0	3–0	2012 Africa Cup of Nations qualification	
18	1 June 2012	Baba Yara Stadium, Kumasi, Ghana	Lesotho	1–0	7–0	2014 FIFA World Cup qualification	
19	7 June 2013	Al-Merrikh Stadium, Omdurman, Sudan	Sudan	3–1	3–1	2014 FIFA World Cup qualification	
20	15 October 2013	Baba Yara Stadium, Kumasi, Ghana	Egypt	5–1	6–1	2014 FIFA World Cup qualification	

== Honours ==
Portsmouth

- FA Cup: 2007–08

Inter Milan

- Serie A: 2008–09, 2009–10
- Coppa Italia: 2009–10
- Supercoppa Italiana: 2008, 2010
- UEFA Champions League: 2009–10
- FIFA Club World Cup: 2010

Hearts of Oak

- Ghanaian FA Cup: 2021–22
- President's Cup: 2022

Ghana U20

- African Youth Championship runner-up: 2001
- FIFA U-20 World Cup runner-up: 2001

Ghana

- Africa Cup of Nations third place: 2008

Individual

- CAF Team of the Year: 2008
- Africa Cup of Nations Team of the Tournament: 2008
- Calcio Trade Ball Lifetime Achievement Award: 2022
