= Marek Jankulovski =

Czech footballer (born 1977)

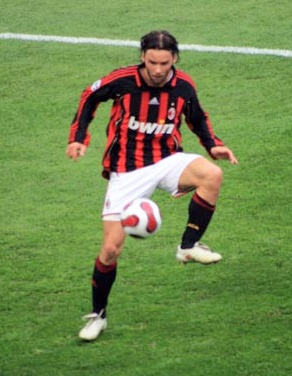
- Jankulovski playing for AC Milan in 2007

Personal information
- Full name: Marek Jankulovski
- Date of birth: 9 May 1977 (age 49)
- Place of birth: Ostrava, Czechoslovakia
- Height: 1.83 m (6 ft 0 in)
- Positions: Left back; left winger

Youth career
- 1987–1994: Baník Ostrava

Senior career*
Years	Team	Apps	(Gls)
1994–2000	Baník Ostrava	110	(15)
2000–2002	Napoli	51	(8)
2002–2005	Udinese	91	(15)
2005–2011	AC Milan	113	(4)
2011–2012	Baník Ostrava	1	(0)
Total		366	(42)

International career
2000–2009	Czech Republic	78	(12)
- * Club domestic league appearances and goals

Marek Jankulovski (born 9 May 1977) is a Czech former professional footballer who played as a defender. His most notable achievements include winning the UEFA Champions League with AC Milan and being voted the 2007 Czech Footballer of the Year. He earned 77 caps for the Czech Republic, and represented them at three UEFA European Championships, the 2000 Summer Olympics and the 2006 FIFA World Cup.

Jankulovski was well known for his versatility, being able to play anywhere on the left side, and was used as a full-back, as a wing-back, and as a winger throughout his career. He was also known for his ability to cross the ball, as well as his considerable technical ability and energetic attacking runs down the left flank.

== Club career ==
=== Baník Ostrava ===
Jankulovski started his career for Baník Ostrava after joining from NH Ostrava. In 1994, he made a breakthrough into the first team, as the club finished in third place in the league. Jankulovski started out, playing in the attacking midfield position before playing in the defender position and established himself in the first team.

Jankulovski scored in the opening game of the 1999–2000 season in a 6–1 win against Chmel Blšany. A week later he opened the scoring in a 2–2 home draw against Sigma Olomouc. It was not until 27 February 2000 when Jankulovski scored his third goal of the season, in a 4–1 win against Sigma Olomouc. This was followed by scoring twice in a 3–1 victory against Drnovice. He then went on to score three goals later in the 1999–2000 season. By the end of the 1999–2000 season, Jankulovski had made 27 appearances and scored eight times in all competitions; his performance at Baník Ostrava attracted interest from foreign clubs. By the time he left the club, Jankulovski had made a total of 110 league appearances, scoring fifteen goals.

=== Napoli ===
Following his participation in the UEFA Euro 2000, Napoli began negotiations to sign Jankulovski. The transfer was confirmed on 29 June 2000. He was one of a large number of players brought in by new Czech manager Zdeněk Zeman. Jankulovski said about his compatriot manager, Zeman: "I had heard of Zeman's methods in my country. I had prepared myself to suffer. Yet I am still in pieces, after having faced many kilometers of running in a few days. It is a different preparation from what I was used to."

Jankulovski made his debut for Napoli, playing the whole game, in a 1–1 draw against Lecce on 1 November 2000. He scored his first goal for the club in a 2–1 loss against Vicenza four days later. After the match, La Repubblica praised his performance. After joining Napoli, however, Jankulovski found his playing time, mostly coming from the substitute bench. He scored his second goal for the club in a 6–2 victory against Reggina on 16 December 2000, having come on as a substitute in the 75th minute. In a goalless draw against Perugia on 18 March 2001, Jankulovski played as a substitute but received a straight red card for protesting in the 90th minute. On 14 April 2001, after serving a one match suspension, he scored on his comeback as a substitute in the 87th minute against Bari. Napoli finished the season being relegated to Serie B. At the end of the 2000–01 season, Jankulovski had made twenty appearances and scored once in all competitions.

Ahead of the 2001–02 Serie A, Jankulovski remained at Napoli despite the club's relegation. He scored his first goal of the season in a 2–1 loss against Siena on 12 August 2001. After the start of said season Jankulovski continued to regain his first-team place, rotating in playing either left midfield and central midfield.

Early in the 2001–02 season he was linked with a move to Premier League side West Ham United, as well as Italian sides Lecce, Fiorentina and Torino.

By December, he began playing at left-back. Later, Jankulovski scored two goals in the next two matches against Cosenza and Pistoiese between 9 December 2001 and 14 December 2001. After missing two missing two matches due to injury, he made a comeback by scoring in a 1–1 draw against Cagliari on 24 February 2002. Jankulovski then scored in a 1–1 draw against Palermo, and in a 2–1 loss against Siena. Despite suffering injuries throughout the season, he made 33 appearances in all competitions, scoring six times.

=== Udinese ===
In February 2002, Jankulovski signed a four-year contract with Serie A side Udinese, staying with Napoli on loan for the rest of the 2001–02 season. In the opening game of the 2002–03 season, Jankulovski made his debut for the club, coming on as a 57th-minute substitute during a 1–1 draw against Parma. After joining Udinese, he quickly became a first-team regular, rotating in playing either at left-back or in midfield for the next five matches. After missing five matches that saw him sidelined for one month, Jankulovski returned to the first team, coming on as a 66th-minute substitute in a 2–1 victory against Empoli on 8 December 2002.

Jankulovski helped Udinese keep three consecutive clean sheets between 18 December 2002 and 12 January 2003. Despite being sidelined towards the end of the 2002–03 season, he continued to regain his first-team place, rotating in playing either left-back or in midfield. He scored his first goal for the club in a 3–2 loss against Parma on 2 February 2003. This was followed by scoring his second goal of the season in a 2–1 victory against Piacenza. Jankulovski scored his third goal of the season, in a 3–2 win against Como on 19 April 2003. Once again, Jankulovski scored two goals in the remaining two matches of the 2002–03 season against Perugia and Lazio.

Ahead of the 2003–04 season, Jankulovski's performances attracted interest from Serie A clubs, but ended up staying at Udinese. The start of the season saw Jankulovski continue to regain his first-team place, rotating in playing either left-back or in midfield in the first 12 matches of the season. He played in both legs of the UEFA Cup's first round against Austria Salzburg, as the club lost 3–2 on aggregate. On 9 November 2003, Jankulovski scored his first goal of the season in a 4–1 loss against Juventus. One month later, he scored in both legs of the Coppa Italia last 16 against Bologna, as Udinese won 4–0 on aggregate. Jankulovski's fourth goal of the season came on 25 January 2004, in a 1–1 draw against Roma. He added two more goals in February against Bologna and Ancona. Jankulovski added two more goals in May and saw the club qualify for UEFA Cup next season. Despite missing two matches during the 2003–04 season, he made 38 appearances, scoring eight times in all competitions.

In summer 2004, Jankulovski was linked with a move to Juventus and CSKA Moscow. Eventually, he ended up staying at Udinese, having rejected a move to CSKA Moscow, preferring to remain in Italy. Having missed the opening match of the season due to an injury, Jankulovski made his first start in a 3–1 loss against Panionios in the first leg of the UEFA Cup first round on 16 September 2004. Three days later, on 19 September 2004, he scored his first goal of the season in a 4–0 loss against Parma. However, on 26 September 2004, Jankulovski received a straight red card for not having a sportsman-like behavior in the 80th minute in a 2–1 loss against Brescia. Four days later, on 30 September, in the return leg against Panionios in the UEFA Cup first round, he received another red card for unsportsmanlike attitude, as the club won 1–0 – but was eliminated from the tournament following a 3–2 loss on aggregate. After serving a one-match suspension, Jankulovski returned to the starting line-up on 17 October in a 3–1 loss against Inter Milan. Three days later on 20 October 2004, he signed a contract with the club, keeping him until June 2008. Following his return from suspension, Jankulovski regained his first-team place, playing at both right midfield and left midfield. On 7 November 2004, he scored twice, with an equaliser and converting the penalty to score the winning goal of the game in a 4–3 victory against Lecce. On 16 January 2005, Jankulovski scored an own goal in a 3–1 loss against AC Milan]. On 2 February, he made amends from mistakes by scoring his fourth goal of the season in a 3–0 victory against ChievoVerona. After serving a one-match suspension, Jankulovski returned to the starting line-up against Milan in the second leg of the Coppa Italia quarter-final, and set up one of the goals in a 4–1 victory, resulting in Udinese progressing to the semi-final with a 6–4 win on aggregate. Afterwards, he regained his first team place, starting in the next seven matches for the club. This lasted until when Jankulovski suffered an ankle injury that saw him sidelined for the rest of the 2004–05 season.

=== AC Milan ===
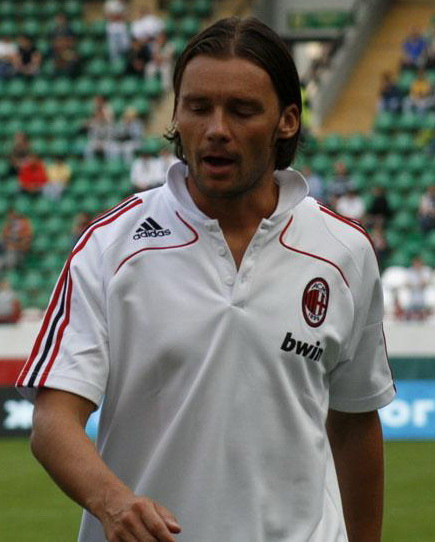
Jankulovski with AC Milan in 2007

In June 2005, Jankulovski was unveiled as an AC Milan player after signing a three-year contract for a fee of around 11 million Euros from Udinese. Milan had been keen on signing him since December 2004.

Due to the broken ankle he sustained in May, Jankulovski spent time in Milan with the club's physiotherapist while his new club had a pre–season tour in the United States. Jankulovski subsequently made his Milan debut as a late substitute in a 1–1 draw against Ascoli in the opening game of the 2005–06 season. Once again, he suffered another injury that saw him out for a month. Jankulovski returned to the first team from injury, coming on as a 78th-minute substitute, in a 2–0 win against Cagliari on 16 October 2005. This was followed up by making his first start for the club and setting up a winning goal for Filippo Inzaghi, in a 2–1 win against Palermo. He made his UEFA Champions League debut, coming on as a second-half substitute, in a 1–0 win against PSV Eindhoven on 1 November 2005. Following his return from injury, Jankulovski found himself in and out of the starting line-up, due to competitions he faced. He scored his first goal for Milan, in a 3–1 win against Messina on 22 April 2006. This was followed up by setting up another goal for Inzaghi, in a 2–0 win against Livorno. By the end of the 2005–06 season, Jankulovski had made 28 appearances and scored once across all competitions.

Ahead of the 2006–07 season, Jankulovski's future at Milan was in doubt, due to his lack of first team opportunities. But he made it clear to stay at the club. Jankulovski started the season well when he helped the club keep six consecutive clean sheets between 13 September 2006 and 1 October 2006. During which, Jankulovski scored his first goal of the season, scoring the only goal of the game, in a 1–0 win against Ascoli on 20 September 2006. He then scored his second goal of the season, once again, scoring the only goal of the game, in a 1–0 win against Chievo on 25 October 2006. Since the start of the 2006–07 season, Jankulovski quickly established himself at left-back. Upon the arrival of with Massimo Oddo, he became one of Milan's best players, and together, they were relied upon when the club lacked traditional wingers among the attacking players. On 11 February 2007, Jankulovski scored from 25 yards, which turns out to be a winning goal, in a 2–1 win against Livorno. Shortly after, he signed a new contract with Milan, keeping him until 2011. Jankulovski helped the club keep three consecutive clean sheets between 28 April 2007 and 6 May 2007, including a 3–0 win against Manchester United in the second leg of the UEFA Champions League that sent the club into the final. On 23 May 2007, he took part, starting at left-back and contributed to Milan's 2–1 victory in the final of the UEFA Champions League against Liverpool. After the match, Jankulovski said: "I can't even describe how I feel. It's beautiful. You could say it was random, but then we believed we could do it. It helped us, we were ahead of the half and we knew Liverpool had to open the game. This was confirmed and we finally added a second goal. Especially in the first half, they were better. I wasn't in the team at the time, but the memories are still alive. Fortunately, we've done it now." La Repubblica commentened on his performance, saying: "The crooked things of a Milan that travel under the track are all his. Benítez, on the left wing, organized an uncomfortable saucer for him, Pennant going, Mascherano introducing himself and looking for contrast." Despite being sidelined on five occasions throughout the 2006–07 season, Jankulovski made fifty appearances and scoring three times in all competitions.

At the start of the 2007–08 season, Jankulovski started at left-back against Sevilla in the 2007 UEFA Super Cup held on 31 August 2007 and scored the second goal of Milan's victory with a volley following a pass from Andrea Pirlo. He then regained his first-team place, playing at left-back in the first two months to the season. Following a 1–0 loss against Empoli on 21 October 2007, Jankulovski suffered a knee injury and was expected to be out somewhere between two and six months. In early December, he made a recovery from injury and made his return to the first team against Urawa Red Diamonds in the semi-final of the FIFA Club World Cup and helped the club keep a clean sheet to win 1–0 to advance to the final. Despite appearing as an unused substitute, Milan went on to win the tournament after beating Boca Juniors 4–2 on 16 December 2007. However, his return was short-lived when Jankulovski suffered a knee injury that kept him out for two months. He made his return to the first team from injury against Siena on 10 February 2008 and started the whole game to help the club a clean sheet, in a 1–0 win. Following this, Jankulovski continued to be involved in the first team despite suffering further injuries later in the 2007–08 season. Across the 2007–08 season, he made nineteen appearances and scored once in all competitions. Following this, on 28 May 2008, Jankulovski was named the 2007's Czech Player of the Year, with Petr Čech coming in second place.

At the start of the 2008–09 season, Jankulovski regained his first-team place, playing at left-back. He scored his first goal of the season, in a 3–1 win against FC Zürich on 18 September 2008. Three days later on 21 September 2008, Jankulovski set up one of the goals, in a 4–1 win against Lazio. He then helped Milan keep four league consecutive clean sheets between 28 September 2008 and 26 October 2008. Jankulovski then helped the club keep three consecutive clean sheets between 22 March 2009 and 11 April 2009. Despite missing three matches in the 2008–09 season, he made 38 appearances in all competitions, scoring once. Following this, Jankulovski undergo a surgery on his ankle and recovered from his injury.

At the start of the 2009–10 season, Jankulovski became a first-team regular for Milan, starting at left-back in the team's first six matches of the season. However, he was dropped from the first team and was demoted to the substitute bench, as Luca Antonini took over the left-back position. However, Jankulovski suffered ankle injury that saw him out for the rest of the year. On 6 January 2010, he made his return to the first team, coming on as a 76th-minute substitute, in a 5–2 win against Genoa. Due to lack of first team opportunities, Milan were said to have offered Jankulovski to Inter in exchange for Mancini during the winter transfer period. However, he refused to move to the club's bitter rivals and later said that betraying Milan was not an option, stating, "Truth be told, I didn't give it much thought... I wanted to stay at Milan, I've been here for five years and I'm settled." Following this, he later made five starts later in the 2009–10 season. Despite facing further sidelined later in the 2009–10 season, Jankulovski managed sixteen appearances in all competitions.

Ahead of the 2010–11 season, Jankulovski said he wanted to stay at Milan despite expecting to be behind the pecking order. Jankulovski continued to remain on the sidelines for the first four months of the season due to injuries and Antonini remained as the club's first-choice left-back. He made his first appearance of the season, coming on as a late substitute, in a 3–1 win against Palermo on 10 November 2010. However, his return was short-lived when Jankulovski suffered another injury that kept him out for two months. It was not until 26 January 2011 when he made his first appearances in two months, coming on as an 80th-minute substitute in a 2–1 win against Sampdoria in the quarter-final of the Coppa Italia. Four days later on 30 January 2011, Jankulovski announced his intention to leave Milan at the end of the 2010–11 season and return to the Czech Republic to close out his career. Following the absence of Antonini, Jankulovski made three starts for the club, playing at left-back. In a match against Palermo on 17 March 2011, however, Jankulovski suffered a knee injury and was substituted in the 17th minute, as Milan lost 1–0. After the match, he had surgery on his left knee, causing him to miss the rest of the 2010–11 season. Despite this, Jankulovski was part of the Milan team that won the Serie A title that season. By the end of the 2010–11 season, he had made eight appearances in all competitions.

=== Return to Baník Ostrava ===
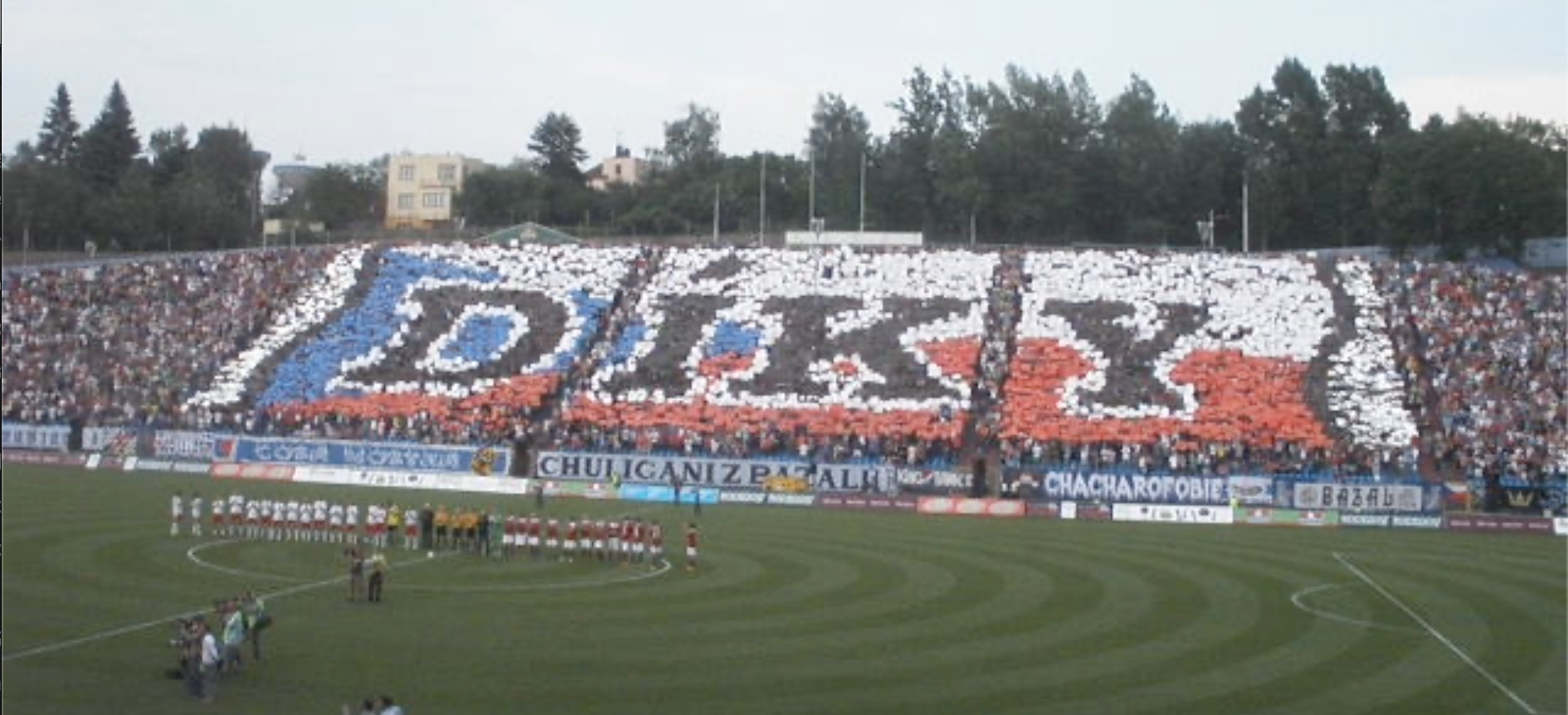
Jankulovski's farewell match in 2013

On 10 October 2011, Jankulovski returned to play club football in the Czech Republic for the first time since leaving Baník Ostrava for Italy 11 years before. He made his first appearance for Baník in eleven years against Hradec Králové on 15 October 2011 but managed to play just eight minutes after coming on as a substitute before suffering a knee injury and leaving the pitch, in what turned out to be his last professional football match. On 20 February 2012, he announced his retirement due to being unable to recover from his knee injury. In June 2013, Jankulovski was given a Testimonial match at Bazaly, in which he played for both sides.

== International career ==
=== Early international career ===
Jankulovski represented the Czech Republic youth national football teams ranging from U16 to U21. On 8 February 2000, Jankulovski made his senior team debut, playing the whole match in a 2–1 victory against Mexico.

In June 2000, Jankulovski was named in the squad for UEFA Euro 2000. He played in a 2–1 loss against France on 16 June 2000, coming on as a 62nd-minute substitute for Tomáš Rosický. Due to the loss, his nation were eliminated from the tournament. Four days later, Jankulovski made another substitute appearance, coming on in the 61st minute of a 2–0 victory against Denmark.

Jankulovski made his first senior international start in a 1–0 loss against Slovenia on 16 August 2000. One month later, he was called up to the Czech Republic Olympic squad in the 2000 Summer Olympics. Jankulovski scored in the tournament in a 2–2 draw against the United States on 13 September 2000. He played twice more in the tournament, as the Czech Republic were eliminated from the group stage. On 1 September 2001, Jankulovski scored his first international goal in a 3–1 loss against Iceland. This was followed up by scoring his second senior international goal in a 3–2 victory against Malta. He played in both legs of play–offs against Belgium, as the national side lost 2–0 on aggregate.

=== UEFA Euro 2004 ===
Following the failure to qualify for the 2002 FIFA World Cup, Jankulovski helped the Czech Republic keep three consecutive clean sheets between 27 March and 18 May 2002. He scored his third goal for the Czech Republic in a 2–0 victory against Moldova on 12 October 2002. On 2 April 2003, Jankulovski scored his fourth goal for the national side in a 4–0 victory against Austria. In June 2004, he was called up to the squad for UEFA Euro 2004. Jankulovski became the Czech Republic's first-choice left-back and helped the national team progress through the group stage and the quarter-final. However, he helped the Czech Republic finish third place in the tournament after losing 1–0 against Greece on 1 July 2004.

=== 2006 FIFA World Cup ===
After the UEFA Euro 2004, Jankulovski helped the national team keep four consecutive clean sheets between 9 October 2004 and 5 February 2005. One month later on 30 March 2005, he scored his seventh goal for the Czech Republic in a 4–0 victory against Andorra. Jankulovski then played against Norway in both legs of play–offs, as the national side won 2–0 to qualify for the FIFA World Cup. In May 2006, he was named in the Czech Republic squad for the 2006 FIFA World Cup. Jankulovski then helped the national team keep four consecutive clean sheets between 26 May and 12 June 2006, including scoring once against Saudi Arabia and then in the opening match of the group stage against the United States. Jankulovski became the Czech Republic's first-choice left-back in the next two matches, as the team was eliminated in the group stage.

=== UEFA Euro 2008 ===
Following the end of 2006 World Cup, Jankulovski continued to be the Czech Republic's first-choice left-back throughout UEFA Euro 2008 qualifying. In September 2007 he scored in a 3–0 away win against San Marino. He scored the only goal of the game the same month against the Republic of Ireland, picking up a second yellow card in the competition and causing him to miss the following competitive game, against Germany in October. The Czech Republic went on beat Germany in their next competitive fixture on 17 October 2007, qualifying for UEFA Euro 2008 in the process. On 14 May 2008, it was announced that Jakulovski would be included in the Czech Republic squad for UEFA Euro 2008. He was the team's first-choice left-back throughout the tournament and played all three matches, as the Czech Republic were eliminated in the group stage.

=== Late international career ===
Having previously hinted about international retirement after UEFA Euro 2008, Jakulovski had a change of heart on retirement. He was called up to the national team on 11 August 2008. Jankulovski scored a direct free kick for the Czech Republic in a 2–2 draw in a friendly against England seven days later on 18 August. He continued to be the team's first-choice left-back during the qualifying for the 2010 FIFA World Cup. Jankulovski scored for the Czech Republic in a 2–1 loss against Slovakia on 1 April 2009, with a shot which deflected off Slovak defender Martin Škrtel before going in the net. The national team failed to qualify for FIFA World Cup, finishing behind Slovakia and Slovenia in October 2009. Jankulovski announced his retirement from international football later the same month.

== Style of play ==
Although he usually played on the left side of midfield, Jankulovski also played in defence.

== Post-playing career ==
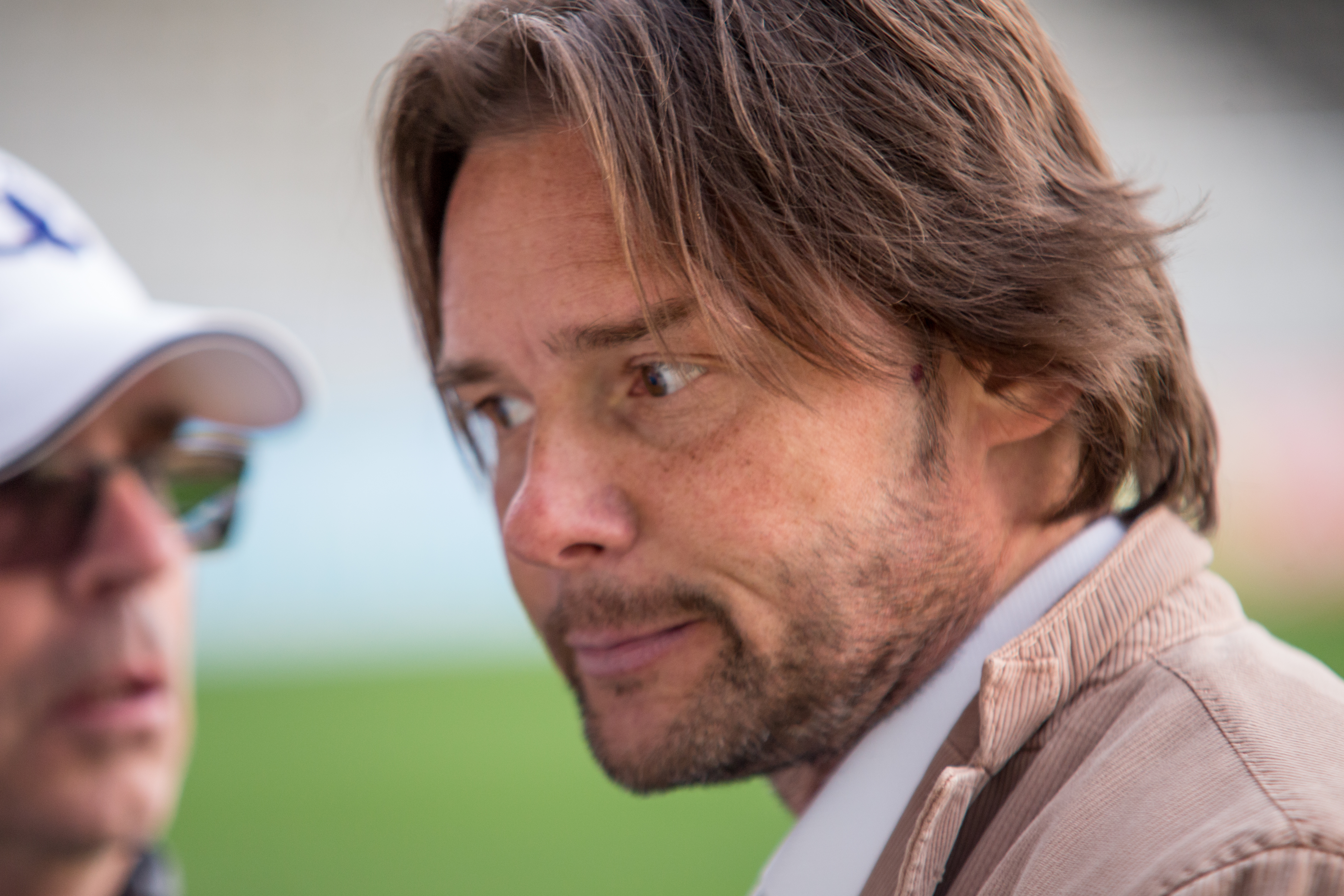
Jankulovski as Baník Ostrava's sporting director in 2019

Shortly after announcing his retirement from professional football, Baník Ostrava appointed Jankulovski as its consultant. He also worked as a pundit for the UEFA Champions League coverage on Czech channel Prima Cool.

Having expressed interest in working for Baník Ostrava, Jankulovski was appointed as the club's sporting director on 11 June 2018. After two seasons at Baník Ostrava, he left his role as the club's sporting director on 13 July 2020.

== Personal life ==
His father, Pando Jankulovski, is a Macedonian who emigrated to Czechoslovakia from Yugoslavia, while his mother, Ludmila, is Czech. Jankulovski used an interpreter for Italian after moving to the country and was criticised by Italian media for his ability in the language ten years later. He is married to Jana Jankulovska and they have two daughters, Karolína and Kristýna.

In May 2006, Jankulovski was accused of placing bets through an illegal bookmaker, along with three other players; which Betting was not illegal for Italian players until November 2005. The investigation lasted until June 2007 when he was cleared of all charges against him. In May 2009, Jankulovski was accused of placing bets through an illegal bookmaker, along with three other players once again. The investigation lasted until July 2010 when he was cleared of all charges facing him. In January 2016, Jankulovski was named as one of several players accused of tax evasion.

== Career statistics ==
=== Club ===
Club	Season	League			National cup		Europe		Other		Total	
Club	Season	Division	Apps	Goals	Apps	Goals	Apps	Goals	Apps	Goals	Apps	Goals
Baník Ostrava	1994–95	Czech First League	1	0			–		–		1	0
Baník Ostrava	1995–96	Czech First League	9	1			–		–		9	1
Baník Ostrava	1996–97	Czech First League	21	1			–		–		21	1
Baník Ostrava	1997–98	Czech First League	26	3			–		–		26	3
Baník Ostrava	1998–99	Czech First League	26	2			–		–		26	2
Baník Ostrava	1999–2000	Czech First League	27	8			–		–		27	8
Baník Ostrava	Total		110	15	0	0	0	0	0	0	110	15
Napoli	2000–01	Serie A	20	3			–		–		20	3
Napoli	2001–02	Serie B	31	5	2	1	–		–		33	6
Napoli	Total		51	8	2	1	0	0	0	0	53	9
Udinese	2002–03	Serie A	27	5	2	0	–		–		29	5
Udinese	2003–04	Serie A	32	6	4	2	2 (Note: Appearances in UEFA Cup)	0	–		38	8
Udinese	2004–05	Serie A	32	4	3	0	2	0	–		38	4
Udinese	Total		91	15	9	2	4	0	0	0	104	17
AC Milan	2005–06	Serie A	22	1	4	0	2 (Note: Appearances in UEFA Champions League)	0	–		28	1
AC Milan	2006–07	Serie A	33	3	4	0	13	0	–		50	3
AC Milan	2007–08	Serie A	14	0	0	0	3	0	2 (Note: One appearance and one goal in UEFA Super Cup, one appearance in FIFA Club World Cup)	1	19	1
AC Milan	2008–09	Serie A	31	0	1	0	6	1	–		38	1
AC Milan	2009–10	Serie A	8	0	2	0	2	0	–		12	0
AC Milan	2010–11	Serie A	5	0	1	0	1	0	–		7	0
AC Milan	Total		113	4	12	0	27	1	2	1	154	6
Baník Ostrava	2011–12	Czech First League	1	0			–		–		1	0
Career total			366	42	23	3	31	1	2	1	421	47

=== International ===
Appearances and goals by national team and year

National team	Year	Apps	Goals
Czech Republic	2000	4	0
Czech Republic	2001	7	2
Czech Republic	2002	5	1
Czech Republic	2003	8	3
Czech Republic	2004	14	0
Czech Republic	2005	6	1
Czech Republic	2006	12	1
Czech Republic	2007	6	2
Czech Republic	2008	10	1
Czech Republic	2009	6	1
Czech Republic	Total	78	12

== Honours ==
Milan

- Serie A: 2010–11
- UEFA Champions League: 2006–07
- UEFA Super Cup: 2007
- FIFA Club World Cup: 2007
