= David Pizarro =

Chilean footballer (born 1979)

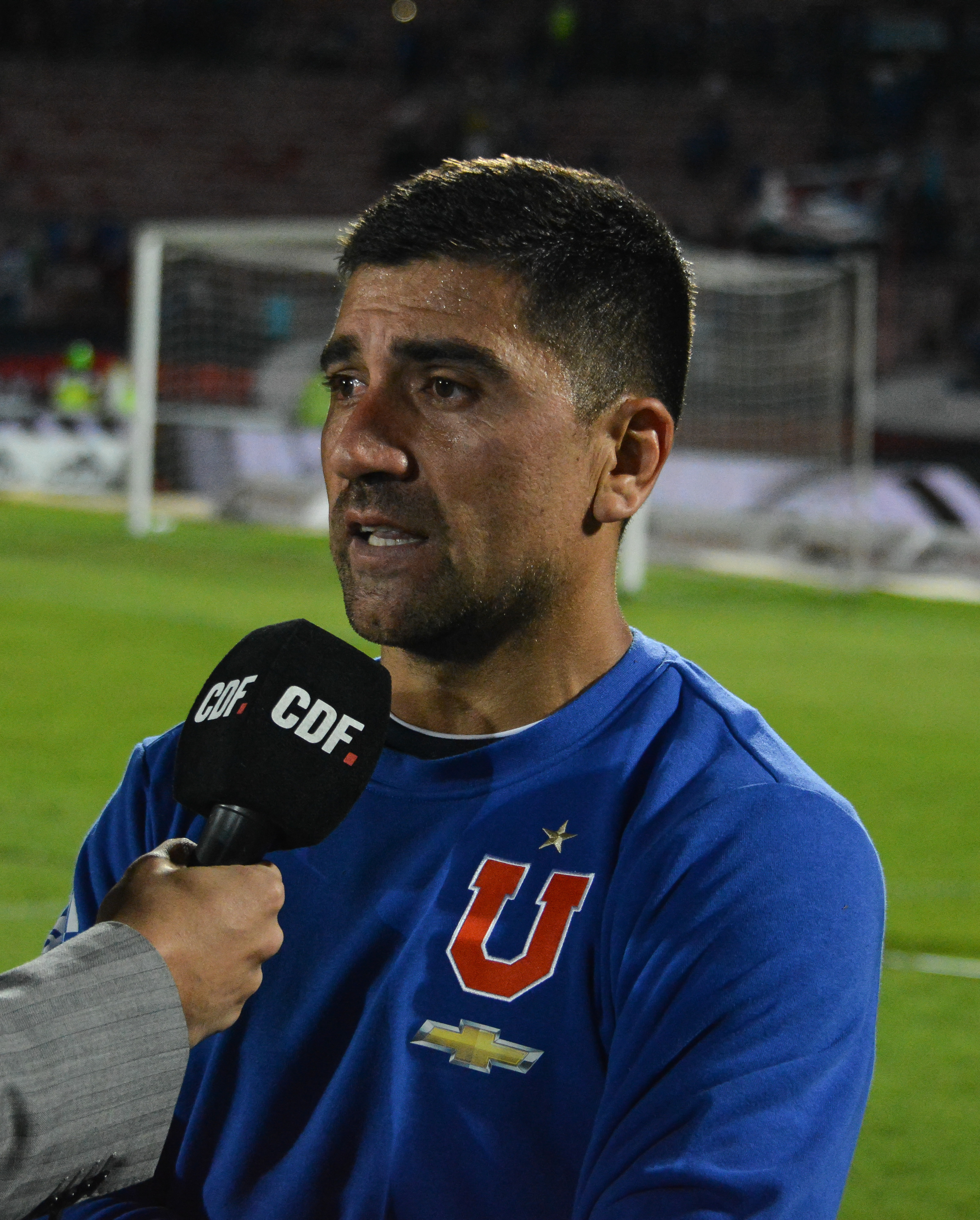
- Pizarro with Universidad de Chile in 2018

Personal information
- Full name: David Marcelo Pizarro Cortez
- Date of birth: 11 September 1979 (age 47)
- Place of birth: Valparaíso, Chile
- Height: 1.68 m (5 ft 6 in)
- Position: Midfielder

Youth career
- Caupolicán
- Santiago Wanderers

Senior career*
Years	Team	Apps	(Gls)
1997–1998	Santiago Wanderers	41	(3)
1999–2005	Udinese	126	(14)
2001	→ Universidad de Chile (loan)	6	(1)
2005–2006	Inter Milan	24	(1)
2006–2012	Roma	148	(9)
2012	→ Manchester City (loan)	5	(0)
2012–2015	Fiorentina	83	(4)
2015–2016	Santiago Wanderers	9	(0)
2017–2018	Universidad de Chile	52	(5)
Total		494	(37)

International career
1995	Chile U17		
1999	Chile U20	9	(3)
2000	Chile U23	13	(2)
2001	Chile B	1	(0)
1999–2015	Chile	46	(2)
Medal record
Representing Chile
Third place	Summer Olympics	2000
Winner	Copa América	2015
- * Club domestic league appearances and goals

David Marcelo Pizarro Cortez (born 11 September 1979) is a Chilean former professional footballer who played as a midfielder. He was usually deployed as a central midfielder, although he could also operate in a holding role in front of the back-line, in a more attacking position in the hole behind the strikers, or even as a deep-lying playmaker. An intelligent and technically gifted player, who possessed significant physical strength in spite of his diminutive stature, and an ability to dictate play in midfield, Pizarro was known in particular for his vision, range of passing, dribbling skills, and ability from set pieces.

Pizarro began his career in Chile with Santiago Wanderers, and later also played for Universidad de Chile in his home country; he later had spells with several Italian clubs, and also briefly played on loan with English side Manchester City in 2012, before returning to Chile in 2015. During his stay in Italian football, he won one Serie A title (2005–06), three Coppa Italia titles and two Supercoppa Italiana titles, while playing for Inter Milan and Roma; he also played for Udinese and Fiorentina during his time in Italy. His Italian nickname is "Pek", diminutive of "pequeño", meaning "small" in Spanish, because of his short stature (1.68 metres).

Pizarro played for the Chile national team, with which he won the bronze medal at 2000 Summer Olympics, and played at two Copa América tournaments. He made his full debut in 1999, playing at that year's Copa América, and was part of the Chilean squad which won its first-ever tournament in 2015.

In November 2018, he announced his retirement from professional football. His last match was on 2 December, as a captain of Universidad de Chile, against Curicó Unido.

== Club career ==
=== Early career and Inter Milan ===
Pizarro began his career at Santiago Wanderers in his hometown Valparaíso. After a season playing at Seaport Team since his promotion to the first-adult team in 1997, he joined Udinese of the Italian Serie A. In 2001, he was loaned to Chilean powerhouse Universidad de Chile to gain experience. Once back in Friuli, he settled as the Udinese's starting central midfielder, performing well during his five seasons there.

On 14 July 2005, Pizarro joined Inter Milan for a reported €10 million transfer (plus half the rights of striker Goran Pandev, whom Lazio purchased one year later for €4 million) on a four-year contract. At Inter, he failed to repeat his successful campaigns at Udinese, at times being overshadowed by Argentine star Juan Sebastián Verón. Nonetheless, Pizarro won the 2005–06 Serie A with Inter, plus the Coppa Italia and Supercoppa Italiana.

=== Roma ===
On 19 August 2006, Roma acquired 50% of Pizarro's rights, agreeing to a €6.5 million transfer fee for a four-year co-ownership deal. On his arrival, he chose shirt number 7 and reunited with his former head coach at Udinese, Luciano Spalletti.

On 12 September 2006, Pizarro scored his first competitive goal for Roma in a 4–0 UEFA Champions League victory over Shakhtar Donetsk in the 89th minute. Five days later, he scored twice in a 3–1 Serie A win over Siena. He also helped Roma win the 2006–07 Coppa Italia title, where was one of the team top-scorers with three goals. On 20 June 2007, Roma announced they paid Inter the remaining 50% of Pizarro's rights to keep him at the club until 2010. The next season, he was an undisputed starter with Daniele De Rossi in midfield, making over 30 league appearances as well as in the UEFA Champions League, where he scored a goal in a 2–1 win over Real Madrid to seal the club's progression to the quarter-finals. Pizarro also won the Coppa Italia with Roma that season.

In October 2009, Pizarro signed a contract extension which was to keep him at the club until June 2013. He finished the 2009–10 season with two goals and eight assists in 31 appearances, helping Roma finish second in Serie A behind eventual winners Inter.

=== Manchester City ===
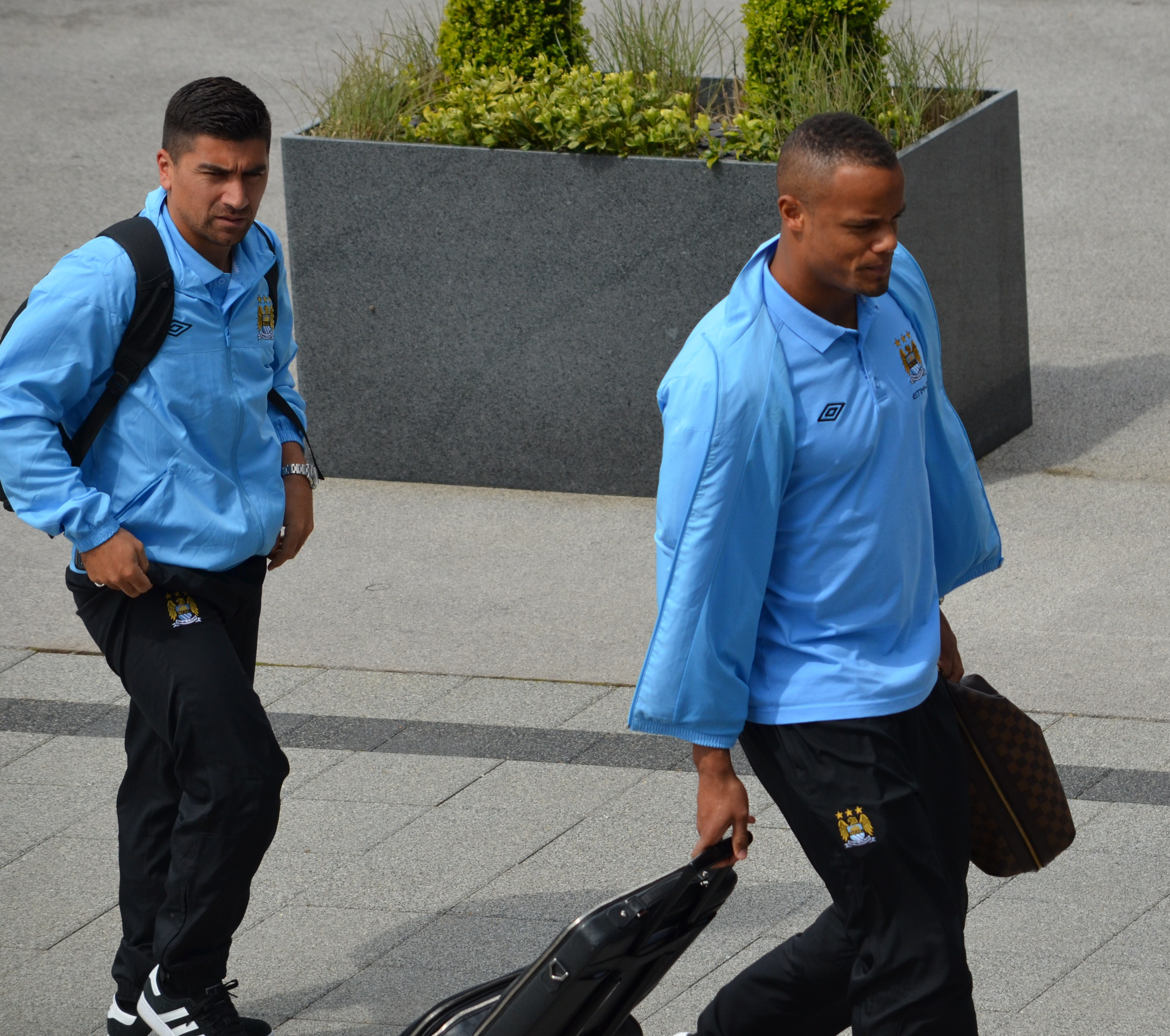
Pizarro and Vincent Kompany arriving at a Manchester City match in May 2012

On 31 January 2012, Pizarro signed for Manchester City on loan from Roma for the remainder of the 2011–12 season, reuniting his former head manager at Inter, Roberto Mancini. Pizarro made his debut four days later as an added-time substitute for Adam Johnson in City's 3–0 win against Fulham, becoming the first Chilean to play for Manchester City. On 22 February, he came off the substitutes' bench to score and had an assist against Porto in the UEFA Europa League as City won 4–0 in the second leg of the tie, having won 2–1 in the away leg.

On 13 May 2012, Manchester City were crowned Premier League champions for 2011–12 after defeating Queens Park Rangers 3–2. However, Pizarro only made five league appearances that season, not enough for a winners' medal. His loan spell with City came to an end and returned to Roma, after which he vowed not to move again.

=== Fiorentina ===
On 9 August 2012, Pizarro transferred to Fiorentina on a two-year contract. He played 83 times for Fiorentina, scoring four goals.

Pizarro was an unused substitute in the 2014 Coppa Italia Final, which Fiorentina lost 3–1 to Napoli.

=== Santiago Wanderers ===
Pizarro returned to Chile to join Santiago Wanderers on a two-year contract.

== International career ==
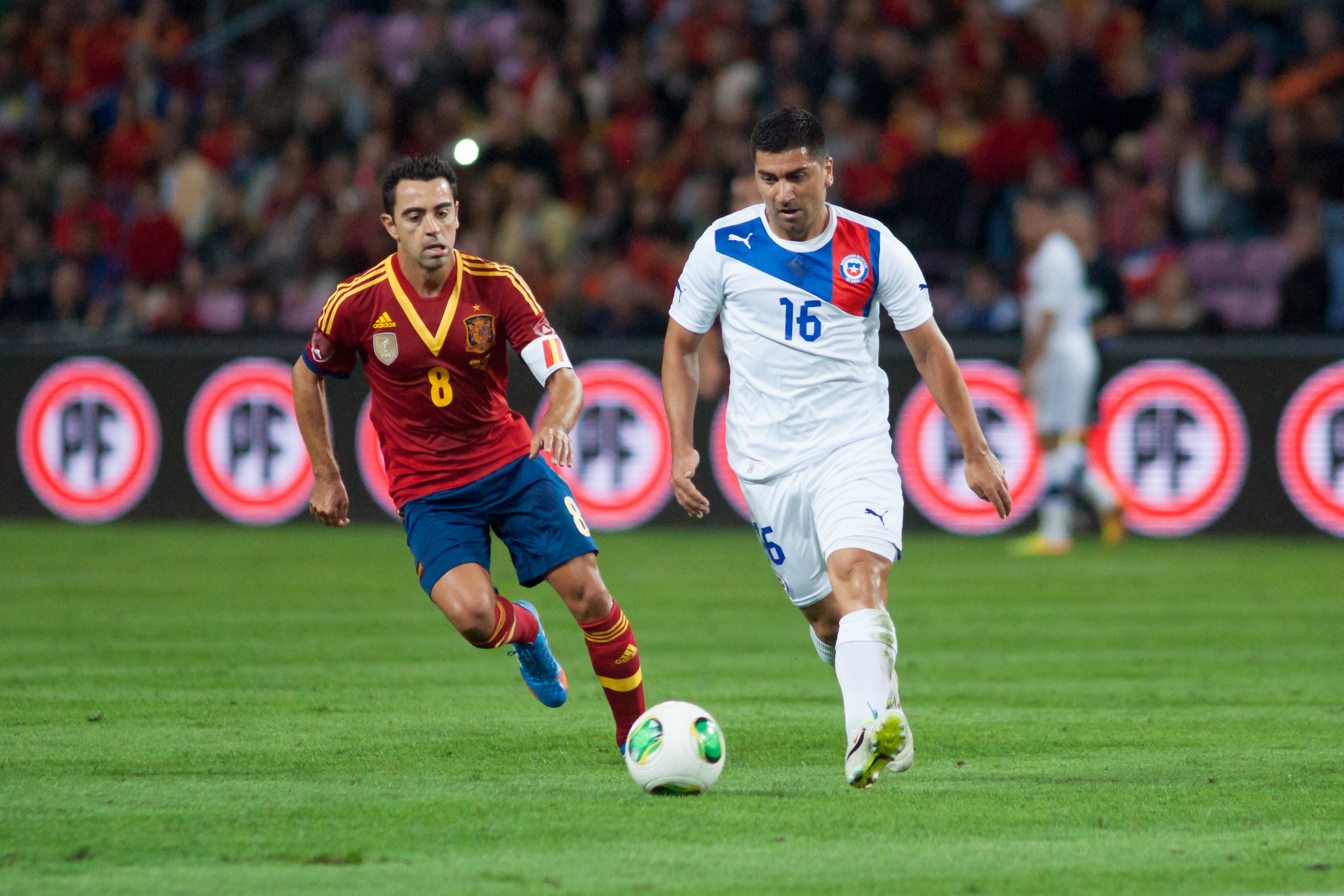
Pizarro and Xavi in a match between Chile and Spain on 10 September 2013

At youth level, Pizarro represented Chile at under-17 level in the 1995 South American Championship and at under-20 level in the 1999 South American Championship.

At senior level, Pizarro began his international career in 1999. After being one of the best players of the South American Youth Championship that year, Chile manager Nelson Acosta gave him an opportunity in the senior team.

He played in the 1999 Copa America and also the 2000 Summer Olympics, where he won the bronze medal. He also participated in the 2002 and 2006 World Cup qualifiers, with Chile failing to qualify on both occasions.

In 2001, he made an appearance for Chile B in the friendly match against Catalonia on 28 December.

After failing to qualifying for the 2006 FIFA World Cup in Germany, Pizarro announced his retirement from international football, listing several reasons for his decision. He disliked ex-coach Juvenal Olmos and ex-association president Reinaldo Sánchez.4 Also, he believed the players on the national team played solely to gain popularity. He also said he wished to spend more time with his family.

On 20 May 2013, Pizarro was called up to the national team for the 2014 World Cup qualifiers, returning to the Chile squad after having meetings with head coach Jorge Sampaoli, thus ending his eight-year absence from international football. After failing to be named to Chile's 23-man squad list for the World Cup, he was part of the 2015 Copa América-winning squad.

== Personal life ==
His father, David Pizarro Inostroza, is a former amateur midfielder who played for Caupolicán from Caleta El Membrillo, Valparaíso, the club where David Marcelo started to play football.

His son, Bastián David Pizarro Gómez, born in 2003 in Udine, is a footballer trained at Everton de Viña del Mar and Santiago Wanderers who returned to Italy in 2024 to play for Fiumicino. In August 2025, he switched to AS Pescatori Ostia.

== Post-retirement ==
In October 2021, Pizarro graduated as a football manager in Italy.

On 2 January 2025, Pizarro joined Kings League Italia club Boomers.

== Career statistics ==
=== Club ===
As of 12 August 2018

Appearances and goals by club, season and competition
Club	Season	League			National cup		League cup		Continental		Other		Total	
Club	Season	Division	Apps	Goals	Apps	Goals	Apps	Goals	Apps	Goals	Apps	Goals	Apps	Goals
Santiago Wanderers	1997	Primera División	18	0			—		—		—		18	0
Santiago Wanderers	1998	Primera División	23	3			—		—		—		23	3
Santiago Wanderers	Total		41	3			0	0	0	0	0	0	41	3
Udinese	1998–99	Serie A	0	0	0	0	—		0	0	—		0	0
Udinese	1999–2000	Serie A	5	0	2	0	—		0	0	—		7	0
Udinese	2000–01	Serie A	4	0	1	0	—		0	0	—		5	0
Udinese	2001–02	Serie A	31	2	4	1	—		—		—		35	3
Udinese	2002–03	Serie A	33	7	1	1	—		—		—		34	8
Udinese	2003–04	Serie A	19	3	1	0	—		2 (Note: Appearances in UEFA Cup / UEFA Europa League)	0	—		22	3
Udinese	2004–05	Serie A	34	2	4	0	—		2	0	—		40	2
Udinese	Total		126	14	13	2	0	0	4	0	0	0	143	16
Universidad de Chile (loan)	2001	Primera División	6	1			—		2 (Note: Appearances in Copa Libertadores)	2	—		8	3
Inter Milan	2005–06	Serie A	24	1	7	1	—		8 (Note: Appearances in UEFA Champions League)	1	1 (Note: Appearance in Supercoppa Italiana)	0	40	3
Roma	2006–07	Serie A	32	1	7	3	—		7	1	—		46	5
Roma	2007–08	Serie A	31	3	5	0	—		10	1	—		46	4
Roma	2008–09	Serie A	25	2	1	0	—		5	0	1	0	32	2
Roma	2009–10	Serie A	31	2	4	0	—		11	1	—		46	3
Roma	2010–11	Serie A	22	1	2	0	—		5	0	1	0	30	1
Roma	2011–12	Serie A	7	0	0	0	—		0	0	—		7	0
Roma	Total		148	9	19	3	0	0	38	3	2	0	207	15
Manchester City (loan)	2011–12	Premier League	5	0	0	0	0	0	2	1	—		7	1
Fiorentina	2012–13	Serie A	29	3	2	0	—		—		—		31	3
Fiorentina	2013–14	Serie A	28	1	5	0	—		9	0	—		42	1
Fiorentina	2014–15	Serie A	26	0	1	0	—		10	0	—		37	0
Fiorentina	Total		83	4	8	0	0	0	19	0	0	0	110	4
Santiago Wanderers	2015–16	Primera División	9	0	0	0	—		0	0	—		11	0
Santiago Wanderers	2016–17	Primera División	0	0	2	0	—		—		—		2	0
Santiago Wanderers	Total		9	0	2	0	0	0	0	0	0	0	11	0
Universidad de Chile	2016–17	Primera División	14	0	0	0	—		0	0	—		14	0
Universidad de Chile	2017	Primera División	14	3	9	1	—		2 (Note: Appearances in Copa Sudamericana)	0	—		25	4
Universidad de Chile	2018	Primera División	24	2	7	0	—		5	1	—		36	3
Universidad de Chile	Total		52	5	16	1	0	0	7	1	0	0	75	7
Career total			494	37	65	7	0	0	80	8	3	0	642	52

=== International ===
Appearances and goals by national team and year
National team	Year	Apps	Goals
Chile	1999	9	1
Chile	2000	11	1
Chile	2001	1	0
Chile	2003	3	0
Chile	2004	4	0
Chile	2005	8	0
Chile	2013	4	0
Chile	2015	6	0
Total		46	2

Scores and results list Templatonia's goal tally first, score column indicates score after each Pizarro goal.

List of international goals scored by David Pizarro
No.	Date	Venue	Opponent	Score	Result	Competition
1	28 April 1999	Estadio Félix Capriles, Cochabamba, Bolivia	Bolivia	1–1	1–1	Friendly
2	22 March 2000	Estadio Nacional, Santiago, Chile	Honduras	4–2	5–2	Friendly

== Honours ==
Inter Milan

- Serie A: 2005–06
- Coppa Italia: 2005–06
- Supercoppa Italiana: 2005

Roma

- Coppa Italia: 2006–07, 2007–08
- Supercoppa Italiana: 2007

Universidad de Chile

- Chilean Primera División: 2017 Clausura

Chile U23

- Summer Olympic Games bronze medal: 2000

Chile

- Copa América: 2015
