= Dino Fava =

Italian footballer (born 1977)

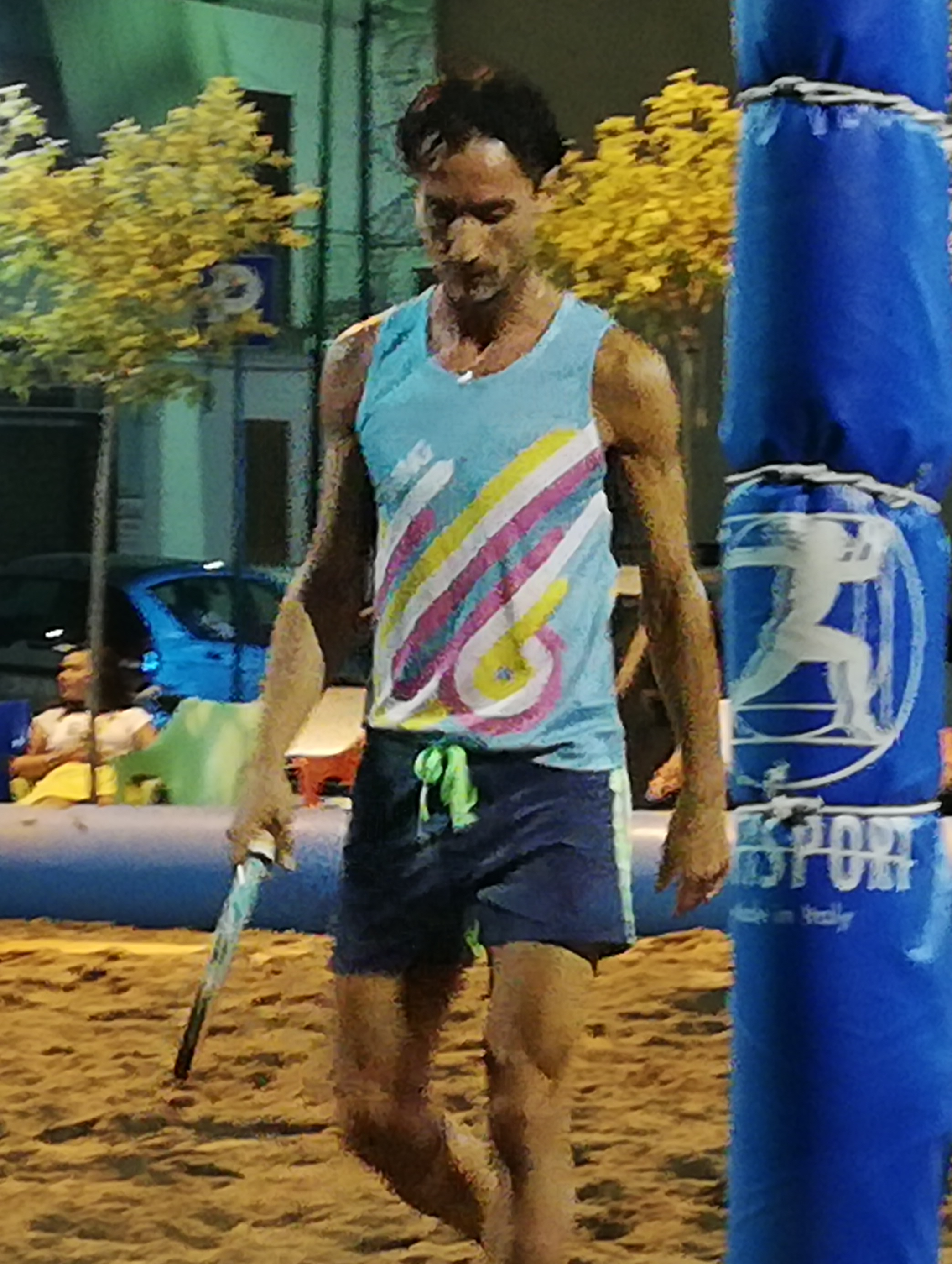

Personal information
- Full name: Dino Fava Passaro
- Date of birth: 16 March 1977 (age 49)
- Place of birth: Formia, Italy
- Height: 1.83 m (6 ft 0 in)
- Position: Striker

Team information
- Current team: Savoia

Senior career*
Years	Team	Apps	(Gls)
1995–1996	Formia	19	(3)
1996–1999	Napoli	0	(0)
1997–1998	→ Acireale (loan)	25	(0)
1999–2000	Pro Patria	31	(12)
2000–2002	Varese	63	(22)
2002–2003	Triestina	38	(22)
2003–2005	Udinese	55	(14)
2005–2007	Treviso	59	(13)
2007–2008	Bologna	23	(0)
2008–2009	Treviso	0	(0)
2008–2009	→ Salernitana (loan)	22	(6)
2009–2011	Salernitana	49	(10)
2011–2013	Paganese	58	(10)
2013–2014	Terracina	25	(8)
2014–2015	US Sessana	27	(10)
2016–2017	Portici 1906		(14)
2017–2018	Savoia		
2018–2019	Giugliano		
2019–2021	Afragolese	28	(5)
2021–2022	Maddalonese		
2022–	Sessana		
- * Club domestic league appearances and goals as of 13 June 2021

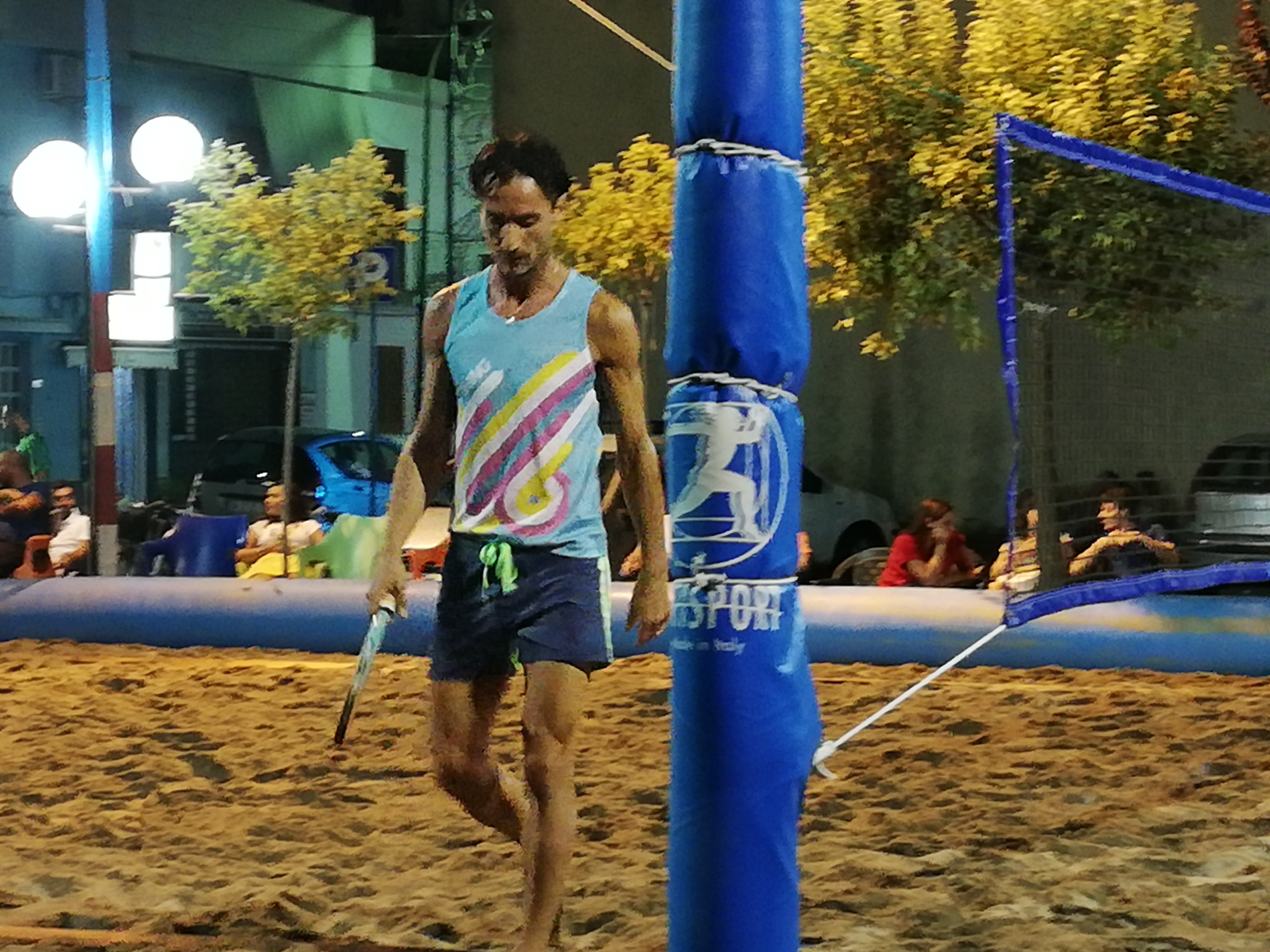

Dino Fava Passaro (born 16 March 1977) is an Italian footballer who plays as a striker for amateur side Sessana.

== Career ==
Fava started his career at Formia in Serie C2. He was signed by S.S.C. Napoli in summer 1996. He was loaned to Acireale of Serie C1 in the summer of 1997, joining Serie C2's Pro Patria during the 1999–2000 season, and Varese in Serie C1 the next year.

In summer 2002, Triestina of Serie B signed Fava in joint-ownership bid, and he finished runner-up top scorer in 2002-03. In the summer, he permanently transferred to Udinese, where he made his Serie A debut on 21 September 2003, against Bologna.

In summer 2005, newly promoted Serie A team Treviso signed Fava in joint-ownership bid. Although only scored 3 league goals, he earned a permanent move in June 2006.

In August 2007, Fava transferred to Bologna (then in the second division), in another joint-ownership bid, for €900,000. He was bought back in June 2008 for €900,000.

In July 2008, Fava joined newly promoted Serie B team Salernitana. After the bankruptcy of Treviso, he joined Salernitana in September, signed a 2-year contract.

In August 2011 he joined Paganese.
