= Vincenzo Iaquinta =

Italian footballer (born 1979)

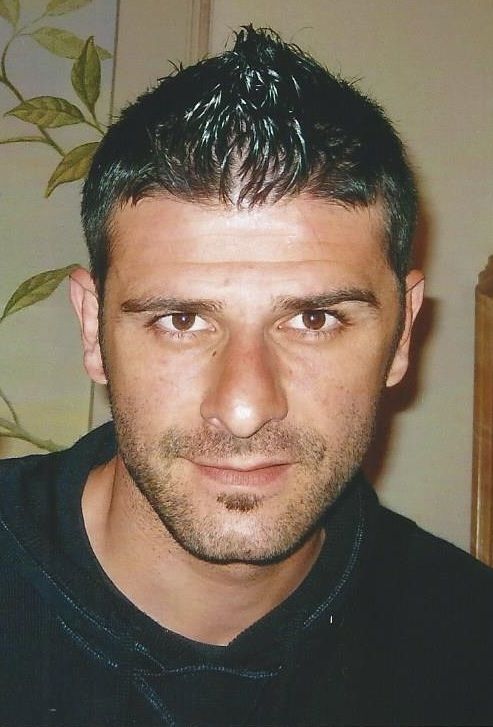
- Iaquinta in 2010

Personal information
- Full name: Vincenzo Iaquinta
- Date of birth: 21 November 1979 (age 47)
- Place of birth: Cutro, Italy
- Height: 1.91 m (6 ft 3 in)
- Position: Striker

Senior career*
Years	Team	Apps	(Gls)
1996–1997	Reggiolo	33	(6)
1998	Padova	13	(3)
1998–2000	Castel di Sangro	52	(8)
2000–2007	Udinese	176	(58)
2007–2013	Juventus	86	(30)
2012	→ Cesena (loan)	7	(1)
Total		374	(106)

International career
2005–2010	Italy	40	(6)
Medal record
Men's football
Representing Italy
FIFA World Cup
Winner	2006 Germany
- * Club domestic league appearances and goals

Vincenzo Iaquinta Ufficiale OMRI (Italian pronunciation: [vinˈtʃɛntso jaˈkwinta]; born 21 November 1979) is an Italian former professional footballer who played as a striker.

Prior to joining Juventus in 2007, he initially played for several smaller Italian clubs, and subsequently moved to Udinese in 2000, where he spent seven seasons, representing the club in the UEFA Champions League. After failing to make an appearance under new manager Antonio Conte during the first half of the 2011–12 season, in January 2012, he was sent on a half-season loan to Cesena; he returned to Juventus the following season, but once again made no appearances due to injury as the club won the league title; he subsequently retired from football in 2013.

Iaquinta played 40 matches for the Italy national football team between 2005 and 2010, scoring six goals. He was included in their squad which won the 2006 FIFA World Cup, as well as the team for the 2010 edition of the tournament, scoring a goal on each occasion; he also took part at the 2009 FIFA Confederations Cup with Italy.

== Club career ==
=== Reggiolo ===
Iaquinta was born in Cutro, in the province of Crotone. Like many Calabrians in the 1980s, his parents migrated to Emilia-Romagna in Northern Italy for better job opportunities. Iaquinta played with his brother in the lower divisions for Reggiolo for the 1996–1997 season, before transferring to Serie B club Padova in January 1998, after 33 appearances and six goals in his first professional season and a half.

=== Padova ===
Iaquinta moved to Padova in January 1998, a club where his future Juventus teammate and Italian legend Alessandro Del Piero thrived, but his spell with Padova was short-lived as after only six months, just 13 appearances and three goals, Iaquinta was surprisingly sold to Serie C1 club, Castel di Sangro.

=== Castel di Sangro ===
Following his short spell in Serie B, Iaquinta went on to spend two seasons in the Italian Serie C1, with Castel di Sangro from 1998 and 2000. It was with his new club where Iaquinta established himself, making 52 appearances as he became a key part of the starting line-up, and netting eight goals. Following several impressive performances, Iaquinta was signed by Udinese of Serie A.

=== Udinese ===
In June 2000, Udinese completed the signing of the young prospect and in his first season with the club, Iaquinta made 16 appearances and scored two goals. The following season, he made 26 appearances with three goals, before breaking into the starting eleven in his third season. He scored eight goals in 28 appearances and the following season (2002–03), in which Udinese finished in sixth and qualified for the UEFA Cup. Iaquinta made 32 appearances and scored eleven goals during the 2003–2004 season, as his team again reached the UEFA Cup, this time in 7th.

During the 2004–05 season, he made 39 appearances and scored 15 goals, as Udinese came in fourth in Serie A and therefore qualified for the UEFA Champions League. That following season, Iaquinta made 34 appearances with 17 goals, including a hat-trick in his first UEFA Champions League group stage match against Panathinaikos. Although he refused to sign a contract extension at the start of the season, on 30 September he agreed terms for a further three years. In his final season, 2006–07, he scored 14 goals for his club in 30 appearances, and formed a partnership with Antonio Di Natale. Following a string of impressive seasons with Udinese, he was signed by Juventus.

=== Juventus ===
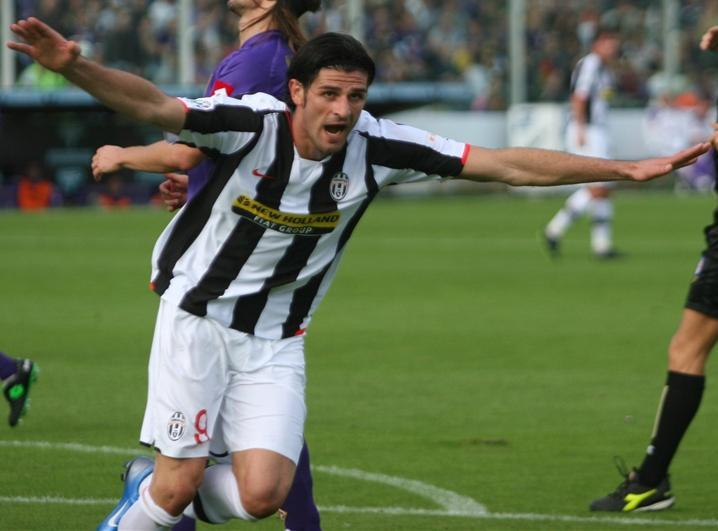
Iaquinta celebrating a goal for Juventus, 2007

Juventus signed Iaquinta on a five-year contract on 19 June 2007 for a fee of €11.3 million. (cash plus Michele Paolucci), to become the Turin giant's first signing for the new campaign. Udinese also bought back Fabio Quagliarella from Sampdoria on 21 June; Sampdoria then bought Andrea Caracciolo from Palermo on 22 June and Palermo bought Fabrizio Miccoli from Juventus on 5 July.

During the 2007–08 season, Iaquinta made only a handful of starts for Juventus, mostly being used as back-up to the experienced strike partners Alessandro Del Piero and David Trezeguet, who combined to score 41 goals between them in the Serie A alone. He did however still manage 29 appearances with nine often crucial goals, such as his last minute winner versus Napoli in April 2008. It appeared that he might be surplus to requirements after the signing of Brazilian striker Amauri, leading to rumours about a possible move out of Juventus. However, nothing materialised, and Iaquinta remained for the 2008–09 season. Iaquinta also signed a new 4-year contract near the end of 2008–09 season.

Iaquinta started the season as fourth-choice striker, but enjoyed a particularly impressive string of performances when both Amauri and Trezeguet were injured, gaining a more regular place under Claudio Ranieri. Most notably, he scored the first goal against Chelsea in the second leg of the first knockout stage of the UEFA Champions League, which was also Juventus' 600th goal in European competition. Despite this, Juve could only draw the match 2–2, and were eliminated. After that, Iaquinta also played regularly in Serie A games, his situation helped by a falling-out between Trezeguet and head coach Claudio Ranieri. In his second season in Piedmont, the striker managed 38 appearances with 16 goals. Following the sacking of Ranieri, and the appointment of Ciro Ferrara for the 2009–10 season, Iaquinta became an undisputed starter, before a major injury side-lined him for six months between October 2009 and March 2010. In 2010–11 Serie A, Juventus renewed its squad by selling Trezeguet but also signing Quagliarella. That season Iaquinta made only eight starts (seven in first half season). Despite the injury of Quagliarella in mid-season, the arrival of Alessandro Matri made Iaquinta was a substitute in the second half of season.

Under new coach Antonio Conte in 2011, Iaquinta, Amauri and Luca Toni did not play a single minute on the pitch and Iaquinta was the third one to leave Turin on 31 January.

==== Cesena loan and Juventus return ====
On 31 January 2012, Iaquinta joined Cesena on loan until the end of the 2011–12 season. He made his debut for them on 9 February away at Lazio, and assisted Adrian Mutu for the first goal and scored a penalty to put Cesena 2–0 up at half-time, but they eventually lost 3–2. In total, he made seven appearances for the club, although his time with Cesena was once again characterised by injuries, and he was unable to save the club from relegation.

At the end of the season he returned to his home club Juventus, who had just won the league title, although he continued to struggle with injuries, and once again failed to make a single appearance under Conte during the 2012–13 Serie A season, as Juventus won a second consecutive league title. On 22 July 2013, following the end of his contract with the club, he announced his retirement, stating his intention to pursue a coaching career.

== International career ==
Iaquinta made his international debut for Italy on 30 March 2005, as a half-time substitute for Luca Toni in a 0–0 home friendly draw against Iceland at the Stadio Euganeo in Padua.

Iaquinta was a member of the Italian squad that won the 2006 FIFA World Cup under manager Marcello Lippi. His first international goal came in his nation's opening match of the tournament, on 12 June: Iaquinta scored Italy's second goal in the 2–0 victory against Ghana. He played in 5 out of 7 of Italy's matches, including the victorious semi-final against hosts Germany and final against France on 9 July, in which he came on after 61 minutes for Simone Perrotta. Iaquinta missed out on Roberto Donadoni's Italy squad for Euro 2008 due to injury. He later took part at the 2009 FIFA Confederations Cup, and he also played for Italy in the 2010 FIFA World Cup, in which he scored a penalty in a 1–1 draw against New Zealand in the second group match. His 40th and final international appearance came in the last group game on 24 June, in which Italy were defeated 3–2 by Slovakia and eliminated from the tournament. In total, he scored six goals for Italy.

== Style of play ==
In his prime, Iaquinta was a tall, physically strong, opportunistic and extremely fast striker, who excelled in the air and at finishing off chances inside the penalty area. Due to his great pace, athleticism, work-rate, tenacity and good movement off the ball, he was also known for his ability to make attacking runs to beat the defensive line and either get on the end of his teammates' passes or provide depth and create space for his team; his speed and timing also made him a dangerous offensive threat on counter-attacks. Although his preferred role was that of a striker, he was a versatile forward who was capable of playing in several offensive positions, and was also used as a second striker, or as a winger. Due to his strength, he excelled at playing with his back to goal, and at holding the ball up for teammates. Iaquinta was often injury-prone throughout his career, which frequently limited his playing time.

== Personal life ==
Iaquinta has been married to Arianna Cucinotta since 14 June 2003. He and his wife have four children, two sons and two daughters: Giuseppe, born on 17 December 2002, Edoardo, born on 28 June 2004, Carlotta, born on 20 May 2008, and Ginevra, born on 23 April 2015.

=== Criminal allegations and conviction ===
During the Aemilia antimafia investigation, on 4 February 2015 illegal weapons were found at Iaquinta's Quattro Castella home and his father Giuseppe's home. On 21 December 2015, they were both sent to trial for the illegal possession of firearms, aggravated by the aiding of the Calabrian Mafia organization 'Ndrangheta expand to Northern Italy, of which his father was charged with association with the 'Ndrangheta through the 'Ndrina of Nicolino Grande Aracri. On 31 October 2018, Iaquinta was found guilty of illegal possession of firearms, and sentenced to two years imprisonment; his father was found guilty of mafia association, and received 19 years imprisonment.

== Career statistics ==
=== Club ===
Appearances and goals by club, season and competition
Club	Season	League		Cup		Europe		Total	
Club	Season	Apps	Goals	Apps	Goals	Apps	Goals	Apps	Goals
Reggiolo	1996–97	14	1	0	0	0	0	14	1
Reggiolo	1997–98	19	5	0	0	0	0	19	5
Reggiolo	Total	33	6	0	0	0	0	33	6
Padova	1997–98	13	3	0	0	0	0	13	3
Castel di Sangro	1998–99	25	3	3	0	0	0	28	3
Castel di Sangro	1999–2000	27	5	0	0	0	0	27	5
Castel di Sangro	Total	52	8	3	0	0	0	55	8
Udinese	2000–01	14	2	2	0	0	0	16	2
Udinese	2001–02	22	2	4	1	0	0	26	3
Udinese	2002–03	26	7	2	1	0	0	28	8
Udinese	2003–04	29	11	2	0	1	0	32	11
Udinese	2004–05	31	13	6	2	2	0	39	15
Udinese	2005–06	24	9	1	1	9	7	34	17
Udinese	2006–07	30	14	2	3	0	0	32	17
Udinese	Total	176	58	19	8	12	7	207	73
Juventus	2007–08	24	8	5	4	0	0	29	12
Juventus	2008–09	28	12	3	0	7	3	38	15
Juventus	2009–10	15	6	0	0	3	1	18	7
Juventus	2010–11	20	4	1	0	3	2	24	6
Juventus	2011–12	0	0	0	0	0	0	0	0
Juventus	2012–13	0	0	0	0	0	0	0	0
Juventus	Total	88	30	9	4	13	6	109	40
Cesena (loan)	2011–12	7	1	0	0	0	0	7	1
Career total		368	105	31	9	25	13	424	131

=== International ===
Appearances and goals by national team and year
National team	Year	Apps	Goals
Italy	2005	10	0
Italy	2006	9	1
Italy	2007	3	0
Italy	2008	3	0
Italy	2009	10	4
Italy	2010	5	1
Total		40	6

Scores and results list Italy's goal tally first, score column indicates score after each Iaquinta goal.

List of international goals scored by Vincenzo Iaquinta
No.	Date	Venue	Opponent	Score	Result	Competition	Ref.
1	12 June 2006	FIFA WM Stadion Hannover, Hanover, Germany	Ghana	2–0	2–0	2006 FIFA World Cup	
2	1 April 2009	Stadio San Nicola, Bari, Italy	Republic of Ireland	1–0	1–1	2010 FIFA World Cup qualification	
3	10 June 2009	Atteridgeville Super Stadium, Pretoria, South Africa	New Zealand	3–3	4–3	Friendly	
4	10 June 2009	Atteridgeville Super Stadium, Pretoria, South Africa	New Zealand	4–3	4–3	Friendly	
5	9 September 2009	Stadio Olimpico, Turin, Italy	Bulgaria	2–0	2–0	2010 FIFA World Cup qualification	
6	20 June 2010	Mbombela Stadium, Nelspruit, South Africa	New Zealand	1–1	1–1	2010 FIFA World Cup	

== Honours ==
Juventus

- Serie A: 2012–13

Italy

- FIFA World Cup: 2006

Individual

- Coppa Italia top scorer: 2007–08

Orders

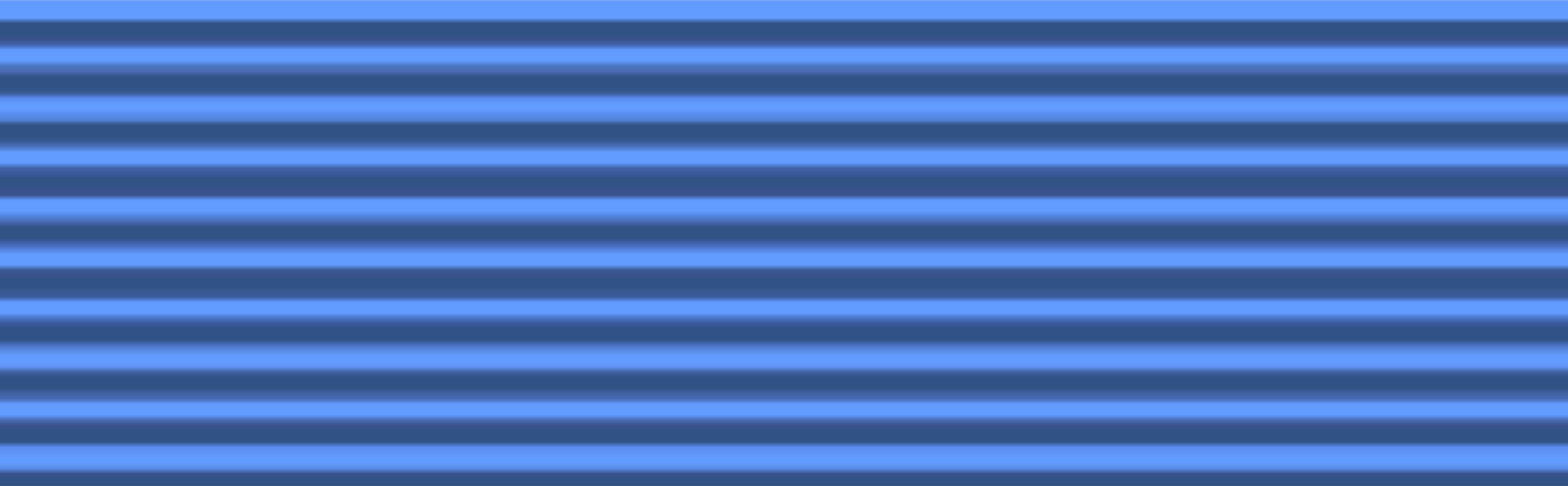
- CONI: Golden Collar of Sports Merit: 2006

- 4th Class / Officer: Ufficiale Ordine al Merito della Repubblica Italiana: 2006
