= Mirko Pieri =

Italian footballer and manager

Personal information
- Date of birth: 24 July 1978 (age 48)
- Place of birth: Grosseto, Italy
- Height: 1.83 m (6 ft 0 in)
- Positions: Left back; left winger

Youth career
- Grosseto

Senior career*
Years	Team	Apps	(Gls)
1995–2000	Grosseto	150	(3)
2000–2001	Perugia	33	(0)
2001–2006	Udinese	90	(1)
2006–2009	Sampdoria	87	(0)
2009–2012	Livorno	53	(0)
2014–2015	Camaiore	34	(0)

Managerial career
- 2013–2014: Grosseto (Allievi Nazionali)
- 2016–: Capezzano (Giovanissimi Elite)
- * Club domestic league appearances and goals

Mirko Pieri (born 24 July 1978) is an Italian football manager and former player, who played as a defender or midfielder.

== Playing career ==
Pieri joined Sampdoria in July 2006 along with Fabio Quagliarella, as part of the deal to sign Salvatore Foti. In June 2008 Sampdoria acquired Pieri outright.

Pieri was then signed by Livorno in July 2009 for €300,000.

Pieri had a trial at the English Football League Championship club Middlesbrough F.C. in 2010, but Boro boss Gordon Strachan stated on the club's official website that Pieri will not be offered a deal.

== Style of play ==
Primarily a left-sided attacking full-back or wing-back, Pieri was also capable of playing in a more advanced midfield role as a winger, on either flank, due to his dynamism, work-rate, energy, and tactical versatility, and was effective both offensively and defensively.
