= 2002–03 Brescia Calcio season =

Brescia Calcio
2002–03 season
- Chairman: Luigi Corioni
- Manager: Carlo Mazzone
- Stadium: Stadio Mario Rigamonti
- Serie A: 9th (in Intertoto Cup)
- Coppa Italia: Second round
- Top goalscorer: Roberto Baggio (12)
Home colours	Away colours

During the 2002–03 Italian football season, Brescia competed in the Serie A.

== Kit ==
Brescia's kit was manufactured by British sports retailer Umbro and sponsored by Banca Lombarda.

== Squad ==
Note: Flags indicate national team as defined under FIFA eligibility rules; some limited exceptions apply. Players may hold more than one non-FIFA nationality.

No.	Pos.	Nation	Player
12	GK	ITA	Davide Micillo
—	GK	ITA	Matteo Sereni
15	DF	BRA	Fábio Bilica
3	DF	ITA	Dario Dainelli
30	DF	ITA	Simone Dallamano
16	DF	PAR	Víctor Hugo Mareco
2	DF	CRC	Gilberto Martínez
5	DF	ITA	Fabio Petruzzi
26	DF	ITA	Marco Pisano
6	DF	CRO	Anthony Seric
4	MF	GHA	Stephen Appiah
11	MF	ITA	Jonathan Bachini

No.	Pos.	Nation	Player
18	MF	ITA	Antonio Filippini
17	MF	ITA	Roberto Guana
8	MF	BRA	Matuzalém
19	MF	AUT	Markus Schopp
29	FW	ITA	Andrea Alberti
10	FW	ITA	Roberto Baggio
27	FW	ITA	Massimiliano Caputo
24	FW	ITA	Simone Del Nero
7	FW	MAR	Abderrazzak Jadid
21	FW	ALB	Igli Tare
9	FW	ITA	Luca Toni

=== Transfers ===
In
Pos.	Name	from	Type
GK	Matteo Sereni	Ipswich Town	loan
DF	Anthony Šerić	Hellas Verona	loan
DF	Gilberto Martínez	Deportivo Saprissa	
MF	Stephen Appiah	Parma F.C.	loan
MF	Matuzalém	Parma F.C.	loan
FW	Abderrazzak Jadid	A.C. Lumezzane	loan ended
FW	Massimiliano Caputo	Livingston F.C.	loan ended

Out
Pos.	Name	To	Type
MF	Josep Guardiola	A.S. Roma	
GK	Luca Castellazzi	Reggina Calcio	loan
DF	Daniele Bonera	Parma F.C.	
DF	Alessandro Calori	S.S.C. Venezia	
FW	Massimiliano Esposito	Chievo Verona	
MF	Federico Giunti	Besiktas	
MF	Andrés Yllana	Hellas Verona	
MF	Emanuele Filippini	Parma F.C.	
GK	Federico Agliardi	Cosenza	loan
DF	Andrea Sussi	Ternana Calcio	
MF	Jonathan Binotto	Como Calcio	
DF	Amedeo Mangone	Piacenza Calcio	
FW	Mario Salgado	Hellas Verona	loan
MF	Marius Stankevicius	Cosenza	loan

==== Winter ====
In
Pos.	Name	from	Type
MF	Josep Guardiola	A.S. Roma	loan
DF	Fabio Bilica	Palermo F.C.	loan

Out
Pos.	Name	To	Type
GK	Pavel Srnicek	Cosenza	loan
FW	Simone Del Nero	Palermo F.C.	loan
FW	Massimiliano Caputo	A.S.D. G.C. Sora	

== Competitions ==
=== Serie A ===
==== League table ====
Pos	Team	Pld	W	D	L	GF	GA	GD	Pts	Qualification or relegation
7	Chievo	34	16	7	11	51	39	+12	55	
8	Roma (Note: Roma qualified for the first round of the 2003-04 UEFA Cup as Coppa Italia runner-up because the winner, Milan, qualified for Champions League through championship position.)	34	13	10	11	55	46	+9	49	Qualification to UEFA Cup first round
9	Brescia	34	9	15	10	36	38	−2	42 (Note: Brescia finished ahead of Perugia on head-to-head points: Brescia 3–1 Perugia, Perugia 0–0 Brescia.)	Qualification to Intertoto Cup second round
10	Perugia (Note: Perugia gained entry to the 2003 UEFA Intertoto Cup after Chievo renounced; then they qualified to the 2003–04 UEFA Cup First round.)	34	10	12	12	40	48	−8	42	Qualification to Intertoto Cup third round
11	Bologna	34	10	11	13	39	47	−8	41	

Source: 2002–03 Serie A, Soccerway
Rules for classification: 1) Points; 2) Head-to-head points; 3) Head-to-head goal difference; 4) Goal difference; 5) Goals scored; 6) Draw. (Note: Head-to-head record is used only after all the matches between the teams in question have been played).

==== Results by round ====
Round	1	2	3	4	5	6	7	8	9	10	11	12	13	14	15	16	17	18	19	20	21	22	23	24	25	26	27	28	29	30	31	32	33	34
Ground	H	A	H	A	A	H	A	A	H	A	H	A	H	H	A	H	A	H	A	H	A	H	H	A	H	A	H	A	A	H	A	H	A	H
Result	L	W	L	D	L	D	W	L	L	L	D	L	W	W	D	D	D	D	W	D	D	W	D	D	W	D	W	D	L	L	D	W	L	D
Position	11	7	11	12	13	14	11	11	13	13	14	14	13	13	13	13	13	13	12	11	11	11	11	11	10	11	8	9	10	11	9	9	9	9

Source: Competitive matches
A = Away; H = Home; W = Win; D = Draw; L = Loss; = Leader, UEFA Champions League Groups stage; = UEFA Champions League Groups stage; = UEFA Champions League Qualifying round; = 2003–04 UEFA Cup; = 2003 UEFA Intertoto Cup; = 2003–04 Serie B

==== Matches ====
15 September 2002 1	Brescia	1–2	Piacenza	Brescia
20:30	Bachini 69'		Montaño 72'; Hübner 79'	Stadium: Stadio Mario Rigamonti

22 September 2002 2	Chievo	1–2	Brescia	Verona
15:00	Cossato 75'		Tare 57'; Šerić 88'	Stadium: Stadio Marcantonio Bentegodi

29 September 2002 3	Brescia	2–3	Roma	Brescia
15:00	R. Baggio 45+2' (pen.); Schopp 84'		Totti 30' (pen.), 41', 81'	Stadium: Stadio Mario Rigamonti

5 October 2002 4	Reggina	2–2	Brescia	Reggio Calabria
18:00	Pierini 43'; Nakamura 81'		Appiah 10'; Baggio 45' (pen.)	Stadium: Stadio Oreste Granillo

20 October 2002 5	Bologna	3–0	Brescia	Bologna
15:00	Locatelli 19'; Cruz 76' (pen.), 90'			Stadium: Stadio Renato Dall'Ara

27 October 2002 6	Brescia	1–1	Como	Brescia
15:00	Baggio 82' (pen.)		Padalino 73'	Stadium: Stadio Mario Rigamonti

2 November 2002 7	Torino	0–2	Brescia	Turin
20:30			Tare 30'; Appiah 86'	Stadium: Stadio Delle Alpi

6 November 2002 8	Parma	4–3	Brescia	Parma
20:30	Ferrari 15'; Mutu 27'; Bonazzoli 53'; Gilardino 75'		Appiah 14'; Baggio 25' (pen.), 60'	Stadium: Stadio Ennio Tardini

10 November 2002 9	Brescia	0–2	Empoli	Brescia
15:00			Buscè 71'; Di Natale 90'	Stadium: Stadio Mario Rigamonti

17 November 2002 10	Atalanta	2–0	Brescia	Bergamo
15:00	Dabo 69'; Comandini 73'			Stadium: Stadio Atleti Azzurri d'Italia

24 November 2002 11	Brescia	1–1	Udinese	Brescia
15:00	Sensini 68' (o.g.)		Jørgensen 9'	Stadium: Stadio Mario Rigamonti

1 December 2002 12	Inter	4–0	Brescia	Milan
15:00	Vieri 3', 12', 58', 84'			Stadium: Stadio San Siro

8 December 2002 13	Brescia	2–0	Juventus	Brescia
15:00	Schopp 78'; Tare 83'			Stadium: Stadio Mario Rigamonti

15 December 2002 14	Brescia	3–1	Perugia	Brescia
15:00	Tare 23', 40'; Baggio 88' (pen.)		Miccoli 64'	Stadium: Stadio Mario Rigamonti

22 December 2002 15	Milan	0–0	Brescia	Milan
15:00				Stadium: Stadio San Siro

11 January 2003 16	Brescia	0–0	Lazio	Brescia
20:30				Stadium: Stadio Mario Rigamonti

19 January 2003 17	Modena	0–0	Brescia	Modena
15:00				Stadium: Stadio Alberto Braglia

26 January 2003 18	Brescia	1–1	Parma	Brescia
15:00	Baggio 39'		Bonera 32'	Stadium: Stadio Mario Rigamonti

1 February 2003 19	Piacenza	1–4	Brescia	Piacenza
18:00	Hübner 17'		Appiah 7'; Baggio 32'; Toni 47'; Tare 87'	Stadium: Stadio Leonardo Garilli

9 February 2003 20	Brescia	0–0	Chievo	Brescia
15:00				Stadium: Stadio Mario Rigamonti

15 February 2003 21	Roma	0–0	Brescia	Rome
20:30				Stadium: Stadio Olimpico

23 February 2003 22	Brescia	2–1	Reggina	Brescia
15:00	Baggio 60'; Petruzzi 86'		Di Michele 69'	Stadium: Stadio Mario Rigamonti

1 March 2003 23	Brescia	0–0	Bologna	Brescia
18:00				Stadium: Stadio Mario Rigamonti

9 March 2003 24	Como	1–1	Brescia	Como
15:00	Pecchia 53'		Toni 54'	Stadium: Stadio Giuseppe Sinigaglia

16 March 2003 25	Brescia	1–0	Torino	Brescia
15:00	Guardiola 59'			Stadium: Stadio Mario Rigamonti

23 March 2003 26	Empoli	0–0	Brescia	Empoli
15:00				Stadium: Stadio Carlo Castellani

6 April 2003 27	Brescia	3–0	Atalanta	Brescia
15:00	Appiah 30'; Baggio 45'; Petruzzi 85'			Stadium: Stadio Mario Rigamonti

13 April 2003 28	Udinese	0–0	Brescia	Udine
15:00				Stadium: Stadio Friuli

19 April 2003 29	Brescia	0–1	Inter	Brescia
15:00			Crespo 90'	Stadium: Stadio Mario Rigamonti

27 April 2003 30	Juventus	2–1	Brescia	Turin
15:00	Del Piero 9', 85'		Appiah 83'	Stadium: Stadio Delle Alpi

3 May 2003 31	Perugia	0–0	Brescia	Perugia
15:00				Stadium: Stadio Renato Curi

10 May 2003 32	Brescia	1–0	Milan	Brescia
15:00	Appiah 83'			Stadium: Stadio Mario Rigamonti

17 May 2003 33	Lazio	3–1	Brescia	Rome
15:00	Mihajlović 39' (pen.); César 45'; López 81'		Baggio 20'	Stadium: Stadio Olimpico

24 May 2003 34	Brescia	2–2	Modena	Brescia
15:00	Filippini 69'; Baggio 86'		Colucci 4'; Vignaroli 20'	Stadium: Stadio Mario Rigamonti

== Statistics ==
=== Players statistics ===
No.	Pos	Nat	Player	Total		2002-03 Serie A	
No.	Pos	Nat	Player	Apps	Goals	Apps	Goals
22	GK	(Italy) ITA	Matteo Sereni	23	-17	23	-17
2	DF	(Costa Rica) CRC	Gilberto Martínez	34	0	34	0
3	DF	(Italy) ITA	Dario Dainelli	24	0	24	0
5	DF	(Italy) ITA	Fabio Petruzzi	31	2	31	2
6	DF	(Croatia) CRO	Anthony Seric	30	1	28+2	1
11	MF	(Italy) ITA	Jonathan Bachini	18	1	17+1	1
4	MF	(Ghana) GHA	Stephen Appiah	31	7	31	7
18	MF	(Italy) ITA	Antonio Filippini	29	1	21+8	1
8	MF	(Brazil) BRA	Matuzalém	30	0	30	0
10	FW	(Italy) ITA	Roberto Baggio	32	12	32	12
21	FW	(Albania) ALB	Igli Tare	33	6	20+13	6
12	GK	(Italy) ITA	Davide Micillo	8	-11	7+1	-11
9	FW	(Italy) ITA	Luca Toni	16	2	15+1	2
28	MF	(Spain) ESP	Josep Guardiola	13	1	13	1
19	MF	(Austria) AUT	Markus Schopp	23	2	12+11	2
26	DF	(Italy) ITA	Marco Pisano	17	0	12+5	0
15	DF	(Brazil) BRA	Fábio Bilica	11	0	9+2	0
16	DF	(Paraguay) PAR	Víctor Hugo Mareco	11	0	4+7	0
17	MF	(Italy) ITA	Roberto Guana	10	0	3+7	0
14	DF	(Lithuania) LTU	Marius Stankevicius	6	0	3+3	0
7	FW	(Morocco) MAR	Abderrazzak Jadid	9	0	1+8	0
1	GK	(Czech Republic) CZE	Pavel Srnicek	5	-10	1+4	-10
29	FW	(Italy) ITA	Andrea Alberti	3	0	0+3	0
23	FW	(Uruguay) URU	Alejandro Correa	1	0	0+1	0
24	FW	(Italy) ITA	Simone Del Nero	3	0	0+3	0
27	FW	(Italy) ITA	Caputo	1	0	0+1	0

- Source: http://calcio-seriea.net/presenze/2002/1227/
