= 2001–02 Brescia Calcio season =

Brescia Calcio
2001–02 season
- Manager: Carlo Mazzone
- Stadium: Stadio Mario Rigamonti
- Serie A: 13th
- Coppa Italia: Semifinals
- Top goalscorer: Luca Toni (13)
- Average home league attendance: 15,165
Home colours	Away colours

During the 2001–02 Italian football season, Brescia Calcio competed in the Serie A.

== Season summary ==
Brescia Calcio finished the season in 13th position in the Serie A table. In other competitions, Brescia reached the semifinals of the Coppa Italia.

Luca Toni was the top scorer for Brescia with 13 goals in all competitions.

== Squad ==
Note: Flags indicate national team as defined under FIFA eligibility rules; some limited exceptions apply. Players may hold more than one non-FIFA nationality.

No.	Pos.	Nation	Player
1	GK	ITA	Luca Castellazzi
2	DF	ITA	Aimo Diana
3	DF	ITA	Daniele Bonera
4	DF	ITA	Fabio Petruzzi
5	DF	ITA	Alessandro Calori
6	MF	POL	Marek Koźmiński
7	MF	ITA	Massimiliano Esposito
8	MF	ITA	Federico Giunti
9	FW	ITA	Luca Toni
10	FW	ITA	Roberto Baggio
11	FW	ALB	Igli Tare
12	GK	CZE	Pavel Srníček
13	DF	ITA	Vittorio Mero
14	DF	ITA	Dario Dainelli
15	MF	ARG	Andrés Yllana
16	GK	ITA	Federico Agliardi

No.	Pos.	Nation	Player
17	MF	ITA	Emanuele Filippini
18	MF	ITA	Antonio Filippini
19	MF	AUT	Markus Schopp
20	MF	ITA	Andrea Sussi
21	MF	ITA	Jonathan Bachini
22	MF	ITA	Roberto Guana
23	MF	ITA	Jonathan Binotto
23	MF	URU	Alejandro Correa
24	DF	ITA	Amedeo Mangone
25	FW	CHI	Mario Antonio Salgado
26	MF	ITA	Roberto Cortellini
28	MF	ESP	Pep Guardiola
29	FW	ITA	Andrea Caracciolo
30	DF	LTU	Marius Stankevičius
31	GK	ITA	Mauro Bacchin

=== Transfers ===
In
Pos.	Name	from	Type
MF	Josep Guardiola	FC Barcelona	
MF	Federico Giunti	AC Milan	
FW	Luca Toni	Vicenza	
FW	Igli Tare	1.FC Kaiserslautern	
MF	Markus Schopp	Sturm Graz	
DF	Andrea Sussi	Genoa CFC	
MF	Jonathan Bachini	Parma	loan
DF	Mario Salgado	Huachipato	

Out
Pos.	Name	To	Type
FW	Dario Hübner	Piacenza	
MF	Andrea Pirlo	AC Milan	loan ended
DF	Filippo Galli	Watford FC	
DF	Aimo Diana	Parma	loan
DF	Marek Koźmiński	Ancona	
DF	Alessio Baresi	Mestre	
MF	Pierpaolo Bisoli	Pistoiese	
MF	Simone Del Nero	Livingston	loan

==== Winter ====
In
Pos.	Name	from	Type
FW	Andrea Caracciolo	Como	
DF	Amedeo Mangone	Parma	loan
DF	Marius Stankevičius	Ekranas	
MF	Jonathan Binotto	Chievo Verona	

Out
Pos.	Name	To	Type
DF	Dario Dainelli	Hellas Verona	
MF	Alejandro Correa	Fermana	
MF	Massimiliano Esposito	Chievo Verona	
MF	Graziano Beltrami	Montichiari	
FW	Raúl Alberto González	Crotone	

== Competitions ==
=== League table ===
Pos	Team	Pld	W	D	L	GF	GA	GD	Pts	Qualification or relegation
11	Torino (Note: Torino gained entry to the 2002 UEFA Intertoto Cup after Atalanta declined to take part.)	34	10	13	11	37	39	−2	43	Qualification to Intertoto Cup second round
12	Piacenza	34	11	9	14	49	43	+6	42	
13	Brescia	34	9	13	12	43	52	−9	40 (Note: Brescia finished ahead of Udinese on head-to-head goal difference: Brescia 2–0 Udinese, Udinese 3–2 Brescia.)	
14	Udinese	34	11	7	16	41	52	−11	40	
15	Hellas Verona (R)	34	11	6	17	41	53	−12	39	Relegation to Serie B

Source: 2001–02 Serie A, Soccerway
Rules for classification: 1) Points; 2) Head-to-head points; 3) Head-to-head goal difference; 4) Goal difference; 5) Goals scored; 6) Draw. (Note: Head-to-head record is used only after all the matches between the teams in question have been played).
(R) Relegated

==== Results by round ====
Round	1	2	3	4	5	6	7	8	9	10	11	12	13	14	15	16	17	18	19	20	21	22	23	24	25	26	27	28	29	30	31	32	33	34
Ground	H	A	H	A	H	H	A	H	A	A	H	A	H	A	A	H	A	A	H	A	H	A	H	A	H	A	H	H	A	H	A	H	A	H
Result	D	W	D	L	D	D	W	W	L	D	W	L	L	L	D	L	L	D	L	W	L	D	D	D	D	W	D	W	L	D	L	W	L	W
Position	5	3	6	7	9	10	8	6	7	8	5	9	10	11	11	12	12	14	14	13	15	15	15	15	15	15	15	13	14	14	14	14	15	13

Source: Competitive matches
A = Away; H = Home; W = Win; D = Draw; L = Loss; = Leader, 2002–03 UEFA Champions League Group stage; = 2002–03 UEFA Cup First round; = 2002–03 UEFA Cup First round; = 2002 UEFA Intertoto Cup Third round; = 2002 UEFA Intertoto Cup Third round; = 2002 UEFA Intertoto Cup Second round; = 2002-03 Serie B

==== Matches ====
26 August 2001 1	Brescia	2–2	A.C. Milan	Brescia
	Tare 37', 41'	Report	49' Brocchi; 63' (pen.) Ševčenko	Stadium: Mario Rigamonti; Attendance: 18,827; Referee: Collina

9 September 2001 2	Torino	1–3	Brescia	Turin
	Lucarelli 30'	Report	9', 67' Tare; 88' (pen.) Baggio	Stadium: Stadio delle Alpi; Attendance: 18,586; Referee: Pasquale Rodomonti

16 September 2001 3	Brescia	1–1	Lecce	Brescia
	Baggio 93'	Report	12' Chevanton	Stadium: Mario Rigamonti; Attendance: 13,031; Referee: Saccani

23 September 2001 4	Parma F.C.	1–0	Brescia	Parma
	Nakata 87'	Report		Stadium: Stadio Ennio Tardini; Attendance: 16,369; Referee: Alfredo Trentalange

30 September 2001 5	Brescia	3–3	Atalanta B.C.	Brescia
	Baggio 24', 75', 92'	Report	27' Sala; 30' Doni; 45' Comandini	Stadium: Mario Rigamonti; Attendance: 14,423; Referee: Collina

14 October 2001 7	Brescia	2–2	Chievo Verona	Brescia
	Baggio 60' (pen.); Sussi 83'	Report	10' Marazzina; 77' Cossato	Stadium: Mario Rigamonti; Attendance: 15,447; Referee: Tombolini

21 October 2001 8	Piacenza Calcio	0–1	Brescia	Piacenza
		Report	19' Baggio '55 Baggio	Stadium: Stadio Leonardo Garilli; Attendance: 9,118; Referee: Graziano Cesari

28 October 2001 9	Brescia	3–2	Venezia F.C.	Brescia
	Baggio 50' (pen.); Baggio '53; Toni 63', 79'	Report	55' Magallanes; 89' (pen.) Maniero	Stadium: Mario Rigamonti; Attendance: 14,572; Referee: Pieri

4 November 2001 10	S.S. Lazio	5–0	Brescia	Rome
	Crespo 6', 32', 77'; Inzaghi 39'; Stankovic 62'	Report		Stadium: Olimpico; Attendance: 35,891; Referee: Trentalange

18 November 2001 11	Perugia Calcio	1–1	Brescia	Perugia
	Zé Maria 19' (pen.)	Report	7' Toni	Stadium: Stadio Renato Curi; Attendance: 6,469; Referee: Collina

25 November 2001 12	Brescia	2–0	Udinese Calcio	Brescia
	Giunti 15'; Filippini A. 29'	Report		Stadium: Mario Rigamonti; Attendance: 12,836; Referee: Pellegrino

2 December 2001 13	Hellas Verona	2–0	Brescia	Verona
	Frick 19', 46'	Report		Stadium: Stadio Marcantonio Bentegodi; Attendance: 15,320; Referee: Rodomonti

9 December 2001 14	Brescia	1–3	Inter	Brescia
	Tare 20'	Report	18' Ronaldo; 63', 78' Vieri	Stadium: Mario Rigamonti; Attendance: 19,500; Referee: Rodomonti

16 December 2001 15	Fiorentina	1–0	Brescia	Florence
	Ganz 92'	Report		Stadium: Stadio Artemio Franchi; Attendance: 14,197; Referee: Pieri

19 December 2001 6	Roma	0–0	Brescia	Rome
		Report		Stadium: Stadio Olimpico; Attendance: 51,228; Referee: Tombolini

23 December 2001 16	Brescia	0–4	Juventus	Brescia
		Report	30' Trezeguet; 41' Del Piero; 56' Ferrara; 70' Davids	Stadium: Mario Rigamonti; Attendance: 18,086; Referee: De Santis

6 January 2002 17	Bologna F.C.	2–1	Brescia	Bologna
	Petruzzi 10' (o.g.); Nervo 29'	Report	43' Toni	Stadium: Stadio Renato Dall'Ara; Attendance: 17,623; Referee: Palmieri

13 January 2002 18	A.C. Milan	0–0	Brescia	Milan
		Report		Stadium: San Siro; Attendance: 52,233; Referee: Borriello

19 January 2002 19	Brescia	1–2	Torino	Brescia
	Yllana 52'	Report	82' Ferrante; 87' Vergassola	Stadium: Mario Rigamonti; Attendance: 13,060; Referee: Pellegrino

27 January 2002 20	Lecce	1–3	Brescia	Lecce
	Chevanton 27'	Report	6', 65' Toni; 89' E. Filippini	Stadium: Via del Mare; Attendance: 12,653; Referee: Marco Gabriele

3 February 2002 21	Brescia	1–4	Parma F.C.	Brescia
	Toni 68'	Report	4' Micoud; 7' Şükür; 19', 94' Di Vaio	Stadium: Mario Rigamonti; Attendance: 12,330; Referee: Gianluca Paparesta

10 February 2002 22	Atalanta B.C.	0–0	Brescia	Bergamo
		Report		Stadium: Atleti Azzurri d'Italia; Attendance: 18,807; Referee: Gennaro Borriello

17 February 2002 23	Brescia	0–0	A.S. Roma	Brescia
		Report		Stadium: Mario Rigamonti; Attendance: 13,629; Referee: Paolo Bertini

24 February 2002 24	Chievo Verona	1–1	Brescia	Verona
	Corradi 34'	Report	81' Toni	Stadium: Marcantonio Bentegodi; Attendance: 9,755; Referee: Emilio Pellegrino

3 March 2002 25	Brescia	2–2	Piacenza Calcio	Brescia
	Caracciolo 59', 72'	Report	62' Sommese; 69' Hubner	Stadium: Mario Rigamonti; Attendance: 13,091; Referee: Borriello

10 March 2002 26	Venezia F.C.	1–2	Brescia	Venice
	Magallanes 41'	Report	55' (pen.) Giunti; 58' Salgado	Stadium: Stadio Pier Luigi Penzo; Attendance: 14,572; Referee: Trentalange

17 March 2002 27	Brescia	1–1	S.S. Lazio	Brescia
	Yllana 90' (pen.)	Report	56' Crespo	Stadium: Mario Rigamonti; Attendance: 14,064; Referee: Fiorenzo Treossi

24 March 2002 28	Brescia	3–0	Perugia Calcio	Brescia
	Toni 10'; Toni 28'; Toni 44'	Report		Stadium: Mario Rigamonti; Attendance: 14,764; Referee: Daniele Tombolini

30 March 2002 29	Udinese Calcio	3–2	Brescia	Udine
	Marcos Paulo 9'; Sosa 14', 47'	Report	17' Bachini; 90' Guardiola	Stadium: Friuli; Attendance: 16,516; Referee: Stefano Braschi

7 April 2002 30	Brescia	0–0	Hellas Verona	Brescia
		Report		Stadium: Mario Rigamonti; Attendance: 14,989; Referee: Fiorenzo Treossi

14 April 2002 31	Inter	2–1	Brescia	Milan
	Ronaldo 79'; Ronaldo 83'	Report	29' (pen.) Guardiola	Stadium: Giuseppe Meazza; Attendance: 69,161; Referee: Roberto Rosetti

21 April 2002 32	Brescia	3–0	Fiorentina	Brescia
	Toni 36'; Baggio 73', 87'	Report		Stadium: Mario Rigamonti; Attendance: 15,013; Referee: Marco Gabriele

28 April 2002 33	Juventus	5–0	Brescia	Turin
	Trezeguet 8', 76', 89'; Del Piero 71', 80'	Report		Stadium: Delle Alpi; Attendance: 49,763; Referee: Racalbuto

5 May 2002 34	Brescia	3–0	Bologna F.C.	Brescia
	Bachini 48'; Baggio 65'; Baggio (penalty missed) '73; Toni 88'	Report		Stadium: Mario Rigamonti; Attendance: 20,144; Referee: Collina

=== Coppa Italia ===
==== Semifinals ====
31 January 2002	Parma F.C.	2–0	Brescia	Parma
	Nakata 55'; Marchionni 62'	Report	'59 Baggio	Stadium: Il Tardini; Attendance: 5,000; Referee: Graziano Cesari

7 February 2002	Brescia	2–1	Parma F.C.	Brescia
	Giunti 68' (pen.); Salgado 72'	Report	49' Bonazzoli	Stadium: Mario Rigamonti; Attendance: 3,500; Referee: Massimiliano Saccani

=== UEFA Intertoto Cup ===
==== Finals ====
7 August 2001 1	Paris Saint-Germain (France)	0–0	Brescia	Paris
20:30		Report		Stadium: Parc des Princes; Attendance: 35,000; Referee: Mike McCurry (Scotland)

21 August 2001	Brescia	1–1 (1–1 a agg.)	(France) Paris Saint-Germain	Brescia
20:15	Baggio 79' (pen.)	Report	Aloísio 74'	Stadium: Stadio Mario Rigamonti; Attendance: 23,000; Referee: Juan A. Fernández (Spain)

== Statistics ==
=== Players statistics ===
No.	Pos	Nat	Player	Total		2001-02 Serie A		2001-02 Coppa Italia		2001 UEFA Intertoto Cup	
No.	Pos	Nat	Player	Apps	Goals	Apps	Goals	Apps	Goals	Apps	Goals
1	GK	(Italy) ITA	Castellazzi	34	-51	34	-51				
5	DF	(Italy) ITA	Calori	32	0	28+4	0				
3	DF	(Italy) ITA	Bonera	29	0	29	0				
4	DF	(Italy) ITA	Petruzzi	29	-1	29	-1				
20	DF	(Italy) ITA	Sussi	30	1	26+4	1				
17	MF	(Italy) ITA	E. Filippini	29	1	25+4	1				
28	MF	(Spain) ESP	Guardiola	11	2	11	2				
8	MF	(Italy) ITA	Giunti	27	2	26+1	2				
18	MF	(Italy) ITA	A. Filippini	32	1	30+2	1				
9	FW	(Italy) ITA	Toni	28	13	26+2	13				
10	FW	(Italy) ITA	Baggio	12	11	10+2	11				
12	GK	(Czech Republic) CZE	Srníček	1	1	0+1	1				
24	DF	(Italy) ITA	Mangone	17	0	17	0				
11	FW	(Albania) ALB	Tare	25	2	16+9	2				
15	MF	(Argentina) ARG	Yllana	25	2	11+14	2				
19	MF	(Austria) AUT	Schopp	20	0	10+10	0				
7	MF	(Italy) ITA	Esposito	15	0	8+7	0				
22	MF	(Italy) ITA	Guana	13	0	6+7	0				
23	MF	(Italy) ITA	Binotto	11	0	4+7	0				
25	FW	(Chile) CHI	Salgado	10	1	3+7	1				
6	MF	(Poland) POL	Kozminski	5	0	3+2					
21	MF	(Italy) ITA	Bachini	9	2	2+7	2				
13	DF	(Italy) ITA	Mero	8	0	2+6	0				
29	FW	(Italy) ITA	Caracciolo	7	2	2+5	2				
30	DF	(Lithuania) LTU	Stankevičius	2	0	1+1	0				
14	DF	(Italy) ITA	Dainelli	5	0	1+4	0				
2	DF	(Italy) ITA	Diana	2	0	0+2	0				
16	GK	(Italy) ITA	Agliardi	0	0	0	0				
23	MF	(Uruguay) URU	Alejandro Correa	2	0	0+2	0				
26	MF	(Italy) ITA	Roberto Cortellini	0	0	0	0				
31	GK	(Italy) ITA	Mauro Bacchin	0	0	0	0				
