= 2000–01 Brescia Calcio season =

Brescia Calcio
2000-2001 season
- President: Luigi Corioni
- Manager: Carlo Mazzone
- Stadium: Mario Rigamonti
- Serie A: 8th (in Intertoto Cup)
- Coppa Italia: Quarterfinals
- Top goalscorer: League: Hübner (17); All: Hübner (24)
- Highest home attendance: 21,845 vs Inter (29 April 2001)
- Lowest home attendance: 13,189 vs U.S. Lecce (23 December 2000)
Home colours	Away colours

During the 2000–01 season Brescia Calcio competed in Serie A and Coppa Italia.

== Summary ==
The club disputed its 17th campaign in Serie A after suffered relegation in 1997-98 Serie A season, finishing this time on a decent 8th spot, its best ever in the history of the franchise and clinches the classification to 2001 UEFA Intertoto Cup.

The team reaches the Coppa Italia Quarterfinals stage defeating Alzano Virescit, Brescello and Treviso in the first round, Vicenza in Second round and Juventus in Eightfinals, being eliminated by future Champion of the tournament Fiorentina. The season is best remembered by the transfer of 1993 European Footballer of the Year Roberto Baggio from Inter scoring 10 goals in League, and the loan in of young midfielder Andrea Pirlo which Mazzone deploys as Deep- lying playmaker resulting in his career breakthrough. Forward Dario Hübner scored 24 goals prompting his transfer out to Piacenza Calcio at the end of the season.

== Squad ==
Note: Flags indicate national team as defined under FIFA eligibility rules; some limited exceptions apply. Players may hold more than one non-FIFA nationality.

No.	Pos.	Nation	Player
1	GK	CZE	Pavel Srníček
2	DF	ITA	Aimo Diana
3	DF	POL	Marek Koźmiński
4	DF	ITA	Fabio Petruzzi
5	MF	ITA	Andrea Pirlo
6	DF	ITA	Alessandro Calori
7	MF	ITA	Pierluigi Orlandini
8	MF	ITA	Pierpaolo Bisoli
10	FW	ITA	Roberto Baggio
11	FW	ITA	Dario Hübner

No.	Pos.	Nation	Player
12	GK	ITA	Luca Castellazzi
13	DF	ITA	Daniele Bonera
14	MF	ARG	Andrés Yllana
15	MF	URU	Alejandro Correa
16	FW	ARG	Raúl Alberto González
17	MF	ITA	Emanuele Filippini
18	MF	ITA	Antonio Filippini
20	FW	ITA	Francesco Marino
21	DF	ITA	Filippo Galli
25	FW	ITA	Simone Del Nero
26	MF	ITA	Jonathan Bachini
27	FW	ALB	Igli Tare
31	FW	ITA	Massimiliano Esposito
32	MF	ITA	Roberto Guana

=== Transfers ===
In
Pos.	Name	from	Type
FW	Roberto Baggio	Inter	released
GK	Pavel Srnicek	Sheffield Wednesday	
DF	Fabio Petruzzi	A.S. Roma	
DF	Alessandro Calori	Perugia Calcio	
MF	Pierpaolo Bisoli	Perugia Calcio	
MF	Massimiliano Esposito	Perugia Calcio	
MF	Pierluigi Orlandini	A.C. Milan	
FW	Alejandro Correa	Club Deportivo Maldonado	
MF	Raul Alberto Gonzalez	Atlético Rafaela	
FW	Francesco Marino	U.S. Lecce	
MF	Simone Del Nero	Empoli F.C.	

Out
Pos.	Name	To	Type
FW	Florin Raducioiu	Dinamo Bucuresti	
GK	Gilbert Bodart	Ravenna F.C.	
DF	Francesco Zanoncelli	Genoa Cricket and Football Club	
MF	Tal Banin	Maccabi Tel Aviv F.C.	
MF	Carmine Nunziata	A.S. Montechiari	
FW	Raffaele Cerbone	Chievo Verona	loan ended
FW	Massimiliano Caputo	Ascoli Calcio 1898 FC	
FW	Emiliano Bonazzoli	Parma F.C.	
MF	Ivan Javorcic	Crotone	
DF	Carlos Aurellio	Cosenza Calcio	

==== Winter ====
In
Pos.	Name	from	Type
AM	Andrea Pirlo	Inter	loan
DF	Jonathan Bachini	Juventus	loan
FW	Igli Tare	1. FC Kaiserslautern	

Out
Pos.	Name	To	Type
FW	Kubilay Türkyilmaz	FC Lugano	
MF	Ivan Javorcic	Treviso F.B.C. 1993	

== Competitions ==
=== League table ===
Pos	Team	Pld	W	D	L	GF	GA	GD	Pts	Qualification or relegation
6	Milan	34	12	13	9	56	46	+10	49	Qualification to UEFA Cup first round
7	Atalanta	34	10	14	10	38	34	+4	44 (Note: Atalanta finished ahead of Brescia on head-to-head points: Atalanta 2–0 Brescia, Brescia 0–3 Atalanta.)	
8	Brescia (Note: Brescia gained entry to the 2001 UEFA Intertoto Cup after Atalanta declined.)	34	10	14	10	44	42	+2	44	Qualification to Intertoto Cup third round
9	Fiorentina (Note: Fiorentina gained entry to the 2001–02 UEFA Cup as the 2000–01 Coppa Italia champions.)	34	10	13	11	53	52	+1	43	Qualification to UEFA Cup first round
10	Bologna	34	11	10	13	49	53	−4	43	

Source: 2000–01 Serie A, Soccerway, RSSSF.com
Rules for classification: 1) Points; 2) Head-to-head points; 3) Head-to-head goal difference; 4) Goal difference; 5) Goals scored; 6) Draw. (Note: Head-to-head record is used only after all the matches between the teams in question have been played).

==== Results by round ====
Round	1	2	3	4	5	6	7	8	9	10	11	12	13	14	15	16	17	18	19	20	21	22	23	24	25	26	27	28	29	30	31	32	33	34
Ground	A	H	H	A	H	A	H	A	A	H	A	H	A	H	A	H	A	H	A	A	H	A	H	A	H	H	A	H	A	H	A	H	A	H
Result	L	D	D	L	L	L	D	W	L	D	D	D	L	W	D	D	W	W	L	D	L	L	L	D	W	W	D	W	W	D	D	W	D	W
Position	14	13	14	16	16	16	15	15	15	16	16	16	17	17	16	15	13	13	13	13	13	14	16	16	13	13	13	11	11	11	11	11	11	8

Source: Competitive matches
A = Away; H = Home; W = Win; D = Draw; L = Loss; = Leader, 2001–02 UEFA Champions League Group stage; = 2001 UEFA Intertoto Cup Third round; = 2001-02 Serie B; = 2001-02 Serie B; = 2001-02 Serie B; = 2001-02 Serie B

==== Matches ====
1 October 2000 1	Udinese Calcio	4–2	Brescia	Udine
	Sosa 2'; Iaquinta 59'; Gargo 82'; Muzzi 84'	Report	65' Bisoli; 81' Diana	Stadium: Friuli; Attendance: 17,424; Referee: Massimiliano Saccani

15 October 2000 2	Brescia	0–0	Parma F.C.	Brescia
		Report		Stadium: Mario Rigamonti; Attendance: 13,291; Referee: Danilo Nucini

22 October 2000 3	Brescia	1–1	Fiorentina	Brescia
	Hübner 50'	Report	70' Leandro	Stadium: Mario Rigamonti; Attendance: 16,208; Referee: Pasquale Rodomonti

1 November 2000 4	S.S. Lazio	2–1	Brescia	Rome
	Inzaghi 34' (pen.); Inzaghi 79'	Report	3' (pen.) Hübner	Stadium: Olimpico; Attendance: 42,843; Referee: Stefano Farina

5 November 2000 5	Brescia	2–4	A.S. Roma	Brescia
	Bisoli 22'; Hübner 45' (pen.)	Report	12' Candela; 60' Batistuta; 78' Batistuta; 90' Batistuta	Stadium: Mario Rigamonti; Attendance: 16,619; Referee: Salvatore Racalbuto

11 November 2000 6	Atalanta B.C.	2–0	Brescia	Bergamo
	Donati 16'; Ventola 90'	Report		Stadium: Stadio Atleti Azzurri d'Italia; Attendance: 21,255; Referee: Graziano Cesari

19 November 2000 7	Brescia	0–0	Juventus	Brescia
		Report		Stadium: Mario Rigamonti; Attendance: 19,353; Referee: Stefano Farina

26 November 2000 8	Reggina Calcio	0–3	Brescia	Reggio Calabria
		Report	2' Marino; 70' Calori; 83' Esposito	Stadium: Oreste Granillo; Attendance: 23,964; Referee: Collina
Note:

3 December 2000 9	Hellas Verona	2–1	Brescia	Verona
	Bonazzoli 6'; Gilardino 85'	Report	90' Hübner	Stadium: Marcantonio Bentegodi; Attendance: 13,863; Referee: Massimiliano Saccani

9 December 2000 10	Brescia	1–1	S.S.C. Napoli	Brescia
	Diana 31'	Report	57' Pecchia	Stadium: Mario Rigamonti; Attendance: 15,030; Referee: Cosimo Bolognino

17 December 2000 11	Inter	0–0	Brescia	Milan
		Report		Stadium: Giuseppe Meazza; Attendance: 49,580; Referee: Paolo Bertini

23 December 2000 12	Brescia	2–2	U.S. Lecce	Brescia
	Hübner 68'; Hübner 77' (pen.)	Report	19' Lucarelli; 51' Lucarelli	Stadium: Mario Rigamonti; Attendance: 13,189; Referee: Alberto Castellani

7 January 2001 13	Bologna F.C.	1–0	Brescia	Bologna
	Locatelli 33'	Report		Stadium: Renato Dall'Ara; Attendance: 22,029; Referee: Rossi

13 January 2001 14	Brescia	1–0	Perugia Calcio	Brescia
	Yllana 20'	Report		Stadium: Mario Rigamonti; Attendance: 12,685; Referee: Gennaro Borriello

21 January 2001 15	Vicenza Calcio	1–1	Brescia	Vicenza
	Calori 48' (o.g.)	Report	3' Hübner	Stadium: Romeo Menti; Attendance: 14,409; Referee: Pasquale Rodomonti

28 January 2001 16	Brescia	1–1	A.C. Milan	Brescia
	Hübner 48'	Report	27' Bierhoff	Stadium: Mario Rigamonti; Attendance: 20,819; Referee: Stefano Farina

4 February 2001 17	Bari	1–3	Brescia	Bari
	Neqrouz 65'	Report	37' Tare; 73' Hübner; 86' Hübner	Stadium: San Nicola; Attendance: 10,203; Referee: Cosimo Bolognino

11 February 2001 18	Brescia	3–1	Udinese Calcio	Brescia
	Hübner 53' (pen.); Hübner 68'; Hübner 79'	Report	84' Margiotta	Stadium: Mario Rigamonti; Attendance: 14,861; Referee: Stefano Cassarà

18 February 2001 19	Parma F.C.	3–0	Brescia	Parma
	Mboma 55'; Conceição 67'; Júnior 78'	Report		Stadium: Il Tardini; Attendance: 18,555; Referee: Gennaro Borriello

24 February 2001 20	Fiorentina	2–2	Brescia	Florence
	Chiesa 23'; Gomes 62'	Report	4' Baggio; 66' Baggio	Stadium: Artemio Franchi; Attendance: 25,720; Referee: Fiorenzo Treossi

4 March 2001 21	Brescia	0–1	S.S. Lazio	Brescia
		Report	59' Salas	Stadium: Mario Rigamonti; Attendance: 15,025; Referee: Gianluca Paparesta

11 March 2001 22	A.S. Roma	3–1	Brescia	Rome
	Assunção 21'; Montella 69', 89'	Report	30' Yllana	Stadium: Olimpico; Attendance: 60,586

19 March 2001 23	Brescia	0–3	Atalanta B.C.	Reggio Emilia
		Report	11', 63' Ganz; 44' Morfeo	Stadium: Giglio; Attendance: 6,000; Referee: Stefano Braschi

1 April 2001 24	Juventus	1–1	Brescia	Turin
	Zambrotta 30'	Report	86' Baggio	Stadium: Delle Alpi; Attendance: 38,089; Referee: Gennaro Borriello

8 April 2001 25	Brescia	4–0	Reggina Calcio	Brescia
	A. Filippini 33'; Petruzzi 48'; Baggio 73' (rig); Tare 90'	Report		Stadium: Mario Rigamonti; Attendance: 14,860; Referee: Graziano Cesari

14 April 2001 26	Brescia	1–0	Hellas Verona	Brescia
	Baggio I 22'	Report		Stadium: Mario Rigamonti; Attendance: 15,655; Referee: Collina

21 April 2001 27	S.S.C. Napoli	1–1	Brescia	Naples
	Amoruso 47' (pen.)	Report	92' Baggio	Stadium: San Paolo; Attendance: 41,355; Referee: Pasquale Rodomonti

29 April 2001 28	Brescia	1–0	Inter	Brescia
	Baggio 12' (pen.)	Report		Stadium: Mario Rigamonti; Attendance: 21,845; Referee: Massimo De Santis

5 May 2001 29	U.S. Lecce	0–3	Brescia	Lecce
		Report	5' Baggio; 59' Baggio; 79' (pen.) Baggio	Stadium: Via del Mare; Attendance: 18,708; Referee: Alberto Castellani

13 May 2001 30	Brescia	0–0	Bologna F.C.	Brescia
		Report		Stadium: Mario Rigamonti; Attendance: 17,392; Referee: Stefano Cassarà

20 May 2001 31	Perugia	2–2	Brescia	Perugia
	Vryzas 59'; Robbiati 87'	Report	45' Hübner; 58' (pen.) Hübner	Stadium: Renato Curi; Attendance: 8,357; Referee: Roberto Rosetti

27 May 2001 32	Brescia	2–1	Vicenza Calcio	Brescia
	Hübner 10' (pen.); Bachini 44'	Report	87' Comotto	Stadium: Mario Rigamonti; Attendance: 19,520; Referee: Danilo Nucini

10 June 2001 33	A.C. Milan	1–1	Brescia	Milan
	José Mari 67'	Report	69' Bachini	Stadium: Giuseppe Meazza; Attendance: 56,283; Referee: Roberto Rosetti

17 June 2001 34	Brescia	3–1	Bari	Brescia
	Tare 12', 36'; Hübner 65'	Report	10' Poggi	Stadium: Mario Rigamonti; Attendance: 16,486; Referee: Pasquale Rodomonti

=== Coppa Italia ===
==== First round ====
13 August 2000	Brescia	2–1	Treviso	Brescia
	Hübner 47'			Stadium: Mario Rigamonti; Referee: Angelo Bonfrisco

17 August 2000	Brescello	0–1	Brescia	Reggio Emilia
			60' (pen.) Hübner	Stadium: Giglio; Referee: Alberto Castellani

20 August 2000	Brescia	1–2	Alzano Virescit	Brescia
	Hübner 75' (pen.)		22' Sala; 30' Grossi	Stadium: Mario Rigamonti; Referee: Fausti

==== Second round ====
26 August 2000 1	Brescia	2–1	Vicenza	Brescia
	Hübner 40'; Orlandini 77' (pen.)		90' Bernardini	Stadium: Mario Rigamonti; Referee: Daniele Tombolini

6 September 2000 2	Vicenza Calcio	2–1 (a.e.t.) (4–5 p)	Brescia	Vicenza
	Cardone 11'; Luiso 30' (pen.)		66' (pen.) Hübner	Referee: Fiorenzo Treossi
	Penalties
	Longo (penalty scored); Zauli (penalty missed); Cardone (penalty scored); Fattori (penalty scored); Luiso (penalty scored); Crovari (penalty missed)		(penalty scored) E. Filippini; (penalty scored) Koźmiński; (penalty scored) Türkyılmaz; (penalty missed) Calori; (penalty scored) Hübner; (penalty scored) Diana

==== Eightfinals ====
16 September 2000 1	Brescia	0–0	Juventus	Brescia
				Stadium: Mario Rigamonti; Referee: Stefano Braschi

23 September 2000 2	Juventus	1–2	Brescia	Turin
	Conte 22'		47' Hübner; 73' Hübner	Stadium: Delle Alpi; Referee: Fiorenzo Treossi

==== Quarterfinals ====
29 November 2000 1	Fiorentina	6–0	Brescia	Florence
	Leandro 28'; Bressan 35'; Chiesa 39'; Chiesa 57'; Leandro 64'; Rui Costa 72'			Stadium: Artemio Franchi; Referee: Emilio Pellegrino

13 December 2000 2	Brescia	3–1	Fiorentina	Brescia
	Yllana 45'; Orlandini 70' (rig); Correa 82'		53' Leandro	Stadium: Mario Rigamonti; Referee: Zaltron

== Statistics ==
=== Squad statistics ===
Competition	Points	Home						Away						Total						GD
Competition	Points	G	W	D	L	Gs	Ga	G	W	D	L	Gs	Ga	G	W	D	L	Gs	Ga	GD
Serie A	44	17	7	7	3	22	16	17	3	7	7	22	26	34	10	14	10	44	42	+2
Coppa Italia		5	3	1	1	8	5	4	2	0	2	4	9	9	5	1	3	12	14	-2
Total		22	10	8	4	30	21	21	5	7	9	26	35	43	15	15	13	56	56	0

=== Players statistics ===
No.	Pos	Nat	Player	Total		2000-01 Serie A		2000-01 Coppa Italia	
No.	Pos	Nat	Player	Apps	Goals	Apps	Goals	Apps	Goals
1	GK	(Czech Republic) CZE	Srnicek	29	-30	26	-27	3	-3
6	DF	(Italy) ITA	Calori	39	1	31	1	8	0
2	DF	(Italy) ITA	Diana	39	2	32	2	7	0
13	DF	(Italy) ITA	Bonera	30	0	25+1	0	4	0
4	DF	(Italy) ITA	Petruzzi	35	1	28	1	7	0
8	MF	(Italy) ITA	Bisoli	39	2	24+8	2	7	0
18	MF	(Italy) ITA	A. Filippini	32	1	23+5	1	4	0
17	MF	(Italy) ITA	E. Filippini	34	0	23+5	0	6	0
26	MF	(Italy) ITA	Bachini	20	2	20	2		
11	FW	(Italy) ITA	Hübner	39	24	27+4	17	8	7
10	FW	(Italy) ITA	Baggio	28	10	25	10	3	0
12	GK	(Italy) ITA	Castellazzi	15	-25	8+1	-15	6	-10
14	MF	(Argentina) ARG	Yllana	24	2	18+4	2	2	0
21	DF	(Italy) ITA	Galli	26	0	17+6	0	3	0
31	MF	(Italy) ITA	Esposito	24	1	11+8	1	5	0
5	DM	(Italy) ITA	Pirlo	10	0	10	0		
3	MF	(Poland) POL	Kozminski	23	0	8+7	0	8	0
27	FW	(Albania) ALB	Tare	17	4	5+12	4		
20	FW	(Italy) ITA	Marino	16	1	5+6	1	5	0
9	FW	(Switzerland) SUI	Turkyilmaz	11	0	2+7	0	2	0
16	FW	(Argentina) ARG	Gonzalez	15	0	2+5	0	8	0
25	FW	(Italy) ITA	Del Nero	7	0	1+2	0	4	0
		(Italy) ITA	Bono	1	0	0	0	1	0
15	FW	(Uruguay) URU	Correa	7	0	0+4	0	3	0
5	MF	(Italy) ITA	Mero	10	0	1+1	0	8	0
32	DF	(Italy) ITA	Guana	5	0	0+4	0	1	0
7	MF	(Italy) ITA	Orlandini	11	1	0+4	0	7	1
23	MF	(Croatia) CRO	Javorcic	3	0	0	0	3	0
	FW	(Romania) ROU	Raducioiu	2	0	0	0	2	0
22	GK	(Italy) ITA	Agliardi	0	0	0	0	0	0

- Source: http://calcio-seriea.net/presenze/2000/1195/

== Bibliography ==
- Fabrizio Melegari (a cura di) (2001). Almanacco illustrato del calcio 2002 (in Italian). Modena, Panini.
- Marco Bencivenga, Ciro Corradini e Carlo Fontanelli (2007). "Tutto il Brescia 1911-2007, tremila volte in campo" (in Italian). Empoli (FI). Geo Edizioni S.r.l.
