= Yllana =

Yllana is a surname. Notable people with the surname include:

- Adolfo Tito Yllana (born 1948), Filipino archbishop and apostolic nuncio and since 2015 the Apostolic Nuncio to Australia
- Andrés Yllana (born 1974), Argentine football player
- Anjo Yllana (born 1968), Filipino actor-comedian, television host and politician
- Jomari Yllana (born 1976), Filipino actor, model, race car driver, and concert producer and promoter
