= Ryszard Staniek =

Polish footballer

Personal information
- Full name: Ryszard Staniek
- Date of birth: 13 March 1971 (age 55)
- Place of birth: Zebrzydowice, Poland
- Height: 1.89 m (6 ft 2 in)
- Position: Midfielder

Senior career*
Years	Team	Apps	(Gls)
1987–1988	Cukrownik Chybie		
1988–1990	Odra Wodzisław		
1990–1993	Górnik Zabrze	89	(16)
1993–1995	Osasuna	55	(3)
1995–1998	Legia Warsaw	91	(11)
1998–2000	Odra Wodzisław	28	(4)
2001	Odra Opole		
2001	Piast Gliwice		
2002	GKS Jastrzębie		
2002	Orzeł Zabłocie		
2002–2005	GKS Jastrzębie		
2005–2006	Beskid Skoczów		

International career
- Poland Olympic
1992–1996	Poland	12	(1)
Medal record
Representing Poland
Men's football
Olympic Games
Silver medal – second place	1992 Barcelona	Team
- * Club domestic league appearances and goals

Ryszard Staniek (born 13 March 1971) is a Polish former professional footballer who played as a midfielder.

== Career ==
=== Club ===
He played for such a clubs like Legia Warsaw, Górnik Zabrze, Odra Wodzisław Śląski and CA Osasuna. After scoring in a 3–1 win over Rosenborg on 13 September 1995, Staniek became the second player to scored for a Polish team in the group stage of UEFA Champions League.

=== National team ===
Staniek was a member of the Poland national team at the 1992 Summer Olympics, and scored a goal in the final against Spain.

== Honours ==
Legia Warsaw

- Polish Cup: 1996–97
- Polish Super Cup: 1997

Poland Olympic

- Olympic silver medal: 1992
