= Marcin Jałocha =

Polish footballer (born 1971)

Personal information
- Full name: Marcin Jałocha
- Date of birth: 17 March 1971 (age 55)
- Place of birth: Kraków, Poland
- Height: 1.78 m (5 ft 10 in)
- Position: Defender

Senior career*
| Years | Team | Apps | (Gls) |
| 1987–1992 | Wisła Kraków | 124 | (6) |
| 1993–1994 | Legia Warsaw | 45 | (6) |
| 1994–1995 | Waregem | 23 | (1) |
| 1995–1997 | Legia Warsaw | 41 | (2) |
| 1997–1999 | Polonia Warsaw | 42 | (1) |
| 1999–2001 | Ceramika Opoczno | 56 | (0) |
| 2001 | Hutnik Kraków | 17 | (0) |
| 2002–2003 | Proszowianka Proszowice | 12 | (0) |

International career
| | Poland Olympic | 34 | (0) |
| 1992–1994 | Poland | 18 | (1) |

Managerial career
- 2003–2005: Wisła Kraków (youth)
- 2005: Wisła Kraków II
- 2006: Wróblowianka Kraków
- 2006–2010: LKS Nieciecza
- 2011–2012: Resovia Rzeszów
- 2013–2014: Radomiak Radom
- 2014: Wisła Puławy
- 2016–2017: Kmita Zabierzów
- 2017–2019: Orzeł Piaski Wielkie
- 2020: Sandecja Nowy Sącz
- 2020–2021: Polonia Nysa
Medal record
Men's football
Representing Poland
Olympic Games
| Silver medal – second place | 1992 Barcelona | Team |
- * Club domestic league appearances and goals

Marcin Jałocha (born 17 March 1971) is a Polish professional football manager and former player.

== Playing career ==
=== National team ===
He represented his native country at the 1992 Summer Olympics in Barcelona. There he won the silver medal with the national squad.

Jałocha made 18 appearances for the Poland national football team, scoring one goal.

== Coaching career ==
He was the manager of Resovia Rzeszów.

== Career statistics ==
=== International ===
Scores and results list Poland's goal tally first, score column indicates score after each Jałocha goal.

List of international goals scored by Marcin Jałocha
| No. | Date | Venue | Opponent | Score | Result | Competition |
|---|---|---|---|---|---|---|
| 1 | 4 May 1994 | Wisła Stadium, Kraków, Poland | Hungary | 1–1 | 3–2 | Friendly |

== Personal life ==
His uncle Jan is a former football player and Polish international.

== Honours ==
=== Player ===
Legia Warsaw

- Ekstraklasa: 1993–94
- Polish Cup: 1993–94, 1996–97
- Polish Super Cup: 1994

Poland Olympic

- Olympic silver medal: 1992

=== Managerial ===
LKS Nieciecza

- II liga East: 2009–10
- V liga Nowy Sącz-Tarnów: 2006–07
