= Dariusz Gęsior =

Polish footballer (born 1969)

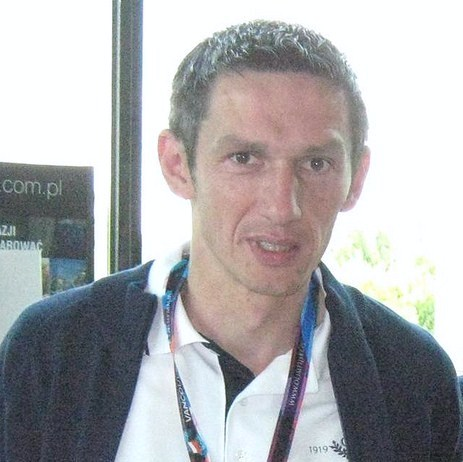
- Gęsior in 2007

Personal information
- Full name: Dariusz Jan Gęsior
- Date of birth: 9 October 1969 (age 57)
- Place of birth: Chorzów, Polish People’s Republic
- Height: 1.88 m (6 ft 2 in)
- Position: Defender

Team information
- Current team: Cracovia (youth development coach)

Senior career*
| Years | Team | Apps | (Gls) |
| 1987–1996 | Ruch Chorzów | 178 (Note: Doesn't include stats from the 1987–88 and 1995–96 seasons.) | (27) |
| 1997–2000 | Widzew Łódź | 103 | (18) |
| 2000–2001 | Pogoń Szczecin | 33 | (5) |
| 2001–2003 | Amica Wronki | 37 | (5) |
| 2003–2005 | Wisła Płock | 63 | (15) |
| 2006 | Dyskobolia Grodzisk | 13 | (3) |
| Total | | 427 | (73) |

International career
- Poland Olympic
| 1992–1999 | Poland | 22 | (1) |

Managerial career
- 2017–2018: Poland U20
- 2018–2019: Poland U19
- 2019–2020: Poland U16
- 2020–2021: Poland U16
- 2021–2022: Poland U17
- 2022–2023: Poland U15
- 2023–2024: Poland U16
- 2024–2025: Poland U17
- 2025–2026: Poland U15
Medal record
Representing Poland
Men's football
Olympic Games
| Silver medal – second place | 1992 Barcelona | Team |
- * Club domestic league appearances and goals

Dariusz Jan Gęsior (Polish pronunciation: [daˈrjuʂ ˈjan ˈɡɛ̃ɕɔr]; born 9 October 1969) is a Polish professional football manager and former player. He currently works for Ekstraklasa club Cracovia as a youth development & management coach.

== Club career ==
Gęsior is one of the most notable players of Ruch Chorzów. His last club was Dyskobolia Grodzisk Wielkopolski, which he left in late 2006. His nickname is Gąska.

== International career ==
Gęsior was a member of the Olympic national team participating in the 1992 Summer Olympics, where Poland won the silver medal. He played 22 caps and scored once for the Poland senior team.

== Honours ==
Ruch Chorzów

- Ekstraklasa: 1988–89
- Polish Cup: 1995–96

Widzew Łódź

- Ekstraklasa: 1996–97

Poland Olympic

- Olympic silver medal: 1992

Individual

- Polish Newcomer of the Year: 1989
