= Aleksander Kłak =

Polish footballer (born 1970)

Personal information
- Full name: Aleksander Dominik Kłak
- Date of birth: 24 November 1970 (age 55)
- Place of birth: Nowy Sącz, Polish People’s Republic
- Height: 1.86 m (6 ft 1 in)
- Position: Goalkeeper

Youth career
- Dunajec Nowy Sącz

Senior career*
Years	Team	Apps	(Gls)
1985–1992	Igloopol Dębica	32+	(0)
1993	Olimpia Poznań	15	(0)
1993–1995	Górnik Zabrze	37	(0)
1995	SV Straelen		
1995	FC Homburg		
1996	Bonner SC	11	(0)
1996–2002	Royal Antwerp	53	(0)
2002–2003	FC Denderleeuw		
2003–2005	De Graafschap	16	(0)

International career
- Poland Olympic
1992–1997	Poland	11	(0)

Managerial career
- Royal Antwerp (goalkeeping coach)
Medal record
Representing Poland
Men's football
Olympic Games
Silver medal – second place	1992 Barcelona	Team
- * Club domestic league appearances and goals

Aleksander Dominik Kłak (born 24 November 1970) is a Polish former professional footballer who played as a goalkeeper. Kłak was a participant at the 1992 Summer Olympics, where Poland won the silver medal.

After retiring from playing due to ongoing injury problems, he became a goalkeeping coach at Royal Antwerp and a bus driver for the Antwerp public transportation network.

He also battled clinical depression after retirement, and says his recovery was aided, among others, by the help of the Capucin monks and his subsequent rediscovery of his faith.

== Honours ==
Poland Olympic

- Olympic silver medal: 1992
