= Dunajec Nowy Sącz =

Polish football club

- Full name: Klub Sportowy Dunajec Nowy Sącz
- Founded: 24 March 1945; 80 years ago
- Ground: Higher Vocational State School grounds
- Capacity: 1,200
- Chairman: Tomasz Popiela
- Manager: Łukasz Biernacki
- League: V Liga Lesser Poland East
- 2024–25: V Liga Lesser Poland East, 4th of 16
- Website: http://www.ksdunajec.pl/index.php

Klub Sportowy Dunajec Nowy Sącz, commonly referred to as Dunajec Nowy Sącz, is a Polish football club based in Nowy Sącz. The club currently plays in the V liga.

== Achievements ==
The biggest success was the participation in the third division. Dunajec was represented by players such as Aleksander Klak, Piotr Świerczewski, Andrzej Dorula. Przemysław Szarek, Adrian Danek and Miłosz Szczepański. Dunajec operates a football academy run by former players, such as Tadeusz Kazała, Piotr Śmietana czy Krzysztof Szczepański. The biggest successes were captured by teams led by Śmietana, winning two Lesser Poland U19 titles.

== History ==
- 24 March 1945 - the founding meeting was held at the Workers' Sports Club "Świt". Bolesław Kosecki was appointed as the first chairman in the club's history. Base for activities constituted "Jordanówka" and established the club since 1954 the building was "Falcon".
- 1946 - Joseph Schumacher became the club's president, while Józef Łabuz was appointed honorary president.
- 1949 - "Świt" was transformed into the Athletic Field Circle "Spójnia," with Adam Szczepanek as president.
- 1955 - "Spójnia" merged with the Military Sports Club "Podhale" to create "Sparta", with Zdzisław Młyńca elected as president.
- 1957 - renamed to KS "Sparta - Dunajec," with Karol Ziobro in charge.
- 1959 - renamed to Military-Civilian Sports Club "Dunajec".
- The next club presidents were: Stanislłw Gądek (1959–1960), major Julian Strecker (1960–1961), colonel Stanisław Wąs (1961–1978), Józef Biernat (1978–1989), Ryszard Gurbowicz (1989–94).
- Since 1995, the club has been named KS "Dunajec".
