= Stephen Appiah =

Ghanaian footballer (born 1980)

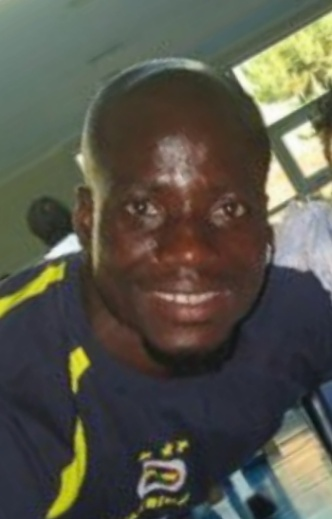
- Appiah with Fenerbahçe in 2006

Personal information
- Full name: Stephen Leroy Appiah
- Date of birth: 24 December 1980 (age 45)
- Place of birth: Accra, Ghana
- Height: 1.78 m (5 ft 10 in)
- Position: Midfielder

Senior career*
Years	Team	Apps	(Gls)
1995–1997	Hearts of Oak	21	(19)
1997–2000	Udinese	36	(0)
2000–2003	Parma	28	(0)
2002–2003	→ Brescia (loan)	31	(7)
2003–2005	Juventus	48	(3)
2005–2008	Fenerbahçe	64	(11)
2009–2010	Bologna	2	(0)
2010–2011	Cesena	14	(0)
2012	Vojvodina	11	(1)
Total		255	(41)

International career
- Ghana U17
- Ghana U20
1996–2010	Ghana	67	(15)
- * Club domestic league appearances and goals

Stephen Leroy Appiah (/ˈæpiɑː/ AP-ee-ah; born 24 December 1980) is a Ghanaian former professional footballer who played as a midfielder. During his career, he played for Udinese, Parma, Brescia, Juventus and Fenerbahçe.

Appiah was a member of the Ghana national team, which he represented at youth, Olympic, and senior levels. He captained Ghana at the World Cup debut in 2006 and in 2010 World Cup.

== Club career ==
=== Early career in Ghana and Italy ===
Appiah began his career at a local club named Hearts of Oak, in 1995, at age 15. In 1996, he had trials with Galatasaray's youth squad but was not signed and he returned to Hearts of Oak.

In 1997, he moved abroad to join Italian Serie A side Udinese, where he initially played as a striker. He spent three seasons with the club, later changing positions during his time there, moving to a deeper midfield position. A transfer to Parma in 1999 was jeopardised by viral hepatitis, but Appiah overcame the illness to move there in the summer of 2000. After two seasons at Parma, Appiah went on loan to Brescia for the 2002–03 season. Appiah became a first-team regular for the Lombardians, and scored seven times in 31 games.

=== Juventus ===
Appiah's success at Parma alerted defending Serie A champions Juventus to his talents. Juventus paid Parma €2 million in the summer of 2003 to secure Appiah's services on loan, with an option to a permanent €6 million transfer in 2004. In 2003, Appiah finished 8th for African Footballer of the Year.

He went on to enjoy a good first season for Juventus, playing in 30 Serie A games and appearing in the Coppa Italia final. He also made his debut in the UEFA Champions League. In his second season at Juventus, Appiah played in 18 Serie A games.

=== Fenerbahçe ===
In July 2005, he was transferred from Juventus to Turkish giants Fenerbahçe for €8 million. He went on to win the Süper Lig championship with the club in their centenary year. In January 2007, he was injured during the international duty with the Black Stars and he delayed the operation on his left knee until end of season.

At the end of the 2006–07 season, Appiah expressed a desire to leave and a German club made an offer of €4 million to Fenerbahçe, after Appiah's agent contacted other clubs without Fenerbahçe's permission. Fenerbahçe rejected the offer.

==== Injury and contract dispute ====
After an extended knee-injury layoff, Appiah came off the bench for Fenerbahçe in the Süper Lig on 6 October 2007. However, the injury recurred after his last game on 1 December, and Appiah went to Italy for rehabilitation on 20 December 2007. The long-term injury forced him to miss the 2008 African Cup of Nations as a player, instead, he became a special adviser of the team. Fenerbahçe also wanted to de-register Appiah as he occupied a foreigner quota, but he refused as he was unclear with the matter. Appiah also refused to take rehabilitation in Turkey. The club also thought that Appiah was actually AWOL and Appiah thought the club exposed his medical history to the press and mistreatment to his injury, although the club defended that it had made an appointment for Appiah to visit Mayo Clinic, United States, but Appiah did not attend. On 1 February 2008, Appiah formally submitted a claim of mistreatment by asking to leave as free agent on 1 July 2008 and received the pre-agreed 2008–09 season salary of €2 million. In response, Fenerbahçe notified FIFA. In April 2008 the case went to FIFA Dispute Resolution Chamber (DRC), and both parties sued each other. He unilaterally terminated the contract at the end of season, as he thought the club had breached the contract by not fulfilling its duties. He also discussed with West Ham United in summer 2008 for a possible contract. DRC ordered Appiah to pay Fenerbahçe €2,281,915 as he breached the contract without just cause on 9 January 2009. He immediately appealed to the Court of Arbitration for Sport in May after received the decision on 5 May 2009 and the club also submitted its appeal. On 7 June 2010 CAS ruled that Appiah did not need to pay Fenerbahçe, as Fenerbahçe saved more in wages (€2,633,020.65) than losses (€2,496,278.85).

=== Serie A return ===
Appiah was on trial with the London-based club Tottenham Hotspur in January 2009 with a view to a 6-month permanent contract, however, concerns over his knee and fitness resulted in no contract being offered, as Spurs took up the option of signing Wilson Palacios from Wigan instead. The following month Appiah underwent a trial at Rubin Kazan, but the Russian champions decided against signing the player because of the same fitness concerns. Despite being without a club since his departure from Fenerbahçe in June 2008, Appiah remained a regular with the national team throughout the 2008–09 season.

On 1 November 2009, Bologna announced the signing of Appiah on a free transfer.

On 7 August 2010, Appiah signed for newly promoted Italian Serie A side Cesena on a one-year deal with the option of signing on for another year if the club managed to remain in the top flight. At the end of the 2010–11 season his contract with Cesena expired, and he became a free agent.

=== Vojvodina ===
On 2 February 2012, after passing medical exams, Appiah signed a six-month deal with Serbian side Vojvodina. Along with Almami Moreira and Aleksandar Katai, he was the main winter-break signing of Vojvodina in order to challenge Belgrade clubs dominance and guarantee a European competition place. He made his Serbian SuperLiga debut as a starter in a 16-round match played on 4 March 2012 against Radnički Kragujevac.

Until the end of the 2011–12 Serbian SuperLiga season, he gathered 11 league appearances and scored his only goal in the deciding last-round home 2–1 victory against Red Star Belgrade, which put Vojvodina on a final third place in the league and guaranteed a spot in next season's UEFA Europa League.

=== Retirement and testimonial ===
After being inactive from football for two-years due to a recurring knee injury, at the age of 33, Appiah announced his retirement from football on 14 January 2015.

On 27 June 2015, a testimonial match was organized to mark the end of his career. The match was played at the Accra Sports Stadium. It featured The Black Stars against Appiah XI, which cumulated former international footballers including; Giuseppe Colucci, Richard Kingson, George Boateng, Sammy Adjei, Samuel Eto'o, Baffour Gyan and Emmanuel Adebayor. The match ended in a 2–2 draw with Appiah scoring the first goal from a free kick for Appiah XI. Asamoah Gyan and Ben Acheampong scored for the Black Stars and Baffour Gyan scored the final equalizer for Appiah XI.

The match was a sell-out, and saw Appiah perform a lap of honour at the end with his family. The testimonial was attended by high rank officials including, former Presidents Jerry John Rawlings and John Agyekum Kufour, Speaker of Parliament Edward Doe Adjaho and the sitting president, John Dramani Mahama, who also performed the ceremonial kick-off. Religious leaders including the national chief Imam of Ghana Sheik Osman Nuhu Sharabutu and Rev. Sam Korankye Ankrah, Apostle General of Royal House Chapel were also present.

Prior to the testimonial, a special dinner and fundraising was held on 26 June at the State Banquet Hall, Accra. All proceeds of the match and fundraising went to charitable causes of his foundation, Step App foundation.

== International career ==
=== Youth ===
Appiah at the 2006 FIFA World Cup

Appiah was part of the Ghana squad which won the FIFA U-17 World Championship tournament in 1995 at age 14. The team beat Brazil in the final to lift the trophy.

=== Olympics ===
In 2004 Olympics game in Athens, Greece. He was one of three 'over-aged players' in the squad. Appiah had carved a niche for himself as a stylish and composed attacking midfielder, who had a deadly eye for goal as well. He scored twice in that short stint in Athens, shining in all three group games, running the attacking department in spectacular fashion.

=== Black Stars ===
Appiah made his Black Stars debut on his 16th birthday He made his debut when Ghana played Benin in a four nations tournament in Cotonou. Appiah replaced then skipper Abedi Pele in the 80th minute after Ghana had taken a commanding 2–0 lead.

He first took over the armband when Ghana faced Slovenia national team in a friendly fixture and would go on to lead the team to secure a historic first-time qualification for the 2006 FIFA World Cup.

Appiah captained Ghana to its first World Cup in 2006. During the tournament, he scored a penalty in the team's final group match, a 2–1 win over the United States, which allowed them to advance to the round of 16 of the tournament.

Appiah also led Ghana to the 2010 FIFA World Cup. On 22 August 2010, following Ghana's World Cup record quarter-final finish, Appiah announced his retirement from the national team at the age of 29. At the end of his international career, he had 67 caps and scored 15 international goals.

== Style of play ==
Appiah was an all-round box-to-box midfielder, who was capable of defending well, as well as orchestrating attacks, due to his vision, technique, powerful physique, and tackling. He was also known for his passing and playmaking ability, as well as his long range shooting ability with his right foot, which along with his ability to make exploit spaces by making late runs, allowed him to create chances for teammates, or even score goals himself. As a versatile player, he was capable of playing anywhere in midfield, and adapting himself to several different formations, but usually operated in the centre of the pitch.

== Other endeavours ==
Appiah has designed a clothing line named StepApp that was released in late November 2007 in his hometown of Accra. All proceeds go to the StepApp foundation. The clothing line will initially be released in Africa before arriving in Europe and the United States in the following months. After release the StepApp clothing line has run into trouble.

=== Black star team manager ===
In May 2017 Appiah was named by the Ghana Football Association (GFA) as the team manager for the Black Star. He was for the first time given the chance to serve as a technical member of the team after retiring from football.

== Personal life ==
Appiah has a son, Rodney Appiah who plays for Accra Great Olympics in the Ghana Premier League.

== Career statistics ==
=== Club ===
Appearances and goals by club, season and competition
Club	Season	League			Cup		Continental		Other		Total	
Club	Season	Division	Apps	Goals	Apps	Goals	Apps	Goals	Apps	Goals	Apps	Goals
Udinese	1997–98	Serie A	11	0	0	0	–		–		11	0
Udinese	1998–99	Serie A	21	0	6	3	–		2 (Note: Two appearances in season UEFA Cup qualification)	0	29	3
Udinese	1999–2000	Serie A	4	0	0	0	1	0	–		5	0
Udinese	Total		36	0	6	3	1	0	2	0	45	3
Parma	2000–01	Serie A	15	0	5	1	6	1	–		26	2
Parma	2001–02	Serie A	13	0	3	0	7	0	–		23	0
Parma	Total		28	0	8	1	13	1	0	0	49	2
Brescia (loan)	2002–03	Serie A	31	7	1	0	0	0	–		32	7
Juventus	2003–04	Serie A	30	1	8	0	7	0	1 (Note: One appearance in 2003 Supercoppa Italiana.)	0	46	1
Juventus	2004–05	Serie A	18	2	2	0	3	0	–		23	2
Juventus	Total		48	3	10	0	10	0	1	0	69	3
Fenerbahçe	2005–06	Süper Lig	32	8	6	1	6	2	–		44	11
Fenerbahçe	2006–07	Süper Lig	26	3	1	0	10	3	–		37	6
Fenerbahçe	2007–08	Süper Lig	6	0	1	0	2	0	–		9	0
Fenerbahçe	Total		64	11	8	1	18	5	0	0	90	17
Bologna	2009–10	Serie A	2	0	0	0	0	0	–		2	0
Cesena	2010–11	Serie A	14	0	1	0	0	0	–		15	0
Vojvodina	2011–12	SuperLiga	11	1	2	0	0	0	–		13	1
Career total			234	22	36	5	42	6	3	0	315	33

=== International ===
Appearances and goals by national team and year
National team	Year	Apps	Goals
Ghana	1996	1	0
Ghana	1997	0	0
Ghana	1998	2	0
Ghana	1999	1	0
Ghana	2000	5	1
Ghana	2001	5	2
Ghana	2002	2	0
Ghana	2003	5	3
Ghana	2004	5	2
Ghana	2005	7	2
Ghana	2006	16	2
Ghana	2007	3	1
Ghana	2008	3	1
Ghana	2009	7	1
Ghana	2010	5	0
Ghana	Total	67	15

== Honours ==
Hearts of Oak

- Ghana Premier League: 1996–97
- Ghanaian FA Cup: 1996

Parma

- Coppa Italia: 2001–02

Juventus

- Serie A: 2004–05 (Note: The 2004–05 title, was revoked following the Calciopoli scandal.)
- Supercoppa Italiana: 2003

Fenerbahçe

- Süper Lig: 2006–07
- Turkish Super Cup: 2007

Ghana U17

- FIFA U-17 World Championship: 1995

Individual

- SWAG Most Promising Football Star of the Year: 1997
- Summer Olympic Football All-Star Team: 2004
- African Cup of Nations Team of the Tournament: 2006
