= Przemysław Szarek =

Polish footballer

Personal information
- Date of birth: 22 April 1996 (age 30)
- Place of birth: Nowy Sącz, Poland
- Height: 1.85 m (6 ft 1 in)
- Position: Centre-back

Team information
- Current team: Poprad Rytro

Youth career
- –2007: Dunajec Nowy Sącz
- 2007–2013: Sandecja Nowy Sącz

Senior career*
Years	Team	Apps	(Gls)
2013–2016	Sandecja Nowy Sącz	60	(4)
2016–2020	Termalica Nieciecza	45	(1)
2020–2022	Korona Kielce	25	(0)
2022–2024	Motor Lublin	36	(3)
2024–2026	Chrobry Głogów	29	(4)
2026–	Poprad Rytro	0	(0)

International career
2012–2013	Poland U17	4	(0)
2013–2014	Poland U18	6	(0)
2014	Poland U19	1	(0)
2015	Poland U20	2	(0)
- * Club domestic league appearances and goals as of 21:02, 31 May 2026 (UTC)

Przemysław Szarek (born 22 April 1996) is a Polish professional footballer who plays as a centre-back for V liga Lesser Poland club Poprad Rytro.

== Club career ==
On 7 August 2020 he signed a two-year contract with Korona Kielce. On 28 February 2022, he left the club by mutual consent.

== Honours ==
Korona Kielce II

- IV liga Świętokrzyskie: 2021–22
