= Oli Rahman =

Ghanaian footballer

Personal information
- Date of birth: 7 July 1975 (age 49)

Medal record

Men's association football

Representing Ghana

Olympic Games
Bronze medal – third place	1992 Barcelona	Team competition

Oli Rahman (born 7 July 1975) is a football player from Ghana, who was a member of the Men's National Team that won the bronze medal at the 1992 Summer Olympics in Barcelona, Spain. He played as a midfielder.
