= Football at the 1992 Summer Olympics =

1992 Summer Olympics Football Tournament
Tournament details
- Host country: Spain
- Dates: 24 July – 8 August 1992
- Teams: 16 (from 6 confederations)
- Venues: 5 (in 4 host cities)

Final positions
- Champions: Spain (1st title)
- Runners-up: Poland
- Third place: Ghana
- Fourth place: Australia

Tournament statistics
- Matches played: 32
- Goals scored: 87 (2.72 per match)
- Top scorer: (Poland) Andrzej Juskowiak (7 goals)

The 1992 Summer Olympics Football Tournament competition at the 1992 Summer Olympics featured 16 national sides from the six continental confederations. The 16 teams were drawn into four groups of four and each group played a round-robin tournament. At the end of the group stage, the top two teams advanced to the knockout stage, beginning with the quarter-finals and culminating with the gold medal match at Camp Nou on 8 August 1992.

For the first time, an age limit has been set for participants under the age of 23 (Under-23), which has been used ever since.

Spain became the first host country to win the gold medal in an Olympic football tournament since Belgium in 1920, an achievement which would not be repeated until Brazil won it in 2016.

Notably, these were the first matches played with football's new back-pass rule and was the last Olympic football competition which was open to men only before the introduction of a women's tournament four years later.

== Competition schedule ==
Legend
G	Group stage	¼	Quarter-finals	½	Semi-finals	B	Bronze medal match	F	Gold medal match

24 Fri	25 Sat	26 Sun	27 Mon	28 Tue	29 Wed	30 Thu	31 Fri	1 Sat	2 Sun	3 Mon	4 Tue	5 Wed	6 Thu	7 Fri	8 Sat
G		G	G	G	G	G		¼	¼			½		B	F

== Qualification ==
The following 16 teams qualified for the 1992 Olympic men's football tournament:

Means of qualification	Berths	Qualified
Host nation	1	Spain
1992 UEFA European Under-21 Football Championship	4	Italy; Sweden; Denmark; Poland
AFC Preliminary Competition	3	Qatar; South Korea; Kuwait
CAF Preliminary Competition	3	Egypt; Ghana; Morocco
1992 CONCACAF Pre-Olympic Tournament	2	Mexico; United States
1992 CONMEBOL Pre-Olympic Tournament	2	Colombia; Paraguay
OFC–UEFA play-off	1	Australia
Total	16	

== Venues ==
Barcelona		Valencia
Camp Nou	Estadi de Sarrià	Estadio Luis Casanova
Capacity: 100,000	Capacity: 42,000	Capacity: 50,000
Sabadell	Football at the 1992 Summer Olympics is located in Spain	
Estadi de la Nova Creu Alta	Football at the 1992 Summer Olympics is located in Spain	
Capacity: 16,000	Football at the 1992 Summer Olympics is located in Spain	
Zaragoza	Football at the 1992 Summer Olympics is located in Spain	
Estadio La Romareda	Football at the 1992 Summer Olympics is located in Spain	
Capacity: 43,001	Football at the 1992 Summer Olympics is located in Spain	

== Match officials ==
Africa

- (Algeria) Mohamed Sendid
- (Mauritius) Lim Kee Chong

Asia

- (Japan) Kiichiro Tachi
- (United Arab Emirates) Ali Bujsaim

South America

- (Brazil) Márcio Rezende de Freitas
- (Colombia) José Torres Cadena
- (Paraguay) Juan Francisco Escobar

North and Central America

- (Mexico) Arturo Brizio Carter
- (United States) Arturo Angeles

Europe

- (Bulgaria) Lube Spassov
- (United Kingdom) Philip Don
- (Germany) Markus Merk
- (Italy) Fabio Baldas
- (Spain) Manuel Díaz Vega

== Group stage ==
=== Group A ===
Team	Pld	W	D	L	GF	GA	GD	Pts
Poland	3	2	1	0	7	2	+5	5
Italy	3	2	0	1	3	4	−1	4
United States	3	1	1	1	6	5	+1	3
Kuwait	3	0	0	3	1	6	−5	0

Source: FIFA
24 July 1992
18:00

Italy	2–1	United States
Melli 15'; Albertini 22'	Report	Moore 65'

Camp Nou, Barcelona
Attendance: 18,000
Referee: Manuel Díaz Vega (ESP)
24 July 1992
20:00

Poland	2–0	Kuwait
Juskowiak 7', 80'	Report

Estadio La Romareda, Zaragoza
Attendance: 2,000
Referee: Juan Francisco Escobar (PAR)

27 July 1992
19:00

United States	3–1	Kuwait
Brose 56'; Lagos 79'; Snow 85'	Report	Marwi 16'

Estadio La Romareda, Zaragoza
Attendance: 4,500
Referee: Lim Kee Chong (MRI)
27 July 1992
21:00

Italy	0–3	Poland
	Report	Juskowiak 5'; Staniek 48'; Mielcarski 90'

Estadi de Sarrià, Barcelona
Attendance: 15,000
Referee: Philip Don (GBR)

29 July 1992
19:00

United States	2–2	Poland
Imler 20'; Snow 85'	Report	Koźmiński 31'; Juskowiak 40'

Estadio La Romareda, Zaragoza
Attendance: 3,000
Referee: Lim Kee Chong (MRI)
29 July 1992
21:00

Italy	1–0	Kuwait
Melli 10'	Report

Estadi de Sarrià, Barcelona
Attendance: 8,000
Referee: Arturo Brizio Carter (MEX)

=== Group B ===
Team	Pld	W	D	L	GF	GA	GD	Pts
Spain	3	3	0	0	8	0	+8	6
Qatar	3	1	1	1	2	3	−1	3
Egypt	3	1	0	2	4	6	−2	2
Colombia	3	0	1	2	4	9	−5	1

Source: FIFA
24 July 1992
21:00

Spain	4–0	Colombia
Guardiola 10'; Kiko 37'; Berges 41'; Luis Enrique 69'	Report

Estadio Luis Casanova, Valencia
Attendance: 18,000
Referee: Markus Merk (GER)
24 July 1992
20:00

Egypt	0–1	Qatar
	Report	Mustafa 74'

Estadi de la Nova Creu Alta, Sabadell
Attendance: 2,000
Referee: Philip Don (GBR)

27 July 1992
21:00

Spain	2–0	Egypt
Solozábal 55'; Soler 70'	Report

Estadio Luis Casanova, Valencia
Attendance: 15,000
Referee: Marcio Rezende de Freitas (BRA)
27 July 1992
19:00

Colombia	1–1	Qatar
Aristizábal 62'	Report	Soufi 89'

Estadi de la Nova Creu Alta, Sabadell
Attendance: 2,000
Referee: Arturo Brizio Carter (MEX)

29 July 1992
21:00

Spain	2–0	Qatar
Alfonso 40'; Kiko 60'	Report

Estadio Luis Casanova, Valencia
Attendance: 19,300
Referee: Arturo Angeles (USA)
29 July 1992
19:00

Colombia	3–4	Egypt
Gaviria 9', 84'; Pacheco 14'	Report	Youssef 27'; El-Masry 47'; Khashaba 90+1', 90+4'

Estadi de la Nova Creu Alta, Sabadell
Attendance: 4,500
Referee: Ali Bujsaim (UAE)

=== Group C ===
Team	Pld	W	D	L	GF	GA	GD	Pts
Sweden	3	1	2	0	5	1	+4	4
Paraguay	3	1	2	0	3	1	+2	4
South Korea	3	0	3	0	2	2	0	3
Morocco	3	0	1	2	2	8	−6	1

Source: FIFA
26 July 1992
21:00

Sweden	0–0	Paraguay
	Report

Camp Nou, Barcelona
Attendance: 15,000
Referee: Lube Spassov (BUL)
26 July 1992
21:00

Morocco	1–1	South Korea
Bahja 64'	Report	Jung Jae-kwon 73'

Estadio Luis Casanova, Valencia
Attendance: 2,000
Referee: Arturo Angeles (USA)

28 July 1992
19:00

Sweden	4–0	Morocco
Brolin 14', 69'; Mild 20'; Rödlund 57'	Report

Estadio Nova Creu Alta, Sabadell
Attendance: 5,000
Referee: José Torres Cadena (COL)
28 July 1992
21:00

Paraguay	0–0	South Korea
	Report

Estadio Luis Casanova, Valencia
Attendance: 2,000
Referee: Mohamed Sendid (ALG)

30 July 1992
21:00

Sweden	1–1	South Korea
Rödlund 52'	Report	Seo Jung-won 28'

Camp Nou, Barcelona
Attendance: 12,000
Referee: Manuel Díaz Vega (ESP)
30 July 1992
21:00

Paraguay	3–1	Morocco
Arce 43'; Caballero 57'; Gamarra 70'	Report	Naybet 87'

Estadio Luis Casanova, Valencia
Attendance: 2,000
Referee: Markus Merk (GER)

=== Group D ===
Team	Pld	W	D	L	GF	GA	GD	Pts
Ghana	3	1	2	0	4	2	+2	4
Australia	3	1	1	1	5	4	+1	3
Mexico	3	0	3	0	3	3	0	3
Denmark	3	0	2	1	1	4	−3	2

Source: FIFA
26 July 1992
19:00

Denmark	1–1	Mexico
Thomsen 85'	Report	Rotllán 39' (pen.)

Estadio La Romareda, Zaragoza
Attendance: 8,000
Referee: Fabio Baldas (Italy)
26 July 1992
19:00

Ghana	3–1	Australia
Gargo 12'; Ayew 83', 89'	Report	Vidmar 90+1'

Estadi de la Nova Creu Alta, Sabadell
Attendance: 4,000
Referee: Ali Bujsaim (United Arab Emirates)

28 July 1992
19:00

Denmark	0–0	Ghana
	Report

Estadio La Romareda, Zaragoza
Attendance: 5,000
Referee: Juan Francisco Escobar (Paraguay)
28 July 1992
21:00

Mexico	1–1	Australia
Castañeda 63'	Report	Arambasic 20'

Estadi de Sarrià, Barcelona
Attendance: 10,000
Referee: Kiichiro Tachi (Japan)

30 July 1992
19:00

Denmark	0–3	Australia
	Report	Markovski 32'; Mori 60'; Vidmar 75'

Estadio La Romareda, Zaragoza
Attendance: 3,000
Referee: Fabio Baldas (Italy)
30 July 1992
19:00

Mexico	1–1	Ghana
Rotllán 30'	Report	Ayew 79'

Estadi de la Nova Creu Alta, Sabadell
Attendance: 6,000
Referee: José Torres Cadena (Colombia)

== Knockout stage ==
Quarter-finals
1 August – Valencia
Spain	1
Italy	0
2 August – Zaragoza
Paraguay	2
Ghana (a.e.t.)	4
1 August – Barcelona (Camp Nou)
Poland	2
Qatar	0
2 August – Barcelona (Camp Nou)
Sweden	1
Australia	2

Semi-finals
5 August – Valencia
Spain	2
Ghana	0
5 August – Barcelona (Camp Nou)
Poland	6
Australia	1

Gold medal match
8 August – Barcelona (Camp Nou)
Spain	3
Poland	2
Bronze medal match
7 August – Barcelona (Camp Nou)
Ghana	1
Australia	0

=== Quarter-finals ===
1 August 1992
19:00

Spain	1–0	Italy
Kiko 38'	Report

Estadio Luis Casanova, Valencia
Attendance: 28,000
Referee: Rezende de Freitas (BRA)
1 August 1992
21:30

Poland	2–0	Qatar
Kowalczyk 42'; Jałocha 74'	Report

Camp Nou, Barcelona
Attendance: 25,000
Referee: Sendid (ALG)

2 August 1992
19:00

Paraguay	2–4 (a.e.t.)	Ghana
Acheampong 78' (o.g.); Campos 81'	Report	Ayew 17', 55', 120+1'; Rahman 114'

Estadio La Romareda, Zaragoza
Attendance: 5,000
Referee: Bujsaim (UAE)
2 August 1992
21:30

Sweden	1–2	Australia
Andersson 60'	Report	Markovski 30'; Murphy 53'

Camp Nou, Barcelona
Attendance: 22,000
Referee: Brizio Carter (MEX)

=== Semi-finals ===
5 August 1992
19:00

Spain	2–0	Ghana
Abelardo 26'; Berges 54'	Report

Estadio Luis Casanova, Valencia
Attendance: 36,000
Referee: Brizio Carter (MEX)
5 August 1992
21:30

Poland	6–1	Australia
Kowalczyk 27', 88'; Juskowiak 43', 52', 78'; Murphy 67' (o.g.)	Report	Veart 35'

Camp Nou, Barcelona
Attendance: 45,000
Referee: Rezende de Freitas (BRA)

=== Bronze medal match ===
7 August 1992
20:00

Australia	0–1	Ghana
	Report	Asare 19'

Camp Nou, Barcelona
Attendance: 15,000
Referee: Díaz Vega (ESP)

=== Gold medal match ===
8 August 1992
20:00

Spain	3–2	Poland
Abelardo 65'; Kiko 71', 90+1'	Report	Kowalczyk 45+1'; Staniek 76'

Camp Nou, Barcelona
Attendance: 95,000
Referee: Torres Cadena (Colombia)

Team details

Poland
Spain

GK	1	Aleksander Kłak
RB	2	Marcin Jałocha		(substituted off) 55'
CB	5	Tomasz Wałdoch	(yellow card) 31'
CB	6	Dariusz Gęsior
LB	3	Tomasz Łapiński
CM	4	Marek Koźmiński
CM	10	Jerzy Brzęczek (c)
CM	15	Andrzej Kobylański
AM	13	Ryszard Staniek
CF	20	Wojciech Kowalczyk	(yellow card) 74'
CF	11	Andrzej Juskowiak
Substitutes:
MF	7	Piotr Świerczewski		(substituted on) 55'
Manager:
Janusz Wójcik

GK	13	Toni
RB	2	Albert Ferrer (c)
CB	4	Roberto Solozábal
CB	5	Juanma López
CB	10	Abelardo
LB	3	Mikel Lasa	(substituted off) 51'
CM	8	Luis Enrique
CM	9	Josep Guardiola
CM	17	Rafael Berges
CF	19	Kiko
CF	20	Alfonso
Substitutes:
MF	7	Amavisca	(substituted on) 51'
Manager:
Vicente Miera

== Medal winners ==
Gold medalists – Spain

José Amavisca
Rafael Berges
Santiago Cañizares
Abelardo
Albert Ferrer
Josep Guardiola
Miguel Hernández
Toni Jiménez
Mikel Lasa
Juanma López
Javier Manjarín
Luis Enrique
Kiko Narváez
Alfonso Pérez
Antonio Pinilla
Paco Soler
Gabriel Vidal
Roberto Solozábal
David Billabona
Paqui

Coach: Vicente Miera

Silver medalists – Poland

Dariusz Adamczuk
Marek Bajor
Jerzy Brzęczek
Marek Koźmiński
Dariusz Gęsior
Marcin Jałocha
Tomasz Łapiński
Tomasz Wałdoch
Aleksander Kłak
Andrzej Kobylański
Ryszard Staniek
Wojciech Kowalczyk
Andrzej Juskowiak
Grzegorz Mielcarski
Piotr Świerczewski
Mirosław Waligóra
Dariusz Koseła
Arkadiusz Onyszko
Dariusz Szubert
Tomasz Wieszczycki

Coach: Janusz Wójcik

Bronze medalists – Ghana

Joachim Acheampong
Simon Addo
Sammi Adjei
Maxwell Konadu
Mamood Amadu
Isaac Asare
Frank Amankwah
Bernard Aryee
Kwame Ayew
Ibrahim Dossey
Mohammed Gargo
Dramani Kalilu
Samuel Kuffour
Samuel Kumah
Nii Lamptey
Anthony Mensah
Alex Nyarko
Yaw Preko
Shamo Quaye
Oli Rahman

Coach: Sam Arday

== Goalscorers ==
With seven goals, Poland's Andrzej Juskowiak was the top scorer of the tournament. In total, 87 goals were scored by 57 different players, with two of them credited as own goals.

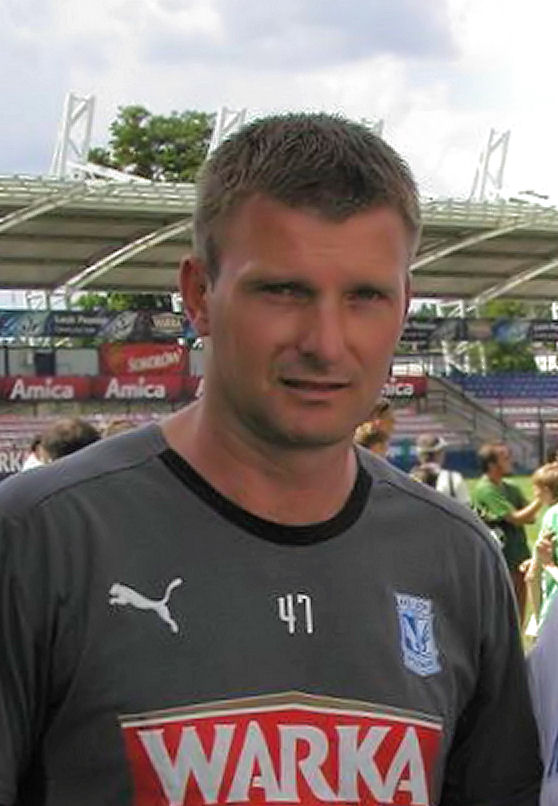
Andrzej Juskowiak, the tournament's top scorer

7 goals

- (Poland) Andrzej Juskowiak

6 goals

- (Ghana) Kwame Ayew

5 goals

- (Spain) Kiko

4 goals

- (Poland) Wojciech Kowalczyk

2 goals

- (Australia) John Markovski
- (Australia) Tony Vidmar
- (Colombia) Hernán Gaviria
- (Egypt) Hady Khashaba
- (Italy) Alessandro Melli
- (Mexico) Francisco Rotllán
- (Poland) Ryszard Staniek
- (Spain) Abelardo
- (Spain) Rafael Berges
- (Sweden) Tomas Brolin
- (Sweden) Jonny Rödlund
- (United States) Steve Snow

1 goal

- (Australia) Zlatko Arambašić
- (Australia) Damian Mori
- (Australia) Shaun Murphy
- (Australia) Carl Veart
- (Colombia) Víctor Aristizábal
- (Colombia) Víctor Pacheco
- (Denmark) Claus Thomsen
- (Egypt) Ibrahim El-Masry
- (Egypt) Mohamed Youssef
- (Ghana) Isaac Asare
- (Ghana) Mohammed Gargo
- (Ghana) Oli Rahman
- (Italy) Demetrio Albertini
- (South Korea) Jung Jae-kwon
- (South Korea) Seo Jung-won
- (Kuwait) Ali Marwi
- (Mexico) Jorge Castañeda
- (Morocco) Ahmed Bahja
- (Morocco) Noureddine Naybet
- (Paraguay) Francisco Arce
- (Paraguay) Mauro Caballero
- (Paraguay) Jorge Campos
- (Paraguay) Carlos Gamarra
- (Poland) Marcin Jałocha
- (Poland) Marek Koźmiński
- (Poland) Grzegorz Mielcarski
- (Qatar) Mahmoud Soufi
- (Qatar) Mubarak Mustafa
- (Spain) Alfonso
- (Spain) Pep Guardiola
- (Spain) Luis Enrique
- (Spain) Paco Soler
- (Spain) Roberto Solozábal
- (Sweden) Patrik Andersson
- (Sweden) Håkan Mild
- (United States) Dario Brose
- (United States) Erik Imler
- (United States) Manuel Lagos
- (United States) Joe-Max Moore

Own goals

- (Australia) Shaun Murphy (playing against Poland)
- (Ghana) Joachim Acheampong (playing against Paraguay)

== Final ranking ==
Pos	Team	Pld	W	D	L	GF	GA	GD	Pts
1	Spain	6	6	0	0	14	2	+12	12
2	Poland	6	4	1	1	17	6	+11	9
3	Ghana	6	3	2	1	9	6	+3	8
4	Australia	6	2	1	3	8	12	−4	5
5	Sweden	4	1	2	1	6	3	+3	4
6	Paraguay	4	1	2	1	5	5	0	4
7	Italy	4	2	0	2	3	5	−2	4
8	Qatar	4	1	1	2	2	5	−3	3
9	United States	3	1	1	1	6	5	+1	3
10	Mexico	3	0	3	0	3	3	0	3
11	South Korea	3	0	3	0	2	2	0	3
12	Egypt	3	1	0	2	4	6	−2	2
13	Denmark	3	0	2	1	1	4	−3	2
14	Colombia	3	0	1	2	4	9	−5	1
15	Morocco	3	0	1	2	2	8	−6	1
16	Kuwait	3	0	0	3	1	6	−5	0
