= Adrian Danek =

Polish professional footballer

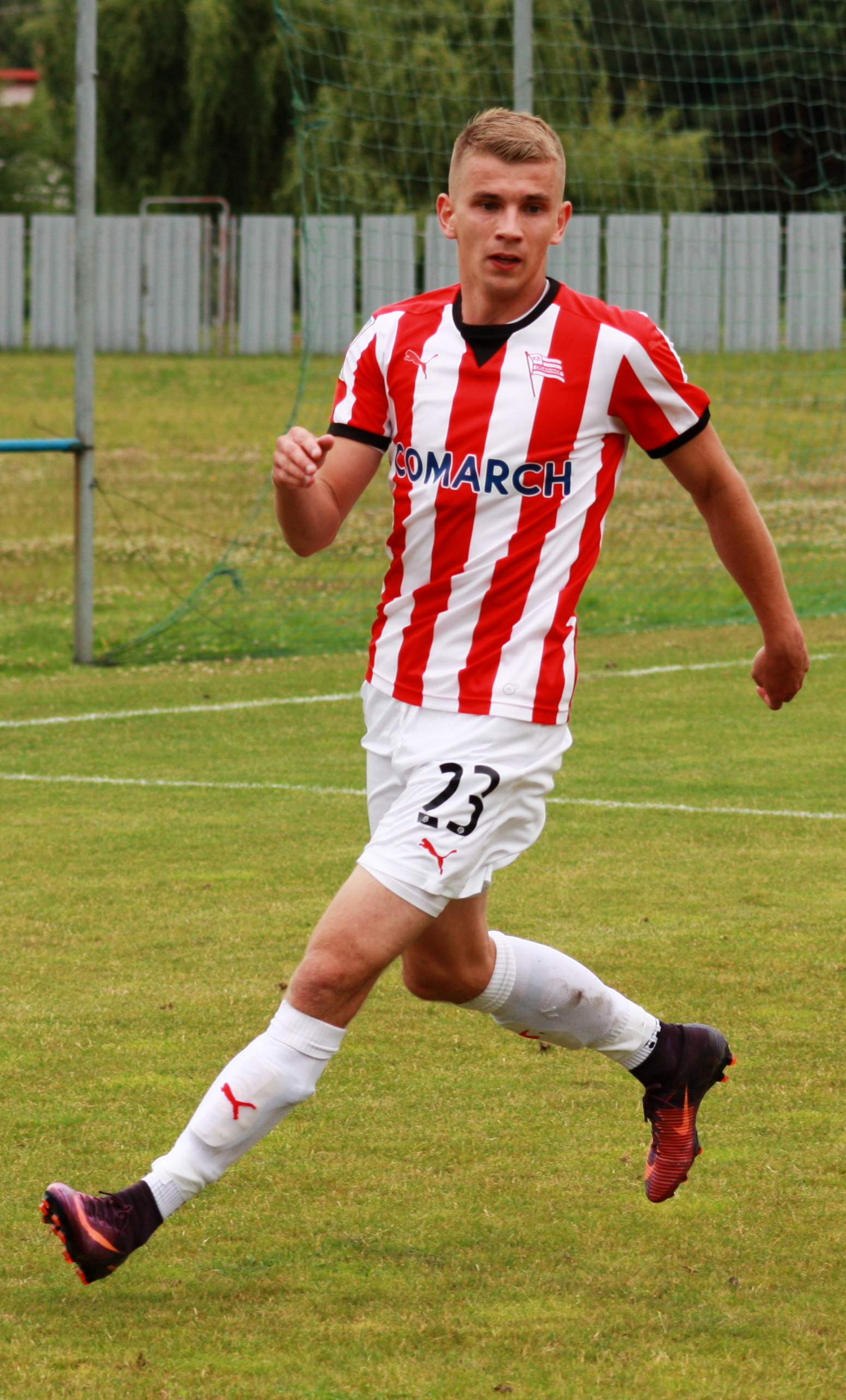
- Danek with Cracovia in 2018

Personal information
- Full name: Adrian Danek
- Date of birth: 1 August 1994 (age 32)
- Place of birth: Nowy Sącz, Poland
- Height: 1.83 m (6 ft 0 in)
- Position: Full-back

Team information
- Current team: Sandecja Nowy Sącz
- Number: 23

Youth career
- Dunajec Nowy Sącz
- Sandecja Nowy Sącz

Senior career*
Years	Team	Apps	(Gls)
2013	Kolejarz Stróże	3	(0)
2014–2018	Sandecja Nowy Sącz	97	(5)
2018–2019	Cracovia	1	(0)
2019–2021	Sandecja Nowy Sącz	58	(0)
2021–2023	Korona Kielce	49	(2)
2021–2023	Korona Kielce II	3	(2)
2023–2025	GKS Katowice	11	(1)
2026–	Sandecja Nowy Sącz	6	(0)
- * Club domestic league appearances and goals as of 14:19, 6 June 2026 (UTC)

Adrian Danek (born 1 August 1994) is a Polish professional footballer who plays as a full-back for II liga club Sandecja Nowy Sącz.

== Honours ==
Sandecja Nowy Sącz

- I liga: 2016–17

Korona Kielce II

- IV liga Świętokrzyskie: 2021–22
