= Francisco Rotllán =

Mexican footballer (born 1970)

Personal information
- Full name: Francisco Rotllán Zavala
- Date of birth: January 6, 1970 (age 56)
- Place of birth: Irapuato, Mexico
- Height: 1.82 m (6 ft 0 in)
- Position: Forward

Senior career*
| Years | Team | Apps | (Gls) |
| ?–? | Irapuato FC | ? | (?) |
| 1996–1997 | Club Puebla | 19 | (3) |
| 2000 | C.F. Monterrey | 1 | (0) |

International career
| 1992 | Mexico U23 | 3 | (0) |

Managerial career
- 2006: Monarcas Morelia A (Assistant)
- 2007: Cachorros León (Assistant)
- 2009: Santos Laguna (Assistant)
- 2010: Veracruz (Assistant)
- 2011: Necaxa (Assistant)
- 2011: Puebla (Assistant)
- 2012: San Luis (Assistant)
- 2012–2013: Querétaro (Assistant)
- 2015: Cruz Azul (Assistant)
- 2016–2017: Chiapas (Assistant)
- 2018–2019: Querétaro (Assistant)
- 2020: Atlas (Assistant)
- 2021: UAT
- 2023: UNAM (assistant)
- 2023–2024: UANL (assistant)
- 2025: Mazatlán (assistant)
- * Club domestic league appearances and goals as of 19-07-10

Francisco Rotllán Zavala (born January 6, 1970) is a Mexican former footballer who played as a forward. He began his career at Irapuato, moving to Puebla in 1991. He made 15 appearances as Puebla reached the final in the 1991–92 season before losing to León. Rotllán scored 10 times the next season, but played progressively less in the following years. He played his last top-division match with Puebla in 1997.

He was a member of the Mexico under-23 national team in the 1992 Olympics in Barcelona, Spain. Rotllán started all three of Mexico's matches in the Olympics, scoring against Denmark and Ghana.
