= Joachim Yaw =

Ghanaian footballer

Personal information
- Full name: Joachim Yaw Acheampong
- Date of birth: 2 November 1973 (age 51)
- Place of birth: Accra, Ghana
- Height: 1.81 m (5 ft 11 in)

Medal record

Men's association football

Representing Ghana

Olympic Games
Bronze medal – third place	1992 Barcelona	Team competition

Joachim Yaw Acheampong (born 2 November 1973 in Accra), known as Yaw, is a Ghanaian retired footballer who played as a midfielder.

== Club career ==
In his country Yaw represented Goldfields Obuasi (1990–94), Power FC (1999–2000) and King Faisal Babes (2001). Abroad he played for IFK Norrköping in Sweden (1994–95), Spain's Real Sociedad (1995–97) and Hércules CF (1997–98) and Samsunspor (1998) and Yimpaş Yozgatspor (2001–02) from Turkey.

Yaw retired from professional football at the age of only 28.

== International career ==
Yaw was part of the Ghanaian Olympic team who won the bronze medal at the 1992 Summer Olympics in Barcelona. He featured in five of six games in the tournament.

Yaw gained 18 caps with the full side, during five years. He appeared in two Africa Cup of Nations editions.
