= Mohamed Sendid =

Algerian football referee

Mohamed Sendid (Arabic: محمد صنديد) (born in Oran) is a former Algerian football referee. He was a referee at the 1992 Summer Olympic Games, as well as FIFA World Cup qualifiers.
