= Marek Koźmiński =

Polish footballer (born 1971)

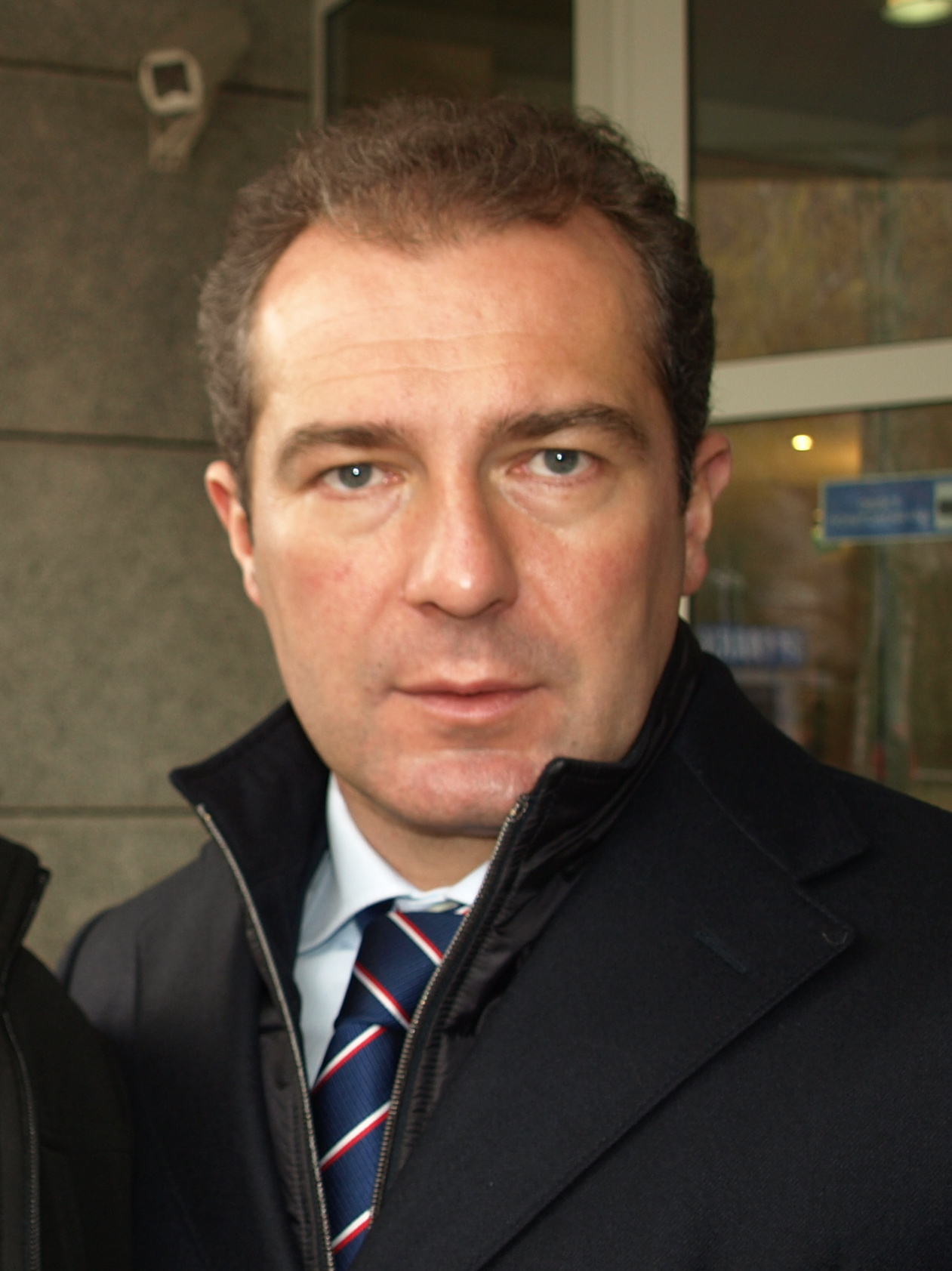

Personal information
- Full name: Marek Jan Koźmiński
- Date of birth: 7 February 1971 (age 55)
- Place of birth: Kraków, Polish People’s Republic
- Height: 1.80 m (5 ft 11 in)
- Positions: Defender; midfielder

Senior career*
Years	Team	Apps	(Gls)
1989–1992	Hutnik Kraków	94	(5)
1992–1997	Udinese	97	(5)
1997–2001	Brescia	110	(3)
2002	Ancona	5	(0)
2002	PAOK	9	(0)
2003	Górnik Zabrze	11	(1)
Total		326	(14)

International career
- Poland Olympic
1992–2002	Poland	45	(1)
Medal record
Representing Poland
Men's football
Olympic Games
Silver medal – second place	1992 Barcelona	Team
- * Club domestic league appearances and goals

Marek Jan Koźmiński (Polish pronunciation: [ˈmarɛk ˈjan kɔʑˈmʲiɲskʲi]) (born 7 February 1971) is a Polish football executive and former player who played as a left-sided defender or midfielder.

== Career ==
=== Club ===
He played for clubs such as Hutnik Kraków, Italian outfits Udinese, Brescia and Ancona, Greek side PAOK, before retiring after a stint with Górnik Zabrze.

=== International ===
He made 45 appearances for the Poland national team. Koźmiński was a participant at the 1992 Summer Olympics, where Poland won the silver medal, and at the 2002 FIFA World Cup.

== Career statistics ==
=== International ===
Appearances and goals by national team and year
National team	Year	Apps	Goals
Poland	1992	2	1
Poland	1993	7	0
Poland	1994	3	0
Poland	1995	6	0
Poland	1997	3	0
Poland	1998	3	0
Poland	2000	3	0
Poland	2001	11	0
Poland	2002	7	0
Total		45	1

Scores and results list Poland's goal tally first, score column indicates score after each Koźmiński goal.

List of international goals scored by Marek Koźmiński
No.	Date	Venue	Opponent	Score	Result	Competition
1	14 October 1992	De Kuip, Rotterdam, Netherlands	Netherlands	1–0	2–2	1994 FIFA World Cup qualification

== Honours ==
Poland Olympic

- Olympic silver medal: 1992

Individual

- Polish Newcomer of the Year: 1992
