= Simone Dallamano =

Italian footballer (born 1983)

Personal information
- Date of birth: 25 November 1983 (age 42)
- Place of birth: Brescia, Italy
- Height: 1.80 m (5 ft 11 in)
- Position: Defender

Youth career
- Brescia

Senior career*
Years	Team	Apps	(Gls)
2001–2013	Brescia	194	(9)
2001–2002	→ Mantova (loan)	29	(2)
2002–2003	→ Prato (loan)	4	(0)
2003–2004	→ Lumezzane (loan)	21	(0)
2013	Cesena	1	(0)
2013–	L'Aquila	28	(0)

International career^{‡}
2004–2005	Italy U21	3	(0)
- * Club domestic league appearances and goals as of end of 1314 season ‡ National team caps and goals as of 16:12, 4 December 2009 (UTC)

Simone Dallamano (born 25 November 1983) is a former Italian footballer who last played as a defender for L'Aquila in Serie C.

== Club career ==
Dallamano started his career at his native club Brescia. After three seasons loaned to Serie C1 and Serie C2 clubs, he played his first Serie A match on 19 September 2004 in his return to Brescia.

In January 2013, Dallamano joined Cesena on free transfer on a six-month contract. He picked no.4 shirt vacated by Daniele Forte.

On 31 August 2013, Dallamano joined L'Aquila.

== International career ==
Along with teammate Marco Zambelli, Dallamano was called up to the Italy national under-21 team; he obtained three caps between 2004 and 2005 at international youth level.
