= Gilberto Martínez =

Costa Rican footballer (born 1979)

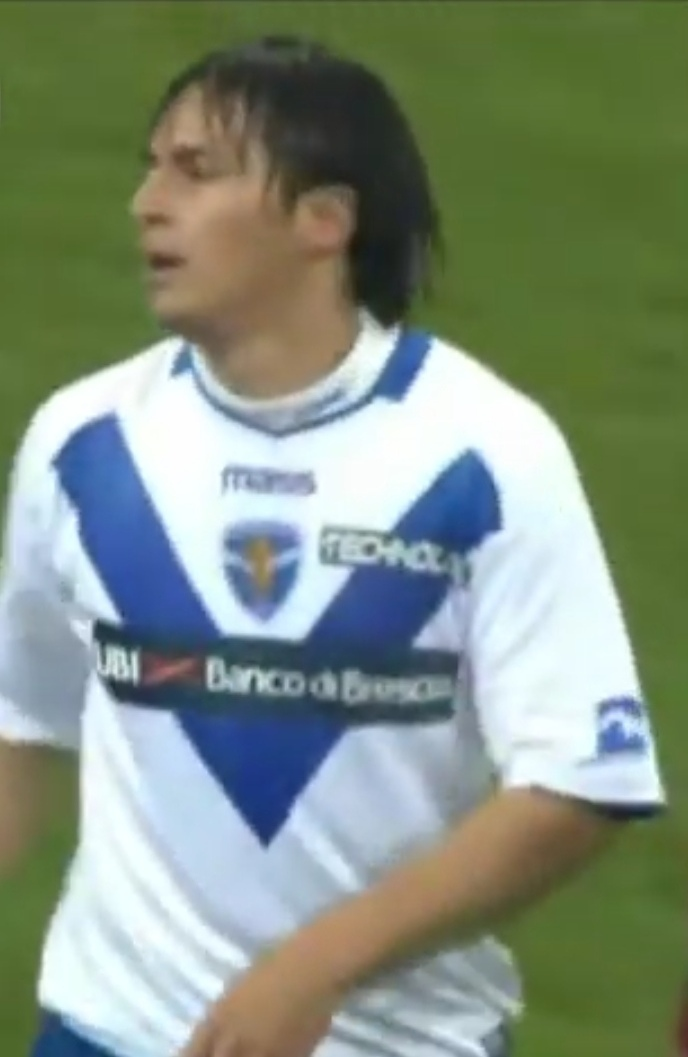

Personal information
- Full name: Gilberto Martínez Vidal
- Date of birth: October 1, 1979 (age 47)
- Place of birth: Golfito, Costa Rica
- Height: 1.74 m (5 ft 9 in)
- Positions: Right back; centre back

Team information
- Current team: Audace Cerignola

Youth career
- Saprissa

Senior career*
Years	Team	Apps	(Gls)
1999–2002	Saprissa	68	(0)
2002–2012	Brescia	218	(1)
2006–2007	→ Roma (loan)	0	(0)
2011	→ Sampdoria (loan)	9	(0)
2013–2015	Lecce	55	(0)
2015	Monza	15	(0)
2015–2016	Nardò		
2016–2018	Audace Cerignola		

International career
2001–2011	Costa Rica	61	(0)
- * Club domestic league appearances and goals as of 21 October 2016

Gilberto Martínez Vidal (born October 1, 1979) is a Costa Rican former professional footballer who played as a defender.

== Club career ==
=== Deportivo Saprissa ===
Born in the Pacific Coast town of in Golfito, Costa Rica, Martínez made his professional debut for Deportivo Saprissa on 19 January 2000 in a 4–0 win over Cartaginés. His performances in the domestic league and Nigeria's Football World Youth Championship soon earned him a place on the Costa Rica national football team. Martínez quickly established himself there as well, becoming one of the most wanted and loved from the fans. He started all three of the team's games in the 2002 FIFA World Cup, and his performances were well regarded.

=== Brescia Calcio ===
Due to his World Cup performances, Brescia purchased him from Deportivo Saprissa on September 15 of the same year. In his initial seasons with Brescia, Martínez established himself as a mainstay in the rondinelle defense line. However, an ankle injury he suffered during the 2006 FIFA World Cup limited him in the following seasons; he spent the whole 2006–07 season on loan to Roma, but failed to make an impact as he failed to recover from his injury. He returned to Brescia at the start of the 2007–08 season without having made a single appearance for the Rome-based club. He ultimately made his playing comeback in the 2008–09 season, confirming himself once again as a key player for his club, then in Serie B.

In February 2011 he was loaned to Sampdoria.

In January 2013, Martínez joined Lecce.

== International career ==
He was part of Costa Rica's national team in the 1999 FIFA World Youth Championship held in Nigeria.

Nicknamed Tuma, Martínez made his debut for Costa Rica in a January 2001 FIFA World Cup qualification match against Guatemala and earned a total of 61 caps, scoring no goals. He represented his country in 26 FIFA World Cup qualification matches and played at both the 2002 and 2006 FIFA World Cups. He also played at the 2001 UNCAF Nations Cup as well as at the 2002 and 2003 CONCACAF Gold Cups.

He also played at the 2001 Copa América.

His final international was a March 2011 friendly match against Argentina.

== Career statistics ==
Club performance			League		Cup		League Cup		Continental		Total	
Season	Club	League	Apps	Goals	Apps	Goals	Apps	Goals	Apps	Goals	Apps	Goals
Costa Rica			League		Cup		League Cup		North America		Total	
1999-00	Deportivo Saprissa		11	0								
2000-01	Deportivo Saprissa		26	0								
2001-02	Deportivo Saprissa		31	0								
Italy			League		Coppa Italia		League Cup		Europe		Total	
2002–03	Brescia	Serie A	34	0								
2003–04	Brescia	Serie A	30	0								
2004–05	Brescia	Serie A	33	1								
2005–06	Brescia	Serie B	35	0								
2006–07	Roma	Serie A	0	0								
2007–08	Brescia	Serie B	0	0								
2008–09	Brescia	Serie B	30	0								
2009–10	Brescia	Serie B	14	0								
2010–11	Brescia	Serie A	19	0								
2010–11	Sampdoria	Serie A	9	0								
2011–12	Brescia	Serie B	23	0								
Total	Costa Rica		68	0								
Total	Italy		227	1								
Career total			295	1								

- 2021 Former DT Municipal Grecia | Costa Rica
