= Víctor Mareco =

Paraguayan footballer (born 1984)

Personal information
- Full name: Víctor Hugo Mareco
- Date of birth: 26 February 1984 (age 42)
- Place of birth: Asunción, Paraguay
- Height: 1.89 m (6 ft 2 1/2 in)
- Position: Centre back

Team information
- Current team: Cerro Porteño
- Number: 13

Youth career
- 2001–2002: Brescia

Senior career*
Years	Team	Apps	(Gls)
2002–2012	Brescia	207	(6)
2011–2012	→ Verona (loan)	32	(0)
2012–	Cerro Porteño	90	(2)

International career^{‡}
2003	Paraguay U20	13	(1)
2011	Paraguay	1	(0)
- * Club domestic league appearances and goals as of 18 February 2016 ‡ National team caps and goals as of 18 February 2016

Víctor Hugo Mareco (born 26 February 1984, in Asunción) is a Paraguayan former football defender.

== Club career ==
Mareco was Brescia Calcio's long serving defender who spent ten years with the Italian club.

== International career ==
Mareco played for Paraguay at youth level at the 2001 FIFA U-17 World Championship and the 2003 FIFA World Youth Championship.

He made his senior international debut for Paraguay in 2012 against the USA.
