= Stefano Bono =

Italian footballer

Personal information
- Date of birth: 18 June 1979 (age 47)
- Place of birth: Chiari, Italy
- Height: 1.68 m (5 ft 6 in)
- Position: Midfielder

Senior career*
| Years | Team | Apps | (Gls) |
| 1996–1999 | Brescia | 4 | (0) |
| 1998–1999 | → Lecco (loan) | 23 | (0) |
| 1999–2000 | Ascoli | 26 | (1) |
| 2000–2002 | Ancona | 50 | (1) |
| 2002–2003 | Reggiana | 47 | (1) |
| 2004–2005 | Pisa | 47 | (1) |
| 2005–2007 | Venezia | 62 | (1) |
| 2007–2008 | Lucchese | 29 | (0) |
| 2008–2009 | Venezia | 27 | (0) |
| 2009–2010 | Carpenedolo | 32 | (0) |
| 2010 | Vigevano | 5 | (0) |
| 2011–2012 | Belluno | 46 | (3) |
| 2012–2016 | Olginatese | 104 | (3) |

International career
| 1996 | Italy U-17 | 5 | (0) |
| 1996–1997 | Italy U-18 | 7 | (1) |
- * Club domestic league appearances and goals

Stefano Bono (born June 18, 1979, in Chiari) is a former Italian professional football player. He played one game in the Serie A in the 1997/98 season for Brescia Calcio.he is now working as assistant manager.
