= Mario Salgado =

Chilean footballer (born 1981)

Personal information
- Full name: Mario Antonio Salgado Jiménez
- Date of birth: 3 June 1981 (age 45)
- Place of birth: Talcahuano, Chile
- Height: 1.86 m (6 ft 1 in)
- Position: Striker

Team information
- Current team: Deportes Concepción (assistant)

Youth career
- Huachipato

Senior career*
Years	Team	Apps	(Gls)
2000–2001	Huachipato	17	(2)
2001–2006	Brescia	18	(1)
2002–2003	→ Hellas Verona (loan)	20	(4)
2003–2004	→ Austria Salzburg (loan)	11	(0)
2004–2005	→ Ternana (loan)	31	(6)
2006	→ AlbinoLeffe (loan)	15	(2)
2006–2007	Foggia	33	(12)
2007–2008	Avellino	34	(10)
2008–2009	Foggia	38	(15)
2010	Torino	6	(1)
2011	Colo-Colo	5	(1)
2012	Deportes La Serena	7	(0)
2012–2015	Naval	57	(12)
2015	Coquimbo Unido	4	(0)
2016–2017	Naval	43	(15)
Total		339	(81)

International career
2001	Chile U20	3	(0)

Managerial career
- 2018: Deportes Quillón
- 2019: Independiente Cauquenes
- 2019: Corporación Lota
- 2021–2022: Lota Schwager
- 2023–2025: Universidad de Concepción (youth)
- 2025–: Deportes Concepción (assistant)
- * Club domestic league appearances and goals

Mario Antonio Salgado Jiménez (born 3 June 1981) is a Chilean retired footballer who played as a forward.

Salgado formerly played at Huachipato in Chile and then moved to Italy with Brescia Calcio and remained during several years at other clubs of Europe. In February 2011, the striker returned to his country for play in Colo-Colo.

== Club career ==
=== Brescia Calcio ===
Salgado joined Brescia Calcio from Huachipato in July 2001. He became the teammate of Roberto Baggio, an Italian historic footballer. His Serie A debut came on 16 September against Lecce, in a 1–1 draw.

With Brescia, Salgado scored 1 goal in 18 appearances. He later was loaned to Serie B side Hellas Verona in 2003, remaining one season there.

=== Extensive career at Italy ===
In July 2003, it was confirmed that Salgado moved to Austrian Football Bundesliga side SV Salzburg, one of the most recognized teams of Austria. However, he had a bad spell at Salzburg and was loaned to Ternana, where he was teammate of his countrymen Luis Jimenez, and shortly after was loaned to AlbinoLeffe in 2006. After his loan spell at AlbinoLeffe, his contract with Salzburg (now called Red Bull Salzburg) expired, was not renewed and was released of that team.

In the European summer winter of 2006, he was signed by Foggia of the Serie C1. In summer 2007, he joined to the recently promoted team to Serie B, Avellino in joint-ownership bid.

After his successful seasons at Avellino, he returned to Foggia, where he also had a good season, scoring 15 goals in 38 appearances. His good performances' for Foggia and Avellino attracted the attention of Torino and joined the Serie B club in a co-ownership deal. However, he had a regular season at Torino, only scoring 1 goal during 9 appearances (six games in Serie B and three in the promotion playoffs). On 3 January 2011, the club's directive terminated his contract.

=== Colo-Colo ===
In December 2010, Salgado moved to Primera A side Colo-Colo, on a one-year deal.

He made his debut in a 1–0 loss against Deportes La Serena for a pre-season friendly. The veteran striker of the Italian football, had a poor semester, and for this reason, he and his teammate Agustín Alayes were fired, but Salgado had a second opportunity in the most successful club of Chile, during the delay of the negotiations for release to Salgado of the club.

== International career ==
He capped for U-20 side in 2001 FIFA World Youth Championship in Argentina.

== Coaching career ==
He began his coaching career at the Tercera B, the fifth level of the Chilean football league system, with the clubs Deportes Quillón and Corporación Lota. For the 2019 season, he signed with Independiente de Cauquenes in the Segunda División Profesional de Chile, but he left the team in March 2019. In 2021, he joined Lota Schwager.

In August 2025, Salgado joined the technical staff of Patricio Almendra in Deportes Concepción as the assistant coach.
