= Andrea Sussi =

Professional footballer (born 1973)

Personal information
- Date of birth: 23 October 1973 (age 53)
- Place of birth: Florence, Italy
- Height: 1.76 m (5 ft 9 1/2 in)
- Position: Left back

Senior career*
Years	Team	Apps	(Gls)
1990–1993	Arezzo	30	(0)
1993–1995	Cesena	48	(1)
1995–1996	SPAL	36	(2)
1996–1998	Ascoli	53	(1)
1998	Perugia	1	(0)
1998–1999	Reggina	33	(1)
1999–2000	Perugia	7	(0)
2000	Salernitana	21	(0)
2000–2001	Genoa	16	(0)
2001–2002	Brescia	30	(1)
2002–2003	Ternana	28	(0)
2003–2004	Ancona	4	(0)
2004–2005	Bologna	44	(1)
2005–2006	Catanzaro	21	(0)
2006	Avellino	17	(0)
2006–2007	Perugia	17	(0)
2007	Arezzo	6	(0)
2007–2008	Olbia	26	(0)
2009–2010	Castelnuovese	?	(?)
2010–2011	Monteriggioni	?	(?)

Managerial career
- 2008–2009: Reggina (technical assistant)
- 2011–2012: Montecchio
- 2012–2013: Rassina
- 2013–2015: Arezzo U20 (youth)
- 2015–2016: Arezzo Academy (technical director)
- 2015–2016: Subbiano
- 2015–2016: Arezzo (assistant)
- 2021: Arezzo (U19)
- 2021–2022: Arezzo
- * Club domestic league appearances and goals

Andrea Sussi (born 23 October 1973) is an Italian professional football coach and former footballer who played as a left back.

== Playing career ==
Sussi played in Serie A, Serie B, Serie C1, and Serie C2, and represented 15 different clubs, all of which were Italian. Throughout his career he was coached by the likes of notable managers, such as Franco Scoglio, Carlo Mazzone and Antonio Conte, and also played with top footballers such as Pep Guardiola, Roberto Baggio, and Luca Toni during the 2001–02 season with Brescia Calcio.

== Coaching career ==
Following his retirement, in 2008 Sussi started his coaching career as a Technical Assistant in Reggina Calcio, Serie A, managed by Nevio Orlandi. In the following years Sussi gained experience as head coach in the 6th-7th Italian tier until he was offered a position as the youth coach at U.S. Arezzo, in charge of the Juniores Nazionale squad, which he formally accepted in July 2013. After a very good season, they achieved the play-off.

In 2014/2015 Sussi was the head coach of Berretti in U.S. Arezzo Lega Pro.

In 2015/2016 Sussi was the technical director of U.S. Arezzo FA Academy.

In 2016 Sussi was admitted to a Uefa A course in Coverciano and in July 2016 he became Uefa A Coach licensed.

In 2016-17 Sussi was the head coach of a local team Subbiano, this allowed him to follow the Uefa A course in Coverciano.

In the 2017–18 season Sussi joined Arezzo in Lega Pro with the role of assistant coach.

On 22 November 2021, he was promoted to the position of head coach at Arezzo (now in Serie D), he returned to the club earlier in the year to manage the Under-19 squad.

== Manager career ==
=== Transfers ===
Country	Club	From	To	Role
(Italy)	Arezzo	1 July 2017	30 June 2018	Assistant coach
(Italy)	Subbiano	1 July 2016	30 June 2017	Manager
(Italy)	Arezzo Academy	15 September 2015	30 June 2016	Technical director
(Italy)	Arezzo U20	1 July 2013	30 June 2015	Manager
(Italy)	Rassina	1 July 2012	30 June 2013	Manager
(Italy)	Montecchio	1 July 2011	30 June 2012	Manager
(Italy)	Reggina	1 July 2008	30 June 2009	Assistant manager
