= Raúl González (footballer, born 1976) =

Argentine footballer

Personal information
- Full name: Raúl Alberto González
- Date of birth: June 9, 1976 (age 50)
- Place of birth: Venado Tuerto, Argentina
- Height: 1.70 m (5 ft 7 in)
- Position: Striker

Senior career*
Years	Team	Apps	(Gls)
1997–2000	Atlético de Rafaela	63	(28)
2000–2001	Brescia	7	(0)
2002	→ F.C. Crotone (loan)	10	(1)
2002	→ Salernitana (loan)	10	(0)
2003	→ Cosenza (loan)	9	(0)
2003	Brescia	2	(0)
2004	A.C. Martina	12	(1)
2004–2005	Quilmes	6	(1)
2005–2007	Cagliese	50	(19)
2007–2008	U.S. Darfo Boario S.S.D.	7	(0)
- * Club domestic league appearances and goals

Raúl Alberto González (born 9 June 1976) is an Argentine footballer currently playing in Italy as a forward for the Serie D club U.S. Darfo Boario S.S.D.
