= Vittorio Mero =

Italian footballer

Personal information
- Full name: Vittorio Mero
- Date of birth: 21 May 1974
- Place of birth: Vercelli, Italy
- Date of death: 23 January 2002 (aged 27)
- Place of death: Rovato, Italy
- Height: 1.83 m (6 ft 0 in)
- Position: Defender

Youth career
- 1990–1991: Belvedere

Senior career*
Years	Team	Apps	(Gls)
1991–1992	Casale	2	(0)
1992–1993	Parma	0	(0)
1993–1995	Crevalcore	56	(3)
1995–1998	Ravenna	85	(6)
1998–2002	Brescia	57	(2)
2001	→ Ternana (loan)	19	(2)
- * Club domestic league appearances and goals

Vittorio Mero (21 May 1974 – 23 January 2002) was an Italian footballer who played as a defender. He spent his whole career in Italy playing for lower and high division clubs such as A.S. Casale Calcio, Parma F.C., Crevalcore, Ravenna Calcio, Brescia Calcio and Ternana Calcio.

== Career ==
Born at Vercelli, he started his career with an amateur team, Belvedere in 1990–91, and made his debut at the professional level at the age of 17 for A.S. Casale Calcio. The following year Mero signed for Parma F.C., playing with the Primavera team before being sold to Crevalcore, with whom he won the Serie C2 league. In 1995, he was signed by Ravenna, team for which he played three seasons, obtaining a promotion to Serie B. He moved to Brescia in 1998, obtaining his first promotion to Serie A and making his European debut as team captain in the 2001 UEFA Intertoto Cup, in which Brescia reached the finals, eventually losing to Paris Saint-Germain. During his time there, he was nicknamed Sceriffo (Sheriff) by his coach Nedo Sonetti for his diligence and reliability.

== Death ==
Mero died on 23 January 2002, in a car accident in the A4 highway near Rovato. Brescia honoured him by retiring the #13 jersey.

== Honours ==
Crevalcore

- Serie C2/A: 1993–94

== See also ==
- Retired numbers in association football
