= Alejandro Correa =

Uruguayan footballer (born 1979)

Personal information
- Full name: Alejandro Adrián Correa Rodríguez
- Date of birth: October 26, 1979 (age 46)
- Place of birth: Montevideo, Uruguay
- Height: 1.83 m (6 ft 0 in)
- Position: Midfielder

Youth career
- 1999: Nacional

Senior career*
Years	Team	Apps	(Gls)
2000	Maldonado		
2000–2004	Brescia	12	(0)
2002	→ Fermana (loan)	7	(0)
2004	→ Martina (loan)	14	(2)
2004	Peñarol		
2005	Central Español		
2006	Tacuarembó		
2007–2008	Cerrito		
2009	Rocha		
2009	Cerro Largo		
2010	Glória		
2010	→ Hercílio Luz (loan)		
2011	Santa Cruz		
2011	Glória		
2011–	Hercílio Luz		

International career
1999	Uruguay U20		
- * Club domestic league appearances and goals

Alejandro Adrián Correa Rodríguez (born 26 October 1979 in Montevideo) is a former Uruguayan footballer. He last played as a midfielder for Brazilian side São Luiz.

After his club career in Italy, he moved back to his home-country, and played for Peñarol, scoring in the 2005 Copa Libertadores. He later also played for Tacuarembó in the 2006 Apertura, and for Cerrito in the 2007 Clausura.

At international level, he was capped for the Uruguay U20 team at 1999 FIFA World Youth Championship.
