= Andrés Yllana =

Argentine footballer

- Yllana in 2025

Personal information
- Full name: Andrés Roberto Yllana
- Date of birth: 30 July 1974 (age 52)
- Place of birth: Rawson, Argentina
- Height: 1.80 m (5 ft 11 in)
- Position: Midfielder

Team information
- Current team: Deportivo Cuenca (manager)

Youth career
- 1993: Germinal de Rawson

Senior career*
Years	Team	Apps	(Gls)
1993–1999	Gimnasia La Plata	142	(5)
1999–2002	Brescia	85	(9)
2002–2003	Verona	17	(2)
2004–2005	Gimnasia La Plata	29	(1)
2006–2007	Belgrano	17	(2)
2007–2008	Arsenal de Sarandí	2	(0)
2008	Nueva Chicago	3	(0)

Managerial career
- 2011: Aldosivi
- 2014–2015: Guillermo Brown
- 2016: Gimnasia La Plata (youth)
- 2018–2019: Unión San Felipe
- 2020: Tabor Sežana (assistant)
- 2020–2021: Maribor (assistant)
- 2021: Villa San Carlos
- 2022: Guillermo Brown
- 2023: San Martín de San Juan
- 2023: Deportivo Madryn
- 2024–2025: Aldosivi
- 2025: Colón
- 2026: San Martín de Tucumán
- 2026–: Deportivo Cuenca
- * Club domestic league appearances and goals

Andrés Roberto Yllana (born 30 July 1974) is an Argentine football coach and former player who played as a midfielder. He is the current manager of Ecuadorian club Deportivo Cuenca.

== Playing career ==
Yllana started his professional career as a midfielder with Gimnasia de La Plata in 1993, he played over 100 games for the club before moving to Italy where he played for Brescia and Verona.

In 2004 Yllana returned to Argentina and his old club Gimnasia de La Plata but left again in 2005 to join Belgrano de Córdoba at the end of the 2006–07 season Belgrano were relegated from the Primera and Yllana moved on to join Arsenal de Sarandí. Playing only two games for Arsenal, he moved on again for the 2008 Clausura championship, this time to Nueva Chicago.

== Coaching career ==
In 2020 Yllana became Mauro Camoranesi's assistant at Slovenian PrvaLiga club NK Tabor Sežana. He successively followed Camoranesi at NK Maribor. He was dismissed by Maribor together with Camoranesi and his entire coaching staff on 23 February 2021.

== Honours ==
=== Player ===
Arsenal de Sarandí

- Copa Sudamericana: 2007
