= Poland Olympic football team =

National U-23 association football team

Poland Olympic
- Nickname(s): Biało-czerwoni ("The white and reds"); Białe Orły ("The White Eagles")
- Association: Polish Football Association (Polski Związek Piłki Nożnej)
- FIFA code: POL
First colours	Second colours

Summer Olympics
- Appearances: 1 (first in 1992)
- Best result: Silver medal, 1992

Olympic medal record
Silver medal – second place	1992 Barcelona	Team

The Poland national under-23 football team or Poland Olympic football team is the national under-23 football team of Poland and is controlled by the Polish Football Association.

== Summer Olympics record ==
Gold medalists Silver medalists Bronze medalists

Since 1992, the Olympic team must consist out of under-23 players plus three overage players.

Poland has qualified for only one Olympic competition at 1992, the inaugural edition of the under-23 team, where the team finished second after losing to host Spain in the final. Poland's qualification to Olympics can be decided from the performance of Poland U-21 in the UEFA European Under-21 Championship which served as the qualification stage to the Olympics.

The team has been often coached by the U-21 manager.

Summer Olympics										Qualification						
Year	Host	Round	Pld	W	D	L	F	A	Squad	Pos.	Pld	W	D	L	F	A
1920 to 1988		See Poland national football team								See Poland national football team						
1992	Spain	Silver medal	6	4	1	1	17	6	Squad	See Poland national under-21 football team						
1996	United States	Did not qualify								See Poland national under-21 football team						
2000	Australia	Did not qualify								See Poland national under-21 football team						
2004	Greece	Did not qualify								See Poland national under-21 football team						
2008	China	Did not qualify								See Poland national under-21 football team						
2012	United Kingdom	Did not qualify								See Poland national under-21 football team						
2016	Brazil	Did not qualify								See Poland national under-21 football team						
2024	Japan	Did not qualify								See Poland national under-21 football team						
2024	France	Did not qualify								See Poland national under-21 football team						
2028	United States	To be determined								See Poland national under-21 football team						
Total		Silver medal	6	4	1	1	17	6	—							
