= 2004 UEFA European Under-19 Championship =

2004 UEFA Under-19 Championship
U-19-Fußball-Europameisterschaft 2004 Championnat d'Europe de football des moins de 19 ans 2004 Campionato europeo di calcio

Tournament details
- Host country: Switzerland
- Dates: 13–24 July
- Teams: 8 (from 1 confederation)
- Venues: 5 (in 5 host cities)

Final positions
- Champions: Spain (5th title)
- Runners-up: Turkey

Tournament statistics
- Matches played: 15
- Goals scored: 45 (3 per match)
- Top scorer(s): (Turkey) Ali Öztürk (Poland) Łukasz Piszczek (4 goals each)
- Best player: (Spain) Juanfran

The 2004 UEFA European Under-19 Championship was held in Switzerland from 13 to 24 July 2004. Players born after 1 January 1985 can participate in this competition. The tournament was won by Spain, who beat Turkey in the final. It also served as the European qualification for the 2005 FIFA World Youth Championship.

== Venues ==
Kriens	Aarau	Fribourg
Stadion Kleinfeld	Stadion Brügglifeld	Stade Universitaire Saint-Léonard
Capacity: 5,100	Capacity: 9,249	Capacity: 9,000
2004 UEFA European Under-19 Championship is located in Switzerland
Nyon	Lausanne	
Colovray	Juan-Antonio Samaranch Stadium	
Capacity: 7,200	Capacity: ?	

== Qualifications ==
There were two separate rounds of qualifications held before the Final Tournament.

1. 2004 UEFA European Under-19 Championship first qualifying round
2. 2004 UEFA European Under-19 Championship second qualifying round

== Teams ==
The eight teams that participated in the final tournament were:

- Belgium
- Germany
- Italy
- Poland
- Spain
- Switzerland (host)
- Turkey
- Ukraine

== Match officials ==
Six referees were selected for the tournament:

- (Austria) Gerald Lehner
- (Georgia (country)) Levan Paniashvili
- (Hungary) Zsolt Szabó
- (Israel) Alon Yefet
- (Portugal) Pedro Proença
- (Scotland) Douglas McDonald

== Group stage ==
=== Group A ===
Teams	Pld	W	D	L	GF	GA	GD	Pts
Switzerland	3	1	2	0	3	1	+2	5
Ukraine	3	1	2	0	1	0	+1	5
Italy	3	1	1	1	5	2	+3	4
Belgium	3	0	1	2	0	6	−6	1

13 July 2004
19:00 CET

Belgium	0–0	Ukraine
	Report

Stadion Kleinfeld, Kriens
Referee: Douglas McDonald (Scotland)
13 July 2004
19:00 CET

Switzerland	1–1	Italy
Salatić 72'	Report	Alberti 45'

Stadion Brügglifeld, Aarau
Referee: Pedro Proença (Portugal)

15 July 2004
19:00 CET

Italy	0–1	Ukraine
	Report	Milevskyi 61'

Stadion Kleinfeld, Kriens
Referee: Gerald Lehner (Austria)
15 July 2004
20:00 CET

Switzerland	2–0	Belgium
Antić 38'; Bühler 78'	Report

Stadion Brügglifeld, Aarau
Referee: Levan Paniashvili (Georgia)

18 July 2004
20:00 CET

Ukraine	0–0	Switzerland
	Report

Stadion Kleinfeld, Kriens
Referee: Zsolt Szabó (Hungary)
18 July 2004
20:00 CET

Italy	4–0	Belgium
Alberti 28', 50'; Montolivo 48'; Sorrentino 84'	Report

Stadion Brügglifeld, Aarau
Referee: Alon Yefet (Israel)

=== Group B ===
Teams	Pld	W	D	L	GF	GA	GD	Pts
Spain	3	3	0	0	10	3	+7	9
Turkey	3	1	1	1	7	7	0	4
Germany	3	1	1	1	4	5	−1	4
Poland	3	0	0	3	5	11	−6	0

13 July 2004
18:00 CET

Germany	0–3	Spain
	Report	Víctor 51'; Gavilán 73'; Soldado 88'

Stade Universitaire Saint-Léonard, Fribourg
Referee: Zsolt Szabó (Hungary)
13 July 2004
19:00 CET

Poland	3–4	Turkey
Piszczek 43', 88'; Madera 75'	Report	A. Öztürk 26', 68', 83'; Adın 42'

Juan-Antonio Samaranch Stadium, Lausanne
Referee: Alon Yefet (Israel)

15 July 2004
18:00 CET

Germany	3–1	Poland
Gómez 18'; Dejagah 76'; Thomik 87'	Report	Piszczek 8'

Stade Universitaire Saint-Léonard, Fribourg
Referee: Pedro Proença (Portugal)
15 July 2004
19:00 CET

Spain	3–2	Turkey
Juanfran 8'; Silva 13'; Robusté 90+3'	Report	A. Öztürk 45' (pen.); Aksu 87'

Juan-Antonio Samaranch Stadium, Lausanne
Referee: Douglas McDonald (Scotland)

18 July 2004
19:00 CET

Turkey	1–1	Germany
Adın 90'	Report	Dejagah 90+1'

Stade Universitaire Saint-Léonard, Fribourg
Referee: Levan Paniashvili (Georgia)
18 July 2004
18:00 CET

Spain	4–1	Poland
Valero 10'; Víctor 14'; Gavilán 62'; Soldado 84'	Report	Piszczek 47'

Juan-Antonio Samaranch Stadium, Lausanne
Referee: Gerald Lehner (Austria)

== Knockout stage ==
=== Bracket ===
Round 1
21 July – Fribourg
Switzerland	2
Turkey (aet)	3
21 July – Lausanne
Spain (pen)	2 (4)
Ukraine	2 (1)

Round 2
24 July – Nyon
Turkey	0
Spain	1

=== Semi-finals ===
21 July 2004
18:00 CET

Switzerland	2–3 (a.e.t.)	Turkey
Antić 56'; Dugić 109'	Report	S. Öztürk 58', 95'; Kerim 107'

Stade Universitaire Saint-Léonard, Fribourg
Attendance: 9800
Referee: Gerald Lehner (Austria)

21 July 2004
18:00 CET

Spain	2–2 (a.e.t.)	Ukraine
Víctor 12'; Soldado 94'	Report	Aliyev 66'; Yatsenko 112'
Penalties
Silva (penalty scored); Soldado (penalty scored); Ramos (penalty scored); De la Red (penalty scored)	4–1	(penalty missed) Chyhrynskyi; (penalty missed) Kravchenko; (penalty scored) Vorobey

Juan-Antonio Samaranch Stadium, Lausanne
Attendance: 1520
Referee: Zsolt Szabó (Hungary)

=== Final ===
24 July 2004
18:00 CET

Turkey	0–1	Spain
	Report	Valero 90+2'

Centre sportif de Colovray Nyon, Nyon
Attendance: 4800
Referee: Pedro Proença (Portugal)

2004 UEFA U-19 European champions

Spain
Fifth title

== Qualification to World Youth Championship ==
The six best performing teams qualified for the 2005 FIFA World Youth Championship, along with host Netherlands.

- Germany
- Italy
- Spain
- Switzerland
- Turkey
- Ukraine

== See also ==
- 2004 UEFA European Under-19 Championship first qualifying round
- 2004 UEFA European Under-19 Championship second qualifying round
