= Andrea Alberti =

Italian footballer (born 1985)

Personal information
- Date of birth: 15 January 1985 (age 41)
- Place of birth: Desenzano del Garda, Italy
- Height: 1.85 m (6 ft 1 in)
- Position: Striker

Team information
- Current team: Orceana

Senior career*
Years	Team	Apps	(Gls)
2000-2002	Voluntas Brescia	19	(0)
2002–2008	Brescia	5	(0)
2004	→ Cesena (loan)	5	(0)
2005	→ Sambenedettese (loan)	20	(4)
2007–2008	→ Virtus Lanciano (loan)	16	(0)
2008–2011	Monza	17	(4)
2011–2012	Prato	1	(0)
2013	Mantova		
2013	Sambonifacese		
2014–	Orceana		

International career
2001	Italy U-15	1	(0)
2001	Italy U-17	2	(2)
2003	Italy U-18	2	(1)
2003–2004	Italy U-19	13	(9)
2004–2005	Italy U-20	4	(1)
- * Club domestic league appearances and goals as of 14:09, 3 May 2010 (UTC)

Andrea Alberti (born 15 January 1985 in Desenzano del Garda) is a professional Italian football player who plays as a forward for Orceana.

== Club career ==
=== Early career ===
Alberti played three games in Serie A for Brescia Calcio during the 2002–03 season.

=== Italian football scandal ===
On 18 June 2012, Alberti was banned for 3-years and 6-months due to 2011–12 Italian football scandal. His appeal was accepted by Tribunale Nazionale di Arbitrato per lo Sport (TNAS) of CONI in December 2012, which Alberti's ban was canceled.

=== Mantova ===
On 7 June 2013 Alberti was signed by Mantova F.C. He was released on 5 December.

== International career ==
Alberti represented Italy U–19 at the 2004 UEFA European Under-19 Football Championship.
