= Sergio Ramos =

Spanish footballer (born 1986)

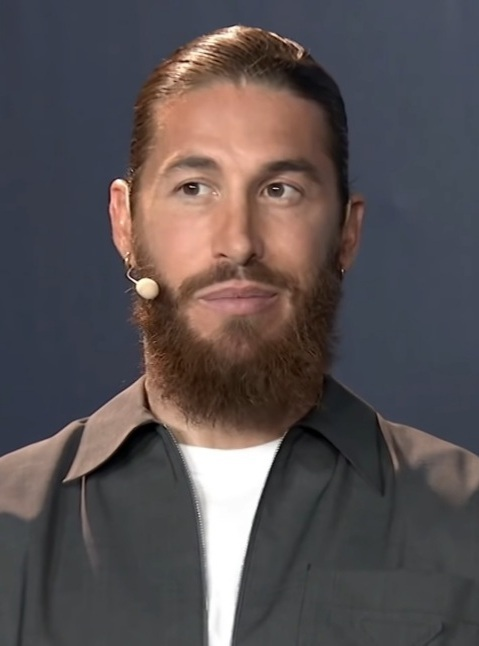
- Ramos in 2021

Personal information
- Full name: Sergio Ramos García
- Date of birth: 30 March 1986 (age 40)
- Place of birth: Camas, Spain
- Height: 1.84 m (6 ft 0 in)
- Position: Centre-back

Youth career
- 1992–1996: Camas
- 1996–2003: Sevilla

Senior career*
Years	Team	Apps	(Gls)
2003–2004	Sevilla Atlético	26	(2)
2004–2005	Sevilla	39	(2)
2005–2021	Real Madrid	469	(72)
2021–2023	Paris Saint-Germain	45	(4)
2023–2024	Sevilla	28	(3)
2025	Monterrey	27	(6)

International career
2002	Spain U16	1	(0)
2003	Spain U17	1	(0)
2004	Spain U19	7	(0)
2004	Spain U21	6	(0)
2005–2021	Spain	180	(23)
Medal record
Men's football
Representing Spain
FIFA World Cup
Winner	2010 South Africa
UEFA European Championship
Winner	2008 Austria-Switzerland
Winner	2012 Poland-Ukraine
UEFA European Under-19 Championship
Winner	2004 Switzerland
FIFA Confederations Cup
Runner-up	2013 Brazil
Third place	2009 South Africa
- * Club domestic league appearances and goals as of 03:10, 7 December 2025 (UTC)

Sergio Ramos García (Spanish pronunciation: [ˈseɾxjo ˈramos ɣaɾˈθi.a]; (Note: In isolation, Ramos and García are pronounced [ˈramos] and [ɡaɾˈθi.a] respectively.) born 30 March 1986) is a Spanish professional footballer who plays as a centre-back. Widely regarded as one of the greatest centre-backs of all time, he is known for his aerial abilities, physicality, leadership, and goalscoring abilities, having scored more than 100 goals for Real Madrid. In addition, he is one of the few players to have made over 1,050 career appearances.

Born in Camas in the Spanish province of Seville, Ramos played in Sevilla's youth academy and spent two seasons with the senior team, before moving to Real Madrid in the summer of 2005. He went on to become a mainstay for the club, winning 22 major honours, including five La Liga titles and four UEFA Champions League titles. He was vital to all of the Champions League winning campaigns, as he was named in the competition's Team of the Season each time. Out of contract with Real Madrid, he signed for Ligue 1 club Paris Saint-Germain in July 2021, spending two seasons at the club and winning Ligue 1 twice, before returning to Sevilla for one season. After leaving Sevilla, Ramos joined Liga MX side Monterrey, where he captained the team and played in the inaugural edition of the expanded FIFA Club World Cup.

Internationally, Ramos represented Spain from 2005 to 2021, playing at four FIFA World Cups (winning the 2010 edition) and three UEFA European Championships (winning titles in 2008 and 2012). With 180 caps earned across sixteen years, he is the nation's record appearance holder.

== Club career ==
=== Sevilla ===
Born in Camas, province of Seville, Andalusia, Ramos started playing at Camas CF by age six, then he began his career at local side Sevilla, emerging through the club's youth system alongside Jesús Navas and Antonio Puerta. He made his first-team and La Liga debut on 1 February 2004, coming on as a 64th-minute substitute for Paco Gallardo in a 0–1 away loss against Deportivo La Coruña.

In the 2004–05 season, Ramos appeared in 41 games as Sevilla finished sixth and qualified to the 2005–06 UEFA Cup, scoring in home fixtures against Real Sociedad (2–1) and Real Madrid (2–2). In the 2004–05 UEFA Cup, he scored his first continental goal, heading to conclude a 2–0 win over Nacional at the Ramon Sánchez Pizjuán in the first round (4–1 aggregate).

=== Real Madrid ===
==== 2005–09: Record transfer and early days ====
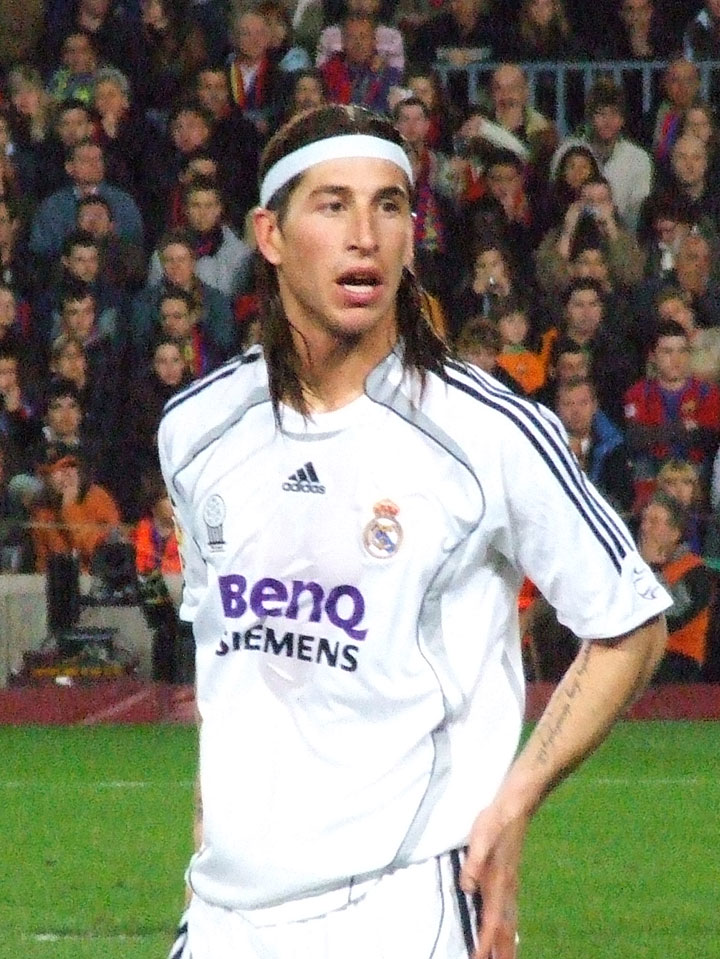
Ramos playing for Real Madrid against Barcelona in March 2007

In the summer of 2005, Ramos was purchased by Real Madrid for €27 million, a record for a Spanish defender. He was the only Spanish player brought in during Florentino Pérez's first stint as Real Madrid’s president.

At the club, Ramos was assigned the number 4 shirt, previously worn by Fernando Hierro. On 6 December 2005 he netted his first goal for the Meringues, in a 2–1 UEFA Champions League group stage loss at Olympiacos.

During his first seasons, Ramos played as centre back, being also used as an emergency defensive midfielder on occasion. However, with the arrival of Christoph Metzelder and Pepe in the 2007–08 season, he was again relocated to right back. In his first four seasons at Real Madrid, Ramos displayed a goalscoring instinct unusual to many defenders, netting more than 20 goals overall. He also received the first nine of his 24 red cards for the club, including four in his debut season. His first red card came after two bookable offences in a 1–0 away loss to Espanyol on 18 September 2005.

During the 2006–07 season, Ramos scored five goals, including one in a 3–3 El Clásico draw with Barcelona, as Real Madrid won a record 30th league title.

On 4 May 2008, he assisted Gonzalo Higuaín in the 89th minute against Osasuna in an eventual 2–1 away win, the match that sealed the club's 31st league championship. On the final day of the season, he scored twice in a 5–2 home win against already relegated Levante: one through a header, and another an individual effort; these goals taking his league tally for the 2007–08 season to five.

On 24 August 2008, Ramos scored in the 2008 Supercopa de España second leg against Valencia, making the score 2–1 in an eventual 4–2 and 6–5 aggregate win. The victory came despite Real Madrid playing with only nine men for a long period of time after Rafael van der Vaart and Ruud van Nistelrooy were sent off. Although Ramos experienced a slight dip in form during the early part of the 2008–09 season, he returned to his best and on 11 January 2009, scoring an acrobatic volley in a 3–0 triumph at Mallorca. He continued his scoring run the following week in a 3–1 home win against Osasuna.

Ramos was named in both FIFA and UEFA's 2008 Team of the Year, adding the FIFPro Team of the Year 2007–08 accolade. He also finished 21st in the European Player of the Year nomination for 2008.

==== 2009–14: Breakout and team mainstay ====
At the start of the 2009–10 season, Ramos was appointed as one of Real Madrid's four captains. Because Pepe had suffered a serious knee injury during this campaign, Ramos was often deployed as central defender. He scored four goals in 33 league matches; and, on 21 February 2010 he played his 200th official match for Los Blancos against Villarreal (150 in the first division). Despite these personal highlights, Real Madrid finished the campaign without picking up any silverware.

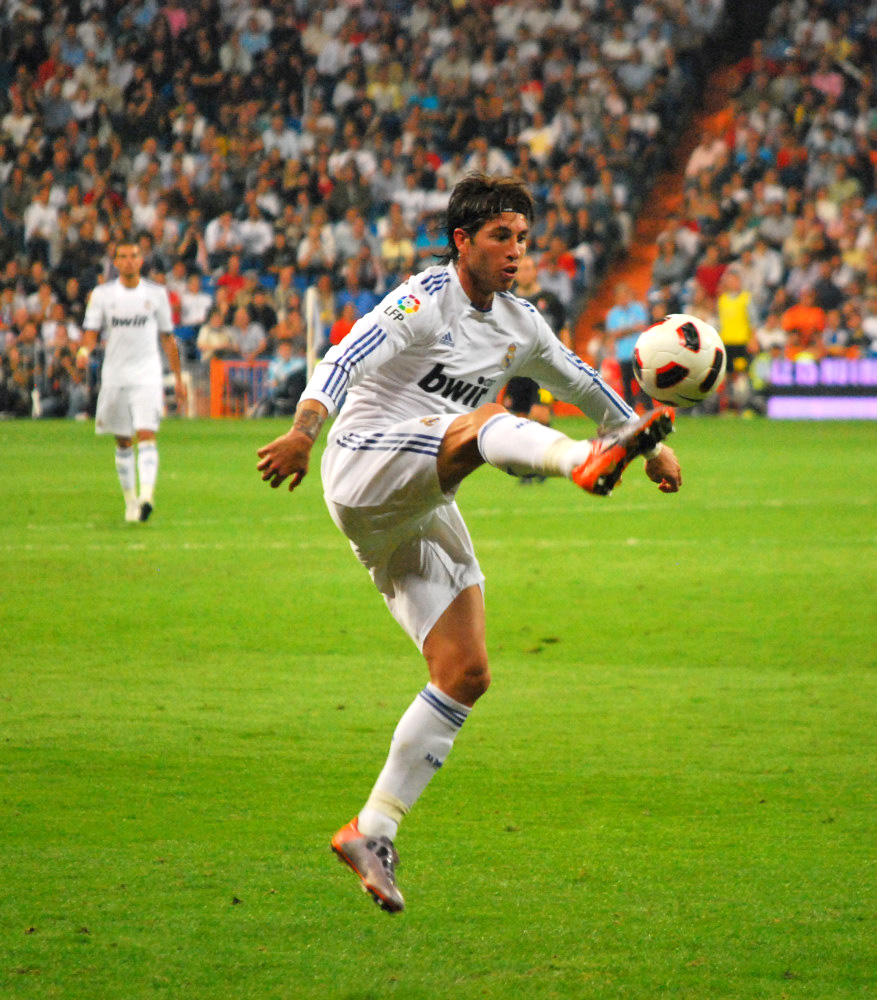
Ramos in action for Real Madrid in October 2010.

In Real Madrid's 5–0 loss at Barcelona on 29 November 2010, Ramos was sent off after kicking Lionel Messi from behind, then pushing Carles Puyol in the ensuing melée. After this ejection, he equalled Fernando Hierro's previous record of ten red cards at the club, despite having played in 264 fewer games. On 20 April 2011, Ramos started in the season's Copa del Rey final, a 1–0 win against Barcelona in Valencia. In the subsequent victory procession, while celebrating on the top of the club's bus, he accidentally lost hold of the cup, which fell under the wheels of the vehicle; the trophy was dented as a result.

On 12 July 2011, Ramos extended his contract with Real Madrid until 2017. The following 25 April, in the Champions League semi-finals' second leg against Bayern Munich, he missed his penalty shootout attempt as Real Madrid lost 3–1; the league campaign ended with them winning, with a record 100 points, after a four-year wait and he was the player with most balls recovered in his team, third overall.

On 9 January 2013, Ramos was sent off for a second bookable offense midway through the second half of an eventual 4–0 home win over Celta Vigo in the 2012–13 Copa del Rey. He subsequently received a four-match suspension, after it was revealed he also insulted referee Miguel Ángel Ayza Gámez. The following month, mere minutes after scoring the second goal at home against Rayo Vallecano and less than 20 minutes into the first half, he received two yellow cards within one minute in the eventual 2–0 home success, taking his red card tally with Real Madrid alone to 16; and 12 in the league.

In late February/early March 2013, due to the absence of Iker Casillas due to injury, Ramos captained Real to back-to-back wins over Barcelona in just four days: he netted the 2–1 home winner in the second game, heading home after a corner kick.

==== 2013–14: Red card record and La Décima ====
On 14 December 2013, Ramos received a club record 18th red card for Real Madrid in a 2–2 draw at Osasuna, but the suspension was later lifted.

His 19th red card came in a 4–3 home defeat to Barcelona, on 23 March 2014. On 26 April, Ramos scored a header against Osasuna in La Liga at the Bernabéu, in a counter-attack which he began with a strong tackle. It was his first goal in La Liga in six months, since his volley against Levante on match-day 8. On 29 April 2014, Ramos scored two headers in four minutes in a 4–0 away win against Bayern Munich in the semi-finals of the Champions League, with the tie ending with a 5–0 aggregate score and Madrid's qualification to the final for the first time in twelve years. Ramos's brace against Bayern (4 minutes) was the fastest brace in UEFA Champions League semi-final history at the time.

On 4 May, Ramos scored in the 2–2 draw with Valencia at home in La Liga with another header, scoring in back-to-back league games. Three days later, Ramos scored his first free-kick for a 1–1 draw away to Valladolid, having scored in three consecutive La Liga matches and scoring four consecutive matches for Real Madrid for the first time. On 24 May, in the Champions League final against Atlético Madrid, he headed home in the 93rd minute to tie the game 1–1, and Real Madrid went on to win 4–1 in extra-time to claim 'La Decima', their tenth trophy in the competition; he was also chosen by fans as Man of the match. Ramos ended 2013–14 with 7 goals, which made it his highest scoring season for Real Madrid at the time.

==== 2014–20: Sustained success and captaincy ====
Ramos started 2014–15 season on 12 August 2014 by playing the full 90 minutes in a 2–0 win against Sevilla to win their first trophy of the season, the UEFA Super Cup. He then played the two-legged Supercopa de España final against Atlético Madrid with Los Blancos losing 2–1 on aggregate. Ramos scored his first goal of the season on 31 August in week two of La Liga, a header in a 4–2 away loss against Real Sociedad. Ramos scored his 50th Real Madrid goal which came off his knee on 8 November against Rayo Vallecano at the Bernabéu in La Liga as Real Madrid won 5–1.

He scored in both the semi-final and the final of the 2014 FIFA Club World Cup and was voted the Player of the Match in both as Real Madrid won the tournament in Morocco. Ramos was also voted the player of the tournament, winning the Golden Ball.

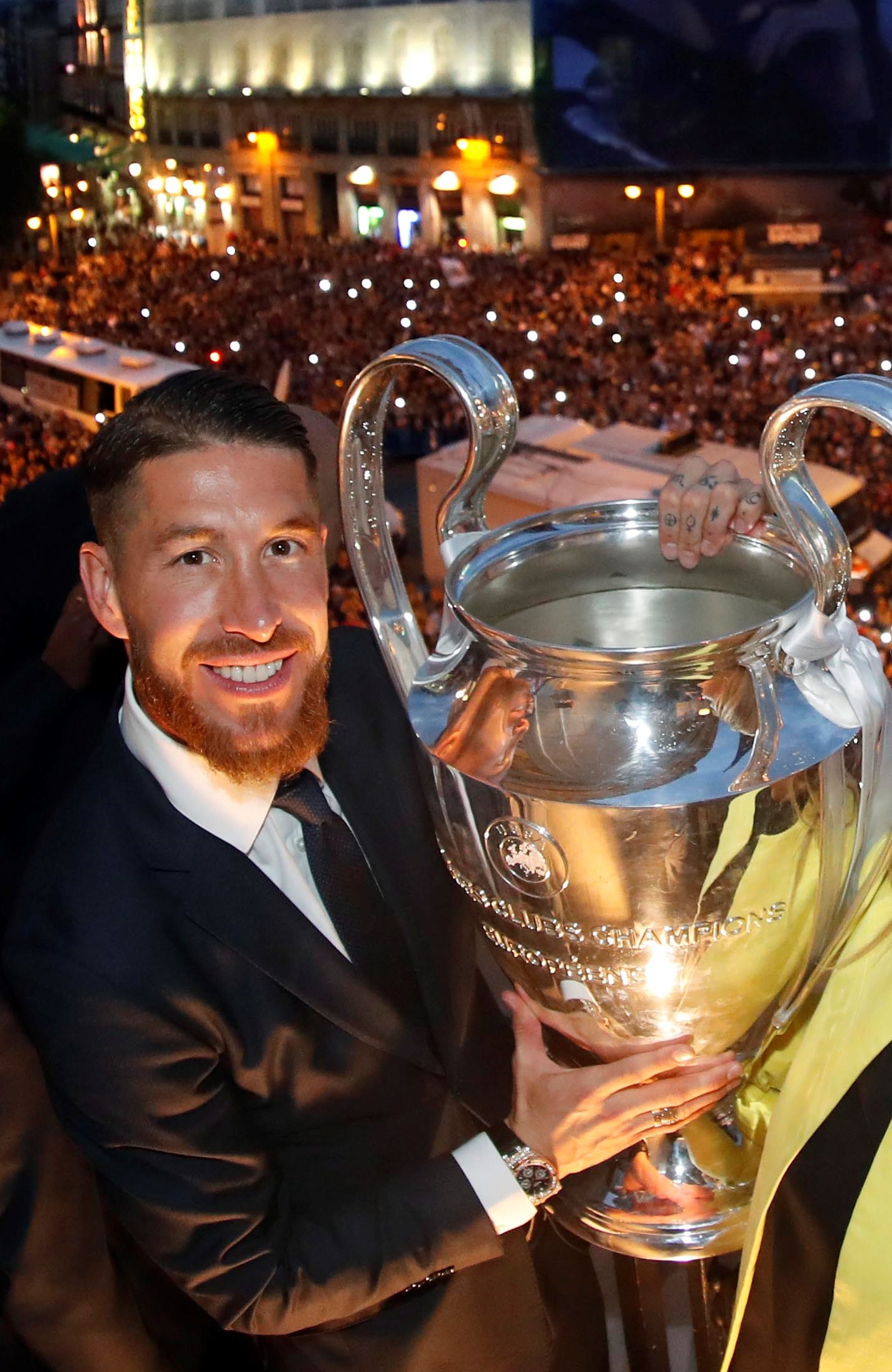
Ramos posing with the Champions League trophy at Puerta del Sol, after the 2015–16 season

Ramos agreed a new five-year contract with Real Madrid in August 2015, tying him to the club until 2020. He was also made captain after the transfer of Casillas to Porto. On 8 November, Ramos scored his first goal of the season away to Sevilla. In scoring with an overhead kick he was forced to be substituted due to landing on his injured left shoulder.

On 20 December 2015, Ramos captained Madrid to a 10–2 victory over Rayo Vallecano, the club's highest scoring La Liga victory in 55 years. The following 13 March, he received his 20th red card for Real Madrid in a 2–1 win over Las Palmas, having earlier scored the game's opening goal with a header from an Isco corner kick. On 2 April 2016, he returned from suspension in a 2–1 victory against Barcelona at the Camp Nou, where he was again sent off, receiving his 21st red card and fourth in a Clásico fixture.

Real Madrid reached the 2016 UEFA Champions League Final, where they faced Atlético Madrid. Ramos once again scored in a final, putting Real ahead in the first half. At the time, he was just the fifth player to score in two different Champions League Finals after Raúl, Samuel Eto'o, Lionel Messi and Cristiano Ronaldo. After a second-half equalizer from Atlético, he then scored a penalty in the shoot-out which resulted in Real Madrid winning 5–3; thus, he lifted his first UEFA Champions League trophy as a captain. According to author Michael Cox, he also notably "tipped the balance of the game toward Real Madrid" by tripping Yannick Carrasco up and stopping a three-on-one counter in stoppage time, with 30 seconds remaining and the score 1–1. He was named man of the match by UEFA after the game. By winning the final, Real Madrid earned the right to play against the winners of the 2015–16 UEFA Europa League, Sevilla, in the 2016 UEFA Super Cup. Ramos ended the 2015–16 season with three goals in 33 games which was his lowest goal tally and the fewest matches he played in any season at Real Madrid till then, due to ongoing injuries.

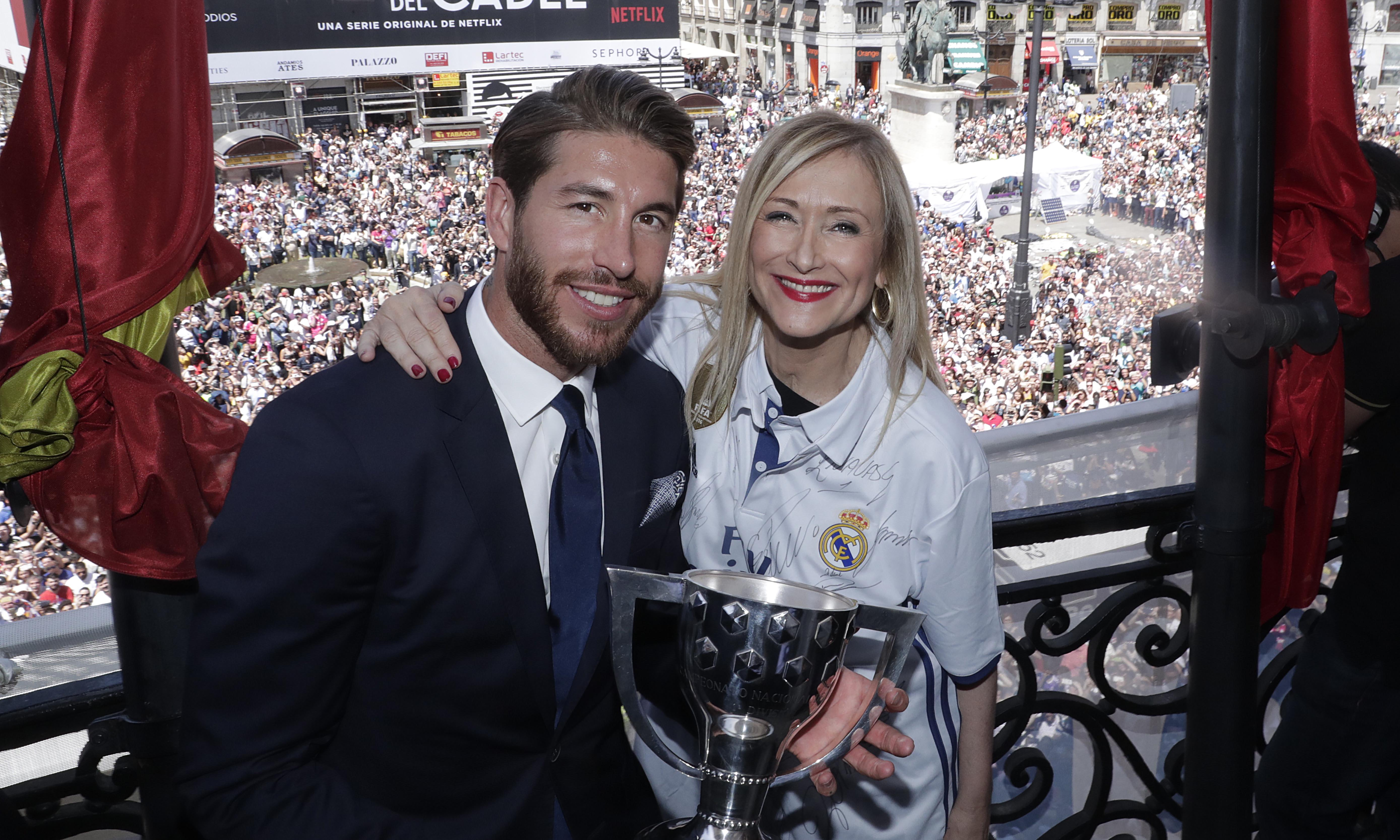
Ramos and Community of Madrid President Cristina Cifuentes with the 2016–17 La Liga trophy during celebrations in Madrid.

Ramos started in the 2016 UEFA Super Cup in Trondheim, scoring Real Madrid's equalizing second goal of the match in the 93rd minute, and hence bringing the game into extra-time. Real Madrid were the eventual 3–2 winners, with Ramos being named man of the match. On 3 December 2016, he scored his fourth Clásico goal, an equalizer against Barcelona in a 1–1 draw at the Camp Nou in the 90th minute, extending Madrid's unbeaten run to 33 games. One week later, he scored another late goal, this time in the 92nd minute, to help Madrid claim a 3–2 victory against Deportivo La Coruña.

On 15 January 2017, Ramos scored an own goal late in the game against Sevilla which levelled the scores at 1–1. Eventually Real Madrid lost the match 2–1 in stoppage time, thus ending their unbeaten streak at 40 matches. A week later, he scored both goals in a 2–1 win over Málaga, registering his 50th goal in La Liga. On 11 February, in a 3–1 victory against Osasuna, Ramos played his 500th match with the club. In the UEFA Champions League round of 16 second leg, Ramos scored an important equalizing header against Napoli in a 3–1 away win as Real Madrid qualified to the quarter-final after winning 6–2 on aggregate. On 12 March, Ramos scored another late header winner for Real Madrid, this time against Real Betis at the Santiago Bernabéu in a 2–1 win, taking his goal tally to 10 for the season – scoring double digit goals in a season for the first time in his career. Ramos's winner put Real Madrid back at the top of the La Liga table.

On 23 April 2017, Ramos was sent off for the 22nd time in his Real Madrid career and fifth time in an El Clásico, after a straight red card for a two-footed challenge on Lionel Messi during a Barcelona counter-attack in their 3–2 home defeat. Real Madrid won their 33rd La Liga title, giving Ramos his fourth league title overall and first as captain. They went on to win their first league and European Cup double since 1957–58 season, as the team defeated Juventus in the 2017 UEFA Champions League Final. This also made Ramos the first player to captain a team to back-to-back European Cups in the UEFA Champions League era. His ten goals in 2016–17 made it his then-highest scoring season.

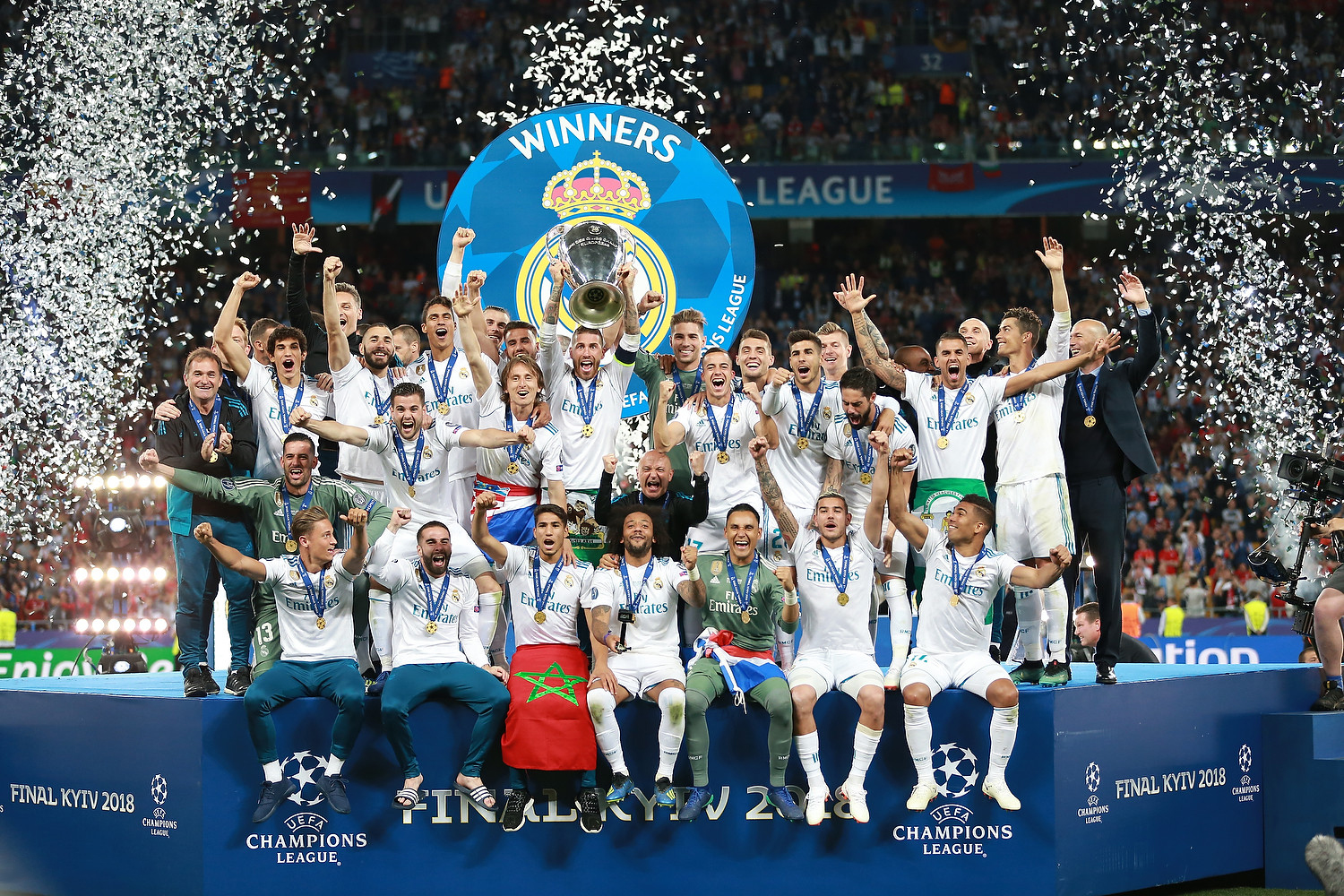
Ramos hoisting the European Champion Clubs' Cup as Real Madrid celebrate winning the UEFA Champions League, on 26 May 2018

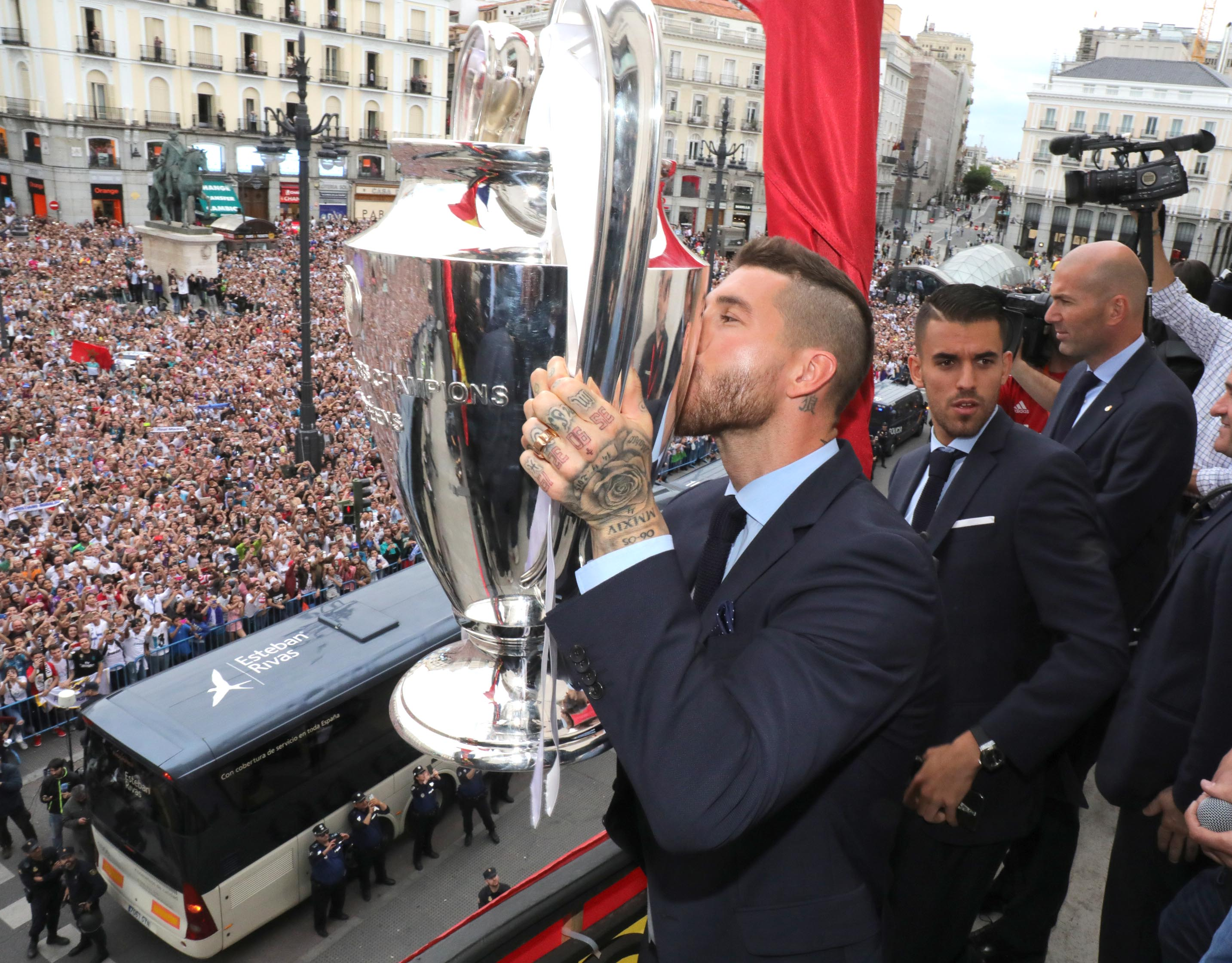
Ramos kissing the Champions League trophy during the 2018 title celebrations in Madrid.

On 20 August 2017, in Real Madrid's first game of the 2017–18 La Liga, he received his 23rd career red card. It was his 18th in La Liga, a joint highest record. He went on to break that record, seeing his 19th La Liga red in a 0–0 draw with Athletic Bilbao. Ramos scored his first goal of the season on 13 September in the Champions League, scoring a bicycle kick against APOEL on match-day 1. In La Liga, Ramos scored four goals, including two penalties – against Leganes and Sevilla. During the 2017–18 UEFA Champions League, he made eleven appearances, while scoring one goal, when Madrid won their third consecutive and 13th overall Champions League title. Ramos's performance in the final, however, was met with criticism; a challenge on Mohamed Salah resulted in the Egyptian dislocating his shoulder and missing the rest of the game, and he hit Liverpool keeper Loris Karius in the head with his elbow, the goalkeeper later being diagnosed with concussion. Ramos later denied that he intentionally hit Karius, saying that Virgil van Dijk pushed him into Karius. Ramos became the first player to captain a team to three consecutive Champions League triumphs, having now lifted the Champions League in every season as captain.

Ramos began the 2018–19 season scoring a penalty in an eventual 4–2 loss to Atlético Madrid in the 2018 UEFA Super Cup. Taking the penalty ensured Ramos would be the team's new penalty taker with the departure of Cristiano Ronaldo. On 26 August 2018, Ramos scored another penalty in Real Madrid's 4–1 away win against Girona, making him the only player along with Lionel Messi to score in each of the last 15 La Liga seasons. One week later, Ramos scored his third penalty of the season, against Leganes in a 4–1 win at the Santiago Bernabéu – his first goal at home since March 2017.

On 25 December 2018, Ramos played his 400th La Liga match for Real Madrid in a 2–1 loss at home to Levante, becoming only the tenth Real Madrid player to reach this milestone. After a run of poor results and the sacking of Julen Lopetegui, Ramos scored his first goal for Real Madrid in two months through a Panenka, against Real Valladolid in Santiago Solari's first 2018–19 La Liga game in charge of Los Blancos. Two weeks later, on 11 November, Ramos scored another Panenka against Celta Vigo – making them the 25th different team he scored against in La Liga. This was Ramos's third Panenka from his last four penalties, with the inventor of the penalty, Antonín Panenka, saying Ramos was the best 'imitator' of his penalty technique. With five goals in the first three months of the season, Ramos had his best goal-scoring start to a season at Real Madrid. In the 2018 FIFA Club World Cup, Ramos played in both Real Madrid's semi-final against Kashima Antlers and the final against Al Ain. Ramos scored a header in the final as Real Madrid won 3–1 to claim their third consecutive FIFA Club World Cup. Ramos became the first player to lift three consecutive FIFA Club World Cups while also becoming the first defender to score in two Club World Cup Finals.

On 9 January 2019, Ramos scored a penalty in the Copa del Rey game against Leganés, which was his 100th career goal, excluding two goals for Sevilla's reserve team. To celebrate the goal, Ramos chose to show the number 100 with his fingers. On 24 January, Ramos scored a brace against Girona in the Copa del Rey quarter-final first leg in a 4–2 home win. It was Ramos's fourth brace for Real Madrid and his first in the Copa del Rey. Three days later, Ramos scored his tenth goal of the campaign with a header against Espanyol in a 4–2 away win, which was also his 60th La Liga goal. With ten goals to his name, Ramos equalled his highest-scoring season at Real Madrid which he set in 2016–17.

On 6 February 2019, Sergio Ramos was playing in the Clásico for the 40th time. Three days later, in the Madrid Derby against Atlético Madrid, Ramos scored his eighth penalty of the season and his 11th goal in all competitions – making it his best goal-scoring season at Real Madrid. Four days later, in the 2–1 Champions League Round of 16 first leg away win over Ajax, Ramos became just the seventh player to play 600 matches for Real Madrid. In the match against Ajax, Ramos was booked for what seemed to be a needless challenge in the 90th minute. The booking meant that Ramos would miss the second leg against Ajax at the Santiago Bernabéu due a suspension of accumulating yellow cards. This sparked controversy after Ramos hinted to journalists in a post match interview that the yellow card was deliberate, which violates UEFA's rules. Two and a half weeks later, UEFA opened a disciplinary investigation regarding this matter and decided to give Ramos a two-game ban, meaning he will also miss both the Champions League Round of 16-second leg against Ajax and the quarter-final first leg were Real Madrid to qualify. Due to Real Madrid's elimination by Ajax, the suspension carried onto the next season and Ramos missed the first Champions League game of the 2019–20 season against Paris Saint-Germain.

On 17 February, Ramos played his 601st match for Real Madrid, against Girona in La Liga, equalling the record of Real Madrid legends Fernando Hierro and Paco Gento. Ten days later, Ramos played in his 41st El Clásico, in the Copa del Rey semi-final second leg at home. This was Ramos's 602nd match for Real Madrid, taking up to him fifth in Real Madrid's all-time appearances list. On 2 March, Ramos played in the La Liga El Clásico at the Bernabéu, making him equal the all-time record of Paco Gento, Manolo Sanchís and Xavi by playing in 42 Clasicos. On 5 March, Real Madrid were eliminated from the Champions League by Ajax after being thrashed 4–1 at the Santiago Bernabéu (aggregate 5–3 for Ajax). Ramos did not feature due to being suspended after forcing a yellow card in the first leg, thus facing criticism for doing so. Moreover, Ramos faced even more criticism as he was caught with a camera crew in the stands, filming for his new Amazon Prime documentary. Ramos took to his Twitter and Instagram accounts to discuss the controversy surrounding his actions, in which he admitted forcing the yellow card against Ajax in the first leg "was an error and I take the blame 200%". Regarding filming the documentary, Ramos claimed there were "certain commitments" made prior and he did not imagine the game would pan out as it did. Ramos picked up a calf injury at the start of April, which saw him miss the rest of the campaign and the final eight La Liga matches.

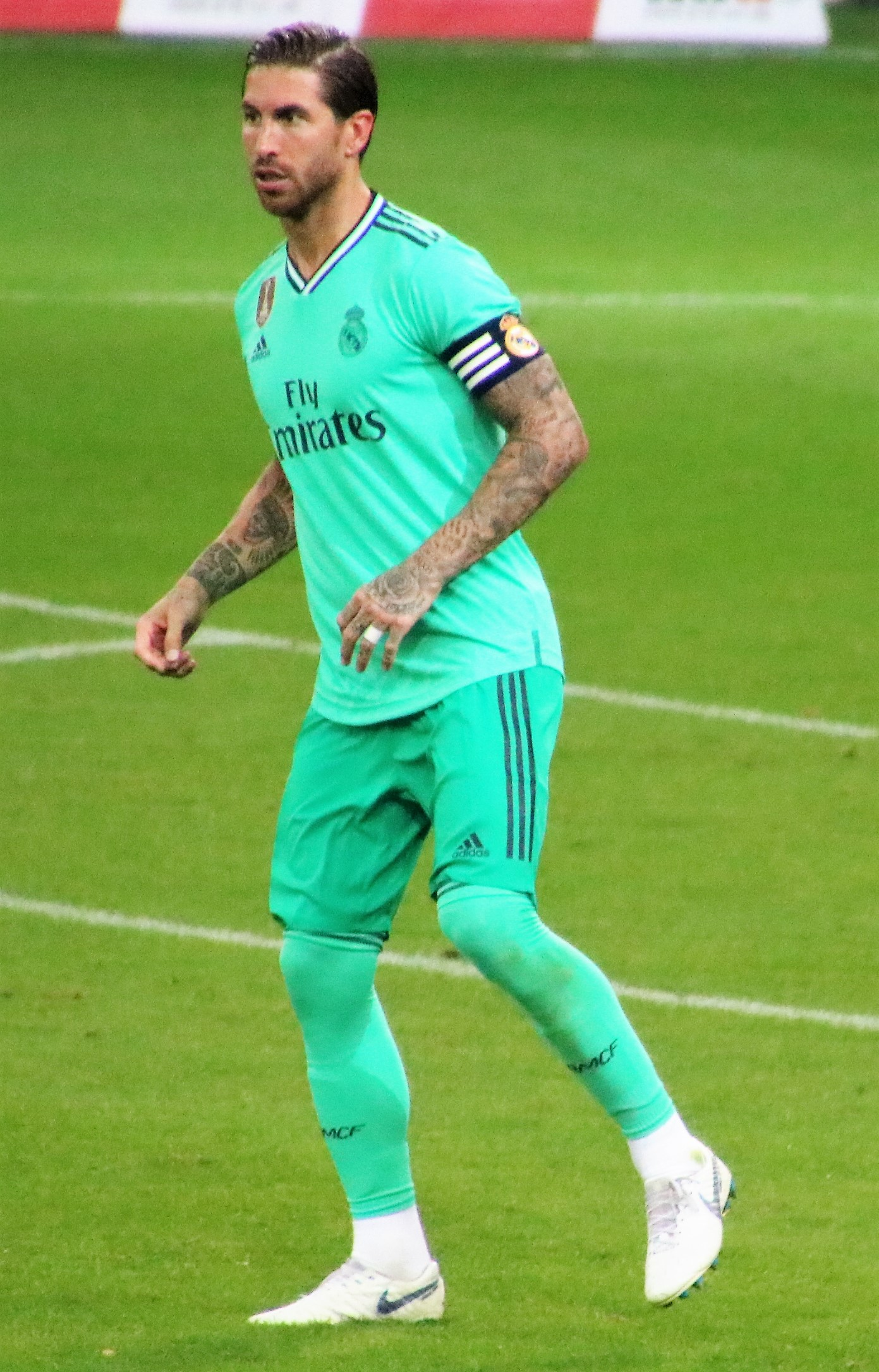
Ramos playing for Real Madrid in 2019

Ramos's first goal of the season was a header in his first Champions League match of the campaign, against Club Brugge on 1 October at home. The goal came at a vital time as Real Madrid were 2–0 down by half-time but were able to make a comeback after another header by Casemiro. This was also Ramos's first Champions League goal in two seasons. On 30 October, Ramos scored from the penalty-spot in a 5–0 home victory over Leganés, continuing his run of scoring in 16 straight La Liga seasons, again equalling Messi. One week later, on 6 November, Ramos scored his first penalty in the Champions League, which came against Galatasaray in a 6–0 home win. It was another 'Panenka' style penalty and also meant that Ramos scored in two Champions League group matches in the same season for the first time. On 18 December, Ramos played in his 43rd El Clasico, claiming the all-time appearance record for this historic fixture.

On 12 January 2020, Ramos scored the winning penalty in a shoot-out against Atletico Madrid in the Supercopa de España final in Jeddah as Real Madrid won 4–1 on penalties after a 0–0 draw after extra time. This was the first time in Ramos's career that he scored a winning penalty in a shoot-out. The 2020 Supercopa title was Ramos's 21st trophy with Real Madrid. A month later, Ramos scored another header in La Liga, this time away to Osasuna as Real Madrid won 4–1 to maintain top position in the table. Ramos's goal at El Sadar meant that he had scored in 20 different La Liga stadiums. This was Ramos's first La Liga goal of 2020, meaning he was the only player to score in La Liga in each of the last 17 calendar years – dating back to 2004.

On 26 February 2020, Ramos equalled the record of red cards received in the UEFA Champions League. With four red cards, he shares the unwanted record with Zlatan Ibrahimović and Edgar Davids. This dismissal came in a 2–1 home defeat to Manchester City in the Round of 16 first leg, for a tactical foul on City striker Gabriel Jesus. Four days later, Ramos featured in Real Madrid's 2–0 win over Barcelona at home in La Liga to leapfrog them into first place. This was Ramos's 21st consecutive Clasico in all competitions and his 30th in La Liga with Real Madrid.

When La Liga restarted after a three-month hiatus due to the COVID-19 pandemic, Ramos scored in Real Madrid's first game back against Eibar on 14 June at the Alfredo di Stéfano Stadium in a 3–1 win. He also scored the first goal at this stadium in its inaugural match in May 2006. Ramos's goal began with him winning the ball back from Eibar's attack a few meters outside Madrid's own penalty area and ran 70 meters across the pitch to find the pass from Eden Hazard to score his first La Liga goal from open play in over five years. On 21 June, Ramos scored a penalty for Real Madrid in their 2–1 win against Real Sociedad at the Anoeta, which was the 20th consecutive penalty he converted for club and country (including shoot-outs). Three days later, Ramos scored a free-kick against in a 2–0 win over Mallorca at the Alfredo di Stefano to become La Liga's all-time highest scoring defender with 68 goals, surpassing Ronald Koeman's 67 with Barcelona. Ramos's free-kick was also his eighth La Liga goal of the season, making it his most prolific league campaign to date and his tenth in all competitions – hitting double figures for a third season. On 28 June, Ramos featured in the 1–0 away league win against Espanyol, heading the ball down right outside the Espanyol penalty area to Karim Benzema who eventually assisted Casemiro to score the winner right before half-time. This was Ramos's 645th match for Madrid, moving him up to fourth in the club's all-time most appearances list joint with Santillana.

On 2 July 2020, Ramos scored his fifteenth consecutive penalty for Real Madrid in the 79th minute which proved to be the winner in a 1–0 home win against Getafe – opening up a four-point advantage at the top of La Liga. This was Ramos's ninth league goal of the season – equaling the record set by Argentine international defender Ezequiel Garay in 2006-07 while playing for Racing Santander for a defender with the most goals in a single La Liga season. The penalty against Getafe meant that Ramos had equalled his best goal scoring season (11 goals) which was set the previous season. Ramos had now scored in four out of six of Madrid's matches since the restart, more than any other player. Moreover, the goal was his 100th career club goal, and his 70th in La Liga. The win over Getafe was Ramos's 450th La Liga appearance as a Real Madrid player, becoming just the fifth player to reach this milestone. Three days later, he scored another penalty – his 22nd in a row, and his tenth goal of the season in La Liga – in a 1–0 away win over Athletic Bilbao. He also became the first centre-back to score 10 goals in a La Liga season since Fernando Hierro during the 1993–94 season. On 19 July, Ramos scored his eleventh league goal in Real Madrid's last La Liga game of the season against Leganes in an eventual 2–2 draw, making it his most prolific season in White with 13 goals across all competitions. At the end of the season, Ramos won his fifth league title with Los Blancos and Real Madrid's 34th overall.

==== 2020–21: Final season at Real Madrid ====
On 27 September 2020, Ramos opened his goal count for the season after netting the winning goal against Real Betis from the penalty spot at Benito Villamarín in a 3–2 league win. One month later on 24 October in El Clasico, Ramos earned and converted a penalty at the Camp Nou in a 3–1 league win – this was his 25th consecutive penalty goal for both club and country (including shoot-outs). Ramos's fifth El Clasico goal equaled the record of Ronald Koeman (who was in the other dugout as manager) as the defenders with the most goals in this historic fixture. This was also Ramos's 31st consecutive La Liga Clasico, meaning he has not missed one since joining Los Blancos in 2005 – equalling Raúl and Paco Gento as the players who played in the most league Clasicos. Three days later, Ramos played his first Champions League match of the season against Borussia Mönchengladbach, assisting Casemiro's 93rd minute equaliser in a 2–2 draw. This was Ramos's 16th Champions League campaign with Real Madrid, equalling the record of club legend, and former captain and teammate Iker Casillas. On 31 October, Ramos became just the tenth player to play 500 La Liga matches (461 for Real Madrid and 39 for Sevilla), as Madrid beat Huesca 4–1 at the Alfredo Di Stefano Stadium. On 3 November, Ramos scored his 100th goal for Real Madrid in all competitions, in a 3–2 win over Inter Milan in the Champions League.

On 14 January, Ramos reportedly took four pain killer injections to his left knee to play against Athletic Bilbao in the 2020–21 Supercopa de España semi-final which Real Madrid went on to lose 2–1. This was the last match Ramos would play before opting for a mid-season surgery for the first time in his career for a torn meniscus in his left knee. He was expected to be out for two months and to return in early April, but after a speedy recovery, Ramos started against Elche on 13 March – just over a month after he went under the knife. Real Madrid's 2–1 win over Elche was Ramos's 334th La Liga win (315 with Real Madrid and 19 with Sevilla), equalling the record of Iker Casillas as the players with second–most wins in the Spanish top flight – only behind Messi. Four days later, Ramos played in a Champions League round of 16-second leg for the first time in three years as Real Madrid went on to defeat Atalanta 3–1 at the Alfredo di Stefano (5–3 on aggregate) and qualified for the quarter-finals for the first time since their last Champions League winning campaign in 2018. Ramos scored his 19th consecutive penalty for Madrid in the 60th minute which killed the game, before coming off as a substitute. This was Ramos's 15th Champions League goal, equalling Gerard Piqué and former teammate Iván Helguera as the second highest scoring defenders in the history of the competition – with only former teammate Roberto Carlos ahead of them.

Due to an injury, Ramos missed his first El Clásico since joining Real Madrid, ending a streak of playing in 31 consecutive league Clásicos. He later missed the second leg of the Champions League quarter-finals against Liverpool, as he tested positive for COVID-19, although he was also injured. On 5 May, in the Champions League semi-final second leg against Chelsea, his side lost 2–0 and were eliminated from the competition; however, he then sustained an injury in his left hamstring which forced him to miss the rest of the season; this meant he had played his last game for Real Madrid. Ramos played just 21 matches for Los Blancos in 2020–21, making it his most injury-riddled season, after having played at least 33 matches in each of his previous 15 campaigns at the club.

On 16 June, Real Madrid announced that Ramos would leave the club at the end of the season. During his farewell event on the next day, Ramos, who had initially asked for a two-year offer, mentioned that he accepted a one-year contract renewal with a salary reduction; however, the offer had expired without his knowledge.

=== Paris Saint-Germain ===
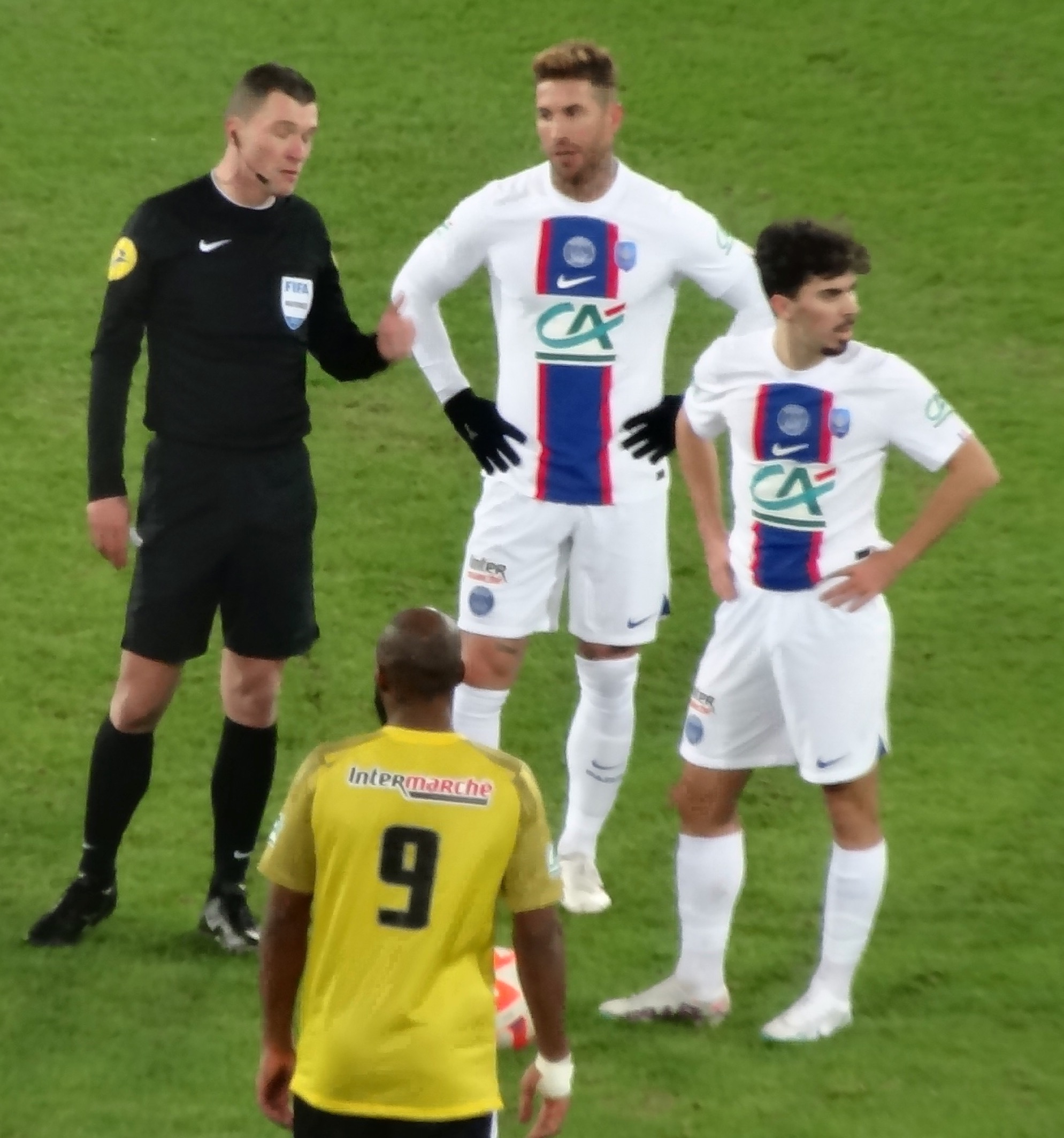
Ramos (centre, in white) playing for Paris Saint-Germain in 2023

==== 2021–22: Various injuries and Ligue 1 title ====
On 8 July 2021, it was announced that Ramos had signed a two-year contract with Paris Saint-Germain. He chose to wear the number 4 jersey, with Thilo Kehrer switching to the number 24 shirt. Ramos remarked: "I am quite superstitious about it and I love the number 4 because I have worn that number since the start of my career and it has followed me throughout my career and my life, bringing with me much luck and many victories". During the medical examination required to complete the signing, the medical staff at PSG were reported to be impressed by his seriousness and physique, whilst the medical results were noted to be excellent and incredible. The staff compared Ramos's physique to that of a 25-year-old (he was 35 at the time).

Due to a series of injury problems, Ramos made his first appearance in a match day squad for Paris Saint-Germain ahead of a Champions League group stage game against Manchester City on 24 November 2021. He made his debut four days later in a 3–1 league victory over Saint-Étienne. On 23 January 2022, Sergio scored his debut goal for the club, helping PSG to beat Reims 4–0 in a home league match. Ramos won the 2021–22 Ligue 1 in his first season at the club.

==== 2022–23: Last season at PSG ====
PSG started the 2022–23 season by winning the 2022 Trophée des Champions in Tel Aviv, in which Ramos scored a goal in a 4–0 win over Nantes. On 6 September 2022, he made his Champions League debut with Paris Saint-Germain in a 2–1 win over Juventus. On 8 February 2023, in a 1-2 defeat against Marseille in the Coupe de France, he score a header to become at 36 years and 315 days PSG’s oldest goalscorer ever. On 8 April 2023, he scored against Nice at 37 years and 9 days to become Paris Saint-Germain’s oldest Ligue 1 goalscorer. On 2 June 2023, Ramos announced that he would be leaving PSG at the end of the season, following the expiration of his contract on 30 June. One day later, he opened the score in a 2–3 defeat against Clermont in his last appearance for the club as Paris Saint-Germain won their record 11th Ligue 1 title.

=== Return to Sevilla ===
On 4 September 2023, Ramos returned to his boyhood club Sevilla after 18 years, signing a contract until the end of the season. On 17 September, he made his second debut for Sevilla in a 1–0 win over Las Palmas at the Ramón Sánchez Pizjuán Stadium. Three days later, he made his Champions League debut with Sevilla in a 1–1 draw against Lens. On 21 October, Ramos played against his former club Real Madrid for the first time since he left in 2021, in a La Liga match that ended in a 1–1 draw at the Ramón Sánchez Pizjuán Stadium, helping secure a point from the match.

On 26 November, he was involved in a notable and bizarre incident during a match against Real Sociedad, in which he received two red cards. He was initially shown a red card after receiving a second yellow card for a late challenge on Brais Méndez. Following this, he appealed for a VAR review, prompting the referee to examine the slow-motion footage. After reviewing the footage, the referee rescinded the second yellow card, and immediately issued Ramos a straight red card.

On 29 November, he scored his first goal for Sevilla following his return in a 3–2 home defeat against PSV Eindhoven in the Champions League, equaling the record of most goals scored by defenders set by Roberto Carlos and Gerard Piqué, which also marked the 10,000th goal in the competition. On 12 December, he broke the record, by scoring his 17th goal with a Panenka-style penalty in a 2–1 away defeat against Lens.

On 25 February 2024, Ramos returned to the Santiago Bernabéu to play against Real Madrid, following his departure from the club in 2021, as his team suffered a 1–0 defeat. Later that year, on 17 June, Sevilla announced that Ramos would not stay at the club for the following season.

=== Monterrey ===
On 6 February 2025, Ramos was announced as a new player for Liga MX side Monterrey, after various days of speculation. Ramos chose to wear number 93 instead of his traditional number 4 to honor his 93rd-minute equaliser in the 2014 UEFA Champions League final for Real Madrid. Ramos was handed the captain's armband on his debut for the club against Atlético San Luis. On 3 March, he scored his first goal for the club in a 4–2 victory over Santos Laguna.

On 17 March 2025, he was sent off for the 30th time in his career (first with Monterrey) after receiving a straight red card for kicking UNAM's striker Guillermo Martínez from behind after failing to steal the ball. Later that year, on 18 June, he scored the opening goal in a 1–1 draw against Inter Milan during the 2025 FIFA Club World Cup, being also named Man of the Match. In doing so at the age of 39 years and 80 days old, he became the oldest player in history to score in the Club World Cup, breaking the previous record set by Javier Zanetti in the 2010 edition at the age of 37. In December of that year, he announced his departure from the club following the conclusion of his contract, becoming a free agent.

== International career ==
=== 2002–2006: Youth level and early international career ===
In 2004, Ramos became an instant hit for Spain's under-19, for whom he played six international matches. During the 2004 U19 Euro, Ramos was a key figure for Spain as he started in four out of five of their matches on the way to winning their second U19 European Championship, including scoring a decisive penalty in the Semi-final penalty-shoot out against Ukraine. On 26 March 2005, in a 3–0 friendly win over China in Salamanca, he first appeared for the senior side at only 18 years and 361 days of age, making him the youngest player to play for the national team in the last 55 years. He held this record until 1 March 2006, when it was broken by Cesc Fàbregas in a friendly match against Ivory Coast.

On 12 October 2005, Ramos scored his first two international goals in a 6–0 away thrashing of San Marino for the 2006 FIFA World Cup qualifiers. He was selected for the final stages in Germany and, after the international retirement of Real Madrid teammate Míchel Salgado, became the undisputed first-choice right-back. Despite wearing the number 4 jersey for Real Madrid, Ramos admitted he wears the number 15 for Spain in memory of his close friend and former Sevilla teammate Puerta, who died in August 2007 and made his Spain debut wearing No. 15.

=== 2008–2012: Spain's Golden Generation ===
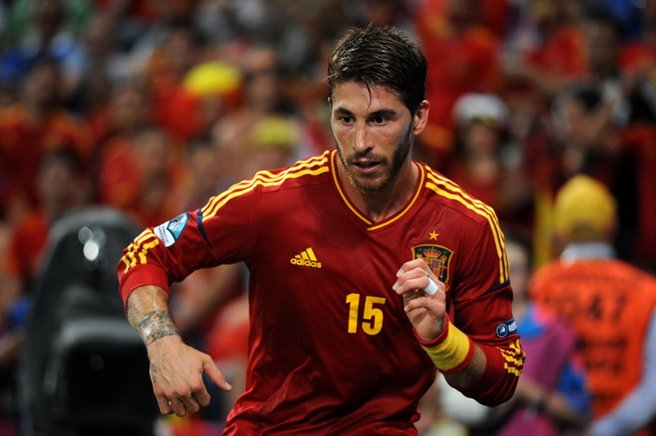
Ramos at the Euro 2012, in a quarter-final match against France.

Throughout Spain's UEFA Euro 2008 qualifying campaign, Ramos was a regular member of the starting eleven as the national side finished first in its group, above Sweden. He scored two goals, including one in a 3–1 away win over Denmark, in 11 appearances. In the tournament's final stages, Ramos played in all matches and minutes, except the 2–1 group stage win against Greece. In the final, his pass nearly set up Marcos Senna's first international goal, but the latter missed his opportunity by inches. During the celebrations after the 1–0 defeat of Germany, he wore a T-shirt in honour of his late friend Puerta.

Ramos was selected in the squad for the 2009 FIFA Confederations Cup in South Africa, as Spain finished in third. On 3 June 2010, he captained Spain for the first time, in a 1–0 friendly win over South Korea in Innsbruck, Austria.

At the 2010 World Cup, held in the same country, Ramos played every minute of the tournament as a right back, helping Spain keep five clean sheets and reach the final, which they won 1–0 against the Netherlands; he topped the tournament's Castrol Performance Index with a score of 9.79. Despite playing at right-back, he also completed more solo runs than any other player in the tournament, 31.

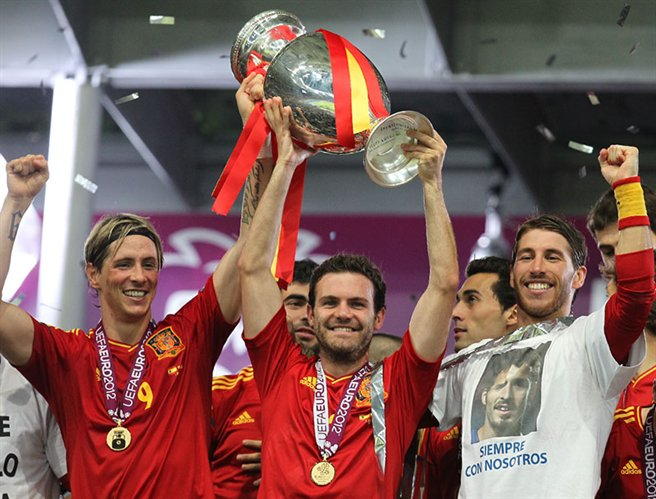
Fernando Torres (left), Juan Mata (centre), and Ramos (right) holding the Henri Delaunay Trophy after winning the UEFA Euro 2012.

Ramos returned to the heart of the defence for Euro 2012. When asked about his role change, he replied: "I have adapted and feel comfortable in the middle, but I am a World and European champion at right-back". He played all the games in Poland and Ukraine alongside Barcelona's Gerard Piqué and, in the semi-finals against Portugal, he converted his penalty shootout attempt in an eventual 4–2 win (0–0 after 120 minutes), scoring for the eventual champions in Panenka-style. On 1 July, Ramos won his third trophy with the Spanish senior National Team as they thrashed Italy 4–0 in the final. Ramos's performances during the Euro earned him a place in the Team of The Tournament. Ramos wore another T-shirt during Spain's Euro 2012 celebrations to pay homage to his late friend Puerta.

=== 2013–2019: Assuming the captaincy ===
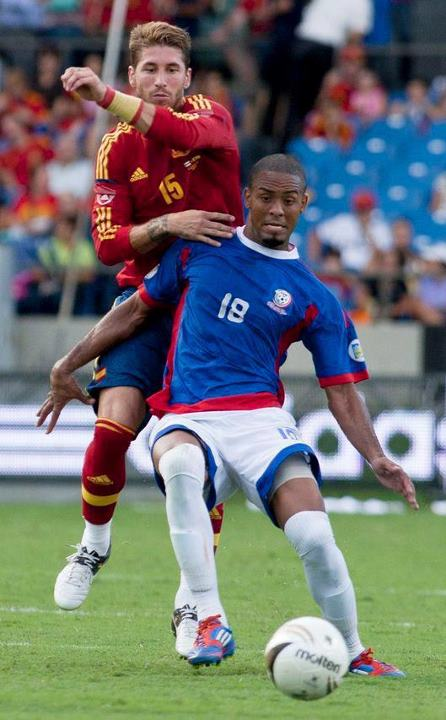
Ramos (in red) in action for Spain in a game against Puerto Rico.

On 22 March 2013, Ramos celebrated his 100th cap by opening the scoring in a 1–1 draw with Finland in Gijón for the 2014 World Cup qualifiers. He became the youngest European player ever to reach that figure in the process, surpassing Germany's Lukas Podolski. In June, Ramos contested in the 2013 FIFA Confederations Cup in Brazil, starting every match as Spain lost to the hosts in the final. He captained the side for their second group game, a 10–0 win over Tahiti at the Maracanã, which is the biggest win of his career. On 30 June, he missed a penalty kick in the 3–0 Confederations Cup Final loss to Brazil.

Ramos was selected for his third World Cup in 2014. He played the full 90 minutes of each of the team's matches in Brazil, each with a different partner in central defence, as the reigning champions were eliminated from the group stage.

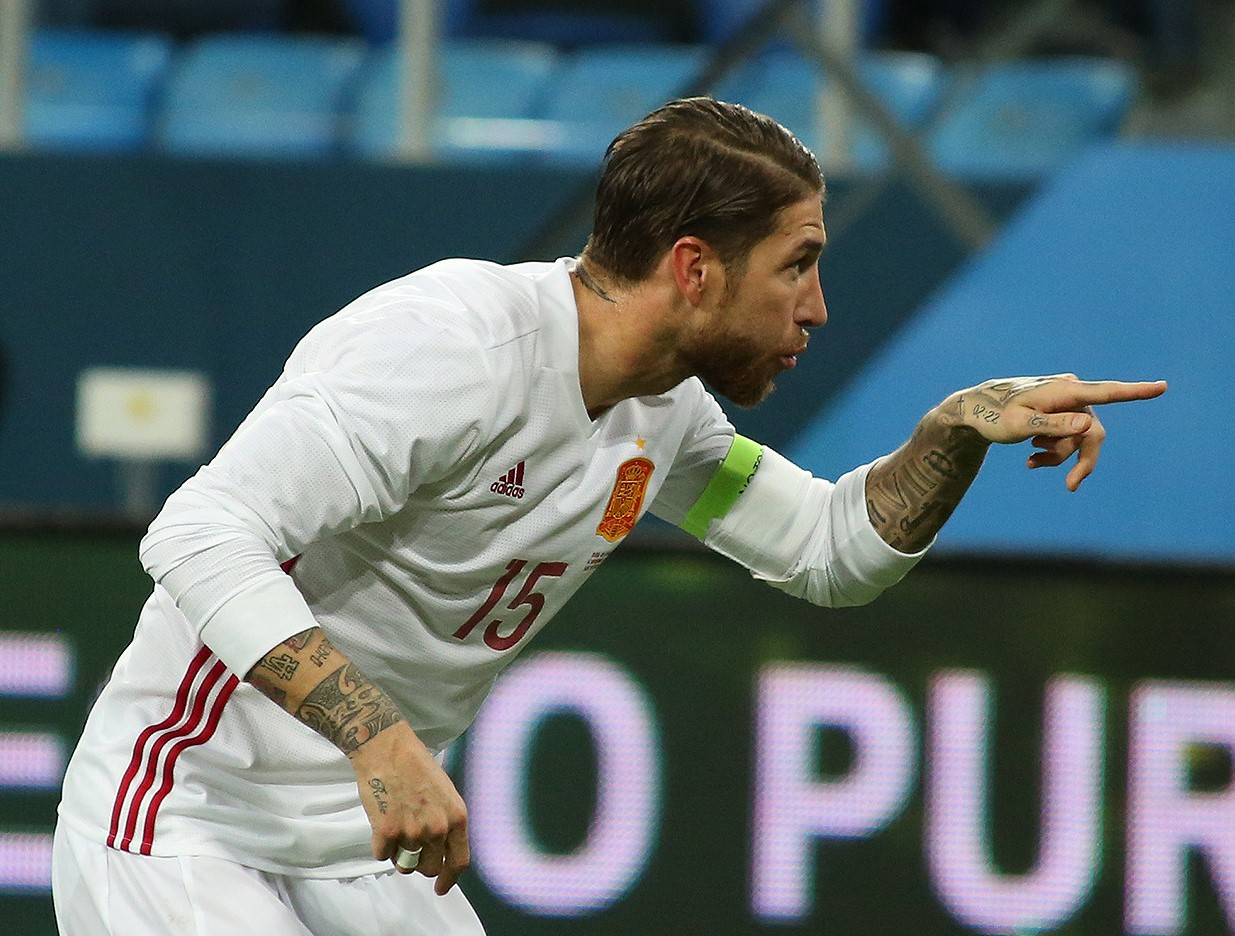
Ramos celebrates after scoring a goal against Russia in a friendly in Saint Petersburg.

In February 2016, Ramos won the Luis Aragonés Award by Marca, which distinguished him as the best player of the national team in the past year. With David de Gea selected ahead of Iker Casillas in Spain's starting line-up, Ramos captained the team at UEFA Euro 2016. On 21 June 2016, he had a penalty kick saved by Danijel Subašić in a 2–1 loss to Croatia. Spain finished their Euro group as runners-up and crashed out in the Round of 16 against Italy.

On 23 March 2018, days before turning 32, Ramos earned his 150th cap for Spain in a 1–1 friendly draw with Germany in Düsseldorf. Only Iker Casillas had previously reached the mark for the team.

Ramos was included in the Spain squad for the 2018 FIFA World Cup and would go into his fourth tournament, and first World Cup as Captain after Iker Casillas missed out. He played in all three of Spain's Group stage matches as they topped the 'Group of Death' ahead of European Champions Portugal. In the Round of 16 against Russia, Ramos believed he scored the opening goal but it was later credited as an Sergei Ignashevich own goal. The match ended 1–1 after extra time and was decided on penalties (4–3) as the hosts eliminated La Roja. Ramos scored Spain's fourth penalty but it wasn't enough as teammates Koke and Aspas both had their penalties saved.

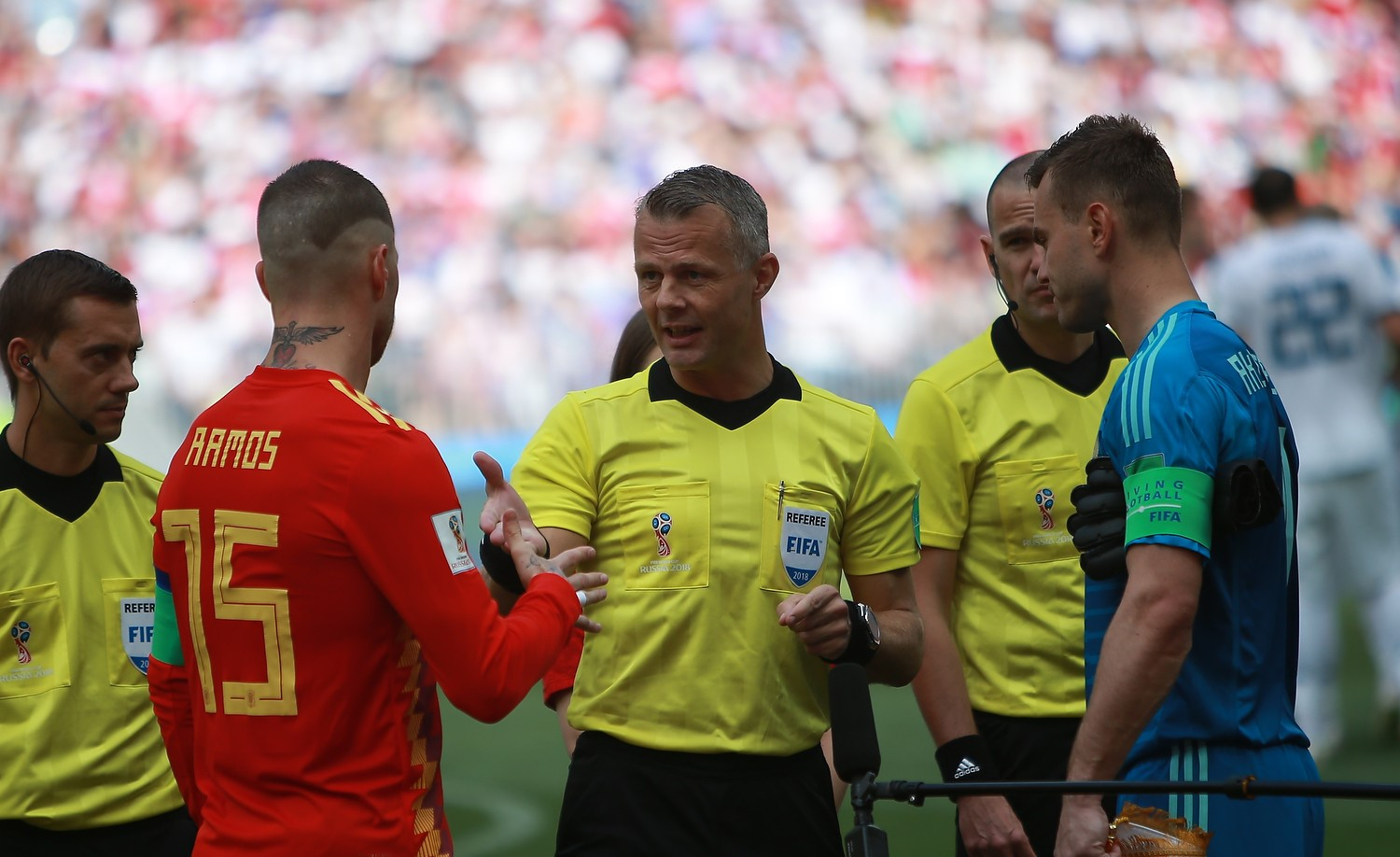
Ramos (left, in red) with Russia captain Igor Akinfeev (right, in blue) and referee Björn Kuipers before the 2018 World Cup Round of 16 match at the Luzhniki Stadium in Moscow.

With new coach Luis Enrique, Ramos retained captaincy of the national team. He played in all four of Spain's 2018–19 UEFA Nations League group matches, becoming the nation's top scorer in the group with three goals – scoring once against England and twice against Croatia. Spain finished second in their UEFA Nations League Group, which saw them miss out on the 2019 UEFA Nations League Finals. In March 2019, Ramos scored the winner in Spain's first UEFA Euro 2020 qualifying match against Norway through another Panenka penalty in a 2–1 win. This was his tenth penalty of the season, scoring them all. It was also his fifth consecutive match scoring for Spain, which is a personal record. Spain manager Enrique hailed Ramos as a "unique player in history" after the match.

=== 2019–2021: Record caps for Spain ===
In the second Euro 2020 qualification match, away to Malta, Ramos did not score for the first time in six matches for Spain – failing to extend his scoring streak. However, the match ended 2–0 to Spain which was his 121st win with La Roja, equaling the all-time record of Iker Casillas. On 7 June 2019, Ramos broke the record of most international victories with 122, following a 4–1 victory against the Faroe Islands, scoring Spain's opening goal in the process. Three days later, ahead of the match against Sweden, Ramos received a plaque from the Spanish Football Federation to commemorate his record. The match ended with a 3–0 win for Spain, where he scored the first goal and extended his tally to 123 international victories. On 5 September 2019, Ramos scored from a penalty kick his 21st international goal to open the score in Spain's 2–1 away win over Romania in a Euro 2020 qualifier, which made him the joint 10th top scorer in the history of the national team, alongside Míchel. On 8 September, Ramos won his 167th cap for Spain in a 4–0 home win over the Faroe Islands in a Euro 2020 qualifier; with this appearance, he equaled Iker Casillas as Spain's most capped player of all time. On 12 October 2019, he became the nation's sole most capped player.

On 6 September 2020, Ramos scored a brace in a 4–0 win over Ukraine for the 2020–21 UEFA Nations League, reaching 23 international goals and equaling Alfredo Di Stéfano as Spain's eighth-highest all-time goalscorer. On 14 November 2020, in a 1–1 draw against Switzerland, he made his 177th appearance for Spain and overtook Gianluigi Buffon's record for the most international caps received by a European player.

Ramos made his last international appearance on 31 March 2021 as an 86th-minute substitute in a 3–1 home 2022 FIFA World Cup qualifying victory against Kosovo.

=== 2021–2023: Squad exclusions and retirement ===
Ramos was excluded from the squad for UEFA Euro 2020, following an injury-plagued season. His omission marked the first major tournament since Euro 2004 where he was not called for the national team, ending a run of featuring in ten consecutive tournaments. In November 2022, he was excluded from the squad for the 2022 FIFA World Cup.

Ramos announced his retirement from international football on 23 February 2023 at the age of 36, having not appeared for his country in nearly two years, after new coach Luis de la Fuente told him he would no longer be selected.

== Player profile ==
=== Style of play ===
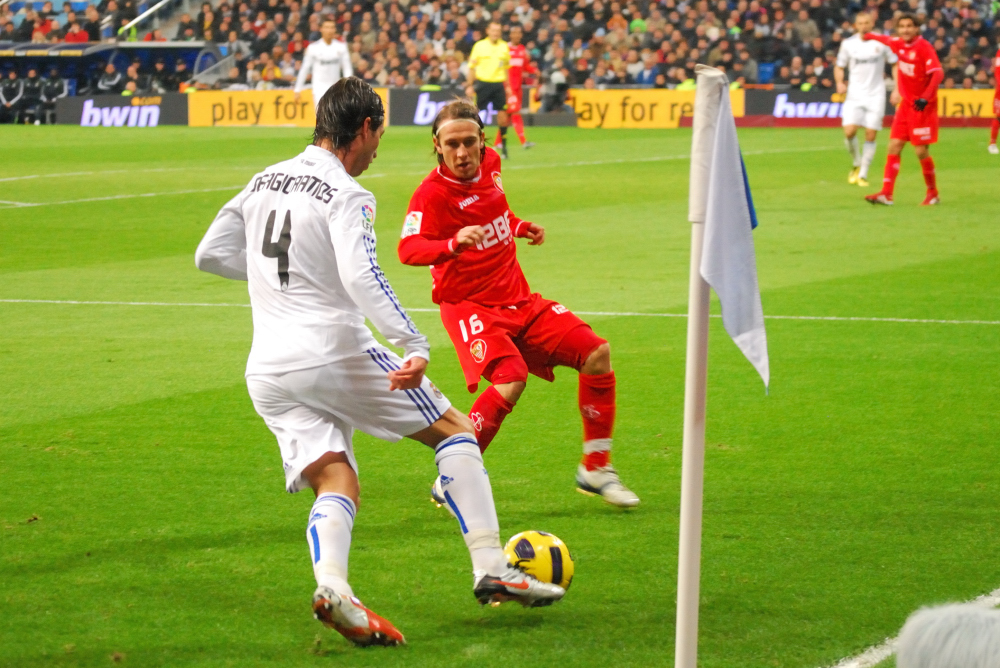
Ramos has been described as being comfortable on the ball, possessing good technical ability and good crossing ability.

Widely regarded as one of the greatest defenders of all time, Ramos is a physically strong player with an ability to score from set pieces; he is known for his strong tackles, positioning, and aerial abilities, which allow him to excel in one-on-one situations. In addition to his defensive prowess, he is gifted with pace, good technical ability, and good crossing ability. According to Spanish sports newspaper Marca and FIFA's official records, in 2015, Ramos was clocked at a sprinting speed of 30.6 kilometers per hour, making him one of the fastest footballers at that time. He is also an accurate penalty taker and often uses the Panenka technique to take them. He can also take free kicks due to his ability to bend the ball.

Ramos is praised for his leadership, athleticism, and his offensive and defense prowess, which allows him to be deployed as a centre-back and as a full-back; in his youth, he often played as a right-back, while he later established himself as a centre-back as his career progressed. His former Real Madrid manager Carlo Ancelotti has compared him to legendary defender Paolo Maldini; both he and Giorgio Chiellini called Ramos the best defender in the world. In 2021, Polish striker Robert Lewandowski named Chiellini and Ramos as the toughest defenders he has ever faced. Ramos has also played as a defensive midfielder, in particular under Ancelotti during the 2014–15 season. Ramos has been praised for his amazing performances in big games, most notably for Real Madrid, due to his ability to score crucial goals. However, his consistency has been questioned by the media, and he’s prone to occasional defensive errors.

Ramos is often criticised in the media for committing overly aggressive, reckless tackles and for picking up an excessive amount of cards; he has also been accused of diving.

=== Disciplinary record ===
Ramos holds multiple disciplinary records, for Real Madrid, the Champions League, La Liga, El Clásico and the Spain national team.

Ramos holds the record for the most carded player in La Liga, with 191 cards. His 171 yellow cards surpass that of Alberto Lopo, the former record holder for La Liga yellow cards. The remaining 20 are red cards, making Ramos the most red-carded player in La Liga as well. His La Liga cards are higher than that of any other player in the top five European leagues.

In the Champions League, Ramos has amassed 40 yellow cards and four red cards (three of which were straight red cards), making him both the most carded player and joint most red carded player in Champions League history.

Finally, Ramos also holds the record for being the most carded player in the history of the Spain national team, with 24 yellow cards.

== Personal life ==
Ramos began a relationship with journalist/presenter Pilar Rubio in September 2012 and they were seen together at that year's Ballon d'Or ceremony. They have four sons together: Sergio, Marco, Alejandro, and Máximo Adriano. On 16 July 2018, Ramos and Rubio got engaged. On 15 June 2019, they got married in Seville.

Ramos has a close relationship with his family, especially his siblings and parents. Rene, his brother, is currently his football agent, and is married to singer Lorena Gómez. Ramos is a fan of bullfighting and he is friends with bullfighter Alejandro Talavante. Ramos also owns a stud farm in his native town of Andalusia that is dedicated to breeding the Andalusian horse. His horse, 'Yucatán SR4' became a World Champion in 2018. In addition, he and his wife Rubio are art collectors.

In June 2014, Ramos was appointed as an ambassador for UNICEF Spain.

Ramos is the second cousin of former footballer José Mari. Ramos is Catholic, and was baptised at the Parish Church of Nuestra Senora de La Moraleja in Madrid.

=== Body art ===
Ramos has lots of tattoos, including Jesus, Mary, the Star of David, a lion, a wolf, a dreamcatcher, the map of Spain, a Native American chief, the hamsa, the FIFA World Cup and Champions League trophies and his family members.

=== Amazon Prime documentary ===
In January 2019, Amazon Prime and Ramos himself announced they would release an eight-episode documentary series on Ramos's life in football and outside of football. It was named El Corazón de Sergio Ramos (The Heart of Sergio Ramos). On 5 March, during Real Madrid's Champions League Round of 16 second leg match, Ramos was suspended and watched the match from his VIP area in the stands. His reactions were filmed by the Amazon Prime crew. This sparked controversy as Real Madrid lost the match and were eliminated from the Champions League, though Ramos said on social media that there were "certain commitments made and it never remotely went through my head that the game could have turned out as it did".

Due to the success of his first documentary series, Ramos announced in June 2020 on social media that Amazon would release another documentary known as La Leyenda Sergio Ramos (The Legend of Sergio Ramos), which consists of six episodes and shows his career highlights. It was released in Spain in April 2021 and was released worldwide in June 2021.

=== Attempted acquisition of Sevilla ===
In 2026, Sergio Ramos, alongside the investment group Five Eleven Capital, attempted to acquire a controlling stake in Sevilla. Negotiations reportedly centered on a deal worth around €450 million, but collapsed after Ramos' consortium submitted a revised offer that reduced the purchase price and altered the ownership structure from an immediate majority acquisition to a smaller initial stake with a proposed future capital increase. Sevilla's shareholders rejected the revised terms and ended the negotiations.

== Career statistics ==
=== Club ===
As of match played 6 December 2025

Appearances and goals by club, season and competition
Club	Season	League			National cup (Note: Includes Copa del Rey, Coupe de France)		Continental		Other		Total	
Club	Season	Division	Apps	Goals	Apps	Goals	Apps	Goals	Apps	Goals	Apps	Goals
Sevilla Atlético	2003–04	Segunda División B	26	2	—		—		—		26	2
Sevilla	2003–04	La Liga	7	0	0	0	0	0	0	0	7	0
Sevilla	2004–05	La Liga	31	2	5	0	6 (Note: Appearances in UEFA Cup)	1	—		42	3
Sevilla	2005–06	La Liga	1	0	0	0	0	0	0	0	1	0
Sevilla	Total		39	2	5	0	6	1	0	0	50	3
Real Madrid	2005–06	La Liga	33	4	6	1	7 (Note: Appearances in UEFA Champions League)	1	0	0	46	6
Real Madrid	2006–07	La Liga	33	5	3	0	6	1	0	0	42	6
Real Madrid	2007–08	La Liga	33	5	3	0	7	0	2 (Note: Appearance(s) in Supercopa de España)	1	45	6
Real Madrid	2008–09	La Liga	32	4	0	0	8	1	2	1	42	6
Real Madrid	2009–10	La Liga	33	4	0	0	7	0	0	0	40	4
Real Madrid	2010–11	La Liga	31	3	7	1	8	0	0	0	46	4
Real Madrid	2011–12	La Liga	34	3	4	0	11	1	2	0	51	4
Real Madrid	2012–13	La Liga	26	4	3	0	9	1	2	0	40	5
Real Madrid	2013–14	La Liga	32	4	8	0	11	3	0	0	51	7
Real Madrid	2014–15	La Liga	27	4	2	1	8	0	5 (Note: One appearance in UEFA Super Cup, two appearances in Supercopa de España, two appearances and two goals in FIFA Club World Cup)	2	42	7
Real Madrid	2015–16	La Liga	23	2	0	0	10	1	0	0	33	3
Real Madrid	2016–17	La Liga	28	7	3	1	11	1	2 (Note: One appearance in UEFA Super Cup, one appearance in FIFA Club World Cup)	1	44	10
Real Madrid	2017–18	La Liga	26	4	1	0	11	1	4 (Note: One appearance in UEFA Super Cup, two appearances in Supercopa de España, one appearance in FIFA Club World Cup)	0	42	5
Real Madrid	2018–19	La Liga	28	6	6	3	5	0	3 (Note: One appearance and one goal in UEFA Super Cup, two appearances and one goal in FIFA Club World Cup)	2	42	11
Real Madrid	2019–20	La Liga	35	11	2	0	5	2	2	0	44	13
Real Madrid	2020–21	La Liga	15	2	0	0	5	2	1	0	21	4
Real Madrid	Total		469	72	48	7	129	15	25	7	671	101
Paris Saint-Germain	2021–22	Ligue 1	12	2	1	0	0	0	0	0	13	2
Paris Saint-Germain	2022–23	Ligue 1	33	2	3	1	8	0	1 (Note: Appearance in Trophée des Champions)	1	45	4
Paris Saint-Germain	Total		45	4	4	1	8	0	1	1	58	6
Sevilla	2023–24	La Liga	28	3	4	2	5	2	—		37	7
Monterrey	2024–25	Liga MX	8	3	—		1 (Note: Appearance in CONCACAF Champions Cup)	1	4 (Note: Appearances in FIFA Club World Cup)	1	13	5
Monterrey	2025–26	Liga MX	19	3	—		—		2 (Note: Appearances in Leagues Cup)	0	21	3
Monterrey	Total		27	6	—		1	1	6	1	34	8
Career total			634	89	61	10	149	19	32	9	876	127

=== International ===
Appearances and goals by national team and year
Team	Year	Competitive		Friendly		Total	
Team	Year	Apps	Goals	Apps	Goals	Apps	Goals
Spain U16	2002	0	0	1	0	1	0
Spain U17	2003	0	0	1	0	1	0
Spain U19	2004	7 (Note: Three appearances in 2004 UEFA European Under-19 Championship second qualifying round, four appearances in 2004 UEFA European Under-19 Championship)	0	0	0	7	0
Spain U21	2004	3 (Note: All appearances in 2006 UEFA European Under-21 Championship qualification)	0	3	0	6	0
Spain	2005	4 (Note: All appearances in 2006 FIFA World Cup qualification)	2	3	0	7	2
Spain	2006	6 (Note: Three appearances in 2006 FIFA World Cup, three appearances in UEFA Euro 2008 qualifying)	0	7	0	13	0
Spain	2007	8 (Note: All appearances in UEFA Euro 2008 qualifying)	2	2	0	10	2
Spain	2008	9 (Note: Five appearances in UEFA Euro 2008, four appearances in 2010 FIFA World Cup qualification)	0	6	0	15	0
Spain	2009	7 (Note: Four appearances in 2010 FIFA World Cup qualification, three appearances in 2009 FIFA Confederations Cup)	0	4	0	11	0
Spain	2010	10 (Note: Seven appearances in 2010 FIFA World Cup, three appearances in UEFA Euro 2012 qualifying)	0	6	1	16	1
Spain	2011	5 (Note: All appearances in UEFA Euro 2012 qualifying)	1	5	0	10	1
Spain	2012	9 (Note: Six appearances in UEFA Euro 2012, three appearances in 2014 FIFA World Cup qualification)	1	7	1	16	2
Spain	2013	10 (Note: Five appearances in 2014 FIFA World Cup qualification, five appearances in 2013 FIFA Confederations Cup)	1	7	0	17	1
Spain	2014	5 (Note: Three appearances in 2014 FIFA World Cup, two appearances in UEFA Euro 2016 qualifying)	1	4	0	9	1
Spain	2015	4 (Note: All appearances in UEFA Euro 2016 qualifying)	0	2	0	6	0
Spain	2016	7 (Note: Four appearances in UEFA Euro 2016, three appearances in 2018 FIFA World Cup qualification)	0	3	0	10	0
Spain	2017	6 (Note: All appearances in 2018 FIFA World Cup qualification)	1	3	2	9	3
Spain	2018	8 (Note: Four appearances in 2018 FIFA World Cup, four appearances in 2018–19 UEFA Nations League)	3	4	1	12	4
Spain	2019	9 (Note: All appearances in UEFA Euro 2020 qualifying)	4	0	0	9	4
Spain	2020	6 (Note: All appearances in 2020–21 UEFA Nations League)	2	2	0	8	2
Spain	2021	2 (Note: All appearances in 2022 FIFA World Cup qualification)	0	0	0	2	0
Spain	Total	115	18	65	5	180	23
Career total		125	18	70	5	195	23

Scores and results list Spain's goal tally first, score column indicates score after each Ramos goal.

List of international goals scored by Sergio Ramos
No.	Date	Venue	Opponent	Score	Result	Competition
1	13 October 2005	Stadio Olimpico, Serravalle, San Marino	San Marino	3–0	4–0	2006 FIFA World Cup qualification
2	13 October 2005	Stadio Olimpico, Serravalle, San Marino	San Marino	4–0	4–0	2006 FIFA World Cup qualification
3	13 October 2007	Atletion, Aarhus, Denmark	Denmark	2–0	3–1	UEFA Euro 2008 qualification
4	17 November 2007	Santiago Bernabéu, Madrid, Spain	Sweden	3–0	3–0	UEFA Euro 2008 qualification
5	3 March 2010	Stade de France, Saint-Denis, France	France	2–0	2–0	Friendly
6	6 September 2011	Las Gaunas, Logroño, Spain	Liechtenstein	4–0	6–0	UEFA Euro 2012 qualification
7	16 October 2012	Vicente Calderón, Madrid, Spain	France	1–0	1–1	2014 FIFA World Cup qualification
8	14 November 2012	Estadio Rommel Fernández, Panama City, Panama	Panama	4–0	5–1	Friendly
9	22 March 2013	El Molinón, Gijón, Spain	Finland	1–0	1–1	2014 FIFA World Cup qualification
10	8 September 2014	Ciutat de València, Valencia, Spain	Macedonia	1–0	5–1	UEFA Euro 2016 qualification
11	5 September 2017	Rheinpark Stadion, Vaduz, Liechtenstein	Liechtenstein	1–0	8–0	2018 FIFA World Cup qualification
12	14 November 2017	Krestovsky Stadium, Saint Petersburg, Russia	Russia	2–0	3–3	Friendly
13	14 November 2017	Krestovsky Stadium, Saint Petersburg, Russia	Russia	3–3	3–3	Friendly
14	11 September 2018	Martínez Valero, Elche, Spain	Croatia	5–0	6–0	2018–19 UEFA Nations League A
15	11 October 2018	Millennium Stadium, Cardiff, Wales	Wales	2–0	4–1	Friendly
16	15 October 2018	Benito Villamarín, Seville, Spain	England	2–3	2–3	2018–19 UEFA Nations League A
17	15 November 2018	Stadion Maksimir, Zagreb, Croatia	Croatia	2–2	2–3	2018–19 UEFA Nations League A
18	23 March 2019	Mestalla, Valencia, Spain	Norway	2–1	2–1	UEFA Euro 2020 qualification
19	7 June 2019	Tórsvøllur, Tórshavn, Faroe Islands	Faroe Islands	1–0	4–1	UEFA Euro 2020 qualification
20	10 June 2019	Santiago Bernabéu, Madrid, Spain	Sweden	1–0	3–0	UEFA Euro 2020 qualification
21	5 September 2019	Arena Națională, Bucharest, Romania	Romania	1–0	2–1	UEFA Euro 2020 qualification
22	6 September 2020	Alfredo Di Stéfano, Madrid, Spain	Ukraine	1–0	4–0	2020–21 UEFA Nations League A
23	6 September 2020	Alfredo Di Stéfano, Madrid, Spain	Ukraine	2–0	4–0	2020–21 UEFA Nations League A

== Honours ==
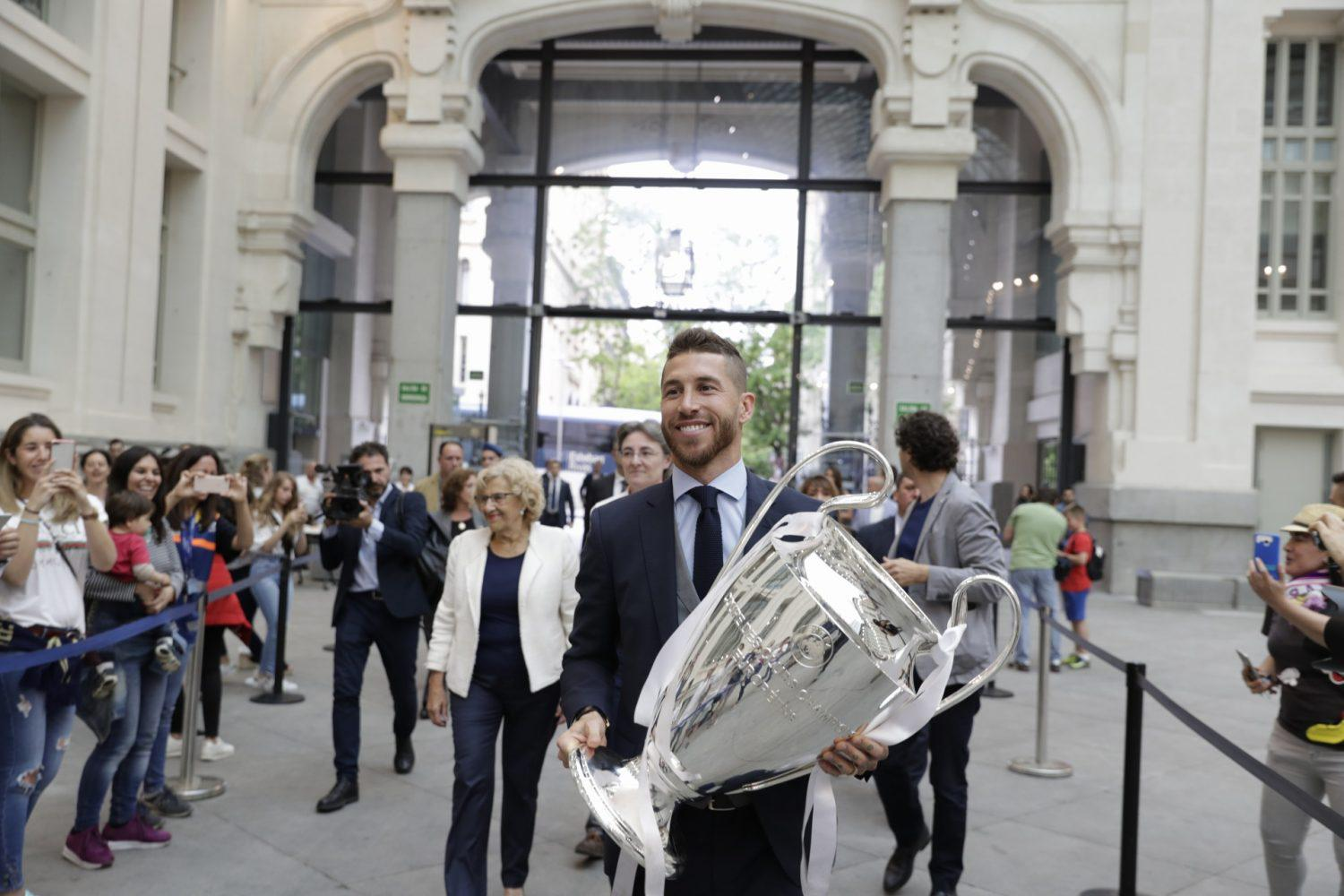
Ramos in 2018 with the UEFA Champions League trophy at the Cybele Palace

Real Madrid

- La Liga: 2006–07, 2007–08, 2011–12, 2016–17, 2019–20
- Copa del Rey: 2010–11, 2013–14
- Supercopa de España: 2008, 2012, 2017, 2020
- UEFA Champions League: 2013–14, 2015–16, 2016–17, 2017–18
- UEFA Super Cup: 2014, 2016, 2017
- FIFA Club World Cup: 2014, 2016, 2017, 2018

Paris Saint-Germain

- Ligue 1: 2021–22, 2022–23
- Trophée des Champions: 2022

Spain U19

- UEFA European Under-19 Championship: 2004

Spain

- FIFA World Cup: 2010
- UEFA European Championship: 2008, 2012
- FIFA Confederations Cup runner-up: 2013; third place: 2009

Individual

- La Liga Breakthrough Player of the Year: 2005
- FIFA FIFPRO World 11: 2008, 2011, 2012, 2013, 2014, 2015, 2016, 2017, 2018, 2019, 2020
- UEFA Team of the Year: 2008, 2012, 2013, 2014, 2015, 2016, 2017, 2018, 2020
- FIFA World Cup Dream Team: 2010
- FIFA World Cup All-Star Team: 2010
- La Liga Best Defender: 2011–12, 2012–13, 2013–14, 2014–15, 2016–17
- UEFA European Championship Team of the Tournament: 2012
- FIFA Confederations Cup Dream Team: 2013
- UEFA Champions League Squad of the Season: 2013–14, 2015–16, 2016–17, 2017–18
- FIFA Club World Cup Golden Ball: 2014
- FIFA Club World Cup top scorer: 2014
- UEFA Ultimate Team of the Year: 2015
- La Liga Team of the Season: 2015–16
- UEFA La Liga Team of the Season: 2016–17, 2019–20
- ESM Team of the Year: 2007–08, 2011–12, 2014–15, 2016–17
- UEFA Champions League Defender of the Season: 2017, 2018
- IFFHS Men's World Team: 2017, 2018, 2019, 2020
- IFFHS World Team of the Decade: 2011–2020
- IFFHS UEFA Team of the Decade: 2011–2020
- IFFHS World's Highest Scoring Defender of the Decade: 2011–2020
- IFFHS World's Highest Scoring Defender of the 21st century: 2001–2020
- IFFHS All-Time Spain Men's Dream Team
- Castrol Performance Index: 2010 FIFA World Cup Castrol Index Winner
- Castrol Performance Index: UEFA Euro 2012 Castrol EDGE Index Winner
- Luis Aragones Award: 2016
- Ballon d'Or Dream Team (Bronze): 2020
- L'Équipe Team of the Year: 2020
- L'Équipe Team of the Year (Fan Vote): 2020
- 11Leyendas Jornal AS: 2021
- Globe Soccer Awards "Best Defender of All Time"
- Liga MX All-Star: 2025

== Discography ==
Title	Year	Peak chart positions	Album
Title	Year	SPA	Album
"La roja baila (Himno oficial de la selección española)" (with Niña Pastori and RedOne)	2016	43	non-album singles
"SR4"	2018	—	non-album singles
"Otra estrella en tu corazón" (with Demarco Flamenco)	2018	—	non-album singles
"No Me Contradigas" (with Los Yakis)	2024	—	non-album singles
"CIBELES"	2025	—	non-album singles

== See also ==
- List of footballers with 100 or more UEFA Champions League appearances
- List of men's footballers with 100 or more international caps
- List of men's footballers with the most official appearances
- List of Real Madrid CF records and statistics
- List of La Liga players (400+ appearances)
