= Orzinuovi =

New Orzi I Urs Nöf
- Comune
- Città di Orzinuovi
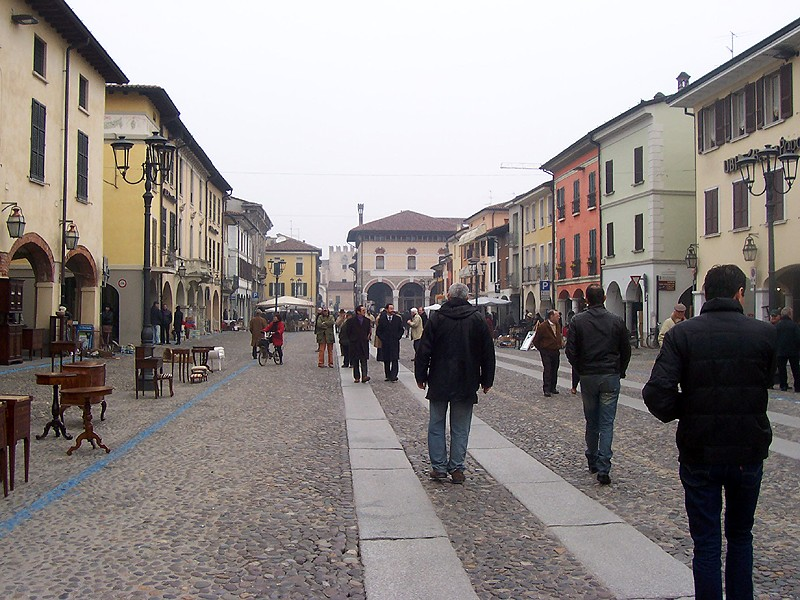

- Coat of arms

- Location within Italy Location within Lombardy
- Coordinates: 45°24′12″N 9°55′30″E
- Country: Italy
- Region: Lombardy
- Province: Brescia (BS)
- Frazioni: Barco, Pudiano, Ovanengo, Coniolo

Government
  - Mayor: Laura Magli

Area
  - Total: 47.87 km^{2} (18.48 sq mi)
- Elevation: 81 m (266 ft)

Population (2011)
  - Total: 12,659
  - Density: 264.4/km^{2} (684.9/sq mi)
- Demonym: Orceani
- Time zone: UTC+1 (CET)
  - Summer (DST): UTC+2 (CEST)
- Postal code: 25034
- Dialing code: 030
- Patron saint: St. Bartholomew
- Saint day: August 24
- Website: Official website

Orzinuovi (Italian pronunciation: [ordziˈnwɔːvi]; Brescian: I Urs Nöf) is a town and comune in the province of Brescia, in Lombardy, Italy.

== History ==
It was founded in 1193 by statute of the comune of Brescia, as a boundary fortress with the name of "Orci Novi". Its history thenceforth closely follows that of Brescia, sharing the Venetian dominion from 1466 until Venice's demise in 1797. It became part of Napoleon's Italian states until 1815, when it became part of the Kingdom of Lombardy–Venetia, as part of the Austrian Empire. This continued until the Second Italian Independence War. From 1860 it has been part of the Italy/Kingdom of Italy.

In the 2010s, Orzinuovi was involved in an illicit traffic of solid toxic waste treatment which concerns the bordering municipalities.

== Frazioni ==
- Coniolo (Eastern Lombard: Cuniöl)
- Barco
- Pudiano
- Ovanengo
- Rossa

== See also ==
- Orceana Calcio, the football club of Orzinuovi
- Pallacanestro Orzinuovi, the basketball club of Orzinuovi.
