= Orceana Calcio =

Italian football club

Orceana
- Full name: Orceana Calcio
- Founded: 1919
- Ground: Stadio Comunale, Orzinuovi, Italy
- Capacity: 1500
- League: Prima Categoria
- 2011–12: Promozione Lombardia, 13th
Home colours	Away colours

Orceana Calcio is an Italian association football team from Orzinuovi. It was founded in 1919. It took part to Serie C2 from 1978 to 1980.

Its most famous coach was Luigi Maifredi, that later coached Juventus FC and other important teams.
