= 2004 UEFA European Under-19 Championship qualification =

The 2004 UEFA European Under-19 Championship qualifying competition was a men's under-19 football competition played in 2003 and 2004 to determine the seven teams joining Switzerland, who qualified automatically as hosts, in the 2004 UEFA European Under-19 Championship final tournament.

== First qualifying round ==
The first qualifying round saw 25 teams (12 group winners, 12 group runners-up and the third-placed team that performed best against the numbers 1 and 2 of its group) qualify for the second qualifying round.

=== Byes ===
The following teams received a bye for this round:

- Czech Republic
- Spain
- Slovakia
- Switzerland (main tournament host)

=== Group 1 ===
Team	Pld	W	D	L	GF	GA	GD	Pts
Slovenia	3	2	0	1	5	5	0	6
Romania	3	2	0	1	4	3	+1	6
Hungary	3	1	1	1	4	2	+2	4
Northern Ireland	3	0	1	2	2	5	−3	1

All matches were played in Northern Ireland. This group brought forth the best third placed team. Hungary performed best against group winners and runners-up Slovenia and Romania, achieving 3 points and a goal difference of +2 (4-2).

Romania	0–2	Slovenia
Northern Ireland	0–0	Hungary
Romania	2–0	Hungary
Slovenia	3–1	Northern Ireland
Northern Ireland	1–2	Romania
Hungary	4–0	Slovenia

=== Group 2 ===
Team	Pld	W	D	L	GF	GA	GD	Pts
Poland	3	3	0	0	5	0	+5	9
Norway	3	2	0	1	7	4	+3	6
Latvia	3	1	0	2	6	8	−2	3
Cyprus	3	0	0	3	3	9	−6	0

All matches were played in Poland.

Poland	3–0	Latvia
Norway	4–1	Cyprus
Poland	1–0	Cyprus
Latvia	2–3	Norway
Norway	0–1	Poland
Cyprus	2–4	Latvia

=== Group 3 ===
Team	Pld	W	D	L	GF	GA	GD	Pts
Belgium	3	3	0	0	9	1	+8	9
Italy	3	2	0	1	4	3	+1	6
Georgia	3	1	0	2	8	5	+3	3
Estonia	3	0	0	3	1	13	−12	0

All matches were played in Estonia.

Belgium	3–0	Georgia
Italy	2–0	Estonia
Belgium	3–0	Estonia
Georgia	0–1	Italy
Italy	1–3	Belgium
Estonia	1–8	Georgia

=== Group 4 ===
Team	Pld	W	D	L	GF	GA	GD	Pts
Germany	3	2	1	0	17	4	+13	7
Denmark	3	2	1	0	10	3	+7	7
Malta	3	1	0	2	5	15	−10	3
Luxembourg	3	0	0	3	2	12	−10	0

All matches were played in Germany.

Denmark	5–1	Malta
Germany	6–1	Luxembourg
Denmark	3–0	Luxembourg
Malta	1–9	Germany
Germany	2–2	Denmark
Luxembourg	1–3	Malta

=== Group 5 ===
Team	Pld	W	D	L	GF	GA	GD	Pts
Croatia	3	3	0	0	7	1	+6	9
Finland	3	2	0	1	7	4	+3	6
Albania	3	0	1	2	1	3	−2	1
Azerbaijan	3	0	1	2	2	9	−7	1

All matches were played in Croatia.

Croatia	1–0	Albania
Finland	5–1	Azerbaijan
Albania	0–1	Finland
Croatia	3–0	Azerbaijan
Finland	1–3	Croatia
Azerbaijan	1–1	Albania

=== Group 6 ===
Team	Pld	W	D	L	GF	GA	GD	Pts
Republic of Ireland	3	2	1	0	13	3	+10	7
Lithuania	3	1	1	1	3	3	0	4
Bulgaria	3	1	1	1	8	2	+6	4
San Marino	3	0	1	2	2	18	−16	1

All matches were played in San Marino.

Republic of Ireland	1–1	Bulgaria
Lithuania	1–1	San Marino
Lithuania	1–0	Bulgaria
San Marino	1–10	Republic of Ireland
Republic of Ireland	2–1	Lithuania
Bulgaria	7–0	San Marino

=== Group 7 ===
Team	Pld	W	D	L	GF	GA	GD	Pts
Belarus	3	1	2	0	4	1	+3	5
Portugal	3	1	2	0	4	3	+1	5
Wales	3	1	0	2	3	6	−3	3
Greece	3	0	2	1	2	3	−1	2

All matches were played in Belarus.

Portugal	2–1	Wales
Greece	0–0	Belarus
Portugal	1–1	Belarus
Wales	2–1	Greece
Greece	1–1	Portugal
Belarus	3–0	Wales

=== Group 8 ===
Team	Pld	W	D	L	GF	GA	GD	Pts
England	3	3	0	0	7	0	+7	9
Russia	3	2	0	1	9	1	+8	6
Liechtenstein	3	1	0	2	3	9	−6	3
Andorra	3	0	0	3	1	10	−9	0

All matches were played in Russia.

England	2–0	Liechtenstein
Russia	3–0	Andorra
England	4–0	Andorra
Liechtenstein	0–6	Russia
Russia	0–1	England
Andorra	1–3	Liechtenstein

=== Group 9 ===
Team	Pld	W	D	L	GF	GA	GD	Pts
Austria	3	1	2	0	12	6	+6	5
Serbia and Montenegro	3	1	2	0	6	5	+1	5
Sweden	3	1	2	0	13	6	+7	5
Kazakhstan	3	0	0	3	3	17	−14	0

All matches were played in Sweden.

Austria	2–2	Sweden
Serbia and Montenegro	1–0	Kazakhstan
Austria	7–1	Kazakhstan
Sweden	2–2	Serbia and Montenegro
Serbia and Montenegro	3–3	Austria
Kazakhstan	2–9	Sweden

=== Group 10 ===
Team	Pld	W	D	L	GF	GA	GD	Pts
Netherlands	3	1	2	0	3	1	+2	5
Israel	3	1	1	1	3	4	−1	4
Iceland	3	1	1	1	5	5	0	4
Moldova	3	0	2	1	3	4	−1	2

All matches were played in Moldova.

Israel	1–1	Moldova
Netherlands	1–1	Iceland
Israel	2–1	Iceland
Moldova	0–0	Netherlands
Netherlands	2–0	Israel
Iceland	3–2	Moldova

=== Group 11 ===
Team	Pld	W	D	L	GF	GA	GD	Pts
Armenia	3	2	1	0	5	1	+4	7
Ukraine	3	2	0	1	6	5	+1	6
France	3	1	1	1	2	2	0	4
Bosnia and Herzegovina	3	0	0	3	4	9	−5	0

All matches were played in Ukraine.

Ukraine	0–1	Armenia
France	1–0	Bosnia and Herzegovina
Armenia	0–0	France
Ukraine	4–3	Bosnia and Herzegovina
France	1–2	Ukraine
Bosnia and Herzegovina	1–4	Armenia

=== Group 12 ===
Team	Pld	W	D	L	GF	GA	GD	Pts
Turkey	3	2	1	0	9	2	+7	7
Scotland	3	2	1	0	6	2	+4	7
Macedonia	3	1	0	2	5	5	0	3
Faroe Islands	3	0	0	3	1	12	−11	0

All matches were played in Scotland.

Scotland	3–1	Faroe Islands
Macedonia	1–3	Turkey
Scotland	1–1	Turkey
Faroe Islands	0–4	Macedonia
Macedonia	0–2	Scotland
Turkey	5–0	Faroe Islands

== Second qualifying round ==
The second qualifying round saw seven group winners qualify for the main tournament in Switzerland.

=== Teams ===
The following teams qualified for this round:

12 group winners from the first qualifying round

- Armenia
- Austria
- Belarus
- Belgium
- Croatia
- England
- Germany
- Netherlands
- Poland
- Slovenia
- Republic of Ireland
- Turkey

12 group runners-up from the first qualifying round

- Denmark
- Finland
- Israel
- Italy
- Lithuania
- Norway
- Portugal
- Romania
- Russia
- Scotland
- Serbia and Montenegro
- Ukraine

1 best group third-place finisher from the first qualifying round

- Hungary

3 teams received a bye for the first qualifying round

- Czech Republic
- Slovakia
- Spain

=== Group 1 ===
All matches were played in Spain.

Teams	Pld	W	D	L	GF	GA	GD	Pts
Spain	3	2	1	0	4	0	+4	7
Hungary	3	1	1	1	1	3	–2	4
Netherlands	3	1	0	2	1	2	–1	3
Lithuania	3	0	2	1	0	1	–1	2

Spain	0–0	Lithuania
Hungary	1–0	Netherlands
Spain	1–0	Netherlands
Lithuania	0–0	Hungary
Hungary	0–3	Spain
Netherlands	1–0	Lithuania

=== Group 2 ===
All matches were played in one country.

Teams	Pld	W	D	L	GF	GA	GD	Pts
Italy	3	2	1	0	7	2	+5	7
Israel	3	1	1	1	2	3	–1	4
Czech Republic	3	1	1	1	4	2	+2	4
Belarus	3	0	1	2	2	8	–6	1

Czech Republic	3–0	Belarus
Italy	2–0	Israel
Czech Republic	0–1	Israel
Belarus	1–4	Italy
Italy	1–1	Czech Republic
Israel	1–1	Belarus

=== Group 3 ===
All matches were played in Slovakia.

Teams	Pld	W	D	L	GF	GA	GD	Pts
Germany	3	3	0	0	8	1	+7	9
Slovakia	3	2	0	1	4	3	+1	6
Portugal	3	1	0	2	5	3	+2	3
Armenia	3	0	0	3	0	10	–10	0

Slovakia	2–1	Portugal
Germany	5–0	Armenia
Slovakia	1–0	Armenia
Portugal	0–1	Germany
Germany	2–1	Slovakia
Armenia	0–4	Portugal

=== Group 4 ===
All matches were played in Slovenia.

Teams	Pld	W	D	L	GF	GA	GD	Pts
Ukraine	3	2	1	0	6	2	+4	7
Slovenia	3	1	1	1	3	5	–2	4
England	3	1	1	1	5	3	+2	4
Denmark	3	0	1	2	0	4	–4	1

Slovenia	2–1	England
Denmark	0–1	Ukraine
Slovenia	1–4	Ukraine
England	3–0	Denmark
Denmark	0–0	Slovenia
Ukraine	1–1	England

=== Group 5 ===
All matches were played in Turkey.

Teams	Pld	W	D	L	GF	GA	GD	Pts
Turkey	3	2	1	0	7	2	+5	7
Croatia	3	2	0	1	6	3	+3	6
Russia	3	1	1	1	3	3	0	4
Romania	3	0	0	3	1	9	–8	0

Romania	0–2	Russia
Croatia	1–2	Turkey
Romania	0–4	Turkey
Russia	0–2	Croatia
Croatia	3–1	Romania
Turkey	1–1	Russia

=== Group 6 ===
All matches were played in Austria.

Teams	Pld	W	D	L	GF	GA	GD	Pts
Poland	3	3	0	0	6	2	+4	9
Austria	3	2	0	1	6	1	+5	6
Finland	3	1	0	2	3	5	–2	3
Scotland	3	0	0	3	4	11	–7	0

Poland	1–0	Austria
Finland	3–2	Scotland
Poland	3–2	Scotland
Austria	1–0	Finland
Finland	0–2	Poland
Scotland	0–5	Austria

=== Group 7 ===
All matches were played in Belgium.

Teams	Pld	W	D	L	GF	GA	GD	Pts
Belgium	3	3	0	0	3	0	+3	9
Republic of Ireland	3	2	0	1	6	2	+4	6
Serbia and Montenegro	3	1	0	2	5	4	+1	3
Norway	3	0	0	3	0	8	–8	0

Norway	0–4	Serbia and Montenegro
Republic of Ireland	0–1	Belgium
Norway	0–1	Belgium
Serbia and Montenegro	1–3	Republic of Ireland
Republic of Ireland	3–0	Norway
Belgium	1–0	Serbia and Montenegro

== See also ==
- 2004 UEFA European Under-19 Championship
