= Goran Antić =

Swiss footballer (born 1985)

Personal information
- Full name: Goran Antić
- Date of birth: 4 July 1985 (age 41)
- Place of birth: Switzerland
- Height: 1.83 m (6 ft 0 in)
- Position: Striker

Senior career*
Years	Team	Apps	(Gls)
2003–2004	FC Winterthur	18	(5)
2004–2005	FC Wil	17	(9)
2005–2006	FC Vaduz	26	(2)
2006–2008	FC Aarau	65	(8)
2009–2012	FC Winterthur	90	(17)
2012–2013	FC Aarau	14	(2)

International career^{‡}
- Switzerland U-17
2005–2006	Swiss U-21	4	(0)
Medal record
Men's football
Representing Switzerland
UEFA European Under-17 Championship
Winner	2002 Denmark
- * Club domestic league appearances and goals as of 23 July 2013 ‡ National team caps and goals as of 28 July 2006

Goran Antić (born 4 July 1985) is a Swiss footballer of Bosnian descent who plays as a striker.

== Career ==
On 23 February 2009 the forward has left FC Aarau of the Swiss Super League, to join his former club FC Winterthur.

== International career ==
Antić is a former youth international and was in the Swiss U-17 squad that won the 2002 U-17 European Championships.

== Honours ==
- UEFA U-17 European Champion: 2002
