= 1999–2000 Real Madrid CF season =

98th season in existence of Real Madrid CF

Real Madrid
1999–2000 season
- President: Lorenzo Sanz
- Head coach: John Toshack (until 17 November 1999); Vicente del Bosque
- Stadium: Santiago Bernabéu
- La Liga: 5th
- Copa del Rey: Semi-finals
- UEFA Champions League: Winners
- FIFA Club World Championship: Fourth place
- Top goalscorer: League: Raúl (17); All: Raúl (29)
- Biggest win: Real Madrid 4–1 Numancia; Real Madrid 4–1 Molde; Real Madrid 3–0 Barcelona; Real Madrid 3–0 Valencia
- Biggest defeat: Home: Real Madrid 1–5 Real Zaragoza; Away: Deportivo La Coruña 5–2 Real Madrid; Bayern 4–1 Real Madrid
Home colours	Away colours	Third colours

The 1999–2000 season was Real Madrid's 69th season in La Liga. This article lists all matches that the club played in the 1999–2000 season, and also shows statistics of the club's players.

== Summary ==
John Toshack was sacked by Real Madrid on 17 November 1999 as a consequence of league's bad form even after a 3–2 victory against Rayo Vallecano which they were trailing 2–0 during halftime and could only turn the game around through a spectacular second half that left them in eighth position. Real Madrid re-hired their legendary defensive midfielder in the 1970s Vicente del Bosque who previously only managed the club in 1994 and 1996 as a caretaker only.

This season marked the start of the Del Bosque era of trophy winning at the club, having taken over from Toshack early in the campaign. The squad was also largely different from the previous squad, with the arrival of Steve McManaman (Liverpool) and Nicolas Anelka (Arsenal) from the English Premier League respectively, as well as local talents Míchel Salgado and Iván Helguera, to support the budding young talent of Raúl, Iker Casillas, Fernando Morientes, and Guti, as well as veterans such as Fernando Hierro and Roberto Carlos.

As of 2025, this was the last season in which Real Madrid finished outside the top four in La Liga.

== Players ==
=== Squad ===
Note: Flags indicate national team as defined under FIFA eligibility rules; some limited exceptions apply. Players may hold more than one non-FIFA nationality.

No.	Pos.	Nation	Player
1	GK	GER	Bodo Illgner
2	DF	ESP	Míchel Salgado
3	DF	BRA	Roberto Carlos
4	DF	ESP	Fernando Hierro (vice-captain)
5	DF	ESP	Manolo Sanchís (captain)
6	MF	ARG	Fernando Redondo (3rd captain)
7	FW	ESP	Raúl
8	MF	ENG	Steve McManaman
9	FW	ESP	Fernando Morientes
10	MF	NED	Clarence Seedorf
11	MF	BRA	Sávio
12	DF	ESP	Iván Campo
13	GK	ARG	Albano Bizzarri
14	MF	ESP	Guti

No.	Pos.	Nation	Player
15	DF	ESP	Iván Helguera
16	FW	CMR	Samuel Eto'o
17	DF	ESP	Javier Dorado
18	DF	ESP	Aitor Karanka
19	FW	FRA	Nicolas Anelka
20	FW	BIH	Elvir Baljić
21	MF	CMR	Geremi
22	MF	FRA	Christian Karembeu
23	DF	BRA	Júlio César
24	MF	ESP	Álvaro Benito
25	FW	YUG	Perica Ognjenović
27	GK	ESP	Iker Casillas
31	FW	ESP	Meca
36	FW	ARG	Rolando Zárate

=== Transfers ===
In
Pos.	Name	from	Type
MF	Steve McManaman	Liverpool	
FW	Nicolas Anelka	Arsenal	€34,000,000
FW	Elvir Baljić	Fenerbahçe	€26,000,000
DF	Iván Helguera	Espanyol	
DF	Míchel Salgado	Celta de Vigo	€12,000,000
DF	Geremi	Gençlerbirliği	€4,200,000
GK	Albano Bizzarri	Racing Club	€2,000,000
DF	Júlio César	Valladolid	€2,500,000
FW	Edwin Congo	Once Caldas	

Out
Pos.	Name	To	Type
MF	Jaime	Deportivo	
FW	Davor Šuker	Arsenal	
FW	Predrag Mijatović	Fiorentina	
DF	Christian Panucci	Internazionale	
DF	Robert Jarni	Las Palmas	
DF	Fernando Sanz	Malaga	
GK	Pedro Contreras	Malaga	

==== Winter ====
In
Pos.	Name	from	Type

Out
Pos.	Name	To	Type
MF	Clarence Seedorf	Internazionale	
FW	Samuel Eto'o	Mallorca	loan
FW	Edwin Congo	Real Valladolid	loan

== Competitions ==
=== Overall ===
Competition	Started round	Final position / round	First match	Last match
La Liga	1	(5th) 38	1999-08-22	2000-05-21
UEFA Champions League	First group stage	Winners	1999-09-15	2000-05-24
Copa del Rey	Round of 16	Semi-finals	2000-01-19	2000-04-29
FIFA Club World Championship	Group stage	(4th) Third place playoff	2000-01-05	2000-01-14

Updated to match played 22 May
Source: Competitions

=== Friendlies ===
27 July 1999 Friendly	Stade Nyonnais	0–2	Real Madrid	Nyon, Switzerland
WEST (UTC+01:00)			Congo 30'; Eto'o 83'	Stadium: Centre sportif de Colovray; Referee: M. Tavel

28 July 1999 Friendly	Lausanne-Sport	0–1	Real Madrid	Lausanne, Switzerland
WEST (UTC+01:00)			Morientes 22'	Stadium: Stade Olympique de la Pontaise; Referee: P. Leuba

29 July 1999 Friendly	Espoirs Nyon	0–15	Real Madrid	Nyon, Switzerland
WEST (UTC+01:00)			Sávio 1', 34', 37', 67', 86'; Guti 8', 25', 30'; Congo 18'; Karanka 54'; Rodrigo 63', 75', 86'; Canabal 70', 87'	Stadium: Centre sportif de Colovray; Referee: G. Wildhaber

31 July 1999 Coppa Pirelli	Inter Milan	2–3	Real Madrid	Milan, Italy
WEST (UTC+01:00)	Vieri 30'; Pirlo 90+1'	[ Summary]	Raúl 20'; Morientes 31', 90+3'	Stadium: San Siro; Referee: D. Messino

2 August 1999 Friendly	Fenerbahçe	2–3	Real Madrid	Istanbul, Turkey
WEST (UTC+01:00)	Moshoeu 32'; Tayfun 58'	[ Summary]	Baljić 12'; Morientes 39'; Guti 88'	Stadium: Şükrü Saracoğlu; Referee: Serdar Cakir

7 August 1999 Trofeo Balompédica Linense	Real Madrid	2–1	Red Star	Cádiz, Spain
WEST (UTC+01:00)	Morientes 20'; Hierro 32'	[ Summary]	Pjanović 42'	Stadium: Estadio Municipal de La Línea de la Concepción; Referee: Serdar Cakir

10 August 1999 Trofeo Xacobeo	Real Madrid	0–3	Celta Vigo	Santiago de Compostela, Spain
WEST (UTC+01:00)		[ Summary]	López 20'; McCarthy 30'; Kaviedes 90+1' (pen.)	Stadium: San Lázaro; Referee: Losantos Omar

11 August 1999 Friendly	Real Madrid	2–1	Getafe	Getafe, Spain
WEST (UTC+01:00)	Sávio 43', 50'	[ Summary]	Curras 13'	Stadium: Alfonso Pérez; Referee: Pérez Izquierdo

13 August 1999 Trofeo Cartagena	Real Madrid	1–1	Perugia	Cartagena, Spain
WEST (UTC+01:00)	Morientes 67'	[ Summary]	Materazzi 14'	Stadium: Estadio Cartagonova; Referee: Ansuátegui Roca

14 August 1999 FESTA DÉLX Trophy	Elche	2–4	Real Madrid	Elche, Spain
WEST (UTC+01:00)	Edu García 55' (pen.); Guede 89'	[ Summary]	Hierro 5', 48'; Seedorf 20'; Salgado 82'	Stadium: Manuel Martínez Valero; Referee: Tristante Oliva

24 August 1999 Trofeo Santiago Bernabéu	Real Madrid	4–2	A.C. Milan	Madrid, Spain
WEST (UTC+01:00)	Seedorf 28'; Sávio 72'; McManaman 80'; Helguera 88'	[ Summary]	Gattuso 12'; Orlandini 90+1'	Stadium: Santiago Bernabéu; Referee: García Aranda

22 September 1999 Friendly	Toledo	1–1	Real Madrid	Toledo, Spain
WEST (UTC+01:00)	F. Alvárez	[ Summary]	Baljić (?)	Stadium: Salto del Caballo; Referee: Rubio Iniesta

8 November 1999 Lee Dixon Tribute	Arsenal	3–1	Real Madrid	London, England
WEST (UTC+01:00)	Vieira 13'; Bergkamp 41'; Malz 72'	[ Summary]	Karembeu 74'	Stadium: Highbury; Referee: Dermot Gallagher

30 December 1999 Says 'NO' To Drugs Match	Real Madrid	3–2	LaLiga Team	Madrid, Spain
WEST (UTC+01:00)	Anelka 4'; Guti 28'; Morientes 87'	[ Summary]	Catanha 21'; Ríos 82'	Stadium: Santiago Bernabéu; Referee: Esquinas Torres

31 May 2000 Friendly	Las Palmas	2–0	Real Madrid	Las Palmas, Spain
WEST (UTC+01:00)	Olías; Renaldo	[ Summary]		Stadium: Insular; Referee: Alexis Pérez

=== La Liga ===
==== Results summary ====
Overall								Home						Away					
Pld	W	D	L	GF	GA	GD	Pts	W	D	L	GF	GA	GD	W	D	L	GF	GA	GD
38	16	14	8	58	48	+10	62	9	4	6	31	27	+4	7	10	2	27	21	+6

Source: LFP

==== League table ====
Pos	Team	Pld	W	D	L	GF	GA	GD	Pts	Qualification or relegation
3	Valencia	38	18	10	10	59	39	+20	64 (Note: VAL 3–1 BAR; BAR 3–0 VAL)	Qualification for the Champions League third qualifying round
4	Zaragoza	38	16	15	7	60	40	+20	63	Qualification for the UEFA Cup first round (Note: Real Madrid qualified directly for the 2000–01 UEFA Champions League as holders. As a result, Zaragoza lost their spot in the UEFA Champions League and had to participate in the UEFA Cup.)
5	Real Madrid	38	16	14	8	58	48	+10	62	Qualification for the Champions League group stage
6	Alavés	38	17	10	11	41	37	+4	61	Qualification for the UEFA Cup first round
7	Celta Vigo	38	15	8	15	45	43	+2	53 (Note: VLD 3–3 CEL; CEL 1–1 VLD)	Qualification for the Intertoto Cup third round

Source: LFP
Rules for classification: 1) points; 2) head-to-head points; 3) head-to-head goal difference; 4) head-to-head goals scored; 5) goal difference; 6) number of goals scored.

==== Results by round ====
Round	1	2	3	4	5	6	7	8	9	10	11	12	13	14	15	16	17	18	19	20	21	22	23	24	25	26	27	28	29	30	31	32	33	34	35	36	37	38
Ground	A	H	A	H	A	H	A	H	A	H	A	H	A	H	A	H	A	H	A	H	A	H	A	H	A	H	A	H	A	H	A	H	A	H	A	H	A	H
Result	W	W	D	D	D	L	D	D	D	L	W	D	L	L	D	W	W	W	W	W	D	W	L	W	D	W	D	W	D	D	D	W	W	L	W	L	W	L
Position	5	1	4	5	3	8	8	8	9	9	8	8	9	11	16	16	12	9	6	4	4	4	4	3	4	3	3	3	5	4	4	4	2	4	4	6	4	5

Updated to match(es) played on 2008-07-16. Source: LFP.com
A = Away; H = Home; W = Win; D = Draw; L = Loss; = Leader, 2000-01 UEFA Champions League Group stage; = 2000-01 UEFA Champions League Group stage; = 2000-01 UEFA Champions League Qualifying round; = 2000-01 UEFA Cup; = 2000-01 Segunda Division

==== Matches ====
20 August 1999 1	Mallorca	1–2	Real Madrid	Palma
	Carlitos 52'		Morientes 89'; Raúl 90'	Stadium: Son Moix

27 August 1999 2	Real Madrid	4–1	Numancia	Madrid
	Rocha 46' (o.g.); Sávio 62'; McManaman 69'; Hierro 89' (pen.)		Morán 90'	Stadium: Santiago Bernabéu

11 September 1999 3	Athletic Bilbao	2–2	Real Madrid	Bilbao
	Guerrero 15'; Geremi 41' (o.g.)		McManaman 20'; Guti 76'	Stadium: San Mamés

17 September 1999 4	Real Madrid	1–1	Deportivo	Madrid
	Raúl 82'		Djalminha 47'	Stadium: Santiago Bernabéu

24 September 1999 5	Málaga	1–1	Real Madrid	Málaga
	Larrainzar 57'		Rufete 45' (o.g.)	Stadium: La Rosaleda

2 October 1999 6	Real Madrid	2–3	Valencia	Madrid
	Morientes 46', 65'		Mendieta 11' (pen.); Gerard 23'; C. López 39'	Stadium: Santiago Bernabéu

12 October 1999 7	Barcelona	2–2	Real Madrid	Barcelona
	Rivaldo 28'; Figo 49'		Raúl 29', 86'	Stadium: Camp Nou

15 October 1999 8	Real Madrid	2–2	Oviedo	Madrid
	Morientes 12'; Sávio 28'		Losada 26'; Pompei 83'	Stadium: Santiago Bernabéu

22 October 1999 9	Sevilla	1–1	Real Madrid	Sevilla
	Tsiartas 20'		Raúl 82'	Stadium: Ramón Sánchez Pizjuán

29 October 1999 10	Real Madrid	1–3	Atlético Madrid	Madrid
	Morientes 8'		Hasselbaink 13', 39'; José Mari 30'	Stadium: Santiago Bernabéu

5 November 1999 11	Rayo Vallecano	2–3	Real Madrid	Madrid
	Ferrón 22'; Canabal 28'		Morientes 46'; Hierro 62' (pen.); Raúl 85'	Stadium: Campo de Fútbol de Vallecas

20 November 1999 12	Real Madrid	1–1	Real Sociedad	Madrid
	Sávio 67'		Pikabea 77'	Stadium: Santiago Bernabéu

27 November 1999 13	Celta Vigo	1–0	Real Madrid	Vigo
	Celades 38'			Stadium: Balaídos

3 December 1999 14	Real Madrid	1–5	Real Zaragoza	Madrid
	Raúl 53'		Milošević 29', 68'; Juanele 39', 45'; Garitano 54'	Stadium: Santiago Bernabéu

11 December 1999 15	Racing Santander	1–1	Real Madrid	Santander
	Vivar Dorado 82'		Raúl 23'	Stadium: El Sardinero

17 December 1999 16	Real Madrid	2–1	Espanyol	Madrid
	Raúl 42'; Hierro 53'		Benítez 25'	Stadium: Santiago Bernabéu

20 December 1999 17	Alavés	1–3	Real Madrid	Vitoria-Gasteiz
	Morales 90'		Hierro 38'; Guti 78'; Raúl 86'	Stadium: Mendizorrotza

16 January 2000 20	Real Madrid	2–1	Mallorca	Madrid
	Raúl 83'; Roberto Carlos 90'		Ruiz 37'	Stadium: Santiago Bernabéu

22 January 2000 21	Numancia	0–0	Real Madrid	Soria
				Stadium: Los Pajaritos

25 January 2000 18	Real Madrid	2–1	Betis	Madrid
	Guti 48'; Morientes 78'		Prats 84'	Stadium: Santiago Bernabéu

29 January 2000 22	Real Madrid	3–1	Athletic Bilbao	Madrid
	Guti 40'; Morientes 60'; Raúl 84'		Etxeberria 45'	Stadium: Santiago Bernabéu

6 February 2000 23	Deportivo	5–2	Real Madrid	A Coruña
	Makaay 7'; Djalminha 18'; Víctor 48'; Flores 74', 84'		Morientes 36'; Hierro 89'	Stadium: Riazor

11 February 2000 24	Real Madrid	1–0	Málaga	Madrid
	Zárate 48'			Stadium: Santiago Bernabéu

14 February 2000 19	Valladolid	0–1	Real Madrid	Valladolid
			Meca 86'	Stadium: José Zorrilla

19 February 2000 25	Valencia	1–1	Real Madrid	Valencia
	Ilie 35'		Guti 58'	Stadium: Mestalla

26 February 2000 26	Real Madrid	3–0	Barcelona	Madrid
	Roberto Carlos 5'; Anelka 23'; Morientes 53'			Stadium: Santiago Bernabéu

3 March 2000 27	Oviedo	1–1	Real Madrid	Oviedo
	J. González 83'		Raúl 75'	Stadium: Carlos Tartiere

10 March 2000 28	Real Madrid	3–1	Sevilla	Madrid
	Raúl 15'; Guti 28'; Morientes 33'		Juan Carlos 90'	Stadium: Santiago Bernabéu

17 March 2000 29	Atlético Madrid	1–1	Real Madrid	Madrid
	Solari 45'		Morientes 34'	Stadium: Vicente Calderón

24 March 2000 30	Real Madrid	0–0	Rayo Vallecano	Madrid
				Stadium: Santiago Bernabéu

31 March 2000 31	Real Sociedad	1–1	Real Madrid	San Sebastián
	De Paula 57'		Sávio 3'	Stadium: Anoeta Stadium

8 April 2000 32	Real Madrid	1–0	Celta Vigo	Madrid
	Raúl 68'			Stadium: Santiago Bernabéu

14 April 2000 33	Real Zaragoza	0–1	Real Madrid	Zaragoza
			Raúl 85' (pen.)	Stadium: La Romareda

21 April 2000 34	Real Madrid	2–4	Racing Santander	Madrid
	Roberto Carlos 23'; McManaman 56'		Manjarín 29'; Dorado 33'; Salva 55', 74' (pen.)	Stadium: Santiago Bernabéu

28 April 2000 35	Espanyol	0–2	Real Madrid	Barcelona
			Baljić 47'; Raúl 78' (pen.)	Stadium: Olímpic Lluís Companys

5 May 2000 36	Real Madrid	0–1	Alavés	Madrid
			Azkoitia 88'	Stadium: Santiago Bernabéu

13 May 2000 37	Betis	0–2	Real Madrid	Seville
			Roberto Carlos 31'; Anelka 66'	Stadium: Benito Villamarín

18 May 2000 38	Real Madrid	0–1	Valladolid	Madrid
			Víctor 21'	Stadium: Santiago Bernabéu

=== Copa del Rey ===
19 January 2000 Round 16 1st leg	Real Zaragoza	0–0	Real Madrid	Zaragoza
CET (UTC+1)		[ Report]		Stadium: La Romareda

3 February 2000 Round 16 2nd leg	Real Madrid	2–0 (2–0 agg.)	Real Zaragoza	Madrid
CET (UTC+1)	Guti 1'; Ognjenović 56'	[ Report]		Stadium: Santiago Bernabéu

9 February 2000 Quarter-final 1st leg	Real Madrid	1–0	Mérida	Madrid
CET (UTC+1)	Zárate 52'	Report		Stadium: Santiago Bernabéu; Attendance: 15,000; Referee: Juan Fernández Marín

17 February 2000 Quarter-final 2nd leg	Mérida	2–1 (a.e.t.) (2–2 a agg.)	Real Madrid	Mérida
CET (UTC+1)	de Quintana 42'; Prieto 119'	[ Report]	Zárate 104'	Stadium: Romano

12 April 2000 Semi-final 1st leg	Real Madrid	0–0	Espanyol	Madrid
CET (UTC+1)		[ Report]		Stadium: Santiago Bernabéu

26 April 2000 Semi-final 2nd leg	Espanyol	1–0 (1–0 agg.)	Real Madrid	Barcelona
CET (UTC+1)	Posse 29'	[ Report]		Stadium: Olímpic Lluís Companys

=== Champions League ===
==== First Group stage ====
Pos	Team	Pld	W	D	L	GF	GA	GD	Pts	Qualification
1	(Spain) Real Madrid	6	4	1	1	15	7	+8	13	Advance to second group stage
2	(Portugal) Porto	6	4	0	2	9	6	+3	12	Advance to second group stage
3	(Greece) Olympiacos	6	2	1	3	9	12	−3	7	Transfer to UEFA Cup
4	(Norway) Molde	6	1	0	5	6	14	−8	3	

Source: UEFA

15 September 1999 1	Olympiacos (Greece)	3–3	(Spain) Real Madrid	Athens, Greece
20:45 CEST (UTC+2)	Giovanni 11', 64'; Zahovič 67'	Report	Sávio 24'; Roberto Carlos 32'; Raúl 80'	Stadium: Olympic Stadium; Attendance: 70,000; Referee: Mario van der Ende (Netherlands)

21 September 1999 2	Real Madrid (Spain)	4–1	(Norway) Molde	Madrid, Spain
20:45 CEST (UTC+2)	Morientes 27'; Sávio 60', 64' (pen.); Guti 81'	Report	Lindbæk 69'	Stadium: Santiago Bernabéu; Attendance: 15,000; Referee: Hartmut Strampe (Germany)

28 September 1999 3	Real Madrid (Spain)	3–1	(Portugal) Porto	Madrid, Spain
20:45 CEST (UTC+2)	Morientes 22'; Helguera 37'; Hierro 67' (pen.)	Report	Jardel 23'	Stadium: Santiago Bernabéu; Attendance: 41,000; Referee: Pierluigi Collina (Italy)

20 October 1999 4	Porto (Portugal)	2–1	(Spain) Real Madrid	Porto, Portugal
20:45 CET (UTC+1)	Jardel 13', 35'	Report	Peixe 68' (o.g.)	Stadium: Estádio das Antas; Attendance: 36,550; Referee: Bernd Heynemann (Germany)

26 October 1999 5	Real Madrid (Spain)	3–0	(Greece) Olympiacos	Madrid, Spain
20:45 CET (UTC+1)	Raúl 21'; Morientes 64'; Roberto Carlos 83'	Report		Stadium: Santiago Bernabéu; Attendance: 23,000; Referee: Markus Merk (Germany)

3 November 1999 6	Molde (Norway)	0–1	(Spain) Real Madrid	Molde, Norway
20:45 CET (UTC+1)		Report	Karembeu 43'	Stadium: Molde Stadium; Attendance: 10,785; Referee: Gilles Veissière (France)

==== Second Group stage ====
Pos	Team	Pld	W	D	L	GF	GA	GD	Pts	Qualification
1	(Germany) Bayern Munich	6	4	1	1	13	8	+5	13	Advance to knockout stage
2	(Spain) Real Madrid	6	3	1	2	11	12	−1	10	Advance to knockout stage
3	(Ukraine) Dynamo Kyiv	6	3	1	2	10	8	+2	10	
4	(Norway) Rosenborg	6	0	1	5	5	11	−6	1	

Source: UEFA

24 November 1999 1	Dynamo Kyiv (Ukraine)	1–2	(Spain) Real Madrid	Kyiv, Ukraine
19:45 CET (UTC+1)	Rebrov 86' (pen.)	Report	Morientes 17'; Raúl 48'	Stadium: Lobanovsky Dynamo Stadium; Attendance: 40,000; Referee: David Elleray (England)

7 December 1999 2	Real Madrid (Spain)	3–1	(Norway) Rosenborg	Madrid, Spain
20:45 CET (UTC+1)	Raúl 16'; Sávio 85'; Roberto Carlos 90'	Report	Carew 48'	Stadium: Santiago Bernabéu; Attendance: 35,000; Referee: Michel Piraux (Belgium)

1 March 2000 3	Real Madrid (Spain)	2–4	(Germany) Bayern Munich	Madrid, Spain
20:45 CET (UTC+1)	Morientes 25'; Raúl 48'	Report	Scholl 21'; Effenberg 24'; Fink 39'; Paulo Sérgio 67'	Stadium: Santiago Bernabéu; Attendance: 60,000; Referee: Kim Milton Nielsen (Denmark)

8 March 2000 4	Bayern Munich (Germany)	4–1	(Spain) Real Madrid	Munich, Germany
20:45 CET (UTC+1)	Scholl 4'; Élber 30'; Zickler 79', 90'	Report	Helguera 50'	Stadium: Olympiastadion; Attendance: 60,000; Referee: Dick Jol (Netherlands)

14 March 2000 5	Real Madrid (Spain)	2–2	(Ukraine) Dynamo Kyiv	Madrid, Spain
20:45 CET (UTC+1)	Raúl 14' (pen.); Roberto Carlos 72'	Report	Khatskevich 42'; Hierro 56' (o.g.)	Stadium: Santiago Bernabéu; Attendance: 55,000; Referee: Alain Sars (France)

22 March 2000 6	Rosenborg (Norway)	0–1	(Spain) Real Madrid	Trondheim, Norway
20:45 CET (UTC+1)		Report	Raúl 3'	Stadium: Lerkendal Stadion; Attendance: 12,653; Referee: Nikolay Levnikov (Russia)

==== Knockout stage ====
4 April 2000 Quarter-finals 1st leg	Real Madrid (Spain)	0–0	(England) Manchester United	Madrid, Spain
20:45 CET (UTC+1)		Report		Stadium: Santiago Bernabéu; Attendance: 70,000; Referee: Gilles Veissiere (France)

19 April 2000 Quarter-finals 2nd leg	Manchester United (England)	2–3 (2–3 agg.)	(Spain) Real Madrid	Manchester, England
20:45 CET (UTC+1)	Beckham 64'; Scholes 88' (pen.)	Report	Keane 21' (o.g.); Raúl 50', 52'	Stadium: Old Trafford; Attendance: 61,000; Referee: Pierluigi Collina (Italy)

3 May 2000 Semi-finals 1st leg	Real Madrid (Spain)	2–0	(Germany) Bayern Munich	Madrid, Spain
20:45 CET (UTC+1)	Anelka 4'; Jeremies 33' (o.g.)	Report		Stadium: Santiago Bernabéu; Attendance: 95,000; Referee: Anders Frisk (Sweden)

9 May 2000 Semi-finals 2nd leg	Bayern Munich (Germany)	2–1 (2–3 agg.)	(Spain) Real Madrid	Munich, Germany
20:45 CET (UTC+1)	Jancker 12'; Élber 54'	Report	Anelka 31'	Stadium: Olympiastadion; Attendance: 60,000; Referee: Graham Poll (England)

==== Final ====
24 May 2000	Real Madrid (Spain)	3–0	(Spain) Valencia	Stade de France, Saint-Denis
20:45 CEST	Morientes 39'; McManaman 67'; Raúl 75'	Report		Attendance: 78,759; Referee: Stefano Braschi (Italy)

=== FIFA Club World Championship ===
==== Group stage ====
Pos	Team	Pld	W	D	L	GF	GA	GD	Pts	Qualification
1	(Brazil) Corinthians	3	2	1	0	6	2	+4	7	Advance to final
2	(Spain) Real Madrid	3	2	1	0	8	5	+3	7	Advance to match for third place
3	(Saudi Arabia) Al-Nassr	3	1	0	2	5	8	−3	3	
4	(Morocco) Raja Casablanca	3	0	0	3	5	9	−4	0	

Source: FIFA

5 January 2000 1	Real Madrid (Spain)	3–1	(Saudi Arabia) Al-Nassr	São Paulo, Brazil
19:45 CET (UTC+1)	Anelka 21'; Raúl 61'; Sávio 69' (pen.)	Report	Al-Husseini 45+1' (pen.)	Stadium: Estádio do Morumbi; Attendance: 12,000; Referee: Óscar Ruiz (Colombia)

7 January 2000 2	Real Madrid (Spain)	2–2	(Brazil) Corinthians	São Paulo, Brazil
19:45 CET (UTC+1)	Anelka 19', 71'	Report	Edílson 28', 64'	Stadium: Estádio do Morumbi; Attendance: 55,000; Referee: William Mattus (Costa Rica)

10 January 2000 3	Real Madrid (Spain)	3–2	(Morocco) Raja Casablanca	São Paulo, Brazil
19:45 CET (UTC+1)	Hierro 49'; Morientes 53'; Geremi 88'	Report	Achami 28'; Moustaoudia 59'	Stadium: Estádio do Morumbi; Attendance: 18,000; Referee: Horacio Elizondo (Argentina)

==== Third-place play-off ====
14 January 2000	Real Madrid (Spain)	1–1 (a.e.t.) (3–4 p)	(Mexico) Necaxa	Rio de Janeiro, Brazil
20:00 CET (UTC+1)	Raúl 15'	Report	Delgado 58'	Stadium: Estádio do Maracanã; Attendance: 35,000; Referee: Óscar Ruiz (Colombia)
	Penalties
	Eto'o (penalty scored); Helguera (penalty scored); McManaman (penalty missed); Morientes (penalty scored); Dorado (penalty missed)		(penalty scored) Vázquez; (penalty missed) Cabrera; (penalty scored) Pérez; (penalty scored) Aguinaga; (penalty scored) Delgado

== Squad statistics ==
=== Players statistics ===
No.	Pos	Nat	Player	Total		La Liga		Copa del Rey		Champions League	
No.	Pos	Nat	Player	Apps	Goals	Apps	Goals	Apps	Goals	Apps	Goals
27	GK	(Spain) ESP	Casillas	44	-45	27	-25	5	-1	12	-19
2	DF	(Spain) ESP	Salgado	48	0	28+1	0	4	0	14+1	0
15	DF	(Spain) ESP	Helguera	54	2	27+6	0	6	0	13+2	2
18	DF	(Spain) ESP	Karanka	36	0	19+3	0	3	0	9+2	0
3	DF	(Brazil) BRA	Roberto Carlos	55	8	35	4	3	0	17	4
8	MF	(England) ENG	McManaman	46	4	19+9	3	4+1	0	10+3	1
6	MF	(Argentina) ARG	Redondo	50	0	30	0	4+1	0	15	0
14	MF	(Spain) ESP	Guti	42	8	21+7	6	4	1	7+3	1
11	MF	(Brazil) BRA	Sávio	38	8	23+2	4	2	0	9+2	4
7	FW	(Spain) ESP	Raúl	53	27	32+2	17	4	0	15	10
9	FW	(Spain) ESP	Morientes	48	18	28+1	12	5	0	14	6
13	GK	(Argentina) ARG	Bizzarri	11	-16	7	-14	0	0	4	-2
23	DF	(Brazil) BRA	Júlio César	32	0	20+1	0	1+1	0	7+2	0
4	DF	(Spain) ESP	Hierro	32	6	19+1	5	2	0	9+1	1
12	DF	(Spain) ESP	Iván Campo	36	0	17+3	0	4	0	9+3	0
21	MF	(Cameroon) CMR	Geremi	30	0	15+5	0	2	0	7+1	0
19	FW	(France) FRA	Anelka	30	4	12+7	2	0+1	0	6+4	2
22	MF	(France) FRA	Karembeu	25	1	10+5	0	4+1	0	3+2	1
10	MF	(Netherlands) NED	Seedorf	16	0	8+2	0	0	0	3+3	0
5	DF	(Spain) ESP	Sanchís	21	0	5+9	0	2	0	1+4	0
1	GK	(Germany) GER	Illgner	7	-13	5	-9	1	-2	1	-2
20	FW	(Bosnia and Herzegovina) BIH	Baljic	18	1	3+8	1	0+2	0	0+5	0
25	FW	(Federal Republic of Yugoslavia) YUG	Ognjenovic	18	1	3+8	0	2+3	1	0+2	0
36	FW	(Argentina) ARG	Zarate	9	1	3+3	1	0+3	0	0	0
31	FW	(Spain) ESP	Meca	14	1	1+9	1	1+2	0	0+1	0
16	FW	(Cameroon) CMR	Eto'o	5	0	0+2	0	0	0	0+3	0
17	DF	(Spain) ESP	Dorado	6	0	1+1	0	3+1	0	0	0
38	FW	(Spain) ESP	Fernando	1	0	1	0	0	0	0	0
24	MF	(Spain) ESP	Alvaro	0	0	0	0	0	0	0	0
34	MF	(Spain) ESP	Aganzo	5	0	0+4	0	0	0	1	0
26	FW	(Spain) ESP	Aranda	1	0	0	0	0	0	1	0

- Source: https://www.bdfutbol.com/en/t/t1999-002.html

=== Goal scorers ===
Place	Position	Nation	Number	Name	La Liga	Copa del Rey	UEFA Champions League	FIFA Club World Championship	Total
1	FW	(Spain)	7	Raúl	17	0	10	2	29
2	FW	(Spain)	9	Fernando Morientes	12	0	6	1	19
3	MF	(Brazil)	11	Sávio	4	0	4	1	9
4	DF	(Brazil)	3	Roberto Carlos	4	0	4	0	8
4	MF	(Spain)	14	Guti	6	1	1	0	8
6	FW	(France)	19	Nicolas Anelka	2	0	2	3	7
6	DF	(Spain)	4	Fernando Hierro	5	0	1	1	7
8				Own goal	2	0	3	0	5
9	MF	(England)	8	Steve McManaman	3	0	1	0	4
10	FW	(Argentina)	36	Rolando Zárate	1	2	0	0	3
11	DF	(Spain)	15	Ivan Helguera	0	0	2	0	2
12	FW	(Bosnia and Herzegovina)	20	Elvir Baljić	1	0	0	0	1
12	FW	(Spain)	31	Meca	1	0	0	0	1
12	FW	(Federal Republic of Yugoslavia)	25	Perica Ognjenović	0	1	0	0	1
12	MF	(France)	22	Christian Karembeu	0	0	1	0	1
12	DF	(Cameroon)	21	Geremi	0	0	0	1	1
				TOTALS	58	4	35	9	106

== See also ==
- 1999–2000 La Liga
- 1999–2000 Copa del Rey
- 1999–2000 UEFA Champions League
- 2000 UEFA Champions League Final
- 2000 FIFA Club World Championship
