= Hertha BSC in European football =

- Club: Hertha BSC
- Seasons played: 14
- First entry: 1971–72 UEFA Cup
- Latest entry: 2017–18 UEFA Europa League

Hertha, Berliner Sport-Club e.V., commonly known as Hertha BSC (German pronunciation: [ˈhɛʁtaː beː ʔɛs t͡seː]), Hertha Berlin or simply Hertha, is a German association football club based in the Charlottenburg locality of Berlin.

This is the list of all Hertha Berlin's European matches.

== Overall record ==
Accurate as of 10 December 2017

| Competition | Pld | W | D | L | GF | GA | GD | Win % |
|---|---|---|---|---|---|---|---|---|
| UEFA Champions League | 14 | 3 | 5 | 6 | 11 | 19 | −8 | 21.43 |
| UEFA Cup / UEFA Europa League | 80 | 37 | 21 | 22 | 102 | 73 | +29 | 46.25 |
| UEFA Intertoto Cup | 2 | 1 | 1 | 0 | 2 | 0 | +2 | 50.00 |
| Total | 96 | 41 | 27 | 28 | 115 | 92 | +23 | 42.71 |

Source: UEFA.com

=== By country ===
| Country | Pld | W | D | L | GF | GA | GD | Win % |
|---|---|---|---|---|---|---|---|---|
| Belgium | 2 | 2 | 0 | 0 | 3 | 0 | +3 | 100.00 |
| Bulgaria | 2 | 1 | 1 | 0 | 2 | 1 | +1 | 50.00 |
| Cyprus | 6 | 5 | 1 | 0 | 11 | 1 | +10 | 83.33 |
| Czech Republic | 4 | 1 | 2 | 1 | 4 | 4 | +0 | 25.00 |
| Denmark | 8 | 3 | 1 | 4 | 13 | 11 | +2 | 37.50 |
| England | 4 | 2 | 1 | 1 | 4 | 4 | +0 | 50.00 |
| Finland | 2 | 2 | 0 | 0 | 6 | 2 | +4 | 100.00 |
| France | 1 | 0 | 1 | 0 | 0 | 0 | +0 | 0.00 |
| Georgia | 4 | 2 | 1 | 1 | 5 | 3 | +2 | 50.00 |
| Greece | 1 | 0 | 0 | 1 | 0 | 4 | −4 | 0.00 |
| Ireland | 2 | 1 | 1 | 0 | 2 | 0 | +2 | 50.00 |
| Italy | 7 | 2 | 3 | 2 | 7 | 8 | −1 | 28.57 |
| Latvia | 2 | 1 | 1 | 0 | 2 | 1 | +1 | 50.00 |
| Moldova | 4 | 3 | 1 | 0 | 12 | 2 | +10 | 75.00 |
| Netherlands | 4 | 2 | 0 | 2 | 5 | 7 | −2 | 50.00 |
| Norway | 2 | 2 | 0 | 0 | 3 | 0 | +3 | 100.00 |
| Poland | 4 | 1 | 2 | 1 | 4 | 3 | +1 | 25.00 |
| Portugal | 9 | 2 | 2 | 5 | 6 | 12 | −6 | 22.22 |
| Romania | 3 | 0 | 1 | 2 | 0 | 3 | −3 | 0.00 |
| Russia | 2 | 1 | 1 | 0 | 2 | 0 | +2 | 50.00 |
| Scotland | 2 | 1 | 1 | 0 | 1 | 0 | +1 | 50.00 |
| Serbia | 2 | 1 | 0 | 1 | 2 | 2 | +0 | 50.00 |
| Slovenia | 2 | 2 | 0 | 0 | 3 | 0 | +3 | 100.00 |
| Spain | 4 | 0 | 2 | 2 | 4 | 7 | −3 | 0.00 |
| Sweden | 5 | 3 | 1 | 1 | 9 | 4 | +5 | 60.00 |
| Switzerland | 2 | 0 | 1 | 1 | 0 | 3 | −3 | 0.00 |
| Turkey | 3 | 0 | 1 | 2 | 3 | 7 | −4 | 0.00 |
| Ukraine | 3 | 1 | 1 | 1 | 3 | 2 | +1 | 33.33 |

== Results ==
| Season | Competition | Round | Club | Home | Away | Aggregate | Reference |
|---|---|---|---|---|---|---|---|
| 1971–72 | UEFA Cup | First Round | (Sweden) Elfsborg | 3–1 | 4–1 | 7–2 | |
| 1971–72 | UEFA Cup | Second Round | (Italy) Milan | 2–1 | 2–4 | 4–5 | |
| 1975–76 | UEFA Cup | First Round | (Finland) HJK Helsinki | 4–1 | 2–1 | 6–2 | |
| 1975–76 | UEFA Cup | Second Round | (Netherlands) Ajax | 1–0 | 1–4 | 2–4 | |
| 1978–79 | UEFA Cup | First Round | (Bulgaria) Botev Plovdiv | 0–0 | 2–1 | 2–1 | |
| 1978–79 | UEFA Cup | Second Round | (Soviet Union) Dinamo Tbilisi | 2–0 | 0–1 | 2–1 | |
| 1978–79 | UEFA Cup | Third Round | (Denmark) Esbjerg | 4–0 | 1–2 | 5–2 | |
| 1978–79 | UEFA Cup | Quarter-finals | (Czechoslovakia) Dukla Prague | 1–1 | 2–1 | 3–2 | |
| 1978–79 | UEFA Cup | Semi-finals | (Socialist Federal Republic of Yugoslavia) Red Star Belgrade | 2–1 | 0–1 | 2–2 (a) | |
| 1999–2000 | UEFA Champions League | Third Qualifying Round | (Cyprus) Anorthosis | 2–0 | 0–0 | 2–0 | |
| 1999–2000 | UEFA Champions League | First Group Stage | (Turkey) Galatasaray | 1–4 | 2–2 | 2nd | |
| 1999–2000 | UEFA Champions League | First Group Stage | (England) Chelsea | 2–1 | 0–2 | 2nd | |
| 1999–2000 | UEFA Champions League | First Group Stage | (Italy) Milan | 1–0 | 1–1 | 2nd | |
| 1999–2000 | UEFA Champions League | Second Group Stage | (Spain) Barcelona | 1–1 | 1–3 | 4th | |
| 1999–2000 | UEFA Champions League | Second Group Stage | (Portugal) Porto | 0–1 | 0–1 | 4th | |
| 1999–2000 | UEFA Champions League | Second Group Stage | (Czech Republic) Sparta Prague | 1–1 | 0–1 | 4th | |
| 2000–01 | UEFA Cup | First Round | (Moldova) Zimbru Chișinău | 2–0 | 2–1 | 4–1 | |
| 2000–01 | UEFA Cup | Second Round | (Poland) Amica Wronki | 3–1 | 1–1 | 4–2 | |
| 2000–01 | UEFA Cup | Third Round | (Italy) Inter Milan | 0–0 | 1–2 | 1–2 | |
| 2001–02 | UEFA Cup | First Round | (Belgium) Westerlo | 1–0 | 2–0 | 3–0 | |
| 2001–02 | UEFA Cup | Second Round | (Norway) Viking | 2–0 | 1–0 | 3–0 | |
| 2001–02 | UEFA Cup | Third Round | (Switzerland) Servette | 0–3 | 0–0 | 0–3 | |
| 2002–03 | UEFA Cup | First Round | (Scotland) Aberdeen | 1–0 | 0–0 | 1–0 | |
| 2002–03 | UEFA Cup | Second Round | (Cyprus) APOEL | 4–0 | 1–0 | 5–0 | |
| 2002–03 | UEFA Cup | Round of 32 | (England) Fulham | 2–1 | 0–0 | 2–1 | |
| 2002–03 | UEFA Cup | Round of 16 | (Portugal) Boavista | 3–2 | 0–1 | 3–3 (a) | |
| 2003–04 | UEFA Cup | First Round | (Poland) Groclin Grodzisk Wielkopolski | 0–0 | 0–1 | 0–1 | |
| 2005–06 | UEFA Cup | First Round | (Cyprus) APOEL | 3–1 | 1–0 | 4–1 | |
| 2005–06 | UEFA Cup | Group Stage | (Sweden) Halmstad | —N/a | 1–0 | 3rd | |
| 2005–06 | UEFA Cup | Group Stage | (France) Lens | 0–0 | —N/a | 3rd | |
| 2005–06 | UEFA Cup | Group Stage | (Italy) Sampdoria | —N/a | 0–0 | 3rd | |
| 2005–06 | UEFA Cup | Group Stage | (Romania) Steaua București | 0–0 | —N/a | 3rd | |
| 2005–06 | UEFA Cup | Round of 32 | (Romania) Rapid București | 0–1 | 0–2 | 0–3 | |
| 2006–07 | UEFA Intertoto Cup | Third round | (Russia) FC Moscow | 0–0 | 2–0 | 2–0 | |
| 2006–07 | UEFA Cup | Second qualifying round | (Georgia (country)) Ameri Tbilisi | 1–0 | 2–2 | 3–2 | |
| 2006–07 | UEFA Cup | First Round | (Denmark) Odense | 2–2 | 0–1 | 2–3 | |
| 2008–09 | UEFA Cup | First qualifying round | (Moldova) Nistru Otaci | 8–1 | 0–0 | 8–1 | |
| 2008–09 | UEFA Cup | Second qualifying round | (Slovenia) Interblock | 1–0 | 2–0 | 3–0 | |
| 2008–09 | UEFA Cup | First round | (Republic of Ireland) St Patrick's Athletic | 2–0 | 0–0 | 2–0 | |
| 2008–09 | UEFA Cup | Group Stage | (Portugal) Benfica | 1–1 | —N/a | 4th | |
| 2008–09 | UEFA Cup | Group Stage | (Ukraine) Metalist Kharkiv | —N/a | 0–0 | 4th | |
| 2008–09 | UEFA Cup | Group Stage | (Turkey) Galatasaray | 0–1 | —N/a | 4th | |
| 2008–09 | UEFA Cup | Group Stage | (Greece) Olympiacos | —N/a | 0–4 | 4th | |
| 2009–10 | UEFA Europa League | Play-off round | (Denmark) Brøndby | 3–1 | 1–2 | 4–3 | |
| 2009–10 | UEFA Europa League | Group Stage | (Portugal) Sporting CP | 1–0 | 0–1 | 2nd | |
| 2009–10 | UEFA Europa League | Group Stage | (Netherlands) Heerenveen | 0–1 | 3–2 | 2nd | |
| 2009–10 | UEFA Europa League | Group Stage | (Latvia) Ventspils | 1–1 | 1–0 | 2nd | |
| 2009–10 | UEFA Europa League | Round of 32 | (Portugal) Benfica | 1–1 | 0–4 | 1–5 | |
| 2016–17 | UEFA Europa League | Play-off round | (Denmark) Brøndby | 1–0 | 1–3 | 2–3 | |
| 2017–18 | UEFA Europa League | Group Stage | (Spain) Athletic Bilbao | 0–0 | 2–3 | 4th | |
| 2017–18 | UEFA Europa League | Group Stage | (Sweden) Östersund | 1–1 | 0–1 | 4th | |
| 2017–18 | UEFA Europa League | Group Stage | (Ukraine) Zorya Luhansk | 2–0 | 1–2 | 4th | |
