= 1999–2000 UEFA Champions League knockout stage =

The knockout stage of the 1999–2000 UEFA Champions League began on 4 April 2000 and ended with the final at the Stade de France in Saint-Denis on 24 May 2000. The top two teams from each of the four groups in the second group stage competed in the knockout stage. For the quarter-finals, each group winner was randomly drawn against the runner-up from another group, with the group winner hosting the second leg. The four quarter-final winners were then drawn together for the semi-finals, the winners of which contested the final.

== Qualified teams ==
Key to colours
Seeded in quarterfinal draw
Unseeded in quarterfinal draw

Group	Winners (seeded in quarter-final draw)	Runners-up (unseeded in quarter-final draw)
A	(Spain) Barcelona	(Portugal) Porto
B	(England) Manchester United	(Spain) Valencia
C	(Germany) Bayern Munich	(Spain) Real Madrid
D	(Italy) Lazio	(England) Chelsea

== Format ==
Each quarter-final and semi-final was played over two legs, with each team playing one leg at home; the team that scored the most goals over the two legs qualified for the following round. If the two teams scored the same number of goals over the two legs, the team that scored more goals away from home qualified for the next round; if both teams scored the same number of away goals, matches would go to golden goal extra time and then penalties if the teams could not be separated after extra time.

== Bracket ==
Quarter-finals
(Spain) Real Madrid	0	3	3
(England) Manchester United	0	2	2
(Portugal) Porto	1	1	2
(Germany) Bayern Munich	1	2	3
(Spain) Valencia	5	0	5
(Italy) Lazio	2	1	3
(England) Chelsea	3	1	4
(Spain) Barcelona (a.e.t.)	1	5	6

Semi-finals
(Spain) Real Madrid	2	1	3
(Germany) Bayern Munich	0	2	2
(Spain) Valencia	4	1	5
(Spain) Barcelona	1	2	3

Final
24 May – Saint-Denis
(Spain) Real Madrid	3
(Spain) Valencia	0

== Quarter-finals ==
=== Summary ===
Team 1	Agg.	Team 2	1st leg	2nd leg
Real Madrid (Spain)	3–2	(England) Manchester United	0–0	3–2
Porto (Portugal)	2–3	(Germany) Bayern Munich	1–1	1–2
Chelsea (England)	4–6	(Spain) Barcelona	3–1	1–5 (a.e.t.)
Valencia (Spain)	5–3	(Italy) Lazio	5–2	0–1

=== Matches ===
4 April 2000
20:45

Real Madrid (Spain)	0–0	(England) Manchester United
	Report

Santiago Bernabéu, Madrid
Attendance: 62,930
Referee: Gilles Veissiere (France)
19 April 2000
19:45

Manchester United (England)	2–3	(Spain) Real Madrid
Beckham 64'; Scholes 88' (pen.)	Report	Keane 21' (o.g.); Raúl 50', 52'

Old Trafford, Manchester
Attendance: 59,175
Referee: Pierluigi Collina (Italy)

Real Madrid won 3–2 on aggregate.

4 April 2000
19:45

Porto (Portugal)	1–1	(Germany) Bayern Munich
Jardel 47'	Report	Paulo Sérgio 80'

Estádio das Antas, Porto
Attendance: 20,125
Referee: Nikolai Levnikov (Russia)
19 April 2000
20:45

Bayern Munich (Germany)	2–1	(Portugal) Porto
Paulo Sérgio 15'; Linke 90+3'	Report	Jardel 90'

Olympiastadion, Munich
Attendance: 47,000
Referee: Hugh Dallas (Scotland)

Bayern Munich won 3–2 on aggregate.

5 April 2000
19:45

Chelsea (England)	3–1	(Spain) Barcelona
Zola 30'; Flo 34', 38'	Report	Figo 64'

Stamford Bridge, London
Attendance: 33,662
Referee: Markus Merk (Germany)
18 April 2000
20:45

Barcelona (Spain)	5–1 (a.e.t.)	(England) Chelsea
Rivaldo 24', 99' (pen.); Figo 45'; D. García 83'; Kluivert 104'	Report	Flo 60'

Camp Nou, Barcelona
Attendance: 96,249
Referee: Anders Frisk (Sweden)

Barcelona won 6–4 on aggregate.

5 April 2000
20:45

Valencia (Spain)	5–2	(Italy) Lazio
Angulo 2'; Gerard 4', 40', 80'; C. López 90+1'	Report	Inzaghi 28'; Salas 87'

Mestalla, Valencia
Attendance: 41,800
Referee: Kim Milton Nielsen (Denmark)
18 April 2000
20:45

Lazio (Italy)	1–0	(Spain) Valencia
Verón 52'	Report

Stadio Olimpico, Rome
Attendance: 53,135
Referee: Dick Jol (Netherlands)

Valencia won 5–3 on aggregate.

== Semi-finals ==
=== Summary ===
Team 1	Agg.	Team 2	1st leg	2nd leg
Valencia (Spain)	5–3	(Spain) Barcelona	4–1	1–2
Real Madrid (Spain)	3–2	(Germany) Bayern Munich	2–0	1–2

=== Matches ===
2 May 2000
20:45

Valencia (Spain)	4–1	(Spain) Barcelona
Angulo 10', 43'; Mendieta 47' (pen.); C. López 90+2'	Report	Pellegrino 27' (o.g.)

Mestalla, Valencia
Attendance: 46,210
Referee: Urs Meier (Switzerland)
10 May 2000
20:45

Barcelona (Spain)	2–1	(Spain) Valencia
F. de Boer 78'; Cocu 90+2'	Report	Mendieta 69'

Camp Nou, Barcelona
Attendance: 85,377
Referee: Vítor Melo Pereira (Portugal)

Valencia won 5–3 on aggregate.

3 May 2000
20:45

Real Madrid (Spain)	2–0	(Germany) Bayern Munich
Anelka 4'; Jeremies 33' (o.g.)	Report

Santiago Bernabéu, Madrid
Attendance: 64,800
Referee: Anders Frisk (Sweden)
9 May 2000
20:45

Bayern Munich (Germany)	2–1	(Spain) Real Madrid
Jancker 12'; Élber 54'	Report	Anelka 31'

Olympiastadion, Munich
Attendance: 60,234
Referee: Graham Poll (England)

Real Madrid won 3–2 on aggregate.

== Final ==
The final was played on 24 May 2000 at the Stade de France in Saint-Denis, France.

24 May 2000
20:45

Real Madrid (Spain)	3–0	(Spain) Valencia
Morientes 39'; McManaman 67'; Raúl 75'	Report

Stade de France, Saint-Denis
Attendance: 80,000
Referee: Stefano Braschi (Italy)
