= 2000 UEFA Champions League final =

Association football match

- Match programme cover
- Event: 1999–2000 UEFA Champions League
Real Madrid	Valencia
(Spain)	(Spain)
3	0
- Date: 24 May 2000
- Venue: Stade de France, Saint-Denis
- Referee: Stefano Braschi (Italy)
- Attendance: 80,000

The 2000 UEFA Champions League final was a football match that took place on 24 May 2000. The match was played at Stade de France in Saint-Denis, France, to determine the winner of the 1999–2000 UEFA Champions League. Spanish teams Real Madrid (playing in their eleventh final in the competition) and Valencia (in their maiden appearance at this stage) were the participants in the first final in the history of the European Cup or Champions League to feature two clubs from the same country.

Real Madrid won the match 3–0 to claim the trophy for a record-extending eighth time.

== Route to the final ==
(Spain) Real Madrid				Round	(Spain) Valencia			
Opponent	Agg.	1st leg	2nd leg	Qualifying phase	Opponent	Agg.	1st leg	2nd leg
Bye				Third qualifying round	(Israel) Hapoel Haifa	4–0	2–0 (H)	2–0 (A)
Opponent	Result			First group stage	Opponent	Result		
(Greece) Olympiacos	3–3 (A)			Matchday 1	(Scotland) Rangers	2–0 (H)		
(Norway) Molde	4–1 (H)			Matchday 2	(Netherlands) PSV Eindhoven	1–1 (A)		
(Portugal) Porto	3–1 (H)			Matchday 3	(Germany) Bayern Munich	1–1 (A)		
(Portugal) Porto	1–2 (A)			Matchday 4	(Germany) Bayern Munich	1–1 (H)		
(Greece) Olympiacos	3–0 (H)			Matchday 5	(Scotland) Rangers	2–1 (A)		
(Norway) Molde	1–0 (A)			Matchday 6	(Netherlands) PSV Eindhoven	1–0 (H)		
Group E winner: Pos / Team / Pld / Pts; 1 / (Spain) Real Madrid / 6 / 13; 2 / (Portugal) Porto / 6 / 12; 3 / (Greece) Olympiacos / 6 / 7; 4 / (Norway) Molde / 6 / 3; Source: UEFA				Final standings	Group F winner: Pos / Team / Pld / Pts; 1 / (Spain) Valencia / 6 / 12; 2 / (Germany) Bayern Munich / 6 / 9; 3 / (Scotland) Rangers / 6 / 7; 4 / (Netherlands) PSV Eindhoven / 6 / 4; Source: UEFA			
Opponent	Result			Second group stage	Opponent	Result		
(Ukraine) Dynamo Kyiv	2–1 (A)			Matchday 1	(France) Bordeaux	3–0 (H)		
(Norway) Rosenborg	3–1 (H)			Matchday 2	(England) Manchester United	0–3 (A)		
(Germany) Bayern Munich	2–4 (H)			Matchday 3	(Italy) Fiorentina	0–1 (A)		
(Germany) Bayern Munich	1–4 (A)			Matchday 4	(Italy) Fiorentina	2–0 (H)		
(Ukraine) Dynamo Kyiv	2–2 (H)			Matchday 5	(France) Bordeaux	4–1 (A)		
(Norway) Rosenborg	1–0 (A)			Matchday 6	(England) Manchester United	0–0 (H)		
Group C runners-up: Pos / Team / Pld / Pts; 1 / (Germany) Bayern Munich / 6 / 13; 2 / (Spain) Real Madrid / 6 / 10; 3 / (Ukraine) Dynamo Kyiv / 6 / 10; 4 / (Norway) Rosenborg / 6 / 1; Source: UEFA				Final standings	Group B runners-up: Pos / Team / Pld / Pts; 1 / (England) Manchester United / 6 / 13; 2 / (Spain) Valencia / 6 / 10; 3 / (Italy) Fiorentina / 6 / 8; 4 / (France) Bordeaux / 6 / 2; Source: UEFA			
Opponent	Agg.	1st leg	2nd leg	Knockout phase	Opponent	Agg.	1st leg	2nd leg
(England) Manchester United	3–2	0–0 (H)	3–2 (A)	Quarter-finals	(Italy) Lazio	5–3	5–2 (H)	0–1 (A)
(Germany) Bayern Munich	3–2	2–0 (H)	1–2 (A)	Semi-finals	(Spain) Barcelona	5–3	4–1 (H)	1–2 (A)

== Match ==
=== Summary ===
A headed goal from Fernando Morientes in the first half and a spectacular Steve McManaman volley midway through the second half put Real Madrid 2–0 ahead, before Raúl sealed the win with a breakaway third goal, rounding Santiago Cañizares after a Valencia corner was cleared.

The win was Real Madrid's eighth European Cup victory overall and their second in three years, and was notable for being Vicente del Bosque's first title as manager. It was also a landmark for being the first final played between two teams from the same nation. Upon this win, McManaman became the first English player to win the tournament with a non-English club.

=== Details ===
24 May 2000
20:45 UTC+2

Real Madrid (Spain)	3–0	(Spain) Valencia
Morientes 39'; McManaman 67'; Raúl 75'	Report

Stade de France, Saint-Denis
Attendance: 80,000
Referee: Stefano Braschi (Italy)

Real Madrid	Valencia

GK	27	(Spain) Iker Casillas
RB	2	(Spain) Míchel Salgado	(yellow card) 37'	(substituted off) 85'
CB	18	(Spain) Aitor Karanka
CB	15	(Spain) Iván Helguera
LB	3	(Brazil) Roberto Carlos	(yellow card) 59'
RM	8	(England) Steve McManaman
CM	6	(Argentina) Fernando Redondo (c)
CM	12	(Spain) Iván Campo
LM	7	(Spain) Raúl
CF	9	(Spain) Fernando Morientes		(substituted off) 72'
CF	19	(France) Nicolas Anelka		(substituted off) 80'
Substitutes:
GK	1	(Germany) Bodo Illgner
DF	4	(Spain) Fernando Hierro		(substituted on) 85'
DF	5	(Spain) Manolo Sanchís		(substituted on) 80'
MF	11	(Brazil) Sávio		(substituted on) 72'
MF	21	(Cameroon) Geremi
MF	22	(France) Christian Karembeu
FW	20	(Bosnia and Herzegovina) Elvir Baljić
Manager:
(Spain) Vicente del Bosque

GK	1	(Spain) Santiago Cañizares	(yellow card) 63'
RB	20	(France) Jocelyn Angloma
CB	5	(Federal Republic of Yugoslavia) Miroslav Đukić
CB	2	(Argentina) Mauricio Pellegrino	(yellow card) 90+2'
LB	31	(Spain) Gerardo	(yellow card) 38'	(substituted off) 69'
DM	8	(Spain) Javier Farinós	(yellow card) 82'
RM	6	(Spain) Gaizka Mendieta (c)
CM	14	(Spain) Gerard López
LM	18	(Argentina) Kily González
CF	10	(Spain) Miguel Ángel Angulo
CF	7	(Argentina) Claudio López
Substitutes:
GK	13	(Spain) Jorge Bartual
DF	3	(Sweden) Joachim Björklund
MF	9	(Spain) Óscar
MF	21	(Spain) Luis Milla
MF	23	(Spain) David Albelda
FW	11	(Romania) Adrian Ilie		(substituted on) 69'
FW	17	(Spain) Juan Ginés Sánchez
Manager:
(Argentina) Héctor Cúper

Assistant referees:
Gennaro Mazzei (Italy)
Piergiuseppe Farneti (Italy)
Fourth official:
Domenico Messina (Italy)

Match rules

- 90 minutes.
- 30 minutes of golden goal extra time if necessary.
- Penalty shoot-out if no goals occur in extra time.
- Seven named substitutes.
- Maximum of three substitutes.

=== Statistics ===
Statistic	Real Madrid	Valencia
Goals scored	3	0
Total shots	14	6
Shots on target	11	1
Ball possession	53%	47%
Corner kicks	8	10
Fouls committed	9	20
Offsides	1	1
Yellow cards	2	4
Red cards	0	0

== See also ==
- 2000 UEFA Cup final
- 2000 UEFA Super Cup
- 2000 Intercontinental Cup
- 1999–2000 Real Madrid CF season
- 1999–2000 Valencia CF season
- Real Madrid CF in international football
- Spanish football clubs in international competitions
- Valencia CF in European football
