= 1999–2000 UEFA Champions League =

European football tournament

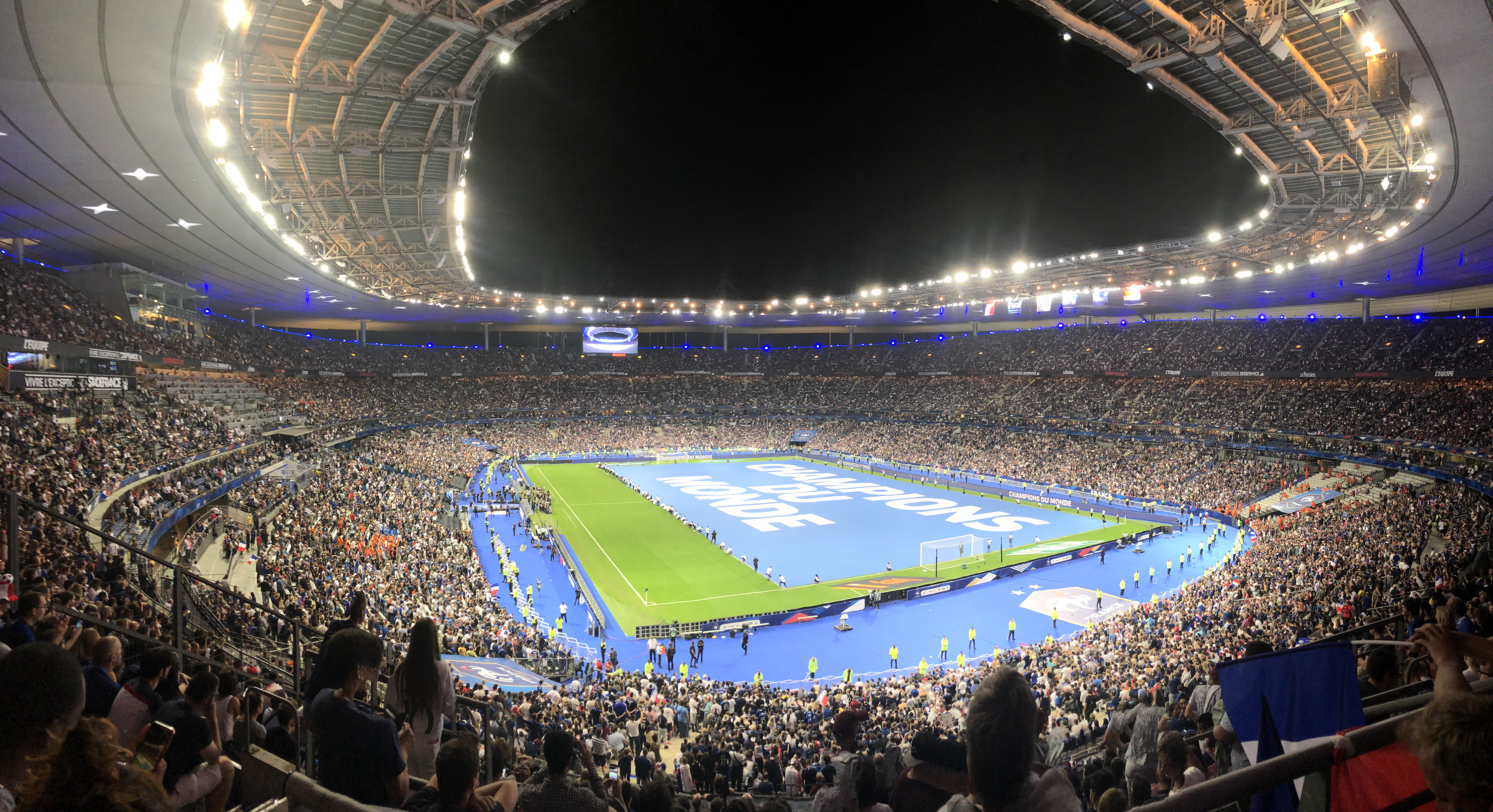
- The Stade de France in Saint-Denis held the final

Tournament details
- Dates: Qualifying: 13 July – 25 August 1999; Competition proper: 14 September 1999 – 24 May 2000
- Teams: Competition proper: 32; Total: 71

Final positions
- Champions: (Spain) Real Madrid (8th title)
- Runners-up: (Spain) Valencia

Tournament statistics
- Matches played: 157
- Goals scored: 442 (2.82 per match)
- Attendance: 5,495,112 (35,001 per match)
- Top scorer(s): Raúl (Real Madrid); Rivaldo (Barcelona); Mário Jardel (Porto); 10 goals each

The 1999–2000 UEFA Champions League was the 45th season of the UEFA Champions League, UEFA's premier European club football tournament, and the eighth season since its rebranding from the "European Champion Clubs' Cup" or "European Cup". The competition was won by Real Madrid, who clinched a historic eighth title win by beating fellow La Liga side Valencia in the final held at the Stade de France in Paris, the city where the original roots of the competition had begun nearly 50 years earlier.

After two years of allowing runners-up of strongest continental leagues to enter, UEFA went even further and expanded the tournament to up to four strongest teams from Europe's top national leagues. As a result, the tournament was a stark contrast from the 1996–97 edition three years earlier where only national champions had participated.

The competition was dominated by Spanish teams, with three of the four semi-finalists coming from that nation: Real Madrid, Valencia and Barcelona. The final between Real Madrid and Valencia marked the first time that both finalists had come from the same country.

Manchester United were the defending champions, but were eliminated by eventual winners Real Madrid in the quarter-finals.

== Changes to the competition format ==
The 1999–2000 edition of the Champions League featured a whole different format to the competition. An additional qualifying round was introduced to generate two group stages, firstly with 32 teams – eight groups of four – who played six matches each to reduce the competition to 16 teams for the second group stage, with the eight third-placed teams moving to the UEFA Cup third round. At the end of the second group stage, eight teams remained to contest the knock-out stage.

== Association team allocation ==
A total of 71 teams participated in the 1999–2000 Champions League, from 47 of 51 UEFA associations. Liechtenstein (who don't have their own league) as well as Andorra and San Marino did not participate. Additionally, Bosnia and Herzegovina were not admitted due to having no nation-wide champion.

Below is the qualification scheme for the 2000–01 UEFA Champions League:

- Associations 1–3 each have four teams qualify
- Associations 4–6 each have three teams qualify
- Associations 7–15 each have two teams qualify
- Associations 16–48 each have one team qualify (except Liechtenstein)

=== Association ranking ===
Countries are allocated places according to their 1998 UEFA league coefficient, which takes into account their performance in European competitions from 1993–94 to 1997–98.

Rank	Association	Coeff.	Teams
1	Italy	59.640	4
2	Germany	49.932	4
3	Spain	48.580	4
4	France	41.433	3
5	Netherlands	35.916	3
6	England	35.566	3
7	Portugal	31.266	2
8	Greece	28.750	2
9	Czech Republic	28.166	2
10	Norway	27.449	2
11	Austria	27.250	2
12	Russia	26.866	2
13	Croatia	26.166	2
14	Turkey	25.650	2
15	Denmark	24.200	2
16	Switzerland	22.250	1
17	Ukraine	22.082	1

Rank	Association	Coeff.	Teams
18	Poland	22.000	1
19	Hungary	21.083	1
20	Belgium	21.000	1
21	Slovakia	20.999	1
22	Romania	20.750	1
23	Sweden	20.600	1
24	Georgia	20.333	1
25	Cyprus	20.332	1
26	Scotland	19.500	1
27	Israel	16.749	1
28	Slovenia	15.998	1
29	Belarus	14.833	1
30	Iceland	13.666	1
31	Finland	13.415	1
32	Latvia	11.498	1
33	Bulgaria	10.499	1
34	Macedonia	8.666	1

Rank	Association	Coeff.	Teams
35	Lithuania	7.333	1
36	FR Yugoslavia	7.083	1
37	Moldova	6.666	1
38	Liechtenstein	5.000	0
39	Estonia	4.999	1
40	Armenia	4.832	1
41	Northern Ireland	4.665	1
42	Malta	4.664	1
43	Wales	3.999	1
44	Republic of Ireland	3.998	1
45	Faroe Islands	2.833	1
46	Albania	2.666	1
47	Luxembourg	2.333	1
48	Azerbaijan	1.833	1
49	Andorra	0.000	0
50	Bosnia and Herzegovina	0.000	0
51	San Marino	0.000	0

=== Distribution ===
The title holders (Manchester United) qualified for the Champions League group stage through their domestic league, thus the group stage spot reserved for the title holders was vacated. Additionally, Bosnia and Herzegovina was not admitted as their play-off for Champions League qualification didn't take place. Due to these factors, the following changes to the default access list are made:

- The champions of association 10 (Norway) are promoted from the third qualifying round to the group stage.
- The champions of association 16 (Switzerland) are promoted from the second qualifying round to the third qualifying round.
- The champions of associations 27, 28 and 29 (Israel, Slovenia and Belarus) are promoted from the first qualifying round to the second qualifying round.

	Teams entering this round	Teams advancing from previous round
First qualifying round (18 teams)	18 champions from associations 30–48 (except Liechtenstein)	
Second qualifying round (28 teams)	13 champions from associations 17–29; 6 runners-up from associations 10–15	9 winners from the first qualifying round
Third qualifying round (32 teams)	6 champions from associations 11–16; 3 runners-up from associations 7–9; 6 third-place finishers from associations 1–6; 3 fourth-place finishers from associations 1–3	14 winners from the second qualifying round
First group stage (32 teams)	10 champions from associations 1–10 (including title holders Manchester United); 6 runners-up from associations 1–6	16 winners from the third qualifying round
Second group stage (16 teams)		8 group winners from the first group stage; 8 group runners-up from the first group stage
Knockout phase (8 teams)		4 group winners from the second group stage; 4 group runners-up from the second group stage

=== Teams ===
League positions of the previous season shown in parentheses (TH: Champions League title holders).

Group stage
(Italy) Milan (1st)	(Spain) Barcelona (1st)	(Netherlands) Feyenoord (1st)	(Portugal) Porto (1st)
(Italy) Lazio (2nd)	(Spain) Real Madrid (2nd)	(Netherlands) Willem II (2nd)	(Greece) Olympiacos (1st)
(Germany) Bayern Munich (1st)	(France) Bordeaux (1st)	(England) Manchester United (1st)^{TH}	(Czech Republic) Sparta Prague (1st)
(Germany) Bayer Leverkusen (2nd)	(France) Marseille (2nd)	(England) Arsenal (2nd)	(Norway) Rosenborg (1st)
Third qualifying round
(Italy) Fiorentina (3rd)	(Spain) Valencia (4th)	(Greece) AEK Athens (2nd)	Croatia Zagreb (1st)
(Italy) Parma (4th)	(France) Lyon (3rd)	(Czech Republic) Teplice (2nd)	(Turkey) Galatasaray (1st)
(Germany) Hertha BSC (3rd)	(Netherlands) PSV Eindhoven (3rd)	(Austria) Sturm Graz (1st)	(Denmark) AaB (1st)
(Germany) Borussia Dortmund (4th)	(England) Chelsea (3rd)	(Russia) Spartak Moscow (1st)	(Switzerland) Servette (1st)
(Spain) Mallorca (3rd)	(Portugal) Boavista (2nd)		
Second qualifying round
(Norway) Molde (2nd)	(Denmark) Brøndby (2nd)	(Slovakia) Slovan Bratislava (1st)	(Scotland) Rangers (1st)
(Austria) Rapid Wien (2nd)	(Ukraine) Dynamo Kyiv (1st)	(Romania) Rapid București (1st)	(Israel) Hapoel Haifa (1st)
(Russia) CSKA Moscow (2nd)	(Poland) Widzew Łódź (2nd)	(Sweden) AIK (1st)	(Slovenia) Maribor (1st)
(Croatia) Rijeka (2nd)	(Hungary) MTK Hungária (1st)	(Georgia (country)) Dinamo Tbilisi (1st)	(Belarus) Dnepr-Transmash Mogilev (1st)
(Turkey) Beşiktaş (2nd)	(Belgium) Genk (1st)	(Cyprus) Anorthosis Famagusta (1st)	
First qualifying round
(Iceland) ÍBV (1st)	(Lithuania) Žalgiris (1st)	(Northern Ireland) Glentoran (1st)	(Faroe Islands) HB (1st)
(Finland) Haka (1st)	(Federal Republic of Yugoslavia) Partizan (1st)	(Malta) Valletta (1st)	(Albania) Tirana (1st)
(Latvia) Skonto (1st)	(Moldova) Zimbru Chișinău (1st)	(Wales) Barry Town (1st)	(Luxembourg) Jeunesse Esch (1st)
(Bulgaria) Litex Lovech (1st)	(Estonia) Flora (1st)	(Republic of Ireland) St Patrick's Athletic (1st)	(Azerbaijan) Kapaz (1st)
(North Macedonia) Sloga Jugomagnat (1st)	(Armenia) Tsement Ararat (1st)		

Notes

1. Poland (POL): Polish champions Wisła Kraków were banned by UEFA due to fan behaviour in the 1998–99 UEFA Cup and replaced by runners-up Widzew Łódź.

== Round and draw dates ==
The schedule of the competition was as follows (all draws were held in Geneva, Switzerland, unless stated otherwise).

Phase	Round	Draw date	First leg	Second leg
Qualifying	First qualifying round	30 June 1999	13–14 July 1999	21 July 1999
Qualifying	Second qualifying round	30 June 1999	28 July 1999	4 August 1999
Qualifying	Third qualifying round	23 July 1999	10–11 August 1999	25 August 1999
First group stage	Matchday 1	26 August 1999 (Monaco)	14–15 September 1999	
First group stage	Matchday 2	26 August 1999 (Monaco)	21–22 September 1999	
First group stage	Matchday 3	26 August 1999 (Monaco)	28–29 September 1999	
First group stage	Matchday 4	26 August 1999 (Monaco)	19–20 October 1999	
First group stage	Matchday 5	26 August 1999 (Monaco)	26–27 October 1999	
First group stage	Matchday 6	26 August 1999 (Monaco)	2–3 November 1999	
Second group stage	Matchday 1	5 November 1999	23–24 November 1999	
Second group stage	Matchday 2	5 November 1999	7–8 December 1999	
Second group stage	Matchday 3	5 November 1999	29 February – 1 March 2000	
Second group stage	Matchday 4	5 November 1999	7–8 March 2000	
Second group stage	Matchday 5	5 November 1999	14–15 March 2000	
Second group stage	Matchday 6	5 November 1999	21–22 March 2000	
Knockout phase	Quarter-finals	24 March 2000	4–5 April 2000	18–19 April 2000
Knockout phase	Semi-finals	24 March 2000	2–3 May 2000	9–10 May 2000
Knockout phase	Final	24 March 2000	24 May 2000 at Stade de France, Saint-Denis	

== Qualifying rounds ==
=== First qualifying round ===
Team 1	Agg.	Team 2	1st leg	2nd leg
ÍBV (Iceland)	3–1	(Albania) Tirana	1–0	2–1
Litex Lovech (Bulgaria)	5–0	(Northern Ireland) Glentoran	3–0	2–0
Žalgiris (Lithuania)	5–0	(Armenia) Tsement Ararat	2–0	3–0
HB (Faroe Islands)	1–7	(Finland) Haka	1–1	0–6
Partizan (Federal Republic of Yugoslavia)	10–1	(Estonia) Flora	6–0	4–1
Jeunesse Esch (Luxembourg)	0–10	(Latvia) Skonto	0–2	0–8
Sloga Jugomagnat (North Macedonia)	2–2 (a)	(Azerbaijan) Kapaz	1–0	1–2
Barry Town (Wales)	2–3	(Malta) Valletta	0–0	2–3
St Patrick's Athletic (Republic of Ireland)	0–10	(Moldova) Zimbru Chișinău	0–5	0–5

=== Second qualifying round ===
Team 1	Agg.	Team 2	1st leg	2nd leg
Rapid Wien (Austria)	5–0	(Malta) Valletta	3–0	2–0
Anorthosis Famagusta (Cyprus)	3–2	(Slovakia) Slovan Bratislava	2–1	1–1
Partizan (Federal Republic of Yugoslavia)	6–1	(Croatia) Rijeka	3–1	3–0
CSKA Moscow (Russia)	2–4	(Norway) Molde	2–0	0–4
Litex Lovech (Bulgaria)	5–5 (2–3 p)	(Poland) Widzew Łódź	4–1	1–4 (a.e.t.)
Haka (Finland)	1–7	(Scotland) Rangers	1–4	0–3
Dinamo Tbilisi (Georgia (country))	2–3	(Moldova) Zimbru Chișinău	2–1	0–2
Dnepr-Transmash Mogilev (Belarus)	0–3	(Sweden) AIK	0–1	0–2
Sloga Jugomagnat (North Macedonia)	0–2	(Denmark) Brøndby	0–1	0–1
Rapid București (Romania)	4–5	(Latvia) Skonto	3–3	1–2
Beşiktaş (Turkey)	1–1 (a)	(Israel) Hapoel Haifa	1–1	0–0
Dynamo Kyiv (Ukraine)	3–0	(Lithuania) Žalgiris	2–0	1–0
ÍBV (Iceland)	1–5	(Hungary) MTK Hungária	0–2	1–3
Maribor (Slovenia)	5–4	(Belgium) Genk	5–1	0–3

=== Third qualifying round ===
The losing teams advanced to the first round of the 1999–2000 UEFA Cup.

Team 1	Agg.	Team 2	1st leg	2nd leg
Zimbru Chișinău (Moldova)	0–2	(Netherlands) PSV Eindhoven	0–0	0–2
Spartak Moscow (Russia)	5–1	(Federal Republic of Yugoslavia) Partizan	2–0	3–1
Chelsea (England)	3–0	(Latvia) Skonto	3–0	0–0
Rapid Wien (Austria)	0–4	(Turkey) Galatasaray	0–3	0–1
Fiorentina (Italy)	5–1	(Poland) Widzew Łódź	3–1	2–0
AaB (Denmark)	3–4	(Ukraine) Dynamo Kyiv	1–2	2–2
Rangers (Scotland)	2–1	(Italy) Parma	2–0	0–1
Brøndby (Denmark)	3–6	(Portugal) Boavista	1–2	2–4 (a.e.t.)
AEK Athens (Greece)	0–1	(Sweden) AIK	0–0	0–1
Hapoel Haifa (Israel)	0–4	(Spain) Valencia	0–2	0–2
Hertha BSC (Germany)	2–0	(Cyprus) Anorthosis Famagusta	2–0	0–0
Sturm Graz (Austria)	4–3	(Switzerland) Servette	2–1	2–2
Molde (Norway)	1–1 (a)	(Spain) Mallorca	0–0	1–1
Lyon (France)	0–3	(Slovenia) Maribor	0–1	0–2
Croatia Zagreb	2–0	(Hungary) MTK Hungária	0–0	2–0
Teplice (Czech Republic)	0–2	(Germany) Borussia Dortmund	0–1	0–1

== First group stage ==
Location of teams of the 1999–2000 UEFA Champions League first group stage.
Brown: Group A; Red: Group B; Orange: Group C; Yellow: Group D;
Green: Group E; Blue: Group F; Purple: Group G; Pink: Group H.

16 winners from the third qualifying round, 10 champions from countries ranked 1–10, and six second-placed teams from countries ranked 1–6 were drawn into eight groups of four teams each. Compared to the two previous seasons, three associations (England, France, The Netherlands) were allowed three teams – the league winner and runner-up from each nation qualified for the first group stage, and the third-placed teams qualified for the third qualifying round – and three associations were allowed four teams (Germany, Italy, Spain) – the league winner and runner-up from each nation qualified for the first group stage, and the third- and fourth-placed teams qualified for the third qualifying round. Nine additional associations were still allowed two teams (Czech Republic, Greece, Norway, Portugal: league winner in group stage; Austria, Croatia, Denmark, Turkey, Russia: league winner in third qualifying round). The top two teams in each group advanced to the Champions League second group stage, while the third-placed teams advanced to round three of the UEFA Cup.

AIK, Boavista, Bordeaux, Chelsea, Fiorentina, Hertha BSC, Lazio, Maribor, Molde, Valencia and Willem II made their debut in the group stage. Maribor was the first Slovenian side to play in group stage. Germany became the first association to have four teams in the Champions League group stage.

Tiebreakers, if necessary, are applied in the following order:

1. Points earned in head-to-head matches between the tied teams.
2. Total goals scored in head-to-head matches between the tied teams.
3. Away goals scored in head-to-head matches between the tied teams.
4. Cumulative goal difference in all group matches.
5. Total goals scored in all group matches.
6. Higher UEFA coefficient going into the competition.

=== Group A ===
Pos	Team	Pld	W	D	L	GF	GA	GD	Pts	Qualification	LAZ	DKV	LEV	MRB
1	(Italy) Lazio	6	4	2	0	13	3	+10	14	Advance to second group stage	—	2–1	1–1	4–0
2	(Ukraine) Dynamo Kyiv	6	2	1	3	8	8	0	7	Advance to second group stage	0–1	—	4–2	0–1
3	(Germany) Bayer Leverkusen	6	1	4	1	7	7	0	7	Transfer to UEFA Cup	1–1	1–1	—	0–0
4	(Slovenia) Maribor	6	1	1	4	2	12	−10	4		0–4	1–2	0–2	—

Source: UEFA

=== Group B ===
Pos	Team	Pld	W	D	L	GF	GA	GD	Pts	Qualification	BAR	FIO	ARS	AIK
1	(Spain) Barcelona	6	4	2	0	19	9	+10	14	Advance to second group stage	—	4–2	1–1	5–0
2	(Italy) Fiorentina	6	2	3	1	9	7	+2	9	Advance to second group stage	3–3	—	0–0	3–0
3	(England) Arsenal	6	2	2	2	9	9	0	8	Transfer to UEFA Cup	2–4	0–1	—	3–1
4	(Sweden) AIK	6	0	1	5	4	16	−12	1		1–2	0–0	2–3	—

Source: UEFA

=== Group C ===
Pos	Team	Pld	W	D	L	GF	GA	GD	Pts	Qualification	ROS	FEY	DOR	BOA
1	(Norway) Rosenborg	6	3	2	1	12	5	+7	11	Advance to second group stage	—	2–2	2–2	2–0
2	(Netherlands) Feyenoord	6	1	5	0	7	6	+1	8	Advance to second group stage	1–0	—	1–1	1–1
3	(Germany) Borussia Dortmund	6	1	3	2	7	9	−2	6	Transfer to UEFA Cup	0–3	1–1	—	3–1
4	(Portugal) Boavista	6	1	2	3	4	10	−6	5		0–3	1–1	1–0	—

Source: UEFA

=== Group D ===
Pos	Team	Pld	W	D	L	GF	GA	GD	Pts	Qualification	MUN	MAR	STM	CZG
1	(England) Manchester United	6	4	1	1	9	4	+5	13	Advance to second group stage	—	2–1	2–1	0–0
2	(France) Marseille	6	3	1	2	10	8	+2	10	Advance to second group stage	1–0	—	2–0	2–2
3	(Austria) Sturm Graz	6	2	0	4	5	12	−7	6	Transfer to UEFA Cup	0–3	3–2	—	1–0
4	Croatia Zagreb	6	1	2	3	7	7	0	5		1–2	1–2	3–0	—

Source: UEFA

=== Group E ===
Pos	Team	Pld	W	D	L	GF	GA	GD	Pts	Qualification	RMA	POR	OLY	MOL
1	(Spain) Real Madrid	6	4	1	1	15	7	+8	13	Advance to second group stage	—	3–1	3–0	4–1
2	(Portugal) Porto	6	4	0	2	9	6	+3	12	Advance to second group stage	2–1	—	2–0	3–1
3	(Greece) Olympiacos	6	2	1	3	9	12	−3	7	Transfer to UEFA Cup	3–3	1–0	—	3–1
4	(Norway) Molde	6	1	0	5	6	14	−8	3		0–1	0–1	3–2	—

Source: UEFA

=== Group F ===
Pos	Team	Pld	W	D	L	GF	GA	GD	Pts	Qualification	VAL	BAY	RAN	PSV
1	(Spain) Valencia	6	3	3	0	8	4	+4	12	Advance to second group stage	—	1–1	2–0	1–0
2	(Germany) Bayern Munich	6	2	3	1	7	6	+1	9	Advance to second group stage	1–1	—	1–0	2–1
3	(Scotland) Rangers	6	2	1	3	7	7	0	7	Transfer to UEFA Cup	1–2	1–1	—	4–1
4	(Netherlands) PSV Eindhoven	6	1	1	4	5	10	−5	4		1–1	2–1	0–1	—

Source: UEFA

=== Group G ===
Pos	Team	Pld	W	D	L	GF	GA	GD	Pts	Qualification	SPP	BOR	SPM	WIL
1	(Czech Republic) Sparta Prague	6	3	3	0	14	6	+8	12	Advance to second group stage	—	0–0	5–2	4–0
2	(France) Bordeaux	6	3	3	0	7	4	+3	12	Advance to second group stage	0–0	—	2–1	3–2
3	(Russia) Spartak Moscow	6	1	2	3	9	12	−3	5	Transfer to UEFA Cup	1–1	1–2	—	1–1
4	(Netherlands) Willem II	6	0	2	4	7	15	−8	2		3–4	0–0	1–3	—

Source: UEFA

=== Group H ===
Pos	Team	Pld	W	D	L	GF	GA	GD	Pts	Qualification	CHE	HER	GAL	MIL
1	(England) Chelsea	6	3	2	1	10	3	+7	11	Advance to second group stage	—	2–0	1–0	0–0
2	(Germany) Hertha BSC	6	2	2	2	7	10	−3	8	Advance to second group stage	2–1	—	1–4	1–0
3	(Turkey) Galatasaray	6	2	1	3	10	13	−3	7	Transfer to UEFA Cup	0–5	2–2	—	3–2
4	(Italy) Milan	6	1	3	2	6	7	−1	6		1–1	1–1	2–1	—

Source: UEFA

== Second group stage ==
Eight winners and eight runners-up from the first group stage were drawn into four groups of four teams each, each containing two group winners and two runners-up. Teams from the same country or from the same first-round group could not be drawn together. The top two teams in each group advanced to the quarter-finals.

=== Group A ===
Pos	Team	Pld	W	D	L	GF	GA	GD	Pts	Qualification	BAR	POR	SPP	HER
1	(Spain) Barcelona	6	5	1	0	17	5	+12	16	Advance to knockout stage	—	4–2	5–0	3–1
2	(Portugal) Porto	6	3	1	2	8	8	0	10	Advance to knockout stage	0–2	—	2–2	1–0
3	(Czech Republic) Sparta Prague	6	1	2	3	5	12	−7	5		1–2	0–2	—	1–0
4	(Germany) Hertha BSC	6	0	2	4	3	8	−5	2		1–1	0–1	1–1	—

Source: UEFA

=== Group B ===
Pos	Team	Pld	W	D	L	GF	GA	GD	Pts	Qualification	MUN	VAL	FIO	BOR
1	(England) Manchester United	6	4	1	1	10	4	+6	13	Advance to knockout stage	—	3–0	3–1	2–0
2	(Spain) Valencia	6	3	1	2	9	5	+4	10	Advance to knockout stage	0–0	—	2–0	3–0
3	(Italy) Fiorentina	6	2	2	2	7	8	−1	8		2–0	1–0	—	3–3
4	(France) Bordeaux	6	0	2	4	5	14	−9	2		1–2	1–4	0–0	—

Source: UEFA

=== Group C ===
Pos	Team	Pld	W	D	L	GF	GA	GD	Pts	Qualification	BAY	RMA	DKV	ROS
1	(Germany) Bayern Munich	6	4	1	1	13	8	+5	13	Advance to knockout stage	—	4–1	2–1	2–1
2	(Spain) Real Madrid	6	3	1	2	11	12	−1	10	Advance to knockout stage	2–4	—	2–2	3–1
3	(Ukraine) Dynamo Kyiv	6	3	1	2	10	8	+2	10		2–0	1–2	—	2–1
4	(Norway) Rosenborg	6	0	1	5	5	11	−6	1		1–1	0–1	1–2	—

Source: UEFA

=== Group D ===
Pos	Team	Pld	W	D	L	GF	GA	GD	Pts	Qualification	LAZ	CHE	FEY	MAR
1	(Italy) Lazio	6	3	2	1	10	4	+6	11	Advance to knockout stage	—	0–0	1–2	5–1
2	(England) Chelsea	6	3	1	2	8	5	+3	10	Advance to knockout stage	1–2	—	3–1	1–0
3	(Netherlands) Feyenoord	6	2	2	2	7	7	0	8		0–0	1–3	—	3–0
4	(France) Marseille	6	1	1	4	2	11	−9	4		0–2	1–0	0–0	—

Source: UEFA

== Knockout stage ==
=== Bracket ===
Quarter-finals
(Spain) Real Madrid	0	3	3
(England) Manchester United	0	2	2
(Portugal) Porto	1	1	2
(Germany) Bayern Munich	1	2	3
(Spain) Valencia	5	0	5
(Italy) Lazio	2	1	3
(England) Chelsea	3	1	4
(Spain) Barcelona (a.e.t.)	1	5	6

Semi-finals
(Spain) Real Madrid	2	1	3
(Germany) Bayern Munich	0	2	2
(Spain) Valencia	4	1	5
(Spain) Barcelona	1	2	3

Final
24 May – Saint-Denis
(Spain) Real Madrid	3
(Spain) Valencia	0

=== Quarter-finals ===
Team 1	Agg.	Team 2	1st leg	2nd leg
Real Madrid (Spain)	3–2	(England) Manchester United	0–0	3–2
Porto (Portugal)	2–3	(Germany) Bayern Munich	1–1	1–2
Chelsea (England)	4–6	(Spain) Barcelona	3–1	1–5 (a.e.t.)
Valencia (Spain)	5–3	(Italy) Lazio	5–2	0–1

=== Semi-finals ===
Team 1	Agg.	Team 2	1st leg	2nd leg
Valencia (Spain)	5–3	(Spain) Barcelona	4–1	1–2
Real Madrid (Spain)	3–2	(Germany) Bayern Munich	2–0	1–2

=== Final ===
The final was played on 24 May 2000 at the Stade de France in Saint-Denis, France.

24 May 2000
20:45 UTC+2

Real Madrid (Spain)	3–0	(Spain) Valencia
Morientes 39'; McManaman 67'; Raúl 75'	Report

Stade de France, Saint-Denis
Attendance: 80,000
Referee: Stefano Braschi (Italy)

== Top goalscorers ==
The top scorers from the 1999–2000 UEFA Champions League (excluding qualifying rounds) are as follows:

Rank	Name	Team	Goals	Minutes played
1	(Brazil) Mário Jardel	(Portugal) Porto	10	1150
1	(Brazil) Rivaldo	(Spain) Barcelona	10	1229
1	(Spain) Raúl	(Spain) Real Madrid	10	1350
4	(Italy) Simone Inzaghi	(Italy) Lazio	9	700
5	(Ukraine) Serhiy Rebrov	(Ukraine) Dynamo Kyiv	8	1061
5	(Norway) Tore André Flo	(England) Chelsea	8	1159
7	(Brazil) Paulo Sérgio	(Germany) Bayern Munich	7	1007
7	(Netherlands) Patrick Kluivert	(Spain) Barcelona	7	1203
9	(Spain) Luis Enrique	(Spain) Barcelona	6	581
9	(Argentina) Gabriel Batistuta	(Italy) Fiorentina	6	875
9	(Republic of Ireland) Roy Keane	(England) Manchester United	6	1048
9	(Spain) Fernando Morientes	(Spain) Real Madrid	6	1129

== See also ==
- 1999–2000 UEFA Cup
- 2000 UEFA Super Cup
- 1999 UEFA Intertoto Cup
