= 1999–2000 UEFA Champions League first group stage =

The 1999–2000 UEFA Champions League first group stage matches took place between 14 September and 3 November 1999. The draw for the group stage was made in August 1999.

The group stage featured the 16 automatic qualifiers and the 16 winners of the third qualifying round. Each team was drawn into one of eight groups but avoided teams from their own country. All four teams in the group played home and away matches against each other to determine the winner and runner-up in the group.

At the completion of the group stage, the top two teams in each group advanced to play in a second group stage, while the third-placed teams dropped down to the UEFA Cup.

== Teams ==
Seeding was determined by the UEFA coefficients. Clubs from the same association were paired up to split the matchdays between Tuesday and Wednesday. Clubs with the same pairing letter would play on different days, ensuring that teams from the same city (e.g. Milan and Internazionale, who also share a stadium) did not play on the same day.

Key to colours in group tables
Group winners and runners-up advance to the second group stage
Third-placed teams enter the UEFA Cup at the third round

Pot 1
Team	Notes	Coeff.
(England) Manchester United		72.144
(Germany) Bayern Munich		90.749
(Italy) Lazio		86.606
(Germany) Borussia Dortmund		84.749
(Spain) Barcelona		79.814
(Spain) Real Madrid		74.814
(Italy) Milan		66.606
(Russia) Spartak Moscow		62.912

Pot 2
Team	Notes	Coeff.
(England) Chelsea		58.144
(Netherlands) Feyenoord		56.908
(France) Bordeaux		56.721
(Germany) Bayer Leverkusen		54.749
(Portugal) Porto		52.358
(Netherlands) PSV Eindhoven		49.908
(Italy) Fiorentina		44.606
(France) Marseille		43.721

Pot 3
Team	Notes	Coeff.
(Norway) Rosenborg		41.866
(Spain) Valencia		40.814
(Ukraine) Dynamo Kyiv		40.145
(England) Arsenal		40.144
(Greece) Olympiacos		36.475
(Turkey) Galatasaray		31.175
(Czech Republic) Sparta Prague		26.812
Croatia Zagreb		25.187

Pot 4
Team	Notes	Coeff.
(Netherlands) Willem II		23.908
(Germany) Hertha BSC		22.749
(Scotland) Rangers		22.312
(Portugal) Boavista		21.358
(Austria) Sturm Graz		21.187
(Sweden) AIK		18.662
(Norway) Molde		9.866
(Slovenia) Maribor		7.415

Notes

1. ^{TH} Champions League title holders (automatic top seed of pot 1)
2. ^{Q3} Winners of the third qualifying round

== Tie-breaking criteria ==
Based on Article 7.06 in the UEFA regulations, if two or more teams are equal on points on completion of the group matches, the following criteria will be applied to determine the rankings:

1. higher number of points obtained in the group matches played among the teams in question;
2. superior goal difference from the group matches played among the teams in question;
3. higher number of goals scored away from home in the group matches played among the teams in question;
4. superior goal difference from all group matches played;
5. higher number of goals scored;
6. higher number of coefficient points accumulated by the club in question, as well as its association, over the previous five seasons.

== Groups ==
=== Group A ===
Pos	Team	Pld	W	D	L	GF	GA	GD	Pts	Qualification	LAZ	DKV	LEV	MRB
1	(Italy) Lazio	6	4	2	0	13	3	+10	14	Advance to second group stage	—	2–1	1–1	4–0
2	(Ukraine) Dynamo Kyiv	6	2	1	3	8	8	0	7	Advance to second group stage	0–1	—	4–2	0–1
3	(Germany) Bayer Leverkusen	6	1	4	1	7	7	0	7	Transfer to UEFA Cup	1–1	1–1	—	0–0
4	(Slovenia) Maribor	6	1	1	4	2	12	−10	4		0–4	1–2	0–2	—

Source: UEFA
14 September 1999
20:45

Bayer Leverkusen (Germany)	1–1	(Italy) Lazio
Neuville 14'	Report	Mihajlović 18'

BayArena, Leverkusen
Attendance: 20,002
Referee: Graham Poll (England)
14 September 1999
20:45

Dynamo Kyiv (Ukraine)	0–1	(Slovenia) Maribor
	Report	Šimundža 72'

Olimpiyskiy NSC, Kyiv
Attendance: 35,000
Referee: Leslie Irvine (Northern Ireland)

22 September 1999
20:45

Maribor (Slovenia)	0–2	(Germany) Bayer Leverkusen
	Report	Živković 83'; Kirsten 90+3'

Ljudski vrt, Maribor
Attendance: 9,012
Referee: Jan Wegereef (Netherlands)
22 September 1999
20:45

Lazio (Italy)	2–1	(Ukraine) Dynamo Kyiv
Negro 72'; Salas 75'	Report	Rebrov 68' (pen.)

Stadio Olimpico, Rome
Attendance: 37,348
Referee: Manuel Díaz Vega (Spain)

29 September 1999
20:45

Lazio (Italy)	4–0	(Slovenia) Maribor
Inzaghi 59'; Conceição 61'; Salas 70', 76'	Report

Stadio Olimpico, Rome
Attendance: 29,571
Referee: Lucílio Batista (Portugal)
29 September 1999
20:45

Bayer Leverkusen (Germany)	1–1	(Ukraine) Dynamo Kyiv
Kirsten 52'	Report	Husin 71'

BayArena, Leverkusen
Attendance: 22,500
Referee: Claude Colombo (France)

19 October 1999
20:45

Maribor (Slovenia)	0–4	(Italy) Lazio
	Report	Mihajlović 36'; Inzaghi 50', 74'; Stanković 63'

Ljudski vrt, Maribor
Attendance: 9,156
Referee: Terje Hauge (Norway)
19 October 1999
20:45

Dynamo Kyiv (Ukraine)	4–2	(Germany) Bayer Leverkusen
Kosovsky 4'; Shatskikh 36'; Holovko 61'; Vashchuk 89'	Report	Kirsten 12'; Neuville 49'

Olimpiyskiy NSC, Kyiv
Attendance: 47,000
Referee: Karl-Erik Nilsson (Sweden)

27 October 1999
20:45

Lazio (Italy)	1–1	(Germany) Bayer Leverkusen
Nedvěd 1'	Report	Kirsten 44'

Stadio Olimpico, Rome
Attendance: 30,627
Referee: Hugh Dallas (Scotland)
27 October 1999
20:45

Maribor (Slovenia)	1–2	(Ukraine) Dynamo Kyiv
Balajić 50'	Report	Rebrov 36', 84' (pen.)

Ljudski vrt, Maribor
Attendance: 8,650
Referee: Juan Fernández Marin (Spain)

2 November 1999
20:45

Bayer Leverkusen (Germany)	0–0	(Slovenia) Maribor
	Report

BayArena, Leverkusen
Attendance: 22,500
Referee: David Elleray (England)
2 November 1999
20:45

Dynamo Kyiv (Ukraine)	0–1	(Italy) Lazio
	Report	Mamedov 18' (o.g.)

Olimpiyskiy NSC, Kyiv
Attendance: 67,800
Referee: Paul Durkin (England)

=== Group B ===
Pos	Team	Pld	W	D	L	GF	GA	GD	Pts	Qualification	BAR	FIO	ARS	AIK
1	(Spain) Barcelona	6	4	2	0	19	9	+10	14	Advance to second group stage	—	4–2	1–1	5–0
2	(Italy) Fiorentina	6	2	3	1	9	7	+2	9	Advance to second group stage	3–3	—	0–0	3–0
3	(England) Arsenal	6	2	2	2	9	9	0	8	Transfer to UEFA Cup	2–4	0–1	—	3–1
4	(Sweden) AIK	6	0	1	5	4	16	−12	1		1–2	0–0	2–3	—

Source: UEFA
14 September 1999
20:45

Fiorentina (Italy)	0–0	(England) Arsenal
	Report

Stadio Artemio Franchi, Florence
Attendance: 37,903
Referee: Hellmut Krug (Germany)
14 September 1999
20:45

AIK (Sweden)	1–2	(Spain) Barcelona
Novaković 71'	Report	Abelardo 86'; Dani 90+3'

Råsunda Stadium, Solna
Attendance: 30,543
Referee: Alain Sars (France)

22 September 1999
20:45

Arsenal (England)	3–1	(Sweden) AIK
Ljungberg 27'; Henry 90+1'; Šuker 90+3'	Report	Nordin 53'

Wembley Stadium, London
Attendance: 71,227
Referee: Vítor Melo Pereira (Portugal)
22 September 1999
20:45

Barcelona (Spain)	4–2	(Italy) Fiorentina
Figo 7'; Luis Enrique 10'; Rivaldo 68' (pen.), 70'	Report	Batistuta 50'; Chiesa 79'

Camp Nou, Barcelona
Attendance: 69,486
Referee: Kim Milton Nielsen (Denmark)

29 September 1999
20:45

Barcelona (Spain)	1–1	(England) Arsenal
Luis Enrique 16'	Report	Kanu 81'

Camp Nou, Barcelona
Attendance: 87,574
Referee: Markus Merk (Germany)
29 September 1999
20:45

AIK (Sweden)	0–0	(Italy) Fiorentina
	Report

Råsunda Stadium, Solna
Attendance: 30,195
Referee: Günter Benkö (Austria)

19 October 1999
20:45

Fiorentina (Italy)	3–0	(Sweden) AIK
Batistuta 5'; Chiesa 32'; Balbo 86'	Report

Stadio Artemio Franchi, Florence
Attendance: 15,280
Referee: Jan Wegereef (Netherlands)
19 October 1999
20:45

Arsenal (England)	2–4	(Spain) Barcelona
Bergkamp 43'; Overmars 84'	Report	Rivaldo 14' (pen.); Luis Enrique 15'; Figo 55'; Cocu 69'

Wembley Stadium, London
Attendance: 73,091
Referee: Urs Meier (Switzerland)

27 October 1999
20:45

Arsenal (England)	0–1	(Italy) Fiorentina
	Report	Batistuta 75'

Wembley Stadium, London
Attendance: 73,256
Referee: Ľuboš Micheľ (Slovakia)
27 October 1999
20:45

Barcelona (Spain)	5–0	(Sweden) AIK
Kluivert 15', 33'; Zenden 43'; Gabri 53'; Déhu 56'	Report

Camp Nou, Barcelona
Attendance: 40,050
Referee: Leslie Irvine (Northern Ireland)

2 November 1999
20:45

Fiorentina (Italy)	3–3	(Spain) Barcelona
Bressan 14'; Balbo 56', 69'	Report	Figo 20'; Rivaldo 43', 74'

Stadio Artemio Franchi, Florence
Attendance: 23,588
Referee: Hugh Dallas (Scotland)
2 November 1999
20:45

AIK (Sweden)	2–3	(England) Arsenal
A. Andersson 41', 68'	Report	Overmars 17', 52'; Šuker 56'

Råsunda Stadium, Solna
Attendance: 33,005
Referee: Hartmut Strampe (Germany)

=== Group C ===
Pos	Team	Pld	W	D	L	GF	GA	GD	Pts	Qualification	ROS	FEY	DOR	BOA
1	(Norway) Rosenborg	6	3	2	1	12	5	+7	11	Advance to second group stage	—	2–2	2–2	2–0
2	(Netherlands) Feyenoord	6	1	5	0	7	6	+1	8	Advance to second group stage	1–0	—	1–1	1–1
3	(Germany) Borussia Dortmund	6	1	3	2	7	9	−2	6	Transfer to UEFA Cup	0–3	1–1	—	3–1
4	(Portugal) Boavista	6	1	2	3	4	10	−6	5		0–3	1–1	1–0	—

Source: UEFA
14 September 1999
20:45

Boavista (Portugal)	0–3	(Norway) Rosenborg
	Report	Sørensen 9'; Berg 43'; Strand 73'

Estádio do Bessa, Porto
Attendance: 6,000
Referee: Graziano Cesari (Italy)
14 September 1999
20:45

Feyenoord (Netherlands)	1–1	(Germany) Borussia Dortmund
Van Wonderen 66'	Report	Bobić 70'

De Kuip, Rotterdam
Attendance: 34,500
Referee: José María García-Aranda (Spain)

22 September 1999
20:45

Borussia Dortmund (Germany)	3–1	(Portugal) Boavista
Möller 40'; Bobić 53', 65'	Report	Bento 44'

Westfalenstadion, Dortmund
Attendance: 38,000
Referee: Atanas Uzunov (Bulgaria)
22 September 1999
20:45

Rosenborg (Norway)	2–2	(Netherlands) Feyenoord
Carew 19', 24'	Report	Tomasson 11'; Bosvelt 22'

Lerkendal Stadion, Trondheim
Attendance: 14,129
Referee: Miroslav Radoman (FR Yugoslavia)

29 September 1999
19:45

Boavista (Portugal)	1–1	(Netherlands) Feyenoord
Silva 87'	Report	Bosvelt 62'

Estádio do Bessa, Porto
Attendance: 5,397
Referee: Graham Poll (England)
29 September 1999
20:45

Rosenborg (Norway)	2–2	(Germany) Borussia Dortmund
Sørensen 35'; Carew 68'	Report	Barbarez 11'; Kohler 22'

Lerkendal Stadion, Trondheim
Attendance: 14,068
Referee: Paul Durkin (England)

19 October 1999
20:45

Borussia Dortmund (Germany)	0–3	(Norway) Rosenborg
	Report	Sørensen 17', 58'; Winsnes 70'

Westfalenstadion, Dortmund
Attendance: 40,000
Referee: Antonio López Nieto (Spain)
19 October 1999
20:45

Feyenoord (Netherlands)	1–1	(Portugal) Boavista
Tomasson 76'	Report	Timofte 82' (pen.)

De Kuip, Rotterdam
Attendance: 35,800
Referee: Alfredo Trentalange (Italy)

27 October 1999
20:45

Rosenborg (Norway)	2–0	(Portugal) Boavista
Berg 61'; Dahlum 66'	Report

Lerkendal Stadion, Trondheim
Attendance: 14,167
Referee: Michel Piraux (Belgium)
27 October 1999
20:45

Borussia Dortmund (Germany)	1–1	(Netherlands) Feyenoord
Addo 44'	Report	Van Vossen 72'

Westfalenstadion, Dortmund
Attendance: 39,000
Referee: Claude Colombo (France)

2 November 1999
19:45

Boavista (Portugal)	1–0	(Germany) Borussia Dortmund
Emanuel 16'	Report

Estádio do Bessa, Porto
Attendance: 4,289
Referee: Ľuboš Micheľ (Slovakia)
2 November 1999
20:45

Feyenoord (Netherlands)	1–0	(Norway) Rosenborg
Somália 86'	Report

De Kuip, Rotterdam
Attendance: 36,332
Referee: Manuel Díaz Vega (Spain)

=== Group D ===
Pos	Team	Pld	W	D	L	GF	GA	GD	Pts	Qualification	MUN	MAR	STM	CZG
1	(England) Manchester United	6	4	1	1	9	4	+5	13	Advance to second group stage	—	2–1	2–1	0–0
2	(France) Marseille	6	3	1	2	10	8	+2	10	Advance to second group stage	1–0	—	2–0	2–2
3	(Austria) Sturm Graz	6	2	0	4	5	12	−7	6	Transfer to UEFA Cup	0–3	3–2	—	1–0
4	Croatia Zagreb	6	1	2	3	7	7	0	5		1–2	1–2	3–0	—

Source: UEFA
14 September 1999
20:45

Manchester United (England)	0–0	Croatia Zagreb
	Report

Old Trafford, Manchester
Attendance: 53,250
Referee: Nikolai Levnikov (Russia)
14 September 1999
20:45

Marseille (France)	2–0	(Austria) Sturm Graz
Pires 9'; Ravanelli 33'	Report

Stade Vélodrome, Marseille
Attendance: 19,000
Referee: Oğuz Sarvan (Turkey)

22 September 1999
20:45

Sturm Graz (Austria)	0–3	(England) Manchester United
	Report	Keane 15'; Yorke 30'; Cole 33'

Arnold Schwarzenegger-Stadium, Graz
Attendance: 16,480
Referee: Alfredo Trentalange (Italy)
22 September 1999
20:45

Croatia Zagreb	1–2	(France) Marseille
Šokota 64'	Report	Bakayoko 5'; Pérez 77'

Stadion Maksimir, Zagreb
Attendance: 21,500
Referee: Stefano Braschi (Italy)

29 September 1999
20:45

Manchester United (England)	2–1	(France) Marseille
Cole 78'; Scholes 82'	Report	Bakayoko 40'

Old Trafford, Manchester
Attendance: 53,993
Referee: José María García-Aranda (Spain)
29 September 1999
20:45

Croatia Zagreb	3–0	(Austria) Sturm Graz
Rukavina 28'; Šokota 34', 58' (pen.)	Report

Stadion Maksimir, Zagreb
Attendance: 21,158
Referee: Antonio López Nieto (Spain)

19 October 1999
20:45

Sturm Graz (Austria)	1–0	Croatia Zagreb
Kocijan 40'	Report

Arnold Schwarzenegger-Stadium, Graz
Attendance: 12,000
Referee: Alain Hamer (Luxembourg)
19 October 1999
20:45

Marseille (France)	1–0	(England) Manchester United
Gallas 69'	Report

Stade Vélodrome, Marseille
Attendance: 56,732
Referee: Hellmut Krug (Germany)

27 October 1999
20:45

Croatia Zagreb	1–2	(England) Manchester United
Prosinečki 87'	Report	Beckham 32'; Keane 49'

Stadion Maksimir, Zagreb
Attendance: 27,500
Referee: Dick Jol (Netherlands)
27 October 1999
20:45

Sturm Graz (Austria)	3–2	(France) Marseille
Mählich 17'; Kocijan 61', 85'	Report	Dugarry 53', 78'

Arnold Schwarzenegger-Stadium, Graz
Attendance: 14,850
Referee: Atanas Uzunov (Bulgaria)

2 November 1999
20:45

Manchester United (England)	2–1	(Austria) Sturm Graz
Solskjær 56'; Keane 70'	Report	Vastić 88' (pen.)

Old Trafford, Manchester
Attendance: 53,745
Referee: Rune Pedersen (Norway)
2 November 1999
20:45

Marseille (France)	2–2	Croatia Zagreb
Bakayoko 53'; Diawara 89'	Report	Mujčin 42'; Mikić 78'

Stade Vélodrome, Marseille
Attendance: 33,651
Referee: Pierluigi Collina (Italy)

=== Group E ===
Pos	Team	Pld	W	D	L	GF	GA	GD	Pts	Qualification	RMA	POR	OLY	MOL
1	(Spain) Real Madrid	6	4	1	1	15	7	+8	13	Advance to second group stage	—	3–1	3–0	4–1
2	(Portugal) Porto	6	4	0	2	9	6	+3	12	Advance to second group stage	2–1	—	2–0	3–1
3	(Greece) Olympiacos	6	2	1	3	9	12	−3	7	Transfer to UEFA Cup	3–3	1–0	—	3–1
4	(Norway) Molde	6	1	0	5	6	14	−8	3		0–1	0–1	3–2	—

Source: UEFA
15 September 1999
20:45

Molde (Norway)	0–1	(Portugal) Porto
	Report	Deco 89'

Molde Stadium, Molde
Attendance: 8,739
Referee: Alain Hamer (Luxembourg)
15 September 1999
21:45

Olympiacos (Greece)	3–3	(Spain) Real Madrid
Giovanni 11', 64'; Zahovič 67'	Report	Sávio 24'; Roberto Carlos 32'; Raúl 80'

Olympic Stadium, Athens
Attendance: 70,800
Referee: Mario van der Ende (Netherlands)

21 September 1999
19:45

Porto (Portugal)	2–0	(Greece) Olympiacos
Esquerdinha 6'; Jardel 47'	Report

Estádio das Antas, Porto
Attendance: 21,500
Referee: David Elleray (England)
21 September 1999
20:45

Real Madrid (Spain)	4–1	(Norway) Molde
Morientes 27'; Sávio 60', 70' (pen.); Guti 81'	Report	Lindbæk 80'

Santiago Bernabéu, Madrid
Attendance: 29,500
Referee: Hartmut Strampe (Germany)

28 September 1999
20:45

Real Madrid (Spain)	3–1	(Portugal) Porto
Morientes 23'; Helguera 37'; Hierro 68' (pen.)	Report	Jardel 24'

Santiago Bernabéu, Madrid
Attendance: 41,000
Referee: Pierluigi Collina (Italy)
28 September 1999
21:45

Olympiacos (Greece)	3–1	(Norway) Molde
Giovanni 16', 70'; Luciano 77'	Report	Lund 58'

Olympic Stadium, Athens
Attendance: 40,299
Referee: Ľuboš Micheľ (Slovakia)

20 October 1999
19:45

Porto (Portugal)	2–1	(Spain) Real Madrid
Jardel 13', 35'	Report	Peixe 68' (o.g.)

Estádio das Antas, Porto
Attendance: 36,550
Referee: Bernd Heynemann (Germany)
20 October 1999
20:45

Molde (Norway)	3–2	(Greece) Olympiacos
Lund 54', 59'; Hestad 72'	Report	Mavrogenidis 36'; Zahovič 40'

Molde Stadium, Molde
Attendance: 10,230
Referee: Ryszard Wójcik (Poland)

26 October 1999
19:45

Porto (Portugal)	3–1	(Norway) Molde
Deco 1', 28'; Jardel 58'	Report	Hestad 82'

Estádio das Antas, Porto
Attendance: 26,100
Referee: Graham Barber (England)
26 October 1999
20:45

Real Madrid (Spain)	3–0	(Greece) Olympiacos
Raúl 21'; Morientes 64'; Roberto Carlos 83'	Report

Santiago Bernabéu, Madrid
Attendance: 23,000
Referee: Markus Merk (Germany)

3 November 1999
20:45

Molde (Norway)	0–1	(Spain) Real Madrid
	Report	Karembeu 42'

Molde Stadium, Molde
Attendance: 10,705
Referee: Gilles Veissière (France)
3 November 1999
21:45

Olympiacos (Greece)	1–0	(Portugal) Porto
Giannakopoulos 56'	Report

Olympic Stadium, Athens
Attendance: 24,131
Referee: Kim Milton Nielsen (Denmark)

=== Group F ===
Pos	Team	Pld	W	D	L	GF	GA	GD	Pts	Qualification	VAL	BAY	RAN	PSV
1	(Spain) Valencia	6	3	3	0	8	4	+4	12	Advance to second group stage	—	1–1	2–0	1–0
2	(Germany) Bayern Munich	6	2	3	1	7	6	+1	9	Advance to second group stage	1–1	—	1–0	2–1
3	(Scotland) Rangers	6	2	1	3	7	7	0	7	Transfer to UEFA Cup	1–2	1–1	—	4–1
4	(Netherlands) PSV Eindhoven	6	1	1	4	5	10	−5	4		1–1	2–1	0–1	—

Source: UEFA
15 September 1999
20:45

Bayern Munich (Germany)	2–1	(Netherlands) PSV Eindhoven
Paulo Sérgio 11', 69'	Report	Khokhlov 59'

Olympic Stadium, Munich
Attendance: 32,000
Referee: Gilles Veissière (France)
15 September 1999
20:45

Valencia (Spain)	2–0	(Scotland) Rangers
Kily González 57', 74'	Report

Mestalla, Valencia
Attendance: 31,524
Referee: Ľuboš Micheľ (Slovakia)

21 September 1999
19:45

Rangers (Scotland)	1–1	(Germany) Bayern Munich
Albertz 22'	Report	Tarnat 90'

Ibrox Stadium, Glasgow
Attendance: 49,960
Referee: Ryszard Wójcik (Poland)
21 September 1999
20:45

PSV Eindhoven (Netherlands)	1–1	(Spain) Valencia
Van Nistelrooy 72' (pen.)	Report	Claudio López 4'

Philips Stadion, Eindhoven
Attendance: 26,500
Referee: Rune Pedersen (Norway)

28 September 1999
20:45

Bayern Munich (Germany)	1–1	(Spain) Valencia
Élber 5'	Report	Gerard 80'

Olympic Stadium, Munich
Attendance: 31,000
Referee: Graziano Cesari (Italy)
28 September 1999
20:45

PSV Eindhoven (Netherlands)	0–1	(Scotland) Rangers
	Report	Albertz 80'

Philips Stadion, Eindhoven
Attendance: 28,000
Referee: Anders Frisk (Sweden)

20 October 1999
20:45

Rangers (Scotland)	4–1	(Netherlands) PSV Eindhoven
Amoruso 19'; Mols 39', 80'; N. McCann 56'	Report	Van Nistelrooy 45' (pen.)

Ibrox Stadium, Glasgow
Attendance: 50,083
Referee: Pierluigi Collina (Italy)
20 October 1999
20:45

Valencia (Spain)	1–1	(Germany) Bayern Munich
Ilie 11'	Report	Effenberg 18' (pen.)

Mestalla, Valencia
Attendance: 40,251
Referee: Anders Frisk (Sweden)

26 October 1999
20:45

PSV Eindhoven (Netherlands)	2–1	(Germany) Bayern Munich
Van Nistelrooy 40'; Nilis 57'	Report	Santa Cruz 51'

Philips Stadion, Eindhoven
Attendance: 29,003
Referee: Paul Durkin (England)
26 October 1999
20:45

Rangers (Scotland)	1–2	(Spain) Valencia
Moore 59'	Report	Mendieta 35'; Claudio López 45'

Ibrox Stadium, Glasgow
Attendance: 50,063
Referee: Günter Benkö (Austria)

3 November 1999
20:45

Bayern Munich (Germany)	1–0	(Scotland) Rangers
Strunz 32' (pen.)	Report

Olympic Stadium, Munich
Attendance: 54,000
Referee: Vítor Melo Pereira (Portugal)
3 November 1999
20:45

Valencia (Spain)	1–0	(Netherlands) PSV Eindhoven
Claudio López 70'	Report

Mestalla, Valencia
Attendance: 26,266
Referee: Graham Barber (England)

=== Group G ===
Pos	Team	Pld	W	D	L	GF	GA	GD	Pts	Qualification	SPP	BOR	SPM	WIL
1	(Czech Republic) Sparta Prague	6	3	3	0	14	6	+8	12	Advance to second group stage	—	0–0	5–2	4–0
2	(France) Bordeaux	6	3	3	0	7	4	+3	12	Advance to second group stage	0–0	—	2–1	3–2
3	(Russia) Spartak Moscow	6	1	2	3	9	12	−3	5	Transfer to UEFA Cup	1–1	1–2	—	1–1
4	(Netherlands) Willem II	6	0	2	4	7	15	−8	2		3–4	0–0	1–3	—

Source: UEFA
15 September 1999
20:45

Willem II (Netherlands)	1–3	(Russia) Spartak Moscow
Arts 56'	Report	Tikhonov 26' (pen.), 36', 52' (pen.)

Koning Willem II Stadion, Tilburg
Attendance: 14,700
Referee: Juan Fernández Marin (Spain)
15 September 1999
20:45

Sparta Prague (Czech Republic)	0–0	(France) Bordeaux
	Report

Letná Stadium, Prague
Attendance: 14,928
Referee: Terje Hauge (Norway)

21 September 1999
20:00

Spartak Moscow (Russia)	1–1	(Czech Republic) Sparta Prague
Bezrodny 73'	Report	Lokvenc 17'

Luzhniki Stadium, Moscow
Attendance: 43,000
Referee: Karl-Erik Nilsson (Sweden)
21 September 1999
20:45

Bordeaux (France)	3–2	(Netherlands) Willem II
Victoria 17' (o.g.); Laslandes 22'; Feindouno 82'	Report	Abdellaoui 40'; Sanou 70'

Stade Chaban-Delmas, Bordeaux
Attendance: 13,231
Referee: Graham Barber (England)

28 September 1999
20:45

Bordeaux (France)	2–1	(Russia) Spartak Moscow
Wiltord 9'; Micoud 56'	Report	Bezrodny 64'

Stade Chaban-Delmas, Bordeaux
Attendance: 18,676
Referee: Urs Meier (Switzerland)
28 September 1999
20:45

Sparta Prague (Czech Republic)	4–0	(Netherlands) Willem II
Novotný 26'; Prohászka 29' (pen.); Rosický 40'; Jarošík 58'	Report

Letná Stadium, Prague
Attendance: 10,581
Referee: Bernd Heynemann (Germany)

20 October 1999
20:45

Willem II (Netherlands)	3–4	(Czech Republic) Sparta Prague
Bombarda 1'; Shoukov 5'; Schenning 50'	Report	Novotný 17'; Labant 59' (pen.), 89' (pen.); Baranek 62'

Koning Willem II Stadion, Tilburg
Attendance: 13,419
Referee: Oğuz Sarvan (Turkey)
20 October 1999
20:00

Spartak Moscow (Russia)	1–2	(France) Bordeaux
Tikhonov 55' (pen.)	Report	Micoud 21'; Wiltord 76'

Luzhniki Stadium, Moscow
Attendance: 46,300
Referee: Graham Poll (England)

26 October 1999
20:00

Spartak Moscow (Russia)	1–1	(Netherlands) Willem II
Bezrodny 25'	Report	Sanou 69'

Luzhniki Stadium, Moscow
Attendance: 17,600
Referee: Lucílio Batista (Portugal)
26 October 1999
20:45

Bordeaux (France)	0–0	(Czech Republic) Sparta Prague
	Report

Stade Chaban-Delmas, Bordeaux
Attendance: 22,138
Referee: Manuel Díaz Vega (Spain)

3 November 1999
20:45

Sparta Prague (Czech Republic)	5–2	(Russia) Spartak Moscow
Lokvenc 1', 66'; Rosický 11'; Fukal 49'; Labant 63' (pen.)	Report	Bulatov 34'; Bezrodny 43'

Letná Stadium, Prague
Attendance: 12,107
Referee: Michel Piraux (Belgium)
3 November 1999
20:45

Willem II (Netherlands)	0–0	(France) Bordeaux
	Report

Koning Willem II Stadion, Tilburg
Attendance: 13,100
Referee: Miroslav Radoman (FR Yugoslavia)

=== Group H ===
Pos	Team	Pld	W	D	L	GF	GA	GD	Pts	Qualification	CHE	HER	GAL	MIL
1	(England) Chelsea	6	3	2	1	10	3	+7	11	Advance to second group stage	—	2–0	1–0	0–0
2	(Germany) Hertha BSC	6	2	2	2	7	10	−3	8	Advance to second group stage	2–1	—	1–4	1–0
3	(Turkey) Galatasaray	6	2	1	3	10	13	−3	7	Transfer to UEFA Cup	0–5	2–2	—	3–2
4	(Italy) Milan	6	1	3	2	6	7	−1	6		1–1	1–1	2–1	—

Source: UEFA
15 September 1999
21:45

Galatasaray (Turkey)	2–2	(Germany) Hertha BSC
Şükür 24'; Hagi 86' (pen.)	Report	Preetz 12'; Wosz 13'

Ali Sami Yen Stadium, Istanbul
Attendance: 18,100
Referee: Urs Meier (Switzerland)
15 September 1999
20:45

Chelsea (England)	0–0	(Italy) Milan
	Report

Stamford Bridge, London
Attendance: 33,834
Referee: Anders Frisk (Sweden)

21 September 1999
20:45

Milan (Italy)	2–1	(Turkey) Galatasaray
Leonardo 44'; Shevchenko 45'	Report	Ümit 50'

San Siro, Milan
Attendance: 37,822
Referee: Hugh Dallas (Scotland)
21 September 1999
20:45

Hertha BSC (Germany)	2–1	(England) Chelsea
Daei 2', 69'	Report	Leboeuf 86' (pen.)

Olympic Stadium, Berlin
Attendance: 51,541
Referee: Michel Piraux (Belgium)

28 September 1999
20:45

Milan (Italy)	1–1	(Germany) Hertha BSC
Bierhoff 74'	Report	Daei 69'

San Siro, Milan
Attendance: 40,941
Referee: Gilles Veissière (France)
28 September 1999
19:45

Chelsea (England)	1–0	(Turkey) Galatasaray
Petrescu 55'	Report

Stamford Bridge, London
Attendance: 33,426
Referee: Dick Jol (Netherlands)

20 October 1999
21:45

Galatasaray (Turkey)	0–5	(England) Chelsea
	Report	Flo 32', 49'; Zola 54'; Wise 79'; Ambrosetti 88'

Ali Sami Yen Stadium, Istanbul
Attendance: 20,600
Referee: Vítor Melo Pereira (Portugal)
20 October 1999
20:45

Hertha BSC (Germany)	1–0	(Italy) Milan
Wosz 41'	Report

Olympic Stadium, Berlin
Attendance: 74,800
Referee: José María García-Aranda (Spain)

26 October 1999
20:45

Milan (Italy)	1–1	(England) Chelsea
Bierhoff 74'	Report	Wise 77'

San Siro, Milan
Attendance: 74,855
Referee: Nikolai Levnikov (Russia)
26 October 1999
20:45

Hertha BSC (Germany)	1–4	(Turkey) Galatasaray
Rekdal 35' (pen.)	Report	Şükür 48', 66'; Tugay 81'; Okan 90'

Olympic Stadium, Berlin
Attendance: 71,520
Referee: Kim Milton Nielsen (Denmark)

3 November 1999
19:45

Chelsea (England)	2–0	(Germany) Hertha BSC
Deschamps 11'; Ferrer 44'	Report

Stamford Bridge, London
Attendance: 33,623
Referee: Karl-Erik Nilsson (Sweden)
3 November 1999
21:45

Galatasaray (Turkey)	3–2	(Italy) Milan
Capone 27'; Şükür 87'; Ümit 90' (pen.)	Report	Weah 20'; Giunti 51'

Ali Sami Yen Stadium, Istanbul
Attendance: 17,361
Referee: Antonio López Nieto (Spain)
