= 1999–2000 UEFA Champions League second group stage =

International football competition

The 1999–2000 UEFA Champions League second group stage matches took place between 23 November 1999 and 22 March 2000. The second group stage featured the eight group winners and eight group runners-up from the first group stage. Each team was drawn into one of four groups, each of which featured three other clubs. All four teams in the group played home and away matches against each other to determine the winner and runner-up in the group.

At the completion of the second group stage, the top two teams in each group advanced to the quarter-finals, while the other two teams were eliminated from European competition.

== Teams ==
The winners of the first group stage groups are put into seeded pots 1 and 2 according to their UEFA coefficients. The four group-winners with the best coefficients will go into seed pot 1. The eight group runners-up will be put into seed pots 3 and 4 according to the same principle, i.e. the four clubs with the best coefficients will go into seed pot 3. One club from each seed pot will be drawn into each of the four groups. Clubs from the same association cannot be drawn into the same group and group-winners and runners-up from the same first-stage group will not be drawn into the same group again.

Key to colours in group tables
Group winners and runners-up advance to the knockout stage

Pot 1 (higher-coefficient group winners)
| Team | Coeff. |
|---|---|
| (England) Manchester United | 72.144 |
| (Italy) Lazio | 86.606 |
| (Spain) Barcelona | 79.814 |
| (Spain) Real Madrid | 74.814 |

Pot 2 (lower-coefficient group winners)
| Team | Coeff. |
|---|---|
| (England) Chelsea | 58.144 |
| (Norway) Rosenborg | 41.866 |
| (Spain) Valencia | 40.814 |
| (Czech Republic) Sparta Prague | 26.812 |

Pot 3 (higher-coefficient group runners-up)
| Team | Coeff. |
|---|---|
| (Germany) Bayern Munich | 90.749 |
| (Netherlands) Feyenoord | 56.908 |
| (France) Bordeaux | 56.721 |
| (Portugal) Porto | 52.358 |

Pot 4 (lower-coefficient group runners-up)
| Team | Coeff. |
|---|---|
| (Italy) Fiorentina | 44.606 |
| (France) Marseille | 43.721 |
| (Ukraine) Dynamo Kyiv | 40.145 |
| (Germany) Hertha BSC | 22.749 |

Notes

1. ^{TH} Champions League title holders

== Tie-breaking criteria ==
Based on Article 7.06 in the UEFA regulations, if two or more teams are equal on points on completion of the group matches, the following criteria will be applied to determine the rankings:

1. higher number of points obtained in the group matches played among the teams in question;
2. superior goal difference from the group matches played among the teams in question;
3. higher number of goals scored away from home in the group matches played among the teams in question;
4. superior goal difference from all group matches played;
5. higher number of goals scored;
6. higher number of coefficient points accumulated by the club in question, as well as its association, over the previous five seasons.

== Groups ==
=== Group A ===
| Pos | Team | Pld | W | D | L | GF | GA | GD | Pts | Qualification | BAR | POR | SPP | HER |
|---|---|---|---|---|---|---|---|---|---|---|---|---|---|---|
| 1 | (Spain) Barcelona | 6 | 5 | 1 | 0 | 17 | 5 | +12 | 16 | Advance to knockout stage | — | 4–2 | 5–0 | 3–1 |
| 2 | (Portugal) Porto | 6 | 3 | 1 | 2 | 8 | 8 | 0 | 10 | Advance to knockout stage | 0–2 | — | 2–2 | 1–0 |
| 3 | (Czech Republic) Sparta Prague | 6 | 1 | 2 | 3 | 5 | 12 | −7 | 5 | | 1–2 | 0–2 | — | 1–0 |
| 4 | (Germany) Hertha BSC | 6 | 0 | 2 | 4 | 3 | 8 | −5 | 2 | | 1–1 | 0–1 | 1–1 | — |

Source: UEFA
23 November 1999
20:45

| Hertha BSC (Germany) | 1–1 | (Spain) Barcelona |
|---|---|---|
| Michalke 33' | Report | Luis Enrique 13' |

Olympiastadion, Berlin
Attendance: 60,562
Referee: Nikolay Levnikov (Russia)
23 November 1999
20:45

| Sparta Prague (Czech Republic) | 0–2 | (Portugal) Porto |
|---|---|---|
| | Report | Drulović 77'; Jardel 84' |

Letná Stadium, Prague
Attendance: 14,625
Referee: Gilles Veissière (France)

8 December 1999
19:45

| Porto (Portugal) | 1–0 | (Germany) Hertha BSC |
|---|---|---|
| Drulović 79' | Report |

Estádio das Antas, Porto
Attendance: 24,222
Referee: Ryszard Wójcik (Poland)
8 December 1999
20:45

| Barcelona (Spain) | 5–0 | (Czech Republic) Sparta Prague |
|---|---|---|
| Kluivert 44', 63'; Luis Enrique 45', 76'; Guardiola 60' | Report |

Camp Nou, Barcelona
Attendance: 54,303
Referee: Pierluigi Collina (Italy)

1 March 2000
20:45

| Hertha BSC (Germany) | 1–1 | (Czech Republic) Sparta Prague |
|---|---|---|
| Veit 45' | Report | Siegl 84' |

Olympiastadion, Berlin
Attendance: 30,337
Referee: Claude Colombo (France)
1 March 2000
20:45

| Barcelona (Spain) | 4–2 | (Portugal) Porto |
|---|---|---|
| Rivaldo 16', 89'; F. De Boer 22'; Kluivert 45' | Report | Jardel 5', 79' |

Camp Nou, Barcelona
Attendance: 71,500
Referee: Paul Durkin (England)

7 March 2000
20:45

| Sparta Prague (Czech Republic) | 1–0 | (Germany) Hertha BSC |
|---|---|---|
| Fukal 90' | Report |

Letná Stadium, Prague
Attendance: 9,101
Referee: Anders Frisk (Sweden)
7 March 2000
19:45

| Porto (Portugal) | 0–2 | (Spain) Barcelona |
|---|---|---|
| | Report | Abelardo 37'; Rivaldo 59' |

Estádio das Antas, Porto
Attendance: 45,492
Referee: Stefano Braschi (Italy)

15 March 2000
20:45

| Barcelona (Spain) | 3–1 | (Germany) Hertha BSC |
|---|---|---|
| Xavi 11'; Gabri 48'; Kluivert 83' | Report | Alves 7' |

Camp Nou, Barcelona
Attendance: 60,327
Referee: Michel Piraux (Belgium)
15 March 2000
19:45

| Porto (Portugal) | 2–2 | (Czech Republic) Sparta Prague |
|---|---|---|
| Costa 16'; Capucho 64' | Report | Lokvenc 74'; Fukal 90' |

Estádio das Antas, Porto
Attendance: 27,200
Referee: Günter Benkö (Austria)

21 March 2000
20:45

| Hertha BSC (Germany) | 0–1 | (Portugal) Porto |
|---|---|---|
| | Report | Clayton 69' |

Olympiastadion, Berlin
Attendance: 30,506
Referee: Pierluigi Collina (Italy)
21 March 2000
20:45

| Sparta Prague (Czech Republic) | 1–2 | (Spain) Barcelona |
|---|---|---|
| Svoboda 18' | Report | Gabri 52', 89' |

Letná Stadium, Prague
Attendance: 20,224
Referee: Rune Pedersen (Norway)

=== Group B ===
| Pos | Team | Pld | W | D | L | GF | GA | GD | Pts | Qualification | MUN | VAL | FIO | BOR |
|---|---|---|---|---|---|---|---|---|---|---|---|---|---|---|
| 1 | (England) Manchester United | 6 | 4 | 1 | 1 | 10 | 4 | +6 | 13 | Advance to knockout stage | — | 3–0 | 3–1 | 2–0 |
| 2 | (Spain) Valencia | 6 | 3 | 1 | 2 | 9 | 5 | +4 | 10 | Advance to knockout stage | 0–0 | — | 2–0 | 3–0 |
| 3 | (Italy) Fiorentina | 6 | 2 | 2 | 2 | 7 | 8 | −1 | 8 | | 2–0 | 1–0 | — | 3–3 |
| 4 | (France) Bordeaux | 6 | 0 | 2 | 4 | 5 | 14 | −9 | 2 | | 1–2 | 1–4 | 0–0 | — |

Source: UEFA
23 November 1999
20:45

| Fiorentina (Italy) | 2–0 | (England) Manchester United |
|---|---|---|
| Batistuta 24'; Balbo 52' | Report |

Stadio Artemio Franchi, Florence
Attendance: 36,002
Referee: Bernd Heynemann (Germany)
23 November 1999
20:45

| Valencia (Spain) | 3–0 | (France) Bordeaux |
|---|---|---|
| Farinós 60'; Ilie 68'; González 90' | Report |

Mestalla, Valencia
Attendance: 24,272
Referee: Dick Jol (Netherlands)

8 December 1999
20:45

| Bordeaux (France) | 0–0 | (Italy) Fiorentina |
|---|---|---|
| | Report |

Parc Lescure, Bordeaux
Attendance: 21,987
Referee: Karl-Erik Nilsson (Sweden)
8 December 1999
19:45

| Manchester United (England) | 3–0 | (Spain) Valencia |
|---|---|---|
| Keane 38'; Solskjær 47'; Scholes 70' | Report |

Old Trafford, Manchester
Attendance: 54,606
Referee: Kim Milton Nielsen (Denmark)

1 March 2000
20:45

| Fiorentina (Italy) | 1–0 | (Spain) Valencia |
|---|---|---|
| Mijatović 19' (pen.) | Report |

Stadio Artemio Franchi, Florence
Attendance: 25,676
Referee: Markus Merk (Germany)
1 March 2000
19:45 (Note: The game started 45 minutes later than it was officially scheduled to, as there was a serious traffic incident that jammed the roads to Old Trafford and United officials decided to delay the game to give fans time to arrive.)

| Manchester United (England) | 2–0 | (France) Bordeaux |
|---|---|---|
| Giggs 42'; Sheringham 84' | Report |

Old Trafford, Manchester
Attendance: 59,786
Referee: Hartmut Strampe (Germany)

7 March 2000
20:45

| Valencia (Spain) | 2–0 | (Italy) Fiorentina |
|---|---|---|
| Ilie 35'; Mendieta 90' (pen.) | Report |

Mestalla, Valencia
Attendance: 32,871
Referee: Hellmut Krug (Germany)
7 March 2000
20:45

| Bordeaux (France) | 1–2 | (England) Manchester United |
|---|---|---|
| Pavon 9' | Report | Keane 33'; Solskjær 84' |

Parc Lescure, Bordeaux
Attendance: 30,130
Referee: Jan Wegereef (Netherlands)

15 March 2000
19:45

| Manchester United (England) | 3–1 | (Italy) Fiorentina |
|---|---|---|
| Cole 20'; Keane 33'; Yorke 70' | Report | Batistuta 16' |

Old Trafford, Manchester
Attendance: 59,926
Referee: Ryszard Wójcik (Poland)
15 March 2000
20:45

| Bordeaux (France) | 1–4 | (Spain) Valencia |
|---|---|---|
| Wiltord 54' | Report | Đukić 41'; Mendieta 47' (pen.); González 72'; Sánchez 90+3' |

Parc Lescure, Bordeaux
Attendance: 21,472
Referee: Fritz Stuchlik (Austria)

21 March 2000
20:45

| Fiorentina (Italy) | 3–3 | (France) Bordeaux |
|---|---|---|
| Chiesa 47' (pen.); Batistuta 61'; Rui Costa 64' | Report | Wiltord 4'; Zanotti 87'; Batlles 90' (pen.) |

Stadio Artemio Franchi, Florence
Attendance: 14,239
Referee: Dieter Schoch (Switzerland)
21 March 2000
20:45

| Valencia (Spain) | 0–0 | (England) Manchester United |
|---|---|---|
| | Report |

Mestalla, Valencia
Attendance: 40,419
Referee: Ľuboš Micheľ (Slovakia)

=== Group C ===
| Pos | Team | Pld | W | D | L | GF | GA | GD | Pts | Qualification | BAY | RMA | DKV | ROS |
|---|---|---|---|---|---|---|---|---|---|---|---|---|---|---|
| 1 | (Germany) Bayern Munich | 6 | 4 | 1 | 1 | 13 | 8 | +5 | 13 | Advance to knockout stage | — | 4–1 | 2–1 | 2–1 |
| 2 | (Spain) Real Madrid | 6 | 3 | 1 | 2 | 11 | 12 | −1 | 10 | Advance to knockout stage | 2–4 | — | 2–2 | 3–1 |
| 3 | (Ukraine) Dynamo Kyiv | 6 | 3 | 1 | 2 | 10 | 8 | +2 | 10 | | 2–0 | 1–2 | — | 2–1 |
| 4 | (Norway) Rosenborg | 6 | 0 | 1 | 5 | 5 | 11 | −6 | 1 | | 1–1 | 0–1 | 1–2 | — |

Source: UEFA
24 November 1999
21:45

| Dynamo Kyiv (Ukraine) | 1–2 | (Spain) Real Madrid |
|---|---|---|
| Rebrov 86' (pen.) | Report | Morientes 17'; Raúl 48' |

Olimpiyskiy NSC, Kyiv
Attendance: 17,500
Referee: David Elleray (England)
24 November 1999
20:45

| Rosenborg (Norway) | 1–1 | (Germany) Bayern Munich |
|---|---|---|
| Skammelsrud 47' | Report | Jancker 6' |

Lerkendal Stadion, Trondheim
Attendance: 14,167
Referee: Stefano Braschi (Italy)

7 December 1999
20:45

| Bayern Munich (Germany) | 2–1 | (Ukraine) Dynamo Kyiv |
|---|---|---|
| Jancker 6'; Paulo Sérgio 80' | Report | Rebrov 50' |

Olympiastadion, Munich
Attendance: 18,000
Referee: Hugh Dallas (Scotland)
7 December 1999
20:45

| Real Madrid (Spain) | 3–1 | (Norway) Rosenborg |
|---|---|---|
| Raúl 16'; Sávio 85'; Roberto Carlos 90' | Report | Carew 48' |

Santiago Bernabéu, Madrid
Attendance: 16,500
Referee: Michel Piraux (Belgium)

29 February 2000
20:45

| Real Madrid (Spain) | 2–4 | (Germany) Bayern Munich |
|---|---|---|
| Morientes 25'; Raúl 48' | Report | Scholl 21'; Effenberg 24'; Fink 39'; Paulo Sérgio 67' |

Santiago Bernabéu, Madrid
Attendance: 45,000
Referee: Kim Milton Nielsen (Denmark)
29 February 2000
21:45

| Dynamo Kyiv (Ukraine) | 2–1 | (Norway) Rosenborg |
|---|---|---|
| Khatskevich 2'; Rebrov 29' | Report | Jakobsen 48' |

Olimpiyskiy NSC, Kyiv
Attendance: 36,000
Referee: Lubos Michel (Slovakia)

8 March 2000
20:45

| Rosenborg (Norway) | 1–2 | (Ukraine) Dynamo Kyiv |
|---|---|---|
| Ø. Berg 38' | Report | Rebrov 32', 68' |

Lerkendal Stadion, Trondheim
Attendance: 13,067
Referee: Alain Hamer (Luxembourg)
8 March 2000
20:45

| Bayern Munich (Germany) | 4–1 | (Spain) Real Madrid |
|---|---|---|
| Scholl 4'; Élber 30'; Zickler 79', 90' | Report | Helguera 50' |

Olympiastadion, Munich
Attendance: 60,000
Referee: Dick Jol (Netherlands)

14 March 2000
20:45

| Bayern Munich (Germany) | 2–1 | (Norway) Rosenborg |
|---|---|---|
| Scholl 11'; Paulo Sérgio 40' | Report | Carew 64' |

Olympiastadion, Munich
Attendance: 20,000
Referee: Alfredo Trentalange (Italy)
14 March 2000
20:45

| Real Madrid (Spain) | 2–2 | (Ukraine) Dynamo Kyiv |
|---|---|---|
| Raúl 14' (pen.); Roberto Carlos 72' | Report | Khatskevich 42'; Hierro 56' (o.g.) |

Santiago Bernabéu, Madrid
Attendance: 38,200
Referee: Alain Sars (France)

22 March 2000
21:45

| Dynamo Kyiv (Ukraine) | 2–0 | (Germany) Bayern Munich |
|---|---|---|
| Kaladze 34'; Demetradze 71' | Report |

Olimpiyskiy NSC, Kyiv
Attendance: 70,000
Referee: Gilles Veissière (France)
22 March 2000
20:45

| Rosenborg (Norway) | 0–1 | (Spain) Real Madrid |
|---|---|---|
| | Report | Raúl 3' |

Lerkendal Stadion, Trondheim
Attendance: 12,653
Referee: Nikolay Levnikov (Russia)

=== Group D ===
| Pos | Team | Pld | W | D | L | GF | GA | GD | Pts | Qualification | LAZ | CHE | FEY | MAR |
|---|---|---|---|---|---|---|---|---|---|---|---|---|---|---|
| 1 | (Italy) Lazio | 6 | 3 | 2 | 1 | 10 | 4 | +6 | 11 | Advance to knockout stage | — | 0–0 | 1–2 | 5–1 |
| 2 | (England) Chelsea | 6 | 3 | 1 | 2 | 8 | 5 | +3 | 10 | Advance to knockout stage | 1–2 | — | 3–1 | 1–0 |
| 3 | (Netherlands) Feyenoord | 6 | 2 | 2 | 2 | 7 | 7 | 0 | 8 | | 0–0 | 1–3 | — | 3–0 |
| 4 | (France) Marseille | 6 | 1 | 1 | 4 | 2 | 11 | −9 | 4 | | 0–2 | 1–0 | 0–0 | — |

Source: UEFA
24 November 1999
19:45

| Chelsea (England) | 3–1 | (Netherlands) Feyenoord |
|---|---|---|
| Babayaro 45'; Flo 67', 85' | Report | Cruz 89' |

Stamford Bridge, London
Attendance: 29,704
Referee: José García Aranda (Spain)
24 November 1999
20:45

| Marseille (France) | 0–2 | (Italy) Lazio |
|---|---|---|
| | Report | Stanković 64'; Conceição 77' |

Stade Vélodrome, Marseille
Attendance: 42,261
Referee: Manuel Díaz Vega (Spain)

7 December 1999
20:45

| Lazio (Italy) | 0–0 | (England) Chelsea |
|---|---|---|
| | Report |

Stadio Olimpico, Rome
Attendance: 38,662
Referee: Hellmut Krug (Germany)
7 December 1999
20:45

| Feyenoord (Netherlands) | 3–0 | (France) Marseille |
|---|---|---|
| Cruz 72', 90'; Bosvelt 83' | Report |

De Kuip, Rotterdam
Attendance: 38,500
Referee: Vítor Melo Pereira (Portugal)

29 February 2000
20:45

| Lazio (Italy) | 1–2 | (Netherlands) Feyenoord |
|---|---|---|
| Verón 37' | Report | Tomasson 78', 84' |

Stadio Olimpico, Rome
Attendance: 17,883
Referee: Antonio López Nieto (Spain)
29 February 2000
20:45

| Marseille (France) | 1–0 | (England) Chelsea |
|---|---|---|
| Pires 16' | Report |

Stade Vélodrome, Marseille
Attendance: 24,700
Referee: Rune Pedersen (Norway)

8 March 2000
19:45

| Chelsea (England) | 1–0 | (France) Marseille |
|---|---|---|
| Wise 27' | Report |

Stamford Bridge, London
Attendance: 33,206
Referee: Juan Fernandez Marin (Spain)
8 March 2000
20:45

| Feyenoord (Netherlands) | 0–0 | (Italy) Lazio |
|---|---|---|
| | Report |

De Kuip, Rotterdam
Attendance: 45,356
Referee: Günter Benkö (Austria)

14 March 2000
20:45

| Lazio (Italy) | 5–1 | (France) Marseille |
|---|---|---|
| Inzaghi 17', 37', 38', 71'; Bokšić 82' | Report | Leroy 50' |

Stadio Olimpico, Rome
Attendance: 28,875
Referee: Anders Frisk (Sweden)
14 March 2000
20:45

| Feyenoord (Netherlands) | 1–3 | (England) Chelsea |
|---|---|---|
| Kalou 59' | Report | Zola 39'; Wise 64'; Flo 89' |

De Kuip, Rotterdam
Attendance: 43,155
Referee: Knud Erik Fisker (Denmark)

22 March 2000
20:45

| Marseille (France) | 0–0 | (Netherlands) Feyenoord |
|---|---|---|
| | Report |

Stade Vélodrome, Marseille
Attendance: 9,000
Referee: Arturo Daudén Ibáñez (Spain)
22 March 2000
19:45

| Chelsea (England) | 1–2 | (Italy) Lazio |
|---|---|---|
| Poyet 45' | Report | Inzaghi 55'; Mihajlović 66' |

Stamford Bridge, London
Attendance: 34,260
Referee: Vítor Melo Pereira (Portugal)
