= Meca (footballer) =

Spanish footballer

Personal information
- Full name: José Manuel Meca García
- Date of birth: 19 January 1978 (age 48)
- Place of birth: Águilas, Spain
- Height: 1.80 m (5 ft 11 in)
- Position: Forward

Senior career*
Years	Team	Apps	(Gls)
1995–1997	Real Madrid C	50	(11)
1995–2001	Real Madrid B	40	(12)
1998–1999	→ Cultural Leonesa (loan)	22	(1)
1999–2001	Real Madrid	10	(1)
2001–2004	Elche	60	(15)
2005	Racing de Ferrol	9	(0)
2005	Real Jaén	14	(1)
2006–2007	Lanzarote	54	(24)
2007–2009	Gramenet	72	(33)
2009–2010	Orihuela	22	(8)
2010	Atlético Ciudad	13	(6)
2010–2011	Lorca Atlético	28	(4)
Total		394	(116)
- * Club domestic league appearances and goals

José Manuel Meca García (born 19 January 1978), commonly known as Meca, is a retired Spanish footballer who played as a forward.

== Career statistics ==
=== Club ===
Club	Season	League			Cup		Other		Total	
Club	Season	Division	Apps	Goals	Apps	Goals	Apps	Goals	Apps	Goals
Real Madrid C	1995–96	Segunda División B	22	3	–		0	0	22	3
Real Madrid C	1996–97	Segunda División B	28	8	–		0	0	28	8
Real Madrid C	Total		50	11	0	0	0	0	50	11
Real Madrid B	1995–96	Segunda División	1	0	–		0	0	1	0
Real Madrid B	1996–97	Segunda División	1	0	–		0	0	1	0
Real Madrid B	1997–98	Segunda División B	11	1	–		0	0	11	1
Real Madrid B	1998–99	Segunda División B	0	0	–		0	0	0	0
Real Madrid B	1999–00	Segunda División B	12	1	–		0	0	12	1
Real Madrid B	2000–01	Segunda División B	15	10	–		0	0	15	10
Real Madrid B	Total		40	12	0	0	0	0	40	12
Cultural Leonesa (loan)	1998–99	Segunda División B	22	1	0	0	4 (Note: Appearances in the Segunda División B play-offs)	1	26	2
Real Madrid	1999–00	La Liga	10	1	3 (Note: Appearances in the Copa del Rey)	0	1 (Note: Appearances in the UEFA Champions League)	0	14	1
Elche	2001–02	Segunda División	21	6	1	0	0	0	22	6
Elche	2002–03	Segunda División	30	8	1	0	0	0	31	8
Elche	2003–04	Segunda División	9	1	0	0	0	0	9	1
Elche	Total		60	15	2	0	0	0	62	15
Racing de Ferrol	2004–05	Segunda División	9	0	0	0	0	0	9	0
Real Jaén	2005–06	Segunda División B	14	1	0	0	0	0	14	1
Lanzarote	2005–06	Segunda División B	16	8	0	0	0	0	16	8
Lanzarote	2006–07	Segunda División B	38	16	0	0	0	0	38	16
Lanzarote	Total		54	25	0	0	0	0	54	24
Gramenet	2007–08	Segunda División B	35	14	0	0	0	0	35	14
Gramenet	2008–09	Segunda División B	37	19	0	0	0	0	37	19
Gramenet	Total		72	33	0	0	0	0	72	33
Orihuela	2009–10	Segunda División B	22	8	0	0	0	0	22	8
Atlético Ciudad	2009–10	Segunda División B	13	6	0	0	0	0	13	6
Lorca Atlético	2010–11	Segunda División B	28	4	0	0	0	0	28	4
Career total			394	116	5	0	5	1	404	117
