= Vítor Melo Pereira =

Portuguese football referee

- Full name: Vítor Manuel Melo Pereira
- Born: 21 April 1957 (age 69); Lisbon, Portugal

Domestic
Years	League	Role
1989–2002	Primeira Liga	Referee

International
Years	League	Role
1992–2002	FIFA-listed	Referee

Vítor Manuel Melo Pereira (born 21 April 1957) is a retired football referee from Portugal, best known for supervising four matches at the FIFA World Cup: two in 1998 and 2002.

Since August 2017 he was the head of Greek refereeing appointed directly by FIFA.

On 23 September 2021, he was hired by the Russian Football Union to head their refereeing department, replacing Viktor Kassai. On 15 March 2022, he resigned from the RFU position.

Preceded by UEFA Cup Final 2001 (France) Gilles Veissière	UEFA Cup Final Referees; Final 2002 (Portugal) Vítor Melo Pereira	Succeeded by UEFA Cup Final 2003 (Slovakia) Ľuboš Micheľ
