= Gilles Veissière =

French football referee

- Born: 18 September 1959 (age 67); Nice, France

Domestic
Years	League	Role
1990–2004	Ligue 1	Referee

International
Years	League	Role
1992–2004	FIFA–listed	Referee

Gilles Veissière (born 18 September 1959, in Nice) is a football referee from France, best known for supervising two matches during the 2002 FIFA World Cup in South Korea and Japan. He also led two matches at the 2000 and 2004 UEFA European Football Championship, and has refereed numerous UEFA Champions League matches. He was selected for the FIFA Europe vs. Rest of the World match to accompany the World Cup draw in Marseille in 1997.

Veissière is known to have served as a FIFA referee during the period from 1994 to 2004. He also officiated in numerous other international competitions, including the 1997 FIFA World Youth Championship, qualifying matches for the 1998, 2002, and 2006 World Cups, and qualifying matches for Euro 1996, Euro 2000, and Euro 2004.

Preceded by UEFA Cup Final 2000 (Spain) Antonio López Nieto	UEFA Cup Final Referees; Final 2001 (France) Gilles Veissière	Succeeded by UEFA Cup Final 2002 (Portugal) Vítor Melo Pereira
