= Nikolai Levnikov =

Russian football referee (born 1956)

- Full name: Nikolai Vladislavovich Levnikov
- Born: 15 May 1956 (age 70); Pinsk, Soviet Union now Belarus

Domestic
| Years | League | Role |
| 1989–2001 | Russian Football Premier League | Referee |

International
| Years | League | Role |
| 1990–2001 | FIFA-listed | Referee |

Nikolai Vladislavovich Levnikov (Russian: Николай Владиславович Левников; born 15 May 1956 in Pinsk, Belarus) is a retired Russian football referee. He is known for having refereed one match in the 1998 FIFA World Cup in France.

He is known to have served as a FIFA referee during the period from 1993 to 2001. Levnikov was active at numerous international tournaments. He refereed the Group D contest between Turkey and Denmark at the 1996 UEFA European Football Championship in England and two matches in the 1997 FIFA Confederations Cup in Saudi Arabia. He also officiated in the 1995 FIFA World Youth Championship and qualifiers for Euro 1996 and Euro 2000, in addition to 1998 and 2002 World Cup qualifiers.

His son Kirill Levnikov became FIFA referee in 2016.
