= Stefano Braschi =

Italian football referee (born 1957)

- Full name: Stefano Braschi
- Born: 6 June 1957 (age 69); Barberino di Mugello, Italy
- Other occupation: Commercial agent

Domestic
Years	League	Role
1992–2002	Serie B / Serie A	Referee

International
Years	League	Role
1996–2002	FIFA listed	Referee

Stefano Braschi (born 6 June 1957 in Barberino di Mugello, Florence) is a retired Italian football referee.

== Career ==
Domestically, Braschi officiated in two Coppa Italia finals in 1997 and 1999. At international level, Braschi officiated in qualifying matches for the 1998 and 2002 World Cups, as well as a Euro 2000 preliminary match between Poland and Bulgaria. He also served as a referee for major international club contests, taking charge of the 2000 UEFA Champions League Final, the 1998 UEFA Cup Winners' Cup Final, and two matches at the 2000 FIFA Club World Championship.

== Personal life ==
Stefano Braschi is married to his wife, Paola. The pair have three adopted children. He is fluent in Italian, English and French.

== Major matches refereed ==
Date	Match	Tournament	Venue	Result	Ref
13 May 1998	Chelsea vs. VfB Stuttgart	1998 UEFA Cup Winners' Cup Final	Råsunda Stadium, Stockholm	1–0	
24 May 2000	Real Madrid vs. Valencia	2000 UEFA Champions League final	Stade de France, Saint-Denis	3–0	

== Honours ==
- Serie A Referee of the Year (2): 1999, 2001
- Premio Giovanni Mauro for Best Italian International Referee of the Season: 1998
- Italian Football Hall of Fame: 2014

Preceded by UEFA Cup Winners' Cup Final 1997 (Germany) Markus Merk	UEFA Cup Winners' Cup Final Referees; Final 1998 (Italy) Stefano Braschi	Succeeded by UEFA Cup Winners' Cup Final 1999 (Austria) Günter Benkö
Preceded by UEFA Champions League Final 1999 (Italy) Pierluigi Collina	UEFA Champions League Final Referees; Final 2000 (Italy) Stefano Braschi	Succeeded by UEFA Champions League Final 2001 (Netherlands) Dick Jol
