= 2000–01 AC Fiorentina season =

Fiorentina
2000–01 season
- President: Vittorio Cecchi Gori
- Manager: Fatih Terim (until 25 February 2001); Luciano Chiarugi (until 5 March 2001); Roberto Mancini
- Stadium: Artemio Franchi
- Serie A: 9th
- Coppa Italia: Winners (into UEFA Cup)
- UEFA Cup: First round
- Top goalscorer: League: Enrico Chiesa (22); All: Enrico Chiesa (27)
- Average home league attendance: 29,644
Home colours	Away colours	Third colours

During the 2000–01 season, Fiorentina competed in the Serie A, Coppa Italia and UEFA Cup.

== Summary ==
Associazione Calcio Fiorentina fell a couple of steps back in its first season following striker Gabriel Batistuta's departure. While Batistuta finally won a long overdue Serie A title with Roma, Fiorentina had a struggling season, where coach Fatih Terim suddenly resigned and accepted the same job in Milan instead, and the club sensationally opted for recently retired Roberto Mancini to take over.

Although respectability in the league was upheld by goalkeeper Francesco Toldo, playmaker Rui Costa and striker Enrico Chiesa, both Toldo and Rui Costa departed for the Milanese clubs in the summer of 2001, as president Vittorio Cecchi Gori desperately tried to save a collapsing economy. Even though the top players of the club held very high standards, the depth in the squad was not at a very strong level, which would ensure 2001-02 to be a testing time for the Florence faithful.

The cup title was some consolation for the worries, with Paolo Vanoli scoring the winner against Parma in the first final, then drawing 1–1 at home, when Portuguese international Nuno Gomes scored the all-important equaliser.

== Players ==
Note: Flags indicate national team as defined under FIFA eligibility rules; some limited exceptions apply. Players may hold more than one non-FIFA nationality.

No.	Pos.	Nation	Player
1	GK	ITA	Francesco Toldo
4	DF	ITA	Daniele Adani
23	DF	ITA	Alessandro Pierini
2	DF	CZE	Tomáš Řepka
14	DF	ITA	Paolo Vanoli
7	MF	ITA	Angelo Di Livio
24	MF	ITA	Christian Amoroso
30	MF	ITA	Mauro Bressan
10	MF	POR	Rui Costa
20	FW	ITA	Enrico Chiesa
21	FW	POR	Nuno Gomes
33	GK	ITA	Giuseppe Taglialatela
3	DF	ITA	Moreno Torricelli
19	FW	ITA	Marco Rossi
18	MF	ITA	Sandro Cois
11	MF	ITA	Fabio Rossitto
5	DF	CIV	Saliou Lassissi

No.	Pos.	Nation	Player
9	MF	BRA	Leandro
35	DF	ITA	Emiliano Moretti
8	FW	YUG	Predrag Mijatović
15	MF	BRA	Amaral
27	DF	ITA	Andrea Tarozzi
26	DF	ITA	Giovanni Bartolucci
29	MF	ITA	Roberto Massaro
36	DF	ITA	Giacomo Bonora
6	DF	ITA	Aldo Firicano
16	MF	ITA	Domenico Morfeo
31	FW	ITA	Riccardo Taddei
25	DF	ITA	Daniele Ficagna
38	MF	ITA	Francesco Sorbino
39	DF	ITA	Niccolò Guzzo
12	GK	ITA	Gianmatteo Mareggini
17	MF	ITA	Angelo Palombo
37	FW	GRE	Georgios Vakouftsis

=== Transfers ===
In
Pos.	Name	from	Type
FW	Nuno Gomes	Benfica	
MF	Domenico Morfeo	Cagliari Calcio	loan ended
MF	Leandro	Portuguesa	
MF	Amaral	Benfica	
MF	Giovanni Bartolucci		
DF	Paolo Vanoli	Parma F.C.	
DF	Saliou Lassissi	Parma F.C.	loan
FW	Marco Rossi	Salernitana	

Out
Pos.	Name	To	Type
FW	Gabriel Batistuta	A.S. Roma	
MF	Jörg Heinrich	Borussia Dortmund	
DF	Pasquale Padalino	Bologna F.C.	
MF	Guillermo Amor	Villarreal C.F.	
MF	Paul Okon	Middlesbrough F.C.	
FW	Abel Balbo	A.S. Roma	
MF	Domenico Morfeo	Atalanta B.C.	loan
FW	Georgios Vakouftsis	Ravenna Calcio	loan

== Competitions ==
=== Serie A ===
==== League table ====
Pos	Team	Pld	W	D	L	GF	GA	GD	Pts	Qualification or relegation
7	Atalanta	34	10	14	10	38	34	+4	44 (Note: Atalanta finished ahead of Brescia on head-to-head points: Atalanta 2–0 Brescia, Brescia 0–3 Atalanta.)	
8	Brescia (Note: Brescia gained entry to the 2001 UEFA Intertoto Cup after Atalanta declined.)	34	10	14	10	44	42	+2	44	Qualification to Intertoto Cup third round
9	Fiorentina (Note: Fiorentina gained entry to the 2001–02 UEFA Cup as the 2000–01 Coppa Italia champions.)	34	10	13	11	53	52	+1	43	Qualification to UEFA Cup first round
10	Bologna	34	11	10	13	49	53	−4	43	
11	Perugia	34	10	12	12	49	53	−4	42	

Source: 2000–01 Serie A, Soccerway, RSSSF.com
Rules for classification: 1) Points; 2) Head-to-head points; 3) Head-to-head goal difference; 4) Goal difference; 5) Goals scored; 6) Draw. (Note: Head-to-head record is used only after all the matches between the teams in question have been played).

==== Results summary ====
Overall								Home						Away					
Pld	W	D	L	GF	GA	GD	Pts	W	D	L	GF	GA	GD	W	D	L	GF	GA	GD
34	10	13	11	53	52	+1	43	8	4	5	32	25	+7	2	9	6	21	27	−6

Last updated: 17 June 2001.
Source: Competitive matches

==== Results by round ====
Round	1	2	3	4	5	6	7	8	9	10	11	12	13	14	15	16	17	18	19	20	21	22	23	24	25	26	27	28	29	30	31	32	33	34
Ground	A	H	A	H	H	A	H	A	A	H	A	H	A	H	A	H	A	H	A	H	A	A	H	A	H	H	A	H	A	H	A	H	A	H
Result	D	W	D	D	L	D	W	L	D	W	W	W	D	W	D	L	L	L	D	D	L	D	D	D	W	W	L	W	L	L	W	D	L	L
Position	6	3	6	7	10	11	9	11	11	9	6	5	4	3	4	5	6	8	8	10	11	11	10	10	9	8	9	9	9	10	8	8	8	9

Source: Competitive matches
A = Away; H = Home; W = Win; D = Draw; L = Loss; P = Postponed; = Leader, 2001–02 UEFA Champions League Group stage; = 2001–02 UEFA Champions League Group stage; = 2001–02 UEFA Champions League Qualifying round; = 2001–02 UEFA Cup First round; = Qualification to Intertoto Cup; = 2001–02 Serie B; C = 2001–02 UEFA Cup First round

==== Matches ====
1 October 2000 1	Parma	2–2	Fiorentina	Parma
	M. Amoroso 5', 92'	Report	64' Pierini; 82' C. Amoroso	Stadium: Il Tardini; Attendance: 17,187

15 October 2000 2	Fiorentina	2–1	Reggina	Florence
	Nuno Gomes 86'; Leandro 91'	Report	68' Marazzina	Stadium: Stadio Artemio Franchi; Attendance: 26,868

22 October 2000 3	Brescia	1–1	Fiorentina	Brescia
	Hübner 50'	Report	70' Leandro	Stadium: Stadio Mario Rigamonti; Attendance: 16,208

1 November 2000 4	Fiorentina	2–2	Bari	Florence
	Rui Costa 32'; Nuno Gomes 88'	Report	Masinga 72'; Cassano 80'	Stadium: Stadio Artemio Franchi; Attendance: 27,580

4 November 2000 5	Fiorentina	3–4	Perugia	Florence
	Di Livio 22'; Leandro 45+3', 77'		Vryzas 39', 50', 65'; Saudati 42' (pen.)	Stadium: Stadio Artemio Franchi; Attendance: 25,671

12 November 2000 6	Bologna	1–1	Fiorentina	Bologna
	Cruz 38'		Leandro 64' (pen.)	Stadium: Stadio Renato Dall'Ara; Attendance: 24,756

19 November 2000 7	Fiorentina	3–2	Vicenza	Florence
	Nuno Gomes 10', 51'; Adani 75'		Toni 44'; Comotto 45+1'	Stadium: Stadio Artemio Franchi; Attendance: 26,740

26 November 2000 8	Roma	1–0	Fiorentina	Rome
	Batistuta 82'			Stadium: Stadio Olimpico; Attendance: 65,787

3 December 2000 9	Lecce	1–1	Fiorentina	Lecce
	Conticchio 11'		Chiesa 54' (pen.)	Stadium: Stadio Via del Mare; Attendance: 12,238

10 December 2000 10	Fiorentina	2–0	Internazionale	Florence
	Rui Costa 49'; Chiesa 90'			Stadium: Stadio Artemio Franchi; Attendance: 34,239

17 December 2000 11	Udinese	1–3	Fiorentina	Udine
	Jørgensen 8'		Chiesa 38'; Sottil 65' (o.g.); Rui Costa 67'	Stadium: Stadio Friuli; Attendance: 18,843

23 December 2000 12	Fiorentina	2–0	Hellas Verona	Florence
	Chiesa 22' (pen.), 50'			Stadium: Stadio Artemio Franchi; Attendance: 28,672

6 January 2001 13	Juventus	3–3	Fiorentina	Turin
	Conte 33'; Inzaghi 49' (pen.), 57'		Chiesa 5', 64'; Nuno Gomes 18'	Stadium: Stadio delle Alpi; Attendance: 41,933

13 January 2001 14	Fiorentina	4–0	Milan	Florence
	Nuno Gomes 15'; Cois 47'; Chiesa 72'; Rui Costa 87'			Stadium: Stadio Artemio Franchi; Attendance: 39,241

21 January 2001 15	Atalanta	0–0	Fiorentina	Bergamo
				Stadium: Stadio Atleti Azzurri d'Italia; Attendance: 18,264

28 January 2001 16	Fiorentina	1–4	Lazio	Florence
	Chiesa 82' (pen.)		Nedvěd 33'; Crespo 58', 74'; Salas 85'	Stadium: Stadio Artemio Franchi; Attendance: 33,590

4 February 2001 17	Napoli	1–0	Fiorentina	Palermo
	Pecchia 90'			Stadium: Stadio Renzo Barbera; Attendance: 28,000

11 February 2001 18	Fiorentina	0–1	Parma	Florence
		Report	Conceição 6'	Stadium: Stadio Artemio Franchi; Attendance: 27,494; Referee: Roberto Rosetti

18 February 2001 19	Reggina	1–1	Fiorentina	Reggio Calabria
	Zanchetta 45'	Report	Chiesa 11'	Stadium: Stadio Oreste Granillo; Attendance: 23,642; Referee: Stefano Farina

25 February 2001 20	Fiorentina	2–2	Brescia	Florence
	Chiesa 23'; Nuno Gomes 62'	Report	R. Baggio 4', 66'	Stadium: Stadio Artemio Franchi; Attendance: 25,720; Referee: Fiorenzo Treossi

4 March 2001 21	Bari	2–1	Fiorentina	Bari
	Cassano 43'; Andersson 87' (pen.)	Report	Rui Costa 40'	Stadium: Stadio Nicola; Attendance: 9,916; Referee: Emilio Pellegrino

11 March 2001 22	Perugia	2–2	Fiorentina	Perugia
	Di Loreto 23'; Liverani 45+2'	Report	Chiesa 57'; Lassissi 66'	Stadium: Stadio Renato Curi; Attendance: 9,898; Referee: Massimo De Santis

18 March 2001 23	Fiorentina	1–1	Bologna	Florence
	Mijatović 54'	Report	Cipriani 14'	Stadium: Stadio Artemio Franchi; Attendance: 28,331; Referee: Stefano Farina

31 March 2001 24	Vicenza	1–1	Fiorentina	Vicenza
	Řepka 10' (o.g.)	Report	Rui Costa 76'	Stadium: Stadio Romeo Menti; Attendance: 15,628; Referee: Alfredo Trentalange

9 April 2001 25	Fiorentina	3–1	Roma	Florence
	Chiesa 12', 82'; Candela 57' (o.g.)	Report	Emerson 30'	Stadium: Stadio Artemio Franchi; Attendance: 34,140; Referee: Stefano Farina

14 April 2001 26	Fiorentina	2–0	Lecce	Florence
	Chiesa 6', 82'	Report		Stadium: Stadio Artemio Franchi; Attendance: 26,860; Referee: Domenico Messina

21 April 2001 27	Internazionale	4–2	Fiorentina	Milan
	Vieri 11', 40' (pen.); Dalmat 43'; Şükür 57'	Report	42' Lassissi; 64' Bressan; 79'Chiesa	Stadium: San Siro; Attendance: 51,662; Referee: Alfredo Trentalange

29 April 2001 28	Fiorentina	2–1	Udinese	Florence
	Chiesa 52', 56'	Report	Muzzi 12'	Stadium: Stadio Artemio Franchi; Attendance: 28,077; Referee: Salvatore Racalbuto

6 May 2001 29	Hellas Verona	2–1	Fiorentina	Verona
	Salvetti 63'; Italiano 72'	Report	Chiesa 90'	Stadium: Stadio Marc'Antonio Bentegodi; Attendance: 17,677; Referee: Massimo De Santis

11 May 2001 30	Fiorentina	1–3	Juventus	Florence
	Cois 30'; Rossi 40'	Report	Zidane 24'; Tudor 28'; Trezeguet 89'	Stadium: Stadio Artemio Franchi; Attendance: 36,714; Referee: Graziano Cesari

17 May 2001 31	Milan	1–2	Fiorentina	Milan
	Shevchenko 28'	Report	Chiesa 11', 18'	Stadium: San Siro; Attendance: 44,699; Referee: Pasquale Rodomonti

27 May 2001 32	Fiorentina	1–1	Atalanta	Florence
	Nuno Gomes 13'	Report	Doni 20' (pen.)	Stadium: Stadio Artemio Franchi; Attendance: 25,683; Referee: Alfredo Trentalange

10 June 2001 33	Lazio	3–0	Fiorentina	Rome
	Pierini 34' (o.g.); Crespo 44'; Negro 55'	Report		Stadium: Stadio Olimpico; Attendance: 42,052; Referee: Pierluigi Collina

17 June 2001 34	Fiorentina	1–2	Napoli	Florence
	Nuno Gomes 83'	Report	Amoruso 48'; Edmundo 90+4'	Stadium: Stadio Artemio Franchi; Attendance: 28,321; Referee: Alfredo Trentalange

=== Coppa Italia ===
==== Round of 16 ====
17 September 2000 First leg	Salernitana	0–5	Fiorentina	Salerno

24 September 2000 Second leg	Fiorentina	3–1	Salernitana	Florence
				Stadium: Artemio Franchi

==== Quarter-finals ====
29 November 2000 First leg	Fiorentina	6–0	Brescia Calcio	Florence
	Leandro 28'; Bressan 35'; Chiesa 39'; Chiesa 57'; Leandro 64'; Rui Costa 72'			Stadium: Artemio Franchi; Referee: Emilio Pellegrino

13 December 2000 Second leg	Brescia Calcio	3–1	Fiorentina	Brescia
	Yllana 45'; Orlandini 70' (rig); Correa 82'		53' Leandro	Stadium: Mario Rigamonti; Referee: Zaltron

==== Semi-finals ====
25 January 2001 First leg	AC Milan	2–2	Fiorentina	Milan
	Ambrosini 66'; Giunti 92'	Report	17' Chiesa; 75' Bressan	Stadium: San Siro; Attendance: 7 000; Referee: Gennaro Borriello

7 February 2001 Second leg	Fiorentina	2–0	AC Milan	Florence
	Chiesa 42'; Rui Costa 82'	Report		Stadium: Artemio Franchi; Attendance: 25 000; Referee: Gennaro Borriello

==== Final ====
24 May 2001 First leg	Parma	0–1	Fiorentina	Parma
21:00			Vanoli 87'	Stadium: Il Tardini; Attendance: 17,685; Referee: Gennaro Borriello

13 June 2001 Second leg	Fiorentina	1–1	Parma	Florence
21:00	Nuno Gomes 65'		Milošević 38'	Stadium: Artemio Franchi; Attendance: 37,664; Referee: Massimo De Santis

=== UEFA Cup ===
==== First round ====
14 September 2000 First leg	Tirol Innsbruck (Austria)	3–1	(Italy) Fiorentina	Innsbruck, Austria
20:30 CEST (UTC+02:00)	Gilewicz 28', 49', (yellow card) 55'; Kogler (yellow card) 34'; Baur 45' (pen.); Mair (yellow card) 60'; Kirchler (yellow card) 74'; Brzęczek (yellow card) 78'	Report	Di Livio (yellow card) 12'; Adani (yellow card) 46'; Mijatović 53'	Stadium: Tivoli Neu; Attendance: 13,190; Referee: Jorge Emanuel Monteiro Coroado (Portugal)

28 September 2000 Second leg	Fiorentina (Italy)	2–2 (3–5 agg.)	(Austria) Tirol Innsbruck	Florence, Italy
20:30 CEST (UTC+02:00)	Rossitto (yellow card) 18'; Mijatović 25', (yellow card) 30'; Di Livio (yellow card) 30'; Torricelli (yellow card) 59'; Leandro 61', (yellow card) 62'; Vanoli (yellow card) 72'	Report	Mair 8'; Hörtnagl (yellow card) 31'; Marasek (yellow card) 39'; Scharrer (yellow card) 48'; Brzęczek (yellow card) 74'; Gilewicz 87', (yellow card) 88' (yellow-red card)	Stadium: Stadio Artemio Franchi; Referee: Orhan Erdemir (Turkey)

== Statistics ==
=== Players statistics ===
No.	Pos	Nat	Player	Total		Serie A		Coppa		UEFA	
No.	Pos	Nat	Player	Apps	Goals	Apps	Goals	Apps	Goals	Apps	Goals
1	GK	(Italy) ITA	Toldo	40	-56	32	-48	6	-3	2	-5
4	DF	(Italy) ITA	Adani	34	1	22+3	1	7	0	2	0
23	DF	(Italy) ITA	Pierini	35	1	26+1	1	6	0	2	0
2	DF	(Czech Republic) CZE	Repka	36	0	24+4	0	7	0	1	0
14	DF	(Italy) ITA	Vanoli	37	2	25+2	0	8	2	2	0
7	MF	(Italy) ITA	Di Livio	43	1	32+1	1	8	0	2	0
24	MF	(Italy) ITA	Amoroso	29	1	23+3	1	2	0	1	0
30	MF	(Italy) ITA	Bressan	38	3	19+10	1	8	2	1	0
10	MF	(Portugal) POR	Rui Costa	38	8	28+1	6	7	2	2	0
20	FW	(Italy) ITA	Chiesa	38	27	24+6	22	6	5	2	0
21	FW	(Portugal) POR	Nuno Gomes	35	13	27+3	9	5	4	0	0
33	GK	(Italy) ITA	Taglialatela	5	-8	2+1	-4	2	-4	0	0
3	DF	(Italy) ITA	Torricelli	31	0	18+6	0	5	0	2	0
19	FW	(Italy) ITA	Rossi	27	2	14+7	1	5	1	1	0
18	MF	(Italy) ITA	Cois	15	1	11+3	1	1	0	0	0
11	MF	(Italy) ITA	Rossitto	23	0	10+8	0	4	0	1	0
5	DF	(Ivory Coast) CIV	Lassissi	18	1	9+5	1	3	0	1	0
9	MF	(Brazil) BRA	Leandro	24	9	9+10	5	3	3	2	1
35	DF	(Italy) ITA	Moretti	13	0	8+1	0	4	0	0	0
8	FW	(Federal Republic of Yugoslavia) YUG	Mijatovic	19	5	4+9	1	4	2	2	2
15	MF	(Brazil) BRA	Amaral	10	0	4+4	0	2	0	0	0
27	DF	(Italy) ITA	Tarozzi	8	0	1+3	0	3	0	1	0
26	DF	(Italy) ITA	Bartolucci	1	0	1	0	0	0	0	0
29	MF	(Italy) ITA	Massaro	1	0	1	0	0	0	0	0
36	DF	(Italy) ITA	Bonora	2	0	0+2	0	0	0	0	0
6	DF	(Italy) ITA	Firicano	5	0	0+3	0	2	0	0	0
16	MF	(Italy) ITA	Morfeo	3	0	0+2	0	1	0	0	0
31	FW	(Italy) ITA	Taddei	1	0	0+1	0	0	0	0	0
25	DF	(Italy) ITA	Ficagna	0	0	0	0	0	0	0	0
38	MF	(Italy) ITA	Francesco Sorbino	1	0	0	0	1	0	0	0
39	DF	(Italy) ITA	Niccolò Guzzo	1	0	0	0	1	0	0	0
12	GK	(Italy) ITA	Mareggini	0	0	0	0	0	0	0	0
17	MF	(Italy) ITA	Palombo	0	0	0	0	0	0	0	0
37	FW	(Greece) GRE	Vakouftsis	0	0	0	0	0	0	0	0

- Source: http://calcio-seriea.net/allenatori_squadra/2000/1187/

=== Goalscorers ===
- (Italy) Enrico Chiesa 22 (3)
- (Portugal) Nuno Gomes 9
- (Portugal) Rui Costa 6
- (Brazil) Leandro 5 (1)
