= 2001 Coppa Italia final =

2001 Coppa Italia Final
53rd Coppa Italia Final
- Event: 2000–01 Coppa Italia
Parma	Fiorentina
1	2

First leg
Parma	Fiorentina
0	1
- Date: 24 May 2001
- Venue: Stadio Ennio Tardini, Parma
- Referee: Gennaro Borriello
- Attendance: 17,685

Second leg
Fiorentina	Parma
1	1
- Date: 13 June 2001
- Venue: Stadio Artemio Franchi, Florence
- Referee: Massimo De Santis
- Attendance: 37,664

The 2001 Coppa Italia Final was the final of the 2000–01 Coppa Italia, the top cup competition in Italian football. The match was played over two legs on 24 May and 13 June 2001 between Parma and Fiorentina. This was Parma's fourth Coppa Italia final and Fiorentina's tenth. Parma had previously won the trophy twice and Fiorentina had done so on five occasions. The final was won by Fiorentina, who claimed their sixth Coppa Italia title with a 2–1 aggregate victory.

== First leg ==
=== Summary ===
The first leg was at Parma's home, the Stadio Ennio Tardini. It remained level for the vast majority of the 90 minutes, but it was ex-Tardini regular Paolo Vanoli who got the only goal of the game for Fiorentina with just minutes left on the clock. Two years earlier, the left-back had scored for Parma to help them to victory in the 1999 UEFA Cup Final.

=== Details ===
24 May 2001
21:00

Parma	0–1	Fiorentina
		Vanoli 87'

Stadio Ennio Tardini, Parma
Attendance: 17,685
Referee: Gennaro Borriello

Parma	Fiorentina

GK	12	(Italy) Matteo Guardalben
RB	6	(Argentina) Roberto Sensini
CB	17	(Italy) Fabio Cannavaro
CB	21	(France) Lilian Thuram (c)
LB	16	(Brazil) Júnior
MF	2	(Italy) Luigi Sartor		(substituted off) 72'
MF	25	(Argentina) Matías Almeyda
MF	8	(France) Sabri Lamouchi
MF	18	(France) Johan Micoud
FW	9	(Federal Republic of Yugoslavia) Savo Milošević		(substituted off) 81'
FW	20	(Italy) Marco Di Vaio		(substituted off) 62'
Substitutes:
GK	22	(Italy) Davide Micillo
MF	3	(Italy) Antonio Benarrivo
MF	19	(Italy) Stefano Torrisi
MF	4	(Ghana) Stephen Appiah
FW	10	(Brazil) Amoroso	Booked	(substituted in) 62'
FW	70	(Cameroon) Patrick Mboma		(substituted in) 81'
MF	7	(Portugal) Sérgio Conceição		(substituted in) 72'
Manager:
(Italy) Renzo Ulivieri

GK	1	(Italy) Francesco Toldo	Booked
RB	14	(Italy) Paolo Vanoli
CB	2	(Czech Republic) Tomáš Řepka
CB	4	(Italy) Daniele Adani
LB	35	(Italy) Emiliano Moretti
MF	23	(Italy) Alessandro Pierini
MF	15	(Brazil) Amaral
MF	7	(Italy) Angelo Di Livio
MF	10	(Portugal) Rui Costa (c)
FW	19	(Italy) Marco Rossi		(substituted off) 71'
FW	20	(Italy) Enrico Chiesa
Substitutes:
GK	33	(Italy) Giuseppe Taglialatela
MF		(Italy) Giovanni Bartolucci
MF	18	(Italy) Sandro Cois
MF	30	(Italy) Mauro Bressan		(substituted in) 71'
FW	9	(Brazil) Leandro Amaral
MF	21	(Portugal) Nuno Gomes
FW	8	(Federal Republic of Yugoslavia) Predrag Mijatović
Manager:
(Italy) Roberto Mancini

== Second leg ==
=== Summary ===
The second leg was back in Florence, where Fiorentina would be favourites to win and even stronger favourites to take the trophy because only a Parma win could deny them victory. A first-half Savo Milošević strike made the Viola nervous, but Nuno Gomes hit back for the home side half-way through the second half to put Fiorentina back in control of the tie and his side duly saw the game out and lifted the trophy.

=== Details ===
13 June 2001
21:00

Fiorentina	1–1	Parma
Nuno Gomes 65'		Milošević 18'

Stadio Artemio Franchi, Florence
Attendance: 37,664
Referee: Massimo De Santis

Fiorentina	Parma

GK	1	(Italy) Francesco Toldo
RB	2	(Czech Republic) Tomáš Řepka
CB	4	(Italy) Daniele Adani
CB	23	(Italy) Alessandro Pierini	Booked
LB	35	(Italy) Emiliano Moretti		(substituted off) 46'
MF	15	(Brazil) Amaral
MF	14	(Italy) Paolo Vanoli		(substituted off) 76'
MF	7	(Italy) Angelo Di Livio	Booked
MF	19	(Italy) Marco Rossi
MF	10	(Portugal) Rui Costa (c)
FW	20	(Italy) Enrico Chiesa		(substituted off) 89'
Substitutes:
GK	33	(Italy) Giuseppe Taglialatela
DF		(Ivory Coast) Saliou Lassissi
MF	11	(Italy) Fabio Rossitto		(substituted in) 89'
MF	30	(Italy) Mauro Bressan		(substituted in) 76'
MF	24	(Italy) Christian Amoroso
MF	21	(Portugal) Nuno Gomes		(substituted in) 46'
FW	8	(Federal Republic of Yugoslavia) Predrag Mijatović
Manager:
(Italy) Roberto Mancini

GK	12	(Italy) Matteo Guardalben
CB	6	(Argentina) Roberto Sensini
CB	17	(Italy) Fabio Cannavaro	Booked
CB	21	(France) Lilian Thuram (c)	Booked
LWB	16	(Brazil) Júnior
RWB	2	(Italy) Luigi Sartor		(substituted off) 76'
MF	25	(Argentina) Matías Almeyda	Booked	(substituted off) 82'
MF	8	(France) Sabri Lamouchi	Booked
MF	18	(France) Johan Micoud		(substituted off) 85'
FW	9	(Federal Republic of Yugoslavia) Savo Milošević
FW	20	(Italy) Marco Di Vaio
Substitutes:
GK	22	(Italy) Davide Micillo
DF	3	(Italy) Antonio Benarrivo
DF	28	(Italy) Paolo Cannavaro
MF	4	(Ghana) Stephen Appiah		(substituted in) 82'
FW	70	(Cameroon) Patrick Mboma		(substituted in) 85'
MF	33	(Italy) Gianluca Falsini
MF	7	(Italy) Diego Fuser		(substituted in) 76'
Manager:
(Italy) Renzo Ulivieri

== See also ==
- 2000–01 AC Fiorentina season
- 2000–01 Parma AC season
- 1999 Coppa Italia final - played between same teams
