= George Feeney (footballer) =

Northern Ireland footballer (born 2008)

Personal information
- Full name: George James Feeney
- Date of birth: 19 January 2008 (age 18)
- Place of birth: Newport, Wales
- Position: Striker

Team information
- Current team: Tottenham Hotspur

Youth career
- –2023: Glentoran
- 2024–: Tottenham Hotspur

Senior career*
Years	Team	Apps	(Gls)
2023–2024	Glentoran	9	(0)

International career^{‡}
2023	Northern Ireland U16	4	(3)
2023–	Northern Ireland U17	5	(0)
2024	Wales U16	1	(0)
- * Club domestic league appearances and goals as of 19 April 2024, 00:15 (UTC) ‡ National team caps and goals as of 26 March 2024

George James Feeney (born 19 January 2008) is a Northern Irish footballer who plays as a striker at Premier League club Tottenham Hotspur's academy. He has played youth international football for Wales and Northern Ireland.

== Early life ==
Born in Wales, he attended Ashfield Boys' High School in Belfast. Aged 14 years-old, he scored the fastest goal in the history of the SuperCupNI when he scored after 15 seconds of a Glentoran youth team win over Ballymena United youth.

== Club career ==
=== Glentoran ===
Feeney made his senior debut for Glentoran in September 2023 in the County Antrim Shield against Crusaders. He made his NIFL Premiership debut on 9 September 2023, against Newry City in a 4-2 away win. He scored his first senior goal in the Northern Ireland Football League Cup against Dollingstown at The Oval in October 2023, becoming the club's youngest-ever goalscorer.

In November 2023, he was linked to a move to England with four Premier League clubs reported as being interested.

=== Tottenham Hotspur ===
On 4 July 2024, English Premier League club Tottenham Hotspur announced the signing of Feeney in an undisclosed deal. He signed his first professional contract with Tottenham on 21 January 2025.

== International career ==
Feeney was born in Wales, like his paternal grandfather, while his father was born in Northern Ireland. He scored his first goal for Northern Ireland U16 against Wales U16 in November 2023. That year he was also called up to the Northern Ireland U17 side. In 2024, he switched his allegiance to Wales and played for the U16 side in a friendly against the Czech Republic U16 on 26 March. In October 2024, Feeney committed to play for Northern Ireland in the future and was recalled to the under 17s.

== Personal life ==
He is the son of former Northern Ireland international Warren Feeney. Warren Feeney was the manager at Glentoran when George made his debut, and Warren described himself as his son's "harshest critic" and had to be persuaded by his assistant-manager John Gregg to give George Feeney his first team debut, who told him he "deserved it" due to his goalscoring form for the reserves. His great grandfather Jim and grandfather Warren Feeney Sr. also represented Northern Ireland at international football.
