= Mauro Bressan =

Italian footballer

Personal information
- Full name: Mauro Bressan
- Date of birth: 5 January 1971 (age 55)
- Place of birth: Valdobbiadene, Italy
- Height: 1.77 m (5 ft 10 in)
- Position: Midfielder

Youth career
- 1988–1989: Montebelluna

Senior career*
Years	Team	Apps	(Gls)
1989–1991	Milan	0	(0)
1991	Perugia	0	(0)
1991–1994	Como	58	(6)
1994–1995	Foggia	32	(1)
1995–1997	Cagliari	41	(0)
1997–1999	Bari	57	(1)
1999–2001	Fiorentina	59	(2)
2001–2002	Venezia	29	(0)
2002–2003	Genoa	30	(1)
2003–2005	Como	50	(1)
2005–2007	Lugano	59	(2)
2007–2008	Chiasso	53	(1)
Total		468	(15)
- * Club domestic league appearances and goals

Mauro Bressan (born 5 January 1971) is a retired Italian footballer who played as a midfielder.

== Career ==
Bressan began his career with AC Milan in 1989, but didn't play any games. In 1991 he transferred to Como of Serie C1.

He moved to Foggia Calcio in 1994, and played the 1994–95 Serie A with the club. He scored once that season, in a match against Cagliari in November 1994. Foggia were relegated that season.

Bressan played for Cagliari from 1995 until their relegation to Serie B in 1997. After that he was signed by Bari for two years, making 57 league appearances and scoring one goal in a 4–3 loss against Bologna in February 1998.

His career peaked whilst playing for Fiorentina between 1999 and 2001; although he was not given many league starts, he did start in three Champions League games for the Italian side. Bressan's main fame comes from one of these games, in the 3–3 group stage draw against Barcelona on 2 November 1999. After 14 minutes he scored what is considered one of the greatest goals of all time, a spectacular 29 yard bicycle kick. An ITV programme on the 50 greatest Champions League goals had it at number 2, behind Zinedine Zidane's title-winning volley against Bayer Leverkusen in the 2002 Champions League Final. Sky One also placed this goal as number 8 in their list of the 50 greatest Champions League goals. In the very same game against Barcelona, Bressan combined well with Abel Balbo, providing a spectacular backheel pass to assist Balbo in scoring Fiorentina's second goal of the game. His only league goal in the 1999–2000 season came during a 0–4 away victory against Inter Milan on the penultimate matchday.

He won the Coppa Italia with Fiorentina during the 2000–01 season, making 8 appearances and scoring two goals during the tournament; one in the quarter-finals against Brescia in November 2000, and one in the semi-finals against AC Milan in January 2001. He also assisted Paolo Vanoli's goal in the first leg of the final.

Bressan played the following season, the 2001–02 Serie A season, with Venezia. Bressan played for Genoa in the 2002–03 season, where he made 30 league appearances and scored once in a 2–2 draw against Hellas Verona.

After that he returned to Como for two years, leaving in 2005 for FC Lugano of the Swiss Challenge League. He scored his first goal for Lugano on 11 March 2006 in a 1–1 draw against FC Baden. His second goal came in the 2006–07 league season, a 2–1 victory against FC Vaduz in April 2007.

He transferred to FC Chiasso in 2007. He scored his only goal with the club in a 2–3 victory against Concordia Basel on 11 April 2008. At the end of the 2007–08 season, he retired.

Bressan worked as the sporting director for Hungarian club Vasas SC of the NB1 during the 2009–10 season.

== Match fixing allegations ==
In June 2011 Bressan was arrested alongside fifteen other people (including former players Giuseppe Signori and Stefano Bettarini) for alleged match fixing, following the outbreak of the 2011–12 Italian football scandal. In August 2012, the FIGC banned Bressan from all football-related activities for three and a half years.

== Honours ==
Fiorentina

- Coppa Italia: 2000–01
