= Star Sixes =

Star Sixes is a competitive six-a-side indoor football competition where former international association football players are chosen to represent a senior national team for which they played. The inaugural event took place in July 2017 in London, at The O2 Arena. Further regionalised events were set for late-2017 in Asia. A 2019 edition was confirmed in October 2018.

== Format ==
For the inaugural edition, all teams participating had a squad of ten players, with six being on the field of play including a captain. Squads were chosen by the team captain and the tournament organisers. There were three groups of four. In the groups, each team played each other team once and the top two from each group, plus two best third-placed teams, progressed to the quarter-finals, before facing off for a place in the semi-final and subsequent final. Six group matches (two from each group) took place on day one, before the same amount on days two and three. The quarter-finals were held on day three with the semi-finals, third place play-off and final following on the last day of competition. There was no extra time or penalties in the group stage but a penalty shoot-out could have been played if a knockout fixture ended tied. Group matches lasted for 20 minutes, while knockout fixtures lasted for 30 minutes, with short half-time breaks.

== 2017 edition ==
2017 Star Sixes Betsafe
Tournament details
- Host country: England
- Dates: 13–16 July
- Teams: 12
- Venue(s): 1 (in 1 host city)

Final positions
- Champions: France (1st title)
- Runners-up: Denmark
- Third place: Spain
- Fourth place: Brazil

Tournament statistics
- Matches played: 26
- Goals scored: 135 (5.19 per match)
- Top scorer(s): (Spain) Míchel Salgado
- Best player(s): (Denmark) Chris Sørensen

Before the launch, Steven Gerrard, Michael Owen, Robert Pires, Michael Ballack, Deco, Carles Puyol, Roberto Carlos and Jay-Jay Okocha were announced as player participants while Australia, Brazil, China, England, France, Germany, Italy, Mexico, Netherlands, Nigeria, Portugal and Spain were announced as nation participants. The 2017 edition was officially launched at The O2 Arena on 24 January 2017, during which more players were announced, namely Jens Lehmann, David James, Emile Heskey, Rio Ferdinand, Dominic Matteo and Gaizka Mendieta. Australia and Netherlands were replaced with Denmark and Scotland, but no reason was given.

The group stage draw, conducted by captains Ballack and Pires, took place on 24 March, it was broadcast live in the United Kingdom on Sky Sports News HQ.

=== Players ===
Gerrard, Pires, Ballack, Okocha, Deco, Matteo and Puyol were captains of their respective teams. Don Hutchison, Olivier Dacourt, Míchel Salgado, Martin Jørgensen, Stig Tøfting, William Gallas and Eric Abidal were later announced. Five players were added to Scotland's squad on 10 March, including Paul Dickov and Barry Ferguson. Marcel Desailly was one of three players added to France's squad on 15 March. Juliano Belletti was added for Brazil five days later. Spain added four players on 24 March, and the full Mexico squad was announced on 28 March. Gilberto Silva (Brazil) and Christian Abbiati (Italy) were announced on 31 March.

Maniche, Vítor Baía and Fernando Couto joined Portugal's squad on 12 April. Germany added three players days later. John Sivebæk and Daniel Jensen were added to Denmark's squad on 19 April. Scotland completed their squad on 21 April with the additions of Jackie McNamara, Mark Burchill and Neil McCann. Celestine Babayaro joined Nigeria's squad on 5 May. Five more players were announced in May, while Betsafe became the naming rights holders. On 26 May, Daniel Amokachi, Julius Aghahowa and Garba Lawal joined Nigeria. José Bosingwa joined Portugal on 7 June. Rivaldo was one of three players added for Brazil on 9 June, he was also named captain for Brazil. Fabrizio Ravanelli joined Italy on 15 June.

Dietmar Hamann joined Germany on 16 June, prior to Nuno Gomes, Raul Meireles, Kevin Kurányi, Mads Junker, Mikkel Beckmann, Chris Sørensen, Hjalte Nørregaard and Per Krøldrup all signing up on 23 June. Juninho, Djalminha, Danny Murphy, Paul Merson, Carlos Marchena and Lee Hendrie joined during the following week. Italy added six on 29 June, including Paolo Di Canio, but also lost two as Christian Abbiati and Simone Perrotta (injured) left the competition. Also on 29 June, three players joined Nigeria. On 30 June, Portugal completed their squad while China's entire team was announced. Youri Djorkaeff also joined France. Twelve new faces joined on 6 July, including two replacements; Richard Hughes replaced Neil McCann (who pulled out following his appointment as Dundee manager) while Erubey Cabuto took the place of the injured Jorge Campos. The squad lists were completed on 11 July with France, Germany and Spain adding players; Germany added three including Timo Hildebrand who replaces Lehmann; this means Germany have eleven players, it is presumed that one of their players will withdraw - that player was later confirmed as David Odonkor. German-born former Northern Irish international Maik Taylor was announced as the competition's back-up goalkeeper. Ferdinand withdrew from the competition on 13 July following the death of his mother. He was replaced by Luke Young.

Nation	Player 1	Player 2	Player 3	Player 4	Player 5	Player 6	Player 7	Player 8	Player 9	Player 10
Brazil	Rivaldo (C)	Roberto Carlos	Juliano Belletti	Gilberto Silva	Elano	Dida	Juninho	Djalminha	Júlio Baptista	Amaral
China	Peng Weiguo	Peng Weijun	Yao Xia	Fu Bin	Liang Jianfeng	Jiang Feng	Wei Qun	Liu Cheng	Chen Yongqiang	Hu Zhijun
Denmark	Stig Tøfting (C)	Martin Jørgensen	John Sivebæk	Daniel Jensen	Mads Junker	Mikkel Beckmann	Chris Sørensen	Hjalte Nørregaard	Per Krøldrup	Jan Hoffmann
England	Steven Gerrard (C)	Michael Owen	David James	Emile Heskey	Phil Neville	Danny Murphy	Paul Merson	Lee Hendrie	Wes Brown	Luke Young
France	Robert Pires (C)	Olivier Dacourt	William Gallas	Eric Abidal	Ludovic Giuly	Sébastien Frey	Marcel Desailly	Youri Djorkaeff	Bruno Cheyrou	Vincent Candela
Germany	Michael Ballack (C)	Marco Reich	Simon Rolfes	Dietmar Hamann	Kevin Kurányi	Jörg Albertz	Jens Nowotny	Timo Hildebrand	Maurizio Gaudino	Dariusz Wosz
Italy	Alessandro Del Piero (C)	Simone Barone	Fabrizio Ravanelli	Paolo Di Canio	Angelo Di Livio	Stefano Fiore	Marco Delvecchio	Marco Amelia	Massimo Oddo	Luciano Zauri
Mexico	Jared Borgetti (C)	Luis Hernández	Alberto García Aspe	Joaquín Reyes	Braulio Luna	Mario Méndez	Miguel Zepeda	Alberto Rodríguez	Héctor Altamirano	Erubey Cabuto
Nigeria	Jay-Jay Okocha (C)	Celestine Babayaro	Daniel Amokachi	Julius Aghahowa	Garba Lawal	Joseph Yobo	Taribo West	Victor Ikpeba	Peter Rufai	Uche Okechukwu
Portugal	Deco (C)	Maniche	Vítor Baía	Fernando Couto	José Bosingwa	Nuno Gomes	Raul Meireles	Paulo Ferreira	Hélder Postiga	Luís Boa Morte
Scotland	Dominic Matteo (C)	Don Hutchison	Robert Douglas	Christian Dailly	Simon Donnelly	Paul Dickov	Barry Ferguson	Jackie McNamara	Mark Burchill	Richard Hughes
Spain	Carles Puyol (C)	Gaizka Mendieta	Míchel Salgado	Luis García	David Albelda	Pedro Contreras	Alfonso Pérez	Fernando Morientes	Carlos Marchena	Joan Capdevila

Maik Taylor was a reserve goalkeeper for all nations. Colin Hendry was a replacement for Scotland.

=== Group standings ===
Group A

Pos	Team	Pld	W	D	L	GF	GA	GD	Pts	Qualification
1	Spain	3	3	0	0	12	2	+10	9	Advance to knockout stage
2	England	3	2	0	1	6	6	0	6	Advance to knockout stage
3	Scotland	3	1	0	2	4	10	−6	3	Knockout stage or elimination
4	Mexico	3	0	0	3	3	7	−4	0	

Updated to match(es) played on unknown. Source: Star Sixes
13 July 2017
19:30 BST

England	1-4	Spain
Owen 2'	Report	4', 11' García; 14' Pérez; 18' Capdevila

The O2 Arena, London
13 July 2017
20:00 BST

Mexico	1-3	Scotland
Hernández 17'	Report	2' Donnelly; 5' Ferguson; 14' Burchill

The O2 Arena, London

14 July 2017
21:45 BST

Spain	2-1	Mexico
Morientes 18'; Salgado 20'	Report	9' Borgetti

The O2 Arena, London
14 July 2017
22:15 BST

Scotland	1-3	England
Burchill 15'	Report	7', 8' Owen; 20' Gerrard

The O2 Arena, London

15 July 2017
14:00 BST

Spain	6-0	Scotland
Salgado 3', 4'; Mendieta 9'; Marchena 13'; García 19'; Pérez 20'

The O2 Arena, London
15 July 2017
14:45 BST

England	2-1	Mexico
Hendrie 8'; Murphy 15'		14' Luna

The O2 Arena, London

Group B

Pos	Team	Pld	W	D	L	GF	GA	GD	Pts	Qualification
1	Brazil	3	3	0	0	12	1	+11	9	Advance to knockout stage
2	Italy	3	2	0	1	7	5	+2	6	Advance to knockout stage
3	Nigeria	3	1	0	2	4	7	−3	3	Knockout stage or elimination
4	China	3	0	0	3	4	14	−10	0	

Updated to match(es) played on unknown. Source: Star Sixes
13 July 2017
21:45 BST

Nigeria	3-2	China PR
Yakubu 6', 6'; Amokachi 18'	Report	18' Peng Weiguo; 19' Liang Jianfeng

The O2 Arena, London
13 July 2017
22:15 BST

Brazil	2-1	Italy
Juninho 3'; Belletti 7'	Report	7' Delvecchio

The O2 Arena, London

14 July 2017
20:30 BST

China PR	0-7	Brazil
	Report	3', 7', 18' Júlio Baptista; 15' Djalminha; 19' Elano; 20' Rivaldo; 20' Juninho

The O2 Arena, London
14 July 2017
21:15 BST

Italy	2-1	Nigeria
Del Piero 1'; Fiore 9'	Report	11' Yakubu

The O2 Arena, London

15 July 2017
13:00 BST

Brazil	3-0	Nigeria
Júlio Baptista 7'; Elano 14'; Juninho 16'

The O2 Arena, London
15 July 2017
13:30 BST

Italy	4-2	China PR
Del Piero 2'; Di Canio 8'; Zauri 11', 20'		9' Jiang Feng; 19' (o.g.) Zauri

The O2 Arena, London

Group C

Pos	Team	Pld	W	D	L	GF	GA	GD	Pts	Qualification
1	Denmark	3	1	2	0	9	7	+2	5	Advance to knockout stage
2	France	3	1	1	1	7	7	0	4	Advance to knockout stage
3	Germany	3	1	1	1	6	7	−1	4	Knockout stage or elimination
4	Portugal	3	1	0	2	8	9	−1	3	

Updated to match(es) played on unknown. Source: Star Sixes
13 July 2017
20:30 BST

Portugal	4-6	Denmark
Postiga 2', 4', 11'; Maniche 17'	Report	2' Jensen; 3', 9', 17' Junker; 4' Sørensen; 12' Jørgensen

The O2 Arena, London
13 July 2017
21:15 BST

Germany	4-3	France
Kurányi 1', 13'; Ballack 5'; Gaudino 14'	Report	Nowotny 1' (o.g.); Candela 6'; Giuly 7'

The O2 Arena, London

14 July 2017
19:30 BST

France	3-2	Portugal
Pires 1'; Giuly 8'; Abidal 9'	Report	Deco 9'; Postiga 11'

The O2 Arena, London
14 July 2017
20:00 BST

Denmark	2-2	Germany
Jørgensen 10'; Sørensen 12'	Report	13', 14' Wosz

The O2 Arena, London

15 July 2017
15:15 BST

France	1-1	Denmark
Cheyrou 15'		2' Sørensen

The O2 Arena, London
15 July 2017
15:45 BST

Germany	0-2	Portugal
		1' Maniche; 17' Nuno Gomes

The O2 Arena, London

=== Knockout phase ===
Knockout stage

Quarter-finals
15 July — London
Spain	8
Nigeria	1
15 July — London
Italy	2
France	4
15 July — London
Brazil	3
Germany	1
15 July — London
Denmark	3
England	1

Semi-finals
16 July — London
Spain	2
France	5
16 July — London
Brazil	2
Denmark	4

Final
16 July — London
France	2
Denmark	1
Third place
16 July — London
Spain	11
Brazil	3

Quarter-finals

15 July 2017
19:30 BST

Spain	8-1	Nigeria
García 2'; Salgado 2', 13', 20'; Pérez 5'; Marchena 25'; Mendieta 28'; Capdevila 30'		14' Yakubu

The O2 Arena, London
15 July 2017
20:15 BST

Brazil	3-1	Germany
Júlio Baptista 13'; Gilberto Silva 16'; Amaral 25'		17' Reich

The O2 Arena, London
15 July 2017
21:05 BST

Denmark	3-1	England
Sørensen 2'; Jensen 7', 12'		10' Gerrard

The O2 Arena, London
15 July 2017
21:50 BST

Italy	2-4	France
Di Canio 2'; Fiore 9'		3', 4' Pires; 8' Cheyrou; 15' (o.g.) Zauri

The O2 Arena, London

Semi-finals

16 July 2017
19:00 BST

Spain	2-5	France
Mendieta 26'; García 27'		6', 6', 29' Giuly; 9' Candela; 10' Djorkaeff

The O2 Arena, London
16 July 2017
19:45 BST

Brazil	2-4	Denmark
Elano 12', 22'		2', 6' Jørgensen; 5' Nørregaard; 29' Junker

The O2 Arena, London

Third place play-off

16 July 2017
20:35 BST

Spain	11-3	Brazil
Salgado 1', 17', 21'; Morientes 9', 18', 30', 30'; García 12'; Capdevila 13', 20'; Marchena 24'		7' Amaral; 21' Júlio Baptista; 29' Djalminha

The O2 Arena, London

Final

16 July 2017
21:20 BST

France	2-1	Denmark
Giuly 3'; Djorkaeff 22'		8' Jensen

The O2 Arena, London

=== Top goalscorers ===
9 goals

- (Spain) Míchel Salgado

6 goals

- (Brazil) Júlio Baptista
- (Spain) Luis García

5 goals

- (France) Ludovic Giuly
- (Spain) Fernando Morientes

4 goals

- (Denmark) Chris Sørensen
- (Nigeria) Yakubu

== 2019 edition ==
2019 FansBet Star Sixes
Tournament details
- Host country: Scotland
- Dates: 4–6 January
- Teams: 6
- Venue(s): 1 (in 1 host city)

Final positions
- Champions: England
- Runners-up: Rest of The World

The competition's second edition was announced in October 2018, with the SSE Hydro in Glasgow, Scotland hosting. It will feature past participants England and Scotland, along with Northern Ireland, the Republic of Ireland, Wales and a Rest of the World XI. The schedule was revealed on 23 October, with the Rest of the World facing Northern Ireland in the opening fixture.

=== Players ===
Michael Owen and Robert Pires were the first players announced. Barry Ferguson returned to play for hosts Scotland, captaining the side in place of Dominic Matteo. Simon Donnelly, Keith Gillespie and Paddy McCourt were revealed as players in October 2018. Stiliyan Petrov and Jason McAteer were two of seven new faces announced on 18 October, on the same day as FansBet were announced as title sponsors. David James and Emile Heskey's return for England was confirmed on 25 October, with Wayne Bridge joining a day later. Maik Taylor, Stephen Craigan, Steven Reid, Gaizka Mendieta and Luke Young were added to their respective teams towards the end of October. Jay-Jay Okocha agreed to return on 1 November. Tony Capaldi and Colin Murdock joined Northern Ireland on 2 November, while Scotland announced three signings on 5 November. Vítor Baía and Ronald de Boer joined the ROTW later that day. Republic of Ireland's John Aldridge signed on 7 November, along with Wes Brown (England) and Pierre van Hooijdonk (Rest of the World) days later.

Joe Cole joined England on 15 November, days after he announced his retirement from professional football. Scotland's Lee McCulloch was announced on 16 November. Star Sixes revealed Martin Jørgensen and Ryan Giggs as players at the end of November, with Craig Bellamy, Darren Bent and Charlie Miller subsequently being announced. Dean Shiels was added to Northern Ireland's squad in December, along with David Dunn (England) and Owen Coyle (Rep. of Ireland). Ryan Giggs withdrew due to injury on 30 December. Before Giggs' departure, the rest of the tournament's players were revealed two days prior. Andy Legg and Simon Church were revealed on the opening day, replacing Giggs and Craig Bellamy; whose withdrawal coincided with his temporary departure as academy coach of Cardiff City after claims of bullying. Warren Feeney replaced Capaldi, Stephen Hunt replaced Reid and Niall Quinn replaced Aldridge.

Nation	Player 1	Player 2	Player 3	Player 4	Player 5	Player 6	Player 7	Player 8	Player 9	Player 10
England	Michael Owen (C)	David James	Emile Heskey	Wayne Bridge	Luke Young	Wes Brown	Joe Cole	Darren Bent	David Dunn	Paul Konchesky
Northern Ireland	Maik Taylor (C)	Keith Gillespie	Paddy McCourt	Steve Jones	Stephen Craigan	Colin Murdock	Dean Shiels	Andy Kirk	Michael Hughes	Warren Feeney
Republic of Ireland	Jason McAteer (C)	Owen Coyle	Tim Dittmer	Ian Harte	Phil Babb	Richie Partridge	Lee Carsley	Liam Lawrence	Stephen Hunt	Niall Quinn
Rest of the World	(France) Robert Pires (C)	(Germany) Jörg Albertz	(Italy) Marco Negri	(Bulgaria) Stiliyan Petrov	(Spain) Gaizka Mendieta	(Nigeria) Jay-Jay Okocha	(Portugal) Vítor Baía	(Netherlands) Ronald de Boer	(Netherlands) Pierre van Hooijdonk	(Denmark) Martin Jørgensen
Scotland	Barry Ferguson (C)	Simon Donnelly	Jackie McNamara	Rab Douglas	Don Hutchison	Mark Burchill	James McFadden	Lee McCulloch	Charlie Miller	Stephen McManus
Wales	Danny Gabbidon (C)	Paul Jones	Dean Saunders	Robert Earnshaw	Jermaine Easter	Owain Tudur Jones	David Cotterill	Jack Collison	Andy Legg	Simon Church

Dominic Matteo was announced as Scotland's manager.

=== Group standings ===
Pos	Team	Pld	W	D	L	GF	GA	GD	Pts	Qualification
1	Rest of the World	5	3	2	0	15	5	+10	11	Advance to Final
2	England	5	3	1	1	14	8	+6	10	Advance to Final
3	Scotland	5	3	1	1	9	5	+4	10	
4	Republic of Ireland	5	1	1	3	8	11	−3	4	
5	Northern Ireland	5	1	1	3	10	17	−7	4	
6	Wales	5	1	0	4	10	20	−10	3	

Updated to match(es) played on unknown. Source: Star Sixes
4 January 2019
19:00 BST

Rest of the World	5-0	Northern Ireland

SSE Hydro, Glasgow
4 January 2019
19:33 BST

Wales	1-6	England

SSE Hydro, Glasgow
4 January 2019
20:06 BST

Scotland	2-0	Republic of Ireland

SSE Hydro, Glasgow

4 January 2019
20:50 BST

Rest of the World	1-1	England

SSE Hydro, Glasgow
4 January 2019
21:23 BST

Republic of Ireland	4-3	Wales

SSE Hydro, Glasgow
4 January 2019
22:00 BST

Northern Ireland	4-1	Scotland

SSE Hydro, Glasgow

5 January 2019
15:00 BST

Rest of the World	2-1	Republic of Ireland

SSE Hydro, Glasgow
5 January 2019
15:33 BST

Wales	0-2	Scotland

SSE Hydro, Glasgow
5 January 2019
16:06 BST

England	5-2	Northern Ireland

SSE Hydro, Glasgow

5 January 2019
16:50 BST

Rest of the World	7-3	Wales

SSE Hydro, Glasgow
5 January 2019
17:23 BST

Republic of Ireland	3-3	Northern Ireland

SSE Hydro, Glasgow
5 January 2019
18:00 BST

England	1-4	Scotland

SSE Hydro, Glasgow

6 January 2019
17:00 BST

Wales	3-1	Northern Ireland

SSE Hydro, Glasgow
6 January 2019
17:33 BST

Scotland	0-0	Rest of the World

SSE Hydro, Glasgow
6 January 2019
18:06 BST

England	1-0	Republic of Ireland

SSE Hydro, Glasgow

=== Knockout phase ===
Fifth place play-off

6 January 2018
18:50 BST

Northern Ireland	1-1	Wales

SSE Hydro, Glasgow

Third place play-off

6 January 2018
19:23 BST

Scotland	1-1	Republic of Ireland

SSE Hydro, Glasgow

Final

6 January 2018
20:00 BST

Rest of the World	2-3	England

SSE Hydro, Glasgow

== Media coverage ==
2017

Market	Broadcast partner	Ref
United Kingdom; Republic of Ireland	Sky Sports (English)	
Italy	Fox Sports Italy (Italian)	
France	beIN Sports (French)	
Portugal	Sport TV (Portuguese)	
Denmark	TV3 Sport (Danish)	
Bosnia and Herzegovina; Croatia; Macedonia; Montenegro; Serbia	Arena Sport (Croatian/Serbian)	
Costa Rica; Dominican Republic; El Salvador; Guatemala; Honduras; Mexico; Nicaragua; Panama	Sky México (Spanish)	
Brazil	SporTV (Brazilian Portuguese)	
Israel	Charlton Broadcasting Company (Hebrew)	
Algeria; Bahrain; Chad; Djibouti; Egypt; Iran; Iraq; Jordan; Kuwait; Lebanon; Libya; Mauritania; Morocco; Oman; Palestine; Qatar; Saudi Arabia; Somalia; South Sudan; Sudan; Syria; Tunisia; United Arab Emirates; Yemen	beIN Sports (Arabic)	

2019

Market	Broadcast partner	Ref
United Kingdom (host)	Sky Sports (English)	
Republic of Ireland	Sky Sports (English)	
Denmark	TV3 Sport	
Finland	Viasport	
Norway	Viasport	
Sweden	Viasport	
