= Amaral (footballer, born 1973) =

Brazilian footballer

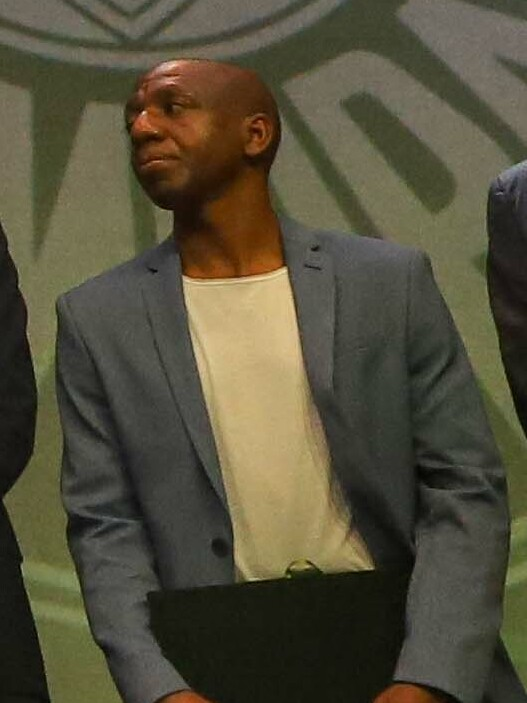
- Amaral in 2018

Personal information
- Full name: Alexandre da Silva Mariano
- Date of birth: 28 February 1973 (age 53)
- Place of birth: Capivari, Brazil
- Height: 1.70 m (5 ft 7 in)
- Position: Defensive midfielder

Youth career
- Palmeiras

Senior career*
Years	Team	Apps	(Gls)
1992–1996	Palmeiras	60	(1)
1996–1997	Parma	4	(0)
1996–1997	→ Benfica (loan)	19	(0)
1997	→ Palmeiras (loan)	22	(0)
1997–2000	Benfica	5	(0)
1998–1999	→ Corinthians (loan)	18	(0)
1999–2000	→ Vasco da Gama (loan)	71	(1)
2000–2002	Fiorentina	33	(0)
2002–2003	Beşiktaş	11	(0)
2003	Grêmio	14	(0)
2004	Al-Ittihad	8	(0)
2004	Vitória	9	(0)
2005	Atlético Mineiro	8	(0)
2006–2007	Pogoń Szczecin	16	(1)
2007–2008	Santa Cruz	0	(0)
2008	Grêmio Barueri	0	(0)
2008–2009	Perth Glory	9	(0)
2010	Grêmio Catanduvense	6	(0)
2010–2011	Manado United	18	(3)
2011–2012	Persebaya Surabaya	25	(5)
2013	Poços de Caldas	0	(0)
2013	Itumbiara	1	(0)
2015	Capivariano	0	(0)
Total		272	(3)

International career
1995–1996	Brazil U-23	6	(0)
1995–1996	Brazil	10	(0)
Medal record
Representing Brazil
Men's Football
Bronze medal – third place	1996 Atlanta	Team Competition
- * Club domestic league appearances and goals

Alexandre da Silva Mariano (born 28 February 1973), best known as Amaral, is a Brazilian retired professional footballer who played as a defensive midfielder.

An international for Brazil, he participated in the 1996 Summer Olympics, winning a bronze metal. During his club career, he passed through numerous clubs, winning league titles at Palmeiras, Corinthians, Vasco da Gama and Beşiktaş.

== Club career ==
Born in Capivari, during his youth, and before he turned professional, Amaral worked at a funeral parlor. Developed at Palmeiras, for which he made his debut in 1992. He appeared in 244 matches for Palmeiras, and helped them win the 1993 and 1994 Brasileirão, as well two Campeonato Paulista in the same years. He scored his only goal for Palmeiras in a 5–1 win against Grêmio in the quarter-finals of the 1995 Copa Libertadores.

With his performances, Palmeiras sold him to Parma in 1996. The Italians had Buffon, Hernán Crespo, Dino Baggio and Lilian Thuram, with Amaral struggled to perform, only making four appearances, before being loaned to Benfica in December 1996. He made his debut on a home draw against Marítimo on 22 December 1996, and quickly earned his place in the starting XI, in favour of Bruno Caires and Jamir Gomes. He returned to Palmeiras for the remaining Brazilian league, helping the São Paulo-side finish second.

In December 1997, Amaral moved back to Benfica on a permanent deal, as an election promise from João Vale e Azevedo. However, he appeared only sporadically, as Graeme Souness opted for Kandaurov in 1997–98, and then signed Michael Thomas in the following season. In July 1998, he was loaned to Corinthians for one year. There, he was part of the squad that won two consecutive league titles, in 1998 and 1999, as well another State Championship. A year later, he moved to Vasco da Gama on the same predicament. He continued to bag league titles, winning his fifth title in 2000, as well two other titles, the Torneio Rio – São Paulo and the Copa Mercosur.

On 28 June 2000, Amaral signed with Fiorentina for a fee of 7.35 billion lire (€3.796 million). He reunited with Nuno Gomes, who also signed with the Italians, and during his first season, he help the team win the Coppa Italia. After a complicated second season, which ended in bankruptcy. The 29-year-old moved to Beşiktaş but stayed just six months, being released in January due to the lack of opportunities "I did not have many first-team chances, I could not play as much as I wanted to."

After leaving Turkey, Amaral became a constant journeyman, moving from club to club on a yearly basis. In 2008, he moved to Australia, to play for Perth Glory who scored a major recruiting coup after snaring the services of the Brazilian international midfielder for the 2008/09 Hyundai A-League season. He brought a wealth of experience to the Glory and become a fan favourite, but he was ruled out for the rest of the season after aggravating a hamstring injury. Amaral was released by Perth on 2 May 2009.

In August 2009, he rejoined the Glory after signing a nine-match guest contract. The stint was rather uneventful, with Amaral only having featured for the side a few times off the bench, but despite this Amaral enjoyed his return to Perth and thanked the club for giving him another chance. Already at the age of 40 years, he had brief spells with Poços de Caldas and Itumbiara during 2013, making only one official appearance for Itumbiara.

== International career ==
Amaral made his debut for the Brazil national team on 27 September 1995, in a 2–1 win against Romania. In January 1996, he participated in the 1996 CONCACAF Gold Cup, won by Mexico against Brazil, and six months later played the Summer Olympics alongside Roberto Carlos, Bebeto, Ronaldo and Rivaldo, finishing with the bronze medal. His last game was on 31 August 1996, in a friendly against Netherlands.

== Other works ==
In 2015, Amaral participated as a contestant in the reality television series A Fazenda 8.

In 2022, he performed cosplayed as a dog in the reality singing competition The Masked Singer Brasil.

== Honours ==
Palmeiras

- Serie A: 1993, 1994,
- Campeonato Paulista: 1993, 1994, 1996
- Rio-São Paulo Tournament: 1993
- Copa do Brasil runner-up: 1996
- Copa libertadores 2004

Corinthians

- Serie A: 1998, 1999
- Campeonato Paulista: 1999

Vasco da Gama

- Serie A: 2000
- Rio-São Paulo Tournament: 1999
- Guanabara Cup: 2000
- Mercosul Cup: 2000

Fiorentina

- Coppa Italia: 2000–01

Beşiktaş

- Süper Lig: 2002–03
