= Warren Feeney =

Northern Irish footballer and manager

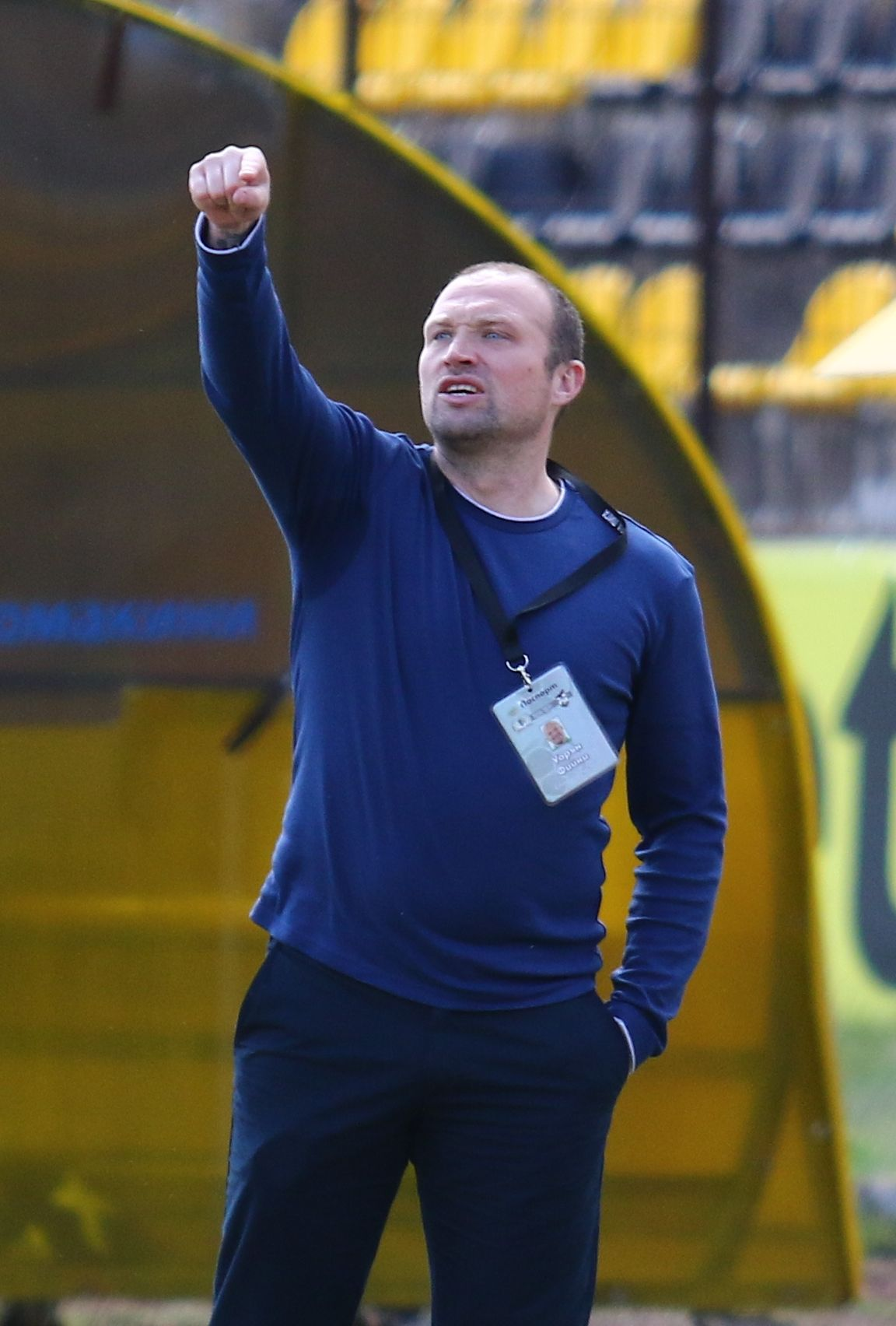
- Feeney managing Pirin in 2021

Personal information
- Full name: Warren James Feeney
- Date of birth: 17 January 1981 (age 45)
- Place of birth: Belfast, Northern ireland
- Height: 5 ft 10 in (1.78 m)
- Position: Forward

Team information
- Current team: Sligo Rovers (assistant manager)

Youth career
- Leeds United

Senior career*
Years	Team	Apps	(Gls)
1998–2001	Leeds United	0	(0)
2001	→ AFC Bournemouth (loan)	10	(4)
2001–2004	AFC Bournemouth	98	(32)
2004–2005	Stockport County	31	(15)
2005–2007	Luton Town	77	(8)
2007	→ Cardiff City (loan)	6	(0)
2007–2010	Cardiff City	14	(0)
2007	→ Swansea City (loan)	10	(5)
2008–2009	→ Dundee United (loan)	23	(6)
2009	→ Sheffield Wednesday (loan)	1	(0)
2010–2011	Oldham Athletic	23	(0)
2011–2013	Plymouth Argyle	49	(5)
2013–2014	Salisbury City	15	(0)
2014–2015	Linfield	8	(1)
2019	Callington Town		
2019	Ards	1	(0)
Total		366	(76)

International career
1994–1995	Northern Ireland U15	4	(0)
1995–1996	Northern Ireland U16	8	(1)
1998–1999	Northern Ireland U18	9	(1)
2001–2003	Northern Ireland U21	8	(2)
2002–2011	Northern Ireland	46	(5)

Managerial career
- 2014–2015: Linfield
- 2015–2016: Newport County (assistant)
- 2016: Newport County
- 2017–2018: Crawley Town (assistant)
- 2018: Notts County (assistant)
- 2019: Ards
- 2019–2021: Pirin Blagoevgrad
- 2022: Northern Ireland U21 (assistant)
- 2022–2023: Welling United
- 2023–2024: Glentoran
- 2024–2025: Weymouth
- 2025–2026: Hanoi (assistant)
- 2026–: Sligo Rovers (assistant)
- * Club domestic league appearances and goals

Warren James Feeney (born 17 January 1981) is a Northern Irish football manager and former professional footballer who is currently an assistant manager at League of Ireland Premier Division club Sligo Rovers.

As a player he was a forward who began his professional career with Leeds United. He played in the Football League for AFC Bournemouth, Stockport County, Luton Town, Cardiff City, Swansea City, Sheffield Wednesday, Oldham Athletic and Plymouth Argyle, in the Scottish Premiership for Dundee United. He also had a spell in his native country for Linfield and played non-league football for both Salisbury City, Callington Town and Ards. He is a Northern Ireland former international and was capped 46 times, scoring 5 goals. In making his debut, he became the third generation of his family to receive an international cap, after his father Warren Feeney, Sr. and grandfather Jim Feeney.

After retiring he moved into management and has had spells in charge of Linfield, Newport County, Ards and in Bulgaria with Pirin Blagoevgrad.

== Playing career ==
=== Early career ===
Feeney attended Ashfield Boys' High School. He started his career when he joined St Andrews, once scoring 54 goals in one season. He signed as a trainee with Leeds United, in 1998, but never made the league side and was loaned out to AFC Bournemouth in 2001.

=== AFC Bournemouth ===
After 10 loan games, the loan to Bournemouth became permanent and he finally played in 108 games for Bournemouth, scoring 36 goals, before leaving at the end of the 2003–04 season. league 2 play off winner 2002

=== Stockport County ===
He joined Stockport County from Bournemouth for a fee of £45,000, making over 30 appearances for them, and scoring 15 goals, but in spite of his contribution the club were relegated at the end of the season.

=== Luton Town ===
Feeney moved on to Luton Town for £150,000. He did not have a great start to his Luton career, scoring only 6 goals in 30 starts and 18 substitute appearances in the 2005–06 season, and although he finally clocked up 77 appearances in all, he only managed a haul of 8 goals in total, and in March 2007, he was allowed to join Cardiff City on loanleague 1 winner 2005

=== Cardiff City ===
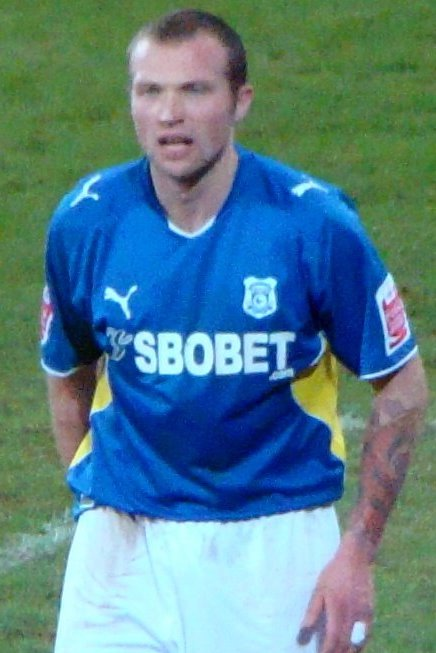
Feeney playing for Cardiff City in 2010.

At the end of his loan spell at Cardiff he agreed a three-year deal with the club, but he failed to find the net in a competitive game, his only goal coming in a pre-season friendly against Dutch side FC Twente. However, considering the deal he had just signed it was perhaps surprising when he was loaned to Swansea City for four months from 21 August 2007

=== Swansea City ===
He scored his first goal for Swansea on 2 October, in a 2–1 win over Swindon Town and began to establish himself in the side, scoring 5 goals in ten matches, but on 15 December, while playing for Swansea in a match against Southend United he sustained injury to an ankle ligament after a heavy tackle by Lewis Hunt. His injury ended his opportunity of a permanent switch to Swansea, who had already held talks with Cardiff about a permanent deal.

Warren's grandfather, Jim Feeney had also played for Swansea in the 1940s, and also won international caps for Northern Ireland – they were the first grandfather/grandson to have played for the Swans.

In January 2008, Swansea manager Roberto Martínez put an end to the transfer speculation by stating that "it is going to be very, very difficult to agree something over Warren" meaning that he will not be moving to them in January but Martínez also mentioned that a summer move would not be out of the question. league 1 winner with swansea 2007

=== Cardiff City ===
Back at Cardiff, he returned from the injury in March 2008, coming on as a 90th-minute substitute for Paul Parry during a 1–0 win over Hull City but suffered another injury two weeks later during a 0–0 with West Bromwich Albion which ended his season.

=== Dundee United ===
In July 2008, Feeney joined fellow Cardiff City player Willo Flood on loan at Scottish Premier League side Dundee United. In only his third friendly game for Dundee United, he scored a hat-trick against Raith Rovers at Stark's Park, although he did not score his first competitive goal until November. He went on to score 6 league goals for the Scottish club by the end of the season, only for a groin injury to put an end to his loan spell.

=== Return to Cardiff ===
After returning to Cardiff again his injury woes continued, and in July 2009 it was reported on the BBC website that Feeney would miss the start of the 2009–10 season as he would undergo hip surgery, he would also miss vital World Cup games for Northern Ireland. This problem was believed to have come to light during a medical with League One side Leeds United, the club where he started his career, but after failing this medical the move was called off.

He returned to action for Cardiff on 17 October 2009, when came on as a substitute for Chris Burke during a 1–1 draw with Crystal Palace.

=== Sheffield Wednesday ===
On 26 November 2009, Feeney joined Championship side Sheffield Wednesday on loan until the end of December. Cardiff manager Dave Jones stated that Feeney would return to Cardiff at the end of his loan spell after only playing 13 minutes for Sheffield Wednesday, during which time the manager who signed him, Brian Laws, was sacked after a string of poor results.

=== Oldham Athletic ===
Following Cardiff's playoff final defeat, the club released five players, including Feeney. On 14 July 2010, Feeney joined Football League One side Oldham Athletic. He scored his first and only goal for the club in a FA Cup first round match on 6 November 2010 against Accrington Stanley. On 3 August 2011, he had his contract terminated.

=== Plymouth Argyle ===
Feeney signed a one-year contract with Plymouth Argyle in August 2011. He made his debut in a 1–1 draw at Shrewsbury Town and scored his first goal in a 2–0 win against Macclesfield Town. Having made 30 appearances in his first season with Argyle, Feeney signed a one-year contract extension in May 2012. He scored a further three goals in 22 appearances in 2012–13 before a knee injury sidelined him for the rest of the campaign. Feeney was released at the end of the season, but returned on trial in July to try and earn a new contract, and scored in one of the club's friendly matches.

=== Salisbury City ===
He joined Salisbury City on 20 July 2013 as player-assistant manager to new manager Mikey Harris. He left the club at the end of the 2013–14 season, after becoming manager of Linfield.

=== Return to playing ===
Following the end of his professional career, Feeney often featured in games for charity organisation the Argyle Legends, a side made up of players all with a link to Plymouth Argyle.

In January 2019, Feeney represented Northern Ireland at the 2019 Star Sixes tournament. Later that month it was revealed that Feeney had signed for Cornish side Callington Town, of the South West Peninsula League; the 10th level of English football. In August 2019, Feeney made one appearance for NIFL Championship club Ards during his spell as manager.

== International career ==
Feeney is a Northern Irish former. He won 46 caps playing for his country, and also made eight appearances at under-21 level. He scored his first international goal against Azerbaijan in September 2005, also netting in a friendly against Portugal. His third goal came against Denmark in the Euro 2008 Qualifier, heading an equaliser in the 61st minute. In April 2009, Feeney scored his fifth and final international goal, the only goal of the game as Northern Ireland beat Slovenia 1–0 in a World Cup Qualifier.

=== International goals ===
Scores and results list Northern Ireland's goal tally first.

#	Date	Venue	Opponent	Score	Result	Competition
1	3 September 2005	Windsor Park, Belfast	Azerbaijan	2–0	2–0	2006 FIFA World Cup qualification
2	15 November 2005	Windsor Park, Belfast	Portugal	1–1	1–1	Friendly match
3	17 November 2007	Windsor Park, Belfast	Denmark	1–1	2–1	UEFA Euro 2008 qualifying
4	28 March 2009	Windsor Park, Belfast	Poland	1–0	3–2	2010 FIFA World Cup qualification
5	1 April 2009	Windsor Park, Belfast	Slovenia	1–0	1–0	2010 FIFA World Cup qualification

== Managerial career ==
=== Linfield ===
On 26 April 2014, it was announced that Feeney would replace David Jeffrey as manager of NIFL Premiership side Linfield in his native city of Belfast, Northern Ireland. He officially took charge of the club on 1 May 2014, signing a two-year contract. Feeney later decided to combine his managerial role at the club with playing duties. He made his debut in a pre-season friendly against Loughgall on 24 June 2014, which Linfield won 2–1. His competitive debut as a player came at "Big Two" rivals Glentoran with Feeney coming on as a substitute in a 3–2 win.

His cousin, Lee Feeney, played for the club in two different spells between 1997–1999 and 2002–2003.

=== Newport County ===
On 6 October 2015 Feeney was appointed as assistant manager to John Sheridan at League Two club Newport County.

On 15 January 2016 Feeney was promoted to be the club's manager following Sheridan's move to Oldham. Andy Todd was appointed as his assistant manager.

Feeney ensured a good start to his tenure with a run of six wins in his first 11 games, gaining 21 points, and 21 points of a possible 36. As the season continued however, results then worsened, ending the season with a winless run of 11 games. Newport finished the season in 22nd place in League Two, avoiding relegation.

Newport started the 2016–17 season poorly with Newport County bottom of League Two by September, and after defeats against Grimsby and relegation rivals Cambridge United, Newport only had one win, and 6 points, from their opening 9 matches of the 2016–17 season. Feeney and Todd were sacked by Newport on 28 September 2016.

Newport captain Scott Bennett expressed his disappointment, stating he was "gutted" at the news of Feeney's departure. Feeney met Newport again in League Two the following season as assistant manager of Crawley, losing the fixture 2–1. A South Wales Argust columnist remarked one year on that Feeney thought the Newport board had been hasty in sacking him, given that his successor Graham Westley was sacked and Mike Flynn went on to lead the side to a spell of good form.

=== Crawley Town and Notts County ===
On 25 May 2017, Feeney was appointed assistant manager to Harry Kewell at Crawley Town. The duo led the side to a 14th-place finish in League Two for 2017–18.

The pair departed Crawley for Notts County in controversial fashion in August 2018, with some claiming Notts County were "raiding" the side of its best players including Enzio Boldewijn and Robert Milsom, after only 15 months in charge.

On 13 November 2018, Kewell and Feeney both left Notts County. The pair were only given ten weeks in charge of the side, winning only three of their fourteen fixtures.

=== Ards ===
In February 2019 Feeney returned to Northern Ireland as manager of NIFL Premiership side Ards. Feeney's father Warren Sr, grandfather, and his cousins Lee and Cullen have all played for the side during their careers. He appointed his cousin and former Ards forward Lee Feeney

He began the 2019–20 season well, leading the side off the bottom of the table for the first time in months and managing a 3–1 victory against Newry to put the club in the 11th-placed play-off slot. He nearly ensured survival for Ards after a late run to secure 13 points from the last nine games but could not turn the season around. The side dropped down to the NIFL Championship in 2019–20 after losing a promotion/relegation play-off to Carrick Rangers.

In May 2019 Feeney signed a two-year contract extension.

=== Northern Ireland U21 ===
In March 2022, Feeney was announced as assistant manager of the Northern Ireland U21 side on a short term basis.

=== Pirin Blagoevgrad ===
Feeney joined Bulgarian second division side OFC Pirin Blagoevgrad as manager in November 2019 after a recommendation by an English former teammate who was assisting the side in their recruitment process. The side has recently been acquired by Dubai-based owners who are planning investment in the Bulgarian side. Feeney was joined at the side by fellow Irish footballer Conor Henderson who has been with the club since August 2017. Feeney went on to lead Pirin Blagoevgrad to the league title and promotion to the A group of Bulgarian football. In early December 2021, Feeney and his technical team were released from Pirin following a cost cutting strategy at the club.

=== Welling United ===
On 14 March 2022, a day after the departure of Peter Taylor, Feeney was appointed manager of Welling United. Feeney left the club in June 2023, amid rumours linking him to the vacant Glentoran job.

=== Glentoran ===
He was announced as Glentoran's new manager on 5 June 2023. Whilst Glentoran manager he gave a senior debut to his son George. He left the club by mutual consent on 15 March 2024.

=== Weymouth ===
On 17 December 2024, Feeney was appointed manager of National League South bottom side Weymouth. He got the club to place second from bottom but successive losses has led Weymouth to fall back to bottom. Feeney's first win as Weymouth manager came on 1 February 2025, in a 5–1 home victory against his former club, Welling United.

He was relegated with Weymouth on 5 April 2025. He also won the 2024–25 Dorset Senior Cup with Weymouth.

He left the club on 26 August 2025.

=== Hanoi ===
On 6 October 2025, Feeney joined Harry Kewell (who became Hanoi's manager) as an assistant manager at V.League 1 club Hanoi.

=== Sligo Rovers ===
On 31 July 2026, it was announced that Feeney had joined League of Ireland Premier Division side Sligo Rovers as assistant manager to newly appointed manager Darren Purse, who he had played with during his playing career.

== Managerial statistics ==
As of match played 25 August 2025

Team	From	To	Record				
Team	From	To	G	W	D	L	Win %
Linfield	1 May 2014	6 October 2015	62	36	11	15	58.06
Newport County	15 January 2016	28 September 2016	34	7	8	19	20.59
Ards	19 February 2019	16 November 2019	11	3	4	4	27.27
Pirin Blagoevgrad	17 November 2019	3 December 2021	54	24	11	19	44.44
Welling United	14 March 2022	5 June 2023	62	20	17	25	32.26
Glentoran	5 June 2023	15 March 2024	46	23	10	13	50.00
Weymouth	17 December 2024	26 August 2025	32	5	10	17	15.63
Total			301	118	71	112	39.20

== Honours ==
=== As a Manager ===
Pirin Blagoevgrad

- Second Professional Football League: 2020–21

Weymouth

- Dorset Senior Cup: 2024–25

Individual

- Second Professional Football League Manager of the Year: 2020–21
