= Júlio Amaral =

Brazilian footballer (1946–2026)

Personal information
- Full name: Júlio Laerte Camilo do Amaral
- Date of birth: 2 May 1946
- Place of birth: São Paulo, Brazil
- Date of death: 14 November 2026 (aged 80)
- Place of death: São Paulo, Brazil
- Position: Midfielder

Senior career*
Years	Team	Apps	(Gls)
1965–1969	Palmeiras	80	(10)
1966–1967	→ Botafogo-SP (loan)		
1969–1971	Grêmio		
1971	Fluminense		
1972–1975	Botafogo-SP		
1976	Aliança São Bernardo		
1977	Prudentina		
- * Club domestic league appearances and goals

Júlio Laerte Camilo do Amaral (2 May 1946 – 14 November 2026), better known as Júlio Amaral, was a Brazilian professional footballer who played as midfielder.

== Career ==
Júlio began his career with SE Palmeiras, where he made 80 appearances and scored 10 goals, winning the 1965 Torneio Rio-São Paulo. He also had notable stints with Fluminense, Grêmio, and Botafogo de Ribeirão Preto.

== Personal life and death ==
Júlio is the father of fellow player Leandro Amaral. After retiring, he became the owner of a newsstand in the Cambuci neighborhood of São Paulo. He died on 14 November 2026, at the age of 80.

== Honours ==
Palmeiras

- Torneio Rio-São Paulo: 1965

Fluminense

- Taça Guanabara: 1971
