= Ashfield Boys' High School =

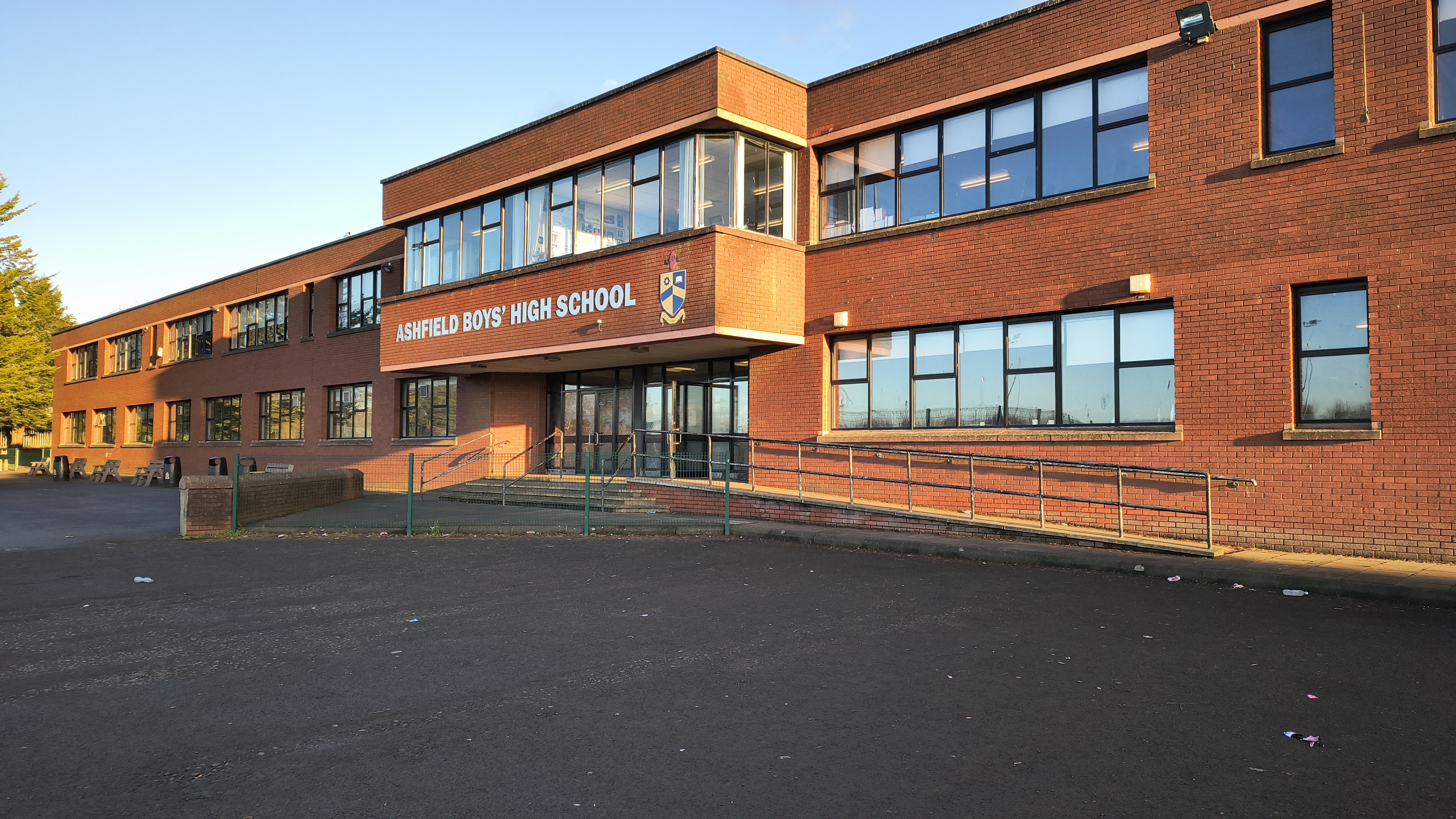

Location
- Holywood Road; Belfast, Antrim, BT4 2LY; Northern Ireland; 54°36′34″N 5°51′48″W

Information
- Type: High school
- Motto: Pariter manus et mens (equally hand and mind)
- Religious affiliation: Protestant
- Established: 2 September 1953
- Local authority: BELB
- Chair: Thomas R Haire
- Principal: Alistair Duffield
- Gender: Boys
- Age: 11 to 18
- Enrolment: 855
- Colours: Blue & yellow
- Publication: Ashfield inform (School Magazine)
- Website: https://www.ashfieldboys.org.uk/

Ashfield Boys' High School is a secondary school in Belfast.

== Notable alumni ==
- David McCreery - professional footballer, played for Northern Ireland QPR, Manchester United and Newcastle United.
- Gary Moore - guitarist - Skid Row, Thin Lizzy and Colosseum II
- Sammy McIlroy - professional footballer and manager, played for Northern Ireland, Manchester United and Stoke City
- Warren Feeney - professional footballer and manager; played for Northern Ireland, Leeds, Bournemouth
- Jordan Adetunji - Grammy nominated musician and rapper.
- George Feeney - footballer who played for Glentoran now plays for Tottenham Hotspur academy

== School pitch use ==
St Matthews Football Club use Ashfield Boys' pitches. In 2024, Belfast City Council agreed to pay out £30k as a part of the sporting pitches investment strategy to improve the facilities.
