= Jim Feeney =

Northern Irish footballer

Personal information
- Full name: James McBurney Feeney
- Date of birth: 23 June 1921
- Place of birth: Belfast, Northern Ireland
- Date of death: March 1985 (age 63)
- Height: 5 ft 9 1/2 in (1.77 m)
- Position: Defender

Senior career*
Years	Team	Apps	(Gls)
1939–1941	Crusaders		
1941–1946	Linfield		
1946–1950	Swansea Town	88	(0)
1950–1956	Ipswich Town	214	(0)
1957–1959	Toronto Ulster United FC		

International career
1946–1949	Ireland	2	(0)

Managerial career
- 1958: Toronto Ulster United FC
- 1964: St. Andrews
- * Club domestic league appearances and goals

James McBurney Feeney (23 June 1921 – March 1985) was a Northern Irish professional footballer. During his career he made almost 100 appearances for Swansea City and over 200 appearances for Ipswich Town. Feeney's son and grandson, both named Warren, later represented Northern Ireland.

== Club career ==
Born in Belfast, Feeney began his career as a junior with Crusaders. After they withdrew from football in 1941 due to the Second World War, he moved to Linfield with whom he played throughout the war as a winger before moving to full back. He helped the side win three wartime league championships and Irish Cup's before moving to Swansea Town in December 1946. After several years at Vetch Field, Feeney was appointed team captain and led Swansea to the Division Three South title before moving to Ipswich Town in March 1950. He made over 200 appearances at Portman Road before retiring in April 1956.

In 1957, he played abroad in Canada's National Soccer League with Toronto Ulster United FC. The following season he served as a player-coach for Ulster United. He re-signed with Toronto for the 1959 NSL season.

== International career ==
Feeney represented Ireland twice in wartime internationals, later winning his first full cap on 27 November 1946 in a 0–0 draw with Scotland. His second and final cap came three years later in a 9–2 defeat to England during the 1950 British Home Championship.

== Managerial career ==
Feeney was the player-coach for Toronto Ulster United in 1958 and briefly served as the club's general manager. He was also named the National Soccer League's All-Star head coach in 1958. In 1964, he was named the head coach for St. Andrews of the Ontario Soccer League. Following his time in Canada, Feeney returned to Northern Ireland, managing Ards' reserves.
