= Saliou Lassissi =

Ivorian footballer (born 1978)

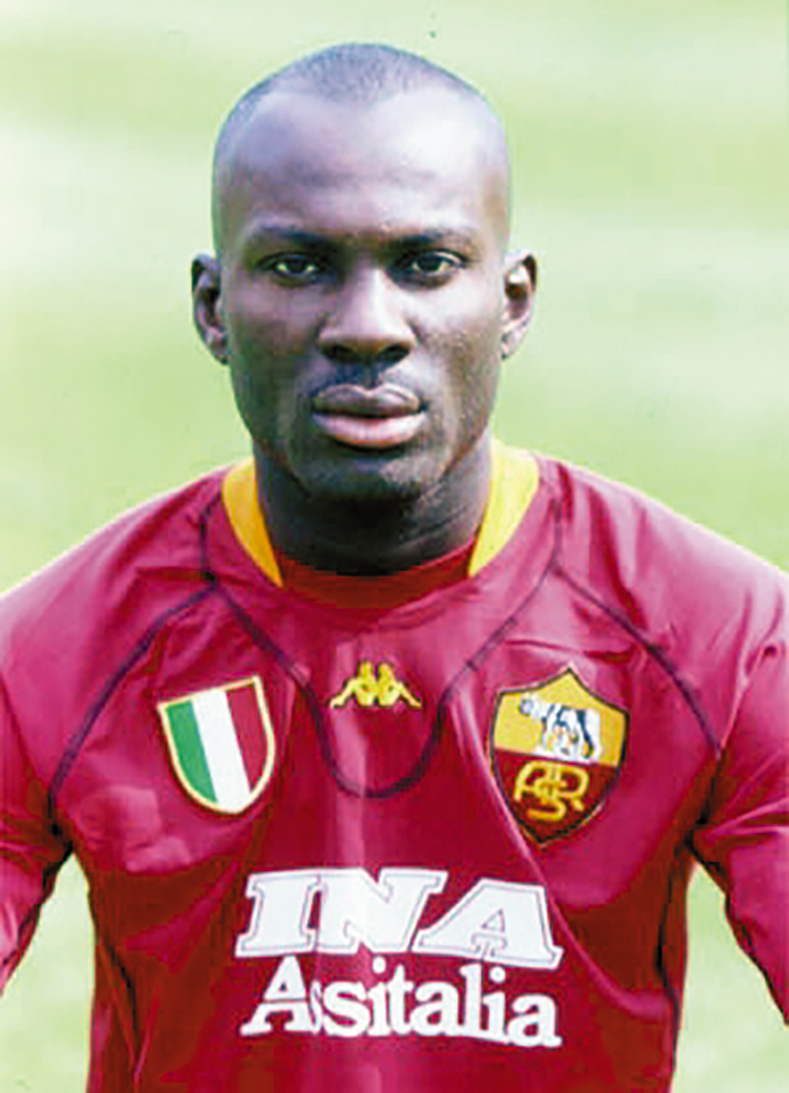

Personal information
- Date of birth: 15 August 1978 (age 48)
- Place of birth: Abidjan, Ivory Coast
- Height: 1.85 m (6 ft 1 in)
- Positions: Centre-back; right-back

Youth career
- 1994–1996: Rennes

Senior career*
Years	Team	Apps	(Gls)
1996–1998	Rennes	28	(0)
1998–2001	Parma	15	(0)
1998–1999	→ Sampdoria (loan)	19	(1)
2000–2001	→ Fiorentina (loan)	14	(1)
2001–2004	Roma	0	(0)
2005–2006	Nancy	0	(0)
2007	Bellinzona	3	(0)
2007–2008	Entente SSG	14	(2)
2011–2012	Sokol Skromnica		
Total		93	(4)

International career
1998–1999	Ivory Coast	8	(0)
- * Club domestic league appearances and goals

Saliou Lassissi (born 15 August 1978) is an Ivorian former professional footballer who played as a defender, mainly in the role of centre-back, although on occasion he was also employed as right-back.

He acquired French citizenship by naturalization on 20 October 1997.

== Honours ==
Parma

- Supercoppa Italiana: 1999

Fiorentina

- Coppa Italia: 2000–01
