= Christian Amoroso =

Italian footballer and coach (born 1976)

Personal information
- Date of birth: 22 September 1976 (age 50)
- Place of birth: Pisa, Italy
- Height: 1.76 m (5 ft 9 in)
- Position: Midfielder

Team information
- Current team: Seravezza Pozzi (head coach)

Youth career
- Fiorentina

Senior career*
Years	Team	Apps	(Gls)
1996–2002	Fiorentina	120	(2)
1996–1997	→ Empoli (loan)	33	(2)
2002–2009	Bologna	197	(6)
2009–2010	Ascoli	32	(2)
2010–2011	Pisa	9	(0)

International career
1997	Italy U21	1	(0)

Managerial career
- 2012–2014: Pisa (youth)
- 2015: Pisa
- 2016: Ponsacco
- 2016–2017: Ghiviborgo
- 2017: Sestri Levante
- 2019–2021: Real Forte
- 2022–: Seravezza Pozzi
- * Club domestic league appearances and goals

Christian Amoroso (born 22 September 1976) is an Italian football coach and former player who is the head coach of Serie D club Seravezza Pozzi. He played as a midfielder.

== Playing career ==
After spells with Fiorentina and Empoli, Amoroso was signed by Bologna in the summer of 2002, on a free transfer.

On 11 August 2009, he signed a one-year contract with Ascoli of Serie B. He played his first match for the club on 15 August, a Coppa Italia match losing to Cittadella in 2–1. He ended his playing career with his hometown club, Pisa.

== Coaching career ==
On 14 June 2017, Amoroso was appointed head coach of Sestri Levante

On 21 July 2019, he joined Serie D club Real Forte.

After leaving Real Forte Querceta by the end of the 2020–21 season, on 13 December 2022 Amoroso was hired as new head coach of Serie D club Seravezza Pozzi.

== Honours ==
Fiorentina

- Coppa Italia: 2000–01
