= Georgios Vakouftsis =

Greek footballer

Personal information
- Full name: Georgios Vakouftsis
- Date of birth: 30 January 1980 (age 46)
- Place of birth: Kalabaka, Greece
- Height: 1.92 m (6 ft 4 in)
- Position: Striker

Team information
- Current team: SV Merselo
- Number: 10

Senior career*
Years	Team	Apps	(Gls)
1998–1999	Panathinaikos	0	(0)
1999–2002	Fiorentina	9	(0)
2000–2001	→ Ravenna (loan)	5	(1)
2001–2002	→ Iraklis (loan)	11	(1)
2002–2005	APOEL	49	(23)
2005–2007	Omonia	64	(29)
2007–2009	Ergotelis	29	(2)
2009	Skoda Xanthi	3	(0)
2010	Anagennisi Karditsa	13	(1)
2011	PAEEK	1	(0)

International career
- Greece U-21
- * Club domestic league appearances and goals

Georgios Vakouftsis (Greek: Γιώργος Βακουφτσής; born 30 January 1980) is a Greek footballer. He last played for PAEEK FC in Cyprus, previously he played as a forward for Anagennisi Karditsa in the Gamma Ethniki. A striker, he is 192 cm tall.

== Career ==
Born in Kalabaka, Vakouftsis began playing football for Panathinaikos' youth side. His body shape led Fiorentina's scouts to sign him from Panathinaikos youth team in 1999. His early performance was one of the key factors for Vakouftsis to gain the nickname "Il Greco Batistuta", due to the Argentine legend striker of Viola. His return in the Super League Greece for Iraklis on loan did not meet expectations, and in 2002 he moved in Cyprus to play for APOEL and later for rivals AC Omonia. In Cyprus Vakouftsis proved his calibre, scoring 52 goals in 113 appearances for the two clubs. In 2008, he moved back in Greece to play for Cretan club Ergotelis F.C. and in the summer of 2009 he signed for Skoda Xanthi Vakouftsis played only three games for Xanthi in the league and because he was considered as a backup for the first team he requested a transfer. On 14 January 2010 he signed for Anagennisi Karditsa F.C. which caused much surprise in the Greek football transfer market. His contract is for six months and he is considered as a great addition to the squad. In January 2011 he returned to Cyprus to play for PAEEK FC in the second division.

His former clubs include: Panathinaikos, ACF Fiorentina, Ravenna Calcio, Iraklis, APOEL, AC Omonia, Ergotelis F.C. and Skoda Xanthi.
