= Warren Feeney Sr. =

Northern Irish former footballer

Warren Feeney
Personal information
- Full name: Warren Feeney Sr.
- Date of birth: 1949 (age 76–77)
- Place of birth: Swansea, Wales
- Position: Left winger

Senior career*
| Years | Team | Apps | (Gls) |
| 1967–1968 | Ards | ? | (9) |
| 1968–1970 | Linfield | ? | (?) |
| 1970–1971 | Distillery | ? | (0) |
| 1971–1972 | Stoke City | 0 | (0) |
| 1972–1978 | Glentoran | 222 | (188) |
| 1978–1981 | Linfield | ? | (45) |
| 1981–1982 | Crusaders | ? | (5) |
| Total | | ? | (247) |

International career
| 1976 | Northern Ireland | 1 | (0) |
- * Club domestic league appearances and goals

Warren Feeney (born 1949) is a Northern Irish former footballer who played at both professional and international levels as a left winger.

== Career ==
Born in Swansea, Wales while his father Jim was playing for Swansea Town, Feeney played between 1967 and 1982 for Ards, Linfield, Distillery, Stoke City, Glentoran and Crusaders. He was the Ulster Footballer of the Year and Northern Ireland Football Writers' Association Player of the Year for 1975–76.

He also made one appearance for Northern Ireland in 1976.

== Personal life ==
Both Feeney's father Jim and son Warren have represented Northern Ireland at international football.
