= Daniele Ficagna =

Italian footballer (born 1981)

Personal information
- Date of birth: 21 February 1981 (age 45)
- Place of birth: Piombino, Italy
- Height: 1.86 m (6 ft 1 in)
- Positions: Centre back; right back

Team information
- Current team: Carrarese (U19 Manager)

Senior career*
Years	Team	Apps	(Gls)
1999–2004	Spezia	53	(0)
2000–2001	→ Fiorentina (loan)	0	(0)
2001–2002	→ Fiorentina (loan)	0	(0)
2004–2007	Cesena	80	(3)
2007–2011	Siena	50	(2)
2011–2012	Empoli	23	(1)
2013	Frosinone	5	(0)
2014	Lanciano	2	(0)
2015	Savona	7	(0)
2015–2016	Siena	5	(1)
2016	Olimpia Colligiana	3	(1)
2016–2017	US Fezzanese	9	(0)

Managerial career
- 2017–2018: Carrarese (U17)
- 2018–: Carrarese (U19)
- * Club domestic league appearances and goals

Daniele Ficagna (born 21 February 1981) is a retired Italian footballer who played as a defender. He is currently the U19 manager of Carrarese Calcio.

== Club career ==
Ficagna was signed by Serie B club S.S. Virtus Lanciano 1924 on 19 March 2014.

On 3 January 2015 he was signed by Savona, after without a club for 6 months.

On 29 August 2015 Ficagna was signed by Lega Pro newcomer Siena.

== Coaching career ==
Retiring at the end of the 2016–17 season, Ficagna was appointed manager of the Carrarese Calcio U17 team. After an excellent season, he was promoted to manager of the clubs Beretti team, also known as the U19's.
