= Giovanni Bartolucci =

Italian footballer (born 1984)

Personal information
- Date of birth: 27 February 1984 (age 42)
- Place of birth: Bibbiena, Italy
- Height: 1.83 m (6 ft 0 in)
- Position: Defender

Youth career
- Fiorentina
- 2002–2004: Juventus

Senior career*
Years	Team	Apps	(Gls)
2000–2002	Fiorentina	1	(0)
2004–2006	Juventus	0	(0)
2004–2005	→ Crotone (loan)	5	(0)
2005	→ Pisa (loan)	5	(0)
2005–2006	→ Torres (loan)	20	(0)
2006–2011	Siena	0	(0)
2007–2008	→ Monza (loan)		
2008–2009	→ Pistoiese (loan)		
2009–2010	→ Lecco (loan)		
2010–2011	→ Gubbio (loan)	25	(1)
2011–2014	Gubbio		

International career
2000	Italy U15	7	(0)
2000–01	Italy U16	7	(0)
2002	Italy U18	5	(0)
2002–03	Italy U19	4	(0)
2003	Italy U20	2	(0)
- * Club domestic league appearances and goals

Giovanni Bartolucci (born 27 February 1984) is an Italian former professional footballer who played as a defender.

== Career ==
A youth product of Fiorentina, Bartolucci made his Serie A debut on 10 June 2001, in a 3–0 away loss to Lazio. Bartolucci signed for Juventus on a free transfer in 2002. Bartolucci was sent on loan to Crotone in 2004, along with Tomas Guzman, Abdoulay Konko, Matteo Paro, Antonio Mirante and Daniele Gastaldello.

Bartolucci was sent on loan to Siena in 2006, with Gastaldello, Konko, Andrea Masiello and Douglas Packer. Siena also holds half of the players' rights.

He joined Monza on loan in August 2007. He was later sent on loan to Pistoiese, Lecco and Gubbio. Bartolucci joined Gubbio on a free transfer in the summer of 2011.

== Honours ==
Fiorentina

- Coppa Italia: 2000–01
