= Marco Rossi (footballer, born 1978) =

Italian footballer

Personal information
- Date of birth: 1 April 1978 (age 48)
- Place of birth: Seravezza, Italy
- Height: 1.79 m (5 ft 10 in)
- Position: Midfielder

Youth career
- Lucchese

Senior career*
Years	Team	Apps	(Gls)
1995–1998	Lucchese	31	(0)
1998–2000	Salernitana	45	(3)
2000–2002	Fiorentina	36	(1)
2002–2004	Como	19	(0)
2003–2004	→ Genoa (loan)	38	(8)
2004–2013	Genoa	230	(30)
Total		399	(42)

International career
1997–2000	Italy U21	6	(0)
- * Club domestic league appearances and goals as of 20 May 2012

Marco Rossi (born 1 April 1978) is a retired Italian footballer who played as a right midfielder.

He played most of his 18-year professional career with Genoa, appearing in nearly 300 official games during nine seasons, six spent in Serie A.

== Club career ==
=== Early years ===
Born in Seravezza, in the Province of Lucca, Rossi started playing football with Lucchese in Serie B, moving for the 1998–99 campaign to Salernitana, newly promoted to Serie A. After two seasons he joined A.C. Fiorentina (for 17 billion lire; €8.78 million in cash plus player deal) and returned to the top division, remaining in Florence for two years.

In 2002, Rossi left Fiorentina due to unpaid wages (the club declared bankruptcy shortly after) and signed with modest Como, appearing sparingly in his first season and being relegated from the top flight.

=== Genoa ===
In 2003–04, Rossi joined Genoa C.F.C. in the second level, on loan, being an instrumental figure from the start and scoring a career-best eight goals in his first year. He then returned to Como, but returned to his previous club in the 2005 January transfer window after his contract expired.

Genoa was initially promoted at the end of the season, as champions, but suffered relegation to Serie C1 instead, with Rossi remaining with the team, which achieved promotion in 2006. In the 2006–07 campaign he became club captain, and the club returned to division one alongside Juventus FC, under manager Gian Piero Gasperini. The player's versatility – he was capable of playing as either a defender or a midfielder, on either side – made him an undisputed starter, and he contributed to that promotion with three goals.

On 30 March 2008, in a league game against Reggina Calcio, Rossi scored his second goal in the top level, closing the score in the 90th minute (2–0, at home). He only missed four games as the club finally finished tenth.

Although he appeared less in the 2008–09 season, Rossi netted on five occasions. On 28 November 2009, during the 101st Derby della Lanterna, against U.C. Sampdoria, he scored the second goal, in an eventual 3–0 home win; in February of the following year, he scored against A.C. Chievo Verona (the game's only) and added two the following week at Juventus, albeit in a 2–3 away defeat.

Rossi retired from football at the end of the 2012–13 campaign, aged 35. He was immediately appointed Genoa's director of football.

== International career ==
Rossi collected six caps for the Italian U-21s, helping the national side win the 2000 European Championship.

== Honours ==
=== Club ===
Fiorentina

- Coppa Italia: 2000–01

=== International ===
Italy Under-21

- UEFA European Under-21 Championship: 2000
