= Leandro Amaral =

Brazilian footballer (born 1977)

Personal information
- Full name: Leandro Câmara do Amaral
- Date of birth: 6 August 1977 (age 49)
- Place of birth: São Paulo, Brazil
- Height: 1.77 m (5 ft 10 in)
- Position: Forward

Youth career
- 1995–1996: Portuguesa

Senior career*
Years	Team	Apps	(Gls)
1997–2000	Portuguesa	73	(29)
2000–2001	Fiorentina	20	(5)
2001	Grêmio	9	(3)
2002	São Paulo	19	(2)
2003	Palmeiras	0	(0)
2003	Corinthians	8	(1)
2004	Ituano	0	(0)
2004	Portuguesa	17	(11)
2005	Istres	1	(0)
2005–2006	Portuguesa	2	(1)
2006–2007	Vasco da Gama	43	(21)
2008	Fluminense	0	(0)
2008	Vasco da Gama	28	(11)
2009	Fluminense	7	(0)
2010	Flamengo	4	(0)

International career
2000	Brazil U-23	2	(0)
2001	Brazil	4	(0)
- * Club domestic league appearances and goals

Leandro Câmara do Amaral (born 6 August 1977), is a Brazilian former professional footballer who played as a forward.

== Career statistics ==
Appearances and goals by club, season and competition
Club	Season	League			Copa do Brasil		League cup		Continental		Total	
Club	Season	Division	Apps	Goals	Apps	Goals	Apps	Goals	Apps	Goals	Apps	Goals
Portuguesa	1995	Série A	7	0	—	—	—	—	—	—	7	0
Portuguesa	1997	Série A	26	9	1	0	—	—	—	—	27	9
Portuguesa	1998	Série A	29	15	4	3	—	—	—	—	33	18
Portuguesa	1999	Série A	11	4	3	1	—	—	—	—	14	5
Portuguesa	2000	Série A	—	—	5	5	—	—	—	—	5	5
Grêmio	2001	Série A	9	3	—	—	—	—	—	—	9	3
São Paulo	2002	Série A	19	2	—	—	—	—	—	—	19	2
Palmeiras	2003	Série A	0	0	1	0	—	—	—	—	1	0
Corinthians	2003	Série A	8	1	—	—	—	—	—	—	8	1
Vasco da Gama	2006	Série A	12	7	—	—	—	—	—	—	12	7
Vasco da Gama	2007	Série A	31	14	2	2	12	10	5	3	50	29
Fluminense	2008	Série A	—	—	—	—	—	—	—	—	0	0
Vasco da Gama	2008	Série A	28	11	4	3	—	—	1	0	33	14
Fluminense	2009	Série A	7	0	—	—	—	—	—	—	7	0
Flamengo	2010	Série A	4	0	—	—	—	—	—	—	4	0
Career total			191	66	21	12	12	10	6	3	230	91

== Personal life ==
Leandro is son of the also footballer Júlio Amaral.

== Honours ==
Fiorentina

- Coppa Italia: 2000–01

Individual

- Bola de Prata: 2007
