= Nuno Gomes =

Portuguese footballer (born 1976)

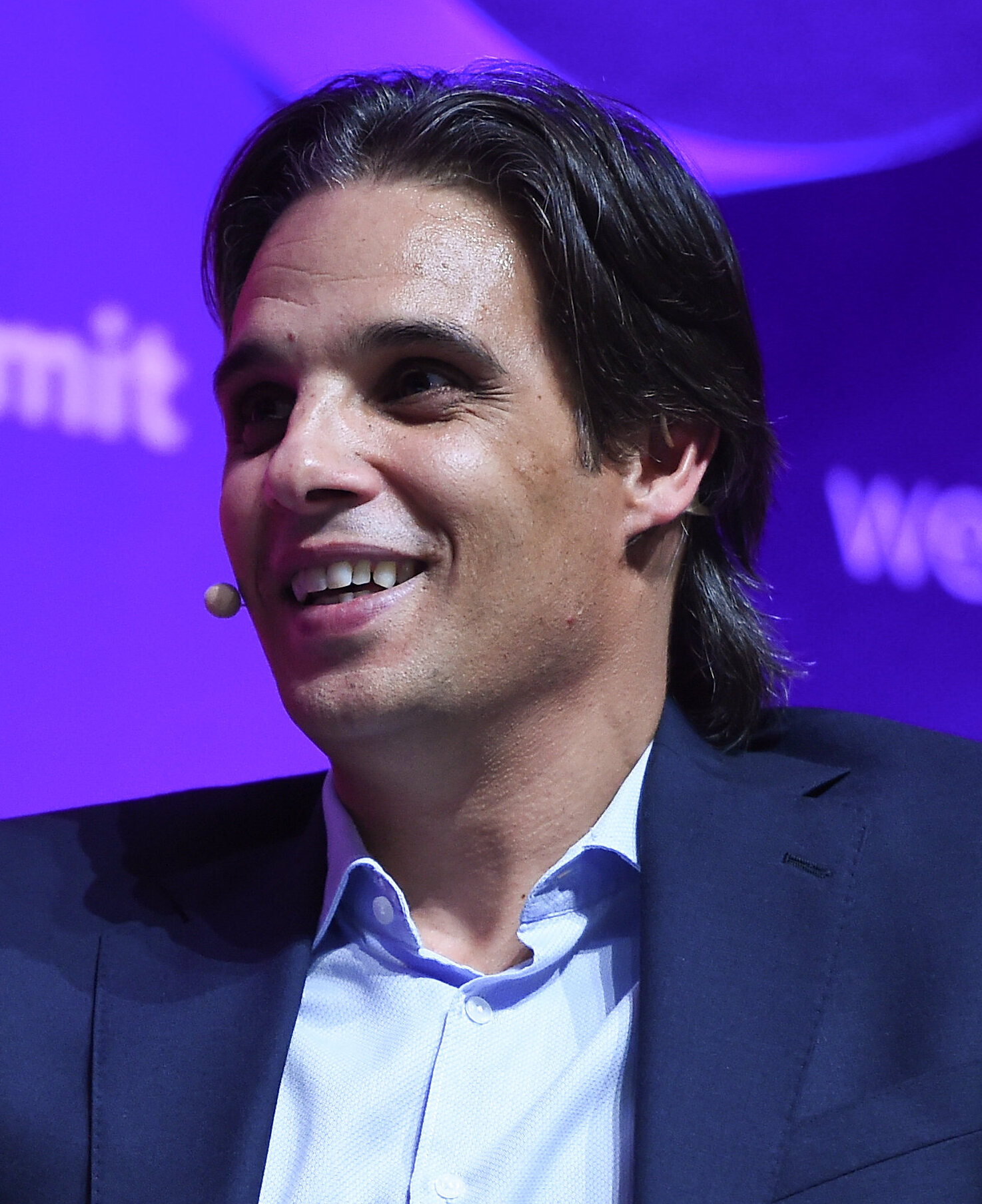
- Gomes in 2017

Personal information
- Full name: Nuno Miguel Soares Pereira Ribeiro
- Date of birth: 5 July 1976 (age 50)
- Place of birth: Amarante, Portugal
- Height: 1.81 m (5 ft 11 in)
- Position: Striker

Youth career
- 1987–1990: Amarante
- 1990–1994: Boavista

Senior career*
Years	Team	Apps	(Gls)
1994–1997	Boavista	79	(23)
1997–2000	Benfica	101	(60)
2000–2002	Fiorentina	53	(14)
2002–2011	Benfica	193	(65)
2011–2012	Braga	20	(6)
2012–2013	Blackburn Rovers	18	(4)
Total		464	(172)

International career
1990	Portugal U15	3	(3)
1991–1992	Portugal U16	9	(4)
1992–1993	Portugal U17	5	(2)
1993–1994	Portugal U18	15	(5)
1995–1996	Portugal U20	13	(9)
1995–1997	Portugal U21	14	(5)
1996	Portugal U23	5	(1)
1996–2011	Portugal	79	(29)
Medal record
Men's football
Representing Portugal
UEFA European Championship
Runner-up	2004 Portugal
Bronze medal – third place	2000 Belgium-Netherlands
FIFA U-20 World Cup
Third place	1995 Qatar
- * Club domestic league appearances and goals

Nuno Miguel Soares Pereira Ribeiro OIH (born 5 July 1976), known as Nuno Gomes, is a Portuguese former professional footballer who played as a striker.

He was given the nickname Gomes during childhood after Fernando Gomes, and was regarded as one of the country's most recognisable attacking players in the 1990s and 2000s; he consistently scored for both club and country, and was also capable of being a good link-up player, accumulating a number of assists throughout his career, which was spent mainly with Benfica, for which he netted 166 goals in 398 games over the course of 12 seasons.

Gomes represented Portugal in two World Cups and three European Championships. He helped the national team finish second at Euro 2004 and third at Euro 2000, and won 79 senior caps.

== Club career ==
=== Boavista and Benfica ===
Born in Amarante, Gomes established his reputation with Boavista, where he made his Primeira Liga debut in the 1994–95 season, aged 18. He collected his first silverware as his team beat Benfica to lift the Taça de Portugal in 1997, scoring a goal and winning a penalty kick in a 3–2 win in the final; he and fellow scorer Erwin Sánchez had already agreed to transfer to the opponents.

Gomes ranked joint-fourth top scorer in his last year at the Estádio do Bessa, before moving to Benfica. In the 1998–99 campaign he netted 34 times in all competitions, in an eventual third-place finish in the league.

=== Fiorentina ===
After three seasons at Benfica, his Euro 2000 exploits earned Gomes a €17 million move to Fiorentina. He won the Coppa Italia over Parma in his first year, scoring in a 1–1 draw in the second leg of the final at home, which allowed his team to clinch the title 2–1 on aggregate; however, his second season was less successful, as financial collapse by the Viola and their subsequent relegation precipitated a 2002 return to his previous club on a four-year deal as a free agent.

=== Return to Benfica ===
A series of injuries limited Gomes to under 70 games from 2002 to 2005, but he still helped Benfica win the domestic cup in 2003–04 and the league the following season – in the latter, he contributed seven goals from 23 appearances. He enjoyed his best season in 2005–06, scoring 15 goals in the league, including two in an away win over Porto (2–0) and a hat-trick against União de Leiria, finishing second in the scorers' list and adding the subsequent Supertaça Cândido de Oliveira, where he netted the game's only goal against Vitória de Setúbal.

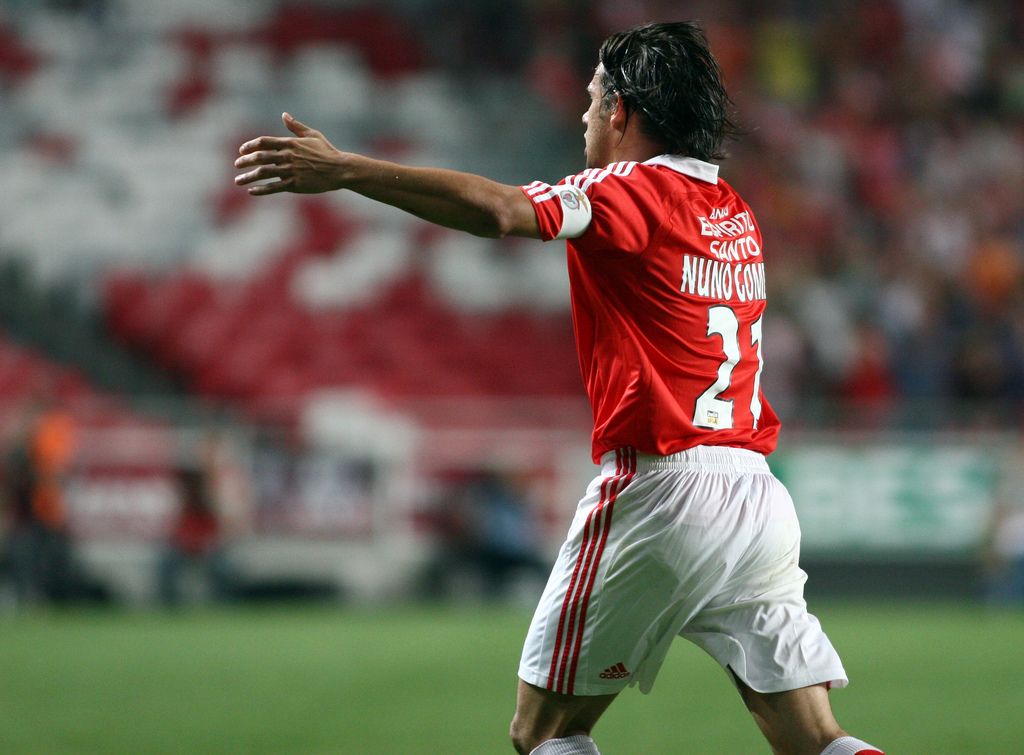
Gomes celebrating a goal for Benfica in 2007

From 2006–07 onwards, Gomes faced tough competition for a starting place: he only netted six times in the league, and would suffer even more after the signing of Paraguayan Óscar Cardozo the following summer. However, still a valuable member of the squad, he finished the campaign with nine overall goals, handing the captain armband to legendary Rui Costa in the process.

On 2 October 2008, Gomes scored his 150th goal for Benfica in a UEFA Cup game against Napoli (2–0 home win, 4–3 aggregate victory) with a fine header. Following the arrival of Argentine Javier Saviola in June 2009, he further fell down the striker pecking order.

Again a reserve player in 2010–11 – but playing even less – the 34-year-old Gomes made the most with the minutes provided to him by manager Jorge Jesus. He scored his first goal in the season on 14 November 2010 in a 4–0 home defeat of Naval, the 200th in the competition, and dedicated it to his father Joaquim who had died in August. In two consecutive league games in March 2011, he scored three goals, one at home against Portimonense (1–1 draw) and two in a 5–1 away rout of Paços de Ferreira, appearing as a late substitute in all three matches.

=== Braga ===
Gomes was released by Benfica on 30 June 2011, after the club decided not to renew his contract; he was, however, offered a position in the managerial structure, effective immediately or when he eventually retired. Shortly after, he signed with fellow top-division Braga.

On 11 September 2011, Gomes scored a brace in a 3–1 home win against Gil Vicente. During his only season with the Minho side, he was mostly used as a backup.

=== Blackburn Rovers ===
On 3 July 2012, Gomes signed a two-year deal at Blackburn Rovers in the EFL Championship, becoming their third signing of the 2012–13 summer transfer window. On 18 August he made his league debut for his new club, against Ipswich Town, scoring his first goal the following round in the 2–1 home victory over Leicester City.

On 28 June 2013, aged 36, Gomes was released. After retiring, he was appointed director of Benfica's academy at Futebol Campus in Seixal, leaving his position in September 2017.

== International career ==
Gomes represented Portugal at every level, earning 143 caps across all youth levels and scoring at an excellent rate. He helped the under-20s to third place in the 1995 FIFA World Youth Championship by netting four goals in as many games, including two in the third-place match against Spain. The following year, he appeared at the 1996 Summer Olympics, finishing fourth.

Gomes made his senior debut at 19, in a 1996 friendly against France. He scored his first goal in Portugal's opening match at the UEFA Euro 2000, marking his fourth start with the winner as the side came from two goals down to beat England 3–2. He finished the competition with four goals as the national team reached the last four, but earned a seven-month international ban after pushing referee Günter Benkö following the semi-final defeat by France, in which he had opened the score; he was selected to the UEFA team of the tournament.

With seven goals in only six matches, Gomes helped Portugal qualify for the 2002 FIFA World Cup – this included four in a 7–1 away demolition of Andorra. He would struggle to hold a starting place in the finals in South Korea and Japan, only appearing twice from the bench. On 19 November 2003 he scored his second hat-trick, in only 21 minutes of play against Kuwait.

Things went better for Gomes at Euro 2004, where he played each game and, after coming on as a half-time substitute, scored the winning goal against Spain to send the hosts through to the quarter-finals. He was often injured during the nation's 2006 World Cup qualifying campaign, only managing to play four times, with one goal; he found limited time at the final stages and only made two appearances, but managed to find the back of the net with a header against hosts Germany in the third-place playoff, a 3–1 defeat.

After the retirement of Pauleta, Gomes was expected to become his successor in the striker role. He played ten matches and scored three times in the Euro 2008 qualifiers, captained Portugal at the finals and scored against Germany in the quarter-finals, thus becoming the fourth player to achieve the feat at three straight European Championships.

Following the appointment of Carlos Queiroz as coach, Gomes was constantly overlooked due to his lack of minutes at Benfica. During the 2010 World Cup qualification, he only took part in four out of 12 fixtures, all as a substitute, with Liédson and Hugo Almeida being preferred; he was one of the 50 preliminary players but was left out of the 23-men squad for the final stages in South Africa, this being the first time the player was left out of a major tournament.

On 7 October 2011, after more than two years out of international play, the 35-year-old Gomes replaced Hélder Postiga in the last minute of a 5–3 home victory over Iceland for the Euro 2012 qualifiers. Four days later, he played against Denmark in what was his last full appearance; due to little playing time for his club in 2011–12, he was left out of Paulo Bento's squad for the finals in Poland and Ukraine.

== Personal life ==
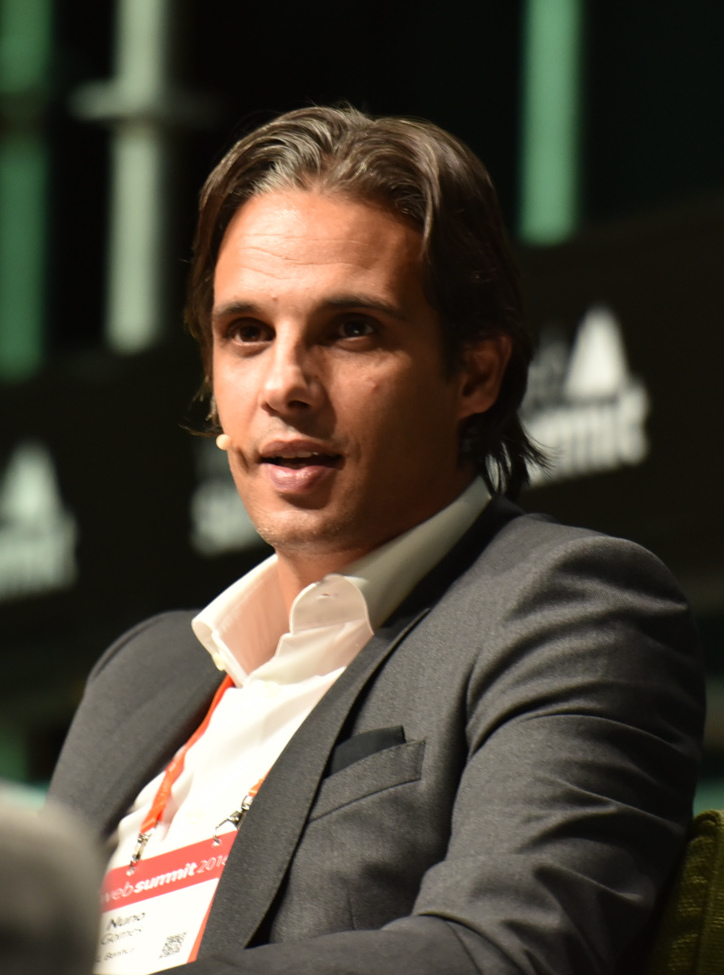
Gomes in 2016

Gomes' younger brother, Tiago (born 1981), was also a footballer and a striker. He spent most of his career in the lower leagues but, from 2004 to 2007, competed in the Segunda Liga with Marco (two seasons) and Olivais e Moscavide (one), totalling 30 games and one goal.

Gomes was married twice, first to Isméria with whom he had a daughter, Laura, born in 1999. In July 2006 he married lawyer Patrícia Aguilar, with whom he also fathered another child, Nuno, born in July 2010.

He was featured on the cover of the Portuguese edition of FIFA Football 2002.

== Career statistics ==
=== Club ===
Appearances and goals by club, season and competition
Club	Season	League			National cup (Note: Includes Taça de Portugal, Coppa Italia, FA Cup)		League cup (Note: Includes Taça da Liga, Football League Cup)		Europe		Total	
Club	Season	Division	Apps	Goals	Apps	Goals	Apps	Goals	Apps	Goals	Apps	Goals
Boavista	1994–95	Primeira Liga	17	1	1	0	–		4	1	22	2
Boavista	1995–96	Primeira Liga	28	7	2	1	–		0	0	30	8
Boavista	1996–97	Primeira Liga	34	15	5	4	–		6	2	45	21
Boavista	Total		79	23	8	5	–		10	3	97	31
Benfica	1997–98	Primeira Liga	33	18	6	4	–		1	0	40	22
Benfica	1998–99	Primeira Liga	34	24	2	3	–		7	7	43	34
Benfica	1999–2000	Primeira Liga	34	18	2	1	–		5	1	41	20
Benfica	Total		101	60	10	8	–		13	8	124	76
Fiorentina	2000–01	Serie A	30	9	3	4	–		0	0	33	13
Fiorentina	2001–02	Serie A	23	5	1	0	–		6	2	31^{1}	7
Fiorentina	Total		53	14	4	4	–		6	2	64	20
Benfica	2002–03	Primeira Liga	28	9	1	0	–		0	0	29	9
Benfica	2003–04	Primeira Liga	21	7	3	0	–		5	5	29	12
Benfica	2004–05	Primeira Liga	23	7	5	2	–		6	3	34	12
Benfica	2005–06	Primeira Liga	29	15	4	1	–		8	0	42^{2}	17^{2}
Benfica	2006–07	Primeira Liga	24	6	3	3	–		14	4	41	13
Benfica	2007–08	Primeira Liga	25	7	3	1	0	0	8	1	36	9
Benfica	2008–09	Primeira Liga	24	7	1	0	2	1	6	1	33	9
Benfica	2009–10	Primeira Liga	13	3	2	0	2	0	6	1	23	4
Benfica	2010–11	Primeira Liga	6	4	1	0	1	1	0	0	8	5
Benfica	Total		193	65	23	7	5	2	53	15	275	90
Braga	2011–12	Primeira Liga	20	6	2	0	2	0	5	0	29	6
Blackburn Rovers	2012–13	Championship	18	4	2	0	0	0	–		20	4
Career total			464	172	49	24	7	2	87	28	609	227

^{1} includes appearance in Supercoppa Italiana
^{2} includes appearance and goal in Supertaça Cândido de Oliveira

=== International ===
Appearances and goals by national team and year
National team	Year	Apps	Goals
Portugal	1996	1	0
Portugal	1997	2	0
Portugal	1998	2	0
Portugal	1999	3	0
Portugal	2000	9	4
Portugal	2001	9	9
Portugal	2002	7	1
Portugal	2003	3	3
Portugal	2004	11	4
Portugal	2005	7	2
Portugal	2006	7	3
Portugal	2007	7	1
Portugal	2008	7	2
Portugal	2009	2	0
Portugal	2010	0	0
Portugal	2011	2	0
Total		79	29

Scores and results list Portugal's goal tally first, score column indicates score after each Gomes goal.

List of international goals scored by Nuno Gomes
No.	Date	Venue	Opponent	Score	Result	Competition
1	12 June 2000	Philips Stadion, Eindhoven, Netherlands	England	3–2	3–2	UEFA Euro 2000
2	24 June 2000	Amsterdam Arena, Amsterdam, Netherlands	Turkey	1–0	2–0	UEFA Euro 2000
3	24 June 2000	Amsterdam Arena, Amsterdam, Netherlands	Turkey	2–0	2–0	UEFA Euro 2000
4	28 June 2000	King Baudouin Stadium, Brussels, Belgium	France	1–0	1–2	UEFA Euro 2000
5	1 September 2001	Camp d'Esports, Lleida, Andorra	Andorra	1–0	7–1	2002 World Cup qualification
6	1 September 2001	Camp d'Esports, Lleida, Andorra	Andorra	3–0	7–1	2002 World Cup qualification
7	1 September 2001	Camp d'Esports, Lleida, Andorra	Andorra	5–1	7–1	2002 World Cup qualification
8	1 September 2001	Camp d'Esports, Lleida, Andorra	Andorra	7–1	7–1	2002 World Cup qualification
9	5 September 2001	Antonis Papadopoulos, Larnaca, Cyprus	Cyprus	1–1	3–1	2002 World Cup qualification
10	6 October 2001	Estádio da Luz (1954), Lisbon, Portugal	Estonia	2–0	5–0	2002 World Cup qualification
11	6 October 2001	Estádio da Luz (1954), Lisbon, Portugal	Estonia	4–0	5–0	2002 World Cup qualification
12	14 November 2001	Estádio José Alvalade (1956), Lisbon, Portugal	Angola	2–1	5–1	Friendly
13	14 November 2001	Estádio José Alvalade (1956), Lisbon, Portugal	Angola	4–1	5–1	Friendly
14	25 May 2002	Estádio Campo Desportivo, Macau, China	China	1–0	2–0	Friendly
15	19 November 2003	Estádio Dr. Magalhães Pessoa, Leiria, Portugal	Kuwait	6–0	8–0	Friendly
16	19 November 2003	Estádio Dr. Magalhães Pessoa, Leiria, Portugal	Kuwait	7–0	8–0	Friendly
17	19 November 2003	Estádio Dr. Magalhães Pessoa, Leiria, Portugal	Kuwait	8–0	8–0	Friendly
18	28 April 2004	Estádio Cidade de Coimbra, Coimbra, Portugal	Sweden	2–2	2–2	Friendly
19	29 May 2004	Estádio Municipal de Águeda, Águeda Municipality, Portugal	Luxembourg	2–0	3–0	Friendly
20	5 May 2004	Estádio do Bonfim, Setúbal, Portugal	Lithuania	3–1	4–1	Friendly
21	20 June 2004	Estádio José Alvalade, Lisbon, Portugal	Spain	1–0	1–0	UEFA Euro 2004
22	26 March 2005	Estádio Cidade de Barcelos, Barcelos Municipality, Portugal, Portugal	Canada	4–1	4–1	Friendly
23	8 October 2005	Estádio Municipal de Aveiro, Aveiro Municipality, Portugal	Liechtenstein	2–1	2–1	2006 World Cup qualification
24	8 July 2006	Gottlieb-Daimler-Stadion, Stuttgart, Germany	Germany	1–3	1–3	2006 FIFA World Cup
25	6 September 2006	Helsinki Olympic Stadium, Helsinki, Finland	Finland	1–1	1–1	Euro 2008 qualifying
26	11 October 2006	Stadion Śląski, Chorzów, Poland	Poland	1–2	1–2	Euro 2008 qualifying
27	24 March 2007	Estádio José Alvalade, Lisbon, Portugal	Belgium	1–0	4–0	Euro 2008 qualifying
28	26 March 2008	Esprit Arena, Düsseldorf, Germany	Greece	1–2	1–2	Friendly
29	19 June 2008	St. Jakob-Park, Basel, Switzerland	Germany	1–2	2–3	UEFA Euro 2008

== Honours ==
Boavista

- Taça de Portugal: 1996–97

Fiorentina

- Coppa Italia: 2000–01

Benfica

- Primeira Liga: 2004–05, 2009–10
- Taça de Portugal: 2003–04
- Taça da Liga: 2008–09, 2009–10, 2010–11
- Supertaça Cândido de Oliveira: 2005

Portugal

- UEFA European Championship runner-up: 2004; third-place: 2000
- UEFA European Under-18 Championship: 1994
- FIFA U-20 World Cup third place: 1995
- Toulon Tournament third place: 1996

Individual

- Primeira Liga Player of the Year: 1998–99, 1999–2000
- SJPF Player of the Month: September 2005, October 2005
- UEFA European Championship Team of the Tournament: 2000
- Toulon Tournament top scorer: 1996

Orders

- Medal of Merit, Order of the Immaculate Conception of Vila Viçosa (House of Braganza)
