= Paolo Vanoli =

Italian football manager (born 1972)

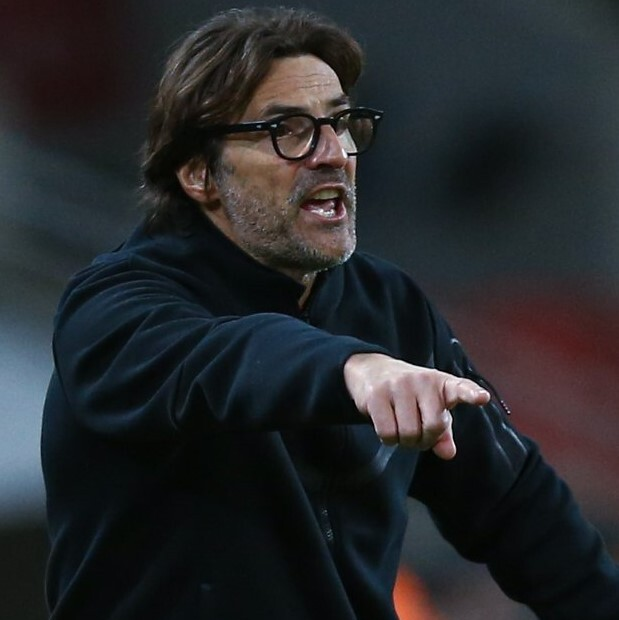
- Vanoli coaching Spartak Moscow in 2022

Personal information
- Date of birth: 12 August 1972 (age 54)
- Place of birth: Varese, Italy
- Height: 1.80 m (5 ft 11 in)
- Positions: Left back; left midfielder

Team information
- Current team: Fiorentina (head coach)

Youth career
- Oratorio Solbiate
- –1990: Varese

Senior career*
Years	Team	Apps	(Gls)
1990–1991	Varese	0	(0)
1991–1992	Bellinzago	28	(1)
1992–1993	Corsico	31	(3)
1993–1995	Venezia	56	(2)
1995–1998	Hellas Verona	84	(2)
1998–2000	Parma	43	(2)
2000–2002	Fiorentina	44	(1)
2002–2003	Bologna	21	(2)
2003–2005	Rangers	28	(1)
2005	Vicenza	17	(2)
2005–2006	Akratitos	4	(0)
2006–2007	Castelnuovo Sandrà		
Total		356	(16)

International career
1999–2000	Italy	2	(1)

Managerial career
- 2007–2009: Domegliara
- 2013: Italy U16
- 2013–2015: Italy U18
- 2015–2016: Italy U19
- 2021–2022: Spartak Moscow
- 2022–2024: Venezia
- 2024–2025: Torino
- 2025–2026: Fiorentina
- 2026–: Fiorentina
Medal record
Men's football
Representing Italy (as coach)
UEFA European Under-19 Championship
Runner-up	2016 Germany
- * Club domestic league appearances and goals

Paolo Vanoli (Italian pronunciation: [ˈpaːolo vaˈnɔːli]; born 12 August 1972) is an Italian professional football coach and former player who played as a left back or left midfielder. He is currently head coach of Serie A club Fiorentina.

== Club career ==
Vanoli played for many clubs, including Hellas Verona, Parma, and Fiorentina (for 9 billion lire fee in co-ownership deal; €4.648 million), having also two spells abroad: Scottish Premier League club Rangers from August 2003 to January 2005, scoring once against Dundee, and Akratitos in Greece (2005–06).

While at Parma, Vanoli won both the UEFA Cup and Coppa Italia in 1999, and then in 2001 won the Coppa Italia again with Fiorentina, this time beating his former team Parma in the final. Vanoli scored in all three finals.

== International career ==
Vanoli was also an Italian international, playing twice and scoring once on his debut in a 3–1 defeat against Belgium in 1999.

== Managerial career ==
Between 2016 and 2017, Vanoli was the assistant manager of the Italy national team. He was then appointed as assistant manager of Chelsea, serving in the role from 2017 to 2018.

On 17 December 2021, Vanoli joined Spartak Moscow as manager, signing a contract until the end of the 2022–23 season. On 29 May 2022, Spartak won the 2021–22 Russian Cup. The club announced on 9 June 2022 that Vanoli had left his post, citing a number of circumstances "beyond the club's control," in other words, the Russian Invasion of Ukraine, even though first in March he announced he would continue.

On 7 November 2022, Vanoli was hired as the new head coach of Serie B struggling club Venezia, signing a contract until 30 June 2024. In his second season in charge, Vanoli guided Venezia to Serie A promotion after defeating Cremonese in a two-legged playoff. On 20 June 2024, Vanoli and Venezia parted ways by mutual consent.

On 21 June 2024, Vanoli signed a two-year contract with Serie A club Torino. Vanoli saw the club to an 11th-place league finish in the 2024–25 season. He was dismissed as head coach on 5 June 2025.

On 7 November 2025, Vanoli was hired by Serie A club Fiorentina on an initial one-year contract, with the option of a further year. He departed the club at the conclusion of the 2025–26 season. On 7 September 2026, he was reappointed as head coach of the club following the dismissal of Fabio Grosso.

== Personal life ==
Vanoli has an older brother, Rodolfo, who is also a former footballer and current coach.

== Career statistics ==
Appearances and goals by national team and year
National team	Year	Apps	Goals
Italy	1999	1	1
Italy	2000	1	0
Total		2	1

Colombia score listed first, score column indicates score after each Vanoli goal.

International goals by date, venue, cap, opponent, score, result and competition
No.	Date	Venue	Cap	Opponent	Score	Result	Competition
1	13 November 1999	Stadio Via del mare, Lecce, Italy	1	Belgium	1–1	1–3	Friendly

== Managerial record ==
As of 8 November 2026

Managerial record by team and tenure
Team	From	To	Record							
Team	From	To	G	W	D	L	GF	GA	GD	Win %
Italy U18	1 August 2013	31 July 2015	13	11	0	2	28	8	+20	84.62
Italy U19	1 August 2015	31 July 2016	18	10	7	1	32	18	+14	55.56
(Russia) Spartak Moscow	17 December 2021	29 May 2022	16	8	3	5	29	17	+12	50.00
(Italy) Venezia	7 November 2022	20 June 2024	70	35	16	19	115	82	+33	50.00
(Italy) Torino	21 June 2024	5 June 2025	40	11	14	15	42	47	−5	27.50
(Italy) Fiorentina	7 November 2025	5 June 2026	38	14	11	13	48	50	−2	36.84
(Italy) Fiorentina	7 September 2026	current	9	3	3	3	19	16	+3	33.33
Total			204	92	54	58	313	238	+75	45.10

== Honours ==
=== Player ===
Varese

- Serie C2: 1989-90

Parma

- UEFA Cup: 1998–99
- Coppa Italia: 1998–99
- Supercoppa Italiana: 1999

Fiorentina

- Coppa Italia: 2000–01

=== Coach ===
Italy U19

- UEFA European Under-19 Championship runner-up: 2016

Spartak Moscow

- Russian Cup: 2021–22

Venezia

- Serie B: Playoff Final winners 2024

Individual

- Serie A Coach of the Month: August 2024
