= 2000–01 Coppa Italia =

Tournament details
- Country: Italy
- Dates: 13 Aug 2000 – 13 June 2001
- Teams: 48

Final positions
- Champions: Fiorentina (6th title)
- Runners-up: Parma

Tournament statistics
- Matches played: 94
- Goals scored: 263 (2.8 per match)
- Top goal scorer: Stefan Schwoch (8 goals)

The 2000–01 Coppa Italia was the 54th edition of the tournament. The tournament was won by Fiorentina, for their 6th title, also qualifying for the UEFA Cup in the progress. It was Fiorentina's second title in recent years, having also won the 1995–96 edition of the tournament. Fiorentina defeated Parma in the two-legged final on an aggregate score of 2–1.

== Seedings and format ==
In the 2000–01 season, Coppa Italia featured 48 teams competing: all 18 clubs from Serie A, all 20 clubs from Serie B, the 4 clubs relegated from Serie B in the 1999–00 season, the 4 playoff runners-up from the 1999–00 Serie C1 season, and the 2 finalists of the 1999–00 Serie C Coppa Italia competition.

The format for pairings were:

- Group Stage: one-leg fixtures
  - First round: The 32 non-seeded clubs were divided into 8 groups of 4 teams each. Each team played the other three from its group once and the top team from each group advanced to the second round.
    - Points were awarded as 3 points for a win, 1 point for a draw, and 0 points for loss. In the event of a tie at the conclusion of this stage, the group goes to the team with the best goal difference in the match, otherwise the best overall goal difference.
- Knockout Rounds: two-leg fixtures
  - Second round: Clubs 9–14 from Serie A and the top two clubs from Serie B were paired against the 8 advancing teams from the group stage.
  - Round of 16: Teams 1–8 from Serie A were paired against the 8 winners of the second round
  - Quarterfinals, Semifinals and Finals: Two-leg fixtures with pairings based upon bracket

=== Group 1 ===
Pos	Team	Pld	W	D	L	GF	GA	GD	Pts
1	Piacenza (B)	3	3	0	0	7	1	+6	9
2	Chievo (B)	3	2	0	1	6	6	0	6
3	Monza (B)	3	0	1	2	2	4	−2	1
4	Viterbese (C)	3	0	1	2	3	7	−4	1

Team #1	Team #2	Result
Monza	Piacenza	0–1
Viterbese	Chievo	2–3
Chievo	Monza	2–1
Piacenza	Viterbese	3–0
Chievo	Piacenza	1–3
Monza	Viterbese	1–1

=== Group 2 ===
Pos	Team	Pld	W	D	L	GF	GA	GD	Pts
1	Sampdoria (B)	3	3	0	0	8	4	+4	9
2	Empoli (B)	3	1	1	1	8	7	+1	4
3	Fermana (C)	3	1	1	1	3	4	−1	4
4	Crotone (B)	3	0	0	3	2	6	−4	0

Team #1	Team #2	Result
Crotone	Empoli	1–3
Fermana	Sampdoria	0–2
Empoli	Fermana	2–2
Sampdoria	Crotone	2–1
Crotone	Fermana	0–1
Sampdoria	Empoli	4–3

=== Group 3 ===
Pos	Team	Pld	W	D	L	GF	GA	GD	Pts
1	Atalanta (A)	3	2	1	0	5	2	+3	7
2	Pistoiese (B)	3	1	1	1	4	6	−2	4
3	Ravenna (B)	3	1	0	2	5	5	0	3
4	Avellino (C)	3	1	0	2	7	8	−1	3

Team #1	Team #2	Result
Avellino	Atalanta	1–3
Ravenna	Pistoiese	1–2
Atalanta	Ravenna	1–0
Pistoiese	Avellino	1–4
Atalanta	Pistoiese	1–1
Ravenna	Avellino	4–2

=== Group 4 ===
Pos	Team	Pld	W	D	L	GF	GA	GD	Pts
1	Salernitana (B)	3	3	0	0	4	1	+3	9
2	Cagliari (B)	3	1	1	1	6	4	+2	4
3	Ascoli (C)	3	0	2	1	3	4	−1	2
4	Cittadella (B)	3	0	1	2	1	5	−4	1

Team #1	Team #2	Result
Ascoli	Cittadella	1–1
Salernitana	Cagliari	2–1
Cagliari	Ascoli	2–2
Cittadella	Salernitana	0–1
Cittadella	Cagliari	0–3
Salernitana	Ascoli	1–0

=== Group 5 ===
Pos	Team	Pld	W	D	L	GF	GA	GD	Pts
1	Torino (B)	3	2	1	0	8	4	+4	7
2	Ternana (B)	3	1	2	0	5	4	+1	5
3	Varese (C)	3	1	0	2	2	5	−3	3
4	Cesena (C)	3	0	1	2	3	5	−2	1

Team #1	Team #2	Result
Cesena	Ternana	1–1
Varese	Torino	0–3
Ternana	Varese	1–0
Torino	Cesena	2–1
Cesena	Varese	1–2
Torino	Ternana	3–3

=== Group 6 ===
Pos	Team	Pld	W	D	L	GF	GA	GD	Pts
1	Venezia (B)	3	2	1	0	4	2	+2	7
2	Pescara (B)	3	1	2	0	7	6	+1	5
3	Savoia (C)	3	1	0	2	5	6	−1	3
4	Siena (B)	3	0	1	2	2	4	−2	1

Team #1	Team #2	Result
Pescara	Venezia	1–1
Savoia	Siena	1–0
Siena	Pescara	2–2
Venezia	Savoia	2–1
Savoia	Pescara	3–4
Venezia	Siena	1–0

=== Group 7 ===
Pos	Team	Pld	W	D	L	GF	GA	GD	Pts
1	Cosenza (B)	3	2	1	0	3	0	+3	7
2	Genoa (B)	3	1	1	1	4	4	0	4
3	Ancona (B)	3	1	0	2	2	4	−2	3
4	Pisa (C)	3	0	2	1	3	4	−1	2

Team #1	Team #2	Result
Genoa	Ancona	2–0
Pisa	Cosenza	0–0
Ancona	Pisa	2–1
Cosenza	Genoa	2–0
Ancona	Cosenza	0–1
Pisa	Genoa	2–2

=== Group 8 ===
Pos	Team	Pld	W	D	L	GF	GA	GD	Pts
1	Brescia (A)	3	2	0	1	3	2	+1	6
2	AlzanoCene (C)	3	1	1	1	4	4	0	4
3	Brescello (C)	3	1	1	1	2	1	+1	4
4	Treviso (B)	3	1	0	2	2	3	−1	3

Team #1	Team #2	Result
AlzanoCene	Brescello	1–1
Brescia	Treviso	1–0
Brescello	Brescia	0–1
Treviso	AlzanoCene	2–1
Brescello	Treviso	1–0
Brescia	AlzanoCene	1–2

== Knockout stage ==
Round of 32
Sampdoria	1	0	1
Napoli	0	0	0
Lazio
bye
Piacenza	2	2	4
Hellas Verona	1	2	3
Udinese
bye
Venezia	2	1	3
Bologna	2	0	2
Parma
bye
Internazionale
bye
Cosenza	0	1	1
Lecce	2	1	3
Torino	2	0	2
Bari	1	0	1
Milan
bye
Roma
bye
Atalanta	2	1	3
Reggina	0	0	0
Salernitana	1	1	2
Perugia	0	2	2
Fiorentina
bye
Brescia	2	1	3(5p)
Vicenza	1	2	3(4p)
Juventus
bye

Round of 16
Sampdoria	1	2	3
Lazio	1	5	6
Piacenza	1	1	2
Udinese	1	2	3
Venezia	1	1	2
Parma	1	5	6
Internazionale	1	3	4
Lecce	1	1	2
Torino	1	1	2
Milan	3	0	3
Roma	1	2	3
Atalanta	1	4	5
Salernitana	0	1	1
Fiorentina	5	3	8
Brescia	0	2	2
Juventus	0	1	1

Quarter-finals
Lazio	2	1	3
Udinese	1	4	5
Parma	6	0	6
Internazionale	1	0	1
Milan	4	1	5
Atalanta	2	2	4
Fiorentina	6	1	7
Brescia	0	3	3

Semi-finals
Udinese	2	0	2
Parma	1	1	2
Milan	2	0	2
Fiorentina	2	2	4

Finals
Parma	0	1	1
Fiorentina	1	1	2

== Final ==
=== First leg ===
24 May 2001
21:00

Parma	0–1	Fiorentina
		Vanoli 87'

Stadio Ennio Tardini, Parma
Attendance: 17,685
Referee: Gennaro Borriello

=== Second leg ===
13 June 2001
21:00

Fiorentina	1–1	Parma
Nuno Gomes 65'		Milošević 18'

Stadio Artemio Franchi, Florence
Attendance: 37,664
Referee: Massimo De Santis

Fiorentina won 2–1 on aggregate.

== Top goalscorers ==
Rank	Player	Club	Goals
1	(Italy) Stefan Schwoch	Torino	8
2	(Italy) Dario Hübner	Brescia	7
3	(Italy) Enrico Chiesa	Fiorentina	5
3	(Italy) Massimo Margiotta	Udinese	5
5	(Italy) Maurizio Ganz	Atalanta	4
5	(Brazil) Márcio Amoroso	Parma	4
5	(Portugal) Nuno Gomes	Fiorentina	4
5	(Federal Republic of Yugoslavia) Zoran Jovičić	Sampdoria	4
