= 2001–02 AC Fiorentina season =

Fiorentina
2001–02 season
- President: Vittorio Cecchi Gori
- Manager: Roberto Mancini (until 7 January 2002); Luciano Chiarugi (until 14 January 2002); Ottavio Bianchi (until 31 March 2002); Luciano Chiarugi
- Stadium: Artemio Franchi
- Serie A: 17th
- Supercoppa Italiana: Runners-up
- Coppa Italia: Second round
- UEFA Cup: Third round
- Top goalscorer: League: Adriano (6 goals); All: Adriano; Enrico Chiesa; Nuno Gomes (6 each)
- Average home league attendance: 18,835
Home colours	Away colours	Third colours

During the 2001–02 season, Fiorentina competed in the Serie A, Coppa Italia and UEFA Cup.

== Summary ==
Associazione Calcio Fiorentina endured a nightmare season, which proved to be the last for the initial club. The economy was in tatters, and despite the €40 million sale of playmaker Rui Costa, the financial problems just got worse as the season lingered on. Without Rui Costa and vital goalkeeper Francesco Toldo, the remainder of the Fiorentina squad was exposed when striker Enrico Chiesa ruptured his cruciate ligament in the fifth league game of the season.

The ageing defenders had no chance against the strikers of the opposing teams, and the off-pitch trouble clearly affected the performance of some well-known players including Domenico Morfeo and Nuno Gomes. Not even superstarlet Adriano, loaned in from Inter, could save the team, even though the Brazilian scored six goals.

Manager Roberto Mancini was sacked, before joining Lazio and turning his managerial career around. The club was relegated, and filed for bankruptcy in the summer, ensuring the club had to restart in Serie C2 as Florentia Viola. All players bar veteran Angelo Di Livio departed the club, and the remainder of the club was just in ashes.

Despite the weak performance of the club, several of its players were hired by illustrious clubs, including:

- Emiliano Moretti (Juventus)
- Enrico Chiesa (Lazio)
- Roberto Baronio (Lazio)
- Nuno Gomes (Benfica)
- Domenico Morfeo (Inter)
- Daniele Adani (Inter)
- Moreno Torricelli (Espanyol)
- Paolo Vanoli (Bologna)

== Kit ==
Supplier: Mizuno / Sponsor: Toyota

Home	Away	Away Alt.	Third

== Players ==
Note: Flags indicate national team as defined under FIFA eligibility rules; some limited exceptions apply. Players may hold more than one non-FIFA nationality.

No.	Pos.	Nation	Player
1	GK	ITA	Giuseppe Taglialatela
12	GK	ITA	Mario Cassano
30	GK	AUT	Alex Manninger
3	DF	ITA	Moreno Torricelli
4	DF	ITA	Daniele Adani
13	DF	ITA	Emiliano Moretti
15	DF	ITA	Alessandro Agostini
23	DF	ITA	Alessandro Pierini
27	DF	ITA	Andrea Tarozzi
29	DF	ITA	Luca Ceccarelli
38	DF	ITA	Giovanni Bartolucci
76	DF	ITA	Paolo Vanoli
5	MF	ITA	Sandro Cois
6	MF	BRA	Amaral
7	MF	ITA	Angelo Di Livio
10	MF	ITA	Domenico Morfeo

No.	Pos.	Nation	Player
11	MF	ITA	Fabio Rossitto
14	MF	ITA	Mirco Benin
16	MF	ITA	Roberto Massaro
17	MF	ARG	Ezequiel González
18	MF	ITA	Riccardo Taddei
19	MF	ITA	Marco Rossi
24	MF	ITA	Christian Amoroso
25	MF	ITA	Angelo Palombo
77	MF	ITA	Roberto Baronio
28	MF	ITA	Orlando Fanasca
8	FW	YUG	Predrag Mijatović
20	FW	ITA	Enrico Chiesa
21	FW	POR	Nuno Gomes
55	FW	ITA	Maurizio Ganz
75	FW	ITA	Anselmo Robbiati
78	FW	BRA	Adriano

=== Transfers ===
In
Pos.	Name	from	Type
GK	Alex Manninger	Arsenal	loan
DF	Alessandro Agostini	Ternana	loan ended
MF	Mirko Benin	Ternana	
MF	Ezequiel González	Rosario Central	
MF	Roberto Baronio	Lazio	loan
MF	Orlando Fanasca		
FW	Maurizio Ganz	AC Milan	
FW	Anselmo Robbiati	Internazionale	loan

Out
Pos.	Name	To	Type
MF	Rui Costa	AC Milan	
GK	Francesco Toldo	Internazionale	
DF	Tomas Repka	West Ham United	
MF	Mauro Bressan	Venezia	
DF	Saliou Lassissi	Parma	loan ended
DF	Aldo Firicano	Salernitana	

==== Winter ====
In
Pos.	Name	from	Type
FW	Adriano	Internazionale	loan

Out
Pos.	Name	To	Type
MF	Leandro Amaral	Sao Paulo	

== Competitions ==
=== Supercoppa Italiana ===
19 August 2001	Roma	3–0	Fiorentina	Rome
20:45 CEST (UTC+02:00)	Candela 6'; Montella 53'; Totti 83'			Stadium: Stadio Olimpico; Attendance: 61,050; Referee: Graziano Cesari

=== Serie A ===
==== League table ====
Pos	Team	Pld	W	D	L	GF	GA	GD	Pts	Qualification or relegation
14	Udinese	34	11	7	16	41	52	−11	40 (Note: Brescia finished ahead of Udinese on head-to-head goal difference: Brescia 2–0 Udinese, Udinese 3–2 Brescia.)	
15	Hellas Verona (R)	34	11	6	17	41	53	−12	39	Relegation to Serie B
16	Lecce (R)	34	6	10	18	36	56	−20	28	Relegation to Serie B
17	Fiorentina (Note: Fiorentina was denied entry to the 2002–03 Serie B season, having entered administration. It was later admitted to the Lega Professionisti Serie C after bankruptcy.) (R, E, R)	34	5	7	22	29	63	−34	22	Phoenix in Serie C2
18	Venezia (R)	34	3	9	22	30	61	−31	18	Relegation to Serie B

Source: 2001–02 Serie A, Soccerway
Rules for classification: 1) Points; 2) Head-to-head points; 3) Head-to-head goal difference; 4) Goal difference; 5) Goals scored; 6) Draw. (Note: Head-to-head record is used only after all the matches between the teams in question have been played).
(E) Eliminated; (R) Relegated

==== Results summary ====
Overall								Home						Away					
Pld	W	D	L	GF	GA	GD	Pts	W	D	L	GF	GA	GD	W	D	L	GF	GA	GD
34	5	7	22	29	63	−34	22	3	6	8	16	23	−7	2	1	14	13	40	−27

Last updated: 30 December 2015.
Source: Competitive matches

==== Results by round ====
Round	1	2	3	4	5	6	7	8	9	10	11	12	13	14	15	16	17	18	19	20	21	22	23	24	25	26	27	28	29	30	31	32	33	34
Ground	H	A	H	A	H	A	H	A	H	A	H	A	A	H	H	A	H	A	H	A	H	A	A	H	A	H	A	H	A	H	H	A	H	A
Result	L	L	W	L	W	L	L	W	L	D	L	L	L	W	D	L	L	D	D	L	D	L	L	L	W	D	D	L	L	L	L	L	L	L
Position	15	16	10	13	9	13	14	9	12	14	15	16	17	15	15	16	17	17	17	17	17	17	17	17	17	17	17	17	17	17	17	17	17	17

Source: Competitive matches
A = Away; H = Home; W = Win; D = Draw; L = Loss; = Leader, 2002–03 UEFA Champions League Group stage; = 2002–03 UEFA Champions League Group stage; = 2002–03 UEFA Champions League Second qualifying round; = 2002–03 UEFA Cup First round; = 2002–03 Serie B

==== Matches ====
26 August 2001 1	Fiorentina	0–2	Chievo	Florence
			Perrotta 6'; Marazzina 55'	Stadium: Stadio Artemio Franchi

2 September 2001 2	Milan	5–2	Fiorentina	Milan
	Shevchenko 16', 52'; Laursen 40'; Inzaghi 45'; Serginho 78'		Chiesa 18', 58'	Stadium: San Siro

16 September 2001 3	Fiorentina	3–1	Atalanta	Florence
	Nuno Gomes 2'; Chiesa 12', 82'		Rinaldi 3'	Stadium: Stadio Artemio Franchi

22 September 2001 4	Roma	2–1	Fiorentina	Rome
	Totti 12'; Panucci 87'		Adani 8'	Stadium: Stadio Olimpico

30 September 2001 5	Fiorentina	3–1	Venezia	Florence
	Chiesa 5'; Nuno Gomes 21', 87'		Maniero 84'	Stadium: Stadio Artemio Franchi

7 October 2001 6	Lecce	4–1	Fiorentina	Lecce
	Vugrinec 2', 90'; Giacomazzi 11'; Chevantón 90+'		Mijatović 12'	Stadium: Stadio Via del Mare

21 October 2001 7	Fiorentina	0–2	Hellas Verona	Florence
			Oddo 43' (pen.); Mutu 57'	Stadium: Stadio Artemio Franchi

28 October 2001 8	Udinese	1–2	Fiorentina	Udine
	Muzzi 32' (pen.)		C. Amoroso 73'; Baronio 84'	Stadium: Stadio Friuli

4 November 2001 9	Bologna	3–2	Fiorentina	Bologna
	Fresi 13', 18'; Zauli 33'		Ganz 16'; Vanoli 26'	Stadium: Stadio Renato Dall'Ara

11 November 2001 10	Fiorentina	0–0	Torino	Florence
				Stadium: Stadio Artemio Franchi

25 November 2001 11	Internazionale	2–0	Fiorentina	Milan
	Kallon 43'; Vieri 55' (pen.)			Stadium: Stadio San Siro

2 December 2001 12	Fiorentina	1–3	Piacenza	Florence
	Benin 77'		Poggi 1'; Hübner 84'; Statuto 88'	Stadium: Stadio Artemio Franchi

8 December 2001 13	Lazio	3–0	Fiorentina	Rome
	Poborský 12'; Crespo 59'; C. López 86'			Stadium: Stadio Olimpico

16 December 2001 14	Fiorentina	1–0	Brescia	Florence
	Ganz 90'			Stadium: Stadio Artemio Franchi

19 December 2001 15	Fiorentina	1–1	Juventus	Florence
	Nuno Gomes 79'		Trezeguet 57'	Stadium: Stadio Artemio Franchi

23 December 2001 16	Parma	2–0	Fiorentina	Parma
	Bonazzoli 71'; Di Vaio 82'			Stadium: Stadio Ennio Tardini

6 January 2002 17	Fiorentina	1–3	Perugia	Florence
	Adani 8'		Vryzas 38'; Di Loreto 51'; Grosso 75'	Stadium: Stadio Artemio Franchi

13 January 2002 18	Chievo	2–2	Fiorentina	Verona
	Corini 46' (pen.); D'Anna 86'		Nuno Gomes 12'; Adriano 89'	Stadium: Stadio Marc'Antonio Bentegodi

20 January 2002 19	Fiorentina	1–1	Milan	Florence
	Adriano 90'		José Mari 52'	Stadium: Stadio Artemio Franchi

27 January 2002 20	Atalanta	2–0	Fiorentina	Bergamo
	Pià 35'; Doni 75'			Stadium: Stadio Atleti Azzurri d'Italia

3 February 2002 21	Fiorentina	2–2	Roma	Florence
	Morfeo 16'; Adriano 18'		Cassano 54'; Emerson 90'	Stadium: Stadio Artemio Franchi

10 February 2002 22	Venezia	2–0	Fiorentina	Venice
	Magallanes 17'; Maniero 54'			Stadium: Stadio Pier Luigi Penzo

16 February 2002 23	Juventus	2–1	Fiorentina	Turin
	Trezeguet 12'; Del Piero 30'		Adriano 15'	Stadium: Stadio delle Alpi

24 February 2002 24	Fiorentina	1–2	Lecce	Florence
	Di Livio 42'		Vugrinec 45'; Chevantón 82'	Stadium: Stadio Artemio Franchi

3 March 2002 25	Hellas Verona	1–2	Fiorentina	Verona
	Mutu 86'		Morfeo 26'; Adriano 82'	Stadium: Stadio Marc'Antonio Bentegodi

10 March 2002 26	Fiorentina	0–0	Udinese	Florence
				Stadium: Stadio Artemio Franchi

17 March 2002 27	Fiorentina	1–1	Bologna	Florence
	González 45'		Cruz 60'	Stadium: Stadio Artemio Franchi

24 March 2002 28	Torino	1–0	Fiorentina	Turin
	Scarchilli 24'			Stadium: Stadio delle Alpi

30 March 2002 29	Fiorentina	0–1	Internazionale	Florence
			Vieri 61'	Stadium: Stadio Artemio Franchi

7 April 2002 30	Piacenza	3–0	Fiorentina	Piacenza
	Matuzalém 24'; Volpi 40'; Hübner 45'			Stadium: Stadio Leonardo Garilli

14 April 2002 31	Fiorentina	0–1	Lazio	Florence
			Castromán 24'	Stadium: Stadio Artemio Franchi

21 April 2002 32	Brescia	3–0	Fiorentina	Brescia
	Toni 35'; R. Baggio 74', 88'			Stadium: Stadio Mario Rigamonti

28 April 2002 33	Fiorentina	1–2	Parma	Florence
	Adriano 4'		Di Vaio 81', 90'	Stadium: Stadio Artemio Franchi

5 May 2002 34	Perugia	2–0	Fiorentina	Perugia
	Bazzani 9'; Zé Maria 29'			Stadium: Stadio Renato Curi

=== Coppa Italia ===
==== Second stage ====
26 September 2001	Como	2–0	Fiorentina	Como
17.00	L. Oliveira 28'; Pedone 61'			Stadium: Stadio Giuseppe Sinigaglia; Referee: Preschern

31 October 2001	Fiorentina	0–2	Como	Florence
20.45			43' L. Oliveira; 78' Taldo	Stadium: Stadio Artemio Franchi; Referee: Rossi

=== UEFA Cup ===
==== First round ====
20 September 2001 First leg	Dnipro Dnipropetrovsk (Ukraine)	0–0	(Italy) Fiorentina	Dnipropetrovsk, Ukraine
18:00 CEST (UTC+02:00)	Shelayev (yellow card) 29'; Shershun (yellow card) 60'; Mazyar (yellow card) 90'	Report	Cois (yellow card) 14'; González (yellow card) 81'	Stadium: Meteor Stadium; Referee: Philippe Leuba (Switzerland)

4 October 2001 Second leg	Fiorentina (Italy)	2–1 (2–1 agg.)	(Ukraine) Dnipro Dnipropetrovsk	Florence, Italy
21:00 CEST (UTC+02:00)	Chiesa (yellow card) 45', (goal) 76'; Adani 75'	Report	Slabyshev 88'	Stadium: Stadio Artemio Franchi; Referee: Graham Barber (England)

==== Second round ====
25 October 2001 First leg	Fiorentina (Italy)	2–0	(Austria) Tirol Innsbruck	Florence, Italy
20:45 CEST (UTC+02:00)	Morfeo 47'; Nuno Gomes 86'	Report		Stadium: Stadio Artemio Franchi; Referee: Martin Ingvarsson (Sweden)

8 November 2001 Second leg	Tirol Innsbruck (Austria)	2–2 (2–4 agg.)	(Italy) Fiorentina	Innsbruck, Austria
20:30 CET (UTC+01:00)	Gilewicz 25', 75'; Kogler (yellow card) 40'	Report	Nuno Gomes 26'; Morfeo 41'	Stadium: Tivoli Neu; Referee: Georgios Douros (Greece)

==== Third round ====
29 November 2001 First leg	Fiorentina (Italy)	0–1	(France) Lille	Florence, Italy
20:45 CET (UTC+01:00)	Agostini (yellow card) 54'; Baronio (yellow card) 77'	Report	Bakari 24'; Bassir (yellow card) 55'	Stadium: Stadio Artemio Franchi; Referee: Manuel Mejuto González (Spain)

13 December 2001 Second leg	Lille (France)	2–0 (3–0 agg.)	(Italy) Fiorentina	Lille, France
19:00 CET (UTC+01:00)	Cheyrou 32'; Sterjovski 78'	Report	Amoroso (yellow card) 62'; Tarozzi (yellow card) 75'; Benin (yellow card) 80'	Stadium: Stade Grimonprez-Jooris; Referee: Herbert Fandel (Germany)

== Statistics ==
=== Goalscorers ===
- (Brazil) Adriano 6
- (Italy) Enrico Chiesa 5
- (Portugal) Nuno Gomes 4
