= 1999–2000 AC Fiorentina season =

Fiorentina
1999–2000 season
- President: Vittorio Cecchi Gori
- Manager: Giovanni Trapattoni
- Stadium: Artemio Franchi
- Serie A: 7th
- Coppa Italia: Quarter-finals
- UEFA Champions League: Second group stage
- Top goalscorer: League: Gabriel Batistuta (23); All: Gabriel Batistuta (29)
Home colours	Away colours	Third colours

Associazione Calcio Fiorentina did not manage to repeat its near-miss season from 1998–99, and instead missed out on qualification to the Champions League, following an inconsistent season. Its topscorer Gabriel Batistuta finally gave up on clinching the Serie A title with Fiorentina, and switched to Roma in the summer, a move which was greeted with controversy since Roma had only finished sixth in the 1999–2000 season.

Fiorentina came close to advancing to the quarter-finals of the Champions League, but ultimately a draw at home against Bordeaux ensured that home wins against Manchester United and Valencia were not enough.

== Players ==
Note: Flags indicate national team as defined under FIFA eligibility rules; some limited exceptions apply. Players may hold more than one non-FIFA nationality.

No.	Pos.	Nation	Player
1	GK	ITA	Francesco Toldo
2	DF	CZE	Tomáš Řepka
3	DF	ITA	Moreno Torricelli
4	DF	ITA	Daniele Adani
5	DF	ITA	Pasquale Padalino
6	DF	ITA	Aldo Firicano
7	MF	ESP	Guillermo Amor
8	FW	YUG	Predrag Mijatović
9	FW	ARG	Gabriel Batistuta
10	MF	POR	Rui Costa
11	MF	ITA	Fabio Rossitto
12	GK	ITA	Giuseppe Taglialatela
13	MF	ITA	Luigi Pagliuca

No.	Pos.	Nation	Player
14	MF	ITA	Sandro Cois
15	MF	AUS	Paul Okon
16	MF	ITA	Angelo Di Livio
17	MF	GER	Jörg Heinrich
18	FW	ARG	Abel Balbo
19	MF	ITA	Christian Amoroso
20	FW	ITA	Enrico Chiesa
21	MF	ITA	Mauro Bressan
22	GK	ITA	Gianmatteo Mareggini
23	DF	ITA	Alessandro Pierini
25	FW	BEL	Luís Oliveira
25	FW	GRE	Georgios Vakouftsis
27	DF	ITA	Andrea Tarozzi
31	FW	ITA	Riccardo Taddei

=== Transfers ===
In
Pos.	Name	from	Type
FW	Enrico Chiesa	Parma	€14.46 million
MF	Angelo Di Livio	Juventus	
FW	Abel Balbo	Parma	
FW	Predrag Mijatović	Real Madrid	
DF	Stefano Bettarini	Bologna	loan ended
MF	Fabio Rossitto	Napoli	
GK	Giuseppe Taglialatela	Napoli	€2.582 million
DF	Daniele Adani	Brescia	
DF	Mauro Bressan	Bari	
MF	Paul Okon	Lazio	
FW	Riccardo Taddei	Pontedera	
MF	Luigi Pagliuca	Youth squad	

Out
Pos.	Name	To	Type
FW	Edmundo	Vasco da Gama	
FW	Francesco Flachi	Sampdoria	
FW	Anselmo Robbiati	Napoli	
MF	Domenico Morfeo	Cagliari	loan
DF	Giulio Falcone	Bologna	
FW	Carmine Esposito	Sampdoria	
DF	Roberto Mirri	Empoli	
DF	Lorenzo Collacchioni	Pisa	
MF	Emiliano Bigica		
DF	Stefano Bettarini	Venezia	

==== Winter ====
In
Pos.	Name	from	Type

Out
Pos.	Name	To	Type
FW	Luis Airton Oliveira	Cagliari	

== Competitions ==
=== Serie A ===
==== League table ====
Pos	Team	Pld	W	D	L	GF	GA	GD	Pts	Qualification or relegation
5	Parma	34	16	10	8	52	37	+15	58	Qualification to UEFA Cup first round
6	Roma	34	14	12	8	57	34	+23	54	Qualification to UEFA Cup first round
7	Fiorentina (Note: Fiorentina gained entry to the 2000–01 UEFA Cup as both 1999–2000 Coppa Italia finalists had qualified for the 2000–01 UEFA Champions League.)	34	13	12	9	48	38	+10	51	Qualification to UEFA Cup first round
8	Udinese	34	13	11	10	55	45	+10	50	Qualification to Intertoto Cup third round
9	Hellas Verona	34	10	13	11	40	45	−5	43	

Source: Serie A, RSSSF.com, Soccerway
Rules for classification: 1) Points; 2) Head-to-head points; 3) Head-to-head goal difference; 4) Goal difference; 5) Goals scored; 6) Draw. (Note: Head-to-head record is used only after all the matches between the teams in question have been played).

==== Results summary ====
Overall								Home						Away					
Pld	W	D	L	GF	GA	GD	Pts	W	D	L	GF	GA	GD	W	D	L	GF	GA	GD
34	13	12	9	48	38	+10	51	10	5	2	30	17	+13	3	7	7	18	21	−3

Last updated: 25 July 2015.
Source: Competitive matches

==== Results by round ====
Round	1	2	3	4	5	6	7	8	9	10	11	12	13	14	15	16	17	18	19	20	21	22	23	24	25	26	27	28	29	30	31	32	33	34
Ground	H	A	H	A	H	H	A	H	A	A	H	A	H	H	A	H	A	A	H	A	H	A	A	H	A	H	H	A	H	A	A	H	A	H
Result	W	D	W	D	L	L	L	D	D	W	D	W	L	D	D	W	L	L	W	D	D	L	W	W	L	W	W	D	D	D	L	W	W	W
Position	3	4	2	4	6	6	11	12	12	10	10	8	9	10	10	9	11	12	11	9	8	10	8	8	8	8	8	8	8	8	8	8	8	7

Source: Competitive matches
A = Away; H = Home; W = Win; D = Draw; L = Loss; = Leader, UEFA Champions League Groups stage; = UEFA Champions League Groups stage; = UEFA Champions League Qualifying round; = 2000–01 UEFA Cup; = 2000 UEFA Intertoto Cup; = 2000–01 Serie B

==== Matches ====
29 August 1999 1	Fiorentina	1–0	Bari	Florence
	Chiesa 48'	Report		Stadium: Stadio Artemio Franchi; Attendance: 35,000; Referee: Livio Bazzoli

11 September 1999 2	Reggina	2–2	Fiorentina	Reggio Calabria
	Kallon 18' (pen.); Reggi 86'	Report	Firicano 33'; Heinrich 41'	Stadium: Stadio Oreste Granillo; Attendance: 24,696; Referee: Graziano Cesari

19 September 1999 3	Fiorentina	4–1	Hellas Verona	Florence
	Batistuta 17', 32', 81'; Chiesa 47'	Report	Melis 69'	Stadium: Stadio Artemio Franchi; Attendance: 36,000; Referee: Alfredo Trentalange

26 September 1999 4	Udinese	1–1	Fiorentina	Udine
	Fiore 53'	Report	Batistuta 8'	Stadium: Stadio Friuli; Attendance: 18,000; Referee: Pasquale Rodomonti

3 October 1999 5	Fiorentina	1–3	Roma	Florence
	Batistuta 75'	Report	Cafu 17', 67'; Tommasi 59'	Stadium: Stadio Artemio Franchi; Attendance: 35,000; Referee: Domenico Messina

16 October 1999 6	Fiorentina	0–2	Parma	Florence
		Report	Di Vaio 83'; Boghossian 90+6'	Stadium: Stadio Artemio Franchi; Attendance: 32,000; Referee: Daniele Tombolini

24 October 1999 7	Piacenza	2–0	Fiorentina	Piacenza
	Cristallini 83'; Di Napoli 88' (pen.)	Report		Stadium: Stadio Leonardo Garilli; Attendance: 10,000; Referee: Diego Preschern

30 October 1999 8	Fiorentina	1–1	Torino	Florence
	Balbo 89'	Report	Sommense 34'	Stadium: Stadio Artemio Franchi; Attendance: 34,000; Referee: Emilio Pellegrino

6 November 1999 9	Cagliari	1–1	Fiorentina	Cagliari
	Mboma 54' (pen.)	Report	Di Livio 10'	Stadium: Stadio Sant'Elia; Attendance: 18,000; Referee: Gennaro Borriello

20 November 1999 10	Fiorentina	1–0	Perugia	Florence
	Pierini 81'	Report		Stadium: Stadio Artemio Franchi; Attendance: 25,000; Referee: Fiorenzo Treossi

27 November 1999 11	Bologna	0–0	Fiorentina	Bologna
		Report		Stadium: Stadio Renato Dall'Ara; Attendance: 27,000; Referee: Cosimo Bolognino

5 December 1999 12	Fiorentina	2–1	Milan	Florence
	Batistuta 21'; Heinrich 42'	Report	Bierhoff 1'	Stadium: Stadio Artemio Franchi; Attendance: 36,000; Referee: Gennaro Borriello

12 December 1999 13	Lazio	2–0	Fiorentina	Rome
	Bokšić 15'; Stanković 71'	Report		Stadium: Stadio Olimpico; Attendance: 48,000; Referee: Livio Bazzoli

19 December 1999 14	Fiorentina	1–1	Juventus	Florence
	Batistuta 20'	Report	Tudor 17'	Stadium: Stadio Artemio Franchi; Attendance: 40,000; Referee: Domenico Messina

6 January 2000 15	Lecce	0–0	Fiorentina	Lecce
		Report		Stadium: Stadio Via del Mare; Attendance: 10,428; Referee: Emilio Pellegrino

9 January 2000 16	Fiorentina	2–1	Internazionale	Florence
	Batistuta 38'; Adani 90+1'	Report	Recoba 71'	Stadium: Stadio Artemio Franchi; Attendance: 37,000; Referee: Alfredo Trentalange

15 January 2000 17	Venezia	2–1	Fiorentina	Venice
	Volpi 12'; Maniero 90+4'	Report	Batistuta 45+2'	Stadium: Stadio Pier Luigi Penzo; Attendance: 9,598; Referee: Fiorenzo Treossi

23 January 2000 18	Bari	1–0	Fiorentina	Bari
	Spinesi 84'	Report		Stadium: Stadio San Nicola; Attendance: 30,000; Referee: Domenico Messina

30 January 2000 19	Fiorentina	1–0	Reggina	Florence
	Batistuta 51'	Report		Stadium: Stadio Artemio Franchi; Attendance: 35,000; Referee: Cosimo Bolognino

6 February 2000 20	Hellas Verona	2–2	Fiorentina	Verona
	Morfeo 45+5', 53'	Report	Batistuta 23'; Rui Costa 69'	Stadium: Stadio Marc'Antonio Bentegodi; Attendance: 16,085; Referee: Gianluca Paparesta

13 February 2000 21	Fiorentina	1–1	Udinese	Florence
	Batistuta 72'	Report	Jørgensen 62'	Stadium: Stadio Artemio Franchi; Attendance: 35,000; Referee: Nicola Ayroldi

19 February 2000 22	Roma	4–0	Fiorentina	Rome
	Montella 6', 80', 90'; Nakata 27'	Report		Stadium: Stadio Olimpico; Attendance: 59,788; Referee: Salvatore Racalbuto

26 February 2000 23	Parma	0–4	Fiorentina	Parma
		Report	Balbo 22'; Rui Costa 66', 75'; Mijatović 85'	Stadium: Stadio Ennio Tardini; Attendance: 20,000; Referee: Stefano Farina

4 March 2000 24	Fiorentina	2–1	Piacenza	Florence
	Balbo 58'; Rui Costa 83'	Report	Di Napoli 90'	Stadium: Stadio Artemio Franchi; Attendance: 30,000; Referee: Paolo Bertini

12 March 2000 25	Torino	1–0	Fiorentina	Turin
	Ferrante 20'	Report		Stadium: Stadio delle Alpi; Attendance: 20,000; Referee: Gennaro Borriello

18 March 2000 26	Fiorentina	2–0	Cagliari	Florence
	Batistuta 17'; Mijatović 60'	Report		Stadium: Stadio Artemio Franchi; Attendance: 32,000; Referee: Massimo De Santis

25 March 2000 27	Perugia	1–2	Fiorentina	Perugia
	Rapaić 15'	Report	Batistuta 8'; Chiesa 69'	Stadium: Stadio Renato Curi; Attendance: 15,000; Referee: Stefano Cassarà

1 April 2000 28	Fiorentina	2–2	Bologna	Florence
	Batistuta 38', 89'	Report	Signori 12'; Andersson 57'	Stadium: Stadio Artemio Franchi; Attendance: 33,000; Referee: Daniele Tombolini

9 April 2000 29	Milan	1–1	Fiorentina	Milan
	Leonardo 76'	Report	Di Livio 71'	Stadium: San Siro; Attendance: 60,000; Referee: Emilio Pellegrino

15 April 2000 30	Fiorentina	3–3	Lazio	Florence
	Batistuta 25', 90+2'; Chiesa 54'	Report	Nedvěd 27'; Bokšić 31'; Mihajlović 89' (pen.)	Stadium: Stadio Artemio Franchi; Attendance: 39,000; Referee: Daniele Tombolini

22 April 2000 31	Juventus	1–0	Fiorentina	Turin
	Del Piero 45+2' (pen.)	Report		Stadium: Stadio delle Alpi; Attendance: 45,000; Referee: Gianluca Paparesta

30 April 2000 32	Fiorentina	3–0	Lecce	Florence
	Tarozzi 41'; Chiesa 43'; Batistuta 83'	Report		Stadium: Stadio Artemio Franchi; Attendance: 32,000; Referee: Fiorenzo Treossi

7 May 2000 33	Internazionale	0–4	Fiorentina	Milan
		Report	Chiesa 31', 46'; Batistuta 70'; Bressan 87'	Stadium: San Siro; Attendance: 65,616; Referee: Stefano Braschi

14 May 2000 34	Fiorentina	3–0	Venezia	Florence
	Batistuta 7', 19', 83'	Report		Stadium: Stadio Artemio Franchi; Attendance: 36,000; Referee: Pierpaolo Rossi

=== Coppa Italia ===
==== Round of 16 ====
1 December 1999 First leg	Perugia	1–0	Fiorentina	Perugia
	Milanese 4'			Stadium: Stadio Renato Curi

12 December 1999 Second leg	Fiorentina	2–0 (2–1 agg.)	Perugia	Florence
	Bressan 1'; Chiesa 12'			Stadium: Stadio Artemio Franchi

==== Quarter-finals ====
18 January 2000 First leg	Venezia	0–0	Fiorentina	Venice
				Stadium: Stadio Pier Luigi Penzo

26 January 2000 Second leg	Fiorentina	1–1 (1–1a agg.)	Venezia	Florence
	Adani 62'		Berg 84'	Stadium: Stadio Artemio Franchi

=== UEFA Champions League ===
==== Third qualifying round ====
11 August 1999 First leg	Fiorentina (Italy)	3–1	(Poland) Widzew Łódź	Florence, Italy
20:45 CEST (UTC+02:00)	Adani 17', (yellow card) 86'; Řepka (yellow card) 22'; Di Livio (yellow card) 27'; Cois (yellow card) 51', (goal) 57'; Rui Costa 89'	Report	Pawlak (yellow card) 2'; Kiełbowicz (yellow card) 7'; Kaczmarczyk (yellow card) 12'; Stolarczyk (yellow card) 19'; Adani 73' (o.g.); Olszewski (yellow card) 80'	Stadium: Stadio Artemio Franchi; Attendance: 30,601; Referee: David Elleray (England)

25 August 1999 Second leg	Widzew Łódź (Poland)	0–2 (1–5 agg.)	(Italy) Fiorentina	Łódź, Poland
18:00 CEST (UTC+02:00)	Kiełbowicz (yellow card) 2'	Report	Cois (yellow card) 6', (goal) 67'; Chiesa 39'; Padalino (yellow card) 85'	Stadium: Stadion Widzewa; Attendance: 6,500; Referee: Alain Sars (France)

==== Group stage ====
Pos	Team	Pld	W	D	L	GF	GA	GD	Pts	Qualification
1	(Spain) Barcelona	6	4	2	0	19	9	+10	14	Advance to second group stage
2	(Italy) Fiorentina	6	2	3	1	9	7	+2	9	Advance to second group stage
3	(England) Arsenal	6	2	2	2	9	9	0	8	Transfer to UEFA Cup
4	(Sweden) AIK	6	0	1	5	4	16	−12	1	

Source: UEFA

14 September 1999 1	Fiorentina (Italy)	0–0	(England) Arsenal	Florence, Italy
20:45 CEST (UTC+02:00)	Pierini (yellow card) 15'; Di Livio (yellow card) 37'; Toldo (yellow card) 80'	Report	Vieira (yellow card) 20'; Keown (yellow card) 26'; Šuker (yellow card) 51'; Ljungberg (yellow card) 69'	Stadium: Stadio Artemio Franchi; Attendance: 37,903; Referee: Hellmut Krug (Germany)

22 September 1999 2	Barcelona (Spain)	4–2	(Italy) Fiorentina	Barcelona, Spain
20:45 CEST (UTC+02:00)	Figo 7'; Luis Enrique 10'; Rivaldo 68' (pen.), 70'	Report	Mijatović (yellow card) 31'; Batistuta 50'; Padalino (yellow card) 68'; Chiesa 79'	Stadium: Camp Nou; Attendance: 79,000; Referee: Kim Milton Nielsen (Denmark)

29 September 1999 3	AIK (Sweden)	0–0	(Italy) Fiorentina	Solna, Sweden
20:45 CEST (UTC+02:00)	Novaković (yellow card) 80'	Report	Batistuta (yellow card) 68'; Bressan (yellow card) 68'; Řepka (yellow card) 70'	Stadium: Råsunda Stadium; Attendance: 30,195; Referee: Günter Benkö (Austria)

19 October 1999 4	Fiorentina (Italy)	3–0	(Sweden) AIK	Florence, Italy
20:45 CEST (UTC+02:00)	Batistuta 5'; Chiesa 32'; Balbo 86'	Report	Brundin (yellow card) 81'	Stadium: Stadio Artemio Franchi; Attendance: 15,280; Referee: Jan Wegereef (Netherlands)

27 October 1999 5	Arsenal (England)	0–1	(Italy) Fiorentina	London, England
20:45 CEST (UTC+02:00)	Parlour (yellow card) 27'; Petit (yellow card) 53'; Adams (yellow card) 56'	Report	Batistuta (yellow card) 2', (goal) 75'; Rossitto (yellow card) 53'; Řepka (yellow card) 56'; Rui Costa (yellow card) 75'	Stadium: Wembley Stadium; Attendance: 73,256; Referee: Ľuboš Micheľ (Slovakia)

2 November 1999 6	Fiorentina (Italy)	3–3	(Spain) Barcelona	Florence, Italy
20:45 CET (UTC+01:00)	Bressan 14'; Adani (yellow card) 51'; Balbo 56', 69'	Report	Figo 20'; Rivaldo 43', 74'	Stadium: Stadio Artemio Franchi; Attendance: 23,588; Referee: Hugh Dallas (Scotland)

==== Second group stage ====
Pos	Team	Pld	W	D	L	GF	GA	GD	Pts	Qualification
1	(England) Manchester United	6	4	1	1	10	4	+6	13	Advance to knockout stage
2	(Spain) Valencia	6	3	1	2	9	5	+4	10	Advance to knockout stage
3	(Italy) Fiorentina	6	2	2	2	7	8	−1	8	
4	(France) Bordeaux	6	0	2	4	5	14	−9	2	

Source: UEFA

23 November 1999 1	Fiorentina (Italy)	2–0	(England) Manchester United	Florence, Italy
20:45 CET (UTC+01:00)	Batistuta 24', (yellow card) 77'; Balbo 52'	Report		Stadium: Stadio Artemio Franchi; Attendance: 36,002; Referee: Bernd Heynemann (Germany)

8 December 1999 2	Bordeaux (France)	0–0	(Italy) Fiorentina	Bordeaux, France
20:45 CET (UTC+01:00)		Report	Firicano (yellow card) 43'; Rui Costa (yellow card) 77'; Torricelli (yellow card) 88'	Stadium: Stade du Parc Lescure; Attendance: 21,987; Referee: Karl-Erik Nilsson (Sweden)

1 March 2000 3	Fiorentina (Italy)	1–0	(Spain) Valencia	Florence, Italy
20:45 CET (UTC+01:00)	Mijatović 19' (pen.); Cois (yellow card) 28'; Toldo (yellow card) 45'; Batistuta (yellow card) 90'	Report	López (yellow card) 59'	Stadium: Stadio Artemio Franchi; Attendance: 30,000; Referee: Markus Merk (Germany)

7 March 2000 4	Valencia (Spain)	2–0	(Italy) Fiorentina	Valencia, Spain
20:45 CET (UTC+01:00)	López (yellow card) 27'; Ilie 35', (yellow card) 77'; Pellegrino (yellow card) 88'; Mendieta 90' (pen.)	Report	Cois (yellow card) 31'; Amoroso (yellow card) 59'; Tarozzi (yellow card) 89'	Stadium: Mestalla; Attendance: 45,000; Referee: Hellmut Krug (Germany)

15 March 2000 5	Manchester United (England)	3–1	(Italy) Fiorentina	Manchester, England
20:45 CET (UTC+01:00)	Cole 20'; Keane 33'; Beckham (yellow card) 37'; Yorke 70'	Report	Batistuta 16'; Torricelli (yellow card) 39'; Rossitto (red card) 61'; Adani (yellow card) 68'; Pierini (yellow card) 77'	Stadium: Old Trafford; Attendance: 59,926; Referee: Ryszard Wójcik (Poland)

21 March 2000 6	Fiorentina (Italy)	3–3	(France) Bordeaux	Florence, Italy
20:45 CET (UTC+01:00)	Řepka (yellow card) 45'; Chiesa 47' (pen.); Batistuta 61'; Rui Costa 64'; Pierini (yellow card) 77'	Report	Wiltord 5'; Alicarte (red card) 46'; Bonnissel (yellow card) 61'; Zanotti 87'; Batlles 90' (pen.)	Stadium: Stadio Artemio Franchi; Attendance: 14,239; Referee: Dieter Schoch (Switzerland)

== Statistics ==
=== Appearances and goals ===
No.	Pos	Nat	Player	Total		Serie A		Coppa		Champions League	
No.	Pos	Nat	Player	Apps	Goals	Apps	Goals	Apps	Goals	Apps	Goals
1	GK	(Italy) ITA	Toldo	50	-53	34	-38	3	-1	13	-14
4	DF	(Italy) ITA	Adani	40	3	23+4	1	4	1	6+3	1
2	DF	(Czech Republic) CZE	Repka	46	0	26+3	0	4	0	13	0
23	DF	(Italy) ITA	Pierini	41	1	26+2	1	1	0	12	0
6	DF	(Italy) ITA	Firicano	30	1	19+1	1	3	0	6+1	0
17	DF	(Germany) GER	Heinrich	41	2	24	2	4	0	13	0
16	MF	(Italy) ITA	Di Livio	46	2	30	2	2	0	14	0
10	MF	(Portugal) POR	Rui Costa	48	6	29+1	4	4	0	14	2
14	MF	(Italy) ITA	Cois	35	2	20+3	0	1	0	11	2
20	FW	(Italy) ITA	Chiesa	39	12	24	7	4	1	9+2	4
9	FW	(Argentina) ARG	Batistuta	43	29	30	23	2	0	11	6
12	GK	(Italy) ITA	Taglialatela	2	-3	0	0	1	-1	1	-2
19	MF	(Italy) ITA	Amoroso	35	0	15+8	0	4	0	3+5	0
3	DF	(Italy) ITA	Torricelli	23	0	15	0	2	0	6	0
11	MF	(Italy) ITA	Rossitto	37	0	12+14	0	4	0	3+4	0
8	FW	(Federal Republic of Yugoslavia) YUG	Mijatovic	25	3	12+4	2	0	0	9	1
18	FW	(Argentina) ARG	Balbo	31	7	9+10	3	2	0	3+7	4
27	DF	(Italy) ITA	Tarozzi	23	1	8+10	1	2	0	0+3	0
5	DF	(Italy) ITA	Padalino	14	0	7+1	0	1	0	5	0
21	MF	(Italy) ITA	Bressan	29	3	6+14	1	3	1	2+4	1
15	MF	(Australia) AUS	Okon	16	0	3+8	0	1	0	0+4	0
7	MF	(Spain) ESP	Amor	11	0	2+6	0	1	0	0+2	0
25	FW	(Greece) GRE	Vakouftsis	3	0	1+1	0	1	0		
31	FW	(Italy) ITA	Taddei	2	0	0+2	0	0	0		
25	FW	(Belgium) BEL	Oliveira	1	0	0+1	0	0	0		
13	MF	(Italy) ITA	Pagliuca	0	0	0	0				
22	GK	(Italy) ITA	Mareggini								
32	DF	(Italy) ITA	Mugnaini	0	0	0	0				
35	MF	(Italy) ITA	Musso	0	0	0	0				

- Source: http://calcio-seriea.net/presenze/1999/1162/

=== Goalscorers ===
- (Argentina) Gabriel Batistuta 23
- (Italy) Enrico Chiesa 7
- (Portugal) Rui Costa 4
- (Argentina) Abel Balbo 3
