= 2001 Supercoppa Italiana =

- Event: Supercoppa Italiana
Roma	Fiorentina
Serie A	Coppa Italia
3	0
- Date: 19 August 2001
- Venue: Stadio Olimpico, Rome
- Referee: Graziano Cesari
- Attendance: 61,050

The 2001 Supercoppa Italiana was a match played by 2000–01 Serie A winners Roma and 2000–01 Coppa Italia winners Fiorentina.

The match took place on 19 August 2001 in Stadio Olimpico, Rome and resulted in a 3–0 victory for Roma. The goals were scored by Vincent Candela, Vincenzo Montella and Francesco Totti. It was the first time that Roma won this trophy.

== Match details ==
19 August 2001
20:45 CEST

Roma	3–0	Fiorentina
Candela 6'; Montella 53'; Totti 83'	(Report)

Stadio Olimpico, Rome
Attendance: 61,050
Referee: Graziano Cesari

Roma	Fiorentina

ROMA:
GK	80	(Italy) Ivan Pelizzoli
CB	15	(France) Jonathan Zebina
CB	19	(Argentina) Walter Samuel
CB	3	(Brazil) Antônio Carlos Zago
RWB	7	(Italy) Diego Fuser	(substituted off) 67'
LWB	32	(France) Vincent Candela
CM	17	(Italy) Damiano Tommasi
CM	8	(Brazil) Marcos Assunção	(substituted off) 81'
AM	10	(Italy) Francesco Totti (c)
CF	20	(Argentina) Gabriel Batistuta
CF	9	(Italy) Vincenzo Montella	(substituted off) 61'
Substitutes:
GK	1	(Italy) Francesco Antonioli
DF	23	(Italy) Sebastiano Siviglia
MF	5	(Brazil) Francisco Lima
MF	25	(Uruguay) Gianni Guigou	(substituted in) 67'
FW	16	(Argentina) Abel Balbo	(substituted in) 81'
FW	18	(Italy) Antonio Cassano
FW	24	(Italy) Marco Delvecchio	(substituted in) 61'
Manager:
(Italy) Fabio Capello

FIORENTINA:
GK	1	(Italy) Giuseppe Taglialatela
RB	7	(Italy) Angelo Di Livio (c)	Booked
CB	3	(Italy) Daniele Adani
CB	23	(Italy) Alessandro Pierini
LB	13	(Italy) Emiliano Moretti
RM	19	(Italy) Marco Rossi
CM	5	(Italy) Sandro Cois		(substituted off) 61'
CM	77	(Italy) Roberto Baronio		(substituted off) 67'
LM	10	(Italy) Domenico Morfeo
CF	20	(Italy) Enrico Chiesa
CF	21	(Portugal) Nuno Gomes		(substituted off) 81'
Substitutes:
GK	30	(Austria) Alex Manninger
DF	15	(Italy) Alessandro Agostini
DF	27	(Italy) Andrea Tarozzi		(substituted in) 67'
DF	76	(Italy) Paolo Vanoli
MF	17	(Argentina) Ezequiel González		(substituted in) 81'
MF	18	(Italy) Riccardo Taddei
FW	6	(Brazil) Leandro Amaral		(substituted in) 61'
Manager:
(Italy) Roberto Mancini

MATCH OFFICIALS

- Assistant referees:
- Fourth official:

MATCH RULES

- 90 minutes.
- 30 minutes of extra-time if necessary.
- Penalty shoot-out if scores still level.
- Seven named substitutes
- Maximum of 3 substitutions.

== See also ==
- 2001–02 AC Fiorentina season
- 2001–02 AS Roma season
