= Leonardo Semplici =

Italian footballer and manager

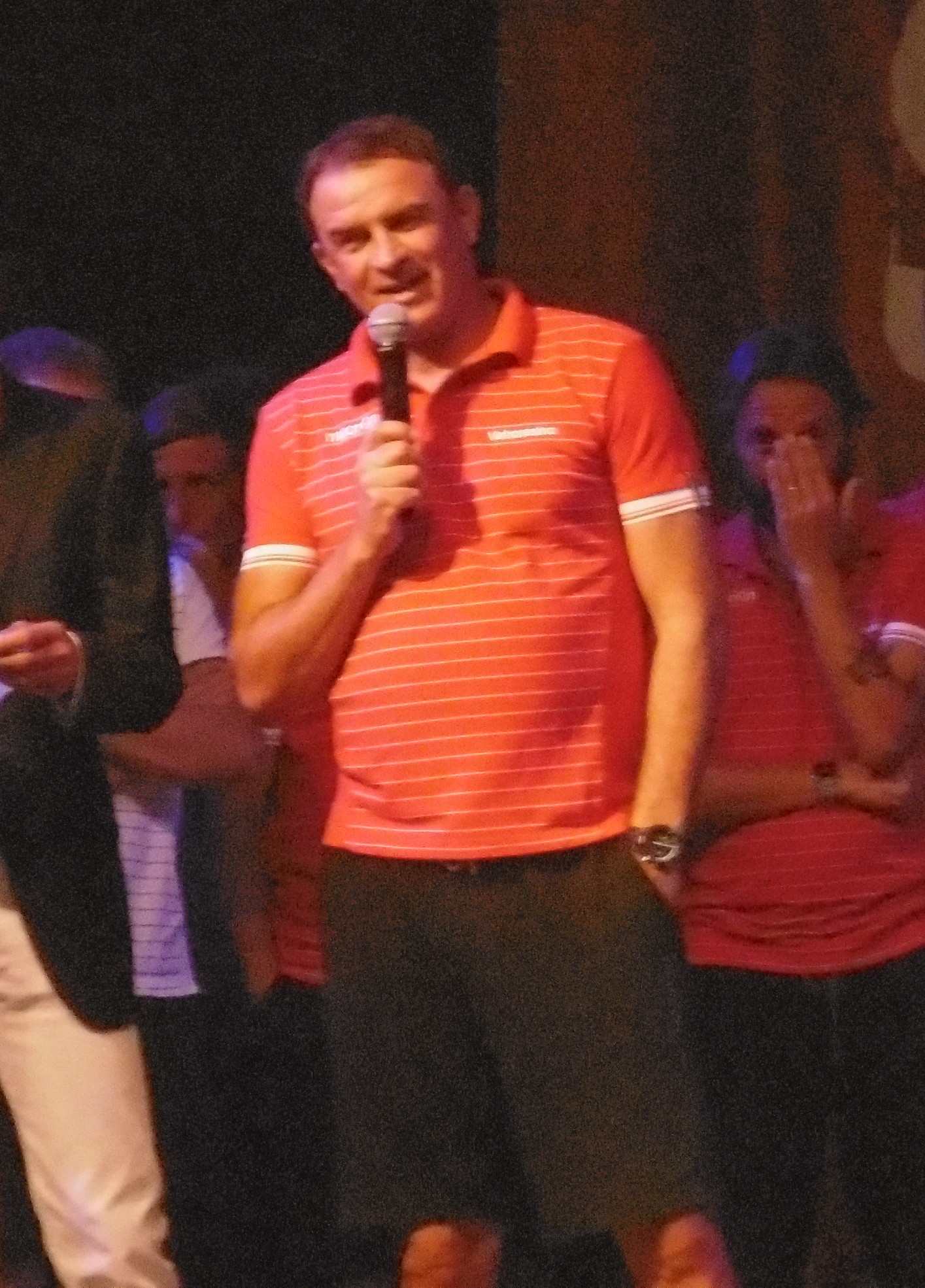
- Semplici with SPAL in 2017

Personal information
- Full name: Leonardo Semplici
- Date of birth: 18 July 1967 (age 59)
- Place of birth: Florence, Italy
- Height: 1.83 m (6 ft 0 in)
- Position: Defender

Youth career
- –1987: Lucchese

Senior career*
Years	Team	Apps	(Gls)
1987–1988	Lucchese	1	(0)
1988–1989	Sorso	33	(2)
1989–1990	Cecina	19	(1)
1992–1993	Certaldo	26	(1)
1994–1995	Sangiovannese	31	(3)
1995–1996	Arezzo	25	(2)
1996–1997	Impruneta	30	(3)
1997–1999	Rondinella	56	(2)
1999–2000	Sangimignano	25	(1)
2000–2002	Poggibonsi	32	(2)
2002–2003	Grosseto	8	(0)
Total		286	(17)

Managerial career
- 2004–2005: Sangimignano
- 2005–2009: Figline
- 2009: Arezzo
- 2010: Arezzo
- 2010–2011: Pisa
- 2011–2014: Fiorentina U19
- 2014–2020: SPAL
- 2021: Cagliari
- 2023: Spezia
- 2024–2025: Sampdoria
- * Club domestic league appearances and goals

Leonardo Semplici (born 18 July 1967) is an Italian professional football manager and former player.

== Playing career ==
His playing career mostly consisted of amateur and minor league players with Tuscan teams such as Lucchese.

== Coaching career ==
In 2004 Semplici took over from Eccellenza Tuscany club Sangimignano, bringing them back to Serie D. He successively took over at Figline, bringing the Eccellenza amateurs all the way up to Lega Pro Prima Divisione in his four years at the helm of the team. He then had two short stints as head coach of two more Tuscan teams, Arezzo and Pisa, before Fiorentina decided to appoint him as their new youth coach.

In December 2014 he took over at SPAL, guiding the Lega Pro club to Serie B promotion in 2016 and then to a surprising run for a Serie A promotion spot in his first Serie B season. On 13 May 2017, SPAL became the first team to win promotion from the 2016–17 Serie B, thus ensuring a spot in the 2017–18 Serie A, the first time in the top flight since 49 years for the small Ferrara-based club. The club remained in Serie A for the 2018–19 season, finishing in 13th position with 42 points. The following season proved difficult for the club, however, and after achieving just 15 points after twenty-three Serie A matches, Semplici was sacked as SPAL coach on 10 February 2020.

On 22 February 2021, Semplici was appointed manager of Cagliari. Appointed to replace Eusebio Di Francesco following a dismal first half of the season, Semplici succeeded to turn the Sardinians' fortunes and save Cagliari from relegation, being then confirmed in charge for the 2021–22 Serie A season. However, after achieving one point in the first three games of the season and following a 2–3 home loss to Genoa, Semplici was relieved from managerial duties on 14 September 2021.

On 11 December 2024, Semplici returned to management as the new head coach of Sampdoria, becoming the third coach of the season for the struggling Serie B club. He was sacked on 7 April 2025, leaving Sampdoria deep in the relegation zone.

== Managerial statistics ==
As of 6 April 2025

Managerial record by team and tenure
Team	Nat	From	To	Record							
Team	Nat	From	To	G	W	D	L	GF	GA	GD	Win %
Sangimignano	(Italy)	1 July 2004	30 June 2005	30	18	8	4	44	21	+23	60.00
Figline	(Italy)	1 July 2005	30 June 2009	146	77	48	21	211	112	+99	52.74
Arezzo	(Italy)	1 July 2009	17 November 2009	18	9	5	4	22	15	+7	50.00
Arezzo	(Italy)	19 April 2010	25 May 2010	4	2	0	2	4	5	−1	50.00
Pisa	(Italy)	30 November 2010	21 February 2011	10	3	2	5	13	16	−3	30.00
SPAL	(Italy)	8 December 2014	10 February 2020	219	91	53	75	294	259	+35	41.55
Cagliari	(Italy)	22 February 2021	14 September 2021	19	7	5	7	28	28	+0	36.84
Spezia	(Italy)	23 February 2023	30 June 2023	16	2	6	8	13	26	−13	12.50
Sampdoria	(Italy)	11 December 2024	7 April 2025	17	2	9	6	14	23	−9	11.76
Total				479	211	136	132	643	505	+138	44.05

== Honours ==
=== Player ===
Arezzo

- Campionato Nazionale Dilettanti: 1995–96 (group E)

Rondinella

- Campionato Nazionale Dilettanti: 1998–99 (group E)

Poggibonsi

- Serie D: 1999–2000 (group E)

=== Coach ===
Sangimignano

- Eccellenza Toscana: 2004–05 (group B)

Figline

- Lega Pro Seconda Divisione: 2008–09 (group B)
- Serie D: 2007–08 (group E)
- Eccellenza Toscana: 2005–06 (group B)
- Supercoppa di Lega di Seconda Divisione: 2009

SPAL

- Serie B: 2016–17
- Lega Pro: 2015–16 (group B)
- Supercoppa di Lega Pro: 2016

Individual

- Panchina d'Argento Lega Pro Seconda Divisione: 2008–09
- Panchina d'Oro Lega Pro: 2015–16
- Panchina d'Argento: 2016–17
