= Robbiati =

Robbiati is an Italian surname. Notable people with the surname include:

- Anselmo Robbiati (b. 1970), Italian footballer and manager, son of Luigi
- Luigi Robbiati (b. 1935), Italian footballer, father of Anselmo
