= Luca Ceccarelli =

Luca Ceccarelli may refer to:

- Luca Ceccarelli (footballer, born 20 March 1983), Italian football fullback, currently plays for Arezzo
- Luca Ceccarelli (footballer, born 24 March 1983), Italian football winger or fullback, currently plays for San Marino Calcio
- Luca Ceccarelli (filmmaker) (born in 1974) Filmmaker, born in Nottingham

== See also ==
- Luca Ceccaroli (born 1995), Sanmarinese footballer
