= Franco Baldini =

Italian footballer (born 1960)

Personal information
- Date of birth: 3 October 1960 (age 66)
- Place of birth: Reggello, Italy
- Position: Midfielder

Senior career*
Years	Team	Apps	(Gls)
1979–1980	Sangiovannese	30	(7)
1980–1981	Varese	23	(1)
1981–1982	Bologna	23	(0)
1982–1984	Bari	47	(3)
1984–1985	Pescara	34	(1)
1985–1987	Campobasso	57	(2)
1987–1988	Foggia	26	(5)
1988–1989	Casertana	25	(1)
1991–1992	Colligiana	?	(9)

International career
1981	Italy U-21	0	(0)

Managerial career
- 1999–2005: Roma (Director of Football)
- 2006–2007: Real Madrid (Director)
- 2007–2011: England (Assistant Manager)
- 2011–2013: Roma (Director)
- 2013–2015: Tottenham Hotspur (Technical Director)
- 2025-: Panathinaikos (Advisor)
- * Club domestic league appearances and goals

Franco Baldini (born 3 October 1960) is an Italian former professional footballer and former technical director for English club Tottenham Hotspur of the Premier League.

== Playing career ==
Born in Reggello, Baldini most notably played for Bari and Bologna. In 1981, he was called up to the Italian under-21 national team, but did not go on to make a competitive appearance.

== Managerial career ==
=== Roma ===
Baldini became director of football at Roma in 1999, where he remained until his resignation in March 2005. He joined Fabio Capello at Real Madrid in 2006, and when Capello took over as the England manager in December 2007, Baldini became his assistant manager. His role at the national team of England involved scouting, managing the supporting staff (e.g. the doctors, physiotherapists, masseurs and kit managers) and generally making the job as easy as possible for Capello. He left England after their successful UEFA Euro 2012 qualification and joined Roma before the start of 2012, but was assisting the team well before then.

Since then, former Roma manager Luis Enrique, Director Walter Sabatini and himself have undergone a major revolution at the club alongside new owner Thomas R. DiBenedetto to try and instil a system of running a football club similar to that of Barcelona. However, his time at Roma was criticised by removing Luis Enrique as manager and replacing him with Zdeněk Zeman; Baldini believed appointing Zemen was a mistake and said that the club wanted to give the fans a spectacle. Baldini left his post at Roma by mutual consent on 5 June 2013.

On 19 June 2013, Baldini was confirmed in the role of technical director of Tottenham Hotspur.

=== Tottenham Hotspur ===
At the end of the 2012–13 Premier League season, then-Tottenham manager André Villas-Boas openly pushed for someone to be employed as a technical director, "someone who has experience of dressing rooms, represents the club, and is able to link up with players and agents." Soon after, on 19 June 2013, Baldini was appointed to the role. He immediately oversaw the departures of Spurs players Steven Caulker, Tom Huddlestone, Clint Dempsey, Scott Parker and Gareth Bale, the latter for a world record fee of £85.3 million to Real Madrid.

Baldini was also thought to be responsible for signing several replacement players during the same summer, including Paulinho, Nacer Chadli, Étienne Capoue, Roberto Soldado, Vlad Chiricheș, Christian Eriksen and Erik Lamela. Later in 2013, however, Villas-Boas was sacked by the Tottenham Board on 16 December following a humbling 5–0 home defeat to Liverpool. It is thought that Baldini offered his resignation, perhaps as a sign of accepting culpability for the poor form of the team. It was widely discussed in the media at the time that most of the players signed by Baldini were not performing as well as had been expected. Baldini, however, remained in his post after new manager Tim Sherwood replaced Villas-Boas.

Baldini left his role as technical director on 28 September 2015 to spend time outside football.
