= ASD Olimpia Colligiana =

Italian football club

Colligiana
- Full name: Associazione Sportiva Dilettantistica Olimpia Colligiana
- Founded: 1922; 104 years ago as, U.S. Colligiana; 1946; 80 years ago as, V.F. Colligiana; 2010; 16 years ago as, A.S.D. Colle Giovane; 2011; 15 years ago as, A.S.D. Olimpia Colligiana
- Ground: Stadio Gino Manni, Colle di Val d'Elsa, Italy
- Capacity: 3,000
- Chairman: Massimo Rugi
- Manager: Gabriele Bencivenni
- League: Eccellenza Tuscany
- 2017–18: Serie D/Girone B, 19th (relegated)
- Website: https://www.colligianacalcio.it/
| Home colours | Away colours |

Associazione Sportiva Dilettantistica Olimpia Colligiana is an Italian association football club based in Colle di Val d'Elsa, Tuscany that competes in Eccellenza Tuscany.

== History ==
=== The origins of U.S. Colligiana ===
The U.S. Colligiana club was founded 21 April 1922 with Remo Bocci as its first chairman. Initially the club was also involved in other sports, such as gymnastics and cycling.

The club quickly rose through the Italian leagues, making the Third Division (fourth level of Italian football) in the 1926–27 season (finishing in second place under coach Frigerio) and 1927–28 season. In the 1928–29 season U.S. Colligiana made it to the championship tournament in the Second Division (third level of Italian football), finishing fifth place in group G. U.S. Colligiana continued to play in the Second Division until the birth of the National Division Serie B, but was then downgraded to level IV and played only moderately well.

=== Valdelsa Football Colligiana ===
Old Valdelsa Football Colligiana logo

In 1946 the club was renamed Valdelsa Football Colligiana.

With the exception of the Serie C 1947-48, V.F. Colligiana only played in the amateur leagues, playing in over twenty Serie D championships (known by different names over the years, including Second Division, Third Division Interregional, IV series, National Amateur Championship and League Inter [2]) until the 2008–09 season when it advanced to Lega Pro Seconda Divisione B.

==== The European record ====
The 1957–58 season was one of the most important for Colligiana. Under the chairmanship of Englishman Justin Gallant and coach Gino Manni, Colligiana set an Italian and European record of 17 consecutive wins, becoming Tuscan first division champion and making national television and newspapers. The record for consecutive wins had previously been held by Siena, the so-called "miracle" team, with 14 wins in the 1955–56 season (before Siena, Juventus held the record with 11 wins).

===== The streak record =====
1. San Miniato-Colligiana (0–2)
2. Colligiana-A.C. Pistoia (3–0)
3. Montelupo-Colligiana (0–1)
4. Colligiana-Sesto (3–1)
5. Cerreto-Colligiana (1–4)
6. Colligiana-Lastrese (7–1)
7. A. Pistoia-Colligiana (0–2)
8. Colligiana-Castelfiorentino (5–0)
9. Peretola-Colligiana (0–2)
10. Colligiana-Scandicci (1–0)
11. Colligiana-Galcianese (1–0)
12. Lanciotto-Colligiana (0–2)
13. Colligiana-Rifredi (4–0)
14. Colligiana-Jolli C. (1–0)
15. Brozzi-Colligiana (0–8)
16. Colligiana-San Miniato (3–0)
17. A.C. Pistoia-Colligiana (0–1)

===== 1957–58 Championship Results =====
| Date | Result | Calendar | Return | Result |
|---|---|---|---|---|
| | 0–2 | SAN MINIATO-COLLIGIANA | | 3–0 |
| | 3–0 | COLLIGIANA- A.C. PISTOIA | | 0–1 |
| | 0–1 | MONTELUPO-COLLIGIANA | | 0–4 |
| | 3–1 | COLLIGIANA-SESTO | | 2–1 |
| | 1–4 | CERRETO-COLLIGIANA | 05/02/1958 | 5–0 |
| | 7–1 | COLLIGIANA-LASTRESE | | 3–3 |
| | 0–2 | A. PISTOIA-COLLIGIANA | | 0–2 |
| 09/12/1957 | 5–0 | COLLIGIANA – CASTELFIORENTINO | | 0–0 |
| | 0–2 | PERETOLA-COLLIGIANA | | 0–1 |
| 26 December 1957 | 1–0 | COLLIGIANA-SCANDICCI | | 1–1 |
| | 1–0 | COLLIGIANA-GALCIANESE | | 2–0 |
| | 0–2 | LANCIOTTO-COLLIGIANA | | 0–1 |
| | 4–0 | COLLIGIANA-RIFREDI | | 1–1 |
| | 1–0 | COLLIGIANA-JOLLI C. | | 2–1 |
| | 0–8 | BROZZI-COLLIGIANA | | 0–5 |

===== Player statistics =====
| Player | Championship | |
| Player | Attendance | Goal |
|---|---|---|
| Leopoldo Bruchi | 34 | = |
| Silvano Panti | 34 | = |
| Eliano Biotti | 4 | = |
| Franco Lotti | 30 | 1 |
| Antonio della Malva | 2 | = |
| Luciano Manni | 2 | 1 |
| Francesco Carmignani | 34 | 3 |
| Danilo Nencetti | 22 | = |
| Giovanni Vergani | 30 | 1 |
| Elio Dell’Aiuto | 1 | = |
| Mario Vinciguerra | 2 | = |
| Fausto Pacchierotti | 26 | 4 |
| Italo Polese | 21 | 7 |
| Claudio Gnoato | 32 | 19 |
| Franco Malandrini | 31 | 21 |
| Pier Giorgio Soldi | 21 | 7 |
| Franco Morelli | 28 | 2 |
| Vito Agnorelli | 15 | 9 |
| Piaceri | 5 | 2 |

===== Tuscan Cup Finals for the First Division =====
- 1957–58 semifinals: Colligiana-Torrita 3–0 and 1–2
- 1957–58 finals: Collesalvetti-Colligiana 3–1 and 1–4

==== 1960–1980 ====
In the 1968–69 season Colligiana hoped to be included in the new First Class championship by the Association for Promotion, but the club was accused of fraud and demoted to the Second Class. Colligiana won the championship against Castellina and came first in the series. The championship club included Uliano Vettori, Paul Fratiglioni, Sergio Ciampoli, Charles Swan, Vito Galgani, Simoni, Nevio Vannuccini, Gasparri, Pietro Fratiglioni, Angelo Tonani, Ciardi, Mario Tozzi, Fleano Pineschi and Palazzini.

In the 1972–73 season the record-setting coach Gino Manni returned and Colligiana was promoted to the First Class championship. Colligiana overcame a gap of seven points to finish the season in first place over rival club Cecina. The club included goalkeepers Alfredo Paolicchi (former Fiorentina season 1965–66) and Luigi Serpi; defenders Roberto Spinelli, Paolo Fredianelli, Mauro Marini, Mauro Viviani and Luciano Manni, midfielders Peter Fratiglioni, Aleandro Aiazzi, Rolando Baldi and Mauro Ciampi; and attackers Gaetano Siracusa, Mario Tozzi, Mauro Barsotti and Ottavio Rauggi.

In May 1974 Colligiana defeated Serie A club Genoa 2–1 in a friendly match, facing star players Mario Corso, Robert Rosato, Luigi Simoni, Claudio Maselli and Antonio Bordon.

==== The 1980s ====
Colligiana's 1981–1982 season began with a corporate crisis. A new board was elected, led by former player Peter Fratiglioni as president. In 1982, the club made headlines when it put on a Trump-financed tournament with the participation of thousands of couples and a prize of a flat.

To return to its former glory, Colligiana hoped to rely on local players like Paolo Fratiglioni (1968–69 goalkeeper), Franco Michelucci, Paolo Buzzichelli, and Gaetano Siracusa, as well as some younger players like Luca Vettori, Carlo Pasquale Pondrelli Massimo Conforti, "Gigino" Gozzi and the promising but frequently-injured Sergio Secchi. Colligiana also moved to the new City Stadium in 1982, later named for coach Gino Manni.

In 1983–84 Colligiana won the championship with new coach Mauro Bettarini, father of the famous Stefano. Players included goalkeepers Paul Fratiglioni and Massimo Cambi; defenders Sergio Sezzatini, Alessio Guidotti, Pasquale Pondrelli, Massimo Cappelli and Paolo Buzzichelli; midfielders Luca Vettori, Massimo Conforti, Mario Boschi, Giordano Pucci and Aleandro Aiazzi; and attackers Gaetano Siracusa, Marcello Capecchi, Daniele Paoletti and Angelo Cardone.

==== Series D (Interregional Championship) ====
At the end of the 1985–86 season Colligiana was promoted to the Interregional Championship under coach Bettarini. The following year Collgiani fell again into the Promozione league and Ennio Pellegrini became the club's coach. Pellegrini previously played for Fiorentina and helped the team earn promotion to the Serie A Interregional Championship. The winning group F of the National Amateur Championship (formerly Inter-League or Serie D), would be able to earn a promotion to the Serie C2 but would not automatically be admitted. For the first and only time, a series of playoff matches was held to determine promotion, and Colligiana played against opponent Avezzano for those playoffs. Colligiana was defeated 2–0 in the first match in Abruzzo, then earned a 1–1 draw in Colle di Val d'Elsa.

The chairman for this season was Luciano Ninci and the club received technical assistance from Piero Braglia. Players included goalkeepers Filippo Gambelli and Andrea Alboni; defenders Gino Balli, Alessandro Caioni, Massimo Cardelli, Riccardo Roselli, Giovanni Guerrini, Simone Settesoldi, Baldassarre Buzzichelli and Fabio Giotti; midfielders Nazzareno Baggiarini, Federico Frediani, Daniele Visani, Cristiano Signorini, Simone Baldi, Isaia Tani and Damiano Baldini; and attackers Antonio Bruno, Giovanni Giordani, Alessandro Franchi and Stefano Cipriani.

In the 1993–94 championships Colligiana played in the first class, coached by Giorgio Rosadini. Colliagiana finished behind Pro Vercelli, despite prolific striker Mastacchi's 19 goals and Filippo Gambelli on defence going 7 games without conceding. This was also the year of promising young player Tommaso Movilli.

In the 2001–02 season Colligiana played in the Serie D for the 15th consecutive season, a national record, under coach Claudio Rastelli. Colliagiana ranked fourth last to place and despite appeals for irregularity in the match lost to Todi, was demoted to the Eccellenza league.

Many players from the 1980s and 1990s have returned to Colligiana in recent years, including strikers Claudio Mastacchi and Massimiliano Santoro, Filippo Gambelli, Gianni Agrumi, Simone Baldi, Franco Baldini, Mario Boschi, Alessandro Caioni, Marco Calonaci, Fabrizio Calattini, Massimo Cardelli, Alessandro Cianetti, Graziano De Luca, Claudio Di Prete, Sauro Fattori, Giancarlo Favarin, Federico Frediani, Gabriele Garfagnini, Giovanni Guerrini, Mattia Masi, Ruby Mearini, Franco Merendi, Tommaso Movilli, Massimiliano Pellegrini, Riccardo Roselli, Sergio Sezzatini, Cristiano Signorini, Giuseppe Sacchini, Marcello Sansonetti, Luca Tognozzi, Daniele Visani, Giacomo Zanelli, and Eugenio Zangrillo.

==== Eccellenza 2006–07 ====
Under presidents Fabio and Mauro Biancuccio Monnecchi, V.F.D. Colligiana rallied in the 2006–07 season and won the Cup of Eccellenza Tuscany, Group B several days before the end of the tournament, earning promotion to Serie D. Rigucci and Rojas were the top two scorers of the tournament. The club was coached by Mr. Roberto Biccherai and players included goalkeepers Lapo Giusti, Marco Gioli and Francesco Bianciardi; defenders Gionata Antoni, Davide Bertolucci, Luca Bonini, Massimiliano Burchi, Marcello Labruna, Andra Pobega and Alessio Vannini; midfielders Hector Simon Acosta, Paolo Andreotti, Alessandro Bartoli, Andrea Corsi, Stefano Illiano and Matteo Lombardi; and attackers Luigi Guerrera, Manuel Nencini, Atos Rigucci, Fermin Rojas, Dario Pietro Tranchitella and Simone Vespignani.

In the same season the junior club led by Paolo Molfese won the Championship Class and the title of regional champion. The club was eliminated in the national quarterfinals by champions Tor di Quinto.

==== Serie D 2007–2008 ====
In the 2007–2008 season, V.F.D. Colligiana played in the Serie D for the twenty-first time in Group E. Colligiana reached the Cup final of the Serie D Italian Cup but lost the Series D double final against Como.

Colligiana finished the season in second place behind Figline, then lost twice to Alghero in the national final play-off series. Colliagana ultimately finished third in the Second Division.

The junior club under Paul Molfese again won its round of the Junior National Championship and tied for the most points of the season with Figlinesi.

==== Second Division 2008–2009 ====
In the 2008–2009 season, Colligiana's sole goal was to stay in the Lega Pro Seconda Divisione under the leadership of Roberto Bicchierai and Nario Cardini. The season started well with two wins, but the club's offence suffered in later matches. The former footballer Georgio Bresciani was appointed general manager in November 2008, following Cardini's resignation. Though the Colligiana defence played well, the club did not qualify for play-offs and finished the season 12th, tied with Sangiovannese.

==== Second Division 2009–2010 ====
Again, Colligiana was forced to defend its place in the Lega Pro Seconda Divisione in the 2009–2010 season. The club was coached by Maurizio Costantini, who was a player in Serie B and C (playing for multiple years with Triestina in Serie B) and trainer for various clubs in Serie C(Giorgione, Triestina, Mestre, Acireale Calcio, Salernitana, and last season in Juve Stabia). Costantini also trained Catania in Serie B in the 2004–05 season.

The 2009–2010 season also brought a new corporate structure with multiple new faces including owner Biancucci and general director Giorgio Bresciani and a number of new players (only Collini, Billio, Savoldi, Russo and Pellegrini remained from the previous season).

Despite new management and players, this was a season of multiple shake-ups. Colliagiana suffered a defeat at home on the ninth day of the championship and Costantini was temporarily replaced by Zaccaroni. Biancucci resigned as president for personal reasons while retaining his role in Consoglio of Directors and a majority stake. He was replaced by Bresciani and Julian Sill was appointed general director.

On 25 November 2009 Constantini returned as coach and former player Richardo Marmugi joined Colligiana as Assistant Manager; however, in January 2010 Colliagina was ranked last and Costantini was sacked in favor of Rodolfo Vanoli, who was coaching the Reserve Udinese. There were also multiple player transfers in the winter of 2010. New players included Cristian Iannelli of Nocerina and Catania, Stefano Furno, of Benevento, Alessandro Visone of Arezzo, Giacomo Canalini of Torino, Andrea D'Amico of Catania, Thomas Lucie Smith of Potenza and Francesco Piemontese of Rovigo.

Colligiana then played Biancorssa Giacomense in play-out that resulted in two draws and exclusion from Serie D.

=== A.S.D. Colle Giovane ===
In the 2010–11 season, the club was restarted from Terza Categoria Siena with the new name A.S.D. Colle Giovane . After winning the championship, the newly formed club was promoted to Seconda Categoria Tuscany.

=== Merger with Monteriggioni ===
In the summer of 2011 the club A.S.D. Olimpia Colligiana was founded after the merger of Monteriggioni (just relegated to the Eccellenza Tuscany league) and A.S.D. Colle Giovane. In the 2011–12 season the new Colligiana played in Eccellenza Tuscany group B ranking 6th.

== Stadium ==
The sports complex is located in Via Liguria, in the Badia area, and is dedicated to Gino Manni, the player of the late thirties and early fifties. Manni played for both Serie A and Serie B clubs, coached Colligiana and other teams simultaneously, and achieved notable successes including the European record for consecutive victories.

== Chronicle ==
Chronicle of Olimpia Colligiana
- V.F. Colligiana.
- 1926–27 2ª in Group B of Third Division Tuscany.
- 1927–28 2ª in Group B of Third Division Tuscany.
- 1928–29 5ª in Group G of Second Division Tuscany.
- 1929–30 10ª in Group F of Second Division Tuscany.
- 1930–31 8ª in Group A of Second Division Tuscany

Do not join for next season.

- 1933–34 Directory VIII (Tuscany) of Second Division.
- 1945–46 – ? in Group D of the First Division Tuscany.
- 1946–47 – ? in Group ? of First Division Tuscany. Promoted to Serie C
- 1947–48 – 13ª in Group C of Serie C – Lega Centro. Admitted to Promozione Interregionale.
- 1948–49 – 11ª in Group H of Promozione.
- 1949–50 – 8ª in Group H of Promozione.
- 1950–51 – 3ª in Group H of Promozione.
- 1951–52 – 4ª in Group H of Promozione.
- 1952–53 – 16ª in Group F of IV Serie 1952-1953. Relegated to Promozione Regionale Tuscany.
- 1957–58 – 1ª of First Division Tuscany. Promoted to Serie D^{2}
- 1958–59 – 13ª in Group B phase Tuscany of Serie D. ^{1}
- 1959–60 – 3ª in Group C of First Class Tuscany.
- 1960–61 – 4ª in Group C of First Class Tuscany.
- 1961–62 – 2ª in Group C of First Class Tuscany.
- 1962–63 – 9ª in Group B of First Class Tuscany.
- 1963–64 – 12ª in Group B of First Class Tuscany.
- 1964–65 – 15ª in Group B of First Class Tuscany, downgraded because of the high goal difference with Galluzzo. Readmitted to the compilation of new seasonal paintings.
- 1965–66 – 8ª in Group C of First Class Tuscany.
- 1966–67 – 10ª in Group C of First Class Tuscany.
- 1967–68 – 11ª in Group C of First Class Tuscany, finished season in Second ClassTuscany.
- 1968–69 – 1ª in Group C of Second Class Tuscany. Promoted to First Class Tuscany.
- 1969–70 – ?ª in Group C of First Class Tuscany.
- 1970–71 – ?ª in Group C of First Class Tuscany.
- 1971–72 – ?ª in Group C of First Class Tuscany.
- 1972–73 – 1ª in Group C of First Class Tuscany. Promoted to Promozione.
- 1973–74 – 7ª in Group one of Promozione Tuscany.
- 1974–75 – 7ª in Group one of Promozione Tuscany.
- 1975–76 – 4ª in Group A of Promozione Tuscany.
- 1976–77 – 9ª in Group B of Promozione Tuscany.
- 1977–78 – 12ª in Group B of Promozione Tuscany.
- 1978–79 – 14ª in Group B of Promozione Tuscany. Finished in First Class.
- 1979–80 – ? in Group D of First Class Tuscany.
- 1980–81 – in Group C of First Class Tuscany.
- 1981–82 – in Group C of First Class Tuscany.
- 1982–83 – in Group D of First Class Tuscany.
- 1983–84 – 1ª in Group D of First Class Tuscany. Promoted to Promozione.
- 1984–85 – 6ª in Group B of Promozione Tuscany.
- 1985–86 – 1ª in Group B of Promozione Tuscany. Promoted to Interregional Championship.
- 1986–87 – 15ª in Group F of Interregional Championship. Demoted to Promozione.
- 1987–88 – 1ª in Group B of Promozione Tuscany. Promoted to Interregional Championship
- 1988–89 – 4ª in Group F Interregional Championship.
- 1989–90 – 10ª in Group F Interregional Championship.
- 1990–91 – 1ª in Group F Interregional Championship. Lost the playoff for promotion in Serie C2 at Avezzano.
- 1991–92 – 4ª in Group E of Interregional Championship.
- 1992–93 – 13ª in Group D of Serie D ^{1}
- 1993–94 – 2ª in Group A of Serie D^{1}
- 1994–95 – 5ª in Group A of Serie D^{1}
- 1995–96 – 6ª in Group A of Serie D^{1}
- 1996–97 – 6ª in Group A of Serie D^{1}
- 1997–98 – 10ª in Group E of Serie D^{1}
- 1998–99 – 6ª in Group E of Serie D^{1}
- 1999–00 – 9ª in Group E of Serie D^{1}
- 2000–01 – 13ª in Group E of Serie D^{1}
- 2001–02 – 15ª in Group F of Serie D^{1} Relegated in Eccellenza.
- 2002–03 – 6ª in Group E of Eccellenza Tuscany.
- 2003–04 – 5ª in Group B of Eccellenza Tuscany.
- 2004–05 – 5ª in Group B of Eccellenza Tuscany.
- 2005–06 – 7ª in Group B of Eccellenza Tuscany.
- 2006–07 – 1ª in Group B of Eccellenza Tuscany. Promoted to Serie D.
- 2007–08 – 2ª in Group E of Serie D. Finalist of Coppa Italia Serie D with Como. Finalist in play-off with Sambonifacese. Promoted to Seconda Divisione Lega Pro.
- 2008–09 – 12ª in Group B of Second Division.
- 2009–10 – 17ª in Group B of Second Division; Demoted from Serie D.
- 2010–11 – A.S.D. Colle Giovane 1ª in Terza Categoria Siena; Promoted from Seconda Categoria Tuscany.
- 2011–12 – A.S.D. Olimpia Colligiana sixth in Eccellenza Tuscany/B.
- 2012–13 – 1st in Eccellenza Tuscany/B. Promoted to Serie D.

- ^{1}Campionato Nazionale Dilettanti (Italy)
- ^{2}Champion of Tuscany Category, European record holder with 17 consecutive victories

== Trainers, coaches, and players ==
=== Trainers and Coaches ===
| Position | Staff |
|---|---|
| Manager | (Italy) Paolo Molfese |
| Assistant Manager | (Italy) |
| Goalkeeping Coach | (Italy) Corrado Ciolli |
| Trainers co-ordinator | (Italy) Yuri Fabbrizzi |
| Fitness Coach | (Italy) |
| Fitness Coach | (Italy) |

Last updated: 4 November 2011
Source: O. Colligiana official website

=== Famous players ===
- Franco Baldini
- Patrizio Billio
- Giorgio Bresciani
- Marco Calonaci
- Mirko Conte
- Sauro Fattori
- Gian Piero Ghio
- Giovanni Guerrini
- Gianluca Savoldi
- Luca Tognozzi

== Honours ==
Trainers
- 1926–1927 – Frigerio
- 1928–1929 – Piselli
- 1929–1930 – Zagni
- 1947–1948 – Cinzio Scagliotti
- 1949–1951 – Gino Manni
- 1951–1952 – Capaccioli
- 1957–1961 – Gino Manni
- 1962–1963 – Pinori
- 1964–1965 – Banti I°
- 1966–1967 – Burresi
- 1968–1969 – Uliano Vettori
- 1970–1971 – Romoli
- 1972–1973 – Tito Bini (replaced) – Gino Manni (substitute)
- 1980–1981 – Loris Bonini
- 1981–1982 – Massimo Gori (replaced) – Mino Soldi (substitute)
- 1983–1987 – Mauro Bettarini
- 1987–1989 – Ennio Pellegrini
- 1989–1990 – Mauro Niccolai (replaced) – Graziano Landoni (substitute)
- 1990–1992 – Piero Braglia
- 1992–1993 – Maurizio Hemmy (replaced) – Giorgio Rosadini (substitute)
- 1993–1994 – Giorgio Rosadini
- 1994–1995 – Alberto Favilla (replaced) – Fausto Landini (substitute)
- 1995–1996 – Alberto Cei (replaced) – Giorgio Rosadini (substitute)
- 1996–1998 – Giorgio Rosadini
- 1998–1999 – Ennio Pellegrini
- 1999–2000 – Franco Tintisona
- 2000–2002 – Claudio Rastelli
- 2002–2003 – Roberto Spinelli (replaced) – Riccardo Marmugi (replaced) – Salvatore Vassallo (substitute)
- 2003–2004 – Paolo Tafi (replaced) – Sauro Fattori (substitute)
- 2004–2005 – Sauro Fattori
- 2005–2006 – Sauro Fattori (replaced) – Mario Vittadello (substitute and replaced) – Sauro Fattori (substitute)
- 2006–2008 – Roberto Bicchierai
- 2008–2009 – Roberto Bicchierai (replaced) – Agatino Cuttone (substitute and replaced) – Girolamo Mesiti (substitute)
- 2009–2010 – Maurizio Costantini (replaced) – Enrico Zaccaroni (substitute and relieved) – Maurizio Costantini (recalled and relieved) – Rodolfo Vanoli

- Prima Divisione / First Division: 1

1957–58

- Prima Divisione / Regional Champion Amateur First Division

1957–58

- European record with 17 consecutive wins

1957–58

- Seconda Categoria: 1

1968–69

- Prima Categoria: 2

1972–73, 1983–84

- Promozione: 2

1985–86, 1987–88

- Serie D / Campionato Interregionale: 1

1990–91 (Group F)

- Star to contribute sport and CONI

1993

- Eccellenza: 1

2006–07 (Group B)

=== Championships played ===
Colligiana has played in 85 national and regional championships:

- = 4
- = 27
- Regional championship = 57

Colligiana played in two championships at the third national level (1928–29 and 1947–48), 15 seasons in fourth level (including Serie C2 2008–09 and 2009–10 and the various leagues and Promotion Interregional fourth series) and 27 fifth level (including the Interregional Championship either National Amateur Championship or (formerly Serie D).

== Fans ==
Organized support for Colligiana began in September 1977, thanks to Team "Guelfi Colle", which led fan efforts until 1983. Internal divisions in the 1990s were followed by the group of "Red and White Youth" (born in 1985), which still make up the organized supporters of Colligiana.

=== Rivalries and Friendships ===
==== Rivalry ====
- Colligiana's rivals are Siena and Poggibonsi.
- Poggibonsi

Poggibonsi achieved the record for highest-away match score at Colligiana with a 6–0 result in the Promotion Inter championship of 1949–1950 (including a hat-trick of goals facing Farano Valentini Agnorelli and Del Bravo for Colligiana). Poggibonsi also consistently defeated Colligiana in Serie D earning a 4–1 victory in 1996–1997, for example. The most recent friendly match between the clubs took place 20 August 2006 with a 2–0 Colligiana victory led by goals from Alessandro Bartoli and Atos Rigucci. The next match between the two clubs was in the Pro League Championship Second Division on 14 September 2008. Poggibonsi won the match 1–0 and the championship ended in a 1 to 1 draw. In the 2009–10 season the Second Division Pro League derby home leg was particularly exciting, with fewer than two goals scored by half time. Colligiana then scored four goals, evening the score after just three minutes of play and reversing the result in just 18 minutes.

- Siena

The historic rivalry with Siena derives from an old alliance between Florence and Colle di Val d'Elsa at the time of the Guelfi and ghibellini, where the two opposing factions fought in the 1269 Battle of Hill of 1269, won by Guelfa. In a match against Siena during the league IV Series 1952–53, an attendance record of 4,361 was set, and Colligiana won the match 2–1. Colligiana also beat Siena in a Serie C match, then in a friendly game in 1987. The rivalry heated up in the summer of 2000, when the city council decided to remove the lilies from a particular patch, unleashing the wrath of multiple Colligiana fans. Some citizens felt that the decision was a real "coup against the old traditions" of Colle's people, who have always considered themselves a pillar of the Florentines. Since the summer of 2000, fans of Colligiana often sing "Colle has been and will remain lily" to emphasise the perseverance of old traditions. During the friendly Colligiana-Siena rivalry of 2007, there were some moments of tension and teasing between the sides.

- A.S.D. Gracciano Colligiana have always felt a strong rivalry with Gracciano, other football team in Colle di Val d'Elsa. Gracciano was founded by Aldo Grasso in 1964, because they wanted a strong club made up only of graccianesi and "independent" from Colligiana (the "too close relations" between the two companies have often vexed Colligiana). One could say that Colle di Val d'Elsa (like all big cities) has two football clubs, though the rivalry is much more felt for Gracciano.

==== Friendships ====
- Fiorentina One stand-out friendship is with Fiorentina, from whom Colle received the red and white flag in 1927 in honour of the brotherhood between the towns of Colle and Florence. The story has it that the Marchese Luigi Ridolfi, a founder of the AC Fiorentina, had friends in Colle of Val d'Elsa and attended a Colligiana football match. After the gift of the flag, a bad wash changed the color of the stripes to purple, and that color was then officially adopted by AC Fiorentina.
- Rondinella Fans have also always been close with the Old Guard, the historic group of Ultras Rondinella.
