= Luca Tognozzi =

Italian footballer

Personal information
- Full name: Luca Tognozzi
- Date of birth: 3 October 1977 (age 49)
- Place of birth: Florence, Italy
- Height: 1.84 m (6 ft 0 in)
- Position: Midfielder

Team information
- Current team: Sorrento

Youth career
- Fiorentina

Senior career*
Years	Team	Apps	(Gls)
1996–1998	Colligiana	58	(3)
1998–1999	Castiglionese	20	(0)
1999–2000	Montevarchi	0	(0)
2000–2001	Fortis Juventus	20	(1)
2001–2003	Sansovino	52	(3)
2003–2005	Sangiovannese	61	(3)
2005–2006	Pescara	35	(2)
2006–2009	Reggina	55	(0)
2009	→ Brescia (loan)	18	(2)
2009–2011	Pescara	49	(3)
2011–2012	Sorrento	8	(0)
2012	Borgo a Buggiano	12	(1)
- * Club domestic league appearances and goals

Luca Tognozzi (born 3 October 1977) is a former Italian footballer who played as a midfielder.

== Club career ==
=== Early career ===
He began his career in the youth team at Fiorentina, but due to a lack of opportunities at this level he played for Colligiana and Castiglionese before moving to Montevarchi, who were then in the Serie C1. Unable to break into the first team he moved back to Serie D, first with Fortis Juventus, who were managed by Maurizio Sarri. He became one of the manager's favourite players and followed Sarri first to Sansovino where he helped the club to promotion from serie D to Serie C2. He then rejoined Sarri at Sangiovannese where a promotion to Serie C1 followed. Success with both of these clubs saw him move to Pescara then in Serie B where he played well for two seasons. His performances attracted the attention of bigger clubs and he was sold to Reggina, who were then in the top flight of Italian football (Serie A).

=== Reggina ===
Tognozzi made his Serie A debut on 15 October 2006 in a game against Roma which finished 1–0 to the Roman side. Tognozzi played a major role in the 2006/2007 season that saw Reggina avoid relegation to Serie B. This was a remarkable achievement considering the 11 penalty point penalty the club had incurred following the second wave of the Serie A match-fixing scandal. The following season Tognozzi started well but was injured on 21 October 2007 in the home game against Inter due to a reckless challenge by Patrick Vieira. He injured the third metatarsal of his right foot and was out for two months. When he returned to the team he soon returned to form and was again able to contribute to them avoiding relegation (the salvezza).

=== Loan to Brescia and return to Pescara ===
Tognozzi was loaned out to Brescia on 2 February 2009, which was the final day of the winter transfer window. Brescia held the rights to a first refusal on an acquisition of Tognozzi, should he perform well. This was not to be, however, and he returned to Reggina, who had just been relegated to Serie B. On 10 July 2009 he was re-signed by his old club Pescara, where he stayed until the summer of 2011 after making over 50 appearances and scoring 3 goals.

=== Reunited with Sarri: Sorrento ===
On 31 August 2011 Tognozzi signed a one-year contract for Sorrento, which reunited him with his old manager and "mentor" Maurizio Sarri, who had managed him at Pescara, Sansovino and Sangiovannese. However, on 11 January 2012 he joined Borgo a Buggiano on free transfer.
