= Graziano Landoni =

Italian footballer and manager

Personal information
- Date of birth: 24 November 1939 (age 86)
- Place of birth: Legnano, Italy
- Height: 1.79 m (5 ft 10 in)
- Position: Midfielder

Senior career*
Years	Team	Apps	(Gls)
1958–1959	Pro Vercelli		
1959–1961	Messina		
1961–1964	Lazio		
1964–1965	Atalanta		
1965–1966	Catania		
1966–1971	Palermo		
1969	→ Ternana (loan)		
1971	Piacenza		
1971–1972	Sorrento		
1972–1973	Grosseto		

Managerial career
- Grosseto
- Arezzo
- Pisa
- Prato
- 1978: Parma
- Benevento
- Siracusa
- 1984: Palermo
- Foggia
- Trapani
- Ercolanese
- Colligiana
- Grosseto
- * Club domestic league appearances and goals

Graziano Landoni (born 24 November 1939) is an Italian football midfielder and later manager.
