= Luigi Robbiati =

Italian footballer

Personal information
- Date of birth: 18 June 1935 (age 91)
- Place of birth: Robbiate, Italy
- Position: Defender

Senior career*
Years	Team	Apps	(Gls)
1954–1956	Internazionale	1	(0)
1957–1958	Prato	18	(0)
1958–1959	Internazionale	2	(0)
1959–1960	Siracusa	34	(0)
1960–1961	Palermo	0	(0)
1961–1962	Reggiana	22	(0)
1962–1964	Cesena	14	(0)
1964–1966	Saronno		
1966–1968	Sporting Reggio Emilia		
- * Club domestic league appearances and goals

Luigi Robbiati (born 18 June 1935 in Robbiate) is an Italian former footballer who played as a defender in Serie A for Internazionale in the 1950s.

His son Anselmo Robbiati played in Serie A for Fiorentina.
