= Eccellenza Tuscany =

- Organising body: Lega Nazionale Dilettanti
- Founded: 1991
- Country: Italy
- Confederation: UEFA
- Divisions: 2
- Number of clubs: 32
- Promotion to: Serie D
- Relegation to: Promozione Tuscany
- League cup: Coppa Italia Dilettanti
- Current champions: Camaiore (Group A); Scandicci (Group B) (2024–25)
- Most championships: Sangimignano, Viareggio (3 titles)
- Website: http://www.lnd.it

Eccellenza Tuscany (Italian: Eccellenza Toscana) is the regional Eccellenza football division for clubs in Tuscany, Italy. It is competed amongst 37 teams, in three different groups (A, B and C). The winners of the Groups compete together in final round robin, and the first and second teams are promoted to Serie D. The club who finishes third, along with the second placed teams in the regular season, also have the chance to gain promotion, as they are entered into a national play-off which consists of two rounds.

== Champions ==
Here are the past champions of the Tuscany Eccellenza, organised into their respective group.

=== Group A ===
- 1991–92 Livorno
- 1992–93 Sangiovannese
- 1993–94 Torrelaghese
- 1994–95 Viareggio
- 1995–96 Pietrasanta
- 1996–97 Venturina
- 1997–98 Cascina
- 1998–99 Cerretese
- 1999–2000 Larcianese
- 2000–01 Cappiano Romaiano 1945
- 2001–02 Massese
- 2002–03 Armando Picchi
- 2003–04 Cecina
- 2004–05 Pontedera
- 2005–06 Viareggio
- 2006–07 Gavorrano
- 2007–08 Mobilieri Ponsacco
- 2008–09 Rosignano
- 2009–10 Tuttocuoio
- 2010–11 Pistoiese
- 2011–12 Lucca
- 2012–13 Jolly e Montemurlo
- 2013–14 Ponsacco
- 2014–15 Viareggio 2014
- 2015–16 Forte dei Marmi
- 2016–17 Seravezza
- 2017–18 Sangimignano
- 2018–19 Grosseto
- 2019–20 Pro Livorno Sorgenti
- 2020–21 Cascina
- 2021–22 Tau Altopascio
- 2022–23 Cenaia
- 2023–24 Tuttocuoio
- 2024–25 Camaiore

=== Group B ===
- 1993–94 Impruneta Tavarnuzze
- 1994–95 Virtus Chianciano
- 1995–96 Barberino M.
- 1996–97 Castelfiorentino
- 1997–98 Sangimignano
- 1998–99 Lanciotto Campi Bisenzio
- 1999–2000 Fortis Juventus
- 2000–01 Sansovino
- 2001–02 Chiusi
- 2002–03 Calenzano
- 2003–04 Poggibonsi
- 2004–05 Sangimignano
- 2005–06 Figline
- 2006–07 Colligiana
- 2007–08 Calenzano
- 2008–09 Monteriggioni
- 2009–10 Pianese
- 2010–11 Lanciotto
- 2011–12 FiesoleCaldine
- 2012–13 Olimpia Colligiana
- 2013–14 San Donato Tavarnelle
- 2014–15 Montecatini
- 2015–16 Rignanese
- 2016–17 Montevarchi Aquila
- 2017–18 Aglianese
- 2018–19 Grassina
- 2019–20 Badesse
- 2020–21 Poggibonsi
- 2021–22 Livorno
- 2022–23 Figline
- 2023–24 Siena
- 2024–25 Scandicci
