= Riccardo Taddei =

Italian footballer (born 1980)

Personal information
- Date of birth: 5 September 1980 (age 46)
- Place of birth: Vecchiano, Italy
- Height: 1.75 m (5 ft 9 in)
- Position: Forward

Team information
- Current team: Pisa (Assistant manager)

Senior career*
Years	Team	Apps	(Gls)
1997–1999	Pontedera	3	(0)
1999–2002	AC Fiorentina	5	(0)
2002–2003	Genoa	3	(0)
2003–2007	Cremonese	64	(18)
2007–2011	Brescia	40	(9)
2011	Triestina	14	(3)
2011–2012	Casale	27	(15)
2012–2013	Rimini	22	(7)
2013–2015	Alessandria	44	(8)
2015–2016	Catanzaro	14	(0)
Total		236	(60)

Managerial career
- 2016–2017: Bassano Virtus (assistant)
- 2017–2018: Casertana (assistant)
- 2018–: Pisa (assistant)
- * Club domestic league appearances and goals

Riccardo Taddei (born 5 September 1980) is an Italian football manager and former player, who played as a forward. He is currently serving as the assistant manager of Pisa, under head coach Luca D'Angelo.

== Playing career ==
Taddei was born in Vecchiano. He started his career at Pontedera, a club based in the Province of Pisa. He was then signed by AC Fiorentina as back-up for forwards Nuno Gomes, Enrico Chiesa, Gabriel Batistuta, and Leandro Amaral. He made his Serie A debut on 6 November 1999 against Cagliari Calcio, collecting five league appearances during his three seasons with the team. He also played once in the 2001–02 UEFA Cup.

After the relegation and bankruptcy of Fiorentina, in 2002, he was signed by Genoa of Serie B on a free transfer. He failed to gain regular playing time with the team, however, and subsequently joined Cremonese of Serie C2, with whom won promotion to Serie C1 as the runner-up of Group A in 2003–04. During the 2004–05 season, he won promotion again, this time as the champion of Serie C1 Group A. During the 2005–06 season, however, he did not play any games for the club in Serie B. After Cremonese were relegated at the end of the season, he played seven more times for the team during the 2006–07 Serie C1 season. In August 2007, he moved to Brescia of Serie B.

After only making three appearances for Brescia in the Italian top flight during the first half of the 2010–11 season, in January 2011, he joined U.S. Triestina Calcio.

In July 2011 he joined A.S. Casale Calcio.

The following season he moved to Rimini. In the summer of 2013 he signed a two-year contract with Alessandria. He ended his career with Catanzaro, after becoming a free agent at the conclusion of the 2015–16 season.

== Managerial career ==
For the 2016–17 season, Taddei joined the coaching staff of Bassano Virtus manager Luca D'Angelo, in the role of assistant coach. After D'Angelo's dismissal in 2017, he left the club, and retained his post as the former's assistant manager at Casertana, and subsequently Pisa in 2018; with the latter side, they obtained promotion to Serie B during the 2018–19 season.

== Style of play ==
A creative left–footed forward or midfielder, with excellent technical skills, Taddei usually played as a second striker or as an attacking midfielder, although he was also capable of playing as a left winger. Despite the talent that he displayed in his youth, his career was affected by several injuries, which impeded him from establishing himself at the top level.

== Honours ==
=== Player ===
Fiorentina

- Coppa Italia winner: 2000–01
- Supercoppa Italiana runner-up: 2001

Cremonese

- Serie C2 (Group A) Runner-up: 2003–04
- Serie C2 Promotion playoff winner: 2003–04
- Serie C1 (Group A) Champions: 2004–05
