= Enrico Chiesa =

Italian footballer (born 1970)

Personal information
- Date of birth: 29 December 1970 (age 55)
- Place of birth: Genoa, Italy
- Height: 1.76 m (5 ft 9 in)
- Position: Striker

Youth career
- 1986–1987: Pontedecimo

Senior career*
Years	Team	Apps	(Gls)
1988–1990	Sampdoria	1	(0)
1990–1991	Teramo	31	(5)
1991–1992	Chieti	24	(6)
1992–1993	Sampdoria	26	(1)
1993–1994	Modena	36	(15)
1994–1995	Cremonese	34	(14)
1995–1996	Sampdoria	27	(22)
1996–1999	Parma	92	(33)
1999–2002	Fiorentina	59	(34)
2002–2003	Lazio	12	(2)
2003–2008	Siena	129	(32)
2008–2010	Figline	32	(7)
Total		503	(171)

International career
1996–2001	Italy	17	(7)

Managerial career
- 2010: Figline
- * Club domestic league appearances and goals

Enrico Chiesa (Italian pronunciation: [enˈriːko ˈkjɛːza; ˈkjeːza]; born 29 December 1970) is an Italian football coach and former striker.

Chiesa played for several Italian clubs throughout his career, and performed regularly in Serie A for over a decade, winning titles with Sampdoria, Parma, and Fiorentina; he later also spent a spell with Lazio. He moved to Siena where he became a household name and, thanks to his goals, the Tuscan side stayed in the top division for many seasons. Chiesa retired with Figline in 2010, the club with which he subsequently began his coaching career. He won the 1998–99 UEFA Cup and Coppa Italia with Parma, finishing the former tournament as the top scorer, with 8 goals. At international level, Chiesa played for the Italy national team on 17 occasions between 1996 and 2001, scoring 7 goals, and was also part of the Italian squads that took part at UEFA Euro 1996 and the 1998 FIFA World Cup.

== Club career ==
Born in Genoa, Chiesa made his early playing footsteps at amateur club Pontedecimo (1986–87). He then moved to Sampdoria, for which he made his debut on 16 April 1989 in a 1–0 loss at Roma in the 1988–89 Serie A. He then played for Teramo of Serie C2 and successively Chieti of Serie C1 before returning to Sampdoria in 1992. Failing to impress, he then joined Modena in Serie B for the 1993–94 season, and later Cremonese during the 1994–95 season, where he scored 14 goals in their Serie A campaign. In 1995, he returned again with the blucerchiati, forming a notable attacking duo with Roberto Mancini, and scoring 22 goals in 27 matches in Serie A.

In 1996, he was signed by rising club Parma, and contributed to his team's second-place finish behind Juventus, scoring 14 goals in the Serie A during his first season at the club. The second-place result allowed Parma to qualify for the UEFA Champions League the following season. With Parma, Chiesa won a UEFA Cup, a Coppa Italia, and a Supercoppa Italiana during the highly successful 1998–99 season, in which Parma also finished in fourth place in the Serie A. Chiesa became one of the best strikers in Italian football (when not injured). During his time at the club, he also formed a successful partnership with Argentine star striker Hernán Crespo, as the duo averaged 10–15 goals a season each. They also each scored in the 1999 UEFA Cup Final victory over Marseille, a competition in which Chiesa finished top scorer, with 8 goals.

In 1999, he was signed by Fiorentina for 28 billion lire (€14.46 million), a team looking to expand and bring in better players, in an attempt to keep club captain and talisman Gabriel Batistuta. Despite making regular appearances in his first season for La Viola, Chiesa was fighting for a place with Predrag Mijatović among others, and also had spells where he was out of form, and in the end only managed 6 goals in the League. In the 2000–01 season, Batistuta left for Roma and Fiorentina were plagued with injuries and financial problems. Meanwhile, Chiesa became the main striker for the club under manager Roberto Mancini, supported by playmaker Rui Costa, and scored 22 goals in 30 matches, finishing amongst the top 5 highest scorers in the league and helping Fiorentina to win the 2000–01 Coppa Italia over his former club, Parma, in the final; in the second leg at home, he set up Nuno Gomes's goal in a 1–1 draw, which allowed Fiorentina to clinch the title 2–1 on aggregate. The 2001–02 campaign proved to be a very difficult one: Chiesa started the campaign off strongly, scoring five goals in the first five matches of the season, but was ruled out for the rest of the season after sustaining a serious injury to his knee ligaments against Venezia on matchday five; left without Chiesa to lead the club's attack, Fiorentina were ultimately relegated at the end of the season. As a result of Fiorentina's relegation and financial troubles, Chiesa subsequently moved to Lazio for the following season, where he however failed to play at his personal best.

In 2003, he joined Siena, where he became a fan favourite and a key player in the club's Serie A history, impressively reaching double scoring figures in Serie A during his first three seasons at the club. Despite a very poor 2006–07 season in which Chiesa was not able to score a single goal in Serie A, he was backed by the club and new trainer Andrea Mandorlini, who explicitly stated that he felt that Chiesa was still important to the team, and that he expected at least 15 goals from him in their 2007–08 Serie A campaign. However, he played only twice, scoring no goals once again, before he was signed by Figline of the Lega Pro Second Division. He scored five goals with Figline, thus giving his contribution to the team's promotion to the Lega Pro Prima Divisione. In the following season, his last as a footballer, he played a limited number of games due to suffering a fractured leg, an injury which forced him to stay out of contention for most of the season.

== International career ==
Chiesa played for the Italian team from 1996 to 2001, collecting a total of 22 caps with 7 goals. Chiesa made his senior international debut in a 2–2 friendly draw against Belgium on 29 May 1996 in Cremona, marking the occasion with a goal. He was subsequently selected by manager Arrigo Sacchi to play for Italy at the UEFA Euro 1996 tournament later that year, ahead of other established strikers such as Roberto Baggio, Gianluca Vialli, and Giuseppe Signori. Chiesa appeared in two group stage matches, the first in a 2–1 defeat against the Czech Republic, where he scored Italy's only goal of the match, and the second in a 0–0 draw against Germany, as Italy were eliminated in the first round.

He also was called up to the 1998 FIFA World Cup by manager Cesare Maldini as a replacement for Fabrizio Ravanelli. He appeared in Italy's opening group match of the 1998 World Cup, which ended in a 2–2 draw against Chile, also appearing as a substitute in the 1–0 victory in the round of 16 match against Norway. Italy were eliminated in the quarter-finals on penalties by hosts and eventual champions France. Under manager Dino Zoff, Chiesa appeared in Italy's 6–2 friendly win over the FIFA World Stars on 16 December 1998, organised to commemorate the centenary of the Italian Football Federation, scoring a hat-trick. He also scored a goal in a 4–0 victory over Wales in a European qualifying match in Bologna, on 5 June 1999. He made his final appearance for Italy under Giovanni Trapattoni, in Italy's 1–0 friendly win over South Africa in Perugia, on 25 April 2001.

Alongside Alessandro Del Piero, Chiesa holds the unique record for the most goals scored by an Italian international coming off the bench (5). He is also the most recent player to manage two goals in his first two Italy appearances.

== Style of play ==
In the mid-1990s, Chiesa was considered to be a top-class forward in Italy’s football league. As a player, he mainly played as an attacking supporting forward in all his career but due to his versatility and skills, he could also play as an auxiliary forward or as a wing. It was his skills and vision that helped him create chances and score goals.

Possessing pace, stamina, good offensive movement, and a powerful and accurate shot with either foot from both inside and outside the box, he excelled during counter-attacks, and was known for his ability to make attacking runs into the area, and quickly strike the ball first time while on the run; he was also equally known for his ability to score with powerful or bending strikes from free-kicks, and is the joint ninth-highest goalscorer of all time from free kicks in Serie A, with 13 goals, alongside Michel Platini and Álvaro Recoba. Fabio Capello described Chiesa as a complete forward, and as a cross between Gigi Riva and Paolo Rossi, due to his opportunism, anticipation, and excellent striking ability, which enabled him to excel acrobatically in the air, and execute spectacular volleys. In addition to his goalscoring ability as a footballer, he was also known for his dedication, professionalism and his correct behaviour on the pitch, although, despite his reputation, his career was affected by several injuries.

== Coaching career ==
In June 2010, it was announced that Chiesa was appointed the new head coach of Figline for the 2010–11 season. The experience, however, lasted a very short time, as Figline was excluded from the Italian leagues in July.

== Personal life ==
Chiesa's son, Federico, is also a footballer who currently plays for Premier League side Liverpool.

== Career statistics ==
=== Club ===
Appearances and goals by club, season and competition
Club	Season	League			Coppa Italia		Europe		Other		Total	
Club	Season	Division	Apps	Goals	Apps	Goals	Apps	Goals	Apps	Goals	Apps	Goals
Sampdoria	1988–89	Serie A	1	0	0	0	—		—		1	0
Sampdoria	1989–90	Serie A	0	0	0	0	0	0	0	0	0	0
Sampdoria	Total		1	0	0	0	0	0	0	0	1	0
Teramo	1990–91	Serie C	31	5	—		—		—		31	5
Chieti	1991–92	Serie C	24	6	—		—		—		24	6
Sampdoria	1992–93	Serie A	26	1	—		—		—		26	1
Modena	1993–94	Serie B	36	15	1	0	—		—		37	15
Cremonese	1994–95	Serie A	34	14	4	0	—		—		38	14
Sampdoria	1995–96	Serie A	27	22	—		—		—		27	22
Parma	1996–97	Serie A	29	14	0	0	2 (Note: Appearances in UEFA Cup)	2	—		31	16
Parma	1997–98	Serie A	33	10	7	5	8 (Note: Appearances in UEFA Champions League)	6	—		48	21
Parma	1998–99	Serie A	30	9	8	1	8	8	—		46	18
Parma	Total		92	33	15	6	18	16	0	0	125	55
Fiorentina	1999–2000	Serie A	24	7	4	1	11	4	—		39	12
Fiorentina	2000–01	Serie A	30	22	6	5	2	0	—		38	27
Fiorentina	2001–02	Serie A	5	5	0	0	2	1	1 (Note: Appearance in Supercoppa Italiana)	0	8	6
Fiorentina	Total		59	34	10	6	15	5	1	0	85	45
Lazio	2002–03	Serie A	12	2	6	1	11	4	—		29	7
Siena	2003–04	Serie A	30	10	1	0	—		—		31	10
Siena	2004–05	Serie A	36	11	0	0	—		—		36	11
Siena	2005–06	Serie A	38	11	2	1	—		—		40	12
Siena	2006–07	Serie A	23	0	2	0	—		—		25	0
Siena	2007–08	Serie A	2	0	0	0	—		—		2	0
Siena	Total		129	32	5	1	0	0	0	0	134	33
Career total			471	164	41	14	44	25	1	0	557	203

=== International ===
Appearances and goals by national team and year (Note: 4 goals in 16 appearances according to some sources, although the FIGC recognises three goals Chiesa scored in a 6–2 friendly home win against the FIFA World XI on 16 December 1998, in Rome.)
National team	Year	Apps	Goals
Italy	1996	5	3
Italy	1997	1	0
Italy	1998	5	3
Italy	1999	5	1
Italy	2001	1	0
Total		17	7

== Honours ==
Sampdoria

- European Cup Winners' Cup: 1989–90

Parma

- Coppa Italia: 1998–99
- UEFA Cup: 1998–99

Fiorentina

- Coppa Italia: 2000–01
- Supercoppa Italiana runner-up: 2001

Figline

- Lega Pro Seconda Divisione: 2008–09
- Supercoppa di Lega Seconda Divisione: 2008–09

Individual

- Guerin d'Oro: 1996
- UEFA Cup top scorer: 1998–99 (8 goals)
