= APD Sangimignano =

Italian football club

A.P.D. Sangimignano
- Full name: Associazione Polisportiva Dilettantistica Sangimignano
- Nickname(s): –
- Ground: Stadio Santa Lucia, San Gimignano, Italy
- Capacity: 1,500
- President: Simone Nogara
- Manager: Fabio Ercolino
- League: Serie D
- 2017–18: Eccellenza Tuscany, 1st (promoted)
Home colours	Away colours

A.P.D. Sangimignano is an Italian association football club located in San Gimignano, Tuscany. The club currently plays in Serie D. Their colours are black and green.
