= Supercoppa di Lega di Seconda Divisione =

- Founded: 2006
- Abolished: 2014
- Region: Italy
- Teams: 3 (2006–11); 2 (2012–14)
- Last champions: Bassano Virtus (2013–14)

The Supercoppa di Lega di Seconda Divisione was an Italian football competition played initially by the three group winners of the Lega Pro Seconda Divisione, formerly Serie C2. It was contested from the 2005–06 season until the 2013–14 season with the abolishment of Lega di Seconda Divisione and foundation of Lega Pro.

== Past winners ==
=== Seasons from 2005–06 to 2010–11 ===
| Season | Winner | Runner-up | 3rd placed |
|---|---|---|---|
| 2005–06 | Cavese | Gallipoli | Venezia |
| 2006–07 | Sorrento | Legnano | Foligno |
| 2007–08 | Reggiana | Benevento | Pergocrema |
| 2008–09 | Figline | Varese | Cosenza |
| 2009–10 | Lucchese | Juve Stabia | Südtirol |
| 2010–11 | Tritium | Carpi | Latina |

=== Seasons from 2011–12 to 2013–14 ===
| Season | Winner | Runner-up |
|---|---|---|
| 2011–12 | Perugia | Treviso |
| 2012–13 | Salernitana | Pro Patria |
| 2013–14 | Bassano Virtus | Messina |

== Matches ==
=== 2005–06 ===
- Venezia – Cavese 1–2
- Cavese – Gallipoli 1–1
- Gallipoli – Venezia 0–0

=== 2006–07 ===
- Legnano – Foligno 1–0
- Foligno – Sorrento 0–0
- Sorrento – Legnano 1–0

=== 2007–08 ===
- Reggiana – Benevento 2–1
- Benevento – Pergocrema 2–0
- Pergocrema – Reggiana 0–1

=== 2008–09 ===
- Varese – Figline 2–2
- Cosenza – Varese 1–2
- Figline – Cosenza 3–0

=== 2009–10 ===
- Juve Stabia – Südtirol 2–1
- Südtirol – Lucchese 0–3
- Lucchese – Juve Stabia 4–2

=== 2010–11 ===
- Latina – Tritium 0–1
- Carpi – Latina 1–0
- Tritium – Carpi 0–0

=== 2011–12 ===
- Treviso – Perugia 1–2
- Perugia – Treviso 0–1

=== 2012–13 ===
- Pro Patria – Salernitana 0–3
- Salernitana – Pro Patria 2–1

=== 2013–14 ===
- Bassano Virtus – Messina 2–0
- Messina – Bassano Virtus 1–2

== See also ==
- Lega Pro Seconda Divisione
- Supercoppa di Lega di Prima Divisione
- Football in Italy
