= Figline 1965 =

Italian football club

Giallo-Blu Figline
- Full name: Associazione Sportiva Dilettantistica Giallo-Blu Figline
- Founded: 1965; 2010 (refounded)
- Ground: Stadio Goffredo Del Buffa, Figline Valdarno, Italy
- Capacity: 1,500
- Chairman: Federico Bagattini & Alessandro Nesta
- Manager: Manolo Ermini (Jacob Jamblichus ‘Captain’)
- League: Eccellenza
- 2011–12: Eccellenza Toscana group B, 3rd
| Home colours | Away colours |

A.S.D. Giallo-Blu Figline is an Italian association football club located in Figline Valdarno, Tuscany. It currently plays in Eccellenza Toscana group B.

== History ==
=== A.S. Calcio Figline ===
Founded in 1965, Figline played in the amateur leagues until 2006, when it was promoted to Serie D. It won a second promotion as 2007–08 Serie D/E champions, thus attaining a spot in the Lega Pro Seconda Divisione for the 2008–09 season; both promotions came with Leonardo Semplici as head coach and attacking midfielder Anselmo Robbiati, formerly of Internazionale and Fiorentina, as captain.

In their first professional campaign, the Tuscans were joined by another player with past and significant Serie A experience, former Fiorentina, Siena and Italy international Enrico Chiesa. The season immediately saw Figline as a serious contender for the league title, and on 10 May, despite losing 1–0 in a Tuscan derby to Colligiana, Figline mathematically won the 2008–09 Lega Pro Seconda Divisione – B title in a second consecutive triumph for the gialloblu, who subsequently attempted to join Lega Pro Prima Divisione in the 2009–10 season but were refused entry due to large debts. The club was subsequently declared inactive to the FIGC.

=== A.S.D. Giallo-Blu Figline ===
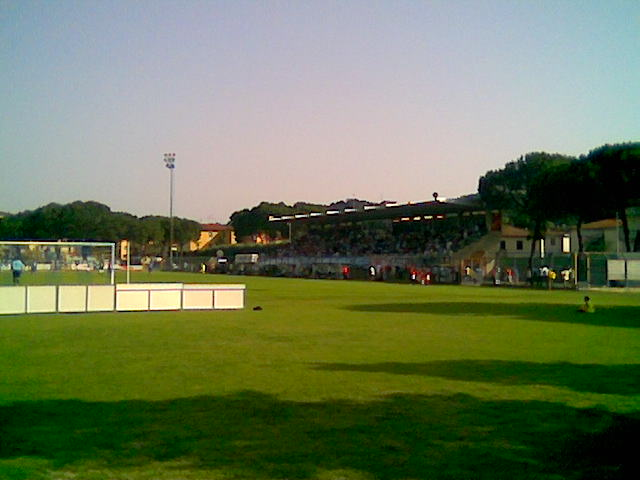
Stadio Del Buffa, Giallo-Blu Figline's home stadium

In August 2010, with support from its municipality, A.S.D. Giallo-Blu Figline was formed as the city's new team. Since the 2010–11 season it has played in Eccellenza Toscana group B.

== Stadium ==
Figline play their home matches at Stadio Comunale Goffredo Del Buffa, which has a capacity of approximately 1,500.

== Colors and badge ==
Their colors are yellow and blue.
