= Sławomir Olszewski =

Polish footballer (born 1973)

Personal information
- Date of birth: 26 August 1973 (age 53)
- Place of birth: Nowy Sącz, Poland
- Height: 1.88 m (6 ft 2 in)
- Position: Goalkeeper

Senior career*
Years	Team	Apps	(Gls)
1988–1994	Sandecja Nowy Sącz		
1995	Stal Mielec		
1996–1997	Unia Tarnów		
1998–2001	Widzew Łódź	52	(0)
2001–2003	Pogoń Szczecin	41	(0)
2003–2010	Cracovia	54	(0)
2011	Poprad Muszyna	2	(0)
2012	Dunajec/Start Nowy Sącz		
2013–2018	Victoria Witowice Dolne		
- * Club domestic league appearances and goals

Sławomir Olszewski (born 26 August 1973) is a Polish former professional footballer who played as a goalkeeper.
