= Roberto Baronio =

Italian footballer (born 1977)

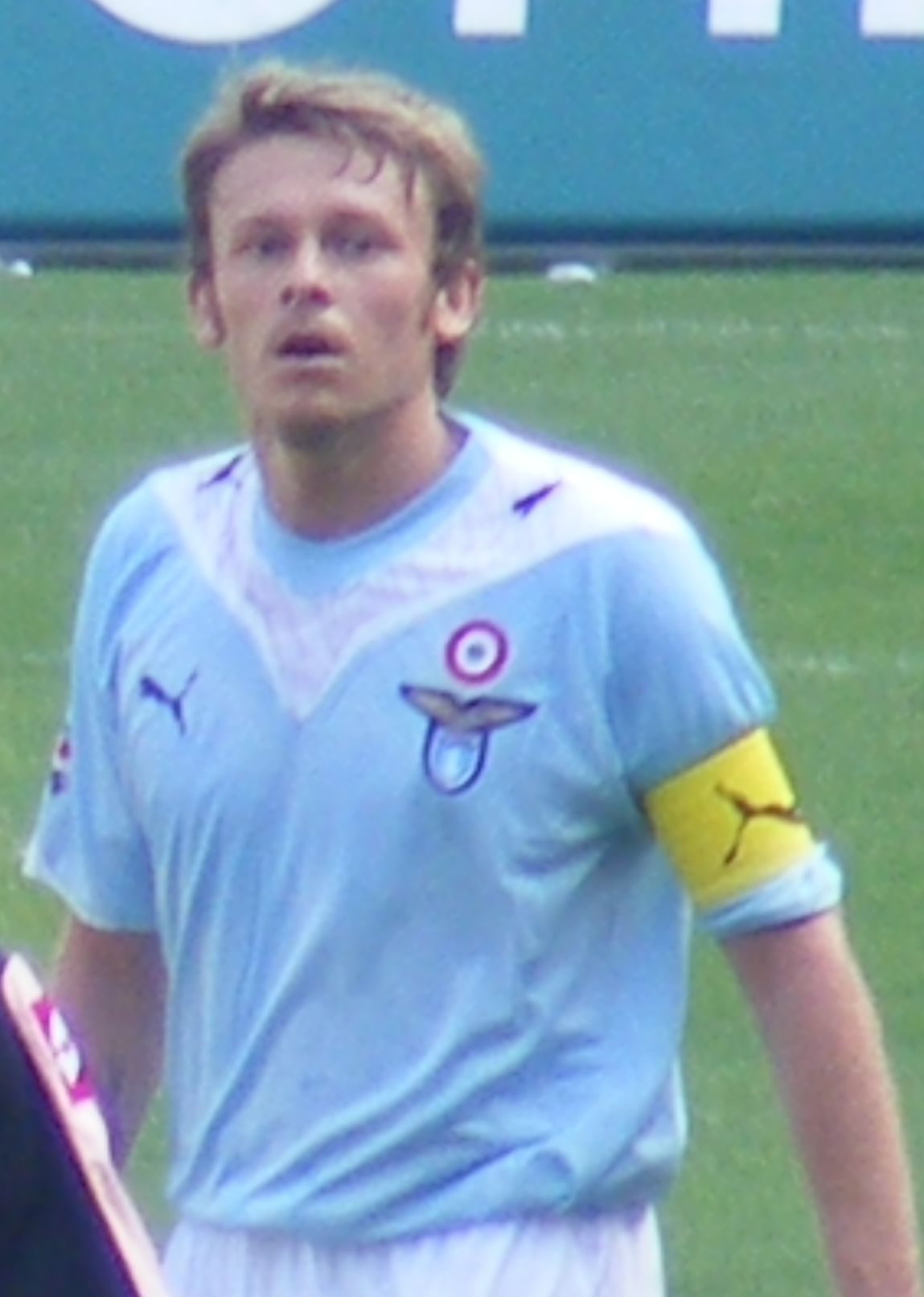
- Baronio with Lazio in 2009

Personal information
- Date of birth: 11 December 1977 (age 48)
- Place of birth: Manerbio, Italy
- Height: 1.75 m (5 ft 9 in)
- Position: Defensive midfielder

Youth career
- Voluntas Brescia
- –1994: Brescia

Senior career*
Years	Team	Apps	(Gls)
1994–1996	Brescia	33	(1)
1996–2010	Lazio	84	(0)
1997–1998	→ Vicenza (loan)	13	(0)
1999–2000	→ Reggina (loan)	31	(3)
2001–2002	→ Fiorentina (loan)	21	(1)
2002–2003	→ Perugia (loan)	11	(0)
2003–2005	→ Chievo (loan)	50	(1)
2006	→ Udinese (loan)	10	(0)
2008–2009	→ Brescia (loan)	29	(2)
2010–2011	Atletico Roma	17	(1)
Total		299	(9)

International career
1995	Italy U17	7	(1)
1995–1996	Italy U18	7	(1)
1995–2000	Italy U21	24	(4)
1995–2000	Italy U23	4	(1)
2000	Italy Olympic	3	(1)
2005	Italy	1	(0)

Managerial career
- 2015–2016: Italy U18
- 2016–2017: Italy U19
- 2017–2018: Brescia U19
- 2018–2020: Napoli U19
- 2020–2021: Juventus (assistant)
- 2022–2023: Fatih Karagümrük (assistant)
- 2023–2024: Sampdoria (assistant)
- 2025-: Dubai United
Medal record
Men's football
Representing Italy
UEFA European Under-21 Championship
Winner	2000 Slovakia
Mediterranean Games
Winner	1997 Italy
- * Club domestic league appearances and goals

Roberto Baronio (Italian pronunciation: [roˈbɛrto baˈrɔːnjo]; born 11 December 1977) is an Italian former professional footballer who played as a defensive midfielder.

He played in the position of deep-lying playmaker, where excelled due to his technical ability, vision, passing, and physical attributes, despite his lack of pace; he also possessed an accurate shot from distance and he was an accurate set-piece taker. Despite his talent, he failed to live up to his potential later in his career.

== Club career ==
Born in Manerbio, Baronio is a youth product of his hometown club Brescia. He made his Serie A debut in 1995, against Bari.

In 1996, he was bought by Lazio, and loaned out to Vicenza. He did not become a regular at Vicenza and returned to Lazio, who once again sent him on loan to gain experience. This time he was sent south to Reggina where, along with Andrea Pirlo, he was a key protagonist in their Serie A survival.

In 2000, he was awarded the title of Serie A Young Footballer of the Year.

Following his spell in Calabria, Baronio was sent to Fiorentina, and continued to develop, firmly considered one of Italy's brightest young talents; yet, he was unable to find a place in the Lazio squad, which at the time was achieving notable success both domestically and internationally.

In 2002, Baronio was sent to Perugia, where he had a poor year in a side which was relegated to Serie B. Baronio then headed to Chievo and Udinese where he became a regular and began to show signs of becoming the elite footballer many expected. This culminated in a return to Lazio, as well as a debut with Marcello Lippi's Azzurri in 2005.

Baronio failed however, to seal a place in the national team, missing the World Cup and he also failed to establish himself as a regular at Lazio, with Cristian Ledesma filling the void left by Fabio Liverani.

Offered a loan spell in La Liga with Levante, Baronio instead refused and opted to try and force his way into the Lazio side. He never managed to achieve this, however and is regarded as an unfulfilled talent.

Baronio was sent on loan to hometown club Brescia, for the 2008–09 season, and was a key player in the rondinelle's promotion push, ultimately losing to Livorno in the playoffs. At the end of the season, he returned to Lazio with the intention to reclaim a first team place following the departure of coach Delio Rossi and the appointment of new boss Davide Ballardini, who promptly presented him as a regular in the successful 2009 Supercoppa Italiana game against Inter and later also in the following Serie A league games, partially due to Ledesma was frozen by the club for contract dispute. After the dismissal of Ballardini and the appointment of Edy Reja as new head coach, Baronio found again limited space in the first team and left Lazio on 30 June 2010 after his contract expired.

In September 2010 Lega Pro Prima Divisione club Atletico Roma announced to have signed Baronio on a free transfer. At the end of the season, he became a free agent without a team, after his club went bankrupt, and he retired from football in 2011.

== International career ==
Baronio first represented Italy with the under-17 and under-18 sides (now called under-18 and under-19 due to name change of the UEFA tournament in 2001, to reflect the age limit at the end of season instead of the age limit as the start of season) .

In 1997, he was part of Under-23 side that won the Mediterranean Games and also won the 2000 UEFA European Under-21 Football Championship with the Under-21 team led by Marco Tardelli; later that year, he also took part at the 2000 Summer Olympics.

In 2005, Baronio was called up by the Italy national team manager at the time, Marcello Lippi. He made his senior debut in a summer tournament in the USA against Ecuador on 11 June, in what remains his only Azzurri appearance to date.

== Coaching career ==
After receiving his coaching badges in 2015, he was named as the Italy U-18 head coach, as well as Paolo Vanoli's assistant to the Italy U-19. He was successively promoted as head of the Italy U-19 team in August 2016.

He left the national team in 2017, and subsequently was named in charge of the Under-19 team of his former club Brescia. He left Brescia in July 2018 to become the new Under-19 youth coach of Napoli. On 20 January 2020, Napoli sacked Baronio 5 consecutive defeats between league and cup.

In August 2020, Baronio was hired as a part of newly appointed Juventus head coach Andrea Pirlo's backroom staff. His role was defined as technical collaborator. He successively joined Pirlo on his following coaching stints at Fatih Karagümrük, Sampdoria and United FC (Dubai).

== Honours ==
Vicenza

- Supercoppa Italiana runner-up: 1997

Lazio

- Supercoppa Italiana: 1998, 2000, 2009
- UEFA Cup Winners' Cup: 1998–99

Fiorentina

- Supercoppa Italiana runner-up: 2001

Italy U21

- UEFA European Under-21 Championship: 2000

Italy U23

- Mediterranean Games: 1997

Individual

- Serie A Young Footballer of the Year: 2000
