= Orlando Fanasca =

Italian former footballer

Personal information
- Date of birth: 21 February 1983 (age 43)
- Place of birth: Marino, Italy
- Height: 1.81 m (5 ft 11 in)
- Position: Midfielder

Senior career*
Years	Team	Apps	(Gls)
2001–2002	Fiorentina	1	(0)
2002–2003	Cisco Roma	29	(3)
2003–2007	Ternana	15	(2)
2006	→ Grosseto (loan)	8	(0)
2007–2008	Cisco Roma	6	(0)
2008	Paganese	15	(1)
2008–2009	Pistoiese	12	(1)
2009	Paganese	17	(2)
2009–2010	Barletta	20	(3)
2010–2012	Marino		
Total		123	(12)
- * Club domestic league appearances and goals

Orlando Fanasca (born 21 February 1983) is an Italian former footballer who played, as a midfielder, for Polisportiva Monti Cimini.

He played one game in the Serie A during his debut 2001–02 Serie A season for AC Fiorentina.

After being released by his last fully professional club Barletta, in 2010, Fanasca joined his hometown club, Marino, of Eccellenza Lazio (6th highest level of Italy) in December 2010. He finished as the runner-up of Coppa Italia Dilettanti, and was promoted to 2011–12 Serie D due to the winner, U.S. Ancona 1905, also winning their league title. Fanasca renewed his contract at the start of the season.
