= Fabio Rossitto =

Italian footballer (born 1971)

Personal information
- Date of birth: 21 September 1971 (age 55)
- Place of birth: Aviano, Italy
- Height: 1.78 m (5 ft 10 in)
- Position: Midfielder

Team information
- Current team: Chions (manager)

Senior career*
Years	Team	Apps	(Gls)
1989–1997	Udinese	187	(4)
1997–1999	Napoli	53	(2)
1999–2002	Fiorentina	47	(0)
2002–2004	Udinese	24	(0)
2004–2005	Germinal Beerschot	10	(0)
2005	Venezia	9	(1)
2005–2007	Sacilese	–	(–)

International career
1994	Italy U21	9	(0)
1996	Italy	1	(0)

Managerial career
- 2013: Pordenone
- 2013–2014: Triestina
- 2014–2015: Pordenone
- 2016: Cremonese
- 2017: Palermo (assistant)
- 2018: Pordenone
- 2019–2020: Manzanese
- 2020–: Chions
Medal record
Men's football
Representing Italy
UEFA European Under-21 Championship
Winner	1994 France
- * Club domestic league appearances and goals

Fabio Rossitto (Italian pronunciation: [ˈfaːbjo rosˈsitto]; born 21 September 1971) is an Italian football manager and a former player who played as a midfielder from 1989 to 2007.

== Club career ==
Born in Aviano, Province of Pordenone, Rossitto's career saw him play for a number of Italian and one foreign club during his eighteen-year spell as a player. He began his career with Udinese (1989–1997 and 2002–2004), where he spent a large part of his career, becoming an import part of the side. He later moved to Napoli (1997–1999), Fiorentina (1999–2002), Germinal Beerschot (2004), Venezia (2005), and Sacilese (2005–2007), where he ended his career. During his time with Fiorentina, he won the Coppa Italia of 2001. Fiorentina paid 15 billion lire to sign Rossitto (€7.75 million) as well as another 5 billion for half of the registration rights of Giuseppe Taglialatela. in the same window, Napoli signed Emiliano Bigica from Fiorentina.

== International career ==
Rossito represented Italy at Under-21 level on nine occasions and was part of the team that won the 1994 UEFA European Under-21 Championship in France under the management of Cesare Maldini, for the first time in Italy's history. All of his appearances at Under-21 level came in 1994.

Rossitto had one appearance for the senior Italy national football team, coming on as a substitute in a 2–0 away win over Hungary on 1 June 1996. He was part of Italy's squad at the 1996 UEFA European Championship in England.

== Managerial career ==
From January 2013 to the end of the season Rossitto served as head coach of Pordenone in the Serie D.

In the 2013–14 season he was the coach of Triestina.

In November 2014, he agreed a comeback at Pordenone, then bottom-placed in the Lega Pro. After failing to save the team from relegation, he left Pordenone by the end of the season. In January 2016, he was then hired as new head coach of Lega Pro club Cremonese, leading the club till the end of the season.

In April 2017, he agreed to accept an offer to serve as Diego Bortoluzzi's assistant at Serie A strugglers Palermo till the end of the season.

On 15 February 2018, he once again returned to Pordenone in the Serie C until the end of the season.

== Honours ==
Fiorentina

- Coppa Italia: 2000–01
