= Anselmo Robbiati =

Italian footballer (born 1970)

Personal information
- Date of birth: 1 January 1970 (age 56)
- Place of birth: Lecco, Italy
- Height: 1.73 m (5 ft 8 in)
- Positions: Forward; attacking midfielder

Team information
- Current team: Figline (assistant)

Senior career*
Years	Team	Apps	(Gls)
1987–1993	Monza	135	(20)
1993–1999	Fiorentina	155	(27)
1999–2000	Napoli	20	(2)
2000–2002	Internazionale	0	(0)
2001	→ Perugia (loan)	12	(3)
2002	→ Fiorentina (loan)	5	(0)
2002–2003	Ancona	12	(0)
2003–2004	Grosseto	8	(2)
2004–2005	Monza	29	(4)
2005–2006	Como	25	(4)
2006–2009	Figline	60	(8)
- * Club domestic league appearances and goals

Anselmo Robbiati (born 1 January 1970) is an Italian former footballer. A former forward or attacking midfielder, he is best remembered for his time with Fiorentina during the 1990s.

== Career ==
Robbiati started his professional career in 1987 with Serie C1 club Monza. In 1993, he signed for Fiorentina, then in Serie B, being instrumental in the viola's successful 1993–94 campaign, which saw them win the Serie B title and obtain promotion to Serie A. He stayed at Fiorentina until 1999; despite often not being featured in the starting lineup, in 1996 he won the Coppa Italia and the Supercoppa Italiana, and he also achieved some success even at the continental level, scoring the decisive goal in the return leg of the UEFA Cup Winners' Cup Round of 16 fixture against Sparta Prague. Fiorentina were ultimately defeated by the eventual champions Barcelona in the semi-finals of the tournament. After a season with Napoli, in 2001 Robbiati signed for Inter, but never managed to play a single match with the nerazzurri, being loaned first to Perugia and then to Fiorentina.

In 2002, Robbiati left the top-flight to join Ancona of Serie B, and then Serie C2 teams Grosseto and Monza. After a season-long stay at Serie D team Como, in October 2006 he signed for Figline, a minor Tuscan team. In his first two seasons with Figline, Robbiati captained the Tuscan club to two consecutive promotions from Eccellenza to Lega Pro Seconda Divisione. He started the 2008–09 with Figline, being joined by former fellow viola Enrico Chiesa. In January 2009, he announced his retirement from active football, accepting to stay at the club in an assistant manager role.

== Style of play ==
A quick, diminutive, and dynamic left-footed forward or attacking midfielder, who could also play as a second striker, Robbiati was known in particular for his creativity, technical ability, and eye for goal, as well as his ability to provide assists for teammates and his attacking movement, which allowed him find gaps in the opposing defence with his runs off the ball. He was also an accurate free kick taker.

== Personal life ==
Robbiati is popularly known as Spadino; the nickname was first used by Giovanni Stroppa during their time together at Monza, and is a reference to Happy Days minor character Raymond "Spike" Fonzarelli ("Spadino" in the Italian version of the sitcom).

His father Luigi Robbiati played in Serie A for Inter in the 1950s.

== Honours ==
Fiorentina

- Coppa Italia: 1995–96
- Supercoppa Italiana: 1996
