= Luca Ceccarelli (footballer, born 20 March 1983) =

Italian footballer

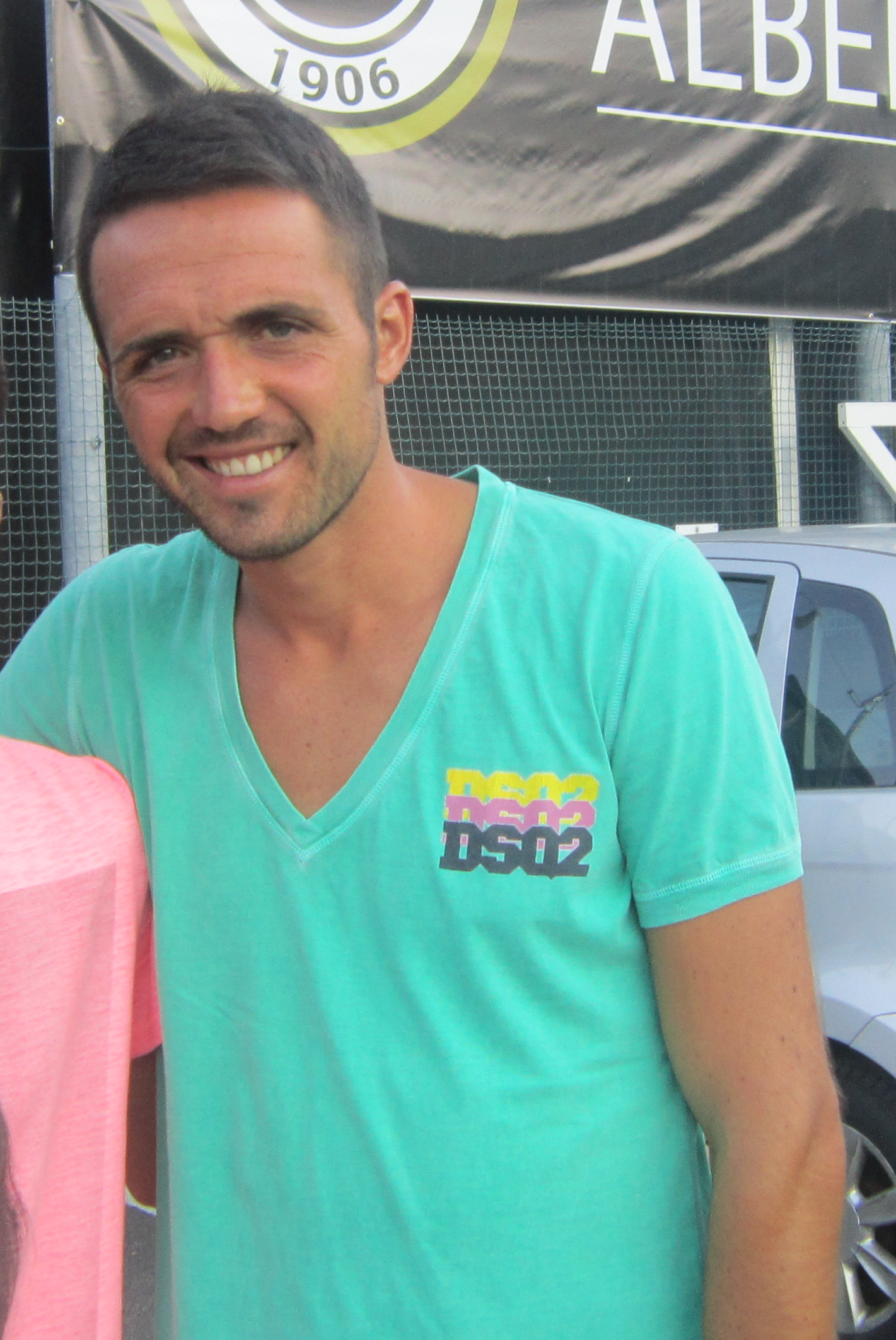

Personal information
- Date of birth: 20 March 1983 (age 43)
- Place of birth: Massa, Italy
- Height: 1.85 m (6 ft 1 in)
- Positions: Right-back; centre-back

Team information
- Current team: Nibbiano

Youth career
- Fiorentina

Senior career*
| Years | Team | Apps | (Gls) |
| 2001–2002 | Fiorentina | 12 | (0) |
| 2002–2008 | Inter Milan | 0 | (0) |
| 2002–2003 | → Venezia (loan) | 0 | (0) |
| 2003 | A.C. Milan | 0 | (0) |
| 2003 | → Fermana (loan) | 12 | (0) |
| 2003–2004 | → Spezia (loan) | 12 | (0) |
| 2004–2005 | → Pro Patria (loan) | 33 | (1) |
| 2005–2006 | → Catanzaro (loan) | 37 | (0) |
| 2006–2007 | → Lucchese (loan) | 28 | (1) |
| 2007–2008 | → Spezia (loan) | 29 | (1) |
| 2008–2013 | Verona | 122 | (8) |
| 2013–2015 | Spezia | 42 | (1) |
| 2014 | → Siena (loan) | 11 | (0) |
| 2015 | → Catania (loan) | 19 | (0) |
| 2015–2018 | Virtus Entella | 105 | (3) |
| 2018–2019 | Pistoiese | 28 | (0) |
| 2019–2020 | Arezzo | 14 | (0) |
| 2020–2021 | Pergolettese | 23 | (1) |
| 2021– | Nibbiano | | |

International career
| 2003–2004 | Italy U20 | 13 | (0) |
- * Club domestic league appearances and goals as of 2 May 2021

Luca Ceccarelli (born 20 March 1983) is an Italian footballer who plays as a defender. He plays for amateur side Nibbiano.

== Football career ==
=== Fiorentina ===
Luca Ceccarelli started his career at Fiorentina. He made his Serie A debut against Internazionale, on 25 November 2001, at the age of 18. That season, he played 12 Serie A matches. He rejected a contract extension in April 2002. and then on 30 June 2002, Ceccarelli was signed by A.C. Milan. His team-mate Emiliano Moretti joined Juventus on the same day, but the funds raised from these transfers were insufficient to prevent AC Fiorentina's bankruptcy that year.

In July 2002, he was signed by Inter Milan in a €2.58 million co-ownership deal with A.C. Milan (around 5 billion lire).

=== Internazionale ===
Ceccarelli proved unable to break into the first team in Internazionale and spent his time there on loan. He was loaned to Venezia of Serie B in August 2002, and in January 2003 to Fermana (Serie C1). In the following seasons, he was loaned to Spezia and Pro Patria (Serie C1). In the 2005–06 season, he joined Catanzaro (Serie B). In 2006–07, he was returned to Serie C1 to play for Lucchese. In the summer of 2007, he rejoined Spezia, this time in Serie B.

=== Verona ===
In June 2008, Milan bought back Ceccarelli from Internazionale for a nominal fee, Inter made a profit of (€2.49 million) as the club no longer needed to pay for the residual half of the registration rights which already amortized. At the same time, Milan wrote down €2.58 million for the residual value of the player's contract, as the revenue (and profit, if any) of the sale was already treated as full registration rights in 2002, and the retained half was treated as a special asset called "co-ownership asset" with a value of €2.58 million.

He was then sold to Serie C1 team Hellas Verona on 1 September.

=== Spezia ===
Ceccarelli returned to Spezia again on 3 July 2013 on a two-year contract. On 31 January 2014 he left for Siena to boost the chance of promotion back to Serie A. On 20 January 2015 he was signed by Catania.

=== Virtus Entella ===
On 28 August 2015 Ceccarelli was signed by Virtus Entella.

=== Pistoiese ===
On 11 October 2018, he joined Pistoiese on a one-year deal with an automatic extension option.

=== Arezzo ===
On 27 September 2019, he signed a 1-year contract with Arezzo.

=== Pergolettese ===
On 1 September 2020, he joined Pergolettese.
