= Daniele Adani =

Italian footballer (born 1974)

Personal information
- Date of birth: 10 July 1974 (age 52)
- Place of birth: Correggio, Italy
- Height: 1.83 m (6 ft 0 in)
- Position: Centre-back

Youth career
- Sammartinese
- Modena

Senior career*
Years	Team	Apps	(Gls)
1991–1994	Modena	48	(1)
1994	Lazio	0	(0)
1994–1999	Brescia	159	(8)
1999–2002	Fiorentina	75	(4)
2002–2004	Inter Milan	30	(2)
2004–2005	Brescia	13	(0)
2005–2006	Ascoli	3	(0)
2006–2008	Empoli	21	(0)
2009–2011	Sammartinese		
Total		379	(13)

International career
2000–2004	Italy	5	(0)

Managerial career
- 2011–2012: Vicenza (assistant)
- * Club domestic league appearances and goals

Daniele "Lele" Adani (Italian pronunciation: [daˈnjɛːle aˈdaːni]; born 10 July 1974) is an Italian football pundit and former professional footballer who played as a central defender.

== Club career ==
Adani started his career in Serie B with Modena, making his first team debuts at the age of 18. In 1994, he transferred to top level's Lazio but, after two gameless months, moved to Brescia in November; subsequently, he followed the club's promotion and relegation between the first and second divisions, appearing in nearly 200 official matches.

In 1999, Adani transferred to Fiorentina for 7 billion lire (€3.615 million), winning the Italian Cup in his second season. In 2002, the club faced bankruptcy, and the player signed for Inter Milan on a free transfer. Though he was not regarded as member of the starting lineup, he would be in the starting lineup more times than expected, managing to score two goals during his two-season stint (in away wins against Empoli and Ancona); he also broke his nose while playing for the Nerazzurri and decided to play with a titanium mask, as Paolo Maldini had done previously. Adani also wore a similar non-metallic mask after he recovered, but dropped it shortly after.

In 2004, Adani returned to Brescia, but left the club in March of the following year, along with Roberto Guana. He joined Ascoli shortly after, appearing in only three games as the Marche side managed to retain its top flight status.

Before retiring from professional football at the age of 34, Adani played two years with Empoli, both in the first division, being regularly used in his first year, as the club qualified to the UEFA Cup, but only in six games in his second, as the club were relegated. In 2009, Adani returned to football with amateurs Sammartinese, in Seconda Categoria (ninth level).

== International career ==
Adani received five appearances for Italy in four years. On 15 November 2000, he debuted in a 1–0 friendly victory against England, coming on as a substitute to Alessandro Nesta. On 27 March 2002, in another exhibition match against the same opponent, Adani made his second appearance in a 2–1 victory at Elland Road, again as a second-half substitute.

== Style of play ==
Regarded as a promising defender in his youth, Adani was known for his composure on the ball and versatility; although he was usually deployed as a man marking centre-back, he was capable of playing anywhere along the back line.

== Coaching career ==
He obtained UEFA B coaching license in 2008. (third category of the license) In 2010, he got the A license, made him eligible to coach Serie C team or as an assistant head coach in higher divisions. On 19 July 2011, it was announced that he would be the assistant head coach of Serie B team Vicenza, under Silvio Baldini.

== TV commentator ==
In 2010, he started working as a color commentator for Sportitalia. In 2012, he joined Sky Sport (Italy). After joining RAI as a commentator, during 2022 World Cup quarter finals, Adani compared Lionel Messi with Jesus, saying that the Argentinian is capable of making wine from water.

== Honours ==
Fiorentina

- Coppa Italia: 2000–01
