= Andrea Tarozzi =

Italian footballer (born 1973)

Personal information
- Date of birth: 17 October 1973 (age 53)
- Place of birth: San Giovanni in Persiceto, Italy
- Height: 1.80 m (5 ft 11 in)
- Position: Defender

Team information
- Current team: Parma (Assistant)

Senior career*
Years	Team	Apps	(Gls)
1992–1997	Bologna	119	(0)
1997–2002	Fiorentina	83	(1)
2002–2003	Ternana	15	(0)
2003–2004	Como	31	(1)
2004–2006	Padova	49	(0)
2006–2008	Sassuolo	11	(1)
Total		308	(3)

Managerial career
- 2011: Sassuolo (assistant)
- 2012–2014: Padova (assistant)
- 2016–: Parma (assistant)
- * Club domestic league appearances and goals

Andrea Tarozzi (born 17 October 1973) is an Italian former footballer, who played as a defender, and currently the assistant manager of Parma.

== Playing career ==
After making his Serie A debut in the 1996–97 season, in July 1997 he joined Fiorentina for 6.5 billion Italian lire, while Daniele Carnasciali moved to opposite direction, for 1.75 billion lire.

Following Fiorentina's bankruptcy, Tarozzi became a free agent.

== Coaching career ==
In 2011, he passed his category 2 coaching exam, making him eligible to coach Lega Pro teams.
