= Giuseppe Taglialatela =

Italian footballer (born 1969)

Personal information
- Date of birth: 2 January 1969 (age 57)
- Place of birth: Ischia, Italy
- Height: 1.84 m (6 ft 0 in)
- Position: Goalkeeper

Senior career*
Years	Team	Apps	(Gls)
1986–1988	Napoli	0	(0)
1988–1989	Palermo	34	(0)
1989–1990	Avellino	38	(0)
1990–1991	Napoli	3	(0)
1991–1992	Palermo	38	(0)
1992–1993	Bari	30	(0)
1993–1999	Napoli	174	(0)
1999–2002	Fiorentina	12	(0)
2002–2003	Siena	1	(0)
2004–2005	Benevento	1	(0)
2005–2006	Avellino	5	(0)
Total		336	(0)
- * Club domestic league appearances and goals

Giuseppe "Pino" Taglialatela (born 2 January 1969) is an Italian former professional football player who played as a goalkeeper. He is the chairman of Serie D club Ischia.

== Playing career ==
Tagliatela joined the Ischia Isolaverde Youth Sector and then moved to his native club Napoli's youth squad. He was promoted to the first team during the 1987–88 season, as the club's third-choice keeper, behind Claudio Garella and Raffaele Di Rusco, without making an appearance in a game.

He began his professional career while on loan with Palermo during the 1988–89 season, when they were in Serie C1. After joining Avellino in Serie B, the following season, he attracted the attention of Serie A clubs.

=== Napoli ===
Taglialatela moved to Napoli in 1990 during their peak. He played in only three games, making his Serie A debut on 6 January 1991, in a 1–0 away defeat to Juventus. After three loan spells at Serie B sides Palermo, Ternana, and Bari, he returned to Napoli in 1993, following Giovanni Galli's transfer to Torino, and played for the club for six years, until 1999.

During that period, he was the club's number one keeper for several years, as well as the club's captain in 1999. He attracted the attention of the league's big clubs, including Inter Milan, but he chose to remain with Napoli, despite the club's financial difficulties. During his third stint with Napoli, the club narrowly missed out on the Coppa Italia during the 1996–97 season, as Napoli lost the final to Vicenza. The subsequent seasons of the club were less successful, as Napoli was relegated to Serie B during the 1997–98 season, conceding numerous goals.

=== Fiorentina ===
In 2001, Taglialatela moved to Fiorentina for 5 billion lire in a co-ownership deal (€2.582 million), where he played as understudy to Francesco Toldo, and later Alexander Manninger. As part of the deal, Fiorentina also signed midfielder Fabio Rossitto for 15 billion lire from Napoli, and sold midfielder Emiliano Bigica to Napoli.

During his first season with the club, Taglialatela made his UEFA Champions League debut in the 2–0 away defeat to Valencia. In June 2000, Fiorentina signed Taglialatela outright; Bigica also joined Napoli outright. He won the Coppa Italia during his second season with Fiorentina. During his third season with the club, Fiorentina were relegated to Serie B.

=== Siena, Benevento, Avellino ===
Taglialatela moved to Siena for one season in 2002.

After a year-long hiatus, he signed with Serie C1 side Benevento, before ending his career and retiring in 2006 after a season with Avellino.

== Style of play ==
Due to his consistent performances, reactions, athleticism, and agility, Taglialatela earned the nicknames "pipistrello" (bat), and "Batman"; he was also known to be a specialist at saving penalty kicks; throughout his career he made 173 appearances in the Italian top–flight between 1991 and 2002, saving 12 penalties from 28 attempts, and he has the highest save percentage from spot kicks in Serie A history (42.9%). He has also stopped the joint–ninth–most penalties in Serie A history, alongside Emiliano Viviano, Luigi Turci, and Massimo Taibi.

== Post-playing career ==
From February to May 2012, Taglialatela worked as goalkeepers' coach for hometown club Ischia. In July 2014, he was named new chairman of hometown club Ischia.

== Honours ==
Napoli

- Serie A: 1986–87
- Coppa Italia: 1986–87
- Supercoppa Italiana: 1990

Fiorentina

- Coppa Italia: 2000–01

Siena

- Serie B: 2002–03
