= 1998–99 AC Fiorentina season =

Fiorentina
1998–99 season
- President: Vittorio Cecchi Gori
- Manager: Giovanni Trapattoni
- Stadium: Stadio Artemio Franchi
- Serie A: 3rd
- Coppa Italia: Runners-up
- UEFA Cup: Second round (disqualified)
- Top goalscorer: League: Gabriel Batistuta (21); All: Gabriel Batistuta (26)
Home colours	Away colours	Third colours

Associazione Calcio Fiorentina enjoyed its best season in the 1990s on the pitch, but was left wondering what might have been. Leading the domestic Serie A championship a long way into the season, Fiorentina's title charge fell to pieces, as it lost unnecessary points while eventual champions Milan and runners-up Lazio continued winning their matches. In the end, Fiorentina salvaged third place in the league, qualifying for the UEFA Champions League in 1999–2000.

Its European adventure in 1998–99 however, ended early, when a handmade bomb was thrown at a linesman in the victory against Swiss side Grasshoppers. The linesman escaped serious injury, but Fiorentina were declared losers of the match, despite its victory on the pitch, and were thus thrown out of the tournament. However, it avoided further sanctions. Fiorentina also lost the Coppa Italia Final to Parma, marking another season without titles.

Several players were impressive, with the trio Gabriel Batistuta, Rui Costa and Francesco Toldo being the players really standing out. The defensive line-up and the many goals conceded were the main reasons Fiorentina would not win the title.

== Players ==
Note: Flags indicate national team as defined under FIFA eligibility rules; some limited exceptions apply. Players may hold more than one non-FIFA nationality.

No.	Pos.	Nation	Player
1	GK	ITA	Francesco Toldo
2	DF	CZE	Tomáš Řepka
3	DF	ITA	Moreno Torricelli
4	DF	ITA	Stefano Bettarini
5	DF	ITA	Pasquale Padalino
6	DF	ITA	Aldo Firicano
7	MF	ESP	Guillermo Amor
8	MF	ITA	Emiliano Bigica
9	FW	ARG	Gabriel Batistuta
10	MF	POR	Rui Costa
11	FW	BRA	Edmundo
12	GK	ITA	Alessandro Zandonà
13	DF	ITA	Lorenzo Collacchioni

No.	Pos.	Nation	Player
14	MF	ITA	Sandro Cois
15	DF	ITA	Roberto Mirri
16	FW	ITA	Carmine Esposito
17	MF	GER	Jörg Heinrich
19	DF	ITA	Giulio Falcone
20	MF	ITA	Domenico Morfeo
22	GK	ITA	Gianmatteo Mareggini
23	FW	ITA	Anselmo Robbiati
24	MF	ITA	Christian Amoroso
25	FW	BEL	Luís Oliveira
27	DF	ITA	Andrea Tarozzi
—	FW	ITA	Francesco Flachi

=== Transfers ===
In
Pos.	Name	from	Type
DF	Moreno Torricelli	Juventus	
MF	Jorg Heinrich	Borussia Dortmund	
FW	Carmine Esposito	Empoli	
DF	Tomas Repka	Sparta Prague	
MF	Guillermo Amor	Barcelona	

Out
Pos.	Name	To	Type
FW	Francesco Flachi	Ancona	
GK	Valerio Fiori	Piacenza	
DF	Michele Serena	Atletico Madrid	
MF	Stefan Schwarz	Valencia	
MF	Andrei Kanchelskis	Glasgow Rangers	
MF	Domenico Morfeo	A.C. Milan	loan

== Competitions ==
=== Serie A ===
==== League table ====
Pos	Team	Pld	W	D	L	GF	GA	GD	Pts	Qualification or relegation
1	Milan (C)	34	20	10	4	59	34	+25	70	Qualification to Champions League group stage
2	Lazio	34	20	9	5	65	31	+34	69	Qualification to Champions League group stage
3	Fiorentina	34	16	8	10	55	41	+14	56	Qualification to Champions League third qualifying round
4	Parma	34	15	10	9	55	36	+19	55	Qualification to Champions League third qualifying round
5	Roma	34	15	9	10	69	49	+20	54 (Note: ROM 7pts. JUV 5pts. UDI 4pts.)	Qualification to UEFA Cup first round

Source: Serie A, RSSSF.com, Soccerway
Rules for classification: 1) Points; 2) Head-to-head points; 3) Head-to-head goal difference; 4) Goal difference; 5) Goals scored; 6) Draw. (Note: Head-to-head record is used only after all the matches between the teams in question have been played).
(C) Champions

==== Results summary ====
Overall								Home						Away					
Pld	W	D	L	GF	GA	GD	Pts	W	D	L	GF	GA	GD	W	D	L	GF	GA	GD
34	16	8	10	55	41	+14	56	13	4	0	36	10	+26	3	4	10	19	31	−12

Last updated: 25 July 2015.
Source: Competitive matches

==== Results by round ====
Round	1	2	3	4	5	6	7	8	9	10	11	12	13	14	15	16	17	18	19	20	21	22	23	24	25	26	27	28	29	30	31	32	33	34
Ground	H	A	A	H	A	H	A	H	A	H	A	H	H	A	H	A	H	A	H	H	A	H	A	H	A	H	A	H	A	A	H	A	H	A
Result	W	W	W	W	L	W	L	W	L	W	D	W	W	D	W	L	W	W	W	D	L	D	D	W	L	W	L	D	L	L	W	L	D	D
Position	1	1	1	1	1	1	2	1	1	1	1	1	1	1	1	1	1	1	1	1	1	2	2	2	2	2	2	3	3	3	3	4	3	3

Source: Competitive matches
A = Away; H = Home; W = Win; D = Draw; L = Loss; = Leader, UEFA Champions League Group stage; = UEFA Champions League Group stage; = UEFA Champions League Qualifying round; = 1999-2000 UEFA Cup; = 1999 UEFA Intertoto Cup

==== Matches ====
12 September 1998 1	Fiorentina	2–0	Empoli	Florence
	Rui Costa 5'; Batistuta 60'	Report		Stadium: Stadio Artemio Franchi; Attendance: 34,343; Referee: Alfredo Trentalange

20 September 1998 2	Vicenza	1–2	Fiorentina	Vicenza
	Padalino 67' (o.g.)	Report	Batistuta 1'; Oliveira 71'	Stadium: Stadio Romeo Menti; Attendance: 16,000; Referee: Graziano Cesari

26 September 1998 3	Milan	1–3	Fiorentina	Milan
	Bierhoff 70' (pen.)	Report	Batistuta 6', 46', 52'	Stadium: San Siro; Attendance: 16,000; Referee: Stefano Braschi

4 October 1998 4	Fiorentina	1–0	Udinese	Florence
	Edmundo 90+2'	Report		Stadium: Stadio Artemio Franchi; Attendance: 34,000; Referee: Stefano Braschi

17 October 1998 5	Roma	2–1	Fiorentina	Rome
	Alenichev 89'; Totti 90+4'	Report	Batistuta 32'	Stadium: Stadio Olimpico; Attendance: 62,000; Referee: Livio Bazzoli

25 October 1998 6	Fiorentina	4–0	Salernitana	Florence
	Edmundo 50', 89'; Batistuta 68', 90+2'	Report		Stadium: Stadio Artemio Franchi; Attendance: 40,000; Referee: Alfredo Trentalange

31 October 1998 7	Parma	2–0	Fiorentina	Parma
	Crespo 36', 52'	Report		Stadium: Stadio Ennio Tardini; Attendance: 30,000; Referee: Piero Ceccarini

8 November 1998 8	Fiorentina	4–1	Venezia	Florence
	Padalino 23'; Batistuta 40', 65'; Rui Costa 64' (pen.)	Report	Schwoch 42' (pen.)	Stadium: Stadio Artemio Franchi; Referee: Massimo De Santis

15 November 1998 9	Piacenza	4–2	Fiorentina	Piacenza
	Rastelli 12'; S. Inzaghi 29' (pen.); Cristallini 59'; Piovani 90+4'	Report	Rui Costa 23' (pen.); Edmundo 40' (pen.)	Stadium: Stadio Leonardo Garilli; Attendance: 16,000; Referee: Salvatore Racalbuto

22 November 1998 10	Fiorentina	3–1	Internazionale	Florence
	Padalino 5'; Batistuta 16'; Heinrich 75'	Report	Djorkaeff 3' (pen.)	Stadium: Stadio Artemio Franchi; Attendance: 41,000; Referee: Pasquale Rodomonti

29 November 1998 11	Bari	0–0	Fiorentina	Bari
		Report		Stadium: Stadio San Nicola; Attendance: 26,000; Referee: Piero Ceccarini

5 December 1998 12	Fiorentina	1–0	Bologna	Florence
	Batistuta 56'	Report		Stadium: Stadio Artemio Franchi; Attendance: 32,000; Referee: Stefano Braschi

13 December 1998 13	Fiorentina	1–0	Juventus	Florence
	Batistuta 58'	Report		Stadium: Stadio Artemio Franchi; Attendance: 40,000; Referee: Stefano Farina

20 December 1998 14	Perugia	2–2	Fiorentina	Perugia
	Rapaić 1'; Nakata 90+5' (pen.)	Report	Robbiati 10'; Batistuta 74'	Stadium: Stadio Renato Curi; Attendance: 20,000; Referee: Graziano Cesari

6 January 1999 15	Fiorentina	1–0	Sampdoria	Florence
	Rui Costa 28'	Report		Stadium: Stadio Artemio Franchi; Attendance: 36,223; Referee: Pierluigi Collina

10 January 1999 16	Lazio	2–0	Fiorentina	Rome
	Vieri 66'; Mihajlović 90'	Report		Stadium: Stadio Olimpico; Attendance: 69,000; Referee: Livio Bazzoli

17 January 1999 17	Fiorentina	4–2	Cagliari	Florence
	Batistuta 7', 79', 89'; Edmundo 76'	Report	O'Neill 32'; De Patre 59'	Stadium: Stadio Artemio Franchi; Attendance: 33,073; Referee: Pasquale Rodomonti

24 January 1999 18	Empoli	0–3	Fiorentina	Empoli
		Report	Heinrich 77'; Rui Costa 81'; Edmundo 83'	Stadium: Stadio Carlo Castellani; Attendance: 12,000; Referee: Stefano Braschi

31 January 1999 19	Fiorentina	3–0	Vicenza	Florence
	Falcone 36'; Torricelli 39'; Batistuta 83'	Report		Stadium: Stadio Artemio Franchi; Attendance: 32,000; Referee: Gennaro Borriello

7 February 1999 20	Fiorentina	0–0	Milan	Florence
	Repka (yellow card); Heinrich (yellow card); Batistuta 89'	Report	(yellow card) Costacurta; (yellow card) Ambrosini	Stadium: Stadio Artemio Franchi; Attendance: 42,000; Referee: Alfredo Trentalange

14 February 1999 21	Udinese	1–0	Fiorentina	Udine
	Sosa 80'	Report		Stadium: Stadio Friuli; Attendance: 25,000; Referee: Piero Ceccarini

21 February 1999 22	Fiorentina	0–0	Roma	Florence
		Report		Stadium: Stadio Artemio Franchi; Attendance: 43,170; Referee: Gennaro Borriello

28 February 1999 23	Salernitana	1–1	Fiorentina	Salerno
	Di Vaio 75'	Report	Torricelli 86'	Stadium: Stadio Arechi; Attendance: 33,000; Referee: Fiorenzo Treossi

7 March 1999 24	Fiorentina	2–1	Parma	Florence
	Oliveira 42'; Rui Costa 55' (pen.)	Report	Stanić 64'	Stadium: Stadio Artemio Franchi; Attendance: 34,000; Referee: Pasquale Rodomonti

14 March 1999 25	Venezia	4–1	Fiorentina	Venice
	Recoba 18', 45+2', 90+1'; Miceli 42'	Report	Esposito 88' (pen.)	Stadium: Stadio Pier Luigi Penzo; Attendance: 12,630; Referee: Domenico Messina

21 March 1999 26	Fiorentina	2–1	Piacenza	Florence
	Batistuta 6'; Esposito 90+1'	Report	S. Inzaghi 71' (pen.)	Stadium: Stadio Artemio Franchi; Attendance: 33,400; Referee: Pierluigi Collina

3 April 1999 27	Internazionale	2–0	Fiorentina	Milan
	Ronaldo 45' (pen.), 83' (pen.)	Report		Stadium: San Siro; Referee: Alfredo Trentalange

11 April 1999 28	Fiorentina	2–2	Bari	Florence
	Rui Costa 41'; Padalino 72'	Report	Osmanovski 66'; Guerrero 89'	Stadium: Stadio Artemio Franchi; Referee: Pasquale Rodomonti

17 April 1999 29	Bologna	3–0	Fiorentina	Bologna
	Simutenkov 28'; Bettarini 62'; Kolyvanov 69'	Report		Stadium: Stadio Renato Dall'Ara; Attendance: 28,000; Referee: Graziano Cesari

25 April 1999 30	Juventus	2–1	Fiorentina	Turin
	Inzaghi 24'; Conte 87'	Report	Tacchinardi 85' (o.g.)	Stadium: Stadio delle Alpi; Attendance: 46,900; Referee: Fiorenzo Treossi

2 May 1999 31	Fiorentina	5–1	Perugia	Florence
	Batistuta 40'; Rui Costa 42', 67'; Edmundo 76' (pen.), 90+2'	Report	Firicano 78' (o.g.)	Stadium: Stadio Artemio Franchi; Attendance: 35,000; Referee: Pasquale Rodomonti

9 May 1999 32	Sampdoria	3–2	Fiorentina	Genoa
	Montella 29', 51'; Palmieri 78'	Report	Rui Costa 20' (pen.); Heinrich 41'	Stadium: Stadio Luigi Ferraris; Referee: Roberto Bettin

15 May 1999 33	Fiorentina	1–1	Lazio	Florence
	Batistuta 14'	Report	Vieri 27'	Stadium: Stadio Artemio Franchi; Attendance: 40,000; Referee: Fiorenzo Treossi

23 May 1999 34	Cagliari	1–1	Fiorentina	Cagliari
	Muzzi 90+3'	Report	Zebina 40' (o.g.)	Stadium: Stadio Sant'Elia; Referee: Emilio Pellegrino

=== Coppa Italia ===
==== Round of 32 ====
9 September 1998 1st Leg	Padova	0–1	Fiorentina	Padua
			86' Esposito	Stadium: Stadio Euganeo; Referee: Cosimo Bolognino

23 September 1998 2nd Leg	Fiorentina	2–0 (3–0 agg.)	Padova	Florence
	Batistuta 68'; Rui Costa 81'			Stadium: Stadio Artemio Franchi; Referee: Pirrone

==== Eightfinals ====
28 October 1998 1st Leg	Fiorentina	1–0	Lecce	Florence
	Batistuta 83'			Stadium: Artemio Franchi; Referee: Livio Bazzoli

10 November 1998 2nd Leg	Lecce	0–4 (0–5 agg.)	Fiorentina	Lecce
			59' (rig) Rui Costa; 60' Torricelli; 80' Edmundo; 87' Batistuta	Stadium: Stadio Via del mare Referee: Cosimo Bolognino

==== Quarterfinals ====
2 December 1998 1st Leg	Atalanta	3–2	Fiorentina	Bergamo
	Torricelli 29' (aut); Rossini 65'; Carrera 83'		8' (aut) Rustico; 34' Edmundo	Stadium: Stadio Atleti Azzurri d'Italia; Referee: Alfredo Trentalange

28 January 1999 2nd Leg	Fiorentina	1–0 (3a–3 agg.)	Atalanta	Florence
	Robbiati 9'			Stadium: Artemio Franchi; Referee: Roberto Bettin

==== Semifinals ====
18 February 1999 1st Leg	Bologna	0–2	Fiorentina	Bologna
			32' Esposito; 65' Rui Costa	Stadium: Stadio Renato Dall'Ara; Referee: Emilio Pellegrino

10 March 1999 2nd Leg	Fiorentina	2–2 (4–2 agg.)	Bologna	Florence
	Cois 98'; Rui Costa 118'		18', 64' Binotto	Stadium: Stadio Artemio Franchi; Referee: Gennaro Borriello

==== Final ====
14 April 1999 1st Leg	Parma	1–1	Fiorentina	Parma
20:00	Crespo 16'		81' Batistuta	Stadium: Il Tardini; Attendance: 21,038; Referee: Domenico Messina

5 May 1999 2nd Leg	Fiorentina	2–2 (3–3a agg.)	Parma	Florence
20:00	Řepka 48'; Cois 62'		42' Crespo; 71' Vanoli	Stadium: Stadio Artemio Franchi; Attendance: 39,070; Referee: Stefano Braschi

=== UEFA Cup ===
==== First round ====
15 September 1998 1st Leg	Fiorentina (Italy)	2–1	(Croatia) Hajduk Split	Bari, Italy
20:00 CEST (UTC+02:00)	Esposito (yellow card) 49'; Edmundo 50', 81'; Heinrich (yellow card) 56'; Torricelli (red card) 73'	Report	Biliškov (yellow card) 30'; Brajković (yellow card) 32'; Skoko (yellow card) 38'; Vučko 44'	Stadium: Stadio San Nicola; Attendance: 6,000; Referee: Graham Barber (England)

29 September 1998 2nd Leg	Hajduk Split (Croatia)	0–0 (1–2 agg.)	(Italy) Fiorentina	Split, Croatia
18:00 CEST (UTC+02:00)	Biliškov (yellow card) 50'; Baturina (yellow card) 52'	Report	Cois (yellow card) 21'; Padalino (yellow card) 54'; Toldo (yellow card) 73'	Stadium: Stadion Poljud; Attendance: 35,000; Referee: Claude Colombo (France)

==== Second round ====
20 October 1998 1st Leg	Grasshopper (Switzerland)	0–2	(Italy) Fiorentina	Zürich, Switzerland
19:00 CEST (UTC+02:00)	Esposito (yellow card) 12'; Comisetti (yellow card) 63'; Christ (yellow card) 67'	Report	Amoroso (yellow card) 1'; Batistuta 20'; Robbiati 48', (yellow card) 73'; Torricelli (yellow card) 64'; Padalino (yellow card) 87'	Stadium: Hardturm; Referee: Graham Poll (England)

3 November 1998 2nd Leg	Fiorentina (Italy)	0–3 (Awarded) (2–3 agg.)	(Switzerland) Grasshopper	Salerno, Italy
20:45 CET (UTC+01:00)	Oliveira 12', 38'; Falcone (yellow card) 33'	Report	Cabanas (yellow card) 28'; Gren 30'	Stadium: Stadio Arechi; Referee: Michel Piraux (Belgium)
Note: The match was abandoned at halftime with the score 2–1 after an official was injured by a firework. Grasshopper were awarded a 3–0 win and advanced 3–2 on aggregate.

=== Other matches and friendlies ===
20 August 1998 Cirio Cup	Lazio	1–0	Fiorentina	Rome
	Salas 45' (pen.)	Report		Stadium: Stadio Olimpico; Attendance: 35,000

3 September 1998 Memorial Mario Cecchi Gori, #1	Fiorentina	2–0	Lazio	Florence
	Batistuta 14', 20'	Report		Stadium: Stadio Artemio Franchi
Note: The match lasted one 45-minute half

3 September 1998 Memorial Mario Cecchi Gori, #2	Fiorentina	0–1	(France) Monaco	Florence
		Report	Trezeguet 39'	Stadium: Stadio Artemio Franchi
Note: The match lasted one 45-minute half

== Statistics ==
=== Players statistics ===
No.	Pos	Nat	Player	Total		Serie A		Coppa		UEFA	
No.	Pos	Nat	Player	Apps	Goals	Apps	Goals	Apps	Goals	Apps	Goals
1	GK	(Italy) ITA	Toldo	47	-51	33	-39	10	-8	4	-4
3	DF	(Italy) ITA	Torricelli	43	3	31	2	9	1	3	0
2	DF	(Czech Republic) CZE	Repka	44	2	31	0	9	2	4	0
5	DF	(Italy) ITA	Padalino	35	3	28	3	5	0	2	0
17	DF	(Germany) GER	Heinrich	46	3	33	3	9	0	4	0
24	MF	(Italy) ITA	Amoroso	38	0	28	0	6	0	4	0
14	MF	(Italy) ITA	Cois	32	1	22+1	0	7	1	2	0
10	MF	(Portugal) POR	Rui Costa	40	14	31	10	8	4	1	0
9	FW	(Argentina) ARG	Batistuta	41	26	28	21	9	4	4	1
11	FW	(Brazil) BRA	Edmundo	38	12	28	8	6	2	4	2
25	FW	(Belgium) BEL	Oliveira	39	2	27+3	2	8	0	1	0
22	GK	(Italy) ITA	Mareggini	1	-2	1	-2	-0	0	-0	0
19	DF	(Italy) ITA	Falcone	38	1	21+5	1	9	0	3	0
27	DF	(Italy) ITA	Tarozzi	22	0	8+7	0	4	0	3	0
6	DF	(Italy) ITA	Firicano	16	0	8+3	0	4	0	1	0
	FW	(Italy) ITA	Ficini	14	0	5+8	0	1	0	0	0
16	FW	(Italy) ITA	Esposito	23	4	4+11	2	6	2	2	0
23	FW	(Italy) ITA	Robbiati	29	3	3+19	1	6	1	1	1
7	MF	(Spain) ESP	Amor	26	0	3+13	0	7	0	3	0
8	MF	(Italy) ITA	Bigica	11	0	1+6	0	2	0	2	0
4	DF	(Italy) ITA	Bettarini	7	0	0+2	0	4	0	1	0
20	MF	(Italy) ITA	Morfeo	14	0	0+2	0	2	0	10	
15	DF	(Italy) ITA	Mirri	3	0	0+1	0	0	0	2	0
12	GK	(Italy) ITA	Zandona	0	0	0	0				
13	DF	(Italy) ITA	Collacchioni	0	0	0	0				
	FW	(Greece) GRE	Vakouftsis	0	0	0	0				
	MF	(Italy) ITA	Stefani	0	0	0	0				

- Source: http://calcio-seriea.net/rose/1998/1146/

=== Goalscorers ===
- (Argentina) Gabriel Batistuta 27
- (Portugal) Rui Costa 9 (3)
- (Brazil) Edmundo 8
