= 1999 Coppa Italia final =

51st Coppa Italia final
- Event: 1998–99 Coppa Italia
Parma	Fiorentina
3	3
- Parma won on the away goals rule

First leg
Parma	Fiorentina
1	1
- Date: 14 April 1999
- Venue: Stadio Ennio Tardini, Parma
- Referee: Domenico Messina
- Attendance: 21,038

Second leg
Fiorentina	Parma
2	2
- Date: 5 May 1999
- Venue: Stadio Artemio Franchi, Florence
- Referee: Stefano Braschi
- Attendance: 39,070

The 1999 Coppa Italia final decided the winner of the 1998–99 Coppa Italia, the major domestic tournament in Italian football.

Played over two legs, it ended 3–3 on aggregate, with Parma beating Fiorentina on the away goals rule. It was Parma's third final and second victory.

== First leg ==
14 April 1999
20:00

Parma	1–1	Fiorentina
Crespo 16'		Batistuta 81'

Stadio Ennio Tardini, Parma
Attendance: 21,038
Referee: Domenico Messina

Parma	Fiorentina

GK	1	(Italy) Gianluigi Buffon
RB	21	(France) Lilian Thuram
CB	6	(Argentina) Roberto Sensini (c)	Booked
CB	17	(Italy) Fabio Cannavaro
LB	24	(Italy) Paolo Vanoli
RM	7	(Italy) Diego Fuser
CM	8	(Italy) Dino Baggio
CM	11	(Argentina) Juan Sebastián Verón
LM	13	(Croatia) Mario Stanić
CF	9	(Argentina) Hernán Crespo	Booked	(substituted off) 80'
CF	20	(Italy) Enrico Chiesa		(substituted off) 69'
Substitutes:
GK	24	(Italy) Alessandro Nista
DF	3	(Italy) Antonio Benarrivo
DF	5	(Italy) Luigi Apolloni
DF	14	(Italy) Roberto Mussi		(substituted in) 69'
MF	19	(Italy) Pierluigi Orlandini
MF	23	(Italy) Stefano Fiore
FW	18	(Argentina) Abel Balbo		(substituted in) 80'
Manager:
(Italy) Alberto Malesani

GK	1	(Italy) Francesco Toldo
RB	3	(Italy) Moreno Torricelli
CB	2	(Czech Republic) Tomás Repka
CB	19	(Italy) Giulio Falcone
CB	5	(Italy) Pasquale Padalino	Booked
LB	17	(Germany) Jörg Heinrich
AM	10	(Portugal) Rui Costa
CM	14	(Italy) Sandro Cois
CM	24	(Italy) Christian Amoroso
CF	11	(Brazil) Edmundo
CF	9	(Argentina) Gabriel Batistuta (c)
Substitutes:
GK	22	(Italy) Gianmatteo Mareggini
DF	6	(Italy) Aldo Firicano
DF	27	(Italy) Andrea Tarozzi
MF	7	(Spain) Guillermo Amor
MF	8	(Italy) Emiliano Bigica
FW	16	(Italy) Carmine Esposito
FW	25	(Belgium) Luís Oliveira
Manager:
(Italy) Giovanni Trapattoni

MATCH OFFICIALS

- Assistant referees:
- Fourth official:

MATCH RULES

- 90 minutes
- Seven named substitutes
- Maximum of three substitutions

== Second leg ==
5 May 1999
20:00

Fiorentina	2–2	Parma
Řepka 48'; Cois 62'		Crespo 42'; Vanoli 71'

Stadio Artemio Franchi, Florence
Attendance: 39,070
Referee: Stefano Braschi

Fiorentina	Parma

GK	1	(Italy) Francesco Toldo	Booked
RB	3	(Italy) Moreno Torricelli
CB	2	(Czech Republic) Tomás Repka
CB	19	(Italy) Giulio Falcone
CB	5	(Italy) Pasquale Padalino
LB	17	(Germany) Jörg Heinrich	Booked
AM	10	(Portugal) Rui Costa
CM	14	(Italy) Sandro Cois		(substituted off) 80'
CM	24	(Italy) Christian Amoroso
CF	11	(Brazil) Edmundo	Booked
CF	9	(Argentina) Gabriel Batistuta (c)
Substitutes:
FW	25	(Belgium) Luís Oliveira		(substituted in) 80'
Manager:
(Italy) Giovanni Trapattoni

GK	1	(Italy) Gianluigi Buffon
RB	21	(France) Lilian Thuram
CB	6	(Argentina) Roberto Sensini (c)	Booked
CB	17	(Italy) Fabio Cannavaro
LB	24	(Italy) Paolo Vanoli
RM	7	(Italy) Diego Fuser
CM	15	(France) Alain Boghossian
CM	11	(Argentina) Juan Sebastián Verón	Booked	(substituted off) 79'
LM	13	(Croatia) Mario Stanić	Booked	(substituted off) 68'
CF	9	(Argentina) Hernán Crespo		(substituted off) 85'
CF	20	(Italy) Enrico Chiesa
Substitutes:
GK	24	(Italy) Alessandro Nista
DF	14	(Italy) Roberto Mussi		(substituted in) 79'
DF	5	(Italy) Luigi Apolloni
MF	23	(Italy) Stefano Fiore		(substituted in) 68'
FW	18	(Argentina) Abel Balbo		(substituted in) 85'
Manager:
(Italy) Alberto Malesani

MATCH OFFICIALS

- Assistant referees:
- Fourth official:

MATCH RULES

- 90 minutes
- Seven named substitutes
- Maximum of three substitutions
- If the scores are level at full-time, the winner is decided on the away goals rule.
- If the scores are still level, 30 minutes of extra time is played.
- If the scores remain level after extra time, there is a penalty shoot-out.

== See also ==
- 1998–99 AC Fiorentina season
- 1998–99 Parma AC season
- 2001 Coppa Italia final - played between same teams
