= 1996–97 Parma AC season =

Parma
1996–97 season
- Owner: Parmalat
- President: Stefano Tanzi
- Manager: Carlo Ancelotti
- Stadium: Il Tardini
- Serie A: Runners-up
- Coppa Italia: 2nd round
- UEFA Cup: First round
- Top goalscorer: League: Chiesa (14); All: Chiesa (16)
Home colours	Away colours	Third colours

The 1996–97 season was Parma Associazione Calcio's seventh consecutive season in Serie A. The team competed in Serie A, the Coppa Italia, and the UEFA Cup, where it suffered a shock first round exit to Portuguese club Vitória de Guimarães.

== Season review ==
Parma came the closest it had ever been to winning the Italian championship, but came up short by finishing only two points behind Juventus. The season started with Luca Bucci still as Parma's starting keeper. Young goalkeeper Gianluigi Buffon, along with new recruits Lilian Thuram, Enrico Chiesa and Hernán Crespo, proved to be the driving force in Parma's title bid, which nearly reached ultimate success. However, a dubious penalty for Juventus in a 1–1 draw against the Turin club in May sealed Juventus' title.

== Players ==
Squad at end of season

Note: Flags indicate national team as defined under FIFA eligibility rules; some limited exceptions apply. Players may hold more than one non-FIFA nationality.

No.	Pos.	Nation	Player
2	DF	(Italy) ITA	Luigi Apolloni
3	DF	(Italy) ITA	Antonio Benarrivo
6	MF	(France) FRA	Daniel Bravo
7	DF	(Argentina) ARG	Roberto Sensini
8	MF	(Italy) ITA	Dino Baggio
9	MF	(Italy) ITA	Massimo Crippa
11	FW	(Argentina) ARG	Hernán Crespo
12	GK	(Italy) ITA	Gianluigi Buffon
14	DF	(Italy) ITA	Roberto Mussi
16	FW	(Italy) ITA	Gianluca Triuzzi
17	DF	(Italy) ITA	Fabio Cannavaro
18	MF	(Italy) ITA	Pietro Strada

No.	Pos.	Nation	Player
19	FW	(Italy) ITA	Alessandro Melli
20	FW	(Italy) ITA	Enrico Chiesa
21	DF	(France) FRA	Lilian Thuram
22	DF	(Brazil) BRA	Zé Maria
23	GK	(Italy) ITA	Alessandro Nista
24	DF	(Italy) ITA	Luca Pinton
25	MF	(Italy) ITA	Simone Barone
26	MF	(Croatia) CRO	Mario Stanić
27	DF	(Italy) ITA	Sebastiano Sapienza
29	FW	(Italy) ITA	Fabrizio Miccoli
31	MF	(France) FRA	Reynald Pedros
33	FW	(Sweden) SWE	Tomas Brolin

=== Transfers ===
In
Pos.	Name	from	Type
FW	Enrico Chiesa	Sampdoria	€13.80 million
DF	Lilian Thuram	AS Monaco	
FW	Hernan Crespo	CA River Plate	€4.13 million
MF	Pietro Strada	AC Reggiana	
MF	Amaral	Palmeiras	
DF	Zé Maria	Flamengo	
MF	Daniel Bravo	Paris Saint Germain	

Out
Pos.	Name	To	Type
FW	Hristo Stoichkov	FC Barcelona	
FW	Filippo Inzaghi	Atalanta BC	
DF	Fernando Couto	FC Barcelona	
MF	Alberto Di Chiara	Perugia Calcio	
MF	Gabriele Pin	Piacenza Calcio	
FW	Faustino Asprilla	Newcastle United	
DF	Lorenzo Minotti	Cagliari Calcio	
DF	Marcello Castellini	Perugia Calcio	

==== Winter ====
In
Pos.	Name	from	Type
MF	Mario Stanic	Club Brugge	
MF	Tomas Brolin	Leeds United	loan
MF	Reynald Pedros	Olympique Marseille	

Out
Pos.	Name	To	Type
FW	Gianfranco Zola	Chelsea	
GK	Luca Bucci	Perugia	
MF	Amaral	Benfica	loan
MF	Massimo Brambilla	Bologna	

== Competitions ==
=== Serie A ===
==== League table ====
Pos	Team	Pld	W	D	L	GF	GA	GD	Pts	Qualification or relegation
1	Juventus (C)	34	17	14	3	51	24	+27	65	Qualified to Champions League group stage
2	Parma	34	18	9	7	41	26	+15	63	Qualified to Champions League qualifying round
3	Internazionale	34	15	14	5	51	35	+16	59	Qualification to UEFA Cup
4	Lazio	34	15	10	9	54	37	+17	55	Qualification to UEFA Cup
5	Udinese	34	15	9	10	53	41	+12	54	Qualification to UEFA Cup

Source: Serie A, RSSSF.com, Soccerway
Rules for classification: 1) Points; 2) Head-to-head points; 3) Head-to-head goal difference; 4) Goal difference; 5) Goals scored; 6) Draw. (Note: Head-to-head record is used only after all the matches between the teams in question have been played).
(C) Champions

==== Results by round ====
Round	1	2	3	4	5	6	7	8	9	10	11	12	13	14	15	16	17	18	19	20	21	22	23	24	25	26	27	28	29	30	31	32	33	34
Ground	H	A	H	A	A	H	A	H	A	H	A	H	A	A	H	A	H	A	H	A	H	H	A	H	A	H	A	H	A	H	H	A	H	A
Result	W	D	W	L	W	L	L	D	D	D	L	D	D	W	W	W	W	L	W	D	W	W	W	W	L	W	W	L	W	W	D	D	W	W
Position	2	4	1	4	3	6	11	12	10	11	14	14	14	11	9	6	4	6	6	6	3	2	2	2	2	2	2	2	2	2	2	2	2	2

Updated to match(es) played on 1 June 1997. Source: Competitive matches
A = Away; H = Home; W = Win; D = Draw; L = Loss; = Leader, 1997–98 UEFA Champions League Group stage; = 1997–98 UEFA Champions League second qualifying round; = 1997–98 UEFA Cup first round

==== Matches ====
7 September 1996 1	Parma	3–0	Napoli	Parma
	D. Baggio 14'; Chiesa 22'; Zola 87'	Report		Stadium: Stadio Ennio Tardini; Referee: Domenico Messina

15 September 1996 2	Piacenza	0–0	Parma	Piacenza
		Report		Stadium: Stadio Galleana; Referee: Pierluigi Pairetto

21 September 1996 3	Parma	3–2	Reggiana	Parma
	Grün 10' (o.g.); Chiesa 37' (pen.); Zola 60'	Report	Sabău 25'; Tovalieri 58'	Stadium: Stadio Ennio Tardini; Referee: Alfredo Trentalange

29 September 1996 4	Lazio	2–1	Parma	Rome
	Protti 25'; Casiraghi 62'	Report	D. Baggio 66'	Stadium: Stadio Olimpico; Referee: Robert Anthony Boggi

13 October 1996 5	Cagliari	0–1	Parma	Cagliari
		Report	Chiesa 5'	Stadium: Stadio Sant'Elia; Referee: Pierluigi Collina

20 October 1996 6	Parma	1–2	Perugia	Parma
	Chiesa 90'	Report	Giunti 22'; Gautieri 25'	Stadium: Stadio Ennio Tardini; Referee: Gennaro Borriello

27 October 1996 7	Internazionale	3–1	Parma	Milan
	Zamorano 6', 54'; Zanetti 24'	Report	Crespo 1'	Stadium: San Siro; Referee: Fiorenzo Treossi

3 November 1996 8	Parma	0–0	Fiorentina	Parma
		Report		Stadium: Stadio Ennio Tardini; Referee: Stefano Farina

17 November 1996 9	Sampdoria	1–1	Parma	Genoa
	Carparelli 32'	Report	Chiesa 82'	Stadium: Stadio Luigi Ferraris; Referee: Piero Ceccarini

24 November 1996 10	Parma	0–0	Roma	Parma
		Report		Stadium: Stadio Ennio Tardini; Referee: Emilio Pellegrino

1 December 1996 11	Udinese	3–1	Parma	Udine
	Apolloni 65' (o.g.); Bierhoff 81', 90'	Report	Zé Maria 40'	Stadium: Stadio Friuli; Referee: Salvatore Racalbuto

8 December 1996 12	Parma	0–0	Atalanta	Parma
		Report		Stadium: Stadio Ennio Tardini; Referee: Massimo De Santis

15 December 1996 13	Vicenza	1–1	Parma	Vicenza
	Maini 50'	Report	Benarrivo 72'	Stadium: Stadio Romeo Menti; Referee: Fiorenzo Treossi

22 December 1996 14	Milan	0–1	Parma	Milan
		Report	Stanić 45'	Stadium: San Siro; Referee: Livio Bazzoli

5 January 1997 15	Parma	1–0	Juventus	Parma
	Chiesa 2'	Report		Stadium: Stadio Ennio Tardini; Referee: Piero Ceccarini

12 January 1997 16	Bologna	0–1	Parma	Bologna
		Report	Strada 45'	Stadium: Stadio Renato Dall'Ara; Referee: Domenico Messina

19 January 1997 17	Parma	1–0	Hellas Verona	Parma
	Stanić 68'	Report		Stadium: Stadio Ennio Tardini; Referee: Loris Stafoggia

26 January 1997 18	Napoli	2–1	Parma	Naples
	Pecchia 22'; André Cruz 56'	Report	Chiesa 31'	Stadium: Stadio San Paolo; Referee: Stefano Braschi

2 February 1997 19	Parma	1–0	Piacenza	Parma
	Chiesa 58'	Report		Stadium: Stadio Ennio Tardini; Referee: Graziano Cesari

16 February 1997 20	Reggiana	0–0	Parma	Reggio Emilia
		Report		Stadium: Stadio Giglio; Referee: Pasquale Rodomonti

23 February 1997 21	Parma	2–0	Lazio	Parma
	Stanić 3'; Chiesa 26'	Report		Stadium: Stadio Ennio Tardini; Referee: Pierluigi Collina

2 March 1997 22	Parma	3–2	Cagliari	Parma
	Thuram 16'; Crespo 45', 50'	Report	Tovalieri 73', 89'	Stadium: Stadio Ennio Tardini; Referee: Roberto Bettin

9 March 1997 23	Perugia	1–2	Parma	Perugia
	Goretti 11'	Report	Crespo 12'; Crippa 17'	Stadium: Stadio Renato Curi; Referee: Pierluigi Pairetto

15 March 1997 24	Parma	1–0	Internazionale	Parma
	Chiesa 22'	Report		Stadium: Stadio Ennio Tardini; Referee: Livio Bazzoli

23 March 1997 25	Fiorentina	1–0	Parma	Florence
	Thuram 34' (o.g.)	Report		Stadium: Stadio Artemio Franchi; Referee: Domenico Messina

6 April 1997 26	Parma	3–0	Sampdoria	Parma
	Crespo 34', 84'; Sensini 68'	Report		Stadium: Stadio Ennio Tardini; Referee: Piero Ceccarini

13 April 1997 27	Roma	0–1	Parma	Rome
		Report	Crespo 44'	Stadium: Stadio Olimpico; Referee: Stefano Braschi

20 April 1997 28	Parma	0–2	Udinese	Parma
		Report	Pierini 67'; Bierhoff 87' (pen.)	Stadium: Stadio Ennio Tardini; Referee: Cosimo Bolognino

4 May 1997 29	Atalanta	1–2	Parma	Bergamo
	Lentini 37'	Report	Crespo 45'; Chiesa 62'	Stadium: Stadio Atleti Azzurri d'Italia; Referee: Livio Bazzoli

11 May 1997 30	Parma	3–0	Vicenza	Parma
	Crespo 16', 56', 60'	Report		Stadium: Stadio Ennio Tardini; Referee: Pasquale Rodomonti

15 May 1997 31	Parma	1–1	Milan	Parma
	Chiesa 7'	Report	Albertini 71' (pen.)	Stadium: Stadio Ennio Tardini; Referee: Robert Anthony Boggi

18 May 1997 32	Juventus	1–1	Parma	Turin
	Amoruso 43' (pen.)	Report	Zidane 29' (o.g.)	Stadium: Stadio delle Alpi; Referee: Pierluigi Collina

25 May 1997 33	Parma	1–0	Bologna	Parma
	Chiesa 73'	Report		Stadium: Stadio Ennio Tardini; Referee: Fiorenzo Treossi

1 June 1997 34	Hellas Verona	1–2	Parma	Verona
	Orlandini 6'	Report	Chiesa 17'; Crespo 63'	Stadium: Stadio Marc'Antonio Bentegodi; Referee: Emilio Pellegrino

=== Coppa Italia ===
28 August 1996 Second round	Pescara	3–1	Parma	Pescara
	Palladini 1', 2'; Giampaolo 38'		Melli 85'	Stadium: Stadio Adriatico; Referee: Pierluigi Collina

=== UEFA Cup ===
==== First round ====
10 September 1996 First leg	Parma (Italy)	2–1	(Portugal) Vitória de Guimarães	Parma, Italy
20:45 CEST (UTC+02:00)	Chiesa 40', 82'; Bravo (yellow card) 88'	Report	Ferreira (yellow card) 36'; Freitas (yellow card) 42'; Medeiros (yellow card) 71'; Gilmar 77'; Souza (yellow card) 79'; Quim Berto (yellow card) 81'; Barros (yellow card) 86'; Vesga (red card) 89'	Stadium: Stadio Ennio Tardini; Referee: Georgios Bikas (Greece)

24 September 1996 Second leg	Vitória de Guimarães (Portugal)	2–0 (3–2 agg.)	(Italy) Parma	Guimarães, Portugal
20:00 CEST (UTC+02:00)	Vítor Paneira 15', (yellow card) 88'; Gilmar (yellow card) 22'; Ricardo Lopes 49'; Freitas (yellow card) 74'	Report	Amaral (yellow card) 26'; Bravo (yellow card) 60'	Stadium: Estádio D. Afonso Henriques; Referee: Marc Batta (France)

== Statistics ==
=== Players statistics ===
No.	Pos	Nat	Player	Total		Serie A		Coppa		UEFA	
No.	Pos	Nat	Player	Apps	Goals	Apps	Goals	Apps	Goals	Apps	Goals
12	GK	(Italy) ITA	Buffon	28	-19	27	-17	0	0	1	-2
14	DF	(Italy) ITA	Mussi	31	0	21+7	0	1	0	2	0
21	DF	(France) FRA	Thuram	37	1	34	1	1	0	2	0
17	DF	(Italy) ITA	Cannavaro	30	0	25+2	0	1	0	2	0
3	DF	(Italy) ITA	Benarrivo	24	1	22	1	1	0	1	0
9	MF	(Italy) ITA	Crippa	31	1	25+3	1	1	0	2	0
8	MF	(Italy) ITA	Baggio	34	2	31	2	1	0	2	0
7	MF	(Argentina) ARG	Sensini	33	1	30+1	1	0	0	2	0
18	MF	(Italy) ITA	Strada	27	1	20+7	1	0	0	0	0
20	FW	(Italy) ITA	Chiesa	31	16	29	14	0	0	2	2
11	FW	(Argentina) ARG	Crespo	28	12	24+3	12	1	0		
1	GK	(Italy) ITA	Bucci	9	-13	7	-9	1	-3	1	-1
22	DF	(Brazil) BRA	Zé Maria	25	1	21+4	1	0	0	0	0
6	MF	(France) FRA	Bravo	27	0	17+7	0	1	0	2	0
26	MF	(Croatia) CRO	Stanic	13	3	13	3				
	FW	(Italy) ITA	Zola	11	2	8	2	1	0	2	0
19	FW	(Italy) ITA	Melli	21	1	5+13	0	1	1	2	0
	MF	(Italy) ITA	Brambilla	10	0	5+4	0	0	0	1	0
2	DF	(Italy) ITA	Apolloni	8	1	5+3	-1				
32	FW	(Sweden) SWE	Brolin	11	0	3+8	0				
31	MF	(France) FRA	Pedros	4	0	2+2	0				
	MF	(Brazil) BRA	Amaral	6	0	0+4	0	0	0	2	0
16	FW	(Italy) ITA	Triuzzi	2	0	0+2	0				
25	MF	(Italy) ITA	Barone	2	0	0+2	0				
24	DF	(Italy) ITA	Luca Pinton	1	0	0+1	0				
23	GK	(Italy) ITA	Nista	0	0	0	0				
27	DF	(Italy) ITA	Sapienza								
29	FW	(Italy) ITA	Miccoli								

- Source: http://calcio-seriea.net/allenatori_squadra/1996/1114/
