= Salvatore Miceli (footballer) =

Italian footballer

Personal information
- Date of birth: 5 March 1974 (age 52)
- Place of birth: Paola, Italy
- Height: 1.75 m (5 ft 9 in)
- Position: Midfielder

Youth career
- 1992–1993: Cosenza

Senior career*
Years	Team	Apps	(Gls)
1993–1997	Cosenza	100	(8)
1993–1994	→ Fasano (loan)	22	(0)
1997–2000	Venezia	76	(3)
1999–2000	→ Napoli (loan)	28	(0)
2001–2004	Piacenza	66	(2)
2003	→ Sampdoria (loan)	4	(0)
2004	Catania	17	(1)
2005–2006	Catanzaro	40	(3)
2007	Ternana	16	(0)
- * Club domestic league appearances and goals

Salvatore Miceli (born 5 March 1974) is a retired Italian footballer.

In January 2003, he was exchanged with Sandro Cois.
