= Edmundo (footballer) =

Brazilian footballer (born 1971)

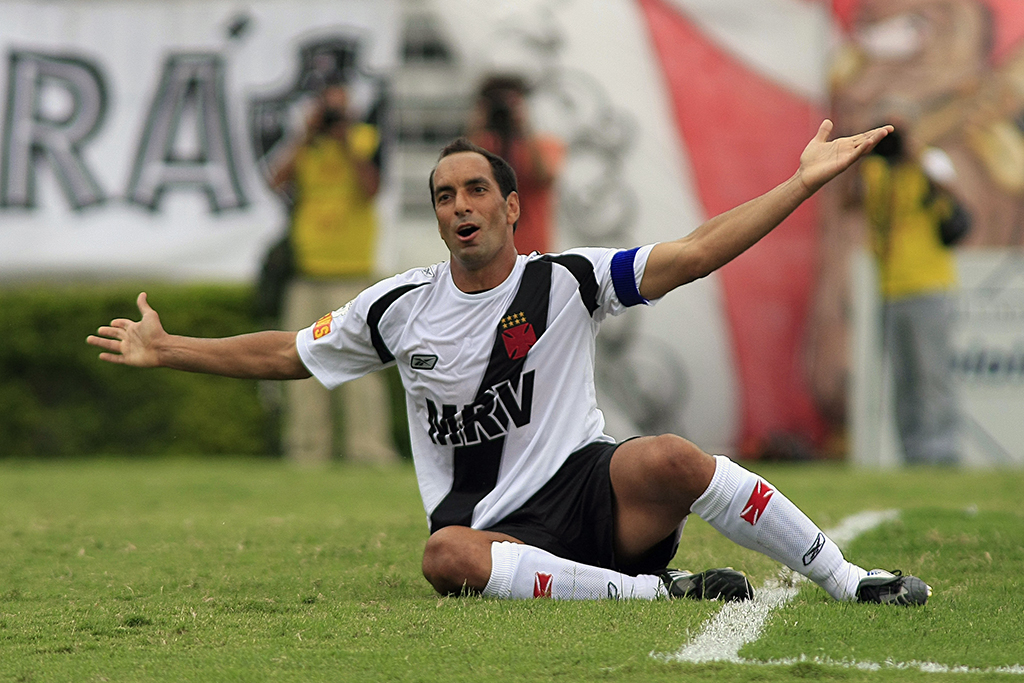
- Edmundo playing for Vasco da Gama in 2008

Personal information
- Full name: Edmundo Alves de Souza Neto
- Date of birth: 2 April 1971 (age 55)
- Place of birth: Niterói, Brazil
- Height: 1.77 m (5 ft 10 in)
- Position: Forward

Youth career
- 1982–1986: Vasco da Gama
- 1987–1989: Botafogo
- 1990–1991: Vasco da Gama

Senior career*
Years	Team	Apps	(Gls)
1991–1992	Vasco da Gama	23	(8)
1993–1995	Palmeiras	40	(20)
1994	→ Parma (loan)	0	(0)
1995–1996	Flamengo	14	(2)
1996	→ Corinthians (loan)	0	(0)
1996–1997	Vasco da Gama	44	(38)
1998–1999	Fiorentina	37	(12)
1999–2001	Vasco da Gama	17	(13)
2000	→ Santos (loan)	20	(13)
2001	→ Napoli (loan)	17	(4)
2001	Cruzeiro	12	(3)
2001–2002	Tokyo Verdy	31	(18)
2003	Urawa Red Diamonds	0	(0)
2003	Vasco da Gama	20	(7)
2004	Fluminense	19	(7)
2005	Nova Iguaçu	2	(1)
2005	Figueirense	31	(15)
2006–2007	Palmeiras	49	(14)
2008	Vasco da Gama	25	(13)
Total		377	(177)

International career
1992–2000	Brazil	37	(9)
Medal record
Men's Football
Representing Brazil
FIFA World Cup
Runner-up	1998 France
Copa América
Winner	1997 Bolivia
Runner-up	1995 Uruguay
CONCACAF Gold Cup
Bronze medal – third place	1998 USA
- * Club domestic league appearances and goals

Edmundo Alves de Souza Neto (born 2 April 1971), better known simply as Edmundo, is a Brazilian football pundit and retired footballer who played as a forward. Nicknamed O Animal, (Note: lit. 'The Animal') he was a talented yet controversial footballer and drew attention both for his skill, as well as for his volatile behaviour, both on and off the pitch.

Edmundo started his professional career in Vasco da Gama in 1991, making his debut in 1992, where he won the Cariocão Grupo A in 1992. In 1993, he signed with Palmeiras, where he was part of the team that won the Brasileirão Série A in 1993 and 1994 and the Paulistão Série A1 in 1993, which ended the club's 17-year major title drought, and 1994, with a loan spell at Parma in 2000. In 1995, he moved to Flamengo and in 1996, after a loan spell in Corinthians, he returned to Vasco da Gama, where he won the Brasileirão Série A in 1997, netting 29 goals in 28 games, breaking the then Brasileirão Série A scoring record for a season. In 1998, he moved to Italian club Fiorentina. In 1999, he returned to Vasco da Gama. After loans to Santos and Napoli and a spell at Cruzeiro, in 2001, he moved to Japan, where he played in Tokyo Verdy and Urawa Red Diamonds. In 2003, he moved to Vasco da Gama, and after spells at Fluminense, Nova Iguaçu, Figueirense and Palmeiras, he returned to Vasco da Gama in 2008, where he retired, returning in 2012 to a testimonial match.

Edmundo played for Brazil national team from 1992 to 2000. He played the World Cup in 1998, where Brazil reached the final and finished runner-up. He played three Copa América editions, in 1993, 1995 and 1997, winning the 1997 and finished runner-up in 1995. He also played the CONCACAF Gold Cup in 1998.

== Club career ==
=== Vasco da Gama ===
Born in Niterói, Edmundo played for several clubs throughout his career, both in his native country of Brazil and abroad. However, the history of Edmundo, as a football player, is strongly intertwined with Vasco da Gama. He began his career with the club in the amateur divisions in 1982, also later playing for the Botafogo youth side before returning to the club. He went on to make his debut as professional with the Vasco da Gama senior side, where he remained until 1992.

He returned to the club in 1996, and in 1997, when Vasco won the Brasileirão Série A, he was the season's top scorer, his twenty-nine goals breaking a record set by Reinaldo of Atlético Mineiro twenty years earlier. In that same year, Vasco da Gama scored sixty-nine goals. That season, Edmundo was named the league's player of the year. He also scored six goals in a match against União São João. After moving between several clubs abroad, he returned to Vasco da Gama in 1999, where he joined his international team-mate Romário and was initially handed the captain's armband, reaching the final of the 2000 Club World Championship, defeating Manchester United in the process; he was later kicked off the team in 2000 by vice-president Eurico Miranda for lack of discipline, however, after he left the dressing-room before a game. He returned to Vasco da Gama again in 2003, where he remained until the end of the season when was released after scoring only seven goals in nineteen appearances. He returned to Vasco da Gama in 2008, when he played the last season of his career. In total, he made 127 appearances with the club.

Regarding his attachment to the club, Edmundo stated that his love for Vasco da Gama was like that between a son and his mother. On 28 March 2012, he played his testimonial match when Vasco da Gama hosted Barcelona de Guayaquil in a friendly match. The game ended 9–1 with Edmundo scoring twice.

=== Career in Brazil ===
In 1993, Edmundo left Vasco da Gama and transferred to Palmeiras, where he won the Brasileirão twice, in 1993 and 1994, scoring thirty-four goals in eighty-nine appearances for the club. Despite his success, he had several disputes with his manager Vanderlei Luxemburgo, and was involved in an altercation with his team-mate Antônio Carlos, which led to Edmundo being sacked by the club. On 27 June 1995 he joined Flamengo who paid Palmeiras 5.5 million dollars, one of the highest transfer fees in Brazilian football. However he stayed in Flamengo for a season in 1995 (two goals in fourteen appearances), and subsequently signed for Corinthians in 1996, although he failed to make an appearance for the club, as he reportedly stormed out of a training session after an argument. He later joined Santos on loan in 2000 (scoring thirteen goals in twenty appearances), and Cruzeiro in 2001 (three goals in thirteen appearances). After another spell at Vasco da Gama, he joined Fluminense in 2004, scoring seven goals in twenty appearances, and also scored one goal in two appearances whilst playing for Nova Iguaçu in 2005.

=== Time in Italy, return to Brazil and Japan ===
In 1997, Italian club Fiorentina purchased Edmundo for 13 billion lire (approx. 8 million dollars at the time), and he remained with the team until 1999. Despite putting on some spectacular performances during his tenure in Florence, which initially endeared him with the fans, his stint in Italy was also marked by inconsistency and controversy, which drew criticism from the press. One particular incident which drew much publicity occurred during the 1998–99 season, under manager Giovanni Trapattoni; Edmundo left the club midway through the season in order to attend the Rio Carnival. Although at that point Fiorentina were first in the league, due to his absence, as well as strike partner Gabriel Batistuta's injury, Fiorentina missed out on the league title at the end of the season, and as a result, Edmundo had a falling out with the club, his manager, and his team-mates.

In April 1999, he returned to Vasco da Gama, who paid Fiorentina a record 23 billion lire (payable in two installments). There, he created a lethal partnership in attack with Romário with whom they were not in speaking terms. Edmundo captained Vasco at the 2000 FIFA Club World Championship, where they reached the final only to lose to Corinthians on penalties, with him missing the decisive kick.

In January 2001, he was sent out on loan to Napoli, where he remained until June. He was injured during his debut with the club against Udinese however, which kept him sidelined, and was unable to prevent the club's relegation to Serie B at the end of the season.

Later that year, he joined J1 League club Tokyo Verdy, scoring eighteen goals in thirty-one appearances, and remaining with the club until 2002. He joined Japanese club Urawa Red Diamonds in 2003, but did not make a single appearance for the team.

=== Later years ===
During the end of his career, Edmundo still managed to perform well, despite not being as physically strong or fit as he had been during his prime in the mid-90s, although his performances became increasingly less consistent with age. Nevertheless, his football skills and goalscoring proved to be fundamental in helping Figueirense avoid relegation in the 2005 Brasileirão Série A, as he managed fifteen goals in thirty-one appearances. The following season, he also saved Palmeiras from relegation during the 2006 Brasileirão Série A.

Along with Jorge Valdivia and Marcos, Edmundo was one of the most important footballers for Palmeiras during the 2007 season; however, his contract was not renewed at the end of the season. There are two versions of this fact: according to the "official" one, his salary was too high for his irregular performances. But it is more possible that the actual reason was that Caio Júnior, who was favorable to this permanence, was sacked and Vanderlei Luxemburgo, who has personal problems with Edmundo, was hired.

In January 2008, Edmundo returned to Vasco da Gama, although he was not able to prevent the club's relegation to the 2009 Campeonato Brasileiro Série B. Edmundo announced retirement from football on 30 May 2008, but he returned to play until the end of 2008 season.

== International career ==
At international level, Edmundo made forty-two appearances for Brazil between 1992 and 2000, scoring ten goals. He was a member of the team that won the 1997 Copa América, and also made two substitute appearances at the 1998 FIFA World Cup, including the final where the team lost 3–0 to hosts France and finished in second place. Additionally, Edmundo was a member of the Brazil squad that took part at the 1993 and 1995 Copa América tournaments, winning a runners-up medal in the latter edition; he also won a bronze medal at the 1998 CONCACAF Gold Cup. Furthermore, he took part in two exhibition tournaments with the Brazil national side, winning the 1995 Umbro Cup, and finishing second in the 1997 Tournoi de France. Despite his talent, however, Edmundo's turbulent lifestyle off the pitch, as well as extensive competition from several world-class Brazilian forwards at the time (including Bebeto, Romário, and Ronaldo), are thought to have limited his playing time at international level.

== Style of play ==
Edmundo was a quick, powerful, creative, and technically gifted player, who was known for his pace, strength, acceleration, and his outstanding dribbling skills, as well as his use of feints, including the Pelé runaround move; as a second striker, he was capable of both scoring and assisting many goals. A versatile forward, Edmundo played primarily as a second striker, but was capable to play as a winger or even as a main striker or attacking midfielder. Despite his talent, he was also a tenacious and controversial footballer, who was criticised for his poor work-rate and lack of consistency at times; he was also known for his aggression and poor behaviour on the pitch, which often led him to pick up cards, and earned him the nickname '"O Animal ("The Animal").

== Outside football ==
In the middle of 2009, Edmundo became a football pundit for Rede TV!. In the beginning of 2010, Rede Bandeirantes hired him; he was part of the broadcaster's journalistics team in the 2010 FIFA World Cup and UEFA Euro 2012 coverages.

== Controversies ==
Known for his tenacious style of play and aggressive behaviour, as well as his skill on the pitch, Edmundo was also involved in several incidents off the pitch throughout his career; he had several disagreements with his managers and officials, and was known for his "partying". In 1999, he faced prosecution by animal welfare groups after hiring an entire circus to perform in his back garden to celebrate his son's first birthday. At the party, he was accused by some individuals of the press of encouraging a chimpanzee called Pedrinho to be drunk on beer and whiskey. Subsequent images of this appeared in the media (including the February 2004 issue of the UK version of FHM magazine) and have passed into football legend. The same year, during his turbulent time with Fiorentina, he also escaped a four-year prison sentence for driving drunk and crashing his car during the Rio Carnival of 1995, resulting in the deaths of three people; for his behaviour he received a seven-day suspended sentence. In 1998, due to his difficult relationship with the Florentine club, he suddenly left for the Rio Carnival halfway through the season, and was two days late in returning to Florence according to the Italian newspaper Il Corriere della Sera.

== Career statistics ==
=== Club ===
Appearances and goals by club, season and competition
Club	Season	League			National cup (Note: Includes Copa do Brasil, Coppa Italia, Japan Emperor's Cup.)		League cup (Note: J.League Cup.)		State (Note: Includes Brazilian states' tournaments leagues.)			Continental (Note: Includes continental competitions such as Copa Libertadores.)		Other (Note: Includes also competitions such as national and intercontinental super cups and the Club World Cup.)		Total	
Club	Season	Division	Apps	Goals	Apps	Goals	Apps	Goals	Division	Apps	Goals	Apps	Goals	Apps	Goals	Apps	Goals
Vasco da Gama	1991	Brasileirão Série A							Cariocão Série A								
Vasco da Gama	1992	Brasileirão Série A	23	8		1			Cariocão Série A		5						14
Vasco da Gama	Total																
Palmeiras	1993	Brasileirão Série A	19	11		2			Paulistão Série A1		11						23
Palmeiras	1994	Brasileirão Série A							Paulistão Série A1		8						8
Palmeiras	1994	Brasileirão Série A	21	9					Paulistão Série A1								9
Palmeiras	1995	Brasileirão Série A				2			Paulistão Série A1		8		5 (Note: Appearances and goals in Copa Libertadores)				15
Palmeiras	Total																
Parma (loan)	1993–94	Serie A					—		—			—					
Flamengo	1995	Brasileirão Série A	14	2					Cariocão Série A				2 (Note: Appearances and goals in Supercopa Libertadores)				4
Corinthians (loan)	1996	Brasileirão Série A			5	3			Paulistão Série A1	14	14	10	5			29	22
Vasco da Gama	1996	Brasileirão Série A	16	9					Cariocão Série A				2 (Note: Appearances and goals in Copa CONMEBOL)				11
Vasco da Gama	1997	Brasileirão Série A	28	29					Cariocão Série A		9		2				40
Vasco da Gama	Total		44	38													
Fiorentina	1997–98	Serie A	9	4	1	0	—		—			—				10	4
Fiorentina	1998–99	Serie A	28	8	6	2	—		—			4 (Note: Appearances and goals in UEFA Cup)	2			38	12
Fiorentina	Total		37	12	7	2	—		—			4	2			48	16
Vasco da Gama	1999	Brasileirão Série A	17	13					Cariocão Série A	4	3					21	16
Vasco da Gama	2000	Brasileirão Série A			3	3			Cariocão Série A	10	9			4 (Note: Appearances and goals in Club World Championship)	2		14
Vasco da Gama	Total																
Santos (loan)	2000	Brasileirão Série A	20	13					Paulistão Série A1								13
Napoli (loan)	2000–01	Serie A	17	4	0	0	—		—			—				17	4
Cruzeiro	2001	Brasileirão Série A	12	3	—				Mineiro Módulo I				3 (Note: Appearances and goals in Copa Mercosur)				6
Tokyo Verdy	2001	J1 League	5	2	3	2	0	0	—			—				8	4
Tokyo Verdy	2002	J1 League	26	16	0	0	6	5	—			—				32	21
Tokyo Verdy	Total		31	18	3	2	6	5	—			—				40	25
Urawa Reds	2003	J1 League	0	0	0	0	2	0	—			—				2	0
Vasco da Gama	2003	Brasileirão Série A	20	7					Cariocão Série A								7
Fluminense	2004	Brasileirão Série A	19	7					Cariocão Série A		2						9
Nova Iguaçu	2005	Copa Rio			—				Cariocão Série B1		1						1
Figueirense	2005	Brasileirão Série A	31	15					Catarinense Divisão Principal								15
Palmeiras	2006	Brasileirão Série A	29	10	—				Paulistão Série A1		6		3				19
Palmeiras	2007	Brasileirão Série A	20	4					Paulistão Série A1		12						16
Palmeiras	Total		49	14													
Vasco da Gama	2008	Brasileirão Série A	25	13		6			Cariocão Série A		5						24
Career total			377	177													

=== International ===
Appearances and goals by national team and year
National team	Year	Apps	Goals
Brazil	1992	4	1
Brazil	1993	5	1
Brazil	1994	0	0
Brazil	1995	12	5
Brazil	1996	1	0
Brazil	1997	5	1
Brazil	1998	8	1
Brazil	1999	0	0
Brazil	2000	2	0
Total		37	9

=== International goals ===
Scores and results list Brazil's goal tally first, score column indicates score after each Edmundo goal.

List of international goals scored by Edmundo
No.	Date	Venue	Opponent	Score	Result	Competition	Ref.
1	25 November 1992	Amigão, Campina Grande, Brazil	Uruguay	1–0	1–2	Friendly	
2	24 June 1993	Estadio Alejandro Serrano Aguilar, Cuenca, Ecuador	Paraguay	2–0	3–0	1993 Copa América	
3	4 June 1995	Villa Park, Birmingham, England	Sweden	1–0	1–0	Friendly	
4	11 June 1995	Wembley Stadium, London, England	England	3–1	3–1	Friendly	
5	10 July 1995	Estadio Atilio Paiva Olivera, Rivera, Uruguay	Peru	2–0	2–0	1995 Copa América	
6	1 July 1995	Estadio Atilio Paiva Olivera, Rivera, Uruguay	Argentina	1–1	2–2	1995 Copa América	
7	9 August 1995	National Stadium, Tokyo, Japan	Japan	2–0	5–1	Friendly	
8	19 June 1997	Estadio Ramón Tahuichi Aguilera, Santa Cruz, Bolivia	Colombia	2–0	2–0	1997 Copa América	
9	8 February 1998	Los Angeles Memorial Coliseum, Los Angeles, United States	El Salvador	1–0	4–0	1998 CONCACAF Gold Cup	

== Honours ==
Vasco da Gama

- Rio de Janeiro State Championship: 1992
- Brasileirão Série A: 1997
- Torneio Rio-São Paulo runner-up: 2000
- FIFA Club World Cup runner-up: 2000

Palmeiras

- Brasileirão Série A: 1993, 1994
- São Paulo State Championship: 1993, 1994
- Rio de Janeiro-São Paulo Tournament: 1993

Flamengo

- Supercopa Libertadores runner-up: 1995

ACF Fiorentina

- Coppa Italia runner-up: 1998-99

Nova Iguaçu FC

- Campeonato Carioca Série A2: 2005

Brazil

- Umbro Cup: 1995
- Copa América: 1997
- FIFA World Cup runner-up: 1998

Individual

- Bola de Ouro: 1997
- Bola de Prata: 1993, 1997
- South American Team of the Year: 1995, 1997
- South American Player of the Year Bronze Ball: 1995
- Chuteira de Ouro: 1997
- Copa do Brazil top scorer: 2008
- Brasileirão Série A top scorer: 1997
- FIFA Club World Cup Silver Ball: 2000
