= Pasquale Padalino =

Italian footballer and manager

Personal information
- Date of birth: 26 July 1972 (age 54)
- Place of birth: Foggia, Italy
- Height: 1.80 m (5 ft 11 in)
- Position: Central defender

Team information
- Current team: Città di Fasano (head coach)

Youth career
- Foggia

Senior career*
Years	Team	Apps	(Gls)
1988–1992	Foggia	62	(1)
1992–1993	Bologna	18	(0)
1993–1994	Lecce	30	(3)
1994–1995	Foggia	28	(0)
1995–2000	Fiorentina	107	(8)
2000–2002	Bologna	15	(0)
2001–2002	→ Internazionale (loan)	0	(0)
2002–2004	Como	15	(1)

International career
1996	Italy	1	(0)

Managerial career
- 2009–2010: Nocerina
- 2012–2014: Foggia
- 2014–2015: Grosseto
- 2015–2016: Matera
- 2016–2017: Lecce
- 2018–2019: Foggia
- 2020–2021: Juve Stabia
- 2021–2022: Siena
- 2022: Turris
- 2024: Latina
- 2025–: Città di Fasano
- * Club domestic league appearances and goals

Pasquale Padalino (Italian pronunciation: [paˈskwaːle padaˈliːno]; born 26 July 1972) is an Italian football manager and a former central defender, currently in charge of Serie D club Città di Fasano.

== Playing career ==
=== Club ===
During his career, Padalino represented Foggia, Bologna (two stints), Lecce, Fiorentina (where he formed an interesting defensive partnership with Lorenzo Amoruso, later of Rangers), Inter Milan (having only appeared once, in an Italian Cup contest against Udinese where he got injured on his right knee, after a contrast with Roberto Muzzi and missed out the rest of the season) and Como, where he ended his career in 2004.

=== International ===
Padalino's only international cap came in 1996, in a friendly against Bosnia-Herzegovina.

== Coaching career ==
Having retired in 2004, Padalino started as assistant coach to cousin Gian Piero Ventura at Hellas Verona, leaving at the end of the season to rejoin the first team at Foggia, as its administrative secretary.

In 2007–08, Padalino rejoined Ventura as his assistant at Pisa, also in the second level.

In 2009–10, Padalino started his career as head coach at Nocerina in the Seconda Divisione until the end of the season.

On 7 August 2012, he was named the new coach of Foggia in the Serie D. He led the team to promotion to Lega Pro in 2014 and then left the club.

In November 2014, he became the new manager of Grosseto in the Lega Pro, but he was fired in January 2015, before the end of the season.

On 5 October 2015, he was appointed as the new coach of Matera, ending the season in sixth place in the Lega Pro.

On 13 June 2016, he was named as the new coach of Lecce in the Lega Pro. He was sacked on 24 April 2017 with two games to spare.

He returned into management on 18 December 2018 after being appointed head coach of Foggia, in the Serie B league.

On 13 August 2020, he was hired by Juve Stabia, freshly relegated to Serie C. He left the club at the end of the 2020–21 season.

On 29 December 2021, Padalino was appointed as the new head coach of Serie C club Siena. On 12 May 2022, Siena announced Padalino's departure from the club.

On 30 August 2022, he was signed by Turris, another Serie C club. On 25 October 2022, less than months since his appointment, Padalino tendered his resignation and left Turris.

In July 2024, Padalino was hired by Serie C club Latina; he was sacked on 20 October 2024 following a string of negative results.

On 9 December 2025, Padalino took over at Serie D club Città di Fasano.

== Managerial statistics ==
As of 19 May 2021

Managerial record by team and tenure
Team	Nat	From	To	Record							
Team	Nat	From	To	G	W	D	L	GF	GA	GD	Win %
Nocerina	(Italy)	2 November 2009	15 March 2010	16	4	8	4	15	14	+1	25.00
Foggia	(Italy)	7 August 2012	29 May 2014	74	30	26	18	110	82	+28	40.54
Grosseto	(Italy)	4 November 2014	13 January 2015	9	3	3	3	13	12	+1	33.33
Matera	(Italy)	6 October 2015	12 May 2016	30	13	11	6	44	29	+15	43.33
Lecce	(Italy)	13 June 2016	24 April 2017	41	24	9	8	80	53	+27	58.54
Foggia	(Italy)	18 December 2018	10 March 2019	12	2	6	4	10	14	−4	16.67
Juve Stabia	(Italy)	17 August 2020	30 June 2021	40	19	8	13	54	45	+9	47.50
Siena	(Italy)	29 December 2021	30 June 2022	18	4	9	5	18	19	−1	22.22
Total				240	99	80	61	344	268	+76	41.25

== Honours ==
=== Club ===
Fiorentina

- Italian Cup: 1995–96, runner-up 1998–99
- Italian Supercup: 1996
