= USD Città di Fasano =

Italian football club

Fasano
- Full name: Associazione Sportiva Fasano
- Founded: 1964; 2012 (refounded)
- Ground: Stadio Vito Curlo, Fasano, Italy
- Capacity: 4,900
- Chairman: Ivan Ghilardi
- Manager: Pasquale Padalino
- League: Serie D/H
- 2025–26: bankruptcy
Home colours	Away colours

Unione Sportiva Dilettantistica Città di Fasano was an Italian association football club based in Fasano, Apulia.
