= Alessandro Nista =

Italian footballer (born 1965)

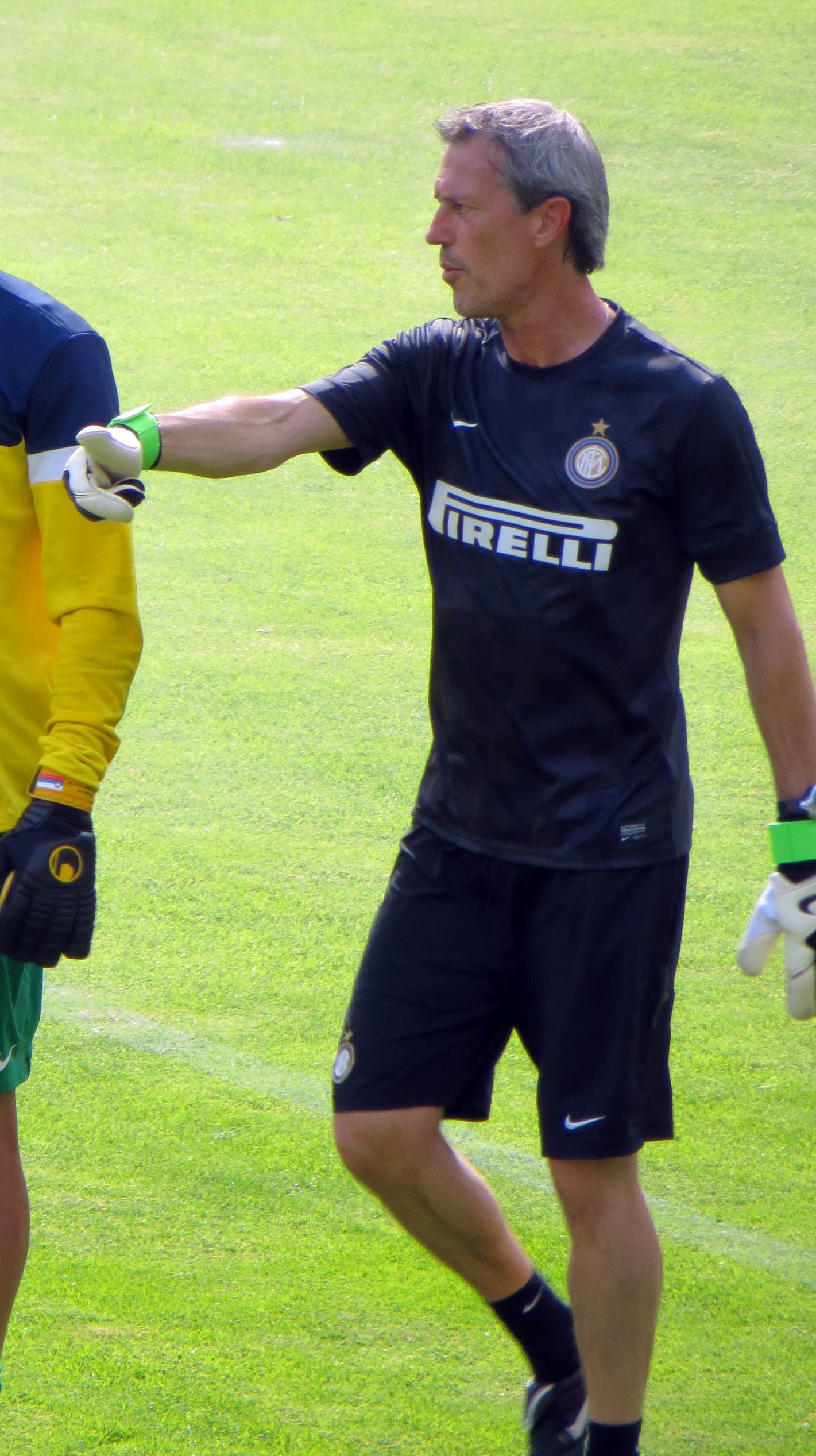
- Nista with Inter Milan in 2012

Personal information
- Full name: Alessandro Nista
- Date of birth: 10 July 1965 (age 61)
- Place of birth: Collesalvetti, Italy
- Height: 1.90 m (6 ft 3 in)
- Position: Goalkeeper

Youth career
- 1982–1985: Pisa

Senior career*
Years	Team	Apps	(Gls)
1985–1986	Sorrento	3	(0)
1986–1990	Pisa	38	(0)
1990	Leeds United	0	(0)
1990–1995	Ancona	139	(0)
1995–1999	Parma	2	(0)
1999–2001	Torino	1	(0)

International career
1988	Italy U21	3	(0)
- * Club domestic league appearances and goals

Alessandro Nista (born 10 July 1965) is an Italian former footballer who played as a goalkeeper. A talented goalkeeper in his youth, he was once thought to be the heir of Walter Zenga for the Italy national team, although he failed to live up to his reputation, despite a successful club career.

== Club career ==
Nista has played with Sorrento, Pisa, Leeds United, Ancona, Parma, and Torino in his career, serving mainly as a backup goalkeeper in later years. With Pisa, Nista won the Serie B title in 1985, and the Mitropa Cup in 1987, also winning the English Football League Second Division Title with Leeds in 1990. With Parma, Nista won a Coppa Italia and an UEFA Cup double in 1999, although he was mainly a reserve behind goalkeepers Giovanni Galli, Luca Bucci, and Gianluigi Buffon during his time at the club. In total, he made 66 career appearances in Serie A, 114 in Serie B, and 3 in Serie C1. Marco van Basten scored both his first and final goals in Serie A against Nista, in 1987 and 1993, respectively.

== International career ==
At international level, Nista also represented the Italy national under-21 football team on 3 occasions in 1988.

== Coaching career ==
Following his retirement in 2001, Nista worked as a goalkeeping coach with his former club, Torino. He later moved to work with Reggina, in 2007, and Grosseto, in 2008, before moving to work at Juventus in 2009, training his former Parma teammate Gianluigi Buffon. He worked as the goalkeeping coach for Serie A side Internazionale between 2010 and 2013. He is currently the goalkeeping coach for Serie A side Napoli.

== Honours ==
=== Club ===
Pisa

- Serie B: 1984–85
- Mitropa Cup: 1987–88

Leeds United

- English Football Second Division: 1989–90

Parma

- Coppa Italia: 1998–99
- UEFA Cup: 1998–99

Torino

- Serie B: 2000–01
