= Gianluca Triuzzi =

Italian footballer

Personal information
- Date of birth: 9 September 1978 (age 48)
- Place of birth: Taranto, Italy
- Height: 1.77 m (5 ft 10 in)
- Position: Centre-forward

Youth career
- –1994: Taranto

Senior career*
Years	Team	Apps	(Gls)
1994–1996	Taranto	23	(2)
1996–1997	Parma	2	(0)
1997–1998	Palermo	25	(7)
1998	Napoli	4	(1)
1999	Palermo	12	(1)
1999–2000	Monza	26	(0)
2000–2001	Spezia	14	(0)
2001–2004	Taranto	79	(13)
2004–2006	Pescara	6	(0)
2006–2008	Virtus Lanciano	20	(1)
2008–2009	Grottaglie		

Managerial career
- 2018: Taranto (team manager)
- 2018–2019: Taranto (assistant)
- 2019: Taranto (team manager)
- 2019–2020: Taranto (assistant)
- 2022–2023: Taranto (technical coach)
- * Club domestic league appearances and goals

Gianluca Triuzzi (born 9 September 1978) is an Italian professional football coach and a former forward.

== Playing career ==
Triuzzi played in Serie A earlier in his career, notably for Parma, for whom he played in two matches in the 1996–97 season.
