= Lorenzo Collacchioni =

Italian footballer

Personal information
- Full name: Lorenzo Collacchioni
- Date of birth: August 9, 1980 (age 46)
- Place of birth: Florence, Italy
- Height: 1.81 m (5 ft 11 in)
- Position: Defender

Team information
- Current team: Pistoiese (assistant)

Senior career*
Years	Team	Apps	(Gls)
1999–2000	Fiorentina	0	(0)
1999–2000	→ Pisa (loan)	10	(0)
2000	Salernitana	0	(0)
2000	Avellino	0	(0)
2000–2001	Rondinella	20	(1)
2002	Nocerina	8	(0)
2002–2007	Pistoiese	129	(6)
2007–2008	Cisco Roma	8	(0)
2008	Lucchese	0	(0)
2008–2010	Olbia	25	(0)
2010–2011	Prato	17	(0)
2011–2012	Quarrata		
2012–2014	Pistoiese	49	(5)
2014	Porta Romana		
2014–2015	Siena	15	(1)

International career
1996	Italy U16	2	(0)

Managerial career
- 2019–2021: Fucecchio
- 2021–2022: San Miniato Basso
- 2022: Livorno
- 2023–2024: San Donato Tavarnelle
- * Club domestic league appearances and goals

Lorenzo Collacchioni (born 9 August 1980) is an Italian football coach and former player, currently in charge as the assistant coach of Serie D club Pistoiese.

== Playing career ==
A former defender, he started his career with hometown club Fiorentina. In 2000, he was part of the deal of Marco Rossi to A.C. Fiorentina. He was valued for 1 billion lire (€516,457). However, Collacchioni joined Avellino from Salernitana in the same transfer window. Collacchioni also never returned to Serie A nor Serie B again for the rest of his career. In 2014, he joined Eccellenza Tuscany club Porta Romana. However, in the same transfer window, he was signed by Serie D club Siena.

== Coaching career ==
After retiring as a player, Collacchioni started a career as a coach in the amateur leagues of Tuscany.

After working as a youth coach for Fucecchio, he was promoted to head coach in May 2019. After two seasons with Fucecchio, he left for fellow Eccellenza club San Miniato Basso for the 2021–22 season.

On 12 July 2022, he was unveiled as the new head coach of Livorno, originally scheduled to play Eccellenza but later readmitted to Serie D. On 31 October 2022, Collacchioni was dismissed following a 0–1 league defeat to Montespaccato, only to be called back one day later following a formal request by the team squad. Just a few days later, on 21 November, Collacchioni was however dismissed once again following a 0–3 defeat to promotion rivals Pianese.

On 1 June 2023, Collacchioni was unveiled as the new head coach of San Donato Tavarnelle for the club's upcoming Serie D campaign. Despite the club's ambitions to fight to return to Serie C after having been relegated the previous season, he failed in guiding San Donato into the top positions in the league table, and was ultimately dismissed on 19 February 2024.

On 5 November 2024, Collacchioni joined fellow Serie D club Pistoiese as assistant to new head coach Alberto Villa.
