= Memorial Mario Cecchi Gori =

The Memorial Mario Cecchi Gori was a summer association football friendly tournament that took place in the Stadio Artemio Franchi, Florence, Italy, from 1994 to 2000. The tournament organized by the ACF Fiorentina. The Trophy was created by Vittorio Cecchi Gori in memory of his father Mario, president of Fiorentina from 1990 to 1993 (the year of his death).

The teams played 3 round-robin 45-minute matches. If any match ended in a draw, it was decided by penalties.

== Titles ==
Year	Champion	Runners-Up	Third place
1994	(Italy) Parma A.C.	(Italy) Torino Calcio	(Italy) ACF Fiorentina
1995	(Italy) A.C. Fiorentina	(Italy) Vicenza Calcio	(Spain) FC Barcelona
1996	(Portugal) S.L. Benfica	(Italy) A.C. Fiorentina	(England) Arsenal F.C.
1997	(Italy) A.C. Fiorentina	(Italy) S.S. Lazio	(Brazil) Grêmio Esportivo Sãocarlense
1998	(France) AS Monaco	(Italy) A.C. Fiorentina	(Italy) S.S. Lazio
1999	(Italy) Torino Calcio	(Italy) A.C. Fiorentina	(Italy) A.S. Roma
2000	(Italy) A.C. Fiorentina	(Spain) Athletic Bilbao	(Italy) A.S. Roma
