= 1998–99 Coppa Italia =

Tournament details
- Country: Italy
- Dates: 23 Aug 1998 – 30 May 1999
- Teams: 48

Final positions
- Champions: Parma (2nd title)
- Runners-up: Fiorentina
- Third place: Bologna

Tournament statistics
- Matches played: 95
- Goals scored: 232 (2.44 per match)
- Top goal scorer: Hernán Crespo (6 goals)

The 1998–99 Coppa Italia was the 52nd edition of the tournament, which began on August 23, 1998, and ended on May 5, 1999. Parma won the 1998–99 Coppa Italia tournament for the 2nd time in club history and first since the 1991–92 competition. Parma defeated Fiorentina in the finals, winning on the away goals rule with an aggregate score of 3–3.

== Preliminary round ==
Team 1	Agg.	Team 2	1st leg	2nd leg
Lucchese (2)	4–2	Napoli (2)	2–2	2–0
Alzano Virescit (3)	2–3	Torino (2)	1–1	1–2
Ancona (3)	1–5	Ravenna (2)	0–1	1–4
Atletico Catania (3)	0–5	Brescia (2)	0–1	0–4
Castel di Sangro (3)	2–1	Perugia (1)	1–0	1–1
Cesena (2)	5–2	Pescara (2)	2–2	3–0
Chievo (2)	(a) 1–1	Foggia (3)	0–0	1–1
Cosenza (2)	(a) 3–3	Treviso (2)	1–1	2–2 (aet)
Cremonese (2)	1–4	Atalanta (2)	0–2	1–2
Gualdo (3)	2–1	Fidelis Andria (2)	1–1	1–0
Livorno (3)	1–4	Reggina (2)	1–1	0–3
Lumezzane (3)	3–3 (a)	Cagliari (1)	3–1	0–2
Monza (2)	0–2	Lecce (2)	0–2	0–0
Nocerina (3)	3–4	Hellas Verona (2)	2–2	1–2
Padova (3)	3–3 (6–5 p)	Reggiana (2)	2–1	1–2
Ternana (2)	3–4	Genoa (2)	1–1	2–3

p=after penalty shoot-out

== Round of 32 ==
Team 1	Agg.	Team 2	1st leg	2nd leg
Torino (2)	2–3	Milan (1)	2–0	0–3
Atalanta (2)	2–1	Empoli (1)	2–1	0–0
Brescia (2)	3–5	Vicenza (1)	3–2	0–3
Cagliari (1)	1–2	Venezia (1)	0–0	1–2
Castel di Sangro (3)	2–0	Salernitana (1)	0–0	2–0
Chievo (2)	3–4	Roma (1)	2–2	1–2
Gualdo (3)	2–6	Udinese (1)	2–2	0–4
Internazionale (1)	1–0	Cesena (2)	1–0	0–0
Lazio (1)	4–1	Cosenza (2)	2–1	2–0
Lecce (2)	(a) 4–4	Piacenza (1)	1–2	3–2 (aet)
Lucchese (2)	1–2	Bari (1)	1–0	1–2
Padova (2)	1–2	Fiorentina (1)	1–0	0–2
Parma (1)	4–0	Genoa (2)	3–0	1–0
Reggina (2)	1–4	Bologna (1)	1–1	0–3
Sampdoria (1)	2–1	Hellas Verona (2)	2–0	0–1
Ravenna (2)	0–6	Juventus (1)	0–2	0–4

== Round of 16 ==
Team 1	Agg.	Team 2	1st leg	2nd leg
Juventus (1)	(a) 3–3	Venezia (1)	1–1	2–2 (aet)
Atalanta (2)	2–2 (5–4 p)	Roma (1)	1–1	1–1
Bari (1)	1–2	Parma (1)	1–2	0–0
Fiorentina (1)	5–0	Lecce (2)	1–0	4–0
Internazionale (1)	2–1	Castel di Sangro (3)	1–0	1–1
Sampdoria (1)	1–2	Bologna (1)	0–0	1–2
Udinese (1)	1–0	Vicenza (1)	1–0	0–0
Lazio (1)	4–2	Milan (1)	3–1	1–1

p=after penalty shoot-out

== Quarter-finals ==
Team 1	Agg.	Team 2	1st leg	2nd leg
Udinese (1)	3–6	Parma (1)	3–2	0–4
Atalanta (2)	3–3 (a)	Fiorentina (1)	3–2	0–1
Lazio (1)	4–6	Internazionale (1)	2–1	2–5
Juventus (1)	2–2 (a)	Bologna (1)	1–2	1–0

== Semi-finals ==
Team 1	Agg.	Team 2	1st leg	2nd leg
Internazionale (1)	1–4	Parma (1)	0–2	1–2
Bologna (1)	2–4	Fiorentina (1)	0–2	2–2 (aet)

== Final ==
=== First leg ===
14 April 1999
20:00

Parma	1–1	Fiorentina
Crespo 16'		Batistuta 81'

Stadio Ennio Tardini, Parma
Attendance: 21,038
Referee: Domenico Messina

=== Second leg ===
5 May 1999
20:00

Fiorentina	2–2	Parma
Řepka 48'; Cois 62'		Crespo 42'; Vanoli 71'

Stadio Artemio Franchi, Florence
Attendance: 39,070
Referee: Stefano Braschi

3–3 on aggregate. Parma won on away goals rule.

== UEFA Cup playoff ==
Dates: 27 May 1999, 2nd leg: 30 May 1999

Team 1	Agg.	Team 2	1st leg	2nd leg
Internazionale	2-4	Bologna	1-2	1-2

== Top goalscorers ==
Rank	Player	Club	Goals
1	(Argentina) Hernán Crespo	Parma	6
2	(Chile) Marcelo Salas	Lazio	5
3	(Portugal) Rui Costa	Fiorentina	4
3	(Argentina) Gabriel Batistuta	Fiorentina	4
3	(Uruguay) Daniel Fonseca	Juventus	4
3	(France) Youri Djorkaeff	Internazionale	4
3	(Argentina) Abel Balbo	Parma	4
3	(Italy) Marco Ferrante	Torino	4
9	(Ghana) Stephen Appiah	Udinese	3
9	(Argentina) Roberto Sosa	Udinese	3
9	(Italy) Roberto De Palma	Nocerina	3
9	(Italy) Jonatan Binotto	Bologna	3
9	(Argentina) Juan Sebastián Verón	Parma	3
9	(Italy) Cristiano Doni	Atalanta	3
9	(Italy) Gianluca Luppi	Venezia	3
