= Carmine Esposito =

Italian footballer (born 1970)

Personal information
- Date of birth: 30 September 1970 (age 56)
- Place of birth: Naples, Italy
- Position: Forward

Senior career*
Years	Team	Apps	(Gls)
1990–1993	Casertana	55	(6)
1993–1994	Sambenedettese	31	(9)
1994–1995	Avellino	36	(4)
1995–1998	Empoli	86	(38)
1998–1999	Fiorentina	15	(2)
1999–2001	Sampdoria	37	(10)
2001	→ Vicenza (loan)	12	(0)
2001–2002	Sampdoria	21	(2)
2002–2003	Alessandria	5	(2)
2003–2004	Sambenedettese	20	(4)
2004–2005	Imolese	32	(4)
2005–2006	Forlì	5	(0)
2006–2007	Casalecchio		
2007–2008	Crespellano		
2008–2009	Anzolavino		
2009–2010	Casalecchio		
- * Club domestic league appearances and goals

Carmine Esposito (born 30 September 1970) is an Italian former professional footballer who played as a forward for Empoli, Fiorentina, Sampdoria and Vicenza, among other Italian clubs.
