= Tomáš Řepka =

Czech footballer

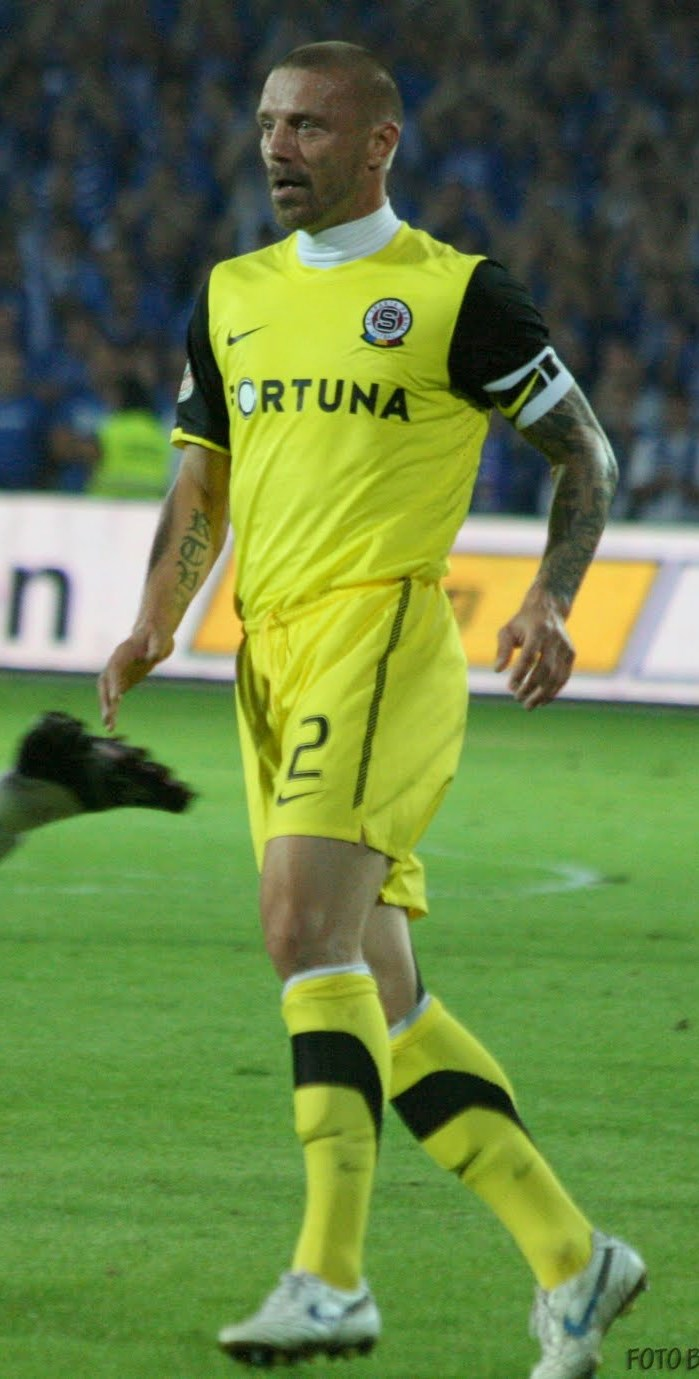
- Řepka with Sparta Prague in 2010

Personal information
- Date of birth: 2 January 1974 (age 52)
- Place of birth: Slavičín, Czechoslovakia
- Height: 1.83 m (6 ft 0 in)
- Position: Centre back

Youth career
- 1979–1989: Sokol Brumov
- 1989–1991: Svit Zlín

Senior career*
Years	Team	Apps	(Gls)
1991–1995	Baník Ostrava	77	(3)
1995–1998	Sparta Prague	82	(6)
1998–2001	Fiorentina	89	(0)
2001–2006	West Ham United	167	(0)
2006–2011	Sparta Prague	130	(2)
2011–2012	Dynamo České Budějovice	24	(1)

International career
1996	Czech Republic U21	2	(0)
1993	RCS	1	(0)
1994–2001	Czech Republic	46	(1)
- * Club domestic league appearances and goals

Tomáš Řepka (born 2 January 1974) is a Czech former professional footballer who played as a centre-back for Baník Ostrava, Sparta Prague, Fiorentina, West Ham United and České Budějovice, and the Czech national team. Currently, Řepka is playing amateur football for Sokol Červené Janovice.

== Club career ==
Řepka began his career with Baník Ostrava, where he played from 1990 to 1995. He then joined Sparta Prague, where he spent almost three years, before moving to Italian Serie A club Fiorentina. He joined Premier League club West Ham United early in Glenn Roeder's tenure as manager, for a then club record fee of £5.5 million in September 2001.

Řepka was sent off on his West Ham debut for two bookable offences, missed a match through suspension, and was sent off again in the third match he played for the club. He went on to form a central defensive partnership with Christian Dailly before the club's relegation to the second-tier Championship, although he gained a reputation for his disciplinary record, and received ten yellow cards that first season.

After relegation at the end of the 2002–03 season, the appointment of Alan Pardew as manager saw Řepka move to right-back. In the summer of 2005, after the club had regained their Premier League status, he was re-signed by Pardew on a two-year contract, albeit on reduced terms, but left the club in January 2006 to return to the Czech Republic to be with his family. He played his final match for West Ham on 23 January against Fulham.

In 2006, Řepka returned to Sparta Prague. In 2009, he won the Personality of the League award at the Czech Footballer of the Year awards.

In December 2011, Řepka left Sparta Prague following a mutually agreed early termination of his contract.

After the termination of his contract with Sparta Prague, he signed with Dynamo České Budějovice, becoming a stable member of the first team and helped his team to avoid relegation in the 2011–12 season. However, his contract was terminated by his team in November 2012.

== After career ==
After negotiations with 1. FK Příbram had broken down, he accepted a non-player role with Baník Most. After three months, Řepka quit his manager role due to disagreements with new club leaders.

In the summer of 2018, Řepka returned to football, joining Czech amateur club Panthers Čelákovice. Řepka captained the side on his debut, attracting 300 spectators for the side's 2–1 loss against Záluží. In March 2019, Řepka joined Hostivař. In August 2020, Řepka signed for Sokol Červené Janovice. In January 2021, Řepka's son, Tomasso, joined him at Červené Janovice.

== International career ==
After making his international debut for Czechoslovakia in June 1993 against the Faroe Islands, Řepka played 45 times for the Czech Republic between 1994 and 2001. He missed UEFA Euro 1996 due to a two-match suspension for a red card. However, he played for his country at Euro 2000, where the Czech Republic was eliminated in the group stage.

== Disciplinary problems ==
During his professional career, Řepka received twenty red cards (see table below). One scandal included attacking game officials and a TV cameraman in September 2007.

Team	Red cards
Baník Ostrava	2
Sparta Prague	4
Dynamo České Budějovice	1
Fiorentina	6
West Ham United	4
Czech Republic national team	2
Czech Republic national under-21 team	1

== Personal life ==
Řepka was married for 16 years to Renáta Řepková, with whom he has a daughter Veronika and a son Tomasso. In May 2012, they divorced. In December 2011, he became engaged to a model Vlaďka Erbová. Their son Markus was born on 19 May 2012. The pair married in July 2013, but divorced in 2016.

In August 2018, Řepka received a six-month jail sentence for advertising sexual services on the internet in the name of his ex-wife. The sentence was later reduced to a community order.

In February 2019, Řepka was sentenced to 15 months in jail for fraud, pending appeal, after a Prague court heard how he sold a luxury rental car which he did not own. Two weeks later, Řepka was sentenced to nine months in jail after two previous suspended sentences for driving under the influence were converted into jail terms due to his other convictions.

== Honours ==
Sparta Prague

- Czech First League: 1996–97, 1997–98, 2006–07, 2009–10
- Czech Cup: 1995–96, 2006–07, 2007–08

Fiorentina

- Coppa Italia: 2000–01

West Ham United

- Football League Championship play-offs: 2005

Czech Republic

- Kirin Cup: 1998

Individual

- Czech First League Personality of the Year 2008–09
- Was chosen as a member of All stars team Sparta Prague during the years 1980–2010 by the Fans poll
- Seventh-best Czech footballer of the decade (2000–10) by the Fans poll
- Czech First League Second-best Defender between the Years 1993–2013 by the Fans poll
