= Domenico Messina =

Italian football referee

Domenico Messina (born 12 August 1962 in Cava de' Tirreni, Salerno, Italy) is an Italian former football referee.

== Career ==
Messina began to referee in the Italian Serie A in 1995; his first match was played between Genoa and Padova, on 15 January. He went on to referee almost 200 matches in Serie A (192 in total).

In 1998, Messina was granted the right to referee international matches, and he joined UEFA's elite panel of referees in 2001, before he was replaced on the panel by fellow Italian Stefano Farina in 2005. He made his refereeing debut in the UEFA Champions League in 2001, refereeing a match between Paris Saint-Germain and Bayern Munich. Messina has also refereed two Coppa Italia finals; first in the first leg of the 1999 edition of the final between Parma and Fiorentina, and then the second leg of the 2006 final between Internazionale and Roma.

At international level, Messina served as a FIFA referee in qualifiers for the 2002 and 2006 World Cups, as well as preliminary matches for Euro 2000, Euro 2004, and Euro 2008.

In the summer of 2006, Messina was involved in the Calciopoli scandal, giving evidence on behalf of the Italian Football Federation. He was later acquitted. In July 2007, Messina announced his intention to retire from professional refereeing at the end of the 2006–07 season, as he had almost reached the age of 45, the FIFA-specified age at which referees must retire from top-level refereeing.

== Honours ==
- Premio Giovanni Mauro: 2000–01
