= Sandro Cois =

Italian footballer

Personal information
- Date of birth: 9 June 1972 (age 54)
- Place of birth: Fossano, Italy
- Height: 1.78 m (5 ft 10 in)
- Position: Defensive midfielder

Youth career
- Torino

Senior career*
Years	Team	Apps	(Gls)
1988–1994	Torino	44	(2)
1988–1989	→ Saviglianese (loan)	18	(0)
1994–2002	Fiorentina	175	(7)
2002–2003	Sampdoria	4	(0)
2003	→ Piacenza (loan)	5	(0)
Total		246	(9)

International career
1998–1999	Italy	3	(0)
- * Club domestic league appearances and goals

Sandro Cois (Italian pronunciation: [ˈsandro ˈkɔis]; born 9 June 1972) is an Italian former professional footballer. He enjoyed a lengthy career, playing primarily as a defensive midfielder for Italian clubs Torino, Saviglianese, Fiorentina, Sampdoria, and Piacenza. Due to his tactical intelligence, passing, stamina, tenacity, and versatility, he was capable of playing in several midfield and defensive positions. At international level, he represented Italy on three occasions between 1998 and 1999, and was member of the team that took part at the 1998 FIFA World Cup.

== Club career ==
Cois was born in Fossano. He played for several clubs throughout his career, including Torino (1988–1994), Sampdoria (2002–03) and Piacenza (2003). He achieved notable success with Torino early in his career, after achieving Serie A promotion by winning the 1989–90 Serie B title with the club. He later won the Mitropa Cup in 1991, the Coppa Italia in 1993, and he helped his team to the 1991–92 UEFA Cup final, after helping his team to qualify for the tournament by leading them to a third place in Serie A in 1991. In the 1992 UEFA Cup Final, they were defeated by Ajax on aggregate.

Cois is perhaps best known for his spell at Fiorentina (1994–2002) in the mid-late 90s where he won over the fans with his tireless running and tenacious play, becoming important to the side as the less glamorous foil to playmakers like Rui Costa and Domenico Morfeo. With the club he won two Coppa Italia trophies in 1996 and 2001, and a Supercoppa Italiana in 1996, also helping Fiorentina to two third-place finishes in Serie A in 1996 and 1999.

== International career ==
It was during his period with Fiorentina in the late 90s that Cois broke into the Italy national football team. He was a participant at the 1998 FIFA World Cup, although he never became a regular in the side, winning just 3 caps between 1998 and 1999, one of which was in an unofficial match against the FIFA World Stars, also failing to make an appearance at the 1998 World Cup.

== Honours ==
=== Player ===
==== Club ====
Torino

- Coppa Italia: 1992–93
- Supercoppa Italiana: Runner-up 1994
- Serie B: 1989–90
- UEFA Cup: Runner-up 1991–92
- Mitropa Cup: 1991
- Memorial Pier Cesare Baretti: 1990, Runner-up 1993

Fiorentina

- Coppa Italia: 1995–96, 2000–01
- Supercoppa Italiana: 1996; Runner-up 2001
