= 2000–01 AC Milan season =

Milan
2000–01 season
- President: Silvio Berlusconi
- Manager: Alberto Zaccheroni (until 14 March 2001); Cesare Maldini
- Stadium: San Siro
- Serie A: 6th (in 2001-02 UEFA Cup)
- Coppa Italia: Semi-finals
- UEFA Champions League: Second group stage
- Top goalscorer: League: Andriy Shevchenko (24); All: Andriy Shevchenko (34)
- Average home league attendance: 52,304
Home colours	Away colours	Third colours

Associazione Calcio Milan had a poor season in 2000–01, finishing 6th in Serie A with 49 points, and only the scoring touch of Ukrainian striker Andriy Shevchenko (24 goals in the league and 34 in all competitions) saved them from complete humiliation.

In the Champions League, Milan started brightly, topping their group after some convincing performances, including a 0–2 win at the Camp Nou against Barcelona; however, they were eventually eliminated in the second group stage when they only managed a draw (while needing a win) in the group's last match against Spanish champions Deportivo La Coruña. With the 2001 Champions League final due to take place at the San Siro, the disappointment was immense, and resulted in the sacking of their 1998–99 title-winning coach Alberto Zaccheroni on 14 March 2001, one day after the draw with Deportivo, with Silvio Berlusconi appointing Milan legend Cesare Maldini as caretaker manager until the end of the season.

Cesare Maldini's brief caretaker tenure included a memorable 0–6 thumping of cross-city rivals Inter, and this victory would be the high point of the 2000–01 season for Milan.

== Players ==
=== Squad information ===
Note: Flags indicate national team as defined under FIFA eligibility rules; some limited exceptions apply. Players may hold more than one non-FIFA nationality.

No.	Pos.	Nation	Player
1	GK	ITA	Sebastiano Rossi
2	DF	DEN	Thomas Helveg
3	DF	ITA	Paolo Maldini (Captain)
4	MF	ITA	Demetrio Albertini
5	DF	ITA	Alessandro Costacurta
7	FW	UKR	Andriy Shevchenko
8	MF	ITA	Gennaro Gattuso
9	FW	ITA	Gianni Comandini
10	MF	CRO	Zvonimir Boban
11	FW	ESP	José Mari
12	GK	ITA	Christian Abbiati
13	DF	GEO	Kakha Kaladze
16	MF	ARG	Fernando Redondo
18	MF	BRA	Leonardo
19	DF	ARG	José Chamot
20	FW	GER	Oliver Bierhoff

No.	Pos.	Nation	Player
21	MF	ITA	Federico Giunti
23	MF	ITA	Massimo Ambrosini
24	MF	ARG	Guly
25	DF	BRA	Roque Júnior
26	DF	ITA	Luigi Sala
27	DF	BRA	Serginho
29	MF	ITA	Marco Donadel
31	MF	ITA	Lorenzo Rossetti
32	GK	BRA	Dida
33	MF	FRA	Ibrahim Ba
36	DF	ITA	Michele Ferri
40	GK	ITA	Valerio Fiori
55	MF	URU	Pablo García
77	DF	ITA	Francesco Coco
79	DF	ITA	Daniele Daino

=== Transfers ===
In
Pos.	Name	from	Type
MF	Fernando Redondo	Real Madrid	(U$30,0 million )
DF	Júlio César	Real Madrid	
DF	Roque Júnior	Palmeiras	
MF	Dražen Brnčić	A.C. Monza	-
FW	Gianni Comandini	Vicenza Calcio	
GK	Dida	SC Corinthians	loan ended
DF	Samir Beloufa	A.C. Monza	loan ended
DF	Francesco Coco	Torino	loan ended
DF	Daniele Daino	Perugia Calcio	loan ended
DF	Bruno N'Gotty	Venezia F.C.	loan ended
DF	Mirco Sadotti	U.S. Lecce	loan ended
DF	Max Tonetto	Bologna F.C.	loan ended
MF	Ibrahim Ba	Perugia Calcio	loan ended
MF	Pierluigi Orlandini	Venezia F.C.	loan ended
FW	Maurizio Ganz	Venezia F.C.	loan ended
FW	Alessandro Iannuzzi	Reggina Calcio	loan ended
FW	Luca Saudati	Empoli F.C.	loan ended
FW	George Weah	Chelsea F.C.	loan ended

Out
Pos.	Name	To	Type
FW	George Weah		released
FW	Maurizio Ganz	Atalanta BC	
DF	Bruno N'Gotty	Marseille	
DF	Carlo Teodorani	Ternana	
MF	Diego De Ascentis	Torino	
MF	Pierluigi Orlandini	Brescia Calcio	
GK	Roberto Colombo	Calcio Padova	
DF	Max Tonetto	US Lecce	co-ownership
DF	Mirco Sadotti	Pescara	co-ownership
GK	Giorgio Frezzolini	Inter Milan	co-ownership released
FW	Luca Saudati	Perugia Calcio	co-ownership
GK	Gabriele Aldegani	AC Monza	loan
DF	Taribo West	Derby County	loan
DF	Samir Beloufa	Germinal Beerschot	loan
FW	Mattia Graffiedi	Ternana	loan
FW	Alessandro Iannuzzi	AC Monza	loan
FW	Mohammed Aliyu Datti	AC Monza	loan

==== Winter ====
In
Pos.	Name	from	Type
DF	Kakha Kaladze	Dinamo Kyiv	
MF	Pablo García	Atlético Madrid	

Out
Pos.	Name	To	Type
DF	Roberto Ayala	Valencia CF	
GK	Gabriele Aldegani	Treviso	loan ended
DF	Júlio César	Real Sociedad	
DF	Fabricio Coloccini	San Lorenzo	loan
MF	Dražen Brnčić	Vicenza Calcio	loan

== Competitions ==
=== Serie A ===
==== League table ====
Pos	Team	Pld	W	D	L	GF	GA	GD	Pts	Qualification or relegation
4	Parma	34	16	8	10	51	31	+20	56	Qualification to Champions League third qualifying round
5	Internazionale	34	14	9	11	47	47	0	51	Qualification to UEFA Cup first round
6	Milan	34	12	13	9	56	46	+10	49	Qualification to UEFA Cup first round
7	Atalanta	34	10	14	10	38	34	+4	44 (Note: Atalanta finished ahead of Brescia on head-to-head points: Atalanta 2–0 Brescia, Brescia 0–3 Atalanta.)	
8	Brescia (Note: Brescia gained entry to the 2001 UEFA Intertoto Cup after Atalanta declined.)	34	10	14	10	44	42	+2	44	Qualification to Intertoto Cup third round

Source: 2000–01 Serie A, Soccerway, RSSSF.com
Rules for classification: 1) Points; 2) Head-to-head points; 3) Head-to-head goal difference; 4) Goal difference; 5) Goals scored; 6) Draw. (Note: Head-to-head record is used only after all the matches between the teams in question have been played).

==== Results summary ====
Overall								Home						Away					
Pld	W	D	L	GF	GA	GD	Pts	W	D	L	GF	GA	GD	W	D	L	GF	GA	GD
34	12	13	9	56	46	+10	49	9	6	2	35	20	+15	3	7	7	21	26	−5

Source: Competitive matches

==== Results by round ====
Round	1	2	3	4	5	6	7	8	9	10	11	12	13	14	15	16	17	18	19	20	21	22	23	24	25	26	27	28	29	30	31	32	33	34
Ground	H	A	H	A	H	A	A	H	A	H	A	H	H	A	H	A	H	A	H	A	H	A	H	H	A	H	A	H	A	A	H	A	H	A
Result	W	L	D	L	D	W	D	W	W	W	D	L	D	L	W	D	W	L	D	L	D	D	W	W	D	W	D	W	L	W	L	D	D	L
Position	1	7	8	12	13	8	11	7	7	4	4	6	6	6	5	6	5	5	6	6	6	8	7	7	7	5	5	5	5	5	5	5	5	6

Source: Competitive matches
A = Away; H = Home; W = Win; D = Draw; L = Loss; P = Postponed; = Leader, 2001–02 UEFA Champions League Group stage; = 2001–02 UEFA Champions League Group stage; = 2001–02 UEFA Champions League Qualifying round; = 2001–02 UEFA Cup First round; = Qualification to Intertoto Cup; = 2001–02 Serie B

==== Matches ====
1 October 2000 1	Milan	2–0	Vicenza	Milan
15:00 CEST	Bierhoff 16'; Shevchenko 84'	Report		Stadium: San Siro; Attendance: 46 036

15 October 2000 2	Bologna	2–1	Milan
15:00 CEST	Bia 19'; Piacentini 90'	Report	Shevchenko 66'	Attendance: 34 641

21 October 2000 3	Milan	2–2	Juventus	Milan
20:30 CEST	Ambrosini 59'; Shevchenko 61'	Report	Trezeguet 67'; Conte 90'	Stadium: San Siro; Attendance: 81 706

1 November 2000 4	Parma	2–0	Milan	Parma
20:30 CEST	Mboma 5', 66'	Report		Stadium: Il Tardini; Attendance: 21 572

5 November 2000 5	Milan	3–3	Atalanta	Milan
15:00 CET	Serginho 23'; Bierhoff 49'; Shevchenko 64' (pen.)	Report	Doni 21', 44' (pen.); Rossini 45'	Stadium: San Siro; Attendance: 54 641

12 November 2000 6	Bari	1–3	Milan	Bari
15:00 CET	Madsen 71'	Report	Bierhoff 67'; Shevchenko 74' (pen.), 86'	Stadium: San Nicola; Attendance: 27 353

18 November 2000 7	Lazio	1–1	Milan	Rome
20:30 CET	D. Baggio 3'	Report	54' Shevchenko	Stadium: Olimpico; Attendance: 57 562

25 November 2000 8	Milan	1–0	Napoli	Milan
20:30 CET	Ambrosini 43'	Report		Stadium: San Siro; Attendance: 49 346

3 December 2000 9	Udinese	0–1	Milan
15:00 CET		Report	Shevchenko 51'	Attendance: 27 379

10 December 2000 10	Milan	4–1	Lecce	Milan
15:00 CET	Leonardo 20'; Shevchenko 27', 30' (pen.); José Mari 87'	Report	Conticchio 22'	Stadium: San Siro; Attendance: 46 581

17 December 2000 11	Hellas Verona	1–1	Milan
15:00 CET	Bonazzoli 4'	Report	Ambrosini 22'	Attendance: 23 658

23 December 2000 12	Milan	1–2	Perugia	Milan
15:00 CET	Shevchenko 24'	Report	Saudati 21'; Vryzas 58'	Stadium: San Siro; Attendance: 44 325

7 January 2001 13	Milan	2–2	Internazionale	Milan
20:30 CET	Boban 65'; Bierhoff 84'	Report	Şükür 11'; Di Biagio 72'	Stadium: San Siro; Attendance: 80 287

13 January 2001 14	Fiorentina	4–0	Milan
20:30 CET	Nuno Gomes 15'; Cois 47'; Chiesa 72'; Rui Costa 87'	Report		Attendance: 39 231

21 January 2001 15	Milan	3–2	Roma	Milan
20:30 CET	Leonardo 3'; Shevchenko 21', 44'	Report	Totti 40', 86' (pen.)	Stadium: San Siro; Attendance: 61 820

28 January 2001 16	Brescia	1–1	Milan
15:00 CET	Hübner 47'	Report	Bierhoff 26'	Attendance: 31 619

4 February 2001 17	Milan	1–0	Reggina	Milan
15:00 CET	Leonardo 79'	Report		Stadium: San Siro; Attendance: 47 348

11 February 2001 18	Vicenza	2–0	Milan
15:00 CET	Dabo 7'; Toni 72'	Report		Attendance: 17 151

17 February 2001 19	Milan	3–3	Bologna	Milan
20:30 CET	Shevchenko 23', 32'; Sala 90'	Report	Cipriani 55', 73'; Signori 81'	Stadium: San Siro; Attendance: 48 140

25 February 2001 20	Juventus	3–0	Milan
20:30 CET	Tudor 9'; Trezeguet 67'; Zidane 90'	Report		Attendance: 48 140

4 March 2001 21	Milan	2–2	Parma	Milan
15:00 CET	Maldini 22'; Guly 50'	Report	Milošević 24'; Amoroso 80'	Stadium: San Siro; Attendance: 45 269

10 March 2001 22	Atalanta	1–1	Milan
20:30 CET	Ganz 63'	Report	Lorenzi 24' (o.g.)	Attendance: 21 311

18 March 2001 23	Milan	4–0	Bari	Milan
15:00 CET	Coco 8'; Shevchenko 45' (pen.), 90'; Serginho 75'	Report		Stadium: San Siro; Attendance: 49 781

1 April 2001 24	Milan	1–0	Lazio	Milan
20:30 CEST	Boban 59'	Report		Stadium: San Siro; Attendance: 52 010

8 April 2001 25	Napoli	0–0	Milan	Naples
15:00 CEST		Report		Stadium: San Paolo; Attendance: 39 400

14 April 2001 26	Milan	3–0	Udinese	Milan
15:00 CEST	Kaladze 9'; Serginho 31'; Shevchenko 71'	Report		Stadium: San Siro; Attendance: 45 922

22 April 2001 27	Lecce	3–3	Milan	Lecce
15:00 CEST	Lucarelli 35' (pen.); Vugrinec 46'; Savino 67'	Report	Bierhoff 37'; Shevchenko 41'; Kaladze 90'	Stadium: Via del Mare; Attendance: 20 600; Referee: Borriello

29 April 2001 28	Milan	1–0	Hellas Verona	Milan
15:00 CEST	Shevchenko 69' (pen.)	Report		Stadium: San Siro; Attendance: 44 665; Referee: Paparesta

6 May 2001 29	Perugia	2–1	Milan	Perugia
15:00 CEST	Vryzas 5', 50'	Report	Shevchenko 31' (pen.)	Stadium: Renato Curi; Attendance: 12 781

11 May 2001 30	Internazionale	0–6	Milan	Milan
20:30 CEST		Report	Comandini 3', 19'; Giunti 51'; Shevchenko 57', 68'; Serginho 81'	Stadium: Giuseppe Meazza; Attendance: 78 054; Referee: Collina

17 May 2001 31	Milan	1–2	Fiorentina	Milan
20:30 CEST	Shevchenko 29'	Report	Chiesa 11', 18'	Stadium: San Siro; Attendance: 44 699; Referee: Rodomonti

27 May 2001 32	Roma	1–1	Milan	Rome
20:30 CEST	Montella 64'	Report	Coco 45'	Stadium: Olimpico; Attendance: 71 407; Referee: Cesari

10 June 2001 33	Milan	1–1	Brescia	Milan
15:00 CEST	José Mari 68'	Report	Bachini 70'	Stadium: San Siro; Attendance: 56 754; Referee: Rosetti

17 June 2001 34	Reggina	2–1	Milan
15:00 CEST	Morabito 77'; Paulo Costa 82'	Report	Kaladze 69'	Attendance: 25 912

=== Coppa Italia ===
==== Eightfinals ====
16 September 2000 1	Torino	1–3	Milan	Turin
	Pinga 74'	Report	Guglielminpietro 42', 89'; Bierhoff 60'	Stadium: Delle Alpi; Attendance: 9,878; Referee: Gennaro Borriello

23 September 2000 2	Milan	0–1 (3–2 agg.)	Torino	Milan
		Report	Schwoch 14' (pen.)	Stadium: Stadio Giuseppe Meazza; Attendance: 3,339; Referee: Massimiliano Saccani

==== Quarterfinals ====
28 November 2000 1	Milan	4–2	Atalanta	Milan
	Leonardo 30', 65'; José Mari 54' (pen.); Shevchenko 88'	Report	Ganz 20'; Nappi 47' (pen.)	Stadium: San Siro; Attendance: 6,112; Referee: Stefano Farina

13 December 2000 2	Atalanta	2–1 (4–5 agg.)	Milan	Bergamo
	Nappi 14'; Doni 90'	Report	Boban 20'	Stadium: Atleti Azzurri d'Italia; Attendance: 12,000; Referee: Gianluca Paparesta

==== Semifinals ====
25 January 2001 1	Milan	2–2	Fiorentina	Milan
21:00 CET	Ambrosini 66'; Giunti 90+2'		17' Chiesa; 75' Bressan	Stadium: San Siro; Attendance: 7,000; Referee: Gennaro Borriello

7 February 2001 2	Fiorentina	2–0 (4–2 agg.)	Milan	Florence
21:00 CET	Chiesa 42'; Rui Costa 82'			Stadium: Artemio Franchi; Attendance: 25,000; Referee: Emilio Pellegrino

=== UEFA Champions League ===
==== Third qualifying round ====
9 August 2000 First leg	Milan (Italy)	3–1	(Croatia) Dinamo Zagreb	Milan
20:5 CEST (UTC+02:00)	Shevchenko 21', 59'; Comandini 90'	Report	Pilipović 19'	Stadium: San Siro; Attendance: 37,323; Referee: (Luxembourg) Alain Hamer

22 August 2000 Second leg	Dinamo Zagreb (Croatia)	0–3 (1–6 agg.)	(Italy) Milan	Zagreb
20:30 CEST (UTC+02:00)		Report	Shevchenko 23', 42'; José Mari 55'	Stadium: Stadion Maksimir; Attendance: 26,500; Referee: (Spain) Juan Ansuátegui Roca

==== Group stage ====
Pos	Team	Pld	W	D	L	GF	GA	GD	Pts	Qualification	MIL	LEE	BAR	BES
1	(Italy) Milan	6	3	2	1	12	6	+6	11	Advance to second group stage	—	1–1	3–3	4–1
2	(England) Leeds United	6	2	3	1	9	6	+3	9	Advance to second group stage	1–0	—	1–1	6–0
3	(Spain) Barcelona	6	2	2	2	13	9	+4	8	Transfer to UEFA Cup	0–2	4–0	—	5–0
4	(Turkey) Beşiktaş	6	1	1	4	4	17	−13	4		0–2	0–0	3–0	—

Source: UEFA

13 September 2000 1	Milan (Italy)	4–1	(Turkey) Beşiktaş	Milan
20:45	Coco 36'; Bierhoff 44'; Shevchenko 45+2' (pen.), 77'	Report	Tayfur 20' (pen.)	Stadium: San Siro; Attendance: 53,436; Referee: (Poland) Ryszard Wójcik

19 September 2000 2	Leeds United (England)	1–0	(Italy) Milan	Leeds
20:45	Bowyer 89'	Report		Stadium: Elland Road; Attendance: 35,398; Referee: (Austria) Günter Benkö

26 September 2000 3	Barcelona (Spain)	0–2	(Italy) Milan	Barcelona
20:45		Report	Coco 45+1'; Bierhoff 71'	Stadium: Camp Nou; Attendance: 98,000; Referee: (Germany) Hellmut Krug

18 October 2000 4	Milan (Italy)	3–3	(Spain) Barcelona	Milan
20:45	Albertini 26', 39'; José Mari 45'	Report	Rivaldo 19', 43', 68'	Stadium: San Siro; Attendance: 79,945; Referee: (Scotland) Hugh Dallas

24 October 2000 5	Beşiktaş (Turkey)	0–2	(Italy) Milan	Istanbul
20:45		Report	Shevchenko 38'; José Mari 43'	Stadium: BJK İnönü Stadium; Attendance: 30,000; Referee: (Germany) Hartmut Strampe

8 November 2000 6	Milan (Italy)	1–1	(England) Leeds United	Milan
20:45	Serginho 68'	Report	Matteo 45'	Stadium: San Siro; Attendance: 52,289; Referee: (Denmark) Kim Milton Nielsen

==== Second group stage ====
Pos	Team	Pld	W	D	L	GF	GA	GD	Pts	Qualification	DEP	GAL	MIL	PAR
1	(Spain) Deportivo La Coruña	6	3	1	2	10	7	+3	10	Advance to knockout stage	—	2–0	0–1	4–3
2	(Turkey) Galatasaray	6	3	1	2	6	6	0	10	Advance to knockout stage	1–0	—	2–0	1–0
3	(Italy) Milan	6	1	4	1	6	7	−1	7		1–1	2–2	—	1–1
4	(France) Paris Saint-Germain	6	1	2	3	8	10	−2	5		1–3	2–0	1–1	—

Source: UEFA

21 November 2000	Milan (Italy)	2–2	(Turkey) Galatasaray	Milan
20:45	José Mari 47'; Shevchenko 73' (pen.)	Report	Jardel 39'; Hasan Şaş 41'	Stadium: San Siro; Attendance: 46,325; Referee: (Switzerland) Urs Meier

6 December 2000	Deportivo La Coruña (Spain)	0–1	(Italy) Milan	A Coruña
20:45		Report	Helveg 45+1'	Stadium: Estadio Riazor; Attendance: 34,775; Referee: (England) Graham Poll

14 February 2001	Milan (Italy)	1–1	(France) Paris Saint-Germain	Milan
20:45	Leonardo 27'	Report	Anelka 30'	Stadium: San Siro; Attendance: 50,050; Referee: (Sweden) Anders Frisk

20 February 2001	Paris Saint-Germain (France)	1–1	(Italy) Milan	Paris
20:45	Robert 75'	Report	José Mari 90+1'	Stadium: Parc des Princes; Attendance: 41,450; Referee: (Netherlands) Jan Wegereef

7 March 2001	Galatasaray (Turkey)	2–0	(Italy) Milan	Istanbul
20:45	Hagi 20'; Jardel 86'	Report		Stadium: Ali Sami Yen Stadium; Attendance: 20,000; Referee: (Germany) Hellmut Krug

13 March 2001	Milan (Italy)	1–1	(Spain) Deportivo La Coruña	Milan
20:45	Shevchenko 86' (pen.)	Report	Djalminha 74' (pen.)	Stadium: San Siro; Attendance: 70,103; Referee: (Scotland) Hugh Dallas

== Statistics ==
=== Players statistics ===
No.	Pos	Nat	Player	Total		Serie A		Champions League		Coppa Italia	
No.	Pos	Nat	Player	Apps	Goals	Apps	Goals	Apps	Goals	Apps	Goals
12	GK	(Italy) ITA	Abbiati	32	-47	20+1	-31	7	-8	4	-8
2	DF	(Denmark) DEN	Helveg	42	1	24+4	0	7+2	1	5	0
25	DF	(Brazil) BRA	Roque Júnior	35	0	22	0	7+1	0	5	0
3	DF	(Italy) ITA	Maldini	49	1	31	1	14	0	4	0
13	DF	(Georgia (country)) GEO	Kaladze	17	3	17	3				
21	MF	(Italy) ITA	Giunti	37	2	17+7	1	6+1	0	6	1
23	MF	(Italy) ITA	Ambrosini	26	4	16	3	6+1	0	3	1
8	MF	(Italy) ITA	Gattuso	34	0	19+5	0	10	0		
77	MF	(Italy) ITA	Coco	44	4	28+2	2	10+1	2	3	0
20	FW	(Germany) GER	Bierhoff	42	9	21+6	6	8+2	2	5	1
7	FW	(Ukraine) UKR	Shevchenko	51	34	33+1	24	14	9	3	1
1	GK	(Italy) ITA	Rossi	15	-14	13+1	-13	1	-1		
5	DF	(Italy) ITA	Costacurta	29	0	17+1	0	9	0	2	0
27	DF	(Brazil) BRA	Serginho	37	5	16+5	4	5+6	1	5	0
18	MF	(Brazil) BRA	Leonardo	32	6	14+8	3	5	1	5	2
19	DF	(Argentina) ARG	Chamot	25	0	12+2	0	8+1	0	2	0
4	MF	(Italy) ITA	Albertini	26	2	11+2	0	11	2	2	0
11	FW	(Spain) ESP	José Mari	34	8	10+11	2	7+2	5	4	1
26	DF	(Italy) ITA	Sala	17	1	7+6	1	3+1	0		
9	FW	(Italy) ITA	Comandini	17	3	7+6	2	1+3	1		
10	MF	(Croatia) CRO	Boban	26	3	6+10	2	3+4	0	3	1
24	MF	(Argentina) ARG	Guly	22	3	5+8	1	2+4	0	3	2
55	MF	(Uruguay) URU	Pablo García	6	0	3+2	0	1	0		
33	MF	(France) FRA	Ba	11	0	2+3	0	2+2	0	2	0
	DF	(Brazil) BRA	Julio Cesar	4	0	2+2	0				
32	GK	(Brazil) BRA	Dida	7	-7	1	-2	6	-5		
	MF	(Croatia) CRO	Brncic	5	0	0+1	0	0+1	0	3	0
79	DF	(Italy) ITA	Daino	1	0	0+1	0				
29	MF	(Italy) ITA	Donadel	1	0	0+1	0				
41	FW	(Italy) ITA	Saudati	2	0	0	0	1+1	0		
16	MF	(Argentina) ARG	Redondo								
40	GK	(Italy) ITA	Fiori								
36	DF	(Italy) ITA	Ferri								

- Source: http://calcio-seriea.net/presenze/2000/1182/
