= 1999–2000 AC Milan season =

Milan
1999–2000 season
- President: Silvio Berlusconi
- Manager: Alberto Zaccheroni
- Stadium: San Siro
- Serie A: 3rd
- Supercoppa Italiana: Runners-up
- Coppa Italia: Quarter-finals
- UEFA Champions League: Group stage
- Top goalscorer: League: Andriy Shevchenko (24); All: Andriy Shevchenko (29)
- Average home league attendance: 58,522
Home colours	Away colours	Third colours

Associazione Calcio Milan did not manage to repeat their successful previous season (1998–99). They failed to defend the Serie A title, finishing in 3rd place behind champions Lazio and runners-up Juventus, and crashed out of the Champions League following a lackluster performance in the First Group Phase. In fact, Milan ended up last in the group, and did not even qualify for the remainder of the UEFA Cup.

New signing Andriy Shevchenko played his first season with the Milanese club, and managed to become the Serie A's top scorer in his debut season in Italy, with 24 goals (29 in all competitions), further enhancing his reputation as a fearsome striker. Other signings proven to be successful were Serginho and Gennaro Gattuso, who would stay at the club for years to come and be eventually introduced into the club's hall of fame.

== Players ==
Note: Flags indicate national team as defined under FIFA eligibility rules; some limited exceptions apply. Players may hold more than one non-FIFA nationality.

No.	Pos.	Nation	Player
1	GK	ITA	Sebastiano Rossi
2	MF	DEN	Thomas Helveg
3	DF	ITA	Paolo Maldini
4	MF	ITA	Demetrio Albertini
5	DF	ITA	Alessandro Costacurta
7	FW	UKR	Andriy Shevchenko
8	MF	ITA	Gennaro Gattuso
9	FW	LBR	George Weah
10	MF	CRO	Zvonimir Boban
11	FW	ITA	Maurizio Ganz
12	GK	ITA	Christian Abbiati
13	DF	NGR	Taribo West
13	MF	SEN	Ibrahim Ba
14	DF	ARG	Roberto Ayala
15	MF	ITA	Diego De Ascentis
16	MF	ITA	Max Tonetto
18	MF	BRA	Leonardo

No.	Pos.	Nation	Player
19	MF	ITA	Pierluigi Orlandini
19	DF	ARG	José Chamot
20	FW	GER	Oliver Bierhoff
21	MF	ITA	Federico Giunti
22	GK	ITA	Roberto Colombo
23	MF	ITA	Massimo Ambrosini
24	MF	ARG	Andres Guly
25	DF	FRA	Bruno N'Gotty
26	DF	ITA	Luigi Sala
27	MF	BRA	Serginho
28	DF	ITA	Mirco Sadotti
29	DF	ITA	Carlo Teodorani
30	FW	ITA	Mattia Graffiedi
33	FW	NGR	Mohammed Aliyu Datti
38	DF	ARG	Fabricio Coloccini
40	GK	ITA	Valerio Fiori
41	FW	ESP	José Mari

=== Transfers ===
In
Pos.	Name	from	Type
FW	Andriy Shevchenko	Dinamo Kyiv	-
MF	Gennaro Gattuso	U.S. Salernitana	-
MF	Serginho	Sao Paulo FC	-
GK	Valerio Fiori	Piacenza Calcio	-
DF	Mirco Sadotti	U.S. Lecce	-
DF	Max Tonetto	Empoli FC	-
DF	Carlo Teodorani	AC Cesena	-
MF	Diego De Ascentis	AS Bari	-
MF	Pierluigi Orlandini	Parma FC	-
FW	Mattia Graffiedi	AC Cesena	-
GK	Dida	FC Lugano	loan ended
DF	André Cruz	Standard Liege	loan ended
DF	Daniele Daino	S.S.C. Napoli	loan ended
GK	Gabriele Aldegani	A.C. Monza	loan ended
FW	Luca Saudati	Como 1907	loan ended

Out
Pos.	Name	To	Type
MF	Roberto Donadoni		retired
DF	André Cruz	Torino	
GK	Massimo Taibi	Venezia FC	
MF	Christian Ziege	Middlesbrough	
MF	Ibrahim Ba	Perugia Calcio	loan
DF	Samir Beloufa	A.C. Monza	loan
DF	Francesco Coco	Torino	loan
GK	Gabriele Aldegani	Treviso FBC 1993	loan
GK	Dida	SC Corinthians	loan
GK	Giorgio Frezzolini	Inter	co-ownership
DF	Daniele Daino	Perugia Calcio	loan
DF	Steinar Nilsen	S.S.C. Napoli	co-ownership
DF	Carlo Teodorani	Ternana Calcio	loan
MF	Domenico Morfeo	Fiorentina	loan ended
FW	Alessandro Ianuzzi	Reggina	loan
FW	Luca Saudati	Empoli FC	loan

==== Winter ====
In
Pos.	Name	from	Type
DF	José Chamot	Atlético Madrid	-
DF	Fabricio Coloccini	Boca Juniors	-
DF	Taribo West	Inter	-
FW	José Mari	Atlético Madrid	-

Out
Pos.	Name	To	Type
GK	Roberto Colombo	Calcio Padova	loan
DF	Bruno N'Gotty	Venezia FC	loan
DF	Mirco Sadotti	U.S. Lecce	loan
DF	Max Tonetto	Bologna FC	loan
MF	Pierluigi Orlandini	Venezia FC	loan
FW	Maurizio Ganz	Venezia FC	loan
FW	George Weah	Chelsea	loan

=== Reserves ===
Note: Flags indicate national team as defined under FIFA eligibility rules; some limited exceptions apply. Players may hold more than one non-FIFA nationality.

No.	Pos.	Nation	Player
30	FW	ITA	Mattia Graffiedi
31	MF	ITA	Lorenzo Rossetti
32	FW	ITA	Andrea Rabito
35	MF	ITA	Simonluca Agazzone
36	DF	ITA	Michele Ferri

=== Kits ===
Home	Away	Third	Third Alt.	Centennial

== Competitions ==
=== Supercoppa Italiana ===
21 August 1999	Milan	1–2	Parma	Milan
	Guly 54'	Report	Crespo 66'; Boghossian 92'	Stadium: San Siro; Attendance: 25,001; Referee: Gennaro Borriello

=== Serie A ===
==== League table ====
Pos	Team	Pld	W	D	L	GF	GA	GD	Pts	Qualification or relegation
1	Lazio (C)	34	21	9	4	64	33	+31	72	Qualification to Champions League first group stage
2	Juventus	34	21	8	5	46	20	+26	71	Qualification to Champions League first group stage
3	Milan	34	16	13	5	65	40	+25	61	Qualification to Champions League third qualifying round
4	Internazionale (Note: Internazionale entered the 2000–01 UEFA Champions League after winning the UEFA Champions League qualification match against Parma.)	34	17	7	10	58	36	+22	58	Qualification to Champions League third qualifying round
5	Parma	34	16	10	8	52	37	+15	58	Qualification to UEFA Cup first round

Source: Serie A, RSSSF.com, Soccerway
Rules for classification: 1) Points; 2) Head-to-head points; 3) Head-to-head goal difference; 4) Goal difference; 5) Goals scored; 6) Draw. (Note: Head-to-head record is used only after all the matches between the teams in question have been played).
(C) Champions

==== Results summary ====
Overall								Home						Away					
Pld	W	D	L	GF	GA	GD	Pts	W	D	L	GF	GA	GD	W	D	L	GF	GA	GD
34	16	13	5	65	40	+25	61	10	6	1	40	18	+22	6	7	4	25	22	+3

Source: Competitive matches

==== Results by round ====
Round	1	2	3	4	5	6	7	8	9	10	11	12	13	14	15	16	17	18	19	20	21	22	23	24	25	26	27	28	29	30	31	32	33	34
Ground	A	H	A	H	A	H	A	A	H	A	H	A	H	H	A	H	A	H	A	H	A	H	A	H	H	A	H	A	H	A	A	H	A	H
Result	D	W	D	W	D	D	W	D	W	L	W	L	W	D	W	D	W	D	W	W	W	W	D	L	D	L	W	L	D	D	W	W	D	W
Position	4	1	5	3	5	5	3	3	3	5	4	6	5	5	5	5	5	4	3	3	3	2	3	4	4	4	3	3	3	4	3	3	3	3

Source: http://calcio-seriea.net/allenatori_squadra/1999/1171/
A = Away; H = Home; W = Win; D = Draw; L = Loss; P = Postponed; = Leader, 2000–01 UEFA Champions League Group stage; = 2000–01 UEFA Champions League Group stage; = 2000–01 UEFA Champions League Qualifying round; = 2000–01 UEFA Cup First round; = Qualification to Intertoto Cup; = 2000–01 Serie B

==== Matches ====
29 August 1999 1	Lecce	2–2	Milan	Lecce
15:00 CEST	Savino 65'; Lucarelli 80'	Report	Weah 55'; Shevchenko 73'	Stadium: Via del Mare; Attendance: 32 080; Referee: Trentalange

12 September 1999 2	Milan	3–1	Perugia	Milan
15:00 CEST	Bierhoff 28'; Shevchenko 59'; Leonardo 71'	Report	Materazzi 40'	Stadium: San Siro; Attendance: 52 834; Referee: Bazzoli

18 September 1999 3	Bari	1–1	Milan	Bari
20:30 CEST	Osmanovski 12'	Report	Serginho 34'	Stadium: San Nicola; Attendance: 52 541; Referee: Borriello

25 September 1999 4	Milan	4–0	Bologna	Milan
20:30 CEST	Weah 9'; Leonardo 44'; Bierhoff 55' (pen.); Ganz 63'	Report		Stadium: San Siro; Attendance: 52 541; Referee: Borriello

3 October 1999 5	Lazio	4–4	Milan	Rome
20:30 CEST	Verón 18'; Simeone 36'; Salas 38', 72'	Report	Mihajlović 35' (o.g.); Shevchenko 43', 63' (pen.), 69'	Stadium: Olimpico; Attendance: 56 135; Referee: Bazzoli

17 October 1999 6	Milan	2–2	Cagliari	Milan
15:00 CEST	Shevchenko 11' (pen.); Bierhoff 83'	Report	Morfeo 8'; Berretta 39'	Stadium: San Siro; Attendance: 54 949; Referee: De Santis

23 October 1999 7	Inter Milan	1–2	Milan	Milan
20:30 CEST	Ronaldo 20' (pen.)	Report	Shevchenko 28'; Weah 89'	Stadium: Giuseppe Meazza; Attendance: 78 815; Referee: Borriello

31 October 1999 8	Verona	0–0	Milan	Verona
15:00 CET		Report		Stadium: Marcantonio Bentegodi; Attendance: 30 556; Referee: Pierluigi Collina

7 November 1999 9	Milan	3–0	Venezia	Milan
15:00 CET	Bierhoff 52'; Weah 63'; Orlandini 74'	Report		Stadium: San Siro; Attendance: 50 919; Referee: Rosetti

21 November 1999 10	Juventus	3–1	Milan	Turin
15:00 CET	Conte 23'; Inzaghi 51'; Kovačević 90'	Report	Zidane 21' (o.g.)	Stadium: Delle Alpi; Attendance: 48 118; Referee: De Santis

28 November 1999 11	Milan	2–1	Parma	Milan
15:00 CET	Boban 8'; Maldini 50'	Report	Crespo 46'	Stadium: San Siro; Attendance: 55 224; Referee: Pierluigi Collina

5 December 1999 12	Fiorentina	2–1	Milan	Florence
20:30 CET	Batistuta 22'; Heinrich 42'	Report	Bierhoff 1'	Stadium: Artemio Franchi; Attendance: 37 062; Referee: Borriello

11 December 1999 13	Milan	2–0	Torino	Milan
15:00 CET	Bierhoff 3'; Shevchenko 76' (pen.)	Report		Stadium: San Siro; Attendance: 50 417; Referee: Braschi

19 December 1999 14	Milan	2–2	Reggina	Milan
15:00 CET	Shevchenko 61', 74'	Report	Pirlo 30'; Kallon 79'	Stadium: San Siro; Attendance: 52 171; Referee: Preschern

6 January 2000 15	Piacenza	0–1	Milan	Piacenza
15:00 CET		Report	Bierhoff 31'	Stadium: Leonardo Garilli; Attendance: 14 945; Referee: Tombolini

9 January 2000 16	Milan	2–2	Roma	Milan
15:00 CET	Bierhoff 38'; José Mari 68'	Report	Delvecchio 8'; Montella 57'	Stadium: San Siro; Attendance: 52 838; Referee: Bazzoli

16 January 2000 17	Udinese	1–2	Milan	Udine
15:00 CET	Muzzi 86'	Report	Boban 40'; Shevchenko 61'	Stadium: Friuli; Attendance: 22 717; Referee: Pellegrino

23 January 2000 18	Milan	2–2	Lecce	Milan
15:00 CET	Maldini 62'; Bierhoff 69'	Report	Lucarelli 29'; Lucarelli 56'	Stadium: San Siro; Attendance: 56 636; Referee: Pierluigi Collina

30 January 2000 19	Perugia	0–3	Milan	Perugia
15:00 CET		Report	Shevchenko 69'; Shevchenko 73'; Shevchenko 76'	Stadium: Renato Curi; Attendance: 16 904; Referee: Farina

6 February 2000 20	Milan	4–1	Bari	Milan
15:00 CET	Boban 15'; Serginho 52'; Innocenti 84' (o.g.); Shevchenko 88'	Report		Stadium: San Siro; Attendance: 58 862; Referee: Borriello

12 February 2000 21	Bologna	2–3	Milan	Bologna
20:30 CET	Ingesson 58'; Eriberto 59'	Report	Gattuso 32'; Shevchenko 48'; Bierhoff 57'	Stadium: Renato Dall'Ara; Attendance: 34 457; Referee: Farina

20 February 2000 22	Milan	2–1	Lazio	Milan
15:00 CET	Boban 38' (pen.), 45' (pen.)	Report	S. Inzaghi 82'	Stadium: San Siro; Attendance: 68 943; Referee: Rosetti

27 February 2000 23	Cagliari	0–0	Milan	Cagliari
15:00 CET		Report		Stadium: Sant'Elia; Attendance: 23 146; Referee: Cesari

5 March 2000 24	Milan	1–2	Inter Milan	Milan
20:30 CET	Shevchenko 90' (pen.)	Report	Zamorano 43'; Di Biagio 63'	Stadium: San Siro; Attendance: 80 736; Referee: Trentalange

12 March 2000 25	Milan	3–3	Verona	Milan
15:00 CET	Albertini 16'; Shevchenko 33', 59' (pen.)	Report	Apolloni 51'; Laursen 54'; Cammarata 90+3'	Stadium: San Siro; Attendance: 54 031; Referee: Treossi

19 March 2000 26	Venezia	1–0	Milan	Venice
15:00 CET	Maniero 11'	Report		Stadium: Stadio Pierluigi Penzo; Attendance: 11 904; Referee: Rosetti

24 March 2000 27	Milan	2–0	Juventus	Milan
20:30 CET	Shevchenko 45'; Shevchenko 84' (pen.)	Report		Stadium: San Siro; Attendance: 82 146; Referee: Paparesta

2 April 2000 28	Parma	1–0	Milan	Parma
15:00 CEST	Crespo 68'	Report		Stadium: Il Tardini; Attendance: 25 919; Referee: Pierluigi Collina

9 April 2000 29	Milan	1–1	Fiorentina	Milan
15:00 CEST	Leonardo 76'	Report	Di Livio 70'	Stadium: San Siro; Attendance: 55 585; Referee: Pellegrino

16 April 2000 30	Torino	2–2	Milan	Turin
15:00 CEST	Pinga 29', 69'	Report	Ambrosini 13'; Guly 74'	Stadium: Delle Alpi; Attendance: 24 350; Referee: Pierluigi Collina

22 April 2000 31	Reggina	1–2	Milan	Reggina
15:00 CEST	Pirlo 25'	Report	Vargas 5' (o.g.); Shevchenko 14'	Stadium: Oreste Granillo; Attendance: 25986; Referee: Farina

30 April 2000 32	Milan	1–0	Piacenza	Milan
15:00 CEST	Ambrosini 15'	Report		Stadium: San Siro; Attendance: 53 608; Referee: Preschern

7 May 2000 33	Roma	1–1	Milan	Rome
15:00 CEST	Zago 11'	Report	Shevchenko 83' (pen.)	Stadium: Olimpico; Attendance: 64 058; Referee: Trentalange

14 May 2000 34	Milan	4–0	Udinese	Milan
15:00 CEST	Bierhoff 11'; Shevchenko 39' (pen.); West 59'; Leonardo 85'	Report		Stadium: San Siro; Attendance: 73 219; Referee: Cesari

=== Coppa Italia ===
==== Round of 16 ====
2 December 1999 1	Atalanta	3–2	Milan	Bergamo
	Caccia 70'; Nappi 87', 90'	Report	Shevchenko 14'; Leonardo 67'	Stadium: Stadio Atleti Azzurri d'Italia; Attendance: 20 000; Referee: Trentalange

14 December 1999 2	Milan	3–0 (5–3 agg.)	Atalanta	Milan
	Bierhoff 40'; Guly 53', 65'	Report		Stadium: San Siro; Attendance: 9 812; Referee: Treossi

==== Quarterfinals ====
12 January 2000 1	Milan	2–3	Inter Milan	Milan
	Shevchenko 44', 55'	Report	Vieri 29'; Mutu 54'; Seedorf 69'	Stadium: San Siro; Attendance: 32 645; Referee: Farina

27 January 2000 2	Inter Milan	1–1 (4–3 agg.)	Milan	Milan
	Baggio 37'	Report	Shevchenko 35'	Stadium: San Siro; Attendance: 63 823; Referee: Treossi

=== UEFA Champions League ===
==== Group stage ====
Pos	Team	Pld	W	D	L	GF	GA	GD	Pts	Qualification	CHE	HER	GAL	MIL
1	(England) Chelsea	6	3	2	1	10	3	+7	11	Advance to second group stage	—	2–0	1–0	0–0
2	(Germany) Hertha BSC	6	2	2	2	7	10	−3	8	Advance to second group stage	2–1	—	1–4	1–0
3	(Turkey) Galatasaray	6	2	1	3	10	13	−3	7	Transfer to UEFA Cup	0–5	2–2	—	3–2
4	(Italy) Milan	6	1	3	2	6	7	−1	6		1–1	1–1	2–1	—

Source: UEFA

15 September 1999	Chelsea (England)	0–0	(Italy) Milan	London
20:45		Report		Stadium: Stamford Bridge; Attendance: 34,000; Referee: (Sweden) Anders Frisk

21 September 1999	Milan (Italy)	2–1	(Turkey) Galatasaray	Milan
20:45	Leonardo 44'; Shevchenko 45'	Report	Ümit 50'	Stadium: San Siro; Attendance: 37,000; Referee: (Scotland) Hugh Dallas

28 September 1999	Milan (Italy)	1–1	(Germany) Hertha BSC	Milan
20:45	Bierhoff 74'	Report	Daei 69'	Stadium: San Siro; Attendance: 40,941; Referee: (France) Gilles Veissière

20 October 1999	Hertha BSC (Germany)	1–0	(Italy) Milan	Berlin
20:45	Wosz 41'	Report		Stadium: Olympic Stadium; Attendance: 75,000; Referee: (Spain) José María García-Aranda

26 October 1999	Milan (Italy)	1–1	(England) Chelsea	Milan
20:45	Bierhoff 74'	Report	Wise 77'	Stadium: San Siro; Attendance: 74,855; Referee: (Russia) Nikolai Levnikov

3 November 1999	Galatasaray (Turkey)	3–2	(Italy) Milan	Istanbul
21:45	Capone 27'; Şükür 87'; Ümit 90' (pen.)	Report	Weah 20'; Giunti 51'	Stadium: Ali Sami Yen Stadium; Attendance: 22,000; Referee: (Spain) Antonio López Nieto

== Statistics ==
=== Players statistics ===
No.	Pos	Nat	Player	Total		Serie A		Coppa Italia		UEFA Champions League	
No.	Pos	Nat	Player	Apps	Goals	Apps	Goals	Apps	Goals	Apps	Goals
12	GK	(Italy) ITA	Abbiati	35	-40	29	-33	0	0	6	-7
5	DF	(Italy) ITA	Costacurta	34	0	27	0	2	0	5	0
26	DF	(Italy) ITA	Sala	24	0	16+4	0	3	0	1	0
3	DF	(Italy) ITA	Maldini	37	1	27	1	4	0	6	0
24	MF	(Argentina) ARG	Guly	32	3	19+4	1	4	2	5	0
23	MF	(Italy) ITA	Ambrosini	35	2	25+4	2	4	0	2	0
4	MF	(Italy) ITA	Albertini	32	1	23+3	1	1	0	5	0
8	MF	(Italy) ITA	Gattuso	28	1	16+6	1	1	0	5	0
27	MF	(Brazil) BRA	Serginho	31	2	18+6	2	2	0	5	0
20	FW	(Germany) GER	Bierhoff	39	14	28+2	11	3	1	6	2
7	FW	(Ukraine) UKR	Shevchenko	42	29	30+2	24	4	4	6	1
1	GK	(Italy) ITA	Rossi	9	-14	5	-7	4	-7	0	0
15	MF	(Italy) ITA	De Ascentis	23	0	14+5	0	4	0	0	0
19	DF	(Argentina) ARG	Chamot	14	0	13	0	1	0	0	0
18	MF	(Brazil) BRA	Leonardo	26	6	11+9	4	1	1	5	1
10	MF	(Croatia) CRO	Boban	22	6	11+6	6	3	0	2	0
21	MF	(Italy) ITA	Giunti	32	1	11+13	0	3	0	5	1
2	MF	(Denmark) DEN	Helveg	32	0	10+17	0	1	0	4	0
14	DF	(Argentina) ARG	Ayala	22	0	9+4	0	3	0	6	0
9	FW	(Liberia) LBR	Weah	13	5	8+2	4	2	0	1	1
25	DF	(France) FRA	N'Gotty	12	0	7+2	0	1	0	2	0
41	FW	(Spain) ESP	José Mari	17	1	6+9	1	2	0	0	0
13	DF	(Nigeria) NGR	Taribo West	4	1	3+1	1	0	0	0	0
19	MF	(Italy) ITA	Orlandini	5	1	1+1	1	1	0	2	0
33	FW	(Nigeria) NGR	Aliyu Datti	1	0	0+1	0	0	0	0	0
11	FW	(Italy) ITA	Ganz	3	1	0+1	1	1	0	1	0
38	DF	(Argentina) ARG	Coloccini	0	0	0	0	0	0	0	0
40	GK	(Italy) ITA	Fiori	0	0	0	0	0	0	0	0
16	DF	(Italy) ITA	Tonetto	1	0	0	0	1	0	0	0

- Source: http://calcio-seriea.net/presenze/1999/1171/

=== Goalscorers ===
- (Ukraine) Andriy Shevchenko 24
- (Germany) Oliver Bierhoff 11
- (Croatia) Zvonimir Boban 5
- (Brazil) Leonardo 4
- (Liberia) George Weah 3
