= 2001–02 AC Milan season =

Milan
2001–02 season
- President: Silvio Berlusconi
- Manager: Fatih Terim (until 5 November 2001); Carlo Ancelotti
- Stadium: San Siro
- Serie A: 4th
- Coppa Italia: Semi-finals
- UEFA Cup: Semi-finals
- Top goalscorer: League: Andriy Shevchenko (14); All: Andriy Shevchenko (17)
- Average home league attendance: 58,616
Home colours	Away colours	Third colours

Associazione Calcio Milan had another mediocre season in 2001–02, and the squad fell short of expectations. Milan finished 4th in the league, earning qualification to the Champions League, thanks to a strong conclusion to the season, holding off Chievo, Lazio and Bologna.

In Europe, Milan did well for much of the season and reached the semi-finals of the UEFA Cup, but were eliminated by a strong Borussia Dortmund side (who went on to win the Bundesliga that season), losing 4–0 at the Westfalenstadion in the first leg; Milan rallied and won 3–1 at the San Siro in the second leg, but this victory was not enough.

The poor start to the season led to the early dismissal of newly appointed manager Fatih Terim, who was replaced by Carlo Ancelotti on 5 November 2001.

== Squad ==
Squad at end of season

Note: Flags indicate national team as defined under FIFA eligibility rules; some limited exceptions apply. Players may hold more than one non-FIFA nationality.

No.	Pos.	Nation	Player
1	GK	ITA	Sebastiano Rossi
2	DF	DEN	Thomas Helveg
3	DF	ITA	Paolo Maldini (Captain)
4	MF	ITA	Demetrio Albertini
5	DF	ITA	Alessandro Costacurta
7	FW	UKR	Andriy Shevchenko
8	MF	ITA	Gennaro Gattuso
9	FW	ITA	Filippo Inzaghi
10	MF	POR	Rui Costa
12	GK	ITA	Valerio Fiori
13	DF	GEO	Kakha Kaladze
14	FW	ESP	José Mari
15	MF	ITA	Massimo Donati
16	DF	ARG	José Chamot
18	GK	ITA	Christian Abbiati

No.	Pos.	Nation	Player
19	FW	ESP	Javi Moreno
20	DF	SEN	Mohamed Sarr
21	MF	ITA	Andrea Pirlo
22	DF	ROU	Cosmin Contra
23	MF	ITA	Massimo Ambrosini
24	DF	DEN	Martin Laursen
25	DF	BRA	Roque Júnior
26	FW	BLR	Vitaly Kutuzov
27	MF	BRA	Serginho
29	MF	FRA	Ibrahim Ba
32	MF	ITA	Cristian Brocchi
34	MF	TUR	Ümit Davala
55	MF	ITA	Marco Donadel
77	MF	ITA	Francesco Coco
69	FW	ITA	Marco Simone
83	DF	GAB	Catilina Aubameyang

=== Transfers ===
In
Pos.	Name	from	Type
MF	Rui Costa	Fiorentina	(₤85 million)
FW	Filippo Inzaghi	Juventus	(₤70 million)
MF	Andrea Pirlo	Internazionale	(₤35 million)
DF	Martin Laursen	Parma	
MF	Cristian Brocchi	Internazionale	
FW	Javi Moreno	Alaves	
DF	Cosmin Contra	Alaves	
DF	Cristian Zenoni	Atalanta	
MF	Ümit Davala	Galatasaray	
FW	Vitali Kutuzov	BATE Borisov	
DF	Mohamed Sarr	Treviso	
MF	Massimo Donati	Atalanta	
FW	Luca Saudati	Perugia	co-ownership
FW	Marco Simone	Monaco	loan
GK	Gabriele Aldegani	Monza	loan ended
GK	Gabriele Aldegani	Alaves	loan ended
DF	Fabricio Coloccini	San Lorenzo	loan ended
MF	Dražen Brnčić	Vicenza	loan ended
FW	Mohammed Aliyu Datti	Monza	loan ended
FW	Mattia Graffiedi	Ternana	loan ended
FW	Alessandro Iannuzzi	Monza	loan ended

Out
Pos.	Name	To	Type
MF	Zvonimir Boban	Celta Vigo	loan
FW	Oliver Bierhoff	Monaco	
MF	Leonardo	Sao Paulo	
MF	Andres Guly	Internazionale	
DF	Luigi Sala	Atalanta	(₤7 billion)
FW	Gianni Comandini	Atalanta	₤30 billion
MF	Federico Giunti	Brescia	
DF	Cyril Domoraud	Monaco	
DF	Cristian Zenoni	Juventus	
MF	Dražen Brnčić	Internazionale	
FW	Mattia Graffiedi	Cesena	
FW	Alessandro Iannuzzi	Messina	
FW	Luca Saudati	Atalanta	
GK	Gabriele Aldegani	Alaves	loan
GK	Gabriele Aldegani	Cosenza	loan
GK	Dida	Corinthians	loan
DF	Francesco Coco	Barcelona	loan
DF	Fabricio Coloccini	Alaves	loan
DF	Daniele Daino	Derby County	loan
MF	Ibrahim Ba	Marseille	loan
MF	Pablo García	Venezia	loan
DF	Mirco Sadotti	Pescara	co-ownership ended
DF	Max Tonetto	Lecce	co-ownership ended

==== Winter ====
In
Pos.	Name	from	Type
MF	Ibrahim Ba	Marseille	loan ended

Out
Pos.	Name	To	Type

=== Reserves ===
Note: Flags indicate national team as defined under FIFA eligibility rules; some limited exceptions apply. Players may hold more than one non-FIFA nationality.

No.	Pos.	Nation	Player
33	MF	ITA	Paolo Sammarco
40	MF	ITA	Matteo Deinite

No.	Pos.	Nation	Player
55	MF	ITA	Marco Donadel
83	MF	GAB	Catilina Aubameyang

== Competitions ==
Win Draw Loss

=== Serie A ===
==== League table ====
Pos	Team	Pld	W	D	L	GF	GA	GD	Pts	Qualification or relegation
2	Roma	34	19	13	2	58	24	+34	70	Qualification to Champions League first group stage
3	Internazionale	34	20	9	5	62	35	+27	69	Qualification to Champions League third qualifying round
4	Milan	34	14	13	7	47	33	+14	55	Qualification to Champions League third qualifying round
5	Chievo	34	14	12	8	57	52	+5	54	Qualification to UEFA Cup first round
6	Lazio	34	14	11	9	50	37	+13	53	Qualification to UEFA Cup first round

Source: 2001–02 Serie A, Soccerway
Rules for classification: 1) Points; 2) Head-to-head points; 3) Head-to-head goal difference; 4) Goal difference; 5) Goals scored; 6) Draw. (Note: Head-to-head record is used only after all the matches between the teams in question have been played).

==== Results summary ====
Overall								Home						Away					
Pld	W	D	L	GF	GA	GD	Pts	W	D	L	GF	GA	GD	W	D	L	GF	GA	GD
34	14	13	7	47	33	+14	55	7	8	2	25	14	+11	7	5	5	22	19	+3

Source: Competitive matches

==== Results by round ====
Round	1	2	3	4	5	6	7	8	9	10	11	12	13	14	15	16	17	18	19	20	21	22	23	24	25	26	27	28	29	30	31	32	33	34
Ground	A	H	A	H	A	H	A	H	A	H	A	H	H	A	A	H	A	H	A	H	A	H	H	A	H	A	H	A	H	A	A	H	A	H
Result	D	W	W	W	L	D	W	D	L	D	W	W	D	L	D	W	W	D	D	L	D	D	D	W	L	L	W	W	W	D	L	D	W	W
Position	5	3	2	1	3	4	2	2	5	6	4	4	4	5	5	5	5	5	5	5	5	6	6	6	6	6	6	6	5	5	6	6	4	4

Source: Competitive matches
A = Away; H = Home; W = Win; D = Draw; L = Loss; P = Postponed; = Leader, 2002–03 UEFA Champions League Group stage; = 2002–03 UEFA Champions League Group stage; = 2002–03 UEFA Champions League Qualifying round; = 2002–03 UEFA Cup First round; = Qualification to Intertoto Cup; = 2002–03 Serie B

==== Results ====
26 August 2001 1	Brescia	2–2	Milan	Brescia
15:00 CEST	Tare 36', 40'	Report	Brocchi 50'; Shevchenko 63' (pen.)	Stadium: Mario Rigamonti; Attendance: 18 827

9 September 2001 2	Milan	5–2	Fiorentina	Milan
20:30 CEST	Shevchenko 16', 52'; Laursen 40'; Inzaghi 45'; Serginho 78'	Report	Chiesa 18', 58'	Stadium: San Siro; Attendance: 54 849

16 September 2001 3	Udinese	1–2	Milan	Udine
20:45 CEST	Muzzi 74'	Report	Shevchenko 14'; Inzaghi 54'	Stadium: Friuli; Attendance: 17 402

23 September 2001 4	Milan	2–0	Lazio	Milan
20:30 CEST	Inzaghi 41'; Laursen 56'	Report		Stadium: San Siro; Attendance: 57 048

30 September 2001 5	Perugia	3–1	Milan	Perugia
15:00 CEST	Bazzani 57'; Tedesco 75'; Vryzas 78'	Report	Kaladze 67'	Stadium: Renato Curi; Attendance: 14 964

14 October 2001 6	Milan	1–1	Venezia	Milan
15:00 CEST	Shevchenko 43'	Report	Bazzani 61'	Stadium: San Siro; Attendance: 52 192

21 October 2001 7	Inter Milan	2–4	Milan	Milan
20:30 CEST	Ventola 13'; Kallon 90'	Report	Shevchenko 59', 77'; Contra 61'; Inzaghi 66'	Stadium: Giuseppe Meazza; Attendance: 78 124

28 October 2001 8	Milan	0–0	Bologna	Milan
15:00 CET		Report		Stadium: San Siro; Attendance: 56 421

4 November 2001 9	Torino	1–0	Milan	Turin
20:30 CET	Lucarelli 27'	Report		Stadium: Delle Alpi; Attendance: 20 174

18 November 2001 10	Milan	0–0	Piacenza	Milan
15:00 CET		Report		Stadium: San Siro; Attendance: 50 927

25 November 2001 11	Parma	0–1	Milan	Parma
15:00 CET		Report	Inzaghi 30'	Stadium: Il Tardini; Attendance: 22 527

2 December 2001 12	Milan	3–2	Chievo	Milan
15:00 CET	Inzaghi 14'; Shevchenko 58' (pen.), 65'	Report	Marazzina 26'; Corradi 29'	Stadium: San Siro

9 December 2001 13	Milan	1–1	Juventus	Milan
20:30 CET	Shevchenko 23'	Report	Del Piero 47' (pen.)	Stadium: San Siro

16 December 2001 14	Roma	1–0	Milan	Rome
20:30 CET	Totti 48'	Report		Stadium: Olimpico

19 December 2001 15	Atalanta	1–1	Milan	Bergamo
15:00 CET	Sala 32'	Report	Shevchenko 57'	Stadium: Atleti Azzurri d'Italia; Referee: Alfredo Trentalange

23 December 2001 16	Milan	2–1	Verona	Milan
15:00 CET	Ambrosini 58'; Contra 90'	Report	P. Cannavaro 70'	Stadium: San Siro

5 January 2002 17	Lecce	0–1	Milan	Lecco
20:30 CET		Report	José Mari 78'	Stadium: Via del Mare

13 January 2002 18	Milan	0–0	Brescia	Milan
15:00 CET		Report		Stadium: San Siro

20 January 2002 19	Fiorentina	1–1	Milan	Florence
20:30 CET	Adriano 90'	Report	José Mari 52'	Stadium: Artemio Franchi

27 January 2002 20	Milan	2–3	Udinese	Milan
15:00 CET	Shevchenko 5'; Serginho 13'	Report	Muzzi 33'; Scarlato 52'; Jørgensen 78'	Stadium: San Siro

3 February 2002 21	Lazio	1–1	Milan	Rome
20:30 CET	Stanković 20'	Report	Shevchenko 90'	Stadium: Olimpico

10 February 2002 22	Milan	1–1	Perugia	Milan
15:00 CET	Serginho 17' (pen.)	Report	Bazzani 46'	Stadium: San Siro

16 February 2002 23	Milan	0–0	Atalanta	Milan
20:30 CET		Report		Stadium: San Siro

24 February 2002 24	Venezia	1–4	Milan
15:00 CET	Maniero 16'	Report	Kaladze 12'; Javi Moreno 68', 80'; Contra 74'

3 March 2002 25	Milan	0–1	Inter Milan	Milan
20:30 CET		Report	Vieri 78'	Stadium: San Siro

10 March 2002 26	Bologna	2–0	Milan
15:15 CET	Fresi 3'; Cruz 24'	Report

17 March 2002 27	Milan	2–1	Torino	Milan
20:30 CET	Kaladze 51'; Ambrosini 79'	Report	Ferrante 63' (pen.)	Stadium: San Siro

24 March 2002 28	Piacenza	0–1	Milan
15:00 CET		Report	Serginho 66' (pen.)

30 March 2002 29	Milan	3–1	Parma	Milan
15:00 CET	Inzaghi 48', 90'; Pirlo 77'	Report	Di Vaio 14'	Stadium: San Siro

7 April 2002 30	Chievo	1–1	Milan
15:00 CEST	Moro 22'	Report	Inzaghi 13'

14 April 2002 31	Juventus	1–0	Milan
15:00 CEST	Chamot 68' (o.g.)	Report

21 April 2002 32	Milan	0–0	Roma	Milan
15:00 CEST		Report		Stadium: San Siro

28 April 2002 33	Verona	1–2	Milan	Verona
15:00 CEST	Mutu 28'	Report	Inzaghi 65'; Pirlo 82'	Stadium: Marcantonio Bentegodi

5 May 2002 34	Milan	3–0	Lecce	Milan
15:00 CEST	Kaladze 6'; Ambrosini 44'; Shevchenko 48'	Report		Stadium: San Siro

=== Coppa Italia ===
==== Round of 16 ====
13 November 2001 1	Milan	3–0	Perugia	Milan
20:45 CET	Inzaghi 50', 73'; Sogliano 82' (o.g.)	Report		Stadium: San Siro; Attendance: 5 569; Referee: Diego Preschern

28 November 2001 2	Perugia	0–0 (0–3 agg.)	Milan	Perugia
18:00 CET		Report		Stadium: Renato Curi; Attendance: 1 858; Referee: Tiziano Pieri

==== Quarterfinals ====
10 January 2002 1	Milan	2–1	Lazio	Milan
20:45 CET	Simone 22'; Javi Moreno 90+1'	Report	César 45'	Stadium: San Siro; Attendance: 5 391; Referee: Domenico Messina
Note: Match rescheduled from 13 December 2001 due to fog.

16 January 2002 2	Lazio	2–3 (3–5 agg.)	Milan	Rome
20:45 CET	S. Inzaghi 23'; Crespo 75'	Report	José Mari 5'; Javi Moreno 53', 56'	Stadium: Olimpico; Attendance: 15 000; Referee: Stefano Farina

==== Semifinals ====
23 January 2002 1	Milan	1–2	Juventus	Milan
20:45 CET	Javi Moreno 39'	Report	Birindelli 48'; Del Piero 86'	Stadium: San Siro; Attendance: 27 687; Referee: Stefano Braschi

6 February 2002 2	Juventus	1–1 (3–2 agg.)	Milan	Turin
20:45 CET	Zambrotta 62'	Report	José Mari 27'	Stadium: Delle Alpi; Attendance: 15 000; Referee: Paolo Bertini

=== UEFA Cup ===
==== First round ====
20 September 2001	BATE Borisov (Belarus)	0–2	(Italy) Milan	Minsk
20:30 CEST		Report	Shevchenko 64'; Javi Moreno 88'	Stadium: Dinamo Stadium; Attendance: 4 500; Referee: (England) Stephen Dunn

27 September 2001	Milan (Italy)	4–0 (6–0 agg.)	(Belarus) BATE Borisov	Milan
20:45 CEST	Rui Costa 21'; Javi Moreno 45'; Sarr 56'; Inzaghi 74' (pen.)	Report		Stadium: San Siro; Attendance: 6 000; Referee: (Germany) Franz-Xaver Wack

==== Second round ====
18 October 2001	Milan (Italy)	2–0	(Bulgaria) CSKA Sofia	Milan
20:45 CEST	Rui Costa 20'; Shevchenko 51'	Report		Stadium: San Siro; Attendance: 6 759; Referee: (Denmark) Claus Bo Larsen

1 November 2001	CSKA Sofia (Bulgaria)	0–1 (0–3 agg.)	(Italy) Milan	Sofia
17:45 CEST		Report	Inzaghi 62'	Stadium: Vasil Levski National Stadium; Attendance: 22 000; Referee: (England) Dermot Gallagher

==== Third round ====
22 November 2001	Milan (Italy)	2–0	(Portugal) Sporting Lisbon	Milan
20:45 CET	Shevchenko 37'; Inzaghi 77'	Report		Stadium: San Siro; Attendance: 10 132; Referee: (Spain) Juan Fernández Marín

6 December 2001	Sporting Lisbon (Portugal)	1–1 (2–3 agg.)	(Italy) Milan	Lisbon
20:45 CET	Niculae 49'	Report	Javi Moreno 90'	Stadium: Estádio José Alvalade; Attendance: 37 523; Referee: (Poland) Ryszard Wójcik

==== Round of 16 ====
19 February 2002	Roda Kerkrade (Netherlands)	0–1	(Italy) Milan	Kerkrade
18:00 CET		Report	José Mari 29'	Stadium: Parkstad Limburg Stadion; Attendance: 20 000; Referee: (England) Graham Barber

28 February 2002	Milan (Italy)	0–1 (a.e.t.) (1–1 agg.) (3–2 p)	(Netherlands) Roda Kerkrade	Milan
20:45 CET		Report	Luijpers 70'	Stadium: San Siro; Attendance: 7 291; Referee: (Germany) Wolfgang Stark
	Penalties
	Brocchi (penalty scored); José Mari (penalty missed); Kaladze (penalty missed); Pirlo (penalty scored); Contra (penalty scored)		(penalty scored) Anastasiou; (penalty scored) Lawal; (penalty missed) Soetaers; (penalty missed) Luijpers; (penalty missed) Van der Luer

==== Quarterfinals ====
14 March 2002	Hapoel Tel Aviv (Israel)	1–0	(Italy) Milan	Nicosia
20:00 CET	Cleșcenco 32'	Report		Stadium: GSP Stadium; Attendance: 5 000; Referee: (Spain) Antonio López Nieto

21 March 2002	Milan (Italy)	2–0 (2–1 agg.)	(Israel) Hapoel Tel Aviv	Milan
20:20 CET	Rui Costa 5'; Gershon 45' (o.g.)	Report		Stadium: San Siro; Attendance: 23 184; Referee: (Germany) Herbert Fandel

==== Semifinals ====
4 April 2002	Borussia Dortmund (Germany)	4–0	(Italy) Milan	Dortmund
20:30 CEST	Amoroso 7' (pen.), 33', 39'; Heinrich 63'	Report		Stadium: Westfalenstadion; Attendance: 52 000; Referee: (England) Graham Poll

11 April 2002	Milan (Italy)	3–1 (3–5 agg.)	(Germany) Borussia Dortmund	Milan
20:45 CEST	Inzaghi 11'; Contra 19'; Serginho 90+2' (pen.)	Report	Ricken 90+4'	Stadium: San Siro; Attendance: 15 301; Referee: (France) Gilles Veissière

== Squad statistics ==
=== Appearances and goals ===
No.	Pos	Nat	Player	Total		Serie A		Coppa		UEFA	
No.	Pos	Nat	Player	Apps	Goals	Apps	Goals	Apps	Goals	Apps	Goals
18	GK	(Italy) ITA	Abbiati	46	-33	34	-33	1	0	11	0
22	DF	(Romania) ROU	Contra	43	3	20+9	3	4	0	9+1	0
5	DF	(Italy) ITA	Costacurta	31	0	20+1	0	3	0	6+1	0
16	DF	(Argentina) ARG	Chamot	32	0	20+2	0	5	0	5	0
13	DF	(Georgia (country)) GEO	Kaladze	46	4	27+3	4	5	0	9+2	0
8	MF	(Italy) ITA	Gattuso	47	0	32	0	5	0	8+2	0
4	MF	(Italy) ITA	Albertini	36	0	23+1	0	4	0	7+1	0
10	MF	(Portugal) POR	Rui Costa	33	3	20+2	0	1	0	8+2	3
27	MF	(Brazil) BRA	Serginho	39	5	24+3	4	4	0	6+2	1
7	FW	(Ukraine) UKR	Shevchenko	38	17	28+1	14	3	0	6	3
9	FW	(Italy) ITA	Inzaghi	28	16	19+1	10	1	2	6+1	4
1	GK	(Italy) ITA	Rossi	6	-6	0	0	5	-6	1	0
24	DF	(Denmark) DEN	Laursen	37	2	18+4	2	6	0	8+1	0
3	DF	(Italy) ITA	Maldini	19	0	15	0	0	0	4	0
14	FW	(Spain) ESP	José Mari	23	5	14+1	2	3	2	4+1	1
2	DF	(Denmark) DEN	Helveg	24	0	12+3	0	4	0	5	0
25	DF	(Brazil) BRA	Roque Júnior	32	0	11+7	0	5	0	8+1	0
21	MF	(Italy) ITA	Pirlo	29	2	7+11	2	2	0	4+5	0
15	MF	(Italy) ITA	Donati	28	0	6+11	0	4	0	5+2	0
23	MF	(Italy) ITA	Ambrosini	13	3	6+3	3	1	0	3	0
34	MF	(Turkey) TUR	Ümit Davala	13	0	6+4	0	3	0	0	0
32	MF	(Italy) ITA	Brocchi	24	1	5+7	1	5	0	3+4	0
69	FW	(Italy) ITA	Simone	15	1	4+5	0	3	1	1+2	0
19	FW	(Spain) ESP	Moreno	27	9	3+13	2	4	4	4+3	3
20	DF	(Senegal) SEN	Sarr	3	1	0+1	0	0	0	1+1	1
83	DF	(Gabon) GAB	Aubameyang	1	0	0	0	0	0	0+1	0
29	MF	(France) FRA	Ba	2	0	0+2	0	0	0	0	0
55	MF	(Italy) ITA	Donadel	2	0	0	0	1	0	0+1	0
26	FW	(Belarus) BLR	Kutuzov	4	0	0+2	0	2	0	0	0
12	GK	(Italy) ITA	Fiori	0	0	0	0	0	0		
Players transferred out during the season
77	MF	(Italy) ITA	Coco	1	0	0+1	0	0	0	0	0

Last updated: 30 May 2002
Source: http://calcio-seriea.net/rose/2001/1199/

== Sources ==
- RSSF - Italy 2001/02
