= Massimo Ambrosini =

Italian footballer (born 1977)

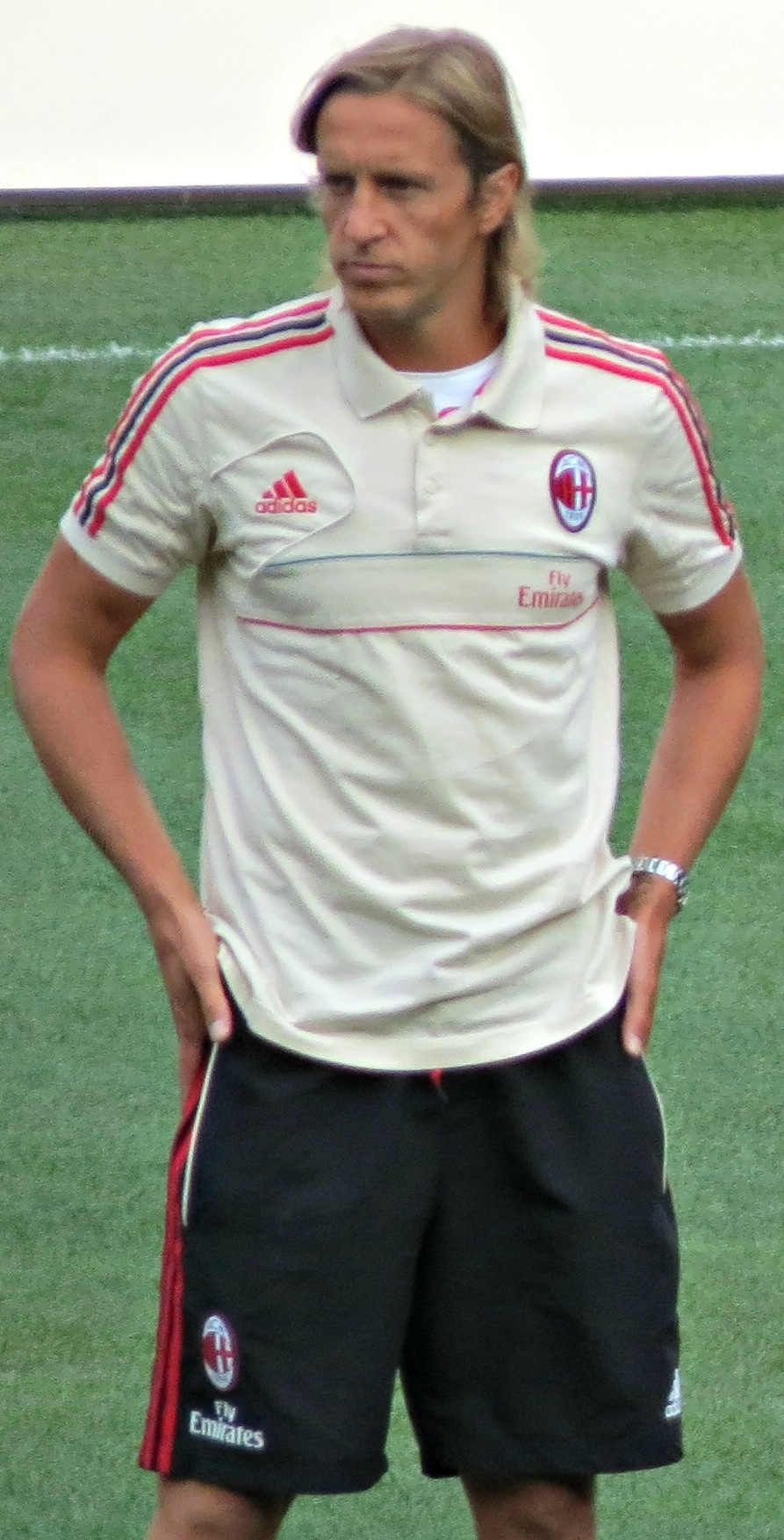
- Ambrosini with AC Milan in 2012

Personal information
- Full name: Massimo Ambrosini
- Date of birth: 29 May 1977 (age 49)
- Place of birth: Pesaro, Italy
- Height: 1.82 m (6 ft 0 in)
- Position: Midfielder

Youth career
- 1992–1994: Cesena

Senior career*
Years	Team	Apps	(Gls)
1994–1995	Cesena	25	(1)
1995–2013	AC Milan	344	(29)
1997–1998	→ Vicenza (loan)	27	(1)
2013–2014	Fiorentina	21	(0)
Total		417	(31)

International career
1995	Italy U18	22	(4)
1995–2000	Italy U21	18	(1)
1999–2008	Italy	35	(0)
Medal record
Men's football
Representing Italy
UEFA European Championship
Runner-up	2000 Belgium–Netherlands
- * Club domestic league appearances and goals

Massimo Ambrosini Cavaliere OMRI (Italian pronunciation: [ˈmassimo ambroˈziːni]; born 29 May 1977) is an Italian former professional footballer who mainly played as a defensive midfielder. At club level, he is mostly known for his successful time at Italian team AC Milan, where he spent eighteen years of his career, winning several titles, and captained the side from 2009 to 2013 following the retirement of Paolo Maldini. Ambrosini retired from professional football in 2014, after a season with Fiorentina.

At international level, he represented Italy at the 2000 Summer Olympics, and in two UEFA European Championships, winning a runners-up medal at UEFA Euro 2000.

He currently works as a pundit and football commentator for Sky Sport Italia.

== Club career ==
=== AC Milan ===
Ambrosini began his career with Cesena and graduated to their first team at the age of 17 during the 1994–95 season. AC Milan coach Fabio Capello then won the race to sign him the following year, and despite facing tough competition to break into the all-star Milan side, Ambrosini was given a handful of games as the team romped to the Serie A championship. Used in the 1996–97 season only sporadically, Ambrosini was sent on loan to Vicenza, where he was given a spot in the team's starting line-up almost immediately, and helped his team avoid relegation at the end of the season. He also reached the semi-final of UEFA Cup Winners' Cup with Vicenza. Recalled to the San Siro, Ambrosini at last made a first-team place his own as Milan won back the Serie A championship in 1999. A regular the following term, he then saw his chances limited by a troublesome knee injury before returning to full fitness to help Milan win the Coppa Italia (scoring in a 4–1 win in the first leg of the final over Roma) and the UEFA Champions League during the 2002–03 season, where he replaced Rui Costa in the 87th minute of the final against Juventus, held at Old Trafford.

In 2003–04, although unable to establish himself as a first-team starter due to a series of niggling injuries and a loss of form, Ambrosini made 20 Serie A appearances – predominantly as a substitute – and scored one goal as Milan captured their 17th Serie A championship. In March 2005, he renewed his contract to June 2008.

In 2004–05, he struggled to break into Milan first team, making only made 22 Serie A appearances and scoring one goal. It is his late goal, however, that took Milan to the UEFA Champions League final. With Milan losing 2–0, a scoreline which would have sent the match to extra time as Milan defeated PSV with the same score in the San Siro, Ambrosini scored a header in second half injury time to bring the score to 2–1 and give Milan the 3–2 aggregate lead. PSV immediately responded with a goal of their own to tie the aggregate score at 3–3, but Milan advanced to the final on the away goals rule. Ambrosini, however, missed the final in Istanbul with yet another injury as Milan were defeated on penalties by Liverpool.

In 2005–06, he again suffered a series of injuries which limited him to just 13 Serie A appearances and one goal, thus making him out of contention for the Italian squad for the 2006 FIFA World Cup in Germany.

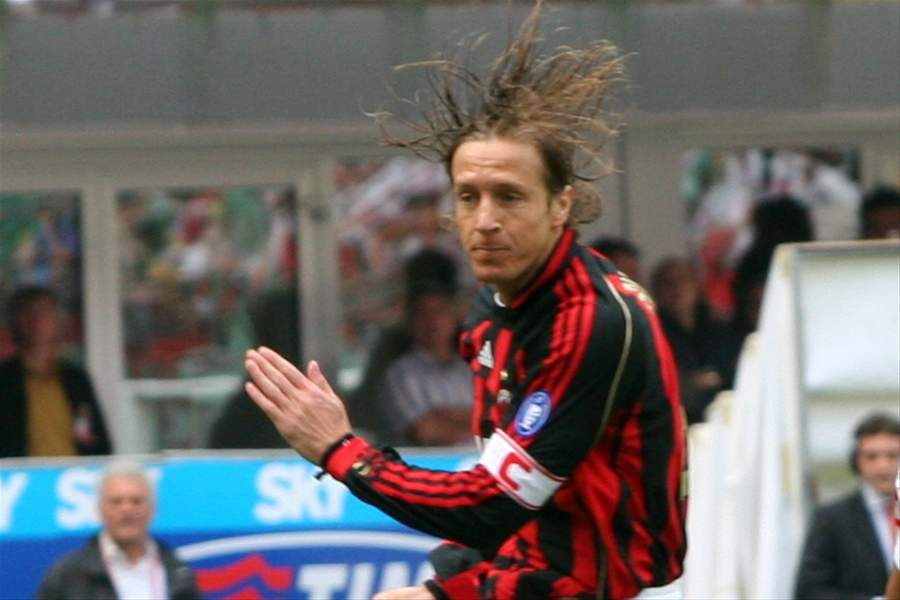
Ambrosini with Milan in May 2007

Unlike the previous seasons, 2006–07 became Ambrosini's late breakthrough as he had fully recovered from his recurring injuries. Although not an immediate starter at the beginning, following a series of stunning performances, he eventually made his way into the team's starting 11, prompting Carlo Ancelotti to change his preferred formation from 4–3–1–2 to 4–3–2–1 (alternatively, 4–4–1–1), in which he would play a left-sided defensive midfielder, in a role similar to that of Gennaro Gattuso responsible for winning back possession and passing the ball to either a deep-lying playmaker Andrea Pirlo or other attacking players. He scored two decisive goals in Serie A against Sampdoria and Atalanta, both with his head. He was also a key member to Milan's victory over Bayern Munich and Manchester United in the UEFA Champions League, balancing the game for Milan through his vision and leadership skills; his long pass from his team's half of the pitch to an unmarked striker Alberto Gilardino helped ensure Milan's eventual 3–0 victory as Gilardino scored a goal that drastically reduced Manchester United's chances of a comeback. This game also prompted Ambrosini to change his mind about leaving Milan due to lack of playing time and extend his contract until June 2010.

Later that month, Ambrosini started in the final of the 2006–07 Champions League and played a strong game in Milan's eventual 2–1 win over Liverpool. He was also the last player to touch the ball seconds before the final whistle. In Paolo Maldini's absence, Ambrosini was once again the stand-in captain for the European Super Cup Final against UEFA Cup winners Sevilla FC, which Milan won 3–1.

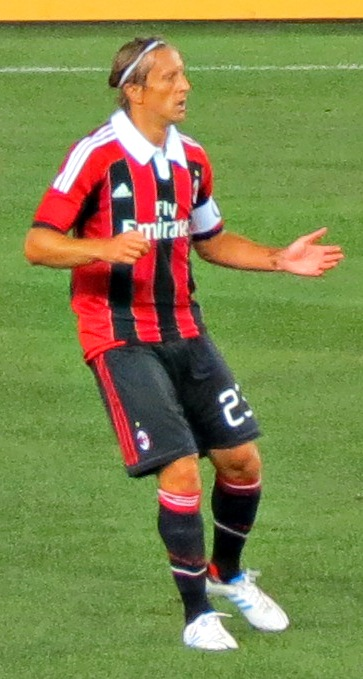
Ambrosini in 2012

Ambrosini was Milan captain in the absence of Paolo Maldini throughout the 2007–08 campaign. In this campaign, Ambrosini scored four goals. He scored decisive goals against Palermo and Empoli, and played very well in the home leg of the Milan derby against Internazionale on 4 May 2008, setting up the second goal for teammate Kaká and putting in an excellent performance throughout the game, which Milan won 2–1. However, Milan had failed to earn 3 points in each single game leading up to a 4–1 win against Udinese on the final day of the season, thus finishing only in fifth place and qualifying for 2008–09 UEFA Cup instead of the desired Champions League.

During the 2008–09 campaign, Ambrosini was once again a regular fixture in the Milan starting lineup, making 26 appearances in the team's Serie A campaign. During a pre-season friendly tournament against Juventus, Ambrosini was named Man of the Match as he netted twice to secure a Milan victory. His second goal was a superb effort into the roof of the net, past a bewildered Alex Manninger.

This season was also memorable for him as he had managed a season total of eight goals (one in the UEFA Cup), more than he has scored in any season in his career with Milan. The goals included a brilliant header off David Beckham's free kick against Lazio, and a well-placed goal in a 5–1 win over Torino. Ambrosini also scored his first double in a competitive fixture in a 3–2 loss to Roma during Paolo Maldini's final home game, and received a standing ovation from the home crowd despite being sent off by the referee for a second yellow card.

On 6 July 2009, as the Milan team reunited for pre-season training, Ambrosini was officially named club captain, inheriting the armband from Paolo Maldini. On 8 September 2009, he added one more year to his contract, extending his stay with the team at least until 2011. He won the Serie A title in 2010–11 season with three games in hand, edging out city rivals Internazionale. On 19 May 2011, he signed a new, one-year contract. After a disappointing second-place finish in the 2011–12 season and the departure of fellow team greats Filippo Inzaghi, Alessandro Nesta, Gennaro Gattuso, and Clarence Seedorf, Ambrosini was reported to be considering his future with the club, but Adriano Galliani was able to convince Massimo to sign yet another one-year deal and continue on to be the captain for Milan for the 2012–13 season. After a very rough start with several notable defeats, Milan eventually finished the season in the third place behind the defending champions Juventus and runners-up Napoli, securing a spot in the next season's Champions League qualification play-off.

On 11 June 2013, Milan CEO Adriano Galliani confirmed that the club had decided not to extend Ambrosini's expiring contract, thus ending his eighteen-year stay at Milan.

=== Fiorentina ===
On 4 July 2013 Fiorentina confirmed on their official website that they had won the race to sign Ambrosini on a one-year deal, beating West Ham United who were also looking to sign him. He made 30 appearances for Fiorentina in his first season with La Viola, helping the club to fourth place in Serie A. Massimo Ambrosini would announce on 21 May 2014 that he would be leaving Fiorentina after one season.

== International career ==
Ambrosini made his senior international debut on 28 April 1999 against Croatia, under manager Dino Zoff, and was part of the Italian squad at UEFA Euro 2000, which ended with an appearance as a substitute in the final loss to reigning World champions France following David Trezeguet's golden goal; he also represented Italy at the 2000 Summer Olympics under Marco Tardelli later that year, where Italy were eliminated in the quarter-finals by eventual finalists Spain. Ambrosini was unavailable for selection for the 2002 FIFA World Cup finals under Giovanni Trapattoni due to injury, and then failed to break into the squad for the UEFA Euro 2004 finals. Under subsequent manager Marcello Lippi, he was also excluded from the national side and was not called up for the 2006 FIFA World Cup, which Italy went on to win.

On 16 August 2006, Ambrosini earned his 23rd cap for Italy after almost two years of absence from the squad in a 2–0 friendly home defeat to Croatia; for this match, he was given the captain's armband by coach Roberto Donadoni in the absence of regular contenders for the armband. He was then called up by the national side's manager to Italy's squad for UEFA Euro 2008 in Austria and Switzerland, appearing in all four of his nation's matches throughout the tournament, as Italy were eliminated in the quarter-finals of the tournament by eventual champions Spain, following a penalty shootout. After Donadoni's dismissal, however, Lippi was put back in charge, and Ambrosini was no longer called up for Italy, despite putting in battling displays for Milan. In total he made 35 appearances for Italy.

== Style of play ==
A physically strong, tenacious, energetic, and hardworking box-to-box, central, or defensive midfielder, with a wide range of skills, Ambrosini was well regarded for his ability in the air, and was capable of being a goal-threat, in particular from set-pieces, due to his height, elevation, ability to make attacking runs into the area, and his heading accuracy, as well as his powerful striking ability from distance, which even led manager Carlo Ancelotti to deploy him as a centre forward on occasion. Throughout his career, he stood out for his leadership, as well as his stamina, versatility, tactical intelligence, and aggressive tackling, which led him to pick up a significant quantity of red and yellow cards throughout his career. Although Ambrosini primarily served as a ball winner, he was also known for his ability to start attacking plays after winning back possession, courtesy of his vision and passing range, despite his lack of notable technical skills. Despite his ability as a midfielder, he often struggled with injuries throughout his career.

== Personal life ==
Massimo Ambrosini is married to an Italian woman, Paola Ambrosini. Ambrosini has two children with his wife, his son Federico Ambrosini was born on 11 May 2009, and his daughter Angelica Ambrosini was born on 21 November 2011.

== Career statistics ==
=== Club ===
Appearances and goals by club, season and competition
Club	Season	League			Cup		Continental		Other		Total	
Club	Season	Division	Apps	Goals	Apps	Goals	Apps	Goals	Apps	Goals	Apps	Goals
Cesena	1994–95	Serie B	25	1	2	0	—		—		27	1
AC Milan	1995–96	Serie A	7	0	4	0	3 (Note: Appearances in UEFA Cup/UEFA Europa League)	0	—		14	0
AC Milan	1996–97	Serie A	11	0	3	0	4 (Note: Appearances in UEFA Champions League)	0	—		18	0
AC Milan	1998–99	Serie A	26	1	3	0	—		—		29	1
AC Milan	1999–2000	Serie A	29	2	4	0	2	0	1 (Note: Appearances in Supercoppa Italiana)	0	36	2
AC Milan	2000–01	Serie A	16	3	3	1	7	0	—		26	4
AC Milan	2001–02	Serie A	9	3	1	0	3	0	—		13	3
AC Milan	2002–03	Serie A	21	1	3	1	13	0	—		37	2
AC Milan	2003–04	Serie A	20	1	3	1	6	0	3 (Note: Appearances in Supercoppa Italiana, UEFA Super Cup, and Intercontinental Cup)	0	32	2
AC Milan	2004–05	Serie A	22	1	4	2	11	1	1	0	38	4
AC Milan	2005–06	Serie A	13	1	1	0	4	0	—		18	1
AC Milan	2006–07	Serie A	19	3	3	0	12	0	—		34	2
AC Milan	2007–08	Serie A	33	4	0	0	7	0	3 (Note: Appearances in FIFA Club World Cup)	0	43	4
AC Milan	2008–09	Serie A	28	7	0	0	5	1	—		33	8
AC Milan	2009–10	Serie A	30	1	1	0	8	0	—		39	1
AC Milan	2010–11	Serie A	18	1	1	0	4	0	—		23	1
AC Milan	2011–12	Serie A	22	1	2	0	6	0	1	0	31	1
AC Milan	2012–13	Serie A	20	0	1	0	4	0	—		25	0
AC Milan	Total		344	30	37	5	99	2	9	0	489	37
Vicenza (loan)	1997–98	Serie A	27	1	1	0	—		6	0	34	1
Fiorentina	2013–14	Serie A	21	0	1	0	8	1	—		30	1
Career total			417	31	41	5	107	3	15	0	580	39

=== International ===
Appearances and goals by national team and year
National team	Year	Apps	Goals
Italy	1999	1	0
Italy	2000	7	0
Italy	2001	0	0
Italy	2002	6	0
Italy	2003	5	0
Italy	2004	3	0
Italy	2005	0	0
Italy	2006	1	0
Italy	2007	6	0
Italy	2008	6	0
Total		35	0

== Honours ==
AC Milan

- Serie A: 1995–96, 1998–99, 2003–04, 2010–11
- Coppa Italia: 2002–03
- Supercoppa Italiana: 2004, 2011
- UEFA Champions League: 2002–03, 2006–07
- UEFA Super Cup: 2003, 2007
- FIFA Club World Cup: 2007

Italy

- UEFA European Championship runner-up: 2000

Individual

- AC Milan Hall of Fame

Orders

5th Class / Knight: Cavaliere Ordine al Merito della Repubblica Italiana: 2000
