= Thomas Helveg =

Danish footballer (born 1971)

Personal information
- Full name: Thomas Lund Helveg
- Date of birth: 24 June 1971 (age 55)
- Place of birth: Odense, Denmark
- Position: Right-back

Team information
- Current team: OB (scout)

Youth career
- Sct. Klemens/Fangel IF
- Dalum IF
- OB

Senior career*
Years	Team	Apps	(Gls)
1989–1994	OB	103	(4)
1994–1998	Udinese	141	(6)
1998–2003	Milan	105	(1)
2003–2004	Internazionale	23	(0)
2004–2005	Norwich City	20	(0)
2005–2007	Borussia Mönchengladbach	13	(0)
2007–2010	OB	75	(0)
Total		480	(10)

International career
1994–2007	Denmark	108	(2)

Managerial career
- 2011–2013: OB (assistant)
- 2020–2021: Denmark U-19 (assistant)
- 2022–2024: OB (resource coach)
- 2024–: OB (scout)
- * Club domestic league appearances and goals

Thomas Lund Helveg (Danish pronunciation: [ˈtsʰʌmæs ˈhelˌve̝ˀj]; born 24 June 1971) is a Danish former professional footballer who played as a right-back. He began and ended his career with OB in the Danish Superliga, with whom he won the 1989 Danish championship. The most prominent periods of his career were five years at Udinese and five years with club AC Milan. With Milan, he won the 1999 Serie A championship and 2003 UEFA Champions League tournament.

Helveg was named 1994 Danish Football Player of the Year, the year he made his debut for the Denmark national team. He has played 108 games and scored two goals for Denmark. He played for Denmark under three different national coaches, and participated in the 1996, 2000 and 2004 European Championship and the 1998 and 2002 FIFA World Cup tournaments. In June 2025, Helveg was inducted into the Danish Football Association Hall of Fame.

== Playing career ==
Born in Odense, Helveg started his senior career at local club OB in the top-flight Danish 1st Division. Helveg played two matches in the last part of OB's 1989 1st Division winning season, and he was soon a part of the OB first team alongside later national team players Allan Nielsen and Brian Steen Nielsen. Helveg represented Denmark at the 1992 Summer Olympics, playing all three Denmark matches in the tournament. When OB played English club Arsenal in the 1993–94 Cup Winners' Cup tournament, Helveg was put to the task of handling English international striker Ian Wright, for which he received praise.

=== Moving abroad ===
Thomas Helveg's international career began when he was loaned out for six months by OB, in November 1993. He joined Italian club Udinese, who were relegation battlers in the Serie A championship. He made his Udinese debut in a 0–0 draw with Atalanta on 28 November 1993, and played 22 games and scored two goals in his first season at the club. Even though Udinese were relegated to the Serie B at the end of the season, he received his first call-up to the Denmark national team by national manager Richard Møller Nielsen in April 1994. He came on as a substitute in the 14th minute for the injured John Jensen, and Helveg would receive rave reviews for his performance, making him a mainstay in the Denmark squad from day one. Despite their relegation, he was bought by Udinese and was soon to have success in the Udine club. Combined with his international breakthrough with the Denmark team, his first year at Udinese earned him the 1994 Danish Player of the Year award.

For five seasons, he was first choice in the right side of the Udinese starting line-up, as a wingback charging up and down the sideline. He played 30 of 38 games, as Udinese finished second in the 1994–95 Serie B season, and won promotion back into the Serie A after a single season in Serie B. Under guidance of coach Alberto Zaccheroni, Udinese steadily became a tough opponent for the other clubs in Serie A, and finished in tenth place of the 1995–96 Serie A season. Helveg scored his first national team goal in June 1996, before representing Denmark in his first major international tournament at the 1996 European Championship (Euro 1996) later that month. He played all three Denmark matches in the preliminary group stage of the Euro 1996, which ended unsuccessfully in an early exit from the tournament.

In April 1997, he was joined at Udinese by fellow Danish player Martin Jørgensen. The pair developed a close relationship, naming each other nephew Jørgensen and uncle Helveg. For the next two seasons, Udinese mingled with the biggest Serie A clubs, the "Seven Sisters". Helveg played 30 of 34 games as Udinese finished in fifth place of the 1996–97 Serie A season, and qualified for European football for the first time in club history. In the following season, Helveg played four games for Udinese in the European UEFA Cup tournament, and helped the club finish in a meriting third place of the 1997–98 Serie A season. Both Helveg and Martin Jørgensen were included in new national manager Bo Johansson's Danish squad for the 1998 FIFA World Cup. Their connection was evident in their joint celebration following Helveg's goal in Denmark's 4–1 win over Nigeria in the World Cup round of 16.

=== Milan ===
Before the 1998 World Cup, Helveg had been sold to AC Milan, alongside his Udinese teammate Oliver Bierhoff. The transfer deal made Helveg the most expensive Danish player at the time, at the price of £6 million. The shift from Udinese to AC Milan was made easier, when Milan later signed manager Alberto Zaccheroni from the Udinese days. The trio gained success in Milan, as the club won the Italian championship, Lo Scudetto, in 1998–99. Thomas Helveg played a large role in the success as a starter in almost every game in the season. In the next two seasons, he was still first choice, but in the season 2001–02 he began to be challenged severely by the young Italian players like Gennaro Gattuso and Massimo Ambrosini. He scored his first goal for the club on 6 December 2000; the only goal in a 1–0 win at Deportivo de La Coruña in the UEFA Champions League.

In the 2001–02 season, he played less than half of Milan's games in Serie A, and following only eight of 34 matches in the 2002–03 season, he moved to Inter Milan – the cross-city rivals of AC Milan – before the season 2003–04. Through his five years at AC Milan, Helveg had been selected for Denmark in both the Euro 2000 as well as 2002 FIFA World Cup. While the Euro 2000 was no success for neither Denmark nor Helveg, who had an injury which limited him to playing a combined 98 minutes in two games, the 2002 World Cup gave him more time on the pitch. He played full-time in the three successful group stage matches, until another injury forced him to leave the pitch in the seventh minute of Denmark's final game before elimination.

=== Veteran years ===
In Inter Milan, he rejoined his former manager in both Udinese and AC Milan, Alberto Zaccheroni. Helveg regained some of his form and played 22 games in Serie A and six matches in the European cups. In this his last year in Italy, he was from time to time also used in the left side of the defence. He was once more a part of a European Championship tournament, when he played full-time in Denmark's four games at the Euro 2004. Helveg was named national team captain following the retirement of René Henriksen after the Euro 2004 tournament. After a year at Inter Milan, Helveg moved on to play in England in the summer 2004.

He joined Norwich City on a free transfer. Norwich had been promoted to the English FA Premier League and saw Helveg as a signing who would bring class and experience to the side. His signing was seen as something of a coup for Norwich, but Helveg struggled to reproduce the form shown in Serie A and on the international scene, and he lost his place in the starting line-up in the opening weeks of the season. After a long absence, partly due to injury, he regained his place in the side in early 2005, this time in central midfield. He finished the season, in typically versatile fashion, as the first choice right back. After a largely disappointing season, Norwich was relegated. Helveg left the club, having shown only flashes of his former class.

Helveg signed a two-year contract with German club Borussia Mönchengladbach in the Bundesliga championship. Four appearances into his Mönchengladbach debut season, he sustained a serious achilles tendon injury that forced him out for more than eight months. He returned to Bundesliga action at the end of that season, coming on as a substitute in injury-time in Mönchengladbach's final match. Having played eight of Mönchengladbach's first 19 games during the 2006–07 season, Helveg was dropped from the Danish national team by national manager Morten Olsen. Helveg and Mönchengladbach mutually terminated his contract in January 2007, and he moved back to play for OB.

On 4 December 2010, Helveg played the last match of his career.

== Later and coaching career ==
After retiring at the end of 2010, it was confirmed on 17 December 2010, that Helveg from 1 January 2011 would continue at OB as an assistant coach under Henrik Clausen. Clausen was fired on 26 March 2012, but Helveg continued in his position under newly hired manager Poul Hansen. At his own request, Helveg chose to resign from his position in June 2013.

In August 2015, Helveg was back in football when he was hired as a member of Roskilde's board. It is unknown how long Helveg held this position.

On 28 May 2020, Helveg was appointed assistant coach of Denmark's U-19 national team. He left the position in August 2021. In October 2022, Helveg returned to OB, where he was hired as a 'resource coach'. Helveg's new position included helping with the integration of new players. In June 2024, Helveg was given a new role at OB, as he was to act as a scout for the first team.

== Career statistics ==
=== Club ===
Appearances and goals by club, season and competition
Club	Season	League		Cup		Continental		Other		Total	
Club	Season	Apps	Goals	Apps	Goals	Apps	Goals	Apps	Goals	Apps	Goals
OB	1989	2	1			–	–	–	–	2	1
OB	1990	19	2			2	0	–	–	21	2
OB	1991	17	0			–	–	–	–	17	0
OB	1991–92	21	0			1	0	–	–	22	0
OB	1992–93	31	1			–	–	–	–	31	1
OB	1993–94	13	0			–	–	–	–	13	0
OB	Total	103	4			3	0	0	0	106	4
Udinese	1993–94	22	2	2	0	–	–	–	–	24	2
Udinese	1994–95	30	1	2	0	–	–	–	–	32	1
Udinese	1995–96	31	2	1	0	–	–	–	–	32	2
Udinese	1996–97	30	1	0	0	–	–	–	–	30	1
Udinese	1997–98	28	0	2	0	4	0	–	–	34	0
Udinese	Total	141	6	7	0	4	0	0	0	152	6
AC Milan	1998–99	27	0	4	1	–	–	–	–	31	1
AC Milan	1999–00	27	0	1	0	4	0	–	–	32	0
AC Milan	2000–01	28	0	5	0	9	1	–	–	42	1
AC Milan	2001–02	15	0	4	0	5	0	–	–	24	0
AC Milan	2002–03	8	0	7	0	2	0	–	–	17	0
AC Milan	Total	105	0	21	1	20	1	0	0	146	2
Inter Milan	2003–04	23	0	3	0	6	0	–	–	32	0
Norwich	2004–05	20	0	1	0	–	–	2	0	23	0
Borussia Mönchengladbach	2005–06	5	0	0	0	–	–	–	–	5	0
Borussia Mönchengladbach	2006–07	8	0	2	0	–	–	–	–	10	0
Borussia Mönchengladbach	Total	13	0	2	0	0	0	0	0	15	0
OB	2006–07	3	0			–	–	–	–	3	0
OB	2007–08	17	0			–	–	–	–	17	0
OB	2008–09	30	0			2	0	–	–	32	0
OB	2009–10	7	0			–	–	–	–	7	0
OB	Total	57	0			2	0	0	0	59	0
Career total		462	10	34	1	35	1	2	0	533	12

=== International ===
Scores and results list Denmark's goal tally first, score column indicates score after each Helveg goal.

List of international goals scored by Thomas Helveg
No.	Date	Venue	Opponent	Score	Result	Competition
1	2 June 1996	Copenhagen, Denmark	Ghana	1–0	1–0	Friendly match
2	28 June 1998	Saint-Denis, France	Nigeria	4–0	4–1	1998 FIFA World Cup

== Honours ==
OB

- Danish 1st Division: 1989
- Danish Cup: 1990–91, 1992–93, 2006–07

AC Milan

- Serie A: 1998–99
- Coppa Italia: 2002–03
- UEFA Champions League: 2002–03

Individual

- Danish Player of the Year: 1994

== See also ==
- List of men's footballers with 100 or more international caps

== Literature ==
- Aagaard, Jørgen (2001). Thomas Helveg – født til at løbe [Thomas Helveg – born to run] (in Danish). Denmark. ISBN 87-7831-249-3.
