= Alberto Zaccheroni =

Italian association football player (born 1953)

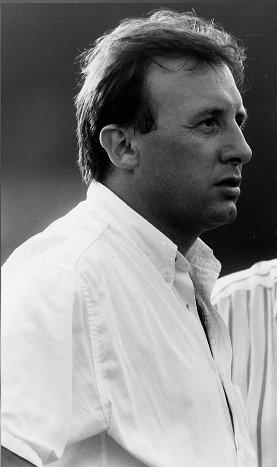

Personal information
- Date of birth: 1 April 1953 (age 73)
- Place of birth: Meldola, Italy
- Height: 1.70 m (5 ft 7 in)
- Position: Full-back

Managerial career
- Years: Team
- 1983–1985: Cesenatico
- 1985–1987: Riccione
- 1987–1988: Boca San Lazzaro
- 1988–1990: Baracca Lugo
- 1990–1993: Venezia
- 1993–1994: Bologna
- 1994–1995: Cosenza
- 1995–1998: Udinese
- 1998–2001: AC Milan
- 2001–2002: Lazio
- 2003–2004: Inter Milan
- 2006–2007: Torino
- 2010: Juventus
- 2010–2014: Japan
- 2016: Beijing Guoan
- 2017–2019: United Arab Emirates
Medal record
Men's football
Representing Japan (as manager)
AFC Asian Cup
| Winner | 2011 |
EAFF Championship
| Winner | 2013 |

Alberto Zaccheroni (Italian pronunciation: [alˈbɛrto ddzakkeˈroːni]; born 1 April 1953) is an Italian former football manager, formerly in charge of the United Arab Emirates and Japan national football teams.

He has managed a number of top clubs in Serie A, the high point of his career being his stint as manager of AC Milan (1998–2001), with whom he won a scudetto, in his first season in charge (1998–99). Other notable clubs coached by Zaccheroni include Lazio, Inter Milan and Juventus, all as interim coach for part of a season. He won the Asian Cup in 2011 as manager of Japan. Zaccheroni is also renowned for his unconventional and trademark 3–4–3 tactical system.

== Career ==
Zaccheroni played as a full-back on both the left and the right wing, without much success, and his playing career was cut short by injury. He therefore became a manager at the relatively young age of 30 with amateur club Cesenatico. He won the Serie C2 and Serie C1, the fourth and the third highest football leagues in Italy. His managerial career took off when he was in charge of Udinese.

=== Udinese ===
Zaccheroni was appointed manager of Udinese in 1995. The 1996–97 season saw Udinese qualify for the UEFA Cup. In the following season, they managed a third-place finish behind champions Juventus and runners-up Inter Milan, largely thanks to Oliver Bierhoff's 27 goals.

=== AC Milan ===
Zaccheroni's results at Udinese attracted the attention of Silvio Berlusconi, owner of Italian giants AC Milan, who appointed him as manager after the club had endured two miserable seasons, despite their expensive, star-studded squad featuring (George Weah, Leonardo, Paolo Maldini etc.). Zaccheroni asked Berlusconi to sign two key players from Udinese to accompany him to Milan: German striker Oliver Bierhoff and Danish right wing-back Thomas Helveg. Berlusconi obliged, and both players joined Zaccheroni at his new club.

Zaccheroni delivered instantly, as Milan conquered the Serie A in his first season in charge, overcoming Lazio and Fiorentina to the title, after seven straight wins in the last seven matches, with Zaccheroni employing an attacking 3–4–3 (or 3–4–1–2) formation that made good use of Milan's forwards, attacking midfielders and wing-backs.

The following season was less successful for Zaccheroni as Milan crashed out of the Champions League early, and, despite finishing third in Serie A, were never really in the running for the title. The 2000–01 season was even worse for Zaccheroni and would be his last in charge, as Milan had a poor run in the Serie A, at one time finding themselves barely above the relegation zone (eventually they finished 6th); in the Champions League they had a good start in the First Group Stage, topping their group (which included Barcelona, Leeds United and Beşiktaş), but were eventually eliminated in the Second Group Stage. As the Champions League final was about to take place at the San Siro, the backlash was immense, and this led Berlusconi to sack Zaccheroni and replace him with caretaker manager Cesare Maldini on 14 March 2001, one day after Milan's elimination from the Champions League.

As manager of Milan, Zaccheroni was successful and prescient in some of his signings; Oliver Bierhoff, Kakha Kaladze, Gennaro Gattuso and, above all, Andriy Shevchenko would become key players for the club. On the other hand, however, transfers like those of José Mari were expensive flops, and he was also criticised for letting top centre-back Roberto Ayala leave Milan and move to Valencia; Ayala was generally unhappy in his two seasons at Milan (making 13 appearances in 1998–99 and 22 in 1999–2000) as there was stiff competition in defence with established players like Paolo Maldini and Alessandro Costacurta.

=== Lazio ===
Zaccheroni was without a job for a few months before Lazio came calling, after Dino Zoff had resigned. The Rome-based club had endured a terrible start to the 2001–02 season. He changed things around and managed to finish 6th in Serie A, thus earning Lazio a place in the UEFA Cup. Zaccheroni was not without his critics, though, as he played Gaizka Mendieta and Stefano Fiore out of position, thus failing to get the best out of them. He was also held responsible by many for the humiliating 5–1 loss to Roma in the Rome derby that season. Despite Zaccheroni's efforts, he parted company with Lazio, to be replaced by Roberto Mancini.

=== Inter Milan ===
Zaccheroni was again called upon in the mid-season of 2003–04, this time to try to save Inter Milan after the departure of coach Héctor Cúper from the club. Despite crashing out of the Champions League after a humiliating 5–1 loss to Arsenal at the San Siro, he managed to lift Inter to fourth place in Serie A, thus securing qualification to the Champions League for next season. However, Inter president Massimo Moratti was not convinced of Zaccheroni's abilities, and he was again replaced by Roberto Mancini.

=== Torino ===
After two seasons without a job, he was linked with a move to England in the vacant manager's post at Crystal Palace. These rumors never came to fruition. He did, however, become the new head coach of Torino on 7 September 2006, the 100th anniversary of the team, replacing Gianni De Biasi, fired by chairman Urbano Cairo three days before the start of the new season despite having led the team to instant promotion from Serie B. However, despite a good start, Zaccheroni was not able to bring Torino to the top positions in the league table and even suffered a worrying sequence of six consecutive defeats, which led chairman Cairo to sack him on 26 February 2007, and reinstate De Biasi at the helm of the granata.

=== Juventus ===
On 29 January 2010 he was appointed to replace Ciro Ferrara as head coach of under-crisis Juventus. He signed a four-month contract. On 14 February 2010, Zaccheroni achieved his first win as a Juventus manager, defeating Genoa 3–2. His first loss in charge of the team arrived two weeks later, a 0–2 home defeat to Palermo.

He also guided Juventus through the newly established UEFA Europa League campaign, after the club failed to qualify to the first knockout round of the UEFA Champions League. In his first game at European level with Juventus, his side defeated 2–1 Ajax in Amsterdam (the return leg then ended 0–0), and then went on to play English opponents Fulham. The first leg ended in a 3–1 win, but in Craven Cottage his side suffered a 4–1 defeat, sending Juventus out of the competition on a 5–4 aggregate scoreline. After a good start, results fell down again, similarly to the way they did during Ferrara's tenure, and Juventus ended the season in seventh place, thus concluding what was remembered as one of the most troubled Serie A seasons for the bianconeri.

=== Japan ===
On 30 August 2010, it was revealed via an announcement from the Japan Football Association that Zaccheroni would become the new manager of the Japan national football team. However, due to a visa problem, he was not able to take charge in the first two matches against Paraguay (1–0) and Guatemala (2–1), in which former Japan striker and JFA technical director Hiromi Hara took charge. The first match he took charge, Japan had a historic 1–0 win over Argentina.

His first major competition with Japan was the 2011 AFC Asian Cup, hosted in Qatar. He led the team to their record fourth Asian Cup title, winning 1–0 in the final against Australia.

He led Japan to become the first nation to qualify for the World Cup finals in Brazil after their 2014 FIFA World Cup qualifying football match against Australia in Saitama on 4 June 2013. Japan opened their campaign at the World Cup with a 2–1 defeat to Ivory Coast, where they led the match until 64 minutes. In the next match, Japan faced Greece, which ended 0–0. They were eliminated in the group stages after a 4–1 defeat to Colombia and finished fourth with one point. At the end of the tournament, Zaccheroni resigned as the manager of Japan.

=== Beijing Guoan ===
On 19 January 2016, Zaccheroni was appointed manager of Chinese Super League club Beijing Guoan on a two-year contract. But after a dismal start to the season in which Guoan picked up just nine points in their first nine games of the season, combined with the team scoring just seven goals in their first nine games and growing discontent among fans, Zaccheroni was fired.

=== United Arab Emirates ===
On 16 October 2017, Zaccheroni took over the United Arab Emirates national football team. The team in January 2018 finished as the runner-up in the 23rd Gulf Cup. In January 2019, Zaccheroni led the national team to the semi-final of the Asian Cup which was hosted by the United Arab Emirates. After the 4–0 defeat against Qatar in semi-final, Zaccheroni left his position as UAE head coach as his contract with the UAE was set to expire at the end of the 2019 AFC Asian Cup.

=== Italian Non Profit National Team ===
Since April 2022 he is the technical commissioner of the "Italian Non Profit National Team", a Third Sector Entity (ETS) that promotes the values of solidarity through the sharing of a sporting experience involving non-profit associations.

=== FIFA ===
In 2022, he became a member of FIFA's Technical Study Group (TSG) during the World Cup in Qatar.

== Style of management ==
Zaccheroni was known for employing an innovative attacking 3–4–3 (or 3–4–1–2 system, with an attacking midfielder supporting the forwards) formation, which was unconventional for the time. His system made use of a back-three and wing-backs in lieu of wide midfielders, who would make attacking runs up the flank, looking to provide crosses to the team's centre-forward, rather than tracking back. In his early career, he initially used a 4–4–2 formation with a zonal defence, inspired by Arrigo Sacchi's similar tactical system at Milan, which was widely used in Italy during the 1990s, although he did not emulate Sacchi's use of the offside trap. Zaccheroni's direct game-play sought to bring the forwards into play as quickly as possible, through long balls from the back. He made use of an attacking trident with inverted wingers who were known for their quick combination play, or ability to provide depth to the team with their runs off the ball, and cut inside either to score goals or create chances. Unlike Ajax's diamond midfield under Louis van Gaal in the 1990s, Zaccheroni used a flat midfield line in his trademark 3–4–3 formation. Off the ball, his team made use of pressing.

== Personal life ==
In February 2023, it was reported that Zaccheroni was being treated for a head injury.

== Managerial statistics ==
As of match played 29 January 2019

Managerial record by team and tenure
| Team | From | To | Record | | | | |
| Team | From | To | G | W | D | L | Win % |
|---|---|---|---|---|---|---|---|
| Lugo | 1 July 1988 | 30 June 1990 | 34 | 15 | 15 | 4 | 44.12 |
| Venezia FC | 1 July 1990 | 20 January 1992 | 58 | 18 | 26 | 14 | 31.03 |
| Venezia | 30 March 1992 | 22 February 1993 | 38 | 13 | 15 | 10 | 34.21 |
| Venezia | 11 April 1993 | 30 June 1993 | 9 | 0 | 4 | 5 | 0.00 |
| Bologna | 1 July 1993 | 29 November 1993 | 13 | 4 | 4 | 5 | 30.77 |
| Cosenza | 1 July 1994 | 30 June 1995 | 39 | 11 | 18 | 10 | 28.21 |
| Udinese | 1 July 1995 | 30 June 1998 | 113 | 50 | 25 | 38 | 44.25 |
| AC Milan | 1 July 1998 | 12 March 2001 | 125 | 54 | 44 | 27 | 43.20 |
| Lazio | 1 October 2001 | 30 June 2002 | 46 | 19 | 11 | 16 | 41.30 |
| Inter Milan | 20 October 2003 | 30 June 2004 | 44 | 18 | 14 | 12 | 40.91 |
| Torino | 7 September 2006 | 26 February 2007 | 24 | 5 | 7 | 12 | 20.83 |
| Juventus | 29 January 2010 | 19 May 2010 | 21 | 8 | 5 | 8 | 38.10 |
| Japan | 10 September 2010 | 30 June 2014 | 55 | 30 | 12 | 13 | 54.55 |
| Beijing Guoan | 15 January 2016 | 20 May 2016 | 10 | 3 | 3 | 4 | 30.00 |
| United Arab Emirates | 16 October 2017 | 30 January 2019 | 23 | 7 | 8 | 8 | 30.43 |
| Career total | | | 652 | 255 | 211 | 186 | 39.11 |

== Honours ==
Riccione

- Campionato Interregionale: 1986–87

Baracca Lugo

- Campionato Interregionale: 1988–89
- Serie C2: 1989–90

Venezia

- Serie C1: 1990–91

AC Milan

- Serie A: 1998–99

Japan

- AFC Asian Cup: 2011
- EAFF East Asian Cup: 2013

Individual

- Albo Panchina d'Oro: 1996–97, 1998–99
- Serie A Coach of the Year: 1999
- Japan Football Hall of Fame: Inducted in 2024
