= Carlo Teodorani =

Italian footballer (born 1977)

Personal information
- Date of birth: 12 April 1977 (age 49)
- Place of birth: Savignano sul Rubicone, Italy
- Height: 1.85 m (6 ft 1 in)
- Position: Defender

Youth career
- Cesena

Senior career*
Years	Team	Apps	(Gls)
1997–1999	Cesena	29	(2)
1999–2001	Milan	0	(0)
1999–2001	→ Ternana (loan)	29	(1)
2001–2007	Verona	115	(0)
2005	→ Reggiana (loan)	13	(0)
- * Club domestic league appearances and goals

Carlo Teodorani (born 12 April 1977) is an Italian former footballer who played as a defender.

== Career ==
Teodorani joined Milan along with Mattia Graffiedi in 1999 in a co-ownership deal, with Marcello Campolonghi moving in the opposite direction. In June 2000 the co-ownership deal was terminated. In January 2001 Teodorani moved to Hellas Verona F.C. for 3,000 million lire (€1,549,371) in another co-ownership deal which was terminated in June 2001 for an additional 1,400 million lire (€723,040). (Note: Verona disclosed a lump sum financial income due to a co-ownership discount of 4,000 million lire in its report. (1,600 million lire (€826,331) from Teodorani and 2,400 million lire (€1,239,497) from Mutu.) Milan disclosed that a co-ownership financial cost of €826,000 (rounded to nearest thousand) in its report.)
