= 1989 Danish 1st Division =

44th season of Danish 1st Division

Danish 1st Division
- Season: 1989

The 1989 Danish 1st Division season was the 44th season of the Danish 1st Division league championship, governed by the Danish Football Association.

The Danish champions qualified for the European Cup 1990-91 qualification, while the second and third placed teams qualified for the qualification round of the UEFA Cup 1990-91. The two lowest placed teams of the tournament was directly relegated to the Danish 2nd Division. Likewise, the Danish 2nd Division champions and runners-up were promoted to the 1st Division.

== Table ==
Pos	Team	Pld	W	D	L	GF	GA	GD	Pts
1	Odense BK	26	17	7	2	45	19	+26	41
2	Brøndby IF	26	17	4	5	52	26	+26	38
3	Lyngby BK	26	15	8	3	48	24	+24	38
4	Vejle BK	26	14	6	6	45	27	+18	34
5	Aarhus GF	26	10	13	3	39	22	+17	33
6	B 1903	26	8	11	7	33	28	+5	27
7	Silkeborg IF	26	7	11	8	31	29	+2	25
8	BK Frem	26	9	5	12	34	38	−4	23
9	Næstved IF	26	8	7	11	35	40	−5	23
10	Ikast FS	26	6	9	11	28	43	−15	21
11	Aalborg BK	26	5	9	12	30	39	−9	19
12	Herfølge BK	26	5	6	15	17	45	−28	16
13	B 1913	26	4	5	17	25	52	−27	13
14	Brønshøj BK	26	4	5	17	26	56	−30	13

== Results ==
Home \ Away	AaB	AGF	B03	B13	BIF	BBK	BKF	HBK	IFS	LBK	NIF	OB	SIF	VBK
Aalborg BK	—	1–1	1–1	0–1	2–0	1–3	1–1	1–0	1–1	0–0	2–0	3–3	1–1	2–2
Aarhus GF	1–0	—	2–2	4–0	1–2	1–1	2–0	0–0	1–1	1–1	1–0	0–0	0–0	2–2
B 1903	2–1	0–2	—	3–1	0–1	2–0	0–3	2–0	1–1	0–0	0–3	0–0	3–2	3–1
B 1913	1–2	0–2	0–0	—	1–3	3–1	0–2	0–1	4–2	1–3	1–1	0–1	0–0	1–2
Brøndby IF	2–0	3–1	1–1	4–0	—	4–1	4–1	3–0	2–1	2–2	2–1	0–2	3–2	2–0
Brønshøj BK	3–1	1–1	0–4	3–2	0–3	—	2–4	1–1	0–1	0–1	0–1	1–2	1–2	0–1
BK Frem	2–2	0–3	1–1	2–1	1–2	2–2	—	3–0	3–2	1–4	2–1	1–2	2–1	1–0
Herfølge BK	0–2	1–4	0–3	1–1	1–0	1–1	1–0	—	2–2	1–2	2–0	0–1	0–2	0–3
Ikast FS	2–1	0–2	2–2	1–1	0–0	1–3	1–0	2–1	—	0–1	3–1	0–0	1–1	0–2
Lyngby BK	2–0	3–5	1–0	2–0	4–0	2–0	1–0	4–0	3–1	—	3–1	0–2	2–3	2–1
Næstved IF	5–4	1–1	2–1	4–0	1–4	1–0	0–0	2–2	3–0	1–1	—	1–3	1–1	1–2
Odense BK	2–0	2–0	1–1	4–1	0–4	3–1	2–1	3–0	3–0	1–1	1–2	—	3–0	1–0
Silkeborg IF	1–0	0–0	1–1	1–3	1–1	5–1	1–0	0–1	1–2	1–1	3–0	1–1	—	0–1
Vejle BK	2–1	1–1	1–0	3–2	2–0	6–0	2–1	3–1	4–1	2–2	1–1	1–2	0–0	—

Legend: Blue = home team win; Yellow = draw; Red = away team win.

== Top goalscorers ==
Position	Player	Club	Goals
1	Miklos Molnar	BK Frem	14
-	Flemming Christensen	Lyngby BK	14
-	Lars Jacobsen	Odense BK	14
