= Dražen Brnčić =

Croatian football manager and former player

Personal information
- Date of birth: 17 July 1971 (age 55)
- Place of birth: Zagreb, SR Croatia, SFR Yugoslavia
- Height: 1.80 m (5 ft 11 in)
- Position: Central midfielder

Team information
- Current team: Virton (manager)

Youth career
- 1989–1991: HNK Segesta
- 1991–?: Dinamo Zagreb

Senior career*
Years	Team	Apps	(Gls)
1994–1995	ACHE		
1995–1998	Charleroi	74	(10)
1998–1999	Cremonese	22	(2)
1999–2000	Monza	37	(9)
2000–2001	Milan	1	(0)
2001	→ Vicenza (loan)	4	(0)
2001–2003	Internazionale	0	(0)
2001–2002	→ Ancona (loan)	2	(0)
2002–2003	→ Venezia (loan)	28	(1)
2003–2007	MVV	100	(21)
2007–2009	Visé		
2009–2010	Seraing		
Total		268	(43)

Managerial career
- 2012–2014: Verviers
- 2014–2015: Union St-Gilloise
- 2015: Patro Eisden Maasmechelen
- 2016: Seraing
- 2016–2019: RWDM
- 2020–2022: RFC Liège
- 2023–2026: Tubize-Braine
- 2026–: Virton
- * Club domestic league appearances and goals

Dražen Brnčić (born 17 July 1971) is a Croatian football manager and former player who played as a midfielder. He is the manager of Challenger Pro League club Virton in Belgium.

== Playing career ==
Brnčić started his youth career in SR Croatia but left for Belgium after Croatia declared its independence.

He joined a local side ACHE (Hemptinne-Eghezée) for a year before transferring to Charleroi, where he played regularly in the Belgian First Division and spotted by European teams. He eventually transferred to Serie B side Cremonese, before moving to Lombardy to join Monza. He played 37 Serie B matches for Monza as they were relegated; the next season, he was loaned to Serie B club Vicenza and won promotion to Serie A.

In the 2000–01 season he joined A.C. Milan, but only played one league matches, three Coppa Italia matches and one Champions League match due to injuries.

Before the start of the following season, he was signed by Internazionale as part of the transfer that saw Andrea Pirlo move to Milan. He never played for Inter and spent his two years at the club on loan to Serie B sides Ancona and Venezia.

In June 2003, he was released by Inter and went on trial at Vitesse Arnhem before joining MVV in the Eerste Divisie.

In 2007, he joined Belgian Third Division team Visé, where he played as a defender and scored 4 goals.

== Managerial career ==
In 2012, he became the trainer of RSC Verviers (Belgium third division) for 4 month to maintain club in third division.

In the 2013–14 season with RSC Vervier, he finished in second place. Because of the club did not receive the division 2 license, the team could not play the final round to be promoted in second division.

In the 2014–15 season, he was the trainer of Union St-Gilloise (Belgium third division). He did fantastic work and his team was promoted to the second division.

For the 2015 season, he was the trainer of Patro Maasmechelen (Belgium second division). He decided to stop after 4 months because the club had no ambition.

Now, he is the trainer of Seraing United (Belgium second division).

In November 2016 he took the lead of the fresh reborn RWDM the traditional football club of Molenbeek. Under Brnčić's leadership, the club clinched two titles in a row (2017 and 2018) and climbed from level 5 to level 3 of Belgian football.

In November 2023, Brnčić took charge of RUTB.

On 30 June 2026, Brnčić was appointed head coach of Virton, recently promoted into the second-tier Challenger Pro League.

== Personal life ==
Brnčić married a Belgian woman and received Belgian nationality.
