= Diego De Ascentis =

Italian footballer (born 1976)

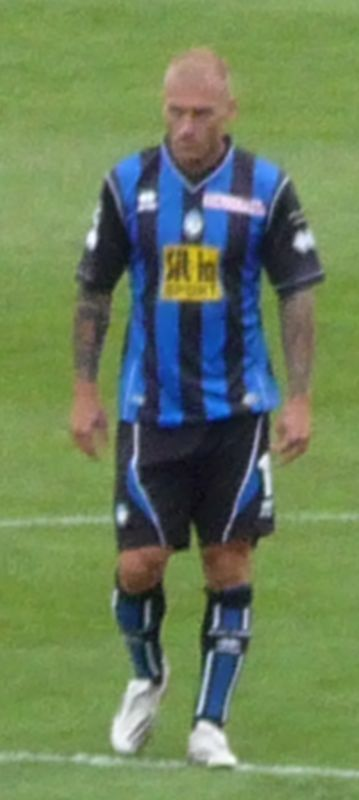

Personal information
- Date of birth: 31 July 1976 (age 50)
- Place of birth: Como, Italy
- Height: 1.78 m (5 ft 10 in)
- Position: Midfielder

Youth career
- 1993–1995: Como

Senior career*
Years	Team	Apps	(Gls)
1995–1996	Como	31	(1)
1996–1999	Bari	86	(3)
1999–2000	Milan	19	(0)
2000–2005	Torino	167	(2)
2005–2006	Livorno	29	(1)
2006–2007	Torino	30	(0)
2007–2010	Atalanta	65	(1)
Total		428	(8)

International career
1997	Italy U21	5	(0)
1997	Italy Olympic	4	(0)
- * Club domestic league appearances and goals

Diego De Ascentis (born 31 July 1976) is an Italian former footballer who played as a midfielder.

== Club career ==
De Ascentis started his career at Como in 1993 before moving to Bari in 1996. Three years later, he transferred to AC Milan for a season.

In 2000, he transferred to Torino. After Torino went bankrupt in 2005 he moved to Genoa, joining the club in July 2005; however, Genoa was demoted to Serie C1 later that month as punishment for match-fixing, prompting De Ascentis to transfer to Livorno. After the reformed Torino regained promotion to Serie A, he rejoined the Turin club for another season.

He signed a three-year contract with Atalanta in the summer of 2007 and was released in the summer of 2009. He re-signed with the club on 8 October that year, and departed again at the end of the 2009–10 season.

== International career ==
De Ascentis was capped for the Italy Under-21 and Olympic teams (the former of which won the 1997 Mediterranean Games).
