= Marcello Campolonghi =

Italian footballer

Personal information
- Date of birth: 15 February 1975 (age 51)
- Place of birth: Piacenza, Italy
- Height: 1.80 m (5 ft 11 in)
- Position: Striker

Senior career*
Years	Team	Apps	(Gls)
1992–1993	Piacenza	0	(0)
1993–1994	Fidenza	29	(7)
1994–1995	Maceratese	29	(8)
1995–1997	Brescia	42	(7)
1997–1999	Milan	0	(0)
1997–1998	→ Monza (loan)	44	(8)
1999	→ Lecce (loan)	16	(2)
1999–2000	Cesena	39	(11)
2000–2002	Siena	51	(7)
2003	Crotone	14	(2)
2003–2004	Reggiana	26	(6)
2004	Como	11	(5)
2005	Cremonese	19	(5)
2005–2008	Pizzighettone	88	(24)
2008–2009	Pavia	23	(6)
2009–2010	Pizzighettone	18	(6)

International career
1997	Italy U-23	1	(0)
- * Club domestic league appearances and goals

Marcello Campolonghi (born 15 February 1975) is an Italian former footballer who played as a forward.

Throughout his career he played for several teams in the Italian Serie B.
