= Mattia Graffiedi =

Italian footballer

Personal information
- Date of birth: 26 May 1980 (age 46)
- Place of birth: Cesenatico, Italy
- Height: 1.80 m (5 ft 11 in)
- Position: Forward

Youth career
- Cesena

Senior career*
Years	Team	Apps	(Gls)
1998–1999	Cesena	15	(4)
1999–2006	A.C. Milan	0	(0)
2000–2001	→ Ternana (loan)	0	(0)
2001	→ Cesena (loan)	16	(1)
2001–2002	→ Napoli (loan)	25	(3)
2002–2003	→ Ancona (loan)	37	(9)
2003–2004	→ Fiorentina (loan)	40	(8)
2004–2005	→ Siena (loan)	13	(0)
2005–2006	→ Modena (loan)	44	(10)
2006–2008	Triestina	45	(3)
2008	→ Grosseto (loan)	21	(6)
2008–2011	Piacenza	63	(11)
2011–2012	Gubbio	23	(6)
2012–2013	Cesena	21	(3)
2013–2014	San Marino	6	(0)
- * Club domestic league appearances and goals

Mattia Graffiedi (born 26 May 1980) is an Italian former footballer who played as a forward.

He first played for Cesena, later moving on to more prestigious clubs such as A.C. Milan. However, most of his career has been spent at teams in Serie B.

== Career ==
=== Cesena ===
Graffiedi started his career at Cesena near to his born place.

=== Milan ===
He was signed by A.C. Milan in summer 1999 in co-ownership deal, for 7,250 million lire (€3,744,313). (Graffiedi and Carlo Teodorani to Milan and Marcello Campolonghi to Cesena), but left on loan since graduating from their youth team in summer 2000. He enjoyed his best seasons for Ancona and Fiorentina in Serie B, earning himself a move to Serie A team A.C. Siena. In June 2003 Milan bought Graffiedi outright for another €750,000.

He made his debut against U.C. Sampdoria on 19 September 2004. After the first time did not scored for the club, he was left to Serie B again for Modena F.C. in January 2005, became his first club that served for more than one year (1 1/2 years).

=== Triestina ===
In summer 2006, he was signed by Triestina in co-ownership deal, for €300,000. Again, he did not manage to score in 2007–08 season, and sent on loan to Grosseto in mid-season, where the club searching a striker to boost their by-then infamous record of the lowest number of goals of the league.

In June 2008, Triestina finally own the full registration rights of the player for a peppercorn fee of €1,000. However, he was transferred to Piacenza for undisclosed fee, which Triestina had a profit of €150,000.

=== Piacenza ===
Piacenza became his longest serving club, for only 3 seasons. The club was struggling in Italian Serie B and the club finally relegated in 2011.

=== Late career ===
In October 2011 Graffiedi was signed by A.S. Gubbio 1910 as free agent. On 31 July 2012 Graffiedi was signed by Serie B club A.C. Cesena in 1-year contract. He had an anterior cruciate ligament injury in May 2013.

On 10 September 2013 he was signed by San Marino Calcio, re-joining Cesena teammate Gianluigi Bamonte as well as several youth player.
