= Alberto Savino =

Italian footballer (born 1973)

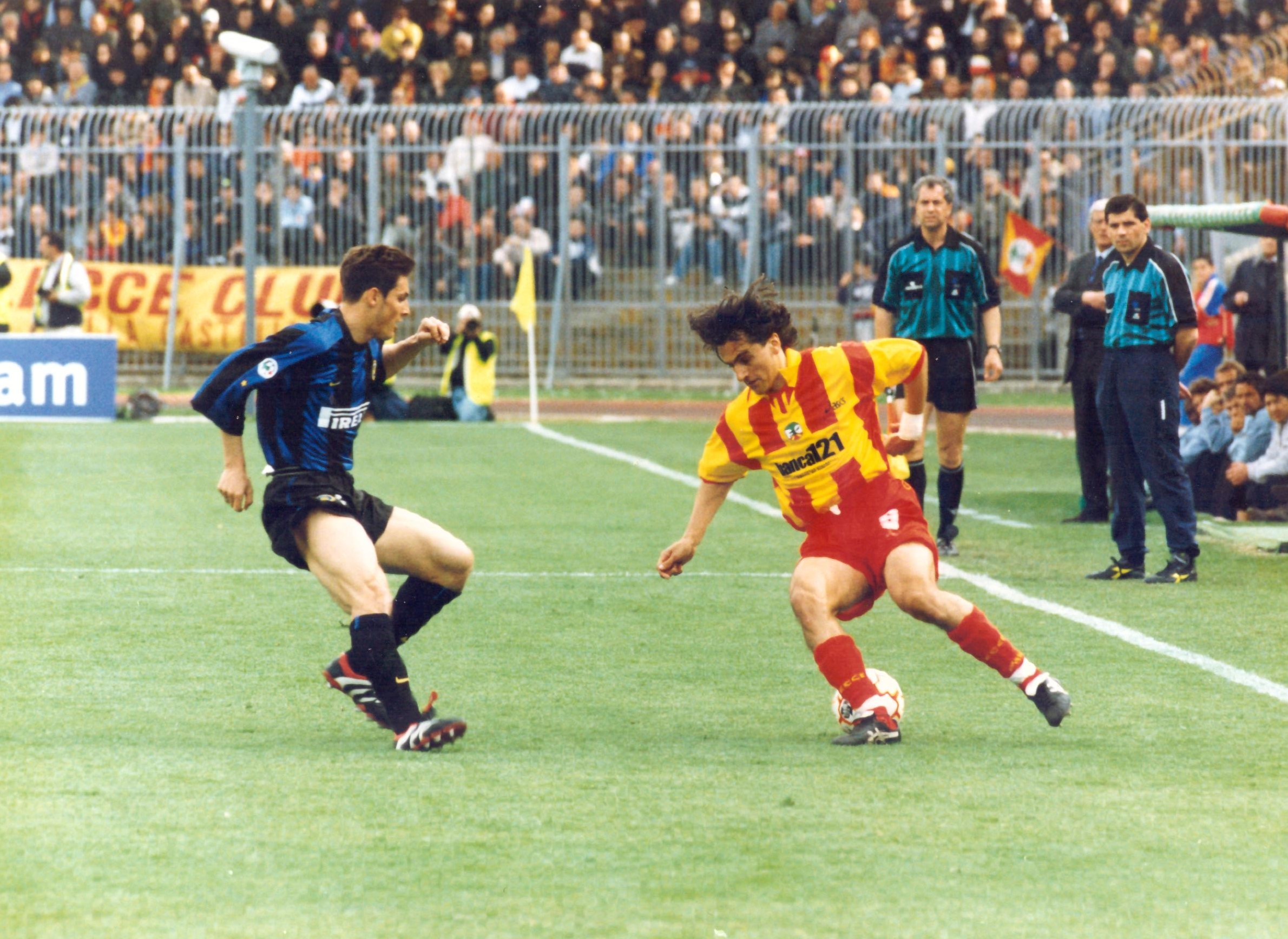
- Alberto Savino (right) and Javier Zanetti (left).

Personal information
- Full name: Alberto Benvenuto Savino
- Date of birth: 1 September 1973 (age 53)
- Place of birth: Pompei, Italy
- Height: 1.82 m (6 ft 0 in)
- Position: Central defender

Team information
- Current team: Nola

Youth career
- ?–1992: Savoia
- 1991–1992: → Turris (loan)

Senior career*
Years	Team	Apps	(Gls)
1992–1995	Savoia	67	(1)
1995–1999	Brescia	107	(2)
1999–2004	Lecce	93	(2)
2003	→ Napoli (loan)	14	(0)
2004	Ternana	12	(0)
2004–2005	Napoli	7	(1)
2005	Venezia	2	(0)
2005–2006	Savoia	25	(1)
2006–2007	Pavia	9	(1)
2007–2008	Scafatese	11	(0)
2008–2009	Gallipoli	6	(0)
2009–2010	Matera	11	(0)
2010–	Nola		

International career
2009–2012	Two Sicilies	?	(0)
- * Club domestic league appearances and goals

Alberto Savino (born 1 September 1973) is an Italian former footballer who played for Nola as a defender.

== Career ==
Born in Pompei, the Province of Naples, Savino started his professional career at Serie C2 side Savoia which is based in Torre Annunziata, located in the Province of Naples. In the summer of 1995, he was signed by Serie B side Brescia. He made his league debut on 10 September 1995, substituting Giandomenico Costi, in the 31st minute. He played for Brescia for 4 seasons, winning a Serie B championship and Serie A promotion in 1997, and followed the team as they were relegated back to Serie B in 1998. After Brescia failed to promoted back to Serie A, Savino was sold to Lecce in co-ownership deal in 1999, at the end of the 1998–99 season, during which Lecce won promotion to Serie A as Serie B 3rd place.

In summer 2002, he followed Lecce as they were relegated back to Serie B. He played the opening match of the season as Lorenzo Stovini's backup, coming on in the 60th minute. He made 4 more starts in 7 more league appearances in October and in November, before leaving on loan to league rivals Napoli in January 2003. Savino returned to Lecce, who had been promoted back to Serie A, but remained an unused sub throughout the entire season, before joining Serie B side Ternana in January 2004.

In summer 2004, he joined Serie C1 side Napoli Soccer (a new company/team founded to replace the recently bankrupted S.S.C. Napoli), but played a half season before joining Serie B strugglers Venezia. The club were relegated and went bankrupt in 2005. He subsequently played a season for his first professional club Savoia but in the non-professional Italian league Serie D. In December 2006, he was signed by Serie C1 side Pavia. In December 2007, he was signed by Serie C2 side Scafatese along with Vincenzo Bevo. In September 2008, he joined Lega Pro Prima Divisione (ex-Serie C1) side Gallipoli.

== Honours ==
Brescia

- Serie B: 1996–97

Gallipoli

- Lega Pro Prima Divisione: 2009
