= Daniele Daino =

Italian footballer (born 1979)

Personal information
- Date of birth: 8 September 1979 (age 47)
- Place of birth: Alessandria, Italy
- Height: 1.81 m (5 ft 11 1/2 in)
- Position: Defender

Youth career
- 1995–1996: A.C. Milan

Senior career*
Years	Team	Apps	(Gls)
1996–2002	A.C. Milan	20	(0)
1998–1999	→ Napoli (loan)	35	(0)
1999–2000	→ Perugia (loan)	8	(0)
2001–2002	→ Derby County (loan)	2	(0)
2002–2004	Ancona	37	(1)
2004–2008	Bologna	101	(3)
2008–2009	Modena	9	(0)
2009–2010	Gallipoli	19	(3)
2011–2012	Alessandria	6	(0)
Total		237	(7)

International career
1994	Italy U-15	3	(1)
1995–1996	Italy U-16	8	(1)
1996	Italy U-18	3	(0)
1998	Italy U-20	3	(0)
1998–1999	Italy U-21	3	(0)
- * Club domestic league appearances and goals as of 24 September 2012

Daniele Daino (born 8 September 1979) is an Italian former professional footballer who played as a defender.

== Career ==
He played for AC Milan, Napoli, Perugia, Ancona and Bologna in Italy.

In 2001, he was signed on loan by English side Derby County, facing competition from Benfica and Alavés but made only two league appearances in the first two matches of the season.

He was successively signed by Modena in November 2008 as a free agent, after his contract with Bologna expired. He left Modena in June 2009, and joined newly promoted Gallipoli at the end of August.
