= Mohammed Aliyu Datti =

Nigerian footballer

Mohammed Aliyu
Personal information
- Date of birth: 14 March 1982 (age 44)
- Place of birth: Kaduna, Nigeria
- Height: 1.80 m (5 ft 11 in)
- Position: Striker

Youth career
- Kaduna United FC

Senior career*
Years	Team	Apps	(Gls)
1997	Padova	4	(0)
1998	Ravenna	29	(0)
1998–2003	A.C. Milan	2	(0)
2000–2001	→ Monza (loan)	26	(3)
2002–2003	→ Siena (loan)	4	(0)
2003–2004	Standard Liège	28	(8)
2004–2005	Mons	30	(14)
2005–2006	Gent	23	(2)
2006	Zulte Waregem	13	(1)
2007–2008	Mons	24	(0)
2009	Niger Tornadoes F.C.	20	(3)
2009–2010	Dessel Sport	3	(0)

International career
2000–2004	Nigeria	3	(0)
- * Club domestic league appearances and goals

Mohammed Aliyu Datti (born 14 March 1982) is a Nigerian former footballer who played as a forward.

== Career ==
Aliyu started his career with Padova.
