= 1998–99 Serie A =

97th season of top-tier Italian football

Serie A
- Season: 1998–99
- Dates: 12 September 1998 – 23 May 1999
- Champions: Milan; 16th title
- Relegated: Salernitana; Sampdoria; Vicenza; Empoli
- Champions League: Milan; Lazio; Fiorentina; Parma
- UEFA Cup: Roma; Udinese; Bologna
- Intertoto Cup: Juventus; Perugia
- Matches: 306
- Goals: 845 (2.76 per match)
- Top goalscorer: Márcio Amoroso (22 goals)

The 1998–99 Serie A saw Milan win their 16th Scudetto, led by coach Alberto Zaccheroni. Lazio finished second, losing the title on the last day. Inter Milan, with an often injured or rested Ronaldo, had a disastrous season, finishing in 8th position, whereas Juventus' impressive start was cut short by a bad injury to Alessandro Del Piero, and they wound up having an unimpressive season.

Serie A 1998-99 team distribution

== Teams ==
Salernitana, Venezia, Cagliari and Perugia had been promoted from Serie B.

== Personnels and Sponsoring ==
Team	Head coach	Kit manufacturer	Shirt sponsor
Bari	(Italy) Eugenio Fascetti	Lotto	TELE+
Bologna	(Italy) Carlo Mazzone	Diadora	Granarolo
Cagliari	(Italy) Gian Piero Ventura	Biemme	Pecorino Sardo
Empoli	(Italy) Corrado Orrico	Errea	Sammontana
Fiorentina	(Italy) Giovanni Trapattoni	Fila	Nintendo
Inter	(England) Roy Hodgson	Nike	Pirelli
Juventus	(Italy) Carlo Ancelotti	Kappa	D+
Lazio	(Sweden) Sven-Göran Eriksson	Puma	Cirio
Milan	(Italy) Alberto Zaccheroni	Adidas	Opel
Parma	(Italy) Alberto Malesani	Lotto	Parmalat
Perugia	(Federal Republic of Yugoslavia) Vujadin Boškov	Galex	None
Piacenza	(Italy) Giuseppe Materazzi	Lotto	Copra (Home)/Gruppo DAC (Away)
Roma	(Czech Republic) Zdenek Zeman	Diadora	INA Assitalia
Salernitana	(Italy) Francesco Oddo	Asics	Exigo Jeans & Casual
Sampdoria	(Italy) Luciano Spalletti	Asics	Daewoo Matiz
Udinese	(Italy) Francesco Guidolin	Diadora	Telital
Venezia	(Italy) Walter Novellino	Kronos	Emmezeta
Vicenza	(Italy) Edoardo Reja	Biemme	Belfe

== League table ==
Pos	Team	Pld	W	D	L	GF	GA	GD	Pts	Qualification or relegation
1	Milan (C)	34	20	10	4	59	34	+25	70	Qualification to Champions League group stage
2	Lazio	34	20	9	5	65	31	+34	69	Qualification to Champions League group stage
3	Fiorentina	34	16	8	10	55	41	+14	56	Qualification to Champions League third qualifying round
4	Parma	34	15	10	9	55	36	+19	55	Qualification to Champions League third qualifying round
5	Roma	34	15	9	10	69	49	+20	54 (Note: ROM 7pts. JUV 5pts. UDI 4pts.)	Qualification to UEFA Cup first round
6	Udinese (Note: Udinese gained entry to the 1999–2000 UEFA Cup winning the UEFA Cup qualification match against Juventus)	34	16	6	12	52	52	0	54	Qualification to UEFA Cup first round
7	Juventus (Note: Juventus qualified to the 1999 UEFA Intertoto Cup Third round.)	34	15	9	10	42	36	+6	54	Qualification to Intertoto Cup third round
8	Inter Milan	34	13	7	14	59	54	+5	46	
9	Bologna (Note: Bologna gained entry to the 1999–2000 UEFA Cup winning the cup third place UEFA Cup qualification match against Inter Milan)	34	11	11	12	44	47	−3	44	Qualification to UEFA Cup first round
10	Bari	34	9	15	10	39	44	−5	42 (Note: BAR 1–0 VEN, VEN 2–1 BAR)	
11	Venezia	34	11	9	14	38	45	−7	42	
12	Piacenza	34	11	8	15	48	49	−1	41 (Note: CAG 3–2 PIA, PIA 2–0 CAG)	
13	Cagliari	34	11	8	15	49	50	−1	41	
14	Perugia (Note: Perugia gained entry to the 1999 UEFA Intertoto Cup Second round after the renounce of several teams.)	34	11	6	17	43	61	−18	39	Qualification to Intertoto Cup second round
15	Salernitana (R)	34	10	8	16	37	51	−14	38	Relegation to Serie B
16	Sampdoria (R)	34	9	10	15	38	55	−17	37	Relegation to Serie B
17	Vicenza (R)	34	8	9	17	27	47	−20	33	Relegation to Serie B
18	Empoli (Note: Empoli were docked two points due to attempted bribery of referee during a match against Sampdoria on 25 October 1998.) (R)	34	4	10	20	26	63	−37	20	Relegation to Serie B

Source: Serie A, RSSSF.com, Soccerway
Rules for classification: 1) Points; 2) Head-to-head points; 3) Head-to-head goal difference; 4) Goal difference; 5) Goals scored; 6) Draw. (Note: Head-to-head record is used only after all the matches between the teams in question have been played).
(C) Champions; (R) Relegated

== Results ==
Home \ Away	BAR	BOL	CAG	EMP	FIO	INT	JUV	LAZ	MIL	PAR	PER	PIA	ROM	SAL	SAM	UDI	VEN	VIC
Bari		0–0	1–1	2–1	0–0	1–0	0–1	1–3	0–0	1–1	2–1	3–1	1–4	0–0	3–1	1–1	1–0	0–0
Bologna	3–1		1–3	2–0	3–0	2–0	3–0	0–1	2–3	0–0	1–1	3–1	1–1	1–1	2–2	1–3	2–1	4–2
Cagliari	3–3	0–1		5–1	1–1	2–2	1–0	0–0	1–0	1–0	2–2	3–2	4–3	3–1	5–0	1–2	0–1	1–0
Empoli	0–2	0–0	2–1		0–3	1–2	1–0	0–0	1–1	3–5	2–0	1–2	0–0	2–3	0–1	1–3	2–2	1–0
Fiorentina	2–2	1–0	4–2	2–0		3–1	1–0	1–1	0–0	2–1	5–1	2–1	0–0	4–0	1–0	1–0	4–1	3–0
Inter Milan	2–3	3–1	5–1	5–1	2–0		0–0	3–5	2–2	1–3	2–0	1–0	4–1	2–1	3–0	1–3	6–2	1–1
Juventus	1–1	2–2	1–0	0–0	2–1	1–0		0–1	0–2	2–4	2–1	1–0	1–1	3–0	2–0	2–1	3–2	2–0
Lazio	0–0	2–0	2–0	4–1	2–0	1–0	1–3		0–0	2–1	3–0	4–1	3–3	6–1	5–2	3–1	2–0	1–1
Milan	2–2	3–0	1–0	4–0	1–3	2–2	1–1	1–0		2–1	2–1	1–0	3–2	3–2	3–2	3–0	2–1	1–0
Parma	2–1	1–1	1–1	1–0	2–0	1–0	1–0	1–3	4–0		3–1	0–1	1–1	2–0	1–1	4–1	2–2	0–0
Perugia	0–1	0–0	2–1	3–1	2–2	2–1	3–4	2–2	1–2	2–1		2–0	3–2	1–0	2–0	1–3	1–0	3–1
Piacenza	3–2	5–0	2–0	0–0	4–2	0–0	0–2	1–1	1–1	3–6	2–0		2–0	1–1	4–1	4–3	0–1	2–0
Roma	1–1	3–1	3–1	1–1	2–1	4–5	2–0	3–1	1–0	1–0	5–1	2–2		3–1	3–1	4–0	2–0	3–0
Salernitana	2–2	4–0	1–3	1–1	1–1	2–0	1–0	1–0	1–2	1–2	2–0	1–1	2–1		2–0	1–2	1–0	2–1
Sampdoria	1–0	1–1	0–0	3–0	3–2	4–0	1–2	0–1	2–2	0–2	1–1	3–2	2–1	1–0		1–1	2–1	0–0
Udinese	4–0	2–0	2–1	0–0	1–0	0–1	2–2	0–3	1–5	2–1	1–2	1–0	2–1	2–0	2–2		1–1	2–1
Venezia	2–1	0–2	1–0	3–2	4–1	3–1	1–1	2–0	0–2	0–0	2–1	0–0	3–1	0–0	0–0	1–0		1–2
Vicenza	1–0	0–4	2–1	2–0	1–2	1–1	1–1	1–2	0–2	0–0	3–0	1–0	1–4	1–0	1–0	2–3	0–0	

Source: lega-calcio.it (in Italian)
Legend: Blue = home team win; Yellow = draw; Red = away team win.

== UEFA Cup qualification ==
6th and 7th of Serie A:

28 May 1999

Udinese	0–0	Juventus

Stadio Friuli, Udine
Referee: Graziano Cesari (Genoa)

31 May 1999

Juventus	1–1	Udinese
Inzaghi 23' (pen.)		Poggi 71'

Stadio Delle Alpi, Turin
Referee: Stefano Braschi (Prato)

Coppa Italia Third place:

27 May 1999

Inter Milan	1–2	Bologna
Baggio 59'		Andersson 7'; Paramatti 49'

Stadio Giuseppe Meazza, Milan
Referee: Robert Boggi (Salerno)

30 May 1999

Bologna	2–1	Inter Milan
Signori 3'; Bettarini 41'		Ventola 90'

Stadio Renato Dall'Ara, Bologna
Referee: Graziano Cesari (Genoa)

Udinese and Bologna qualified to 1999–2000 UEFA Cup, while Juventus qualified for the 1999 UEFA Intertoto Cup.

== Top goalscorers ==
Rank	Player	Club	Goals
1	(Brazil) Márcio Amoroso	Udinese	22
2	(Argentina) Gabriel Batistuta	Fiorentina	21
3	(Germany) Oliver Bierhoff	Milan	20
4	(Italy) Marco Delvecchio	Roma	18
5	(Argentina) Hernán Crespo	Parma	16
5	(Italy) Roberto Muzzi	Cagliari	16
7	(Italy) Simone Inzaghi	Piacenza	15
7	(Chile) Marcelo Salas	Lazio	15
7	(Italy) Giuseppe Signori	Bologna	15
10	(Brazil) Ronaldo	Inter Milan	14

== Attendances ==
#	Club	Avg. attendance
1	Internazionale	68,459
2	AC Milan	57,760
3	AS Roma	54,309
4	SS Lazio	53,184
5	Juventus FC	47,164
6	ACF Fiorentina	35,037
7	US Salernitana 1919	32,218
8	Bologna FC	28,848
9	Parma AC	24,328
10	Udinese Calcio	23,384
11	Cagliari Calcio	21,422
12	AS Bari	21,227
13	UC Sampdoria	20,463
14	AC Perugia	17,157
15	Vicenza Calcio	16,143
16	Piacenza Calcio	11,816
17	Empoli FC	11,292
18	Venezia FC	10,919

== References and sources ==
- Almanacco Illustrato del Calcio – La Storia 1898-2004, Panini Edizioni, Modena, September 2005
