= Mirco Sadotti =

Italian footballer (born 1975)

Personal information
- Date of birth: 18 May 1975 (age 51)
- Place of birth: Arezzo, Italy
- Height: 1.88 m (6 ft 2 in)
- Position: Defender

Youth career
- Milan

Senior career*
Years	Team	Apps	(Gls)
1994–1995	Cesena	19	(0)
1995–1996	Venezia	14	(0)
1996–1997	Salernitana	13	(0)
1997–1999	Monza	55	(0)
1999	Milan	0	(0)
2000	Lecce	2	(0)
2000–2001	Pescara	24	(0)
2002	Padova	10	(0)
2002–2004	Reggiana	50	(2)
2004–2005	SPAL	32	(2)
2005–2006	Montevarchi	27	(0)
2006–2009	Poggibonsi	78	(3)

International career
1992–1993	Italy U-18	7	(0)
1995	Italy U-21	1	(0)
- * Club domestic league appearances and goals

Mirco Sadotti (born 18 May 1975 in Arezzo) is a retired Italian professional footballer who played as a defender.

He played two games in the Serie A in the 1999–2000 season for Italian club U.S. Lecce. At international level, he also represented the Italy national under-21 football team.
