= AC Milan and the Italy national football team =

This article lists all the players that played for different tiers of the Italy national football teams while with AC Milan. Players who represented Italy before or after they played for Milan are unlisted. The players who were called up to the squad but did not play in any games are unlisted.

== List of call-ups of AC Milan players to the Italy national football team ==
As of 15 November 2023.

Player	Appearances	Goals	Appearances as captain
Paolo Maldini	126	7	74
Franco Baresi	81	1	31
Demetrio Albertini	79	2	6
Andrea Pirlo	74	9	4
Gennaro Gattuso	73	1	2
Gianni Rivera	60	14	4
Alessandro Costacurta	59	2	3
Roberto Donadoni	59	5	0
Massimo Ambrosini	35	0	1
Fulvio Collovati	33	3	0
Gianluigi Donnarumma	33	0	0
Mattia De Sciglio	31	0	0
Alessandro Nesta	31	0	3
Romeo Benetti	29	0	0
Riccardo Montolivo	29	1	2
Filippo Inzaghi	25	10	0
Roberto Rosato	23	0	0
Gianluca Zambrotta	23	0	2
Ignazio Abate	22	1	0
Alberto Gilardino	19	7	0
Carlo Annovazzi	17	0	6
Mario Balotelli	17	8	0
Giovanni Lodetti	17	2	0
Giovanni Trapattoni	17	1	0
Antonio Cassano	15	5	1
Cesare Maldini	14	0	6
Omero Tognon	14	0	0
Carlo Ancelotti	13	0	0
Giacomo Bonaventura	13	0	0
Stephan El Shaarawy	13	1	0
Amleto Frignani	13	6	0
Pierino Prati	13	7	0
Renzo De Vecchi	12	0	0
Stefano Eranio	12	3	0
Alessio Romagnoli	12	2	0
Sandro Tonali	11	0	0
Leonardo Bonucci	10	1	3
Aldo Maldera	10	0	0
Bruno Mora	10	2	0
Daniele Massaro	9	1	0
Antonio Nocerino	9	0	0
Massimo Oddo	9	0	0
Riccardo Carapellese	8	7	2
Aldo Cevenini	8	1	0
Sandro Salvadore	8	0	0
Davide Calabria	7	0	0
Mauro Tassotti	7	0	0
José Altafini	6	5	0
Luca Antonelli	6	0	0
Francesco Coco	6	0	0
Alberico Evani	6	0	0
Gianluigi Lentini	6	0	0
Cesare Lovati	6	0	0
Giuseppe Pancaro	6	0	0
Daniele Bonera	5	0	0
Fabio Capello	5	0	0
Carlo Galli	5	1	0
Luigi Radice	5	0	0
Alberto Aquilani	4	0	0
Sergio Battistini	4	1	0
Gastone Bean	4	0	0
Lorenzo Buffon	4	0	0
Alessandro Florenzi	4	0	1
Christian Panucci	4	1	0
Giuseppe Sabadini	4	0	0
Juan Alberto Schiaffino	4	0	0
Marco Simone	4	0	0
Christian Vieri	4	1	0
Mario Bergamaschi	3	0	0
Renzo Burini	3	1	0
Alfio Fontana	3	0	0
Mario Magnozzi	3	1	0
Arturo Silvestri	3	0	0
Attilio Trerè	3	0	0
Luciano Zecchini	3	0	0
Christian Abbiati	2	0	0
Angelo Anquilletti	2	0	0
Roberto Baggio	2	1	0
Andrea Bertolacci	2	0	0
Aldo Boffi	2	0	0
Dario Bonetti	2	0	0
Marco Borriello	2	0	0
Ruben Buriani	2	0	0
Egidio Capra	2	0	0
Gustavo Carrer	2	1	0
Luciano Chiarugi	2	0	0
Pietro Grosso	2	0	0
Pietro Lana	2	3	0
Saul Malatrasi	2	0	0
Tommaso Pobega	2	0	0
Andrea Poli	2	0	0
Giuseppe Rizzi	2	0	0
Paolo Rossi	2	0	0
Mario Trebbi	2	0	0
Andrea Bonomi	1	0	0
Cristian Brocchi	1	0	0
Mattia Caldara	1	0	0
Andrea Conti	1	0	0
Patrick Cutrone	1	0	0
Mario David	1	0	0
Giorgio Ghezzi	1	0	0
Walter Alfredo Novellino	1	0	0
Giampaolo Pazzini	1	0	0
Eduardo Ricagni	1	0	0
Marco Sala	1	0	0
Abdon Sgarbi	1	0	0

== Winners of official competitions with the Italy national football team ==
=== World Cup ===
- Pietro Arcari (1934)
- Franco Baresi (1982)
- Fulvio Collovati (1982)
- Gennaro Gattuso (2006)
- Alberto Gilardino (2006)
- Filippo Inzaghi (2006)
- Alessandro Nesta (2006)
- Andrea Pirlo (2006)

=== European Championship ===
- Angelo Anquilletti (1968)
- Giovanni Lodetti (1968)
- Pierino Prati (1968)
- Gianni Rivera (1968)
- Roberto Rosato (1968)
- Gianluigi Donnarumma (2020)

== List of call-ups of AC Milan players to other Italy national football teams ==
=== List of call-ups of AC Milan players to the Italian Olympic football team ===
As of July 2018.

- Ignazio Abate
- Demetrio Albertini
- Francesco Antonioli
- Franco Baresi
- Fulvio Collovati

=== List of call-ups of AC Milan players to the Italy national under-23 football team ===
As of July 2018.

- Marcello Campolonghi
- Francesco Coco

=== List of call-ups of AC Milan players to the Italy national under-21 football team ===
As of July 2018.

- Christian Abbiati
- Demetrio Albertini
- Massimo Ambrosini
- Francesco Antonioli
- Franco Baresi
- Sergio Battistini
- Marco Borriello
- Davide Calabria
- Francesco Coco
- Fulvio Collovati
- Gianni Comandini
- Alessandro Costacurta
- Carlo Cudicini
- Patrick Cutrone
- Daniele Daino
- Samuele Dalla Bona
- Matteo Darmian
- Davide Di Gennaro
- Roberto Donadoni
- Massimo Donati
- Gianluigi Donnarumma
- Stephan El Shaarawy
- Alberigo Evani
- Diego Fuser
- Giuseppe Galderisi
- Filippo Galli
- Gennaro Gattuso
- Andrea Icardi
- Giuseppe Incocciati
- Christian Lantignotti
- Manuel Locatelli
- Tomas Locatelli
- Roberto Lorenzini
- Guido Magherini
- Aldo Maldera
- Paolo Maldini
- Angelo Marchi
- José Mauri
- Christian Panucci
- Andrea Pirlo
- Alessandro Plizzari
- Francesco Romano
- Alessio Romagnoli
- Stefano Salvatori
- Marco Simone
- Giovanni Stroppa
- Mauro Tassotti
- Villiam Vecchi
- Silvano Villa
- Francesco Zanoncelli
- Vincenzo Zazzaro

=== List of call-ups of AC Milan players to the Italy national under-20 football team ===
As of July 2018.

- Michelangelo Albertazzi
- Giacomo Beretta
- Matteo Bruscagin
- Matteo Darmian
- Michele Ferri
- Elia Legati
- Lino Marzoratti
- José Mauri
- Nicola Pasini

=== List of call-ups of AC Milan players to the Italy national under-19 football team ===
As of July 2018.

- Michelangelo Albertazzi
- Luca Antonelli
- Matteo Ardemagni
- Roberto Bortolotto
- Matteo Bruscagin
- Matteo Darmian
- Davide Di Gennaro
- Marco Donadel
- Elia Legati
- Daniel Maldini
- Lino Marzoratti
- Alberto Paloschi
- Andrea Petagna
- Romano Perticone
- Federico Piazza
- Michele Piccolo
- Paolo Sammarco
- Mirko Stefani
- Matteo Teoldi
- Gianmarco Zigoni
- Stephan El Shaarawy

=== List of call-ups of AC Milan players to the Italy national under-18 football team ===
As of July 2018.

- Ignazio Abate
- Simonluca Agazzone
- Demetrio Albertini
- Massimo Ambrosini
- Luca Antonini
- Matteo Ardemagni
- Davide Astori
- Roberto Bortolotto
- Alessio Bozzetti
- Gianpaolo Castorina
- Felice Cavaliere
- Francesco Coco
- Roberto Colombo
- Nicola Corrent
- Carlo Cudicini
- Daniele Daino
- Matteo Darmian
- Francesco De Francesco
- Michele Del Vecchio
- Davide Di Gennaro
- Michele Ferri
- Luca Gosniach
- Alessandro Iacono
- Marcello Lambrughi
- Daniel Maldini
- Claudio Mastrapasqua
- Romano Francesco Maurino
- Stefano Mondini
- Nicola Padoin
- Andrea Petagna
- Romano Perticone
- Matteo Placida
- Alessandro Quattrini
- Andrea Rabito
- Mattia Rinaldini
- Lorenzo Rossetti
- Mirco Sadotti
- Antonio Sarcinella
- Mario Stancanelli
- Mirko Stefani
- Gianmarco Zigoni

=== List of call-ups of AC Milan players to the Italy national under-17 football team ===
As of July 2018.

- Michelangelo Albertazzi
- Luca Antonini
- Simone Bonomi
- Francesco Brunetti
- Riccardo Caraglia
- Nicola Corrent
- Francesco De Francesco
- Davide Di Gennaro
- Marco Donadel
- Marco Gaeta
- Mirco Gasparetto
- Mauro Gilardi
- Marcello Lambrughi
- Lino Marzoratti
- Claudio Mastrapasqua
- Fabio Moro
- Nicola Padoin
- Alberto Paloschi
- Nicola Pasini
- Filippo Perucchini
- Andrea Petagna
- Federico Piazza
- Andrea Rabito
- Lorenzo Rossetti
- Alessandro Ruggeri
- Paolo Sammarco
- Matteo Teoldi
- Francesco Tortorelli

=== List of call-ups of AC Milan players to the Italy national under-16 football team ===
As of July 2018.

- Omar Fawzy
- Simonluca Agazzone
- Carmelo Augliera
- Simone Bonomi
- Antonio Borrelli
- Riccardo Caraglia
- Alessandro Cesca
- Enrico Da Ros
- Daniele Daino
- Francesco De Francesco
- Massimo De Martin
- Matteo Deinite
- Davide Di Gennaro
- Marco Donadel
- Alessandro Ercolani
- Davide Favaro
- Pasquale Foggia
- Marco Gaeta
- Marcello Lambrughi
- Giuseppe Liperoti
- Massimo Maccarone
- Battista Maina
- Enrico Malatesta
- Cristiano Manenti
- Lino Marzoratti
- James Peluchetti
- Andrea Petagna
- Federico Piazza
- Andrea Posocco
- Gabriele Sabatini
- Mirko Stefani
- Fabio Valsesia

=== List of call-ups of AC Milan players to the Italy national under-15 football team ===
As of July 2018.

- Carmelo Augliera
- Simone Bonomi
- Marco Candrina
- Felice Cavaliere
- Enrico Cortese
- Daniele Daino
- Francesco De Francesco
- Matteo Deinite
- Marco Donadel
- Pasquale Foggia
- Massimiliano Greco
- Massimo Maccarone
- Cristiano Manenti
- Stefano Pastrello
- Enrico Rossoni
- Lorenzo Rossetti
- Matteo Tosin
- Fabio Valsesia
