= 2012–13 AC Milan season =

Milan
2012–13 season
- Chairman Honorary chairman: Vacant; Silvio Berlusconi
- Head coach: Massimiliano Allegri
- Stadium: San Siro
- Serie A: 3rd
- Coppa Italia: Quarter-finals
- UEFA Champions League: Round of 16
- Top goalscorer: League: Stephan El Shaarawy (16); All: Stephan El Shaarawy (20)
- Highest home attendance: 79,532 vs Barcelona, Champions League, 20 February 2013
- Lowest home attendance: 27,593 vs Anderlecht, Champions League, 18 September 2012
- Average home league attendance: 43,651
Home colours	Away colours	Third colours

The 2012–13 season was Associazione Calcio Milan's 79th in the Serie A and 30th consecutive season in the top flight of Italian football. Milan strived to regain the Serie A title, which they lost to Juventus in the previous season. The Rossoneri also competed in UEFA Champions League, as well as the Coppa Italia.

This season was the first not to feature a number of recent club legends, namely Gennaro Gattuso (1999–2012), Filippo Inzaghi (2001–2012), Clarence Seedorf (2002–2012), and Alessandro Nesta (2002–2012), whose contracts were not extended at the end of the previous season. High-profile players arriving at the club as veterans, namely Gianluca Zambrotta and Mark van Bommel, were also released from their contracts following their expiration on 1 July 2012. Finally, star players Thiago Silva and Zlatan Ibrahimović unexpectedly left Milan during pre-season when the club accepted transfer offers for both from PSG.

Due to financial problems, the club failed to sign any high-profile players as suitable replacements for the departed team leaders, which had a long-term negative effect on the team's morale and ability to compete for trophies. However, as Alexandre Pato decided to move back to Brazil in January 2013, the UEFA Euro 2012 star striker Mario Balotelli was signed from Manchester City to front the team's attack.

On the contrary, senior players Massimo Ambrosini and Christian Abbiati, both 35 years of age at the time, had their contracts extended and named captain and vice-captain for the season. The duo had been at the club together since the 1998–99 season, in which they won the Scudetto as part of the starting XI under manager Alberto Zaccheroni.

Over the first 6 months of the season, Milan struggled a lot, losing a total of 9 games (7 in Serie A and 2 in the Champions League), as well as 4 pre-season friendlies. In 2013, however, the team lost only three games across all competitions. With 13 more wins and 6 draws in the Serie A, the club eventually finished in the 3rd place, securing a spot in the 2013–14 UEFA Champions League qualification play-off, which became the club's main objective for the season following the team's elimination in the round of 16 of the previous edition of the competition.

== Players ==

Starting line-up. Until the signing of Mario Balotelli in the winter transfer session, Giampaolo Pazzini was the first choice as central striker in the forward line.

As of 25 January 2013.

Note: Flags indicate national team as defined under FIFA eligibility rules; some limited exceptions apply. Players may hold more than one non-FIFA nationality.

No.	Pos.	Nation	Player
1	GK	ITA	Marco Amelia
2	DF	ITA	Mattia De Sciglio
4	MF	GHA	Sulley Muntari
5	DF	FRA	Philippe Mexès
7	FW	BRA	Robinho
8	MF	ITA	Antonio Nocerino
9	FW	BRA	Alexandre Pato
10	MF	GHA	Kevin-Prince Boateng
11	FW	ITA	Giampaolo Pazzini
12	MF	MLI	Bakaye Traore
14	DF	POL	Bartosz Salamon
16	MF	FRA	Mathieu Flamini
17	DF	COL	Cristián Zapata (on loan from Villarreal)
18	MF	ITA	Riccardo Montolivo
19	FW	FRA	M'Baye Niang

No.	Pos.	Nation	Player
20	DF	ITA	Ignazio Abate
21	MF	GUI	Kévin Constant
22	FW	ESP	Bojan (on loan from Barcelona)
23	MF	ITA	Massimo Ambrosini (captain)
25	DF	ITA	Daniele Bonera
32	GK	ITA	Christian Abbiati (vice-captain)
34	MF	NED	Nigel de Jong
35	DF	ESP	Dídac Vilà
45	FW	ITA	Mario Balotelli
59	GK	BRA	Gabriel
76	DF	COL	Mario Yepes
77	DF	ITA	Luca Antonini
81	DF	ITA	Cristian Zaccardo
92	FW	ITA	Stephan El Shaarawy

== Pre-season and friendlies ==
Win Draw Loss

Milan began their pre-season training at Milanello on Monday, 9 July 2012. The Rossoneri played their first set of friendlies in Bari on 21, July, 2012 to contest the TIM Trophy consisting of three games, of 45 minutes each, against rivals Internazionale and Juventus. Milan's first game was against Juventus, they started well but The Old Lady were awarded a penalty after Bakaye Traoré tackled Mirko Vučinić inside the box in the 31st minute, he then converted the spot-kick which subsequently resulted in Milan's first loss. Their second game was against Inter, Il Diavolo would go ahead in the 16th minute through a Stephan El Shaarawy strike, but Nerazzuri would come back to win through a Fredy Guarín header in the 25th minute, and with Rodrigo Palacio scoring the tie-breaker in the 34th minute, forcing Milan to finish last in the competition with two losses.

On Tuesday, 24 July 2012, Milan played German side Schalke 04 at the Veltins-Arena in Gelsenkirchen, in a balanced match of offense and defense, Urby Emanuelson scored in the 62nd minute to break the stalemate, his sole strike would go on and win the friendly match for the Rossoneri. On Saturday, 28 July 2012, Milan contended in the World Football Challenge, playing a friendly against 2011–12 UEFA Champions League winners, Chelsea, in Miami, Milan looked to be physically dominated by the Blues in the early stages, but became the livelier of the two sides later on, and in the second half, in the 68th minute, after a clinical counter by the Rossoneri, Kevin-Prince Boateng played a perfect through ball to Urby Emanuelson drawing two defenders before passing the ball off to Stephan El Shaarawy. El Shaarawy's subsequent shot was parried by Petr Čech into Emanuelson's path who struck it into the net for the only goal in the game, and a second win for Milan.

Milan played Honduran side Olimpia on Saturday, 4 August in Massachusetts. Milan took the lead in the 24th minute when Robinho shot a low effort from outside the box into the bottom left corner of the goal. Antonio Nocerino would then score the second goal from a Robinho assist and his second, Milan's third, from an Ignazio Abate low cross after drawing the keeper out of his goal in the 37 and 44th minutes, respectively, although Olimpia would pull one back through José Escalante in the 72nd minute. Milan next played Spanish champions Real Madrid in the World Football Challenge at Yankee Stadium in New York on Wednesday, 8 August. Both teams started with strong lineups but it was Madrid who took the through Ángel Di María in the 24th minute. Robinho managed to equalise for Milan nine minutes later as both teams went into half time level. Milan made nine changes to the side after halftime. Milan were unable to keep the same rhythm, however, as Cristiano Ronaldo scored two goals in the 49th and 66th minutes and goals from Sergio Ramos and José Callejón in the 81st and 89th minute of the match damaged Milan to a heavy 5–1 defeat in the match.

A week later, Milan played their final pre-season game against Juventus in the annual Trofeo Berlusconi at the San Siro on Sunday, 19 August. Robinho opened the scoring for Milan after netting home in the ninth minute. Claudio Marchisio, however, managed to equalize four minutes later and Juventus went into the break with the lead with Arturo Vidal slipping the ball home three minutes before halftime. In the second half, Milan made changes to try to get back into the game but Alessandro Matri netted Juventus' third goal of the night in the 64th minute. Robinho managed to reduce the deficit with a penalty goal 13 minutes before time. Milan had chances to tie the game but it was not enough as Juventus clinched the Trofeo Luigi Berlusconi.

21 July 2012 TIM Trophy	Juventus	1–0	Milan	Bari, Italy
21:45 CEST	Vučinić 31' (pen.)	Report		Stadium: Stadio San Nicola
Note: 45-minute match

21 July 2012 TIM Trophy	Internazionale	2–1	Milan	Bari, Italy
22:45 CEST	Guarín 25'; Palacio 34'	Report	El Shaarawy 16'	Stadium: Stadio San Nicola
Note: 45-minute match

24 July 2012 Friendly	Schalke 04	0–1	Milan	Gelsenkirchen, Germany
15:00 BST		Report	Emanuelson 62'	Stadium: Veltins-Arena

28 July 2012 World Football Challenge	Chelsea	0–1	Milan	Miami, Florida
18:00 EDT		Report	Emanuelson 68'	Stadium: Sun Life Stadium; Attendance: 57,748; Referee: Ricardo Salazar (United States)

4 August 2012 Friendly	Milan	3–1	Olimpia	Foxborough, Massachusetts
16:30 EDT	Robinho 24'; Nocerino 37', 44'	Report	Escalante 72'	Stadium: Gillette Stadium

8 August 2012 World Football Challenge	Real Madrid	5–1	Milan	New York, New York
20:00 EDT	Di María 24'; Ronaldo 49', 66'; Ramos 81'; Callejón 89'	Report	Robinho 33'	Stadium: Yankee Stadium; Attendance: 49,474; Referee: Jair Marrufo

19 August 2012 Trofeo Luigi Berlusconi	Milan	2–3	Juventus	Milan, Italy
23:00 CEST	Robinho 9', 77'	Report	Marchisio 12'; Vidal 43'; Matri 64'	Stadium: San Siro

== Competitions ==
Win Draw Loss

=== Serie A ===
The fixtures for the 2012–13 Serie A were announced on 26 July 2012. The season started on Sunday 26 August 2012 with Milan taking on Sampdoria at the San Siro, it ends Sunday 19 May 2013 with a match away against Siena. Three midweek fixtures were planned, 26 September, 31 October and on 8 May, while the winter break is planned for 23 December to 5 January. The first international break took place the weekend of 8–9 September, which was after the second round of matches, rather than after the first as has happened in recent seasons.

==== League table ====
Pos	Team	Pld	W	D	L	GF	GA	GD	Pts	Qualification or relegation
1	Juventus (C)	38	27	6	5	71	24	+47	87	Qualification for the Champions League group stage
2	Napoli	38	23	9	6	73	36	+37	78	Qualification for the Champions League group stage
3	Milan	38	21	9	8	67	39	+28	72	Qualification for the Champions League play-off round
4	Fiorentina	38	21	7	10	72	44	+28	70	Qualification for the Europa League play-off round
5	Udinese	38	18	12	8	59	45	+14	66	Qualification for the Europa League third qualifying round

Source: Serie A, Soccerway
Rules for classification: 1st points; 2nd head-to-head points; 3rd head-to-head goal difference; 4th goal difference; 5th number of goals scored; 6th public draw.
(Head-to-head record is applied for clubs with the same number of points only once all matches between said clubs have been played)
(C) Champions

==== Results summary ====
Overall								Home						Away					
Pld	W	D	L	GF	GA	GD	Pts	W	D	L	GF	GA	GD	W	D	L	GF	GA	GD
38	21	9	8	67	39	+28	72	13	2	4	33	15	+18	8	7	4	34	24	+10

Last updated: 19 May 2013.
Source: Competitive matches

==== Results by round ====
Round	1	2	3	4	5	6	7	8	9	10	11	12	13	14	15	16	17	18	19	20	21	22	23	24	25	26	27	28	29	30	31	32	33	34	35	36	37	38
Ground	H	A	H	A	H	A	H	A	H	A	H	H	A	H	A	A	H	A	H	A	H	A	H	A	H	A	H	A	H	A	A	H	A	H	H	A	H	A
Result	L	W	L	L	W	D	L	L	W	D	W	L	D	W	W	W	W	L	W	D	W	W	W	D	W	D	W	W	W	W	D	D	L	W	W	W	D	W
Position	13	10	13	15	10	11	11	15	12	12	10	13	12	10	7	7	7	7	7	7	6	5	4	5	3	4	3	3	3	3	3	3	3	3	3	3	3	3

Updated to match(es) played on 9 May 2013. Source: Competitive matches
A = Away; H = Home; W = Win; D = Draw; L = Loss

==== Matches ====
26 August 2012 1	Milan	0–1	Sampdoria	Milan
18:00	Boateng (yellow card) 67'; Bonera (yellow card) 90+2'	Report	Krstičić (yellow card) 16'; Gastaldello (yellow card) 42'; Costa 59', (yellow card) 69'; Tissone (yellow card) 79'; Romero (yellow card) 82'	Stadium: San Siro; Attendance: 36,288; Referee: Luca Banti

1 September 2012 2	Bologna	1–3	Milan	Bologna
20:45	Cherubin (yellow card) 15'; Diamanti 42' (pen.)	Report	Pazzini 16' (pen.), 77', 85', (yellow card) 59'; Montolivo (yellow card) 18'; Bonera (yellow card) 24'; Ambrosini (yellow card) 28'; De Jong (yellow card) 68'	Stadium: Stadio Renato Dall'Ara; Attendance: 22,202; Referee: Paolo Tagliavento

15 September 2012 3	Milan	0–1	Atalanta	Milan
20:45	El Shaarawy (yellow card) 43'; Bonera (yellow card) 57'	Report	Biondini (yellow card) 59'; Cigarini 64', (yellow card) 80'; Moralez (yellow card) 85'; Raimondi (yellow card) 85'	Stadium: San Siro; Attendance: 34,763; Referee: Daniele Orsato

23 September 2012 4	Udinese	2–1	Milan	Udine
15:00	Ranégie 40'; Di Natale 68' (pen.); Pinzi (yellow card) 77'; Coda (yellow card) 80'	Report	Ambrosini (yellow card) 40'; El Shaarawy 54'; Zapata (yellow card) 64' (yellow-red card) 67'; Boateng (yellow card) 75' (yellow-red card) 82'	Stadium: Stadio Friuli; Attendance: 22,976; Referee: Domenico Celi

26 September 2012 5	Milan	2–0	Cagliari	Milan
20:45	De Jong (yellow card) 12'; Bojan 15', 82'; Pazzini (yellow card) 63'; De Sciglio (yellow card) 71'	Report	Pisano (yellow card) 3'; Pinilla (yellow card) 37'; Conti (yellow card) 64' (yellow-red card) 66'	Stadium: San Siro; Attendance: 28,005; Referee: Andrea De Marco

29 September 2012 6	Parma	1–1	Milan	Parma
18:00	Rosi (yellow card) 4'; Galloppa 66'; Biabiany (yellow card) 88'	Report	Ambrosini (yellow card) 20'; El Shaarawy 50'; Boateng (yellow card) 59'; Abbiati (yellow card) 64'	Stadium: Stadio Ennio Tardini; Attendance: 14,239; Referee: Gianluca Rocchi

7 October 2012 7	Milan	0–1	Internazionale	Milan
20:45	Mexès (yellow card) 34'; De Jong (yellow card) 38'; Pazzini (yellow card) 82'; Montolivo (yellow card) 85'; Yepes (yellow card) 88'	Report	Samuel 3'; Juan (yellow card) 11'; Nagatomo (yellow card) 24' (yellow-red card) 48'; Ranocchia (yellow card) 83'	Stadium: San Siro; Attendance: 73,736; Referee: Paolo Valeri

20 October 2012 8	Lazio	3–2	Milan	Rome
19:45	Dias (yellow card) 13'; Hernanes 25'; Candreva 41'; Klose 49'; González (yellow card) 56'	Report	Nocerino (yellow card) 12'; Yepes (yellow card) 37'; Antonini (yellow card) 56'; De Jong 61'; Bojan 79'	Stadium: Olimpico; Attendance: 41,815; Referee: Paolo Tagliavento

27 October 2012 9	Milan	1–0	Genoa	Milan
15:00	Yepes (yellow card) 75'; Bojan 77'	Report	Bertolacci (yellow card) 36'; Bovo (yellow card) 59'	Stadium: San Siro; Attendance: 33,046; Referee: Paolo Mazzoleni

30 October 2012 10	Palermo	2–2	Milan	Palermo
15:00	Miccoli 45+1' (pen.); Brienza 47'; García (yellow card) 58'; Cetto (yellow card) 74'	Report	Bonera (yellow card) 2'; Constant (yellow card) 23'; Flamini (yellow card) 32'; Montolivo 69'; Bojan 80'; Mexès (yellow card) 86'	Stadium: Renzo Barbera; Attendance: 12,346; Referee: Nicola Rizzoli

3 November 2012 11	Milan	5–1	Chievo	Milan
15:00	Emanuelson 16'; Montolivo 36'; Bojan 41'; El Shaarawy 75'; Pazzini 90+2'	Report	Dramé (yellow card) 5'; Pellissier 18'; Guana (yellow card) 55'	Stadium: San Siro; Attendance: 33,360; Referee: Piero Giacomelli

11 November 2012 12	Milan	1–3	Fiorentina	Milan
15:00	Bonera (yellow card) 30'; Pazzini 59'; Ambrosini (yellow card) 61'; Mexès (yellow card) 68'	Report	Aquilani 10', (yellow card) 63'; Pizarro (yellow card) 24'; Roncaglia (yellow card) 33'; Valero (yellow card) 34', (goal) 37'; El Hamdaoui 87'	Stadium: San Siro; Attendance: 36,180; Referee: Andrea Romeo

18 November 2012 13	Napoli	2–2	Milan	Naples
15:00	Inler 5'; Insigne 30'; Cavani (yellow card) 52'; Campagnaro (yellow card) 63'; Cannavaro (yellow card) 64'	Report	Bojan 44', 82', (yellow card) 90'; Bojan (yellow card) 78'	Stadium: Stadio San Paolo; Attendance: 52,546; Referee: Mauro Bergonzi

24 November 2012 14	Milan	4–0	Juventus	Milan
15:00	Nocerino (yellow card) 17'; Bojan 31' (pen.), 45', 72'; Yepes 90+4'	Report	Isla (yellow card) 30'; Bonucci (yellow card) 43'; Marchisio (yellow card) 86'; Giovinco (yellow card) 90+3'	Stadium: San Siro; Attendance: 77,023; Referee: Nicola Rizzoli

2 December 2012 15	Catania	1–3	Milan	Catania
15:00	Legrottaglie 11'; Barrientos (yellow card) 41' (yellow-red card) 49'; Bellusci (yellow card) 86'; Rolín (yellow card) 90+5'	Report	Bojan 53', 90+2', (yellow card) 54'; Boateng 56', (red card) 90'; Amelia (yellow card) 60'	Stadium: Stadio Angelo Massimino; Attendance: 16,500; Referee: Daniele Orsato

7 December 2012 16	Torino	2–4	Milan	Turin
15:00	Santana 28'; Darmian (yellow card) 33'; Gazzi (yellow card) 62'; Masiello (yellow card) 63'; Bianchi 80'; Di Cesare (yellow card) 86'	Report	Robinho 40'; Nocerino 53'; Abate (yellow card) 55'; Pazzini 61'; Bojan 76'; Emanuelson (yellow card) 86'	Stadium: Stadio Olimpico di Torino; Attendance: 20,126; Referee: Andrea Romeo

16 December 2012 17	Milan	4–1	Pescara	Milan
15:00	Nocerino 1'; Abbruscato 51' (o.g.); Yepes (yellow card) 56'; Ambrosini (yellow card) 74'; Jonathas 79' (o.g.); Bojan 81'	Report	Modesto (yellow card) 40'; Togni (yellow card) 50'; Terlizzi 56'	Stadium: San Siro; Attendance: 42,520; Referee: Antonio Danilo Giannoccaro

22 December 2012 18	Roma	4–2	Milan	Rome
15:00	Burdisso 13', (yellow card) 54'; Osvaldo 24'; Lamela 30', 61'; Marquinhos (red card) 78'; Goicoechea (yellow card) 87'	Report	Yepes (yellow card) 15'; Ambrosini (yellow card) 58'; Mexès (yellow card) 81'; Pazzini 87' (pen.); Robinho 89'	Stadium: Stadio Olimpico; Attendance: 50,206; Referee: Gianluca Rocchi

6 January 2013 19	Milan	2–1	Siena	Milan
15:00	Ambrosini (yellow card) 49'; Robinho 67'; Pazzini (yellow card) 73', (goal) 80' (pen.)	Report	Ângelo (yellow card) 33'; Del Grosso (yellow card) 70'; Vergassola (yellow card) 83'; Felipe (yellow card) 85'; Neto (yellow card) 90'; Paolucci 87'	Stadium: San Siro; Attendance: 30,404; Referee: Gianpaolo Calvarese

13 January 2013 20	Sampdoria	0–0	Milan	Genoa
15:00	Gastaldello (yellow card) 87'	Report	Mexès (yellow card) 38'; Niang (yellow card) 73'	Stadium: Stadio Luigi Ferraris; Attendance: 24,544; Referee: Marco Guida

20 January 2013 21	Milan	2–1	Bologna	Milan
15:00	Pazzini 65', 82'; Abate (yellow card) 80'	Report	Diamanti (yellow card) 21'; Pazienza (yellow card) 32'; Cherubin (yellow card) 77'; Mexès 84' (o.g.)	Stadium: San Siro; Attendance: 30,031; Referee: Daniele Doveri

27 January 2013 22	Atalanta	0–1	Milan	Bergamo
15:00	Brivio (yellow card) 49' (yellow-red card) 59'; Raimondi (yellow card) 55'; Consigli (yellow card) 78'; Biondini (yellow card) 84'; Carmona (yellow card) 88'	Report	Bojan 29'; Pazzini (yellow card) 55'; Montolivo (yellow card) 71'; Mexès (yellow card) 78'; Abbiati (yellow card) 90+1'	Stadium: Stadio Atleti Azzurri d'Italia; Attendance: 18,805; Referee: Andrea Gervasoni

3 February 2013 23	Milan	2–1	Udinese	Milan
20:45	Montolivo (yellow card) 16'; Balotelli 25', 90+4' (pen.)	Report	Pinzi (yellow card) 13', (goal) 55'; Domizzi (yellow card) 38'; Lazzari (yellow card) 64'; Silva (yellow card) 84'	Stadium: San Siro; Referee: Davide Massa

10 February 2013 24	Cagliari	1–1	Milan	Quartu Sant'Elena
15:00	Ibarbo 45'; Murru (yellow card) 47'; Conti (yellow card) 51'; Astori (yellow card) 67' (yellow-red card) 81'; Dessena (yellow card) 68'	Report	Niang (yellow card) 38'; Mexès (yellow card) 45'; Ambrosini (yellow card) 63'; Balotelli 82' (pen.)	Stadium: Stadio Is Arenas; Attendance: 9,500; Referee: Antonio Danilo Giannoccaro

15 February 2013 25	Milan	2–1	Parma	Milan
15:00	Paletta 39' (o.g.); Zapata (yellow card) 74'; Balotelli 78'	Report	Marchionni (yellow card) 66'; Sansone 90+3'	Stadium: San Siro; Attendance: 33,077; Referee: Davide Massa

24 February 2013 26	Internazionale	1–1	Milan	Milan
15:00	Ranocchia (yellow card) 34'; Juan (yellow card) 43'; Schelotto 71'	Report	Mexès (yellow card) 12'; Bojan krkic 21'; Muntari (yellow card) 31'; Zapata (yellow card) 89'	Stadium: San Siro; Attendance: 80,000; Referee: Paolo Mazzoleni

2 March 2013 27	Milan	3–0	Lazio	Milan
15:00	Bojan (yellow card) 32', (goal) 40', 60'; Boateng 44' (yellow card) 58'; Yepes (yellow card) 90'	Report	Candreva (red card) 16'; Biava (yellow card) 47'; Radu (yellow card) 59'	Stadium: San Siro; Referee: Nicola Rizzoli

8 March 2013 28	Genoa	0–2	Milan	Genoa
15:00	Portanova (yellow card) 18'; Granqvist (yellow card) 35'; Bovo (yellow card) 65'; Antonelli (yellow card) 88'	Report	Pazzini 22'; Balotelli (yellow card) 25', (goal) 60'; Constant (yellow card) 32' (yellow-red card) 65'; Flamini (yellow card) 56'	Stadium: Stadio Luigi Ferraris; Attendance: 30,000; Referee: Antonio Damato

17 March 2013 29	Milan	2–0	Palermo	Milan
15:00	Balotelli 8' (pen.), 66'; Zapata (yellow card) 31'	Report	Muñoz (yellow card) 71'	Stadium: San Siro; Attendance: 41,584; Referee: Sebastiano Peruzzo

30 March 2013 30	Chievo	0–1	Milan	Verona
15:00	Dramé (yellow card) 27'; Dainelli (yellow card) 33' (yellow-red card) 78'; Cofie (yellow card) 50'; Cesar (yellow card) 62'; Andreolli (yellow card) 70'	Report	Balotelli (yellow card) 17'; Montolivo 25'	Stadium: Stadio Marc'Antonio Bentegodi; Referee: Domenico Celi

7 April 2013 31	Fiorentina	2–2	Milan	Florence
15:00	Tomović (red card) 40'; Cuadrado (yellow card) 44'; Ljajić 66' (pen.); Aquilani (yellow card) 67'; Pizarro 73' (pen.); Roncaglia (yellow card) 81'	Report	Montolivo 14', (yellow card) 35'; Muntari (yellow card) 45'; Flamini 62'; Balotelli (yellow card) 71'	Stadium: Stadio Artemio Franchi; Referee: Paolo Tagliavento

14 April 2013 32	Milan	1–1	Napoli	Milan
15:00	Bojan krkic 30', (red card) 72'; Pazzini (yellow card) 84'; Mexès (yellow card) 89'	Report	Pandev 33'; De Sanctis (yellow card) 64'; Maggio (yellow card) 72'; Cavani (yellow card) 75'; Britos (yellow card) 87'; Campagnaro (yellow card) 89'	Stadium: San Siro; Attendance: 72,024; Referee: Gianluca Rocchi

21 April 2013 33	Juventus	3–2	Milan	Turin
15:00	Vidal 57' (pen.), 62' (77)	Report	Bojan 1' (90+2); Zapata (yellow card) 66'; Mexès (yellow card) 71'	Stadium: Juventus Stadium; Attendance: 40,474; Referee: Luca Banti

28 April 2013 34	Milan	4–2	Catania	Milan
15:00	De Sciglio (yellow card) 9'; Flamini 45' (yellow card) 78'; Balotelli (yellow card) 72', (goal) 90+2' (pen.); Pazzini 74', 77'	Report	Bergessio (yellow card) 26', (goal) 65'; Legrottaglie 30', (yellow card) 41'; Frison (yellow card) 37'; Barrientos (yellow card) 78'; Marchese (yellow card) 86'	Stadium: San Siro; Attendance: 36,335; Referee: Davide Massa

5 May 2013 35	Milan	1–0	Torino	Milan
15:00	Mexès (yellow card) 49'; Muntari (yellow card) 73'; Boateng (yellow card) 74'; Balotelli 84', (yellow card) 85'	Report		Stadium: San Siro; Attendance: 43,000; Referee: Antonio Damato

8 May 2013 36	Pescara	0–4	Milan	Pescara
18:00	Rizzo (yellow card) 11'	Report	Balotelli 10' (pen.), 57'; Muntari 33'; Flamini 51'	Stadium: Stadio Adriatico; Attendance: 20,476; Referee: Carmine Russo

12 May 2013 37	Milan	0–0	Roma	Milan
20:45	Balotelli (yellow card) 40'; Muntari (yellow card) 41' (red card) 41'; Ambrosini (yellow card) 78'; Constant (yellow card) 93'	Report	Dodô (yellow card) 73'; Burdisso (yellow card) 88'; Totti (yellow card) 90' (red card) 90+2'	Stadium: San Siro; Attendance: 50,000; Referee: Gianluca Rocchi

19 May 2013 38	Siena	1–2	Milan	Siena
20:45	Terzi 25'; Terlizzi (yellow card) 45' (yellow-red card) 70'; Agra (yellow card) 81'; Vitiello (yellow card) 86'; Rubin (yellow card) 89'; Felipe (yellow card) 90'	Report	Ambrosini (yellow card) 62' (yellow-red card) 69'; De Sciglio (yellow card) 81'; Balotelli 84' (pen.); Mexès 87'	Stadium: Stadio Artemio Franchi – Montepaschi Arena; Attendance: 9,500; Referee: Mauro Bergonzi

=== Coppa Italia ===
For the 14th season in a row, Milan will start the Coppa Italia directly in the round of 16, as one of the eight best seeded teams.

10 January 2013 Round of 16	Milan	3–0	Reggina	Milan
21:00	Yepes 51'; Strasser (yellow card) 76'; Bojan 79'; Pazzini 81'	Report	Bombagi (yellow card) 45'; Freddi (yellow card) 71'	Stadium: San Siro; Referee: Gianpaolo Calvarese

15 January 2013 Quarter-finals	Juventus	2–1 (a.e.t.)	Milan	Turin
20:45	Giovinco 12'; Vidal (yellow card) 65'; Vučinić 95', (yellow card) 113'	Report	Bojan 6'; Mexès (yellow card) 17'; Boateng (yellow card) 30'; Montolivo (yellow card) 101'	Stadium: Juventus Stadium; Referee: Paolo Mazzoleni

=== UEFA Champions League ===
==== Group stage ====
Milan began their UEFA Champions League campaign in the group stage after finishing runner-up in the 2011–12 Serie A season. Due to their UEFA coefficient, they were seeded in Pot 1, among the best eight teams. The draw for the preliminary round took place in Montecarlo on Thursday, 30 August 2012. Milan were drawn against Spanish side Málaga, as well as Belgian and Russian champions, Anderlecht and Zenit Saint Petersburg respectively.

Pos	Team	Pld	W	D	L	GF	GA	GD	Pts	Qualification	MLG	MIL	ZEN	AND
1	(Spain) Málaga	6	3	3	0	12	5	+7	12	Advance to knockout phase	—	1–0	3–0	2–2
2	(Italy) Milan	6	2	2	2	7	6	+1	8	Advance to knockout phase	1–1	—	0–1	0–0
3	(Russia) Zenit Saint Petersburg	6	2	1	3	6	9	−3	7	Transfer to Europa League	2–2	2–3	—	1–0
4	(Belgium) Anderlecht	6	1	2	3	4	9	−5	5		0–3	1–3	1–0	—

Source: Soccerway

18 September 2012 1	Milan (Italy)	0–0	(Belgium) Anderlecht	Milan, Italy
20:45 CEST (UTC+02:00)	Flamini (yellow card) 84'; Mexès (yellow card) 90+2'	Report	Wasilewski (yellow card) 57'; Kljestan (yellow card) 79'	Stadium: San Siro; Attendance: 27,593; Referee: William Collum (Scotland)

3 October 2012 2	Zenit Saint Petersburg (Russia)	2–3	(Italy) Milan	Saint Petersburg, Russia
20:45 CEST (UTC+02:00)	Fayzulin (yellow card) 12'; Anyukov (yellow card) 35'; Hulk 45+2'; Shirokov 49', (yellow card) 87'; Hubočan (yellow card) 71'	Report	Emanuelson 13'; Bojan 16', (yellow card) 40'; Bonera (yellow card) 36'; Hubočan 75' (o.g.); Yepes (yellow card) 85'	Stadium: Petrovsky Stadium; Attendance: 21,703; Referee: Felix Brych (Germany)

24 October 2012 3	Málaga (Spain)	1–0	(Italy) Milan	Málaga, Spain
20:45 CEST (UTC+02:00)	Joaquín 64'; Iturra (yellow card) 67'	Report	Montolivo (yellow card) 12'; Constant (yellow card) 43'; Mexès (yellow card) 43'; Bonera (yellow card) 69'	Stadium: La Rosaleda Stadium; Attendance: 27,683; Referee: Pedro Proença (Portugal)

6 November 2012 4	Milan (Italy)	1–1	(Spain) Málaga	Milan, Italy
20:45 CET (UTC+01:00)	De Jong (yellow card) 34'; Emanuelson (yellow card) 43'; Montolivo (yellow card) 53'; Pato 73'		Eliseu 40'; Iturra (yellow card) 59'; Weligton (yellow card) 64'; Sánchez (yellow card) 64'	Stadium: San Siro; Attendance: 30,891; Referee: Howard Webb (England)

21 November 2012 5	Anderlecht (Belgium)	1–3	(Italy) Milan	Anderlecht, Belgium
20:45 CET (UTC+01:00)	Biglia (yellow card) 49'; Gillet (yellow card) 66'; Nuytinck (red card) 70'; De Sutter 78'	Report	Nocerino (yellow card) 41'; Bojan 47'; Mexès 71', (yellow card) 79'; Abbiati (yellow card) 84'; Pato 90+1'	Stadium: Constant Vanden Stock Stadium; Attendance: 19,803; Referee: Damir Skomina (Slovenia)

4 December 2012 6	Milan (Italy)	0–1	(Russia) Zenit Saint Petersburg	Milan, Italy
20:45 CET (UTC+01:00)	Flamini (yellow card) 58'; Robinho (yellow card) 87'	Report	Danny 35'; Lombaerts (yellow card) 43'; Hulk (yellow card) 46'; Alves (yellow card) 87'	Stadium: San Siro; Attendance: 29,508; Referee: Tony Chapron (France)

==== Knockout phase ====
===== Round of 16 =====
20 February 2013 First leg	Milan (Italy)	2–0	(Spain) Barcelona	Milan, Italy
20:45 CET (UTC+01:00)	Mexès (yellow card) 24'; Boateng 57'; Bojan 81'; Traoré (yellow card) 90+1'	Report	Busquets (yellow card) 55'; Piqué (yellow card) 57'	Stadium: San Siro; Attendance: 79,532; Referee: Craig Thomson (Scotland)

12 March 2013 Second leg	Barcelona (Spain)	4–0 (4–2 agg.)	(Italy) Milan	Barcelona, Spain
20:45 CET (UTC+01:00)	Messi 5', 40'; Villa 55'; Alba 90+2'	Report		Stadium: Camp Nou; Attendance: 94,944; Referee: Viktor Kassai (Hungary)

== Squad statistics ==
=== Appearances, goals and disciplinary record ===
Updated 30 June 2013.

No.	Pos.	Name	LS	LA	LG	CS	CA	CG	ES	EA	EG	TS	TA	TG	Yellow card	Double yellow card	Red card
1	GK	(Italy) Marco Amelia	10	11	0	1	1	0	1	1	0	12	13	0	1	0	0
2	DF	(Italy) Mattia De Sciglio	25	27	0	1	1	0	4	4	0	30	32	0	1	0	0
4	MF	(Ghana) Sulley Muntari	11	15	1	0	0	0	1	2	1	12	17	2	2	0	0
5	DF	(France) Philippe Mexès	25	25	1	1	1	0	6	6	1	32	32	2	14	0	0
7	FW	(Brazil) Robinho	11	23	2	1	1	0	0	2	0	12	26	2	1	0	0
8	MF	(Italy) Antonio Nocerino	20	26	2	0	0	0	2	3	0	22	29	2	4	0	0
9	FW	(Brazil) Alexandre Pato^{1}	3	4	0	0	0	0	1	3	2	4	7	2	0	0	0
10	MF	(Ghana) Kevin-Prince Boateng	25	29	2	1	1	0	6	6	1	32	36	3	6	1	1
11	FW	(Italy) Giampaolo Pazzini	15	30	15	2	2	0	4	4	0	21	36	15	6	0	0
12	MF	(Mali) Bakaye Traoré	1	7	0	0	1	0	0	1	0	1	9	0	1	0	0
13	DF	(Italy) Francesco Acerbi^{1}	5	6	0	2	2	0	2	2	0	8	10	0	0	0	0
14	MF	(Sierra Leone) Rodney Strasser^{1}	0	0	0	1	1	0	0	0	0	1	1	0	1	0	0
14	DF	(Poland) Bartosz Salamon^{2}	0	0	0	0	0	0	0	0	0	0	0	0	0	0	0
15	DF	(Algeria) Djamel Mesbah^{1}	1	1	0	0	0	0	1	1	0	2	2	0	0	0	0
16	MF	(France) Mathieu Flamini	15	18	4	1	1	0	3	3	0	19	22	4	5	0	0
17	DF	(Colombia) Cristián Zapata	22	23	0	1	1	0	4	4	0	27	28	0	5	2	0
18	MF	(Italy) Riccardo Montolivo	31	32	4	1	1	0	6	6	0	38	39	4	9	0	0
19	FW	(France) M'Baye Niang	9	20	0	0	2	1	1	2	0	10	24	1	2	0	0
20	DF	(Italy) Ignazio Abate	25	0	2	2	0	4	4	0	0	33	0	1	0	0	
21	MF	(Guinea) Kévin Constant	20	25	0	0	0	0	4	5	0	24	30	0	2	0	0
22	FW	(Spain) Bojan	5	19	3	1	2	0	4	5	0	10	27	3	1	0	0
23	MF	(Italy) Massimo Ambrosini	16	20	0	1	1	0	4	4	0	21	25	0	8	0	0
25	DF	(Italy) Daniele Bonera	13	13	0	0	0	0	4	4	0	17	17	0	7	0	0
28	MF	(Netherlands) Urby Emanuelson^{1}	8	12	1	2	2	0	5	5	1	15	19	2	2	0	0
32	GK	(Italy) Christian Abbiati	28	28	0	1	1	0	7	7	0	36	36	0	3	0	0
34	MF	(Netherlands) Nigel de Jong	10	12	1	0	0	0	4	4	0	14	16	1	4	0	0
35	DF	(Spain) Dídac Vilà	0	0	0	0	0	0	0	0	0	0	0	0	0	0	0
45	FW	(Italy) Mario Balotelli^{2}	12	13	12	0	0	0	0	0	0	12	13	12	3	0	0
55	MF	(Spain) Adrià Carmona^{1}	0	0	0	0	0	0	0	0	0	0	0	0	0	0	0
57	MF	(Italy) Mattia Valoti^{1}	0	0	0	0	0	0	0	0	0	0	0	0	0	0	0
59	GK	(Brazil) Gabriel	0	0	0	0	0	0	0	0	0	0	0	0	0	0	0
76	DF	(Colombia) Mario Yepes	13	14	0	1	1	1	1	3	0	15	18	1	8	0	0
77	DF	(Italy) Luca Antonini	5	6	0	1	1	0	2	2	0	8	9	0	1	0	0
81	DF	(Italy) Cristian Zaccardo^{2}	0	1	0	0	0	0	0	0	0	0	1	0	0	0	0
92	FW	(Italy) Stephan El Shaarawy	34	37	16	1	1	1	6	7	2	41	45	19	4	0	0
–	–	Own goals	–	-	2	-	–	0	-	–	1	-	–	3	-	-	-

Last updated: 28 October 2012.
Source: Competitions

^{1} Player left the club during the season
^{2} Player joined the club during the season

== Transfers ==
During the summer transfer window, Milan parted ways with four club legends: Gennaro Gattuso, Alessandro Nesta, Clarence Seedorf and Filippo Inzaghi. Mark van Bommel also decided to leave Milan to return to the Netherlands with PSV. The first inward transfers of the season saw Riccardo Montolivo join on a Bosman transfer from Fiorentina after having failed to complete the transfer in the previous year, while Bakaye Traoré joined from Ligue 1 side Nancy. Milan also acquired promising young goalkeeper Gabriel, who joined from Brazilian club Cruzeiro. He was followed by the arrivals of Francesco Acerbi, on co-ownership, and Kévin Constant on loan, the latter as a replacement for the injured Sulley Muntari, both from Genoa on the same day. On 14 July, Milan accepted a €42 million bid for defender Thiago Silva from Paris Saint-Germain. Three days later, PSG submitted a €23 million bid for Swedish forward Zlatan Ibrahimović, which Milan accepted. The next major transfer saw Giampaolo Pazzini transfer to Milan from crosstown rivals Internazionale and Antonio Cassano heading the opposite way, with an additional fee of around €7 million. The final days of the transfer window saw Milan reinforce the squad with 17-year-old striker M'Baye Niang from Caen, 21-year-old forward Bojan from Roma on loan and combative defensive midfielder Nigel de Jong from English champions Manchester City.

In the winter transfer window, Milan parted ways with long-time striker Alexandre Pato. They also traded co-ownership with Genoa for 50 percent of Francesco Acerbi's rights in exchange for 50 percent of Kévin Constant's rights. On the last day of the transfer window, Mario Balotelli signed for Milan after he was bought from Manchester City. Milan also sold veteran goalkeeper Ferdinando Coppola to Torino and bought youngster Bartosz Salamon from Serie B side Brescia.

=== In ===
Date	Pos.	Player	Age	Moving from	Fee	Notes
17 May 2012	MF	(Mali) Bakaye Traoré	27	(France) Nancy	Free	Effective from 1 July
17 May 2012	MF	(Italy) Riccardo Montolivo	27	(Italy) Fiorentina	Free	Effective from 1 July
24 May 2012	GK	(Brazil) Gabriel	19	(Brazil) Cruzeiro	€500,000	
21 June 2012	DF	(Italy) Francesco Acerbi	23	(Italy) Genoa	€4M	Co-ownership Deal
21 June 2012	MF	(Guinea) Kévin Constant	25	(Italy) Genoa	Loan	
22 June 2012	FW	(Italy) Stephan El Shaarawy	19	(Italy) Genoa	Undisclosed	Co-ownership Resolved
22 June 2012	FW	(Italy) Matteo Chinellato	20	(Italy) Genoa	Undisclosed	Co-ownership Resolved
22 June 2012	MF	(Portugal) Pelé	20	(Italy) Genoa	Undisclosed	Co-ownership Resolved
1 July 2012	MF	(Italy) Davide Di Gennaro	24	(Italy) Modena	Return from Loan	
1 July 2012	FW	(Italy) Gianmarco Zigoni	21	(Italy) Avellino	Return from Loan	
1 July 2012	FW	(Nigeria) Nnamdi Oduamadi	21	(Italy) Torino	Return from Loan	
1 July 2012	GK	(Italy) Ferdinando Coppola	34	(Italy) Torino	Return from Loan	
1 July 2012	DF	(Italy) Michelangelo Albertazzi	21	(Italy) Varese	Return from Loan	
1 July 2012	DF	(Brazil) Marcus Diniz	24	(Italy) Como	Return from Loan	
1 July 2012	DF	(Nigeria) Taye Taiwo	27	(England) Queens Park Rangers	Return from Loan	
1 July 2012	DF	(Spain) Dídac Vilà	23	(Spain) Espanyol	Return from Loan	
1 July 2012	DF	(Romania) Cristian Daminuţă	22	(Romania) Baia Mare	Return from Loan	
3 July 2012	GK	(Italy) Edoardo Pazzagli	23	(Italy) Fiorentina	Free	
8 August 2012	DF	(Colombia) Cristián Zapata	25	(Spain) Villarreal	Loan	Option to Fully Purchase
22 August 2012	FW	(Italy) Giampaolo Pazzini	28	(Italy) Internazionale	€7M + Antonio Cassano	
28 August 2012	FW	(France) M'Baye Niang	17	(France) Caen	Undisclosed	
29 August 2012	FW	(Spain) Bojan	21	(Spain) Barcelona	Loan	
30 August 2012	MF	(Netherlands) Nigel de Jong	27	(England) Manchester City	€5M	
17 January 2013	MF	(Italy) Riccardo Saponara	21	(Italy) Empoli	€4M	Co-ownership Deal
24 January 2013	DF	(Italy) Cristian Zaccardo	31	(Italy) Parma	Undisclosed	
31 January 2013	FW	(Italy) Mario Balotelli	22	(England) Manchester City	€21.5M	
31 January 2013	DF	(Poland) Bartosz Salamon	21	(Italy) Brescia	Undisclosed	

=== Out ===
Date	Pos.	Player	Age	Moving to	Fee	Notes
10 May 2012	DF	(Italy) Alessandro Nesta	36	(Canada) Montreal Impact	Free	
12 May 2012	FW	(Italy) Filippo Inzaghi	38	Unattached	Free	Retired
23 May 2012	GK	(Italy) Flavio Roma	37	(France) AS Monaco	Free	
23 May 2012	DF	(Italy) Gianluca Zambrotta	35	Unattached	Free	
23 May 2012	MF	(Italy) Gennaro Gattuso	34	(Switzerland) Sion	Free	
23 May 2012	MF	(Netherlands) Mark van Bommel	35	(Netherlands) PSV	Free	
7 June 2012	DF	(Italy) Massimo Oddo	36	Unattached	Free	Retired
21 June 2012	MF	(Netherlands) Clarence Seedorf	36	(Brazil) Botafogo	Free	
22 June 2012	MF	(Germany) Alexander Merkel	20	(Italy) Genoa	Undisclosed	Co-ownership Resolved
22 June 2012	DF	(Italy) Mario Sampirisi	19	(Italy) Genoa	Undisclosed	Co-ownership Resolved
22 June 2012	DF	(Italy) Nicola Pasini	21	(Italy) Genoa	Undisclosed	Co-ownership Resolved
22 June 2012	DF	(Italy) Matteo Darmian	22	(Italy) Torino	Undisclosed	Co-ownership Resolved
25 June 2012	GK	(Poland) Michał Miśkiewicz	23	(Poland) Wisła Kraków	Free	
26 June 2012	FW	(Ghana) Dominic Adiyiah	22	(Ukraine) Arsenal Kyiv	Undisclosed	
30 June 2012	MF	(Italy) Alberto Aquilani	27	(England) Liverpool	End of Loan	
30 June 2012	FW	(Argentina) Maxi López	28	(Italy) Catania	End of Loan	
14 July 2012	MF	(Italy) Davide Di Gennaro	24	(Italy) Spezia	Undisclosed	
14 July 2012	DF	(Brazil) Thiago Silva	27	(France) Paris Saint-Germain	€42M	
17 July 2012	FW	(Sweden) Zlatan Ibrahimović	30	(France) Paris Saint-Germain	€21M	
22 August 2012	FW	(Italy) Antonio Cassano	30	(Italy) Internazionale	Exchange for Giampaolo Pazzini	
3 January 2013	FW	(Brazil) Alexandre Pato	23	(Brazil) Corinthians	€15M	
25 January 2013	DF	(Algeria) Djamel Mesbah	28	(Italy) Parma	Undisclosed	
26 January 2013	DF	(Italy) Francesco Acerbi	24	(Italy) Genoa	50% of Kevin Constant's rights	Co-ownership Resolved
26 January 2013	GK	(Italy) Ferdinando Coppola	34	(Italy) Torino	Undisclosed	

=== Out on loan ===
Date	Pos.	Player	Age	Moving to	Until	Notes
4 July 2012	FW	(Italy) Gianmario Comi	20	(Italy) Reggina	30 June 2013	
5 July 2012	MF	(Italy) Luca Santonocito	21	(Italy) Renate	30 June 2013	
6 July 2012	GK	(Italy) Riccardo Piscitelli	18	(Italy) Carrarese	30 June 2013	
6 July 2012	MF	(Italy) Simone Calvano	18	(Italy) Verona	30 June 2013	
11 July 2012	FW	(Nigeria) Nnamdi Oduamadi	21	(Italy) Varese	30 June 2013	
11 July 2012	MF	(Italy) Luca Bertoni	20	(Italy) Südtirol	30 June 2013	
12 July 2012	FW	(Italy) Marco Ezio Fossati	19	(Italy) Ascoli	30 June 2013	
12 July 2012	DF	(Portugal) Ricardo Ferreira	19	(Italy) Empoli	30 June 2013	
16 July 2012	FW	(Italy) Gianmarco Zigoni	21	(Italy) Pro Vercelli	30 June 2013	
16 July 2012	MF	(Argentina) Alessio Innocenti	19	(Italy) Pro Vercelli	30 June 2013	
19 July 2012	MF	(Ghana) Edmund Hottor	19	(Italy) Virtus Lanciano	30 June 2013	
20 July 2012	FW	(Italy) Matteo Chinellato	20	(Italy) Tritium	30 June 2013	
22 July 2012	DF	(Brazil) Marcus Diniz	24	(Italy) Lecce	30 June 2013	Option to Fully Purchase
24 July 2012	DF	(Italy) Rodrigo Ely	18	(Italy) Reggina	30 June 2013	
27 July 2012	FW	(Slovenia) Uroš Palibrk	20	(Belgium) Lierse	30 June 2013	
27 July 2012	GK	(Italy) Filippo Perucchini	20	(Italy) Como	30 June 2013	
31 July 2012	DF	(Nigeria) Taye Taiwo	27	(Ukraine) Dynamo Kyiv	30 June 2013	Option to Fully Purchase
31 July 2012	DF	(Italy) Michelangelo Albertazzi	21	(Italy) Verona	30 June 2013	Option to Purchase in Co-ownership
31 July 2012	MF	(Portugal) Pelé	20	(Ukraine) Arsenal Kyiv	30 June 2013	
2 August 2012	MF	(Slovenia) Mitja Novinič	21	(Italy) Teramo	30 June 2013	
2 August 2012	DF	(Switzerland) Mattia Desole	20	(Italy) Monza	30 June 2013	
17 January 2013	MF	(Italy) Riccardo Saponara	20	(Italy) Empoli	30 June 2013	
24 January 2013	MF	(Italy) Mattia Valoti	19	(Italy) Albinoleffe	30 June 2013	
25 January 2013	MF	(Sierra Leone) Rodney Strasser	22	(Italy) Parma	30 June 2013	
31 January 2013	MF	(Netherlands) Urby Emanuelson	26	(England) Fulham	30 June 2013	
31 January 2013	MF	(Spain) Adrià Carmona	20	(Spain) Real Zaragoza	30 June 2013	
