= Accademia Jacopo Napoli =

Coordinates: 40.69653°N 14.70967°E

The Accademia Musicale Jacopo Napoli (English: Jacopo Napoli Academy) is a music institute in Cava de' Tirreni.

It was founded in 1987 by Felice Cavaliere and named after Jacopo Napoli, famous Neapolitan composer. It organizes Master classes in the major musical instruments as well as singing, string instruments and conducting. The music courses have been presented by the Academy Jacopo Napoli of Cava de’ Tirreni since 1987. Among the teachers at the Academy are Leonid Margarius, Sonig Tchakerian, Marco Fiorini, Gabriele Geminiani and others.

The Academy organizes also the Festival of Chamber Music "Le Corti dell'Arte", which takes place in August, where artists such as Michele Campanella, Maxence Larrieu, and François-Joël Thiollier have performed. The Festival takes place in the ancient courts of the noble palaces of the Old Town of Cava de' Tirreni.

For almost a decade, the Academy has organized a course of orchestral conducting held by Bruno Aprea; it aimed at the production of operas that have been performed in concert. During the past years, the Academy organized many events; one of the most important is the Amalfi Coast Music & Arts Festival in collaboration with the Center for Musical Studies in Washington. The Academy organized also manifold concert seasons and the International Singing Competition "Vissi d'Arte", in Eboli.

The activity of the Academy has been described in at least two Italian magazines and publications (see references).
