= Matteo Chinellato =

Italian professional footballer

Personal information
- Date of birth: 2 September 1991 (age 35)
- Place of birth: Treviso, Italy
- Height: 1.88 m (6 ft 2 in)
- Position: Forward

Team information
- Current team: Bassano

Youth career
- –2004: Casier–Dosson
- 2004–2005: Conegliano
- –2007: Cipriano–Catron
- 2007–2008: Venezia

Senior career*
Years	Team	Apps	(Gls)
2008–2009	Venezia	2	(0)
2009–2010	Fiorentina	0	(0)
2010–2011	Genoa	0	(0)
2010–2011	→ Reggiana (loan)	19	(1)
2011–2016	AC Milan	0	(0)
2011–2012	→ Südtirol (loan)	19	(3)
2012–2013	→ Tritium (loan)	17	(2)
2013–2014	→ Sorrento (loan)	11	(1)
2014	→ Cosenza (loan)	11	(1)
2014–2015	→ Südtirol (loan)	13	(0)
2015–2016	→ Cuneo (loan)	30	(12)
2016–2017	Como	26	(12)
2017–2019	Padova	19	(1)
2018	→ Alessandria (loan)	15	(1)
2019	→ Gubbio (loan)	18	(4)
2019–2020	Lecco	11	(1)
2020–2021	Imolese	9	(4)
2020–2021	→ Pistoiese (loan)	29	(5)
2021–2022	Trento	21	(1)
2022–2023	Sambenedettese	7	(3)
2023	Campodarsego	7	(1)
2023–2024	Monte Prodeco	15	(4)
2024–2025	Montecchio Maggiore	34	(8)
2025	Unione La Rocca Altavilla	8	(1)
2025–	Bassano	6	(0)

International career
2011	Italy U20	1	(0)
- * Club domestic league appearances and goals as of 22 February 2026

Matteo Chinellato (born 2 September 1991) is an Italian professional footballer who plays as a forward for Serie D club Bassano.

== Club career ==
=== Youth career ===
Born in Treviso, Veneto, Chinellato started his career in various Treviso clubs. Chinellato played for AC Casier–Dosson until 2004 (office in Casier frazione of Casier comune of the Province of Treviso, stadia in Dosson frazione of Casier). Chinellato was signed by Conegliano in 2004 but released in December 2004. Chinellato was the member of ASD Cipriano–Catron's Allievi B team (U16 team) in Veneto regional (Italian: Regionali) Allievi League Second Division (Italian: Fascia B) in 2006–07 season. The team was located in San Cipriano frazione of Roncade. Chinellato left for Venezia's Allievi U17 team in 2007–08 season, for Campionato Nazionale Allievi. The team entered the quarter-finals of the playoffs. Chinellato was promoted to the reserve (U20 team) in 2008–09 season, for Campionato Nazionale Dante Berretti, the Lega Pro version of the reserve league.

=== Venezia & Fiorentina ===
Chinellato started his professional career at the capital of Veneto region, in Venice. During his Venezia career, he was selected to Italy U20 Serie C team in 2009 Lega Pro Quadrangular Tournament on 20–22 January. He scored once and finished as the runner-up in that youth tournament. Before the tournament, Chinellato made his debut for Venezia on 11 January 2009. On 2 February 2009 Chinellato left for ACF Fiorentina for €100,000 (with Lorenzo Morelli moved to Venice in temporary deal for free). However, he was released on 19 November 2009. Chinellato only played 3 times for la Viola reserve, all in 2008–09 season.

=== Genoa ===
In January 2010 Chinellato was signed by Genoa and scored 8 goals for the reserve in half-season, as team top-scorer. Along with Stephan El Shaarawy and Antonino Ragusa, they were the protagonist for the reserve to win the reserve league title – Campionato Nazionale Primavera. All 3 attackers were left for Italian clubs in lower divisions in 2010–11 season in temporary deals (for free), which Chinellato was signed by the third division club Reggiana along with Matteo D'Alessandro. That season Genoa also signed Gianmarco Zigoni and Mattia Destro (both youth internationals centre forward born 1991), made Chinellato did not had chance in first team and youth team, and left for professional team to gain experience instead. However, Chinellato only made 2 starts for Reggiana in 2010–11 Lega Pro Prima Divisione. Despite not a regular player in professional matches, Chinellato received his only U20 call-up in February 2011 against Germany. He substituted Andrea Bertolacci in the first half and was substituted by Mattia Montini in the second half.

=== AC Milan ===
In July 2011, Chinellato followed the footsteps of El Shaarawy who joined AC Milan in June for €10 million (with Alexander Merkel moved to Genoa for €5 million).

Likes El Shaarawy and Merkel, Chinellato also left for Milan in co-ownership deal for €1.75 million with Nicola Pasini moved to Genoa (€1.65 million). That season Milan and Genoa formed four swap deals in total, (Note: The first swap deal was the bought back of Sokratis Papastathopoulos for €13M in May 2011 and the returns of Oduamadi, Strasser, Zigoni (3 players for €9.5 million) and Alberto Paloschi (€5M) plus the signing of Marco Amelia (€3.5M) and Kevin-Prince Boateng (another half for €7M).), which Pelé moved to Milan for €950,000 and Mario Sampirisi to Genoa for €1 million on 30 August 2011. Chinellato–Pasini–Pelé–Sampirisi deals made Milan paid Genoa just €50,000 in net.

Chinellato was immediately left for another third division club Südtirol. However, despite Chinellato made more starts (10 games), Chinellato scored 3 goals only in 2011–12 Lega Pro Prima Divisione.

On 1 June 2012, Genoa bought Pasini and Sampirisi outright; Chinellato and Pelé also moved to Milan outright. All 4 deals for the original price except €50,000 discount for Pelé (Note: as co-ownership income of €50,000) to make the 4 deals effectively a pure player swap.

On 19 July 2012, Chinellato joined Prima Divisione side Tritium on a loan deal.

On 27 July 2013, Chinellato signed for Seconda Divisione club Sorrento on another loan deal. On 21 January 2014 he was signed by Cosenza.

On 17 July 2014 he was re-signed by Südtirol in a 2-year loan.

On 31 August 2015 Chinellato was signed by Cuneo in a temporary deal.

=== Como ===
On 18 July 2016 Chinellato was signed by Calcio Como.

=== Padova ===
On 16 January 2019, he joined Gubbio on loan until the end of the 2018–19 season.

=== Lecco ===
On 9 July 2019, he signed a 2-year contract with Lecco.

=== Imolese ===
On 15 January 2020, he moved to Imolese. On 30 September 2020, he joined Pistoiese on a season-long loan.

=== Trento ===
On 28 July 2021, he joined Trento.

=== Sambenedettese ===
On 16 August 2022, Chinellato moved to Sambenedettese in Serie D.
