= Iacono =

Iacono (Italian pronunciation: [ˈjakono]) is a surname of Italian origin. Notable people with the surname include:

- Alessandro Iacono (born 1973), former Italian professional footballer
- David Iacono (born 2002), American actor
- Franck Iacono (born 1966), French freestyle swimmer
- Gianluca Iacono (born 1970), Italian voice actor
- Stanley Iacono, former mayor of Weehawken, NJ
- Maurizio Iacono, member of the Canadian rock band Kataklysm
- Norberto Iacono (1919–1985), Argentine footballer
- Paul Iacono, American actor
- Sal Iacono (born 1971), American comedian
- William Iacono, American psychologist

== See also ==
- Iacona
