= Valsesia (disambiguation) =

Valsesia may refer to:

- Valsesia, group of valleys in the north-east of Piedmont, Italy
- Fabio Valsesia (born 1981), Italian former soccer player
- Parco naturale Alta Valsesia, nature reserve\regional park in Piedmont, in Italy
