= Quattrini =

Quattrini is the surname of the following people:

- Alessandro Quattrini (b. 1974), retired Italian footballer
- Enrico Quattrini (1864-1950), Italian sculptor
- Gabriele Quattrini (b. 1996), Italian baseball player
- Massimo Quattrini (1968-), Italian footballer and trainer
- Paola Quattrini (b. 1944), Italian actress
- Selvaggia Quattrini (b. 1975), Italian actress
- Stefano Quattrini (b. 1959), Italian footballer

== See also ==
- Quattrino (pl. quattrini), obsolete Italian coin
