= De Martin =

De Martin may refer to:

- Albert De Martin, a canadian politician
- Massimo De Martin, an Italian professional footballer
- 190310 De Martin, an asteroid
