= Lambrughi =

Lambrughi is an Italian surname. Notable people with the surname include:

- Alessandro Lambrughi (born 1987), Italian footballer
- Marcello Lambrughi (born 1978), Italian footballer
- Mario Lambrughi (born 1992), Italian hurdler
