= Sgarbi =

Sgarbi is an Italian surname. Notable people with the surname include:

- Abdon Sgarbi (1903–1929), Italian footballer
- Alberto Sgarbi (born 1986), Italian rugby union player
- Filippo Sgarbi (born 1997), Italian footballer
- Vittorio Sgarbi (born 1952), Italian art critic and politician
