= Iacona =

Iacona (Italian pronunciation: [ˈjaːkona]) is a surname of Italian origin. Notable people with the surname include:

- Arturo Iacona (born 1957), Italian retired runner
- Isabel Iacona (born 1955), Argentine artist
- Nicholas Anthony Iacona (1968–1994), American pornographic actor better known as Joey Stefano

== See also ==
- Iacono
