= Rinaldini =

Rinaldini is an Italian last name diffused over all in Tuscany, Emilia-Romagna and Marche. Rinaldini is a diminutive of "Rinaldo" that stems from France. "Rinaldo" is "Reinaud" and "Renaud" in the French language, "Reinold" or "Reinhold" in the German and "Reginald" in the English language. Rinaldo refers to two different kind of figures: the consultant and/or the ballad singer.

- Aristide Rinaldini, (1844–1920), Italian Catholic cardinal
- Mattia Rinaldini, Italian footballer
