= Alessandro Piu =

Italian footballer (born 1996)

Personal information
- Date of birth: 30 July 1996 (age 30)
- Place of birth: Udine, Italy
- Height: 1.86 m (6 ft 1 in)
- Position: Forward

Team information
- Current team: Conegliano
- Number: 14

Youth career
- 2013–2015: Empoli

Senior career*
Years	Team	Apps	(Gls)
2015–2019	Empoli	23	(1)
2016–2017	→ Spezia (loan)	21	(3)
2018–2019	→ Carpi (loan)	2	(0)
2019	→ Pistoiese (loan)	14	(1)
2019–2021	Arezzo	40	(3)
2021–2023	Pro Patria	65	(15)
2023–2025	Pergolettese	30	(3)
2025	Sestri Levante	10	(1)
2025–	Conegliano	14	(7)

International career
2012–2013	Italy U17	6	(1)
2013–2014	Italy U18	4	(1)
2014–2015	Italy U19	6	(2)
2015	Italy U20	7	(0)
2015	Italy U21	1	(0)
- * Club domestic league appearances and goals as of 22 February 2026

Alessandro Piu (born 30 July 1996) is an Italian footballer who plays as a forward for Serie D club Conegliano.

== Club career ==
Piu is a youth exponent from Empoli. He made his team debut on 24 September 2015 against Atalanta. He started in the first eleven and was replaced after 45 minutes by Marko Livaja.

He went on loan to Spezia in Serie B for the 2016–2017 season.

On 21 August 2019, he signed with Arezzo.

On 6 August 2021, he joined Pro Patria as a free agent.

On 24 July 2023, Piu signed a two-year contract with Pergolettese.

== International career ==
On 13 November 2015, he made his debut with Italy U21 side, in a 2017 European Championship qualification match against Serbia.
