= Marcelo Aparicio Mateos =

German footballer

Personal information
- Date of birth: 25 December 1980 (age 45)
- Place of birth: Usingen, Germany
- Height: 1.85 m (6 ft 1 in)
- Position: Midfielder

Team information
- Current team: Padova (Team leader)

Senior career*
Years	Team	Apps	(Gls)
1998–2000	Pievigina	53	(7)
2000–2001	San Donà	19	(1)
2001–2003	Pievigina	22	(4)
2003–2004	Conegliano	31	(6)
2004–2005	Portogruaro	10	(0)
2005–2008	Bassano Virtus	71	(15)
2007–2008	Venezia	16	(0)
2008–2010	Alessandria	44	(7)
2010–2013	Bassano Virtus	82	(8)
2013–2014	Pordenone	18	(4)
- * Club domestic league appearances and goals

Marcelo Aparicio Mateos (born 25 December 1980 in Usingen) is a retired footballer. He is currently the team leader of Padova.

== After retirement ==
After Mateos retired in the summer 2014, he became the new team leader of the first squad. He remained in the club until 2016, before joining Padova in the summer 2016, also as a team leader.

== Appearances on football series ==
Lega Pro Prima Divisione : 64 (10)

Lega Pro Seconda Divisione : 108 (12)

Serie D : 122 (25)

Total : 294 (47)
