= Marco Gaeta =

Italian footballer

Personal information
- Date of birth: 10 February 1992 (age 34)
- Place of birth: Milan, Italy
- Height: 1.85 m (6 ft 1 in)
- Position: Forward

Team information
- Current team: Roma City

Youth career
- Milan
- 2011: → Varese (loan)

Senior career*
Years	Team	Apps	(Gls)
2011–2014	Milan	0	(0)
2011–2013	→ Renate (loan)	59	(11)
2013–2014	→ Teramo (loan)	23	(1)
2014–2015	Messina	5	(0)
2015	Monza	2	(0)
2015–2016	Inveruno		
2016–2017	Sanremese	29	(9)
2017–2018	Gozzano	14	(3)
2018–2019	Chieri	27	(12)
2019	Avezzano	15	(3)
2019–2020	Latina	7	(1)
2020–2021	Bra	18	(6)
2021	Casatese	9	(0)
2021	Olginatese	9	(2)
2021–2022	PDHAE	20	(0)
2022	Caronnese	13	(1)
2022–2023	Vis Artena	14	(2)
2023	Pro Novara		
2023–2024	Roma City	6	(0)
2024-	Imperia	6	(0)

International career
2007–2008	Italy U-16	5	(0)
2008	Italy U-17	1	(0)
- * Club domestic league appearances and goals as of 7 May 2023

Marco Gaeta (born 10 February 1992) is an Italian professional footballer who plays as a forward for Serie D club Roma City.

== Club career ==
In 2017–18 season Gaeta was signed by Serie D club Gozzano. He was part of the starting lineup with the Group A champion in the grand scudetto playoffs. However, he missed the semi-final. In 2019–20 season play for Serie D club Avezzano. In 2024-25 he played for SSD Imperia.
