= Enrico Cortese =

Italian footballer (born 1985)

Personal information
- Date of birth: 10 August 1985 (age 41)
- Place of birth: Bassano del Grappa, Italy
- Height: 1.81 m (5 ft 11 in)
- Position: Midfielder

Team information
- Current team: Morro d'Oro

Youth career
- 2000–2001: A.C. Milan
- 2001–2003: Verona
- 2003–2004: A.C. Milan

Senior career*
Years	Team	Apps	(Gls)
2004–2008	A.C. Milan	0	(0)
2004–2005	→ Aglianese (loan)	20	(2)
2005–2006	→ SPAL (loan)	9	(0)
2006–2007	→ Viterbese (loan)	25	(2)
2007–2008	→ Pizzighettone (loan)	25	(1)
2008–2009	Flaminia Civita Castellana	?	(?)
2009	Monterotondo	?	(?)
2009–	Morro d'Oro	?	(?)
Total		79	(5)

International career
2001	Italy U15	1	(0)
2003	Italy U18	1	(0)
- * Club domestic league appearances and goals

Enrico Cortese (born 1985) is an Italian footballer.

== Biography ==
Born in Bassano del Grappa, Veneto, Cortese spent 2000–01 season at A.C. Milan youth team and played at 2001 Torneo Città di Arco. He then left for Veneto club Verona. In July 2003, he was transferred back to A.C. Milan in co-ownership deal, in exchange with ex-Milan team-mate Stefano Pastrello. Since 2004–05 season, he was loaned to Serie C2 clubs.

In the 2008–09 season, he joined Serie D side Flaminia Civita Castellana, then Monterotondo in the next season. In December 2009, he joined Morro d'Oro.
