= Stefano Pastrello =

Italian footballer

Personal information
- Full name: Stefano Pastrello
- Date of birth: 1 January 1984 (age 42)
- Place of birth: Camposampiero, Italy
- Height: 1.78 m (5 ft 10 in)
- Position: Right midfielder

Youth career
- ?–2003: A.C. Milan

Senior career*
Years	Team	Apps	(Gls)
2003	A.C. Milan	1	(0)
2003–2008	Verona	0	(0)
2003–2004	→ Martina (loan)	2	(0)
2004–2005	→ Portogruaro (loan)	17	(1)
2006	→ Modica (loan)	10	(0)
2006–2007	→ Poggibonsi (loan)	9	(0)
2008–2010	Este	61	(4)
2010–2011	San Paolo Padova	31	(0)
2011–2012	Real Vicenza		
2012–2013	Kras	33	(1)

International career
2000	Italy U16	8	(0)
- * Club domestic league appearances and goals

Stefano Pastrello (born 1 January 1984) is an Italian footballer.

== Biography ==
Born in Camposampiero, Veneto, Pastrello started his career at Lombard club A.C. Milan. On the last league match of 2002–03 Serie A season (also the match before the 2003 UEFA Champions League Final and 2003 Coppa Italia Final), Pastrello along with 10 others Primavera team players were call-up to the match as starters and bench player. He substituted Catilina Aubameyang in the 61st minutes. The match Piacenza won Milan 4-2, as Milan only filled first team backup player likes Valerio Fiori and Primavera youth team player. On 30 June 2003, he was transferred to Verona in co-ownership deal, in exchange with Enrico Cortese. (who also from Veneto and was a teammate at AC Milan youth team 2000-01)

He failed to make a single league appearances for Verona, and was loaned to Martina, Portogruaro, Modica and Poggibonsi of Serie C1 & Serie C2. In the last season, the played once for Verona at Coppa Italia Serie C. In 2008-09 season, he left for Veneto side Este at Serie D.
