= Francesco De Francesco =

Italian footballer

Personal information
- Date of birth: 21 September 1977 (age 49)
- Place of birth: Tortora, Italy
- Height: 1.77 m (5 ft 10 in)
- Position: Striker

Youth career
- 1992–1995: Milan

Senior career*
Years	Team	Apps	(Gls)
1995–1997	Prato	46	(9)
1997–1998	Lecce	19	(0)
1998	Salernitana	0	(0)
1999	Cosenza	13	(4)
1999	Salernitana	1	(0)
2000–2001	Cosenza	31	(5)
2001–2002	Treviso	20	(3)
2002–2003	Genoa	21	(4)
2003–2004	Como	10	(1)
2004–2005	SPAL	9	(0)
2005–2006	Cremonese	6	(0)
Total		176	(26)

International career
1992	Italy U-15	4	(1)
1993–1994	Italy U-16	3	(1)
1995	Italy U-17	3	(2)
1994–1996	Italy U-18	15	(10)
- * Club domestic league appearances and goals

Francesco De Francesco (born 21 September 1977) is an Italian retired professional footballer who played as a striker.

De Francesco played 19 games in the 1997–98 season for U.S. Lecce in the Italian Serie A.

De Francesco represented the Italy U-17 side at the 1993 FIFA U-17 World Championship.
