= Lorenzo Rossetti =

Italian footballer

Personal information
- Date of birth: 1 July 1980 (age 46)
- Place of birth: Melzo, Italy
- Height: 1.76 m (5 ft 9 in)
- Position: Midfielder

Youth career
- 1995–1999: Milan

Senior career*
Years	Team	Apps	(Gls)
1999–2003	Milan	0	(0)
2000–2001	→ Viterbese (loan)	30	(2)
2001–2003	→ Padova (loan)	52	(2)
2003–2004	Genoa	0	(0)
2003–2004	→ Como (loan)	40	(1)
2004–2006	Cesena	40	(1)
2006–2007	Triestina	37	(3)
2008–2011	Ravenna	111	(5)
2011–2012	Triestina	23	(3)
2012–2013	Caravaggio		

International career
1995	Italy U-15	3	(0)
1998	Italy U-17	4	(0)
1998–1999	Italy U-18	10	(0)
- * Club domestic league appearances and goals

Lorenzo Rossetti (born 1 July 1980) is an Italian former footballer who played as a midfielder.

== Football career ==
Rossetti started his career at AC Milan. After graduating from the youth team, he was loaned to Serie C1 clubs. In summer 2003, he was signed by Genoa in co-ownership deal, but he was loaned to Como immediately.

In the next season, he was bought by Cesena. He then played for Triestina and Ravenna since January 2008.

He signed a contract with Ravenna until 2010.
