= Simone Bonomi =

Italian former association footballer

Personal information
- Full name: Simone Bonomi
- Date of birth: 8 November 1980 (age 45)
- Place of birth: Milan, Italy
- Height: 1.77 m (5 ft 10 in)
- Position: Midfielder

Youth career
- 1997–1999: AC Milan

Senior career*
Years	Team	Apps	(Gls)
1999–2001	Prato	50	(4)
2001–2002	Avellino	1	(0)
2002	→ Poggibonsi (loan)	15	(0)
2002–2006	Siena	10	(0)
2004	→ Chievo (loan)	2	(0)
2004–2005	→ Napoli (loan)	19	(0)
2005–2006	→ Verona (loan)	28	(0)
2006–2008	Crotone	53	(1)
2008–2009	Bari	15	(0)
2009–2010	Perugia	17	(0)
2010–2011	Alessandria	28	(0)
2011–2013	Sorrento	53	(0)

International career
1996	Italy U-15	9	(0)
1996–1997	Italy U-16	8	(0)
1998	Italy U-17	3	(0)

Managerial career
- 2014–2015: Empoli (technical coach)
- 2015–2018: Napoli (video analyst)
- 2019–2021: Benevento (technical coach)
- 2021–: Genoa (technical coach)
- * Club domestic league appearances and goals as of 15 June 2012

Simone Bonomi (born 8 November 1980) is an Italian former association footballer who played as a midfielder.

== Career ==
Bonomi started his career at AC Milan youth teams. In 1999, he was signed by Serie C2 club Prato in co-ownership bid. He played 50 times in the league, and also played 5 times in the playoff (2000, 2001). In summer 2001, he joined Avellino of Serie C1 in joint-ownership bid. In January 2002, he joined Poggibonsi of Serie C2 on loan, and also played once in relegation playoff.

=== Siena ===
In summer 2002, Bonomi joined A.C. Siena of Serie B. He never became a regular of the team, although made his Serie A debut on 25 October 2003 against US Lecce. He played 5 times in Serie A before left for Serie A rival Chievo on loan. In 2004–05 and 2005–06, Bonomi was loaned to Napoli (Serie C1) and Verona (Serie B) respectively. He also played 4 times for Napoli in Serie C1 playoff.

=== Crotone, Bari & Perugia ===
In summer 2006, he joined F.C. Crotone and followed the team relegated to Serie C1. He played twice in Serie C1 playoff for Crotone. In July 2008, he joined A.S. Bari of Serie B, signed a 2-year contract.

In August 2009, he signed a 1-year contract with Perugia.

=== Going south: Sorrento ===
On 25 July 2011 Bonomi signed a 2-year deal that will keep him with the club until 2013.

As of December 2011 he has made 13 appearances for the club and is sticking to his (earlier) word that he had come to the club to improve, by turning in some commendable appearances.

== Honours ==
Siena

- Serie B winner: 2003

Bari

- Serie B winner: 2009

Napoli

- Serie C1 playoff runner-up: 2005

Prato

- Serie C2 playoff runner-up: 2001
