= Riccardo Caraglia =

Italian footballer (born 1989)

Personal information
- Date of birth: 22 January 1989 (age 37)
- Place of birth: Bollate, Italy
- Position: Midfielder

Team information
- Current team: Verbania

Youth career
- 2002–2008: Milan

Senior career*
Years	Team	Apps	(Gls)
2008–2009	Pizzighettone	4	(0)
2009–2010	Olginatese		
2010	Oltrepò	11	(0)
2010–2011	Cantù San Paolo		
2011–	Verbania		

International career^{‡}
2004–2005	Italy U-16	2	(0)
2005	Italy U-17	2	(0)
- * Club domestic league appearances and goals as of June 2010 ‡ National team caps and goals as of 4 September 2005

Riccardo Caraglia (born 22 January 1989) is an Italian professional footballer who plays as a midfielder for Serie D club Verbania.

He made his professional debut in the 2008–09 season for Pizzighettone.
