= Gianmarco Zigoni =

Italian footballer (born 1991)

Personal information
- Date of birth: 10 May 1991 (age 35)
- Place of birth: Verona, Italy
- Height: 1.90 m (6 ft 3 in)
- Position: Forward

Team information
- Current team: Conegliano
- Number: 91

Youth career
- Opitergina
- Treviso

Senior career*
Years	Team	Apps	(Gls)
2008–2009	Treviso	18	(2)
2009–2010	AC Milan	1	(0)
2010–2011	Genoa	0	(0)
2011	→ Frosinone (loan)	6	(1)
2011–2018	AC Milan	0	(0)
2011–2012	→ Avellino (loan)	30	(11)
2012–2013	→ Pro Vercelli (loan)	11	(1)
2013	→ Avellino (loan)	10	(6)
2013–2014	→ Lecce (loan)	22	(7)
2014–2015	→ Monza (loan)	13	(0)
2015–2017	→ SPAL (loan)	88	(33)
2017–2018	→ Venezia (loan)	40	(6)
2018–2022	Venezia	23	(4)
2020–2021	→ Novara (loan)	19	(2)
2021	→ Mantova (loan)	16	(1)
2022	Virtus Verona	14	(4)
2022–2023	Juve Stabia	27	(3)
2023–2024	Virtus Verona	15	(2)
2024–2025	Taranto	20	(3)
2025	Union Clodiense Chioggia	13	(2)
2026–	Conegliano	6	(3)

International career^{‡}
2009	Italy U-18	4	(1)
2009–2010	Italy U-19	5	(4)
2009–2011	Italy U-20	2	(1)
- * Club domestic league appearances and goals as of 22 February 2026 ‡ National team caps and goals as of 20 April 2017

Gianmarco Zigoni (born 10 May 1991) is an Italian professional footballer who plays as a forward for Serie D club Conegliano.

== Club career ==
=== Early career ===
Raised in Oderzo, Zigoni started playing football with local team Opitergina, before joining Treviso's youth system, where he scored more than one hundred goals. He made his professional debut with the club in a Serie B game against Ancona on 26 January 2009, aged 17. The match ended in a 2–1 loss for Treviso, with Zigoni scoring their lone goal. He scored his second goal only four days later, in a 3–2 win against Brescia. The young striker went on to make a total of 18 appearances for Treviso in the 2008–09 season, being included 8 times in the starting line-up.

=== AC Milan ===
Coming to the attention of several Serie A clubs, such Fiorentina, Inter Milan and Juventus, Zigoni was eventually signed by AC Milan at the beginning of the 2009–10 season, for €1.3 million. He became a regular of their youth team, scoring a total of 19 goals in league and cup games. In particular, he scored in both legs of the Coppa Italia Primavera final, as Milan defeated Palermo 3–1 on aggregate to lift the trophy 25 years after the club's last success in the competition.

As for the first team, Zigoni made only one appearance during the season. He came off the bench in the final minutes of a league game against Lazio, which ended in 1–1 draw, on 28 March 2010.

=== Genoa ===
In July 2010, Zigoni was transferred to Genoa in co-ownership for €3.75 million, as part of the deal that saw defender Sokratis Papastathopoulos join Milan. With the youth team of his new club Zigoni scored two goals in the Supercoppa Primavera, as Genoa defeated 5–0 his former Milan teammates to secure the trophy. However, he failed to get any first-team appearances in his first months at the club.

Subsequently, on 29 January 2011, Zigoni was sent out on loan to Serie B club Frosinone. In his short stint with the club, he made a mere six appearances with a single goal, and Frosinone ended being relegated to the third tier at the end of the season.

=== AC Milan return and loans ===
On 24 May 2011, AC Milan re-acquired the second half of Zigoni from Genoa for the same fee, before being sent on loan to Avellino for the season. Next season he was sent on another loan spell to Serie B club Pro Vercelli. However, during the January transfer window he was called back and sent on a second loan spell to Avellino. Avellino promoted to Serie B at the end of season.

On 29 July 2013, he was signed by Italian third division club Lecce, re-joining teammate Giacomo Beretta and Marcus Diniz. Next season, he moved to Monza, once again on loan. On 8 January 2015, Zigoni was released by Monza. He was signed by SPAL on loan. The loan was extended on 13 July 2015, and again on 15 July 2016.

=== Venezia ===
On 10 August 2017, Zigoni was signed by Serie B side Venezia, on a season-long loan deal with an obligation to buy.

=== Serie C ===
On 19 September 2020, he joined Novara on loan. On 30 January 2021, he was sub-loaned to Mantova.

On 31 January 2022, Zigoni was sold to Serie C club Virtus Verona on a permanent transfer.

On 9 September 2022, Zigoni moved to Juve Stabia on a one-season contract.

On 24 August 2023, Zigoni returned to Virtus Verona for one year.

On 26 August 2024, Zigoni joined Taranto.

== International career ==
Zigoni won his first international cap in February 2009, shortly after his debut in Serie B with Treviso, being called up by Italy U-20 for a game against Austria. Italy lost 2–1, with Zigoni himself scoring their lone goal.

Zigoni went on to be selected also at under-18 and under-19 level, being capped a total of 10 times and scoring 5 goals. Among the 5 goals, 3 of them was from 3 substitute appearances in 2010 UEFA European Under-19 Football Championship qualification. However Zigoni was dropped out from the squad for the elite round and the final tournament as the team already had Mattia Destro, Fabio Borini and Nicolao Dumitru as centre forwards.

== Personal life ==
Zigoni was born in Verona, the son of former Juventus, Roma, and Hellas Verona striker Gianfranco Zigoni and grandnephew of former Napoli midfielder Pierluigi Ronzon.

== Career statistics ==
As of match played 24 January 2013

Appearances and goals by club, season and competition
Club	Season	League		National cup		Europe (Note: Includes UEFA Champions League.)		Other		Total	
Club	Season	Apps	Goals	Apps	Goals	Apps	Goals	Apps	Goals	Apps	Goals
Treviso	2008–09	18	2	0	0	–		–		18	2
AC Milan	2009–10	1	0	0	0	0	0	–		1	0
Genoa	2010–11	0	0	0	0	–		–		0	0
Frosinone (loan)	2011	6	1	0	0	–		–		6	1
Avellino (loan)	2011–12	30	11	0	0	–		–		30	11
Pro Vercelli (loan)	2012–13	11	1	1	0	–		–		12	1
Avellino (loan)	2013	0	0	0	0	–		–		0	0
Career total		66	16	1	0	0	0	0	0	67	16
