= Mauro Gilardi =

Italian footballer

Personal information
- Date of birth: 21 December 1982 (age 43)
- Place of birth: Lecco, Italy
- Height: 1.85 m (6 ft 1 in)
- Position: Midfielder

Youth career
- Milan

Senior career*
Years	Team	Apps	(Gls)
2001–2002	Gubbio	31	(1)
2002–2003	Sassari Torres	11	(0)
2003–2004	Pavia	18	(0)
2004–2006	Biellese	58	(6)
2006–2009	Olbia	96	(1)
2009–2010	Alghero	16	(0)
2010	San Marino	17	(0)
2010–2011	Poggibonsi	18	(0)
2011	Monterotondo	8	(0)
2011–2013	Civita Castellana	54	(1)
2013–	Matelica	0	(0)

International career
1999	Italy U-17	1	(0)
- * Club domestic league appearances and goals

Mauro Gilardi (born 21 December 1982) is an Italian professional football player.
