= Mario Stancanelli =

Italian footballer

Personal information
- Date of birth: 11 June 1977 (age 49)
- Place of birth: Treviso, Italy
- Height: 1.86 m (6 ft 1 in)
- Position: Defender

Youth career
- Milan

Senior career*
Years	Team	Apps	(Gls)
1995–1996	Milan	0	(0)
1996–1997	Prato	19	(1)
1997–1999	Livorno	36	(1)
1999–2000	Prato	17	(1)
2000–2001	Triestina	10	(0)
2001–2003	Pordenone	48	(0)
2003–2006	Cittadella	88	(0)
2006–2007	Padova	14	(0)
2007	Sassuolo	9	(0)
2008	Bassano Virtus	3	(0)

International career
1994–1995	Italy U-18	6	(0)
- * Club domestic league appearances and goals

Mario Stancanelli (born 11 June 1977 in Treviso) is a retired Italian professional football player.
