= Isabel Iacona =

Argentine artist (born 1955)

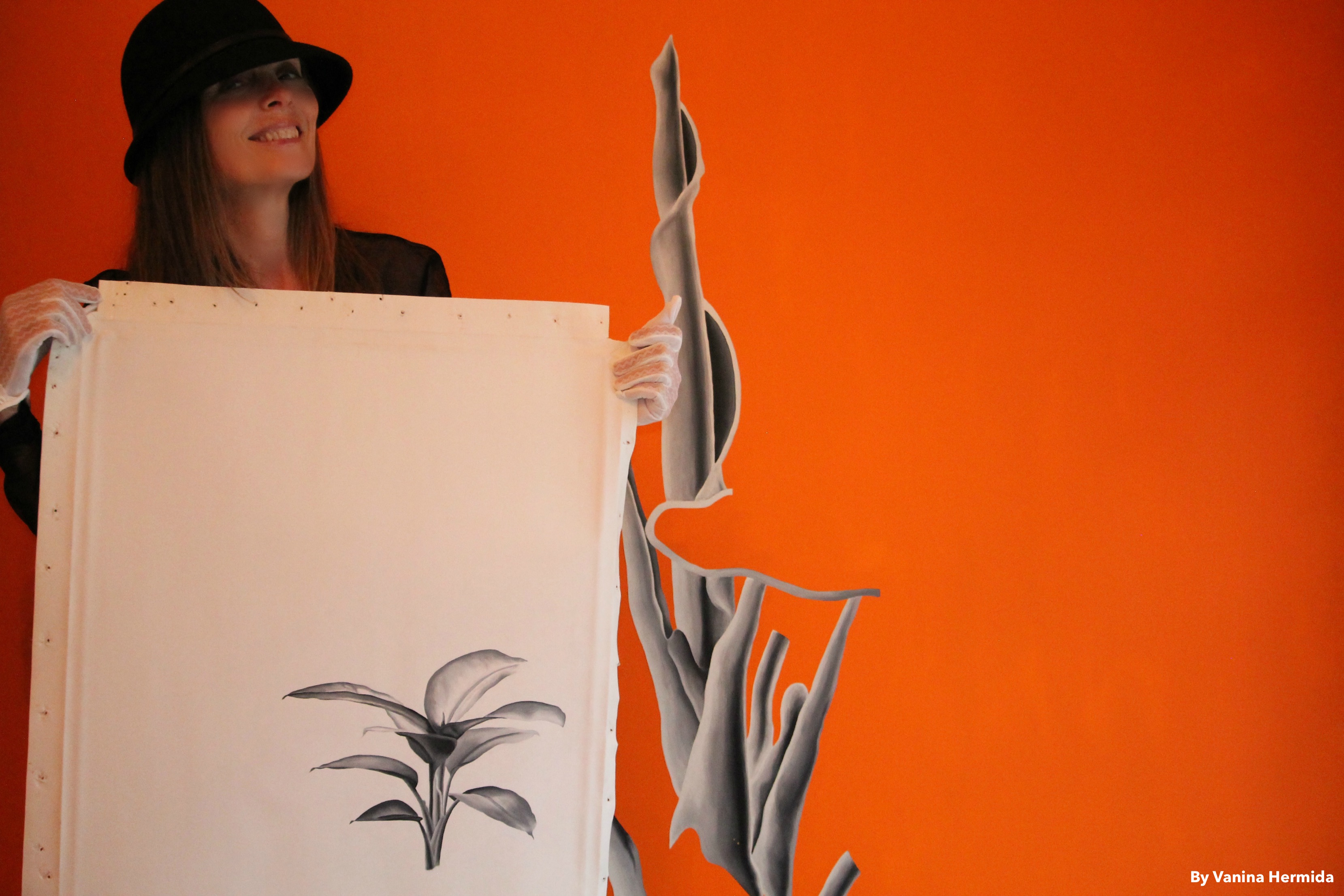
- Iacona with her works Reflections (2016; background) and 'Difenbacchia (2003; front)
- Born: 2 January 1955 (age 71); Buenos Aires, Argentina
- Known for: Visual Arts: Painting, Landscaping, Content Creator
- Children: Vanina Hermida
- Website: https://isabeliacona.com/

Isabel Iacona (born Buenos Aires, 1955) is an Argentine artist known for her detailed paintings of enlarged flowers and pop portraits of people and pets. She uses several mediums: oil on canvas, mixed techniques, watercolors and drawings. Her works have been commissioned in Europe and the Americas and she has lived in several countries.

== Childhood and education ==
As a child, Iacona learnt drawing with the Argentine Informalist artist Enrique Barilari, a friend of her father, Mario Iacona. Due to her father's job at a shipping company, the family moved frequently. She was later mentored by Leopoldo Presas, a member of the Academia Nacional de Bellas Artes de Argentina (National Academy of Fine Arts) and President of Sociedad Argentina de Artistas Plásticos. She also studied with Julio Güero, Maria Luisa Manasero, and Ana Eckell, who represented Argentina at 1997 Venice Biennale. She completed her school education at Northlands School and got her college degree at the Santa Ana School of Fine Arts in Buenos Aires in 1980. Later Iacona attended the Sorbonne in Paris.

== Career ==
During the 80s, Iacona moved to Punta del Este, Uruguay where she worked as a professional landscape designer planning and designing gardens and parks. This later became the basis of her floral art. She would work during the day, and paint at night. Her flowers are a synthesis of what she sees, rather than photorealistic renditions of her subjects.

In the late 80s Iacona moved back to Argentina where she started showing her paintings in Buenos Aires galleries. She also participated in the Centro de Arte y Comunicación (CAYC) Biennal organized by art critic Jorge Glusberg. In 1990, the Argentine Museo Nacional de Arte Decorativo selected one of her works, Sunset Flowers, as a state present to China. It became one of the first works by an Argentine artist in the Hangzhou Art Center's collection.

In 1992 she moved to Kinsale, Ireland to participate in a collective exhibition which lead to a year of work there. In 1993, she moved to Paris to work on her flower artworks and commissioned portraits. Her work then took her to America where she first lived in Austin, Texas, where she worked on a site-specific work for a Catholic chapel. After Austin, she spent two years in New Orleans, before moving to New York in 1996 where she continued to work till 1999. In 1998, one of her works was selected to participate in the Salón Nacional de Artes Plásticas at Palais de Glace, Buenos Aires. That year, the exhibition was held in the city of Paraná, Entre Ríos.

With the nomination for Salón Nacional, she traveled to Argentina and decided to stay and reconnect with her Argentine roots and fellow artists. She studied aesthetics with professor and researcher Lucas Salvador Fragasso. "El debate estético contemporáneo" (Contemporary Aesthetics Debate) evolved around concepts such as aesthetic experience, artistic autonomy, artwork analysis based on philosophic texts from Adorno, Benjamin, Heidegger and others such as Hal Foster, Georges Didi-Huberman and Rosalind Krauss. In 2000 she gave birth to her daughter Vanina Hermida. During that period, she started painting flowers on larger canvases and many of her works focused on pop portraits of children, commissioned by friends and others. By 2014, requests for commissioned works from Europe had accumulated and she and her daughter moved to London, returning to Argentina in 2016.

== Recognitions ==
- LXXXVII Salón Nacional de Artes Plásticas, Secretaría de Cultura de la Presidencia de la Nación. Painting and Sculpture. Palais de Glace. Selected artist, 1998. Exhibited at Museo Provincial de Bellas Artes de Paraná, Argentina.

== Museums ==
- Museo Nacional de Arte Decorativo, National Museum of Decorative Arts Buenos Aires, Argentina
- New Orleans Museum of Art, New Orleans, USA
- Randoll Hall, Natchez, Louisiana, USA
- Hangzhou Museum of Art, Hangzhou, China
