= Federico Piazza =

Italian footballer

Personal information
- Date of birth: 2 March 1987 (age 39)
- Place of birth: Albenga, Italy
- Height: 1.78 m (5 ft 10 in)
- Position: Midfielder

Youth career
- 2003–2006: Milan

Senior career*
Years	Team	Apps	(Gls)
2005–2008	Milan	0	(0)
2006–2008	→ Cremonese (loan)	2	(0)
2008	Massese	3	(0)
2008–2009	La Chaux-de-Fonds	20	(0)

International career
2003	Italy U-16	9	(0)
2003–2004	Italy U-17	6	(0)
2006	Italy U-19	2	(0)
- * Club domestic league appearances and goals

Federico Piazza (born 2 March 1987 in Albenga) is an Italian professional football player who is currently unattached.
