= Enrico Malatesta =

Italian footballer (born 1976)

Personal information
- Full name: Enrico Maria Malatesta
- Date of birth: 25 March 1976 (age 50)
- Place of birth: Milan, Italy
- Height: 1.84 m (6 ft 0 in)
- Position: Goalkeeper

Youth career
- 1991: Milan
- 1992: Pro Sesto
- 1992: Milan

Senior career*
Years	Team	Apps	(Gls)
1996–1999	Pro Sesto	63	(0)
1999–2000	Alessandria	40	(0)
2001	Pro Sesto	16	(0)
2001–2002	Alessandria	31	(0)
2002–2007	Legnano	159	(0)
2007–2008	Pro Vercelli	20	(0)
2008–2010	Como	62	(0)
2012	Cremonese	0	(0)

International career
1991–1992	Italy U16	3	(0)
- * Club domestic league appearances and goals

Enrico Maria Malatesta (born 25 March 1976) is an Italian former professional footballer who played as a goalkeeper.

On 30 March 2012 he was signed by Cremonese.
