= Jacopo Napoli =

Italian composer

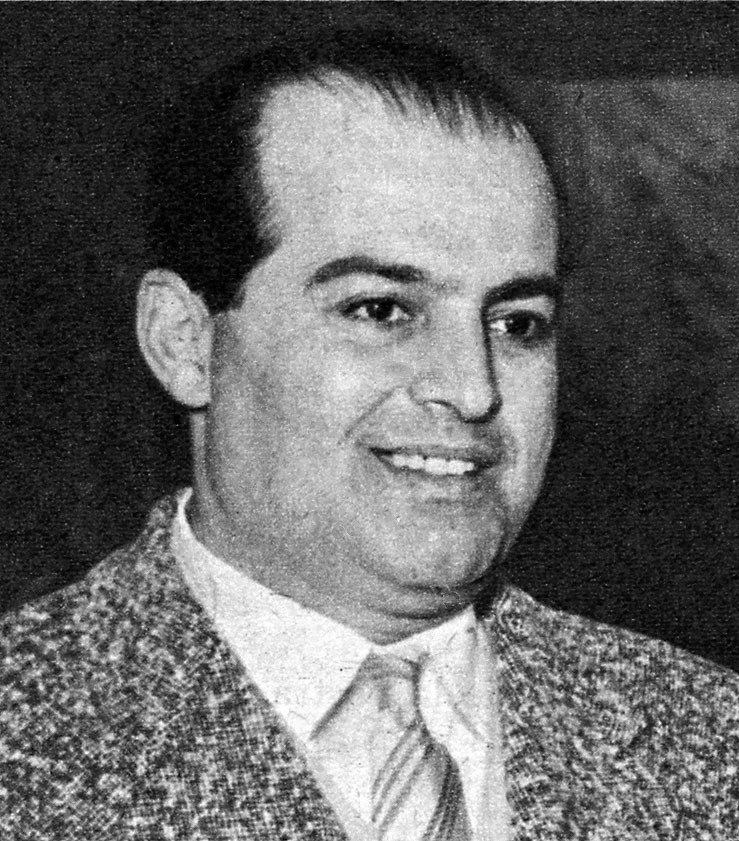
Jacopo Napoli (1961)

Jacopo Napoli (August 26, 1911 in Naples – 1994 in Ascea) was an Italian composer of the 20th century.

Born in Naples, he studied privately. He taught composition at the Cagliari music conservatory. He was the director of the Naples conservatory. His compositions include chamber music, songs, the operas Miseria e nobiltà, Il malato immaginario and Un curioso accidente, as well as the orchestral works Preludio di caccia and La festa di Anacapri.
