= Roberto Bortolotto =

Italian footballer

Personal information
- Date of birth: 15 April 1985 (age 41)
- Place of birth: Padua, Italy
- Height: 1.79 m (5 ft 10 in)
- Position: Forward

Youth career
- Padova
- 2000–2004: Milan

Senior career*
Years	Team	Apps	(Gls)
2003–2004	Milan	1	(0)
2004–2007	Biellese	58	(10)
2007–2013	Tritium	152	(42)
2013	Triestina	5	(0)
2013–2014	Tritium		
2014	Olginatese		
2014–2015	Albignasego		
2015–2016	US Torre 1970		
2016–2017	ACD La Rocca Monselice		
Total		216	(52)

International career
2003	Italy U18	2	(0)
2004	Italy U19	2	(0)
- * Club domestic league appearances and goals

Roberto Bortolotto (born 15 April 1985) is an Italian former professional footballer who played as a forward.

== Club career ==
Born in Padua, Veneto, Bortolotto started his career at Calcio Padova, then joined the A.C. Milan youth team. During the 2002–03 season, he played his first Serie A match for the senior side, the third last match of the season, before the 2003 UEFA Champions League Final and the 2003 Coppa Italia Final. Milan rested almost all of their regular starters during the match, and used 11 Primavera Team players on the field and on the bench. Bortolotto replaced Alessandro Matri in the 71st minute; the match ended in a 4–2 home loss to Piacenza.

In summer 2004, he joined Serie C2 side Biellese. The following season, he was signed by Chievo on a co-ownership deal. In June 2007, however, neither club wished to buy him outright, and Biellese was relegated. He then left for Serie D side Tritium, where he was re-united with his brother. Enrico Bortolotto. In June 2010, he won the Serie D Group B championship with the club, earning promotion to the Lega Pro Seconda Divisione.

== International career ==
Bortolotto was capped for the Italy U19 side during the team's 2004 UEFA European Under-19 Football Championship qualification campaign.
