= Gabriele Sabatini =

Italian football player and coach (1976–2026)

Personal information
- Date of birth: 22 March 1976
- Place of birth: La Spezia, Italy
- Date of death: 5 October 2026 (aged 50)
- Height: 1.80 m (5 ft 11 in)
- Position: Midfielder

Youth career
- AC Milan

Senior career*
Years	Team	Apps	(Gls)
1995–1996	Castelnuovo	28	(1)
1996–1997	Barberino	16	(2)
1997–1998	Pisa	29	(0)
1998–1999	Viterbese	2	(0)
1999–2000	Tempio	23	(0)
2000–2001	Cuneo	27	(2)
2001–2002	Bergamasca	24	(0)
2002–2003	Canavese	10	(3)
2003–2004	Valle d'Aosta		

International career
1991	Italy U16	3	(0)

Managerial career
- 2016–2017: Ligorna
- 2017–2021: Fezzanese
- * Club domestic league appearances and goals

Gabriele Sabatini (22 March 1976 – 5 October 2026) was an Italian professional football player and coach.

== Coaching career ==
On 5 June 2017, Sabatini was appointed head coach of Fezzanese playing in the fifth-tier Eccellenza. He led the club to promotion to Serie D in his first season with the club.

== Death ==
Sabatini died on 5 October 2026, at the age of 50.
