= Marco Amelia =

Italian footballer (born 1982)

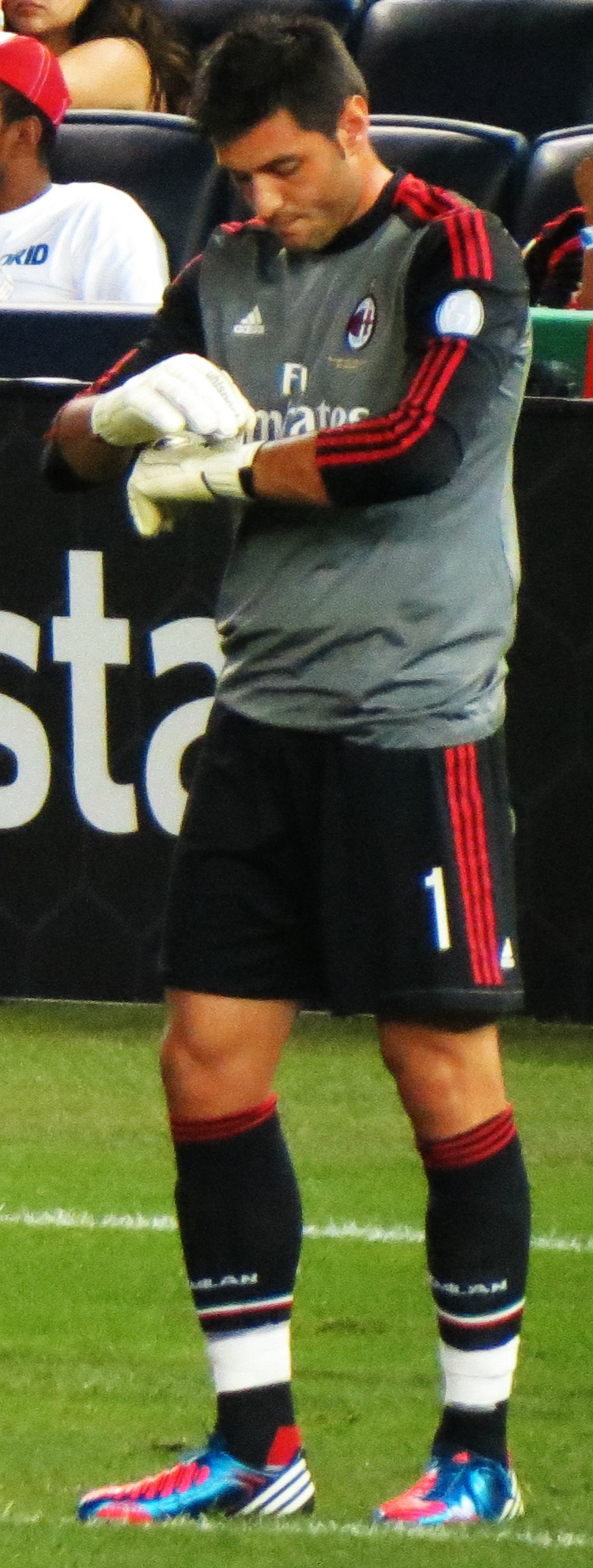
- Amelia with Milan in 2012

Personal information
- Full name: Marco Amelia
- Date of birth: 2 April 1982 (age 44)
- Place of birth: Frascati, Italy
- Height: 1.90 m (6 ft 3 in)
- Position: Goalkeeper

Team information
- Current team: Ħamrun Spartans (head coach)

Youth career
- 1987–1991: Lupa Frascati
- 1991–2001: Roma

Senior career*
| Years | Team | Apps | (Gls) |
| 2001–2008 | Livorno | 166 | (0) |
| 2003–2004 | → Lecce (loan) | 14 | (0) |
| 2004 | → Parma (loan) | 0 | (0) |
| 2008–2009 | Palermo | 34 | (0) |
| 2009–2010 | Genoa | 30 | (0) |
| 2010–2014 | Milan | 29 | (0) |
| 2014 | Rocca Priora | 1 | (0) |
| 2015 | Perugia | 1 | (0) |
| 2015 | Lupa Castelli Romani | 2 | (0) |
| 2015–2016 | Chelsea | 0 | (0) |
| 2017 | Vicenza | 4 | (0) |
| Total | | 281 | (0) |

International career
| 1998 | Italy U15 | 12 | (0) |
| 1998–1999 | Italy U16 | 5 | (0) |
| 2000–2001 | Italy U19 | 3 | (0) |
| 2002–2004 | Italy U21 | 19 | (0) |
| 2005–2009 | Italy | 9 | (0) |

Managerial career
- 2018–2019: Lupa Roma
- 2019–2020: Vastese
- 2021: Livorno
- 2021: Prato
- 2024: Olbia
- 2024–2025: Sondrio
- 2026–: Ħamrun Spartans
Medal record
Representing Italy
Men's Association football
FIFA World Cup
| Winner | 2006 Germany |
Summer Olympics
| Bronze medal – third place | 2004 |
- * Club domestic league appearances and goals

Marco Amelia Ufficiale OMRI (Italian pronunciation: [ˈmarko aˈmɛːlja]; born 2 April 1982) is an Italian former professional footballer who played as a goalkeeper, and his currently the head coach of Maltese Premier League club Ħamrun Spartans.

A Roma youth product, Amelia spent most of his professional club career at Livorno, where he made 181 appearances across all competitions, including playing and scoring in the 2006–07 UEFA Cup. He later played for several other Italian clubs, and also had a spell in England as a reserve goalkeeper with Chelsea.

At international level, Amelia won a bronze medal at the 2004 Olympics, and earned nine senior caps for Italy between 2005 and 2009. He was part of the squad that won the 2006 FIFA World Cup, also being included for Italy's UEFA Euro 2008 and 2009 FIFA Confederations Cup squads.

== Club career ==
=== Early career ===
Born in Frascati, Province of Rome, Amelia grew up as part of the Roma youth system, and initially played as a forward, before playing in goal. In 2001, he left the Giallorossi to join Serie C1 club Livorno on loan, playing only once in his first season with the Tuscan side; he was successively confirmed by Livorno in the 2002–03 season, for a transfer fee of €2.8 million, as part of the deal that acquired half of Giorgio Chiellini's registration rights for €3.1 million, and promoted as regular by head coach Roberto Donadoni in the club's Serie B comeback campaign.

Amelia then spent two unremarkable loan spells at Lecce and Parma (both Serie A) before returning to Livorno in June 2004, becoming one of the team mainstays since then, and also having his chance to make a debut at European level in the 2006–07 UEFA Cup, where he even managed to score a goal during the group stage, an injury time header in a 1–1 draw against Partizan in November 2006.

=== Palermo ===
In July 2008, after Livorno were relegated to Serie B, Amelia agreed a permanent deal and contract to join Palermo, for €6 million. Among the highlights of his season, fans mostly remembered Amelia for saving Ronaldinho's penalty in a 3–1 win over Milan, but also, in a more negative fashion, for failing to deal with Giuseppe Mascara's 49-yard strike in the Derby di Sicilia, which ended in a shocking 0–4 home loss for his side.

=== Genoa ===
In August 2009, Amelia moved to Genoa as part of a player exchange deal, with Rubinho moving the other way, both players valued €5 million. Amelia was the first choice of the team except a few matches played by backup Alessio Scarpi.

=== Milan ===
On 23 June 2010, and after the sale of goalkeeper Marco Storari to Juventus, Amelia was signed by Milan on loan in a deal which included the right to purchase the player at the end of the year-long loan.

On 24 May 2011, Milan exercised its option to purchase Amelia for €3.5 million on a three-year contract, despite Amelia only making a handful of appearances and being second-choice to Christian Abbiati all season. Amelia made his debut in the 2011–12 season in Serie A, on 28 November 2011 against Chievo, replacing Abbiati, who suffered a shoulder injury. Amelia went on to make 14 appearances for Milan that season.

In the 2012–13 season, his third season at Milan, Amelia continued to be second-choice to Abbiati, making 11 first-team appearances. Milan did not renew Amelia's contract at the end of 2013–14 season. Amelia and Daniele Bonera had a fight on 19 May in the return journey from the opening of Milan's new headquarters, Casa Milan. Amelia denied any fight, saying it was only an argument.

=== Later career ===
Amelia became a free agent on 1 July 2014. He spent a few months with amateur side Rocca Priora (where he served as a player and honorary president) before returning to professional football on 9 February 2015, for Serie B club Perugia. On 23 August 2015, Amelia became the honorary president and a player for Lega Pro newcomers Lupa Castelli Romani. He had played twice for Lupa Castelli Romani in 2015–16 Coppa Italia Lega Pro. On 31 August, he cancelled his contract with the club. On 8 October 2015, he moved abroad for the first time, signing for English Premier League club Chelsea on a free transfer, on a deal until the end of the season, with the team adding him as back-up goalkeeper to Asmir Begović due to an injury to Thibaut Courtois.

On 10 June 2016, it was announced Amelia would leave Chelsea on the expiry of his contract.

On 27 February 2017, Amelia signed a six-month contract with Serie B club Vicenza.

== International career ==
Amelia made his debut for the Italy under-15 side in March 1998, in a tournament held in France.

With the Italy under-21 side, Amelia was the starting goalkeeper in Claudio Gentile's squad that won the 2004 UEFA European Under-21 Championship. Later that year, he served as a back-up to Ivan Pelizzoli in the Italy under-23 squad which won a bronze medal at the 2004 Summer Olympics in Athens.

Amelia made his senior debut for Italy at age 23, on 16 November 2005, coming on as a second-half substitute in a 1–1 friendly draw against the Ivory Coast, in Geneva. He later became a permanent member of Marcello Lippi's squad, and was called up as Italy's third goalkeeper at the 2006 FIFA World Cup, behind Gianluigi Buffon and Angelo Peruzzi, and ahead of reserve Morgan De Sanctis. Italy went on to win the tournament, although Amelia did not feature in any matches throughout the competition.

Following Peruzzi's retirement, Amelia became Italy's second-choice goalkeeper, behind Buffon. He was called up as Buffon's back-up for UEFA Euro 2008 by manager Roberto Donadoni and for the 2009 FIFA Confederations Cup by Donadoni's replacement, Lippi. Amelia's last appearance for Italy came on 10 June 2009 in a 4–3 friendly win against New Zealand, in Pretoria. In total, Amelia has made nine appearances for Italy.

== Style of play ==
Amelia initially played as a forward in his youth before moving to the position of goalkeeper. He was mainly known for his excellent reflexes, shot-stopping ability, and his command of his area as a goalkeeper, despite his relatively modest stature for a goalkeeper (6ft 1in). He was considered to be one of the best Italian goalkeepers of his generation in his prime, but his opportunities at international level were limited by the presence of Buffon as the Italy national team's starting goalkeeper.

== Managerial career ==
After retirement, Amelia received his UEFA A coaching licence on 15 December 2017. In July 2018, he was appointed as the new head coach of Serie D club Lupa Roma.

On 29 June 2019, he moved to Serie D club Vastese. He was sacked on 28 January 2020 due to poor results.

On 1 March 2021, he agreed to return at Livorno as the club's new head coach, replacing Alessandro Dal Canto at the helm of the struggling Serie C side. He failed to save Livorno from relegation to Serie D and left by the end of the season; the club was successively dissolved due to longstanding financial issues.

On 29 September 2021, he was hired by Serie D club Prato. However, his period in charge of Prato lasted only two months, as he was dismissed on 27 December 2021.

In August 2024, Amelia was hired as the new head coach of recently-relegated Serie D club Olbia. After a negative start of the season with just one point achieved in the first four games of the season, however, Amelia was dismissed on 30 September 2024.

On 12 December 2024, Amelia was appointed as the new head coach of Serie D amateurs Nuova Sondrio.

On 1 August 2026, he was nominated as the new head coach of Maltese Premier League club Ħamrun Spartans signing a two years contract.

== Personal life ==
Amelia is married to an Italian woman, Carlotta Bosello. They have two children together: their son Giulio Cesare Amelia was born on 28 September 2009, and their daughter Matilde Amelia was born on 19 February 2013.

== Career statistics ==
=== Club ===
Appearances and goals by club, season and competition
| Club | Season | League | | | Cup | | Continental | | Other | | Total | |
| Club | Season | Division | Apps | Goals | Apps | Goals | Apps | Goals | Apps | Goals | Apps | Goals |
|---|---|---|---|---|---|---|---|---|---|---|---|---|
| Roma | 1999–2000 | Serie A | 0 | 0 | 0 | 0 | 0 | 0 | — | | 0 | 0 |
| Roma | 2000–01 | Serie A | 0 | 0 | 0 | 0 | 0 | 0 | — | | 0 | 0 |
| Roma | Total | | 0 | 0 | 0 | 0 | 0 | 0 | — | | 0 | 0 |
| Livorno | 2001–02 | Serie C1 | 1 | 0 | 0 | 0 | — | | — | | 1 | 0 |
| Livorno | 2002–03 | Serie B | 35 | 0 | 2 | 0 | — | | — | | 37 | 0 |
| Livorno | 2004–05 | Serie A | 31 | 0 | 2 | 0 | — | | — | | 33 | 0 |
| Livorno | 2005–06 | Serie A | 36 | 0 | 3 | 0 | — | | — | | 39 | 0 |
| Livorno | 2006–07 | Serie A | 30 | 0 | 0 | 0 | 8 (Note: Appearances in UEFA Europa League) | 1 | — | | 38 | 1 |
| Livorno | 2007–08 | Serie A | 33 | 0 | 0 | 0 | — | | — | | 33 | 0 |
| Livorno | Total | | 166 | 0 | 7 | 0 | 8 | 1 | — | | 181 | 1 |
| Lecce (loan) | 2003–04 | Serie A | 13 | 0 | 1 | 0 | — | | — | | 14 | 0 |
| Parma (loan) | 2003–04 | Serie A | 0 | 0 | 1 | 0 | 1 | 0 | — | | 2 | 0 |
| Palermo | 2008–09 | Serie A | 34 | 0 | 1 | 0 | — | | — | | 35 | 0 |
| Genoa | 2009–10 | Serie A | 30 | 0 | 0 | 0 | 5 | 0 | — | | 35 | 0 |
| Milan | 2010–11 | Serie A | 4 | 0 | 1 | 0 | 3 (Note: Appearances in UEFA Champions League) | 0 | — | | 8 | 0 |
| Milan | 2011–12 | Serie A | 9 | 0 | 4 | 0 | 1 | 0 | 0 | 0 | 14 | 0 |
| Milan | 2012–13 | Serie A | 11 | 0 | 1 | 0 | 1 | 0 | — | | 13 | 0 |
| Milan | 2013–14 | Serie A | 5 | 0 | 0 | 0 | 1 | 0 | — | | 6 | 0 |
| Milan | Total | | 29 | 0 | 6 | 0 | 6 | 0 | 0 | 0 | 41 | 0 |
| Career total | | | 272 | 0 | 16 | 0 | 20 | 1 | 0 | 0 | 308 | 1 |

=== International ===
Appearances and goals by national team and year
| National team | Year | Apps | Goals |
|---|---|---|---|
| Italy | 2005 | 1 | 0 |
| Italy | 2006 | 2 | 0 |
| Italy | 2007 | 2 | 0 |
| Italy | 2008 | 3 | 0 |
| Italy | 2009 | 1 | 0 |
| Total | | 9 | 0 |

=== Managerial ===
As of match played 2 May 2021

| Team | Nat | From | To | Record | | | | |
| Team | Nat | From | To | G | W | D | L | Win % |
|---|---|---|---|---|---|---|---|---|
| Lupa Roma | (Italy) | 20 July 2018 | 30 June 2019 | 39 | 7 | 10 | 22 | 17.95 |
| Vastese | (Italy) | 1 July 2019 | 28 January 2020 | 23 | 9 | 6 | 8 | 39.13 |
| Livorno | (Italy) | 1 March 2021 | 30 June 2021 | 11 | 2 | 4 | 5 | 18.18 |
| Prato | (Italy) | 29 September 2021 | 27 December 2021 | | | | | |
| Olbia | (Italy) | 1 July 2024 | 30 September 2024 | | | | | |
| Sondrio | (Italy) | 12 December 2024 | 30 June 2025 | | | | | |
| Ħamrun Spartans | (Malta) | 1 August 2026 | present | | | | | |
| Total | | | | 73 | 18 | 20 | 35 | 24.66 |

== Honours ==
Roma

- Serie A: 2000–01

Livorno

- Serie C1: 2001–02

Milan

- Serie A: 2010–11
- Supercoppa Italiana: 2011

Italy

- FIFA World Cup: 2006

Italy U21

- UEFA European Under-21 Championship: 2004

Italy Olympics

- Olympics Bronze medal: 2004

Orders

5th Class / Knight: Cavaliere Ordine al Merito della Repubblica Italiana: 2004

4th Class / Officer: Ufficiale Ordine al Merito della Repubblica Italiana: 2006

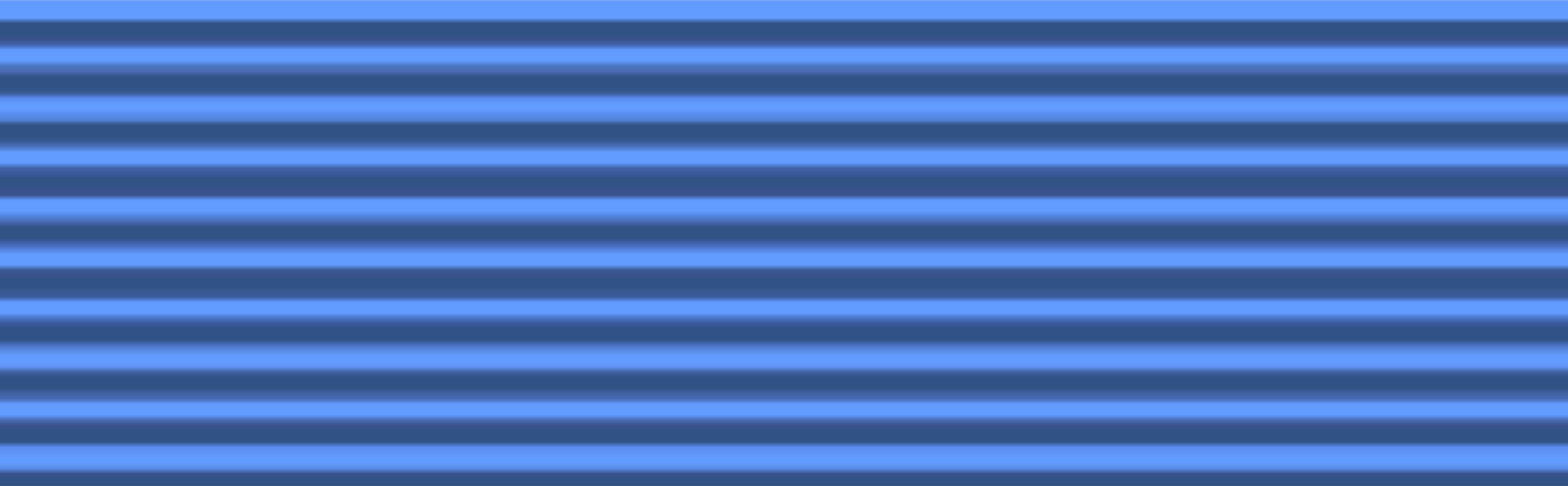

CONI: Golden Collar of Sports Merit: Collare d'Oro al Merito Sportivo: 2006
