= Matteo Teoldi =

Italian footballer

Personal information
- Date of birth: 12 May 1985 (age 41)
- Place of birth: Ponte San Pietro, Italy
- Height: 1.86 m (6 ft 1 in)
- Position: Defender

Team information
- Current team: CazzagoBornato

Youth career
- 2001–2004: Milan

Senior career*
Years	Team	Apps	(Gls)
2004	Arezzo	0	(0)
2005–2007	Lumezzane	79	(0)
2007–2008	Venezia	16	(0)
2008–2011	Cittadella	48	(0)
2011–2012	Mapello	26	(0)
2012–2013	Tritium	14	(0)
2013–2014	Mapello	17	(0)
2014–2015	Darfo Boario	28	(0)
2015	Pradalunghese		
2015	Mezzolara		
2016–2017	Caravaggio	16	(1)
2017–2018	Franciacorta		
2018–	CazzagoBornato		

International career
2001	Italy U-17	1	(0)
2003–2004	Italy U-19	11	(0)
2005	Italy U-20	1	(0)
- * Club domestic league appearances and goals as of end of 2018-19 season

Matteo Teoldi (born 12 May 1985 in Ponte San Pietro) is an Italian professional footballer who plays as a defender for Eccellenza club A.S.D. CazzagoBornato since 2018.

He represented Italy at the 2004 UEFA European Under-19 Football Championship.
