= Marcus Diniz =

Brazilian footballer (born 1987)

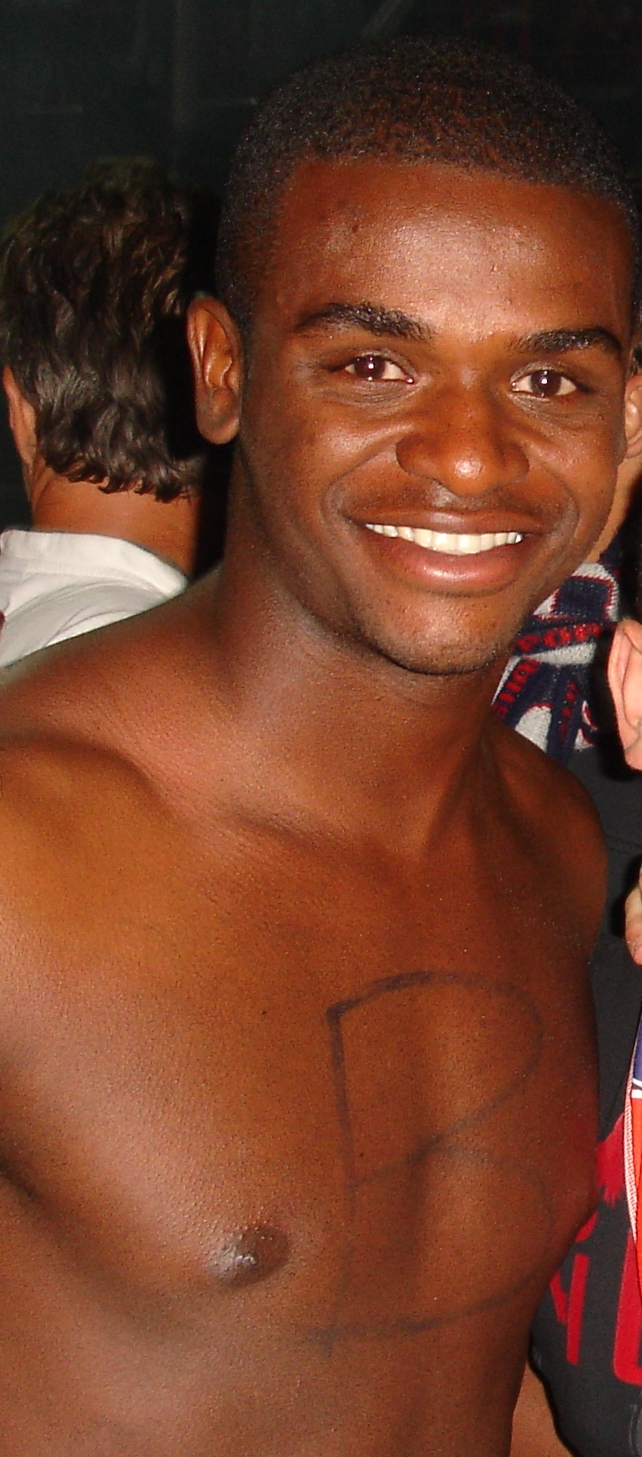
- Diniz in 2009

Personal information
- Full name: Marcus Plínio Diniz Paixão
- Date of birth: 1 August 1987 (age 39)
- Place of birth: Vitória, Brazil
- Height: 1.81 m (5 ft 11 in)
- Position: Centre-back

Team information
- Current team: Dunărea Călărași
- Number: 5

Youth career
- 1995–1999: Caxias-ES
- 2000–2002: Vasco da Gama
- 2003: Vitória
- 2004: Caxias-ES
- 2004–2007: AC Milan

Senior career*
Years	Team	Apps	(Gls)
2007–2008	AC Milan	0	(0)
2007–2008	→ Monza (loan)	13	(1)
2008–2009	Livorno	2	(0)
2009	→ Crotone (loan)	9	(0)
2009–2015	AC Milan	0	(0)
2009–2010	→ Livorno (loan)	21	(0)
2010	→ Parma (loan)	0	(0)
2010–2011	→ Eupen (loan)	5	(0)
2011–2012	→ Como (loan)	26	(1)
2012–2015	→ Lecce (loan)	45	(3)
2015–2016	Padova	31	(0)
2016–2017	FC Lausanne-Sport	29	(0)
2017–2020	Ironi Kiryat Shmona	77	(3)
2020–2022	Maccabi Petah Tikva	46	(0)
2022–2023	Hapoel Umm al-Fahm	34	(1)
2023–2024	Hapoel Umm al-Fahm	30	(0)
2024–	Dunărea Călărași	6	(0)
- * Club domestic league appearances and goals as of 17:03, 6 December 2024 (UTC)

Marcus Plínio Diniz Paixão (born 1 August 1987), commonly known as Marcus Diniz, is a Brazilian professional footballer who plays as a defender for Dunărea Călărași.

== Club career ==
Diniz started his career at Caxias Futebol Clube, of the Itararé quarter. He spent nine years there before transferring to the youth system of Vasco da Gama. He then moved to Vitória, eventually returning to Caxias in 2004.

=== AC Milan ===
He signed with AC Milan in late 2004 and has been a featured player in Milan's youth system. Milan decided to loan him to Serie C1 club Monza to get some first team experience.

=== Livorno ===
At the beginning of the 2008–09 season he was transferred at Serie B club Livorno, on a co-ownership deal, for €300,000. In January he was sent on loan to Crotone.

=== Return to AC Milan and loans ===
In June 2009, AC Milan re-acquired Diniz back from Livorno, in exchange for Romano Perticone, though letting them keep the Brazilian on loan. Both players' 50% registration rights was valued €2.5 million and the loan cost Livorno €150,000.

At the start of the 2010–11 season, Diniz joined Parma on a new loan spell, for €750,000, which however was interrupted after only one month and the player was sent on another loan to Belgian side Eupen.

For the 2011–12 season, he was loaned out again, this time to Lega Pro Prima Divisione club Como, where he made 26 league appearances and scored one goal.

The following season, he joined Lega Pro Prima Divisione side Lecce on a new loan deal, which was extended for a further season a year later. For the 2014–15 season, Diniz stayed at Lecce for a third consecutive season on loan.

=== Padova ===
For the 2015–16 season, he joined to Lega Pro club Padova, signing a two-year contract.
