= Mattia Rinaldini =

Italian footballer

Personal information
- Date of birth: 31 May 1980 (age 46)
- Place of birth: Faenza, Italy
- Height: 1.82 m (6 ft 0 in)
- Position: Midfielder

Senior career*
Years	Team	Apps	(Gls)
1998–1999	Milan	0	(0)
1999	Ascoli	14	(1)
2000	Padova	5	(0)
2000	Ravenna	1	(0)
2001	Arezzo	12	(0)
2001–2002	Varese	41	(3)
2003–2005	Prato	59	(10)
2005–2006	Benevento	18	(1)

International career
1998–1999	Italy U-18	7	(2)
2000	Italy U-20	1	(0)
- * Club domestic league appearances and goals

Mattia Rinaldini (born 31 May 1980 in Faenza) is a retired Italian professional football player.
