= Massimo De Martin =

Italian professional football player

Personal information
- Date of birth: January 3, 1983 (age 43)
- Place of birth: Belluno, Italy
- Height: 1.81 m (5 ft 11 in)
- Position: Striker

Youth career
- 2000: Milan

Senior career*
Years	Team	Apps	(Gls)
2002	Prato	4	(0)
2003	Alzano Virescit	12	(1)
2003–2006	Vicenza	41	(1)
2005	→ Sangiovannese (loan)	11	(0)
2006	Reggiana	0	(0)
2006–2008	Pavia	37	(5)

International career
2000	Italy U-16	3	(0)
2004	Italy U-20	1	(1)
- * Club domestic league appearances and goals

Massimo De Martin (born January 3, 1983, in Belluno) is an Italian professional football player who is currently unattached.

He played in the Serie B for Vicenza Calcio.
