= Alessandro Quattrini =

Italian footballer (born 1974)

Personal information
- Date of birth: 10 January 1974 (age 52)
- Position: Defender

Youth career
- 1992: Milan

Senior career*
| Years | Team | Apps | (Gls) |
| 1993–1994 | Gualdo | 14 | (0) |
| 1994–1995 | Crevalcore | 2 | (0) |
| 1996–1997 | Lodigiani | 6 | (0) |
| Total | | 22 | (0) |
- * Club domestic league appearances and goals

Alessandro Quattrini (born 10 January 1974) is an Italian former professional footballer who played as a defender. After playing for the youth team of Milan, Quattrini spent one year at Gualdo in 1993, before moving to Crevalcore the following year. In 1996 he moved to Lodigiani, where he retired from football.
