= Fabio Valsesia =

Italian footballer

Personal information
- Date of birth: 26 April 1981 (age 45)
- Place of birth: Borgomanero, Italy
- Height: 1.70 m (5 ft 7 in)
- Position: Striker

Youth career
- 1991–1998: Milan

Senior career*
Years	Team	Apps	(Gls)
1998–2000	Monza	1	(0)
2001	Pro Vercelli	19	(0)
2001–2002	Borgomanero	8	(0)
2002–2005	Castellettese		

International career
1997	Italy U-15	8	(2)
1997	Italy U-16	1	(0)
- * Club domestic league appearances and goals

Fabio Valsesia (born 26 April 1981 in Borgomanero) is an Italian former soccer player. He made 20 appearances in the Italian professional leagues, including playing in Serie B for Monza. He represented Italy at under-16 level.
