= Nicola Pasini =

Italian footballer (born 1991)

Personal information
- Date of birth: 10 April 1991 (age 35)
- Place of birth: Chiavenna, Italy
- Height: 1.85 m (6 ft 1 in)
- Position: Defender

Team information
- Current team: Union Brescia
- Number: 5

Youth career
- Milan

Senior career*
Years	Team	Apps	(Gls)
2011–2015	Genoa	0	(0)
2011–2012	→ Carrarese (loan)	18	(0)
2012–2013	→ Spezia (loan)	19	(0)
2013–2014	→ Venezia (loan)	27	(0)
2014–2015	→ Pistoiese (loan)	18	(1)
2015	→ Carpi (loan)	3	(0)
2015–2016	Pistoiese	30	(0)
2016–2018	Bassano Virtus	62	(2)
2018–2024	Vicenza	101	(3)
2024	Ancona	9	(0)
2024–2025	Feralpisalò	35	(0)
2025–	Union Brescia	18	(0)

International career
2007–2008	Italy U17	2	(0)
2011	Italy U20	1	(0)
- * Club domestic league appearances and goals as of 29 April 2026

Nicola Pasini (born 10 April 1991) is an Italian footballer who plays for Serie C Group A club Union Brescia.

== Biography ==
Born in Chiavenna, Lombardy, Pasini started his career at A.C. Milan. From 2008 to 2011, Pasini was a member of the reserve. On 20 July 2011, Pasini was exchanged with Matteo Chinellato in co-ownership in 3-year contract (50% Chinellato €1.75M and Pasini €1.65M) and which Milan registered a capital gain of €3.3 million. However, it was in terms of Chinellato's asset value of €3.5 million and vice versa (Genoa capital gains of €3.5M). Furthermore, both clubs had to amortize the contract value (transfer fee) as the cost of hiring the player in installments, as well as VAT. He signed a 3-year contract. On 27 July 2011, Pasini left for Carrarese in temporary deal. He made 17 starts and 1 substitute appearance, mainly as a centre-back. On 1 June 2012, Milan acquired Chinellato and Pelé outright; Genoa acquired Pasini and Mario Sampirisi outright in the same deal, all in pure player swap as Pelé's price was €50,000 less.

In July 2012, he joined Serie B club Spezia Calcio in another temporary deal. He was signed by Venezia on 2 August 2013. Circa 2013 he also signed a contract extension which last until 30 June 2015.

On 14 July 2014 he was signed by Pistoiese of the third division. On 30 January 2015 he was signed by Carpi.

In July 2016 he joined Serie C side Bassano in an undisclosed fee.

Pasino left Vicenza by mutual consent on 1 February 2024.

On 7 August 2024, Pasini signed a two-season contract with Feralpisalò.

=== International career ===
Pasini played for Italy U17 team in 2008 UEFA European Under-17 Football Championship qualification (2 starts). He was the member of the squad for 2008 Minsk youth tournament. However, no lineup was known. Pasini received a call-up to Italy national under-18 football team in October 2008. However, Pasini did not play any game for the U18 in 2008–09 season nor U19 in 2009–10 season. He received a call-up for a friendly match in October 2009. Pasini played once for the U20 team in 2010–11 Four Nations Tournament.

== Honours ==
- Coppa Italia Primavera: 2010 (Milan U20)
- Campionato Nazionale Allievi: 2007 (Milan U17)
