= Marcello Lambrughi =

Italian footballer

Personal information
- Date of birth: September 14, 1978 (age 48)
- Place of birth: Desio, Italy
- Height: 1.83 m (6 ft 0 in)
- Position: Defender

Youth career
- 1995–1996: Milan

Senior career*
Years	Team	Apps	(Gls)
1997–2000	Pro Sesto	64	(1)
2000	Treviso	0	(0)
2001	Giulianova	7	(0)
2001–2002	Pro Sesto	23	(0)
2002–2003	Sassuolo	19	(0)
2003–2006	Pizzighettone	48	(0)

International career
1995	Italy U-16	4	(0)
1996	Italy U-18	7	(0)
1996	Italy U-17	4	(0)
- * Club domestic league appearances and goals

Marcello Lambrughi (born September 14, 1978 in Desio) is a retired Italian professional football player.
