= Abdon Sgarbi =

Italian footballer (1903-1929)

Personal information
- Full name: Abdon Sgarbi
- Date of birth: 29 March 1903
- Place of birth: Bondeno, Kingdom of Italy
- Date of death: 18 August 1929 (aged 26)
- Place of death: Ferrara, Italy
- Position: Midfielder

Senior career*
Years	Team	Apps	(Gls)
1921–1927	SPAL	111	(19)
1927–1929	Milan	60	(5)
Total		171	(24)

International career
1929	Italy	1	(0)
- * Club domestic league appearances and goals

Abdon Sgarbi (Italian pronunciation: [ˈabdon ˈzɡarbi]; 29 March 1903 – 18 August 1929) was an Italian professional footballer who played as a midfielder. He died of pulmonary disease, aged only 26.
