= Alessandro Iacono =

Italian footballer (born 1973)

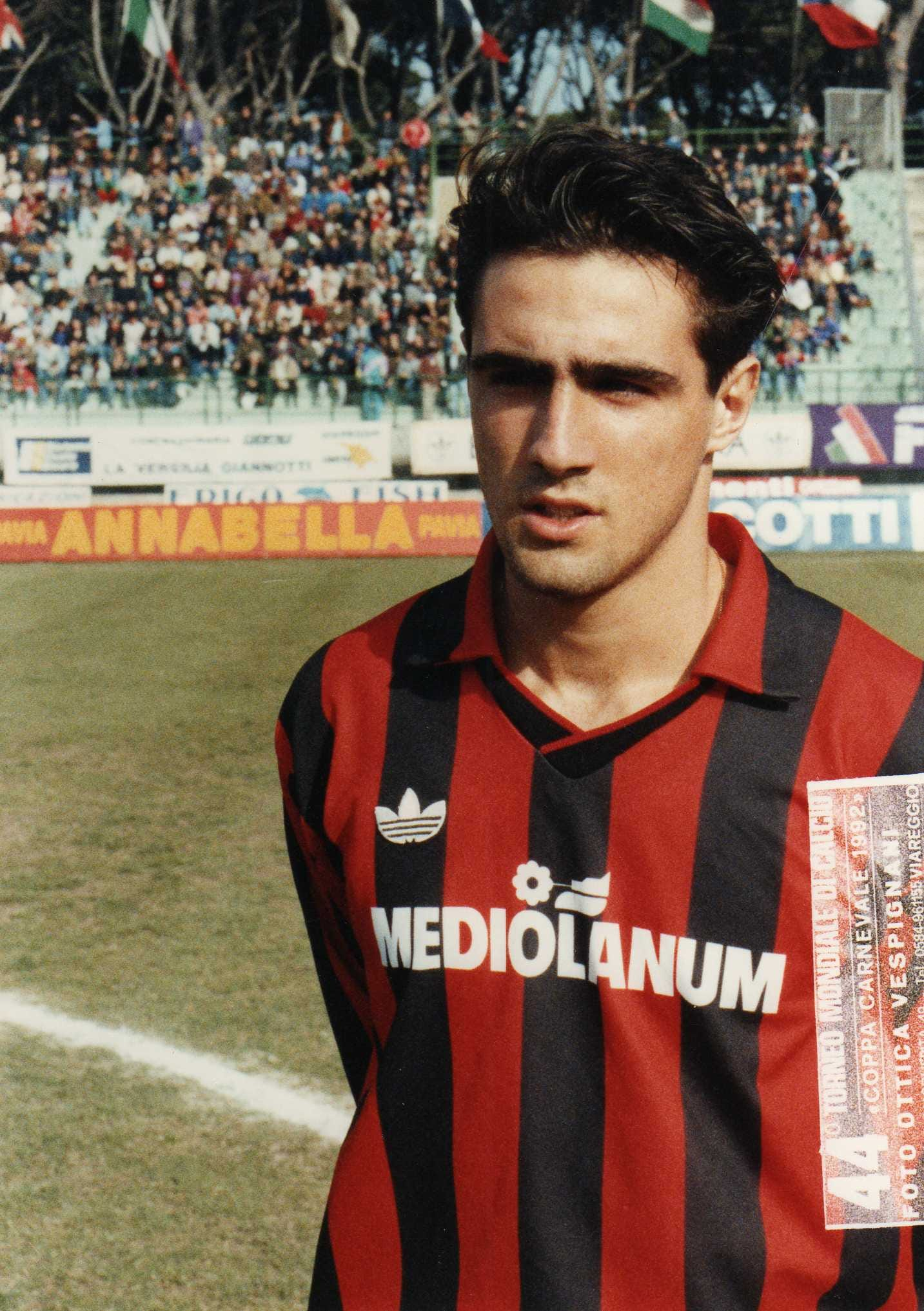

Personal information
- Date of birth: 29 October 1973 (age 52)
- Place of birth: Milan, Italy
- Position: Midfielder

Youth career
- Milan

Senior career*
Years	Team	Apps	(Gls)
1991-1992	Milan	0	(0)
1992–1993	Baracca Lugo	17	(3)
1993–1994	Legnano	20	(1)
1994–1995	Triestina	27	(3)
1995	Triestina	11	(0)
1995–1996	Pergocrema	18	(1)
1996–1998	Riccione	46	(16)
1998–1999	Santarcangelo	28	(5)
1999–2000	Riccione	19	(4)
2000	San Marino	9	(0)
2000–2001	Forlì	22	(2)
2001–2003	Russi	53	(12)
2003–2004	Massalombarda	20	(4)
2004–2006	Comacchio	67	(20)
2006	Alfonsine	10	(1)
2006–2007	Atletico Van Goof	18	(0)
2007–2008	Santagatese	21	(6)
2008–2009	Conselice	14	(4)

International career
1990–1991	Italy U18	12	(2)
- * Club domestic league appearances and goals

Alessandro Iacono (born 29 October 1973) is an Italian former professional footballer who made 61 appearances in the Italian professional leagues. In international football, he represented Italy at under-18 level.
