= Felice Cavaliere =

Italian professional football player

Personal information
- Date of birth: January 23, 1981 (age 45)
- Place of birth: Tivoli, Italy
- Height: 1.80 m (5 ft 11 in)
- Position: Defender

Youth career
- 1995–2000: Milan

Senior career*
Years	Team	Apps	(Gls)
2000–2001	Viterbese	12	(0)
2001–2002	Treviso	4	(0)
2002–2003	Frosinone	24	(0)
2003–2004	Tivoli	16	(0)
2004–2005	Pisoniano		
2005–2006	Terracina		
2006–2007	Ostia Mare	10	(1)
2007–2009	Gaeta	28	(1)

International career
1997	Italy U-15	8	(0)
2000	Italy U-18	4	(0)
- * Club domestic league appearances and goals

Felice Cavaliere (born January 23, 1981, in Tivoli) is an Italian professional football player who is currently unattached.
