= FCD Conegliano Calcio 1907 =

Italian football club

Conegliano
- Full name: Football Club Dilettante Conegliano Calcio 1907
- Founded: 1907
- Ground: Stadio Narciso Soldan, Conegliano, Italy
- Capacity: 1,500
- Chairman: (Italy) Alberto Basciano
- Manager: (Italy)
- League: Serie D
Home colours	Away colours	Third colours

F.C.D. Conegliano 1907 (or simply Conegliano) is an Italian football club based in Conegliano near Treviso in Veneto. Currently it plays in Italy's fourth-tier Serie D.

The team has played three seasons in Serie C.

== Colors and badge ==
The team's colors are yellow and blue.

== Stadium ==
Currently the team plays at the Narciso Soldan Stadium.

== Notable players ==
- (Nigeria) Stephen Makinwa (2000–2001)
- (Germany) Marcelo Aparicio Mateos (2003–2004)
- (Albania) Azdren Llullaku (2004–2006)
