= 2004–05 AC Milan season =

AC Milan
2004–05 season
- President: Silvio Berlusconi
- Manager: Carlo Ancelotti
- Stadium: San Siro
- Serie A: 2nd
- Coppa Italia: Quarter-finals
- Supercoppa Italiana: Winners
- UEFA Champions League: Runners-up
- Top goalscorer: League: Andriy Shevchenko (17); All: Andriy Shevchenko (26)
- Highest home attendance: 79,775 vs Internazionale, Serie A, 24 October 2004
- Lowest home attendance: 2,170 vs Udinese, Coppa Italia, 26 January 2005
- Average home league attendance: 63,595
Home colours	Away colours	Third colours

Associazione Calcio Milan began the 2004–05 season auspiciously by winning the 2004 Supercoppa Italiana, with a comfortable 3–0 victory over Lazio (the winners of the previous season's Coppa Italia), thanks to a hat-trick by Andriy Shevchenko.

The Serie A began with a 2–2 draw against Livorno. For most of the season, Milan were second to Juventus, in a close points race. However, after matchweeks 25 through 30, and again matchweeks 33 through 34, Milan were in first place. On 8 May 2005, Milan faced Juventus at home; by matchweek 35, the two had almost identical statistics of 76 points, 23 wins, 7 draws, and 4 defeats, with Milan's marginally superior goal difference of +36 against Juventus' +35 keeping them on top. Having lost the potential title deciding game 1–0 to a goal by David Trezeguet, Milan drew three more times afterwards and finished in the second place.

In the Champions League, Milan were successful and sure-footed, comfortably topping their group (which included Barcelona, Celtic and Shakhtar Donetsk) and then knocking out Manchester United, cross-city rivals Inter and PSV Eindhoven, thus reaching their second Champions League final in three years. The final was against Liverpool. In the first half Ancelotti's men scored three goals, one from Paolo Maldini, the club captain, and two from Hernán Crespo. However, in the second half, the English opponents managed to do the same in just 6 minutes, meaning the match went to extra time. Milan were not able to find a fourth goal and had to face a penalty shoot-out. Unlike in 2003, Milan players went first and missed the first and second penalty kicks (taken by Serginho and Pirlo). Shevchenko, who scored the deciding penalty two years earlier, had to score from the fifth penalty to keep Milan in the game, but failed to beat Dudek, and Liverpool won the Champions League, in one of the most famous come-backs in European football history.

Throughout the season, Ancelotti mostly used the 4–4–2 diamond (or 4–1–2–1–2) formation, which he had previously employed with much success, especially in 2002–03; the fact that four top-quality strikers were available (Shevchenko, Crespo, Inzaghi and Tomasson) made it almost imperative that two of them would have to be used as regular starters. On rare occasions, however, formations with three centrebacks and two wingbacks (usually Cafu and Serginho), such as 3–5–2 or 3–4–1–2, were used.

== Players ==
=== Squad information ===
Squad at end of season

Squad no.	Name	Nationality	Position
Goalkeepers
1	Dida	(Brazil)	GK
17	Christian Abbiati	(Italy)	GK
12	Valerio Fiori	(Italy)	GK
Defenders
3	Paolo Maldini (Captain)	(Italy)	CB / LB
2	Cafu	(Brazil)	RB
13	Alessandro Nesta	(Italy)	CB
31	Jaap Stam	(Netherlands)	CB / RB
4	Kakha Kaladze	(Georgia (country))	LB / CB
5	Alessandro Costacurta (Vice Captain)	(Italy)	CB
14	Dario Šimić	(Croatia)	CB / RB
27	Serginho	(Brazil)	LB
26	Giuseppe Pancaro	(Italy)	LB / RB
30	Harvey Esajas	(Netherlands)	LB
Midfielders
21	Andrea Pirlo	(Italy)	CM
8	Gennaro Gattuso	(Italy)	CM
10	Rui Costa	(Portugal)	AM
22	Kaká	(Brazil)	AM
20	Clarence Seedorf	(Netherlands)	CM / AM
23	Massimo Ambrosini	(Italy)	CM
24	Vikash Dhorasoo	(France)	CM
32	Cristian Brocchi	(Italy)	CM
Forwards
7	Andriy Shevchenko	(Ukraine)	CF
11	Hernán Crespo (on loan from Chelsea)	(Argentina)	CF
9	Filippo Inzaghi	(Italy)	CF
15	Jon Dahl Tomasson	(Denmark)	CF

=== Left club during season ===
Note: Flags indicate national team as defined under FIFA eligibility rules; some limited exceptions apply. Players may hold more than one non-FIFA nationality.

No.	Pos.	Nation	Player
18	FW	ITA	Nicola Pozzi (to Napoli)
19	DF	ARG	Fabricio Coloccini (to Deportivo La Coruña)

No.	Pos.	Nation	Player
45	DF	ITA	Ignazio Abate (on loan to Napoli)

=== Reserve squad ===
Note: Flags indicate national team as defined under FIFA eligibility rules; some limited exceptions apply. Players may hold more than one non-FIFA nationality.

No.	Pos.	Nation	Player
40	GK	ITA	Giuseppe Dei Forti
41	FW	ITA	Davide Barbieri
42	FW	ITA	Carlo Ferrario
43	DF	ITA	Elia Legati

No.	Pos.	Nation	Player
45	DF	ITA	Ignazio Abate
46	DF	ITA	Lino Marzoratti
47	DF	ITA	Romano Perticone
50	FW	ITA	Matteo Ardemagni

== Transfers ==
=== In ===
==== First-team ====
No.	Pos.	Nat.	Name	Age	EU	Moving from	Type	Transfer window	Ends	Transfer fee	Source
31	DF	(Netherlands)	Jaap Stam	31	EU	(Italy) Lazio	Transfer	Summer	2006	Undisclosed	BBC Sport
24	MF	(France)	Vikash Dhorasoo	30	EU	(France) Lyon	Free transfer	Summer	2006	Free	UEFA
30	DF	(Netherlands)	Harvey Esajas	29	EU		Free transfer	Summer		Free	
11	FW	(Argentina)	Hernán Crespo	28		(England) Chelsea	Loan	Summer	2005	Season-long loan	UEFA

Total spending: ▼€

=== Out ===
==== First-team ====
No.	Pos.	Nat.	Name	Age	EU	Moving to	Type	Transfer window	Transfer fee	Source
5	MF	(Argentina)	Fernando Redondo	35		Retired	End of contract	Summer	Free	
11	MF	(Brazil)	Rivaldo	32		(Greece) Olympiacos	Transfer	Summer		The Independent
18	FW	(Italy)	Marco Borriello	22	EU	(Italy) Reggina	Loan	Summer	Season-long loan	Sky Sports
24	DF	(Denmark)	Martin Laursen	26		(England) Aston Villa	Transfer	Summer	€3,000,000	Aston Villa
25	DF	(Brazil)	Roque Júnior	27		(Germany) Bayer Leverkusen	Free transfer	Summer	Free	ESPN
19	DF	(Argentina)	Fabricio Coloccini	23		(Spain) Deportivo	Transfer	Winter	Undisclosed	World Soccer

==== Reserves ====
No.	Pos.	Nat.	Name	Age	EU	Moving to	Type	Transfer window	Transfer fee	Source
18	FW	(Italy)	Nicola Pozzi	18	EU	(Italy) Napoli	Loan	Summer	Loan	
42	FW	(Italy)	Roberto Bortolotto	19	EU	(Italy) Biellese	Transfer	Summer		
43	FW	(Italy)	Alessandro Matri	19	EU	(Italy) Prato	Loan	Summer	Season-long loan	
45	DF	(Italy)	Ignazio Abate	17	EU	(Italy) Napoli	Loan	Summer	Season-long loan	
48	MF	(Italy)	Patrick Kalambay	20	EU	(Italy) Fermana	Loan	Summer	Season-long loan	
51	MF	(Brazil)	Claiton	19		(Italy) Prato	Loan	Summer	Six-month loan	
52	FW	(Italy)	Michele Piccolo	18	EU	(Italy) Prato	Loan	Summer	Six-month loan	
41	MF	(Italy)	Mattia Dal Bello	20	EU		Deceased	Winter		

▲ Total income: € Net income: ▲€

== Competitions ==
Win Draw Loss

=== Supercoppa ===
21 August 2004	Milan	3–0	Lazio	Milan
20:45 CEST (UTC+02:00)	Shevchenko 36', 46', 76'	Report		Stadium: San Siro; Attendance: 33,274; Referee: Pierluigi Collina

=== Serie A ===
==== League table ====
Pos	Team	Pld	W	D	L	GF	GA	GD	Pts	Qualification or relegation
1	Juventus (Note: Juventus were stripped of the title during the 2005–06 Serie A season, because of the 2006 Italian football scandal)	38	26	8	4	67	27	+40	86	Qualification to Champions League group stage
2	Milan	38	23	10	5	63	28	+35	79	Qualification to Champions League group stage
3	Internazionale	38	18	18	2	65	37	+28	72	Qualification to Champions League third qualifying round
4	Udinese	38	17	11	10	56	40	+16	62	Qualification to Champions League third qualifying round
5	Sampdoria	38	17	10	11	42	29	+13	61	Qualification to UEFA Cup first round

Source: 2004–05 Serie A, RSSSF.com, Soccerway
Rules for classification: 1) Points; 2) Head-to-head points; 3) Head-to-head goal difference; 4) Goal difference; 5) Goals scored; 6) Draw. (Note: Head-to-head record is used only after all the matches between the teams in question have been played).

==== Results summary ====
Overall								Home						Away					
Pld	W	D	L	GF	GA	GD	Pts	W	D	L	GF	GA	GD	W	D	L	GF	GA	GD
38	23	10	5	63	28	+35	79	11	5	3	38	17	+21	12	5	2	25	11	+14

Source: Competitive matches

==== Results by round ====
Round	1	2	3	4	5	6	7	8	9	10	11	12	13	14	15	16	17	18	19	20	21	22	23	24	25	26	27	28	29	30	31	32	33	34	35	36	37	38
Ground	A	H	A	H	A	H	A	H	H	A	H	A	A	H	A	H	A	H	A	H	A	H	A	H	A	H	A	A	H	A	H	H	A	H	A	H	A	H
Result	D	W	L	W	W	W	D	W	W	D	D	W	W	W	W	D	W	D	W	L	L	W	W	W	W	W	W	W	W	D	L	W	W	W	L	D	D	D
Position	11	4	11	4	3	2	3	2	2	2	2	2	2	2	2	2	2	2	2	2	2	2	2	2	1	1	1	1	1	1	2	2	1	1	2	2	2	2

Source: Competitive matches
A = Away; H = Home; W = Win; D = Draw; L = Loss; = Leader, UEFA Champions League Groups stage; = UEFA Champions League Groups stage; = UEFA Champions League Qualifying round; = 2005–06 UEFA Cup; = 2005–06 Serie B

==== Matches ====
11 September 2004 1	Milan	2–2	Livorno	Milan
20:30 CEST (UTC+02:00)	Seedorf 3', 47'	Report	Lucarelli 9' (pen.), 67'	Stadium: San Siro; Attendance: 69,453; Referee: Tiziano Pieri

19 September 2004 2	Bologna	0–2	Milan	Bologna
15:00 CEST (UTC+02:00)		Report	Shevchenko 84' (pen.); Kaká 90+1'	Stadium: Stadio Renato Dall'Ara; Attendance: 27,345; Referee: Domenico Messina

22 September 2004 3	Milan	1–2	Messina	Milan
20:30 CEST (UTC+02:00)	Pancaro 54'	Report	Giampà 55'; Zampagna 59'	Stadium: San Siro; Attendance: 59,640; Referee: Roberto Rosetti

26 September 2004 4	Lazio	1–2	Milan	Rome
20:30 CEST (UTC+02:00)	Couto 37'	Report	Shevchenko 70', 74'	Stadium: Stadio Olimpico; Attendance: 41,738; Referee: Gianluca Paparesta

3 October 2004 5	Milan	3–1	Reggina	Milan
15:00 CEST (UTC+02:00)	Shevchenko 11', 89'; Kaká 67'	Report	Franceschini 59'	Stadium: San Siro; Attendance: 59,473; Referee: Matteo Trefoloni

17 October 2004 6	Cagliari	0–1	Milan	Cagliari
15:00 CEST (UTC+02:00)		Report	Pirlo 20'	Stadium: Stadio Sant'Elia; Attendance: 20,000; Referee: Pasquale Rodomonti

24 October 2004 7	Milan	0–0	Internazionale	Milan
20:30 CEST (UTC+02:00)		Report		Stadium: San Siro; Attendance: 79,775; Referee: Roberto Rosetti

27 October 2004 8	Milan	3–0	Atalanta	Milan
20:30 CEST (UTC+02:00)	Tomasson 53'; Kaladze 71'; Serginho 90+2'	Report		Stadium: San Siro; Attendance: 57,621; Referee: Paolo Bertini

30 October 2004 9	Sampdoria	0–1	Milan	Genoa
18:00 CEST (UTC+02:00)		Report	Shevchenko 76'	Stadium: Stadio Luigi Ferraris; Attendance: 28,226; Referee: Stefano Farina

7 November 2004 10	Milan	1–1	Roma	Milan
20:30 CET (UTC+01:00)	Shevchenko 6'	Report	Montella 48'	Stadium: San Siro; Attendance: 63,951; Referee: Paolo Bertini

10 November 2004 11	Brescia	0–0	Milan	Brescia
20:30 CET (UTC+01:00)		Report		Stadium: Stadio Mario Rigamonti; Attendance: 8,093; Referee: Salvatore Racalbuto

14 November 2004 12	Milan	2–1	Siena	Milan
15:00 CET (UTC+01:00)	Shevchenko 26', 38'	Report	Argilli 32'	Stadium: San Siro; Attendance: 58,090; Referee: Paolo Bertini

28 November 2004 13	Chievo	0–1	Milan	Verona
15:00 CET (UTC+01:00)		Report	Crespo 49'	Stadium: Stadio Marc'Antonio Bentegodi; Attendance: 23,406; Referee: Pierluigi Collina

4 December 2004 14	Parma	1–2	Milan	Parma
18:00 CET (UTC+01:00)	Gilardino 68'	Report	Kaká 82'; Pirlo 90'	Stadium: Stadio Ennio Tardini; Attendance: 21,259; Referee: Tiziano Pieri

12 December 2004 15	Milan	6–0	Fiorentina	Milan
15:00 CET (UTC+01:00)	Seedorf 16', 82'; Chiellini 22' (o.g.); Shevchenko 52', 73'; Crespo 61'	Report		Stadium: San Siro; Attendance: 69,226; Referee: Pasquale Rodomonti

18 December 2004 16	Juventus	0–0	Milan	Turin
20:30 CET (UTC+01:00)		Report		Stadium: Stadio delle Alpi; Attendance: 54,181; Referee: Paolo Bertini

6 January 2005 17	Milan	5–2	Lecce	Milan
15:00 CET (UTC+01:00)	Crespo 23', 56', 57'; Shevchenko 50'; Tomasson 89'	Report	Bojinov 75'; Cassetti 83'	Stadium: San Siro; Attendance: 70,806; Referee: Matteo Trefoloni

9 January 2005 18	Palermo	0–0	Milan	Palermo
20:30 CET (UTC+01:00)		Report		Stadium: Stadio Renzo Barbera; Attendance: 34,047; Referee: Pasquale Rodomonti

16 January 2005 19	Milan	3–1	Udinese	Milan
15:00 CET (UTC+01:00)	Shevchenko 31'; Jankulovski 53' (o.g.); Kaká 90'	Report	Di Natale 9'	Stadium: San Siro; Attendance: 62,507; Referee: Matteo Trefoloni

23 January 2005 20	Livorno	1–0	Milan	Livorno
15:00 CET (UTC+01:00)	Colombo 28'	Report		Stadium: Stadio Armando Picchi; Attendance: 19,472; Referee: Stefano Farina

30 January 2005 21	Milan	0–1	Bologna	Milan
15:00 CET (UTC+01:00)		Report	Locatelli 27'	Stadium: San Siro; Attendance: 56,756; Referee: Massimo De Santis

2 February 2005 22	Messina	1–4	Milan	Messina
20:30 CET (UTC+01:00)	Zampagna 33'	Report	Crespo 9', 64'; Tomasson 18', 90+1'	Stadium: Stadio San Filippo; Attendance: 37,582; Referee: Paolo Bertini

6 February 2005 23	Milan	2–1	Lazio	Milan
20:30 CET (UTC+01:00)	Shevchenko 72'; Crespo 90+4'	Report	Oddo 56' (pen.)	Stadium: San Siro; Attendance: 56,845; Referee: Roberto Rosetti

13 February 2005 24	Reggina	0–1	Milan	Reggio Calabria
20:30 CET (UTC+01:00)		Report	Zamboni 39' (o.g.)	Stadium: Stadio Oreste Granillo; Attendance: 19,944; Referee: Salvatore Racalbuto

19 February 2005 25	Milan	1–0	Cagliari	Milan
20:30 CET (UTC+01:00)	Serginho 90+2'	Report		Stadium: San Siro; Attendance: 59,185; Referee: Daniele Tombolini

27 February 2005 26	Internazionale	0–1	Milan	Milan
20:30 CET (UTC+01:00)		Report	Kaká 74'	Stadium: San Siro; Attendance: 78,347; Referee: Massimo De Santis

5 March 2005 27	Atalanta	1–2	Milan	Bergamo
18:00 CET (UTC+01:00)	Makinwa 73'	Report	Ambrosini 72'; Pirlo 90+4'	Stadium: Stadio Atleti Azzurri d'Italia; Attendance: 21,095; Referee: Paolo Bertini

13 March 2005 28	Milan	1–0	Sampdoria	Milan
15:00 CET (UTC+01:00)	Kaká 65'	Report		Stadium: San Siro; Attendance: 69,441; Referee: Roberto Rosetti

20 March 2005 29	Roma	0–2	Milan	Rome
20:30 CET (UTC+01:00)		Report	Crespo 63'; Pirlo 71' (pen.)	Stadium: Stadio Olimpico; Attendance: 59,496; Referee: Gianluca Paparesta

9 April 2005 30	Milan	1–1	Brescia	Milan
18:00 CEST (UTC+02:00)	Rui Costa 14'	Report	Womé 87'	Stadium: San Siro; Attendance: 59,726; Referee: Pasquale Rodomonti

17 April 2005 31	Siena	2–1	Milan	Siena
15:00 CEST (UTC+02:00)	Chiesa 72'; Cozza 86'	Report	Crespo 63'	Stadium: Stadio Artemio Franchi – Montepaschi Arena; Attendance: 13,730; Referee: Pierluigi Collina

20 April 2005 32	Milan	1–0	Chievo	Milan
20:30 CEST (UTC+02:00)	Seedorf 65'	Report		Stadium: San Siro; Attendance: 54,894; Referee: Gianluca Paparesta

23 April 2005 33	Milan	3–0	Parma	Milan
20:30 CEST (UTC+02:00)	Kaká 34'; Tomasson 62'; Cafu 71'	Report		Stadium: San Siro; Attendance: 60,818; Referee: Roberto Rosetti

30 April 2005 34	Fiorentina	1–2	Milan	Florence
20:30 CEST (UTC+02:00)	Maresca 25'	Report	Shevchenko 46', 55'	Stadium: Stadio Artemio Franchi; Attendance: 45,909; Referee: Massimo De Santis

8 May 2005 35	Milan	0–1	Juventus	Milan
15:00 CEST (UTC+02:00)		Report	Trezeguet 28'	Stadium: San Siro; Attendance: 79,232; Referee: Pierluigi Collina

15 May 2005 36	Lecce	2–2	Milan	Lecce
15:00 CEST (UTC+02:00)	Konan 46'; Vučinić 83'	Report	Kaladze 12'; Shevchenko 53'	Stadium: Stadio Via del Mare; Attendance: 21,628; Referee: Matteo Trefoloni

20 May 2005 37	Milan	3–3	Palermo	Milan
15:00 CEST (UTC+02:00)	Serginho 8', 16'; Tomasson 32'	Report	Costacurta 9' (o.g.); Toni 77' (pen.); Barone 79'	Stadium: San Siro; Attendance: 60,872; Referee: Daniele Tombolini

29 May 2005 38	Udinese	1–1	Milan	Udine
15:00 CEST (UTC+02:00)	Di Michele 56'	Report	Serginho 85'	Stadium: Stadio Friuli; Attendance: 21,397; Referee: Matteo Trefoloni

=== Coppa Italia ===
==== Round of 16 ====
20 November 2004 First leg	Palermo	1–2	Milan	Palermo
21:00 CET (UTC+01:00)	Toni 79'	Report	Crespo 53'; Seedorf 69'	Stadium: Stadio Renzo Barbera; Attendance: 35,000; Referee: Danilo Nucini

12 January 2005 Second leg	Milan	2–0 (4–1 agg.)	Palermo	Milan
21:00 CET (UTC+01:00)	Brocchi 19'; Tomasson 77' (pen.)	Report		Stadium: San Siro; Attendance: 4,349; Referee: Luca Palanca

==== Quarter-finals ====
26 January 2005 First leg	Milan	3–2	Udinese	Milan
21:00 CET (UTC+01:00)	Ambrosini 17', 68'; Serginho 84'	Report	Di Michele 21', 37'	Stadium: San Siro; Attendance: 2,170; Referee: Marco Gabriele

16 March 2005 Second leg	Udinese	4–1 (6–4 agg.)	Milan	Udine
21:00 CET (UTC+01:00)	Iaquinta 21'; Mauri 62', 90+5'; Di Michele 82' (pen.)	Report	Tomasson 78'	Stadium: Stadio Friuli; Attendance: 13,648; Referee: Emidio Morganti

=== UEFA Champions League ===
==== Group stage ====
Pos	Team	Pld	W	D	L	GF	GA	GD	Pts	Qualification
1	(Italy) Milan	6	4	1	1	10	3	+7	13	Advance to knockout stage
2	(Spain) Barcelona	6	3	1	2	9	6	+3	10	Advance to knockout stage
3	(Ukraine) Shakhtar Donetsk	6	2	0	4	5	9	−4	6	Transfer to UEFA Cup
4	(Scotland) Celtic	6	1	2	3	4	10	−6	5	

14 September 2004 1	Shakhtar Donetsk (Ukraine)	0–1	(Italy) Milan	Donetsk, Ukraine
20:45 CEST (UTC+02:00)	Srna (yellow card) 18' (yellow-red card) 53'	Report	Tomasson (yellow card) 38'; Cafu (yellow card) 58'; Dhorasoo (yellow card) 77'; Seedorf 84'	Stadium: RSC Olimpiyskiy; Attendance: 30,000; Referee: Herbert Fandel (Germany)

29 September 2004 2	Milan (Italy)	3–1	(Scotland) Celtic	Milan, Italy
20:45 CEST (UTC+02:00)	Shevchenko 8'; Inzaghi 89'; Pirlo 90+1'	Report	Sutton (yellow card) 62'; Varga 74'	Stadium: San Siro; Attendance: 50,000; Referee: Gilles Veissière (France)

20 October 2004 3	Milan (Italy)	1–0	(Spain) Barcelona	Milan, Italy
20:45 CEST (UTC+02:00)	Shevchenko 31'	Report	Puyol (yellow card) 73'	Stadium: San Siro; Attendance: 76,502; Referee: Graham Poll (England)

2 November 2004 4	Barcelona (Spain)	2–1	(Italy) Milan	Barcelona, Spain
20:45 CET (UTC+01:00)	Eto'o 37'; Ronaldinho 89', (yellow card) 90'	Report	Shevchenko 17'; Kaká (yellow card) 49'; Ambrosini (yellow card) 65'; Gattuso (yellow card) 90+2'	Stadium: Camp Nou; Attendance: 94,682; Referee: Urs Meier (Switzerland)

24 November 2004 5	Milan (Italy)	4–0	(Ukraine) Shakhtar Donetsk	Milan, Italy
20:45 CET (UTC+01:00)	Nesta (yellow card) 3'; Kaká 52', 90+2'; Crespo 53', 85'; Gattuso (yellow card) 69'	Report	Srna (yellow card) 4'	Stadium: San Siro; Attendance: 38,841; Referee: Frank De Bleeckere (Belgium)

7 December 2004 6	Celtic (Scotland)	0–0	(Italy) Milan	Glasgow, Scotland
20:45 CET (UTC+01:00)	Lennon (yellow card) 37'; Camara (yellow card) 71'	Report	Brocchi (yellow card) 75'	Stadium: Celtic Park; Attendance: 59,228; Referee: Kyros Vassaras (Greece)

==== Knockout phase ====
===== Round of 16 =====
23 February 2005 First leg	Manchester United (England)	0–1	(Italy) Milan	Manchester, England
20:45 CET (UTC+01:00)	Fortune (yellow card) 45'	Report	Nesta (yellow card) 30'; Crespo 78'	Stadium: Old Trafford; Attendance: 67,150; Referee: Manuel Mejuto González (Spain)

8 March 2005 Second leg	Milan (Italy)	1–0 (2–0 agg.)	(England) Manchester United	Milan, Italy
20:45 CET (UTC+01:00)	Crespo 61'	Report	Fortune (yellow card) 58'	Stadium: San Siro; Attendance: 79,100; Referee: Herbert Fandel (Germany)

===== Quarter-finals =====
6 April 2005 First leg	Milan (Italy)	2–0	(Italy) Internazionale	Milan, Italy
20:45 CEST (UTC+02:00)	Gattuso (yellow card) 34'; Stam 45+1', (yellow card) 65'; Shevchenko 74', (yellow card) 75'	Report	Mihajlović (yellow card) 66'; C. Zanetti (yellow card) 78'	Stadium: San Siro; Attendance: 79,000; Referee: Alain Sars (France)

12 April 2005 Second leg	Internazionale (Italy)	0–3 (Awarded) (0–5 agg.)	(Italy) Milan	Milan, Italy
20:45 CEST (UTC+02:00)	González (yellow card) 4'; Córdoba (yellow card) 11'; Cambiasso (yellow card) 71'	Report	Ambrosini (yellow card) 7'; Shevchenko 30'; Nesta (yellow card) 43'	Stadium: San Siro; Attendance: 79,000; Referee: Markus Merk (Germany)
Note: The match was abandoned after 72 minutes when Milan goalkeeper Dida was struck by a firework from the stands. Milan were awarded a 3–0 win and advanced 5–0 on aggregate.

===== Semi-finals =====
26 April 2005 First leg	Milan (Italy)	2–0	(Netherlands) PSV Eindhoven	Milan, Italy
20:45 CEST (UTC+02:00)	Seedorf (yellow card) 18'; Shevchenko 42'; Tomasson 90'	Report	Gomes (yellow card) 28'; Ooijer (yellow card) 67'	Stadium: San Siro; Attendance: 75,000; Referee: Kyros Vassaras (Greece)

4 May 2005 Second leg	PSV Eindhoven (Netherlands)	3–1 (3–3a agg.)	(Italy) Milan	Eindhoven, Netherlands
20:45 CEST (UTC+02:00)	Park Ji-sung 9'; Cocu 65', 90+2'	Report	Ambrosini 90+1'	Stadium: Philips Stadion; Attendance: 35,000; Referee: Terje Hauge (Norway)

===== Final =====
25 May 2005 Final	Milan (Italy)	3–3 (2–3 p)	(England) Liverpool	Istanbul, Turkey
20:45 CEST (UTC+02:00)	Maldini 1'; Crespo 39', 44'	Report	Gerrard 54'; Šmicer 56'; Alonso (penalty missed) 60’ 60'; Carragher (yellow card) 76'; Baroš (yellow card) 81'	Stadium: Atatürk Olympic Stadium; Attendance: 70,025; Referee: Manuel Mejuto González (Spain)
	Penalties
	Serginho (penalty missed); Pirlo (penalty missed); Tomasson (penalty scored); Kaká (penalty scored); Shevchenko (penalty missed)		(penalty scored) Hamann; (penalty scored) Cissé; (penalty missed) Riise; (penalty scored) Šmicer

== Statistics ==
=== Appearances and goals ===
As of 31 June 2005

No.	Pos	Nat	Player	Total		Serie A		Coppa Italia		Champions League	
No.	Pos	Nat	Player	Apps	Goals	Apps	Goals	Apps	Goals	Apps	Goals
1	GK	(Brazil) BRA	Dida	49	0	36	0	0	0	13	0
2	DF	(Brazil) BRA	Cafu	45	1	31+2	1	0	0	12	0
13	DF	(Italy) ITA	Nesta	43	0	29	0	2+1	0	11	0
31	DF	(Netherlands) NED	Stam	27	1	15+2	0	2	0	8	1
3	DF	(Italy) ITA	Maldini	45	1	33	0	0	0	12	1
21	MF	(Italy) ITA	Pirlo	42	5	26+4	4	0+1	0	11	1
8	MF	(Italy) ITA	Gattuso	43	0	28+4	0	1	0	10	0
20	MF	(Netherlands) NED	Seedorf	48	7	26+6	5	3+1	1	11+1	1
22	MF	(Brazil) BRA	Kaká	49	9	33+3	7	0+1	0	11+1	2
7	FW	(Ukraine) UKR	Shevchenko	38	22	27+2	17	0	0	9	5
11	FW	(Argentina) ARG	Crespo	39	17	24+4	10	1	1	7+3	6
17	GK	(Italy) ITA	Abbiati	8	0	2+1	0	4	0	0+1	0
4	DF	(Georgia (country)) GEO	Kaladze	25	2	18+1	2	2	0	2+2	0
15	FW	(Denmark) DEN	Tomasson	38	9	17+13	6	3	2	2+3	1
10	MF	(Portugal) POR	Rui Costa	36	1	15+9	1	4	0	4+4	0
26	DF	(Italy) ITA	Pancaro	23	1	12+6	1	3+1	0	1	0
23	MF	(Italy) ITA	Ambrosini	36	4	9+13	1	4	2	3+7	1
5	DF	(Italy) ITA	Costacurta	22	0	8+6	0	3	0	2+3	0
24	MF	(France) FRA	Dhorasoo	19	0	8+4	0	3	0	1+3	0
32	MF	(Italy) ITA	Brocchi	16	1	7+4	0	3	1	1+1	0
27	MF	(Brazil) BRA	Serginho	30	6	6+16	5	3	1	1+4	0
9	FW	(Italy) ITA	Inzaghi	15	1	4+7	0	0+2	0	1+1	1
14	DF	(Croatia) CRO	Simic	3	0	2	0	0+1	0	0	0
19	DF	(Argentina) ARG	Coloccini	5	0	1	0	3	0	1	0
46	DF	(Italy) ITA	Marzoratti	1	0	1	0	0	0	0	0
30	DF	(Netherlands) NED	Esajas	1	0	0	0	0+1	0	0	0
47	DF	(Italy) ITA	Perticone	1	0	0+1	0	0	0	0	0

Last updated: 31 June 2005
Source: Competitions

== Legacy ==
In Turkey, the 2004–05 squad of Ac Milan is reckoned part of "general knowledge every person should know from memory" and is referred to as "Milan's Legendary Squad" (Turkish: Efsane Milan Kadrosu) and the following 11 is considered a squad every person, including those who are not interested in football, is expected to know: Dida (goalkeeper) - Cafu - Nesta - Stam - Maldini (defense) - Pirlo - Gattuso - Seedorf - Kaká (nidfield) - Shevchenko - Crespo/Inzaghi (forward). However, some contend that the actual Legendary Squad of AC Milan was the one between 1988 - 1994. While some others still refer to the 2004–05 squad as "the Legendary Squad of Milan" but extend the period and refer to the period of AC Milan between 2003 and 2007 as the "Legendary Period of Milan" (tr: Milanın Efsane Dönemi).
