= 2003 Coppa Italia final =

Italian football competition

55th Coppa Italia final
- Event: 2002–03 Coppa Italia
Roma	Milan
3	6

First leg
Roma	Milan
1	4
- Date: 20 May 2003
- Venue: Stadio Olimpico, Rome
- Referee: Gianluca Paparesta
- Attendance: 60,647

Second leg
Milan	Roma
2	2
- Date: 31 May 2003
- Venue: Stadio Giuseppe Meazza, Milan
- Referee: Roberto Rosetti
- Attendance: 76,061

The 2003 Coppa Italia final was the final of the 2002–03 Coppa Italia, the top cup competition in Italian football. The match was played over two legs on 20 May and 31 May 2003 between Roma and Milan. This was the 12th Coppa Italia final appearance by Milan and the 11th by Roma. It was the first meeting of these two clubs in the finals. Milan won the first leg 4–1, followed by a 2–2 in the second leg, giving Milan their 5th title on an aggregate score of 6–3.

== First leg ==
20 May 2003
20:45

Roma	1–4	Milan
Totti 28'		Serginho 62' (pen.), 73'; Ambrosini 70'; Shevchenko 89'

Stadio Olimpico, Rome
Attendance: 60,647
Referee: Gianluca Paparesta

Roma	Milan

GK	22	(Italy) Ivan Pelizzoli
CB	5	(France) Jonathan Zebina
CB	19	(Argentina) Walter Samuel
CB	23	(Italy) Christian Panucci	Booked
RM	2	(Brazil) Cafu		(yellow card) (substituted off) 86'
CM	17	(Italy) Damiano Tommasi
CM	11	(Brazil) Emerson		(substituted off) 80'
CM	15	(France) Olivier Dacourt
LM	32	(France) Vincent Candela
CF	18	(Italy) Antonio Cassano		(substituted off) 74'
CF	10	(Italy) Francesco Totti (c)
Reserves:
GK	12	(Italy) Carlo Zotti
DF	6	(Brazil) Aldair
DF	31	(Greece) Traianos Dellas
MF	20	(Italy) Davide Bombardini
MF	25	(Uruguay) Gianni Guigou		(substituted on) 86'
MF	27	(Italy) Daniele De Rossi		(substituted on) 80'
FW	24	(Italy) Marco Delvecchio		(substituted on) 74'
Manager:
(Italy) Fabio Capello

GK	18	(Italy) Christian Abbiati	Booked
RB	14	(Croatia) Dario Šimić		(substituted off) 69'
CB	24	(Denmark) Martin Laursen
CB	25	(Brazil) Roque Júnior
LB	2	(Denmark) Thomas Helveg	Booked
RM	32	(Italy) Cristian Brocchi	Booked
CM	23	(Italy) Massimo Ambrosini (c)	Booked
CM	5	(Argentina) Fernando Redondo
LM	27	(Brazil) Serginho		(substituted off) 86'
CF	11	(Brazil) Rivaldo
CF	15	(Denmark) Jon Dahl Tomasson	Booked	(substituted off) 71'
Reserves:
GK	1	(Italy) Valerio Fiori
DF	4	(Georgia (country)) Kakha Kaladze		(substituted on) 69'
DF	13	(Italy) Alessandro Nesta
MF	21	(Italy) Andrea Pirlo
MF	28	(Italy) Samuele Dalla Bona		(substituted on) 86'
MF	31	(France) Ibrahim Ba
FW	7	(Ukraine) Andriy Shevchenko		(substituted on) 71'
Manager:
(Italy) Carlo Ancelotti

== Second leg ==
31 May 2003
20:45

Milan	2–2	Roma
Rivaldo 65'; Inzaghi 90+3'		Totti 56', 64'

San Siro, Milan
Attendance: 76,061
Referee: Roberto Rosetti

Milan	Roma

GK	18	(Italy) Christian Abbiati
RB	14	(Croatia) Dario Šimić		(substituted off) 83'
CB	13	(Italy) Alessandro Nesta
CB	24	(Denmark) Martin Laursen
LB	3	(Italy) Paolo Maldini (c)
CM	8	(Italy) Gennaro Gattuso	Booked	(substituted off) 89'
CM	5	(Argentina) Fernando Redondo	Booked
RM	20	(Netherlands) Clarence Seedorf		(substituted off) 60'
AM	11	(Brazil) Rivaldo
LM	27	(Brazil) Serginho
CF	9	(Italy) Filippo Inzaghi
Reserves:
GK	12	(Brazil) Dida
DF	2	(Denmark) Thomas Helveg		(substituted on) 83'
DF	4	(Georgia (country)) Kakha Kaladze		(substituted on) 89'
MF	31	(France) Ibrahim Ba
MF	10	(Portugal) Rui Costa		(substituted on) 60'
MF	21	(Italy) Andrea Pirlo
MF	28	(Italy) Samuele Dalla Bona
Manager:
(Italy) Carlo Ancelotti

GK	22	(Italy) Ivan Pelizzoli
RB	5	(France) Jonathan Zebina	Booked
CB	19	(Argentina) Walter Samuel
CB	23	(Italy) Christian Panucci
LB	32	(France) Vincent Candela		(substituted off) 85'
RM	17	(Italy) Damiano Tommasi		(substituted off) 54'
CM	11	(Brazil) Emerson
CM	15	(France) Olivier Dacourt	Booked	(substituted off) 78'
LM	8	(Brazil) Francisco Lima
CF	18	(Italy) Antonio Cassano	Sent off (straight red)
CF	10	(Italy) Francesco Totti (c)	Sent off (straight red)
Reserves:
GK	34	(Italy) Marco Paoloni
MF	7	(Italy) Diego Fuser		(substituted on) 85'
FW	9	(Italy) Vincenzo Montella
DF	13	(Argentina) Leandro Cufré
FW	24	(Italy) Marco Delvecchio		(substituted on) 54'
MF	25	(Uruguay) Gianni Guigou
MF	27	(Italy) Daniele De Rossi		(substituted on) 78'
Manager:
(Italy) Fabio Capello

== See also ==
- 2002–03 AC Milan season
- 2002–03 AS Roma season
