= 1999–2000 Ternana Calcio season =

Ternana Calcio
1999–2000 season
- Manager: Vincenzo Guerini (until February); Tarcisio Burgnich (from February)
- Stadium: Stadio Libero Liberati
- Serie B: 10th
- Coppa Italia: Second round
- Top goalscorer: League: Fabio Artico (10); All: Fabio Artico (10)
- Biggest win: Ternana 3–0 Cosenza
- Biggest defeat: Brescia 3–0 Ternana

The 1999–2000 season was Ternana Calcio's 75th season in existence and third consecutive in the Serie B, the second division of Italian football. They also competed in the Coppa Italia.

== Players ==
=== First-team squad ===
Note: Flags indicate national team as defined under FIFA eligibility rules; some limited exceptions apply. Players may hold more than one non-FIFA nationality.

No.	Pos.	Nation	Player
—	GK	ITA	Daniele Balli
—	GK	ITA	Paolo Fabbri
—	DF	ITA	Dario Baccin
—	DF	ITA	Cristian Stellini
—	DF	ITA	Dimitri Birk
—	DF	ITA	Marino D'Aloisio
—	DF	ITA	Daniele Giannini
—	DF	ITA	Gianluca Grava
—	DF	ITA	Settimio Lucci
—	DF	ITA	Simone Moretti
—	DF	ITA	Carlo Sassarini
—	DF	ITA	Cristian Servidei
—	DF	ITA	Cristian Stellini
—	DF	ITA	Carlo Teodorani

No.	Pos.	Nation	Player
—	MF	ITA	Luca Cavallo
—	MF	ITA	Davide Cordone
—	MF	ITA	Alessandro Cucciari
—	MF	ITA	Fabrizio Fabris
—	MF	AUS	Vince Grella
—	MF	ITA	Riccardo Rovinelli
—	FW	ITA	Fabio Artico
—	FW	ITA	Francesco Baiano
—	FW	ITA	Massimo Borgobello
—	FW	ITA	Pierpaolo Bresciani
—	FW	ITA	Enrico Buonocore
—	FW	ITA	Fabrizio Miccoli
—	FW	ITA	Giovanni Tiberi

== Competitions ==
=== Overall record ===
Competition	First match	Last match	Starting round	Final position	Record							
Competition	First match	Last match	Starting round	Final position	Pld	W	D	L	GF	GA	GD	Win %
Serie B	29 August 1999	11 June 2000	Matchday 1	10th	38	11	16	11	45	47	−2	28.95
Coppa Italia	15 August 1999	27 October 1999	Group stage	Second round	8	4	3	1	13	7	+6	50.00
Total					46	15	19	12	58	54	+4	32.61

Source: Competitions

=== Serie B ===
==== League table ====
Pos	Team	Pld	W	D	L	GF	GA	GD	Pts
8	Treviso	38	13	12	13	56	48	+8	51
9	Empoli	38	13	12	13	42	52	−10	51
10	Ternana	38	11	16	11	45	47	−2	49
11	Ravenna	38	11	15	12	41	39	+2	48
12	Cosenza	38	11	15	12	36	41	−5	48

Source: Almanacco Illustrato del Calcio - La Storia 1898-2004, Panini Edizioni, Modena, September 2005
Rules for classification: 1) points; 2) head-to-head points; 3) head-to-head goal difference; 4) head-to-head goals scored; 5) goal difference; 6) number of goals scored.

==== Results summary ====
Overall								Home						Away					
Pld	W	D	L	GF	GA	GD	Pts	W	D	L	GF	GA	GD	W	D	L	GF	GA	GD
38	11	16	11	45	47	−2	49	7	10	2	27	20	+7	4	6	9	18	27	−9

Source: Worldfootball

==== Results by round ====
Round	1	2	3	4	5	6	7	8	9	10	11	12	13	14	15	16	17	18	19	20	21	22	23	24	25	26	27	28	29	30	31	32	33	34	35	36	37	38
Ground	A	H	H	A	H	A	H	A	H	A	A	H	A	H	A	H	A	H	A	H	A	A	H	A	H	A	H	A	H	H	A	H	A	H	A	H	A	H
Result	L	W	W	W	D	D	D	L	D	L	D	D	L	W	W	D	D	D	L	D	L	D	L	W	L	D	D	L	W	W	D	D	L	W	L	D	W	W
Position	19	10	5	2	5	5	6	7	8	10	11	10	14	12	8	9	9	10	12	12	14	15	17	14	16	16	15	16	16	13	13	14	16	14	16	15	15	10

Source: Worldfootball
A = Away; H = Home; W = Win; D = Draw; L = Loss

==== Matches ====
29 August 1999 1	Genoa	2–0	Ternana	Genoa
	Francioso 63' (pen.); Manetti 87'			Stadium: Stadio Luigi Ferraris; Referee: Pierpaolo Rossi

5 September 1999 2	Ternana	1–0	Alzano Virescit	Rieti
	Miccoli 74'			Stadium: Stadio Centro d'Italia – Manlio Scopigno; Referee: Roberto Pirrone

12 September 1999 3	Ternana	1–0	Vicenza	Terni
				Stadium: Stadio Libero Liberati

19 September 1999 4	Chievo	0–1	Ternana	Verona
				Stadium: Stadio Marcantonio Bentegodi

26 September 1999 5	Ternana	1–1	Atalanta	Terni
				Stadium: Stadio Libero Liberati

3 October 1999 6	Sampdoria	2–2	Ternana	Genoa

10 October 1999 7	Ternana	2–2	Cesena	Terni
				Stadium: Stadio Libero Liberati

24 October 1999 8	Brescia	3–0	Ternana	Brescia
				Stadium: Stadio Mario Rigamonti

31 October 1999 9	Ternana	2–2	Napoli	Terni
				Stadium: Stadio Libero Liberati

7 November 1999 10	Treviso	3–1	Ternana	Treviso
				Stadium: Stadio Omobono Tenni

14 November 1999 11	Cosenza	1–1	Ternana	Cosenza
				Stadium: Stadio San Vito

21 November 1999 12	Ternana	1–1	Pescara	Terni
				Stadium: Stadio Libero Liberati

28 November 1999 13	Ravenna	1–0	Ternana	Ravenna
				Stadium: Stadio Bruno Benelli

12 December 1999 15	Savoia	0–1	Ternana	Torre Annunziata
				Stadium: Stadio Alfredo Giraud

15 December 1999 14	Ternana	1–0	Pistoiese	Terni
				Stadium: Stadio Libero Liberati

19 December 1999 16	Ternana	1–1	Empoli	Terni
				Stadium: Stadio Libero Liberati

6 January 2000 17	Monza	2–2	Ternana	Monza
				Stadium: Stadio Brianteo

9 January 2000 18	Ternana	1–1	Salernitana	Terni
				Stadium: Stadio Libero Liberati

16 January 2000 19	Fermana	2–1	Ternana	Fermo
				Stadium: Stadio Bruno Recchioni

23 January 2000 20	Ternana	2–2	Genoa	Terni
	Lucci (red card) 15'; Grava 39'; Artico 44' (pen.)		Francioso 16' (pen.); Carparelli 37'; Torrente (red card) 70'	Stadium: Stadio Libero Liberati; Referee: Nicola Ayroldi

30 January 2000 21	Alzano Virescit	1–0	Ternana	Alzano Lombardo
	Romualdi 56'			Stadium: Stadio Carillo Pesenti Pigna

13 February 2000 22	Vicenza	0–0	Ternana	Vicenza
				Stadium: Stadio Romeo Menti

18 February 2000 23	Ternana	1–3	Chievo	Terni
				Stadium: Stadio Libero Liberati

27 February 2000 24	Atalanta	1–2	Ternana	Bergamo
				Stadium: Stadio Atleti Azzurri d'Italia

5 March 2000 25	Ternana	0–1	Sampdoria	Terni
			Dionigi 55'	Stadium: Stadio Libero Liberati

12 March 2000 26	Cesena	1–1	Ternana	Cesena
				Stadium: Stadio Dino Manuzzi

19 March 2000 27	Ternana	2–2	Brescia	Terni
				Stadium: Stadio Libero Liberati

26 March 2000 28	Napoli	2–0	Ternana	Naples
				Stadium: Stadio San Paolo

2 April 2000 29	Ternana	1–0	Treviso	Terni
				Stadium: Stadio Libero Liberati

9 April 2000 30	Ternana	3–0	Cosenza	Terni
				Stadium: Stadio Libero Liberati

22 April 2000 31	Pescara	1–1	Ternana	Pescara
				Stadium: Stadio Adriatico; Referee: Pierangelo Pin

30 April 2000 32	Ternana	0–0	Ravenna	Terni
				Stadium: Stadio Libero Liberati

5 May 2000 33	Pistoiese	3–2	Ternana	Pistoia
				Stadium: Stadio Marcello Melani

14 May 2000 34	Ternana	3–1	Savoia	Terni
				Stadium: Stadio Libero Liberati

21 May 2000 35	Empoli	2–1	Ternana	Empoli
				Stadium: Stadio Carlo Castellani

28 May 2000 36	Ternana	2–2	Monza	Terni
	Bresciani 37'; Stellini 87'		Mazzeo 9'; Brnčić 16'; Vignaroli (red card) 45'	Stadium: Stadio Libero Liberati; Referee: Pierluigi Collina

4 June 2000 37	Salernitana	0–2	Ternana	Salerno
			Artico 24', 28'	Stadium: Stadio Arechi; Referee: Gennaro Borriello

11 June 2000 38	Ternana	2–1	Fermana	Terni
	Artico 27' (pen.); Fabris 28'		Václav Koloušek 22'	Stadium: Stadio Libero Liberati

=== Coppa Italia ===
==== Group stage ====
15 August 1999 1	Ternana	2–2	Fidelis Andria	Rieti
20:30				Stadium: Stadio Centro d'Italia – Manlio Scopigno; Attendance: 2,117; Referee: Daniele Tombolini

18 August 1999 2	Lecce	1–1	Ternana	Lecce
20:30				Stadium: Stadio Via del mare Attendance: 8,715; Referee: Pier Paolo Rossi

22 August 1999 3	Ternana	3–0	Lucchese	Ravenna
20:30				Stadium: Stadio Bruno Benelli; Attendance: 396; Referee: Andrea Zaltron

25 August 1999 4	Lucchese	1–2	Ternana	Lucca
20:45				Stadium: Stadio Porta Elisa; Attendance: 925; Referee: Andrea Guiducci

1 September 1999 5	Fidelis Andria	0–1	Ternana	Bari
17:30				Stadium: Stadio San Nicola; Attendance: 184; Referee: Marco Gabriele

15 September 1999 6	Ternana	2–0	Lecce	Terni
20:30				Stadium: Stadio Libero Liberati; Attendance: 4,059; Referee: Stefano Braschi

==== Second round ====
13 October 1999 First leg	Ternana	1–2	Perugia	Terni
				Stadium: Stadio Libero Liberati; Referee: Fiorenzo Treossi

27 October 1999 Second leg	Perugia	1–1 (3–2 agg.)	Ternana	Perugia
	Ba 90'		Stellini 14'	Stadium: Stadio Renato Curi; Referee: Alfredo Trentalange
