= 2002–03 AC Milan season =

Milan
2002–03 season
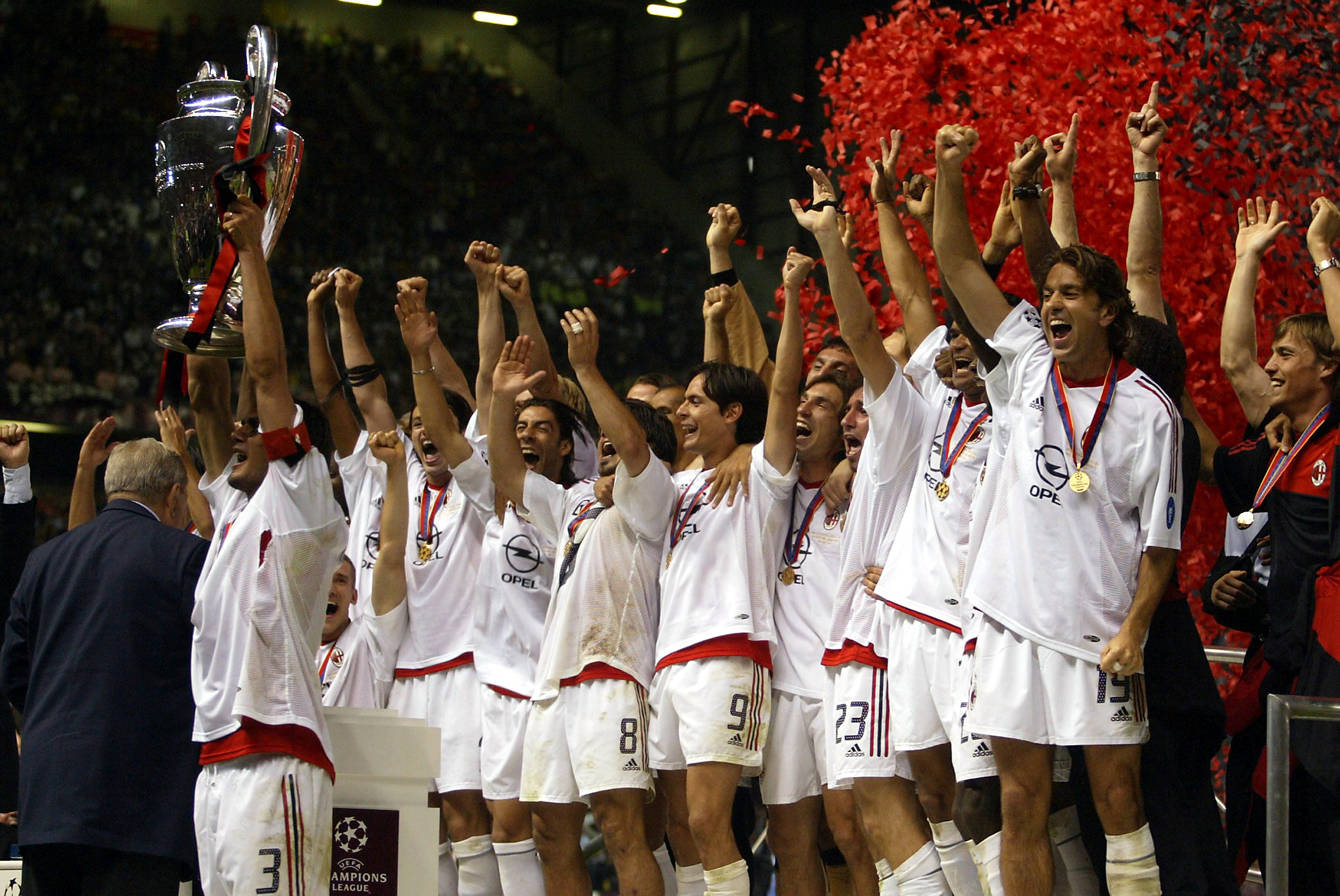
- AC Milan players celebrating winning the 2003 UEFA Champions League final
- President: Silvio Berlusconi
- Manager: Carlo Ancelotti
- Stadium: San Siro
- Serie A: 3rd
- Coppa Italia: Winners
- UEFA Champions League: Winners
- Top goalscorer: League: Filippo Inzaghi (17); All: Filippo Inzaghi (30)
- Highest home attendance: 78,843 (Serie A) vs Internazionale (23 November 2002)
- Lowest home attendance: 2,551 (Coppa Italia) vs Ancona (18 December 2002)
- Average home league attendance: 61,534
Home colours	Away colours	Third colours

In 2002–03, Associazione Calcio Milan enjoyed a triumphant season, winning both the UEFA Champions League and the Coppa Italia. In their 6th conquest of Europe's most prestigious competition, Milan defeated fierce rivals Juventus on penalties after a 0–0 draw in an all-Italian final, while in the Coppa Italia they overcame Roma. In the Serie A, Milan were top of the table in January, but would eventually finish third behind Juventus and Inter, thus missing the chance to complete the treble.

This was Milan's first successful season since 1998–99. Important new arrivals included Italian international centre-back Alessandro Nesta (signed from Lazio for €31 million –Milan's most expensive transfer in the summer of 2002) who strengthened a defence that was already among Europe's most formidable, versatile Dutch international midfielder Clarence Seedorf (signed from cross-city rivals Inter for €29 million) and Danish international striker Jon Dahl Tomasson, who was mainly used to back up regular starters Andriy Shevchenko and Filippo Inzaghi. Brazilian superstar Rivaldo, the most high-profile of the new signings, had a peripheral role in the Serie A, but was influential in the Champions League, appearing in 13 out of 17 matches, although not in the final, where he was an unused substitute.

This season also saw Milan manager Carlo Ancelotti beginning to utilise the unconventional 4–4–2 diamond (or 4–1–2–1–2) formation, which he would continue to employ on many occasions in later seasons. This formation allowed Ancelotti to field both Andrea Pirlo and Rui Costa in the starting eleven, with Pirlo as a deep-lying playmaker or regista and Rui Costa as an attacking midfielder or trequartista; the 4–1–2–1–2 worked well for Milan in large part thanks to the effectiveness, hard work and stamina of central midfielders Clarence Seedorf and Gennaro Gattuso.

== Players ==
Squad at end of season

Note: Flags indicate national team as defined under FIFA eligibility rules; some limited exceptions apply. Players may hold more than one non-FIFA nationality.

No.	Pos.	Nation	Player
1	GK	ITA	Valerio Fiori
2	DF	DEN	Thomas Helveg
3	DF	ITA	Paolo Maldini (captain)
4	DF	GEO	Kakha Kaladze
5	MF	ARG	Fernando Redondo
7	FW	UKR	Andriy Shevchenko
8	MF	ITA	Gennaro Gattuso
9	FW	ITA	Filippo Inzaghi
10	MF	POR	Rui Costa
11	FW	BRA	Rivaldo
12	GK	BRA	Dida
13	DF	ITA	Alessandro Nesta
14	DF	CRO	Dario Šimić

No.	Pos.	Nation	Player
15	FW	DEN	Jon Dahl Tomasson
16	DF	ARG	José Chamot
18	GK	ITA	Christian Abbiati
19	DF	ITA	Alessandro Costacurta (vice-captain)
20	MF	NED	Clarence Seedorf
21	MF	ITA	Andrea Pirlo
23	MF	ITA	Massimo Ambrosini
24	DF	DEN	Martin Laursen
25	DF	BRA	Roque Júnior
27	DF	BRA	Serginho
28	MF	ITA	Samuele Dalla Bona
31	MF	FRA	Ibrahim Ba
32	MF	ITA	Cristian Brocchi

=== Transfers ===
In
Pos.	Name	from	Type
DF	Alessandro Nesta	Lazio	€31.00 million
MF	Clarence Seedorf	Inter	€22.50 million
DF	Dario Šimić	Inter	€5.00 million
MF	Samuele Dalla Bona	Chelsea	€1.60 million
FW	Rivaldo	Barcelona	free
FW	Jon Dahl Tomasson	Feyenoord	free
FW	Marco Borriello	Treviso	loan ended
MF	Pablo García	Venezia	loan ended
GK	Gabriele Aldegani	Cosenza	loan ended
GK	Dida	Corinthians	loan ended
DF	Samir Beloufa	Germinal Beerschot	loan ended
DF	Francesco Coco	Barcelona	loan ended
DF	Fabricio Coloccini	Alavés	loan ended

Out
Pos.	Name	to	Type
DF	Francesco Coco	Inter	€22.50 million
MF	Ümit Davala	Inter	€2.00 million
GK	Sebastiano Rossi	Perugia	
DF	Samir Beloufa	Bastia	
DF	Cosmin Contra	Atlético Madrid	
FW	José Mari	Atlético Madrid	
FW	Javi Moreno	Atlético Madrid	
GK	Gabriele Aldegani	Livorno	loan
MF	Demetrio Albertini	Atlético Madrid	loan
DF	Fabricio Coloccini	Atlético Madrid	loan
DF	Mohamed Sarr	Galatasaray	loan
MF	Marco Donadel	Lecce	loan
MF	Massimo Donati	Parma	loan
MF	Pablo García	Osasuna	loan
FW	Mohammed Aliyu Datti	Siena	loan
FW	Vitali Kutuzov	Sporting CP	loan
FW	Marco Simone	Monaco	loan ended

==== Autumn ====
In
Pos.	Name	from	Type
MF	Leonardo		free

==== Winter ====
In
Pos.	Name	from	Type
DF	Mohamed Sarr	Galatasaray	loan ended
MF	Massimo Donati	Parma	loan ended

Out
Pos.	Name	to	Type
DF	Mohamed Sarr	Ancona	loan
MF	Massimo Donati	Torino	loan
FW	Marco Borriello	Empoli	loan

==== Spring ====
Out
Pos.	Name	To	Type
MF	Leonardo		retired

== Reserve squad ==
Note: Flags indicate national team as defined under FIFA eligibility rules; some limited exceptions apply. Players may hold more than one non-FIFA nationality.

No.	Pos.	Nation	Player
17	DF	BRA	Claiton
34	FW	ITA	Alessandro Matri
36	MF	ITA	Stefano Pastrello
37	MF	ITA	Roberto Bortolotto
38	FW	ITA	Davide Favaro
39	FW	ITA	Michele Piccolo
40	MF	ITA	Mauro Calvi

No.	Pos.	Nation	Player
41	MF	ITA	Mattia Dal Bello
42	MF	ITA	Mirko Stefani
43	GK	ITA	Alessandro Venditti
44	MF	ITA	Patrick Kalambay
45	DF	ITA	Matteo Giordano
46	MF	ITA	William Nava
83	MF	GAB	Catilina Aubameyang

=== Left club during season ===
Note: Flags indicate national team as defined under FIFA eligibility rules; some limited exceptions apply. Players may hold more than one non-FIFA nationality.

No.	Pos.	Nation	Player
22	GK	ITA	Alessandro Parravicini (released)
30	FW	ITA	Marco Borriello (on loan to Empoli)

No.	Pos.	Nation	Player
33	MF	BRA	Leonardo (retired)
35	GK	ITA	Simone Brunelli (released)

== Competitions ==
Win Draw Loss

=== Serie A ===
==== League table ====
Pos	Team	Pld	W	D	L	GF	GA	GD	Pts	Qualification or relegation
1	Juventus (C)	34	21	9	4	64	29	+35	72	Qualification to Champions League group stage
2	Internazionale	34	19	8	7	64	38	+26	65	Qualification to Champions League group stage
3	Milan (Note: Milan qualified for the Champions League group stage as defending champions.)	34	18	7	9	55	30	+25	61	Qualification to Champions League group stage
4	Lazio	34	15	15	4	57	32	+25	60	Qualification to Champions League third qualifying round
5	Parma	34	15	11	8	55	36	+19	56 (Note: Parma finished ahead of Udinese on head-to-head points: Udinese 1–1 Parma, Parma 3–2 Udinese.)	Qualification to UEFA Cup first round

Source: 2002–03 Serie A, Soccerway
Rules for classification: 1) Points; 2) Head-to-head points; 3) Head-to-head goal difference; 4) Goal difference; 5) Goals scored; 6) Draw. (Note: Head-to-head record is used only after all the matches between the teams in question have been played).
(C) Champions

==== Results summary ====
Overall								Home						Away					
Pld	W	D	L	GF	GA	GD	Pts	W	D	L	GF	GA	GD	W	D	L	GF	GA	GD
34	18	7	9	55	30	+25	61	12	4	1	32	11	+21	6	3	8	23	19	+4

Source: Competitive matches

==== Results by round ====
Round	1	2	3	4	5	6	7	8	9	10	11	12	13	14	15	16	17	18	19	20	21	22	23	24	25	26	27	28	29	30	31	32	33	34
Ground	A	H	A	H	A	A	H	H	A	H	H	A	H	A	H	A	H	A	H	A	H	A	H	H	A	H	A	A	H	A	H	A	H	A
Result	W	W	D	W	W	L	W	W	L	W	W	D	W	W	D	W	W	L	W	L	D	W	D	D	D	W	L	W	L	L	W	L	W	L
Position	1	1	2	2	1	2	2	2	3	3	1	2	1	1	1	1	1	1	1	2	3	3	3	3	3	3	3	2	3	3	3	3	3	3

Source: Competitive matches
A = Away; H = Home; W = Win; D = Draw; L = Loss; = Leader, 2003–04 UEFA Champions League group stage; = 2003–04 UEFA Champions League group stage; = 2003–04 UEFA Champions League qualifying round; = 2003–04 UEFA Cup; = 2003–04 Serie B

==== Matches ====
14 September 2002 2	Modena	0–3	Milan	Modena
20:30 CEST (UTC+02:00)		Report	Inzaghi 17', 90'; Šimić 54'	Stadium: Stadio Alberto Braglia; Attendance: 15,349; Referee: Massimo De Santis

21 September 2002 3	Milan	3–0	Perugia	Milan
18:00 CEST (UTC+02:00)	Maldini 40'; Inzaghi 50'; Seedorf 65'	Report		Stadium: San Siro; Attendance: 59,296; Referee: Massimiliano Saccani

28 September 2002 4	Lazio	1–1	Milan	Rome
20:30 CEST (UTC+02:00)	C. López 51'	Report	Maldini 7'	Stadium: Stadio Olimpico; Attendance: 59,226; Referee: Roberto Rosetti

6 October 2002 5	Milan	6–0	Torino	Milan
15:00 CEST (UTC+02:00)	Pirlo 21' (pen.); Inzaghi 31', 79', 86'; Serginho 41'; Fattori 84' (o.g.)	Report		Stadium: San Siro; Attendance: 60,945; Referee: Matteo Trefoloni

20 October 2002 6	Atalanta	1–4	Milan	Bergamo
15:00 CEST (UTC+02:00)	Sala 30'	Report	Rivaldo 15'; Tomasson 41'; Pirlo 66' (pen.), 81'	Stadium: Stadio Atleti Azzurri d'Italia; Attendance: 23,628; Referee: Gianluca Paparesta

26 October 2002 7	Chievo	3–2	Milan	Verona
18:00 CEST (UTC+02:00)	Marazzina 22'; Bierhoff 49'; Cossato 83'	Report	Shevchenko 59'; Tomasson 90+4'	Stadium: Stadio Marc'Antonio Bentegodi; Attendance: 33,431; Referee: Salvatore Racalbuto

3 November 2002 8	Milan	2–0	Reggina	Milan
15:00 CET (UTC+01:00)	Inzaghi 20'; Rivaldo 64'	Report		Stadium: San Siro; Attendance: 63,892; Referee: Massimo De Santis

6 November 2002 1	Milan	1–0	Udinese	Milan
20:30 CET (UTC+01:00)	Rivaldo 89'	Report		Stadium: San Siro; Attendance: 53,347; Referee: Paolo Bertini
Note: Rescheduled

10 November 2002 9	Juventus	2–1	Milan	Turin
20:30 CET (UTC+01:00)	Di Vaio 8'; Thuram 21'	Report	Pirlo 32' (pen.)	Stadium: Stadio delle Alpi; Attendance: 57,762; Referee: Gianluca Paparesta

17 November 2002 10	Milan	2–1	Parma	Milan
15:00 CET (UTC+01:00)	Pirlo 48' (pen.), 70' (pen.)	Report	Filippini 63'	Stadium: San Siro; Attendance: 59,648; Referee: Paolo Bertini

23 November 2002 11	Milan	1–0	Internazionale	Milan
20:30 CET (UTC+01:00)	Serginho 13'	Report		Stadium: San Siro; Attendance: 78,843; Referee: Gianluca Paparesta

1 December 2002 12	Empoli	1–1	Milan	Empoli
15:00 CET (UTC+01:00)	Rocchi 42'	Report	Shevchenko 52'	Stadium: Stadio Carlo Castellani; Attendance: 17,652; Referee: Massimo De Santis

7 December 2002 13	Milan	1–0	Roma	Milan
20:30 CET (UTC+01:00)	Inzaghi 73'	Report		Stadium: San Siro; Attendance: 67,786; Referee: Pierluigi Collina

15 December 2002 14	Como	1–2	Milan	Como
15:00 CET (UTC+01:00)	Pecchia 22'	Report	Ambrosini 20'; Shevchenko 42'	Stadium: Stadio Giuseppe Sinigaglia; Attendance: 10,508; Referee: Stefano Farina

22 December 2002 15	Milan	0–0	Brescia	Milan
15:00 CET (UTC+01:00)		Report		Stadium: San Siro; Attendance: 61,724; Referee: Emidio Morganti

12 January 2003 16	Bologna	0–2	Milan	Bologna
15:00 CET (UTC+01:00)		Report	Shevchenko 51'; Serginho 78'	Stadium: Stadio Renato Dall'Ara; Attendance: 34,915; Referee: Alfredo Trentalange

19 January 2003 17	Milan	2–1	Piacenza	Milan
15:00 CET (UTC+01:00)	Pirlo 54' (pen.); Rivaldo 69'	Report	Gurenko 53'	Stadium: San Siro; Attendance: 54,452; Referee: Massimo De Santis

26 January 2003 18	Udinese	1–0	Milan	Udine
20:30 CET (UTC+01:00)	Pizarro 37' (pen.)	Report		Stadium: Stadio Friuli; Attendance: 22,853; Referee: Gianluca Paparesta

2 February 2003 19	Milan	2–1	Modena	Milan
15:00 CET (UTC+01:00)	Pirlo 77' (pen.); Inzaghi 80'	Report	Scoponi 90+1'	Stadium: San Siro; Attendance: 59,594; Referee: Matteo Trefoloni

9 February 2003 20	Perugia	1–0	Milan	Perugia
15:00 CET (UTC+01:00)	Miccoli 36'	Report		Stadium: Stadio Renato Curi; Attendance: 18,853; Referee: Paolo Dondarini

16 February 2003 21	Milan	2–2	Lazio	Milan
20:30 CET (UTC+01:00)	Inzaghi 62'; Rivaldo 70'	Report	Stanković 21'; C. López 30' (pen.)	Stadium: San Siro; Attendance: 61,605; Referee: Pierluigi Collina

22 February 2003 22	Torino	0–3; Abandoned^{1}	Milan	Turin
20:30 CET (UTC+01:00)		Report	Inzaghi 2'; Seedorf 43', 45+3'	Stadium: Stadio delle Alpi; Attendance: 16,343; Referee: Luca Palanca

2 March 2003 23	Milan	3–3	Atalanta	Milan
15:00 CET (UTC+01:00)	Inzaghi 34', 79'; Tomasson 70'	Report	Maldini 1' (o.g.); Rossini 29', 31'	Stadium: San Siro; Attendance: 60,095; Referee: Stefano Farina

9 March 2003 24	Milan	0–0	Chievo	Milan
20:30 CET (UTC+01:00)		Report		Stadium: San Siro; Attendance: 56,123; Referee: Massimo De Santis

15 March 2003 25	Reggina	0–0	Milan	Reggio Calabria
18:00 CET (UTC+01:00)		Report		Stadium: Stadio Oreste Granillo; Attendance: 26,640; Referee: Matteo Trefoloni

22 March 2003 26	Milan	2–1	Juventus	Milan
20:30 CET (UTC+01:00)	Shevchenko 4'; Inzaghi 25'	Report	Nedvěd 10'	Stadium: San Siro; Attendance: 78,671; Referee: Matteo Trefoloni

5 April 2003 27	Parma	1–0	Milan	Parma
20:30 CEST (UTC+02:00)	Adriano 77'	Report		Stadium: Stadio Ennio Tardini; Attendance: 25,603; Referee: Stefano Farina

12 April 2003 28	Internazionale	0–1	Milan	Milan
20:30 CEST (UTC+02:00)		Report	Inzaghi 62'	Stadium: San Siro; Attendance: 76,660; Referee: Roberto Rosetti

19 April 2003 29	Milan	0–1	Empoli	Milan
15:00 CEST (UTC+02:00)		Report	Di Natale 12'	Stadium: San Siro; Attendance: 57,784; Referee: Domenico Messina

26 April 2003 30	Roma	2–1	Milan	Rome
20:30 CEST (UTC+02:00)	Cassano 60'; Tommasi 76'	Report	Tomasson 81'	Stadium: Stadio Olimpico; Attendance: 60,313; Referee: Gianluca Paparesta

3 May 2003 31	Milan	2–0	Como	Milan
15:00 CEST (UTC+02:00)	Inzaghi 11' (pen.); Nesta 59'	Report		Stadium: San Siro; Attendance: 54,503; Referee: Paolo Dondarini

10 May 2003 32	Brescia	1–0	Milan	Brescia
15:00 CEST (UTC+02:00)	Appiah 84'	Report		Stadium: Stadio Mario Rigamonti; Attendance: 19,155; Referee: Pierluigi Collina

17 May 2003 33	Milan	3–1	Bologna	Milan
15:00 CEST (UTC+02:00)	Pirlo 23' (pen.); Seedorf 51'; Inzaghi 66'	Report	Meghni 68'	Stadium: San Siro; Attendance: 57,766; Referee: Matteo Trefoloni

24 May 2003 34	Piacenza	4–2	Milan	Piacenza
15:00 CEST (UTC+02:00)	Hübner 6', 82'; Maresca 17' (pen.); Marchionni 31'	Report	Brocchi 30' (pen.), 90+2'	Stadium: Stadio Leonardo Garilli; Attendance: 7,386; Referee: Nicola Rizzoli

Notes

- Note 1: Torino v Milan was abandoned with 27 minutes to go, after the crowd started to riot. The result was confirmed as 3–0 in favor of Milan by the FIGC. Torino was given a match suspension from playing at home until the end of season.

=== Coppa Italia ===
==== Round of 16 ====
3 December 2002 First leg	Ancona	1–1	Milan	Ancona
21:00 CET (UTC+01:00)	Robbiati 5'	Report	Leonardo 45'	Stadium: Stadio del Conero; Attendance: 21,498; Referee: Massimiliano Saccani

18 December 2002 Second leg	Milan	5–1 (6–2 agg.)	Ancona	Milan
21:00 CET (UTC+01:00)	Rui Costa 9'; Tomasson 12', 39'; Borriello 69'; Leonardo 88'	Report	Ganz 7'	Stadium: San Siro; Attendance: 2,551; Referee: Tiziano Pieri

==== Quarter-finals ====
14 January 2003 First leg	Milan	0–0	Chievo	Milan
21:00 CET (UTC+01:00)		Report		Stadium: San Siro; Attendance: 3,598; Referee: Paolo Dondarini

22 January 2003 Second leg	Chievo	2–5 (2–5 agg.)	Milan	Verona
21:00 CET (UTC+01:00)	Beghetto 69'; Franceschini 81'	Report	Kaladze 1'; Seedorf 43', 63'; Tomasson 45'; Dalla Bona 84'	Stadium: Stadio Marc'Antonio Bentegodi; Attendance: 7,350; Referee: Domenico Messina

==== Semi-finals ====
6 February 2003 First leg	Perugia	0–0	Milan	Perugia
21:00 CET (UTC+01:00)		Report		Stadium: Stadio Renato Curi; Attendance: 12,000; Referee: Nicola Ayroldi

15 April 2003 Second leg	Milan	2–1 (2–1 agg.)	Perugia	Milan
21:00 CEST (UTC+02:00)	Tomasson 41'; Nesta 52'	Report	Caracciolo 83'	Stadium: San Siro; Attendance: 9,605; Referee: Pasquale Rodomonti

==== Final ====
20 May 2003 First leg	Roma	1–4	Milan	Rome
20:45 CEST (UTC+02:00)	Totti 28'	Report	Serginho 62' (pen.), 72'; Ambrosini 70'; Shevchenko 89'	Stadium: Stadio Olimpico; Attendance: 60,647; Referee: Gianluca Paparesta

31 May 2003 Second leg	Milan	2–2 (6–3 agg.)	Roma	Milan
20:45 CEST (UTC+02:00)	Rivaldo 65'; Inzaghi 90+4'	Report	Totti 56', 64'	Stadium: San Siro; Attendance: 76,061; Referee: Roberto Rosetti

=== UEFA Champions League ===
==== Third qualifying round ====
14 August 2002 First leg	Milan (Italy)	1–0	(Czech Republic) Slovan Liberec	Milan, Italy
20:30 CEST (UTC+02:00)	Gattuso (yellow card) 45+3'; Serginho (yellow card) 59'; Inzaghi 68'	Report	Pilný (yellow card) 39'	Stadium: San Siro; Attendance: 30,064; Referee: Konrad Plautz (Austria)

28 August 2002 Second leg	Slovan Liberec (Czech Republic)	2–1 (2–2a agg.)	(Italy) Milan	Liberec, Czech Republic
21:00 CEST (UTC+02:00)	Slepička 46'; Langer 88'	Report	Inzaghi 20'	Stadium: Stadion u Nisy; Attendance: 8,740; Referee: Arturo Dauden Ibañez (Spain)

==== Group stage ====
Pos	Team	Pld	W	D	L	GF	GA	GD	Pts	Qualification
1	(Italy) Milan	6	4	0	2	12	7	+5	12	Advance to second group stage
2	(Spain) Deportivo La Coruña	6	4	0	2	11	12	−1	12	Advance to second group stage
3	(France) Lens	6	2	2	2	11	11	0	8	Transfer to UEFA Cup
4	(Germany) Bayern Munich	6	0	2	4	9	13	−4	2	

Source: RSSSF

18 September 2002 1	Milan (Italy)	2–1	(France) Lens	Milan, Italy
20:45 CEST (UTC+02:00)	Maldini (yellow card) 40'; Inzaghi 58', 61'	Report	Diop (yellow card) 53'; Moreira 75'	Stadium: San Siro; Attendance: 70,214; Referee: Kyros Vassaras (Greece)

24 September 2002 2	Deportivo La Coruña (Spain)	0–4	(Italy) Milan	A Coruña, Spain
20:45 CEST (UTC+02:00)	Silva (yellow card) 26'; Naybet (yellow card) 56'	Report	Pirlo (yellow card) 7'; Seedorf 17'; Inzaghi 32', 54', 61'	Stadium: Estadio Riazor; Attendance: 27,614; Referee: Kim Milton Nielsen (Denmark)

1 October 2002 3	Bayern Munich (Germany)	1–2	(Italy) Milan	Munich, Germany
20:45 CEST (UTC+02:00)	Ballack (yellow card) 33'; Pizarro 54'; Linke (yellow card) 80'	Report	Inzaghi 52', 84'; Nesta (yellow card) 82'	Stadium: Olympiastadion; Attendance: 60,000; Referee: Hugh Dallas (Scotland)

23 October 2002 4	Milan (Italy)	2–1	(Germany) Bayern Munich	Milan, Italy
20:45 CEST (UTC+02:00)	Serginho 11'; Ambrosini (yellow card) 43'; Seedorf (yellow card) 45+1'; Inzaghi 64'	Report	Kuffour (yellow card) 19'; Tarnat 23'; Pizarro (yellow card) 32'; Santa Cruz (yellow card) 84'	Stadium: San Siro; Attendance: 75,611; Referee: Ľuboš Micheľ (Slovakia)

29 October 2002 5	Lens (France)	2–1	(Italy) Milan	Lens, France
20:45 CET (UTC+01:00)	Moreira 41'; Utaka 49'; Coly (yellow card) 77'	Report	Shevchenko 32'; Pirlo (yellow card) 73'; Seedorf (yellow card) 75'; Tomasson (yellow card) 86'	Stadium: Stade Félix-Bollaert; Attendance: 39,474; Referee: Graham Barber (England)

13 November 2002 6	Milan (Italy)	1–2	(Spain) Deportivo La Coruña	Milan, Italy
20:45 CET (UTC+01:00)	Tomasson 34'	Report	Tristán 58'; Makaay 70'	Stadium: San Siro; Attendance: 56,000; Referee: Mike Riley (England)

==== Second group stage ====
Pos	Team	Pld	W	D	L	GF	GA	GD	Pts	Qualification
1	(Italy) Milan	6	4	0	2	5	4	+1	12	Advance to knockout stage
2	(Spain) Real Madrid	6	3	2	1	9	6	+3	11	Advance to knockout stage
3	(Germany) Borussia Dortmund	6	3	1	2	8	5	+3	10	
4	(Russia) Lokomotiv Moscow	6	0	1	5	3	10	−7	1	

Source: RSSSF

26 November 2002 1	Milan (Italy)	1–0	(Spain) Real Madrid	Milan, Italy
20:45 CET (UTC+01:00)	Shevchenko 40'; Gattuso (yellow card) 48'	Report	Pavón (yellow card) 70'; Helguera (yellow card) 85'	Stadium: San Siro; Attendance: 75,777; Referee: Urs Meier (Switzerland)

11 December 2002 2	Borussia Dortmund (Germany)	0–1	(Italy) Milan	Dortmund, Germany
20:45 CET (UTC+01:00)		Report	Inzaghi 49'	Stadium: Westfalenstadion; Attendance: 52,000; Referee: Anders Frisk (Sweden)

19 February 2003 3	Milan (Italy)	1–0	(Russia) Lokomotiv Moscow	Milan, Italy
20:45 CET (UTC+01:00)	Tomasson 62'	Report	Obradović (yellow card) 23'; Lekgetho (yellow card) 72'	Stadium: San Siro; Attendance: 72,028; Referee: Gilles Veissière (France)

25 February 2003 4	Lokomotiv Moscow (Russia)	0–1	(Italy) Milan	Moscow, Russia
18:00 CET (UTC+01:00)	Evseev (yellow card) 33'; Loskov (yellow card) 43'; Nizhegorodov (yellow card) 88'	Report	Gattuso (yellow card) 27'; Rivaldo 34' (pen.); Serginho (yellow card) 60'	Stadium: Lokomotiv Stadium; Attendance: 30,000; Referee: Kyros Vassaras (Greece)

12 March 2003 5	Real Madrid (Spain)	3–1	(Italy) Milan	Madrid, Spain
20:45 CET (UTC+01:00)	Raúl 12', 57'; Roberto Carlos (yellow card) 37'; Guti 86'	Report	Dalla Bona (yellow card) 12'; Shevchenko (yellow card) 48'; Rivaldo 81'	Stadium: Santiago Bernabéu; Attendance: 77,824; Referee: Kim Milton Nielsen (Denmark)

18 March 2003 6	Milan (Italy)	0–1	(Germany) Borussia Dortmund	Milan, Italy
20:45 CET (UTC+01:00)	Gattuso (yellow card) 15'	Report	Ewerthon (yellow card) 34'; Frings (yellow card) 59'; Koller 80'	Stadium: San Siro; Attendance: 70,577; Referee: Graham Barber (England)

==== Knockout phase ====
===== Quarter-finals =====
8 April 2003 First leg	Ajax (Netherlands)	0–0	(Italy) Milan	Amsterdam, Netherlands
20:45 CEST (UTC+02:00)		Report	Gattuso (yellow card) 35'; Ambrosini (yellow card) 67'	Stadium: Amsterdam Arena; Attendance: 50,967; Referee: Terje Hauge (Norway)

23 April 2003 Second leg	Milan (Italy)	3–2 (3–2 agg.)	(Netherlands) Ajax	Milan, Italy
20:45 CEST (UTC+02:00)	Ambrosini (yellow card) 18'; Inzaghi 30'; Costacurta (yellow card) 62'; Shevchenko 65'; Tomasson 90+1'	Report	Litmanen 63'; Pasanen (yellow card) 76'; Pienaar 78'	Stadium: San Siro; Attendance: 76,079; Referee: Manuel Mejuto González (Spain)

===== Semi-finals =====
7 May 2003 First leg	Milan (Italy)	0–0	(Italy) Internazionale	Milan, Italy
20:45 CEST (UTC+02:00)		Report		Stadium: San Siro; Attendance: 77,049; Referee: Valentin Ivanov (Russia)

13 May 2003 Second leg	Internazionale (Italy)	1–1 (1–1a agg.)	(Italy) Milan	Milan, Italy
20:45 CEST (UTC+02:00)	Di Biagio (yellow card) 39'; Martins 84'	Report	Inzaghi (yellow card) 37'; Gattuso (yellow card) 37'; Rui Costa (yellow card) 40'; Shevchenko 45+1'; Kaladze (yellow card) 85'	Stadium: San Siro; Attendance: 81,854; Referee: Gilles Veissière (France)

===== Final =====
28 May 2003 Final	Juventus (Italy)	0–0 (a.e.t.) (2–3 p)	(Italy) Milan	Manchester, England
20:45 CEST (UTC+02:00)	Tacchinardi (yellow card) 69'; Del Piero (yellow card) 111'	Report	Costacurta (yellow card) 18'	Stadium: Old Trafford; Attendance: 63,215; Referee: Markus Merk (Germany)
	Penalties
	Trezeguet (penalty missed); Birindelli (penalty scored); Zalayeta (penalty missed); Montero (penalty missed); Del Piero (penalty scored)		(penalty scored) Serginho; (penalty missed) Seedorf; (penalty missed) Kaladze; (penalty scored) Nesta; (penalty scored) Shevchenko

== Statistics ==
=== Players statistics ===
No.	Pos	Nat	Player	Total		Serie A		Coppa		Champions League	
No.	Pos	Nat	Player	Apps	Goals	Apps	Goals	Apps	Goals	Apps	Goals
12	GK	(Brazil) BRA	Dida	44	-30	30	-23	0	0	13+1	-7
14	DF	(Croatia) CRO	Simic	45	1	29	1	3	0	12+1	0
13	DF	(Italy) ITA	Nesta	48	2	29	1	5	1	13+1	0
3	DF	(Italy) ITA	Maldini	49	2	28+1	2	1	0	19	0
4	DF	(Georgia (country)) GEO	Kaladze	46	1	25+2	0	4	1	14+1	0
8	MF	(Italy) ITA	Gattuso	42	0	23+2	0	3	0	13+1	0
21	MF	(Italy) ITA	Pirlo	42	9	21+6	9	2	0	11+2	0
20	MF	(Netherlands) NED	Seedorf	48	7	24+5	4	3	2	13+3	1
10	MF	(Portugal) POR	Rui Costa	48	1	24+1	0	5	1	16+2	0
9	FW	(Italy) ITA	Inzaghi	49	30	27+3	17	3	1	14+2	12
7	FW	(Ukraine) UKR	Shevchenko	39	10	18+6	5	4	1	11	4
18	GK	(Italy) ITA	Abbiati	17	-20	3	-3	8	-8	6	-9
23	MF	(Italy) ITA	Ambrosini	36	2	17+4	1	3	1	7+5	0
11	FW	(Brazil) BRA	Rivaldo	38	8	16+6	5	3	1	8+5	2
19	DF	(Italy) ITA	Costacurta	34	0	13+5	0	5	0	10+1	0
27	MF	(Brazil) BRA	Serginho	37	4	11+10	3	2	0	5+9	1
15	FW	(Denmark) DEN	Tomasson	37	11	7+12	4	7	4	5+6	3
32	MF	(Italy) ITA	Brocchi	27	2	6+6	2	8	0	5+2	0
5	MF	(Argentina) ARG	Redondo	19	0	6+2	0	6	0	3+2	0
25	DF	(Brazil) BRA	Roque Junior	7	0	4	0	1	0	1+1	0
24	DF	(Denmark) DEN	Laursen	26	0	3+7	0	7	0	4+5	0
2	DF	(Denmark) DEN	Helveg	17	0	2+6	0	7	0	2	0
28	MF	(Italy) ITA	Dalla Bona	16	1	1+3	0	6	1	3+3	0
31	MF	(France) FRA	Ba	5	0	1+2	0	2	0	0	0
16	DF	(Argentina) ARG	Chamot	4	0	1+1	0	1	0	0+1	0
1	GK	(Italy) ITA	Fiori	1	-4	1	-4	0	0	0	0
33	MF	(Brazil) BRA	Leonardo	5	2	0+1	0	4	2	0	0
30	FW	(Italy) ITA	Borriello	6	1	0+3	0	2	1	0+1	0
83	FW	(Gabon) GAB	Aubameyang	1	0	0	0	0	0	0+1	0
39	FW	(Italy) ITA	Piccolo	1	0	1	0	0	0	0	0
37	FW	(Italy) ITA	Bortolotto	1	0	0+1	0	0	0	0	0
41	DF	(Italy) ITA	Dal Bello	1	0	0+1	0	0	0	0	0
34	FW	(Italy) ITA	Matri	1	0	1	0	0	0	0	0
36	MF	(Italy) ITA	Pastrello	1	0	0+1	0	0	0	0	0
42	DF	(Italy) ITA	Stefani	1	0	1	0	0	0	0	0
43	DF	(Italy) ITA	Venditti	0	0	0	0	0	0	0	0
22	DF	(Romania) ROU	Contra	0	0	0	0	0	0	0	0
17	DF	(Brazil) BRA	Claiton	0	0	0	0	0	0	0	0

- Source: http://calcio-seriea.net/presenze/2002/1220/
