= Middlesbrough Trophy =

- Founded: 1998
- Region: Europe
- Teams: 4
- Current champions: (Portugal) Benfica (1st title)
- Most championships: (Portugal) Benfica (1 title)

The Middlesbrough Trophy (or JD Sports Cup for sponsorship reasons) was an invitational football tournament held at the Riverside, Middlesbrough. The only edition took place between 1 and 2 August 1998. It was contested by four teams.

== Tournament ==
=== Bracket ===
Semi-finals
1 August – Middlesbrough (Riverside)
(England) Newcastle United	0
(Portugal) Benfica	0
1 August – Middlesbrough (Riverside)
(England) Middlesbrough	0
(Italy) Empoli	1

Final
2 August – Middlesbrough (Riverside)
(Portugal) Benfica	1
(Italy) Empoli	1
Third place
2 August – Middlesbrough (Riverside)
(England) Newcastle United	1
(England) Middlesbrough	1

Benfica beat Newcastle United 4–3 on penalties.
Newcastle United beat Middlesbrough 4–3 on penalties.
Benfica beat Empoli 7–6 on penalties.

=== Results ===
1 August 1998 Semi Final	Newcastle United	0 – 0 (3–4 p)	Benfica	Riverside Stadium
				Attendance: 5,430
	Penalties
	Watson (penalty scored); Pearce (penalty scored); Ketsbaia (penalty scored)		Paulo Madeira (penalty scored); Scott Minto (penalty missed); Nandinho (penalty scored); Kandaurov (penalty scored); Luís Carlos (penalty scored)

1 August 1998 Semi Final	Middlesbrough	0 – 1	Empoli	Riverside Stadium
			Artico 80'

2 August 1998 3rd/4th Place	Middlesbrough	1 – 1 (3–4 p)	Newcastle United	Riverside Stadium
	Mustoe 27'		Shearer 50' (pen.)	Attendance: 5,230
	Penalties
	Penalty scored		Shearer (penalty scored); Lee (penalty scored); Albert (penalty scored); Pistone (penalty scored)

2 August 1998 Final	Benfica	1 – 1 (7–6 p)	Empoli	Riverside Stadium
	Gomes 49' (pen.)		Palumbo 57'
