= 1995–96 Anglo-Italian Cup =

Football competition

The 1995–96 Anglo-Italian Cup was the last Anglo-Italian Cup competition. The European football competition was played between eight clubs from England and eight clubs from Italy. Italian side Genoa lifted the trophy after beating English side Port Vale 5–2.

== Format ==
For the competition there were eight English teams and eight Italian teams. These teams were split into two groups consisting of four English and four Italian teams each. Each team played against the four teams in their group from the opposing nation. In each group, the best team from each nation progressed to the regional semi-finals. The semi-finals were two-leg matches played between each nation's group winners. The winner of each semi-final then met in a final.

== Group stage ==
Group	England	Italy
A	Birmingham City; Luton Town; Oldham Athletic; Port Vale	Ancona; Cesena; Genoa; Perugia
B	Ipswich Town; Southend United; Stoke City; West Bromwich Albion	Brescia; Foggia; Reggiana; Salernitana

=== Group A games ===
5 September 1995

Ancona	1–0	Oldham Athletic

5 September 1995

Birmingham City	2–3	Genoa

5 September 1995

Cesena	2–2	Port Vale

5 September 1995

Luton Town	1–4	Perugia

11 October 1995

Genoa	4–0	Luton Town

11 October 1995

Oldham Athletic	0–0	Cesena

11 October 1995

Perugia	0–1	Birmingham City

11 October 1995

Port Vale	2–0	Ancona

8 November 1995

Ancona	1–2	Birmingham City

8 November 1995

Cesena	2–1	Luton Town

8 November 1995

Oldham Athletic	2–0	Perugia

8 November 1995

Port Vale	0–0	Genoa

13 December 1995

Birmingham City	3–1	Cesena

13 December 1995

Genoa	0–0	Oldham Athletic

13 December 1995

Luton Town	5–0	Ancona

13 December 1995

Perugia	3–5	Port Vale

==== Group A tables ====
English teams

Team	Pld	W	D	L	GF	GA	Pts
Birmingham City	4	3	0	1	8	5	9
Port Vale	4	2	2	0	9	5	6
Oldham Athletic	4	1	2	1	2	1	5
Luton Town	4	1	0	3	7	10	3

Italian teams

Team	Pld	W	D	L	GF	GA	Pts
Genoa	4	2	2	0	7	2	8
Cesena	4	1	2	1	5	6	5
Perugia	4	1	0	3	7	9	3
Ancona	4	1	0	3	2	9	3

=== Group B games ===
5 September 1995

Foggia	1–1	Stoke City

5 September 1995

Salernitana	0–0	West Bromwich Albion

5 September 1995

Ipswich Town	2–1	Reggiana

5 September 1995

Southend United	0–0	Brescia

11 October 1995

Brescia	2–2	Ipswich Town

11 October 1995

Reggiana	1–1	Southend United

11 October 1995

Stoke City	2–2	Salernitana

11 October 1995

West Bromwich Albion	1–1	Foggia

8 November 1995

Foggia	0–1	Ipswich Town

8 November 1995

Salernitana	2–1	Southend United

8 November 1995

Stoke City	1–1	Brescia

8 November 1995

West Bromwich Albion	2–1	Reggiana

13 December 1995

Brescia	0–1	West Bromwich Albion

13 December 1995

Ipswich Town	2–0	Salernitana

13 December 1995

Reggiana	0–0	Stoke City

13 December 1995

Southend United	1–2	Foggia

==== Group B tables ====
English teams

Team	Pld	W	D	L	GF	GA	Pts
Ipswich Town	4	3	1	0	7	3	10
West Bromwich Albion	4	2	2	0	4	2	8
Stoke City	4	0	4	0	4	4	4
Southend United	4	0	2	2	3	5	2

Italian teams

Team	Pld	W	D	L	GF	GA	Pts
Foggia	4	1	2	1	4	4	5
Salernitana	4	1	2	1	4	5	5
Brescia	4	0	3	1	3	4	3
Reggiana	4	0	2	2	3	5	2

== Regional Semi-finals ==
English semi-final

23 January 1996

Ipswich Town	2–4	Port Vale

30 January 1996

West Bromwich Albion	(4) 2–2 (1)	Birmingham City

Italian semi-final

10 January 1996

Foggia	1–2	Cesena

17 January 1996

Genoa	(6) 0–0 (5)	Salernitana

== Regional Finals ==
English final

24 February 1996

West Bromwich Albion	0–0	Port Vale

5 March 1996

West Bromwich Albion	1–3	Port Vale

Italian final

31 January 1996

Cesena	0–4	Genoa

8 February 1996

Genoa	1–0	Cesena

== Tournament Final ==
17 March 1996

Genoa (Italy)	5–2	Port Vale (England)
Ruotolo 12', 54', 66'; Galante 21'; Montella 39'	Report	Foyle 68', 82'

Wembley Stadium

Genoa:
GK	1	(Italy) Luca Pastine	(substituted off) 75'
DF	2	(Italy) Davide Nicola	(substituted off) 50'
DF	5	(Italy) Fabio Galante
DF	6	(Italy) Luca Cavallo
DF	3	(Italy) Daniele Delli Carri
MF	4	(Italy) Oscar Magoni
MF	7	(Italy) Gennaro Ruotolo
MF	8	(Italy) Mario Bortolazzi
MF	11	(Italy) Roberto Onorati	(substituted off) 46'
FW	9	(Italy) Vincenzo Montella
FW	10	(Italy) Marco Nappi
Substitutes:
GK	12	(Italy) Gianpaolo Spagnulo	(substituted on) 75'
MF	14	(Netherlands) John van 't Schip	(substituted on) 50'
MF	13	(Italy) Vincenzo Torrente	(substituted on) 46'
Manager:
(Italy) Gaetano Salvemini

Port Vale
GK	(England) Paul Musselwhite
DF	(England) Andy Hill
DF	(England) Gareth Griffiths
DF	(England) Neil Aspin
DF	(England) Dean Stokes	(substituted off) 37'
MF	(Northern Ireland) Jon McCarthy
MF	(England) Andy Porter
MF	(England) Ian Bogie
MF	(England) Steve Guppy	(substituted off) 86'
FW	(England) Martin Foyle
FW	(Scotland) Lee Glover	(substituted off) 59'
Substitutes:
MF	(England) Ray Walker	(substituted on) 37'
MF	(England) Stewart Talbot	(substituted on) 86'
FW	(England) Tony Naylor	(substituted on) 59'
Manager:
(England) John Rudge
