= Christian Abbiati =

Italian footballer (born 1977)

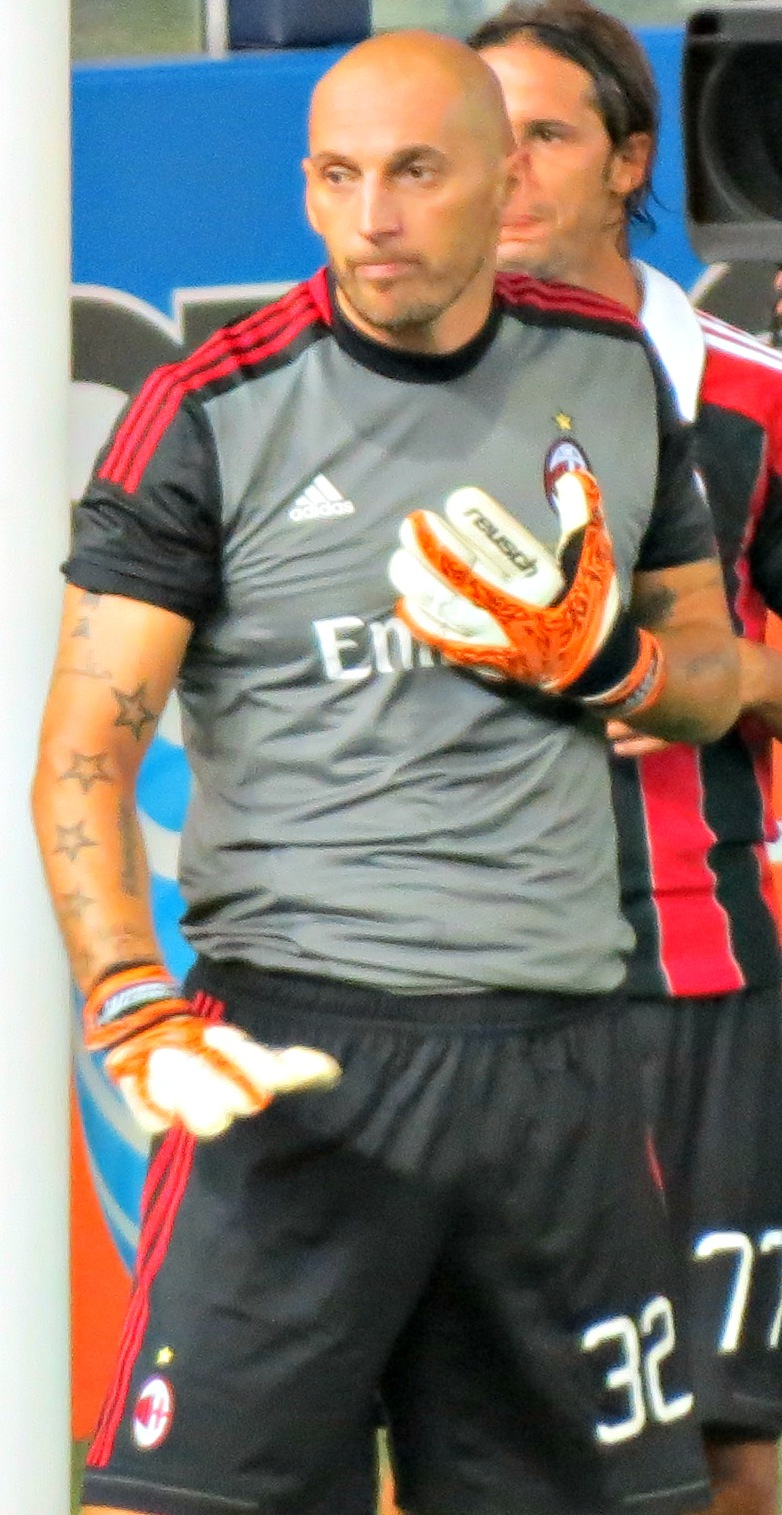
- Abbiati playing for AC Milan in 2012

Personal information
- Full name: Christian Abbiati
- Date of birth: 8 July 1977 (age 49)
- Place of birth: Abbiategrasso, Italy
- Height: 1.93 m (6 ft 4 in)
- Position: Goalkeeper

Youth career
- 1991–1992: Trezzano
- 1992–1993: Assago
- 1993–1994: Corsico

Senior career*
| Years | Team | Apps | (Gls) |
| 1994–1998 | Monza | 52 | (0) |
| 1995–1996 | → Borgosesia (loan) | 29 | (0) |
| 1998–2016 | AC Milan | 281 | (0) |
| 2005–2006 | → Juventus (loan) | 19 | (0) |
| 2006–2007 | → Torino (loan) | 36 | (0) |
| 2007–2008 | → Atlético Madrid (loan) | 21 | (0) |
| Total | | 438 | (0) |

International career
| 1998–2000 | Italy U21 | 20 | (0) |
| 2000–2005 | Italy | 4 | (0) |
Medal record
Men's football
Representing Italy
UEFA European Championship
| Runner-up | 2000 Belgium-Netherlands | Team |
- * Club domestic league appearances and goals

Christian Abbiati Cavaliere OMRI (born 8 July 1977) is an Italian former professional footballer who played as a goalkeeper.

Abbiati, who had been with AC Milan since 1998, started his career with Monza, and later played more than 300 official matches for Milan. He also spent loan spells at Borgosesia Calcio, Juventus, Torino and Atlético Madrid. His honours include three Serie A titles, one Coppa Italia, two Supercoppa Italiana victories, one UEFA Champions League and one UEFA Super Cup.

Although he was selected by Italy at UEFA Euro 2000 (where the team reached the final), and the 2002 FIFA World Cup, he did not represent the nation until he made his international debut in a 2–1 friendly win against Switzerland in 2003. In total, he was capped four times by the national team.

Abbiati currently holds the record for the most appearances as a goalkeeper for Milan (380). In his prime, Abbiati was regarded as one of the best goalkeepers in Italy.

== Club career ==
=== AC Milan ===
Abbiati's Serie A debut came on 17 January 1999 as a 92nd-minute substitute for Sebastiano Rossi. Abbiati picked up a league title with AC Milan that season despite initially being third-choice goalkeeper behind Rossi and Jens Lehmann, while also facing competition from reserve keeper Giorgio Frezzolini. Due to his performances, Abbiati eventually broke into the starting line-up, and in the final match of the season on 23 May, he made several decisive saves, including one on Cristian Bucchi, as Milan celebrated winning the Scudetto following a 2–1 away win over Perugia. He then became Milan's undisputed first choice goalkeeper for the next four years, until he lost his starting spot to backup Dida early in the 2002–03 season after incurring an injury during a UEFA Champions League qualifying match in August 2002. Dida's top form effectively grounded Abbiati's playing time to a halt.

Despite his relegation to the bench, Abbiati still managed to contribute to Milan's Coppa Italia and Champions League victories that season. He appeared in Milan's 2003 Supercoppa Italiana defeat to Juventus on penalties, but Dida later regained his position as starting goalkeeper. Abbiati played one minute in Milan's 2004–05 Champions League campaign, when he came on as a substitute in the 74th minute after Dida had been struck by a flare thrown from the crowd during the quarter-final second leg against cross-city rivals Inter Milan on 12 April 2005. The match was ultimately suspended less than a minute later. His last match in a Milan kit came on 20 May in a 3–3 home draw with Palermo, a match which saw the starters rested for the upcoming Champions League final, which Milan lost to Liverpool after squandering a 3–0 half-time lead. Milan finished second in Serie A that season.

=== Loan spells ===
Abbiati announced his desire to move to another club in order to contend for a starting spot and was therefore loaned to Genoa for the 2005–06 season in July 2005, but he immediately returned to Milan after Genoa were relegated to Serie C1 due to a match-fixing scandal.

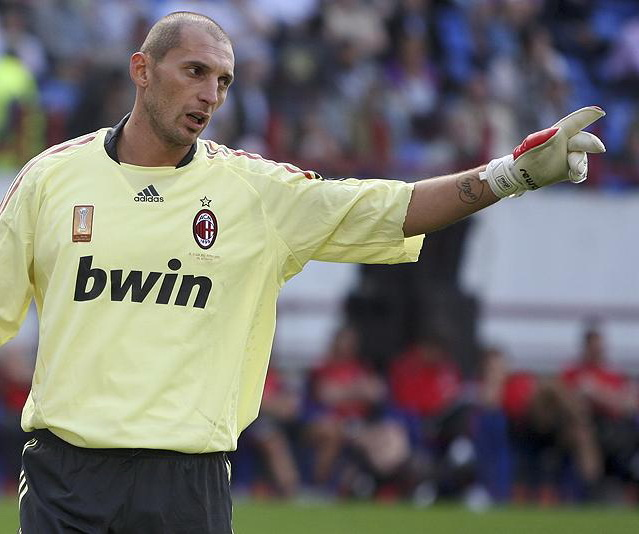
Abbiati in 2008

==== Juventus and Torino ====
Abbiati was soon on the move again, joining Juventus as a temporary replacement for incumbent Gianluigi Buffon, who had suffered a dislocated shoulder during the Luigi Berlusconi Trophy match against Milan in August 2005. With long-awaited regular playing time at his disposal, he flourished with the Bianconeri, but when Buffon returned to the starting lineup six months later, Abbiati's services were no longer needed, and he left at the end of the season for another Turin squad when Milan loaned him to Torino in July 2006. Although Juventus managed to win the Serie A title that season, it was later revoked due to their involvement in the Calciopoli scandal, and they were relegated to Serie B the following season.

==== Atlético Madrid ====
Despite expressing his desire to stay for another season, Abbiati and Torino ultimately parted ways due to a salary dispute. He was once again loaned out by Milan for the third time in three seasons, this time to Spanish club Atlético Madrid until June 2008. He began the season on the bench until an injury to incumbent Leo Franco put him in the starting lineup. On 29 December, he expressed interest in staying with Atlético beyond 2007–08 season, saying, "My adaptation has gone better than I expected. I am happy at this club because they have helped me so much. I like playing in Spain and I think I will learn a lot during the time that I have left here."

=== Return to AC Milan ===
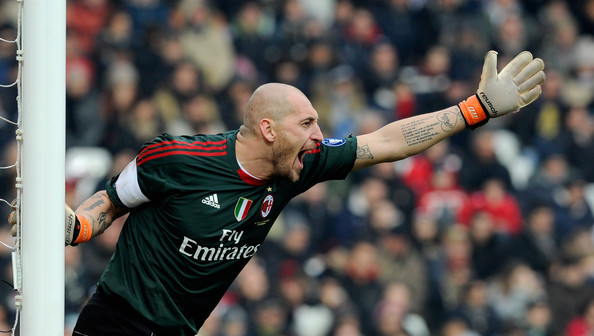
Abbiati with AC Milan in 2012

Abbiati returned to Italy after being called back by Milan for the 2008–09 season and took over as first choice from Zeljko Kalac after a solid pre-season. However, on 15 March 2009, his season was cut short following a severe knee injury in the first half of Milan's 5–1 league win over Siena, after he suffered ligament damage to his right knee from a collision with teammate Giuseppe Favalli. He was ruled out of action for six months following rehabilitation and knee surgery. In 28 appearances, he kept 11 clean sheets and conceded 27 goals. On 8 November, nearly eight months after the injury, Abbiati was called up as Milan's third-choice behind Dida and new acquisition Flavio Roma for Milan's 2–1 away win over Lazio.

In 2010–11, Abbiati returned as starting goalkeeper for Milan after Dida's departure. He added two more year to his contract in July 2010, to last until 30 June 2013. He made some crucial saves in the first half of the season and was one of the primary reasons to Milan holding a top spot by January 2011. On 7 May 2011, after a series of good performances in crucial matches in the second half of the season, Milan clinched their first Serie A trophy in seven years. Abbiati followed up this victory by winning the Supercoppa Italiana over Inter Milan, although they were unable to defend the Scudetto, finishing second to champions Juventus.

On 20 May 2013 Abbiati signed a new one-year contract. In September 2013, he broke Sebastiano Rossi's record for the most appearances as a goalkeeper for Milan. His contract was renewed again on 21 May 2014. In the 2014–15 Serie A season, he was named Milan's second-choice goalkeeper following the arrival of former Real Madrid goalkeeper Diego López. He received a new one-year contract extension on 1 July 2015.

During the 2015–16 Serie A season, Abbiati became Milan's third-choice goalkeeper behind 16-year-old Gianluigi Donnarumma. He made five appearances in the Coppa Italia, as he helped Milan to reach the final of the tournament, but was benched in favour of Donnarumma in Milan's 1–0 loss to Juventus in the final. Although it was initially unknown whether Abbiati would return for the 2016–17 season, he officially announced on 13 May that he would be retiring at the end of the season. Despite Milan announcing that Abbiati would make his final appearance in the season finale against Roma on 14 May, Abbiati instead opted to let Donnarumma start due to the importance of the match. In total, Abbiati managed 281 league appearances during his 15 years with the club.

== International career ==
Abbiati received his first senior international call-up for Italy from manager Dino Zoff, being named as the third-choice goalkeeper for UEFA Euro 2000 behind Francesco Toldo and Francesco Antonioli, after Gianluigi Buffon withdrew from the squad through injury; he did not play, however, with Toldo starting in goal, as Italy reached the final, losing 2–1 to France on a golden goal. Later that year, he was part of the squad that participated in the 2000 Summer Olympics, where Italy were eliminated in the quarter-finals, following a 1–0 defeat to Spain. While still uncapped, Abbiati was once again named by manager Giovanni Trapattoni as Italy's third-choice goalkeeper for the 2002 FIFA World Cup; however, he once again did not appear, with Buffon starting ahead of him, as Italy were eliminated 2–1 in the round of 16 by co-hosts South Korea following a golden goal. He did not earn his first cap until a 2–1 friendly victory over Switzerland in Geneva, on 30 April 2003, where he was replaced late in the second half by fellow debutant Ivan Pelizzoli. He was left off of Trapattoni's Italy team for Euro 2004, with Buffon, Toldo, and Angelo Peruzzi being called up; Italy suffered a group-stage elimination, following a three-way five-point tie with Denmark and Sweden.

Abbiati's final cap came under manager Marcello Lippi, in a 1–1 friendly draw against Ivory Coast in Geneva. He was later left off the 2006 FIFA World Cup roster by Lippi, with Buffon, Peruzzi, and Marco Amelia being called up as Italy's goalkeepers; Italy went on to win the title, defeating France 5–4 on penalties in final following a 1–1 draw. He was later recalled to the national team in September 2006 by manager Roberto Donadoni for Italy's upcoming Euro 2008 qualifying matches. He received his final call-up for Italy in June 2007. In March 2009, three days before his season-ending knee injury, he said that he would refuse a future call-up for Italy in a non-starting role. In total, he made four appearances for Italy between 2003 and 2005, all of which came in friendlies, conceding three goals.

== After retirement ==
In June 2017, it was announced in a statement published on Milan's official website that Abbiati would be joining the club once again as a club manager, acting as a liaison between the team and the club.

== Style of play ==
In his prime, Abbiati was a physically strong, reliable and reactive keeper. Throughout his career, he stood out for his longevity, work-rate, leadership and composure in goal, as well as his ability to inspire a sense of calmness to his defenders. He was also effective at rushing off of his line or coming out to claim crosses, despite initially being somewhat indecisive in this area in his youth. Although his performances became more inconsistent during the later years of his career, as his reflexes and movement slowed down, he was initially regarded as one of the most talented young Italian goalkeepers of his generation since his emergence with Milan in Serie A during the late 1990s. He subsequently cemented himself as one of the best Italian goalkeepers of his generation, as well as one of the best shot-stoppers in Serie A in his prime.

== Political views ==
In September 2008, Abbiati sparked controversy and criticism from the Italian media when he declared he was a fascist during an interview with Italian sports magazine Sportweek. He later stated he rejected the fascist racial laws and aggressive foreign policies, but declared he was "not ashamed to proclaim" his far-right ideology. "I share [the] ideals of fascism, such as the fatherland and the values of the Catholic religion."

== Personal life ==
Abbiati is married to an Italian woman, Stefania Abbiati. Their daughter, Giulia, was born on 30 January 2000.

== Career statistics ==
=== Club ===
Appearances and goals by club, season and competition
| Club | Season | League | | | Coppa Italia | | Continental | | Other | | Total | |
| Club | Season | Division | Apps | Goals | Apps | Goals | Apps | Goals | Apps | Goals | Apps | Goals |
|---|---|---|---|---|---|---|---|---|---|---|---|---|
| Monza | 1994–95 | Serie C1 | 1 | 0 | 0 | 0 | — | | — | | 1 | 0 |
| Monza | 1996–97 | Serie C1 | 25 | 0 | 0 | 0 | — | | — | | 25 | 0 |
| Monza | 1997–98 | Serie B | 26 | 0 | 2 | 0 | — | | — | | 28 | 0 |
| Monza | Total | | 52 | 0 | 2 | 0 | — | | — | | 54 | 0 |
| Borgosesia (loan) | 1995–96 | C.N.D. | 29 | 0 | 0 | 0 | — | | — | | 29 | 0 |
| AC Milan | 1998–99 | Serie A | 18 | 0 | 0 | 0 | 0 | 0 | — | | 18 | 0 |
| AC Milan | 1999–2000 | Serie A | 29 | 0 | 0 | 0 | 6 (Note: Appearances in UEFA Champions League) | 0 | 0 | 0 | 35 | 0 |
| AC Milan | 2000–01 | Serie A | 21 | 0 | 4 | 0 | 7 | 0 | — | | 32 | 0 |
| AC Milan | 2001–02 | Serie A | 34 | 0 | 1 | 0 | 11 (Note: Appearances in UEFA Cup) | 0 | — | | 46 | 0 |
| AC Milan | 2002–03 | Serie A | 3 | 0 | 8 | 0 | 6 | 0 | 0 | 0 | 17 | 0 |
| AC Milan | 2003–04 | Serie A | 2 | 0 | 4 | 0 | 1 | 0 | 1 (Note: Appearance in Supercoppa Italiana) | 0 | 8 | 0 |
| AC Milan | 2004–05 | Serie A | 3 | 0 | 4 | 0 | 1 | 0 | — | | 8 | 0 |
| AC Milan | 2008–09 | Serie A | 28 | 0 | 0 | 0 | 0 | 0 | — | | 28 | 0 |
| AC Milan | 2009–10 | Serie A | 9 | 0 | 1 | 0 | 1 | 0 | — | | 11 | 0 |
| AC Milan | 2010–11 | Serie A | 35 | 0 | 1 | 0 | 6 | 0 | — | | 42 | 0 |
| AC Milan | 2011–12 | Serie A | 31 | 0 | 0 | 0 | 9 | 0 | 1 | 0 | 41 | 0 |
| AC Milan | 2012–13 | Serie A | 28 | 0 | 1 | 0 | 7 | 0 | — | | 36 | 0 |
| AC Milan | 2013–14 | Serie A | 28 | 0 | 2 | 0 | 9 | 0 | — | | 39 | 0 |
| AC Milan | 2014–15 | Serie A | 11 | 0 | 2 | 0 | — | | — | | 13 | 0 |
| AC Milan | 2015–16 | Serie A | 1 | 0 | 5 | 0 | — | | — | | 6 | 0 |
| AC Milan | Total | | 281 | 0 | 33 | 0 | 64 | 0 | 2 | 0 | 380 | 0 |
| Juventus (loan) | 2005–06 | Serie A | 19 | 0 | 2 | 0 | 6 | 0 | — | | 27 | 0 |
| Torino (loan) | 2006–07 | Serie A | 36 | 0 | 2 | 0 | — | | — | | 38 | 0 |
| Atlético Madrid (loan) | 2007–08 | La Liga | 21 | 0 | 0 | 0 | 9 | 0 | — | | 30 | 0 |
| Career total | | | 438 | 0 | 41 | 0 | 79 | 0 | 2 | 0 | 560 | 0 |

=== International ===
Appearances and goals by national team and year
| National team | Year | Apps | Goals |
|---|---|---|---|
| Italy | 2003 | 2 | 0 |
| Italy | 2005 | 2 | 0 |
| Total | | 4 | 0 |

== Honours ==
AC Milan

- Serie A: 1998–99, 2003–04, 2010–11
- Coppa Italia: 2002–03
- Supercoppa Italiana: 2004, 2011
- UEFA Champions League: 2002–03
- UEFA Super Cup: 2003
- Intercontinental Cup runner-up: 2003

Italy

- UEFA European Championship runner-up: 2000

Individual

- AC Milan Hall of Fame

Orders

5th Class / Knight: Cavaliere Ordine al Merito della Repubblica Italiana: 2000
