= Fernando Redondo =

Argentine footballer (born 1969)

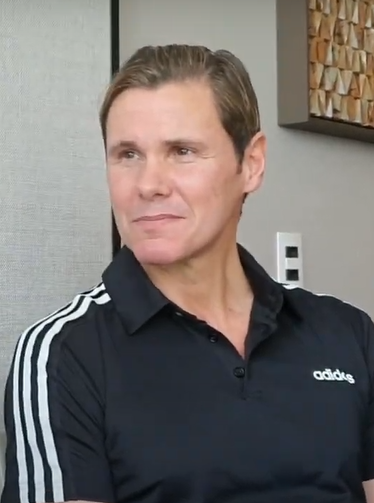
- Redondo in 2019

Personal information
- Full name: Fernando Carlos Redondo Neri
- Date of birth: 6 June 1969 (age 57)
- Place of birth: Adrogué, Argentina
- Height: 1.86 m (6 ft 1 in)
- Position: Defensive midfielder

Youth career
- Talleres
- 1979–1985: Argentinos Juniors

Senior career*
Years	Team	Apps	(Gls)
1985–1990	Argentinos Juniors	65	(1)
1990–1994	Tenerife	103	(8)
1994–2000	Real Madrid	165	(4)
2000–2004	AC Milan	16	(0)
Total		349	(13)

International career
1992–1999	Argentina	29	(1)
Medal record
Men's football
Representing Argentina
Copa América
Winner	1993 Ecuador
FIFA Confederations Cup
Winner	1992 Saudi Arabia
South American U-17 Championship
Winner	1985 Argentina
- * Club domestic league appearances and goals

Fernando Carlos Redondo Neri (Spanish pronunciation: [feɾˈnando reˈðondo]; born 6 June 1969) is an Argentine former professional footballer who played as a defensive midfielder. He most notably played for Real Madrid and AC Milan. He is widely regarded as one of the greatest defensive midfielders of all time.

A defensive midfielder with the ability to contribute offensively and creatively, he turned professional playing for Argentinos Juniors and played one full decade in La Liga, for Tenerife and Real Madrid, then finished his career (curtailed by several injury problems) in Italy, with AC Milan. With Real Madrid, he won two La Liga championships and as many Champions League trophies, adding the 2003 Champions League with Milan.

Redondo was a member of the Argentina national team in the 1990s, representing the nation in the 1994 World Cup, and also winning the 1992 FIFA Confederations Cup and the 1993 Copa América.

== Club career ==
=== Early years / Tenerife ===
Born in Adrogué, Buenos Aires Province, Redondo played his first game in the Primera División at only 16 for Argentinos Juniors, and remained five years with the team before moving abroad to Spain.

Redondo made his debut in La Liga with Tenerife, under the management of countryman Jorge Solari. During this period, Real Madrid twice lost the league title to arch-rivals Barcelona on the final day of the season, in matches against Tenerife who were managed by Jorge Valdano and, when the coach was appointed at Real Madrid in the summer of 1994, the player also made the move for a fee of US$5 million.

=== Real Madrid ===
The key years of Redondo's career were spent at Real Madrid, where he won two league championships and the UEFA Champions League in 1998 and 2000. During the second victorious campaign in the latter competition, his performances won him the competition's Most Valuable Player award, with new coach Vicente del Bosque utilising him in a midfield combination with Steve McManaman. In the quarter-finals against Manchester United at Old Trafford, he was the author of a spectacular play in which he dribbled past Henning Berg by backheeling the ball around him, recovering it and assisting Raúl for his side's third goal (3–2 win, 3–2 on aggregate); after the game, opposing manager Alex Ferguson said: "What does this player have in his boots? A magnet?” For his performances, he was subsequently voted the Champions League and UEFA Club Footballer of the Year.

During his time in Madrid, Redondo earned the nickname El Principe ("The Prince"). In April 2013, he was named by daily newspaper Marca as a member of the "Best foreign eleven in Real Madrid's history" and, four years later, was selected by its readers to be part of the club's all-time XI; during one full decade, he amassed Spanish top division totals of 268 games and 12 goals.

=== AC Milan ===
In 2000, Redondo transferred to Serie A club A.C. Milan in a controversial £11m move: he stated that he was not involved in transfer discussions and expressed his desire to stay at Madrid. In response, a section of Real Madrid supporters gathered outside the Santiago Bernabéu protesting the transfer. However, he suffered a serious knee injury in one of his first training sessions for his new team, and was unable to play for the next 2 1/2 years; he suspended his £2.74m-a-year salary, and even tried to give back the house and car which the Milan board had given him.

Redondo did manage to contribute (albeit in a peripheral role) to Milan's successes in the 2002–03 and 2003–04 seasons, making a combined 16 league appearances and adding five in the 2002–03 Champions League and six in the same edition of the Coppa Italia, including the two-legged final. In late 2004, at the age of 35, he retired from professional football following another knee injury.

== International career ==
Redondo earned 29 caps for Argentina, the bulk of his appearances coming from 1992 to 1994 while Alfio Basile was the manager. His first appearance was on 18 June 1992, in a 2–0 friendly win over Australia.

Redondo turned down a call-up to the national team just before the 1990 FIFA World Cup, when it was coached by Carlos Salvador Bilardo. The player excused himself on account of not wanting to interrupt his law studies, but it was also reported that he objected to Bilardo's defensive strategy. Redondo later explained: "I was picked for Argentina's World Cup squad in 1990 but I knew I wasn't going to be in the starting line-up, I would just be another squad member, so I preferred to stay home."

In the 1994 World Cup, Redondo started in all of Argentina's matches, but was unable to prevent the country from falling 2–3 to Romania in the round of 16. Following the tournament in the United States, he refused to play under Daniel Passarella, who had banned long hair, earrings and homosexuals in his squad, leading to disputes with several players. The former refused the latter's demand to cut his hair, and was left out of the national team as even Diego Maradona and president Carlos Menem went on to take sides in the situation.

Passarella excluded Redondo from his 1998 World Cup squad, stating: "Twice he was asked to play for the national team and twice he refused and gave a different reason each time. Then he announced publicly he did not want to play for the national team and I do not pick any player who does not want to play for Argentina." The player later explained: "I was in great form. But he had particular ideas about discipline and wanted me to have my hair cut. I didn't see what that had to do with playing football so I said no again."

In 1999, when Argentina was managed by Marcelo Bielsa, Redondo was recalled to the national side for two exhibition matches with Brazil. Although he was chosen Player of the match in the 2–0 victory in Buenos Aires he refused any subsequent call-ups, preferring to focus on club football; in 2015, he was included in an all-time team by the Argentine Football Association.

== Style of play ==
An elegant deep-lying playmaker who played in front of the defence, Redondo's main attributes were his creative passing, vision, technique and close control with his left foot, his ability to control the tempo of his team's play in midfield making him a key member of the Real Madrid side of the 90s. Despite not having a great deal of pace, he possessed good acceleration and was an efficient and aggressive tackler, who contributed defensively just as much as he did offensively. As such, his role has also been likened to that of a metodista ("centre-half," in Italian football jargon), due to his ability to dictate play in midfield as well as assist his team defensively. Fabio Capello described Redondo as "tactically perfect".

Although he was regarded as one of the greatest midfielders of his generation, Redondo's career was also largely marked by injuries, in particular during the final years of his career.

== Personal life ==
Redondo was born into an industrialist family and enjoyed a wealthy upbringing, later studying law at university in the early years of his playing career. He married the cousin of fellow footballer Santiago Solari, and his sons Federico and Fernando Jr. were also involved in the sport.

An avid reader, Redondo counted Jorge Luis Borges and Gabriel García Márquez as his two favourite authors.

== Career statistics ==
=== Club ===
Appearances and goals by club, season and competition
Club	Season	League			Cup (Note: Includes Copa del Rey and Coppa Italia)		Continental		Other		Total	
Club	Season	Division	Apps	Goals	Apps	Goals	Apps	Goals	Apps	Goals	Apps	Goals
Argentinos Juniors	1985–86	Argentine Primera División	1	0	0	0	0	0	—		1	0
Argentinos Juniors	1986–87	Argentine Primera División	0	0	0	0	0	0	0	0	0	0
Argentinos Juniors	1987–88	Argentine Primera División	14	0	0	0	—		—		14	0
Argentinos Juniors	1988–89	Argentine Primera División	36	0	0	0	0	0	0	0	36	0
Argentinos Juniors	1989–90	Argentine Primera División	14	1	0	0	0	0	0	0	14	1
Argentinos Juniors	Total		65	1	0	0	0	0	0	0	65	1
Tenerife	1990–91	La Liga	23	1	0	0	0	0	0	0	23	1
Tenerife	1991–92	La Liga	32	2	0	0	0	0	0	0	32	2
Tenerife	1992–93	La Liga	20	4	0	0	0	0	0	0	20	4
Tenerife	1993–94	La Liga	28	1	0	0	4 (Note: Appearances in UEFA Cup)	0	0	0	32	1
Tenerife	Total		103	8	0	0	4	0	0	0	107	8
Real Madrid	1994–95	La Liga	23	1	0	0	3	1	0	0	26	2
Real Madrid	1995–96	La Liga	23	2	2	0	4 (Note: Appearances in UEFA Champions League)	0	1 (Note: Appearance in Supercopa de España)	0	30	2
Real Madrid	1996–97	La Liga	33	1	6	0	0	0	0	0	39	1
Real Madrid	1997–98	La Liga	33	0	2	0	11	0	0	0	46	0
Real Madrid	1998–99	La Liga	23	0	2	0	7	0	2 (Note: One appearance each in UEFA Super Cup and Intercontinental Cup)	0	34	0
Real Madrid	1999–2000	La Liga	30	0	5	0	15	0	3 (Note: Appearances in FIFA Club World Championship)	0	53	0
Real Madrid	Total		165	4	17	0	37	1	6	0	225	5
A.C. Milan	2000–01	Serie A	0	0	0	0	0	0	0	0	0	0
A.C. Milan	2001–02	Serie A	0	0	0	0	0	0	0	0	0	0
A.C. Milan	2002–03	Serie A	8	0	6	0	5	0	0	0	19	0
A.C. Milan	2003–04	Serie A	8	0	5	0	1	0	0	0	14	0
A.C. Milan	Total		16	0	11	0	6	0	0	0	33	0
Career total			349	13	28	0	47	1	6	0	430	14

=== International ===
Appearances and goals by national team and year
National team	Year	Apps	Goals
Argentina	1992	4	0
Argentina	1993	13	1
Argentina	1994	9	0
Argentina	1995	0	0
Argentina	1996	0	0
Argentina	1997	0	0
Argentina	1998	0	0
Argentina	1999	3	0
Total		29	1

== Honours ==
Real Madrid

- La Liga: 1994–95, 1996–97
- Supercopa de España: 1997
- UEFA Champions League: 1997–98, 1999–2000
- Intercontinental Cup: 1998

Milan

- Serie A: 2003–04
- Coppa Italia: 2002–03
- UEFA Champions League: 2002–03
- UEFA Super Cup: 2003

Argentina U17

- South American U-17 Championship: 1985

Argentina

- Copa América: 1993
- FIFA Confederations Cup: 1992

Individual

- FIFA Confederations Cup: Golden Ball 1992
- World XI: 1996
- Tenerife Player of The Year: 1992–93, 1993–94
- Real Madrid Player of The Year: 1996–97, 1999–2000
- ESM Team of the Year: 1997–98
- Trofeo EFE: Player of The Decade 1990–99
- UEFA Club Footballer of the Year: 1999–2000
- AFA Team of All Time (published 2015)
- IFFHS Argentina All Times Dream Team: 2021
