= Ibrahim Ba =

French footballer (born 1973)

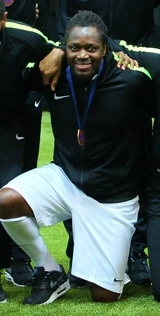
- Ibrahim Ba (2015)

Personal information
- Full name: Ibrahim Ba
- Date of birth: 12 January 1973 (age 53)
- Place of birth: Dakar, Senegal
- Height: 1.78 m (5 ft 10 in)
- Position: Right midfielder

Senior career*
Years	Team	Apps	(Gls)
1991–1996	Le Havre	128	(8)
1996–1997	Bordeaux	35	(6)
1997–2003	AC Milan	56	(1)
1999–2000	→ Perugia (loan)	16	(1)
2001	→ Marseille (loan)	9	(0)
2003–2004	Bolton Wanderers	9	(0)
2004–2005	Çaykur Rizespor	2	(0)
2005	Djurgården	14	(1)
2007–2008	AC Milan	0	(0)
Total		267	(17)

International career
1997–1998	France	8	(2)
- * Club domestic league appearances and goals

Ibrahim Ba (born 12 January 1973) is a French former professional footballer who played as a right midfielder. Starting off his career with Le Havre in France in the early 1990s, he went on to represent clubs in Italy, England, Turkey, and Sweden before retiring at AC Milan in 2008. A full international between 1997 and 1998, he won eight caps for the France national team and scored two goals.

== Career ==
=== Early career ===
Born in Senegal's capital, Dakar, Ibrahim Ngom Ba was not yet eighteen when, in 1991, he started playing for the French club Le Havre AC, where he spent five years. In 1996, he moved to fellow Ligue 1 outfit Bordeaux, reaching the final of the Coupe de la Ligue.

=== AC Milan ===
In 1997, Ba transferred from FC Girondins de Bordeaux to Milan, and in 1998–99 he won the Serie A title.

He was later loaned to AC Perugia, where he suffered a knee injury. He underwent another loan, with Olympique de Marseille, in 2001. Back in Milan, Ba won both the UEFA Champions League and the Coppa Italia during the team's highly successful 2002–03 season, although he was never a starter, making only 5 appearances in all competitions across the season.

=== Bolton Wanderers ===
In 2003, he left Milan and joined Bolton Wanderers in England. He helped them reach the 2004 Football League Cup final, playing in both legs of the semi-final victory over Aston Villa. However, he was left out of the match day squad as they lost the final to Middlesbrough. Ba made his last appearance for Bolton against Chelsea on 13 March 2004.

=== Çaykur Rizespor ===
He failed to make an impression at Bolton, and moved on to Turkey after just one season, joining Çaykur Rizespor on a one-year deal on 24 August 2004.

=== Djurgårdens IF ===
On 6 February 2005, Ba was signed by Swedish side Djurgårdens IF on a two-year contract. Djurgården won both Allsvenskan and Svenska Cupen in his first season with the club. In early 2006, it was decided that his contract would be terminated and he subsequently left Djurgården in January of that year, having played in 14 games and scored one goal.

=== Return to AC Milan ===
At the start of 2007 Ba returned to Italy to train with Serie C2 team Varese to help with his fitness. In June 2007, after traveling to Athens together with the AC Milan squad to attend the UEFA Champions League final in which they defeated English Premier League side Liverpool, Ba agreed to a one-year contract with Milan.

At the conclusion of the 2007–08 season, in which he made only one appearance in the Coppa Italia as a substitute on the bench, he retired from the game as a player and became a scout for Milan in Africa.

== International career ==
Ba won eight caps for the France national team between 1997 and 1998, and scored two goals. His two goals came in friendlies against Portugal and South Africa.

== Personal life ==
Ibrahim Ba is the son of 1970s Senegalese international footballer Ibrahima Ba (born 1951), who spent his late career in France, where he helped Le Havre AC to promotion in 1979 and finished his career at SC Abbeville. Ibrahima Ba's younger son, Fabien (born 22 October 1994) is also a footballer, playing in Italy with the Giovanissimi Nazionali of his brother Ibrahim's former club AC Milan.

In 2018, Paolo Maldini named Ba one of his close friends from the world of football.

== Career statistics ==
=== International ===
Appearances and goals by national team and year
National team	Year	Apps	Goals
France	1997	7	2
France	1998	1	0
Total		8	2

Scores and results list France's goal tally first, score column indicates score after each Ba goal.

List of international goals scored by Ibrahim Ba
No.	Date	Venue	Opponent	Score	Result	Competition	Ref.
1	22 January 1997	Estádio 1º de Maio, Braga, Portugal	Portugal	2–0	2–0	Friendly	
2	11 October 1997	Stade Bollaert-Delelis, Lens, France	South Africa	2–1	2–1	Friendly	

== Honours ==
AC Milan

- Serie A: 1998–99
- UEFA Champions League: 2002–03
- Coppa Italia: 2002–03

Djurgårdens IF

- Allsvenskan: 2005
- Svenska Cupen: 2005
