= Mattia Dal Bello =

Italian footballer

Personal information
- Date of birth: 19 January 1984
- Place of birth: Asolo, Italy
- Date of death: 12 December 2004 (aged 20)
- Place of death: Bassano del Grappa, Italy
- Height: 1.79 m (5 ft 10 1/2 in)
- Position: Midfielder

Youth career
- Reggiana
- 2000–2004: Milan

Senior career*
Years	Team	Apps	(Gls)
2002–2004	Milan	1	(0)
2004	→ Prato (loan)	13	(0)
- * Club domestic league appearances and goals

Mattia Dal Bello (19 January 1984 – 12 December 2004) was an Italian professional footballer who played as a midfielder.

== Club career ==
Born in Asolo, Dal Bello joined Milan's youth system from Reggiana in 2000. He made his professional debut on 12 December 2002, in a Coppa Italia home game against Ancona that Milan won 5–1. He went on to make his first and only Serie A appearance in a 2–4 loss to Piacenza on 24 May 2003.

In January 2004, Dal Bello was loaned out to Serie C1 club Prato, where he made 13 appearances before the deal was terminated early in November of the same year. He died in a car accident on 12 December 2004, as he drove his Audi A3 into a wall. A friend of his, who was in the car with him, survived without being seriously injured.
