= Fabio Artico =

Italian footballer (born 1973)

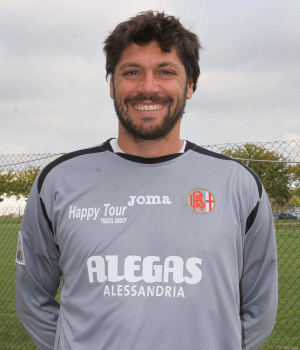

Personal information
- Date of birth: 9 December 1973 (age 52)
- Place of birth: Venaria Reale, Italy
- Position: Forward

Youth career
- Juventus

Senior career*
Years	Team	Apps	(Gls)
1993–1997	Pro Vercelli	114	(31)
1997–1999	Empoli	3	(0)
1997–1998	→ Giulianova (loan)	25	(13)
1998–1999	→ Reggina (loan)	29	(15)
1999–2000	Ternana	33	(10)
2000–2002	Pescara	26	(4)
2000–2001	→ Piacenza (loan)	24	(7)
2002–2003	SPAL	27	(9)
2003–2004	Messina	8	(0)
2004	SPAL	12	(3)
2004–2005	Ivrea	31	(8)
2005–2007	Pro Patria	60	(13)
2007–2012	Alessandria	144	(58)
- * Club domestic league appearances and goals

Fabio Artico (born 9 December 1973) is an Italian former footballer.

== Biography ==
Born in Venaria Reale, the Province of Turin, Piedmont, Artico started his career at Juventus Turin and left for Pro Vercelli in 1993, where he won Serie D champion. He played 3 more Serie C2 seasons for the Piedmontese club before left for Empoli of Serie A in 1997. After played twice at Serie A, in October he left on loan to Serie C1 side Giulianova. In the next season, he played once at 1998–99 Serie A before left for Serie B side Reggina, where he won promotion to Serie A. In 1999–2000 season he signed a 3-year contract with Ternana, also at Serie B. In 2000–01 season he left for Pescara and played 3 Serie B matches before left on loan to league rival Piacenza where he won Serie B runner-up. In 2001–02 season he returned to Pescara for Serie C1 (Group B) season. In next season, he left for SPAL of Serie C1 (Group A).

In 2003–04 season her left for Serie B side Messina but in mid-season returned to SPAL. In 2004–05 season, he left for Serie C2 side Ivrea. From 2005, he played two seasons at Serie C1 for Pro Patria. In 2007–08 season, he left for Alessandria of Serie D and followed the team promoted to Lega Pro Prima Divisione in 2009.
