= Luca Cavallo =

Italian footballer

Personal information
- Date of birth: 19 May 1973 (age 53)
- Place of birth: Rossiglione, Italy
- Height: 1.86 m (6 ft 1 in)
- Position: Midfielder

Senior career*
Years	Team	Apps	(Gls)
1991–1994	Genoa		
1994–1995	Perugia		
1995–1998	Genoa		
1998–1999	Monza		
1999–2000	Ternana		
2000–2003	Siena		
2001	→ Cagliari		
2003–2004	Genoa		
2004–2005	Pescara		
2005–2006	SPAL		
2006–2007	Pro Sesto		
2007–2008	Taranto		
2008	Novese		
2009	Sestri Levante		

Managerial career
- Virtus Entella
- Rivasamba
- 2014: Paniliakos
- * Club domestic league appearances and goals

Luca Cavallo (born 19 May 1973) is a retired Italian football midfielder.
