= Gianluca Paparesta =

Italian football referee

Gianluca Paparesta (born 25 May 1969 in Bari) is a former Italian football referee. He was implicated in the 2006 Calciopoli scandal, and has not refereed since.

== Career ==
Paparesta never refereed any World Championship or European Championship matches, but refereed nine matches in the UEFA Cup, as well as 2006 World Cup qualifiers. He refereed four Coppa Italia finals throughout his career: the second leg of 2000 final between Inter and Lazio (0–0, with Lazio winning the title on aggregate), the second leg of the 2002 Coppa Italia final between Parma and Juventus (1–0, with Parma winning the title on aggregate), the first leg of the 2003 final between Roma and Milan (1–4, with the latter team later winning the title on aggregate), and the first leg of the 2004 final between Juventus and Lazio (2–0, with Lazio eventually winning the title on aggregate). In October 2006, he was implicated in the Calciopoli Scandal and was suspended for eight months.

== Post-refereeing career ==
In May 2014, Paparesta headed a consortium that bought Serie B club A.S. Bari for € 4.8 million.

In August 2019, he was unveiled as part of the non-technical staff at the newly-refounded Palermo, where he will be in charge of media-related duties.
