= Serginho (footballer, born 1971) =

Brazilian footballer

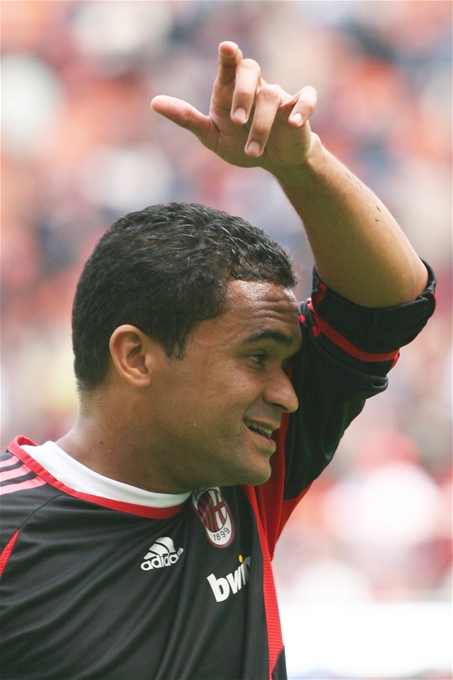
- Serginho with AC Milan in 2007

Personal information
- Full name: Sérgio Cláudio dos Santos
- Date of birth: 27 June 1971 (age 55)
- Place of birth: Nilópolis, Rio de Janeiro, Brazil
- Height: 1.81 m (5 ft 11 in)
- Positions: Left-back; left midfielder; left winger

Senior career*
Years	Team	Apps	(Gls)
1992–1993	Itaperuna	7	(0)
1993–1994	Bahia	11	(1)
1994–1995	Flamengo	17	(3)
1995–1996	Cruzeiro	23	(8)
1996–1999	São Paulo	58	(21)
1999–2008	AC Milan	185	(18)
Total		301	(51)

International career
1998–2001	Brazil	10	(1)
Medal record
Men's football
Representing Brazil
Copa América
Winner	1999 Paraguay
FIFA Confederations Cup
Runner-up	1999 Mexico
- * Club domestic league appearances and goals

Sérgio Cláudio dos Santos (born 27 June 1971), better known as Serginho, is a Brazilian former professional footballer who played as a left-back, left midfielder or left winger. Known for his speed and energetic attacking runs down the wing, he won the Champions League twice (in 2003 and 2007), as well as the Serie A title (in 2003–04), among other trophies with AC Milan. At international level, he also represented Brazil at the 1999 FIFA Confederations Cup and was part of the team that won the 1999 Copa América. Post retirement, he has acted as manager and agent for former teammate Dida.

== Club career ==
Serginho initially began his professional footballing career in his home country and played for clubs Cruzeiro, Bahia and São Paulo. He moved to Italian side AC Milan in 1999, where he was initially a fringe player, starting on the bench but often being the first-choice substitute. The apex of Serginho's Milan career was when he scored a goal and contributed three assists in a 6–0 thrashing of crosstown rivals Inter Milan on 11 May 2001. He also contributed to Milan's 2003 UEFA Champions League victory over Juventus, scoring the first of Milan's three successful penalties in the shootout. The 2005 Champions League final was a reversal of fortune, however, as Milan surrendered a 3–0 lead at half-time and eventually lost on penalties to Liverpool, with Serginho whistling his shot over the crossbar. Serginho also won the 2003–04 Serie A title and the 2006–07 edition of the UEFA Champions League with Milan, among other trophies.

On 16 May 2008, it was announced that Serginho and compatriot Cafu would be leaving Milan at the end of the 2007–08 season. Serginho also immediately announced his retirement at the end of the season. On 18 May, he played the final minutes of the match against Udinese and appeared quite moved at the end of the game.

== International career ==
Serginho earned ten caps with the Brazil national team between 1998 and 2001, with his sole goal scored in the 1999 FIFA Confederations Cup final. He would undoubtedly have won more caps, if not for the ever-present Roberto Carlos as the national team's starting left-back during Serginho's whole career. Internationally, Serginho represented his nation at the 1999 Confederations Cup, where his team won a runners-up medal, and at the 1999 Copa América, winning the latter tournament. He did not make it in Brazil's squad for the 2002 World Cup because of a hamstring injury.

== Style of play ==
Serginho was an incredibly fast and hard-working, offensive-minded player, who could play either as left-back or wing-back, or even on the left wing. He maintained his extraordinary pace and stamina well into his mid-late 30s. In addition to his speed and energy, he was also known to be an excellent crosser of the ball, and for having a knack for making overlapping runs and getting into good attacking positions, which allowed him to regularly contribute to his team's offence with several assists and even goals. His nickname throughout his career was Il Concorde ("The Concorde"), due to his quick and tireless attacking runs down the left flank of the pitch.

== Career statistics ==
=== International ===
Appearances and goals by national team and year
National team	Year	Apps	Goals
Brazil	1998	3	0
Brazil	1999	6	1
Brazil	2001	1	0
Total		10	1

Scores and results list Brazil's goal tally first, score column indicates score after each Serginho goal.

List of international goals scored by Serginho
No.	Date	Venue	Opponent	Score	Result	Competition	Ref.
1	4 August 1999	Estadio Azteca, Mexico City, Mexico	Mexico	1–2	3–4	1999 FIFA Confederations Cup	

== Honours ==
Bahia

- Campeonato Baiano: 1994

São Paulo

- Paulista Championship: 1998

AC Milan

- Serie A: 2003–04
- Coppa Italia: 2002–03
- Supercoppa Italiana: 2004
- UEFA Champions League: 2002–03, 2006–07
- UEFA Super Cup: 2003, 2007
- FIFA Club World Cup: 2007

Brazil

- Copa América: 1999
- FIFA Confederations Cup runner-up: 1999

Individual

- AC Milan Hall of Fame
