= 2002–03 Coppa Italia =

2002–2003 Coppa Italia
Tournament details
- Country: Italy
- Dates: 18 August 2002 – 31 May 2003
- Teams: 48

Final positions
- Champions: A.C. Milan (5th title)
- Runners-up: Roma

Tournament statistics
- Matches played: 94
- Goals scored: 185 (1.97 per match)
- Top goal scorer: Fabrizio Miccoli (5 goals)

The 2002–03 Coppa Italia was the 56th edition of the tournament, which began on 18 August 2002 and ended on 31 May 2003. In the final, A.C. Milan beat Roma 6–3 on aggregate to win their 5th Coppa Italia and first since the 1976–77 edition.

== Group stage ==
=== Group 1 ===
Pos	Team	Pld	W	D	L	GF	GA	GD	Pts
1	Sampdoria (B)	3	2	1	0	6	2	+4	7
2	Genoa (B)	3	1	1	1	4	4	0	4
3	Lucchese (C)	3	0	2	1	3	4	−1	2
4	Siena (B)	3	0	2	1	2	5	−3	2

Team #1	Team #2	Results
Lucchese	Genoa	1–2
Sampdoria	Siena	3–0
Siena	Lucchese	1–1
Genoa	Sampdoria	1–2
Siena	Genoa	1–1
Lucchese	Sampdoria	1–1

=== Group 2 ===
Pos	Team	Pld	W	D	L	GF	GA	GD	Pts
1	Vicenza (B)	3	3	0	0	8	2	+6	9
2	AlbinoLeffe (C)	3	1	1	1	3	4	−1	4
3	Venezia (B)	3	1	0	2	4	5	−1	3
4	Spezia (C)	3	0	1	2	1	5	−4	1

Team #1	Team #2	Results
AlbinoLeffe	Venezia	2–1
Spezia	Vicenza	0–3
Venezia	Spezia	2–1
Vicenza	AlbinoLeffe	3–1
Venezia	Vicenza	1–2
Spezia	AlbinoLeffe	0–0

=== Group 3 ===
Pos	Team	Pld	W	D	L	GF	GA	GD	Pts
1	Triestina (B)	3	2	1	0	4	1	+3	7
2	Cittadella (C)	3	1	1	1	3	2	+1	4
3	Hellas Verona (B)	3	1	1	1	2	3	−1	4
4	Treviso (C)	3	0	1	2	3	6	−3	1

Team #1	Team #2	Results
Triestina	Hellas Verona	2–0
Cittadella	Treviso	3–1
Treviso	Triestina	1–2
Hellas Verona	Cittadella	1–0
Treviso	Hellas Verona	1–1
Triestina	Cittadella	0–0

=== Group 4 ===
Pos	Team	Pld	W	D	L	GF	GA	GD	Pts
1	Empoli (A)	3	2	0	1	6	3	+3	6
2	Livorno (B)	3	2	0	1	6	5	+1	6
3	Pistoiese (C)	3	1	0	2	4	5	−1	3
4	Cagliari (B)	3	1	0	2	2	5	−3	3

Team #1	Team #2	Results
Livorno	Cagliari	2–1
Pistoiese	Empoli	2–1
Cagliari	Pistoiese	1–0
Empoli	Livorno	2–1
Empoli	Cagliari	3–0
Livorno	Pistoiese	3–2

=== Group 5 ===
Pos	Team	Pld	W	D	L	GF	GA	GD	Pts
1	Ancona (B)	3	3	0	0	6	1	+5	9
2	Ascoli (B)	3	1	1	1	3	5	−2	4
3	Lecce (B)	3	0	2	1	4	5	−1	2
4	Pescara (C)	3	0	1	2	1	3	−2	1

Team #1	Team #2	Results
Ancona	Ascoli	3–0
Pescara	Lecce	1–1
Ascoli	Pescara	1–0
Lecce	Ancona	1–2
Ascoli	Lecce	2–2
Pescara	Ancona	0–1

=== Group 6 ===
Pos	Team	Pld	W	D	L	GF	GA	GD	Pts
1	Ternana (B)	3	1	2	0	7	5	+2	5
2	Napoli (B)	3	1	1	1	4	3	+1	4
3	Lanciano (C)	3	1	1	1	5	7	−2	4
4	Salernitana (B)	3	0	2	1	4	5	−1	2

Team #1	Team #2	Results
Lanciano	Napoli	0–3
Salernitana	Ternana	2–2
Napoli	Salernitana	1–1
Ternana	Lanciano	3–3
Lanciano	Salernitana	2–1
Ternana	Napoli	2–0

=== Group 7 ===
Pos	Team	Pld	W	D	L	GF	GA	GD	Pts
1	Bari (B)	3	3	0	0	9	1	+8	9
2	Cosenza (B)	3	1	1	1	3	2	+1	4
3	Crotone (C)	3	0	2	1	1	4	−3	2
4	Catania (B)	3	0	1	2	1	7	−6	1

Team #1	Team #2	Results
Catania	Crotone	0–0
Cosenza	Bari	0–1
Bari	Catania	4–0
Crotone	Cosenza	0–0
Bari	Crotone	4–1
Catania	Cosenza	1–3

=== Group 8 ===
Pos	Team	Pld	W	D	L	GF	GA	GD	Pts
1	Reggina (A)	3	2	1	0	4	0	+4	7
2	Palermo (B)	3	1	1	1	5	2	+3	4
3	Taranto (C)	3	1	0	2	1	7	−6	3
4	Messina (B)	3	0	2	1	1	2	−1	2

Team #1	Team #2	Results
Messina	Palermo	1–1
Taranto	Reggina	0–3
Palermo	Taranto	4–0
Reggina	Messina	0–0
Palermo	Reggina	0–1
Taranto	Messina	1–0

== Knockout stage ==
Round of 32
Lazio
bye
Empoli	1	2	3
Torino	1	1	2
Bari	4	0	4
Udinese	1	1	2
Internazionale
bye
Vicenza (a.e.t.)	2	1	3
Parma	0	2	2
Bologna
bye
Triestina	1	2	3
Como	0	0	0
Roma
bye
Reggina	1	1	2
Modena	0	2	2
Juventus
bye
Sampdoria	1	1	2
Atalanta	0	1	1
Perugia
bye
Ancona	1	3	4
Brescia	1	1	2
A.C. Milan
bye
Piacenza	1	2	3
Ternana	1	0	1
Chievo
bye

Round of 16
Lazio	2	2	4
Empoli	0	1	1
Bari	1	2	3
Internazionale	0	1	1
Vicenza	1	2	3
Bologna	0	1	1
Triestina	1	1	2 (2)
Roma (p)	1	1	2 (5)
Reggina	0	1	1
Juventus	2	0	2
Sampdoria	1	0	1
Perugia	1	2	3
Ancona	1	1	2
A.C. Milan	1	5	6
Piacenza	1	0	1
Chievo	1	0	1

Quarter-finals
Lazio	2	0	2
Bari	1	0	1
Vicenza	1	3	4
Roma	2	6	8
Juventus	1	0	1
Perugia	2	2	4
A.C. Milan	0	5	5
Chievo	0	2	2

Semi-finals
Lazio	1	0	1
Roma	2	1	3
Perugia	0	1	1
A.C. Milan	0	2	2

Finals
Roma	1	2	3
A.C. Milan	4	2	6

== Final ==
=== First leg ===
20 May 2003
20:45

Roma	1–4	Milan
Totti 28'		Serginho 62' (pen.), 73'; Ambrosini 70'; Shevchenko 89'

Stadio Olimpico, Rome
Attendance: 60,647
Referee: Gianluca Paparesta

=== Second leg ===
31 May 2003
20:45

Milan	2–2	Roma
Rivaldo 65'; Inzaghi 90+3'		Totti 56', 64'

San Siro, Milan
Attendance: 76,061
Referee: Roberto Rosetti

Milan won 6–3 on aggregate.

== Top goalscorers ==
Rank	Player	Club	Goals
1	(Italy) Fabrizio Miccoli	Perugia	5
2	(Italy) Andrea Zanchetta	Vicenza	4
2	(Italy) Stefan Schwoch	Vicenza	4
2	(Italy) Matteo Beretta	Triestina	4
2	(Italy) Marco Delvecchio	Roma	4
2	(Denmark) Jon Dahl Tomasson	A.C. Milan	4
2	(Italy) Gionatha Spinesi	Bari	4
2	(Italy) Maurizio Ganz	Anconitana	4
