= 1996–97 AC Milan season =

Milan Associazione Calcio
1996–97 season
- Owner: Silvio Berlusconi
- President: Silvio Berlusconi
- Manager: Oscar Tabarez (until 1 December 1996); Arrigo Sacchi
- Stadium: San Siro
- Serie A: 11th
- Coppa Italia: Quarter-finals
- UEFA Champions League: Group stage
- Supercoppa Italiana: Runners-up
- Top goalscorer: League: George Weah (13); All: George Weah (16)
- Highest home attendance: 81,170 vs Juventus; 6 April 1997, Serie A
- Lowest home attendance: 7,242 vs Vicenza; 27 November 1996, Coppa
- Average home league attendance: 55,894
- Biggest win: 4–1 vs Hellas Verona (H); 8 September 1996, Serie A
- Biggest defeat: 1–6 vs Juventus (H); 6 April 1997, Serie A
Home colours	Away colours	Third colours

During the 1996–97 season Milan Associazione Calcio competed in Serie A, Coppa Italia, UEFA Champions League and Supercoppa.

== Summary ==
Milan Associazione Calcio fell into pieces once Fabio Capello left his job to join Real Madrid. The new organisation with Óscar Tabárez as technical director completely miscued its signings, with neither Jesper Blomqvist, Edgar Davids, Christophe Dugarry or Michael Reiziger being successful. After a Supercoppa Italiana defeat against Fiorentina at home at the San Siro, a 2–3 loss at Piacenza for the league cost the Uruguayan his position. Tabarez was replaced by former championship winning coach Arrigo Sacchi, the change did not happen and days later due to a 2–1 defeat to Rosenborg at home in the Champions League the team was not qualified to Quarterfinals. The Rossoneri eventually finished 11th managed to save the reigning champions' contract in Serie A by just six points.

The miserable season also prompted captain Franco Baresi to end his active career, with Milan retiring the #6 shirt in his honour.

== Squad ==
Note: Flags indicate national team as defined under FIFA eligibility rules; some limited exceptions apply. Players may hold more than one non-FIFA nationality.

No.	Pos.	Nation	Player
1	GK	ITA	Sebastiano Rossi
2	DF	ITA	Christian Panucci
3	DF	ITA	Paolo Maldini
4	MF	ITA	Demetrio Albertini
5	DF	ITA	Filippo Galli
6	DF	ITA	Franco Baresi (captain)
8	MF	FRA	Marcel Desailly
9	FW	LBR	George Weah
10	MF	YUG	Dejan Savićević
11	DF	ITA	Alessandro Costacurta
13	DF	ITA	Francesco Coco
14	DF	NED	Michael Reiziger
15	MF	ITA	Massimo Ambrosini
16	MF	ITA	Tomas Locatelli
17	GK	ITA	Gabriele Aldegani
18	FW	ITA	Roberto Baggio
19	FW	FRA	Christophe Dugarry

No.	Pos.	Nation	Player
20	MF	CRO	Zvonimir Boban
21	DF	ITA	Mauro Tassotti (vice-captain)
22	MF	NED	Edgar Davids
23	FW	ITA	Marco Simone
24	MF	ITA	Stefano Eranio
25	GK	ITA	Angelo Pagotto
27	FW	ITA	Luca Saudati
28	MF	ITA	Matteo Pelatti
29	DF	ITA	Pietro Vierchowod
31	MF	ITA	Vincenzo Maiolo
32	DF	ITA	Daniele Daino
34	MF	SWE	Jesper Blomqvist
35	DF	YUG	Miodrag Vukotić
36	DF	ITA	Matteo Placida
38	DF	ITA	Alberto Comazzi
39	GK	ITA	Massimo Prete
40	MF	ITA	Massimiliano Grego
42	FW	ITA	Massimo Maccarone

=== Transfers ===
In
Pos.	Name	from	Type
MF	Edgar Davids	AFC Ajax	Free
DF	Michael Reiziger	AFC Ajax	Free
GK	Angelo Pagotto	UC Sampdoria	€300,000
FW	Christophe Dugarry	Bordeaux	€1,800,000
DF	Pietro Vierchowod	Perugia	€500,000
DF	Giuseppe Cardone	Lucchese	loan ended
MF	Francesco Cozza	Lucchese	loan ended
DF	Roberto Lorenzini	Piacenza	loan ended
DF	Stefano Nava	Padova	loan ended
MF	Francesco De Francesco	Prato	

Out
Pos.	Name	To	Type
MF	Patrick Vieira	Arsenal	£3,5m[3]
FW	Paolo Di Canio	Celtic	£2m
MF	Paulo Futre	West Ham United	
GK	Mario Ielpo	Genoa	
MF	Gianluigi Lentini	Atalanta	
DF	Giuseppe Cardone	Bologna	
DF	Gianluca Sordo	Reggiana	
DF	Stefano Nava	Servette FC	
DF	Roberto Lorenzini	Lucchese	
MF	Francesco Cozza	Cagliari	loan

==== Winter ====
In
Pos.	Name	from	Type
MF	Jesper Blomqvist	IFK Göteborg	U$6,44m
DF	Miodrag Vukotić	FK Vojvodina	€500,000

Out
Pos.	Name	To	Type
DF	Christian Panucci	Real Madrid	£10m
DF	Filippo Galli	Reggiana	
MF	Tomas Locatelli	Udinese	£2m
FW	Luca Saudati	FC Lugano	loan
MF	Francesco De Francesco	Prato	loan

=== Kits ===
Home	Home alt.	Away	Third	Third alt.	Fourth	Goalkeeper

== Results ==
=== Pre-season and friendlies ===
==== Friendlies ====
27 July 1996 Friendly	Monza (Italy)	0–1	(Italy) Milan	Monza, Italy
			Baggio 74'	Attendance: 6 559

31 July 1996 Friendly	Como (Italy)	0–3	(Italy) Milan	Como, Italy
			Eranio 8'; Baggio 14'; Lentini 85'

==== Costantino Rozzi Memorial ====
3 August 1996	Perugia (Italy)	0–0 (4–3 p)	(Italy) Milan	Ascoli, Italy
				Stadium: Dal Duca; Attendance: 10 000; Referee: Ciccoianni

3 August 1996	Ascoli (Italy)	0–0 (7–6 p)	(Italy) Milan	Ascoli, Italy
				Stadium: Dal Duca; Attendance: 10 000; Referee: Verrucci

==== Trofeo de Navarra ====
7 August 1996	Osasuna (Spain)	0–4	(Italy) Milan	Pamplona, Spain
			Weah 15'; Savićević 27'; Boban 32'; Yanguas 44' (o.g.)	Stadium: Reyno de Navarra; Attendance: 12 000; Referee: Perez Izquierdo

==== Opel Master Cup ====
12 August 1996	Milan (Italy)	1–2	(France) Paris Saint-Germain	Munich, Germany
	Baggio 40'		Mboma 22'; Roche 33'	Stadium: Olympiastadion; Attendance: 45 000; Referee: Frohlich

12 August 1996	Bayern Munich (Germany)	1–2	(Italy) Milan	Munich, Germany
	Klinsmann 14'		Davids 43'; Simone 45'	Stadium: Olympiastadion; Attendance: 45 000; Referee: Fleiske

==== Amsterdam Arena Cup ====
14 August 1996	Ajax Amsterdam (Netherlands)	0–3	(Italy) Milan	Amsterdam, Netherlands
			Savićević 32'; Simone 49'; Albertini 87' (pen.)	Stadium: Amsterdam Arena; Attendance: 52 000; Referee: van der Ende

==== Luigi Berlusconi Trophy ====
21 August 1996	Milan (Italy)	1–0	(Italy) Juventus	Milan, Italy
	Eranio 84'			Stadium: San Siro; Attendance: 67 963; Referee: Ciccoianni

== Competitions ==
=== Supercoppa ===
25 August 1996	Milan	1–2	Fiorentina	Milan
20:30 CEST (UTC+02:00)	Savićević 22'		Batistuta 12', 38'	Stadium: San Siro; Attendance: 29 582; Referee: Fiorenzo Treossi

=== Serie A ===
==== League table ====
Pos	Team	Pld	W	D	L	GF	GA	GD	Pts
9	Fiorentina	34	10	15	9	46	41	+5	45
10	Atalanta	34	11	11	12	44	46	−2	44
11	Milan	34	11	10	13	43	45	−2	43
12	Roma	34	10	11	13	46	47	−1	41 (Note: Roma finished ahead of Napoli on Goal difference: Roma -1, Napoli -7.)
13	Napoli	34	9	14	11	38	45	−7	41

Source: Serie A, RSSSF.com, Soccerway
Rules for classification: 1) Points; 2) Head-to-head points; 3) Head-to-head goal difference; 4) Goal difference; 5) Goals scored; 6) Draw. (Note: Head-to-head record is used only after all the matches between the teams in question have been played).

==== Results summary ====
Overall								Home						Away					
Pld	W	D	L	GF	GA	GD	Pts	W	D	L	GF	GA	GD	W	D	L	GF	GA	GD
34	11	10	13	43	45	−2	43	8	5	4	28	20	+8	3	5	9	15	25	−10

Last updated: 26 May 2019.
Source: Competitive matches

==== Results by round ====
Round	1	2	3	4	5	6	7	8	9	10	11	12	13	14	15	16	17	18	19	20	21	22	23	24	25	26	27	28	29	30	31	32	33	34
Ground	H	A	A	H	A	H	A	H	A	H	A	H	A	H	A	H	A	A	H	H	A	H	A	H	A	H	A	H	A	H	A	H	A	H
Result	W	L	W	W	L	W	L	D	D	D	L	W	W	L	L	W	D	L	L	W	L	D	D	W	W	L	L	D	D	W	D	D	L	L
Position	1	6	5	2	6	2	4	5	8	8	9	7	3	7	9	6	7	10	12	9	11	11	12	10	7	8	12	11	11	9	9	9	10	11

Source: Competitive matches
A = Away; H = Home; W = Win; D = Draw; L = Loss; P = Postponed; = Leader, 1997–98 UEFA Champions League Group stage; = 1997–98 UEFA Champions League Second Qualifying round; = 1997–98 UEFA Cup First round

==== Matches ====
8 September 1996 1	Milan	4–1	Hellas Verona	Milan
	Simone 49', 66'; Weah 85', (yellow card); Baggio 90'; Maldini (yellow card)	Report	De Vitis 24'; Binotto (yellow card); Orlandini (yellow card); Colucci (yellow card)	Stadium: San Siro; Attendance: 54 128; Referee: Rodomonti

15 September 1996 2	Sampdoria	2–1	Milan	Genoa
	S. Rossi 45' (o.g.); Mancini 76'; Balleri (yellow card); Laigle (yellow card); Iacopino (yellow card)	Report	Weah 14'; Vierchowod (yellow card); Boban (yellow card)	Stadium: Luigi Ferraris; Attendance: 27 166; Referee: Treossi

22 September 1996 3	Bologna	1–2	Milan	Bologna
	Kolyvanov 62' (pen.); Magoni (yellow card); Marocchi (yellow card)	Report	Simone 46'; Weah 71'; Savićević 84'; Davids (red card) 86'; Albertini (yellow card)	Stadium: Renato Dall'Ara; Attendance: 36 693; Referee: Braschi

29 September 1996 4	Milan	3–0	Perugia	Milan
	Weah 2', 73'; Baggio 78'; Boban (red card) 67'; Panucci (yellow card); Eranio (yellow card)	Report	Castellini (yellow card); Giunti (yellow card)	Stadium: San Siro; Attendance: 50 994; Referee: Farina

12 October 1996 5	Roma	3–0	Milan	Rome
	Totti 13'; Cappioli 19'; Balbo 90'; Trotta (yellow card); Di Biagio (yellow card)	Report	Maldini (yellow card); Eranio (yellow card) , 58'	Stadium: Stadio Olimpico; Attendance: 63 217; Referee: Pairetto

20 October 1996 6	Milan	3–1	Napoli	Milan
	Weah 40', 58'; Baggio 77', (yellow card)	Report	André Cruz 61'; Baldini (yellow card); Ayala (yellow card); Turrini (yellow card)	Stadium: San Siro; Attendance: 58 078; Referee: Ceccarini

27 October 1996 7	Fiorentina	1–0	Milan	Florence
	Robbiati 84'; Firicano (red card) 85'; Schwarz (yellow card); Batistuta (yellow card)	Report	Eranio (red card) 45'; Desailly (yellow card); Boban (yellow card)	Stadium: Artemio Franchi; Attendance: 48 986; Referee: Trentalange

3 November 1996 8	Milan	1–1	Atalanta	Milan
	Albertini 53' (pen.); Costacurta (yellow card); Baggio '87	Report	F. Inzaghi 21', (red card) 82'; Carbone (yellow card); Herrera (yellow card)	Stadium: San Siro; Attendance: 53 821; Referee: Bettin

17 November 1996 9	Juventus	0–0	Milan	Turin
	Iuliano (yellow card); Zidane (yellow card); Jugović (yellow card)	Report	Albertini (yellow card); Davids (yellow card); Ambrosini (yellow card)	Stadium: Delle Alpi; Attendance: 54 985; Referee: Pierluigi Collina

24 November 1996 10	Milan	1–1	Inter Milan	Milan
	Baggio 3'; Maldini (yellow card); Desailly (yellow card); Davids (yellow card)	Report	Djorkaeff 13' (pen.); Galante (yellow card); Ince (yellow card); Fresi (yellow card)	Stadium: San Siro; Attendance: 80 742; Referee: Braschi

1 December 1996 11	Piacenza	3–2	Milan	Piacenza
	Valoti 9'; Di Francesco 44'; Luiso 71', (yellow card); Polonia (yellow card); Tramezzani (yellow card)	Report	Dugarry 47', 68', (yellow card); Coco (yellow card); Rossi (yellow card)	Stadium: Galleana; Attendance: 13 515; Referee: Messina

8 December 1996 12	Milan	2–1	Udinese	Milan
	Savićević 52'; Eranio 66'; Costacurta (yellow card) 83' (yellow-red card); Maldini (yellow card); Weah (yellow card)	Report	Stroppa 56'; Bia (yellow card)	Stadium: San Siro; Attendance: 49 087; Referee: Beschin

15 December 1996 13	Reggiana	0–3	Milan	Reggio Emilia
	Galli (red card) 78'; Beiersdorfer (yellow card); Schenardi (yellow card)	Report	Albertini 3', 71' (pen.), 78' (pen.)	Stadium: Giglio; Attendance: 14 500; Referee: De Santis

22 December 1996 14	Milan	0–1	Parma	Milan
	Weah 29'; Costacurta (yellow card) 62' (yellow-red card); Ambrosini 85'; Maldini 90'	Report	Stanić 45', (yellow card)	Stadium: San Siro; Attendance: 51 223; Referee: Bazzoli

5 January 1997 15	Lazio	3–0	Milan	Rome
	Signori 22'; Casiraghi 45'; Grandoni 65'; Baronio (yellow card); Nedvěd (yellow card)	Report	Albertini (yellow card); Desailly (yellow card)	Stadium: Olimpico; Attendance: 35 580; Referee: Treossi

12 January 1997 16	Milan	1–0	Vicenza	Milan
	Dugarry 21'; Desailly (yellow card) 61' (yellow-red card)	Report	Sartor (yellow card); Belotti (yellow card)	Stadium: San Siro; Attendance: 55 439; Referee: Rodomonti

19 January 1997 17	Cagliari	1–1	Milan	Cagliari
	Tovalieri 44'; Bettarini (yellow card); Dario Silva (yellow card)	Report	Simone 46'; Dugarry 65'; Ambrosini 90'; Reiziger (yellow card); Albertini (yellow card); Eranio (yellow card)	Stadium: Sant'Elia; Attendance: 21 713; Referee: Ceccarini

26 January 1997 18	Hellas Verona	3–1	Milan	Verona
	Zanini 30'; Bacci 38'; Orlandini 54'; Siviglia (yellow card); Baroni (yellow card); Maniero (yellow card)	Report	Eranio (yellow card) , 46'; Boban 67', (yellow card); Baresi (yellow card); Dugarry (yellow card)	Stadium: Marcantonio Bentegodi; Attendance: 30 795; Referee: Borriello

2 February 1997 19	Milan	2–3	Sampdoria	Milan
	Maldini 35'; Weah 37', 57'; Baresi (yellow card); Savićević (yellow card)	Report	Mancini 1', (yellow card); Ferron (red card) 24'; Mihajlović 74'; Carparelli 79'; Pesaresi (yellow card); Franceschetti (yellow card)	Stadium: San Siro; Attendance: 54 767; Referee: Bazzoli

16 February 1997 20	Milan	2–0	Bologna	Milan
	Albertini 45' (pen.); Boban (yellow card) , 56'; Blomqvist 85', (red card) 89'; Costacurta (yellow card); Savićević (yellow card)	Report	Antonioli (yellow card); Tarozzi (yellow card); Nervo (yellow card)	Stadium: San Siro; Attendance: 54 860; Referee: Bettin

23 February 1997 21	Perugia	1–0	Milan	Perugia
	Negri 18'; Castellini (yellow card); Dicara (yellow card); Goretti (yellow card)	Report	Dugarry (red card) 25'; Davids 44'; Maldini (red card) 45'	Stadium: Renato Curi; Attendance: 27 842; Referee: Stafoggia

2 March 1997 22	Milan	1–1	Roma	Milan
	Vierchowod 65'; Desailly (yellow card)	Report	Fonseca 75'; Cervone (yellow card); Bernardini (yellow card); Carboni (yellow card)	Stadium: San Siro; Attendance: 52 266; Referee: Treossi

9 March 1997 23	Napoli	0–0	Milan	Naples
		Report	Rossi (yellow card); Vierchowod (yellow card); Baggio (yellow card)	Stadium: San Paolo; Attendance: 55 071

15 March 1997 24	Milan	2–0	Fiorentina	Milan
	Desailly 62'; Albertini 90' (pen.); Savićević (yellow card)	Report	Piacentini (yellow card)	Stadium: San Siro; Attendance: 52 983; Referee: Boggi

23 March 1997 25	Atalanta	0–2	Milan	Bergamo
	Mirković (yellow card); Rossini (yellow card)	Report	Weah 11', 74'; Eranio 66'; Vierchowod (yellow card); Costacurta (yellow card); Blomqvist (yellow card); Simone (yellow card)	Stadium: Atleti Azzurri d'Italia; Attendance: 24 769; Referee: Ceccarini

6 April 1997 26	Milan	1–6	Juventus	Milan
	Simone 76'; Boban (yellow card)	Report	Jugović 19', 51'; Zidane 32' (pen.); Bokšić 39'; Vieri 71', 81'; Amoruso 73'; Di Livio (yellow card)	Stadium: San Siro; Attendance: 81 170; Referee: Braschi

13 April 1997 27	Inter Milan	3–1	Milan	Milan
	Djorkaeff 32' (pen.); Zamorano 43'; Ganz 57'	Report	Baggio 88'; Desailly (yellow card); Tassotti (yellow card)	Stadium: Giuseppe Meazza; Attendance: 70 996; Referee: Boggi

20 April 1997 28	Milan	0–0	Piacenza	Milan
	Rossi 30'; Albertini (penalty missed) 40'; Baresi (yellow card)	Report	Delli Carri (yellow card); Tramezzani (yellow card); Pari (yellow card)	Stadium: San Siro; Attendance: 48 852; Referee: Messina

4 May 1997 29	Udinese	1–1	Milan	Udinese
	Bierhoff 16'; Nicoli (yellow card) 75' (yellow-red card)	Report	Maldini 72'; Vierchowod (yellow card); Costacurta (yellow card); Desailly (yellow card)	Stadium: Friuli; Attendance: 27 743; Referee: Collina

11 May 1997 30	Milan	3–1	Reggiana	Milan
	Dugarry 12'; Albertini 69' (pen.); Weah 90'; Desailly 81'	Report	Minetti 72'; Mazzola (yellow card); De Napoli (yellow card); Longhi (yellow card)	Stadium: San Siro; Attendance: 47 061; Referee: Rossi

15 May 1997 31	Parma	1–1	Milan	Parma
	Chiesa 7'; Cannavaro (yellow card); Benarrivo (yellow card)	Report	Vierchowod 53'; Albertini 71' (pen.); Costacurta (yellow card); Baresi (yellow card); Boban (yellow card)	Stadium: Il Tardini; Attendance: 25 069; Referee: Boggi

18 May 1997 32	Milan	2–2	Lazio	Milan
	Baggio 39'; Weah 41', 64'	Report	Boban 56' (o.g.); Fuser (red card) 73'; Nedvěd 86'; Negro (yellow card); Nesta (yellow card); Casiraghi (yellow card)	Stadium: San Siro; Attendance: 48 604; Referee: Pairetto

25 May 1997 33	Vicenza	2–0	Milan	Vicenza
	Ambrosetti 6'; Belotti (yellow card) 81' (yellow-red card); Baresi 86' (o.g.); Méndez (yellow card)	Report	Eranio 11'; Maldini (yellow card); Boban (yellow card); Daino (yellow card)	Stadium: Romeo Menti; Attendance: 15 416; Referee: Farina

1 June 1997 34	Milan	0–1	Cagliari	Milan
	Savićević (red card) 64'; Comazzi (yellow card)	Report	Muzzi 10'; Pancaro (penalty missed) '41; Minotti (yellow card); Lønstrup (yellow card)	Stadium: San Siro; Attendance: 53 690; Referee: Cesari

=== Coppa Italia ===
==== Second Round ====
28 August 1996	Empoli	1–1	Milan	Empoli
20:30	Cappellini 20'	Report	Locatelli 33'; Boban (red card) 79'	Stadium: Carlo Castellani; Attendance: 10 000; Referee: Livio Bazzoli

1 September 1996 Replay	Milan	2–0	Empoli	Milan
16:00	Simone 6', 41'; Baresi 27'	Report		Stadium: San Siro; Attendance: 22 933; Referee: Roberto Bettin

==== Round of 16 ====
23 October 1996	Reggiana	0–2	Milan	Cremona
20:30	De Napoli (red card) 57'; Beiersdorfer (yellow card)	Report	Baggio 73' (pen.), 90', (yellow card); Desailly (yellow card)	Stadium: Stadio Giovanni Zini; Attendance: 4 158; Referee: Stefano Braschi
Note: A.C. Reggiana 1919 were banned from playing their home match at the Città del Tricolore.

==== Quarterfinals ====
13 November 1996 1	Milan	1–1	Vicenza	Milan
20:30	Baggio 20'; Dugarry (yellow card)	Report	Ambrosetti 11'; Lopez (yellow card) 45' (yellow-red card); Viviani (yellow card)	Stadium: San Siro; Attendance: 7 242; Referee: Robert Boggi

27 November 1996 2	Vicenza	0–0 (1a–1 agg.)	Milan	Vicenza
20:30	Belotti (red card) 88'	Report		Stadium: Romeo Menti; Attendance: 20 077; Referee: Piero Ceccarini

=== UEFA Champions League ===
==== Group stage ====
Pos	Team	Pld	W	D	L	GF	GA	GD	Pts	Qualification
1	(Portugal) Porto	6	5	1	0	12	4	+8	16	Advance to knockout stage
2	(Norway) Rosenborg	6	3	0	3	7	11	−4	9	Advance to knockout stage
3	(Italy) Milan	6	2	1	3	13	11	+2	7	
4	(Sweden) IFK Göteborg	6	1	0	5	7	13	−6	3	

Source: UEFA

===== Matches =====
11 September 1996 1	Milan (Italy)	2–3	(Portugal) FC Porto	Milan
20:30	Simone 14', (yellow card) 89'; Reiziger 40'; Weah 69', 71'; Albertini (yellow card) 78'	Report	52', (yellow card) 21' Oliveira; 75', 83' Jardel; (yellow card) 75' Mendes; (yellow card) 74' Costa; (yellow card) 60'Santos	Stadium: San Siro; Attendance: 33 000; Referee: (Netherlands) Mario van der Ende

25 September 1996 2	Rosenborg BK (Norway)	1–4	(Italy) Milan	Trondheim
20:30	Soltvedt 15'	Report	6', 21', 24' Simone; (yellow card) 37' Desailly; 42' Savićević; 55' Weah; (yellow card) 84' Costacurta	Stadium: Lerkendal Stadion; Attendance: 20 849; Referee: (England) David Elleray

16 October 1996 3	IFK Göteborg (Sweden)	2–1	(Italy) Milan	Gothenburg
20:30	Wahlstedt 75'; Alexandersson 84'	Report	52', (yellow card) 84' Weah; 70' Locatelli	Stadium: Ullevi; Attendance: 42 450; Referee: (Poland) Ryszard Wójcik

30 October 1996 4	Milan (Italy)	4–2	(Sweden) IFK Göteborg	Milan
20:30	Boban 4'; Albertini 14' (pen.), (yellow card) 81'; Locatelli 44'; Baggio 90+2'; Eranio (yellow card) 57'	Report	27' Blomqvist; 32' A. Andersson	Stadium: San Siro; Attendance: 29 803; Referee: (France) Marc Batta

20 November 1996 5	FC Porto (Portugal)	1–1	(Italy) Milan	Porto
19:30	Edmílson 71'; Conceição (yellow card) 67'; Zahovič (yellow card) 69'	Report	(yellow card) 2' Desailly; (yellow card) 4' Eranio; 56', (yellow card) 88' Davids	Stadium: Estádio das Antas; Attendance: 50 000; Referee: (Austria) Gerd Grabher
Note: Weah was banned from six European matches for breaking the nose of the Portuguese defender Jorge Costa in the players' tunnel. Weah said he exploded in frustration after putting up with racist tauntings from Costa during both of the teams' Champions League matches that autumn. Costa strenuously denied the accusations of racism and was not charged by UEFA as no witnesses could verify Weah's allegations, not even his Milan teammates. Weah later attempted to apologise to Costa but this was rebuffed by the Portuguese, who considered the charges of racist insults leveled against him to be defamatory and took Weah to court. The incident led to Costa undergoing facial surgery and he was subsequently sidelined for three weeks.

4 December 1996 6	Milan (Italy)	1–2	(Norway) Rosenborg BK	Milan
20:30	Dugarry 45', (yellow card) 45'; Baresi (yellow card) 57'	Report	29' Brattbakk; (yellow card) 31' Soltvedt; (yellow card) 57' Iversen; 70' Heggem	Stadium: San Siro; Attendance: 28 695; Referee: (Greece) Georgios Bikas

== Statistics ==
=== Appearances and goals ===
No.	Pos	Nat	Player	Total		Serie A		Coppa		Champions League	
No.	Pos	Nat	Player	Apps	Goals	Apps	Goals	Apps	Goals	Apps	Goals
1	GK	(Italy) ITA	Rossi	35	-47	26	-35	3	-1	6	-11
11	DF	(Italy) ITA	Costacurta	38	0	30	0	3	0	5	0
29	DF	(Italy) ITA	Vierchowod	18	1	16	1	2	0	0	0
6	DF	(Italy) ITA	Baresi	29	0	26	0	1	0	2	0
3	DF	(Italy) ITA	Maldini	35	1	26	1	3	0	6	0
24	MF	(Italy) ITA	Eranio	29	2	18+3	2	3+1	0	1+3	0
4	MF	(Italy) ITA	Albertini	36	9	27+2	8	2	0	5	1
8	MF	(Ghana) GHA	Desailly	37	1	29	1	3	0	5	0
20	MF	(Croatia) CRO	Boban	35	2	26+2	1	2	0	5	1
9	FW	(Liberia) LBR	Weah	35	16	25+3	13	1+1	0	5	3
23	FW	(Italy) ITA	Simone	32	10	18+5	4	2+1	2	4+2	4
25	GK	(Italy) ITA	Pagotto	11	-11	8+1	-10	2	-1	0	0
18	FW	(Italy) ITA	Baggio	33	9	16+7	5	5	3	3+2	1
34	MF	(Sweden) SWE	Blomqvist	19	1	13+6	1	0	0	0	0
13	DF	(Italy) ITA	Coco	18	0	11+3	0	3	0	0+1	0
19	FW	(France) FRA	Dugarry	26	6	10+11	5	2	0	1+2	1
10	MF	(Federal Republic of Yugoslavia) YUG	Savićević	21	1	10+7	1	2	0	2	0
22	MF	(Netherlands) NED	Davids	23	1	9+6	0	4	0	3+1	1
14	DF	(Netherlands) NED	Reiziger	17	0	7+3	0	3+1	0	2+1	0
15	MF	(Italy) ITA	Ambrosini	18	0	4+7	0	2+1	0	4	0
21	DF	(Italy) ITA	Tassotti	12	0	2+8	0	1	0	0+1	0
38	DF	(Italy) ITA	Comazzi	1	0	1	0	0	0	0	0
32	DF	(Italy) ITA	Daino	6	0	0+5	0	0+1	0	0	0
28	FW	(Italy) ITA	Pelatti	2	0	0+2	0	0	0	0	0
31	MF	(Italy) ITA	Maiolo	1	0	0	0	1	0	0	0
16	MF	(Italy) ITA	De Francesco	1	0	0	0	0+1	0	0	0
35	DF	(Federal Republic of Yugoslavia) YUG	Vukotić	0	0	0	0	0	0	0	0
36	DF	(Italy) ITA	Placida	0	0	0	0	0	0	0	0
27	MF	(Italy) ITA	Corrent	0	0	0	0	0	0	0	0
40	MF	(Italy) ITA	Grego	0	0	0	0	0	0	0	0
42	FW	(Italy) ITA	Maccarone	0	0	0	0	0	0	0	0
39	GK	(Italy) ITA	Prete	0	0	0	0	0	0	0	0
17	GK	(Italy) ITA	Aldegani	0	0	0	0	0	0	0	0
Players transferred out during the season
2	DF	(Italy) ITA	Panucci	20	0	13	0	1	0	5+1	0
5	DF	(Italy) ITA	Galli	4	0	1+1	0	0+1	0	1	0
16	MF	(Italy) ITA	Locatelli	10	2	3+2	0	1+2	1	1+1	1
26	FW	(Italy) ITA	Saudati	3	0	0+1	0	1+1	0	0	0

- Source: http://calcio-seriea.net/presenze/1996/1112/

=== Clean sheets ===
Rank	No.	Pos	Nat	Name	Serie A	Supercoppa	Coppa Italia	UEFA CL	Total
1	1	GK	(Italy)	Sebastiano Rossi	6	0	1	0	7
2	25	GK	(Italy)	Angelo Pagotto	3	0	2	0	5
Totals					9	0	3	0	12

=== Disciplinary record ===
No.	Pos	Nat	Name	Serie A			Supercoppa			Coppa Italia			UEFA CL			Total		
No.	Pos	Nat	Name	Booked	(yellow card) (yellow-red card)	Sent off (straight red)	Booked	(yellow card) (yellow-red card)	Sent off (straight red)	Booked	(yellow card) (yellow-red card)	Sent off (straight red)	Booked	(yellow card) (yellow-red card)	Sent off (straight red)	Booked	(yellow card) (yellow-red card)	Sent off (straight red)
20	MF	(Croatia)	Zvonimir Boban	6		1	1			1			2			11		2
8	MF	(France)	Marcel Desailly	8					1	1						11		1
11	DF	(Italy)	Alessandro Costacurta	9	1											10	2	
4	MF	(Italy)	Demetrio Albertini	6	1					1			2			6	0	
24	DF	(Italy)	Stefano Eranio	5			1			1			1			6	1	
3	DF	(Italy)	Paolo Maldini	5		1	1			1						5	1	
19	FW	(France)	Christophe Dugarry	3		1	1						2			6		1
1	GK	(Italy)	Sebastiano Rossi	4									0			4		
2	DF	(Italy)	Christian Panucci	5		1										4		0
29	DF	(Italy)	Pietro Vierchowod	4									0			4		
18	FW	(Italy)	Roberto Baggio	3												3		
10	MF	(Federal Republic of Yugoslavia)	Dejan Savićević	3		1										3		1
23	FW	(Italy)	Marco Simone	2												2		
15	MF	(Italy)	Massimo Ambrosini	2												2		
34	MF	(Sweden)	Jesper Blomqvist	1		1										1		1
13	DF	(Italy)	Francesco Coco	1												1		
38	DF	(Italy)	Alberto Comazzi	1												1		
32	DF	(Italy)	Daniele Daino	1												1		
16	FW	(Italy)	Tomas Locatelli	1												1		
14	DF	(Netherlands)	Michael Reiziger	1												1		
21	DF	(Italy)	Mauro Tassotti	1												1		

Players in italics left the team during the season.
