= 1997–98 AC Milan season =

Milan
1997–98 season
- President: Silvio Berlusconi
- Manager: Fabio Capello
- Stadium: San Siro
- Serie A: 10th
- Coppa Italia: Runners-up
- Top goalscorer: League: George Weah (10); All: George Weah (13)
- Highest home attendance: 81,267 vs Juventus (30 November 1997)
- Lowest home attendance: 4,553 vs AS Reggina 1914 (2 September 1997)
- Average home league attendance: 54,432
Home colours	Away colours	Third colours

AC Milan had a second consecutive disastrous season. Fabio Capello returned as coach, following the dismal second half of the 1996–97 league campaign, but failed to turn the corner, and Milan was a shadow of the team he had left the year before. With Capello's reputation seemingly ruined, he was sacked at the end of the season, with Milan finishing a mere 10th in the league.

It was the club's first season since 1976–77 not to feature captain Franco Baresi, who retired at the end of the previous campaign.

== First-team squad ==
Squad at end of season

Note: Flags indicate national team as defined under FIFA eligibility rules; some limited exceptions apply. Players may hold more than one non-FIFA nationality.

No.	Pos.	Nation	Player
1	GK	ITA	Sebastiano Rossi
3	DF	ITA	Paolo Maldini
4	MF	ITA	Demetrio Albertini
5	DF	ITA	Alessandro Costacurta
8	DF	FRA	Marcel Desailly
9	FW	NED	Patrick Kluivert
10	MF	YUG	Dejan Savićević
12	GK	ITA	Simone Braglia
13	MF	FRA	Ibrahim Ba
14	FW	LBR	George Weah
15	DF	BRA	André Cruz
17	DF	GER	Christian Ziege
19	MF	ITA	Giampiero Maini
20	MF	CRO	Zvonimir Boban
21	DF	ITA	Giuseppe Cardone
22	DF	ITA	Daniele Daino

No.	Pos.	Nation	Player
23	GK	ITA	Massimo Taibi
24	DF	CRO	Dario Smoje
25	MF	ITA	Simone Bonomi
26	DF	ITA	Alberto Comazzi
27	MF	ITA	Nicola Corrent
28	FW	ITA	Massimiliano Grego
29	MF	ITA	Roberto De Zerbi
30	MF	BRA	Leonardo
31	FW	ITA	Mirco Gasparetto
32	MF	ITA	Roberto Donadoni
33	MF	ITA	Nicola Padoin
34	FW	ITA	Massimo Maccarone
35	DF	NOR	Steinar Nilsen
36	FW	ITA	Maurizio Ganz
37	DF	FRA	Samir Beloufa
38	FW	ITA	Filippo Maniero
39	DF	ITA	Gianluca Zanetti

=== Transfers ===
In
Pos.	Name	from	Type
FW	Patrick Kluivert	Ajax Amsterdam	-
MF	Ibrahim Ba	Bordeaux	-
MF	André Cruz	Internazionale	
DF	Christian Ziege	Bayern München	-
MF	Giampiero Maini	LR Vicenza	-
DF	Giuseppe Cardone	Bologna FC 1909	-
GK	Massimo Taibi	Piacenza Calcio 1919	-
MF	Leonardo	Paris SG	
DF	Winston Bogarde	Ajax Amsterdam	-
DF	Steinar Nilsen	Tromsø IL	-
DF	Dario Smoje	HNK Rijeka	-
MF	Francesco Moriero	AS Roma	-
GK	Simone Braglia	Lucchesse 1905	-
MF	Francesco Cozza	Cagliari Calcio	loan ended
FW	Luca Saudati	A.C. Prato	-
FW	Andreas Andersson	IFK Goteborg	-

Out
Pos.	Name	To	Type
DF	Franco Baresi		retired
DF	Mauro Tassotti		retired
FW	Roberto Baggio	Bologna FC 1909	€1.80 million
FW	Marco Simone	Paris SG	
GK	Angelo Pagotto	Empoli FC	-
DF	Pietro Vierchowod	Piacenza Calcio 1919	
DF	Michael Reiziger	FC Barcelona	-
FW	Christophe Dugarry	FC Barcelona	-
MF	Stefano Eranio	Derby County F.C.	
MF	Francesco Moriero	Internazionale	-
DF	Francesco Coco	LR Vicenza	loan
MF	Massimo Ambrosini	LR Vicenza	loan
MF	Francesco Cozza	US Lecce	loan
GK	Gabriele Aldegani	A.C. Prato	loan
FW	Luca Saudati	Lecco	loan

==== Autumn ====
In
Pos.	Name	from	Type
MF	Roberto Donadoni	NY Metrostars	-

Out
Pos.	Name	To	Type
MF	Jesper Blomqvist	Parma Calcio 1913	

==== Winter ====
In
Pos.	Name	from	Type
FW	Maurizio Ganz	Inter	-
FW	Filippo Maniero	Parma Calcio 1913	-
DF	Samir Beloufa	AS Cannes	-

Out
Pos.	Name	To	Type
MF	Edgar Davids	Juventus	
FW	Andreas Andersson	Newcastle United	
DF	Winston Bogarde	FC Barcelona	
FW	Matteo Pelatti	Como	

== Results ==
=== Serie A ===
==== League table ====
Pos	Team	Pld	W	D	L	GF	GA	GD	Pts	Qualification or relegation
8	Bologna	34	12	12	10	55	46	+9	48 (Note: Bologna finished ahead of Sampdoria on head-to-head points: BOL 2–2 SAM; SAM 2–3 BOL.)	Qualification to Intertoto Cup third round
9	Sampdoria	34	13	9	12	52	55	−3	48	Qualification to Intertoto Cup second round
10	Milan	34	11	11	12	37	43	−6	44	
11	Bari	34	10	8	16	30	45	−15	38	
12	Piacenza	34	7	16	11	29	38	−9	37	

Source: 1997–98 Serie A, RSSSF.com, Soccerway
Rules for classification: 1) Points; 2) Head-to-head points; 3) Head-to-head goal difference; 4) Goal difference; 5) Goals scored; 6) Draw. (Note: Head-to-head record is used only after all the matches between the teams in question have been played).

==== Results summary ====
Overall								Home						Away					
Pld	W	D	L	GF	GA	GD	Pts	W	D	L	GF	GA	GD	W	D	L	GF	GA	GD
34	11	11	12	37	43	−6	44	6	7	4	16	13	+3	5	4	8	21	30	−9

Source: Competitive matches

==== Results by round ====
Round	1	2	3	4	5	6	7	8	9	10	11	12	13	14	15	16	17	18	19	20	21	22	23	24	25	26	27	28	29	30	31	32	33	34
Ground	A	H	A	H	A	H	A	H	A	H	H	A	H	A	H	A	H	H	A	H	A	H	A	H	A	H	A	A	H	A	H	A	H	A
Result	D	D	L	L	W	L	W	W	D	D	W	W	D	W	D	L	L	W	L	D	W	W	D	W	D	L	L	L	W	L	D	L	D	L
Position	9	12	13	14	13	13	11	8	9	9	7	6	7	5	6	8	9	9	9	9	9	8	8	8	8	8	8	8	8	9	10	10	10	10

Source: Competitive matches
A = Away; H = Home; W = Win; D = Draw; L = Loss; P = Postponed; = Leader, 1998–99 UEFA Champions League Group stage; = 1998–99 UEFA Champions League Second Qualifying round; = 1998–99 UEFA Cup First round; = Qualification to Intertoto Cup; = 1998–99 Serie B

==== Matches ====
31 August 1997 1	Piacenza	1–1	Milan	Piacenza
15:00 CEST	Delli Carri 69'	Report	Delli Carri 29' (o.g.)	Stadium: Leonardo Garilli; Attendance: 25 340; Referee: Cesari

13 September 1997 2	Milan	1–1	Lazio	Milan
16:00 CEST	Ba 37'	Report	Signori 90+4' (pen.)	Stadium: San Siro; Attendance: 67 151; Referee: Ceccarini

21 September 1997 3	Udinese	2–1	Milan	Udine
20:30 CEST	Bierhoff 25', 85'	Report	Kluivert 4'	Stadium: Friuli; Attendance: 26 231; Referee: Braschi

28 September 1997 4	Milan	0–1	Vicenza	Milan
15:00 CEST		Report	Di Napoli 45'	Stadium: San Siro; Attendance: 53 603; Referee: Pierluigi Collina

5 October 1997 5	Empoli	0–1	Milan	Empoli
15:00 CEST		Report	A. Andersson 88'	Stadium: Carlo Castellani; Attendance: 15 700; Referee: Borriello

19 October 1997 6	Milan	1–2	Lecce	Milan
15:00 CEST	Cyprien 76' (o.g.)	Report	Govedarica 2'; Casale 49' (pen.)	Stadium: San Siro; Attendance: 50 628; Referee: De Santis

2 November 1997 7	Sampdoria	0–3	Milan	Genoa
15:00 CET		Report	Weah 75', 81'; Ziege 87'	Stadium: Luigi Ferraris; Attendance: 37 000; Referee: Trentalange

9 November 1997 8	Milan	2–1	Brescia	Milan
15:00 CET	Leonardo 7', 25'	Report	Hübner 44'	Stadium: San Siro; Attendance: 49 747; Referee: Farina

22 November 1997 9	Internazionale	2–2	Milan	Milan
20:30 CET	Simeone 13'; Ronaldo 68'	Report	Weah 29'; André Cruz 80' (pen.)	Stadium: Giuseppe Meazza; Attendance: 80 905; Referee: Pierluigi Collina

30 November 1997 10	Milan	1–1	Juventus	Milan
20:30 CET	Ferrara 27' (o.g.)	Report	F. Inzaghi 32'	Stadium: San Siro; Attendance: 81 267; Referee: Pierluigi Collina

7 December 1997 11	Milan	2–0	Bari	Milan
15:00 CET	Boban 47'; Kluivert 62'	Report		Stadium: San Siro; Attendance: 47 570; Referee: Bettin

14 December 1997 12	Atalanta	1–2	Milan	Atalanta
15:00 CET	Sgrò 17'	Report	Lucarelli 2' (o.g.); Kluivert 65'	Stadium: Atleti Azzurri d'Italia; Attendance: 20 925; Referee: Boggi

21 December 1997 13	Milan	0–0	Bologna	Milan
20:30 CET		Report		Stadium: San Siro; Attendance: 47 889; Referee: Rodomonti

4 January 1998 14	Napoli	1–2	Milan	Naples
15:00 CET	Bellucci 75'	Report	Leonardo 52'; Ganz 71'	Stadium: San Paolo; Attendance: 69 577; Referee: Farina

11 January 1998 15	Milan	0–0	Roma	Milan
15:00 CET		Report		Stadium: San Siro; Attendance: 52 256; Referee: Treossi

18 January 1998 16	Parma	3–1	Milan	Parma
20:30 CET	Chiesa 33', 75'; D. Baggio 44'	Report	Ganz 70'	Stadium: Il Tardini; Attendance: 23 935; Referee: Ceccarinni

25 January 1998 17	Milan	0–2	Fiorentina	Milan
15:00 CET		Report	L. Oliveira 3'; Morfeo 52'	Stadium: San Siro; Attendance: 53 315; Referee: Borriello

1 February 1998 18	Milan	1–0	Piacenza	Milan
15:00 CET	Maniero 90'	Report		Stadium: San Siro; Attendance: 46 795; Referee: Tombolini

8 February 1998 19	Lazio	2–1	Milan	Rome
15:00 CET	Mancini 6'; Bokšić 90+3'	Report	Kluivert 90+4'	Stadium: Stadio Olimpico; Attendance: 52 215; Referee: Bazzoli

11 February 1998 20	Milan	0–0	Udinese	Milan
15:00 CET		Report		Stadium: San Siro; Attendance: 46 784; Referee: Pierluigi Collina

15 February 1998 21	Vicenza	1–4	Milan	Vicenza
CET	Otero 54'	Report	Kluivert 3', 74'; Ganz 8'; Maniero 74'	Stadium: Romeo Menti; Attendance: 16 273; Referee: Pairetto

22 February 1998 22	Milan	3–1	Empoli	Milan
15:00 CET	Weah 3'; Ganz 15'; Maniero 82'	Report	C. Esposito 65'	Stadium: San Siro; Attendance: 47 067; Referee: Boggi

1 March 1998 23	Lecce	0–0	Milan	Lecce
15:00 CET		Report		Stadium: Via del Mare; Attendance: 27 717; Referee: Bettin

8 March 1998 24	Milan	1–0	Sampdoria	Milan
15:00 CET	Ziege 38'	Report		Stadium: San Siro; Attendance: 56 062; Referee: Borriello

15 March 1998 25	Brescia	2–2	Milan	Brescia
15:00 CET	Hübner 40' (pen.); Bizzarri 68'	Report	Weah 44', 51'	Stadium: Mario Rigamonti; Attendance: 22 435; Referee: Trentalange

22 March 1998 26	Milan	0–3	Inter	Milan
20:30 CET		Report	Simeone 42', 87'; Ronaldo 77'	Stadium: San Siro; Attendance: 80 327; Referee: Bazzoli

28 March 1998 27	Juventus	4–1	Milan	Turin
20:30 CET	Del Piero 12' (pen.), 39'; F. Inzaghi 60', 83'	Report	Boban 30' (pen.)	Stadium: Delle Alpi; Attendance: 55 631; Referee: Braschi

5 April 1998 28	Bari	1–0	Milan	Bari
20:30 CEST	Masinga 81'	Report		Stadium: San Nicola; Attendance: 32 377; Referee: Rodomonti

11 April 1998 29	Milan	3–0	Atalanta	Milan
15:00 CEST	Weah 10', 53', 87'	Report		Stadium: San Siro; Attendance: 48 572; Referee: Pellegrino

19 April 1998 30	Bologna	3–0	Milan	Bologna
CEST	R. Baggio 15', 50' (pen.); Fontolan 83'	Report		Stadium: Renato Dall'Ara; Attendance: 35 983; Referee: Rossi

26 April 1998 31	Milan	0–0	Napoli	Milan
15:00 CEST		Report		Stadium: San Siro; Attendance: 47 495; Referee: Pin

3 May 1998 32	Roma	5–0	Milan	Rome
15:00 CEST	Candela 16'; Di Biagio 20' (pen.), 28'; Paulo Sérgio 39'; Delvecchio 82'	Report		Stadium: Olimpico; Attendance: 64 125; Referee: Farina

10 May 1998 33	Milan	1–1	Parma	Milan
15:00 CEST	Weah 56'	Report	André Cruz 16' (o.g.)	Stadium: San Siro; Attendance: 47 484; Referee: Messina

16 May 1998 34	Fiorentina	2–0	Milan	Florence
15:00 CEST	Robbiati 50'; Kanchelskis 55'	Report		Stadium: Artemio Franchi; Attendance: 35 239; Referee: De Santis

=== Coppa Italia ===
==== Round of 32 ====
2 September 1997 1	Milan	0–0	Reggina	Milan
		Report		Stadium: San Siro; Attendance: 4 553; Referee: De Santis

24 September 1997 2	Reggina	0–2 (0–2 agg.)	Milan	Reggio Emilia
		Report	Weah 34'; Boban 90'	Stadium: Giglio; Attendance: 10 416; Referee: Bettin

==== Round of 16 ====
16 October 1997 1	Milan	3–2	Sampdoria	Milan
	Weah 64'; Maini 74'; Kluivert 92'	Report	Tovalieri 20'; Boghossian 44'	Stadium: San Siro; Attendance: 6 589; Referee: Treossi

19 November 1997 2	Sampdoria	1–2 (3–5 agg.)	Milan	Genoa
	Mihajlović 29'	Report	Leonardo 64'; André Cruz 82' (pen.)	Stadium: Stadio Luigi Ferraris; Attendance: 28 000; Referee: Braschi

==== Quarter-finals ====
8 January 1998 1	Milan	5–0	Internazionale	Milan
20:45 CET	Albertini 29' (pen.); Ganz 33'; Savićević 44'; Colonnese 46' (o.g.); Nilsen 60'	Report		Stadium: San Siro; Attendance: 36 805; Referee: Graziano Cesari

21 January 1998 2	Internazionale	1–0 (1–5 agg.)	Milan	Milan
20:45 CET	Branca 32'	Report		Stadium: San Siro; Attendance: 9 137; Referee: Roberto Bettin

==== Semi-finals ====
18 February 1998 1	Milan	0–0	Parma	Milan
		Report		Stadium: San Siro; Attendance: 17 488; Referee: Braschi

12 March 1998 2	Parma	2–2 (2–2a agg.)	Milan	Parma
	Chiesa 49'; Stanić 87'		Kluivert 47', 90+3'	Stadium: Il Tardini; Attendance: 29 000; Referee: Pairetto

==== Final ====
8 April 1998 1	Milan	1–0	Lazio	Milan
	Weah 90'	Report		Stadium: San Siro; Attendance: 63,564; Referee: Livio Bazzoli

29 April 1998 2	Lazio	3–1 (3–2 agg.)	Milan	Rome
	Gottardi 56'; Jugović 59' (pen.); Nesta 66'	Report	Albertini 47'	Stadium: Stadio Olimpico; Attendance: 64,189; Referee: Florenzo Treossi

== Statistics ==
=== Players statistics ===
No.	Pos	Nat	Player	Total		Serie A		Coppa Italia	
No.	Pos	Nat	Player	Apps	Goals	Apps	Goals	Apps	Goals
1	GK	(Italy) ITA	Rossi	27	-34	17	-25	10	-9
21	DF	(Italy) ITA	Cardone	25	0	16+3	0	6	0
5	DF	(Italy) ITA	Costacurta	37	0	29	0	8	0
8	DF	(France) FRA	Desailly	41	0	33	0	8	0
3	DF	(Italy) ITA	Maldini	37	0	30	0	7	0
13	MF	(France) FRA	Ibrahim Ba	40	1	30+1	1	9	0
4	MF	(Italy) ITA	Albertini	37	2	28	0	9	2
20	MF	(Croatia) CRO	Boban	29	3	19+4	2	6	1
30	MF	(Brazil) BRA	Leonardo	32	4	20+7	3	5	1
9	FW	(Netherlands) NED	Kluivert	33	9	26+1	6	6	3
14	FW	(Liberia) LBR	Weah	32	13	23+1	10	8	3
23	GK	(Italy) ITA	Taibi	17	-18	17	-18	0	0
17	DF	(Germany) GER	Ziege	27	2	18+4	2	5	0
36	FW	(Italy) ITA	Ganz	25	5	14+5	4	6	1
22	DF	(Italy) ITA	Daino	18	0	11+3	0	4	0
15	DF	(Brazil) BRA	André Cruz	14	2	11	1	3	1
19	MF	(Italy) ITA	Maini	31	1	8+17	0	6	1
32	MF	(Italy) ITA	Donadoni	19	0	8+7	0	4	0
10	MF	(Federal Republic of Yugoslavia) YUG	Savicevic	15	1	6+2	0	7	1
24	DF	(Croatia) CRO	Smoje	9	0	4+2	0	3	0
11	FW	(Sweden) SWE	Andersson	18	3	3+10	3	5	0
38	FW	(Italy) ITA	Maniero	16	3	3+10	3	3	0
35	DF	(Norway) NOR	Nilsen	7	1	2+3	0	2	1
7	MF	(Netherlands) NED	Davids	7	0	0+4	0	3	0
2	DF	(Netherlands) NED	Bogarde	4	0	0+3	0	1	0
37	DF	(France) FRA	Beloufa	4	0	0+3	0	1	0
16	MF	(Sweden) SWE	Blomqvist	2	0	0+1	0	1	0
26	DF	(Italy) ITA	Comazzi	2	0	0+1	0	1	0
12	GK	(Italy) ITA	Braglia	0	0	0	0	0	0
25	MF	(Italy) ITA	Bonomi	0	0	0	0	0	0
27	MF	(Italy) ITA	Corrent	0	0	0	0	0	0
33	MF	(Italy) ITA	Padoin	0	0	0	0	0	0
34	FW	(Italy) ITA	Maccarone	0	0	0	0	0	0
28	FW	(Italy) ITA	Grego	0	0	0	0	0	0
29	MF	(Italy) ITA	Zerbi	0	0	0	0	0	0
31	FW	(Italy) ITA	Gasparetto	0	0	0	0	0	0
39	DF	(Italy) ITA	Zanetti	0	0	0	0	0	0

- Source: http://calcio-seriea.net/presenze/1997/1137/

== Sources ==
- RSSSF - Italy 1997/98
