= 1996–97 Bologna FC 1909 season =

Bologna Football Club 1909
1996–97 season
- President: Giuseppe Gazzoni Frascara
- Manager: Renzo Ulivieri
- Stadium: Stadio Renato Dall'Ara
- Serie A: 7th
- Coppa Italia: Semifinals
- Top goalscorer: League: Igor Kolyvanov (11); All: Kolyvanov (12)
| Home colours | Away colours |

During the 1996–97 season Bologna Football Club 1909 competed in Serie A and Coppa Italia.

== Summary ==
Newcomers in Serie A, Bologna, finished in a decent 7th place almost reaching an UEFA Cup spot. In Coppa Italia, the squad reached the semifinals defeated by future champions Vicenza of Francesco Guidolin.

Manager Renzo Ulivieri built a balanced squad with experienced players and young stars emerging during the campaign included former goalkeeper Francesco Antonioli, defenders Michele Paramatti, Stefano Torrisi and Giuseppe Cardone. Meanwhile, the offensive saw the Russian duo: former Inter midfielder Igor Shalimov and forward Igor Kolyvanov was able to play as a pure striker once again, without having responsibilities across the entire field like in Foggia. This immediately reflected on his goal scoring, and he was Bologna's top striker in his first season, with 11 goals in 27 games. Also Swedish striker Kennet Andersson, whom arrived in the summer from relegated A.S. Bari, had a decent campaign.

== Squad ==
Note: Flags indicate national team as defined under FIFA eligibility rules; some limited exceptions apply. Players may hold more than one non-FIFA nationality.

| No. | Pos. | Nation | Player |
|---|---|---|---|
| 1 | GK | ITA | Francesco Antonioli |
| 2 | DF | ITA | Andrea Tarozzi |
| 3 | DF | ITA | Michele Paramatti |
| 4 | MF | ITA | Andrea Bergamo |
| 5 | DF | ITA | Marco De Marchi |
| 6 | DF | ITA | Giuseppe Cardone |
| 7 | FW | ITA | Pierpaolo Bresciani |
| 8 | MF | ITA | Cristiano Scapolo |
| 9 | MF | ITA | Giancarlo Marocchi |
| 10 | FW | RUS | Igor Kolyvanov |
| 11 | MF | ITA | Oscar Magoni |
| 12 | GK | ITA | Francesco Gnudi |
| 13 | DF | ITA | Cristiano Pavone |
| 14 | MF | ITA | Davide Olivares |

| No. | Pos. | Nation | Player |
|---|---|---|---|
| 15 | FW | ITA | Michele De Simone |
| 16 | FW | ITA | Carlo Nervo |
| 17 | MF | ITA | Giuseppe Anaclerio |
| 18 | FW | ITA | Davide Fontolan |
| 19 | FW | SWE | Kennet Andersson |
| 20 | DF | ITA | Stefano Torrisi |
| 22 | GK | ITA | Alex Brunner |
| 23 | DF | ITA | Fabio Gianella |
| 24 | MF | ITA | Andrea Seno |
| 25 | MF | RUS | Igor Shalimov |
| 27 | DF | ITA | Amedeo Mangone |
| 30 | MF | ITA | Massimo Brambilla |
| 31 | MF | ITA | Marco Schenardi |

=== Transfers ===
In
| Pos. | Name | from | Type |
|---|---|---|---|
| FW | Kennet Andersson | AS Bari | €4.70 million |
| DF | Giuseppe Cardone | AC Milan | |
| MF | Giancarlo Marocchi | Juventus | |
| FW | Igor Kolyvanov | Foggia Calcio | |
| GK | Alex Brunner | Foggia Calcio | |
| MF | Davide Fontolan | Inter | |
| MF | Andrea Seno | Inter | |
| MF | Igor Shalimov | Inter | |

Out
| Pos. | Name | To | Type |
|---|---|---|---|
| MF | Cristiano Doni | Brescia Calcio | |
| MF | Fabian Valtolina | Piacenza Calcio | |
| MF | Davide Morello | Genoa CFC | |
| MF | Giovanni Bosi | Cesena | |
| DF | Rosario Pergolizzi | Brescia Calcio | |
| FW | Giorgio Bresciani | Cremonese | |
| FW | Giovanni Cornacchini | Vicenza Calcio | |
| GK | Fabio Marchioro | AC Pavia | |

== Competitions ==
=== Serie A ===
==== League table ====
| Pos | Team | Pld | W | D | L | GF | GA | GD | Pts | Qualification or relegation |
|---|---|---|---|---|---|---|---|---|---|---|
| 5 | Udinese | 34 | 15 | 9 | 10 | 53 | 41 | +12 | 54 | Qualification to UEFA Cup |
| 6 | Sampdoria | 34 | 14 | 11 | 9 | 60 | 46 | +14 | 53 | Qualification to UEFA Cup |
| 7 | Bologna | 34 | 13 | 10 | 11 | 50 | 44 | +6 | 49 | |
| 8 | Vicenza | 34 | 12 | 11 | 11 | 43 | 38 | +5 | 47 | Qualification to Cup Winners' Cup |
| 9 | Fiorentina | 34 | 10 | 15 | 9 | 46 | 41 | +5 | 45 | |

Source: Serie A, RSSSF.com, Soccerway
Rules for classification: 1) Points; 2) Head-to-head points; 3) Head-to-head goal difference; 4) Goal difference; 5) Goals scored; 6) Draw. (Note: Head-to-head record is used only after all the matches between the teams in question have been played).

==== Results by round ====
| Round | 1 | 2 | 3 | 4 | 5 | 6 | 7 | 8 | 9 | 10 | 11 | 12 | 13 | 14 | 15 | 16 | 17 | 18 | 19 | 20 | 21 | 22 | 23 | 24 | 25 | 26 | 27 | 28 | 29 | 30 | 31 | 32 | 33 | 34 |
|---|---|---|---|---|---|---|---|---|---|---|---|---|---|---|---|---|---|---|---|---|---|---|---|---|---|---|---|---|---|---|---|---|---|---|
| Ground | H | A | H | A | A | H | A | H | A | H | A | H | A | A | H | A | H | A | H | A | H | H | A | H | A | H | A | H | A | H | H | A | H | A |
| Result | W | W | L | D | W | L | L | W | W | W | L | D | D | D | L | L | W | W | W | L | D | W | L | W | D | W | D | L | D | W | L | D | L | D |
| Position | 1 | 1 | 4 | 4 | 2 | 4 | 10 | 4 | 3 | 2 | 3 | 4 | 3 | 4 | 7 | 11 | 7 | 5 | 3 | 3 | 5 | 5 | 5 | 4 | 5 | 3 | 4 | 5 | 5 | 4 | 6 | 6 | 7 | 7 |

Updated to match(es) played on 1 June 1997. Source: Competitive matches
A = Away; H = Home; W = Win; D = Draw; L = Loss; = Leader, 1997–98 UEFA Champions League Group stage; = 1997–98 UEFA Champions League Second Qualifying round; = 1997–98 UEFA Cup First round; = Relegation to 1997–98 Serie B

==== Matches ====
| 7 September 1996 1 | Bologna | 1–0 | Lazio | Bologna |
| | Fontolan 35' | Report | | Stadium: Stadio Renato Dall'Ara; Referee: Alfredo Trentalange |

| 15 September 1996 2 | Hellas Verona | 0–2 | Bologna | Verona |
| | | Report | 43' Kolyvanov; 84' Nervo | Stadium: Stadio Marcantonio Bentegodi; Referee: Graziano Cesari |

| 22 September 1996 3 | Bologna | 1–2 | Milan | Bologna |
| | Kolyvanov 52' (pen.) | Report | 46' Simone; 61' Weah | Stadium: Stadio Renato Dall'Ara; Referee: Stefano Braschi |

| 29 September 1996 4 | Udinese | 2–2 | Bologna | Udine |
| | Bia 5'; Bierhoff 16' | Report | 39' Marocchi; 86' Nervo | Stadium: Stadio Friuli; Referee: Daniele Tombolini |

| 13 October 1996 5 | Bologna | 2–1 | Sampdoria | Bologna |
| | Fontolan II 46'; Šalimov 60' | Report | 79' Carparelli | Stadium: Stadio Renato Dall'Ara; Referee: Piero Ceccarini |

| 20 October 1996 6 | Bologna | 0–2 | Fiorentina | Bologna |
| | | Report | 44' Batistuta; 80' (o.g.) De Marchi | Stadium: Stadio Renato Dall'Ara; Referee: Graziano Cesari |

| 27 October 1996 7 | Napoli | 3–2 | Bologna | Naples |
| | Caccia 42' (pen.); Aglietti 51'; André Cruz 64' | Report | 20' Nervo; 74' Bresciani | Stadium: Stadio San Paolo; Referee: Racalbuto |

| 3 November 1996 8 | Bologna | 3–2 | Roma | Bologna |
| | Kolyvanov 41'; Marocchi 54'; Bresciani 78' | Report | 64' (pen.), 86' (pen.) Balbo | Stadium: Stadio Renato Dall'Ara; Referee: Gennaro Borriello |

| 17 November 1996 9 | Reggiana | 1–3 | Bologna | Reggio Emilia |
| | Valencia 42' | Report | 52' Andersson; 70' Paramatti; 77' (pen.) Kolyvanov | Stadium: Stadio Giglio; Referee: Gianni Beschin |

| 24 November 1996 10 | Bologna | 3–1 | Atalanta | Bologna |
| | Fortunato 24' (o.g.); Kolyvanov 55'; Bresciani 58' | Report | 73' Inzaghi | Stadium: Stadio Renato Dall'Ara; Referee: Loris Stafoggia |

| 1 December 1996 11 | Juventus | 1–0 | Bologna | Turin |
| | Zidane 51' | Report | | Stadium: Stadio delle Alpi; Referee: Piero Ceccarini |

| 8 December 1996 12 | Bologna | 1–1 | Piacenza | Bologna |
| | Paramatti 52' | Report | 89' Tentoni | Stadium: Stadio Renato Dall'Ara; Referee: Alfredo Trentalange |

| 15 December 1996 13 | Cagliari | 2–2 | Bologna | Cagliari |
| | Muzzi 19'; Pancaro 22' (pen.) | Report | 12' Kolyvanov; 33' (o.g.) Pascolo | Stadium: Stadio Sant'Elia; Referee: Daniele Tombolini |

| 22 December 1996 14 | Bologna | 0–0 | Perugia | Bologna |
| | | Report | | Stadium: Stadio Renato Dall'Ara; Referee: Cosimo Bolognino |

| 5 January 1997 15 | Vicenza | 2–0 | Bologna | Vicenza |
| | Otero 64', 82' (pen.) | Report | | Stadium: Stadio Romeo Menti; Referee: Marcello Nicchi |

| 12 January 1997 16 | Bologna | 0–1 | Parma | Bologna |
| | | Report | 45' Strada | Stadium: Stadio Renato Dall'Ara; Referee: Domenico Messina |

| 19 January 1997 17 | Inter | 0–2 | Bologna | Milan |
| | | Report | 38' Marocchi; 90' Shalimov | Stadium: Stadio Giuseppe Meazza; Referee: Robert Boggi |

| 26 January 1997 18 | Lazio | 1–2 | Bologna | Rome |
| | Casiraghi 46' | Report | 42' Andersson; 59' Nervo | Stadium: Stadio Olimpico; Referee: Livio Bazzoli |

| 2 February 1997 19 | Bologna | 6–1 | Hellas Verona | Bologna |
| | Scapolo 14', 49'; Paramatti 21'; Marocchi 27'; Andersson 43'; Šalimov 81' | Report | 19' Zanini | Stadium: Stadio Renato Dall'Ara; Referee: Lana |

| 16 February 1997 20 | Milan | 2–0 | Bologna | Milan |
| | Albertini 45' (pen.); Blomqvist 85' | Report | | Stadium: Stadio Giuseppe Meazza; Referee: Bettin |

| 23 February 1997 21 | Bologna | 0–0 | Udinese | Bologna |
| | | Report | | Stadium: Stadio Renato Dall'Ara; Referee: Graziano Cesari |

| 2 March 1997 22 | Sampdoria | 1–2 | Bologna | Genoa |
| | Montella 23' | Report | 50', 90' Kolyvanov | Stadium: Stadio Luigi Ferraris; Referee: Emilio Pellegrino |

| 9 March 1997 23 | Fiorentina | 3–2 | Bologna | Florence |
| | Baiano 19' (pen.); Batistuta 61'; Robbiati 79' | Report | 2' Andersson; 25' (o.g.) Firicano | Stadium: Stadio Comunale; Referee: Pasquale Rodomonti |

| 16 March 1997 24 | Bologna | 2–1 | Napoli | Bologna |
| | Andersson 40'; Kolyvanov 46' (pen.) | Report | 45' Altomare | Stadium: Stadio Renato Dall'Ara; Referee: Pierluigi Pairetto |

| 23 March 1997 25 | Roma | 1–1 | Bologna | Rome |
| | Fonseca 74' | Report | 55' Schenardi | Stadium: Stadio Olimpico; Referee: Bettin |

| 6 April 1997 26 | Bologna | 3–2 | Reggiana | Bologna |
| | Kolyvanov 45' (pen.), 61'; Andersson 54' | Report | 22' Valencia; 90' (pen.) Parente | Stadium: Stadio Renato Dall'Ara; Referee: Tarcisio Serena |

| 13 April 1997 27 | Atalanta | 1–1 | Bologna | Bergamo |
| | Torrisi 50' (o.g.) | Report | 72' Scapolo | Stadium: Stadio Atleti Azzurri d'Italia; Referee: Alfredo Trentalange |

| 19 April 1997 28 | Bologna | 0–1 | Juventus | Bologna |
| | | Report | 40' Bokšić | Stadium: Stadio Renato Dall'Ara; Referee: Piero Ceccarini |

| 4 May 1997 29 | Piacenza | 1–1 | Bologna | Piacenza |
| | Di Francesco 17' | Report | 86' Andersson | Stadium: Stadio Leonardo Garilli; Referee: Stefano Braschi |

| 11 May 1997 30 | Bologna | 3–0 | Cagliari | Bologna |
| | Scapolo 28'; Fontolan 59'; Andersson 88' | Report | | Stadium: Stadio Renato Dall'Ara; Referee: Daniele Tombolini |

| 15 May 1997 31 | Perugia | 5–1 | Bologna | Perugia |
| | Negri 24', 56', 88'; Castellini 70'; Rudi 80' | Report | 73' (pen.) Scapolo | Stadium: Stadio Renato Curi; Referee: Cosimo Bolognino |

| 18 May 1997 32 | Bologna | 0–0 | Vicenza | Bologna |
| | | Report | | Stadium: Stadio Renato Dall'Ara; Referee: Emilio Pellegrino |

| 25 May 1997 33 | Parma | 1–0 | Bologna | Parma |
| | Chiesa 73' | Report | | Stadium: Stadio Ennio Tardini; Referee: Fiorenzo Treossi |

| 1 June 1997 34 | Bologna | 2–2 | Inter | Bologna |
| | Shalimov 5'; Paramatti 75' | Report | 51', 65' Ganz | Stadium: Stadio Renato Dall'Ara; Referee: Robert Boggi |

=== Coppa Italia ===
==== Second round ====
| 2 October 1996 | Bologna | 2–1 | Torino | Bologna |
| | Andersson 36'; Casazza 86' (o.g.) | | 31' Lombardini | Stadium: Stadio Renato Dall'Ara; Referee: Robert Boggi |

==== Eightfinals ====
| 23 October 1996 | Bologna | 3–1 | Fiorentina | Bologna |
| | Magoni 16'; Paramatti 61'; Scapolo 71' | | 35' Orlando | Stadium: Stadio Renato Dall'Ara; Referee: Pierluigi Pairetto |

==== Quarterfinals ====
| 13 November 1996 | Cremonese | 1–3 | Bologna | Cremona |
| | Maspero 39' | | 23', 90' Andersson; 78' Magoni | Stadium: Stadio Giovanni Zini; Referee: Livio Bazzoli |

| 26 November 1996 | Bologna | 2–1 | Cremonese | Bologna |
| | Bresciani 3'; Kolyvanov 76' (pen.) | | 26' (pen.) Maspero | Stadium: Stadio Renato Dall'Ara; Referee: Pasquale Rodomonti |

==== Semifinals ====
| 6 February 1997 | Vicenza | 1–0 | Bologna | Vicenza |
| | Murgita 45' | | | Stadium: Stadio Romeo Menti; Referee: Pierluigi Pairetto |

| 25 February 1997 | Bologna | 1–1 | Vicenza | Bologna |
| | Scapolo 44' | | 89' Cornacchini | Stadium: Stadio Renato Dall'Ara; Referee: Robert Boggi |

== Statistics ==
=== Squad statistics ===
| Competition | Points | Home | | | | | | Away | | | | | | Total | | | | | | GD |
| Competition | Points | G | W | D | L | Gs | Ga | G | W | D | L | Gs | Ga | G | W | D | L | Gs | Ga | GD |
|---|---|---|---|---|---|---|---|---|---|---|---|---|---|---|---|---|---|---|---|---|
| 1996-97 Serie A | 49 | 17 | 8 | 5 | 4 | 27 | 17 | 17 | 5 | 5 | 7 | 23 | 27 | 34 | 13 | 10 | 11 | 50 | 44 | +6 |
| 1996-97 Coppa Italia | | 4 | 3 | 1 | 0 | 8 | 4 | 2 | 1 | 0 | 1 | 3 | 2 | 6 | 4 | 1 | 1 | 11 | 6 | +5 |
| Total | | 21 | 11 | 5 | 4 | 35 | 21 | 19 | 6 | 5 | 8 | 26 | 29 | 40 | 17 | 11 | 12 | 61 | 48 | +13 |

=== Player statistics ===
| No. | Pos | Nat | Player | Total | | Serie A | | Coppa Italia | |
| No. | Pos | Nat | Player | Apps | Goals | Apps | Goals | Apps | Goals |
|---|---|---|---|---|---|---|---|---|---|
| 1 | GK | (Italy) ITA | Antonioli | 39 | -48 | 33 | -42 | 6 | -6 |
| 6 | DF | (Italy) ITA | Cardone | 30 | 0 | 18+6 | 0 | 6 | 0 |
| 2 | DF | (Italy) ITA | Tarozzi | 31 | 0 | 25+1 | 0 | 5 | 0 |
| 3 | DF | (Italy) ITA | Paramatti | 38 | 5 | 33 | 4 | 5 | 1 |
| 20 | DF | (Italy) ITA | Torrisi | 32 | 0 | 28 | 0 | 4 | 0 |
| 8 | MF | (Italy) ITA | Scapolo | 36 | 7 | 24+6 | 5 | 6 | 2 |
| 9 | MF | (Italy) ITA | Marocchi | 38 | 4 | 28+5 | 4 | 5 | 0 |
| 5 | MF | (Italy) ITA | De Marchi | 25 | 0 | 21+2 | 0 | 2 | 0 |
| 16 | MF | (Italy) ITA | Nervo | 34 | 4 | 20+9 | 4 | 5 | 0 |
| 10 | FW | (Russia) RUS | Kolyvanov | 31 | 12 | 26+1 | 11 | 4 | 1 |
| 19 | FW | (Sweden) SWE | Andersson | 35 | 11 | 29 | 8 | 6 | 3 |
| 22 | GK | (Italy) ITA | Brunner | 1 | -2 | 1 | -2 | 0 | 0 |
| 11 | MF | (Italy) ITA | Magoni | 30 | 2 | 19+6 | 0 | 5 | 2 |
| 27 | DF | (Italy) ITA | Mangone | 24 | 0 | 18+3 | 0 | 3 | 0 |
| 18 | MF | (Italy) ITA | Fontolan | 18 | 3 | 16+1 | 3 | 1 | 0 |
| 30 | MF | (Italy) ITA | Brambilla | 16 | 0 | 10+4 | 0 | 2 | 0 |
| 4 | MF | (Italy) ITA | Bergamo | 10 | 0 | 7+2 | 0 | 1 | 0 |
| 7 | FW | (Italy) ITA | Bresciani | 24 | 4 | 6+15 | 3 | 3 | 1 |
| 31 | MF | (Italy) ITA | Schenardi | 13 | 1 | 6+7 | 1 | 0 | 0 |
| 25 | MF | (Russia) RUS | Shalimov | 21 | 4 | 3+15 | 4 | 3 | 0 |
| 13 | DF | (Italy) ITA | Pavone | 7 | 0 | 2+3 | 0 | 2 | 0 |
| 24 | MF | (Italy) ITA | Seno | 15 | 0 | 1+10 | 0 | 4 | 0 |
| 17 | MF | (Italy) ITA | Anaclerio | 1 | 0 | 0 | 0 | 1 | 0 |
| 14 | MF | (Italy) ITA | Olivares | 2 | 0 | 0+1 | 0 | 1 | 0 |
| 12 | GK | (Italy) ITA | Gnudi | 0 | 0 | 0 | 0 | 0 | 0 |

- Source: http://calcio-seriea.net/rose/1996/1106/

|}

== Bibliography ==
- Beltrami, 1996. Almanacco illustrato del calcio 1997. Modena. Panini, 1996.
- Arrigo Beltrami, 1997. Almanacco illustrato del calcio.
- Almanacco illustrato del calcio 1998. Modena. Panini, 1997.
- Carlo Felice Chiesa (2019). Bologna Centodieci. L'epopea, la gloria, le immagini inedite,2019. Edizioni Minerva. ISBN 978-88-332-4184-5.
