= Maiolo (disambiguation) =

Maiolo may refer to:

- Majolus of Cluny, Saint (910-994), Roman Catholic monk and fourth abbot of Cluny
- Alex Maiolo, American musician, writer, and health care reform advocate
- Mario Maiolo, vice-president of the province of Cosenza, Italy
- Susanna Maiolo (born 1984), a woman with Italian and Swiss citizenship who rushed towards Pope Benedict XVI twice
- Tiziana Maiolo (born 1941), Italian politician
- Vincenzo Maiolo (born 1978), Italian former footballer
- Maiolo, a comune (municipality) in the Province of Rimini, Emilia Romagna, Italy
