= Edgar Davids =

Dutch footballer and manager (born 1973)

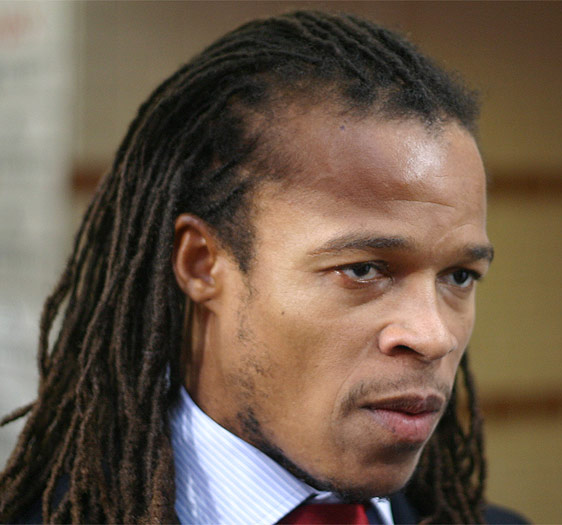
- Davids in 2007

Personal information
- Full name: Edgar Steven Davids
- Date of birth: 13 March 1973 (age 53)
- Place of birth: Paramaribo, Suriname
- Height: 1.69 m (5 ft 7 in)
- Position: Midfielder

Youth career
- 1985–1991: Ajax

Senior career*
Years	Team	Apps	(Gls)
1991–1996	Ajax	106	(20)
1996–1997	AC Milan	19	(1)
1997–2004	Juventus	159	(9)
2004	→ Barcelona (loan)	18	(1)
2004–2005	Inter Milan	14	(0)
2005–2007	Tottenham Hotspur	40	(1)
2007–2009	Ajax	25	(1)
2010	Crystal Palace	6	(0)
2012–2014	Barnet	36	(1)
Total		423	(34)

International career
1992–1994	Netherlands U-21	8	(1)
1994–2005	Netherlands	74	(6)

Managerial career
- 2012–2014: Barnet (player-manager)
- 2020–2021: Telstar (assistant)
- 2021: Olhanense
- 2022: Netherlands (assistant)
Medal record
Representing Netherlands
UEFA European Championship
Bronze medal – third place	2000
Bronze medal – third place	2004
- * Club domestic league appearances and goals

Edgar Steven Davids (Dutch pronunciation: [ˈɛdɡɑr ˈdaːvɪts]; born 13 March 1973) is a Dutch former professional footballer who played as a defensive midfielder. Davids was nicknamed "The Pitbull" because of his marking ability, aggression, and hard tackling style of play.

After beginning his career with Ajax, winning several domestic and international titles, he subsequently played in Italy for AC Milan, and later enjoyed a successful spell with Juventus, before being loaned out to Barcelona in 2004. He went on to play for Inter Milan and Tottenham Hotspur before returning to Ajax. Having struggled with injuries for two years, Davids returned to competitive football during a brief spell with Crystal Palace before retiring at the age of 37. In 2012, he was appointed player-manager at the English League Two club Barnet. He resigned by mutual agreement as manager in January 2014. He was capped 74 times by the Netherlands at international level, scoring six goals, and represented his country at the 1998 FIFA World Cup and the UEFA European Championship (three times: 1996, 2000, and 2004).

One of the most recognizable players of his generation, Davids often stood out on the football field due to his dreadlocked hair and the protective goggles he wore due to glaucoma. In 2004 he was chosen by Pelé to feature in the FIFA 100, his list of the world's greatest living footballers, as a midfielder.

== Early life ==
Edgar Steven Davids was born on 13 March 1973, in Paramaribo, Suriname and is of Afro-Surinamese descent, with Jewish heritage from his mother. The family moved to the Netherlands when Davids was an infant. His cousin Lorenzo is also a footballer.

== Club career ==
=== Ajax ===
After being rejected on two previous occasions by the club, Davids started his career at the age of 12 with Ajax. He made his first team debut on 6 September 1991 in a 5–1 home win over RKC Waalwijk. He helped the Amsterdam club to three domestic Eredivisie titles, as well as continental success with the 1992 UEFA Cup and the 1995 UEFA Champions League. In the 1996 UEFA Champions League final, he missed Ajax's first penalty in the shoot-out, which they ultimately lost to Juventus. While at Ajax, Davids was nicknamed "The Pitbull" by Ajax manager Louis van Gaal due to his fierce style of play in the team's midfield.

=== AC Milan and Juventus ===
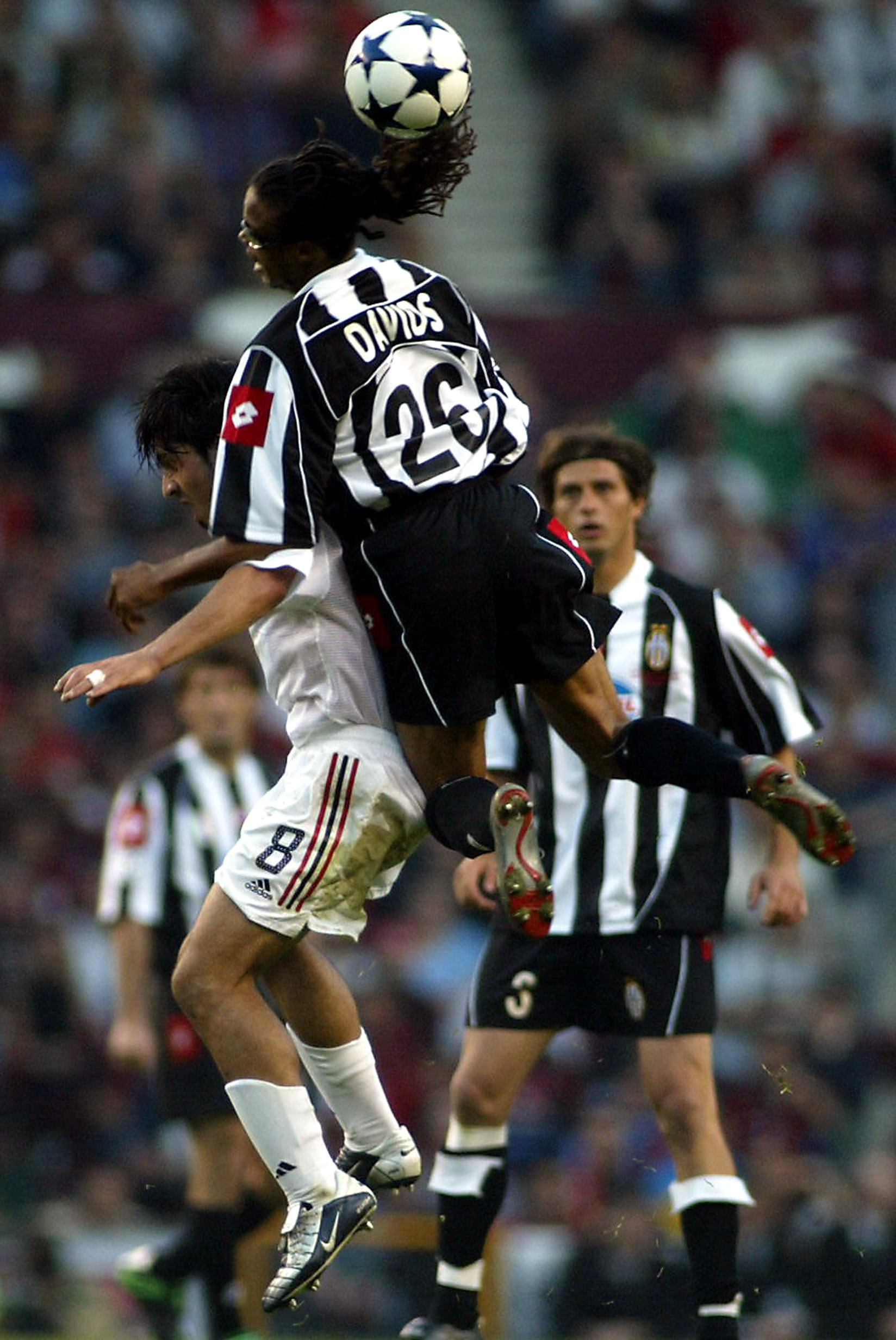
Juventus' Davids clashing with AC Milan's Gennaro Gattuso during the final of the UEFA Champions League on 28 May 2003

Moving onto the start of the 1996–97 season, Davids moved to Italy to play for AC Milan on a free transfer alongside team-mate Michael Reiziger, both early beneficiaries of the "Bosman ruling". In an unsuccessful season in which defending champions Milan changed their manager twice and finished 11th in Serie A, Davids broke his leg in a 1–0 defeat at Perugia on 23 February 1997. After failing to recover his place in the team he was allowed to join league rivals Juventus in December 1997 for a reduced 9 billion Italian lire (£3 million) transfer fee. At Milan, Davids had been one of the biggest disappointments of the first half of the Serie A season, his teammate Alessandro Costacurta was critical of his character, calling him the "rotten apple" of the dressing room.

At Juventus, he soon became a permanent first team member in the midfield, playing initially on the left flank, or later usually in the centre, as a defensive midfielder, forming a notable midfield partnership alongside French playmaker Zinedine Zidane; he was considered by pundits to be one of the best January transfers, while Juventus manager Marcello Lippi opined that Davids's new role within the team was one of the most important tactical changes of the season, along with the shift to a three–player defence and using Zidane in a more advanced role behind the strikers. Six successful years in Turin followed, with Davids helping the side to the Serie A title in 1998, 2002, and 2003, as well as two Supercoppa Italiana and the UEFA Intertoto Cup. Lippi once described him as "my one-man engine room".

Davids was often inspirational in Europe, playing 15 times as the club made it all the way to the 2002–03 Champions League final before losing to Milan on penalties. He had also previously managed to reach the Champions League final with Juventus in 1998, followed by a semi-final finish during the 1998–99 season, as well as reaching the 2002 Coppa Italia Final.

==== Barcelona (loan) ====
Following some tensions with Juventus manager Lippi, as well as competition from new arrivals for a starting spot at Juventus during the first half of the 2003-04 season, Davids joined Barcelona on loan in January 2004. Joining midway through a season where the club was struggling in mid-table and recently appointed manager Frank Rijkaard was under considerable pressure, Davids led Barça's successful resurgence of form which saw them finishing second to Valencia in La Liga. Davids' arrival has been cited as the catalyst for the Catalan club's dominance of Spanish and European football during the mid-to-late 2000s (decade), with Barcelona winning La Liga the following season (after five years without winning the league title) and a La Liga and Champions League double in 2005–06.

=== Inter Milan and Tottenham Hotspur ===
In the summer of 2004, Davids permanently moved on to Italian club Inter Milan on a three-year contract. When Inter terminated the remaining years of his contract in August 2005, he moved to England on a free transfer to play for Tottenham Hotspur. He had a successful stay at Tottenham and instantly became a fan favourite. His first and only goal was in a 2–1 away win against Wigan Athletic. Davids played for Spurs in the 2005–06 and the 2006–07 seasons, with the club finishing fifth in both seasons.

=== Return to Ajax ===
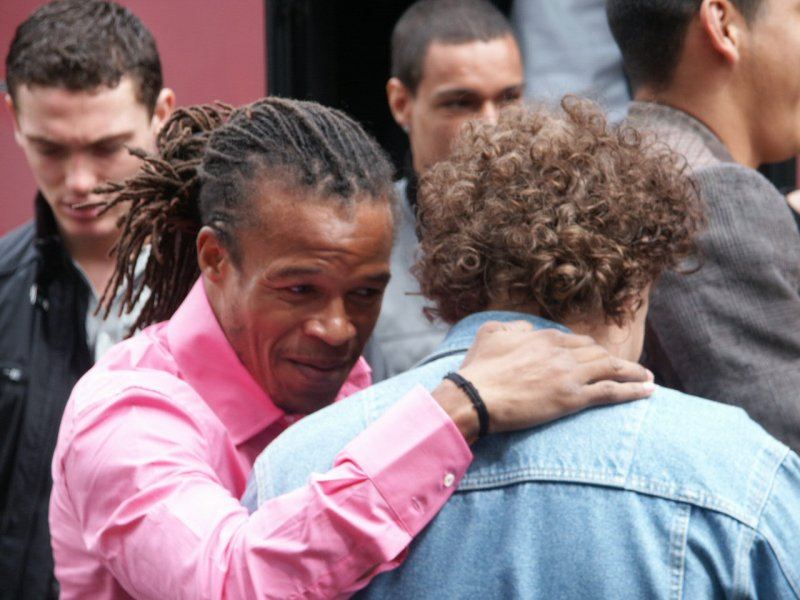
Davids embraces Ajax team manager David Endt during his second period at Ajax, with Thomas Vermaelen and Gregory van der Wiel behind.

Davids signed once more for Ajax on 28 January 2007 and played his first match against club rivals Feyenoord on 4 February. After the mid-season switch, Davids proved his value for the Ajax team again. He was one of the key midfielders in the run for the Dutch championship that was lost on one single goal to PSV on the final day of the league. He also played a major role in Ajax's cup campaign. He secured the KNVB Cup for Ajax by scoring the final penalty in a thrilling penalty shoot-out against AZ. Prior to the start of the 2007–08 season, Davids' leg was broken in a pre-season friendly against Go Ahead Eagles, sidelining him for around three months. In May 2008, Davids said he would leave Ajax when his contract expired on 30 June.

Davids played against the LA Galaxy on 6 December 2008 in an exhibition match held at Mount Smart Stadium in Auckland, New Zealand, as part of an Oceania XI All-Star team, despite the fact he is not from Oceania and has never played for an Oceanic club or national team. Davids was in contract negotiations with English Championship club Leicester City from 22 October 2009; however, he failed to make a decision for over a week and the club withdrew their offer on 30 October.

=== Crystal Palace ===
On 20 August 2010, Davids agreed a pay-as-you-play deal with English Championship club Crystal Palace. He made his debut on 24 August 2010 at left-back in the Second Round of the League Cup against Portsmouth. On 8 November 2010, he announced his departure from the club, stating it was "one of the greatest experiences of my life".

== International career ==
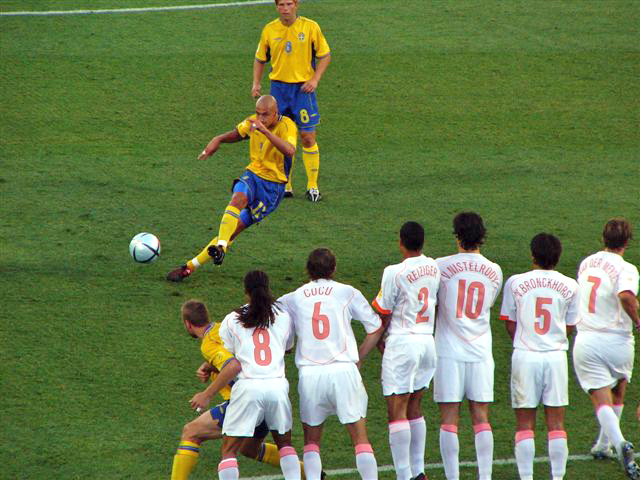
Davids (wearing No.8) in the Dutch wall, facing a free kick against Sweden at Euro 2004.

Davids made his debut for the Netherlands national team on 20 April 1994 in Tilburg, in a 1–0 defeat to the Republic of Ireland. He quickly became an integral part of the squad for the next decade, though he failed to win any major tournaments for the Oranje.

During UEFA Euro 1996, he was sent home by then manager Guus Hiddink for saying in a radio interview, "Hiddink should stop putting his head in some players' asses."

Nonetheless, Davids remained appreciated by Hiddink, who included him in the Dutch squad for the 1998 FIFA World Cup in France. Davids' most notable performance for the national team came in the second round match against FR Yugoslavia. He scored the winning goal in the last minute of the game and ensured that the Dutch team went through to the next round to meet Argentina. The Netherlands eventually finished fourth overall and Davids was named to the official FIFA "Team of the Tournament".

In 1999, Davids began wearing protective glasses following surgery in his right eye caused by glaucoma, which developed in 1995 following eye injuries. Davids first wore them on 4 September 1999 in a friendly match against Belgium. On 17 May 2001, Davids was suspended by FIFA when he tested positive for the banned anabolic steroid, nandrolone.

Davids played in Euro 2000, where the Netherlands reached the semi-finals before losing to Italy via penalty shootout. Davids was again named as part of the "Team of the Tournament".

During the Netherlands' Euro 2004 qualifying matches, Davids scored the Netherlands' first qualifying goal in their opening 3–0 victory against Belarus, and subsequently played in five of the remaining seven Group 3 fixtures and both legs of the play-off victory against Scotland.

After Euro 2004, new national team coach Marco van Basten appointed Davids as captain of the team. However, lack of first team football at his club Inter meant Davids lost his place in the national team in October 2004, thus losing the captain's armband in the process, which was later handed to goalkeeper Edwin van der Sar. In October 2005, during the latter stages of qualifying for the 2006 World Cup, Davids was recalled to the national team, though not as captain. He fell out of the picture again shortly after, thereby missing out on the Dutch squad for the World Cup.

== Style of play ==
Davids was a quick, hard-working team player, with power and pace, as well as physical strength and stamina in spite of his diminutive stature. He was known for his dynamic and combative style of play, tight marking of opponents, and ability to break down opposition plays as a defensive midfielder.

A well-rounded midfielder, Davids combined ball-winning ability with physical and athletic qualities. He was regarded as a technically skilled and creative player, noted for his technique, vision, acceleration, close control, quick footwork, and ball-juggling skills; his technical ability and prowess at street soccer and as a freestyle footballer earned him the nickname "The Mayor of the Street" in his youth.

Davids was also a powerful striker of the ball, as well as being an accurate passer and crosser with his excellent left foot, which enabled him to create chances for teammates after winning back possession, or help control the pace of games in midfield. His tactical intelligence, awareness, positioning, and ability to read the game, combined with his speed, energy, tackling, vision, and dribbling ability, allowed him to start counter-attacks after winning back possession and also enabled him to carry the ball forward, make attacking runs, and contribute to his team's offensive play by linking up the defence and the attack effectively. His versatility and wide range of skills thus enabled him to be deployed in several other midfield positions throughout his career; he was capable of playing as a left midfielder, or as a central or box-to-box midfielder, or even as a left back, and in his youth, was also deployed as an attacking midfielder, or as a second striker on occasion.

Regarded as one of the greatest midfielders of his generation, although he received acclaim for his playing ability and leadership as a footballer, Davids also gained a degree of infamy due to his strong character, temper, and outspokenness, which often led him to be involved in conflicts with his managers; he also struggled with injuries throughout his career. Due to his aggressive and hard-tackling playing style, Davids earned several nicknames throughout his career, such as "The Piranha", "Tubarão" (The Shark), and most notably, "The Pitbull". His Juventus manager Lippi once described him as his "one-man engine room." During his time in Italy, pundits likened him to his rival, Argentine holding midfielder Matías Almeyda, although Almeyda believed that Davids was more offensive-minded, while he instead preferred to focus on the defensive aspect of the game in order to support his more creative and offensive teammates.

== Media ==
Davids has appeared in commercials for the American sportswear company Nike. In 1996, he starred in a Nike commercial titled "Good vs Evil" in a gladiatorial game set in a Roman amphitheatre. Appearing alongside football players from around the world, including Ronaldo, Paolo Maldini, Eric Cantona, Patrick Kluivert, and Jorge Campos, they defend "the beautiful game" against a team of demonic warriors, before it culminates with Cantona striking the ball and destroying evil.

In a global Nike advertising campaign in the run-up to the 2002 World Cup in Korea and Japan, Davids starred in a "Secret Tournament" commercial (branded by Nike as "Scorpion KO") directed by Terry Gilliam, appearing alongside football players such as Thierry Henry, Ronaldinho, Francesco Totti, Luís Figo and Japanese star Hidetoshi Nakata, with former player Eric Cantona the tournament "referee".

Davids features in EA Sports' FIFA video game series, and was selected to appear on the cover of FIFA Football 2003 alongside Manchester United winger Ryan Giggs and Brazilian international Roberto Carlos. The online game League of Legends by Riot Games used Davids' likeness for a character skin called Striker Lucian without permission. Davids sued, and Dutch courts ruled that Riot Games must compensate Davids a percentage of their earnings from the skin.

== Coaching career ==
=== Ajax ===
In June 2011, Davids was elected to the new supervisory board at Ajax alongside Johan Cruyff.

=== Barnet ===
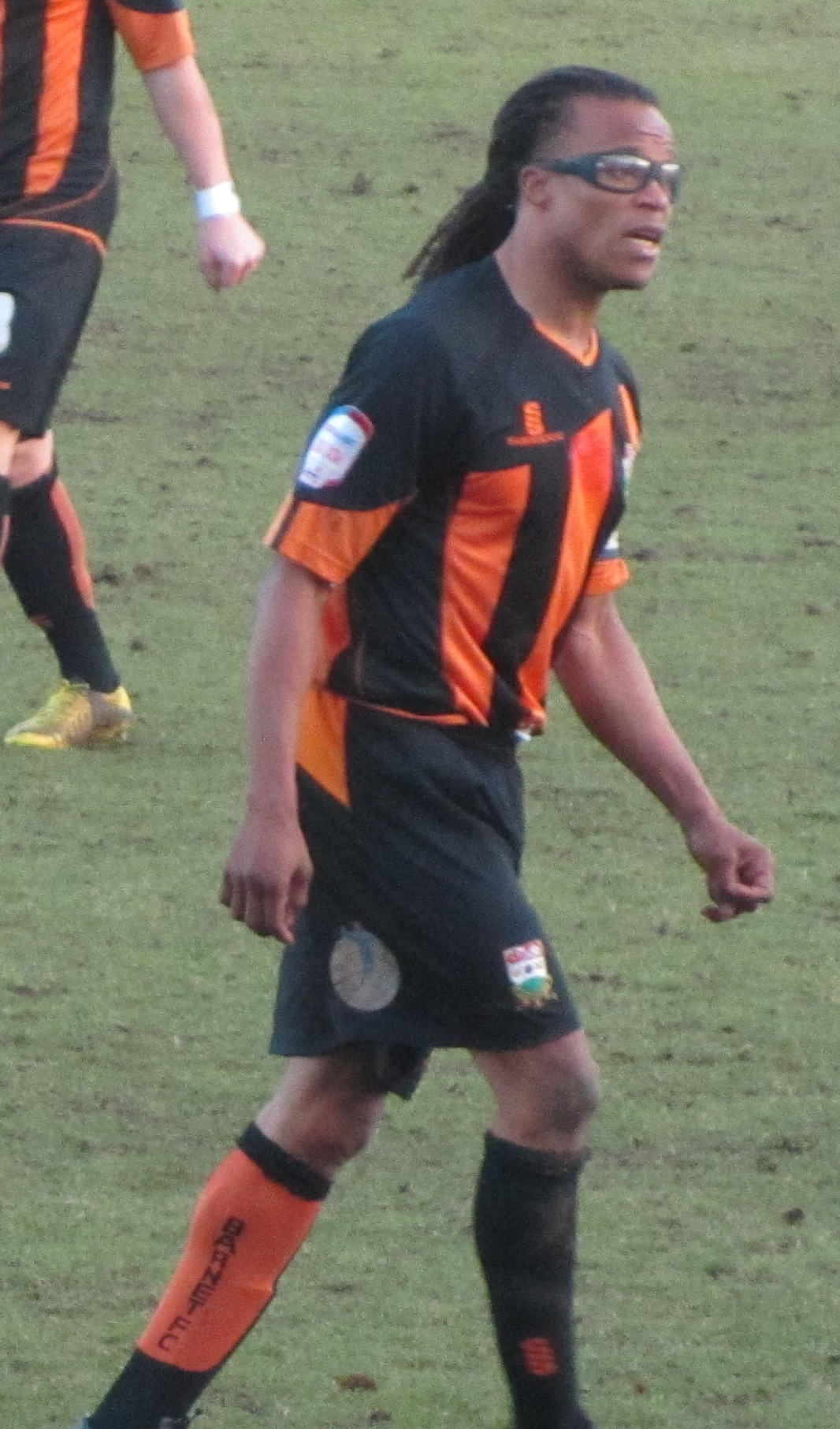
Davids playing for Barnet in 2013

Since 2010, Davids had been living in North London with his partner and had been participating in street football as well as managing Sunday league amateur side Brixton United. On 11 October 2012, Davids joined League Two side Barnet in a player-manager role, alongside Mark Robson. On his managerial debut, Barnet lost 4–1 at Underhill to Plymouth Argyle, with Davids leaving himself out of the squad. They followed this up with a 4–0 home win over Northampton Town where Davids played the full match, captaining the team and being voted Man of the Match. At the end of December 2012, following the departure of Robson, Davids took charge of the club by himself. Davids scored his first goal for Barnet in February 2013 in a 2–0 home victory over Southend United.

In March 2013, on the return journey from a defeat at Accrington Stanley, Davids sent the Barnet team coach back to pick up 36 supporters whose coach had broken down on the motorway and take them to the next service station.

Despite initially guiding Barnet off the foot of League Two, and lifting them out of the relegation zone, Barnet dropped back into the bottom two on the final day of the 2012–13 season, following a defeat to Northampton Town, and were relegated out of the Football League to the advantage of AFC Wimbledon who were able to escape by beating Fleetwood Town. On 21 May 2013, it was announced that Davids would remain in charge of Barnet for the club's 2013–14 Conference Premier season. In July 2013, Davids announced his decision to wear the number 1 shirt for the 2013–14 season, a shirt number traditionally worn by goalkeepers, saying that he intended to "set a trend" of midfielders wearing the number 1 shirt.

Discipline was a major problem for Davids in the 2013–14 season. He was booked in each of the first eight league games he played, and sent off in three of them. There was also controversy when it emerged that he would not attend away games that required an overnight stay, leaving assistant manager Ulrich Landvreugd to take charge. In December 2013, Davids considered retiring from football after being sent off for the third time in the season in Barnet's 2–1 defeat by Salisbury City.

Davids resigned from his post as manager on 18 January 2014.

In June 2014, Southern Counties East Football League side Greenwich Borough announced they were "in advanced talks" with Davids, with chairman Perry Skinner stating that he was "70% sure he'll come on board". The following month it was announced the club's attempt to sign Davids had been unsuccessful.

=== Telstar ===
In 2020, Davids was appointed as assistant coach of Dutch Eerste Divisie club Telstar.

=== Olhanense ===
On 4 January 2021, Davids was announced as the head coach of Portuguese side, Olhanense. He was sacked on 19 July 2021.

=== Netherlands ===
In May 2022, Davids became an assistant coach alongside Danny Blind for the Netherlands national team under Louis van Gaal for the 2022 FIFA World Cup.

== Personal life ==
Davids was engaged to fashion designer Olcay Gulsen in 2006, but they split in 2012. In 1999, Davids started his own Street Soccer brand called Monta Street.

Davids won a lawsuit filed in a Dutch court against League of Legends developer Riot Games for using his likeness in an in-game association football-themed skin for the champion Lucian without his permission.

== Career statistics ==
=== Club ===
Appearances and goals by club, season and competition
Club	Season	League			National cup (Note: Includes KNVB Cup, Coppa Italia, Copa del Rey, FA Cup)		League cup (Note: Includes Football League Cup)		Continental		Other		Total	
Club	Season	Division	Apps	Goals	Apps	Goals	Apps	Goals	Apps	Goals	Apps	Goals	Apps	Goals
Ajax	1991–92	Eredivisie	13	2	–		–		3 (Note: Appearances in UEFA Cup)	0	–		16	2
Ajax	1992–93	Eredivisie	28	4	5	5	–		8	3	–		41	12
Ajax	1993–94	Eredivisie	15	2	1	0	–		5 (Note: Appearances in European Cup Winners' Cup)	2	–		21	4
Ajax	1994–95	Eredivisie	22	5	2	0	–		7 (Note: Appearances in UEFA Champions League)	0	–		31	5
Ajax	1995–96	Eredivisie	28	7	6	0	–		11	1	3 (Note: One appearance in Dutch Supercup, one appearance in UEFA Super Cup, one appearance in Intercontinental Cup)	0	48	8
Ajax	Total		106	20	14	5	0	0	34	6	3	0	157	31
AC Milan	1996–97	Serie A	15	0	4	0	–		4	1	1 (Note: Appearance in Supercoppa Italiana)	0	24	1
AC Milan	1997–98	Serie A	4	0	2	0	–		–		–		6	0
AC Milan	Total		19	0	6	0	0	0	4	1	1	0	30	1
Juventus	1997–98	Serie A	20	2	3	0	–		5	0	–		28	2
Juventus	1998–99	Serie A	27	2	4	1	–		9	0	1	0	41	3
Juventus	1999–2000	Serie A	27	1	3	0	–		5	0	–		35	1
Juventus	2000–01	Serie A	26	1	1	0	–		5	0	–		32	1
Juventus	2001–02	Serie A	28	2	2	0	–		9	0	–		39	2
Juventus	2002–03	Serie A	26	1	0	0	–		15	1	0	0	41	2
Juventus	2003–04	Serie A	5	0	2	0	–		5	0	0	0	12	0
Juventus	Total		159	8	15	1	0	0	53	1	1	0	228	11
Barcelona	2003–04	La Liga	18	1	2	0	–		–		–		20	1
Inter Milan	2004–05	Serie A	14	0	4	0	–		5	0	–		23	0
Tottenham Hotspur	2005–06	Premier League	31	1	0	0	0	0	–		–		31	1
Tottenham Hotspur	2006–07	Premier League	9	0	0	0	3	0	1	0	–		13	0
Tottenham Hotspur	Total		40	1	0	0	3	0	1	0	0	0	44	1
Ajax	2006–07	Eredivisie	11	1	3	0	–		0	0	0	0	14	1
Ajax	2007–08	Eredivisie	14	0	0	0	–		0	0	0	0	14	0
Ajax	Total		25	1	3	0	0	0	0	0	0	0	31	1
Crystal Palace	2010–11	Championship	6	0	–		1	0	–		–		7	0
Barnet	2012–13	League Two	28	1	1	0	0	0	–		–		29	1
Barnet	2013–14	Conference Premier	8	0	1	0	0	0	–		1 (Note: Appearance in FA Trophy)	0	10	0
Barnet	Total		36	1	2	0	0	0	0	0	1	0	39	1
Total			423	32	46	6	4	0	97	8	6	0	576	47

=== International ===
Appearances and goals by national team and year
National team	Year	Apps	Goals
Netherlands	1994	1	0
Netherlands	1995	4	0
Netherlands	1996	4	0
Netherlands	1997	0	0
Netherlands	1998	11	1
Netherlands	1999	6	3
Netherlands	2000	12	0
Netherlands	2001	6	0
Netherlands	2002	6	2
Netherlands	2003	9	0
Netherlands	2004	14	0
Netherlands	2005	1	0
Total		74	6

Scores and results list the Netherlands goal tally first, score column indicates score after each Davids goal.

List of international goals scored by Edgar Davids
No.	Date	Venue	Opponent	Score	Result	Competition
1	29 June 1998	Stadium Municipal, Toulouse, France	(Serbia and Montenegro) FR Yugoslavia	2–1	2–1	1998 FIFA World Cup
2	31 March 1999	Amsterdam Arena, Amsterdam, Netherlands	Argentina	1–0	1–1	Friendly
3	4 September 1999	De Kuip, Rotterdam, Netherlands	Belgium	1–2	5–5	Friendly
4	4 September 1999	De Kuip, Rotterdam, Netherlands	Belgium	2–2	5–5	Friendly
5	21 August 2002	Ullevaal Stadion, Oslo, Norway	Norway	1–0	1–0	Friendly
6	7 September 2002	Philips Stadion, Eindhoven, Netherlands	Belarus	1–0	3–0	UEFA Euro 2004 qualifying

== Managerial statistics ==
As of 8 May 2021

Managerial record by team and tenure
Team	Nat	From	To	Record				
Team	Nat	From	To	P	W	D	L	Win %
Barnet	(England)	11 October 2012	18 January 2014	68	25	18	25	36.8
Olhanense	(Portugal)	4 January 2021	19 July 2021	18	8	5	5	44.4
Total				86	33	23	30	38.37

== Honours ==
Ajax

- Eredivisie: 1993–94, 1994–95, 1995–96
- KNVB Cup: 1992–93, 2006–07
- Johan Cruyff Shield: 1995
- UEFA Champions League: 1994–95
- UEFA Cup: 1991–92
- UEFA Super Cup: 1995
- Intercontinental Cup: 1995

Juventus

- Serie A: 1997–98, 2001–02, 2002–03
- Supercoppa Italiana: 2003
- UEFA Intertoto Cup: 1999
- UEFA Champions League runner-up: 1997–98, 2002–03

Inter Milan

- Coppa Italia: 2004–05

Netherlands

- FIFA World Cup fourth place: 1998
- UEFA European Championship third place: 2000, 2004

Individual

- KNVB Cup Golden Boot: 1992–93
- FIFA World Cup All-Star Team: 1998
- UEFA European Championship Team of the Tournament: 2000
- FIFA 100
- IFFHS Legends

== See also ==
- List of select Jewish football (association; soccer) players
