= Matteo Pelatti =

Italian footballer

Personal information
- Date of birth: 17 March 1978 (age 48)
- Place of birth: Scandiano, Italy
- Height: 1.83 m (6 ft 0 in)
- Position: Forward

Team information
- Current team: Formigine

Youth career
- Milan

Senior career*
Years	Team	Apps	(Gls)
1997–2000	Milan	2	(0)
1997–1998	→ Como (loan)	13	(2)
1998–2000	→ Brescello (loan)	45	(5)
2000	→ Sassuolo (loan)	13	(2)
2000–2001	Prato	30	(12)
2001–2003	Monza	37	(8)
2002	→ San Marino (loan)	13	(4)
2003–2004	Giulianova	27	(5)
2004–2005	Sanremese	31	(12)
2005–2007	Spezia	18	(5)
2006–2007	→ Sassuolo (loan)	18	(1)
2007–2008	Reggiana	21	(5)
2008–2009	Alessandria	22	(0)
2009–	Formigine	—	(—)
Total		290	(61)
- * Club domestic league appearances and goals

Matteo Pelatti (born 17 March 1978) is a former Italian professional footballer who played as a forward for Formigine of the Italian Serie D, the top level of the amateur league.

== Career ==
Pelatti played the last 2 games of 1996–97 Serie A season for AC Milan. Since age 19 he has left for 2 different Serie C1 club, Como and Brescello in temporary deal. He also spent 5 months for Sassuolo in the second half of 1999–2000 Serie C2. In June 2000 he left for Prato in co-ownership deal for a peppercorn fee, re-joining former teammate Simone Bonomi. Both players returned to Milan in June 2001 with Mirco Gasparetto moving to Prato for peppercorn fee as compensation. However, both players were re-sold back to Serie C1. Pelatti joined Monza in new co-ownership deal for 400 million lire (€206,583), as compensation for the return of Marko Topić. The club gave Monza another 50% of its registration rights in June 2002 for free. Since 2003 he has started his journeyman career, which changed his employer once a year until 2009. He left Spezia in temporary deal in 2006 after the club won promotion to Serie B as one of the champions of 2005–06 Serie C1. In 2007, he joined Reggiana along with Giuseppe Alessi, Vito Grieco and Paolo Ponzo. He settled in 2009 for Formigine in Eccellenza Emilia–Romagna, the top level of Emilia–Romagna regional football. He won promotion for the club in 2012 to Serie D, the interregional league and top level of non-professional football. He remained in the squad as one of the forward for 2012–13 Serie D season.

== Honours ==
Spezia

- Supercoppa di Serie C1: 2006
- Serie C1: 2006

Reggiana

- Supercoppa di Serie C2: 2008
- Serie C2: 2008

Formigine

- Eccellenza Emilia–Romagna: 2012
