= Winston Bogarde =

Dutch footballer (born 1970)

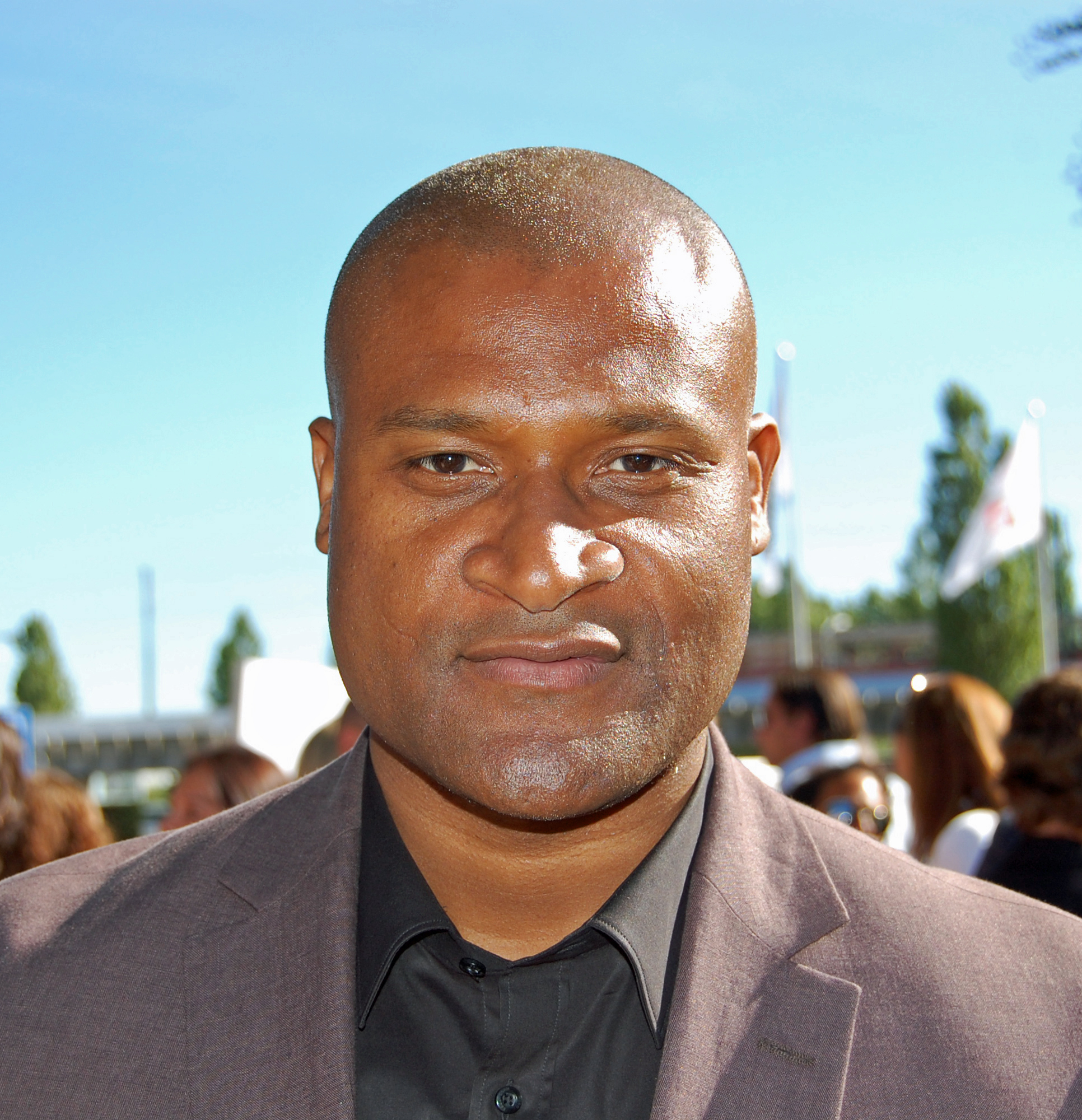
- Bogarde in 2017

Personal information
- Full name: Winston Lloyd Bogarde
- Date of birth: 22 October 1970 (age 56)
- Place of birth: Rotterdam, Netherlands
- Height: 1.93 m (6 ft 4 in)
- Positions: Centre-back; left-back

Youth career
- Alexandria '66
- Sparta Rotterdam

Senior career*
Years	Team	Apps	(Gls)
1988–1991	SVV	11	(1)
1990	→ Excelsior (loan)	10	(0)
1991–1994	Sparta Rotterdam	65	(14)
1994–1997	Ajax	62	(6)
1997	AC Milan	3	(0)
1998–2000	Barcelona	41	(4)
2000–2004	Chelsea	9	(0)
Total		201	(26)

International career
1995–2000	Netherlands	20	(0)

Managerial career
- 2017–2020: Jong Ajax (assistant)
- 2017: Jong Ajax (interim)
- 2020–2022: Ajax (assistant)
- 2026: Suriname (assistant)
- * Club domestic league appearances and goals

Winston Lloyd Bogarde (born 22 October 1970) is a Dutch retired professional footballer. He was known for his physical strength, and played mostly as a centre-back although he could occasionally play as left-back.

He had spells at Ajax, AC Milan, Barcelona and Chelsea. With the latter club he garnered worldwide attention when he received little playing time (no Premier League level appearances in his last three seasons combined), and nevertheless insisted on seeing out his lucrative contract.

Bogarde represented the Netherlands national team in one World Cup and one European Championship, being an international for five years.

== Club career ==
=== Early years and Ajax ===
Born in Rotterdam, Bogarde started his career at SVV in the Eerste Divisie, as a winger, then switched to the Eredivisie in summer 1991, playing with hometown club Sparta (he previously had a short loan spell with neighbouring Excelsior in the second division) and scoring a career-best 11 goals in the 1993–94 season as it qualified for the UEFA Intertoto Cup.

Bogarde signed for Ajax in 1994. After a slow first year – he did not leave the bench in the final of the team's victorious campaign in the UEFA Champions League – he became a defensive stalwart.

=== Milan and Barcelona ===
AC Milan signed Bogarde from Ajax for the 1997–98 season, but he only made three Serie A appearances throughout his short stay. In January 1998, he moved to compatriot Louis van Gaal's Barcelona, playing 19 matches in the second part of the campaign as Barcelona won a domestic double of La Liga and the Copa del Rey.

As the Dutch influence at Barcelona was reduced, so was Bogarde's, who only managed one league contest in his first full season, partly due to injuries, although he bounced back for a second respectable one (21 games, two goals).

=== Chelsea ===
Bogarde signed for Chelsea for the 2000–01 season, after following the advice of compatriot Mario Melchiot to join him at the Premier League side. He was signed when Gianluca Vialli was manager, although the latter had no idea the transfer was happening, it arguably being conducted by director of football Colin Hutchinson, with Emerson Thome, also a centre-back, shipped off to Sunderland; only weeks after arriving, newly appointed manager Claudio Ranieri wanted the player to leave.

According to Bogarde, it would be next to impossible to find a team that would offer him a contract comparable to the one he had at Chelsea: he was astounded at the salary the club had agreed on, as his value depreciated severely due to lack of first-team action, and decided to stay and honour his contract to the letter and appear for training every day, despite being only rarely selected to play. In the end, he only appeared 12 times during his four-year tenure, reportedly earning £40,000 a week during this period.

After playing as a substitute against Ipswich Town on Boxing Day 2000, Bogarde only played one more competitive match before his contract expired in July 2004, featuring from the bench, against Gillingham in the League Cup on 6 November 2002.

During his spell at Stamford Bridge, the club attempted to sell Bogarde due to his large salary, and demoted him to the reserve and youth teams in an effort to pressure him to leave. In response to concurrent UK press criticism, he said:

Why should I throw fifteen million euro away when it is already mine? At the moment I signed it was in fact my money, my contract. Both sides agreed wholeheartedly. I could go elsewhere to play for less, but you have to understand my history to understand I would never do that. I used to be poor as a kid, did not have anything to spend or something to play with. This world is about money, so when you are offered those millions you take them. Few people will ever earn so many. I am one of the few fortunates who do. I may be one of the worst buys in the history of the Premiership, but I don't care.

== International career ==
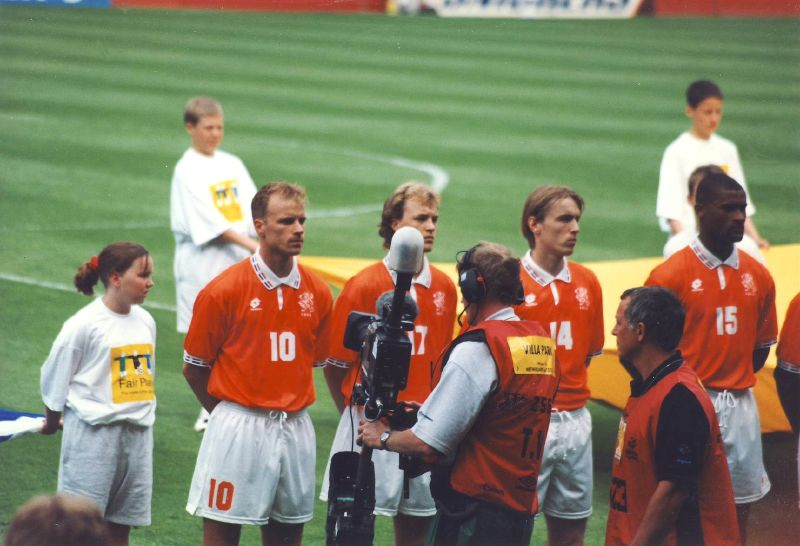
Bogarde (right) with Dennis Bergkamp, Jordi Cruyff and Richard Witschge at Euro 96.

Courtesy of steady performances at Ajax, Bogarde was summoned to UEFA Euro 1996 by Netherlands manager Guus Hiddink, who also included him in the squad for the 1998 FIFA World Cup. A starter in the first competition, he only backed up Arthur Numan in the second.

Bogarde had the chance to feature in his first start at a World Cup match against Brazil in the semi-finals, after starter Numan was suspended in the previous encounter against Argentina, but he sustained a serious shin injury during training and was hospitalised, being replaced by Philip Cocu.

== Coaching career ==
On 8 November 2005, 34-year-old Bogarde announced his retirement from professional football. He returned to Ajax in the summer of 2017, being named assistant manager at their reserves under former teammate Michael Reiziger. When the latter took interim charge of the first team following the dismissal of Marcel Keizer, Bogarde took the same role in the second team for a 7–0 home win over Volendam on 22 December 2017.

In March 2020, Bogarde was temporarily promoted to the first-team coaching staff by manager Erik ten Hag, as Christian Poulsen was absent due to possible contact with COVID-19; after the 3–1 win at Heerenveen, the upgrade was made permanent. In July, he was given a three-year contract in the role.

Bogarde was ousted by Ajax on 1 June 2022, with one year remaining on his contract with the national champions.

On 17 December 2025 it became clear that Winston Bogarde would assist Henk Ten Cate with the Suriname national football team. The goal was qualification for the 2026 FIFA World Cup for the first time in history.

== Personal life ==
Bogarde's nephews, Melayro and Lamare Bogarde, are both footballers and Dutch youth internationals.

== Honours ==
Ajax

- Eredivisie: 1994–95, 1995–96
- Dutch Supercup: 1995
- UEFA Champions League: 1994–95
- Intercontinental Cup: 1995
- UEFA Super Cup: 1995

Barcelona

- La Liga: 1997–98, 1998–99
- Copa del Rey: 1997–98
- UEFA Super Cup: 1997
