= Marko Topić =

Bosnian footballer (born 1976)

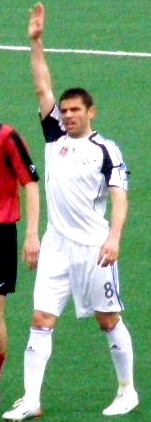
- Topić with Saturn Moscow Oblast

Personal information
- Date of birth: 1 January 1976 (age 50)
- Place of birth: Orašje, SFR Yugoslavia
- Height: 1.82 m (6 ft 0 in)
- Position: Forward

Senior career*
Years	Team	Apps	(Gls)
1994–1995	Croatia Zagreb	1	(0)
1995–1996	Sion	0	(0)
1996	FC Zürich	5	(0)
1997	FC Wil	0	(0)
1997–1998	Varteks	21	(7)
1998–2001	Monza	56	(11)
2000–2001	→ Austria Vienna (loan)	24	(6)
2001–2003	Energie Cottbus	58	(13)
2003–2004	VfL Wolfsburg	49	(3)
2004–2007	Krylia Sovetov Samara	61	(19)
2008–2010	Saturn Moscow Oblast	63	(17)
Total		338	(76)

International career
1997	Bosnia and Herzegovina U21	4	(0)
1997–2009	Bosnia and Herzegovina	24	(2)
- * Club domestic league appearances and goals

Marko Topić (born 1 January 1976) is a Bosnian former professional footballer who played as a forward. He represented Bosnia and Herzegovina internationally.

== Club career ==
Born in Orašje, Bosnia and Herzegovina, Yugoslavia, Topić started his professional career at post-war Croatia in 1994.

In 1998, he was signed by A.C. Milan but sent to Monza in co-ownership deal for 650 million lire (€335,697). He was bought back in June 2001 for 1 billion lire (€516,457). (Note: The fee was indirectly stated in page.42 of financial report of the year ended on 30 June 2001, which the difference between new market value of the retained half and the historic value was €181,000 (as co-ownership income). Therefore, €336,000 plus €181,000 equal €516,000. Using 1 euro = 1936.27 lire and reverting the round up to the nearest thousand euro to get the original value.) Monza also signed Matteo Pelatti for 400 million lire as compensation.

After Energie Cottbus relegated in 2003, he signed for VfL Wolfsburg.

== International career ==
Topić made his debut for Bosnia and Herzegovina in a November 1997 friendly match away against Tunisia and has earned a total of 24 caps, scoring 2 goals. His final international was a June 2009 friendly against Oman.

== Personal life ==
His family lives in Basel, Switzerland.

== Career statistics ==
Scores and results list Bosnia and Herzegovina's goal tally first.

Goal	Date	Venue	Opponent	Score	Result	Competition
1.	16 October 1998	Asim Ferhatović Hase, Sarajevo, Bosnia and Herzegovina	Czech Republic	1–2	1–3	UEFA Euro 2000 qualifying Group 9
2.	16 August 2000	Asim Ferhatović Hase, Sarajevo, Bosnia and Herzegovina	Turkey	2–0	2–0	Friendly
