= Vincenzo Maiolo =

Italian footballer

Personal information
- Full name: Vincenzo Maiolo
- Date of birth: 15 September 1978 (age 48)
- Place of birth: Varese, Italy
- Height: 1.82 m (5 ft 11 1/2 in)
- Position: Forward

Youth career
- Milan

Senior career*
| Years | Team | Apps | (Gls) |
| 1996–97 | Milan | 0 | (0) |
| 1997–99 | Pro Sesto | 58 | (21) |
| 1999–00 | Livorno | 5 | (0) |
| 2000–01 | Pro Sesto | 39 | (17) |
| 2001 | Campobasso | 3 | (0) |
| 2001–02 | Prato | 21 | (10) |
| 2002–05 | Pro Sesto | 90 | (40) |
| 2005–06 | Legnano | 3 | (1) |
| 2006–07 | Como | 9 | (0) |
| 2008–09 | Olimpia Ponte Tresa | 21 | (12) |
| 2009 | Gallaratese | | |
- * Club domestic league appearances and goals

Vincenzo Maiolo (born 15 September 1978 in Varese, Lombardy) is an Italian former footballer, who played as a forward.

== Career ==
After growing up in the A.C. Milan youth system, Maiolo was promoted to the senior side under manager Fabio Capello, and later made his professional debut and only appearance for the club in the Coppa Italia the following season, on 23 October 1996, in a 2–0 away win over Reggiana; however, he did not make a single league appearance for the club during the 1996–97 season.

Due to his inconsistency, behavioural issues, and recurring injury troubles, which also affected his fitness, he never made his Serie A debut. He spent the remainder of his career in the lower Italian divisions, playing for Italian clubs: Pro Sesto (1997–99; 2000–01; 2002–05) in Serie C2, Livorno (1999–2000) in Serie C1, Campobasso (2001) in Serie C2, Prato (2001–02) in Serie C2, Legnano, first in Serie C2 (2005–06), and later in the Amateur divisions (2011–12), and Como (2006–07) in Serie D; following the bankruptcy of Italian club Olimpia Ponte Tresa, and their subsequent re-founding in the Amateur divisions of Italian football, he went on to play in the Amateur divisions himself, first with Olimpia Ponte Presa, (2008–09; 2010–11), then with Gallaratese (2009), and finally with his former club Legnano (2011–12).

== Style of play ==
Initially regarded as a promising forward in his youth, who was capable of playing both as a striker or as creative forward, Maiolo possessed good feet and an eye for goal, and was also an accurate free-kick taker, whose technique was inspired by Roberto Baggio during their time at Milan together; he was also an accurate penalty taker, and was capable of both scoring goals himself, and providing assists for team-mates. Despite his talent, his career was marred by injuries, inconsistency, and behavioural problems, which affected his fitness.

== Honours ==
=== Club ===
Prato

- Serie C2: 2001–02

Pro Sesto

- Serie C2: 2004–05

=== Individual ===
- Serie C2 Top-scorer: 2002–03
