= Massimo Minetti =

Italian footballer

Personal information
- Date of birth: 11 April 1978 (age 48)
- Place of birth: Genoa, Italy
- Height: 1.75 m (5 ft 9 in)
- Position: Forward

Senior career*
Years	Team	Apps	(Gls)
1996–1998	Reggiana	118	(18)
1998	→ Fidelis Andria (loan)	13	(0)
1999	→ Brescello (loan)	9	(1)
2000	→ Sanremese (loan)	12	(2)
2003	Treviso	8	(0)
2004	Pisa	8	(0)
2004–2005	Reggiana	29	(2)
2005–2006	Genoa	7	(0)
2006	→ Sassari Torres (loan)	15	(1)
2006–2007	Messina	2	(0)
2008	Verona	11	(2)
2009	Como	9	(0)
- * Club domestic league appearances and goals

Massimo Minetti (born 11 April 1978) is an Italian former footballer who played as a forward. Minetti played over 100 games in Serie C1.
