= Matteo Placida =

Italian footballer

Personal information
- Date of birth: August 22, 1978 (age 48)
- Place of birth: Lecco, Italy
- Height: 1.84 m (6 ft 1/2 in)
- Position: Defender

Senior career*
Years	Team	Apps	(Gls)
1995–1998	Milan	0	(0)
1997	→ Monza (loan)	1	(0)
1997–1998	→ Prato (loan)	7	(0)
1998–1999	Pro Sesto	25	(0)
1999–2002	Novara	74	(0)
2002–2003	Örebro		
2003–2004	Canzese	19	(0)
2004–2006	Pergocrema	66	(3)
2006–2007	Como	13	(0)
2007	Salò	1	(0)
2007–2008	Rivoli	28	(8)
2008–2009	Lavagnese	16	(0)
2009–2010	Olginatese	26	(1)
2010	Caratese	13	(0)
2010–2011	Caronnese	4	(0)
2011–2012	Cittanova Interpiana	8	(0)
2012–2013	Civitavecchia	23	(0)

International career
1996	Italy U18	1	(0)
- * Club domestic league appearances and goals

Matteo Placida (born August 22, 1978) is an Italian former professional footballer who played as a defender. He made 120 appearances in the Italian professional leagues and had a lengthy career in the lower divisions. In international football, he represented Italy at under-18 level.
