= Nicola Corrent =

Italian footballer

Personal information
- Date of birth: 29 March 1979 (age 47)
- Place of birth: Verona, Italy
- Height: 1.78 m (5 ft 10 in)
- Position: Midfielder

Youth career
- 1996–1998: A.C. Milan

Senior career*
Years	Team	Apps	(Gls)
1998–1999	A.C. Milan	0	(0)
1998–1999	→ Monza (loan)	25	(0)
1999–2001	Salernitana	43	(0)
2001	→ Siena (loan)	13	(0)
2001–2003	Como	47	(2)
2003–2004	Modena	3	(0)
2004–2007	Ternana	34	(2)
2004–2005	→ Napoli (loan)	27	(1)
2007–2009	Verona	62	(2)
2009–2010	Lecco	23	(5)
2010–2013	Carrarese	81	(8)

International career
1997	Italy U-17	5	(0)
1997	Italy U-18	6	(0)
1998–2000	Italy U-20	9	(0)
2000–2001	Italy U-21	10	(1)

Managerial career
- 2018–2019: Hellas Verona (U17)
- 2019–2022: Hellas Verona (U19)
- 2022–2023: Mantova
- * Club domestic league appearances and goals

Nicola Corrent (born 29 March 1979) is an Italian football coach and a former player who played as a midfielder. He was most recently the head coach of Mantova.

== Playing career ==
Corrent started his professional career at A.C. Milan. He was signed by Salernitana in co-ownership deal in 1999, for 1 billion lire (€516,457). Milan bought back Corrent from Salernitana in March 2001 for the same fee. In 2001, he was signed by newly promoted Serie B team Como, from Milan in a new co-ownership deal, for about 1.125 billion lire (€581 thousand). The club were then promoted to Serie A. In June 2003 Como acquired him outright for another €581,119. In summer 2003 Corrent, Riccardo Allegretti, Vedin Musić and Cristian Stellini joined Modena for a total of €1.32 million (€330,000 each).

He then went to Ternana in 2004. The team relegated to Serie C1 in summer 2006. Corrent was excluded from the squad as a discipline measure. In January 2007, he was signed by Verona of Serie B, to help the club avoid relegation, but failed. He was the captain of the team before he left for Lecco on free transfer.

In summer 2010 he joined Carrarese.

In July 2011 Corrent renewed his contract with Carrarese until 30 June 2013. Corrent, which served as the captain of the team, later extended the contract to last until 30 June 2014.

On 20 July 2013 Corrent was asked by Carrarese to terminate the contract. On 13 August 2013 an agreement was formed to end the contract in mutual consent.

== Coaching career ==
On 30 May 2022, after having worked as a youth coach for Verona for a number of years, Corrent was appointed head coach of Serie C club Mantova for the 2022–23 season. He was dismissed on 20 February 2023.
