= Carlo Nervo =

Italian footballer (born 1971)

Personal information
- Date of birth: 29 October 1971 (age 55)
- Place of birth: Vicenza, Italy
- Height: 1.80 m (5 ft 11 in)
- Position: Winger

Youth career
- Bassano Virtus

Senior career*
Years	Team	Apps	(Gls)
1988–1989	Bassano Virtus	31	(5)
1989–1990	Monza	0	(0)
1990–1991	Bassano Virtus	29	(3)
1991–1992	Cittadella	31	(3)
1992–1994	Mantova	62	(8)
1994–2005	Bologna	311	(34)
2005–2006	Catanzaro	18	(0)
2006–2007	Bologna	26	(2)
2008	Virgilio		
2008–2009	Rolo		

International career
2002–2004	Italy	6	(0)
- * Club domestic league appearances and goals

Carlo Nervo (Italian pronunciation: [ˈkarlo ˈnɛrvo]; born 29 October 1971) is an Italian former professional footballer who usually played as a wide midfielder on the right flank. Following his retirement, he began a career in politics.

== Club career ==
Originally from Solagna, Nervo began his career with the G.S.R. Solagna Youth System, before moving to Bassano Virtus, where he made his professional debut in 1988 after developing further in the club's Youth System. After brief periods with Monza and Cittadella, he moved to Mantova in 1992, spending two seasons with the club, helping the club to the Serie C2 title in his first season, and earning promotion to Serie C1.

In 1994, Nervo was signed by Bologna, the club with which he would spend most of his career; in total, he remained at the club for 13 seasons in total, 11 of which were consecutive, making 337 league appearances for the club between Serie A, Serie B, and Serie C1, while scoring a total of 36 goals; he made his debut with Bologna during the 1994–95 season, and demonstrated his adeptness as a right winger due to his pace, work-rate, skill, creativity, and eye for goal, which enabled him to form several notable partnerships on the pitch with strikers such as Igor Kolyvanov and Giuseppe Signori. Nervo played a key role in helping Bologna win consecutive Serie C1 and Serie B titles, also gaining Serie A promotion with the club, and he made his Serie A debut on 7 September 1996, in a 1–0 home win over Lazio; he made his 100th Serie A appearance with Bologna in a 0–0 away draw against Verona on 5 March 2000. During his time with the club, he helped Bologna to qualify for the UEFA Cup, after winning the 1998 UEFA Intertoto Cup; Bologna reached the semifinals of both the 1998–99 UEFA Cup and the 1998–99 Coppa Italia the following season. Following Bologna's relegation to Serie B at the conclusion of the 2004–05 Serie A season and the expiration of his contract with the club, Nervo spent a brief stint on loan with fellow Serie B side Catanzaro during the 2005–06 season, but later returned to Bologna in January 2006, and finished his professional career with the club at the conclusion of the 2006–07 season, retiring in 2007. With 417 appearances in official competitions with Bologna, he is the club's third highest appearance holder, behind Giacomo Bulgarelli and Tazio Roversi.

In February 2008, Nervo came out of retirement to play football in the lower divisions, for Virgilio, and Padania. During the 2008–09 season, he played with Rolo, officially retiring from football at the end of the season.

== International career ==
Nervo also played for the Italy national side, making six appearances under manager Giovanni Trapattoni between 2002 and 2004. He made his international debut in a friendly match on 20 November 2002, in a 1–1 home draw against Turkey, in Pescara.

== Style of play ==
Nervo usually played as a right winger, and was known for his pace, work-rate, dribbling skills, creativity, eye for goal, and ability to provide precise assists for teammates from crosses. Although he usually played as a midfielder, he was also capable of playing as a forward, or as a defender.

== Outside of football ==
=== Politics ===
Following his retirement from football, Nervo pursued a career in politics; he is a member of the controversial right-wing Padanian separatist party Lega Nord. On 7 June 2009, he was elected the mayor of Solagna, in the province of Vicenza.

=== Business ===
After his political career, Nervo started a family furniture business.

== Honours ==
Mantova

- Serie C2: 1992–93

Bologna

- Serie C1: 1994–95
- Serie B: 1995–96
- UEFA Intertoto Cup: 1998
