= Mirco Gasparetto =

Italian footballer

Personal information
- Date of birth: 2 February 1980 (age 46)
- Place of birth: Asolo, Italy
- Height: 1.88 m (6 ft 2 in)
- Position: Forward

Team information
- Current team: Italy U19 (assistant coach)

Youth career
- –1999: Milan

Senior career*
Years	Team	Apps	(Gls)
1999–2002	Milan	0	(0)
1999–2001	→ Padova (loan)	56	(12)
2001–2002	→ Varese (loan)	22	(2)
2002–2003	Prato	30	(20)
2003–2007	Empoli	64	(2)
2006	→ Mantova (loan)	14	(2)
2007	Genoa	21	(6)
2007–2011	Chievo	22	(0)
2008–2009	→ Pisa (loan)	36	(4)
2010	→ Padova (loan)	7	(0)
2011	→ Cremonese (loan)	9	(0)
2011–2012	Lumezzane	30	(5)
2012–2013	Real Vicenza	23	(5)
2013–2014	Villafranca		

International career
1998	Italy U18 (Note: the under-17 team at that time equivalent to modern day under-18 team. Gasparetto had 3 caps for 17 team at that time.)	3	(0)

Managerial career
- 2014: Lumezzane (assistant)
- 2015: Lumezzane (assistant)
- 2015–2016: Lumezzane (assistant)
- 2016–2017: Italy U18 (assistant)
- 2017–2018: Italy U19 (assistant)
- 2018–2019: Italy U20 (assistant)
- 2019–2023: Italy U21 (assistant)
- 2023–: Italy U19 (assistant)
- * Club domestic league appearances and goals

Mirco Gasparetto (born 2 February 1980) is an Italian football coach and a former forward. He is an assistant coach with the Italy national under-19 football team.

Gasparetto has played over 100 matches in Serie B. Although contracted for by then Serie A clubs Empoli, Genoa and Chievo, he played very few match in the Italian top division.

== Football career ==
=== Early career ===
Born in Asolo, Veneto, Gasparetto started his career at A.C. Milan, club giant of Lombardy. In 1999–2000 season, he left for Serie C2 club Padova on loan, stayed for 2 seasons. He then left for Varese of Serie C1. In 2002, he was signed by Prato in co-ownership deal for a peppercorn fee. He scored a career high of 20 goals, and secured a move to Serie A club Empoli.

=== Empoli ===
Although Gasparetto failed to play as the regular starter, Empoli bought all remain registration rights from Milan in June 2005. After just played 6 times in 2005–06 season, he left for Mantova on loan with option to purchase. In the next season, he left for Genoa on loan for €75,000 with option to purchase, while he scored 6 goals, behind Adaílton (11 goals) Marco Di Vaio (9 goals) and the same as Giuseppe Greco.

=== Chievo ===
Genoa choose to purchase Gasparetto at the end of season, for €500,000 in co-ownership deal. He played the opening match for Genoa, but on 31 August 2007, he was transferred to Chievo of Serie B re-joining Greco. Gasparetto was valued €1.8 million, while €900,000 of them was received by Empoli.

After Chievo promoted to Serie A, he was sent back to Serie B for Pisa. In January 2010, he was loaned to Padova of Serie B after not played in the first half of 2009–10 season. In January 2011 he was signed by Cremonese.

=== Lumezzane ===
In summer 2011 Gasparetto was signed by Lumezzane for free.
