= 1996–97 Serie A =

95th season of top-tier Italian football

Serie A
- Season: 1996–97
- Dates: 7 September 1996 – 1 June 1997
- Champions: Juventus; 24th title
- Relegated: Cagliari; Perugia; Verona; Reggiana
- Champions League: Juventus; Parma
- Cup Winners' Cup: Vicenza
- UEFA Cup: Internazionale; Lazio; Udinese; Sampdoria
- Matches: 306
- Goals: 810 (2.65 per match)
- Top goalscorer: Filippo Inzaghi (24 goals)

Serie A 1996-97 team distribution

The 1996–97 Serie A title was won by Juventus, under head coach Marcello Lippi. Cagliari, Perugia, Hellas Verona and Reggiana were relegated.

== Teams ==
Bologna, Hellas Verona, Perugia and Reggiana had been promoted from Serie B.

== Events ==
Following the historical change of the UEFA Champions League entry list, Italy obtained a seventh place in Europe.

== Personnel and Sponsoring ==
Team	Head Coach	Kit manufacturer	Shirt sponsor
Atalanta	(Italy) Emiliano Mondonico	Asics	Somet
Bologna	(Italy) Renzo Ulivieri	Diadora	Carisbo
Cagliari	(Italy) Carlo Mazzone	Reebok	Pecorino Sardo
Fiorentina	(Italy) Claudio Ranieri	Reebok	Sammontana
Internazionale	(Italy) Luciano Castellani	Umbro	Pirelli
Juventus	(Italy) Marcello Lippi	Kappa	Sony
Lazio	(Italy) Dino Zoff	Umbro	Cirio
Milan	(Italy) Arrigo Sacchi	Lotto	Opel
Napoli	(Italy) Vincenzo Montefusco	Lotto	Centrale del latte di Napoli
Parma	(Italy) Carlo Ancelotti	Puma	Parmalat
Perugia	(Italy) Nevio Scala	Galex	CEPU
Piacenza	(Italy) Bortolo Mutti	ABM	Caripiacenza
Reggiana	(Italy) Francesco Oddo	Asics	Burro Giglio
Roma	(Sweden) Nils Liedholm	Diadora	INA Assitalia
Sampdoria	(Sweden) Sven-Göran Eriksson	Asics	None
Udinese	(Italy) Alberto Zaccheroni	Hummel	Millionaire Market
Hellas Verona	(Italy) Luigi Cagni	Erreà	Ferroli
Vicenza	(Italy) Francesco Guidolin	Biemme	Pal Zileri

== League table ==
Pos	Team	Pld	W	D	L	GF	GA	GD	Pts	Qualification or relegation
1	Juventus (C)	34	17	14	3	51	24	+27	65	Qualified to Champions League group stage
2	Parma	34	18	9	7	41	26	+15	63	Qualified to Champions League qualifying round
3	Internazionale	34	15	14	5	51	35	+16	59	Qualification to UEFA Cup
4	Lazio	34	15	10	9	54	37	+17	55	Qualification to UEFA Cup
5	Udinese	34	15	9	10	53	41	+12	54	Qualification to UEFA Cup
6	Sampdoria	34	14	11	9	60	46	+14	53	Qualification to UEFA Cup
7	Bologna	34	13	10	11	50	44	+6	49	
8	Vicenza	34	12	11	11	43	38	+5	47	Qualification to Cup Winners' Cup
9	Fiorentina	34	10	15	9	46	41	+5	45	
10	Atalanta	34	11	11	12	44	46	−2	44	
11	Milan	34	11	10	13	43	45	−2	43	
12	Roma	34	10	11	13	46	47	−1	41 (Note: Roma finished ahead of Napoli on Goal difference: Roma -1, Napoli -7.)	
13	Napoli	34	9	14	11	38	45	−7	41	
14	Piacenza	34	7	16	11	29	45	−16	37 (Note: CAG: 7 pts; PIA: 5 pts; PER: 4 pts.)	Relegation tie-breaker
15	Cagliari (R)	34	9	10	15	45	55	−10	37	Serie B after tie-breaker
16	Perugia (R)	34	10	7	17	48	62	−14	37 (Note: Relegated to 1997-98 Serie B for direct matches.)	Relegation to Serie B
17	Hellas Verona (R)	34	6	9	19	38	64	−26	27	Relegation to Serie B
18	Reggiana (R)	34	2	13	19	28	67	−39	19	Relegation to Serie B

Source: Serie A, RSSSF.com, Soccerway
Rules for classification: 1) Points; 2) Head-to-head points; 3) Head-to-head goal difference; 4) Goal difference; 5) Goals scored; 6) Draw. (Note: Head-to-head record is used only after all the matches between the teams in question have been played).
(C) Champions; (R) Relegated

== Results ==
Home \ Away	ATA	BOL	CAG	FIO	INT	JUV	LAZ	MIL	NAP	PAR	PER	PIA	REA	ROM	SAM	UDI	HEL	VIC
Atalanta		1–1	4–1	2–2	1–1	1–1	2–1	0–2	2–2	1–2	2–2	4–0	1–0	0–4	4–0	1–0	1–0	3–1
Bologna	3–1		3–0	0–2	2–2	0–1	1–0	1–2	2–1	0–1	0–0	1–1	3–2	3–2	2–1	0–0	6–1	0–0
Cagliari	2–0	2–2		4–1	1–2	0–0	0–0	1–1	1–1	0–1	2–1	1–0	1–1	2–1	3–4	1–2	3–2	2–1
Fiorentina	0–0	3–2	2–0		0–0	1–1	0–0	1–0	3–0	1–0	4–1	1–1	3–0	2–1	1–1	2–3	2–0	2–4
Internazionale	2–0	0–2	2–2	2–2		0–0	1–1	3–1	3–2	3–1	1–0	2–0	3–1	3–1	3–4	1–1	2–1	0–1
Juventus	0–0	1–0	2–1	1–0	2–0		2–2	0–0	1–1	1–1	2–1	4–1	3–1	3–0	0–0	0–3	3–2	2–0
Lazio	3–2	1–2	2–1	1–0	2–2	0–2		3–0	3–2	2–1	4–1	2–0	6–1	0–0	1–1	0–1	4–1	0–2
Milan	1–1	2–0	0–1	2–0	1–1	1–6	2–2		3–1	0–1	3–0	0–0	3–1	1–1	2–3	2–1	4–1	1–0
Napoli	0–1	3–2	1–1	2–2	1–2	0–0	1–0	0–0		2–1	4–2	1–1	1–0	1–0	1–1	1–1	1–0	1–0
Parma	0–0	1–0	3–2	0–0	1–0	1–0	2–0	1–1	3–0		1–2	1–0	3–2	0–0	3–0	0–2	1–0	3–0
Perugia	3–1	5–1	3–2	1–1	0–0	1–2	1–2	1–0	1–1	1–2		1–1	1–3	2–0	1–0	2–1	3–1	1–1
Piacenza	3–1	1–1	1–1	1–1	0–3	1–1	1–3	3–2	1–0	0–0	2–1		3–0	0–0	2–2	0–0	2–0	1–0
Reggiana	0–3	1–3	0–3	0–0	1–1	1–1	0–2	0–3	1–1	0–0	1–4	0–0		1–1	1–1	0–0	2–2	0–0
Roma	0–2	1–1	3–1	3–3	1–1	1–1	1–1	3–0	1–0	0–1	4–1	3–1	2–2		1–4	0–3	4–3	2–0
Sampdoria	2–0	1–2	4–1	1–1	1–2	0–1	1–0	2–1	0–1	1–1	5–2	3–0	3–0	1–2		4–0	0–0	2–1
Udinese	2–0	2–2	1–0	2–0	0–1	1–4	2–3	1–1	2–2	3–1	2–1	4–0	2–1	1–0	4–5		3–0	1–1
Hellas Verona	1–1	0–2	2–2	2–1	0–1	0–2	1–1	3–1	2–0	1–2	2–0	0–0	2–4	2–1	1–1	3–2		2–2
Vicenza	4–1	2–0	2–0	3–2	1–1	2–1	0–2	2–0	2–2	1–1	4–1 (Note: The match was played at Stadio Giglio.)	1–1	2–0	0–2	1–1	2–0	0–0	

Source: lega-calcio.it (in Italian)
Legend: Blue = home team win; Yellow = draw; Red = away team win.

== Relegation tie-breaker ==
15 June 1997

Cagliari	1–3	Piacenza
Tovalieri 65'	Report	Luiso 5', 90+1'; Berretta 38' (o.g.)

Stadio San Paolo, Naples
Attendance: 25,000
Referee: Stefano Braschi (Prato)

Cagliari relegated to 1997-98 Serie B.

== Top goalscorers ==
Rank	Player	Club	Goals
1	(Italy) Filippo Inzaghi	Atalanta	24
2	(Italy) Vincenzo Montella	Sampdoria	22
3	(Argentina) Abel Balbo	Roma	17
4	(Italy) Sandro Tovalieri	Reggiana, Cagliari	16
5	(Italy) Roberto Mancini	Sampdoria	15
5	(Italy) Marco Negri	Perugia	15
5	(Italy) Giuseppe Signori	Lazio	15
8	(Italy) Enrico Chiesa	Parma	14
8	(France) Youri Djorkaeff	Internazionale	14
8	(Italy) Pasquale Luiso	Piacenza	14

== Attendances ==
#	Club	Avg. attendance
1	AC Milan	55,894
2	Internazionale	50,806
3	AS Roma	50,557
4	SSC Napoli	45,253
5	Juventus FC	39,271
6	SS Lazio	38,699
7	ACF Fiorentina	36,991
8	Bologna FC	27,922
9	UC Sampdoria	26,187
10	Parma AC	22,601
11	AC Perugia	20,580
12	Hellas Verona	20,456
13	Atalanta BC	19,030
14	Cagliari Calcio	18,172
15	Udinese Calcio	16,790
16	Vicenza Calcio	15,962
17	AC Reggiana	13,617
18	Piacenza Calcio	11,785

== References and sources ==
- Almanacco Illustrato del Calcio - La Storia 1898-2004, Panini Edizioni, Modena, September 2005
