= 1994–95 Parma AC season =

Parma
1994–95 season
- Owner: Parmalat
- President: Giorgio Pedraneschi
- Manager: Nevio Scala
- Stadium: Stadio Ennio Tardini
- Serie A: 2nd
- Coppa Italia: Runners-up
- UEFA Cup: Winners
- Top goalscorer: League: Zola (19); All: Zola (28)
Home colours	Away colours

Parma Associazione Calcio had one of its most successful seasons ever, thanks to a third-place finish in Serie A with the same points as runner-up Lazio, plus a victory against Juventus in the UEFA Cup Final. It also reached the Coppa Italia Final, where they were defeated by Juventus.

== Squad ==
Note: Flags indicate national team as defined under FIFA eligibility rules; some limited exceptions apply. Players may hold more than one non-FIFA nationality.

Pos.	Nation	Player
GK	ITA	Luca Bucci
GK	ITA	Giovanni Galli
GK	ITA	Rocco Bachini
DF	ITA	Antonio Benarrivo
DF	ITA	Luigi Apolloni
DF	ITA	Lorenzo Minotti
DF	ITA	Alberto Di Chiara
DF	POR	Fernando Couto
DF	ARG	Roberto Sensini
DF	ITA	Massimo Susic
DF	ITA	Roberto Mussi
DF	ITA	Marcello Castellini
DF	ITA	Diego Pellegrini

Pos.	Nation	Player
DF	ITA	Gianfranco Cicarti
MF	ITA	Massimo Crippa
MF	ITA	Dino Baggio
MF	ITA	Stefano Fiore
MF	ITA	Gabriele Pin
MF	SWE	Tomas Brolin
MF	ITA	Mario Caruso
MF	ITA	Roberto Magnani
FW	COL	Faustino Asprilla
FW	ITA	Gianfranco Zola
FW	ITA	Marco Branca

=== Transfers ===
In
Pos.	Name	from	Type
MF	Dino Baggio	Juventus	
DF	Fernando Couto	FC Porto	
FW	Marco Branca	Udinese	
DF	Roberto Mussi	Torino	
GK	Giovanni Galli	Torino	
DF	Massimo Susic	Pisa	
DF	Marcello Castellini	Perugia	
DF	Diego Pellegrini	Vicenza	
MF	Stefano Fiore	Cosenza	

Out
Pos.	Name	from	Type
FW	Alessandro Melli	Sampdoria	
GK	Marco Ballotta	Brescia Calcio	
DF	Georges Grün	RSC Anderlecht	
DF	David Balleri	Padova Calcio	
DF	Salvatore Matrecano	S.S.C. Napoli	
DF	Roberto Maltagliati	Torino	
MF	Daniele Zoratto	Padova Calcio	
MF	Roberto Colacone	Carrarese Calcio	
MF	Giovanni Sorce		released

==== Winter ====
In
Pos.	Name	from	Type

== Competitions ==
=== Serie A ===
==== League table ====
Pos	Team	Pld	W	D	L	GF	GA	GD	Pts	Qualification or relegation
1	Juventus (C)	34	23	4	7	59	32	+27	73	Qualified to Champions League
2	Parma	34	18	9	7	51	31	+20	63	Qualification to Cup Winners' Cup
3	Lazio	34	19	6	9	69	34	+35	63	Qualification to UEFA Cup
4	Milan	34	17	9	8	53	32	+21	60	Qualification to UEFA Cup
5	Roma	34	16	11	7	46	25	+21	59	Qualification to UEFA Cup

Source: Serie A, RSSSF.com, Soccerway
Rules for classification: 1) Points; 2) Head-to-head points; 3) Head-to-head goal difference; 4) Goal difference; 5) Goals scored; 6) Draw. (Note: Head-to-head record is used only after all the matches between the teams in question have been played).
(C) Champions

==== Results by round ====
Round	1	2	3	4	5	6	7	8	9	10	11	12	13	14	15	16	17	18	19	20	21	22	23	24	25	26	27	28	29	30	31	32	33	34
Ground	H	A	H	A	H	A	H	H	A	H	A	H	A	A	H	A	H	A	H	A	H	A	H	A	A	H	A	H	A	H	H	A	H	A
Result	W	W	W	D	W	L	W	W	D	W	D	W	D	W	L	D	W	D	W	L	W	W	W	D	L	L	D	W	W	D	W	L	W	L
Position	1	1	1	1	1	2	1	1	1	1	1	1	2	1	2	2	2	2	2	2	2	2	2	2	2	2	2	2	2	2	2	2	2	3

Source: Competitive matches
A = Away; H = Home; W = Win; D = Draw; L = Loss; = Leader, 1995–96 UEFA Champions League Group stage; = 1995–96 UEFA Cup First round

==== Matches ====
4 September 1994 1	Parma	2–0	Cremonese	Parma
	Couto 20'; Zola 60'; D. Baggio (yellow card)	Report	De Agostini (yellow card); Cristiani (yellow card)	Stadium: Stadio Ennio Tardini; Attendance: 35,000; Referee: Livio Bazzoli

11 September 1994 2	Padova	0–3	Parma	Padua
		Report	Minotti 9'; Asprilla 28', 55'	Stadium: Stadio Euganeo; Attendance: 13,000; Referee: Walter Cinciripini

18 September 1994 3	Parma	2–1	Cagliari	Parma
	D. Baggio 30'; Couto 45', (yellow card); Castellini (yellow card)	Report	Oliveira 56' (pen.); Herrera (yellow card); Bellucci (yellow card); Lantignotti (yellow card); Pancaro (red card) 57'	Stadium: Stadio Ennio Tardini; Attendance: 23,000; Referee: Liberto Brignoccoli

25 September 1994 4	Lazio	2–2	Parma	Rome
	Signori 26', 74'	Report	Branca 66', 70'	Stadium: Stadio Olimpico; Attendance: 60,000; Referee: Alfredo Trentalange

2 October 1994 5	Parma	2–0	Torino	Parma
	Zola 57'; Branca 83' (pen.)	Report		Stadium: Stadio Ennio Tardini; Referee: Emilio Pellegrino

15 October 1994 6	Sampdoria	3–1	Parma	Genoa
	Maspero 75' (pen.), 81' (pen.); Mancini 87'	Report	Zola 43'; Di Chiara (red card) 86'	Stadium: Stadio Luigi Ferraris; Referee: Gianni Beschin

23 October 1994 7	Parma	2–1	Reggiana	Parma
	D. Baggio 61'; Branca 79' (pen.)	Report	Futre 15'	Stadium: Stadio Ennio Tardini; Referee: Roberto Bettin

30 October 1994 8	Parma	1–0	Roma	Parma
	Zola 89'	Report		Stadium: Stadio Ennio Tardini; Referee: Loris Stafoggia

6 November 1994 9	Milan	1–1	Parma	Milan
	Massaro 33'	Report	Crippa 74'	Stadium: San Siro; Referee: Piero Ceccarini

20 November 1994 10	Parma	2–0	Foggia	Parma
	D. Baggio 89'; Couto 90'	Report		Stadium: Stadio Ennio Tardini; Referee: Graziano Cesari

27 November 1994 11	Internazionale	1–1	Parma	Milan
	Sosa 24' (pen.)	Report	Branca 61'; Apolloni (red card) 85'	Stadium: San Siro; Referee: Pierluigi Pairetto

4 December 1994 12	Parma	4–0	Brescia	Parma
	Crippa 45'; Zola 59', 65'; D. Baggio 85'	Report		Stadium: Stadio Ennio Tardini; Referee: Gennaro Borriello

11 December 1994 13	Genoa	0–0	Parma	Genoa
		Report		Stadium: Stadio Luigi Ferraris; Referee: Robert Anthony Boggi

18 December 1994 14	Bari	1–2	Parma	Bari
	Tovalieri 20'; Mangone (yellow card); Amoruso (yellow card)	Report	Zola 12'; Crippa 67'	Stadium: Stadio San Nicola; Referee: Loris Stafoggia

8 January 1995 15	Parma	1–3	Juventus	Parma
	D. Baggio 57'; Minotti (yellow card); Crippa (yellow card); Asprilla (yellow card); Couto (yellow card) (yellow-red card) 87'	Report	Sousa 61', (yellow card); Ravanelli 70', 74' (pen.); Torricelli (yellow card); Jarni (yellow card)	Stadium: Stadio Ennio Tardini; Referee: Piero Ceccarini

15 January 1995 16	Fiorentina	1–1	Parma	Florence
	Batistuta 9'	Report	Pin 47'; Benarrivo (yellow card); Susic (yellow card)	Stadium: Stadio Artemio Franchi; Referee: Livio Bazzoli

22 January 1995 17	Parma	2–0	Napoli	Parma
	Asprilla 4', (red card) 90'; Zola 50' (pen.); Crippa (penalty missed) 86'	Report		Stadium: Stadio Ennio Tardini; Referee: Cosimo Bolognino

29 January 1995 18	Cremonese	1–1	Parma	Cremona
	Chiesa 70'	Report	Zola 48' (pen.)	Stadium: Stadio Giovanni Zini; Referee: Angelo Amendolia

12 February 1995 19	Parma	1–0	Padova	Parma
	Zola 72'	Report		Stadium: Stadio Ennio Tardini; Referee: Emilio Pellegrino

19 February 1995 20	Cagliari	2–0	Parma	Cagliari
	Berretta 6'; Oliveira 15'	Report		Stadium: Stadio Sant'Elia; Referee: Marcello Nicchi

26 February 1995 21	Parma	2–0	Lazio	Parma
	Asprilla 11', 52'	Report		Stadium: Stadio Ennio Tardini; Referee: Pierluigi Collina

5 March 1995 22	Torino	0–2	Parma	Turin
		Report	Zola 32'; D. Baggio 88'	Stadium: Stadio delle Alpi; Referee: Graziano Cesari

12 March 1995 23	Parma	3–2	Sampdoria	Parma
	Zola 19', 75', (penalty missed) 67'; Asprilla 22'	Report	Lombardo 55' (pen.); Gullit 64'; Mannini (red card) 77'	Stadium: Stadio Ennio Tardini; Referee: Livio Bazzoli

19 March 1995 24	Reggiana	2–2	Parma	Reggio Emilia
	Esposito 14'; Apolloni 67' (o.g.)	Report	Couto 25'; Minotti 39'	Stadium: Stadio Giglio; Referee: Fiorenzo Treossi

1 April 1995 25	Roma	1–0	Parma	Rome
	Balbo 23'	Report		Stadium: Stadio Olimpico; Referee: Pierluigi Collina

9 April 1995 26	Parma	2–3	Milan	Parma
	Zola 41' (pen.), 84' (pen.); Couto (yellow card); Branca (yellow card)	Report	Lentini 3', (yellow card); Simone 14' (pen.), 53'; Desailly (yellow card); Baresi (red card) 64'	Stadium: Stadio Ennio Tardini; Attendance: 24,449; Referee: Loris Stafoggia

15 April 1995 27	Foggia	0–0	Parma	Foggia
		Report		Stadium: Stadio Pino Zaccheria; Referee: Salvatore Racalbuto

23 April 1995 28	Parma	3–0	Internazionale	Parma
	Sensini 54', 82'; Zola 74'	Report		Stadium: Stadio Ennio Tardini; Referee: Marcello Nicchi

29 April 1995 29	Brescia	1–2	Parma	Brescia
	Neri 21'	Report	Zola 7', 77' (pen.)	Stadium: Stadio Mario Rigamonti; Referee: Gianni Beschin

7 May 1995 30	Parma	0–0	Genoa	Parma
		Report		Stadium: Stadio Ennio Tardini; Referee: Stefano Braschi

13 May 1995 31	Parma	1–0	Bari	Parma
	Fiore 14'	Report		Stadium: Stadio Ennio Tardini; Referee: Robert Anthony Boggi

21 May 1995 32	Juventus	4–0	Parma	Turin
	Ravanelli 11', 68'; Deschamps 37'; Vialli 64'	Report		Stadium: Stadio delle Alpi; Referee: Piero Ceccarini

28 May 1995 33	Parma	3–0	Fiorentina	Parma
	Branca 75', 84'; Zola 80' (pen.)	Report		Stadium: Stadio Ennio Tardini; Referee: Salvatore Racalbuto

4 June 1995 34	Napoli	1–0	Parma	Naples
	Agostini 24' (pen.)	Report	Brolin (red card) 23'	Stadium: Stadio San Paolo; Referee: Walter Cinciripini

=== Coppa Italia ===
==== Second round ====
31 August 1994 First leg	Parma	4–0	Perugia	Parma
20:00 CEST (UTC+02:00)	Zola 15'; Branca 16', 19', 26'; Apolloni (yellow card)	Report	Dicara (yellow card)	Stadium: Stadio Ennio Tardini; Attendance: 6,849; Referee: Pasquale Rodomonti

21 September 1994 Second leg	Perugia	1–0 (1–4 agg.)	Parma	Perugia
20:30 CEST (UTC+02:00)	Pin 40' (o.g.); Ferrante (yellow card)	Report	Di Chiara (yellow card); Castellini (yellow card)	Stadium: Stadio Renato Curi; Attendance: 3,000; Referee: Francesco Arena

==== Eightfinals ====
12 October 1994 First leg	Parma	2–0	Cagliari	Parma
20:30 CEST (UTC+01:00)	D. Baggio 10'; Couto 42'	Report		Stadium: Stadio Ennio Tardini; Referee: Livio Bazzoli

27 October 1994 Second leg	Cagliari	1–1 (1–3 agg.)	Parma	Cagliari
20:30 CEST (UTC+01:00)	Herrera (yellow card) 27'; Bisoli (yellow card) 76'; Valdés 90'	Report	Couto (yellow card) 29'; Sensini 90'	Stadium: Stadio Sant'Elia; Referee: Robert Anthony Boggi

==== Quarter-finals ====
30 November 1994 First leg	Parma	2–0	Fiorentina	Parma
20:00 CEST (UTC+01:00)	Couto (yellow card) 5'; Zola 45'; Branca 52'	Report	Baiano (red card) 5'; Amerini (yellow card) 17'; Luppi (yellow card) 66'	Stadium: Stadio Ennio Tardini; Attendance: 13,492; Referee: Alfredo Trentalange

15 December 1994 Second leg	Fiorentina	1–2 (1–4 agg.)	Parma	Florence
20:40 CEST (UTC+01:00)	Sensini 58' (o.g.); Malusci (yellow card); Luppi (yellow card)	Report	Zola 49'; Branca 70'; Crippa (yellow card)	Stadium: Stadio Artemio Franchi; Attendance: 20,000; Referee: Walter Cinciripini

==== Semi-final ====
9 March 1995 First leg	Foggia	1–1	Parma	Foggia
20:30 CEST (UTC+01:00)	Di Biagio 31'	Report	Asprilla (yellow card) 37'; Couto 58'	Stadium: Stadio Pino Zaccheria; Attendance: 4,841; Referee: Pierluigi Pairetto

12 April 1995 Second leg	Parma	3–1 (4–2 agg.)	Foggia	Parma
20:45 CEST (UTC+02:00)	Couto (yellow card) 39'; Minotti 45'; D. Baggio (yellow card) 48'; Susic (yellow card) 57'; Branca 63'; Zola 80'	Report	Mandelli 42', (yellow card) 61'; Biagioni (yellow card) 65'	Stadium: Stadio Ennio Tardini; Attendance: 7,170; Referee: Virginio Quartuccio

==== Final ====
7 June 1995 First leg	Juventus	1–0	Parma	Turin
21:00 CEST (UTC+02:00)	Porrini 10'; Sousa (yellow card) 62'	Report	Crippa (yellow card) 76'; Mussi (yellow card) 90'	Stadium: Stadio delle Alpi; Attendance: 33,841; Referee: Angelo Amendolia

11 June 1995 Second leg	Parma	0–2 (0–3 agg.)	Juventus	Parma
21:00 CEST (UTC+02:00)	Apolloni (yellow card) 3' (yellow-red card) 86'; Couto (yellow card) 41'; Bucci (yellow card) 54'; Zola (yellow card) 62'	Report	Porrini 26', (yellow card) 42'; Marocchi (yellow card) 50'; Ravanelli 54'	Stadium: Stadio Ennio Tardini; Attendance: 23,823; Referee: Pierluigi Collina

=== UEFA Cup ===
==== First round ====
13 September 1994 First leg	Vitesse (Netherlands)	1–0	(Italy) Parma	Arnhem, Netherlands
19:00 CEST (UTC+02:00)	Simons (yellow card) 23'; Gillhaus 50'	Report	D. Baggio (yellow card) 29'; Crippa (yellow card) 41'; Couto (red card) 76'	Stadium: Nieuw Monnikenhuize; Attendance: 9,000; Referee: Nikolai Levnikov (Russia)

27 September 1994 Second leg	Parma (Italy)	2–0 (2–1 agg.)	(Netherlands) Vitesse	Parma, Italy
20:30 CEST (UTC+01:00)	Zola 23', 72'; D. Baggio (yellow card) 26'; Branca (yellow card) 86'	Report	Vermeulen (yellow card) 51'	Stadium: Stadio Ennio Tardini; Attendance: 9,081; Referee: Hans-Jürgen Weber (Germany)

==== Second round ====
18 October 1994 First leg	AIK (Sweden)	0–1	(Italy) Parma	Solna, Sweden
20:30 CEST (UTC+01:00)	Nordin (yellow card) 27'	Report	Asprilla (yellow card) 13'; Crippa (yellow card) 27', (goal) 71'; Apolloni (yellow card) 29'; Di Chiara (yellow card) 67'	Stadium: Råsunda Stadium; Attendance: 18,000; Referee: Gerald Ashby (England)

2 November 1994 Second leg	Parma (Italy)	2–0 (3–0 agg.)	(Sweden) AIK	Parma, Italy
17:45 CEST (UTC+01:00)	Minotti 5', 15'	Report	Johansson (yellow card) 87'	Stadium: Stadio Ennio Tardini; Attendance: 5,301; Referee: Patrick Kelly (Republic of Ireland)

==== Eightfinals ====
22 November 1994 First leg	Athletic Bilbao (Spain)	1–0	(Italy) Parma	Bilbao, Spain
19:00 CEST (UTC+01:00)	Ziganda 49'	Report	Minotti (yellow card) 44'	Stadium: San Mamés; Attendance: 45,000; Referee: Bo Karlsson (Sweden)

6 December 1994 Second leg	Parma (Italy)	4–2 (4–3 agg.)	(Spain) Athletic Bilbao	Parma, Italy
19:00 CEST (UTC+01:00)	Crippa (yellow card) 7'; Zola 20'; D. Baggio 38', 47'; Couto 63', (yellow card) 74'; Franchini (yellow card) 85'	Report	Urrutia (yellow card) 34'; Vales 56'; Mendiguren (yellow card) 62'; Guerrero 76'; Ziganda (yellow card) 78'	Stadium: Stadio Ennio Tardini; Attendance: 14,627; Referee: David Elleray (England)

==== Quarter-finals ====
28 February 1995 First leg	Parma (Italy)	1–0	(Denmark) Odense	Parma, Italy
19:00 CEST (UTC+01:00)	Susic (yellow card) 28'; D. Baggio (yellow card) 33'; Benarrivo (yellow card) 36'; Asprilla (yellow card) 41'; Zola 49' (pen.)	Report	O. Hansen (yellow card) 25'; Dethlefsen (yellow card) 27'; J. Hansen (yellow card) 45'	Stadium: Stadio Ennio Tardini; Attendance: 6,319; Referee: Rune Pedersen (Norway)

14 March 1995 Second leg	Odense (Denmark)	0–0 (0–1 agg.)	(Italy) Parma	Odense, Denmark
20:00 CEST (UTC+01:00)		Report	Pin (yellow card) 38'; Branca (yellow card) 48'	Stadium: Fionia Park; Attendance: 13,000; Referee: Atanas Ouzounov (Bulgaria)

==== Semi-finals ====
4 April 1995 First leg	Bayer Leverkusen (Germany)	1–2	(Italy) Parma	Leverkusen, Germany
19:00 CEST (UTC+02:00)	Paulo Sérgio 20'	Report	Benarrivo (yellow card) 9'; Sensini (yellow card) 43'; D. Baggio 48'; Asprilla 53'	Stadium: Ulrich-Haberland-Stadion; Attendance: 20,000; Referee: Manuel Díaz Vega (Spain)

18 April 1995 Second leg	Parma (Italy)	3–0 (5–1 agg.)	(Germany) Bayer Leverkusen	Parma, Italy
18:30 CEST (UTC+02:00)	Asprilla 3', 55'; Crippa (yellow card) 51'; Zola 67'	Report		Stadium: Stadio Ennio Tardini; Attendance: 14,000; Referee: Guy Goethals (Belgium)

==== Final ====
3 May 1995 First leg	Parma (Italy)	1–0	(Italy) Juventus	Parma, Italy
20:30 CEST (UTC+02:00)	D. Baggio 5'; Apolloni (yellow card) 16'; Pin (yellow card) 42'; Zola (yellow card) 54'; Sensini (yellow card) 60'	Report	Deschamps (yellow card) 61'; Tacchinardi (yellow card) 82'	Stadium: Stadio Ennio Tardini; Attendance: 22,062; Referee: Antonio López Nieto (Spain)

17 May 1995 Second leg	Juventus (Italy)	1–1 (1–2 agg.)	(Italy) Parma	Milan, Italy
20:30 CEST (UTC+02:00)	Ravanelli (yellow card) 16'; Vialli 35', (yellow card) 43'; Ferrara (yellow card) 63'	Report	Couto (yellow card) 2'; Minotti (yellow card) 29'; Crippa (yellow card) 47'; D. Baggio 53'; Asprilla (yellow card) 72'; Castellini (yellow card) 86'	Stadium: Stadio San Siro; Attendance: 80,754; Referee: Frans van den Wijngaert (Belgium)

== Statistics ==
=== Squad statistics ===
No.	Pos	Nat	Player	Total		Serie A		Coppa		UEFA Cup	
No.	Pos	Nat	Player	Apps	Goals	Apps	Goals	Apps	Goals	Apps	Goals
	GK	(Italy) ITA	Bucci	45	-35	30	-25	3	-4	12	-6
	DF	(Italy) ITA	Mussi	43	0	19+9	0	8	0	4+3	0
	DF	(Italy) ITA	Minotti	54	5	33	2	10	1	11	2
	DF	(Portugal) POR	Couto	44	7	27	4	9	2	8	1
	DF	(Italy) ITA	Apolloni	45	0	29	0	7	0	9	0
	DF	(Italy) ITA	Di Chiara	48	0	30	0	8	0	10	0
	MF	(Italy) ITA	Crippa	48	4	27+4	3	9	0	8	1
	MF	(Argentina) ARG	Sensini	42	3	19+5	2	8	1	9+1	0
	MF	(Italy) ITA	Dino Baggio	49	12	31	6	7	1	10+1	5
	FW	(Italy) ITA	Zola	51	28	32	19	7	4	12	5
	FW	(Colombia) COL	Asprilla	40	9	24+1	6	7	0	7+1	3
	GK	(Italy) ITA	Galli	17	-10	4+6	-6	7	-4	0	0
	MF	(Italy) ITA	Pin	41	1	18+5	1	8	0	8+2	0
	DF	(Italy) ITA	Benarrivo	22	2	14+3	2	0	0	5	0
	FW	(Italy) ITA	Branca	40	13	13+12	7	8	6	4+3	0
	MF	(Sweden) SWE	Brolin	16	0	10+1	0	1	0	4	0
	DF	(Italy) ITA	Susic	18	0	6+3	0	4	0	5	0
	MF	(Italy) ITA	Fiore	20	1	4+4	1	6	0	2+4	0
	DF	(Italy) ITA	Castellini	19	0	4+4	0	4	0	4+3	0
	MF	(Italy) ITA	Caruso	5	0	0+2	0	2	0	0+1	0
	DF	(Italy) ITA	Pellegrini	3	0	0+1	0	2	0		
	MF	(Italy) ITA	Magnani	1	0	0+1	0				
	GK	(Italy) ITA	G. Franchini	1	0	0	0	0	0	1	0
	MF	(Italy) ITA	G. Hervatin	1	0	0	0	1	0		
	MF	(Italy) ITA	M. Lemme	1	0	0	0	1	0		
	GK	(Italy) ITA	Bachini								
	DF	(Italy) ITA	Cicarti								

- Source: http://calcio-seriea.net/rose/1994/1080/
