= 1995–96 Parma AC season =

Parma
1995–96 season
- Owner: Parmalat
- President: Giorgio Pedraneschi
- Manager: Nevio Scala
- Stadium: Il Tardini
- Serie A: 6th
- Coppa Italia: 2nd round
- UEFA Cup Winners' Cup: Quarter-finals
- Top goalscorer: League: Zola (10); All: Zola (12)
Home colours	Away colours	Third colours

Parma Associazione Calcio played its sixth consecutive Serie A season, which was the last under legendary coach Nevio Scala, who stepped down at the end of the season. Defensive stalwarts Alberto Di Chiara and Lorenzo Minotti also left the club following the season's conclusion. Despite being only one point behind third-placed Lazio, Parma finished 6th in the standings. In contrast to the previous four seasons, Parma did not win any cups either. The most significant moment of Parma's season was the debut of the club's new superstar, 17-year-old goalkeeper Gianluigi Buffon, who saved a penalty on his debut against A.C. Milan.

== Players ==
=== Squad information ===
Note: Flags indicate national team as defined under FIFA eligibility rules; some limited exceptions apply. Players may hold more than one non-FIFA nationality.

No.	Pos.	Nation	Player
1	GK	ITA	Luca Bucci
2	DF	ITA	Antonio Benarrivo
3	DF	ITA	Alberto Di Chiara
4	DF	ITA	Lorenzo Minotti
5	DF	ITA	Luigi Apolloni
6	DF	POR	Fernando Couto
7	DF	ARG	Roberto Sensini
8	FW	BUL	Hristo Stoichkov
9	MF	ITA	Massimo Crippa
10	FW	ITA	Gianfranco Zola
11	FW	SWE	Tomas Brolin
12	GK	ITA	Gianluigi Buffon
13	MF	ITA	Tarcisio Catanese

No.	Pos.	Nation	Player
14	DF	ITA	Roberto Mussi
15	DF	ITA	Massimo Susic
16	FW	ITA	Filippo Inzaghi
17	DF	ITA	Fabio Cannavaro
18	FW	COL	Faustino Asprilla
19	FW	ITA	Marco Ferrante
20	FW	ITA	Alessandro Melli
21	DF	ITA	Marcello Castellini
22	GK	ITA	Giovanni Galli
23	MF	ITA	Massimo Brambilla
24	MF	ITA	Dino Baggio
25	MF	ITA	Gabriele Pin
26	GK	ITA	Alessandro Nista

=== Transfers ===
In
Pos.	Name	from	Type
FW	Hristo Stoichkov	FC Barcelona	
DF	Fabio Cannavaro	SSC Napoli	
FW	Filippo Inzaghi	Piacenza Calcio	
DF	Tarcisio Catanese	AC Ancona	
FW	Alessandro Melli	A.C. Milan	loan ended

Out
Pos.	Name	from	Type
GK	Giovanni Galli	Lucchese	
FW	Marco Branca	A.S. Roma	
DF	Diego Pellegrini	A.C. Ancona	
MF	Stefano Fiore	Padova Calcio	
MF	Roberto Magnani	A.C. Ancona	

==== Winter ====
In
Pos.	Name	from	Type

Out
Pos.	Name	to	Type
MF	Tomas Brolin	Leeds United	
MF	Marco Libassi	Valdagno	
FW	Faustino Asprilla	Newcastle United	
FW	Marco Ferrante	Salernitana	co-ownership

== Competitions ==
=== Serie A ===
==== League table ====
Pos	Team	Pld	W	D	L	GF	GA	GD	Pts	Qualification or relegation
4	Fiorentina	34	17	8	9	53	41	+12	59	Qualification to Cup Winners' Cup
5	Roma	34	16	10	8	51	34	+17	58 (Note: ROM 1-1 PAR; PAR 1-1 ROM Roma is ahead due to Goal difference.)	Qualification to UEFA Cup
6	Parma	34	16	10	8	44	31	+13	58	Qualification to UEFA Cup
7	Internazionale	34	15	9	10	51	30	+21	54	Qualification to UEFA Cup
8	Sampdoria	34	14	10	10	59	47	+12	52	

Source: 1995–96 Serie A, RSSSF.com, Soccerway
Rules for classification: 1) Points; 2) Head-to-head points; 3) Head-to-head goal difference; 4) Goal difference; 5) Goals scored; 6) Draw. (Note: Head-to-head record is used only after all the matches between the teams in question have been played).

==== Results summary ====
Overall								Home						Away					
Pld	W	D	L	GF	GA	GD	Pts	W	D	L	GF	GA	GD	W	D	L	GF	GA	GD
34	16	10	8	44	31	+13	58	13	3	1	29	9	+20	3	7	7	15	22	−7

Last updated: 12 May 1996.
Source: Competitive matches

==== Results by round ====
Round	1	2	3	4	5	6	7	8	9	10	11	12	13	14	15	16	17	18	19	20	21	22	23	24	25	26	27	28	29	30	31	32	33	34
Ground	A	H	A	H	A	H	A	H	A	H	H	A	H	A	H	A	H	A	H	A	H	A	H	A	H	A	A	A	H	A	H	A	H	A
Result	D	W	L	W	W	W	D	W	W	D	D	D	W	D	L	D	W	W	D	W	L	W	D	D	L	L	L	W	W	L	W	W	W	L
Position	7	4	8	5	4	2	2	1	1	1	2	2	2	3	3	3	3	3	3	2	3	3	3	3	4	5	5	5	4	5	4	4	3	6

Source: Competitive matches
A = Away; H = Home; W = Win; D = Draw; L = Loss; = 1996–97 UEFA Champions League; = 1996–97 UEFA Cup; = 1996–97 Serie B

==== Matches ====
27 August 1995 1	Atalanta	1–1	Parma	Bergamo
	Vieri 90'	Report	Stoichkov 77'	Stadium: Stadio Atleti Azzurri d'Italia; Referee: Stefano Braschi

10 September 1995 2	Parma	2–1	Internazionale	Parma
	Zola 48'; D. Baggio 52'	Report	Roberto Carlos 41'	Stadium: Stadio Ennio Tardini; Referee: Loris Stafoggia

17 September 1995 3	Sampdoria	3–0	Parma	Genoa
	Karembeu 22', 75'; Bellucci 88'	Report		Stadium: Stadio Luigi Ferraris; Referee: Piero Ceccarini

24 September 1995 4	Parma	3–0	Fiorentina	Parma
	Stoichkov 35'; Crippa 41'; Benarrivo 64'	Report		Stadium: Stadio Ennio Tardini; Referee: Salvatore Racalbuto

1 October 1995 5	Padova	1–3	Parma	Padua
	Amoruso 50' (pen.)	Report	Stoichkov 15', 37'; Zola 77'	Stadium: Stadio Euganeo; Referee: Robert Anthony Boggi

15 October 1995 6	Parma	1–0	Udinese	Parma
	Melli 77'	Report		Stadium: Stadio Ennio Tardini; Referee: Stefano Farina

22 October 1995 7	Roma	1–1	Parma	Rome
	Fonseca 46'	Report	D. Baggio 75'	Stadium: Stadio Olimpico; Referee: Marcello Nicchi

29 October 1995 8	Parma	3–2	Piacenza	Parma
	Zola 23', 61'; Inzaghi 90'	Report	Carbone 53'; Rossini (red card) 81'; Caccia 82' (pen.)	Stadium: Stadio Ennio Tardini; Referee: Livio Bazzoli

5 November 1995 9	Cremonese	0–2	Parma	Cremona
		Report	Cannavaro 43'; Zola 74'	Stadium: Stadio Giovanni Zini; Referee: Alfredo Trentalange

19 November 1995 10	Parma	0–0	Milan	Parma
		Report		Stadium: Stadio Ennio Tardini; Referee: Robert Anthony Boggi

26 November 1995 11	Parma	1–1	Juventus	Parma
	Asprilla 45'; Inzaghi 90'	Report	9' Ferrara	Stadium: Il Tardini; Referee: Stefano Braschi

3 December 1995 12	Napoli	1–1	Parma	Naples
	Pizzi 38'	Report	Zola 52' (pen.)	Stadium: Stadio San Paolo; Referee: Livio Bazzoli

10 December 1995 13	Parma	2–1	Lazio	Parma
	Asprilla 36'; Zola 47'	Report	Di Matteo 90'	Stadium: Stadio Ennio Tardini; Referee: Alfredo Trentalange

17 December 1995 14	Bari	1–1	Parma	Bari
	Protti 45' (pen.)	Report	Asprilla (red card) 83'; Melli 87'	Stadium: Stadio San Nicola; Referee: Pierluigi Pairetto

23 December 1995 15	Parma	0–1	Vicenza	Parma
		Report	Murgita 56'	Stadium: Stadio Ennio Tardini; Referee: Virginio Quartuccio

7 January 1996 16	Torino	2–2	Parma	Turin
	Dionigi 43'; Cristallini (red card) 68'; Angloma 78'	Report	Sensini 27'; D. Baggio 67'	Stadium: Stadio delle Alpi; Referee: Graziano Cesari

14 January 1996 17	Parma	4–0	Cagliari	Parma
	Mussi 17'; Apolloni (red card) 57'; Di Chiara 66', 90'; Firicano 69' (o.g.)	Report		Stadium: Stadio Ennio Tardini; Referee: Loris Stafoggia

21 January 1996 18	Parma	2–0	Atalanta	Parma
	Pin 37'; Melli 45'	Report	Vieri (penalty missed) 52'	Stadium: Stadio Ennio Tardini; Referee: Fiorenzo Treossi

28 January 1996 19	Internazionale	1–1	Parma	Milan
	Branca 83'	Report	Stoichkov 5'	Stadium: San Siro; Referee: Pierluigi Collina

4 February 1996 20	Parma	1–0	Sampdoria	Parma
	Lamonica 19' (o.g.)	Report		Stadium: Stadio Ennio Tardini; Referee: Gianni Beschin

11 February 1996 21	Fiorentina	1–0	Parma	Florence
	Amoruso 25'	Report		Stadium: Stadio Artemio Franchi; Referee: Domenico Messina

18 February 2016 22	Parma	2–1	Padova	Parma
	Melli 11'; Benarrivo 58'	Report	Kreek 89'	Stadium: Stadio Ennio Tardini; Referee: Gennaro Borriello

25 February 1996 23	Udinese	0–0	Parma	Udine
		Report		Stadium: Stadio Friuli; Referee: Stefano Braschi

2 March 1996 24	Parma	1–1	Roma	Parma
	Sensini 45'; Crippa (red card) 45'	Report	Fonseca 3', (red card) 45'; Giannini (penalty missed) 90'	Stadium: Stadio Ennio Tardini; Referee: Roberto Bettin

10 March 1996 25	Piacenza	2–1	Parma	Piacenza
	Caccia 2', 45' (pen.)	Report	Arioli 71'	Stadium: Stadio Galleana; Referee: Fiorenzo Treossi

24 March 1996 27	Milan	3–0	Parma	Milan
	R. Baggio (penalty missed) 10', 43'; Donadoni 48'; Savićević 72'	Report		Stadium: San Siro; Referee: Pierluigi Collina

30 March 1996 28	Juventus	1–0	Parma	Turin
	Bucci 63' (o.g.)	Report		Stadium: Stadio delle Alpi; Referee: Loris Stafoggia

6 April 1996 29	Parma	1–0	Napoli	Parma
	Apolloni 15', (red card) 70'; Di Chiara (red card) 60'	Report		Stadium: Stadio Ennio Tardini; Referee: Salvatore Racalbuto

10 April 1996 26	Parma	2–0	Cremonese	Parma
	Mussi 56'; Zola 90'	Report	Perović (red card) 51'	Stadium: Stadio Ennio Tardini; Referee: Pasquale Rodomonti

14 April 1996 30	Lazio	2–1	Parma	Rome
	Fuser 14'; Casiraghi 39'	Report	Zola 80'	Stadium: Stadio Olimpico; Referee: Pierluigi Pairetto

20 April 1996 31	Parma	3–1	Bari	Parma
	D. Baggio 8'; Inzaghi 26'; Piro 90'	Report	Andersson 12'	Stadium: Stadio Ennio Tardini; Referee: Graziano Cesari

28 April 1996 32	Vicenza	0–1	Parma	Vicenza
		Report	Benarrivo 78'	Stadium: Stadio Romeo Menti; Referee: Robert Anthony Boggi

5 May 1996 33	Parma	1–0	Torino	Parma
	Zola 36'	Report		Stadium: Stadio Ennio Tardini; Referee: Massimo De Santis

12 May 1996 34	Cagliari	2–0	Parma	Cagliari
	Sensini 41' (o.g.); Oliveira 75' (pen.)	Report		Stadium: Stadio Sant'Elia; Referee: Stefano Farina

=== Coppa Italia ===
30 August 1995 Second round	Palermo	3–0	Parma	Palermo
	Caterino 7'; Vasari 46', 83'	Report		Stadium: Stadio Renzo Barbera; Attendance: 23,110; Referee: Robert Anthony Boggi

=== UEFA Cup Winners' Cup ===
==== First round ====
14 September 1995 First leg	KS Teuta (Albania)	0–2	(Italy) Parma	Tirana, Albania
16:30 CEST (UTC+02:00)			Zola 72', 85'	Stadium: Qemal Stafa Stadium; Attendance: 8,100; Referee: Dimitar Momirov (Bulgaria)

28 September 1995 Second leg	Parma (Italy)	2–0 (4–0 agg.)	(Albania) KS Teuta	Parma, Italy
20:45 CEST (UTC+01:00)	Melli 8'; Inzaghi 90'			Stadium: Stadio Ennio Tardini; Attendance: 10,291; Referee: Milan Mitrović (Slovenia)

==== Second round ====
19 October 1995 First leg	Halmstad (Sweden)	3–0	(Italy) Parma	Gothenburg, Sweden
20:05 CEST (UTC+01:00)	Gudmundsson 7', 31'; R. Andersson 76'			Stadium: Gamla Ullevi; Attendance: 9,306; Referee: Bernd Heynemann (Germany)

2 November 1995 Second leg	Parma (Italy)	4–0 (4–3 agg.)	(Sweden) Halmstad	Parma, Italy
20:30 CEST (UTC+01:00)	Inzaghi 2'; D. Baggio 38'; Stoichkov 53'; Benarrivo 69'			Stadium: Stadio Ennio Tardini; Attendance: 13,053; Referee: Finn Lambek (Denmark)

==== Quarter-finals ====
7 March 1996 First leg	Parma (Italy)	1–0	(France) Paris Saint-Germain	Parma, Italy
20:45 CEST (UTC+01:00)	D. Baggio (yellow card) 54'; Stoichkov 58'; Mussi (yellow card) 74'		Loko (yellow card) 44'	Stadium: Stadio Ennio Tardini; Attendance: 12,447; Referee: Sándor Puhl (Hungary)

21 March 1996 Second leg	Paris Saint-Germain (France)	3–1 (3–2 agg.)	(Italy) Parma	Paris, France
20:30 CEST (UTC+01:00)	Raí 9' (pen.), 69' (pen.), (yellow card) 83'; Loko 38'		Melli (yellow card) 4', (goal) 26'; Pin (yellow card) 59'	Stadium: Parc des Princes; Attendance: 43,686; Referee: Leif Sundell (Sweden)

=== Supercoppa Italiana ===
17 January 1996	Juventus	1–0	Parma	Turin
20:30 CEST (UTC+01:00)	Vialli 33'; Peruzzi (red card) 39'			Stadium: Stadio delle Alpi; Attendance: 5,289; Referee: Piero Ceccarini

== Statistics ==
=== Players statistics ===
No.	Pos	Nat	Player	Total		Serie A		Coppa		UCWC	
No.	Pos	Nat	Player	Apps	Goals	Apps	Goals	Apps	Goals	Apps	Goals
1	GK	(Italy) ITA	Bucci	33	-34	26	-25	1	-3	6	-6
14	DF	(Italy) ITA	Mussi	38	2	31+1	2	1	0	5	0
17	DF	(Italy) ITA	Cannavaro	35	1	29	1	0	0	6	0
5	DF	(Italy) ITA	Apolloni	31	1	26	1	0	0	5	0
2	DF	(Italy) ITA	Benarrivo	34	3	22+5	3	1	0	6	0
23	MF	(Italy) ITA	Brambilla	31	0	20+6	0	1	0	4	0
24	MF	(Italy) ITA	Dino Baggio	33	5	28	4	1	0	4	1
7	MF	(Argentina) ARG	Sensini	38	2	30+1	2	1	0	6	0
9	MF	(Italy) ITA	Crippa	37	1	24+7	1	1	0	5	0
10	FW	(Italy) ITA	Zola	35	12	28+1	10	1	0	5	2
8	FW	(Bulgaria) BUL	Stoichkov	29	7	18+5	5	1	0	5	2
12	GK	(Italy) ITA	Buffon	9	-6	7+2	-6				
4	DF	(Italy) ITA	Minotti	20	0	16+2	0	1	0	1	0
3	DF	(Italy) ITA	Di Chiara	27	2	14+8	2	0	0	5	0
25	MF	(Italy) ITA	Pin	24	1	14+6	1	0	0	4	0
20	FW	(Italy) ITA	Melli	29	6	12+12	4	1	0	4	2
6	DF	(Portugal) POR	Couto	14	0	10+2	0	0	0	2	0
16	FW	(Italy) ITA	Inzaghi	22	4	7+8	2	1	0	6	2
21	DF	(Italy) ITA	Castellini	9	0	5+4	0				
18	FW	(Colombia) COL	Asprilla	6	2	4+2	2				
27	FW	(Italy) ITA	Piro	6	1	1+5	1				
13	MF	(Italy) ITA	Catanese	6	0	1+4	0	0	0	1	0
26	GK	(Italy) ITA	Nista	1	0	1	0				
11	FW	(Sweden) SWE	Brolin	8	1	0+4	1	1	0	3	0
	MF	(Italy) ITA	Arioli	1	1	0+1	1				
15	DF	(Italy) ITA	Susic	0	0	0	0				
19	FW	(Italy) ITA	Ferrante	0	0	0	0				
22	GK	(Italy) ITA	Galli	0	0	0	0				

- Source: http://calcio-seriea.net/presenze/1995/1089/
