= 1995 UEFA Cup final =

- Event: 1994–95 UEFA Cup
| Parma | Juventus |
| (Italy) | (Italy) |
| 2 | 1 |
- on aggregate

First leg
| Parma | Juventus |
| 1 | 0 |
- Date: 3 May 1995
- Venue: Stadio Ennio Tardini, Parma
- Referee: Antonio López Nieto (Spain)
- Attendance: 22,062

Second leg
| Juventus | Parma |
| 1 | 1 |
- Date: 17 May 1995
- Venue: San Siro, Milan
- Referee: Frans Van Den Wijngaert (Belgium)
- Attendance: 80,754

The 1995 UEFA Cup final was played over two legs between two Italian teams Juventus and Parma. The first leg at Parma's Stadio Ennio Tardini ended in a 1–0 victory for the home team. The second leg at the San Siro in Milan finished in a 1–1 draw, and a win on aggregate for Parma. It was their first UEFA Cup final victory, with Juventus having won three in the past.

== Background ==
This was the fifth time a continental final had been played by two teams from the same country and the third all-Italian final. The first also featured Juventus, who overcame Fiorentina by three goals to one over two legs in the 1990 UEFA Cup final. It was Parma's first appearance in a UEFA Cup final, but represented the third consecutive year in which they had contested a European final, following European Cup Winners' Cup final appearances in 1993 (a win) and 1994 (a defeat). It was Juventus' fourth appearance in a UEFA Cup final; the previous finals were all two-legged affairs ending in victory for the Turin club, against Athletic Bilbao in 1977 on the away goals rule, Fiorentina in 1990 and Borussia Dortmund in 1993.

Parma's only previous experience in Europe against another Italian side was in the 1993 European Super Cup when they emerged victorious over AC Milan by two goals to one over two legs, having lost the first leg at home by a single goal. Juventus were meanwhile attempting to complete the second part of a potential treble of titles: Serie A, Coppa Italia and the UEFA Cup.

While Parma played their home tie at their home ground, Stadio Ennio Tardini, Juventus chose to play their home leg away from Turin at the San Siro, home ground of Inter Milan and Milan, because they had difficulties with the landlord at their own stadium, Stadio delle Alpi, and had experienced poor attendances there, in contrast to the big crowds they attracted playing in other cities. They had already played the semi-final of the competition in Milan (and would later play the 1996 UEFA Super Cup even further from home, in Palermo).

The two sides would also meet the following month in the 1995 Coppa Italia final, which Juventus won 3–0 on aggregate.

== Route to the final ==
| Parma | | | | Juventus |
|---|---|---|---|---|---|---|
| Opponent | Result | Legs | Round | Opponent | Result | Legs |
| (Netherlands) Vitesse | 2–1 | 0–1 away; 2–0 home | First round | (Bulgaria) CSKA Sofia | 8–1 | 3–0 away; 5–1 home |
| (Sweden) AIK | 3–0 | 1–0 away; 2–0 home | Second round | (Portugal) Marítimo | 3–1 | 1–0 away; 2–1 home |
| (Spain) Athletic Bilbao | 4–3 | 0–1 away; 4–2 home | Third round | (Austria) Admira Wacker | 5–2 | 3–1 away; 2–1 home |
| (Denmark) Odense | 1–0 | 1–0 home; 0–0 away | Quarter-finals | (Germany) Eintracht Frankfurt | 4–1 | 1–1 away; 3–0 home |
| (Germany) Bayer Leverkusen | 5–1 | 2–1 away; 3–0 home | Semi-finals | (Germany) Borussia Dortmund | 4–3 | 2–2 home; 2–1 away |

== First leg ==
=== Summary ===
Parma, the home team, went into a fifth-minute lead through Dino Baggio, which they held and subsequently took to the return at Milan's San Siro.

=== Details ===
3 May 1995
20:30 CEST

| Parma (Italy) | 1–0 | (Italy) Juventus |
|---|---|---|
| Baggio 5' | Report |

Stadio Ennio Tardini, Parma
Attendance: 22,062
Referee: Antonio López Nieto (Spain)

| Parma | Juventus |

| GK | 1 | (Italy) Luca Bucci |
| SW | 4 | (Italy) Lorenzo Minotti (c) |
| CB | 9 | (Argentina) Roberto Sensini | (yellow card) 60' |
| CB | 6 | (Portugal) Fernando Couto |
| CB | 5 | (Italy) Luigi Apolloni | (yellow card) 16' |
| DM | 8 | (Italy) Dino Baggio |
| RM | 2 | (Italy) Antonio Benarrivo | | (substituted off) 8' |
| CM | 7 | (Italy) Gabriele Pin | (yellow card) 42' |
| LM | 3 | (Italy) Alberto Di Chiara |
| SS | 10 | (Italy) Gianfranco Zola | (yellow card) 54' | (substituted off) 89' |
| CF | 11 | (Colombia) Faustino Asprilla |
Substitutes:
| GK | 12 | (Italy) Giovanni Galli |
| DF | 13 | (Italy) Massimo Susic |
| DF | 15 | (Italy) Roberto Mussi | | (substituted on) 8' |
| MF | 16 | (Italy) Stefano Fiore | | (substituted on) 89' |
| FW | 14 | (Italy) Marco Branca |
Manager:
(Italy) Nevio Scala

| GK | 1 | (Italy) Michelangelo Rampulla |
| RB | 4 | (Italy) Luca Fusi | | (substituted off) 72' |
| CB | 2 | (Italy) Massimo Carrera | | (substituted off) 46' |
| CB | 6 | (Italy) Alessio Tacchinardi | (yellow card) 82' |
| LB | 3 | (Croatia) Robert Jarni |
| RM | 7 | (Italy) Angelo Di Livio |
| CM | 5 | (Portugal) Paulo Sousa |
| LM | 8 | (France) Didier Deschamps | (yellow card) 61' |
| SS | 10 | (Italy) Roberto Baggio (c) |
| RF | 9 | (Italy) Gianluca Vialli |
| CF | 11 | (Italy) Fabrizio Ravanelli |
Substitutes:
| GK | 12 | (Italy) Lorenzo Squizzi |
| RB | 13 | (Italy) Sergio Porrini |
| CM | 14 | (Italy) Giancarlo Marocchi | | (substituted on) 46' |
| MF | 15 | (Italy) Simone Tognon |
| SS | 16 | (Italy) Alessandro Del Piero | | (substituted on) 72' |
Manager:
(Italy) Marcello Lippi

Assistant referees:
Victoriano Giráldez Carrasco (Spain)
Joaquín Olmos González (Spain)
Fourth official:
Juan Ansuátegui Roca (Spain)

Match rules

- 90 minutes
- 30 minutes of golden goal extra time if necessary
- Penalty shoot-out if scores still level
- Five named substitutes
- Maximum of two substitutions

== Second leg ==
=== Summary ===
Gianluca Vialli restored parity in the tie overall before Dino Baggio struck again to give Parma a 2–1 aggregate victory. Thus provincial Parma added the UEFA Cup to the UEFA Cup Winners' Cup they had won two years before.

=== Details ===
17 May 1995
20:30 CEST

| Juventus (Italy) | 1–1 | (Italy) Parma |
|---|---|---|
| Vialli 35' | Report | Baggio 53' |

San Siro, Milan
Attendance: 80,754
Referee: Frans Van Den Wijngaert (Belgium)

| Juventus | Parma |

| GK | 1 | (Italy) Angelo Peruzzi |
| RB | 4 | (Italy) Moreno Torricelli |
| CB | 2 | (Italy) Ciro Ferrara | (yellow card) 63' |
| CB | 5 | (Italy) Sergio Porrini |
| LB | 3 | (Croatia) Robert Jarni |
| RM | 7 | (Italy) Angelo Di Livio | | (substituted off) 82' |
| CM | 6 | (Portugal) Paulo Sousa |
| LM | 8 | (Italy) Giancarlo Marocchi | | (substituted off) 75' |
| AM | 10 | (Italy) Roberto Baggio (c) |
| CF | 9 | (Italy) Gianluca Vialli | (yellow card) 43' |
| CF | 11 | (Italy) Fabrizio Ravanelli | (yellow card) 16' |
Substitutes:
| GK | 12 | (Italy) Michelangelo Rampulla |
| DF | 14 | (Italy) Massimo Carrera | | (substituted on) 82' |
| MF | 13 | (Italy) Luca Fusi |
| MF | 15 | (Italy) Simone Tognon |
| FW | 16 | (Italy) Alessandro Del Piero | | (substituted on) 75' |
Manager:
(Italy) Marcello Lippi

| GK | 1 | (Italy) Luca Bucci |
| RB | 2 | (Italy) Antonio Benarrivo | | (substituted off) 46' |
| CB | 6 | (Portugal) Fernando Couto | (yellow card) 2' |
| CB | 4 | (Italy) Lorenzo Minotti (c) | (yellow card) 29' |
| CB | 5 | (Italy) Massimo Susic |
| LB | 3 | (Italy) Alberto Di Chiara | | (substituted off) 81' |
| RM | 7 | (Italy) Stefano Fiore |
| CM | 8 | (Italy) Dino Baggio |
| LM | 9 | (Italy) Massimo Crippa | (yellow card) 47' |
| CF | 10 | (Italy) Gianfranco Zola |
| CF | 11 | (Colombia) Faustino Asprilla | (yellow card) 72' |
Substitutes:
| GK | 12 | (Italy) Giovanni Galli |
| CB | 13 | (Italy) Marcello Castellini | (yellow card) 86' | (substituted on) 81' |
| RB | 15 | (Italy) Roberto Mussi | | (substituted on) 46' |
| RF | 14 | (Italy) Marco Branca |
| LF | 16 | (Sweden) Tomas Brolin |
Manager:
(Italy) Nevio Scala

Assistant referees:
Luc Matthys (Belgium)
Marc Van den Broeck (Belgium)
Fourth official:
Marnix Sandra (Belgium)

Match rules

- 90 minutes
- 30 minutes of golden goal extra time if necessary
- Penalty shoot-out if scores still level
- Five named substitutes
- Maximum of two substitutions

== See also ==
- 1995 UEFA Champions League final
- 1995 UEFA Cup Winners' Cup final
- Italian football clubs in international competitions
- Juventus FC in international football
- Parma Calcio 1913 in European football
- 1994–95 Juventus FC season
- 1994–95 Parma AC season
