= 1994–95 Juventus FC season =

Italian football club season

Juventus
1994–95 season
- President: Vittorio Chiusano
- Manager: Marcello Lippi
- Stadium: Stadio delle Alpi
- Serie A: 1st (in UEFA Champions League)
- Coppa Italia: Winners
- UEFA Cup: Runners-up
- Top goalscorer: League: Gianluca Vialli (17); All: Fabrizio Ravanelli (30)
Home colours	Away colours	Third colours

In the 1994–95 season, Juventus Football Club won the league title for the first time in nine years. The Scudetto was won in the wake of defender Andrea Fortunato's death from cancer during the course of the season. The title was dedicated to the 23-year-old, who had been established in the starting line-up before he got sick.

This first Serie A success since the 1985–86 season was accompanied by a Coppa Italia win over Parma. The Turin club won both legs, 1–0 at the Stadio delle Alpi and 2–0 at the Stadio Ennio Tardini.

In the UEFA Cup, Juventus again met Parma in the final, having previously beaten Borussia Dortmund. This time, however, Juventus were defeated by Parma (0–1, 1–1), thus denying them a season treble.

== Overview ==
Competition	Result	Top Scorer
Serie A	Winners	(Italy) Gianluca Vialli, 17
Coppa Italia	Winners	(Italy) Fabrizio Ravanelli, 6
UEFA Cup	Runners-up	(Italy) Fabrizio Ravanelli, 9
Overall		(Italy) Fabrizio Ravanelli, 30

== Players ==
=== Squad information ===
Squad at end of season

Note: Flags indicate national team as defined under FIFA eligibility rules; some limited exceptions apply. Players may hold more than one non-FIFA nationality.

Pos.	Nation	Player
GK	ITA	Angelo Peruzzi
GK	ITA	Michelangelo Rampulla
GK	ITA	Lorenzo Squizzi
DF	ITA	Moreno Torricelli
DF	ITA	Sergio Porrini
DF	ITA	Ciro Ferrara
DF	GER	Jürgen Kohler
DF	ITA	Luca Fusi
DF	ITA	Massimo Carrera
DF	ITA	Alessandro Orlando
DF	CRO	Robert Jarni

Pos.	Nation	Player
MF	ITA	Angelo Di Livio
MF	POR	Paulo Sousa
MF	ITA	Antonio Conte
MF	FRA	Didier Deschamps
MF	ITA	Alessio Tacchinardi
MF	ITA	Giancarlo Marocchi
FW	ITA	Gianluca Vialli (vice-captain)
FW	ITA	Alessandro Del Piero
FW	ITA	Roberto Baggio (Captain)
FW	ITA	Fabrizio Ravanelli

=== Transfers ===
In
Pos.	Name	from	Type
DF	Ciro Ferrara	S.S.C. Napoli	-
MF	Paulo Sousa	Sporting Lisboa	-
MF	Didier Deschamps	Olympique Marseille	€5.5 million
DF	Robert Jarni	Torino	-
MF	Alessio Tacchinardi	Atalanta B.C.	-
FW	Paolo Di Canio	S.S.C. Napoli	loan ended

Out
Pos.	Name	To	Type
MF	Dino Baggio	Parma F.C.	
MF	Andreas Möller	Borussia Dortmund	
DF	Julio Cesar	Borussia Dortmund	
MF	Roberto Galia	Ascoli	
FW	Zoran Ban	Os Belenenses	loan
MF	Gianluca Francesconi	Genoa C.F.C.	

==== Autumun ====
In
Pos.	Name	from	Type
DF	Alessandro Orlando	AC Milan	-

Out
Pos.	Name	To	Type
FW	Paolo Di Canio	AC Milan	
DF	Luigi Sartor	Vicenza	

== Competitions ==
Times from 1 July to 25 September 1994 and from 26 March to 30 June 1995 are UTC+2, from 25 September 1994 to 26 March 1995 UTC+1.

=== Serie A ===
==== League table ====
Pos	Team	Pld	W	D	L	GF	GA	GD	Pts	Qualification or relegation
1	Juventus (C)	34	23	4	7	59	32	+27	73	Qualified to Champions League
2	Parma	34	18	9	7	51	31	+20	63	Qualification to Cup Winners' Cup
3	Lazio	34	19	6	9	69	34	+35	63	Qualification to UEFA Cup
4	Milan	34	17	9	8	53	32	+21	60	Qualification to UEFA Cup
5	Roma	34	16	11	7	46	25	+21	59	Qualification to UEFA Cup

Source: Serie A, RSSSF.com, Soccerway
Rules for classification: 1) Points; 2) Head-to-head points; 3) Head-to-head goal difference; 4) Goal difference; 5) Goals scored; 6) Draw. (Note: Head-to-head record is used only after all the matches between the teams in question have been played).
(C) Champions

==== Results by round ====
Round	1	2	3	4	5	6	7	8	9	10	11	12	13	14	15	16	17	18	19	20	21	22	23	24	25	26	27	28	29	30	31	32	33	34	35
Ground	A	H	A	H	H	A	A	H	A	H	A	H	A	H	A	H	A	A	H	A	H	A	A	H	H	A	H	A	H	A	H	A	H	A	H
Result	D	W	W	W	D	L	W	W	-	W	W	W	W	D	W	W	L	L	W	W	W	W	D	W	W	W	L	W	L	W	L	W	W	L	W
Position	8	4	2	1	3	3	3	2	4	4	2	2	1	2	1	1	1	1	1	1	1	1	1	1	1	1	1	1	1	1	1	1	1	1	1

Source: Competitive matches
A = Away; H = Home; W = Win; D = Draw; L = Loss; = 1995–96 UEFA Champions League; = 1995–96 UEFA Cup

==== Matches ====
4 September 1994 1	Brescia	1–1	Juventus	Brescia
	Schenardi 80'	Report	Conte 55'	Stadium: Stadio Mario Rigamonti; Referee: Stefano Braschi

11 September 1994 2	Juventus	2–0	Bari	Turin
	Vialli 66'; Kohler 82'	Report		Stadium: Stadio delle Alpi; Referee: Giuseppe Rosica

18 September 1994 3	Napoli	0–2	Juventus	Naples
		Report	Ravanelli 32'; Del Piero 72'	Stadium: Stadio San Paolo; Referee: Pierluigi Collina

25 September 1994 4	Juventus	1–0	Sampdoria	Turin
	Di Livio 34'			Stadium: Stadio delle Alpi; Referee: Angelo Amendolia

2 October 1994 5	Juventus	0–0	Internazionale	Turin
		Report		Stadium: Stadio delle Alpi; Referee: Robert Anthony Boggi

16 October 1994 6	Foggia	2–0	Juventus	Foggia
	Bresciani 39', 76'	Report		Stadium: Stadio Pino Zaccheria; Referee: Graziano Cesari

23 October 1994 7	Cremonese	1–2	Juventus	Cremona
	Pedroni 80'	Report	Vialli 39'; R. Baggio 43'	Stadium: Stadio Giovanni Zini; Referee: Marcello Nicchi

30 October 1994 8	Juventus	1–0	Milan	Turin
	R. Baggio 43'	Report		Stadium: Stadio delle Alpi; Referee: Pierluigi Collina

6 November 1994 9	Torino	suspd.	Juventus	Turin
		Report		Stadium: Delle Alpi
Note: Match suspended due to bad weather conditions.

20 November 1994 10	Juventus	3–1	Reggiana	Turin
	Vialli 23', 68'; Del Piero 85'	Report	Padovano 4'	Stadium: Stadio delle Alpi; Referee: Virginio Quartuccio

27 November 1994 11	Padova	1–2	Juventus	Padua
	Kreek 68'	Report	30' 63' R. Baggio; 80' Ravanelli	Stadium: Stadio Euganeo; Referee: Giuseppe Rosica

4 December 1994 12	Juventus	3–2	Fiorentina	Turin
	Vialli 73', 76'; Del Piero 87'	Report	Baiano 24'; Carboni 35'	Stadium: Stadio delle Alpi; Referee: Loris Stafoggia

11 December 1994 13	Lazio	3–4	Juventus	Rome
	Rambaudi 20'; Casiraghi 83'; Fuser 90'	Report	Del Piero 37', 77'; Marocchi 53'; Grabbi 81'	Stadium: Stadio Olimpico; Referee: Livio Bazzoli

18 December 1994 14	Juventus	1–1	Genoa	Turin
	Ravanelli 76'	Report	Galante 88'	Stadium: Stadio delle Alpi; Referee: Pasquale Rodomonti P.

8 January 1995 15	Parma	1–3	Juventus	Parma
	D. Baggio 57'	Report	Sousa 61'; Ravanelli 70', 74' (pen.)	Stadium: Stadio Ennio Tardini; Referee: Piero Ceccarini

15 January 1995 16	Juventus	3–0	Roma	Turin
	Ravanelli 32', 81' (pen.); Vialli 84'	Report		Stadium: Stadio delle Alpi; Referee: Loris Stafoggia

22 January 1995 17	Cagliari	3–0	Juventus	Cagliari
	Oliveira 6' (pen.); Dely Valdés 52'; Muzzi 65' (pen.)	Report		Stadium: Stadio Sant'Elia; Referee: Stefano Braschi

25 January 1995 9	Torino	3–2	Juventus	Turin
	Rizzitelli 6', 30'; Angloma 38'	Report	Vialli 8', 33'	Stadium: Stadio delle Alpi; Referee: Angelo Amendolia

29 January 1995 18	Juventus	2–1	Brescia	Turin
	Del Piero 34'; Vialli 89' (pen.)	Report	Corini 10' (pen.)	Stadium: Stadio delle Alpi; Referee: Salvatore Racalbuto

12 February 1995 19	Bari	0–2	Juventus	Bari
		Report	Del Piero 41' (pen.); Ferrara 90'	Stadium: Stadio San Nicola; Referee: Gianni Beschin

19 February 1995 20	Juventus	1–0	Napoli	Turin
	Ravanelli 78'	Report		Stadium: Stadio delle Alpi; Referee: Marcello Cardona

26 February 1995 21	Sampdoria	0–1	Juventus	Genoa
		Report	Vialli 80'	Stadium: Stadio Luigi Ferraris; Referee: Robert Anthony Boggi

5 March 1995 22	Internazionale	0–0	Juventus	Milan
		Report		Stadium: San Siro; Referee: Roberto Bettin

12 March 1995 23	Juventus	2–0	Foggia	Turin
	Ravanelli 57'; R. Baggio 63'	Report		Stadium: Stadio delle Alpi; Referee: Gianni Beschin

19 March 1995 24	Juventus	1–0	Cremonese	Turin
	Peruzzi 57'; Vialli 72'	Report		Stadium: Stadio delle Alpi; Referee: Cosimo Bolognino

1 April 1995 25	Milan	0–2	Juventus	Milan
		Report	Ravanelli 41'; Vialli 84'	Stadium: San Siro; Referee: Robert Anthony Boggi

9 April 1995 26	Juventus	1–2	Torino	Turin
	Maltagliati 23' (o.g.)	Report	Rizzitelli 6', 33'	Stadium: Stadio delle Alpi; Referee: Graziano Cesari

15 April 1995 27	Reggiana	1–2	Juventus	Reggio Emilia
	Padovano 26' (pen.)	Report	R. Baggio 6', 47'	Stadium: Stadio Giglio; Referee: Fiorenzo Treossi

23 April 1995 28	Juventus	0–1	Padova	Turin
		Report	Kreek 77'	Stadium: Stadio delle Alpi; Referee: Gennaro Borriello

29 April 1995 29	Fiorentina	1–4	Juventus	Florence
	Batistuta 70'	Report	Vialli 7'; R. Baggio 68' (pen.); Ravanelli 85'; Marocchi 86'	Stadium: Stadio Artemio Franchi; Referee: Loris Stafoggia

7 May 1995 30	Juventus	0–3	Lazio	Turin
		Report	Di Matteo 72'; Bokšić 89'; Venturin 90'	Stadium: Stadio delle Alpi; Referee: Marcello Nicchi

13 May 1995 31	Genoa	0–4	Juventus	Genoa
		Report	R. Baggio 52' (pen.); Ravanelli 62'; Jarni 80'; Vialli 90'	Stadium: Stadio Luigi Ferraris; Referee: Pierluigi Collina

21 May 1995 32	Juventus	4–0	Parma	Turin
	Ravanelli 11', 68'; Deschamps 37'; Vialli 64'; R. Baggio 82'	Report		Stadium: Stadio delle Alpi; Referee: Piero Ceccarini

28 May 1995 33	Roma	3–0	Juventus	Rome
	Tacchinardi 10' (o.g.); Fonseca 70' (pen.); Balbo 75'	Report		Stadium: Stadio Olimpico; Referee: Gianni Beschin

4 June 1995 34	Juventus	3–1	Cagliari	Turin
	Del Piero 20'; Vialli 66'; Ravanelli 88'	Report	Allegri 60'	Stadium: Stadio delle Alpi; Referee: Marcello Nicchi

=== Coppa Italia ===
==== Second round ====
31 August 1994 1	Juventus	0–0	Chievo	Turin
20:30 CEST (UTC+02:00)				Stadium: Stadio delle Alpi; Referee: Angelo Bonfrisco

21 September 1994 2	Chievo	1–3 (1–3 agg.)	Juventus	Verona
20:30 CEST (UTC+02:00)	Antonioli 69'		Del Piero 1'; Ravanelli 12' (pen.), 76' (pen.)	Stadium: Stadio Marc'Antonio Bentegodi; Referee: Robert Boggi

==== Third round ====
12 October 1994 1	Juventus	2–0	Reggiana	Turin
20:30 CEST (UTC+02:00)	Baggio 16'; Marocchi 55'			Stadium: Stadio delle Alpi; Referee: Stefano Braschi

26 October 1994 2	Reggiana	2–1 (2–3 agg.)	Juventus	Reggio Emilia
20:30 CET (UTC+01:00)	Sgarbossa 74'; Cherubini 80'		Vialli 69'	Stadium: Stadio Mirabello; Referee: Livio Bazzoli

==== Quarter-finals ====
1 December 1994 1	Juventus	3–0	Roma	Turin
20:30 CET (UTC+01:00)	Vialli 23', 35'; Ravanelli 90+1' (pen.)			Stadium: Stadio delle Alpi; Referee: Paolo Ceccarini

14 December 1994 2	Roma	3–1 (3–4 agg.)	Juventus	Rome
20:30 CET (UTC+01:00)	Marocchi 22' (o.g.); Totti 37'; Cappioli 69'		Ravanelli 29' (pen.)	Stadium: Stadio Olimpico; Referee: Robert Boggi

==== Semi-finals ====
8 March 1995 1	Lazio	0–1	Juventus	Rome
20:30 CET (UTC+01:00)			Ravanelli 84'	Stadium: Stadio Olimpico; Referee: Marcello Nicchi

11 April 1995 2	Juventus	2–1 (3–1 agg.)	Lazio	Turin
20:30 CEST (UTC+02:00)	Marocchi 47'; Baggio 90+1' (pen.)		Sousa 14' (o.g.)	Stadium: Stadio delle Alpi; Referee: Stefano Braschi

==== Final ====
7 June 1995 1	Juventus	1–0	Parma	Turin
20:30 CEST (UTC+02:00)	Porrini 10'			Stadium: delle Alpi; Referee: Angelo Amendolia

11 June 1995 2	Parma	0–2 (0–3 agg.)	Juventus	Parma
20:30 CEST (UTC+02:00)			Porrini 26'; Ravanelli 54'	Stadium: Il Tardini; Referee: Pierluigi Collina

=== UEFA Cup ===
==== First round ====
13 September 1994 1	CSKA Sofia (Bulgaria)	0–3 (Awarded)	(Italy) Juventus	Sofia, Bulgaria
18:00 CEST (UTC+02:00)	Radukanov (yellow card) 27', (goal) 70'; Mihtarski 44', 82'; Filipov (yellow card) 63'	Report	Tacchinardi (yellow card) 17'; Vialli (yellow card) 32'; Porrini 39'; Del Piero 76'	Stadium: Balgarska Armia Stadium; Referee: Kurt Röthlisberger (Sweden)
Note: UEFA invalidated this game and awarded a 3–0 win to Juventus because CSKA fielded an ineligible player, Petar Mihtarski

27 September 1994 2	Juventus (Italy)	5–1 (8–1 agg.)	(Bulgaria) CSKA Sofia	Turin, Italy
20:30 CEST (UTC+02:00)	Ravanelli 10', 76', 80', 84', 86', (yellow card) 23'	Report	Tanev (yellow card) 6'; Matchev (yellow card) 13'; Goranov (yellow card) 70'; Mihtarski 90'	Stadium: Stadio delle Alpi; Referee: Sándor Puhl (Hungary)

==== Second round ====
18 October 1994 1	Marítimo (Portugal)	0–1	(Italy) Juventus	Funchal, Portugal
22:00 CEST (UTC+02:00)		Report	Porrini (yellow card) 28'; Ravanelli 78'	Stadium: Estádio dos Barreiros; Referee: José María García-Aranda (Spain)

2 November 1994 2	Juventus (Italy)	2–1 (3–1 agg.)	(Portugal) Marítimo	Turin, Italy
17:45 CET (UTC+01:00)	Porrini (yellow card) 2'; Ravanelli 34', 52'; Fusi (yellow card) 47'; Sousa (yellow card) 83'	Report	Nascimento (yellow card) 52'; Paulo Alves 80'	Stadium: Stadio delle Alpi; Referee: Rémi Harrel (France)

==== Third round ====
24 November 1994 1	Admira Wacker (Austria)	1–3	(Italy) Juventus	Vienna, Austria
19:30 CET (UTC+01:00)	Schiener (yellow card) 3'; Graf (yellow card) 30'; Zingler (yellow card) 52'; Binder 55'	Report	Conte 8', (yellow card) 58'; R. Baggio 15', 41'; Ravenelli (yellow card) 61'; Rampulla (yellow card) 62'	Stadium: Bundesstadion Südstadt; Referee: Leslie Mottram (Scotland)

6 December 1994 2	Juventus (Italy)	2–1 (5–2 agg.)	(Austria) Admira Wacker	Turin, Italy
20:30 CET (UTC+01:00)	Ferrara 17'; Del Piero (yellow card) 62'; Carrera (yellow card) 85'; Vialli 86'	Report	Klausz (yellow card) 5'; Panis (yellow card) 43'; Wimmer 73'	Stadium: Stadio delle Alpi; Referee: Nikolai Levnikov (Russia)

==== Quarter-finals ====
28 February 1995 1	Eintracht Frankfurt (Germany)	1–1	(Italy) Juventus	Frankfurt, Germany
17:15 CET (UTC+01:00)	Dickhaut (yellow card) 19'; Furtok 74'; Okocha (yellow card) 85'; Roth (yellow card) 88'	Report	Torricelli (yellow card) 12'; Porrini (yellow card) 17'; Marocchi 37'; Carrera (yellow card) 63'	Stadium: Waldstadion; Referee: Peter Mikkelsen (Denmark)

14 March 1995 2	Juventus (Italy)	3–0 (4–1 agg.)	(Germany) Eintracht Frankfurt	Turin, Italy
18:00 CET (UTC+01:00)	Conte 77', (yellow card) 77'; Ravanelli 87'; Del Piero 90'	Report	Bindewald (yellow card) 61'; Falkenmayer (yellow card) 70'	Stadium: Stadio delle Alpi; Referee: Manuel Diaz Vega (Spain)

==== Semi-finals ====
4 April 1995 1	Juventus (Italy)	2–2	(Germany) Borussia Dortmund	Milan, Italy
21:00 CEST (UTC+02:00)	Marocchi (yellow card) 5'; R. Baggio 28'; Ferrara (yellow card) 63'; Kohler 88'; Torricelli (red card) 90'	Report	Reuter 8', (yellow card) 25'; Möller (yellow card) 16', (goal) 71'; Riedle (yellow card) 40'; Zorc (yellow card) 60'; Klos (yellow card) 83'; Sammer (yellow card) 89'	Stadium: San Siro; Referee: Marc Batta (France)

18 April 1995 2	Borussia Dortmund (Germany)	1–2 (3–4 agg.)	(Italy) Juventus	Dortmund, Germany
20:30 CEST (UTC+02:00)	Júlio César 10'	Report	Porrini 6'; Ferrara (yellow card) 8'; R. Baggio 31'; Deschamps (yellow card) 41'; Ravanelli (yellow card) 60'; Di Livio (yellow card) 88'	Stadium: Westfalenstadion; Referee: Mario van der Ende (Netherlands)

==== Final ====
3 May 1995 1	Parma (Italy)	1–0	(Italy) Juventus	Parma, Italy
20:30 CEST (UTC+02:00)	D. Baggio 5'; Apolloni (yellow card) 16'; Pin (yellow card) 42'; Zola (yellow card) 54'; Sensini (yellow card) 60'	Report	Deschamps (yellow card) 61'; Tacchinardi (yellow card) 82'	Stadium: Stadio Ennio Tardini; Attendance: 22,062; Referee: Antonio López Nieto (Spain)

17 May 1995 2	Juventus (Italy)	1–1 (1–2 agg.)	(Italy) Parma	Milan, Italy
20:30 CEST (UTC+02:00)	Ravanelli (yellow card) 16'; Vialli 35', (yellow card) 43'; Ferrara (yellow card) 63'	Report	Couto (yellow card) 2'; Minotti (yellow card) 29'; Crippa (yellow card) 47'; D. Baggio 53'; Asprilla (yellow card) 72'; Castellini (yellow card) 86'	Stadium: San Siro; Attendance: 80,754; Referee: Frans van den Wijngaert (Belgium)

== Statistics ==
=== Players Statistics ===
No.	Pos	Nat	Player	Total		Serie A		Coppa		UEFA	
No.	Pos	Nat	Player	Apps	Goals	Apps	Goals	Apps	Goals	Apps	Goals
-	GK	(Italy) ITA	Peruzzi	43	-35	26	-22	8	-7	9	-6
-	DF	(Italy) ITA	Torricelli	41	0	23+3	0	6	0	9	0
-	DF	(Italy) ITA	Ferrara	49	2	33	1	7	0	9	1
-	DF	(Germany) GER	Kohler	29	2	19	1	5	0	5	1
-	DF	(Italy) ITA	Carrera	31	0	17+2	0	5	0	7	0
-	MF	(Italy) ITA	Di Livio	46	1	21+6	1	9	0	10	0
-	MF	(Portugal) POR	Paulo Sousa	42	1	26	1	6	0	10	0
-	MF	(Italy) ITA	Conte	32	3	22+1	1	4	0	5	2
-	FW	(Italy) ITA	Vialli	46	22	29+1	17	7	3	9	2
-	FW	(Italy) ITA	Del Piero	50	11	22+7	8	10	1	11	2
-	FW	(Italy) ITA	Ravanelli	53	30	31+2	15	9	6	11	9
-	GK	(Italy) ITA	Rampulla	17	-14	8+1	-10	4	0	4	-4
-	FW	(Italy) ITA	Baggio	29	14	17	8	4	2	8	4
-	MF	(Italy) ITA	Tacchinardi	38	0	14+10	0	7	0	7	0
-	MF	(Italy) ITA	Marocchi	47	5	13+13	2	10	2	11	1
-	MF	(France) FRA	Deschamps	23	1	13+1	1	3	0	6	0
-	DF	(Italy) ITA	Porrini	35	3	12+7	0	8	2	8	1
-	DF	(Italy) ITA	Orlando	18	0	10+3	0	5	0	0	0
-	DF	(Croatia) CRO	Jarni	30	1	9+6	1	6	0	9	0
-	DF	(Italy) ITA	Fusi	22	0	9+1	0	6	0	6	0
-	DF	(Italy) ITA	Sartor	1	0	0	0	1	0	0	0
-	FW	(Italy) ITA	Grabbi	4	1	0+2	1	1	0	1	0
-	GK	(Italy) ITA	Squizzi	2	0	0+1	0	1	0	0	0
-	MF	(Italy) ITA	Tognon	1	0	0+1	0	0	0	0	0
-	FW	(Italy) ITA	Fantini	1	0	0+1	0	0	0	0	0
-	DF	(Italy) ITA	Loria	0	0	0	0	0	0	0	0
-	DF	(Italy) ITA	Fortunato	0	0	0	0	0	0	0	0

- Source: http://calcio-seriea.net/presenze/1994/1073/
