= Dino Baggio =

Italian footballer (born 1971)

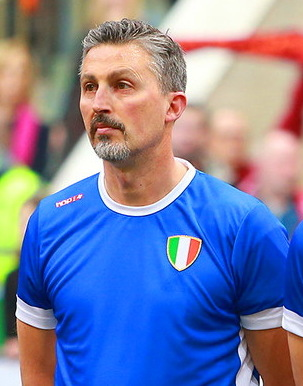
- Baggio in 2018

Personal information
- Full name: Dino Baggio
- Date of birth: 24 July 1971 (age 55)
- Place of birth: Camposampiero, Italy
- Height: 1.88 m (6 ft 2 in)
- Position: Midfielder

Youth career
- 1976–1984: Tombolo
- 1984–1990: Torino

Senior career*
Years	Team	Apps	(Gls)
1989–1992	Torino	28	(2)
1991–1992	→ Inter Milan (loan)	27	(1)
1992–1994	Juventus	49	(2)
1994–2000	Parma	172	(19)
2000–2005	Lazio	44	(1)
2003	→ Blackburn Rovers (loan)	9	(1)
2004	→ Ancona (loan)	9	(1)
2005	Triestina	13	(0)
2008–2009	Tombolo	1	(0)
Total		351	(26)

International career
1990–1992	Italy U21	18	(1)
1991–1999	Italy	60	(7)
Medal record
Men's Football
Representing Italy
UEFA European Under-21 Championship
Winner	1992
FIFA World Cup
Runner-up	1994
- * Club domestic league appearances and goals

Dino Baggio (born 24 July 1971) is an Italian former professional footballer who played as a defensive midfielder.

Throughout his career, he played for several Italian clubs, and won the UEFA Cup three times, twice with Parma and once with Juventus. He also had a spell in England with Blackburn Rovers. At international level, he obtained 60 caps for Italy between 1991 and 1999, scoring seven goals, and was part of the team that reached the final of the 1994 FIFA World Cup; he later also represented Italy at UEFA Euro 1996, and at the 1998 FIFA World Cup.

Despite sharing a last name, he has no relation to fellow Italian former footballer and teammate Roberto Baggio.

== Club career ==
=== Early career: Youth career, Torino, and Inter ===
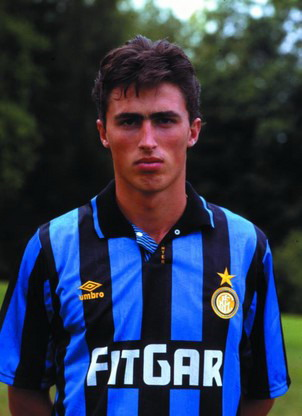
Baggio with Inter Milan in 1991

Baggio began his football career at age five in Tombolo, a comune in the province of Padua. He was spotted by Torino scouts at the age of 13 and taken into the Torino youth system. He made his debut in Serie A as a 19-year-old against Lazio and became a regular member of the starting line-up, making a name for himself as a promising youngster. He emerged as a tenacious, hardworking, consistent, and versatile defensive midfielder during his time at the club, who was capable of playing in several positions. With Torino, he won the 1989–90 Serie B title, followed by the 1991 Mitropa Cup. He was loaned to Inter Milan at the age of 20 in 1991 for the 1991–92 season, making 27 appearances and scoring 1 goal.

=== Rise to prominence: Juventus ===
At the end of the 1991–92 season, Juventus bought the promising youngster for 10 billion Italian Lire, and during his time at the club, Dino Baggio would play alongside his unrelated namesake Roberto Baggio for two seasons, forming a notable friendship; Dino was often called "Baggio 2" or "the other Baggio" earlier on in his career, to distinguish the two players, as he was younger, and initially less well-known. As Dino Baggio had previously played for city rivals Torino, however, the Juventus fans were not initially pleased by the transfer. His solid and consistent play soon won them over, however, and he quickly became a mainstay in the Juventus midfield, winning the UEFA Cup in 1993, scoring three goals over the two legs of the final; one of his goals came in the first leg, while the other two came in the return leg. He also helped Juventus to a second-place finish in Serie A during the 1993–94 season.

=== Domestic and international success: Parma ===
After Baggio's performances in the 1994 FIFA World Cup and with Juventus, Parma attempted to acquire the midfielder. Baggio initially rejected Parma's offer, stating his intention to stay at Juventus. At the time, Juventus were ready to offer Parma a young forward named Alessandro Del Piero instead of Baggio, in order to retain their defensive midfielder; Parma accepted the offer, but before the transfer could be finalised, Dino Baggio changed his mind, and decided he would make the move to Parma. Del Piero stayed with Juventus, and the following season he underwent a breakthrough with the club, later going on to become a club legend.

Baggio moved to Parma at the beginning of the 1994–95 season for 14 billion Lire. During his first season with his new club under Nevio Scala, he immediately won the UEFA Cup, for the second time in his career, scoring a goal in each leg of the 1995 final against his former team, Juventus, increasing his UEFA Cup Final goal tally to five goals. He also reached the final of the Coppa Italia that season, losing out to his former club, also narrowly missing on the Serie A title to his former club, once again, finishing the league season in third place. Despite their European success under Malesani, Parma were unable to win the Serie A title during these years, with their best finish occurring during the 1996–97 season, where they managed a second-place finish, under manager Carlo Ancelotti.

In a match during the 1998–99 UEFA Cup, Baggio was wounded in the head by a knife thrown by a Wisła Kraków supporter in Kraków, which resulted in Wisła being suspended from European cup play for a year. He would go on to win his third UEFA Cup that season, over Olympique Marseille, also winning the Coppa Italia over Fiorentina, followed by the 1999 Supercoppa Italiana over 1998–99 Serie A champions Milan.

Baggio stayed with Parma until the end of the 1999–2000 season, helping the club to a fourth-place finish, and narrowly missing out on an UEFA Champions League spot following a play-off defeat to Inter. During his final season with the club, he also gained notoriety for a particular incident in a home match against his former club, Juventus, on 9 January 2000. Baggio committed a foul on Gianluca Zambrotta, and was shown a controversial straight red card by referee Stefano Farina. In protest, Baggio made the "money sign" towards the referee, and subsequently spat on the ground close to Farina. Baggio was criticised for his behaviour, and was handed a two match ban, in addition to being fined 20 million lire, by his club, for the gesture. He was also prevented by Luciano Nizzola, the FIGC president at the time, from taking part in Italy's friendly match against Sweden, on 23 February 2000.

=== Later career ===
In October 2000, Baggio was sold to the newly crowned Serie A champions Lazio for 10 billion Italian lire, along with Nestor Sensini. He was utilized very little during his time at the club in the 2001–02 and the 2002–03 seasons, and the club failed to win any silverware. At the beginning of the 2003–04 season, he was in talks with English club Wolverhampton, who were newly promoted to the FA Premier League, over a possible loan deal, but negotiations fell through; he was eventually loaned to English club Blackburn Rovers for the season in September 2003, following an impressive trial with the team. He made his first appearance for the club as a substitute in a 3–1 home defeat to Liverpool in the Premier League on 13 September, while his first start for the team came on 24 September, in a 3–1 away defeat to Gençlerbirliği, in the first round of the UEFA Cup; the following month, the team exited the competition following a 1–1 draw in the second leg, during which Baggio made a substitute appearance, replacing compatriot Corrado Grabbi. Baggio's manager at Blackburn, Graeme Souness, employed him in an unfamiliar forward role occasion, however, which had a negative impact on his performances. Baggio made 9 appearances for the club in total, scoring once in the league in a 2–1 defeat against Leeds United. Due to his negative performances throughout the first half of the season, Souness attempted to have Baggio return to Italy on loan to newly promoted Serie A side Ancona in January 2004, but the player initially rejected the deal. Soon afterwards, however Lazio loaned him out to Ancona. He made 15 appearances and scored 2 goals, but Ancona finished dead last. He remained with Lazio in 2004–05 season, but did not make a single appearance for the club that season. He retired in 2005 after a short spell with Serie B side Triestina, at the age of 34. In February 2008 it was announced that Dino Baggio decided to come back from retirement and join the Terza Categoria side Tombolo — a team near his hometown, coached by his very first coach, Cesare Crivellaro.

== International career ==
At youth international level, Baggio won the 1992 European U-21 Championship with the "Azzurrini", and in the same year, he took part in the 1992 Summer Olympics in Barcelona with the Italian Under-23 side, under manager Cesare Maldini. Baggio made his international debut with the senior Italian squad under Arrigo Sacchi, on 21 December 1991, at the age of 20, in a 2–0 victory against Cyprus, in Foggia. He featured in the match along with fellow debutant Demetrio Albertini, who would play alongside Baggio in midfield with Italy for much of the 1990s. On 24 February, he scored his first goal for Italy, in Oporto, against Portugal.

After representing Italy during their 1994 FIFA World Cup qualifying campaign, notably scoring the winning goal against Portugal, which allowed Italy to qualify for the tournament, Baggio was named a member of Italy's 1994 FIFA World Cup squad under Arrigo Sacchi. In his first World Cup, he combined with his unrelated namesake Roberto Baggio; together, they helped Italy to reach the 1994 World Cup final, scoring decisive goals, only to lose to Brazil on penalties. Dino scored two goals in the tournament: his first was a decisive match-winning header, assisted by Giuseppe Signori, in Italy's first-round 1–0 victory over Norway, and his second was the opening goal in a 2–1 win against Spain in the quarter-finals, which came from a strike from distance, assisted by Roberto Donadoni. In the final, he started in midfield against Brazil alongside Albertini in the team's 4–4–2 formation, but was later replaced in extra-time by Alberico Evani; following a 0–0 draw, the match went to a penalty shoot-out, which saw Brazil emerge victorious, with Baggio's namesake Roberto missing the decisive final kick. According to FIFA.com, the lack of attacking play in the match was in part down to strong holding midfield play by Dino Baggio for Italy, and Dunga and Mauro Silva for Brazil.

Baggio would continue to play in other tournaments for Italy throughout the 1990s, such as Euro '96, in which the Italians were eliminated in the first round. Baggio also played in every game for Italy at the 1998 World Cup under Cesare Maldini, which would prove to be his last major tournament with the Azzurri; Italy were eliminated on penalties once again by hosts and eventual champions France, after reaching the quarter-finals of the tournament. Baggio was initially in Dino Zoff's provisional 26-man Italy squad for Euro 2000, before missing the final cut. He made his final appearance for Italy on 13 November 1999, in a 3–1 home defeat to Belgium in an international friendly match.

In total, Baggio amassed 60 caps and scored 7 goals for the Italy national team between 1991 and 1999. He is remembered as a notable international player of the 90s by the Italian fans due to his World Cup performances, and as he was able to obtain a first-team midfield spot over many other talented players in their prime, such as Roberto Donadoni, Luigi Di Biagio, Demetrio Albertini, Roberto Di Matteo, Nicola Berti, Alberigo Evani, Attilio Lombardo, Diego Fuser, Francesco Moriero, Sandro Cois, Stefano Fiore, Fernando De Napoli, Antonio Conte, Angelo Di Livio, Gianluca Pessotto, Carlo Ancelotti, Giancarlo Marocchi, Giuseppe Giannini, Giuseppe Signori, Roberto Baggio, Roberto Mancini, and Gianfranco Zola, among others.

== Style of play ==
Baggio was a well-rounded and tactically versatile player, who primarily played as a defensive midfielder, but was capable of playing in various other midfield positions, such as a central midfielder or a box-to-box midfielder, and was deployed in every position on the pitch throughout his career. His height, aggression, positional sense and reliable distribution enabled him to break down the opposition's attacking plays, and aid his team creatively to counter-attack after winning back possession.

Baggio was regarded as one of the greatest Italian players of his generation, and as one of the most consistent midfielders in Serie A during the 90s. Despite functioning primarily as a ball-winner, who would then supply the ball to more creative midfielders, he was also able to contribute offensively and score goals due to his ability to make late attacking runs into the area, as well as his proficiency in the air and his accuracy with his head; he also had a penchant for scoring from powerful, accurate shots and volleys from distance, courtesy of his striking ability, in particular from outside the penalty box. Because of his eye for goal, he was occasionally deployed out of position as a striker by his manager Souness during his time with Blackburn.

== Career statistics ==
=== Club ===
Appearances and goals by club, season and competition
Club	Season	League			National Cup		League Cup		Continental		Total	
Club	Season	Division	Apps	Goals	Apps	Goals	Apps	Goals	Apps	Goals	Apps	Goals
Torino	1989–90	Serie B	3	0	0	0	—		—		3	0
Torino	1990–91	Serie A	25	2	6	0	—		—		31	2
Torino	Total		28	2	6	0	0	0	0	0	34	2
Inter Milan	1991–92	Serie A	27	1	5	1	—		—		32	2
Juventus	1992–93	Serie A	32	1	7	3	—		9	5	48	9
Juventus	1993–94	Serie A	17	0	2	0	—		6	0	25	0
Juventus	Total		49	1	9	3	0	0	15	5	73	9
Parma	1994–95	Serie A	31	6	7	1	—		11	5	49	12
Parma	1995–96	Serie A	28	4	2	0	—		4	1	34	5
Parma	1996–97	Serie A	31	2	1	0	—		2	0	34	2
Parma	1997–98	Serie A	29	5	6	0	—		8	0	43	5
Parma	1998–99	Serie A	29	2	5	0	—		8	0	42	2
Parma	1999–2000	Serie A	24	0	1	0	1 (Note: Includes appearance in Serie A UEFA Champions League play-offs.)	0	9	1	35	1
Parma	2000–01	Serie A	0	0	2	0	—		1	0	3	0
Parma	Total		172	19	24	1	1	0	43	7	240	27
Lazio	2000–01	Serie A	25	1	1	0	—		—		26	1
Lazio	2001–02	Serie A	15	0	3	0	—		3	0	21	0
Lazio	2002–03	Serie A	4	0	3	0	—		8	0	15	0
Lazio	Total		44	1	7	0	0	0	11	0	62	1
Blackburn Rovers	2003–04	Premier League	9	1	0	0	0	0	2	0	11	1
Ancona (loan)	2003–04	Serie A	13	0	0	0	—		—		13	0
Triestina	2005–06	Serie B	3	0	0	0	—		—		3	0
Career total			345	25	51	5	1	0	71	12	468	42

=== International ===
Appearances and goals by national team and year
National team	Year	Apps	Goals
Italy	1991	1	0
Italy	1992	1	0
Italy	1993	7	3
Italy	1994	15	4
Italy	1995	5	0
Italy	1996	4	0
Italy	1997	11	0
Italy	1998	11	0
Italy	1999	5	0
Total		60	7

Scores and results list Italy's goal tally first, score column indicates score after each Baggio goal.

List of international goals scored by Dino Baggio
No.	Date	Venue	Opponent	Score	Result	Competition
1	24 February 1993	Estádio das Antas, Porto, Portugal	Portugal	1–0	3–1	1994 FIFA World Cup qualification
2	24 March 1993	La Favorita, Palermo, Italy	Malta	1–0	6–1	1994 FIFA World Cup qualification
3	17 November 1993	San Siro, Milan, Italy	Portugal	1–0	1–0	1994 FIFA World Cup qualification
4	23 March 1994	Gottlieb-Daimler-Stadion, Stuttgart, Germany	Germany	1–0	1–2	Friendly
5	23 June 1994	Giants Stadium, East Rutherford, United States	Norway	1–0	1–0	1994 FIFA World Cup
6	9 July 1994	Foxboro Stadium, Foxborough, United States	Spain	1–0	2–1	1994 FIFA World Cup
7	16 November 1994	La Favorita, Palermo, Italy	Croatia	1–2	1–2	UEFA Euro 1996 qualifying

== Honours ==
Torino

- Serie B: 1989–90
- Mitropa Cup: 1991

Juventus

- UEFA Cup: 1992–93

Parma

- Coppa Italia: 1998–99
- Supercoppa Italiana: 1999
- UEFA Cup: 1994–95, 1998–99

Italy U-21

- UEFA European Under-21 Championship: 1992

Italy

- FIFA World Cup runner-up: 1994
