= Carsten Dethlefsen =

Danish footballer (born 1969)

Personal information
- Full name: Carsten Dethlefsen
- Date of birth: 18 January 1969 (age 57)
- Place of birth: Hamburg, West Germany
- Height: 1.88 m (6 ft 2 in)
- Position: Left-back

Youth career
- Aabenraa Boldklub

Senior career*
Years	Team	Apps	(Gls)
- Haderslev FK
1992–1998	OB	130	(1)
1998–1999	Viborg	22	(0)

International career
1994	Denmark	1	(0)
- * Club domestic league appearances and goals

Carsten Dethlefsen (born 18 January 1969) is a Danish former professional footballer, who played as a defender for Odense BK. He played a single match for the Danish national team, against England in 1994. He was the male Denmark team's first black player.

== Early life ==
Dethlefsen was born in Hamburg, West Germany to a Liberian father and a German mother. At the age of 1, he was adopted by a Danish couple and raised in Denmark.

== Club career ==
Dethlefsen signed for Odense BK in 1992 and spent six seasons with the club. He played in OB's famous upset of Real Madrid in the 1994–95 UEFA Cup. After playing for Viborg FF in the 1998–99 season, Dethlefsen was forced into retirement by a serious ankle injury.

== International career ==
In March 1994, Dethlefsen made his debut for Denmark, the reigning European Champions, in a 1–0 friendly defeat by England at Wembley Stadium. In the pre-match press conference national team coach Richard Møller Nielsen quipped: "He may be dark, but his football future is bright".

== Honours ==
- Danish Cup: 1993
