= Simone Tognon =

Italian footballer

Personal information
- Date of birth: 25 June 1975 (age 51)
- Place of birth: Padua, Italy
- Height: 1.82 m (6 ft 0 in)
- Position: Midfielder

Senior career*
Years	Team	Apps	(Gls)
1993–1994	Sparta Novara		
1994–1995	Juventus	1	(0)
1995–1996	SPAL		
1996–1997	Rimini		
1997	Prato		
1997–1998	Padova		
1998–2001	Monselice		
2001–2004	Este		

Managerial career
- Este
- Abano
- * Club domestic league appearances and goals

Simone Tognon (born 25 June 1975) is an Italian former professional footballer who played as a midfielder. He made one Serie A appearance for Juventus in 1995. After his playing career, he became a manager and scout.

== Honours ==
Juventus

- Serie A: 1994–95
