= Roberto Magnani =

Italian footballer (born 1977)

Personal information
- Date of birth: 13 January 1977 (age 49)
- Place of birth: Parma, Italy
- Height: 1.78 m (5 ft 10 in)
- Position: Midfielder

Senior career*
Years	Team	Apps	(Gls)
1994–1995	Parma	1	(0)
1995–1996	Ancona	22	(0)
1996–1997	Modena	17	(0)
1997–1999	Gualdo	52	(1)
1999–2000	Messina	20	(1)
2000–2001	Brescello	28	(1)
2001–2003	Treviso	57	(2)
2003	Vicenza	6	(0)
2004	Prato	13	(0)
2004–2005	Cisco Lodigiani–Roma	11	(0)
2005	Reggiana	2	(0)
2006–2007	Sassari Torres	26	(0)
2007–2008	Albignasego		
2008–2010	Crociati Noceto	52	(2)

International career^{‡}
1994–1995	Italy U-18	10	(3)
- * Club domestic league appearances and goals as of 21:02, 5 May 2010 (UTC) ‡ National team caps and goals as of July 22, 1995

Roberto Magnani (born January 13, 1977, in Parma) is an Italian former professional footballer who played as a midfielder.

He played one game in Serie A for Parma F.C. during the 1994–95 season.

He represented Italy at the 1995 UEFA European Under-19 Football Championship where they won silver medals.
