= Diego Pellegrini =

Italian footballer (born 1970)

Personal information
- Full name: Diego Pellegrini
- Date of birth: 21 November 1970 (age 55)
- Place of birth: Latina, Italy
- Height: 1.82 m (6 ft 0 in)
- Position: Defender

Senior career*
Years	Team	Apps	(Gls)
1986–1987	Pro Cisterna	1	(0)
1987–1993	Empoli	94	(1)
1993–1994	Vicenza	14	(0)
1994–1995	Parma	1	(0)
1995–1998	Ancona	90	(4)
1998–1999	Perugia	9	(0)
1999–2001	Savoia	64	(1)
2001–2002	Sambenedettese	32	(2)
2002–2003	Adelaide City	31	(1)
2003	Lodigiani	15	(0)
2004–2006	Mantova	49	(3)
2006–2009	Adelaide Blue Eagles	51	(3)
2013	Eastern United	0	(0)
Total		451	(15)

International career^{‡}
1990–1991	Italy U-21	3	(0)

Managerial career
- 2006–2007: Adelaide Blue Eagles
- 2012–: Eastern United
- * Club domestic league appearances and goals as of 20 February 2012 ‡ National team caps and goals as of 20 February 2012

Diego Pellegrini (born 21 November 1970) is a retired Italian footballer who played as a midfielder. He last played for the Adelaide Blue Eagles in the FFSA Super League. He was a founding member of Eastern United Football Club in Adelaide. Eastern United became part of the football federation under his guidance
