= Roberto Sensini =

Argentine footballer & manager (born 1966)

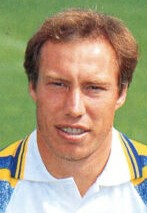
- Sensini in 1995

Personal information
- Full name: Roberto Néstor Sensini
- Date of birth: 12 October 1966 (age 60)
- Place of birth: Arroyo Seco, Argentina
- Height: 1.78 m (5 ft 10 in)
- Positions: Centre-back; defensive midfielder

Senior career*
Years	Team	Apps	(Gls)
1986–1989	Newell's Old Boys	74	(2)
1989–1993	Udinese	149	(9)
1993–1999	Parma	156	(11)
1999–2000	Lazio	24	(1)
2000–2002	Parma	35	(0)
2002–2006	Udinese	91	(7)
Total		529	(30)

International career
1996	Argentina Olympic (O.P.)	5	(0)
1987–2000	Argentina	60	(0)

Managerial career
- 2006: Udinese
- 2007–2008: Estudiantes LP
- 2009–2011: Newell's Old Boys
- 2012–2013: Colón
- 2014–2015: Atlético Rafaela
- 2020–2021: Everton Viña del Mar
Medal record
Men's football
Representing Argentina
FIFA World Cup
Runner-up	1990 Italy
Olympic Games
Silver medal – second place	1996 Atlanta	Team
- * Club domestic league appearances and goals

Roberto Néstor Sensini (born 12 October 1966) is an Argentine football manager and former player, who played as a centre-back or defensive midfielder. As a player with the Argentina national team, he finished third place in the 1989 Copa América edition of the tournament. He also represented his nation in the 1990, 1994 and 1998 FIFA World Cup finals, finishing in runner-up at the 1990 World Cup. Furthermore, he won an Olympic silver medal with Argentina at the 1996 Olympics.

== Club career ==
His professional playing career started in 1986 for Newell's Old Boys; where he won his first title before relocating to Italy in 1989, joining Udinese alongside compatriot Abel Balbo. Sensini played four seasons for the bianconeri, before moving to Parma in 1993, where he remained for a further six seasons. During this period Sensini sometimes played in midfield and won two UEFA Cups, two Italian Cups, and the UEFA Super Cup with the gialloblu, also reaching the final of the European Cup Winners' Cup in 1994. He had a brief stint with Lazio, from the 1999–2000 season, winning the scudetto, the Italian Cup, the UEFA Super Cup and the Supercoppa Italiana in his first season. After two years with the club, he moved back to Parma for a further year, winning another Coppa Italia in 2002, before returning to his first Italian club, Udinese, in 2002.

In 2005, he was one of the most consistent performers in Udinese's surprise qualification for the UEFA Champions League. Sensini was one of the oldest players of the 2005–06 Serie A, holding even the record as the oldest foreign player to score a goal in first division, at the age of 39 years, two months and 26 days. With over 380 matches at the top level, he was considered one of the most experienced defenders of the Italian league, and often nicknamed nonno (grandfather) by Italian sports journalists. He retired at the end of the season.

== International career ==
"Boquita" Sensini debuted for his national team in 1987, and played his last match in 2000. He played in the World Cup 1990, 1994 and 1998. In the 1990 FIFA World Cup Final Sensini conceded the disputed penalty kick from which West Germany scored their winning goal. He helped his country to finish third-place at 1989 Copa América.

He was part of the Argentina under-23 squad that won the silver medal at the 1996 Summer Olympics in Atlanta, as one of the three overage players allowed per squad.

== Style of play ==
Sensini was a consistent, decisive, and intelligent player. He was also extremely tactically versatile, and was capable of playing in any defensive or midfield position. Throughout his career, he was deployed as a full-back, an attacking wing-back, a centre-back, or even as a central or defensive midfielder. Although he primarily excelled defensively as a ball winner, due to his marking and tackling ability, as well as his tough, aggressive, and physical playing style, he was also a player with good technique, who was capable of making attacking runs and contributing offensively for his team with occasional goals. Considered one of the best players of the 1990s and 2000s.

== Managerial career ==
On 10 February 2006, after the dismissal of Serse Cosmi, Sensini ended his playing career and was appointed Udinese's new manager. He was supported in his new position by Loris Dominissini, who was named co-coach. The following month when Dominissini was sacked, Sensini resigned and left the club. Results had not improved with the team in danger of relegation, while they were defeated in the UEFA Cup by Bulgarian team Levski Sofia.

For the Argentine Torneo Clausura 2008, Sensini coached Estudiantes de La Plata, having replaced Diego Simeone. Sensini then went on to manage Newell's Old Boys for the Clausura 2009 tournament. In April 2011, he resigned after two years as head coach of Newell's Old Boys after Lepra's sixth loss in nine games, leaving them 19th in the Clausura table.

On 21 February 2012, Sensini was appointed as the new head coach of Argentine first division club Colón. He resigned on 16 March 2013 after a 1–0 loss against rivals San Lorenzo, following a row of eight matches without winning.

== Personal life ==
In 1996, Sensini took Italian citizenship. He is an Italian Argentine, whose grandfather Pacifico Sensini emigrated from Macerata to Rosario, Santa Fe in 1911.

== Career statistics ==
=== Club ===
Club	Season	League			Cup		Continental		Other		Total	
Club	Season	Division	Apps	Goals	Apps	Goals	Apps	Goals	Apps	Goals	Apps	Goals
Udinese	1989–90	Serie A	33	2	1	0	—		—		34	2
Udinese	1990–91	Serie B	36	4	—		—		—		36	4
Udinese	1991–92	Serie B	36	2	4	0	—		—		40	2
Udinese	1992–93	Serie A	33	1	2	0	—		1 (Note: Appearance in Serie A relegation play-offs)	0	36	1
Udinese	1993–94	Serie A	11	0	3	0	—		—		14	0
Udinese	Total		149	9	10	0	—		1	0	159	9
Parma	1993–94	Serie A	20	0	6	0	5	1	2 (Note: Two appearances and one goal in European Super Cup)	1	33	2
Parma	1994–95	Serie A	24	2	8	1	10	0	—		42	3
Parma	1995–96	Serie A	31	2	1	0	6	0	1 (Note: Appearance in Supercoppa Italiana)	0	39	2
Parma	1996–97	Serie A	31	1			2	0	—		33	1
Parma	1997–98	Serie A	24	5	3	0	6	3	—		33	8
Parma	1998–99	Serie A	26	1	8	0	10	0	—		44	1
Parma	Total	Serie A	156	11	26	1	39	4	3	1	224	17
Lazio	1999–2000	Serie A	23	1	2	0	7	0	—		32	1
Lazio	2000–01	Serie A	1	0	2	1	3	0	1	0	7	1
Lazio	Total		24	1	4	1	10	0	1	0	39	2
Parma	2000–01	Serie A	19	0	4	0	—		—		23	0
Parma	2001–02	Serie A	16	0	3	0	6	1	—		25	1
Parma	Total		35	0	7	0	6	1	0	0	48	1
Udinese	2002–03	Serie A	31	3	1	0	—		—		32	3
Udinese	2003–04	Serie A	25	2			1	0	—		26	2
Udinese	2004–05	Serie A	21	1	3	0	—		—		24	1
Udinese	2005–06	Serie A	14	1			5	0	—		19	1
Udinese	Total		91	7	4	0	6	0	0	0	101	7
Career total			455	28	51	2	61	5	1	0	571	36

== Managerial statistics ==
As of 4 December 2021

Team	From	To	Record							
Team	From	To	G	W	D	L	GF	GA	GD	Win %
Udinese	10 February 2006	20 March 2006	8	4	3	1	12	5	+7	50.00
Estudiantes de La Plata	1 January 2008	18 September 2008	35	17	10	8	50	37	+13	48.57
Newell's Old Boys	1 January 2009	10 April 2011	93	34	31	28	111	91	+20	36.56
Colón	21 February 2012	16 March 2013	48	15	17	16	64	62	+2	31.25
Atlético de Rafaela	18 July 2014	31 March 2015	29	9	7	13	13	31	−18	31.03
Everton	20 December 2020	6 December 2021	50	17	16	17	46	50	−4	34.00
Career total			263	96	84	83	311	282	+29	36.50

== Honours ==
Newell's Old Boys

- Argentine Primera División: 1987–88
- Copa Libertadores runner-up: 1988

Parma

- Coppa Italia: 1998–99, 2001–02
- UEFA Cup: 1994–95, 1998–99
- UEFA Super Cup: 1993
- Serie A runner-up: 1996-97
- UEFA Cup Winners' Cup runner-up: 1993–94

Lazio

- Serie A: 1999–2000
- Coppa Italia: 1999–2000
- Supercoppa Italiana: 2000
- UEFA Super Cup: 1999

Argentina

- FIFA World Cup runner-up: 1990
- Summer Olympic Games Silver Medal: 1996
