= Massimo Susic =

Italian footballer

Personal information
- Date of birth: 11 March 1967 (age 59)
- Place of birth: Mossa, Italy
- Height: 1.84 m (6 ft 0 in)
- Position: Defender

Senior career*
Years	Team	Apps	(Gls)
1985–1987	Udinese	26	(0)
1987–1990	Parma	37	(0)
1987–1988	→ Messina (loan)	24	(1)
1988–1989	→ Udinese (loan)	14	(0)
1990–1992	Udinese	33	(1)
1992–1994	Pisa	69	(2)
1994–1996	Parma	9	(0)
1996–1997	Cremonese	32	(2)
1997–1999	Treviso	65	(2)
1999–2000	Monza	19	(0)
2001	Triestina	14	(0)
Total		342	(8)
- * Club domestic league appearances and goals

Massimo Susic (born 11 March 1967 in Mossa) is an Italian former professional footballer who played as a defender.

== Honours ==
Parma

- UEFA Cup: 1994–95
