= Fernando Couto =

Portuguese footballer (born 1969)

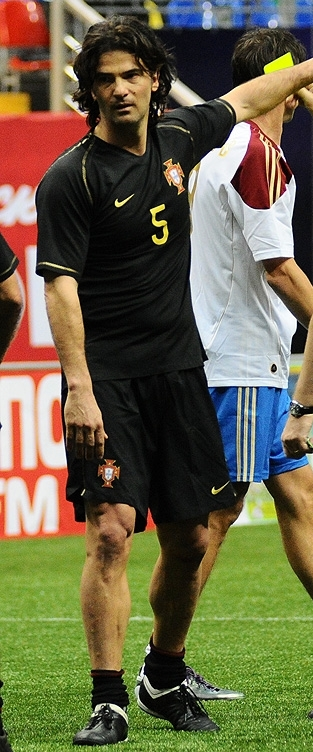
- Couto in 2011

Personal information
- Full name: Fernando Manuel Silva Couto
- Date of birth: 2 August 1969 (age 57)
- Place of birth: Espinho, Portugal
- Height: 1.84 m (6 ft 0 in)
- Position: Centre back

Youth career
- 1980–1985: Espinho
- 1985–1986: Lourosa
- 1986–1988: Porto

Senior career*
Years	Team	Apps	(Gls)
1988	Porto	1	(0)
1988–1989	Famalicão	17	(1)
1989–1990	Académica	23	(2)
1990–1994	Porto	106	(19)
1994–1996	Parma	39	(4)
1996–1998	Barcelona	44	(0)
1998–2005	Lazio	145	(9)
2005–2008	Parma	63	(1)
Total		438	(36)

International career
1989	Portugal U20	4	(0)
1989–1990	Portugal U21	7	(1)
1990–2004	Portugal	110	(8)

Managerial career
- 2012–2014: Braga (assistant)
Medal record
Men's football
Representing Portugal
UEFA European Championship
Runner-up	2004 Portugal
Bronze medal – third place	2000 Belgium-Netherlands
FIFA U-20 World Cup
Winner	1989 Saudi Arabia
- * Club domestic league appearances and goals

Fernando Manuel Silva Couto OIH (Portuguese: [fɨɾˈnɐ̃du ˈkotu]; born 2 August 1969) is a Portuguese former professional footballer who played as a centre back.

During a 21-year professional career, he played in a number of top clubs in Portugal, Spain and Italy (12 seasons in the latter country), appearing in nearly 600 competitive matches and winning the double in each country, as well as three UEFA trophies.

At international level, Couto represented the Portugal national team in 110 games, taking part in the 2002 World Cup as well as three European Championships.

== Club career ==
Born in Espinho near Porto, Couto joined FC Porto's youth system at the age of 17. On 2 June 1988, he made his first-team – and Primeira Liga – debut, playing 90 minutes in a 1–0 away win against Académica de Coimbra in what would be his only appearance of the season for the national champions. He was then released, spending one year apiece with F.C. Famalicão and Académica.

Couto returned to Porto in 1990, being an instrumental defensive unit in the conquest of six titles during his four-year spell. He subsequently moved to Italy with Parma AC, scoring a career-best four goals in 27 games in his first season and adding the campaign's UEFA Cup, in a 2–1 aggregate victory over fellow Serie A side Juventus FC

In summer 1996, Couto signed a four-year deal with FC Barcelona, moving alongside former Porto teammate Vítor Baía and English manager Bobby Robson as Luís Figo was also playing for the La Liga club. Regularly used during his early stint, he was less played by the next coach Louis van Gaal, but managed to appear in one of the two European finals the Catalans won, the 1996–97 edition of the UEFA Cup Winners' Cup.

After two seasons at the Camp Nou, Couto left Barça and joined Rome's SS Lazio in late June 1998 as teammate Iván de la Peña. He appeared in 22 matches in his first year to help his team to the second place in the league, and featured one minute in the final of the last Cup Winners' Cup, in a 2–1 win against RCD Mallorca at the Villa Park in Birmingham.

In 2001, Couto failed a doping test for the steroid nandrolone. He denied having taken forbidden substances, but his "B" test confirmed the finding and he eventually served four months out of a nine-month worldwide ban for the offence. He continued to appear regularly for Lazio in the following seasons.

In 2005, aged 36, Couto returned to Parma after 11 years as Lazio was unable to match his wage demands for a contract renewal. After two seasons of regular use he played just 17 matches in 2007–08, with the Emilia-Romagna side also suffering top-flight relegation; as his contract expired, he decided to retire from football.

In June 2010, two years after his retirement, Couto was named general manager at S.C. Braga. He was appointed the club's assistant manager for the 2012–13 campaign, leaving in February 2014.

== International career ==
As a member of Famalicão in the third division, Couto appeared in four matches as Portugal won the 1989 FIFA World Youth Championship, being part of a group of players dubbed the "Golden Generation" of Portuguese football. He made his debut for the senior team on 19 December 1990, in a friendly with the United States played in Maia (1–0 win).

Always as first choice, Couto represented the nation at UEFA Euro 1996– scoring the game's only goal for the eventual quarter-finalists in a group stage fixture against Turkey– Euro 2000 and the 2002 FIFA World Cup, partnering former Porto teammate Jorge Costa in the last two tournaments, the latter of which ended in group stage exit.

Couto became the first Portuguese player to reach 100 caps (in a total of 110) on 11 October 2003, in a 5–3 friendly defeat of Albania. He was selected as captain for Euro 2004, which was played on home soil, starting in the first game against Greece but eventually being relegated to the bench by Ricardo Carvalho; Portugal went on to reach the final of the tournament, in which the team suffered a defeat against the same opponent.

== Style of play ==
Considered as one of the greatest Portuguese defenders ever, Couto usually played as a centre-back in zonal-marking system during his time with Porto, where he earned a reputation for being a tough and physical defender, with an aggressive and hard-tackling playing style. He was also known for his ability in the air, as well as his capacity to start quick attacking plays after winning back the ball. During his time in Italy, he also adapted himself to different tactical systems; under his Parma manager Nevio Scala, he featured as a man-marking centre-back – or stopper – on occasion, or even as a sweeper behind the back-line.

== Career statistics ==
=== Club ===
Appearances and goals by club, season and competition
Club	Season	League			Cup		Europe		Other (Note: Includes the Supercoppa Italiana, Supertaça Cândido de Oliveira and UEFA Super Cup)		Total	
Club	Season	Division	Apps	Goals	Apps	Goals	Apps	Goals	Apps	Goals	Apps	Goals
Porto	1987–88	Primeira Divisão	1	0	0	0	—		—		1	0
Famalicão	1988–89						—		—			
Académica	1989–90	Segunda Divisão	23	2	1	0	—		—		24	2
Porto	1990–91	Primeira Divisão	24	3	6	0	4	0	0	0	34	3
Porto	1991–92	Primeira Divisão	32	2	5	0	4	0	3	0	44	2
Porto	1992–93	Primeira Divisão	26	4	3	0	7	2	2	0	38	6
Porto	1993–94	Primeira Divisão	23	1	5	0	9	0	2	0	39	1
Porto	Total		105	10	19	0	24	2	7	0	155	12
Parma	1994–95	Serie A	27	4	9	2	8	1	—		44	7
Parma	1995–96	Serie A	12	0	0	0	2	0	1	0	15	0
Parma	Total		39	4	9	2	10	1	1	0	59	7
Barcelona	1996–97	La Liga	26	0	5	1	4	1	0	0	35	2
Barcelona	1997–98	La Liga	18	0	2	0	5	0	0	0	25	0
Barcelona	Total		44	0	7	1	9	1	0	0	60	2
Lazio	1998–99	Serie A	22	2	5	0	8	0	1	0	36	2
Lazio	1999–00	Serie A	14	0	5	0	7	0	0	0	26	0
Lazio	2000–01	Serie A	18	0	4	0	8	0	0	0	30	0
Lazio	2001–02	Serie A	29	1	2	0	4	0	—		35	1
Lazio	2002–03	Serie A	15	0	4	0	12	1	—		31	1
Lazio	2003–04	Serie A	23	3	4	1	4	0	—		41	3
Lazio	2004–05	Serie A	24	3	0	0	3	0	1	0	28	3
Lazio	Total		145	9	24	1	46	1	2	0	217	11
Parma	2005–06	Serie A	23	0	1	0	—		—		24	0
Parma	2006–07	Serie A	23	1	1	0	2	0	—		26	1
Parma	2007–08	Serie A	17	0	1	0	—		—		18	0
Parma	Total		63	1	3	0	2	0	—		68	1
Career total			420	26	62	4	91	5	10	0	583	35

=== International ===
Appearances and goals by national team and year
National team	Year	Apps	Goals
Portugal	1990	1	0
Portugal	1991	5	0
Portugal	1992	6	0
Portugal	1993	8	1
Portugal	1994	2	1
Portugal	1995	7	0
Portugal	1996	11	3
Portugal	1997	6	0
Portugal	1998	5	1
Portugal	1999	7	0
Portugal	2000	14	0
Portugal	2001	6	0
Portugal	2002	11	0
Portugal	2003	12	1
Portugal	2004	7	1
Total		110	8

Scores and results list Portugal's goal tally first, score column indicates score after each Couto goal.

List of international goals scored by Fernando Couto
No.	Date	Venue	Opponent	Score	Result	Competition
1	24 February 1993	Estádio das Antas, Porto, Portugal	Italy	1–2	1–3	1994 World Cup qualification
2	18 December 1994	Estádio da Luz (1954), Lisbon, Portugal	Liechtenstein	5–0	8–0	Euro 1996 qualifying
3	24 January 1996	Parc des Princes, Paris, France	France	0–1	3–2	Friendly
4	14 June 1996	City Ground, Nottingham, England	Turkey	1–0	1–0	UEFA Euro 1996
5	9 November 1996	Estádio das Antas, Porto, Portugal	Ukraine	1–0	1–0	1998 FIFA World Cup qualification
6	18 November 1998	Estádio do Bonfim, Setúbal, Portugal	Israel	1–0	2–0	Friendly
7	10 June 2003	Estádio Nacional, Lisbon, Portugal	Bolivia	2–0	4–0	Friendly
8	5 June 2004	Estádio do Bonfim, Setúbal, Portugal	Lithuania	1–0	4–1	Friendly

== Honours ==
Porto

- Primeira Divisão: 1987–88, 1991–92, 1992–93
- Taça de Portugal: 1990–91, 1993–94
- Supertaça Cândido de Oliveira: 1991, 1993

Parma

- UEFA Cup: 1994–95

Barcelona

- La Liga: 1997–98
- Copa del Rey: 1996–97, 1997–98
- Supercopa de España: 1996
- UEFA Cup Winners' Cup: 1996–97
- UEFA Super Cup: 1997

Lazio

- Serie A: 1999–2000
- Coppa Italia: 1999–2000, 2003–04
- Supercoppa Italiana: 1998, 2000
- UEFA Cup Winners' Cup: 1998–99
- UEFA Super Cup: 1999

Portugal U20

- FIFA U-20 World Cup: 1989

Portugal

- UEFA European Championship runner-up: 2004

Orders

- Medal of Merit, Order of the Immaculate Conception of Vila Viçosa (House of Braganza)

== See also ==
- List of footballers with 100 or more caps
- List of doping cases in sport
