= Stadio Delle Alpi =

Former sports venue in Turin, Italy

Stadio delle Alpi
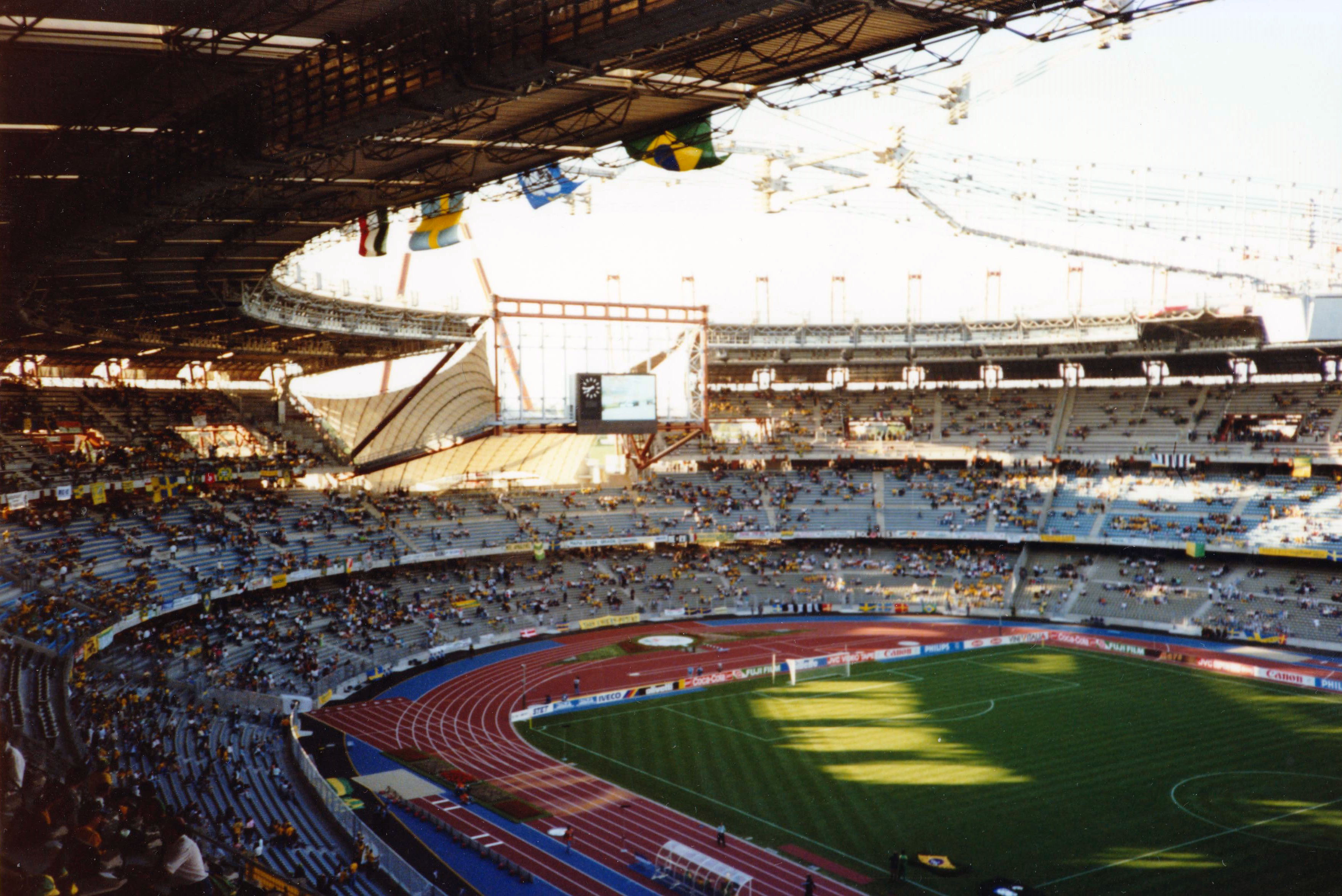
- Interactive map of Stadio delle Alpi
- Location: Turin, Italy
- Coordinates: 45°06′34.42″N 7°38′28.54″E
- Owner: City of Turin (1990–2002); Juventus (2002–2009)
- Capacity: 69,000
- Surface: Grass
- Field size: 105 m × 68 m

Construction
- Groundbreaking: March 1988
- Opened: 31 May 1990
- Closed: 11 June 2006
- Demolished: March 2009
- Cost: €200 million
- Architect: Studio Hutter

Tenants
- Juventus (1990–2006); Torino (1990–2006)

The Stadio delle Alpi was a football and athletics stadium in Turin, Italy, and was the home of both Juventus Football Club and Torino Football Club between 1990 and 2006. In English, the name meant "Stadium of the Alps", a reference to the nearby Alps mountain range. The stadium was demolished in 2009 and both football clubs moved to the rebuilt Stadio Olimpico. A new stadium for Juventus, the Juventus Stadium, was constructed on the site of the former Delle Alpi and opened in 2011.

Designed by architect Studio Hutter, the Stadio delle Alpi was originally built in 1990 to host matches for the 1990 FIFA World Cup as a replacement for the aging Stadio Olimpico, then known as the Stadio Comunale. The stadium's original capacity was 69,041 fans. However, due to FIFA rules regarding the segregation of home and away supporters, the actual capacity was reduced to 67,229.

== History ==
Construction on the stadium began in June 1988, and due to the use of prefabricated concrete, was complete within two years. The Delle Alpi was built by the council of Turin, with both of the city's football clubs using it as their home ground following the closure of the Stadio Olimpico. It was originally intended to be used for not only football but also athletics. Therefore, an athletics track was constructed around the outside of the pitch. However, due to the lack of a warm-up track, the stadium was never used for a major athletics event.

The stadium was inaugurated on 31 May 1990 when a joint Juventus–Torino team defeated Porto 4–3. Due to escalating rental costs, disputes arose between the clubs and the city council. In 1994, the Juventus board investigated building a new stadium, which would be owned by the club. The UEFA Cup semi-final and final matches in 1994–95 were moved by Juventus to the San Siro in Milan, attracting an audience of 85,000. The Stadio Delle Alpi was very rarely sold out in its history. Finally, in June 2002, Juventus purchased the Delle Alpi from the Turin city council for a fee of around €25 million.

Torino was banned from playing any Serie A matches inside the stadium from 9 March 2003 until 30 June 2003 due to the violence that occurred on 22 February 2003 inside the stadium clash against Milan.

== Attendance ==
The stadium attendance record was 63,583 set during a UEFA Champions League semi-final (second leg) between Juventus and Real Madrid on 14 May 2003. During the 1990 FIFA World Cup, the stadium hosted (among others) a second round match between Argentina and Brazil, as well as a semi-final between West Germany and England. Both matches attracted around 60,000 fans.

The Delle Alpi's design was widely criticised due to the poor visibility. This was caused mainly by the distance between the stands and the pitch due to the athletics running track. Views from the lower tier were also restricted due to the positioning of advertising hoardings. The stadium's location on the outskirts of town never found favour with fans, and the stadium design left spectators exposed to the elements. These factors contributed to attendances significantly below its capacity; in the 2005–06 season, for example, Juventus' average attendance was 35,880. In the Coppa Italia home match against Sampdoria in the 2001–02 season, only 237 spectators showed up.

Season	Juventus average	Torino average
1990–91	43,114	33,990
1991–92	51,832	35,364
1992–93	45,868	26,814
1993–94	44,520	26,130
1994–95	47,866	22,205
1995–96	41,946	20,284
1996–97	39,271	13,451
1997–98	47,347	19,505
1998–99	47,164	19,627
1999–2000	42,229	21,857
2000–01	41,273	17,077
2001–02	40,687	19,002
2002–03	39,771	14,870
2003–04	34,365	9,831
2004–05	26,429	10,003
2005–06	25,987	24,995

== 1990 FIFA World Cup ==
The stadium was one of the venues of the 1990 World Cup, hosting five matches. The first four involved Brazil; All their Group C matches (a 2–1 win over Sweden on 10 June, a 1–0 win over Costa Rica on 16 June and a 1–0 win over Scotland on 20 June) and their round of 16 match against Argentina on 24 June, a 1–0 defeat. The fifth match was the semi-final between West Germany and England on 4 July, with the match ending 1–1 but West Germany winning 4–3 on penalties.

== Milestone matches ==
11 June 2006 Final match 2005–06 Serie B	Torino	3–1	Mantova
20:45 CEST	Rosina 36' (pen.); Muzzi 63'; Nicola 95'		Poggi 101' (pen.)	Attendance: 58,560; Referee: Stefano Farina

== Redevelopment ==
The Stadio Delle Alpi was demolished, with plans for a 41,475-seater venue and a number of restaurants and other facilities outside the ground. The new grounds of the stadium covers around 50,000 square metres. The demolition was completed in February 2009.

Work on the replacement, Juventus Stadium, began during spring 2009 and it was opened on 8 September 2011, at the start of the 2011–12 season. No longer required to incorporate a running track as in the Stadio Delle Alpi, the new stadium's stands are covered by a roof and are much closer to the pitch action. A new Juventus training centre was also built next to the stadium, together with a set of buildings for a gymnasium, a restaurant and a hotel.
