= 1999–2000 Serie A =

98th season of top-tier Italian football

Serie A
- Season: 1999–2000
- Dates: 28 August 1999 – 14 May 2000
- Champions: Lazio; 2nd title
- Relegated: Torino; Venezia; Cagliari; Piacenza
- Champions League: Lazio; Juventus; Milan; Internazionale
- UEFA Cup: Parma; Roma; Fiorentina
- Intertoto Cup: Udinese; Perugia
- Matches: 306
- Goals: 764 (2.5 per match)
- Top goalscorer: Andriy Shevchenko (24 goals)

The 1999–2000 Serie A (known as the Serie A TIM for sponsorship reasons) was the 98th season of top-tier Italian football, the 68th in a round-robin tournament. It was contested by 18 teams.

By late March, Juventus topped the table by nine points over Lazio with only eight games remaining, but they lost to Milan, to Lazio at the Stadio delle Alpi, and to Hellas Verona, with Lazio only dropping two points, against Fiorentina. Lazio won the title on the final day of the season when Juventus lost their match against Perugia 1–0 on an almost flooded pitch, while Lazio comfortably beat Reggina 3–0 at home at the Stadio Olimpico.

== Teams ==
Serie A 1999-2000 team distribution

Hellas Verona, Torino, Lecce and Reggina had been promoted from Serie B.

== Personnel and sponsorship ==
Team	Head coach	Kit manufacturer	Shirt sponsor
Bari	(Italy) Eugenio Fascetti	Lotto	TELE+
Bologna	(Italy) Francesco Guidolin	Diadora	Granarolo
Cagliari	(Italy) Renzo Ulivieri	Biemme	Pecorino Sardo
Fiorentina	(Italy) Giovanni Trapattoni	Fila	Toyota
Hellas Verona	(Italy) Cesare Prandelli	Errea	Salumi Marsili
Internazionale	(Italy) Marcello Lippi	Nike	Pirelli
Juventus	(Italy) Carlo Ancelotti	Kappa	D+
Lazio	(Sweden) Sven-Göran Eriksson	Puma	Cirio
Lecce	(Italy) Alberto Cavasin	Asics	Banca 121
Milan	(Italy) Alberto Zaccheroni	Adidas	Opel
Parma	(Italy) Alberto Malesani	Champion	Parmalat
Perugia	(Italy) Carlo Mazzone	Galex	Perugina
Piacenza	(Italy) Maurizio Braghin	Lotto	Copra (H)/Gruppo DAC (A)
Roma	(Italy) Fabio Capello	Diadora	INA Assitalia
Reggina	(Italy) Franco Colomba	Asics	Caffè Mauro
Torino	(Italy) Emiliano Mondonico	Kelme	SDA Express Courier
Udinese	(Italy) Luigi De Canio	Diadora	Telit
Venezia	(Italy) Francesco Oddo	Kronos	Emmezeta

== League table ==
Pos	Team	Pld	W	D	L	GF	GA	GD	Pts	Qualification or relegation
1	Lazio (C)	34	21	9	4	64	33	+31	72	Qualification to Champions League first group stage
2	Juventus	34	21	8	5	46	20	+26	71	Qualification to Champions League first group stage
3	Milan	34	16	13	5	65	40	+25	61	Qualification to Champions League third qualifying round
4	Internazionale (Note: Internazionale entered the 2000–01 UEFA Champions League after winning the UEFA Champions League qualification match against Parma.)	34	17	7	10	58	36	+22	58	Qualification to Champions League third qualifying round
5	Parma	34	16	10	8	52	37	+15	58	Qualification to UEFA Cup first round
6	Roma	34	14	12	8	57	34	+23	54	Qualification to UEFA Cup first round
7	Fiorentina (Note: Fiorentina gained entry to the 2000–01 UEFA Cup as both 1999–2000 Coppa Italia finalists had qualified for the 2000–01 UEFA Champions League.)	34	13	12	9	48	38	+10	51	Qualification to UEFA Cup first round
8	Udinese	34	13	11	10	55	45	+10	50	Qualification to Intertoto Cup third round
9	Hellas Verona	34	10	13	11	40	45	−5	43	
10	Perugia (Note: Perugia gained entry to the 2000 UEFA Intertoto Cup as Hellas Verona had declined to enter.)	34	12	6	16	36	52	−16	42	Qualification to Intertoto Cup second round
11	Reggina	34	9	13	12	31	42	−11	40 (Note: REG: 9 pts; BOL: 4 pts → BOL 2–0 LEC; LEC: 4 pts → LEC 1–1 BOL)	
12	Bologna	34	9	13	12	32	39	−7	40	
13	Lecce	34	10	10	14	33	49	−16	40	
14	Bari	34	10	9	15	34	48	−14	39	
15	Torino (R)	34	8	12	14	35	47	−12	36	Relegation to Serie B
16	Venezia (R)	34	6	8	20	30	60	−30	26	Relegation to Serie B
17	Cagliari (R)	34	3	13	18	29	54	−25	22	Relegation to Serie B
18	Piacenza (R)	34	4	9	21	19	45	−26	21	Relegation to Serie B

Source: Serie A, RSSSF.com, Soccerway
Rules for classification: 1) Points; 2) Head-to-head points; 3) Head-to-head goal difference; 4) Goal difference; 5) Goals scored; 6) Draw. (Note: Head-to-head record is used only after all the matches between the teams in question have been played).
(C) Champions; (R) Relegated

== Results ==
Home \ Away	BAR	BOL	CAG	FIO	INT	JUV	LAZ	LCE	MIL	PAR	PER	PIA	REG	ROM	TOR	UDI	VEN	VER
Bari		1–1	1–0	1–0	2–1	1–1	0–0	3–1	1–1	0–1	0–2	3–2	1–1	0–0	1–1	1–1	3–0	1–1
Bologna	1–0		1–0	0–0	3–0	0–2	2–3	2–0	2–3	1–0	2–1	0–0	0–1	1–0	0–0	2–1	1–1	0–0
Cagliari	2–3	2–2		1–1	0–2	0–1	0–0	0–0	0–0	2–3	2–1	3–0	0–1	1–0	1–1	0–3	1–1	0–1
Fiorentina	1–0	2–2	2–0		2–1	1–1	3–3	3–0	2–1	0–2	1–0	2–1	1–0	1–3	1–1	1–1	3–0	4–1
Internazionale	3–0	1–1	2–1	0–4		1–2	1–1	6–0	1–2	5–1	5–0	2–1	1–1	2–1	1–1	3–0	3–0	3–0
Juventus	2–0	2–0	1–1	1–0	1–0		0–1	1–0	3–1	1–0	3–0	1–0	1–1	2–1	3–2	4–1	1–0	1–0
Lazio	3–1	3–1	2–1	2–0	2–2	0–0		4–2	4–4	0–0	1–0	2–0	3–0	2–1	3–0	2–1	3–2	4–0
Lecce	1–0	1–1	2–1	0–0	1–0	2–0	0–1		2–2	0–0	0–1	0–1	2–1	0–0	2–1	1–0	2–1	2–1
Milan	4–1	4–0	2–2	1–1	1–2	2–0	2–1	2–2		2–1	3–1	1–0	2–2	2–2	2–0	4–0	3–0	3–3
Parma	2–1	1–1	3–1	0–4	1–1	1–1	1–2	4–1	1–0		1–2	1–0	3–0	2–0	4–1	0–0	3–1	3–0
Perugia	1–2	3–2	3–0	1–2	1–2	1–0	0–2	2–2	0–3	1–1		2–0	2–1	2–2	1–0	0–5	2–1	0–0
Piacenza	2–1	0–0	1–1	2–0	1–3	0–2	0–2	1–1	0–1	1–2	0–0		0–0	1–1	0–2	0–1	2–2	1–0
Reggina	1–0	1–0	1–1	2–2	0–1	0–2	0–0	2–1	1–2	2–2	1–1	1–0		0–4	2–1	0–0	1–0	1–1
Roma	3–1	2–0	2–2	4–0	0–0	0–1	4–1	3–2	1–1	0–0	3–1	2–1	0–2		1–0	1–1	5–0	3–1
Torino	3–1	2–1	1–1	1–0	0–1	0–0	2–4	1–2	2–2	2–2	0–1	2–1	2–1	1–1		0–1	2–1	0–3
Udinese	5–1	2–1	5–2	1–1	3–0	1–1	0–3	2–1	1–2	0–1	2–1	3–0	3–2	0–2	0–0		5–2	3–3
Venezia	0–1	0–1	3–0	2–1	1–0	0–4	2–0	0–0	1–0	0–2	1–2	0–0	2–0	1–3	2–2	1–1		2–2
Hellas Verona	0–1	0–0	2–0	2–2	1–2	2–0	1–0	2–0	0–0	4–3	2–0	1–0	1–1	2–2	0–1	2–2	1–0	

Source: lega-calcio.it (in Italian)
Legend: Blue = home team win; Yellow = draw; Red = away team win.

== UEFA Champions League qualification ==
23 May 2000
20:30 CEST

Internazionale	3–1	Parma
Baggio 35', 73'; Zamorano 89'		Stanić 69'

Stadio Marcantonio Bentegodi, Verona
Attendance: 25,000
Referee: Graziano Cesari (Genoa)

Internazionale qualified to 2000–01 UEFA Champions League's third qualifying round, while Parma qualified to the 2000–01 UEFA Cup first round.

== Top goalscorers ==
Rank	Player	Club	Goals
1	(Ukraine) Andriy Shevchenko	Milan	24
2	(Argentina) Gabriel Batistuta	Fiorentina	23
3	(Argentina) Hernán Crespo	Parma	22
4	(Italy) Marco Ferrante	Torino	18
4	(Italy) Vincenzo Montella	Roma	18
6	(Italy) Filippo Inzaghi	Juventus	15
6	(Italy) Cristiano Lucarelli	Lecce	15
6	(Italy) Giuseppe Signori	Bologna	15
9	(Italy) Christian Vieri	Internazionale	13
10	(Italy) Roberto Muzzi	Udinese	12
10	(Chile) Marcelo Salas	Lazio	12

== Attendances ==
#	Club	Avg. attendance	Highest
1	Internazionale	66,546	79,677
2	Roma	58,915	77,988
3	Milan	58,522	82,146
4	Lazio	51,956	74,076
5	Juventus	42,229	57,586
6	Fiorentina	35,683	39,855
7	Bologna	28,492	36,317
8	Reggina	24,158	27,272
9	Torino	21,857	47,344
10	Parma	20,938	29,748
11	Bari	20,802	45,000
12	Udinese	20,391	33,501
13	Lecce	19,278	35,017
14	Hellas Verona	18,141	43,521
15	Cagliari	16,934	25,541
16	Perugia	13,194	27,000
17	Piacenza	10,763	19,928
18	Venezia	9,545	12,312

== References and sources ==
- Almanacco Illustrato del Calcio – La Storia 1898-2004, Panini Edizioni, Modena, September 2005
