= 1997–98 UC Sampdoria season =

Sampdoria
1997–98 season
- President: Enrico Mantovani
- Manager: César Luis Menotti (until 10 November 1997); Vujadin Boškov
- Stadium: Stadio Luigi Ferraris
- Serie A: 9th
- Coppa Italia: Round of 16
- UEFA Cup: First round
- Top goalscorer: League: Vincenzo Montella (20); All: Vincenzo Montella (21)
Home colours	Away colours	Third colours

Unione Calcio Sampdoria finished ninth in Serie A, despite the absence of club stalwart Roberto Mancini, who had followed coach Sven-Göran Eriksson to Lazio. Former Argentine World Cup-winning coach César Luis Menotti took charge, but failed to match the results of Eriksson, and was replaced by the 1991 championship winning coach Vujadin Boškov, who guided the team to a safe mid-table slot.

== Players ==
Note: Flags indicate national team as defined under FIFA eligibility rules; some limited exceptions apply. Players may hold more than one non-FIFA nationality.

No.	Pos.	Nation	Player
1	GK	ITA	Fabrizio Ferron
2	DF	ITA	David Balleri
3	DF	POR	Hugo
4	MF	ITA	Marco Franceschetti
5	DF	ITA	Moreno Mannini
6	DF	ITA	Marcello Castellini
7	DF	ITA	Emanuele Pesaresi
8	MF	FRA	Pierre Laigle
9	FW	ITA	Vincenzo Montella
10	MF	ARG	Ángel Morales
11	DF	YUG	Siniša Mihajlović
12	GK	ITA	Marco Ambrosio
13	FW	ITA	Sandro Tovalieri
14	MF	FRA	Alain Boghossian

No.	Pos.	Nation	Player
15	MF	ITA	Fausto Salsano
16	MF	FRA	Christian Karembeu
17	MF	ITA	Alessandro Lamonica
18	FW	GER	Jürgen Klinsmann
19	MF	ITA	Simone Vergassola
20	MF	ARG	Juan Sebastián Verón
21	MF	ITA	Alessio Scarchilli
22	GK	ITA	Giovanni Sanino
23	FW	ENG	Daniele Dichio
24	DF	SEN	Oumar Dieng
25	DF	ITA	Nicola Zanini
27	FW	BRA	Paco Soares
29	FW	ITA	Giuseppe Signori
30	DF	ITA	Stefano Nava
31	FW	CMR	François Omam-Biyik

=== Transfers ===
In
Pos.	Name	from	Type
FW	Jürgen Klinsmann	Bayern Munich	
MF	Ángel Morales	CA Independiente	-
MF	Alain Boghossian	SSC Napoli	-
FW	Sandro Tovalieri	Cagliari Calcio	
GK	Marco Ambrosio	AC Prato	
GK	Giovanni Sanino		
DF	Hugo	SC Braga	-
DF	Marcello Castellini	Perugia Calcio	-
MF	Alessio Scarchilli	Torino	-
MF	Nicola Zanini	Hellas Verona	loan ended
FW	Daniele Dichio	Queen's Park Rangers	

Out
Pos.	Name	To	Type
FW	Roberto Mancini	SS Lazio	
MF	Alberigo Evani	Reggiana	
DF	Stefano Sacchetti	Piacenza Calcio	
GK	Matteo Sereni	Piacenza Calcio	loan
MF	Giovanni Invernizzi		retired
MF	Vincenzo Iacopino	Hellas Verona	loan
FW	Mattia Biso	Carrarese Calcio	loan
GK	Alessandro Giovinazzo		-
FW	Marco Carparelli	Torino	-
DF	Emiliano Milone		-

==== Winter ====
In
Pos.	Name	from	Type
FW	Giuseppe Signori	SS Lazio	loan
FW	François Omam-Biyik	Atletico Yucatan	
FW	Paco Soares	F.C. Motagua	
DF	Stefano Nava	Servette FC	-

Out
Pos.	Name	To	Type
MF	Christian Karembeu	Real Madrid	-
FW	Jürgen Klinsmann	Tottenham Hotspur	
FW	Sandro Tovalieri	Perugia Calcio	
MF	Nicola Zanini	Atalanta BC	-
MF	Ángel Morales	CP Merida	-

== Competitions ==
=== Serie A ===
==== League table ====
Pos	Team	Pld	W	D	L	GF	GA	GD	Pts	Qualification or relegation
7	Lazio	34	16	8	10	53	30	+23	56	Qualification to Cup Winners' Cup
8	Bologna	34	12	12	10	55	46	+9	48 (Note: Bologna finished ahead of Sampdoria on head-to-head points: BOL 2–2 SAM; SAM 2–3 BOL.)	Qualification to Intertoto Cup third round
9	Sampdoria	34	13	9	12	52	55	−3	48	Qualification to Intertoto Cup second round
10	Milan	34	11	11	12	37	43	−6	44	
11	Bari	34	10	8	16	30	45	−15	38	

Source: 1997–98 Serie A, RSSSF.com, Soccerway
Rules for classification: 1) Points; 2) Head-to-head points; 3) Head-to-head goal difference; 4) Goal difference; 5) Goals scored; 6) Draw. (Note: Head-to-head record is used only after all the matches between the teams in question have been played).

==== Results summary ====
Overall								Home						Away					
Pld	W	D	L	GF	GA	GD	Pts	W	D	L	GF	GA	GD	W	D	L	GF	GA	GD
34	13	9	12	52	55	−3	48	9	4	4	32	25	+7	4	5	8	20	30	−10

Source: Worldfootball

==== Results by round ====
Round	1	2	3	4	5	6	7	8	9	10	11	12	13	14	15	16	17	18	19	20	21	22	23	24	25	26	27	28	29	30	31	32	33	34
Ground	A	H	A	H	A	A	H	A	H	H	A	H	A	H	A	H	A	H	A	H	A	H	H	A	H	A	A	H	A	H	A	H	A	H
Result	W	D	W	D	L	W	L	L	W	D	D	L	W	D	W	W	D	D	W	W	L	L	L	L	L	W	L	L	W	W	W	D	D	L
Position	8	8	5	5	6	5	5	8	8	6	7	10	9	9	9	6	6	8	7	5	8	8	9	9	9	9	9	9	9	8	8	8	8	9

Source: Competitive matches
A = Away; H = Home; W = Win; D = Draw; L = Loss; = Leader, UEFA Champions League Groups stage; = UEFA Champions League Qualifying round; = 1998–99 UEFA Cup; = 1998 UEFA Intertoto Cup; = 1998–99 Serie B; w = 1998 UEFA Intertoto Cup

==== Matches ====
31 August 1997 1	Sampdoria	2–1	Vicenza	Genoa
	Boghossian 10'; Tovalieri 85'	Report	Di Napoli 53'	Stadium: Stadio Luigi Ferraris; Referee: Fiorenzo Treossi

13 September 1997 2	Brescia	3–3	Sampdoria	Brescia
	Hübner 4', 76', 84'	Report	Boghossian 54'; Montella 74', 80'	Stadium: Stadio Mario Rigamonti; Referee: Pierluigi Collina

21 September 1997 3	Atalanta	0–2	Sampdoria	Bergamo
		Report	Laigle 13'; Montella 64'	Stadium: Stadio Atleti Azzurri d'Italia; Referee: Pierluigi Pairetto

27 September 1997 4	Sampdoria	1–1	Juventus	Genoa
	Morales 16'	Report	Inzaghi 90+2'	Stadium: Stadio Luigi Ferraris; Referee: Robert Boggi

5 October 1997 5	Udinese	3–2	Sampdoria	Udine
	Calori 8'; Bierhoff 35'; Pierini 47'	Report	Montella 26'; Boghossian 39'	Stadium: Stadio Friuli; Referee: Piero Ceccarini

19 October 1997 6	Sampdoria	3–1	Piacenza	Genoa
	Tovalieri 44', 74'; Montella 52' (pen.)	Report	Dionigi 47' (pen.)	Stadium: Stadio Luigi Ferraris; Referee: Roberto Bettin

2 November 1997 7	Sampdoria	0–3	Milan	Genoa
		Report	Weah 75', 81'; Ziege 87'	Stadium: Stadio Luigi Ferraris; Referee: Alfredo Trentalange

9 November 1997 8	Lazio	3–0	Sampdoria	Rome
	Marcolin 25' (pen.); Nedved 65'; Bokšić 87'	Report		Stadium: Stadio Olimpico; Referee: Emilio Pellegrino

23 November 1997 9	Sampdoria	1–0	Bari	Genoa
	Mihajlović 84'	Report		Stadium: Stadio Luigi Ferraris; Referee: Pierangelo Pin

30 November 1997 10	Bologna	2–2	Sampdoria	Bologna
	Baggio 15' (pen.); Paramatti 48'	Report	Laigle 57'; Klinsmann 76'	Stadium: Stadio Renato Dall'Ara; Referee: Salvatore Racalbuto

6 December 1997 11	Sampdoria	1–1	Internazionale	Genoa
	Montella 31' (pen.)	Report	Ronaldo 9'	Stadium: Stadio Luigi Ferraris; Referee: Fiorenzo Treossi

14 December 1997 12	Empoli	4–1	Sampdoria	Empoli
	Tonetto 25'; Martusciello 40', 54'; Esposito 65'	Report	Franceschetti 9'	Stadium: Stadio Carlo Castellani; Referee: Daniele Tombolini

21 December 1997 13	Sampdoria	6–3	Napoli	Genoa
	Boghossian 35'; Montella 42' (pen.), 61', 90' (pen.); Laigle 73'; Klinsmann 76'	Report	Bellucci 15'; Protti 70'; Rossitto 78'	Stadium: Stadio Luigi Ferraris; Referee: Gennaro Borriello

4 January 1998 14	Fiorentina	1–1	Sampdoria	Florence
	Batistuta 7'	Report	Montella 78'	Stadium: Stadio Artemio Franchi; Referee: Domenico Messina

11 January 1998 15	Sampdoria	5–2	Parma	Genoa
	Montella 5'; Signori 26', 83'; Vergassola 33'; Thuram 49' (o.g.)	Report	Maniero 54', 58'	Stadium: Stadio Luigi Ferraris; Referee: Pasquale Rodomonti

18 January 1998 16	Lecce	1–3	Sampdoria	Lecce
	Rossi 90+3'	Report	Montella 12', 51'; Signori 77'	Stadium: Stadio Via del Mare; Referee: Roberto Bettin

25 January 1998 17	Sampdoria	1–1	Roma	Genoa
	Mihajlović 33'	Report	Mannini 26' (o.g.)	Stadium: Stadio Luigi Ferraris; Referee: Alfredo Trentalange

1 February 1998 18	Vicenza	1–1	Sampdoria	Vicenza
	Zauli 27'	Report	Veron 18'	Stadium: Stadio Romeo Menti; Referee: Robert Boggi

8 February 1998 19	Sampdoria	2–1	Brescia	Genoa
	Bia 18' (o.g.); Montella 36' (pen.)	Report	Neri 50'	Stadium: Stadio Luigi Ferraris; Referee: Emilio Pellegrino

11 February 1998 20	Sampdoria	2–0	Atalanta	Genoa
	Mihajlović 65'; Boghossian 79'	Report		Stadium: Stadio Luigi Ferraris; Referee: Piero Ceccarini

15 February 1998 21	Juventus	3–0	Sampdoria	Turin
	Del Piero 5'; Inzaghi 11'; Fonseca 78'	Report		Stadium: Stadio Delle Alpi; Referee: Pasquale Rodomonti

22 February 1998 22	Sampdoria	0–3	Udinese	Genoa
		Report	Jorgensen 36', 63' (pen.); Statuto 87'	Stadium: Stadio Luigi Ferraris; Referee: Daniele Tombolini

1 March 1998 23	Piacenza	1–0	Sampdoria	Piacenza
	Murgita 48'	Report		Stadium: Stadio Leonardo Garilli; Referee: Tarcisio Serena

8 March 1998 24	Milan	1–0	Sampdoria	Milan
	Ziege 37'	Report		Stadium: San Siro; Referee: Gennaro Borriello

14 March 1998 25	Sampdoria	0–4	Lazio	Genoa
		Report	Jugović 1'; Nedved 54'; Fuser 66'; Fuser 81'	Stadium: Stadio Luigi Ferraris; Referee: Domenico Messina

22 March 1998 26	Bari	0–1	Sampdoria	Bari
		Report	Montella 30'	Stadium: Stadio San Nicola; Referee: Roberto Bettin

29 March 1998 27	Sampdoria	2–3	Bologna	Genoa
	Montella 14'; Veron 49'	Report	Andersson 55', 69', 82'	Stadium: Stadio Luigi Ferraris; Referee: Massimo De Santis

5 April 1998 28	Internazionale	3–0	Sampdoria	Milan
	Hugo 50' (o.g.); Sartor 53'; Ronaldo 88'	Report		Stadium: San Siro; Referee: Robert Boggi

11 April 1998 29	Sampdoria	3–0	Empoli	Genoa
	Montella 41', 85'; Laigle 90+3'	Report		Stadium: Stadio Luigi Ferraris; Referee: Cosimo Bolognino

19 April 1998 30	Napoli	0–2	Sampdoria	Naples
		Report	Crasson 33' (o.g.); Laigle 87'	Stadium: Stadio San Paolo; Referee: Roberto Rosetti

26 April 1998 31	Sampdoria	2–0	Fiorentina	Genoa
	Montella 38', 77'	Report		Stadium: Stadio Luigi Ferraris; Referee: Roberto Bettin

3 May 1998 32	Parma	2–2	Sampdoria	Parma
	Chiesa 35'; Sensini 78'	Report	Paco Soares 66'; Boghossian 87'	Stadium: Stadio Ennio Tardini; Referee: Pierpaolo Rossi

10 May 1998 33	Sampdoria	1–1	Lecce	Genoa
	Scarchilli 60'	Report	Cozza 73'	Stadium: Stadio Luigi Ferraris; Attendance: 20,000; Referee: Danilo Nucini

16 May 1998 34	Roma	2–0	Sampdoria	Rome
	Totti 24'; Delvecchio 91'	Report		Stadium: Stadio Olimpico; Attendance: 57,119; Referee: Cosimo Bolognino

=== Coppa Italia ===
==== Round of 32 ====
3 September 1997 First leg	Torino	2–1	Sampdoria	Turin
20:30 CEST	Ferrante 7', 14'		Dorigo 52' (o.g.)	Stadium: Stadio Delle Alpi; Attendance: 15,000; Referee: Daniele Tombolini

24 September 1997 Second leg	Sampdoria	3–1 (4–3 agg.)	Torino	Genoa
20:30 CEST	Tovalieri 34', 36', 66'		Ferrante 17'	Stadium: Stadio Luigi Ferraris; Attendance: 12,000; Referee: Stefano Braschi

==== Round of 16 ====
16 October 1997 First leg	Milan	3–2	Sampdoria	Milan
20:45 CEST	Weah 64'; Maini 74'; Kluivert 90+2'		Tovalieri 20'; Boghossian 44'	Stadium: San Siro; Attendance: 6,589; Referee: Fiorenzo Treossi

19 November 1997 Second leg	Sampdoria	1–2 (3–5 agg.)	Milan	Genoa
20:30 CET	Mihajlović 29'		Leonardo 64'; André Cruz 82' (pen.)	Stadium: Stadio Luigi Ferraris; Attendance: 28,000; Referee: Stefano Braschi

=== UEFA Cup ===
==== First round ====
16 September 1997 First leg	Sampdoria (Italy)	1–2	(Spain) Athletic Bilbao	Genoa, Italy
20:30	Boghossian 74'	Report	Ríos 19'; Larrainzar 62'	Stadium: Stadio Luigi Ferraris; Attendance: 36,000; Referee: Ahmet Çakar (Turkey)

30 September 1997 Second leg	Athletic Bilbao (Spain)	2–0 (4–1 agg.)	(Italy) Sampdoria	Bilbao, Spain
20:30	Larrazábal 40' (pen.); Ziganda 47'	Report		Stadium: San Mamés Stadium; Attendance: 42,000; Referee: Marc Batta (France)

== Statistics ==
=== Players statistics ===
No.	Pos	Nat	Player	Total		Serie A	
No.	Pos	Nat	Player	Apps	Goals	Apps	Goals
1	GK	(Italy) ITA	Fabrizio Ferron	33	-49	33	-49
2	DF	(Italy) ITA	David Balleri	25	0	25	0
5	DF	(Italy) ITA	Moreno Mannini	25	0	25	0
6	DF	(Italy) ITA	Marcello Castellini	20	0	18+2	0
11	DF	(Federal Republic of Yugoslavia) YUG	Siniša Mihajlović	27	3	26+1	3
7	DF	(Italy) ITA	Emanuele Pesaresi	19	0	16+3	0
14	MF	(France) FRA	Alain Boghossian	31	6	31	6
20	MF	(Argentina) ARG	Juan Sebastián Verón	29	2	29	2
4	MF	(Italy) ITA	Marco Franceschetti	27	1	27	1
8	MF	(France) FRA	Pierre Laigle	30	5	30	5
9	FW	(Italy) ITA	Vincenzo Montella	33	20	33	20
12	GK	(Italy) ITA	Marco Ambrosio	3	-6	1+2	-6
3	DF	(Portugal) POR	Hugo	19	0	18+1	0
29	FW	(Italy) ITA	Giuseppe Signori	17	3	15+2	3
19	MF	(Italy) ITA	Simone Vergassola	26	1	13+13	1
10	MF	(Argentina) ARG	Ángel Morales	9	1	8+1	1
24	DF	(Senegal) SEN	Oumar Dieng	13	0	7+6	0
13	FW	(Italy) ITA	Sandro Tovalieri	9	3	6+3	3
18	FW	(Germany) GER	Jürgen Klinsmann	8	2	4+4	2
27	FW	(Brazil) BRA	Paco Soares	8	1	3+5	1
21	MF	(Italy) ITA	Alessio Scarchilli	21	1	2+19	1
15	MF	(Italy) ITA	Fausto Salsano	14	0	2+12	0
30	DF	(Italy) ITA	Stefano Nava	5	0	2+3	0
31	FW	(Cameroon) CMR	François Omam-Biyik	6	0	0+6	0
25	DF	(Italy) ITA	Nicola Zanini	3	0	0+3	0
17	MF	(Italy) ITA	Alessandro Lamonica	1	0	0+1	0
22	GK	(Italy) ITA	Giovanni Sannino	0	0	0	0
23	FW	(Italy) ITA	Daniele Dichio	0	0	0	0
28	MF	(Italy) ITA	Davide Vagnati	0	0	0	0
16	MF	(France) FRA	Christian Karembeu				

- Source: http://calcio-seriea.net/presenze/1997/1138/
