= 1996–97 UC Sampdoria season =

Sampdoria
1996–97 season
- President: Enrico Mantovani
- Manager: Sven-Göran Eriksson
- Stadium: Stadio Luigi Ferraris
- Serie A: 6th
- Coppa Italia: Round of 32
- Top goalscorer: League: Vincenzo Montella (22); All: Vincenzo Montella (24)
Home colours	Away colours	Third colours

During the 1996-97 season Sampdoria competed in Serie A and Coppa Italia.

== Summary ==
Unione Calcio Sampdoria had a decent season, in which it troubled the top three in the Serie A, and at half season even threatening to overhaul Juventus's league title, before losing its form during the spring. Vincenzo Montella, brought in from rivals Genoa to replace the departed Enrico Chiesa, sensationally equalled Chiesa's tally of 22 goals.

During December, Sven-Göran Eriksson agreed to be the new Blackburn Rovers head coach for the next season, however, in February the Swedish manager announced a move to Lazio, and in July 1997 brought both Roberto Mancini and Siniša Mihajlović with him. With playmaker Clarence Seedorf departing for Real Madrid, Sampdoria was once again in a predicament. It still possessed Juan Sebastián Verón's unique qualities, however. The Argentinian was a genuine sensation in his first European season, and stayed on for another year.

== Players ==
Note: Flags indicate national team as defined under FIFA eligibility rules; some limited exceptions apply. Players may hold more than one non-FIFA nationality.

No.	Pos.	Nation	Player
1	GK	ITA	Fabrizio Ferron
2	DF	ITA	David Balleri
3	DF	ITA	Emanuele Pesaresi
4	MF	ITA	Marco Franceschetti
5	DF	SEN	Oumar Dieng
6	DF	ITA	Stefano Sacchetti
7	DF	ITA	Alberigo Evani
8	MF	FRA	Pierre Laigle
9	FW	ITA	Vincenzo Montella
10	FW	ITA	Roberto Mancini
11	DF	YUG	Siniša Mihajlović

No.	Pos.	Nation	Player
12	GK	ITA	Matteo Sereni
13	DF	ITA	Moreno Mannini
14	MF	FRA	Christian Karembeu
15	MF	ITA	Fausto Salsano
16	MF	ITA	Vincenzo Iacopino
17	MF	ITA	Nicola Zanini
18	FW	ITA	Mattia Biso
19	MF	ITA	Simone Vergassola
20	MF	ARG	Juan Sebastián Verón
22	MF	ITA	Giovanni Invernizzi
23	FW	ITA	Marco Carparelli

=== Transfers ===
In
Pos.	Name	from	Type
MF	Juan Sebastián Verón	Boca Juniors	€5.70 million
FW	Vincenzo Montella	Genoa C.F.C.	€4.39 million
GK	Fabrizio Ferron	Atalanta B.C.	-
MF	Pierre Laigle	RC Lens	-
DF	Oumar Dieng	Paris Saint-Germain	-
GK	Alessandro Giovinazzo		-
MF	Mattia Biso	Derthona	-
MF	Simone Vergassola	Carrarese Calcio	-
MF	Nicola Zanini	Hellas Verona	loan ended
FW	Marco Carparelli	Chievo Verona	loan ended

Out
Pos.	Name	To	Type
FW	Enrico Chiesa	Parma F.C.	€13.80 million
MF	Clarence Seedorf	Real Madrid	€8.60 million
GK	Angelo Pagotto	A.C. Milan	
FW	Filippo Maniero	Hellas Verona	-
FW	Claudio Bellucci	S.S.C. Napoli	-

==== Winter ====
In
Pos.	Name	from	Type

Out
Pos.	Name	To	Type
MF	Nicola Zanini	Hellas Verona	-

== Competitions ==
=== Serie A ===
==== League table ====
Pos	Team	Pld	W	D	L	GF	GA	GD	Pts	Qualification or relegation
4	Lazio	34	15	10	9	54	37	+17	55	Qualification to UEFA Cup
5	Udinese	34	15	9	10	53	41	+12	54	Qualification to UEFA Cup
6	Sampdoria	34	14	11	9	60	46	+14	53	Qualification to UEFA Cup
7	Bologna	34	13	10	11	50	44	+6	49	
8	Vicenza	34	12	11	11	43	38	+5	47	Qualification to Cup Winners' Cup

Source: Serie A, RSSSF.com, Soccerway
Rules for classification: 1) Points; 2) Head-to-head points; 3) Head-to-head goal difference; 4) Goal difference; 5) Goals scored; 6) Draw. (Note: Head-to-head record is used only after all the matches between the teams in question have been played).

==== Results summary ====
Overall								Home						Away					
Pld	W	D	L	GF	GA	GD	Pts	W	D	L	GF	GA	GD	W	D	L	GF	GA	GD
34	14	11	9	60	46	+14	53	9	3	5	31	15	+16	5	8	4	29	31	−2

Source: Worldfootball

==== Results by round ====
Round	1	2	3	4	5	6	7	8	9	10	11	12	13	14	15	16	17	18	19	20	21	22	23	24	25	26	27	28	29	30	31	32	33	34
Ground	A	H	A	H	A	H	A	H	H	A	A	H	A	H	A	H	A	H	A	H	A	H	A	H	A	A	H	H	A	H	A	H	A	H
Result	L	W	W	L	L	W	D	W	D	D	D	L	W	W	W	W	D	W	W	L	D	L	L	W	D	L	W	D	D	L	D	W	W	D
Position	12	9	6	10	10	8	10	4	6	6	6	9	8	4	3	2	2	2	2	2	2	4	4	3	4	5	4	4	4	6	7	5	5	6

Source: Competitive matches
A = Away; H = Home; W = Win; D = Draw; L = Loss; = 1997–98 UEFA Champions League; = 1997–98 UEFA Champions League Second Qualifying round; = 1997–98 UEFA Cup; = 1997–98 Serie B

==== Matches ====
8 September 1996 1	Perugia	1–0	Sampdoria	Perugia
	Negri 23'	Report	Mihajlović (red card) 89'	Stadium: Stadio Renato Curi; Attendance: 25,000; Referee: Stefano Braschi

15 September 1996 2	Sampdoria	2–1	Milan	Genoa
	Rossi 45' (o.g.); R. Mancini 76'	Report	Weah 14'	Stadium: Stadio Luigi Ferraris; Attendance: 30,000; Referee: Fiorenzo Treossi

21 September 1996 3	Roma	1–4	Sampdoria	Rome
	Balbo 54'	Report	Aldair 64' (o.g.); Montella 73', 90'; R. Mancini 88'	Stadium: Stadio Olimpico; Attendance: 59,000; Referee: Domenico Messina

29 September 1996 4	Sampdoria	0–1	Napoli	Genoa
		Report	Beto 73'	Stadium: Stadio Luigi Ferraris; Attendance: 24,000; Referee: Roberto Bettin

13 October 1996 5	Bologna	2–1	Sampdoria	Bologna
	Fontolan 46'; Shalimov 60'	Report	Carparelli 79'; Karembeu (red card) 84'	Stadium: Stadio Renato Dall'Ara; Referee: Piero Ceccarini

20 October 1996 6	Sampdoria	2–0	Atalanta	Genoa
	Iacopino 11'; Verón 28'	Report		Stadium: Stadio Luigi Ferraris; Referee: Gianni Beschin

27 October 1996 7	Reggiana	1–1	Sampdoria	Reggio Emilia
	Tovalieri 32' (pen.)	Report	R. Mancini 13'; Balleri (red card) 44'	Stadium: Stadio Giglio; Referee: Daniele Tombolini

3 November 1996 8	Sampdoria	3–0	Piacenza	Genoa
	R. Mancini 16', 79'; Carparelli 53'	Report		Stadium: Stadio Luigi Ferraris; Referee: Pasquale Rodomonti

17 November 1996 9	Sampdoria	1–1	Parma	Genoa
	Carparelli 32'	Report	Chiesa 82'	Stadium: Stadio Luigi Ferraris; Referee: Piero Ceccarini

24 November 1996 10	Lazio	1–1	Sampdoria	Rome
	Negro 82'	Report	R. Mancini 6'; Pesaresi (red card) 79'	Stadium: Stadio Olimpico; Referee: Robert Boggi

1 December 1996 11	Hellas Verona	1–1	Sampdoria	Verona
	Corini 68'	Report	Montella 51'	Stadium: Stadio Marc'Antonio Bentegodi; Referee: Cosimo Bolognino

8 December 1996 12	Sampdoria	0–1	Juventus	Genoa
	Balleri (red card) 85'	Report	Ferrara 33'	Stadium: Stadio Luigi Ferraris; Referee: Stefano Braschi

15 December 1996 13	Internazionale	3–4	Sampdoria	Milan
	Branca 11', 46'; Berti 42'	Report	Montella 7', 57'; Franceschetti 85'; R. Mancini 90'	Stadium: San Siro; Referee: Alfredo Trentalange

22 December 1996 14	Sampdoria	2–1	Vicenza	Genoa
	Montella 15', 25'	Report	Otero 82' (pen.)	Stadium: Stadio Luigi Ferraris; Referee: Domenico Messina

5 January 1997 15	Udinese	4–5	Sampdoria	Udine
	Amoroso 23', 62'; Cappioli 44'; Bia 90' (pen.)	Report	R. Mancini 5', 19', 33'; Montella 11', 74'	Stadium: Stadio Friuli; Referee: Gennaro Borriello

12 January 1997 16	Sampdoria	4–1	Cagliari	Genoa
	Karembeu 27', (red card) 68'; Carparelli 48'; Montella 66', 90'	Report	Tovalieri 42'; Berretta (red card) 60'; Romero (red card) 68'	Stadium: Stadio Luigi Ferraris; Attendance: 23,328; Referee: Robert Anthony Boggi

19 January 1997 17	Fiorentina	1–1	Sampdoria	Florence
	Batistuta 31' (pen.)	Report	Franceschetti 89'	Stadium: Stadio Artemio Franchi; Attendance: 38,365; Referee: Pierluigi Collina

26 January 1997 18	Sampdoria	5–2	Perugia	Genoa
	R. Mancini 6', 58'; Verón 44', 74'; Montella 85' (pen.)	Report	Matrecano 14'; Negri 27'; Dicara (red card) 34'	Stadium: Stadio Luigi Ferraris; Attendance: 25,000; Referee: Pierluigi Pairetto

2 February 1997 19	Milan	2–3	Sampdoria	Milan
	Weah 37', 57'	Report	R. Mancini 1'; Ferron (red card) 24'; Mihajlović 74'; Carparelli 79'	Stadium: San Siro; Attendance: 54,767; Referee: Livio Bazzoli

16 February 1997 20	Sampdoria	1–2	Roma	Genoa
	Montella 74'	Report	Moriero 45'; Balbo 58'	Stadium: Stadio Luigi Ferraris; Attendance: 27,803; Referee: Robert Anthony Boggi

23 February 1997 21	Napoli	1–1	Sampdoria	Naples
	Boghossian 57'	Report	Mihajlović 88'	Stadium: Stadio San Paolo; Attendance: 40,834; Referee: Fiorenzo Treossi

2 March 1997 22	Sampdoria	1–2	Bologna	Genoa
	Montella 23'	Report	Kolyvanov 50', 90+2'	Stadium: Stadio Luigi Ferraris; Attendance: 26,186; Referee: Emilio Pellegrino

9 March 1997 23	Atalanta	4–0	Sampdoria	Bergamo
	Inzaghi 20', 29' (pen.), 90+3'; Morfeo 67' (pen.)	Report	Mihajlović (red card) 28'	Stadium: Stadio Atleti Azzurri d'Italia; Attendance: 21,500; Referee: Salvatore Racalbuto

16 March 1997 24	Sampdoria	3–0	Reggiana	Genoa
	Montella 5', 68' (pen.); Carparelli 8'	Report		Stadium: Stadio Luigi Ferraris; Attendance: 21,900; Referee: Gianni Beschin

23 March 1997 25	Piacenza	2–2	Sampdoria	Piacenza
	Tramezzani 14'; Piovani 30'	Report	Montella 39'; Pesaresi 48'	Stadium: Stadio Galleana; Attendance: 10,597; Referee: Pasquale Rodomonti

6 April 1997 26	Parma	3–0	Sampdoria	Parma
	Crespo 34', 84'; Sensini 68'	Report		Stadium: Stadio Ennio Tardini; Referee: Piero Ceccarini

13 April 1997 27	Sampdoria	1–0	Lazio	Genoa
	Montella 67' (pen.); R. Mancini (penalty missed) 90'	Report		Stadium: Stadio Luigi Ferraris; Attendance: 24,383; Referee: Fiorenzo Treossi

20 April 1997 28	Sampdoria	0–0	Hellas Verona	Genoa
		Report		Stadium: Stadio Luigi Ferraris; Referee: Livio Bazzoli

4 May 1997 29	Juventus	0–0	Sampdoria	Turin
		Report		Stadium: Stadio delle Alpi; Referee: Domenico Messina

11 May 1997 30	Sampdoria	1–2	Internazionale	Genoa
	Verón 14'	Report	Ganz 45', 76'	Stadium: Stadio Luigi Ferraris; Referee: Pierluigi Pairetto

15 May 1997 31	Vicenza	1–1	Sampdoria	Vicenza
	Ambrosetti 2'	Report	R. Mancini 1'	Stadium: Stadio Romeo Menti; Referee: Gennaro Borriello

18 May 1997 32	Sampdoria	4–0	Udinese	Genoa
	Verón 40'; Laigle 63'; Montella 65', 90' (pen.)	Report	Pierini (red card) 43'	Stadium: Stadio Luigi Ferraris; Referee: Stefano Braschi

25 May 1997 33	Cagliari	3–4	Sampdoria	Cagliari
	O'Neill 13'; Cozza 66'; Pancaro 79' (pen.); Villa (red card) 90'	Report	R. Mancini 11'; Minotti 45' (o.g.); Montella 73'; Villa 89' (o.g.); Iacopino (red card) 90'	Stadium: Stadio Sant'Elia; Referee: Pierluigi Pairetto

1 June 1997 34	Sampdoria	1–1	Fiorentina	Genoa
	Montella 37'	Report	Robbiati 23'	Stadium: Stadio Luigi Ferraris; Referee: Lorenzo Branzoni

=== Coppa Italia ===
==== Second round ====
28 August 1996	Genoa	2–2	Sampdoria	Genoa
	Torrente (red card) 19'; Nappi 46', 56'; Nicola (red card) 63'		Montella 21', 45'; Mannini (red card) 40'	Stadium: Stadio Luigi Ferraris; Attendance: 25,000; Referee: Alfredo Trentalange

1 September 1996 Replay	Sampdoria	0–2	Genoa	Genoa
			Morello 50'; Rutzittu 90'	Stadium: Stadio Luigi Ferraris; Attendance: 32,957; Referee: Pierluigi Pairetto

== Statistics ==
=== Players statistics ===
No.	Pos	Nat	Player	Total		Serie A		Coppa	
No.	Pos	Nat	Player	Apps	Goals	Apps	Goals	Apps	Goals
1	GK	(Italy) ITA	Ferron	33	-43	31	-39	2	-4
2	DF	(Italy) ITA	Balleri	31	0	29	0	2	0
5	DF	(Italy) ITA	Mannini	23	0	22	0	1	0
11	DF	(Federal Republic of Yugoslavia) YUG	Mihajlovic	29	2	28	2	1	0
7	DF	(Italy) ITA	Pesaresi	27	1	27	1		
14	MF	(France) FRA	Karembeu	32	1	29+1	1	2	0
4	MF	(Italy) ITA	Franceschetti	28	2	26+1	2	1	0
20	MF	(Argentina) ARG	Veron	34	5	32	5	2	0
8	MF	(France) FRA	Laigle	30	1	28+1	1	1	0
9	FW	(Italy) ITA	Montella	30	24	26+2	22	2	2
10	FW	(Italy) ITA	Mancini	35	15	33	15	2	0
12	GK	(Italy) ITA	Sereni	6	-7	3+3	-7	0	0
25	FW	(Italy) ITA	Carparelli	28	6	15+13	6		
24	DF	(Senegal) SEN	Dieng	17	0	11+4	0	2	0
6	DF	(Italy) ITA	Sacchetti	18	0	10+7	0	1	0
16	MF	(Italy) ITA	Iacopino	25	1	8+15	1	2	0
3	DF	(Italy) ITA	Evani	12	0	6+4	0	2	0
13	MF	(Italy) ITA	Invernizzi	17	0	4+11	0	2	0
15	MF	(Italy) ITA	Salsano	25	0	3+21	0	1	0
17	MF	(Italy) ITA	Zanini	5	0	2+1	0	2	0
19	MF	(Italy) ITA	Vergassola	3	0	1+2	0		
18	FW	(Italy) ITA	Biso	0	0	0	0		
22	GK	(Italy) ITA	Giovinazzo	0	0	0	0		
26	DF	(Italy) ITA	Lamonica	0	0	0	0		
	DF	(Italy) ITA	Milone	0	0	0	0		

- Source: http://calcio-seriea.net/presenze/1996/1117/
