= 1995–96 UC Sampdoria season =

Sampdoria
1995–96 season
- President: Enrico Mantovani
- Manager: Sven-Göran Eriksson
- Stadium: Luigi Ferraris
- Serie A: 8th
- Coppa Italia: Round of 16
- Top goalscorer: League: Enrico Chiesa (22); All: Enrico Chiesa (22)
Home colours	Away colours	Third colours

Unione Calcio Sampdoria was once again condemned to midfield mediocrity, despite the services of super striker Enrico Chiesa, who netted 22 goals in just 27 appearances. Sven-Göran Eriksson continued with an attacking style of play, leading to Sampdoria scoring 59 goals in 34 matches, only bettered by champions Milan and Lazio. The backside was the many conceded goals it led to, with even relegated Torino having a better defensive record than the Genua team. Playmaker duo Clarence Seedorf and Christian Karembeu had great seasons, both compensating for the losses of Jugović, Lombardo and David Platt in the summer. The duo caught the attention of Real Madrid, and moved to Spain, with Karembeu staying put until the end of the 1996–97 season.

== Players ==
Note: Flags indicate national team as defined under FIFA eligibility rules; some limited exceptions apply. Players may hold more than one non-FIFA nationality.

No.	Pos.	Nation	Player
1	GK	ITA	Walter Zenga
2	DF	ITA	David Balleri
3	DF	ITA	Riccardo Ferri
4	MF	ITA	Marco Franceschetti
5	DF	ITA	Moreno Mannini
6	DF	ITA	Alessandro Lamonica
7	DF	ITA	Emanuele Pesaresi
9	DF	ITA	Stefano Sacchetti
10	FW	ITA	Roberto Mancini
11	MF	ITA	Alberico Evani
12	GK	ITA	Angelo Pagotto
13	MF	ITA	Giovanni Invernizzi
14	MF	FRA	Christian Karembeu

No.	Pos.	Nation	Player
15	MF	ITA	Fausto Salsano
16	DF	YUG	Siniša Mihajlović
17	MF	NED	Clarence Seedorf
18	FW	ITA	Claudio Bellucci
19	FW	ITA	Mauro Bertarelli
20	FW	ITA	Enrico Chiesa
21	FW	ITA	Filippo Maniero
22	GK	ITA	Matteo Sereni
23	GK	ITA	Fabrizio Marchesotti
24	MF	ITA	Vincenzo Iacopino
25	DF	ITA	Alessandro Zito
26	MF	ITA	Davide Di Terlizzi
27	GK	ITA	Christian Cabella
28	MF	ITA	Giovanni Abate

=== Transfers ===
In
Pos.	Name	from	Type
MF	Clarence Seedorf	Ajax Amsterdam	-
MF	Christian Karembeu	FC Nantes	-
FW	Enrico Chiesa	U.S. Cremonese	€0.200 million
FW	Filippo Maniero	Padova	-
DF	David Balleri	Padova	-
DF	Emanuele Pesaresi	A.C. Ancona	-
FW	Claudio Bellucci	Fiorenzuola	-
DF	Marco Franceschetti	Calcio Padova	-
GK	Angelo Pagotto	AC Pistoiese	-
FW	Alessandro Melli	AC Milan	loan ended

Out
Pos.	Name	To	Type
FW	Ruud Gullit	Chelsea F.C.	-
MF	David Platt	Arsenal F.C.	-
MF	Vladimir Jugovic	Juventus	
MF	Attilio Lombardo	Juventus	-
DF	Pietro Vierchowod	Juventus	-
DF	Michele Serena	Fiorentina	-
FW	Alessandro Melli	Parma FC	-
DF	Marco Rossi	Club América	-
GK	Giulio Nuciari		retired

== Competitions ==
=== Serie A ===
==== League table ====
Pos	Team	Pld	W	D	L	GF	GA	GD	Pts	Qualification or relegation
6	Parma	34	16	10	8	44	31	+13	58	Qualification to UEFA Cup
7	Internazionale	34	15	9	10	51	30	+21	54	Qualification to UEFA Cup
8	Sampdoria	34	14	10	10	59	47	+12	52	
9	Vicenza	34	13	10	11	36	37	−1	49	
10	Cagliari	34	11	8	15	34	47	−13	41 (Note: CAG 7pts. UDI 6pts. NAP 4pts.)	

Source: 1995–96 Serie A, RSSSF.com, Soccerway
Rules for classification: 1) Points; 2) Head-to-head points; 3) Head-to-head goal difference; 4) Goal difference; 5) Goals scored; 6) Draw. (Note: Head-to-head record is used only after all the matches between the teams in question have been played).

==== Results summary ====
Overall								Home						Away					
Pld	W	D	L	GF	GA	GD	Pts	W	D	L	GF	GA	GD	W	D	L	GF	GA	GD
34	14	10	10	59	47	+12	52	10	5	2	33	15	+18	4	5	8	26	32	−6

Source: Worldfootball

==== Results by round ====
Round	1	2	3	4	5	6	7	8	9	10	11	12	13	14	15	16	17	18	19	20	21	22	23	24	25	26	27	28	29	30	31	32	33	34
Ground	H	A	H	A	H	A	H	A	H	A	H	A	H	A	H	A	H	A	H	A	H	A	H	A	H	H	A	H	A	A	H	A	H	A
Result	D	D	W	D	L	L	W	D	D	L	W	W	W	L	D	L	D	L	W	L	W	L	W	D	W	L	W	W	W	W	D	L	W	D
Position	7	12	7	7	11	13	9	9	11	12	12	9	6	8	8	11	11	12	10	11	10	11	9	8	8	9	8	8	8	8	8	8	8	8

Source: Competitive matches
A = Away; H = Home; W = Win; D = Draw; L = Loss; = 1996–97 UEFA Champions League; = 1996–97 UEFA Cup

==== Matches ====
27 August 1995 1	Sampdoria	1–1	Roma	Genoa
	Karembeu 22'	Report	Branca 24'	Stadium: Stadio Luigi Ferraris; Referee: Pierluigi Pairetto

10 September 1995 2	Cremonese	0–0	Sampdoria	Cremona
		Report		Stadium: Stadio Giovanni Zini; Referee: Pierluigi Collina

17 September 1995 3	Sampdoria	3–0	Parma	Genoa
	Karembeu 22', 75'; Bellucci 88'	Report		Stadium: Stadio Luigi Ferraris; Referee: Piero Ceccarini

24 September 1995 4	Torino	1–1	Sampdoria	Turin
	Rizzitelli 63'	Report	Maniero 57'	Stadium: Stadio delle Alpi; Referee: Domenico Messina

1 October 1995 5	Sampdoria	1–2	Cagliari	Genoa
	Maniero 31'	Report	Silva 53'; Oliveira 68'	Stadium: Stadio Luigi Ferraris; Referee: Pasquale Rodomonti

15 October 1995 6	Piacenza	3–2	Sampdoria	Piacenza
	Corini 13', (penalty missed) 85'; Piovani 18'; Caccia 20'	Report	Maniero 47'; R. Mancini 90'	Stadium: Stadio Galleana; Referee: Alfredo Trentalange

22 October 1995 7	Sampdoria	2–1	Fiorentina	Genoa
	Maniero 21'; Salsano 71'	Report	Rui Costa 57' (pen.)	Stadium: Stadio Luigi Ferraris; Referee: Cosimo Bolognino

29 October 1995 8	Padova	1–1	Sampdoria	Padova
	Ciocci 42'	Report	R. Mancini 44'; Karembeu (red card) 58'	Stadium: Stadio Euganeo; Referee: Salvatore Racalbuto

5 November 1995 9	Sampdoria	0–0	Internazionale	Genoa
	R. Mancini (red card) 33'	Report		Stadium: Stadio Luigi Ferraris; Referee: Marcello Nicchi

19 November 1995 10	Atalanta	3–2	Sampdoria	Bergamo
	Herrera 38'; Evani 78' (o.g.); Tovalieri 90'	Report	Maniero 24'; Seedorf 65'; Pesaresi (red card) 87'	Stadium: Stadio Atleti Azzurri d'Italia; Referee: Fiorenzo Treossi

26 November 1995 11	Sampdoria	1–0	Udinese	Genoa
	Mihajlović 89'	Report		Stadium: Stadio Luigi Ferraris; Referee: Domenico Messina

3 December 1995 12	Bari	1–3	Sampdoria	Bari
	Protti 48' (pen.)	Report	Chiesa 28', 37', 77'	Stadium: Stadio San Nicola; Referee: Roberto Bettin

10 December 1995 13	Sampdoria	2–0	Juventus	Genoa
	Chiesa 41', 53'	Report		Stadium: Stadio Luigi Ferraris; Referee: Robert Boggi

17 December 1995 14	Lazio	6–3	Sampdoria	Rome
	Signori 18', 40' (pen.); Mihajlović 45' (o.g.); Winter 57'; Casiraghi 67'; Fuser 70'	Report	Mihajlović 38'; Chiesa 65', 76' (pen.)	Stadium: Stadio Olimpico; Referee: Livio Bazzoli

23 December 1995 15	Sampdoria	2–2	Napoli	Genoa
	André Cruz 45' (o.g.); Chiesa 48'	Report	Di Napoli 54'; Buso 75'	Stadium: Stadio Luigi Ferraris; Referee: Gianni Beschin

7 January 1996 16	Milan	3–0	Sampdoria	Milan
	Panucci 10'; Savićević 37'; R. Baggio 56'	Report		Stadium: San Siro; Referee: Pasquale Rodomonti

14 January 1996 17	Sampdoria	2–2	Vicenza	Genoa
	Chiesa 19'; Karembeu 37'	Report	Rossi 39'; Ambrosetti 74'	Stadium: Stadio Luigi Ferraris; Referee: Emilio Pellegrino

21 January 1996 18	Roma	3–1	Sampdoria	Rome
	Balbo 45' (pen.), 62', 90'; Aldair (red card) 90'	Report	Mannini 52', (red card) 71'	Stadium: Stadio Olimpico; Referee: Stefano Braschi

28 January 1996 19	Sampdoria	2–0	Cremonese	Genoa
	Balleri 12'; Chiesa 60'	Report		Stadium: Stadio Luigi Ferraris; Referee: Roberto Bettin

4 February 1996 20	Parma	1–0	Sampdoria	Parma
	Lamonica 19' (o.g.)	Report		Stadium: Stadio Ennio Tardini; Referee: Gianni Beschin

11 February 1996 21	Sampdoria	1–0	Torino	Genoa
	R. Mancini 62'	Report		Stadium: Stadio Luigi Ferraris; Referee: Pierluigi Collina

18 February 1996 22	Cagliari	3–0	Sampdoria	Cagliari
	Napoli 38'; Oliveira 70'; Bisoli 86'	Report		Stadium: Stadio Sant'Elia; Referee: Loris Stafoggia

25 February 1996 23	Sampdoria	3–0	Piacenza	Genoa
	Mihajlović 27'; Chiesa 49'; R. Mancini 65'	Report		Stadium: Stadio Luigi Ferraris; Referee: Cosimo Bolognino

3 March 1996 24	Fiorentina	2–2	Sampdoria	Florence
	Rui Costa 48'; Robbiati 76'	Report	R. Mancini 22'; Karembeu 45'	Stadium: Stadio Artemio Franchi; Referee: Fiorenzo Treossi

10 March 1996 25	Sampdoria	3–1	Padova	Genoa
	Chiesa 4', 25', 54'	Report	Vlaović 46'	Stadium: Stadio Luigi Ferraris; Referee: Livio Bazzoli

24 March 1996 27	Sampdoria	2–3	Atalanta	Genoa
	Balleri 44'; Chiesa 45'	Report	Balleri 54' (o.g.); Morfeo 57'; Fortunato 84'	Stadium: Stadio Luigi Ferraris; Referee: Stefano Braschi

31 March 1996 28	Udinese	2–4	Sampdoria	Udine
	Bierhoff 45'; Marino 75'	Report	R. Mancini 31', 55'; Chiesa 63'; Mihajlović 72'	Stadium: Stadio Friuli; Referee: Pierluigi Pairetto

6 April 1996 29	Sampdoria	2–0	Bari	Genoa
	Maniero 71'; R. Mancini 84'	Report		Stadium: Stadio Luigi Ferraris; Referee: Alfredo Trentalange

10 April 1996 26	Internazionale	0–2	Sampdoria	Milan
		Report	Chiesa 44', 68' (pen.); Mihajlović (red card) 78'	Stadium: San Siro; Referee: Robert Boggi
Note:

13 April 1996 30	Juventus	0–3	Sampdoria	Turin
		Report	Chiesa 1'; Balleri 57'; Seedorf 62'	Stadium: Stadio delle Alpi; Referee: Gennaro Borriello

20 April 1996 31	Sampdoria	3–3	Lazio	Genoa
	Balleri 25'; R. Mancini 53'; Chiesa 87' (pen.)	Report	Casiraghi 21'; Signori 37', 64'	Stadium: Stadio Luigi Ferraris; Referee: Loris Stafoggia

28 April 1996 32	Napoli	1–0	Sampdoria	Naples
	Di Napoli 86' (pen.)	Report		Stadium: Stadio San Paolo; Referee: Emilio Pellegrino

5 May 1996 33	Sampdoria	3–0	Milan	Genoa
	Chiesa 1', 35'; R. Mancini 38'	Report		Stadium: Stadio Luigi Ferraris; Referee: Livio Bazzoli

12 May 1996 34	Vicenza	2–2	Sampdoria	Vicenza
	Mannini 18' (o.g.); Murgita 32'	Report	Seedorf 20'; R. Mancini 83'	Stadium: Stadio Romeo Menti; Referee: Pasquale Rodomonti

=== Coppa Italia ===
==== Second round ====
30 August 1995	Perugia	0–1	Sampdoria	Perugia
			R. Mancini 35'	Stadium: Stadio Renato Curi; Referee: Fiorenzo Treossi

==== Eightfinals ====
25 October 1995	Cagliari	2–1	Sampdoria	Cagliari
	Oliveira 4'; Muzzi 26', (red card) 46'		Franceschetti (red card) 8'; Sacchetti (red card) 24'; Seedorf 69'	Stadium: Stadio Sant'Elia; Referee: Piero Ceccarini

== Statistics ==
=== Players statistics ===
No.	Pos	Nat	Player	Total		Serie A		Coppa	
No.	Pos	Nat	Player	Apps	Goals	Apps	Goals	Apps	Goals
12	GK	(Italy) ITA	Pagotto	26	-35	23+1	-33	2	-2
2	DF	(Italy) ITA	Balleri	34	4	32	4	2	0
5	DF	(Italy) ITA	Mannini	29	1	27	1	2	0
16	DF	(Federal Republic of Yugoslavia) YUG	Mihajlovic	32	4	29+1	4	2	0
11	DF	(Italy) ITA	Evani	30	0	24+5	0	1	0
14	MF	(France) FRA	Karembeu	34	5	32	5	2	0
15	MF	(Italy) ITA	Salsano	29	1	20+7	1	2	0
17	MF	(Netherlands) NED	Seedorf	34	4	28+4	3	2	1
13	MF	(Italy) ITA	Invernizzi	32	0	25+5	0	2	0
20	FW	(Italy) ITA	Chiesa	27	22	27	22		
10	FW	(Italy) ITA	Mancini	28	12	25+1	11	2	1
1	GK	(Italy) ITA	Zenga	7	-6	7	-6	0	0
9	DF	(Italy) ITA	Sacchetti	26	0	16+8	0	2	0
21	FW	(Italy) ITA	Maniero	27	6	12+13	6	2	0
3	DF	(Italy) ITA	Ferri	16	0	11+5	0		
4	MF	(Italy) ITA	Franceschetti	17	0	10+5	0	2	0
7	DF	(Italy) ITA	Pesaresi	11	0	10	0	1	0
18	FW	(Italy) ITA	Bellucci	17	1	7+9	1	1	0
6	DF	(Italy) ITA	Lamonica	10	0	4+6	0		
22	GK	(Italy) ITA	Sereni	4	-8	4	-8	0	0
28	MF	(Italy) ITA	Abate	1	0	1	0		
19	FW	(Italy) ITA	Bertarelli	8	0	0+8	0		
24	MF	(Italy) ITA	Iacopino	4	0	0+4	0		
26	MF	(Italy) ITA	Di Terlizzi	2	0	0+2	0		
25	DF	(Italy) ITA	Zito	0	0	0	0		

- Source: http://calcio-seriea.net/presenze/1995/1102/
