= Siniša Mihajlović =

Serbian footballer and manager (1969–2022)

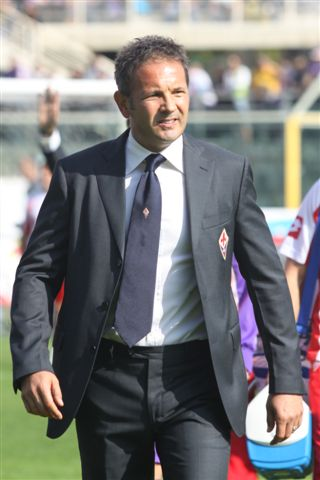
- Mihajlović as manager of Fiorentina in 2010

Personal information
- Date of birth: 20 February 1969
- Place of birth: Vukovar, SR Croatia, Yugoslavia
- Date of death: 16 December 2022 (aged 53)
- Place of death: Rome, Italy
- Height: 1.85 m (6 ft 1 in)
- Position: Defender

Youth career
- Borovo

Senior career*
Years	Team	Apps	(Gls)
1986–1988	Borovo	44	(12)
1988–1990	Vojvodina	73	(19)
1990–1992	Red Star Belgrade	38	(9)
1992–1994	Roma	54	(1)
1994–1998	Sampdoria	110	(12)
1998–2004	Lazio	126	(20)
2004–2006	Inter Milan	25	(5)
Total		470	(78)

International career
1991–2003	Serbia and Montenegro (Note: Including 4 caps for SFR Yugoslavia. Serbia and Montenegro was known as FR Yugoslavia until 2003.)	63	(10)

Managerial career
- 2008–2009: Bologna
- 2009–2010: Catania
- 2010–2011: Fiorentina
- 2012–2013: Serbia
- 2013–2015: Sampdoria
- 2015–2016: Milan
- 2016–2018: Torino
- 2018: Sporting CP
- 2019–2022: Bologna
Medal record
Representing Yugoslavia
Silver medal – second place	UEFA U-21 Euro	1990
- * Club domestic league appearances and goals

Siniša Mihajlović (Serbian Cyrillic: Синиша Михајловић, pronounced [sǐniʃa mixǎːjloʋitɕ]; 20 February 1969 – 16 December 2022) was a Serbian football manager and player. Though starting out as a midfielder, he spent the majority of his illustrious playing career in defence.

Mihajlović won the European Cup with Red Star Belgrade in 1991 before moving to Italy, making 353 appearances for Serie A sides Roma, Sampdoria, Lazio and Inter Milan and winning league titles with the latter two clubs. Considered by many to be among the best free kick takers of all time, (Note: In 2009, The Guardian placed Mihajlović at No. 5 of the 6 top free kick specialists, in September 2009, The Independent placed him at No. 8 of "The Ten Best Free-Kick Specialists", In January 2009, Soccerlens placed him at No. 2 of "Top Ten Free Kick Specialists of All Time", and Gianni Verschueren's December 2012 "Ranking the Greatest Free-Kick Takers of All Time" top ten list on Bleacher Report placed him at No. 5, followed by Alex Richards' December 2013 "Ranking the 16 Greatest Free-Kick Takers of All Time" list on the same site placed him at No. 2.) he holds the all-time record in Serie A for most goals from free kicks with 28 goals. He won 63 caps and scored 10 goals for Yugoslavia from 1991 to 2003, of which his first four caps in 1991 represented SFR Yugoslavia, and played in the 1998 FIFA World Cup and UEFA Euro 2000 tournaments.

Mihajlović retired from playing in 2006, becoming assistant manager at Inter. He managed six Serie A clubs from 2008 to 2022, starting and finishing with Bologna and also including Fiorentina, Torino and AC Milan. He was the coach of the Serbia national team from May 2012 to November 2013. He was diagnosed with leukemia in 2019 and died from the disease in 2022.

== Early life ==
Born in Vukovar into a working-class family of a Bosnian Serb father and a Croat mother, Mihajlović was raised in Borovo Naselje with a younger brother, Dražen (b. 1973). Their father Bogdan (d. 2011) was a truck driver at the Građevinar construction company in Vukovar, while their mother Viktorija worked in the Borovo shoe factory. Mihajlović identified as a Serb, but said that he viewed Croatia as his country as well.

During the Croatian War of Independence, his home was destroyed by Croatian forces, among whom was his childhood best friend, an ethnic Croat, forcing his parents to flee. His maternal uncle called his mother and said that she should stay in Borovo, and that Siniša's father was to be killed. His uncle was arrested when the Serbian Volunteer Guard took over Borovo, but was freed because he was related to Mihajlović. In a 2016 interview Mihajlović said he had forgiven his childhood friend in a meeting in Zagreb prior to the crucial Euro 2000 qualification match between FR Yugoslavia and Croatia.

== Club career ==
=== Early career ===
Mihajlović started playing organized football with his hometown team NK Borovo. He quickly marked himself out as a talented youngster, making the SR Croatia select squad for the Yugoslav inter-republic youth football tournaments.

In 1986, he was attached to NK Borovo's first team. Playing in the SR Croatia provincial league (third tier competition on the Yugoslav club football pyramid), his first team debut took place on 25 May 1986 against Šparta in Beli Manastir. The match ended 1–1 with Mihajlović scoring a goal. The 17-year-old also got his first taste of professionalism with his first monthly salary being CHF500.

In late 1986, Red Star Belgrade representatives led by scout Kule Aćimović came to watch the seventeen-year-old in a friendly Borovo played against FK Rad, but decided not to sign him.

Then in late spring 1987, with NK Rijeka and Dinamo Vinkovci both seeking to sign Mihajlović, Dinamo Zagreb—led by club president Ivo Vrhovec and head coach Ćiro Blažević—also expressed an interest; their youth players Zvonimir Boban and Robert Prosinečki had been playing with Mihajlović on the SR Croatia select youth team at inter-republic and provincial youth tournaments and recommended him to the team. After seeing Mihajlović in a training session, Blažević took him with the rest of the first team to Sassari for an impromptu getaway between two league matches towards the end of the season, and gave him a substitute appearance in Dinamo shirt in a friendly against local club Torres Sassari.

In September 1987, Mihajlović was invited to join Dinamo's youth squad for a friendly tournament in Salem, West Germany where he performed well. However, no deal was agreed again as the club's head coach Ćiro Blažević felt that Dinamo already had players for the central midfield position that were "just as good if not better", such as incoming Haris Škoro as well as club mainstay Marko Mlinarić and returnee Stjepan Deverić. With Dinamo only prepared to offer a stipend-based agreement rather than a professional contract, Mihajlović decided to continue with NK Borovo.

The decision not to take Dinamo's offer cost Mihajlović a place in the Yugoslavia under-20; head coach Mirko Jozić had told him that he would not be called up for the upcoming FIFA World Youth Championship in Chile unless he signed with the Zagreb club.

=== Vojvodina ===
Mihajlović signed for FK Vojvodina in 1988, as part of a group of players acquired by the club, which included defensive midfielder Slaviša Jokanović, and defenders Budimir Vujačić and Miroslav Tanjga. The club won the Yugoslav league title, with Mihajlović scoring four goals in 31 appearances. The following 1989–90 season saw Vojvodina compete in the European Cup for only the second time in their history, but lost in the first round to Hungarian champions Honvéd.

=== Red Star Belgrade ===
Mihajlović joined Red Star Belgrade on 10 December 1990 in a high-profile transfer with a transfer fee of DM1 million paid out to Vojvodina. Arriving at a club coached by his old Vojvodina mentor Ljupko Petrović, Mihajlović was brought in to establish a robust presence on the left side of midfield as well as to score set-piece goals. In the European Cup semi-final return leg versus Bayern Munich, Mihajlović scored both Red Star goals—a free-kick opener and the injury time winner with a shot that deflected off Klaus Augenthaler. In the final, Red Star defeated Olympique de Marseille on penalties, after a 0–0 draw at full time, with Mihajlović being one of the shootout scorers.

Mihajlović was also in the team later that year when Red Star Belgrade won the Intercontinental Cup, defeating Colo-Colo 3–0. He was then included by Yugoslavia national football team to UEFA Euro 1992, but the nation was disqualified from the competition by United Nations sanctions due to the Yugoslav Wars.

=== Roma ===
In the summer of 1992, amid interest from Juventus, Mihajlović signed for Roma for a reported ITL8.5 billion (~US$5.9 million) transfer fee, at the request of head coach Vujadin Boškov, also a new arrival to Olimpico. The club were looking to improve on their previous season's 5th place league finish.

Mihajlović secured a regular first team spot in the left midfield, and the team finished 10th in the league. Mihajlović also played a significant part in Roma's UEFA Cup campaign where they reached the quarterfinals—losing to Borussia Dortmund in a tie that saw the Serb score a trademark free-kick for a 1–0 first leg lead, before being beaten 2–0 in the return. Due to a long-term injury to Roma's left back Amedeo Carboni midway through the season, coach Boškov moved Mihajlović to the left back position.

The 1993–94 season started with new head coach Carlo Mazzone in charge after Boškov was sacked. In addition to the four foreigners already at the club, the club brought in Argentine Abel Balbo thus increasing competition for three foreign spots. Mihajlović continued as a left back under the new manager. In the 1993–94 season, the club finished 7th, and out of Europe for the second season running.

Years later, talking about his playing days, Mihajlović referred to his stay in Roma as "the two worst seasons of my entire career".

=== Sampdoria ===
In 1994, Mihajlović joined Sampdoria, who were the third-placed club in previous season's Serie A standings and the Coppa Italia winners, coached by Sven-Göran Eriksson. Also arriving the same summer were Inter stalwarts Walter Zenga and Riccardo Ferri as part of the deal that took goalkeeper Gianluca Pagliuca the other way.

In his four seasons at Sampdoria, Mihajlović saw limited success in the Serie A. In the European competitions, however, he helped Sampdoria reach the 1994–95 UEFA Cup Winners' Cup semifinal, where they were defeated by Arsenal on penalties.

In June 1998, Mihajlović represented FR Yugoslavia at the 1998 FIFA World Cup, playing all Yugoslav matches in the tournament. He scored a goal against Iran, and conceded an own goal against Germany. This made Mihajlović one of ten players to score both a goal and an own goal in a World Cup; some of the other ones being Ernie Brandts, Ruud Krol, Gustavo Peña and Mario Mandžukić.

=== Lazio ===
In the summer of 1998, Mihajlović was brought to Lazio by head coach Sven-Göran Eriksson and club president Sergio Cragnotti for £8.5 million. He won his first trophy in Italy as Lazio beat Juventus in the Supercoppa Italiana during late August 1998. The club finished 7th in Serie A.

Strengthening the squad for a serious run at the Serie A title, in addition to Mihajlović, the summer 1998 transfer window also saw Cragnotti bring in Dejan Stanković from Red Star Belgrade, established goalscorer Marcelo Salas from River Plate, and finally striker Christian Vieri from Atlético Madrid.

With Lazio, Mihajlović reached the final of the 1999 UEFA Cup Winners' Cup, winning the last edition of that competition with a 2–1 victory against RCD Mallorca. Lazio also won the 1999 UEFA Super Cup. Mihajlović played 26 times and scored seven goals during the 1999–2000 Serie A season as Lazio won their second Scudetto. Mihajlović completed the double by helping Lazio win the 2000 Coppa Italia.

Mihajlović represented Yugoslavia internationally again, at the Euro 2000 tournament. In the first Yugoslav game of the tournament, he was sent off against Slovenia. He served a one-game suspension before playing the last two games of the tournament.

Mihajlović won his last trophy with Lazio in 2004, beating Juventus in the Coppa Italia final.

=== Inter Milan ===
In 2004, Mihajlović was released from Lazio and joined his friend and former teammate Roberto Mancini at Inter Milan on a free transfer, signing a one-year deal. On 16 June 2005 Mihajlović signed a one-year extension. On 9 April 2006, in a league away game versus Ascoli, he scored his 27th career free-kick goal in the Serie A championship. He retired after the 2005–06 season.

During his time with Inter, he made 43 appearances and scored 6 goals, all from direct free kicks.

== International career ==
Playing as a youth international, Mihajlović featured in 5 games at the 1990 UEFA European Under-21 Championship.

Between 1991 and 2003, Mihajlović was capped 63 times and scored 10 goals for the Yugoslavia/Serbia and Montenegro. He participated at the 1998 FIFA World Cup where he scored a free-kick against Iran as Yugoslavia reached the second round. He also participated at UEFA Euro 2000. He was sent off in Yugoslavia's opening game against Slovenia but returned after a one match ban with Yugoslavia reaching the quarterfinal. His final international was a June 2003 European Championship qualification match away against Finland.

== Style of play ==
Early into his playing career, Mihajlović marked himself out with an extraordinary long-distance striking, crossing, and passing ability. His precise curling yet hard-driven left-footed shot allowed him to score free-kick goals on a regular basis. A set-piece and penalty kick specialist, Mihajlović has said that he has scored free-kicks from as far as 35 yards, adding in a 2000 interview with BBC Sport: "I like to shoot with a swerve into both sides of the net. I often try scoring directly from the corners.". Regarded as one of the greatest free kick takers of all time, he was capable of both scoring and creating chances from dead ball opportunities, and holds the record for the most goals in Serie A from free-kicks, as well as the record for second most goals from free kicks in all competitions, with 43, behind Alessandro Del Piero. Along with Giuseppe Signori, he is one of only two players who have scored a hat-trick from free kicks in Serie A, a feat which he accomplished during his time with Lazio, in a 5–2 win over Sampdoria, on 13 December 1998, during the 1998–99 season.

During his club career in Yugoslavia with Vojvodina and Red Star Belgrade as well as during his early spell at Roma, he played on the left side of midfield as winger, or as an attacking midfielder or second striker on occasion, where he was known for his stamina, speed, foot-work, and ability to cover the flank with his runs, as well as his excellent ball-striking ability with his left foot, and his ability to dictate attacking plays in midfield. Upon moving to Italy, midway through his first season in Serie A, Mihajlović was moved to the position of left back by Roma head coach Vujadin Boškov. The following season, under Roma's new head coach Carlo Mazzone, he mostly continued at left back while occasionally being deployed as a defensive midfielder, although his performances in this position were somewhat inconsistent due to his limited tactical sense. In 1994, after transferring to Sampdoria under head coach Sven-Göran Eriksson, Mihajlović was moved to the centre of the team's defensive line, and remained in this position for the rest of his career. He later excelled in this newfound centre back role, where he functioned as a sweeper, due to his consistent defensive displays, physique, intelligence, leadership, and tenacity, as well as his good technique, touch on the ball, and long passing ability, which enabled him to play the ball out from the back; he drew praise from manager Carlo Mazzone, in particular, who described him as one of the best players in the world in his position.

== Managerial career ==
=== Assistant at Inter Milan ===
After retiring from playing at Inter Milan, Mihajlović began a coaching career at San Siro as assistant to head coach Roberto Mancini. Mihajlović and Mancini had played together for five seasons at Sampdoria and Lazio.

Mihajlović's free-kick expertise has been praised by Zlatan Ibrahimović, who after several successful free-kicks thanked the then assistant coach Mihajlović who had trained him for two years at Inter.

Mancini was fired in June 2008 by club president Massimo Moratti at the end of the 2007–08 season to make way for José Mourinho. Mihajlović left the club at the same time.

=== Bologna ===
On 3 November 2008, Mihajlović was appointed to replace Daniele Arrigoni at Serie A relegation-battling club Bologna. His Serie A bench debut came on 8 November 2008 at home versus Roma. The match ended in a 1–1 draw. His tenure began with five consecutive league draws before a 5–2 victory against relegation rivals Torino on 13 December 2008.

Mihajlović was sacked by Bologna on 14 April 2009 in the wake of a 1–4 home defeat against Siena, which dragged the team back into the relegation zone with seven matches remaining in the season. His tenure suffered from media rumours that he had numerous high-profile disagreements with senior players at the club which led to the poor form that eventually cost him the job. Under new head coach Giuseppe Papadopulo, Bologna avoided relegation to the Serie B on the last day of the season with a win over Catania.

=== Catania ===
On 8 December 2009, Mihajlović was appointed new head coach of Catania, taking over from Gianluca Atzori. He signed a contract until June 2011 with gli elefanti, hiring Dario Marcolin—his former teammate at Lazio and colleague on Mancini's coaching staff at Inter—to be his assistant. Arriving at the club last in Serie A, Mihajlović made his debut with a home loss against relegation rivals Livorno. However, the following week, his team beat heavily favoured Juventus away in Turin with a 1–2 scoreline.

A string of good results, together with a number of key January signings such as former Argentine international striker Maxi López, helped Mihajlović keep the team out of the relegation zone. On 13 March 2010, Catania won 3–1 against league leaders and Mihajlović's former team Inter Milan.

Led by Mihajlović, Catania finished the season in 13th spot, well out of the relegation zone.

He resigned at the end of the season on 24 May 2010 amid reports linking him to incumbent UEFA Champions League winners Inter as a replacement for outgoing boss José Mourinho, which did not come to anything in the end.

=== Fiorentina ===
On 3 June 2010, Mihajlović was announced as the new head coach of Fiorentina, replacing outgoing Cesare Prandelli who had left the Tuscan club to become the manager of the Italy national team.

Fiorentina had finished the 2009–10 Serie A campaign in eleventh place, but had made the Champions League round-of-16 stage where they were eliminated by Bayern Munich on away goals. Mihajlović signed a two-year contract on a salary of just under €1 million per year. Mihajlović stated that making Europe was a realistic goal for the season.

==== 2010–11 season ====
The team suffered poor form in the first part of the season, with injuries to some key players. They finished the first half of the season in twelfth spot. Mihajlović signed winger Valon Behrami from West Ham United, but the alternating home and away form improved only slightly as the head coach experimented with various tactical formations.

In February 2011, Fiorentina won on the road for the first time in the season with a win at Palermo. In March 2011, the team recorded two straight wins for the first time in the season, climbing up to eighth spot. The club finished the league season with 12 wins (only three of those away from home), 11 losses, and 15 draws, which secured ninth place – twelve points out of a European spot.

==== 2011–12 season ====
During the summer 2011 transfer season, Mihajlović was strongly linked with a return to Inter in head coaching capacity, with some Italian papers even reporting the specific date of his unveiling at the nerazzurri following supposed successful negotiations with Inter's sporting director Marco Branca. However, Mihajlović denied those claims, pledging to stay on in Florence.

The season began in August 2011, with a Coppa Italia win over AS Cittadella. However, poor league form including five matches without a win put Mihajlović's position under pressure. At a home match against Genoa in October 2011, Fiorentina's supporters shouted abuse from the terraces throughout the match with calls for Mihajlović's sacking and even racist banners and chants targeting the coach's ethnicity. The fans' verbal abuse of Mihajlović made headlines for the next couple of days and sections of Fiorentina support issued an apology to the coach by hanging a banner outside of the stadium. Mihajlović was sacked on 7 November 2011, one day after a 1–0 away loss to ChievoVerona. The team was in 13th place in the league with 12 points from 10 matches.

=== Serbia ===
In May 2012, the Football Association of Serbia signed Mihajlović to become the head coach of the Serbia national team until the end of the 2014 FIFA World Cup in Brazil. Serbia finished third in Group A of the qualifying phase in October 2013 after which he resigned.

=== Sampdoria ===
On 20 November 2013, Sampdoria named Mihajlović as the new head coach in place for Delio Rossi. He signed a one-year rolling contract with automatic extension in case of a successful escape from relegation in the ongoing season, with his assistant coach Nenad Sakić (a former Sampdoria player himself) following him too.

During his first season in charge, he guided Sampdoria to significant improvements in results and easily escaped relegation. He successively agreed to stay for one more season, after talks with new president Massimo Ferrero, who took over from the Garrone family in July 2014. In the first weeks of the 2014–15 season, he managed to obtain eight points and no defeats in the first four games of the season, overseeing quality performances from players such as Stefano Okaka. On 1 June 2015 he wrote an open letter to confirm his departure as the head coach of Sampdoria.

=== Milan ===
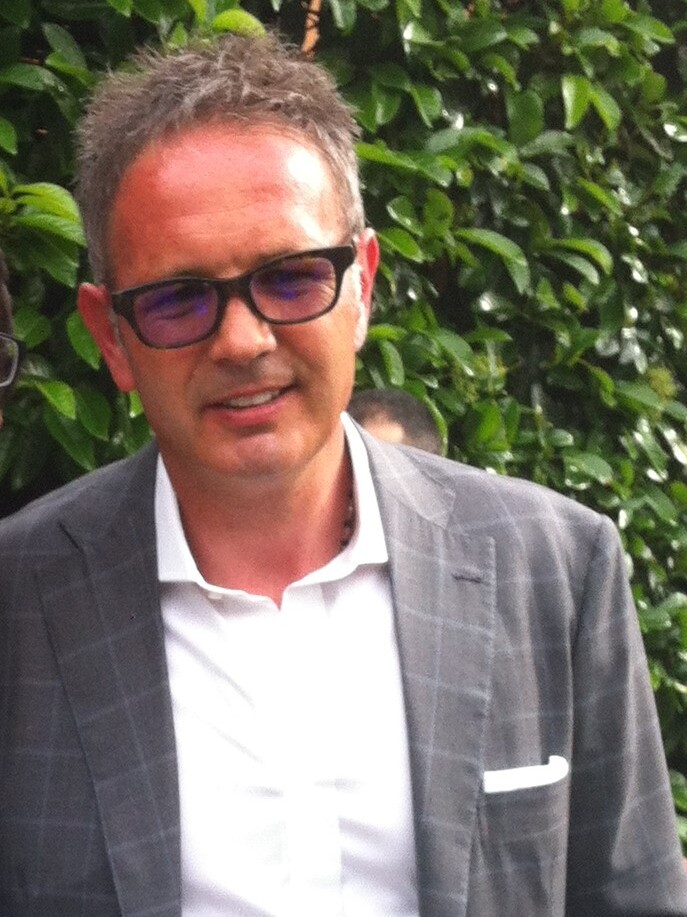
Mihajlović in 2015

On 16 June 2015, Milan officially sacked Filippo Inzaghi, appointing Mihajlović as their new manager, with a contract until 30 June 2017. During his tenure at the club, he was highly praised for trusting and giving playing opportunities to Gianluigi Donnarumma, who was only 16 years old at the time. Mihajlović was sacked on 12 April 2016.

=== Torino ===
On 25 May 2016, Mihajlović was officially appointed as the new manager of Torino, taking over from Gian Piero Ventura. He made his debut on the Granata bench on 13 August 2016 at the Stadio Olimpico Grande Torino with a 4–1 home win over Pro Vercelli in the third round of the Coppa Italia. Mihajlović fielded Torino with an aggressive 4-3-3 formation and by the midway point of the season registered a record for points (29) whilst under the presidency of Urbano Cairo, but a less brilliant second half of the season ended with Torino in ninth place. He was sacked on 4 January 2018 following a 2–0 defeat to Juventus in the Coppa Italia.

=== Sporting CP ===
On 18 June 2018, Mihajlović took over as manager of Sporting CP, signing a three-year contract with the Portuguese club. Nine days after his arrival, he was sacked due to change of executive staff.

=== Return to Bologna ===
On 28 January 2019, Bologna parted ways with Filippo Inzaghi due to a series of poor results, and Mihajlović took over at the club for the second time in his managerial career.

The team scored 30 points in his first 17 games, in comparison with 14 points achieved under Inzaghi; thanks to those results, Mihajlović managed to keep Bologna into the top flight with ease, and he was retained as manager for the following season.

On 13 July 2019, Mihajlović announced that he had been diagnosed with an acute form of leukemia, but that he planned to stay in charge of the club while undergoing treatment.

Mihajlović was sacked on 6 September 2022, after Bologna secured only three points from its first five matches in Serie A, ending his three-and-a-half-year spell with the club.

== Controversies ==
=== As a player ===
Mihajlović developed and fostered a reputation as a hard-nosed, tough-tackling player with a short fuse and no fear. As such he had many physical and verbal run-ins with opposing players that occasionally spilled outside of the pitch.

Already known as a player not backing away from physical play, the 22-year-old was one of the main protagonists of the ill-tempered 1991 Yugoslav Cup Final between Red Star and Hajduk Split on 8 May 1991 at the JNA Stadium in front of 7,000 spectators. Although of secondary importance to Red Star, which was getting ready for the European Cup Final three weeks later, the match still featured a degree of tension due to pitting a Serbian side against a Croatian one in an atmosphere of inter-ethnic incidents between Croats and Croatian Serbs in eastern Slavonia and Dalmatia regions of SR Croatia, including Mihajlović's hometown Borovo that saw a massacre only six days before the final. Early in the match Hajduk's 23-year-old defender Igor Štimac and Mihajlović began insulting each other, and according to Mihajlović during one of their exchanges Štimac told him: "I hope our guys kill all of your family in Borovo." In the 70th minute Mihajlović slid in for a hard tackle on another Hajduk player Grgica Kovač that led to play temporarily being stopped as both sets of players confronted each other. Mihajlović was led away by Hajduk player Ante Miše (the two knew each other as they were both from Borovo) who grabbed him by the hair while Red Star's Ilija Najdoski grabbed Hajduk's Slaven Bilić by the hair at which point Štimac jumped into the fracas with a raised fist attempting to punch Najdoski. Mihajlović received a second yellow for the challenge on Kovač, and the referee Adem Fazlagić also gave Štimac a second yellow, which meant both players got sent off.

Several years later, in October 2000, Mihajlović raised a storm of controversy due to allegedly directing racist remarks at Arsenal's Patrick Vieira. The incident occurred during an ill-tempered Lazio vs Arsenal UEFA Champions League match on 17 October 2000 at Stadio Olimpico. Throughout the contest, Mihajlović had run-ins with several Arsenal players, including Martin Keown and Robert Pires. After the final whistle, Mihajlović and Vieira were seen trading insults and trying to get at one another physically before being restrained by teammates. After the match, Vieira spoke to the media, accusing Mihajlović of racist abuse, saying that Mihajlović had called him "nero di merda" (black piece of shit) or "fucking black monkey." Mihajlović subsequently apologized, but contended that his words were in retaliation to Vieira calling him a "zingaro di merda" (Gypsy piece of shit). Two months later, in December 2000, Mihajlović came under police investigation over the event for possibly violating an anti-racism law in Italy. Italian investigators planned on using Mihajlović's own post-game admission about insulting Vieira to file charges of violating a 1993 law that criminalizes the "spreading ... of ideas based on racial or ethnic superiority or hate", but no charges were made. Six years later Mihajlović and Vieira became part of the same team when the Senegalese-born Frenchman joined Inter where Mihajlović was already assistant to head coach Roberto Mancini. Vieira was later one of the guests for Mihajlović's testimonial match on 28 May 2007 in Novi Sad.

On 7 November 2003, Mihajlović received an eight-match suspension by UEFA for spitting at and kicking Chelsea's Adrian Mutu during a Champions League group stage match. Six and a half years later, Mihajlović became the head coach of Fiorentina, where Mutu was playing at the time.

=== As a manager ===
A vocal and outspoken presence, known for his leadership, Mihajlović attracted much controversy throughout both his playing and coaching careers, for his political views and affiliations.

Amid Javier Clemente's failure to qualify the Serbia national team for Euro 2008, and Serbian press reports that then Inter Milan assistant coach Mihajlović was set to take over, Mihajlović publicly came out against the Serbia FA (FSS) president Zvezdan Terzić, accusing him in October 2007 of "giving national team call-ups to players [he had private contracts with] in order to boost their transfer value". Terzić did not directly respond to the accusation, which Mihajlović repeated several months later during early March 2008 in the wake of Terzić's time on the run from Serbian law enforcement over accusations of player transfer fee skimming.

In May 2012, Mihajlović landed the Serbia national team head coaching job (under the new FA president Tomislav Karadžić) and instituted a new code-of-conduct to be signed by players called up for international duty. One of the central points was his insistence that players sing the national anthem before matches. On 28 May, after Adem Ljajić failed to do so despite signing the code-of-conduct, Mihajlović removed him from the national team.

In December 2012, Mihajlović sued football agent Zoran Đurić for libel over his claims expressed during SOS channel's Total Soccer programme that "sports agents Fali Ramadani and Sergio Berti have a large influence on Mihajlović's national team squad selection".

In late March 2013, in the wake of the 2014 FIFA World Cup qualifier loss to Croatia, Mihajlović and Terzić reignited their public feud from six years prior, with the former Serbian FA president—who had in the meantime returned to the country from being on the run and completed a prison term following a plea deal—repeating Đurić's accusation about Mihajlović having "his national team match day squads selected by Sergio Berti". Mihajlović announced plans to sue Terzić for libel over the remark.

== Personal life and death ==
Mihajlović was married to Arianna Rapaccioni, an Italian former television presenter, with whom he had five children: three sons and two daughters. On 13 July 2019, Mihajlović announced that he had been diagnosed with an acute form of leukemia, but would stay on as manager of Bologna. He underwent a bone marrow transplant after three cycles of chemotherapy.

In October 2021, he became a grandfather, after his daughter Virginia gave birth to a daughter. The father is Alessandro Vogliacco, who, at the time, played for Genoa.

Mihajlović died on 16 December 2022 at a clinic in Rome, following complications of leukemia.

== Career statistics ==
=== Club ===
Appearances and goals by club, season and competition
Club	Season	League			National cup (Note: Includes Yugoslav Cup, Coppa Italia)		Continental		Other		Total	
Club	Season	Division	Apps	Goals	Apps	Goals	Apps	Goals	Apps	Goals	Apps	Goals
Vojvodina	1988–89	Yugoslav First League	31	4	5	0	—		—		36	4
Vojvodina	1989–90	Yugoslav First League	28	11	1	0	2 (Note: Appearances in European Cup)	1	0	0	31	12
Vojvodina	1990–91	Yugoslav First League	14	4			—		—		14	4
Vojvodina	Total		73	19	6	0	2	1	—		81	20
Red Star Belgrade	1990–91	Yugoslav First League	14	1	3	1	5	1	—		22	3
Red Star Belgrade	1991–92	Yugoslav First League	24	8	8	3	10	4	2 (Note: One appearance in UEFA Super Cup, one appearance in Intercontinental Cup)	0	44	15
Red Star Belgrade	Total		38	9	11	4	15	5	2	0	66	18
Roma	1992–93	Serie A	29	1	7	5	5 (Note: Appearances in UEFA Cup)	1	—		41	7
Roma	1993–94	Serie A	25	0	3	0	—		—		28	0
Roma	Total		54	1	10	5	5	1	—		69	7
Sampdoria	1994–95	Serie A	25	3	2	0	6 (Note: Appearances in UEFA Cup Winners' Cup)	1	1 (Note: Appearance in Supercoppa Italiana)	1	34	5
Sampdoria	1995–96	Serie A	30	4	2	0	—		—		32	4
Sampdoria	1996–97	Serie A	28	2	1	0	—		—		29	2
Sampdoria	1997–98	Serie A	27	3	4	1	2	0	—		33	4
Sampdoria	Total		110	12	9	1	8	1	1	1	128	15
Lazio	1998–99	Serie A	30	8	4	1	9	0	1	0	44	9
Lazio	1999–2000	Serie A	26	6	7	4	12 (Note: Appearances in UEFA Champions League)	3	1 (Note: Appearance in UEFA Super Cup)	0	46	13
Lazio	2000–01	Serie A	18	4	2	1	8	2	1	1	29	8
Lazio	2001–02	Serie A	6	0	2	0	2	0	—		10	0
Lazio	2002–03	Serie A	21	1	1	0	6	0	—		28	1
Lazio	2003–04	Serie A	25	1	6	0	5	1	—		36	2
Lazio	Total		126	20	22	6	42	6	3	1	193	33
Inter Milan	2004–05	Serie A	20	4	6	1	4	0	—		30	5
Inter Milan	2005–06	Serie A	5	1	5	0	3	0	—		13	1
Inter Milan	Total		25	5	11	1	7	0	—		43	6
Career total			426	66	69	17	79	14	6	2	580	99

=== International ===
Appearances and goals by national team and year
National team	Year	Apps	Goals
SFR Yugoslavia	1991	4	0
SFR Yugoslavia	1992	0	0
FR Yugoslavia	1993	0	0
FR Yugoslavia	1994	2	0
FR Yugoslavia	1995	3	2
FR Yugoslavia	1996	7	0
FR Yugoslavia	1997	10	2
FR Yugoslavia	1998	11	2
FR Yugoslavia	1999	5	0
FR Yugoslavia	2000	6	1
FR Yugoslavia	2001	6	2
FR Yugoslavia	2002	8	1
Serbia and Montenegro	2003	1	0
Total		63	10

Scores and results list Yugoslavia's goal tally first, score column indicates score after each Mihajlović goal.

List of international goals scored by Siniša Mihajlović
No.	Date	Venue	Cap	Opponent	Score	Result	Competition
1	12 November 1995	Estadio Nacional Flor Blanca, San Salvador, El Salvador	8	El Salvador	1–0	4–1	Friendly
2	15 November 1995	Estadio Tecnológico, Monterrey, Mexico	9	Mexico	3–1	4–1	Friendly
3	10 September 1997	Štadión Tehelné pole, Bratislava, Slovakia	23	Slovakia	1–1	1–1	1998 FIFA World Cup qualification
4	11 October 1997	Ta' Qali National Stadium, Attard, Malta	24	Malta	2–0	5–0	1998 FIFA World Cup qualification
5	3 June 1998	Stade Olympique de la Pontaise, Lausanne, Switzerland	30	Japan	1–0	1–0	Friendly
6	14 June 1998	Stade Geoffroy Guichard, Saint-Étienne, France	32	Iran	1–0	1–0	1998 FIFA World Cup
7	15 November 2000	Stadionul Steaua, Bucharest, Romania	48	Romania	1–1	1–2	Friendly
8	24 March 2001	Stadion Partizana, Belgrade, FR Yugoslavia	49	Switzerland	1–0	1–1	2002 FIFA World Cup qualification
9	15 August 2001	Stadion Crvene Zvezde, Belgrade, FR Yugoslavia	54	Faroe Islands	1–0	2–0	2002 FIFA World Cup qualification
10	16 August 2002	Stadion Crvene Zvezde, Belgrade, FR Yugoslavia	61	Finland	2–0	2–0	UEFA Euro 2004 qualifying

== Managerial statistics ==
Managerial record by team and tenure
Team	From	To	Record							
Team	From	To	G	W	D	L	GF	GA	GD	Win %
Bologna	3 November 2008	14 April 2009	22	4	8	10	25	36	−11	18.18
Catania	8 December 2009	24 May 2010	25	10	9	6	32	23	+9	40.00
Fiorentina	4 June 2010	7 November 2011	52	18	18	16	66	56	+10	34.62
Serbia	21 May 2012	19 November 2013	19	7	4	8	28	21	+7	36.84
Sampdoria	20 November 2013	1 June 2015	69	26	23	20	93	87	+6	37.68
Milan	16 June 2015	12 April 2016	38	19	10	9	57	37	+20	50.00
Torino	25 May 2016	4 January 2018	64	23	24	17	116	100	+16	35.94
Sporting CP	18 June 2018	27 June 2018	0	0	0	0	0	0	+0	—
Bologna	28 January 2019	6 September 2022	142	46	38	58	196	228	−32	32.39
Total			431	153	134	144	613	588	+25	35.50

== Honours ==
=== Player ===
Vojvodina

- Yugoslav First League: 1988–89

Red Star Belgrade

- Yugoslav First League: 1990–91, 1991–92
- European Cup: 1990–91
- Intercontinental Cup: 1991

Lazio

- Serie A: 1999–2000
- Coppa Italia: 1999–2000, 2003–04
- Supercoppa Italiana: 1998, 2000
- UEFA Cup Winners' Cup: 1998–99
- UEFA Super Cup: 1999

Inter Milan

- Serie A: 2005–06
- Coppa Italia: 2004–05, 2005–06
- Supercoppa Italiana: 2005

Yugoslavia U21

- UEFA European Under-21 Championship runner-up: 1990

Individual

- ESM Team of the Year: 1998–99, 1999–2000
- FR Yugoslavia player of the Year: 1999
- Italian Football Hall of Fame: 2022

=== Manager ===
Individual

- Serbian Coach of the Year: 2019
- Gazzetta Sport Legend Award: 2019
- Serie A Coach of the Month: April 2022

=== Orders ===
- Order of Karađorđe's Star
- Order of the Flag of Republika Srpska

== See also ==
- List of footballers who achieved hat-trick records
