= Vincenzo Montella =

Italian footballer and manager (born 1974)

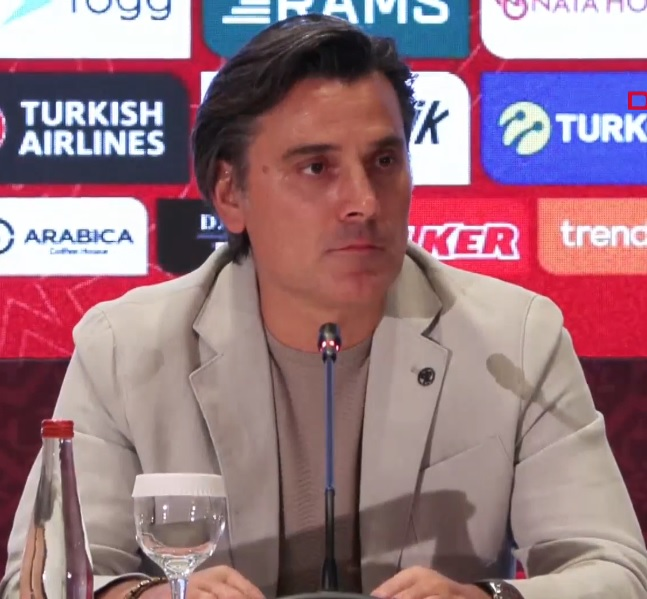
- Montella in 2025

Personal information
- Full name: Vincenzo Montella
- Date of birth: 18 June 1974 (age 52)
- Place of birth: Pomigliano d'Arco, Italy
- Height: 1.72 m (5 ft 8 in)
- Position: Striker

Youth career
- 1986–1990: Empoli

Senior career*
Years	Team	Apps	(Gls)
1990–1995	Empoli	51	(28)
1995–1996	Genoa	34	(21)
1996–1999	Sampdoria	83	(54)
1999–2009	Roma	192	(83)
2007	→ Fulham (loan)	10	(3)
2007–2008	→ Sampdoria (loan)	13	(4)
Total		383	(192)

International career
1999–2005	Italy	20	(3)

Managerial career
- 2011: Roma (interim)
- 2011–2012: Catania
- 2012–2015: Fiorentina
- 2015–2016: Sampdoria
- 2016–2017: AC Milan
- 2017–2018: Sevilla
- 2019: Fiorentina
- 2021–2023: Adana Demirspor
- 2023–2026: Turkey
Medal record
Representing Italy
Association football
UEFA European Championship
Silver medal – second place	2000
- * Club domestic league appearances and goals

Vincenzo Montella Cavaliere OMRI (Italian pronunciation: [vinˈtʃɛntso monˈtɛlla]; born 18 June 1974) is an Italian football manager and former player who played as a striker. He last served as the head coach of Turkey's national football team.

Montella's nickname during his playing career was "Aeroplanino", in reference to his small stature and trademark goal celebration, in which he spread his arms like wings. A prolific goalscorer, throughout his playing career Montella played for Italian clubs Empoli, Genoa, Sampdoria and Roma, and also had a spell on loan in England with Fulham. He is mostly remembered for his performances with Roma, where he won the Serie A title and the Supercoppa Italiana during the 2000–01 season, also later reaching the 2003 Coppa Italia final with the club. In 2013, Montella was inducted into the Roma Hall of Fame.

At international level, he made 20 appearances for Italy between 1999 and 2005, scoring three goals; he was notably a member of the Italian team that reached the final of UEFA Euro 2000, and he also represented his country at the 2002 FIFA World Cup.

Montella began his managerial career as Roma's caretaker manager in 2011, later coaching Catania the following season. In 2012, he moved to Fiorentina, where he spent three seasons, leading the club to three consecutive fourth-place league finishes, the 2014 Coppa Italia final and the 2014–15 UEFA Europa League semi-finals. After a season-long spell with Sampdoria, he was appointed Milan's manager in 2016, and later that year, he won his first title as a coach with the club, the Supercoppa Italiana. He was sacked by the club in 2017, and was subsequently appointed manager of Spanish side Sevilla. Despite reaching the Copa del Rey final and the UEFA Champions League quarter-finals for the first time in the club's history, he was sacked by Sevilla four months after his appointment, following a run that included nine matches without a victory. He returned to Fiorentina in 2019, with the second spell lasting over eight months.

After managing Adana Demirspor in the Turkish league from 2021 to 2023, he was appointed as coach of the Turkish national team in September 2023. Under his leadership, the team qualified for UEFA Euro 2024 and reached the quarter-finals, and also participated in the 2026 FIFA World Cup, marking their first appearance at the finals since 2002. Additionally, the team was able to get promoted to League A, the top tier of the UEFA Nations League. He was sacked in October 2026, after the team was eliminated in the group stage of the 2026 FIFA World Cup, followed by four consecutive defeats in League A of the 2026–27 UEFA Nations League.

== Club career ==
=== Early career ===
Montella began his club career in Serie C1 at Empoli in 1990 before moving to Serie B club Genoa in 1995, where he scored 21 goals in his only season with the club, at the end of which he lifted the Anglo-Italian Cup. He then moved up to Serie A to city rivals Sampdoria, where he remained three years, until 1999. After Sampdoria's relegation, he moved to Roma in a 50 billion lire (about €25.823 million) transfer.

Montella made his Serie A debut on 8 September 1996, against Perugia.

=== Roma ===
It was Roma coach Zdeněk Zeman that wanted him to spearhead the Roma attack, but that year Roma also signed a new coach, Fabio Capello, who disliked short forwards. Despite this, during the 1999–2000 season, Montella scored 18 goals, being the top scorer of the giallorossi, playing alongside Marco Delvecchio, in front of advanced playmaker Francesco Totti. The following year, Roma signed the Argentinian forward Gabriel Batistuta from Fiorentina, the tall striker wanted by Capello.

There was a slight controversy between the two forwards concerning the number 9 shirt, the prior number of both players – Batistuta ultimately chose number 18, although Batistuta was often the coach's first choice, while Montella was usually deployed as a substitute. Despite his lack of starts, he was one of the main protagonists of Roma's third Scudetto in 2000–01 and scored many important goals for the club, including the equalising goal in a 2–2 away draw in Serie A against eventual runners-up Juventus on 6 May 2001, and Roma's second goal in the 3–1 title-deciding victory over Parma on 17 June, at the Stadio Olimpico in Rome.

The controversies between Capello and Montella continued in the following years, as Montella was unhappy at his lack of first team opportunities, and in March 2002, Montella made his sadness clear, stating: "I would have better expectations with another coach." Despite his struggle to gain a starting spot, he became a club idol to the supporters, as he had a knack for performing well in the Rome derby against Lazio, scoring a brace in his first derby in 1999, and four goals in a 5–1 win on 10 March 2002; this four-goal haul is still the record of goals scored in a derby match by a single player.

2003 was a difficult year for Montella, as he divorced from his former wife, Rita, and was plagued with many injuries. During the 2003–04 season, he played only twelve games, but still managed a solid scoring record, scoring six goals despite his limited playing time.

During the 2004–05 season, Capello finally left Roma – for Juventus – and, while the giallorossi had a disastrous season, Montella scored 23 goals and earned a new contract lasting until 30 June 2010, also helping Roma to the Coppa Italia final that season. In the 2005–06 season, he was again plagued with injuries. He underwent surgery on both his back and shoulder, limiting him to just twelve games. In January 2007, during the 2006–07 season, he was loaned to Fulham because Francesco Totti was the lone forward in new head coach Luciano Spalletti's 4–2–3–1 formation, while Montella wanted to have more chances to play.

With Roma, Montella played a total of 215 matches over eight years, scoring 94 goals to become the fifth-best topscorer in Roma history. He played his last game for Roma, on 23 December 2006, before leaving on loan to England.

==== Loan to Fulham ====
Montella joined Fulham on a six-month loan on 4 January 2007, and was given the number 11 shirt. He scored twice against Leicester City on his home debut, in the FA Cup. He scored again on 27 January in the same competition against Stoke City.

On 13 January 2007, Montella made his Premier League debut, against West Ham United. Against Tottenham Hotspur at Craven Cottage seven days later, he scored his first Premier League goal with a penalty kick. He also scored a goal against Blackburn Rovers in a 1–1 draw, which gave Fulham the boost to avoid relegation.

Montella quickly became popular with the Fulham fans, and showed his gratitude for making him feel at home at Craven Cottage. However, he hardly started under manager Chris Coleman, despite several public pleas. After Coleman's sacking, Montella only started twice under his replacement Lawrie Sanchez. Montella hinted that he would like to return to Roma, after the end of the 2006–07 season. The loan was terminated by Sanchez on 8 May 2007, a week before its natural expiration.

==== Loan to Sampdoria and return ====
He was loaned to Sampdoria for the 2007–08 season. Bruno Conti brought Montella back to Roma in 2008–09, after Mancini had departed Roma to join Inter Milan. Montella took number 23 when he came back; Mirko Vučinić held on the number 9 shirt which was formerly Montella's, and Montella took the number 23 shirt, formerly of Vučinić.

Montella was only able to make substitute appearances for Roma in the 2008–09 season. He played his last game on 16 May 2009.

On 2 July 2009, Montella announced his retirement from professional football.

== International career ==
Montella received his first international cap for Italy under Dino Zoff in a UEFA Euro 2000 qualifying match against Wales on 5 June 1999, which Italy won 4–0, coming on as a second-half substitute for Christian Vieri; he was part of the final 22-man Italian squad that took part at Euro 2000, where they reached the final. Although Montella did not score during the competition, he recorded an assist in Italy's final group match against Sweden, setting up Alessandro Del Piero's match-winning goal in the 2–1 victory, which allowed Italy to top their group. He would also make one more appearance during the tournament, in the 2–1 final defeat against France, coming on as a late second-half substitute for Roma teammate and goalscorer Marco Delvecchio, with Italy leading 1–0; France equalised in injury time and eventually won the match in extra-time courtesy of a David Trezeguet golden goal. He scored his first goal for Italy in an international friendly match against South Africa in Perugia on 25 April 2001, a 1–0 home win for Italy. On 27 March 2002, he scored a notable double against England in an international friendly match in Leeds, giving Italy a 2–1 away victory after they had been trailing 1–0, with his second, match-winning goal coming from an injury-time penalty.

After appearing for Italy under Giovanni Trapattoni during their 2002 FIFA World Cup qualifying campaign, Montella was chosen as a member of the Italy team that would be competing at the 2002 World Cup, where the Italians were eliminated controversially in the round of 16 to co-hosts South Korea, following a 2–1 defeat in extra time. In his only World Cup appearance, during Italy's final group stage match against Mexico in the 2002 World Cup, he had a goal disallowed. He later set up Del Piero's equaliser in the eventual 1–1 draw, which helped Italy to progress to the second round. He had warmed up and was ready to come off the bench in the round of 16 match, but South Korea's Ahn scored the golden goal moments before he was set to come on. He later also appeared for Italy in three Euro 2004 qualifying matches, but was not called up for the final tournament. He made his final appearance for Italy under Marcello Lippi, in an international friendly match against Russia on 9 February 2005, held in Cagliari, which Italy won 2–0. In total, Montella won twenty caps and scored three goals for Italy.

== Style of play ==
Nicknamed "L'Aeroplanino" ("The Little Airplane"), due to his small stature and trademark goal celebration, in which he spread his arms like wings, Montella was known as a quick, hard-working, intelligent and opportunistic left-footed striker, who was gifted with pace, good technique and a keen eye for goal, and was capable of striking the ball well with either foot; he has also been described as a "fine all round player, with excellent passing and dribbling skills." Although he was primarily played as a centre-forward, a position in which he earned a reputation as a prolific "goal-poacher", his wide range of skills made him a versatile forward, who also capable of playing in a more creative role as a second striker. However, despite his ability and goalscoring record as a footballer, at times he was criticised by his Roma manager Fabio Capello for being a "selfish" player; he was also known to be injury-prone. During the 1999–2000 season, former Italy striker Paolo Rossi likened Montella's playing style to his own, commenting "He's the striker who most reminds me of myself."

== Coaching career ==
=== Roma ===
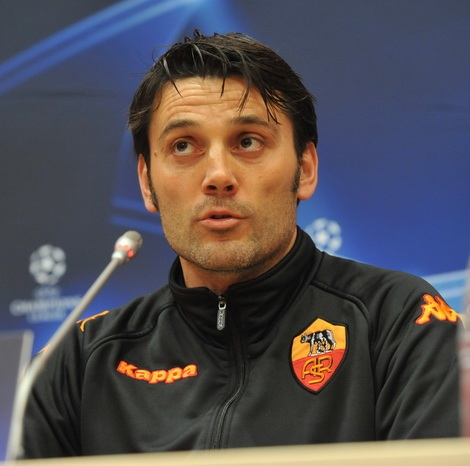
Montella as Roma coach, 2011

Montella signed a three-year contract with Roma as youth team coach for the Giovanissimi Nazionali (under-15 level).

On 21 February 2011, he was appointed as interim head coach of the first team for the remainder of the season, taking over the role from resigning boss Claudio Ranieri. On 23 February, in his first Serie A match in charge, Roma won away against Bologna, 1–0. On 8 March, in his Champions League managerial debut, Roma lost away to Shakhtar Donetsk, 3–0. Montella completed an eventful season for Roma, leading the Giallorossi to sixth place in the league table, and he was subsequently released, after the new club owners led by American businessman Thomas R. DiBenedetto decided to appoint Luis Enrique as permanent head coach for the 2011–12 season.

=== Catania ===
On 9 June 2011, and only a few days after being released by Roma, Montella was announced as new boss of Catania, signing a two-year contract with the Eastern Sicilian club. He led Catania to a mid-table placement, and ahead of Sicilian rivals Palermo for the first time in eight years; by the end of season, he was heavily linked with a comeback at Roma and the vacant job at Fiorentina. Montella left Catania by mutual consent on 4 June 2012, after only one season in charge.

=== Fiorentina ===
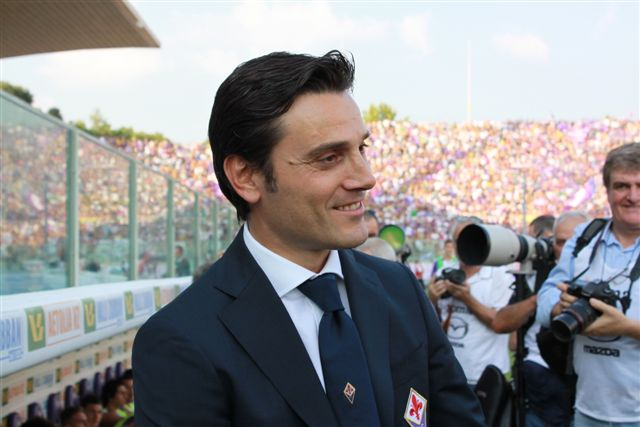
Montella as Fiorentina head coach, 2012

On 11 June 2012, Fiorentina announced on their official website that Montella signed a two-year deal (later extended until June 2017) with the club. Montella's arrival saw a massive upheaval of the squad, which saw 17 (including Borja Valero and Alberto Aquilani) out of the 26 senior players being new to the club. Fiorentina finished the 2012–13 Serie A in fourth place, missing out on a Champions League spot to Milan on the final day of the season.

In his second season in charge, Montella led Fiorentina to the 2014 Coppa Italia final, but were beaten 3–1 by Napoli, while the team finished the league season in fourth place once again. In his third season, Montella helped Fiorentina reach the semi-final of the 2014–15 UEFA Europa League, where they were eliminated by defending champions and eventual winners Sevilla. Fiorentina finished the league season in fourth place for the third consecutive season. On 8 June, he was sacked.

=== Sampdoria ===
On 15 November 2015, Sampdoria announced Montella as their new head coach. On 28 June 2016, Montella left the club to join Milan.

=== Milan ===
On 28 June 2016, Milan announced Montella as their new head coach, with a contract starting from 1 July. He signed a two-year deal, reportedly worth €2.3 million per year, while Sampdoria were paid €500,000 as a compensation to release him from his contract. On 23 December, Montella led the "Rossoneri" to their first title since 2011, the Supercoppa Italiana, defeating Juventus 4–3 in a penalty shootout, after a 1–1 draw following extra time. With a sixth-place finish in the league his first season, Montella led Milan to qualify for the third round of 2017–18 UEFA Europa League qualification phase, marking Milan's return to European competition for the first time since February 2014. On 30 May 2017, he signed a new contract until 2019.

Although much was expected of Milan after a €200m summer transfer campaign financed by the team's new owners, the first half of the 2017–18 season was disappointing for the club; Montella drew criticism in the media for struggling to find a suitable formation for his players and a fixed starting eleven, and only won six out of the first 14 games in the league. Following these poor results at the beginning of the 2017–18 Serie A season, Montella was eventually sacked by Milan on 27 November 2017, following a 0–0 home draw against Torino the day before; Gennaro Gattuso was announced as Montella's replacement.

=== Sevilla ===
On 28 December 2017, Spanish club Sevilla announced the appointment of Montella as the replacement of the recently sacked Eduardo Berizzo, signing a contract which would last until mid-2019.

During his tenure, Montella managed to guide Sevilla to a first-ever Champions League quarter-final, defeating Manchester United 2–1 on aggregate in the round of 16. Sevilla were beaten by Bayern Munich in the quarter-finals 2–1 on aggregate. Montella also led Sevilla to the 2018 Copa del Rey final, defeating teams such as Atlético Madrid and Léganes in the process, though they suffered a 5–0 defeat to Barcelona.

Despite being the finalists of the Copa Del Rey, Sevilla struggled with their league form, and on 28 April 2018, Montella was sacked, following a run of nine games without a victory.

=== Return to Fiorentina ===
On 10 April 2019, Montella returned to Fiorentina after the resignation of Stefano Pioli. Following a 1–4 away defeat to Roma in Serie A on 20 December 2019, he was dismissed from his managerial post the day after.

=== Adana Demirspor ===
On 1 September 2021, Montella signed a two-year contract with Adana Demirspor, starting off on a new experience for himself in Turkey. In his first season, Adana Demirspor finished ninth in the league.

In his second season, Adana Demirspor finished the league in fourth place with a record of 20 wins, nine draws and seven losses in 36 matches, which was their best league position in their history that qualified them to first participation ever in European competitions, namely the Conference League.

On 12 June 2023, Adana Demirspor announced that they had parted ways with Montella by mutual consent at the end of the season.

=== Turkey ===
On 21 September 2023, Montella was unveiled as the new manager of the Turkey national football team, a day after Stefan Kuntz was sacked following a 4−2 friendly loss against Japan.

On 12 October 2023, Montella managed his first official match in a 1–0 away victory to Croatia. On 15 October 2023, he qualified the national team for UEFA Euro 2024 after a 4–0 win over Latvia and finishing first in their group. In the opening match of the final tournament, Turkey defeated Georgia 3–1. Turkey lost their second match 3–0 to Portugal, but won their final group match against Czech Republic 2–1, advancing to the second round in second place in their group with six points. In the round of 16, Turkey defeated Austria 2–1 to advance to the quarter-finals of the tournament. Turkey were eliminated from the tournament in the quarter-finals following a 2–1 defeat to the Netherlands. In Montella’s coaching, Turkey managed to both advance from the group stage and reach the quarterfinals in an international tournament for the first time in 16 years.

Following this tournament, Montella remained in charge of the Turkish national team as they finished second in League B of the 2024–25 UEFA Nations League, competing alongside Iceland, Montenegro, and Wales. A 3–1 defeat to Montenegro in their final match saw them finish behind Wales in the group. In the March 2025 promotion play-offs against Hungary, Turkey secured a 6–1 aggregate victory (3–1 and 3–0), earning promotion to League A for the first time and their first win over Hungary in 18 years.

In the 2026 World Cup qualifiers, Turkey finished second in their group behind Spain and proceeded to the play-offs. They then defeated Romania 1–0 in the play-off semi-finals on 26 March 2026, advancing to face Kosovo in the final. Five days later, on 31 March, Turkey defeated Kosovo 1–0 in the play-off final, securing qualification for the 2026 FIFA World Cup—the first to feature 48 teams, expanding from the previous 32 team format— and marking their first appearance since 2002.

At the actual tournament, Turkey greatly underperformed in Group D and were the second nation in the World Cup to be eliminated after Haiti, by losing 2–0 to Australia in the opening match and then losing 1–0 to a 10-man Paraguay. Turkey had 62 shots in the first 2 games, scoring 0 goals. The team earned a late 3–2 victory in their final group match against co-hosts and group winners United States, but finished bottom of their group with three points. The immediate exit sparked massive outrage across social media, with fans demanding Montella's resignation over his tactical setups. Montella fiercely defended his squad in post-match press conferences, citing that the team topped multiple attacking metrics and condemned personal insults directed at him and his players. Despite the intense scrutiny, Turkish Football Federation (TFF) president İbrahim Ethem Hacıosmanoğlu firmly backed Montella, explicitly ruling out his dismissal and urging the head coach to shift his focus to the 2026–27 UEFA Nations League and Euro 2028 qualifiers. This decision stood in stark contrast to several other nations, where head coaches were either promptly dismissed or chose to mutually resign following their teams' poor tournament results.

In League A of the 2026–27 UEFA Nations League, competing alongside France, Italy and Belgium, Turkey began its campaign with two home defeats to France and Italy in Kocaeli and Bursa, losing 1–0 and 4–1 respectively. Two more defeats followed on foreign ground against Belgium and against Italy once again, as the scoreboard showed 3–0 in Liège and 3–1 in Bologna. These four consecutive defeats marked Turkey's worst run of competitive results in 38 years and left the team at risk of direct relegation to League B for the 2028–29 season. Following these results, the TFF announced on 9 October 2026 that it had parted ways with Montella, ending his three-year tenure as head coach of the national team.

== Media ==
Montella has featured in EA Sports' FIFA video game series; he was on the cover for the Italian edition of FIFA 2000.

== Career statistics ==
=== Club ===
Appearances and goals by club, season and competition
Club	Season	League			National cup (Note: Includes Coppa Italia, FA Cup)		Europe		Other		Total	
Club	Season	Division	Apps	Goals	Apps	Goals	Apps	Goals	Apps	Goals	Apps	Goals
Empoli	1990–91	Serie C1	1	0	—		—		—		1	0
Empoli	1991–92	Serie C1	7	4	—		—		—		7	4
Empoli	1992–93	Serie C1	13	6	—		—		—		13	6
Empoli	1993–94	Serie C1	0	0	—		—		—		0	0
Empoli	1994–95	Serie C1	30	17	—		—		—		30	17
Empoli	Total		51	27	—		—		—		51	27
Genoa	1995–96	Serie B	34	21	1	2	—		5 (Note: Appearances in Anglo-Italian Cup)	5	40	28
Sampdoria	1996–97	Serie A	28	22	2	2	—		—		30	24
Sampdoria	1997–98	Serie A	33	20	4	1	2 (Note: Appearances in UEFA Cup)	0	—		39	21
Sampdoria	1998–99	Serie A	22	12	1	1	6 (Note: Appearances in UEFA Intertoto Cup)	3	—		29	16
Sampdoria	Total		83	54	7	4	8	3	—		98	61
Roma	1999–2000	Serie A	31	18	3	0	7	3	—		41	21
Roma	2000–01	Serie A	28	13	2	2	8	3	—		38	18
Roma	2001–02	Serie A	19	13	0	0	6 (Note: Appearances in UEFA Champions League)	1	1 (Note: Appearance in Supercoppa Italiana)	1	26	15
Roma	2002–03	Serie A	29	9	5	2	11	0	—		45	11
Roma	2003–04	Serie A	11	5	0	0	3	0	—		14	5
Roma	2004–05	Serie A	37	21	6	1	3	1	—		46	23
Roma	2005–06	Serie A	13	1	0	0	3	1	—		16	2
Roma	2006–07	Serie A	12	3	2	3	3	0	0	0	17	6
Roma	2008–09	Serie A	12	0	1	0	2	0	0	0	15	0
Roma	Total		192	83	19	8	46	9	1	1	258	101
Fulham (loan)	2006–07	Premier League	10	3	5	3	—		—		15	6
Sampdoria (loan)	2007–08	Serie A	13	4	0	0	5	1	—		18	5
Total			383	192	32	17	59	16	6	6	480	228

=== International ===
Italy
Year	Apps	Goals
1999	2	0
2000	5	0
2001	4	1
2002	7	2
2003	–	–
2004	1	0
2005	1	0
Total	20	3

International goals

Scores and results list Italy's goal tally first.

#	Date	Venue	Opponent	Score	Result	Competition
1.	25 April 2001	Stadio Renato Curi, Perugia, Italy	South Africa	1–0	1–0	Friendly
2.	27 March 2002	Elland Road, Leeds, England	England	1–1	2–1	Friendly
3.	27 March 2002	Elland Road, Leeds, England	England	2–1	2–1	Friendly

== Managerial statistics ==
As of match played 5 October 2026

Managerial record by team and tenure
Team	Nat.	From	To	Record								Ref.
Team	Nat.	From	To	G	W	D	L	GF	GA	GD	Win %	Ref.
Roma (interim)	(Italy)	21 February 2011	1 June 2011	16	7	4	5	22	21	+1	43.75	
Catania	(Italy)	9 June 2011	5 June 2012	40	12	15	13	51	56	−5	30.00	
Fiorentina	(Italy)	11 June 2012	8 June 2015	153	81	32	40	258	167	+91	52.94	
Sampdoria	(Italy)	15 November 2015	28 June 2016	27	6	6	15	29	46	−17	22.22	
Milan	(Italy)	28 June 2016	27 November 2017	64	33	13	18	107	74	+33	51.56	
Sevilla	(Spain)	28 December 2017	28 April 2018	28	11	7	10	37	44	−7	39.29	
Fiorentina	(Italy)	10 April 2019	21 December 2019	27	6	7	14	28	37	−9	22.22	
Adana Demirspor	(Turkey)	1 September 2021	12 June 2023	76	38	17	21	154	103	+51	50.00	
Turkey	(Turkey)	21 September 2023	9 October 2026	40	21	5	14	66	58	+8	52.50	
Career Total				471	215	106	150	747	604	+143	45.65	

== Honours ==
=== Player ===
Genoa

- Anglo-Italian Cup: 1995–96

Roma

- Serie A: 2000–01
- Supercoppa Italiana: 2001

Italy

- UEFA European Championship runner-up: 2000

=== Manager ===
Milan

- Supercoppa Italiana: 2016

=== Individual ===
- Enzo Bearzot Award: 2013
- AS Roma Hall of Fame: 2013
- USSI EuroMed - Sustainability & Excellence Award: 2023

Orders

5th Class / Knight: Cavaliere Ordine al Merito della Repubblica Italiana: 2000
