= Giovanni Abate =

Italian footballer

Personal information
- Date of birth: 2 July 1981 (age 45)
- Place of birth: Crotone, Italy
- Height: 1.79 m (5 ft 10 in)
- Position: Striker

Team information
- Current team: Flaminia (assistant coach)

Senior career*
Years	Team	Apps	(Gls)
2001–2002	Palermo	3	(0)
2002–2003	Avellino	13	(1)
2003	Viterbese	6	(1)
2003–2004	Isernia	15	(2)
2004	Taranto	9	(1)
2004–2006	Gela	65	(14)
2006–2007	San Marino	33	(5)
2007–2009	Portogruaro	56	(14)
2009–2010	Mantova	12	(0)
2010–2011	Siracusa	27	(2)
2011–2015	Trapani	127	(32)
2015–2016	Brescia	19	(2)
2016–2017	Virtus Francavilla	36	(9)
2017–2018	Pro Piacenza	24	(1)
2018–2019	Flaminia	25	(2)

Managerial career
- 2019–2020: Viterbese (technical coach)
- 2020–2021: Viterbese (assistant)
- 2021–: Flaminia (assistant)
- * Club domestic league appearances and goals

Giovanni Abate (born 2 July 1981) is an Italian football coach and a former striker. He is an assistant coach with Flaminia. Previously he played for Pro Piacenza and various other teams in Italy.
