= Christian Karembeu =

French footballer (born 1970)

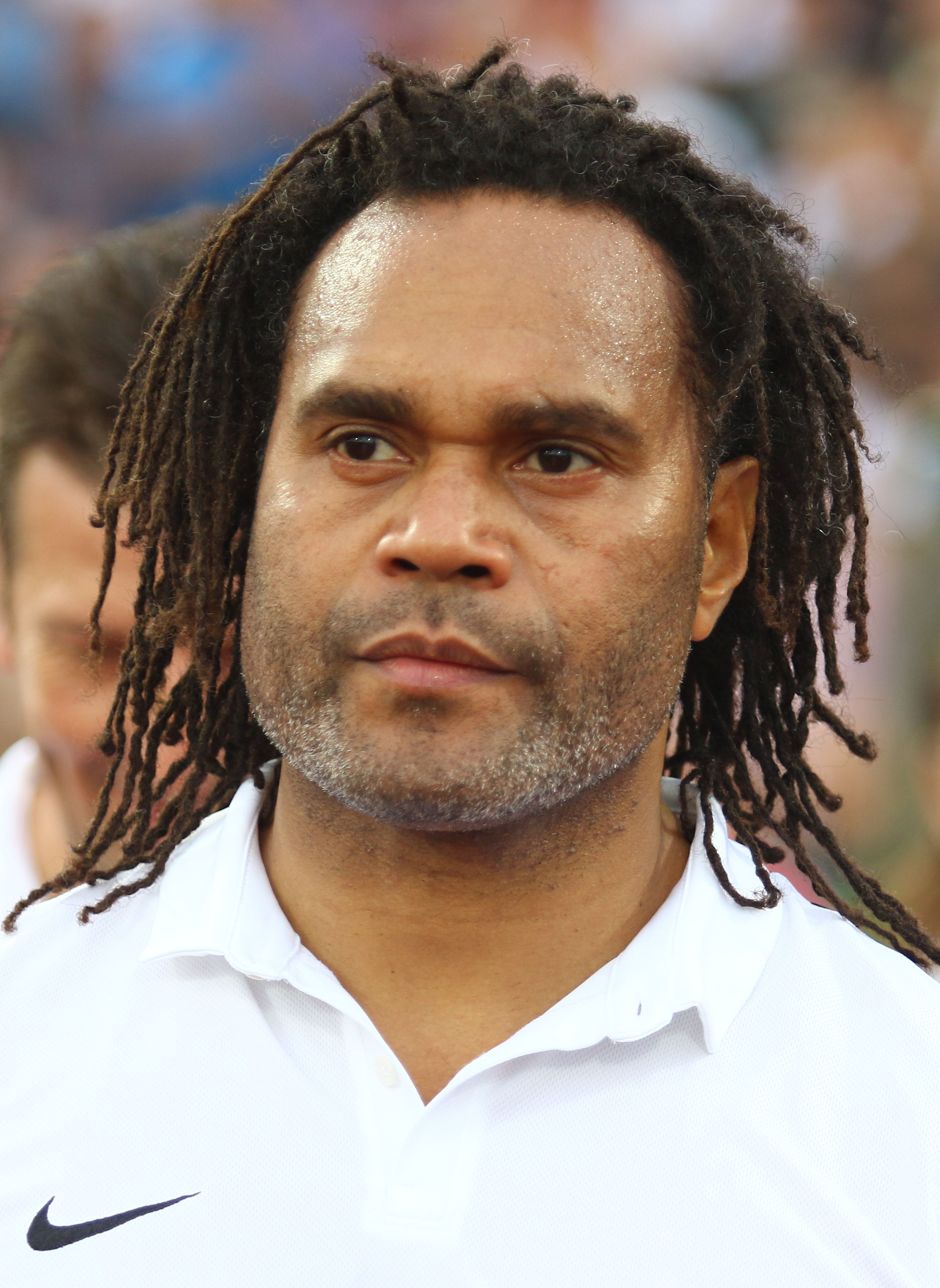
- Karembeu in 2017

Personal information
- Full name: Christian Lali Kake Karembeu
- Date of birth: 3 December 1970 (age 55)
- Place of birth: Lifou, New Caledonia
- Height: 1.78 m (5 ft 10 in)
- Position: Defensive midfielder

Team information
- Current team: Olympiacos (sports director)

Youth career
- Gaïtcha
- 1988–1990: Nantes

Senior career*
Years	Team	Apps	(Gls)
1990–1995	Nantes	130	(5)
1995–1997	Sampdoria	62	(6)
1997–2000	Real Madrid	51	(1)
2000–2001	Middlesbrough	33	(4)
2001–2004	Olympiacos	68	(3)
2004–2005	Servette	23	(2)
2005–2006	Bastia	7	(0)
Total		395	(18)

International career
1992–2002	France	53	(1)
Medal record
Men's football
Representing France
FIFA World Cup
Winner	1998
UEFA European Championship
Winner	2000
FIFA Confederations Cup
Winner	2001
- * Club domestic league appearances and goals

Christian Lali Kake Karembeu (born 3 December 1970) is a French former professional footballer who played as a defensive midfielder. Born in New Caledonia, he played for the France national team. He is currently the sporting director for Olympiacos.

Karembeu represented Nantes, Sampdoria, Real Madrid, Middlesbrough, Olympiacos, Servette, and Bastia. He found much success on the international stage as well representing France, having been born in the overseas territory New Caledonia, and was a vital part of the squad that won the 1998 FIFA World Cup on home soil and featured in one match in France's victorious UEFA Euro 2000 campaign.

== Early life ==
Karembeu was born in Lifou, New Caledonia, a French overseas territory in the Pacific Islands. He played youth football for Nouméa-based Gaïtcha FCN. At the age of 17, he moved to metropolitan France on a scholarship to study and play football. He was recruited as a youth player by FC Nantes and signed a professional contract with the club in 1990.

== Club career ==
During his career Karembeu played for Nantes (1990–95), Sampdoria (1995–97), Real Madrid (1997–2000), Middlesbrough (2000–01), Olympiacos (2001–04), Servette (2004–05) and Bastia (2005–06). With Real Madrid, he won the Champions League in 1998 and 2000, starting in the former but remaining on the bench for the latter. He also played for the Real Madrid Veterans against Barcelona in Qatar, on 13 November 2012. He last played midfield for Bastia in the French Ligue 1. He announced his retirement on 13 October 2006, although he added that he would "be having a kickabout from time to time". He also took part in a friendly competition for Kettering Town FC with Gianfranco Zola, Les Ferdinand and Gus Poyet.

== International career ==
Born in the French territory of New Caledonia, he was able to represent France on the international stage. He compiled 53 caps in his career, earning his first one on 14 November 1992 against Finland in a 2–1 victory during 1994 FIFA World Cup qualifying. He scored his only goal for France during 1996 UEFA Euro qualifying on 11 October 1995 during the 3–1 win against Romania.

Karembeu was a member of the French team that won the 1998 World Cup. He played in 4 matches in the tournament, including starts in the quarter-final, semi-final, and final, totalling 242 minutes.

He was also part of the victorious French team at Euro 2000.

== Style of play ==
Described as a "complete midfielder" by Paul Sarahs of FourFourTwo, Karembeu was a physically imposing, energetic, and technically gifted two-way midfielder, who was known for his range of passing, dribbling skills, stamina, and hard-tackling playing style; he usually played in a holding role in midfield, although he was also capable of playing in various other positions, including in a box-to-box role, as a right–sided midfielder, or even as a right-back. Regarding his playing style and role in France's victory in the 1998 World Cup final, Michael Cox of ESPN FC described him as "a peculiar hybrid of a wing-back and a box-to-box midfielder," who "shuttled up and down on the right of a very defensive three-man midfield."

== Post-retirement career ==
On 9 December 2005, Karembeu represented the Oceania Football Confederation at the draw for the 2006 World Cup which took place in Leipzig, Germany.

In May 2006 Karembeu became a scout for English Premiership side Portsmouth Football Club. In 2007, he was appointed as non-executive director of Birmingham International Holdings. He left after 2010 annual general meeting. However, in August 2009, Karembeu decided to join Arsenal's ever expanding scouting network.

In June 2013, Karembeu was handed an administrative role at Greek club Olympiacos along with former South African footballer Pierre Issa.

== Commitment ==
Karembeu is a member of the 'Champions for Peace' club, a group of 54 famous elite athletes committed to serving peace in the world through sport, created by Peace and Sport, a Monaco-based international organization.

Deeply involved in Peace and Sport's activities, Karembeu visited Haiti in August 2010 with Founder and President of Peace and Sport, Joel Bouzou, to strengthen the role of sport in the country's reconstruction efforts and attract the attention of the international community to urgent needs that prevail there. He went to meet sports instructors and young beneficiaries of the emergency program that the Haitian Olympic Committee has set up in survivor camps.

== Personal life ==
The great-grandfather of Karembeu, who came from New Caledonia, was one of a hundred Kanaks taken to Paris in 1931 for the Paris Colonial Exposition and exhibited there as "cannibals". Later the "cannibals" were swapped with Germany for some crocodiles. Karembeu refuses to sing France's national anthem, "La Marseillaise", due to the colonial past of the country.

Karembeu was married to Slovak model Adriana Sklenařiková, whom he met on an aeroplane. The couple split in March 2011 and divorced in December 2012. Their marriage was childless. In May 2017, Karembeu married Jackie Chamoun, a Lebanese skier, in Greece, followed by a wedding ceremony in Lebanon. The couple announced the birth of their daughter on 27 September 2017.

Following the 1998 World Cup, he was made a Knight of the Legion of Honour in 1998.

== Television ==
Karembeu is the host of French TV series Des Îles et des Hommes (Of Islands and Men), aired on Planète in 2010 and 2011, a travel programme visiting among six of the most beautiful islands of the world. He also became part of the ITV broadcast team for Euro 2016.

== Career statistics ==
=== Club ===
Appearances and goals by club, season and competition
Club	Season	League			National Cup		League Cup		Europe		Total	
Club	Season	Division	Apps	Goals	Apps	Goals	Apps	Goals	Apps	Goals	Apps	Goals
Nantes	1990–91	Division 1	4	0	1	0	–		–		5	0
Nantes	1991–92	Division 1	28	0	0	0	–		–		28	0
Nantes	1992–93	Division 1	35	2	3	1	–		–		38	3
Nantes	1993–94	Division 1	29	0	4	0	–		2 (Note: Appearances in UEFA Cup)	0	35	0
Nantes	1994–95	Division 1	34	3	1	0	2	0	7	0	44	3
Nantes	Total		130	5	9	1	2	0	9	0	150	6
Sampdoria	1995–96	Serie A	32	5	2	0	–		–		34	5
Sampdoria	1996–97	Serie A	30	1	2	0	–		–		32	1
Sampdoria	Total		62	6	4	0	0	0	0	0	66	6
Real Madrid	1997–98	La Liga	16	0	2	0	–		5 (Note: Appearances in UEFA Champions League)	3	23	3
Real Madrid	1998–99	La Liga	20	0	5	0	–		6 (Note: Five appearances in UEFA Champions League, one appearance in UEFA Super Cup)	0	31	0
Real Madrid	1999–2000	La Liga	15	0	5	0	–		8 (Note: Five appearances in UEFA Champions League and three appearances in FIFA Club World Cup)	1	28	1
Real Madrid	Total		51	0	12	0	0	0	19	4	82	4
Middlesbrough	2000–01	Premier League	33	4	2	0	1	0	–		36	4
Olympiacos	2001–02	Alpha Ethniki	24	1	7	1	–		6	0	37	2
Olympiacos	2002–03	Alpha Ethniki	22	2	1	0	–		6	0	29	2
Olympiacos	2003–04	Alpha Ethniki	22	0	5	0	–		6	0	33	0
Olympiacos	Total		68	3	13	1	0	0	18	0	99	4
Servette	2004–05	Swiss Super League	12	0	2	0	–		–		14	0
Bastia	2005–06	Ligue 1	7	0	0	0	0	0	–		7	0
Total			395	18	42	0	3	0	46	4	486	22

=== International ===
Appearances and goals by national team and year
National team	Year	Apps	Goals
France	1992	1	0
France	1993	0	0
France	1994	6	0
France	1995	4	1
France	1996	13	0
France	1997	4	0
France	1998	10	0
France	1999	4	0
France	2000	4	0
France	2001	6	0
France	2002	1	0
Total		53	1

France score listed first, score column indicates score after each Karembeu goal

List of international goals scored by Christian Karembeu
No.	Date	Venue	Cap	Opponent	Score	Result	Competition	Ref.
1	11 October 1995	Stadionul Steaua, Bucharest, Romania	10	Romania	1–0	3–1	1996 UEFA Euro qualification	

== Honours ==
Nantes

- Division 1: 1994–95

Real Madrid

- UEFA Champions League: 1997–98, 1999–2000

Olympiacos

- Alpha Ethniki: 2001–02, 2002–03

France

- FIFA World Cup: 1998
- UEFA European Championship: 2000
- FIFA Confederations Cup: 2001

Individual

- Oceania Footballer of the Year: 1995, 1998
- UNFP 20 Year Special Team Trophy: 2011
- Olympiacos Golden Eleven

Orders

- Knight of the Legion of Honour: 1998
