= Nicola Zanini =

Italian coach and former football player (born 1974)

Personal information
- Date of birth: 26 March 1974 (age 52)
- Place of birth: Vicenza, Italy
- Height: 1.80 m (5 ft 11 in)
- Position: Midfielder

Youth career
- Juventus

Senior career*
| Years | Team | Apps | (Gls) |
| 1990–92 | Juventus | 1 | (0) |
| 1992–93 | Sampdoria | 1 | (0) |
| 1993–94 | Mantova | 20 | (1) |
| 1994–95 | Pistoiese | 32 | (11) |
| 1995–96 | Verona | 35 | (7) |
| 1996 | Sampdoria | 3 | (0) |
| 1996–97 | Verona (on loan) | 26 | (2) |
| 1997 | Sampdoria | 3 | (0) |
| 1997–99 | Atalanta | 42 | (1) |
| 1999–01 | Pescara | 35 | (8) |
| 2001 | Monza | 17 | (4) |
| 2001–02 | Como | 19 | (4) |
| 2002–03 | Triestina (on loan) | 32 | (7) |
| 2003–04 | Napoli | 36 | (5) |
| 2004–05 | Genoa | 34 | (5) |
| 2006 | Ascoli | 7 | (0) |
| 2006–2008 | Vicenza | 38 | (0) |
| 2008–2009 | Albignasego | 28 | (7) |
| 2009–2010 | Treviso | | |

Managerial career
- 2010: Treviso
- 2014–2015: Real Vicenza (youth)
- 2015–2017: Vicenza (youth)
- 2017–2018: Vicenza
- 2018: Vicenza
- 2018–2020: Este
- 2020–2022: Luparense
- 2022: Sona
- 2023: Sona
- 2023–2025: Dolomiti Bellunesi
- * Club domestic league appearances and goals

Nicola Zanini (born 26 March 1974) is an Italian coach and former football player.

== Playing career ==
A youth product of Juventus, Zanini played over 10 seasons as a midfielder in the Italian Serie B and 50 games in Serie A. He retired in 2010 after a short stint with Treviso.

== Coaching career ==
Zanini moved into coaching in January 2010 after being promoted to head coach for his playing team Treviso. He then went on a career as a youth coach, first with Real Vicenza, and later with his former team Vicenza. He then served as head coach of Vicenza on two different stints during the 2017–18 Serie C campaign, guiding them to safety after winning a relegation playoff to Santarcangelo.

On 2018, after his experience with Vicenza, he took over the reins of Serie D club Este. He left Este in 2020 for Luparense, another Serie D club from the region. He left Luparense in 2022 for fellow Serie D club Sona, but was sacked on 10 October 2022 due to negative results. He was successively briefly recalled, but failed to save the club from relegation.

On 28 May 2023, Zanini was unveiled as the new head coach of Dolomiti Bellunesi, another Serie D club. In 2025, Zanini guided Dolomiti Bellunesi to their first historical promotion to Serie C. He was dismissed from his coaching post on 8 October 2025 after a 0–4 loss to Pro Vercelli.
