= Marco Carparelli =

Italian footballer (born 1976)

Personal information
- Date of birth: 4 June 1976 (age 50)
- Place of birth: Finale Ligure, Italy
- Height: 1.80 m (5 ft 11 in)
- Position: Striker

Team information
- Current team: Soccer Borghetto

Senior career*
Years	Team	Apps	(Gls)
1992–1993	Vado	5	(0)
1993–1997	Sampdoria	28	(6)
1995–1996	→ Chievo (loan)	13	(0)
1997–1998	Torino	29	(7)
1998–1999	Empoli	22	(5)
1999–2002	Genoa	129	(42)
2003	Empoli	13	(1)
2004	Como	23	(12)
2004–2005	Genoa	10	(0)
2004	→ Siena (loan)	8	(0)
2005–2007	Cremonese	70	(29)
2007–2009	Grosseto	24	(7)
2009	→ Cittadella (loan)	15	(1)
2009–2012	Pisa	67	(26)
2012–2014	Pietra Ligure		
2015–2017	San Francesco Loano		
2017–	Soccer Borghetto		
- * Club domestic league appearances and goals

Marco Carparelli (born 4 June 1976) is an Italian footballer who plays as a striker for an amateur side Soccer Borghetto.

== Career ==
=== Player ===
Carparelli started his career at Vado of Serie D. He then transferred to Sampdoria, and made his Serie A debut on 21 September 1996, A.S. Roma 1-4 lose to Sampdoria, after spent a year at Serie B for Chievo. He then played for Torino (Serie B) and Empoli (Serie A). He joined Genoa of Serie B in summer 1999, and left for Empoli of Serie A again in January 2003.

He played for Empoli until January 2004, while he left for Como for their remain Serie B campaign, but Como finished the last in the table. Carparelli signed for Genoa again, also at Serie B. But he left on loan for A.C. Siena of Serie A in the first half of the season.

In summer 2005, he joined Cremonese, due to Genoa match fixing and relegated and followed to club to fall to Serie C1 in summer 2006.

In July 2007 joined to Serie B newcomer Grosseto and in October 2009 moved to Pisa until the end of the season 2011–12.

Since the summer 2012 he played for Pietra Ligure in Prima Categoria Liguria/A.
