= Simone Vergassola =

Italian footballer

Personal information
- Date of birth: 24 January 1976 (age 50)
- Place of birth: La Spezia, Italy
- Height: 1.74 m (5 ft 9 in)
- Position: Midfielder

Youth career
- ASD Sarzana

Senior career*
Years	Team	Apps	(Gls)
1992–1996	Carrarese	71	(5)
1996–2001	Sampdoria	114	(11)
2001–2003	Torino	77	(5)
2003–2015	Siena	334	(26)
Total		596	(47)

Managerial career
- 2017–?: Siena (assistant coach)
- * Club domestic league appearances and goals

Simone Vergassola (born 24 January 1976) is an Italian former footballer who played as a midfielder.
