= Mattia Biso =

Italian football midfielder

Personal information
- Date of birth: 6 May 1977 (age 49)
- Place of birth: Milan, Italy
- Height: 1.80 m (5 ft 11 in)
- Position: Central midfielder

Youth career
- Sampdoria

Senior career*
| Years | Team | Apps | (Gls) |
| 1995–1996 | Derthona | 30 | (2) |
| 1996–1998 | Sampdoria | 0 | (0) |
| 1997–1998 | → Carrarese (loan) | 5 | (0) |
| 1998 | → Tempio (loan) | 26 | (1) |
| 1998–1999 | Lecco | 19 | (1) |
| 1999–2000 | Fidelis Andria | 7 | (0) |
| 2000 | Faenza | 13 | (0) |
| 2000 | San Marino | 13 | (2) |
| 2001–2002 | Mestre | 22 | (2) |
| 2002–2004 | Teramo | 61 | (1) |
| 2003–2005 | Ascoli | 50 | (3) |
| 2006–2007 | Catania | 29 | (2) |
| 2007 | → Spezia (loan) | 19 | (0) |
| 2008–2011 | Frosinone | 56 | (2) |
| 2011 | Fidene | 3 | (0) |
| 2012 | Monza | 12 | (0) |
| 2012–2013 | Civitanovese | 18 | (7) |
| 2013–2014 | Ancona | 18 | (3) |
| 2014 | Bastia | 8 | (0) |
| 2014–2015 | Sangiovannese | 13 | (1) |
| 2015–2016 | Fezzanese | 14 | (1) |

Managerial career
- 2018: Pergolese
- 2018–2019: Spezia (U17)
- 2019–2020: Spezia (U19 assistant)
- 2021: Frosinone (technical coach)
- 2021–2022: Spezia (technical director)
- * Club domestic league appearances and goals

Mattia Biso (born 6 May 1977) is an Italian football coach and a former midfielder.
