= Vincenzo Iacopino =

Italian footballer

Personal information
- Date of birth: 9 August 1976 (age 50)
- Place of birth: Ventimiglia, Italy
- Height: 1.78 m (5 ft 10 in)
- Position: Midfielder

Senior career*
Years	Team	Apps	(Gls)
1994–2005	Sampdoria	70	(5)
1997–1998	→ Verona (loan)	17	(0)
2000–2001	→ Empoli (loan)	55	(8)
2003	→ Catania (loan)	6	(0)
2003–2004	→ Lucchese (loan)	32	(2)
2006	AlbinoLeffe	9	(3)
2006–2012	Monza	156	(10)
- * Club domestic league appearances and goals

Vincenzo Iacopino (born 9 August 1976) is an Italian former professional footballer who played as a midfielder. Most notably, he played four seasons in the Serie A for Sampdoria.

On 18 June 2012, Alberti was banned for three years and six month as a result of the 2011–12 Italian scandal.
