= Marco Franceschetti =

Italian footballer

Personal information
- Date of birth: 19 January 1967 (age 59)
- Place of birth: Milan, Italy
- Height: 1.83 m (6 ft 0 in)
- Position: Defender

Youth career
- –1986: AC Milan

Senior career*
Years	Team	Apps	(Gls)
1985–1986	AC Milan	0	(0)
1986–1987	Sambenedettese	0	(0)
1987–1988	Pro Vercelli	23	(0)
1988–1989	Legnano	20	(2)
1989–1991	Pergocrema	57	(4)
1991–1995	Padova	128	(6)
1995–1999	Sampdoria	92	(4)
1999–2001	Hellas Verona	26	(0)
2001–2002	Fiorentina	1	(0)
2002–2003	Legnano	22	(0)
Total		369	(16)

Managerial career
- 2003–2004: Venezia (assistant)
- 2005–: Francesport (owner)
- * Club domestic league appearances and goals

Marco Franceschetti (born 19 January 1967), is an Italian former professional footballer who played as a defender.

== Career ==
Revealed in AC Milan's youth sectors, Marco Franceschetti was champion of the Coppa Italia Primavera for the club in 1984–85, but without playing once for the main team. He played mainly for Padova in Serie B for four seasons, and for Sampdoria, Hellas Verona and Fiorentina in Serie A. After retiring, he was Angelo Gregucci's assistant at Venezia, and after this period, founded a team in the comune of Maccagno called Francesport.

== Honours ==
AC Milan (youth)

- Coppa Italia Primavera: 1984–85
