= David Balleri =

Italian footballer (born 1969)

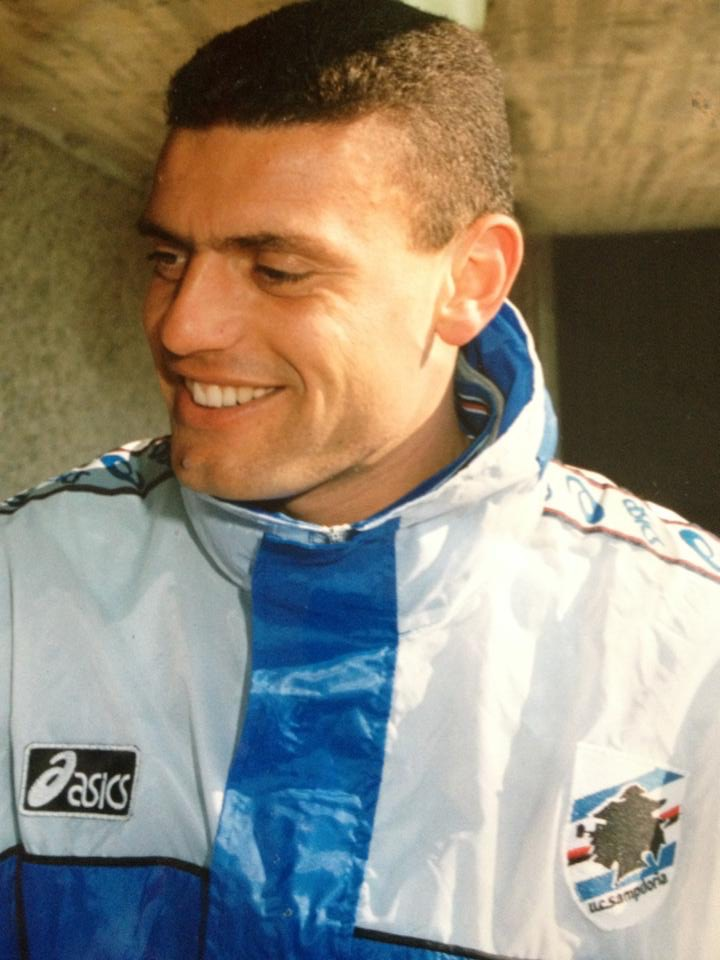
- David Balleri pictured during his time at Sampdoria.

Personal information
- Date of birth: 28 March 1969 (age 57)
- Place of birth: Livorno, Italy
- Height: 1.83 m (6 ft 0 in)
- Position: Defender

Senior career*
Years	Team	Apps	(Gls)
1986–1987	Cuoio Pelli	2	(0)
1987–1989	Cerretese	48	(1)
1989–1990	Cuoio Pelli	24	(1)
1990–1992	Siracusa	55	(1)
1992–1993	Cosenza	34	(2)
1993–1994	Parma	20	(1)
1994–1995	Padova	31	(1)
1995–1999	Sampdoria	116	(4)
1999–2002	Lecce	76	(1)
2002–2008	Livorno	163	(0)
2008–2009	Como	24	(0)
2009–2010	Pro Livorno		
Total		593	(12)
- * Club domestic league appearances and goals

David Balleri (born 28 March 1969) is an Italian former footballer who played as a defender.

== Career ==
On 22 October 2006, Balleri played his 300th Serie A match, in a 0–0 tie against Siena; he had played his first Serie A match on 8 September 1993.

In 2009–10 season he played for Pro Livorno in Prima Categoria Toscana. He retired after obtaining a UEFA A coaching license, which made him eligible to coach Lega Pro teams. He remains as coach of the Pro Livorno Juniores Regionali youth team.

== Personal life ==
Davide's father Costanzo Balleri also played and coached football professionally.

== Honours ==
Parma

- UEFA Super Cup: 1993
- UEFA Cup Winners' Cup: (Runner-up) 1993–94
