= Matteo Sereni =

Italian footballer

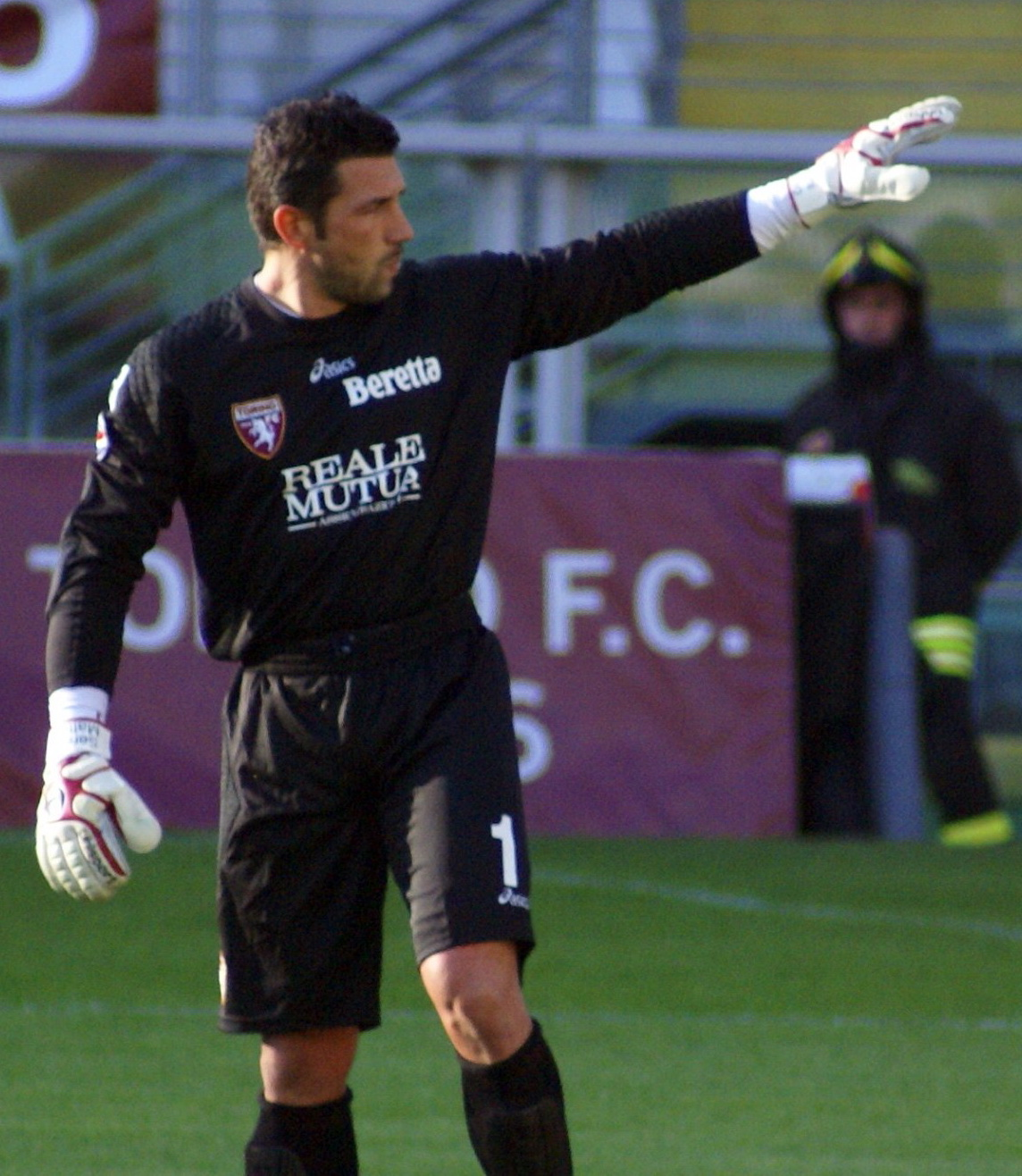
- Sereni playing for Torino in 2008

Personal information
- Date of birth: 11 February 1975 (age 51)
- Place of birth: Parma, Italy
- Height: 1.86 m (6 ft 1 in)
- Position: Goalkeeper

Youth career
- 1993–1995: Sampdoria
- 1994–1995: → Crevalcore (loan)

Senior career*
Years	Team	Apps	(Gls)
1995–2001	Sampdoria	85	(0)
1997–1998	→ Piacenza (loan)	34	(0)
1998–1999	→ Empoli (loan)	30	(0)
2001–2003	Ipswich Town	25	(0)
2002–2003	→ Brescia (loan)	24	(0)
2003–2007	Lazio	31	(0)
2006	→ Treviso (loan)	7	(0)
2007–2010	Torino	98	(0)
2010–2011	Brescia	15	(0)
Total		349	(0)

International career
1995–1997	Italy U21	4	(0)
- * Club domestic league appearances and goals

Matteo Sereni (born 11 February 1975) is an Italian former footballer who played as a goalkeeper.

== Career ==
Born in Parma, Sereni started his career at Sampdoria, and was loaned out to Crevalcore in 1994. He returned to Sampdoria and only made 10 appearances before being transferred to Piacenza in 1997. There, he helped the club avoid relegation to Serie B, but in 1998 he transferred to Empoli, where he failed to avoid relegation.

In 1999, Sereni returned to Sampdoria in Serie B and made 75 (out of 76) Serie B appearances. In 2001, Ipswich Town signed him for £4.5 million, which was the highest transfer fee paid by the club, until the acquisition of Omari Hutchinson in 2024. He failed to avoid relegation with Ipswich and was loaned to Brescia in 2002.

=== Lazio ===
In 2003, he transferred to Lazio, for €550,000 to compete for the number one goalkeeping slot with Angelo Peruzzi. In 2004, he started for the club in both legs of the 2004 Coppa Italia final against Juventus and played the matches in the 2005 UEFA Intertoto Cup, when Lazio went out to Marseille in the semi-finals.

In January 2006, he was loaned out to Treviso, with Samir Handanović going to Lazio on loan in return. He returned to Lazio for the 2006–07 campaign, but did not play a single match, being excluded from the roster for the whole season.

=== Torino ===
In June 2007 he signed for Torino in a free transfer to replace Christian Abbiati, signed a two-year contract. In November 2008, he signed a new contract which last until June 2011.

=== Brescia ===
On 5 July 2010 he was signed by Brescia for on free transfer. A few days before the last game of Serie A, his contract was mutually terminated, following the club's relegation a few weeks before.

=== International career ===
He was internationally selected at the age of 16 for the Italy national under-17 team, and played for the Italy national under-23 team at the 1997 Mediterranean Games, where Italy were champions.

== Legal challenges ==
After divorcing his ex-wife Silvia, Sereni was accused of having raped their daughter during a 2009 holiday on Sardinia's Costa Smeralda. He denied the charges. In 2015, Sereni was found guilty, and was sentenced to three years and six months in prison. In July 2017, Sereni's conviction was annulled on appeal and he was scheduled a new trial in Turin.

== Career statistics ==
=== Club ===
Appearances and goals by club, season and competition
Club	Season	League			Coppa Italia		Europe		Other		Total	
Club	Season	Division	Apps	Goals	Apps	Goals	Apps	Goals	Apps	Goals	Apps	Goals
Sampdoria	1995–96	Serie A	4	0	0	0	—		—		4	0
Sampdoria	1996–97	Serie A	6	0	0	0	—		—		6	0
Sampdoria	1999–2000	Serie B	37	0	7	0	—		—		44	0
Sampdoria	2000–01	Serie B	38	0	7	0	—		—		45	0
Sampdoria	2001–02	Serie B	0	0	1	0	—		—		1	0
Sampdoria	Total		85	0	15	0	—		—		100	0
Piacenza (loan)	1997–98	Serie A	34	0	1	0	—		—		35	0
Empoli (loan)	1998–99	Serie A	30	0	2	0	—		—		32	0
Ipswich Town	2001–02	Premier League	25	0	0	0	6	0	2	0	33	0
Brescia (loan)	2002–03	Serie A	24	0	0	0	—		—		24	0
Lazio	2003–04	Serie A	9	0	8	0	1	0	—		18	0
Lazio	2004–05	Serie A	20	0	1	0	4	0	0	0	25	0
Lazio	2005–06	Serie A	2	0	0	0	4	0	—		6	0
Lazio	Total		31	0	9	0	9	0	0	0	49	0
Treviso (loan)	2005–06	Serie A	7	0	—		—		—		7	0
Torino	2007–08	Serie A	32	0	1	0	—		—		33	0
Torino	2008–09	Serie A	31	0	1	0	—		—		32	0
Torino	2009–10	Serie B	35	0	2	0	—		—		37	0
Torino	Total		98	0	4	0	—		—		102	0
Brescia	2010–11	Serie A	15	0	0	0	—		—		15	0
Career total			349	0	31	0	15	0	2	0	397	0
