= 1998–99 Bologna FC 1909 season =

Bologna
1998–99 season
- President: Giuseppe Gazzoni Frascara
- Manager: Carlo Mazzone
- Stadium: Renato Dall'Ara
- Serie A: 9th
- Coppa Italia: Semi-finals
- UEFA Intertoto Cup: Winners
- UEFA Cup: Semi-finals
- Top goalscorer: Giuseppe Signori (15)
Home colours	Away colours	Third colours

During the 1998–99 season Bologna competed in Serie A, Coppa Italia and UEFA Cup.

== Season summary ==
Carlo Mazzone guided Bologna to the semi-finals of both the UEFA Cup and Coppa Italia, and ensured European qualification again after victory over Inter Milan in the play-offs. He then left for Perugia.

== Kit ==
Bologna's kit was manufactured by Italian company Diadora and sponsored by Granarolo.

== First-team squad ==
Squad at end of season

Note: Flags indicate national team as defined under FIFA eligibility rules; some limited exceptions apply. Players may hold more than one non-FIFA nationality.

No.	Pos.	Nation	Player
1	GK	ITA	Francesco Antonioli
2	DF	ITA	Cristian Zaccardo
3	DF	ITA	Michele Paramatti
4	DF	ITA	Massimo Paganin
5	MF	ITA	Giancarlo Marocchi
6	DF	ITA	Massimo Tarantino
7	MF	ITA	Carlo Nervo
8	MF	SWE	Klas Ingesson
9	FW	RUS	Igor Kolyvanov
10	FW	ITA	Giuseppe Signori
12	GK	ITA	Marco Roccati
13	DF	ITA	Nicola Boselli
14	FW	FRA	Christophe Sanchez
15	MF	BRA	Eriberto
16	MF	ITA	Massimiliano Cappioli

No.	Pos.	Nation	Player
17	FW	ITA	Giovanni Pompei
18	MF	ITA	Davide Fontolan
19	FW	SWE	Kennet Andersson
20	FW	RUS	Igor Simutenkov
21	MF	ITA	Jonatan Binotto
22	GK	ITA	Alex Brunner
23	DF	ITA	Alessandro Rinaldi
24	DF	ITA	Amedeo Mangone
25	DF	ITA	Giovanni Bia
26	DF	ITA	Stefano Bettarini (on loan from Fiorentina)
27	FW	ITA	Claudio Gallicchio
28	FW	ITA	Giacomo Cipriani
30	MF	ITA	Giampiero Maini
31	DF	SWE	Teddy Lučić

=== Transfers ===
In
Pos.	Name	from	Type
FW	Giuseppe Signori	Lazio	co-ownership
MF	Eriberto	Palmeiras	
FW	Igor Simutenkov	Reggiana	
MF	Klas Ingesson	Bari	
FW	Christophe Sanchez	Montpellier	
MF	Jonatan Binotto	Juventus	free
DF	Alessandro Rinaldi	Ravenna	
DF	Giovanni Bia	Brescia	

Out
Pos.	Name	To	Type
FW	Roberto Baggio	Inter	
DF	Stefano Torrisi	Atletico Madrid	
GK	Giorgio Sterchele	Roma	loan ended
MF	Igor Shalimov	Napoli	
DF	Daniele Carnasciali	Venezia	
DF	Giovanni Dall'Igna	Ravenna	
MF	Andres Martinez	Defensor Sporting	
FW	Mohamed Kallon	Inter	loan ended

==== Winter ====
In
Pos.	Name	from	Type
MF	Giampiero Maini	A.C. Milan	
DF	Teddy Lučić	IFK Goteborg	
MF	Massimiliano Cappioli	Atalanta	
DF	Stefano Bettarini	Fiorentina	loan

Out
Pos.	Name	To	Type
MF	Oscar Magoni	Napoli	

=== Left club during season ===
Note: Flags indicate national team as defined under FIFA eligibility rules; some limited exceptions apply. Players may hold more than one non-FIFA nationality.

No.	Pos.	Nation	Player
31	MF	ITA	Oscar Magoni (to Napoli)

== Competitions ==
=== Serie A ===
==== League table ====
Pos	Team	Pld	W	D	L	GF	GA	GD	Pts	Qualification or relegation
7	Juventus (Note: Juventus qualified to the 1999 UEFA Intertoto Cup Third round.)	34	15	9	10	42	36	+6	54	Qualification to Intertoto Cup third round
8	Inter Milan	34	13	7	14	59	54	+5	46	
9	Bologna (Note: Bologna gained entry to the 1999–2000 UEFA Cup winning the cup third place UEFA Cup qualification match against Inter Milan)	34	11	11	12	44	47	−3	44	Qualification to UEFA Cup first round
10	Bari	34	9	15	10	39	44	−5	42 (Note: BAR 1–0 VEN, VEN 2–1 BAR)	
11	Venezia	34	11	9	14	38	45	−7	42	

Source: Serie A, RSSSF.com, Soccerway
Rules for classification: 1) Points; 2) Head-to-head points; 3) Head-to-head goal difference; 4) Goal difference; 5) Goals scored; 6) Draw. (Note: Head-to-head record is used only after all the matches between the teams in question have been played).

==== Results by round ====
Round	1	2	3	4	5	6	7	8	9	10	11	12	13	14	15	16	17	18	19	20	21	22	23	24	25	26	27	28	29	30	31	32	33	34
Ground	A	H	A	H	A	H	A	H	A	H	H	A	H	A	H	A	H	H	A	H	A	H	A	H	A	H	A	A	H	A	H	A	H	A
Result	L	L	D	D	D	W	W	D	W	D	W	L	D	W	L	D	W	L	L	W	D	W	L	W	L	W	D	D	W	L	L	L	D	L
Position	15	17	17	16	15	15	15	10	13	8	7	6	7	7	8	10	8	9	10	8	9	9	9	9	9	8	9	9	8	8	9	9	9	9

Source: Competitive matches
A = Away; H = Home; W = Win; D = Draw; L = Loss; P = Postponed; = Leader, 1999–2000 UEFA Champions League Group stage; = 1999–2000 UEFA Champions League Group stage; = 1999–2000 UEFA Champions League Qualifying round; = 1999–2000 UEFA Cup First round; = Qualification to Intertoto Cup; = 1999–2000 Serie B; b = 1998–99 UEFA Cup qualification; c = 1999–2000 UEFA Cup First round after won the 1998–99 UEFA Cup qualification playoff.

==== Matches ====
Win Draw Loss

12 September 1998 1	A.C. Milan	3–0	Bologna	Milan
20:30 CEST	Bierhoff 45', 51' (pen.); Leonardo 81'	Report		Stadium: Giuseppe Meazza; Referee: Bazzoli

20 September 1998 2	Bologna	1–3	Udinese	Bologna
15:00 CEST	Kolyvanov 62' (pen.)	Report	14', 44' (pen.) Amoroso; 85' Walem	Stadium: Renato Dall'Ara; Referee: Bazzoli

26 September 1998 3	Bari	0–0	Bologna	Bari
16:00 CEST		Report		Stadium: Stadio San Nicola; Referee: Rodomonti

4 October 1998 4	Bologna	0–0	Parma	Bologna
15:00 CEST		Report		Stadium: Renato Dall'Ara; Referee: Messina

17 October 1998 5	Empoli	0–0	Bologna	Empoli
15:00 CEST		Report		Stadium: Stadio Carlo Castellani; Referee: Tombolini

25 October 1998 6	Bologna	3–1	Piacenza	Bologna
15:00 CET	Nervo 51'; Andersson 59', 72'	Report	51' (o.g.) Mangone	Stadium: Renato Dall'Ara; Referee: Rodomonti

31 October 1998 7	Venezia	0–2	Bologna	Venezia
15:00 CET		Report	72' Binotto; 90+5' Eriberto	Stadium: Stadio Pier Luigi Penzo; Referee: Bazzoli

8 November 1998 8	Bologna	1–1	Roma	Bologna
20:30 CET	Signori 18'	Report	15' Paulo Sérgio	Stadium: Renato Dall'Ara; Referee: Trentalange

15 November 1998 9	Vicenza	0–4	Bologna	Vicenza
20:30 CET		Report	34' (pen.), 73', 77' Signori; 90' Kolyvanov	Stadium: Romeo Menti; Referee: Treossi

21 November 1998 10	Bologna	1–1	Perugia	Bologna
15:00 CET	Binotto 42'	Report	37' Rapaic	Stadium: Renato Dall'Ara; Referee: Messina

29 November 1998 11	Bologna	3–0	Juventus	Bologna
15:00 CET	Paramatti 3'; Signori 9'; Fontolan 28'	Report		Stadium: Renato Dall'Ara; Referee: Cesari

5 December 1998 12	Fiorentina	1–0	Bologna	Florence
15:00 CET	Batistuta 56'	Report		Stadium: Artemio Franchi; Referee: Braschi

13 December 1998 13	Bologna	1–1	Salernitana	Bologna
15:00 CET	Signori 17'	Report	31' (o.g.) Paramatti	Stadium: Renato Dall'Ara; Referee: Rodomonti

20 December 1998 14	Cagliari	0–1	Bologna	Cagliari
15:00 CET		Report	38' Signori	Stadium: Stadio Sant'Elia; Referee: Bolognino

6 January 1999 15	Bologna	0–1	Lazio	Bologna
20:30 CET		Report	78' Vieri	Stadium: Renato Dall'Ara; Referee: Ceccarini

10 January 1999 16	Sampdoria	1–1	Bologna	Genoa
15:00 CET	Palmieri 63'	Report	13' Signori	Stadium: Stadio Luigi Ferraris; Referee: Tombolini

17 January 1999 17	Bologna	2–0	Inter	Bologna
15:00 CET	Signori 41' (pen.); Fontolan 52'	Report		Stadium: Renato Dall'Ara; Referee: Boggi

24 January 1999 18	Bologna	2–3	A.C. Milan	Bologna
15:00 CET	Signori 15', 44'	Report	21' Guglielminpietro; 53' (o.g.) Magoni; 90' N'Gotty	Stadium: Renato Dall'Ara; Referee: Borriello

31 January 1999 19	Udinese	2–0	Bologna	Udine
15:00 CET	Sosa 13', 74'	Report		Stadium: Stadio Friuli; Referee: Cesari

7 February 1999 20	Bologna	3–1	Bari	Bologna
15:00 CET	Signori 37'; Andersson 47'; Kolyvanov 90'	Report	6' Knudsen	Stadium: Renato Dall'Ara; Referee: Cesari

14 February 1999 21	Parma	1–1	Bologna	Parma
15:00 CET	Stanić 91'	Report	23' Kolyvanov	Stadium: Il Tardini; Referee: Bolognino

21 February 1999 22	Bologna	2–0	Empoli	Bologna
15:00 CET	Binotto 16'; Signori 81'	Report		Stadium: Renato Dall'Ara; Referee: Braschi

27 February 1999 23	Piacenza	5–0	Bologna	Piacenza
15:00 CET	Inzaghi 20' (pen.), 38' (pen.), 86'; Rastelli 43'; Piovani 84' (pen.)	Report		Stadium: Garilli; Referee: De Santis

7 March 1999 24	Bologna	2–1	Venezia	Bologna
15:00 CET	Andersson 72'; Signori 85'	Report	72' (pen.) Maniero	Stadium: Renato Dall'Ara; Referee: Ceccarini

14 March 1999 25	Roma	3–1	Bologna	Rome
15:00 CET	Delvecchio 10', 39'; Gautieri 61'	Report	68' Andersson	Stadium: Olimpico; Referee: Bazzoli

21 March 1999 26	Bologna	4–2	Vicenza	Bologna
15:00 CET	Nervo 2'; Simutenkov 78'; Andersson 82'; Ingesson 90'	Report	42', 85' Otero	Stadium: Renato Dall'Ara; Referee: Messina

3 April 1999 27	Perugia	0–0	Bologna	Perugia
16:00 CEST		Report		Stadium: Renato Curi; Referee: Ceccarini

11 April 1999 28	Juventus	2–2	Bologna	Turin
16:00 CEST	Inzaghi 17'; Di Livo 81'	Report	34' Kolyvanov; 81' Cappioli	Stadium: Delle Alpi; Referee: Bolognino

17 April 1999 29	Bologna	3–0	Fiorentina	Bologna
16:00 CEST	Simutenkov 28'; Bettarini 62'; Kolyvanov 69'	Report		Stadium: Renato Dall'Ara; Referee: Cesari

25 April 1999 30	Salernitana	4–0	Bologna	Salerno
16:00 CEST	Di Vaio 5' (pen.), 16', 68'; Kristic 90'	Report		Stadium: Stadio Arechi; Attendance: 35 000; Referee: Cesari

2 May 1999 31	Bologna	1–3	Cagliari	Bologna
16:00 CEST	Signori 31'	Report	18' O'Neill; 45' Macellari; 46' Mboma	Stadium: Renato Dall'Ara

9 May 1999 32	Lazio	2–0	Bologna	Rome
16:00 CEST	Almeyda 50'; Vieri 89'	Report		Stadium: Olimpico; Referee: Boggi

16 May 1999 33	Bologna	2–2	Sampdoria	Bologna
16:30 CEST	Ingesson 27', 94'	Report	6', 39' Montella	Stadium: Renato Dall'Ara

23 May 1999 34	Inter	3–1	Bologna	Milan
16:30 CEST	Ronaldo 8'; Šimić 87'; Ventola 89'	Report	88' Simutenkov	Stadium: Giuseppe Meazza; Referee: Rodomonti

=== Coppa Italia ===
==== Round of 32 ====
9 September 1998	Reggina	1–1	Bologna	Reggio Calabria
20:30 CET	Lorenzini 46'	Report	39' Simutenkov	Stadium: Oreste Granillo; Attendance: 5,553; Referee: Boggi

23 September 1998	Bologna	3–0	Reggina	Bologna
20:30 CET	Binotto 23'; Fontolan 29'; Simutenkov 53'			Stadium: Renato Dall'Ara; Referee: Preschern

==== Eight-finals ====
28 October 1998	Sampdoria	0–0	Bologna	Genoa
20:30 CET				Stadium: Luigi Ferraris; Referee: Messina

11 November 1998	Bologna	2–1	Sampdoria	Bologna
20:30 CET	Signori 20'; Kolyvanov 44' (pen.)		8' Palmieri	Stadium: Renato Dall'Ara; Referee: Trentalange

==== Quarter-finals ====
13 January 1999	Juventus	1–2	Bologna	Turin
20:30 CET	Perrotta 13'		74' Boselli; 93' (pen.) Ingesson	Stadium: Delle Alpi; Referee: Messina

26 January 1999	Bologna	0–1	Juventus	Bologna
20:30 CET			78' Davids	Stadium: Renato Dall'Ara; Referee: Racalbuto

==== Semi-finals ====
18 February 1999	Bologna	0–2	Fiorentina	Bologna
20:30 CET			32' Esposito; 65' Rui Costa	Stadium: Renato Dall'Ara; Referee: Pellegrino

10 March 1999	Fiorentina	2–2	Bologna	Florence
20:30 CET	Cois 98'; Rui Costa 118'	Report	18', 64' Binotto	Stadium: Artemio Franchi; Attendance: 13,000; Referee: Borriello

===== UEFA Cup qualification =====
27 May 1999	Inter	1–2	Bologna	Milan
	Baggio 59'		7' Andersson; 49' Paramatti	Stadium: Stadio Giuseppe Meazza; Attendance: 62.705; Referee: Boggi

30 May 1999	Bologna	2–1	Inter	Bologna
	Signori 3'; Bettarini 41'		90' Ventola	Stadium: Stadio Renato Dall'Ara; Attendance: 27.000; Referee: Cesari

=== Intertoto Cup ===
==== Third round ====
18 July 1998	Bologna (Italy)	2–0	(Romania) Naţional București	Bologna
	Paramatti 4'; Ingesson 38'	Report		Stadium: Stadio Renato Dall'Ara; Attendance: 10,000; Referee: Sándor Piller (Hungary)

25 July 1998	Naţional București (Romania)	3–1 (3–3a agg.)	(Italy) Bologna	Bucharest
	Pigulea 28', 71'; Pârlog 45'	Report	Kolyvanov 15' (pen.)	Stadium: Stadionul Cotroceni; Attendance: 5,000; Referee: Rémi Harrel (France)

==== Semi-finals ====
29 July 1998	Bologna (Italy)	3–1	(Italy) Sampdoria	Bologna
20:35	Andersson 1'; Paramatti 31'; Kolyvanov 90'	Report	Palmieri 17'	Stadium: Stadio Renato Dall'Ara; Attendance: 8,000; Referee: Juan Fernández Marin (Spain)

5 August 1998	Sampdoria (Italy)	1–0 (2–3 agg.)	(Italy) Bologna	Genoa
20:45	Palmieri 27'	Report UEFA Report 2		Stadium: Stadio Luigi Ferraris; Attendance: 14,000; Referee: Atanas Uzunov (Bulgaria)

==== Finals ====
11 August 1998	Bologna (Italy)	1–0	(Poland) Ruch Chorzów	Bologna
20:45	Kolyvanov 45'	Report		Stadium: Stadio Renato Dall'Ara; Attendance: 5,866; Referee: Hartmut Strampe (Germany)

25 August 1998	Ruch Chorzów (Poland)	0–2 (0–3 agg.)	(Italy) Bologna	Chorzów
16:00		Report	Kolyvanov 60' (pen.); Signori 90'	Stadium: Stadion Ruchu; Attendance: 5,000; Referee: Claude Colombo (France)

=== UEFA Cup ===
==== First round ====
15 September 1998	Sporting CP (Portugal)	0–2	(Italy) Bologna	Lisbon
22:30 (CET)		Report	Nervo 16'; Eriberto 90'	Stadium: Estádio José Alvalade; Attendance: 30,000; Referee: Jan Wegereef (Netherlands)

29 September 1998	Bologna (Italy)	2–1	(Portugal) Sporting CP	Bologna
16:00 (CET)	Nervo 78'; Signori 90'	Report	Leandro Machado 65'	Stadium: Stadio Renato Dall'Ara; Attendance: 5,000; Referee: Eric Romain (Belgium)

Bologna won 4–1 on aggregate.

==== Second round ====
20 October 1998	Bologna (Italy)	2–1	(Czech Republic) Slavia Prague	Bologna
17:00 (CET)	Signori 51'; Ingesson 85'	Report	Dostálek 67'	Stadium: Stadio Renato Dall'Ara; Attendance: 12,000; Referee: Sergei Khusainov (Russia)

3 November 1998	Slavia Prague (Czech Republic)	0–2	(Italy) Bologna	Prague
16:30 (CET)		Report	Signori 80'; Cappioli 85'	Stadium: Stadion Eden; Attendance: 8,827; Referee: Georgios Bikas (Greece)

Bologna won 4–1 on aggregate.

==== Third round ====
24 November 1998	Bologna (Italy)	4–1	(Spain) Real Betis	Bologna
18:30 (CET)	Fontolan 25', 74'; Kolyvanov 52'; Eriberto 59'	Report	Benjamín 63'	Stadium: Stadio Renato Dall'Ara; Attendance: 25,000; Referee: Claus Bo Larsen (Denmark)

8 December 1998	Real Betis (Spain)	1–0	(Italy) Bologna	Seville
19:00 (CET)	Oli 4'	Report		Stadium: Estadio Benito Villamarín; Attendance: 20,000; Referee: Miroslav Radoman (Yugoslavia)

Bologna won 4–2 on aggregate.

==== Quarter-finals ====
2 March 1999	Bologna (Italy)	3–0	(France) Lyon	Bologna
17:30 (CET)	Signori 8', 49'; Binotto 55'	Report		Stadium: Stadio Renato Dall'Ara; Attendance: 19,550; Referee: Paul Durkin (England)

16 March 1999	Lyon (France)	2–0	(Italy) Bologna	Lyon
20:30 (CET)	Caveglia 16'; Job 39'	Report		Stadium: Stade de Gerland; Attendance: 44,000; Referee: Manuel Díaz Vega (Spain)

Bologna won 3–2 on aggregate.

==== Semi-finals ====
6 April 1999	Marseille (France)	0–0	(Italy) Bologna	Marseille
20:45 (CET)		Report		Stadium: Stade Vélodrome; Attendance: 57,300; Referee: Ryszard Wójcik (Poland)

20 April 1999	Bologna (Italy)	1–1	(France) Marseille	Bologna
19:30 (CET)	Paramatti 18'	Report	Blanc 86' (pen.)	Stadium: Stadio Renato Dall'Ara; Attendance: 38,000; Referee: Markus Merk (Germany)

Bologna 1–1 Marseille on aggregate. Marseille won on away goals.

== Statistics ==
=== Players statistics ===
No.	Pos	Nat	Player	Total		1998-99 Serie A	
No.	Pos	Nat	Player	Apps	Goals	Apps	Goals
1	GK	(Italy) ITA	Francesco Antonioli	32	-41	32	-41
23	DF	(Italy) ITA	Alessandro Rinaldi	22	0	18+4	0
2	DF	(Italy) ITA	Giovanni Bia	20	0	19+1	0
24	DF	(Italy) ITA	Amedeo Mangone	28	0	28	0
6	DF	(Italy) ITA	Massimo Tarantino	20	0	20	0
21	MF	(Italy) ITA	Jonatan Binotto	29	3	22+7	3
5	MF	(Italy) ITA	Giancarlo Marocchi	29	0	24+5	0
8	MF	(Sweden) SWE	Klas Ingesson	30	3	28+2	3
18	MF	(Italy) ITA	Davide Fontolan	24	2	18+6	2
10	FW	(Italy) ITA	Giuseppe Signori	28	15	27+1	15
19	FW	(Sweden) SWE	Kennet Andersson	25	6	25	6
22	GK	(Italy) ITA	Alex Brunner	3	-6	2+1	-6
3	DF	(Italy) ITA	Michele Paramatti	16	1	16	1
4	DF	(Italy) ITA	Massimo Paganin	17	0	15+2	0
26	DF	(Italy) ITA	Stefano Bettarini	14	1	13+1	1
30	MF	(Italy) ITA	Giampiero Maini	19	0	13+6	0
7	MF	(Italy) ITA	Carlo Nervo	15	2	13+2	2
9	FW	(Russia) RUS	Igor Kolyvanov	20	6	10+10	6
16	MF	(Italy) ITA	Massimiliano Cappioli	22	1	10+12	1
15	MF	(Brazil) BRA	Eriberto	19	1	6+13	1
13	DF	(Italy) ITA	Nicola Boselli	10	0	6+4	0
31	DF	(Sweden) SWE	Teddy Lučić	8	0	6+2	0
20	FW	(Russia) RUS	Igor Simutenkov	14	3	3+11	3
14	FW	(France) FRA	Christophe Sanchez	3	0	0+3	0
11	MF	(Italy) ITA	Oscar Magoni	2	0	0+2	0
25	GK	(Italy) ITA	Di Leo	0	0	0	0
12	GK	(Italy) ITA	Marco Roccati				
17	FW	(Italy) ITA	Giovanni Pompei				
27	FW	(Italy) ITA	Claudio Gallicchio				
28	FW	(Italy) ITA	Giacomo Cipriani				

- Source: http://calcio-seriea.net/presenze/1998/1149/

== Sources ==
- – RSSSF Italy Championship 1998/99
