= 1997–98 Bologna FC 1909 season =

Bologna
1997–98 season
- Chairman: Giuseppe Gazzoni
- Manager: Renzo Ulivieri
- Stadium: Renato Dall'Ara
- Serie A: 8th (in Intertoto Cup)
- Coppa Italia: Round of 16
- Top goalscorer: League: Roberto Baggio (22); All: Roberto Baggio (23)
Home colours	Away colours	Third colours

During the 1997–98 season Bologna F.C. competed in Serie A and Coppa Italia.

== Summary ==
Bologna Football Club 1909 had a successful season, in which it reached the top half of the standings in Serie A for the second year running. The most notable feature about the Bologna side was the presence of superstar Roberto Baggio, who flourished when getting out of a terrible spell at Milan. He scored 22 out of the teams' 55 goals, before leaving for Inter at the end of the season. Given that fellow strikers Kennet Andersson and Igor Kolyvanov also impressed, Bologna could live with losing Baggio. Other well-performing players included goalkeeper Giorgio Sterchele, defender Michele Paramatti and playmaker Carlo Nervo. On the last day of the season, the team qualified to the 1998 UEFA Intertoto Cup.

== Squad ==
Note: Flags indicate national team as defined under FIFA eligibility rules; some limited exceptions apply. Players may hold more than one non-FIFA nationality.

No.	Pos.	Nation	Player
1	GK	ITA	Francesco Antonioli
2	DF	ITA	Daniele Carnasciali
3	DF	ITA	Michele Paramatti
5	MF	ITA	Giancarlo Marocchi
6	MF	ITA	Paolo Cristallini
8	MF	ITA	Massimo Brambilla
9	FW	RUS	Igor Kolyvanov
10	FW	ITA	Roberto Baggio (Captain)
11	MF	ITA	Oscar Magoni
12	GK	ITA	Andrea Ferrari
13	MF	ITA	Antonio Maschio
14	MF	RUS	Igor Shalimov
16	MF	ITA	Carlo Nervo
17	MF	ITA	Antonio Foschini

No.	Pos.	Nation	Player
18	MF	ITA	Davide Fontolan
19	FW	SWE	Kennet Andersson
20	DF	ITA	Mauro Bonomi
21	DF	ITA	Giovanni Dall'Igna
22	GK	ITA	Alex Brunner
23	DF	ITA	Cristiano Pavone
24	DF	ITA	Amedeo Mangone
25	FW	SLE	Mohamed Kallon
27	DF	ITA	Stefano Torrisi
29	MF	ITA	Giuliano Gentilini
30	DF	ITA	Massimo Paganin
31	GK	ITA	Giorgio Sterchele
33	DF	ITA	Massimo Tarantino
35	MF	URU	Andrés Martínez

=== Transfers ===
In
Pos.	Name	from	Type
FW	Roberto Baggio	AC Milan	€1.80 million
GK	Giorgio Sterchele	AS Roma	loan
DF	Daniele Carnasciali	Fiorentina	–
DF	Massimo Paganin	Inter	–
DF	Massimo Tarantino	Inter	–
MF	Paolo Cristallini	Torino	–
MF	Giuliano Gentilini	Calcio Padova	–
FW	Andrés Martínez	Boca Juniors	–
FW	Mohamed Kallon	Inter	–
DF	Mauro Bonomi	AC Cesena	

Out
Pos.	Name	To	Type
DF	Andrea Tarozzi	Fiorentina	
GK	Francesco Gnudi		–
MF	Massimo Brambilla	Torino	–
MF	Andrea Bergamo	Ravenna FC	–
MF	Marco De Marchi	Vitesse	–
DF	Giuseppe Cardone	AC Milan	–
FW	Pierpaolo Bresciani	Venezia FC	–
MF	Giuseppe Anaclerio	US Avellino	–
MF	Andrea Seno	Calcio Padova	–
MF	Marco Schenardi	Vicenza Calcio	–
DF	Mauro Bonomi	Torino	

== Competitions ==
=== Serie A ===
==== League table ====
Pos	Team	Pld	W	D	L	GF	GA	GD	Pts	Qualification or relegation
6	Parma	34	15	12	7	55	39	+16	57	Qualification to UEFA Cup
7	Lazio	34	16	8	10	53	30	+23	56	Qualification to Cup Winners' Cup
8	Bologna	34	12	12	10	55	46	+9	48 (Note: Bologna finished ahead of Sampdoria on head-to-head points: BOL 2–2 SAM; SAM 2–3 BOL.)	Qualification to Intertoto Cup third round
9	Sampdoria	34	13	9	12	52	55	−3	48	Qualification to Intertoto Cup second round
10	Milan	34	11	11	12	37	43	−6	44	

Source: 1997–98 Serie A, RSSSF.com, Soccerway
Rules for classification: 1) Points; 2) Head-to-head points; 3) Head-to-head goal difference; 4) Goal difference; 5) Goals scored; 6) Draw. (Note: Head-to-head record is used only after all the matches between the teams in question have been played).

==== Results by round ====
Round	1	2	3	4	5	6	7	8	9	10	11	12	13	14	15	16	17	18	19	20	21	22	23	24	25	26	27	28	29	30	31	32	33	34
Ground	A	H	A	H	A	A	H	A	H	H	A	H	A	H	A	H	A	H	A	H	A	H	H	A	H	A	A	H	A	H	A	H	A	H
Result	L	L	D	D	D	L	W	L	D	D	L	W	D	W	D	L	L	D	W	W	L	W	L	D	W	D	W	W	D	W	W	D	L	W
Position	11	15	14	14	16	16	15	15	15	16	17	13	13	11	11	13	14	13	12	10	10	10	10	11	10	10	10	9	10	10	9	9	9	8

Source: Competitive matches
A = Away; H = Home; W = Win; D = Draw; L = Loss; = Leader, UEFA Champions League Groups stage; = UEFA Champions League Qualifying round; = 1998–99 UEFA Cup; = 1998 UEFA Intertoto Cup; = 1998–99 Serie B

==== Matches ====
Win Draw Loss

31 August 1997 1	Atalanta	4–2	Bologna	Bergamo
	Caccia 27' (pen.); Orlando 48'; Sgrò 79'; Lucarelli 93'	Report	Andersson 85'; R. Baggio 90' (pen.)	Stadium: Stadio Atleti Azzurri d'Italia

14 September 1997 2	Bologna	2–4	Inter	Bologna
	Baggio 45'; Baggio 58' (pen.)	Report	Galante 12'; Ganz 38'; Ronaldo 52'; Djorkaeff 66'	Stadium: Stadio Renato Dall'Ara

21 September 1997 3	Bari	0–0	Bologna	Bari
		Report		Stadium: Stadio San Nicola

28 September 1997 4	Bologna	0–0	Roma	Bologna
		Report		Stadium: Stadio Renato Dall'Ara

5 October 1997 5	Piacenza	0–0	Bologna	Piacenza
		Report		Stadium: Stadio Leonardo Garilli

19 October 1997 6	Parma	2–0	Bologna	Parma
	Chiesa 36'; D. Baggio 47'	Report		Stadium: Stadio Ennio Tardini

2 November 1997 7	Bologna	5–1	Napoli	Bologna
	Baggio 48' (pen.); Baggio 90'; Baggio 95' (pen.); Andersson 55'; Andersson 93'	Report	Goretti 14'	Stadium: Stadio Renato Dall'Ara

9 November 1997 8	Vicenza	3–2	Bologna	Vicenza
	Di Carlo 9'; Otero 64'; Schenardi 85'	Report	Marocchi 35'; Baggio 56'	Stadium: Stadio Romeo Menti

23 November 1997 9	Bologna	2–2	Fiorentina	Bologna
	Andersson 35'; Paramatti 73'	Report	Oliveira 30'; Batistuta 85'	Stadium: Stadio Renato Dall'Ara

30 November 1997 10	Bologna	2–2	Sampdoria	Bologna
	Baggio 15' (pen.); Paramatti 48'	Report	Laigle 57'; Klinsmann 76'	Stadium: Stadio Renato Dall'Ara

7 December 1997 11	Udinese	4–3	Bologna	Udine
	Bierhoff 13', 81'; Amoroso 36'; Poggi 67'	Report	Andersson 27'; Nervo 42'; Kolyvanov 85'	Stadium: Stadio Friuli

14 December 1997 12	Bologna	2–0	Lecce	Bologna
	Cristallini 20'; Kolyvanov 87'	Report		Stadium: Stadio Renato Dall'Ara

21 December 1997 13	Milan	0–0	Bologna	Milan
		Report		Stadium: San Siro

4 January 1998 14	Bologna	2–1	Brescia	Bologna
	Baggio 26', 90+6' (pen.)	Report	Marocchi 80' (o.g.)	Stadium: Stadio Renato Dall'Ara

11 January 1998 15	Empoli	0–0	Bologna	Empoli
		Report		Stadium: Stadio Carlo Castellani

18 January 1998 16	Bologna	1–3	Juventus	Bologna
	Kolyvanov 90+3'	Report	Inzaghi 10', 20'; Del Piero 60'	Stadium: Stadio Renato Dall'Ara

25 January 1998 17	Lazio	1–0	Bologna	Rome
	Nedvěd 43'	Report		Stadium: Stadio Olimpico

1 February 1998 18	Bologna	0–0	Atalanta	Bologna
		Report		Stadium: Stadio Renato Dall'Ara

8 February 1998 19	Inter	0–1	Bologna	Milan
		Report	Paramatti 56'	Stadium: San Siro

11 February 1998 20	Bologna	4–3	Bari	Bologna
	Kolyvanov 17', 82'; Baggio 36' (pen.), 78'	Report	Mangone 41' (o.g.); Volpi 59'; Bressan 90'	Stadium: Stadio Renato Dall'Ara

15 February 1998 21	Roma	2–1	Bologna	Rome
	Di Francesco 5'; Delvecchio 87'	Report	Kolyvanov 9'	Stadium: Stadio Olimpico

22 February 1998 22	Bologna	3–0	Piacenza	Bologna
	Andersson 34', 51'; Baggio 87'	Report		Stadium: Stadio Renato Dall'Ara

1 March 1998 23	Bologna	1–2	Parma	Bologna
	Paramatti 11'	Report	Stanić 15'; Crippa 28'	Stadium: Stadio Renato Dall'Ara

8 March 1998 24	Napoli	0–0	Bologna	Naples
		Report		Stadium: Stadio San Paolo

14 March 1998 25	Bologna	3–1	Vicenza	Bologna
	Andersson 18', 45+1'; Kolyvanov 39'	Report	Zauli 33'	Stadium: Stadio Renato Dall'Ara

22 March 1998 26	Fiorentina	1–1	Bologna	Florence
	Oliveira 36' (pen.)	Report	Baggio 40' (pen.)	Stadium: Stadio Artemio Franchi

29 March 1998 27	Sampdoria	2–3	Bologna	Genoa
	Montella 14'; Verón 49'	Report	Andersson 55', 69', 82'	Stadium: Stadio Luigi Ferraris

5 April 1998 28	Bologna	2–0	Udinese	Bologna
	Shalimov 1'; Kolyvanov 4' (pen.)	Report		Stadium: Stadio Renato Dall'Ara

11 April 1998 29	Lecce	1–1	Bologna	Lecce
	Atelkin 66'	Report	Fontolan 75'	Stadium: Stadio Via del Mare

19 April 1998 30	Bologna	3–0	Milan	Bologna
	Baggio 15', 45+5' (pen.); Fontolan 83'	Report		Stadium: Stadio Renato Dall'Ara

26 April 1998 31	Brescia	1–3	Bologna	Brescia
	Pirlo 79'	Report	Baggio 39', 62'; Paganin 90'	Stadium: Stadio Mario Rigamonti

3 May 1998 32	Bologna	2–2	Empoli	Bologna
	Baggio 14' (pen.); Paramatti 17'	Report	Esposito 42'; Cappellini 90+4' (pen.)	Stadium: Stadio Renato Dall'Ara

10 May 1998 33	Juventus	3–2	Bologna	Turin
	Inzaghi 34', 50', 81'	Report	Kolyvanov 11'; Baggio 56'	Stadium: Stadio delle Alpi

16 May 1998 34	Bologna	2–1	Lazio	Bologna
	Baggio 40' (pen.), 70'	Report	Fuser 50'	Stadium: Stadio Renato Dall'Ara

=== Coppa Italia ===
==== Eightfinals ====
15 October 1997 1	Atalanta B.C.	3–1	Bologna	Bergamo
16:00 CEST	Sgrò 22', 33' (pen.); Dunđerski 28'		95' (pen.) Shalimov	Stadium: Atleti Azzurri d'Italia; Attendance: 6,000; Referee: Gennaro Borriello

19 November 1997 2	Bologna	3–1 (a.e.t.) (1–3 p)	Atalanta B.C.	Bologna
20:30 CET	Fontolan 17', 39'; Kolyvanov 47'		45' Caccia	Stadium: Stadio Renato Dall'Ara; Attendance: 12,000; Referee: Pierluigi Pairetto
	Penalties
	Torrisi (penalty missed); Baggio (penalty scored); Paramatti (penalty missed); Kallon (penalty missed)		(penalty missed) Sgrò; (penalty scored) Gallo; (penalty scored) Lucarelli; (penalty scored) Dunđerski

== Statistics ==
=== Players statistics ===
No.	Pos	Nat	Player	Total		Serie A		Coppa	
No.	Pos	Nat	Player	Apps	Goals	Apps	Goals	Apps	Goals
31	GK	(Italy) ITA	Giorgio Sterchele	33	-40	32	-38	1	-2
3	DF	(Italy) ITA	Michele Paramatti	31	5	28	5	3	0
24	DF	(Italy) ITA	Amedeo Mangone	35	0	30+2	0	3	0
27	DF	(Italy) ITA	Stefano Torrisi	27	0	23+1	0	3	0
30	DF	(Italy) ITA	Massimo Paganin	33	1	28+3	1	2	0
16	MF	(Italy) ITA	Carlo Nervo	35	1	27+6	1	2	0
11	MF	(Italy) ITA	Oscar Magoni	35	0	30+2	0	3	0
5	MF	(Italy) ITA	Giancarlo Marocchi	34	1	31	1	3	0
9	FW	(Russia) RUS	Igor Kolyvanov	34	11	25+6	9	3	2
10	FW	(Italy) ITA	Roberto Baggio	33	23	27+3	22	3	1
19	FW	(Sweden) SWE	Kennet Andersson	33	12	31+1	12	1	0
22	GK	(Italy) ITA	Alex Brunner	6	-12	2	-8	4	-4
33	DF	(Italy) ITA	Massimo Tarantino	22	0	20+1	0	1	0
6	MF	(Italy) ITA	Paolo Cristallini	21	1	16+3	1	2	0
2	DF	(Italy) ITA	Daniele Carnasciali	18	1	12+4	0	2	1
18	MF	(Italy) ITA	Davide Fontolan	30	4	6+21	2	3	2
14	MF	(Russia) RUS	Igor Shalimov	17	3	4+11	1	2	2
23	DF	(Italy) ITA	Cristiano Pavone	18	0	2+14	0	2	0
	MF	(Italy) ITA	Massimo Brambilla	4	0	0+2	0	2	0
17	MF	(Italy) ITA	Antonio Foschini	1	0	0	0	1	0
29	MF	(Italy) ITA	Giuliano Gentilini	5	0	0+3	0	2	0
35	MF	(Uruguay) URU	Andres Martínez	1	0	0+1	0		
20	MF	(Italy) ITA	Mauro Bonomi	2	0	0+1	0	1	0
25	FW	(Sierra Leone) SLE	Mohamed Kallon	6	2	0+2	0	4	2
21	FW	(Italy) ITA	Dall'Igna	3	0	0+2	0	1	0
12	GK	(Italy) ITA	Ferrari	2	0	0+2	0		
	MF	(Italy) ITA	Seno	2	0	0+2	0		
	FW	(Italy) ITA	Pierpaolo Bresciani	1	0	0	0	1	0
13	DF	(Italy) ITA	Maschio	1	0	0	0	1	0
1	GK	(Italy) ITA	Francesco Antonioli						

- Source: http://calcio-seriea.net/presenze/1997/1125/
