= Marco Ambrosio =

Italian footballer (born 1973)

Personal information
- Date of birth: 30 May 1973 (age 53)
- Place of birth: Brescia, Italy
- Height: 1.87 m (6 ft 2 in)
- Position: Goalkeeper

Senior career*
Years	Team	Apps	(Gls)
1991–1992	Lumezzane	2	(0)
1992–1993	Atalanta	0	(0)
1993–1994	→ Pisa (loan)	9	(0)
1994–1995	Prato (co-ownership)	15	(0)
1995–1996	→ Ravenna (loan)	10	(0)
1996–1997	Prato	34	(0)
1997–1999	Sampdoria	10	(0)
1999–2001	Lucchese	46	(0)
2001–2003	Chievo	10	(0)
2003–2004	Chelsea	8	(0)
2004	Grasshoppers	14	(0)
2005–2006	Salernitana	55	(0)
2006–2007	Brescia	2	(0)
2007–2009	Reggiana	56	(0)
2009	FeralpiSalò	17	(0)
Total		288	(0)

International career
1993–1994	Italy U21	2	(0)
- * Club domestic league appearances and goals

Marco Ambrosio (30 May 1973) is an Italian former professional footballer who played as a goalkeeper. Ambrosio played for multiple teams in the Italian leagues from 1991 until his retirement in 2009 (most notably with Serie A sides Atalanta, Sampdoria and Chievo), but also had brief spells in England with Chelsea, and in Switzerland with Grasshoppers. He made two appearances for his country's under-21 side during the 1993–94 season, but never made an appearance for the full national side.

== Career ==
=== A decade in Italy ===
Ambrosio was born in Brescia. The early years of his career were relatively undistinguished, and saw him play for a succession of minor Italian clubs, such as Lumezzane (Serie D), Atalanta B.C. (youth), Pisa (Serie B), A.C. Prato (Serie C1) and Ravenna (Serie C1). Whilst playing for Pisa, he made two appearances for Italy's under-21 team. He also had a stint with U.C. Sampdoria in Serie A. He made his Serie A debut on 2 November 1997, Sampdoria lost 3–0 at home to A.C. Milan. In total, he played 10 Serie A games for the Genoese team, as second goalkeeper behind Fabrizio Ferron.

After Sampdoria were relegated to Serie B, Ambrosio was sold to Serie C1 team Lucchese in the summer of 1999, where he spent two seasons. In summer 2001 he was signed by newly promoted Serie A team Chievo, where he made another 10 Serie A appearances as second-choice goalkeeper behind Cristiano Lupatelli.

=== Chelsea ===
In June 2003 he was signed for Chelsea on a free transfer by Italian manager Claudio Ranieri.

Ambrosio was signed to be goalkeeping understudy to Carlo Cudicini alongside fellow new-acquisition Jürgen Macho, and so found his playing opportunities limited at Stamford Bridge. Shortly after joining the club Macho picked up a serious knee injury and Chelsea subsequently signed Neil Sullivan, meaning Ambrosio would now compete with Sullivan while providing back up to Cudicini. His cause was not helped by an unlucky debut in the League Cup against Notts County, in which he made a series of errors. His second appearance, against Bolton Wanderers, proved far more assured as he made a string of impressive saves to secure a crucial 2–0 win for his side. That, together with injuries to all Chelsea's other goalkeepers, earned him a run in the side. His most significant contribution came in the Champions League quarter-final against Arsenal when his saves helped Chelsea to a 2–1 victory at Highbury.

However, he lost his place in the side to the fit-again Cudicini towards the end of the season and with the signing of another new goalkeeper Petr Čech, he was allowed to leave the club on a free transfer in August 2004.

=== Spell in Switzerland and return to Italy ===
Ambrosio moved to Swiss side Grasshopper Club Zürich shortly after leaving Chelsea. He later signed for Italian team Salernitana of Serie B on 5 January 2005, replacing Alex Brunner, who left for Cagliari Calcio, and competed with former starter Domenico Botticella.

Ambrosio remained with the team as they were relegated to Serie C1 and competed with former Chievo teammate Gioacchino Cavaliere for a starting spot.

On 21 July 2006, he was signed by Brescia.

In summer 2007, he joined Reggiana of Serie C2.

In September 2009, he signed with FeralpiSalò. Later that year, Ambrosio retired from football.
