= Alex Pederzoli =

Italian footballer (born 1984)

Personal information
- Date of birth: 6 March 1984 (age 42)
- Place of birth: Piacenza, Italy
- Height: 1.73 m (5 ft 8 in)
- Position: Central midfielder

Youth career
- 1999–2000: Bologna
- 2000–2003: Juventus

Senior career*
Years	Team	Apps	(Gls)
2003–2004	Como	6	(0)
2004	→ Rimini (loan)	2	(0)
2004–2007	Juventus	0	(0)
2004–2005	→ Reggiana (loan)	11	(0)
2005	→ Lucchese (loan)	15	(0)
2005–2006	→ Sassari Torres (loan)	12	(1)
2006	→ Pro Sesto (loan)	7	(0)
2006–2007	→ Pistoiese (loan)	9	(0)
2007	→ Manfredonia (loan)	13	(2)
2007–2008	Crotone	31	(2)
2008–2009	Padova	28	(1)
2009–2010	Gallipoli	35	(2)
2010–2012	Ascoli	65	(0)
2013–2014	Südtirol	22	(3)
2014–2015	Pavia	27	(3)
2015–2016	Pordenone	28	(5)
2016–2018	Venezia	18	(3)
2017–2018	→ Piacenza (loan)	11	(3)

International career
2000	Italy U16	9	(1)
2000–2001	Italy U17	12	(1)
2002	Italy U18	5	(0)
2003	Italy U19	1	(0)
2004	Italy U20	3	(0)
- * Club domestic league appearances and goals

Alex Pederzoli (born 6 March 1984) is a former Italian footballer who played as a midfielder.

== Club career ==
=== Youth career ===
Born in Piacenza, Emilia–Romagna, Pederzoli started his career with Emilia–Romagna side Bologna. In mid-2000, Juventus signed Pederzoli (€516,457 or 1 billion lire), Giacomo Cipriani (€2.324M for 50% rights or 4.5 billion lire), Alessandro Gamberini (€2.324M for 50%rights or 4.5 billion lire) from Bologna and sold the remaining 50% registration rights of Jonatan Binotto to Bologna for 10 (short) billion Lire (€5.16 million), which the Emilia–Romagna club also retained 50% registration rights of Gamberini and Pederzoli.

In June 2002, Bologna bought back Gamberini for free and Pederzoli to Juventus for about €260,000. It made Juventus received a financial income of €257 thousands for Pederzoli, a disposals loss of €1.502 million and financial income of €2.324 million for Gamberini.

=== Juve, Como & Serie C1 ===
In mid-2003, he was sold to Serie B side Como in a co-ownership deal, along with Felice Piccolo (for a total fee of €1.6 million alleged by FIGC or €20,000 in Juventus financial report), made Juventus losses €393 thousand and €39 thousand respectively. Como finished as the bottom at the end of season, and Pederzoli was loaned to Serie C1 side Rimini. In June 2004, Juventus bought back both players for a nominal fee of €10,000 each and their registration rights now only €20,000 each in Juventus's account, signed a 3-year contract.

Both players were then farmed out again, and Pederzoli joined Serie C1 club Reggiana, often as a substitute. In mid-season he left for Lucchese from Serie C1/B (i.e. Group B) to Serie C/A (i.e. Group A).

In 2005–06 season, Pederzoli remained in Serie C1/B but for Sassari Torres along with Andrea Luci and Giovanni Bartolucci, made Juventus gained €20 thousands, €30 thousands and €15 thousands respectively from the loan. However, Pederzoli was sent to Serie C1/A side Pro Sesto in mid-season. Pro Sesto lost relegation playoffs that season and re-admitted; Sassari Torres entered the promotion playoffs but went bankrupt and relegated.

In mid-2006, the liquidator of Como Calcio 1907 (which went bankrupt in 2005, 2 years after Enrico Preziosi sold the team) claimed Juventus still had to pay the company €1,580,000 for the fees to bought Pederzoli and Piccolo back (as the price dropped from €1.6 million to €20,000 but in 2004 Juve acquired youth players Criscito and Volpe for €1.9million from Genoa, Preziosi's new club), but Juventus said the sum already paid and started a legal defense, but still budgeted that sum in the balance sheet few years later for ongoing legal process.

In the last year of his contract, Pederzoli at first left for Pistoiese of Serie C1/A. After a limited chance, he left for Serie C1/B side Manfredonia. Both teams finished in mid-table.

At the start of season, Pederzoli was signed by Serie C1/A side Venezia but on 31 August 2007 left for Serie C1/B Crotone. Pederzoli made a break through that season, played 31 league matches with the same club and played additional 2 with the club in playoffs, in although lost to Taranto in the first round (semi-final).

At the start of season he signed a 2-year contract with Lega Pro Prima Divisione/A (ex-Serie C1/A) side Padova. He followed the team entered into the promotion playoff, this time won Pro Patria in the final.

=== Serie B ===
Pederzoli was signed by Serie B newcomer Gallipoli in August 2009, the club at that time recently invested by businessmen from Udine. Before the investment, the team did not hire enough first team member and was forced to fill youth team players for the Coppa Italia opening match. Gallipoli finished as the 21st, just ahead Salernitana. After the season (formally on 16 July) Gallipoli was expelled from professional league due to its financial record, the club went bankrupt and all players were released.

In July 2010, he signed a 3-year contract with Serie B side Ascoli. He made his debut in the opening match of the season (and the first match in 2010–11 Coppa Italia). He partnered with Daniele Di Donato as the defensive midfielders in the "4–2–3–1" formation, which won Lumezzane 3–1 on 15 August.

=== 2011 Italian football scandal ===
On 31 May 2012 Pederzoli was suspended for 1 year and 4 months due to involvement in 2011–12 Italian football scandal.

=== Return to Serie C ===
On 18 September 2013 he was signed by South Tyrol in a 2-year contract.

On 19 July 2014 he was signed by Pavia.

On 26 August 2015 Pederzoli was signed by Pordenone on a 3-year contract.

In the summer of 2016 he moved to Venezia. On 28 July 2017, Pederzoli moved to Piacenza on a temporary deal. It was reported that the loan deal was terminated in January 2018, as well as Pederzoli leaving Venice in the same month.

== International career ==
Pederzoli was capped for the Italy under-16 side at the 2001 UEFA European Under-16 Football Championship, losing out to eventual champions Spain in the quarter-finals of the competition. In that match, he was replaced by Paolo Facchinetti in the 35th minute. He partnered with Gabriele Perico, Francesco Lodi and Alessandro Moro in the team's midfield, while playmaker Alberto Aquilani played as a defender at the time. During the match, the Italian coach fielded five defenders (with Giorgio Chiellini serving as a wing-back) and only one striker. Italy lost 3–4 in a penalty shootout.
