= UEFA Euro 2008 squads =

The following is a list of squads for each nation competing at UEFA Euro 2008 in Austria and Switzerland. The tournament started on 7 June and the final took place in Vienna on 29 June 2008.

Each national team had to submit a squad of 23 players, three of whom had to be goalkeepers, by 28 May 2008. If a player was injured severely enough to prevent his participation in the tournament before his team's first match, he could be replaced by another player.

All caps, goals, ages, and clubs of players are correct as of 7 June 2008, the first day of the tournament.

== Group A ==
=== Czech Republic ===
Manager: Karel Brückner

No.	Pos.	Player	Date of birth (age)	Caps	Goals	Club
1	GK	Petr Čech	20 May 1982 (aged 26)	59	0	(The Football Association) Chelsea
2	DF	Zdeněk Grygera	14 May 1980 (aged 28)	53	2	(Italian Football Federation) Juventus
3	MF	Jan Polák	14 March 1981 (aged 27)	38	6	(Royal Belgian Football Association) Anderlecht
4	MF	Tomáš Galásek	15 January 1973 (aged 35)	66	1	(German Football Association) 1. FC Nürnberg
5	DF	Radoslav Kováč	27 November 1979 (aged 28)	23	1	(Russian Football Union) Spartak Moscow
6	DF	Marek Jankulovski	9 May 1977 (aged 31)	64	10	(Italian Football Federation) Milan
7	MF	Libor Sionko	1 February 1977 (aged 31)	30	6	(Danish Football Association) Copenhagen
8	FW	Martin Fenin	16 April 1987 (aged 21)	5	0	(German Football Association) Eintracht Frankfurt
9	FW	Jan Koller	30 March 1973 (aged 35)	87	54	(German Football Association) 1. FC Nürnberg
10	FW	Václav Svěrkoš	1 November 1983 (aged 24)	2	0	(Football Association of the Czech Republic) Baník Ostrava
11	FW	Stanislav Vlček	26 February 1976 (aged 32)	10	0	(Royal Belgian Football Association) Anderlecht
12	DF	Zdeněk Pospěch	14 December 1978 (aged 29)	8	0	(Danish Football Association) Copenhagen
13	DF	Michal Kadlec	13 December 1984 (aged 23)	6	1	(Football Association of the Czech Republic) Sparta Prague
14	MF	David Jarolím	17 May 1979 (aged 29)	16	1	(German Football Association) Hamburger SV
15	FW	Milan Baroš	28 October 1981 (aged 26)	64	31	(French Football Federation) Lyon (Note: Baroš was on loan to Portsmouth.)
16	GK	Jaromír Blažek	29 December 1972 (aged 35)	14	0	(German Football Association) 1. FC Nürnberg
17	MF	Marek Matějovský	20 December 1981 (aged 26)	10	1	(The Football Association) Reading
18	MF	Tomáš Sivok	15 September 1983 (aged 24)	6	0	(Italian Football Federation) Udinese (Note: Sivok was on loan to Sparta Prague and joined Beşiktaş after the tournament.)
19	MF	Rudolf Skácel	17 July 1979 (aged 28)	5	1	(The Football Association) Southampton (Note: Skácel was on loan to Hertha BSC.)
20	MF	Jaroslav Plašil	5 January 1982 (aged 26)	37	2	(Royal Spanish Football Federation) Osasuna
21	DF	Tomáš Ujfaluši (captain)	24 March 1978 (aged 30)	68	2	(Italian Football Federation) Fiorentina (Note: Ujfaluši joined Atlético Madrid after the tournament.)
22	DF	David Rozehnal	5 July 1980 (aged 27)	45	0	(The Football Association) Newcastle United (Note: Rozehnal was on loan to Lazio.)
23	GK	Daniel Zítka	20 June 1975 (aged 32)	1	0	(Royal Belgian Football Association) Anderlecht

=== Portugal ===
Manager: (Brazil) Luiz Felipe Scolari

Quim injured a wrist on 6 June and was replaced by Nuno.

No.	Pos.	Player	Date of birth (age)	Caps	Goals	Club
1	GK	Ricardo	11 February 1976 (aged 32)	75	0	(Royal Spanish Football Federation) Real Betis
2	DF	Paulo Ferreira	18 January 1979 (aged 29)	47	0	(The Football Association) Chelsea
3	DF	Bruno Alves	27 November 1981 (aged 26)	11	1	(Portuguese Football Federation) Porto
4	DF	José Bosingwa	24 August 1982 (aged 25)	8	0	(Portuguese Football Federation) Porto (Note: Bosingwa joined Chelsea after the tournament.)
5	DF	Fernando Meira	5 June 1978 (aged 30)	49	2	(German Football Association) VfB Stuttgart (Note: Meira joined Galatasaray after the tournament.)
6	MF	Raul Meireles	17 March 1983 (aged 25)	9	0	(Portuguese Football Federation) Porto
7	FW	Cristiano Ronaldo	5 February 1985 (aged 23)	55	20	(The Football Association) Manchester United
8	MF	Petit	25 September 1976 (aged 31)	54	4	(Portuguese Football Federation) Benfica
9	FW	Hugo Almeida	23 May 1984 (aged 24)	9	2	(German Football Association) Werder Bremen
10	MF	João Moutinho	9 September 1986 (aged 21)	13	1	(Portuguese Football Federation) Sporting CP
11	FW	Simão	31 October 1979 (aged 28)	61	15	(Royal Spanish Football Federation) Atlético Madrid
12	GK	Nuno	25 January 1974 (aged 34)	0	0	(Portuguese Football Federation) Porto
13	DF	Miguel	4 January 1980 (aged 28)	47	1	(Royal Spanish Football Federation) Valencia
14	DF	Jorge Ribeiro	9 November 1981 (aged 26)	8	0	(Portuguese Football Federation) Boavista (Note: Ribeiro joined Benfica after the tournament.)
15	DF	Pepe	26 February 1983 (aged 25)	3	0	(Royal Spanish Football Federation) Real Madrid
16	DF	Ricardo Carvalho	18 May 1978 (aged 30)	43	4	(The Football Association) Chelsea
17	FW	Ricardo Quaresma	26 September 1983 (aged 24)	21	2	(Portuguese Football Federation) Porto
18	MF	Miguel Veloso	11 May 1986 (aged 22)	6	0	(Portuguese Football Federation) Sporting CP
19	FW	Nani	17 November 1986 (aged 21)	13	2	(The Football Association) Manchester United
20	MF	Deco	27 August 1977 (aged 30)	53	3	(Royal Spanish Football Federation) Barcelona
21	FW	Nuno Gomes (captain)	5 July 1976 (aged 31)	69	28	(Portuguese Football Federation) Benfica
22	GK	Rui Patrício	15 February 1988 (aged 20)	0	0	(Portuguese Football Federation) Sporting CP
23	FW	Hélder Postiga	2 August 1982 (aged 25)	32	10	(Portuguese Football Federation) Porto (Note: Postiga was on loan to Panathinaikos and joined Sporting CP after the tournament.)

=== Switzerland ===
Manager: Köbi Kuhn

No.	Pos.	Player	Date of birth (age)	Caps	Goals	Club
1	GK	Diego Benaglio	8 September 1983 (aged 24)	12	0	(German Football Association) VfL Wolfsburg
2	DF	Johan Djourou	21 January 1987 (aged 21)	17	1	(The Football Association) Arsenal
3	DF	Ludovic Magnin	20 April 1979 (aged 29)	50	3	(German Football Association) VfB Stuttgart
4	DF	Philippe Senderos	14 February 1985 (aged 23)	28	3	(The Football Association) Arsenal
5	DF	Stephan Lichtsteiner	16 January 1984 (aged 24)	12	0	(French Football Federation) Lille
6	MF	Benjamin Huggel	7 July 1977 (aged 30)	25	0	(Swiss Football Association) Basel
7	MF	Ricardo Cabanas	29 April 1979 (aged 29)	49	4	(Swiss Football Association) Grasshopper
8	MF	Gökhan Inler	27 June 1984 (aged 23)	17	1	(Italian Football Federation) Udinese
9	FW	Alexander Frei (captain)	15 July 1979 (aged 28)	59	35	(German Football Association) Borussia Dortmund
10	MF	Hakan Yakin	22 February 1977 (aged 31)	66	15	(Swiss Football Association) Young Boys
11	FW	Marco Streller	26 June 1981 (aged 26)	28	11	(Swiss Football Association) Basel
12	FW	Eren Derdiyok	12 June 1988 (aged 19)	3	1	(Swiss Football Association) Basel
13	DF	Stéphane Grichting	30 March 1979 (aged 29)	18	0	(French Football Federation) Auxerre
14	MF	Daniel Gygax	28 August 1981 (aged 26)	34	5	(French Football Federation) Metz
15	MF	Gélson Fernandes	2 September 1986 (aged 21)	8	0	(The Football Association) Manchester City
16	MF	Tranquillo Barnetta	22 May 1985 (aged 23)	32	6	(German Football Association) Bayer Leverkusen
17	DF	Christoph Spycher	30 March 1978 (aged 30)	39	0	(German Football Association) Eintracht Frankfurt
18	GK	Pascal Zuberbühler	8 January 1971 (aged 37)	50	0	(Swiss Football Association) Neuchâtel Xamax
19	MF	Valon Behrami	19 April 1985 (aged 23)	16	2	(Italian Football Federation) Lazio
20	DF	Patrick Müller	17 December 1976 (aged 31)	78	3	(French Football Federation) Lyon
21	GK	Eldin Jakupović	2 October 1984 (aged 23)	0	0	(Russian Football Union) Lokomotiv Moscow (Note: Jakupović was on loan to Grasshopper.)
22	FW	Johan Vonlanthen	1 February 1986 (aged 22)	30	6	(Austrian Football Association) Red Bull Salzburg
23	FW	Philipp Degen	15 February 1983 (aged 25)	30	0	(German Football Association) Borussia Dortmund

=== Turkey ===
Manager: Fatih Terim

No.	Pos.	Player	Date of birth (age)	Caps	Goals	Club
1	GK	Rüştü Reçber	10 May 1973 (aged 35)	116	0	(Turkish Football Federation) Beşiktaş
2	DF	Servet Çetin	17 March 1981 (aged 27)	29	1	(Turkish Football Federation) Galatasaray
3	DF	Hakan Balta	23 March 1983 (aged 25)	8	1	(Turkish Football Federation) Galatasaray
4	DF	Gökhan Zan	7 September 1981 (aged 26)	19	0	(Turkish Football Federation) Beşiktaş
5	MF	Emre Belözoğlu (captain)	7 September 1980 (aged 27)	56	4	(The Football Association) Newcastle United
6	MF	Mehmet Topal	3 March 1986 (aged 22)	5	0	(Turkish Football Federation) Galatasaray
7	MF	Mehmet Aurélio	15 December 1977 (aged 30)	19	1	(Turkish Football Federation) Fenerbahçe
8	FW	Nihat Kahveci	23 November 1979 (aged 28)	54	15	(Royal Spanish Football Federation) Villarreal
9	FW	Semih Şentürk	29 April 1983 (aged 25)	4	1	(Turkish Football Federation) Fenerbahçe
10	MF	Gökdeniz Karadeniz	11 January 1980 (aged 28)	46	6	(Russian Football Union) Rubin Kazan
11	MF	Tümer Metin	14 October 1974 (aged 33)	23	7	(Turkish Football Federation) Fenerbahçe (Note: Metin was on loan to AEL for the second half of the 2007–08 season.)
12	GK	Tolga Zengin	10 October 1983 (aged 24)	2	0	(Turkish Football Federation) Trabzonspor
13	DF	Emre Güngör	1 August 1984 (aged 23)	1	0	(Turkish Football Federation) Galatasaray
14	MF	Arda Turan	30 January 1987 (aged 21)	18	1	(Turkish Football Federation) Galatasaray
15	DF	Emre Aşık	13 December 1973 (aged 34)	27	2	(Turkish Football Federation) Galatasaray (Note: Aşık was on loan to Ankaraspor.)
16	DF	Uğur Boral	14 April 1982 (aged 26)	8	0	(Turkish Football Federation) Fenerbahçe
17	FW	Tuncay Şanlı	16 January 1982 (aged 26)	54	15	(The Football Association) Middlesbrough
18	FW	Colin Kazim-Richards	26 August 1986 (aged 21)	2	0	(Turkish Football Federation) Fenerbahçe
19	MF	Ayhan Akman	23 February 1977 (aged 31)	10	1	(Turkish Football Federation) Galatasaray
20	DF	Sabri Sarıoğlu	26 July 1984 (aged 23)	13	1	(Turkish Football Federation) Galatasaray
21	FW	Mevlüt Erdinç	25 February 1987 (aged 21)	4	0	(French Football Federation) Sochaux
22	MF	Hamit Altıntop	8 December 1982 (aged 25)	42	2	(German Football Association) Bayern Munich
23	GK	Volkan Demirel	27 October 1981 (aged 26)	21	0	(Turkish Football Federation) Fenerbahçe

== Group B ==
=== Austria ===
Manager: Josef Hickersberger

No.	Pos.	Player	Date of birth (age)	Caps	Goals	Club
1	GK	Alex Manninger	4 June 1977 (aged 31)	27	0	(Italian Football Federation) Siena
2	MF	Joachim Standfest	30 May 1980 (aged 28)	30	2	(Austrian Football Association) Austria Wien
3	DF	Martin Stranzl	16 June 1980 (aged 27)	45	2	(Russian Football Union) Spartak Moscow
4	DF	Emanuel Pogatetz	16 January 1983 (aged 25)	27	1	(The Football Association) Middlesbrough
5	DF	Christian Fuchs	7 April 1986 (aged 22)	17	0	(Austrian Football Association) Mattersburg
6	MF	René Aufhauser	21 June 1976 (aged 31)	51	11	(Austrian Football Association) Red Bull Salzburg
7	MF	Ivica Vastić	29 September 1969 (aged 38)	48	13	(Austrian Football Association) LASK
8	MF	Christoph Leitgeb	14 April 1985 (aged 23)	19	0	(Austrian Football Association) Red Bull Salzburg
9	FW	Roland Linz	9 August 1981 (aged 26)	32	7	(Portuguese Football Federation) Braga
10	MF	Andreas Ivanschitz (captain)	15 October 1983 (aged 24)	39	6	(Austrian Football Association) Red Bull Salzburg (Note: Ivanschitz was on loan to Panathinaikos.)
11	MF	Ümit Korkmaz	17 September 1985 (aged 22)	2	0	(Austrian Football Association) Rapid Wien (Note: Korkmaz joined Eintracht Frankfurt after the tournament.)
12	DF	Ronald Gërçaliu	12 February 1986 (aged 22)	11	0	(Austrian Football Association) Red Bull Salzburg (Note: Gërçaliu was on loan to Austria Wien.)
13	DF	Markus Katzer	11 December 1979 (aged 28)	11	0	(Austrian Football Association) Rapid Wien
14	DF	György Garics	8 March 1984 (aged 24)	12	1	(Italian Football Federation) Napoli
15	DF	Sebastian Prödl	21 June 1987 (aged 20)	10	2	(Austrian Football Association) Sturm Graz (Note: Prödl joined Werder Bremen after the tournament.)
16	DF	Jürgen Patocka	30 July 1977 (aged 30)	2	0	(Austrian Football Association) Rapid Wien
17	DF	Martin Hiden	11 March 1973 (aged 35)	49	1	(Austrian Football Association) Rapid Wien (Note: Hiden was on loan to Austria Kärnten.)
18	FW	Roman Kienast	29 March 1984 (aged 24)	6	1	(Norwegian Football Federation) HamKam
19	MF	Jürgen Säumel	8 September 1984 (aged 23)	11	0	(Austrian Football Association) Sturm Graz
20	FW	Martin Harnik	10 June 1987 (aged 20)	8	2	(German Football Association) Werder Bremen
21	GK	Jürgen Macho	24 August 1977 (aged 30)	14	0	(Hellenic Football Federation) AEK Athens
22	FW	Erwin Hoffer	14 April 1987 (aged 21)	4	0	(Austrian Football Association) Rapid Wien
23	GK	Ramazan Özcan	28 June 1984 (aged 23)	0	0	(Austrian Football Association) Red Bull Salzburg (Note: Özcan was on loan to 1899 Hoffenheim and joined them permanently after the tournament.)

=== Croatia ===
Manager: Slaven Bilić

No.	Pos.	Player	Date of birth (age)	Caps	Goals	Club
1	GK	Stipe Pletikosa	8 January 1979 (aged 29)	69	0	(Russian Football Union) Spartak Moscow
2	DF	Dario Šimić	12 November 1975 (aged 32)	98	3	(Italian Football Federation) Milan
3	DF	Josip Šimunić	18 February 1978 (aged 30)	62	3	(German Football Association) Hertha BSC
4	DF	Robert Kovač	6 April 1974 (aged 34)	74	0	(German Football Association) Borussia Dortmund
5	DF	Vedran Ćorluka	5 February 1986 (aged 22)	20	0	(The Football Association) Manchester City
6	DF	Hrvoje Vejić	8 June 1977 (aged 30)	2	0	(Russian Football Union) Tom Tomsk
7	MF	Ivan Rakitić	10 March 1988 (aged 20)	8	1	(German Football Association) Schalke 04
8	MF	Ognjen Vukojević	20 December 1983 (aged 24)	5	1	(Croatian Football Federation) Dinamo Zagreb (Note: Vukojević joined Dynamo Kyiv after the tournament.)
9	FW	Nikola Kalinić	5 January 1988 (aged 20)	1	0	(Croatian Football Federation) Hajduk Split
10	MF	Niko Kovač (captain)	15 October 1971 (aged 36)	77	14	(Austrian Football Association) Red Bull Salzburg
11	DF	Darijo Srna	1 May 1982 (aged 26)	55	15	(Ukrainian Association of Football) Shakhtar Donetsk
12	GK	Mario Galinović	15 November 1976 (aged 31)	2	0	(Hellenic Football Federation) Panathinaikos
13	MF	Nikola Pokrivač	26 November 1985 (aged 22)	1	0	(French Football Federation) Monaco
14	MF	Luka Modrić	9 September 1985 (aged 22)	26	3	(Croatian Football Federation) Dinamo Zagreb (Note: Modrić joined Tottenham Hotspur after the tournament.)
15	DF	Dario Knežević	20 April 1982 (aged 26)	7	1	(Italian Football Federation) Livorno
16	MF	Jerko Leko	9 April 1980 (aged 28)	52	2	(French Football Federation) Monaco
17	FW	Ivan Klasnić	29 January 1980 (aged 28)	29	8	(German Football Association) Werder Bremen
18	FW	Ivica Olić	14 September 1979 (aged 28)	54	9	(German Football Association) Hamburger SV
19	MF	Niko Kranjčar	13 August 1984 (aged 23)	41	7	(The Football Association) Portsmouth
20	FW	Igor Budan	22 April 1980 (aged 28)	5	0	(Italian Football Federation) Parma
21	FW	Mladen Petrić	1 January 1981 (aged 27)	24	9	(German Football Association) Borussia Dortmund
22	MF	Danijel Pranjić	2 December 1981 (aged 26)	11	0	(Royal Dutch Football Association) Heerenveen
23	GK	Vedran Runje	10 February 1976 (aged 32)	4	0	(French Football Federation) Lens

=== Germany ===
Manager: Joachim Löw

No.	Pos.	Player	Date of birth (age)	Caps	Goals	Club
1	GK	Jens Lehmann	10 November 1969 (aged 38)	55	0	(The Football Association) Arsenal (Note: Lehmann joined VfB Stuttgart after the tournament.)
2	DF	Marcell Jansen	4 November 1985 (aged 22)	22	1	(German Football Association) Bayern Munich
3	DF	Arne Friedrich	29 May 1979 (aged 29)	57	0	(German Football Association) Hertha BSC
4	DF	Clemens Fritz	7 December 1980 (aged 27)	14	2	(German Football Association) Werder Bremen
5	DF	Heiko Westermann	14 August 1983 (aged 24)	3	0	(German Football Association) Schalke 04
6	MF	Simon Rolfes	21 January 1982 (aged 26)	10	0	(German Football Association) Bayer Leverkusen
7	MF	Bastian Schweinsteiger	1 August 1984 (aged 23)	51	13	(German Football Association) Bayern Munich
8	MF	Torsten Frings	22 November 1976 (aged 31)	72	10	(German Football Association) Werder Bremen
9	FW	Mario Gómez	10 July 1985 (aged 22)	10	6	(German Football Association) VfB Stuttgart
10	FW	Oliver Neuville	1 May 1973 (aged 35)	68	10	(German Football Association) Borussia Mönchengladbach
11	FW	Miroslav Klose	9 June 1978 (aged 29)	75	39	(German Football Association) Bayern Munich
12	GK	Robert Enke	24 August 1977 (aged 30)	1	0	(German Football Association) Hannover 96
13	MF	Michael Ballack (captain)	26 September 1976 (aged 31)	81	36	(The Football Association) Chelsea
14	MF	Piotr Trochowski	22 March 1984 (aged 24)	12	0	(German Football Association) Hamburger SV
15	MF	Thomas Hitzlsperger	5 April 1982 (aged 26)	33	5	(German Football Association) VfB Stuttgart
16	DF	Philipp Lahm	11 November 1983 (aged 24)	41	2	(German Football Association) Bayern Munich
17	DF	Per Mertesacker	29 September 1984 (aged 23)	43	1	(German Football Association) Werder Bremen
18	MF	Tim Borowski	2 May 1980 (aged 28)	31	2	(German Football Association) Werder Bremen (Note: Borowski joined Bayern Munich after the tournament.)
19	MF	David Odonkor	21 February 1984 (aged 24)	15	1	(Royal Spanish Football Federation) Real Betis
20	FW	Lukas Podolski	4 June 1985 (aged 23)	48	25	(German Football Association) Bayern Munich
21	DF	Christoph Metzelder	5 November 1980 (aged 27)	41	0	(Royal Spanish Football Federation) Real Madrid
22	FW	Kevin Kurányi	2 March 1982 (aged 26)	47	19	(German Football Association) Schalke 04
23	GK	René Adler	15 January 1985 (aged 23)	0	0	(German Football Association) Bayer Leverkusen

=== Poland ===
Manager: (Netherlands) Leo Beenhakker

Jakub Błaszczykowski injured a hamstring on 5 June and was replaced by Łukasz Piszczek. Tomasz Kuszczak injured his back on 6 June and was replaced by Wojciech Kowalewski.

No.	Pos.	Player	Date of birth (age)	Caps	Goals	Club
1	GK	Artur Boruc	20 February 1980 (aged 28)	34	0	(Scottish Football Association) Celtic
2	DF	Mariusz Jop	3 August 1978 (aged 29)	24	0	(Russian Football Union) FC Moscow
3	DF	Jakub Wawrzyniak	7 July 1983 (aged 24)	11	0	(Polish Football Association) Legia Warsaw
4	DF	Paweł Golański	12 October 1982 (aged 25)	10	1	(Romanian Football Federation) Steaua București
5	MF	Dariusz Dudka	9 December 1983 (aged 24)	26	2	(Polish Football Association) Wisła Kraków
6	DF	Jacek Bąk	24 March 1973 (aged 35)	94	3	(Austrian Football Association) Austria Wien
7	FW	Ebi Smolarek	9 January 1981 (aged 27)	31	13	(Royal Spanish Football Federation) Racing Santander
8	FW	Jacek Krzynówek	15 May 1976 (aged 32)	79	15	(German Football Association) VfL Wolfsburg
9	FW	Maciej Żurawski (captain)	12 September 1976 (aged 31)	71	17	(Hellenic Football Federation) AEL
10	MF	Łukasz Garguła	25 February 1981 (aged 27)	12	1	(Polish Football Association) GKS Bełchatów
11	FW	Marek Saganowski	31 October 1978 (aged 29)	23	3	(The Football Association) Southampton
12	GK	Wojciech Kowalewski	11 May 1977 (aged 31)	10	0	(Polish Football Association) Korona Kielce
13	DF	Marcin Wasilewski	9 June 1980 (aged 27)	27	1	(Royal Belgian Football Association) Anderlecht
14	DF	Michał Żewłakow	22 April 1976 (aged 32)	76	2	(Hellenic Football Federation) Olympiacos
15	MF	Michał Pazdan	21 September 1987 (aged 20)	5	0	(Polish Football Association) Górnik Zabrze
16	DF	Łukasz Piszczek	3 June 1985 (aged 23)	3	0	(German Football Association) Hertha BSC
17	MF	Wojciech Łobodziński	20 October 1982 (aged 25)	16	2	(Polish Football Association) Wisła Kraków
18	DF	Mariusz Lewandowski	18 May 1979 (aged 29)	47	3	(Ukrainian Association of Football) Shakhtar Donetsk
19	MF	Rafał Murawski	9 October 1981 (aged 26)	9	1	(Polish Football Association) Lech Poznań
20	MF	Roger Guerreiro	25 May 1982 (aged 26)	2	0	(Polish Football Association) Legia Warsaw
21	FW	Tomasz Zahorski	22 November 1984 (aged 23)	9	1	(Polish Football Association) Górnik Zabrze
22	GK	Łukasz Fabiański	18 April 1985 (aged 23)	8	0	(The Football Association) Arsenal
23	DF	Adam Kokoszka	6 October 1986 (aged 21)	7	2	(Polish Football Association) Wisła Kraków

== Group C ==
=== France ===
Manager: Raymond Domenech

No.	Pos.	Player	Date of birth (age)	Caps	Goals	Club
1	GK	Steve Mandanda	28 March 1985 (aged 23)	1	0	(French Football Federation) Marseille
2	DF	Jean-Alain Boumsong	14 December 1979 (aged 28)	23	1	(French Football Federation) Lyon
3	DF	Eric Abidal	11 September 1979 (aged 28)	35	0	(Royal Spanish Football Federation) Barcelona
4	MF	Patrick Vieira (captain)	23 June 1976 (aged 31)	105	6	(Italian Football Federation) Internazionale
5	DF	William Gallas	17 August 1977 (aged 30)	62	2	(The Football Association) Arsenal
6	MF	Claude Makélélé	18 February 1973 (aged 35)	68	0	(The Football Association) Chelsea
7	MF	Florent Malouda	13 June 1980 (aged 27)	39	3	(The Football Association) Chelsea
8	FW	Nicolas Anelka	14 March 1979 (aged 29)	48	11	(The Football Association) Chelsea
9	FW	Karim Benzema	19 December 1987 (aged 20)	11	3	(French Football Federation) Lyon
10	FW	Sidney Govou	27 July 1979 (aged 28)	32	7	(French Football Federation) Lyon
11	MF	Samir Nasri	20 June 1987 (aged 20)	10	2	(French Football Federation) Marseille
12	FW	Thierry Henry	17 August 1977 (aged 30)	100	44	(Royal Spanish Football Federation) Barcelona
13	DF	Patrice Evra	15 May 1981 (aged 27)	11	0	(The Football Association) Manchester United
14	DF	François Clerc	18 April 1983 (aged 25)	12	0	(French Football Federation) Lyon
15	DF	Lilian Thuram	1 January 1972 (aged 36)	140	2	(Royal Spanish Football Federation) Barcelona
16	GK	Sébastien Frey	18 March 1980 (aged 28)	2	0	(Italian Football Federation) Fiorentina
17	DF	Sébastien Squillaci	11 August 1980 (aged 27)	13	0	(French Football Federation) Lyon
18	FW	Bafétimbi Gomis	6 August 1985 (aged 22)	2	2	(French Football Federation) Saint-Étienne
19	DF	Willy Sagnol	18 March 1977 (aged 31)	56	0	(German Football Association) Bayern Munich
20	MF	Jérémy Toulalan	10 September 1983 (aged 24)	13	0	(French Football Federation) Lyon
21	MF	Lassana Diarra	10 March 1985 (aged 23)	13	0	(The Football Association) Portsmouth
22	MF	Franck Ribéry	7 April 1983 (aged 25)	27	4	(German Football Association) Bayern Munich
23	GK	Grégory Coupet	31 December 1972 (aged 35)	31	0	(French Football Federation) Lyon

=== Italy ===
Manager: Roberto Donadoni

Fabio Cannavaro was ruled out of the Italian squad on 2 June after he was injured in training; he was replaced by Alessandro Gamberini.

No.	Pos.	Player	Date of birth (age)	Caps	Goals	Club
1	GK	Gianluigi Buffon	28 January 1978 (aged 30)	82	0	(Italian Football Federation) Juventus
2	DF	Christian Panucci	12 April 1973 (aged 35)	53	3	(Italian Football Federation) Roma
3	DF	Fabio Grosso	28 November 1977 (aged 30)	31	3	(French Football Federation) Lyon
4	DF	Giorgio Chiellini	14 August 1984 (aged 23)	10	1	(Italian Football Federation) Juventus
5	DF	Alessandro Gamberini	27 August 1981 (aged 26)	2	0	(Italian Football Federation) Fiorentina
6	DF	Andrea Barzagli	8 May 1981 (aged 27)	22	0	(Italian Football Federation) Palermo (Note: Barzagli joined VfL Wolfsburg after the tournament.)
7	FW	Alessandro Del Piero (captain)	9 November 1974 (aged 33)	86	27	(Italian Football Federation) Juventus
8	MF	Gennaro Gattuso	9 January 1978 (aged 30)	58	1	(Italian Football Federation) Milan
9	FW	Luca Toni	26 May 1977 (aged 31)	34	15	(German Football Association) Bayern Munich
10	MF	Daniele De Rossi	24 July 1983 (aged 24)	33	4	(Italian Football Federation) Roma
11	FW	Antonio Di Natale	13 October 1977 (aged 30)	18	7	(Italian Football Federation) Udinese
12	FW	Marco Borriello	18 June 1982 (aged 25)	3	0	(Italian Football Federation) Genoa (Note: Borriello joined Milan after the tournament.)
13	MF	Massimo Ambrosini	29 May 1977 (aged 31)	31	0	(Italian Football Federation) Milan
14	GK	Marco Amelia	2 April 1982 (aged 26)	6	0	(Italian Football Federation) Livorno (Note: Amelia joined Palermo after the tournament.)
15	FW	Fabio Quagliarella	31 January 1983 (aged 25)	8	3	(Italian Football Federation) Udinese
16	MF	Mauro Camoranesi	4 October 1976 (aged 31)	35	4	(Italian Football Federation) Juventus
17	GK	Morgan De Sanctis	26 March 1977 (aged 31)	2	0	(Royal Spanish Football Federation) Sevilla
18	FW	Antonio Cassano	12 July 1982 (aged 25)	11	3	(Italian Football Federation) Sampdoria
19	DF	Gianluca Zambrotta	19 February 1977 (aged 31)	71	2	(Royal Spanish Football Federation) Barcelona (Note: Zambrotta joined Milan after the tournament.)
20	MF	Simone Perrotta	17 September 1977 (aged 30)	41	2	(Italian Football Federation) Roma
21	MF	Andrea Pirlo	19 May 1979 (aged 29)	46	6	(Italian Football Federation) Milan
22	MF	Alberto Aquilani	7 July 1984 (aged 23)	5	0	(Italian Football Federation) Roma
23	DF	Marco Materazzi	19 August 1973 (aged 34)	40	2	(Italian Football Federation) Internazionale

=== Netherlands ===
Manager: Marco van Basten

Ryan Babel was ruled out of the Dutch squad on 31 May after he was injured in training; he was replaced by Khalid Boulahrouz.

No.	Pos.	Player	Date of birth (age)	Caps	Goals	Club
1	GK	Edwin van der Sar (captain)	29 October 1970 (aged 37)	125	0	(The Football Association) Manchester United
2	DF	André Ooijer	11 July 1974 (aged 33)	37	2	(The Football Association) Blackburn Rovers
3	DF	John Heitinga	15 November 1983 (aged 24)	36	5	(Royal Dutch Football Association) Ajax (Note: Heitinga joined Atlético Madrid after the tournament.)
4	DF	Joris Mathijsen	5 April 1980 (aged 28)	32	2	(German Football Association) Hamburger SV
5	DF	Giovanni van Bronckhorst	5 February 1975 (aged 33)	78	4	(Royal Dutch Football Association) Feyenoord
6	MF	Demy de Zeeuw	26 May 1983 (aged 25)	15	0	(Royal Dutch Football Association) AZ
7	FW	Robin van Persie	6 August 1983 (aged 24)	24	7	(The Football Association) Arsenal
8	MF	Orlando Engelaar	24 August 1979 (aged 28)	6	0	(Royal Dutch Football Association) Twente
9	FW	Ruud van Nistelrooy	1 July 1976 (aged 31)	61	31	(Royal Spanish Football Federation) Real Madrid
10	MF	Wesley Sneijder	9 June 1984 (aged 23)	45	9	(Royal Spanish Football Federation) Real Madrid
11	FW	Arjen Robben	23 January 1984 (aged 24)	33	9	(Royal Spanish Football Federation) Real Madrid
12	DF	Mario Melchiot	4 November 1976 (aged 31)	21	0	(The Football Association) Wigan Athletic
13	GK	Henk Timmer	3 December 1971 (aged 36)	5	0	(Royal Dutch Football Association) Feyenoord
14	DF	Wilfred Bouma	15 June 1978 (aged 29)	33	2	(The Football Association) Aston Villa
15	DF	Tim de Cler	8 November 1978 (aged 29)	15	0	(Royal Dutch Football Association) Feyenoord
16	GK	Maarten Stekelenburg	22 September 1982 (aged 25)	11	0	(Royal Dutch Football Association) Ajax
17	MF	Nigel de Jong	30 November 1984 (aged 23)	23	0	(German Football Association) Hamburger SV
18	FW	Dirk Kuyt	22 July 1980 (aged 27)	38	7	(The Football Association) Liverpool
19	FW	Klaas-Jan Huntelaar	12 August 1983 (aged 24)	12	7	(Royal Dutch Football Association) Ajax
20	MF	Ibrahim Afellay	2 April 1986 (aged 22)	5	0	(Royal Dutch Football Association) PSV Eindhoven
21	DF	Khalid Boulahrouz	28 December 1981 (aged 26)	22	0	(The Football Association) Chelsea (Note: Boulahrouz was on loan to Sevilla.)
22	FW	Jan Vennegoor of Hesselink	7 November 1978 (aged 29)	16	3	(Scottish Football Association) Celtic
23	MF	Rafael van der Vaart	11 February 1983 (aged 25)	55	12	(German Football Association) Hamburger SV

=== Romania ===
Manager: Victor Piţurcă

No.	Pos.	Player	Date of birth (age)	Caps	Goals	Club
1	GK	Bogdan Lobonț	18 January 1978 (aged 30)	63	0	(Romanian Football Federation) Dinamo București
2	DF	Cosmin Contra	15 December 1975 (aged 32)	63	7	(Royal Spanish Football Federation) Getafe
3	DF	Răzvan Raț	26 May 1981 (aged 27)	48	1	(Ukrainian Association of Football) Shakhtar Donetsk
4	DF	Gabriel Tamaș	9 November 1983 (aged 24)	32	2	(French Football Federation) Auxerre
5	DF	Cristian Chivu (captain)	26 October 1980 (aged 27)	59	3	(Italian Football Federation) Internazionale
6	MF	Mirel Rădoi	22 March 1981 (aged 27)	43	1	(Romanian Football Federation) Steaua București
7	MF	Florentin Petre	15 January 1976 (aged 32)	50	5	(Bulgarian Football Union) CSKA Sofia
8	MF	Paul Codrea	4 April 1981 (aged 27)	33	1	(Italian Football Federation) Siena
9	FW	Ciprian Marica	2 October 1985 (aged 22)	24	8	(German Football Association) VfB Stuttgart
10	FW	Adrian Mutu	8 January 1979 (aged 29)	61	28	(Italian Football Federation) Fiorentina
11	MF	Răzvan Cociș	19 February 1983 (aged 25)	21	1	(Russian Football Union) Lokomotiv Moscow
12	GK	Marius Popa	31 July 1978 (aged 29)	2	0	(Romanian Football Federation) Politehnica Timișoara
13	DF	Cristian Săpunaru	5 April 1984 (aged 24)	1	0	(Romanian Football Federation) Rapid București
14	DF	Sorin Ghionea	11 May 1979 (aged 29)	10	1	(Romanian Football Federation) Steaua București
15	DF	Dorin Goian	12 December 1980 (aged 27)	19	3	(Romanian Football Federation) Steaua București
16	MF	Bănel Nicoliță	7 January 1985 (aged 23)	20	1	(Romanian Football Federation) Steaua București
17	DF	Cosmin Moți	3 December 1984 (aged 23)	2	0	(Romanian Football Federation) Dinamo București
18	FW	Marius Niculae	16 May 1981 (aged 27)	30	13	(Scottish Football Association) Inverness Caledonian Thistle
19	MF	Adrian Cristea	30 November 1983 (aged 24)	6	0	(Romanian Football Federation) Dinamo București
20	MF	Nicolae Dică	9 May 1980 (aged 28)	25	8	(Romanian Football Federation) Steaua București
21	FW	Daniel Niculae	6 October 1982 (aged 25)	22	5	(French Football Federation) Auxerre
22	DF	Ștefan Radu	22 October 1986 (aged 21)	8	0	(Romanian Football Federation) Dinamo București (Note: Radu was on loan to Lazio.)
23	GK	Eduard Stăncioiu	3 March 1981 (aged 27)	1	0	(Romanian Football Federation) CFR Cluj

== Group D ==
=== Greece ===
Manager: (Germany) Otto Rehhagel

No.	Pos.	Player	Date of birth (age)	Caps	Goals	Club
1	GK	Antonios Nikopolidis	14 January 1971 (aged 37)	87	0	(Hellenic Football Federation) Olympiacos
2	DF	Giourkas Seitaridis	4 June 1981 (aged 27)	56	1	(Royal Spanish Football Federation) Atlético Madrid
3	MF	Christos Patsatzoglou	19 March 1979 (aged 29)	29	1	(Hellenic Football Federation) Olympiacos
4	DF	Nikos Spiropoulos	10 October 1983 (aged 24)	5	0	(Hellenic Football Federation) Panathinaikos
5	DF	Traianos Dellas	31 January 1976 (aged 32)	42	1	(Hellenic Football Federation) AEK Athens
6	MF	Angelos Basinas (captain)	3 January 1976 (aged 32)	88	7	(Royal Spanish Football Federation) Mallorca
7	FW	Georgios Samaras	21 February 1985 (aged 23)	18	3	(The Football Association) Manchester City (Note: Samaras was on loan to Celtic.)
8	MF	Stelios Giannakopoulos	12 July 1974 (aged 33)	75	12	(The Football Association) Bolton Wanderers
9	FW	Angelos Charisteas	9 February 1980 (aged 28)	65	18	(German Football Association) 1. FC Nürnberg
10	MF	Giorgos Karagounis	6 March 1977 (aged 31)	73	6	(Hellenic Football Federation) Panathinaikos
11	DF	Loukas Vyntra	5 February 1981 (aged 27)	18	0	(Hellenic Football Federation) Panathinaikos
12	GK	Konstantinos Chalkias	30 May 1974 (aged 34)	15	0	(Hellenic Football Federation) Aris (Note: Chalkias joined PAOK after the tournament.)
13	GK	Alexandros Tzorvas	12 August 1982 (aged 25)	0	0	(Hellenic Football Federation) OFI
14	FW	Dimitris Salpingidis	18 August 1981 (aged 26)	21	1	(Hellenic Football Federation) Panathinaikos
15	DF	Vasilis Torosidis	10 June 1985 (aged 22)	13	0	(Hellenic Football Federation) Olympiacos
16	DF	Sotirios Kyrgiakos	23 July 1979 (aged 28)	38	4	(German Football Association) Eintracht Frankfurt
17	FW	Theofanis Gekas	23 May 1980 (aged 28)	27	6	(German Football Association) Bayer Leverkusen
18	DF	Yannis Goumas	24 May 1975 (aged 33)	45	0	(Hellenic Football Federation) Panathinaikos
19	DF	Paraskevas Antzas	18 August 1976 (aged 31)	24	0	(Hellenic Football Federation) Olympiacos
20	FW	Ioannis Amanatidis	3 December 1981 (aged 26)	26	3	(German Football Association) Eintracht Frankfurt
21	MF	Kostas Katsouranis	21 June 1979 (aged 28)	49	6	(Portuguese Football Federation) Benfica
22	MF	Alexandros Tziolis	13 February 1985 (aged 23)	8	0	(Hellenic Football Federation) Panathinaikos
23	FW	Nikos Liberopoulos	4 August 1975 (aged 32)	59	13	(Hellenic Football Federation) AEK Athens

=== Russia ===
Manager: (Netherlands) Guus Hiddink

Pavel Pogrebnyak failed to recover from injury and was replaced by Oleg Ivanov on 7 June.

No.	Pos.	Player	Date of birth (age)	Caps	Goals	Club
1	GK	Igor Akinfeev	8 April 1986 (aged 22)	20	0	(Russian Football Union) CSKA Moscow
2	DF	Vasili Berezutski	20 June 1982 (aged 25)	29	1	(Russian Football Union) CSKA Moscow
3	DF	Renat Yanbayev	7 April 1984 (aged 24)	2	0	(Russian Football Union) Lokomotiv Moscow
4	DF	Sergei Ignashevich	14 July 1979 (aged 28)	37	3	(Russian Football Union) CSKA Moscow
5	DF	Aleksei Berezutski	20 June 1982 (aged 25)	32	0	(Russian Football Union) CSKA Moscow
6	FW	Roman Adamov	21 June 1982 (aged 25)	2	0	(Russian Football Union) FC Moscow
7	MF	Dmitri Torbinski	28 April 1984 (aged 24)	11	1	(Russian Football Union) Lokomotiv Moscow
8	DF	Denis Kolodin	11 January 1982 (aged 26)	13	0	(Russian Football Union) Dynamo Moscow
9	MF	Ivan Saenko	17 October 1983 (aged 24)	7	0	(German Football Association) 1. FC Nürnberg
10	FW	Andrey Arshavin	29 May 1981 (aged 27)	34	11	(Russian Football Union) Zenit Saint Petersburg
11	MF	Sergei Semak (captain)	27 February 1976 (aged 32)	46	4	(Russian Football Union) Rubin Kazan
12	GK	Vladimir Gabulov	19 October 1983 (aged 24)	5	0	(Russian Football Union) Dynamo Moscow
13	MF	Oleg Ivanov	4 August 1986 (aged 21)	0	0	(Russian Football Union) Krylia Sovetov Samara
14	DF	Roman Shirokov	6 July 1981 (aged 26)	4	0	(Russian Football Union) Zenit Saint Petersburg
15	MF	Diniyar Bilyaletdinov	27 February 1985 (aged 23)	23	2	(Russian Football Union) Lokomotiv Moscow
16	GK	Vyacheslav Malafeev	4 March 1979 (aged 29)	16	0	(Russian Football Union) Zenit Saint Petersburg
17	MF	Konstantin Zyryanov	5 October 1977 (aged 30)	12	2	(Russian Football Union) Zenit Saint Petersburg
18	DF	Yuri Zhirkov	20 August 1983 (aged 24)	19	0	(Russian Football Union) CSKA Moscow
19	FW	Roman Pavlyuchenko	15 December 1981 (aged 26)	17	6	(Russian Football Union) Spartak Moscow
20	MF	Igor Semshov	6 April 1978 (aged 30)	27	0	(Russian Football Union) Dynamo Moscow
21	FW	Dmitri Sychev	26 October 1983 (aged 24)	41	15	(Russian Football Union) Lokomotiv Moscow
22	DF	Aleksandr Anyukov	28 September 1982 (aged 25)	32	1	(Russian Football Union) Zenit Saint Petersburg
23	MF	Vladimir Bystrov	31 January 1984 (aged 24)	20	4	(Russian Football Union) Spartak Moscow

=== Spain ===
Manager: Luis Aragonés

No.	Pos.	Player	Date of birth (age)	Caps	Goals	Club
1	GK	Iker Casillas (captain)	20 May 1981 (aged 27)	77	0	(Royal Spanish Football Federation) Real Madrid
2	DF	Raúl Albiol	4 September 1985 (aged 22)	4	0	(Royal Spanish Football Federation) Valencia
3	DF	Fernando Navarro	25 June 1982 (aged 25)	1	0	(Royal Spanish Football Federation) Mallorca
4	DF	Carlos Marchena	31 July 1979 (aged 28)	42	2	(Royal Spanish Football Federation) Valencia
5	DF	Carles Puyol	13 April 1978 (aged 30)	61	1	(Royal Spanish Football Federation) Barcelona
6	MF	Andrés Iniesta	11 May 1984 (aged 24)	23	5	(Royal Spanish Football Federation) Barcelona
7	FW	David Villa	3 December 1981 (aged 26)	31	14	(Royal Spanish Football Federation) Valencia
8	MF	Xavi	25 January 1980 (aged 28)	58	6	(Royal Spanish Football Federation) Barcelona
9	FW	Fernando Torres	20 March 1984 (aged 24)	49	15	(The Football Association) Liverpool
10	MF	Cesc Fàbregas	4 May 1987 (aged 21)	26	0	(The Football Association) Arsenal
11	DF	Joan Capdevila	3 February 1978 (aged 30)	18	3	(Royal Spanish Football Federation) Villarreal
12	MF	Santi Cazorla	13 December 1984 (aged 23)	2	0	(Royal Spanish Football Federation) Villarreal
13	GK	Andrés Palop	22 October 1973 (aged 34)	0	0	(Royal Spanish Football Federation) Sevilla
14	MF	Xabi Alonso	25 November 1981 (aged 26)	43	1	(The Football Association) Liverpool
15	DF	Sergio Ramos	30 March 1986 (aged 22)	34	4	(Royal Spanish Football Federation) Real Madrid
16	FW	Sergio García	9 June 1983 (aged 24)	1	0	(Royal Spanish Football Federation) Zaragoza
17	FW	Daniel Güiza	17 August 1980 (aged 27)	4	0	(Royal Spanish Football Federation) Mallorca
18	DF	Álvaro Arbeloa	17 January 1983 (aged 25)	2	0	(The Football Association) Liverpool
19	MF	Marcos Senna	17 July 1976 (aged 31)	11	0	(Royal Spanish Football Federation) Villarreal
20	DF	Juanito	23 July 1976 (aged 31)	23	2	(Royal Spanish Football Federation) Real Betis
21	MF	David Silva	8 January 1986 (aged 22)	14	2	(Royal Spanish Football Federation) Valencia
22	MF	Rubén de la Red	5 June 1985 (aged 23)	2	0	(Royal Spanish Football Federation) Getafe (Note: De la Red joined Real Madrid after the tournament.)
23	GK	Pepe Reina	31 August 1982 (aged 25)	9	0	(The Football Association) Liverpool

=== Sweden ===
Manager: Lars Lagerbäck

No.	Pos.	Player	Date of birth (age)	Caps	Goals	Club
1	GK	Andreas Isaksson	3 October 1981 (aged 26)	56	0	(The Football Association) Manchester City
2	DF	Mikael Nilsson	24 June 1978 (aged 29)	47	3	(Hellenic Football Federation) Panathinaikos
3	DF	Olof Mellberg	3 September 1977 (aged 30)	82	4	(The Football Association) Aston Villa (Note: Mellberg joined Juventus after the tournament.)
4	DF	Petter Hansson	14 December 1976 (aged 31)	32	1	(French Football Federation) Rennes
5	DF	Fredrik Stoor	28 February 1984 (aged 24)	5	0	(Norwegian Football Federation) Rosenborg
6	MF	Tobias Linderoth	21 April 1979 (aged 29)	75	2	(Turkish Football Federation) Galatasaray
7	MF	Niclas Alexandersson	29 December 1971 (aged 36)	108	7	(Swedish Football Association) IFK Göteborg
8	MF	Anders Svensson	17 July 1976 (aged 31)	90	15	(Swedish Football Association) Elfsborg
9	MF	Freddie Ljungberg (captain)	16 April 1977 (aged 31)	72	14	(The Football Association) West Ham United
10	FW	Zlatan Ibrahimović	3 October 1981 (aged 26)	50	18	(Italian Football Federation) Internazionale
11	FW	Johan Elmander	27 May 1981 (aged 27)	35	11	(French Football Federation) Toulouse
12	GK	Rami Shaaban	30 June 1975 (aged 32)	16	0	(Swedish Football Association) Hammarby
13	GK	Johan Wiland	24 January 1981 (aged 27)	3	0	(Swedish Football Association) Elfsborg
14	DF	Daniel Majstorović	5 April 1977 (aged 31)	15	1	(Swiss Football Association) Basel (Note: Majstorović joined AEK Athens after the tournament.)
15	DF	Andreas Granqvist	16 April 1985 (aged 23)	3	0	(The Football Association) Wigan Athletic (Note: Granqvist was on loan to Helsingborg.)
16	MF	Kim Källström	24 August 1982 (aged 25)	55	8	(French Football Federation) Lyon
17	FW	Henrik Larsson	20 September 1971 (aged 36)	95	36	(Swedish Football Association) Helsingborg
18	MF	Sebastian Larsson	6 June 1985 (aged 23)	4	0	(The Football Association) Birmingham City
19	MF	Daniel Andersson	28 August 1977 (aged 30)	62	0	(Swedish Football Association) Malmö FF
20	FW	Marcus Allbäck	5 July 1973 (aged 34)	73	30	(Danish Football Association) Copenhagen (Note: Allbäck joined Örgryte after the tournament.)
21	MF	Christian Wilhelmsson	8 December 1979 (aged 28)	51	4	(French Football Federation) Nantes (Note: Wilhelmsson was on loan to Deportivo La Coruña.)
22	FW	Markus Rosenberg	27 September 1982 (aged 25)	21	6	(German Football Association) Werder Bremen
23	DF	Mikael Dorsin	6 October 1981 (aged 26)	12	0	(Romanian Football Federation) CFR Cluj

== Player representation ==
by club

Players	Clubs
11	Lyon
9	Bayern Munich, Galatasaray
8	Barcelona, Chelsea, Panathinaikos
7	Arsenal, Real Madrid, Red Bull Salzburg, Werder Bremen
6	Fenerbahçe, Hamburger SV, Lokomotiv Moscow, Porto, Steaua București
5	CSKA Moscow, Juventus, Liverpool, Milan, 1. FC Nürnberg, Olympiacos, Rapid Wien, Spartak Moscow, VfB Stuttgart, Valencia, Zenit Saint Petersburg

By club nationality

Players	Clubs
55	Germany
45	England
39	Spain
36	Italy
30	Russia
26	France
20	Greece
18	Austria
17	Turkey
14	Portugal, Romania
10	Netherlands, Poland
7	Switzerland
6	Sweden
4	Belgium
3	Croatia, Denmark, Scotland, Ukraine
2	Czech Republic, Norway
1	Bulgaria

Nations in italics were not represented by their national teams in the finals

by representatives of domestic league

Nation	No. of players playing in home leagues
Austria	15
Croatia	3
Czech Republic	2
France	10
Germany	19
Greece	14
Italy	19
Netherlands	9
Poland	10
Portugal	12
Romania	12
Russia	22
Spain	18
Sweden	6
Switzerland	6
Turkey	16
