= Domenico Botticella =

Italian footballer (born 1976)

Personal information
- Full name: Domenico Botticella
- Date of birth: 2 March 1976 (age 50)
- Place of birth: San Giovanni Rotondo, Italy
- Height: 1.89 m (6 ft 2 in)
- Position: Goalkeeper

Team information
- Current team: Casertana (goalkeeping coach)

Youth career
- 1995–1997: Foggia

Senior career*
Years	Team	Apps	(Gls)
1997–2000	Foggia	34	(0)
1997–1998	→ Chieti (loan)	11	(0)
2000–2005	Salernitana	73	(0)
2005–2006	Manfredonia	1	(0)
2006–2007	Catanzaro	33	(0)
2007–2008	Paganese	34	(0)
2008–2009	Sorrento	15	(0)
2009	Arezzo	7	(0)
2010–2011	Cavese	2	(0)
2011–2013	Foggia	10	(0)
2013	Canosa		
- * Club domestic league appearances and goals as of July 2005

Domenico Botticella (born 2 March 1976) is an Italian football coach and former player, who used to play as a goalkeeper. He is the current goalkeeping coach of Casertana.

== Playing career ==
Botticella played in Serie B with Salernitana between 2000 and 2005. In his last season, he competed for a starting spot with Marco Ambrosio and Alex Brunner.

He also played for Foggia in Serie C1 and Serie C2.

Before joining Paganese, he played for Manfredonia of Serie C1 and Catanzaro of Serie C2.

On 28 July 2011, he joined Foggia on a free transfer after being released by Cavese.

In 2013 Botticella joined Apulian Prima Categoria amateur club Canosa.

== Coaching career ==
After retirement, Botticella embarked on a career as a goalkeeping coach, working alongside his former boss Delio Rossi in a number of clubs such as Levski Sofia, Palermo and Ascoli.

On 29 December 2022, he was hired as the new goalkeeping coach of Serie D club Casertana following the appointment of Vincenzo Cangelosi, former Zdeněk Zeman right-hand man, as new head coach.
