= Alessandro Gamberini =

Italian footballer (born 1981)

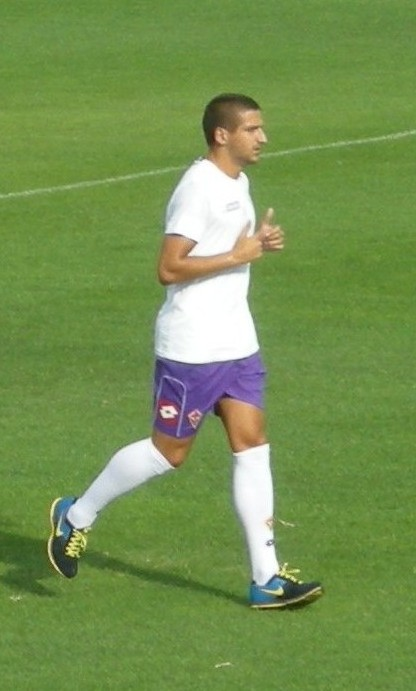
- Gamberini in action for Fiorentina in 2009

Personal information
- Date of birth: 27 August 1981 (age 45)
- Place of birth: Bologna, Italy
- Height: 1.85 m (6 ft 1 in)
- Position: Centre-back

Team information
- Current team: Virtus Verona (assistant)

Youth career
- Bologna

Senior career*
Years	Team	Apps	(Gls)
1999–2005	Bologna	78	(0)
2002–2003	→ Verona (loan)	20	(0)
2005–2012	Fiorentina	194	(6)
2012–2014	Napoli	25	(1)
2013–2014	→ Genoa (loan)	10	(0)
2014–2018	Chievo	85	(1)
Total		412	(8)

International career
2000	Italy U20	1	(0)
2001–2004	Italy U21	4	(0)
2007–2011	Italy	8	(0)
Medal record
Men's football
Representing Italy
UEFA European Under-21 Championship
Winner	2004 Germany
- * Club domestic league appearances and goals

Alessandro Gamberini (Italian pronunciation: [alesˈsandro ɡambeˈriːni]; born 27 August 1981) is an Italian former professional footballer who played as a central defender. He is working as assistant coach for Virtus Verona.

He spent most of his professional career with Fiorentina, appearing in 224 official games over the course of seven seasons. In Serie A, he also appeared for Bologna, Napoli, Genoa and Chievo.

An Italy international in the late 2000s, Gamberini represented the country at Euro 2008 and the 2009 Confederations Cup.

== Club career ==
=== Bologna ===
In the 2000 off-season, Gamberini was acquired by Juventus FC alongside Alex Pederzoli and Giacomo Cipriani in a pack deal for €5.16 million, in exchange for the remaining 50% of Jonatan Binotto's registration rights for the same amount, with 50% of Gamberini's rights being priced at €2.32 million. His co-ownership deal was terminated in the favour of Bologna in June 2002, for a peppercorn fee, making the Turin side register a loss of €1.5 million (the residual unamortised transfer fee of €4.64 in three years), but with a financial income of €2.32 million as Juve did not have to pay the remaining 50% registration rights.

=== Fiorentina ===
Following Bologna's relegation in 2005, Gamberini moved to ACF Fiorentina for €3.2 million, carving a starting XI niche in his second year as the Viola eventually qualified twice for the UEFA Champions League. On 4 March 2007, he scored two goals in a 5–1 home win over Torino FC, his first in 134 professional appearances.

At the end of 2007–08, Gamberini was voted as Fiorentina's player of the campaign. In February 2010, he was sidelined for three months after undergoing shoulder surgery.

In July 2011, Gamberini became Fiorentina's new captain as Riccardo Montolivo was stripped of that role.

=== Napoli ===
In July 2012, aged 31, Gamberini signed with S.S.C. Napoli along with teammate Valon Behrami, in a combined deal of around €8.5 million. He spent 2013–14 on loan to Genoa CFC.

=== Chievo ===
On 24 July 2014, Gamberini was sold to A.C. ChievoVerona. He scored his first and only league goal for them on 11 September 2016, helping the hosts earn one point following the 1–1 home draw to Lazio.

On 3 July 2018, 36-year-old Gamberini confirmed his retirement from professional football.

== International career ==
Gamberini was a member of the Italian under-21 team that won the 2004 UEFA European Championship under Claudio Gentile. He made his debut with the full side in a 2–0 friendly win against South Africa, on 17 October 2007.

Gamberini was not included in the original squad for UEFA Euro 2008, but was called up after captain Fabio Cannavaro tore ankle ligaments after a collision with teammate Giorgio Chiellini in training, on 2 June.

Gamberini was selected by Marcello Lippi for the 2009 FIFA Confederations Cup tournament, but once again failed to make an appearance as the nation was eliminated in the first round.

== Style of play ==
A physically strong centre-back, Gamberini was known for his tackling ability and aerial prowess.

== Coaching career ==
In July 2020, he was hired by Serie C club Virtus Verona as assistant coach.

== Career statistics ==
=== Club ===
Appearances and goals by club, season and competition
Club	Season	League			National Cup		Continental		Other		Total	
Club	Season	Division	Apps	Goals	Apps	Goals	Apps	Goals	Apps	Goals	Apps	Goals
Bologna	1999–00	Serie A	4	0	0	0	—		—		4	0
Bologna	2000–01	Serie A	15	0	0	0	—		—		15	0
Bologna	2001–02	Serie A	15	0	3	1	—		—		18	1
Bologna	2002–03	Serie A	0	0	0	0	2	0	—		2	0
Verona (loan)	2002–03	Serie B	20	0	1	0	—		—		21	0
Bologna	2003–04	Serie A	16	0	3	0	—		—		19	0
Bologna	2004–05	Serie A	28	0	3	0	—		2	0	33	0
Bologna	Total		78	0	9	1	2	0	2	0	91	1
Fiorentina	2005–06	Serie A	19	0	3	0	—		—		22	0
Fiorentina	2006–07	Serie A	28	3	1	0	—		—		29	3
Fiorentina	2007–08	Serie A	31	1	1	0	9	0	—		41	1
Fiorentina	2008–09	Serie A	34	0	0	0	8	0	—		42	0
Fiorentina	2009–10	Serie A	18	0	1	0	6	0	—		25	0
Fiorentina	2010–11	Serie A	35	1	1	0	—		—		36	1
Fiorentina	2011–12	Serie A	29	1	1	0	—		—		30	1
Fiorentina	Total		194	6	8	0	23	0	0	0	225	6
Napoli	2012–13	Serie A	25	1	0	0	5	0	—		30	1
Genoa (loan)	2013–14	Serie A	10	0	0	0	—		—		10	0
Chievo	2014–15	Serie A	20	0	0	0	—		—		20	0
Chievo	2015–16	Serie A	22	0	1	0	—		—		23	0
Chievo	2016–17	Serie A	20	1	1	0	—		—		21	1
Chievo	2017–18	Serie A	23	0	1	0	—		—		24	0
Chievo	Total		85	1	3	0	0	0	0	0	88	1
Career total			412	8	21	1	30	0	2	0	465	9

=== International ===
Appearances and goals by national team and year
National team	Year	Apps	Goals
Italy	2007	1	0
Italy	2008	3	0
Italy	2009	3	0
Italy	2010	0	0
Italy	2011	1	0
Total		8	0

== Honours ==
Italy U21

- UEFA European Under-21 Championship: 2004
