= Sterchele =

Sterchele is a surname. Notable people with the surname include:

- François Sterchele (1982–2008), Belgian footballer
- Giorgio Sterchele (born 1970), Italian footballer
