= Giuseppe Imburgia =

Italian footballer

Personal information
- Date of birth: 1 May 1980 (age 46)
- Place of birth: Saronno, Italy
- Height: 1.74 m (5 ft 8 1/2 in)
- Position: Defender

Youth career
- Internazionale

Senior career*
Years	Team	Apps	(Gls)
2000–2003	Internazionale	0	(0)
2001	→ Bellinzona (loan)	12	(0)
2001–2002	→ Varese (loan)	31	(0)
2002–2003	→ Spezia (loan)	11	(0)
2003–2008	Pro Patria	105	(1)
2008–2009	Spezia	28	(2)
2009–2010	Monopoli	14	(0)
2010–2011	Ternana	43	(1)
2012	Como	3	(0)
Total		247	(4)
- * Club domestic league appearances and goals

Giuseppe Imburgia (born 1 May 1980) is a former Italian footballer who played the position of defender.

== Biography ==
Born in Saronno, in the Province of Varese, Lombardy, Imburgia started his career at Lombard club F.C. Internazionale Milano. In July 2000 half of the registration rights of Imburgia was sold to Cagliari as part of Fabio Macellari's deal. Full registration rights of Imburgia was "valued" for 4,000 million lire (€2,065,828). However injury made the deal collapsed. In January 2001 Imburgia was transferred to Swiss Italian club Bellinzona. In 2001 Imburgia was signed by Varese. In July 2002 Spezia signed Imburgia, Cordaz, Quadri, Stojkov and Pandev from Inter. In 2003 Imburgia was signed by Pro Patria where he played for 5 seasons.

In 2008, he was re-signed by Spezia (as new company since the old entity bankrupted). He won promotion back to fully professional league with the Serie D club. In July 2009 Spezia announced that Imburgia, Di Paola, Masi and Nieto would not return to the club.

Imburgia was signed by fellow fourth division club Monopoli in 2009. On 1 February 2010 Imburgia was signed by the third division club Ternana. Bizzarri (loan) and Angelucci were moved to opposite direction.

On 8 February 2012 Imburgia was signed by Como. Imburgia made his first start in the last round of the season, against Ternana as left midfielder.
