= Ljubiša Dunđerski =

Serbian footballer

Personal information
- Full name: Ljubiša Dunđerski
- Date of birth: 26 May 1972 (age 54)
- Place of birth: Doboj, SFR Yugoslavia
- Height: 1.84 m (6 ft 1/2 in)
- Position: Midfielder

Youth career
- Mladost Bački Jarak

Senior career*
Years	Team	Apps	(Gls)
1993–1997	Vojvodina	72	(3)
1994–1995	→ Borac Čačak (loan)	27	(0)
1997–2002	Atalanta	71	(3)
2001–2002	→ Como (loan)	20	(0)
2002–2004	Treviso	44	(3)
2004–2006	Vojvodina	30	(4)
2006–2008	Novi Sad	39	(3)
Total		303	(16)

International career
1997	FR Yugoslavia XI	1	(0)

Managerial career
- 2015: Vojvodina (sporting director)
- 2016: Spartak Subotica (sporting director)
- 2022–2023: Spartak Subotica
- 2025–2026: Vojvodina (assistant)
- 2026–: Bor (sports sector coordinator)
- * Club domestic league appearances and goals

Ljubiša Dunđerski (Serbian Cyrillic: Љубиша Дунђерски; born 26 May 1972) is a Serbian retired footballer who played as a midfielder.

== Playing career ==
Dunđerski made a name for himself at Vojvodina, before transferring to Atalanta in 1997. He spent seven years in Italy, also playing for Como and Treviso, before returning to Vojvodina in 2004. He played in one unofficial match for FR Yugoslavia, against a Hong Kong League XI at the 1997 Carlsberg Cup.

== Post-playing career ==
In 2015, Dunđerski served as the director of football at his former club Vojvodina.

On 18 December 2016, he became sports director of Spartak Subotica.

In August 2026, he became a sports sector coordinator of Bor.

== Personal life ==
His son David is a professional footballer who plays for Spartak Subotica.

== Managerial statistics ==
Team	From	To	Record				
Team	From	To	P	W	D	L	Win %
Spartak Subotica	9 September 2022	2023	16	4	4	8	25.00
Total			16	4	4	8	25.00
