= Mauro Bonomi =

Italian footballer

Personal information
- Date of birth: 23 August 1972 (age 54)
- Place of birth: Cremona, Italy
- Height: 1.83 m (6 ft 0 in)
- Position: Defender

Senior career*
| Years | Team | Apps | (Gls) |
| 1990–1992 | Cremonese | 49 | (0) |
| 1992–1995 | Lazio | 38 | (0) |
| 1995–1996 | Cagliari | 12 | (0) |
| 1996–1997 | Cesena | 34 | (0) |
| 1997 | Bologna | 1 | (0) |
| 1997–2001 | Torino | 103 | (3) |
| 2001–2004 | Napoli | 97 | (3) |
| 2004–2005 | Catanzaro | 18 | (0) |
| 2005–2006 | Ravenna | 20 | (0) |

International career
| 1989 | Italy U18 | 8 | (0) |
| 1991–1992 | Italy U21 | 12 | (0) |
- * Club domestic league appearances and goals

Mauro Bonomi (born 23 August 1972) is an Italian former footballer who played as a defender.

== Club career ==
Born in Cremona, Bonomi began his career playing in Serie B with Cremonese in 1990. The following year approach with grigiorossi in Serie A, where his debut on 1 September 1991 against the Ferraris in Genoa (2–0 for the griffins).

In 1992, he moved to Lazio, which began on August 26, 1992 against Ascoli (4–0 for the biancocelesti). After a few seasons by a holder in the rearguard of Lazio in 1994-95 did not find much space undici holder, accomplices of the explosion and Negro Nesta, and so he decided to move to Cagliari the following year.

The following year falls in Serie B with Cesena and in the summer of 1997 ritoena in the top flight, purchased from Bologna. However Emilian with only one lot quarrel before moving to Turin even in Serie B. In his third season with grenade conquest promotion in Serie A, but remains in B moving to Naples. Three seasons later, after the failure of Parthenopean who led the retocessione in Serie C1, went to Catanzaro. He ended his career at Ravenna in Serie C1 in 2006.

== International career ==
At international level, Bonomi represented the Italy under-21 side, making his debut in 1991 alongside his Cremonese teammate Dario Marcolin, and was a member of the team that won the UEFA European Under-21 Championship in 1992. He also played in the 1992 Olympic football tournament.

== Honours ==
Italy U21

- UEFA European Under-21 Championship: 1992
