= Christophe Sanchez =

French footballer (born 1972)

Personal information
- Date of birth: 4 October 1972 (age 54)
- Place of birth: Montpellier, France
- Height: 1.86 m (6 ft 1 in)
- Position: Forward

Senior career*
Years	Team	Apps	(Gls)
1992–1998	Montpellier	142	(37)
1998–2000	Bologna	6	(0)
2000–2003	Bordeaux	38	(3)
2000–2001	→ Saint-Étienne (loan)	27	(3)
2003	Venezia	9	(0)
2003–2004	FC Sète	13	(3)
Total		235	(46)
- * Club domestic league appearances and goals

Christophe Sanchez (born 4 October 1972) is a French former professional football who played as a forward. While at Bordeaux he played as a substitute as they won the 2002 Coupe de la Ligue Final.

== Personal life ==
Born in France, Sanchez is of Spanish descent.
