= SS Formia Calcio =

Italian football club

S.S.D. Insieme Formia
- Full name: Società Sportiva Dilettantistica Polisportiva Insieme Formia
- Nickname: Biancazzurri
- Founded: 1905
- Ground: Stadio Comunale di Maranola; Formia, Italy
- Capacity: 5,000
- Chairman: Alessandro Anelli
- Manager: Roberto Gioia
- League: Eccellenza Lazio
- 2021–22: Serie D, 15th
- Website: https://www.ssdinsiemeformia.com
Home colours	Away colours

S.S.D. Insieme Formia is an Italian association football club located in Formia, Lazio. Its official colours are white and blue and plays its home matches at the Stadio Comunale di Maranola (Formia) since 2015. The team previously played at Stadio Nicola Perrone. Currently the club plays in the Eccellenza amateur regional division. They most recently won the Coppa Italia Eccellenza Laziale in 2022–23.

== Honours ==
Serie D

- Champions (2): 1977–1978, 1989–1990
- Third Place (1): 1968-1969 (Girone F)

Promozione Lazio

- Champions (1): 2015–2016
- Runners-up (4): 1949-1950 (Girone I), 1954-1955 (Girone B), 1971-1972 (Girone B), 1987-1988 (Girone B)
- Third Place (1): 2018-2019 (Girone D)

Coppa Italia d'Eccellenza Lazio

- Champions (2): 2006–2007, 2022–2023

Campionato Nazionale Dilettanti

- Third Place: 1957-1958 (Girone B)

Coppa Italia Dilettanti

- Runners-up (1): 1985-1986

Other Championships Won (6)

- 1923–1924, 1947–1948, 1953–1954, 1963–1964, 1973–1974, 1984–1985

Highest Position Finished

- 7th in Serie C2 1992-1993
