= Marco Roccati =

Italian footballer

Personal information
- Date of birth: 1 July 1975 (age 51)
- Place of birth: Pinerolo, Italy
- Height: 1.96 m (6 ft 5 in)
- Position: Goalkeeper

Youth career
- 1993–1995: Ravenna

Senior career*
| Years | Team | Apps | (Gls) |
| 1995–1996 | Forlì | 29 | (0) |
| 1996–1997 | Ravenna | 2 | (0) |
| 1997–1998 | Empoli | 28 | (0) |
| 1998–2001 | Bologna | 0 | (0) |
| 1998–1999 | → Perugia (loan) | 10 | (0) |
| 1999–2000 | → Pistoiese (loan) | 5 | (0) |
| 2000–2001 | → Dundee (loan) | 19 | (0) |
| 2001–2002 | Napoli | 0 | (0) |
| 2002–2003 | Ancona | 0 | (0) |
| 2004–2006 | Fiorentina | 3 | (0) |
| 2006 | Ivrea | 8 | (0) |
| 2007 | Gallipoli | 0 | (0) |
| 2007–2008 | Canavese | 9 | (0) |
| Total | | 113 | (0) |
- * Club domestic league appearances and goals

Marco Roccati (born 1 July 1975 in Pinerolo, Province of Turin) is a retired Italian footballer who played as a goalkeeper.

Roccati spent the 2000–01 season on loan at Scottish club Dundee. In a Scottish Cup match against Hearts in February 2001 he saved a Colin Cameron penalty in a 1–1 draw.

== Honours ==
- UEFA Intertoto Cup: 1998
