= Nicola Boselli =

Italian footballer

Personal information
- Date of birth: 12 July 1972 (age 54)
- Place of birth: Lodi, Italy
- Height: 1.86 m (6 ft 1 in)
- Position: Defender

Senior career*
Years	Team	Apps	(Gls)
1990–1998	Atalanta	57	(1)
1992–1993	→ Leffe (loan)	25	(1)
1993	→ Ravenna (loan)	3	(0)
1998–2000	Bologna	19	(0)
2000–2003	Piacenza	44	(1)
2004–2006	Fanfulla	47	(3)
2006–2007	Brembio	22	(2)
2007–2008	Fanfulla	21	(0)
2008–2009	Sant'Angelo	23	(1)
Total		261	(9)
- * Club domestic league appearances and goals as of 11 November 2024

Nicola Boselli (born 12 July 1972), is an Italian former professional footballer who played as a defender.

== Career ==
Revealed by Atalanta BC, Boselli played his first game in Serie A at the end of the 1991–92 season. He had loan spells at SC Leffe and Ravenna the following season and returned to Atalanta, where he remained until 1997–98. He transferred to Bologna where he won the Intertoto Cup, and later also played for Piacenza. At the end of 2003, Boselli transferred to Fanfulla, which competed in the Eccellenza, where he was champion.

== Honours ==
Bologna

- UEFA Intertoto Cup: 1998

Fanfulla

- Eccellenza: 2004–05 (Lombardy, group A)
