= Fabio Macellari =

Italian footballer

Personal information
- Full name: Fabio Macellari
- Date of birth: 23 August 1974 (age 52)
- Place of birth: Sesto San Giovanni, Italy
- Height: 1.77 m (5 ft 10 in)
- Position: Left back

Team information
- Current team: Bobbiese

Youth career
- 1991–1992: Pro Sesto

Senior career*
Years	Team	Apps	(Gls)
1992–1994	Pro Sesto	38	(1)
1994–1997	U.S. Lecce	94	(4)
1997–2000	Cagliari	93	(4)
2000–2001	Internazionale	7	(0)
2001–2002	Bologna	10	(0)
2003–2004	Cagliari	29	(0)
2004	Pavia	11	(0)
2005	Triestina	17	(0)
2005	Lucchese	13	(0)
2006	Sangiovannese	12	(0)
2007–2008	Villasimius	?	(?)
2008–2009	Vado	?	(?)
2009	Loanesi	?	(?)
2009–2010	Finale	?	(?)
2010–2015	Bobbiese	?	(?)
- * Club domestic league appearances and goals

Fabio Macellari (born 23 August 1974 in Sesto San Giovanni) is an Italian former footballer who played as a defender for Bobbiese in Prima Categoria.

== Football career ==
Macellari started his career at Pro Sesto (Serie C1). He then signed by U.S. Lecce, at that time in Serie B. He followed the team to Serie C1 in summer 1995, but won the promotion to Serie A within the following two season.

In the 1997–98 season, he failed to taste the Serie A football, because he was transferred to Cagliari Calcio. But he finally tasted top division football in summer 1998.

He helped the club avoid relegation the following season, but not during the 1999–2000 season, although his performances still earned him a transfer to F.C. Internazionale Milano, in a cash-plus-player deal. Macellari was valued 14,500 million lire. (€7,488,625)

In June 2001, half of the registration rights of Macellari was signed by Bologna (Serie A) for 12,000 million lire (€6,197,483) However Inter paid the same amount to acquire half of Jonathan Binotto. Serious injury blocked Macellari to play for Bologna, so his contract was terminated in October 2002. Macellari then joined Cagliari (Serie B) in January 2003, played for one and a half season, won the promotion again.

=== Late career ===
After the second experience in Cagliari, he chose to play in lower leagues, joining the following teams: Pavia (Serie C1), Triestina (Serie B), Lucchese, Sangiovannese (Serie C1), Villasimius, Vado, Loanesi, Finale (Eccellenza) and U.S.Bobbiese (Prima Categoria).

== Honours ==
Lecce

- Serie B promotion as third place: 1996–97

Cagliari

- Serie B promotion as third place: 1997–98
- Serie B promotion as winner: 2003–04
