= Giacomo Cipriani =

Italian footballer

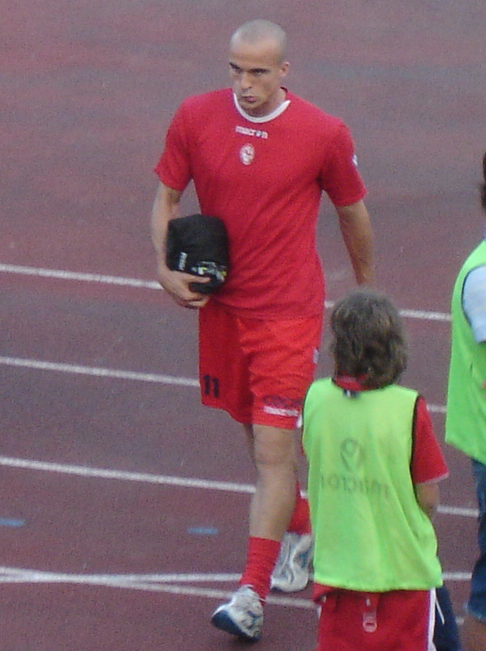

Personal information
- Date of birth: 28 October 1980 (age 46)
- Place of birth: Bologna, Italy
- Height: 1.86 m (6 ft 1 in)
- Position: Striker

Senior career*
Years	Team	Apps	(Gls)
1999–2008	Bologna	66	(9)
2000	→ Lecce (loan)	8	(0)
2003	→ Piacenza (loan)	20	(3)
2004	→ Sampdoria (loan)	18	(2)
2008	→ Avellino (loan)	17	(2)
2008–2009	Rimini	26	(5)
2009–2011	SPAL	46	(22)
2011–2013	Benevento	19	(4)
2013–2014	Ascoli	7	(1)
2014–2015	Savoia	13	(1)

International career
1998	Italy U17	4	(0)
1998	Italy U18	2	(1)
2000	Italy U20	4	(1)
1999–2001	Italy U21	4	(2)
- * Club domestic league appearances and goals

Giacomo Cipriani (born 28 October 1980) is an Italian former footballer who played as a forward.

== Football career ==
Cipriani started his career at Bologna. His impression in youth national teams led Juventus to buy half of his registration rights in 2000 for 4.5 billion lire (€2.324M), Alex Pederzoli (€516,457 or 1 million lire) and Alessandro Gamberini (€2.324M for 50% rights or 4.5 billion lire), and Cipriani and Gamberini remained on loan at Bologna as part of Jonatan Binotto's permanent deal for 10 billion lire (€5.16 million).

After consecutive loans to Piacenza and Sampdoria in 2003–04 season, Bologna bought back Cipriani from Juventus for €417,000 and signed a contract extension in September 2004, into 30 June 2007.

In January 2008, Cipriani was loaned again, this time to Serie B's Avellino.

In July 2008 he agreed a one-year deal with Rimini. He left the club in June 2009 after Rimini went relegated to Lega Pro Prima Divisione. He then stayed without a team until October 2009, when he was announced as being signed by Lega Pro Prima Divisione club SPAL 1907 in a free transfer. He then left SPAL in 2011 to join Benevento, but managed to make just 19 appearances in two seasons at the club. Another unimpressive season at financially stricken Lega Pro Prima Divisione club Ascoli followed, with just seven appearances and a spare goal.

On 4 September 2014, he signed a contract for newly promoted Lega Pro club Savoia.
