= Jonatan Binotto =

Italian former footballer

Personal information
- Full name: Jonatan Binotto
- Date of birth: 22 January 1975 (age 51)
- Place of birth: Montebelluna, Italy
- Height: 1.82 m (6 ft 0 in)
- Position: Midfielder

Youth career
- 1991–1993: Juventus

Senior career*
Years	Team	Apps	(Gls)
1993–1998	Juventus	0	(0)
1994–1995	→ Ascoli (loan)	28	(4)
1995–1996	→ Cesena (loan)	32	(4)
1996–1998	→ Verona (loan)	38	(6)
1998–2001	Bologna	62	(4)
2001–2004	Internazionale	0	(0)
2001–2002	→ Chievo (loan)	5	(0)
2002	→ Brescia (loan)	11	(0)
2002–2003	→ Como (loan)	28	(0)
2004–2005	Bologna	9	(0)
2005	Pistoiese	14	(0)
2006	Triestina	1	(0)
2006–2007	Casalecchio		

International career
1994–1996	Italy U-21	8	(2)

Managerial career
- 2007–2008: Sasso Marconi
- 2018–2019: Casalecchio
- 2024: Alessandria
- * Club domestic league appearances and goals

Jonatan Binotto (born 22 January 1975) is an Italian former footballer who played as a midfielder.

== Playing career ==
=== Early career ===
Binotto started his professional career in 1993 at Juventus. He spent two seasons on loan at Serie B clubs, before joining Hellas Verona, who were in Serie A at that time. He struggled to break into the first team, however, and remained with the team until the club's relegation in the summer of 1997.

=== Bologna ===
He then joined Bologna in the summer of 1998 in a co-ownership deal, for 150 million lire, where he played 62 Serie A games in three seasons. In May 2000, Bologna bought Binotto outright for 10 billion lire, but in pure player swap, and Bologna bought back most of the players for free, made the deal purely financial tricks. (Note: 9,850 million lire excess the original fee in 1998, or €5.087 million; 1 euro = 1936.27 lire. It made Juventus had a financial income of €5.087 million but counter-weight by the signing of Alessandro Gamberini (50% for €2.324 million or 4.5 billion lire), Giacomo Cipriani (50% for €2.324 million) and Alex Pederzoli (50% for about €516,000 or 1 billion lire) in co-ownership deal (10 billion lire in total), all would create amortisation cost in instalments. Moreover, only Pederzoli actually joined Juventus.)

=== Internazionale ===
He was signed by Internazionale in June 2001, in a co-ownership deal, in exchange for Fabio Macellari, who went to Bologna. Both Binotto and Macellari were "valued" at 12 billion lire (€6,197,483).

He was immediately loaned out to Chievo, Brescia and Como.

=== Later career ===
Binotto returned to Bologna in January 2004, after the co-ownership deal was terminated ca. January 2003, but not until the summer of 2004 was he included in the team again. He then played for Pistoiese and Triestina in the 2005–06 season, and Casalecchio of Eccellenza in the 2006–07 season.

== Coaching career ==
Binotto started his coaching career in 2007 at amateur club Sasso Marconi, then working as an assistant at professional clubs such as SPAL and Bologna. He also briefly worked as a head coach for Casalecchio from 2018 to 2019.

In 2022, Binotto joined Marco Banchini as an assistant at Montevarchi, then following him at Alessandria the following year.

On 17 March 2024, following the dismissal of Banchini, Binotto was promoted head coach of Alessandria in the Serie C league.
