= Alex Brunner =

Italian footballer (born 1973)

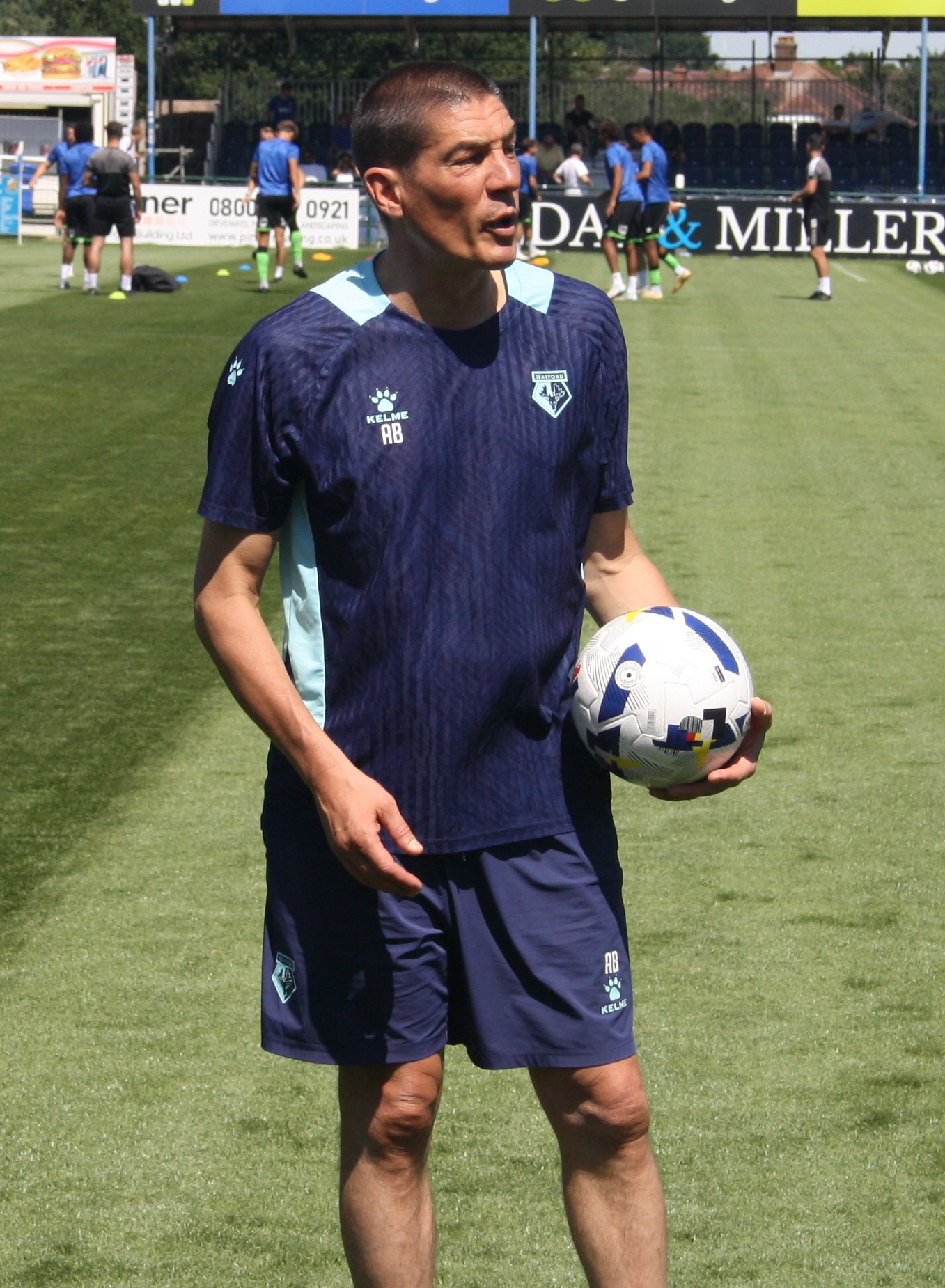
- Alex Brunner in 2025.

Personal information
- Date of birth: 8 December 1973 (age 52)
- Place of birth: Trieste, Italy
- Height: 1.87 m (6 ft 2 in)
- Position: Goalkeeper

Youth career
- ?–1993: Triestina

Senior career*
Years	Team	Apps	(Gls)
1991–1993	Triestina	5	(0)
1993–1994	Formia	24	(0)
1994–1996	Foggia	39	(0)
1996–1999	Bologna	6	(0)
1999–2003	Como	125	(0)
2003–2004	Ternana	37	(0)
2004–2005	Salernitana	11	(0)
2005	→ Cagliari (loan)	1	(0)
2005–2007	Lucchese	64	(0)
2007–2008	Sorrento	34	(0)
2008–2009	Juve Stabia	20	(0)
2009–2010	Itala San Marco	3	(0)
Total		369	(0)
- * Club domestic league appearances and goals

Alex Brunner (born 8 December 1973) is an Italian former footballer who played as a goalkeeper. He currently works as a goalkeeping coach.

== Football career ==
=== Early career ===
Brunner started his career at hometown club Triestina. After the club were relegated to Serie C1 in the summer of 1991, Brunner gained his place in first team, making five appearances for the club in two Serie C1 seasons. In the summer of 1993, he moved to Formia of Serie C2, where he first became a regular starter.

=== Foggia & Bologna ===
Brunner joined Foggia of Serie A in 1994, starting his career as a backup keeper for several Serie A clubs. In his first season with the team, he just made two appearances, as second-choice goalkeeper behind Francesco Mancini; after the club suffered relegation, he became a regular starter once again.

In summer 1996, Brunner joined newly promoted Serie A team Bologna. He spent three seasons at the club, and made six appearances in Serie A, as second-choice goalkeeper behind Francesco Antonioli.

=== Como ===
He transferred to Como in June 1999, where he spent four seasons. In his first season with the club, Como just finished tenth in Serie C1, but in the second and third seasons, he helped the team to obtain consecutive promotions to Serie B and subsequently Serie A, which was also aided by the signing of new club president Enrico Preziosi. In the 2002–03 Serie A season, he competed with experienced Fabrizio Ferron for a starting spot, but still made 21 appearances for Como.

=== Return to Serie B ===
After Como finished bottom of the table and suffered relegation to Serie B, Brunner transferred to Ternana, replacing Sergio Marcon and Gianmatteo Mareggini, who had recently been released the club. Brunner played ahead of Tommaso Berni as the club's first choice keeper, and Ternana finished seventh that season.

Brunner left for Salernitana in July 2004, where he competed for a starting spot with former first-choice keeper Domenico Botticella. In January 2005, he left for Cagliari of Serie A, as the club's second-choice keeper (replacing the recently departed Fanis Katergiannakis), behind Gennaro Iezzo and ahead of Luca Tomasig (who replaced the recently departed Davide Capello).

=== Return to Lega Pro ===
After the bankruptcy of Salernitana, Brunner returned to Serie C1 side Lucchese in 2005, on a free transfer. He was the club's first choice keeper ahead of Mathieu Moreau, Michele Tambellini and Paolo Castelli. In June 2007, he joined Sorrento of Serie C1. In the next season, he left for Juve Stabia of Lega Pro Prima Divisione on a two-year contract, where he was the first choice, until he was released in March and replaced by Salvatore Soviero. In October 2009, he left for Itala San Marco of Lega Pro Seconda Divisione. Brunner, along with Marcon, served as the backup of young keeper Omar Tusini.

== Coaching career ==
After Itala San Marco were expelled from professional league, Brunner returned to Como in the 2009–10 season as an assistant goalkeeping coach (Italian: preparatore dei portieri), under Ottavio Strano, who was both the club's main goalkeeping coach (Italian: Allenatore portieri), and the team's head coach, along with Oscar Brevi. On 18 June, his contract was renewed for another year. Brunner spent seven years as goalkeeper coach at Udinese, before joining Watford in 2022.

== Honours ==
Como

- Serie B: 2001–02
