= Michele Paramatti =

Italian footballer

Personal information
- Full name: Michele Andrea Paramatti
- Date of birth: 10 March 1968 (age 58)
- Place of birth: Salara, Italy
- Height: 1.81 m (5 ft 11 in)
- Position: Defender

Senior career*
Years	Team	Apps	(Gls)
1986–1995	SPAL	150	(6)
1987–1989	→ Russi (loan)	47	(7)
1995–2000	Bologna	135	(14)
2000–2002	Juventus	26	(0)
2002–2003	Bologna	30	(1)
2003–2004	Reggiana	25	(1)
Total		413	(29)
- * Club domestic league appearances and goals

Michele Paramatti (born 10 March 1968) is an Italian former professional footballer who played as a defender.

== Career ==
Paramatti was born in Salara. He began his career with SPAL in 1986 in the lower divisions of the Italian football league, spending nine seasons with the club in total, including a two-year loan period with Russi between 1987 and 1989.

A free agent at the age of 27, in 1995, he was signed by Bologna at the request of the club's sporting director at the time, Gabriele Oriali; Paramatti would make a name for himself with the club due to his consistent performances, eventually being named Bologna's captain. During his first season with the club, he helped Bologna to obtain Serie A promotion, winning the 1995–96 Serie B title. During the 1997–98 season under manager Renzo Ulivieri, he played alongside several notable players, such as Roberto Baggio, Giancarlo Marocchi, Igor Kolyvanov, and Kennet Andersson, helping Bologna to qualify for the 1998 UEFA Intertoto Cup. Bologna won the tournament the following season under Carlo Mazzone, qualifying for the 1998–99 UEFA Cup; the club would go on to reach the semi-finals of the competition, with Paramatti scoring in the return leg against Olympique Marseille. That season, the club also managed a semi-final finish in the Coppa Italia.

After 5 seasons with the club, he was acquired by Juventus in 2000; during his final press conference with Bologna, an emotional Paramatti thanked the club's fans, stating: "I cannot forget them because they always showed great support. I am proud to have worn the Bologna shirt and I thank everyone: but this is a see you later, because five years are impossible to forget". With the Turin club, he made his Champions League debut under Carlo Ancelotti; he also made 10 appearances under Marcello Lippi during the 2001–02 season, which saw the club crowned Serie A champions, also reaching the Coppa Italia Final.

In the summer of 2002, as originally promised, he returned to Bologna for one more season, after spending two seasons in Turin. He ended his career in 2004, after one season with Serie C1 side Reggiana.

== Style of play ==
A hard-working, and ambidextrous full-back, Paramatti was usually deployed as a left-back, but was capable of playing on either side of the defence. Due to his tactical versatility, he was able to adapt to many different playing positions across the pitch, and had the capacity to play anywhere in defence or in midfield, due to his ability to time his runs and challenges. Throughout his career, he was also used as a centre-back, as a wide, defensive, or central midfielder, and even in more offensive roles, as a winger or as a forward on rare occasions, in particular due to his ability in the air, which made him a goal threat in the penalty area on indirect set-pieces. Due to his stamina, work-rate, and consistency, he was capable of aiding his team both offensively and defensively, and he excelled in particular as an attacking wing-back on the left flank.

== Personal life ==
Michele 's son, Lorenzo, is also professional footballer, who made his professional debut in 2015.

== Honours ==
Bologna

- Serie B: 1995–96
- UEFA Intertoto Cup: 1998

Juventus

- Serie A: 2001–02
