= 1999–2000 UC Sampdoria season =

Sampdoria
1999–2000 season
- President: Enrico Mantovani
- Manager: Gian Piero Ventura
- Stadium: Stadio Luigi Ferraris
- Serie B: 5th
- Coppa Italia: Second round
- Top goalscorer: League: Davide Dionigi (8); All: Francesco Flachi (11)
Home colours	Away colours	Third colours

The 1999–2000 UC Sampdoria season saw the club finish 5th in Serie B, a point away from promotion.

== Kit ==
Sampdoria's kit was manufactured by Japanese company Asics and sponsored by Japanese gaming company Sega, who used their sponsorship to promote their console Dreamcast.

== Players ==
=== First-team squad ===
Squad at end of season

Note: Flags indicate national team as defined under FIFA eligibility rules; some limited exceptions apply. Players may hold more than one non-FIFA nationality.

No.	Pos.	Nation	Player
1	GK	ITA	Matteo Sereni
2	DF	URU	Damián Macaluso
3	DF	POR	Hugo
4	DF	ITA	Alessandro Grandoni
4	MF	ITA	Lussjen Corti
5	DF	ITA	Marcello Castellini
6	DF	ITA	Vittorio Tosto
7	MF	ITA	Gaetano Vasari
8	FW	BRA	Catê
9	DF	ITA	Emanuele Pesaresi
10	FW	ITA	Francesco Flachi
11	FW	ITA	Francesco Palmieri
12	GK	ITA	Luca Fuselli
13	MF	ITA	Marco Sgrò
14	MF	ITA	Simone Sinagra
14	MF	CMR	Francis Zé
15	MF	ITA	Simone Vergassola

No.	Pos.	Nation	Player
16	MF	ITA	Vincenzo Iacopino
17	MF	BRA	Doriva
18	MF	YUG	Bratislav Živković
19	MF	ITA	Stefano Casale
20	FW	YUG	Zoran Jovičić
21	MF	ITA	Fabrizio Ficini
22	GK	ITA	Marco Ambrosio
22	GK	ITA	Federico Bigliazzi
23	MF	ITA	Emanuele Matzuzzi
24	GK	ITA	Christian Puggioni
24	FW	BRA	Paco Soares
25	DF	YUG	Nenad Sakić
26	FW	ITA	Carmine Esposito
27	MF	ITA	Guglielmo Stendardo
28	MF	ITA	Marco Sanna
30	FW	ITA	Davide Dionigi

=== Transfers ===
In
Pos.	Name	from	Type
FW	Francesco Flachi	Fiorentina	
MF	Carmine Esposito	Fiorentina	
DF	Damián Macaluso	Racing Montevideo	
GK	Matteo Sereni	Empoli FC	loan ended
DF	Vittorio Tosto	Salernitana	
MF	Gaetano Vasari	Cagliari	
MF	Stefano Casale	US Lecce	
DF	Emanuele Pesaresi	Napoli	loan ended

Out
Pos.	Name	To	Type
DF	Moreno Mannini	Nottingham Forest	
FW	Vincenzo Montella	AS Roma	
FW	Ariel Ortega	Parma	
GK	Fabrizio Ferron	Internazionale	
MF	Fabio Pecchia	Torino	
MF	Pierre Laigle	Lyon	
DF	Saliou Lassissi	Parma	loan ended
MF	Lee Sharpe	Bradford City	loan
DF	Stefano Nava	Pro Sesto	
MF	Paco Soares	Carrarese	
DF	David Balleri	US Lecce	
DF	Marco Franceschetti	Hellas Verona	

==== Winter ====
In
Pos.	Name	from	Type
FW	Davide Dionigi	Piacenza	

Out
Pos.	Name	To	Type
GK	Marco Ambrosio	Lucchese	
DF	Alessandro Grandoni	Torino	loan
FW	Catê	Flamengo	

== Competitions ==
=== Serie B ===
==== League table ====
Pos	Team	Pld	W	D	L	GF	GA	GD	Pts	Promotion or relegation
3	Atalanta (P)	38	17	12	9	51	34	+17	63	Promotion to Serie A
4	Brescia (P)	38	16	15	7	54	38	+16	63	Promotion to Serie A
5	Sampdoria	38	17	11	10	45	40	+5	62	
6	Genoa	38	16	9	13	51	42	+9	57	
7	Salernitana	38	14	10	14	55	61	−6	52	

Source: Almanacco Illustrato del Calcio - La Storia 1898-2004, Panini Edizioni, Modena, September 2005
Rules for classification: 1) points; 2) head-to-head points; 3) head-to-head goal difference; 4) head-to-head goals scored; 5) goal difference; 6) number of goals scored.
(P) Promoted

==== Results summary ====
Overall								Home						Away					
Pld	W	D	L	GF	GA	GD	Pts	W	D	L	GF	GA	GD	W	D	L	GF	GA	GD
38	11	16	11	45	47	−2	49	7	10	2	27	20	+7	4	6	9	18	27	−9

Source: Worldfootball

==== Results by round ====
Round	1	2	3	4	5	6	7	8	9	10	11	12	13	14	15	16	17	18	19	20	21	22	23	24	25	26	27	28	29	30	31	32	33	34	35	36	37	38
Ground	A	H	H	A	H	A	H	A	H	A	A	H	A	H	A	H	A	H	A	H	A	A	H	A	H	A	H	A	H	H	A	H	A	H	A	H	A	H
Result	W	D	L	W	W	D	W	D	D	D	D	L	W	L	W	D	L	D	W	W	W	D	W	W	W	D	L	L	L	D	L	L	W	L	W	W	W	W
Position	1	2	8	5	4	3	3	3	3	4	4	6	5	6	5	5	5	5	5	4	2	3	2	2	1	2	2	3	4	4	5	5	5	5	5	5	5	5

Source: Competitive matches
A = Away; H = Home; W = Win; D = Draw; L = Loss; = Leader, Serie A; = Promoted to 2000–01 Serie A; = Relegation to 2000–01 Serie C1

==== Matches ====
29 August 1999 1	Pistoiese	0–1	Sampdoria	Pistoia
			Palmieri 20'	Stadium: Stadio Comunale; Referee: Pasquale Rodomonti

5 September 1999 2	Sampdoria	0–0	Brescia	Genoa
				Stadium: Stadio Luigi Ferraris; Attendance: 16,536; Referee: Fiorenzo Treossi

12 September 1999 3	Empoli	1–0	Sampdoria	Empoli
	Di Natale 22'			Stadium: Stadio Carlo Castellani; Referee: Roberto Rosetti

19 September 1999 4	Sampdoria	2–1	Ravenna	Genoa
	Palmieri 45'; Pesaresi 90+5'		Dell'Anno 19' (pen.)	Stadium: Stadio Luigi Ferraris; Attendance: 14,667; Referee: Danilo Nucini

26 September 1999 5	Cosenza	1–2	Sampdoria	Cosenza
	Biagioni 75'		C. Esposito 51'; Vergassola 77'	Stadium: Stadio San Vito; Referee: Domenico Messina

3 October 1999 6	Sampdoria	2–2	Ternana	Genoa
	C. Esposito 14', 71'		Artico 43'; Ginestra 80'	Stadium: Stadio Luigi Ferraris; Attendance: 16,576; Referee: Angelo Bonfrisco

10 October 1999 7	Sampdoria	1–0	Atalanta	Genoa
	Vasari 57'			Stadium: Stadio Luigi Ferraris; Attendance: 18,394; Referee: Alberto Castellani

24 October 1999 8	Genoa	1–1	Sampdoria	Genoa
	Ruotolo 87'		Castellini 44'	Stadium: Stadio Luigi Ferraris; Referee: Livio Bazzoli

31 October 1999 9	Sampdoria	0–0	Chievo	Cremona
				Stadium: Stadio Giovanni Zini; Attendance: 12,997; Referee: Stefano Cassarà

7 November 1999 10	Salernitana	1–1	Sampdoria	Salerno
	Melosi 70'		Flachi 26'	Stadium: Stadio Arechi; Referee: Alberto Castellani

14 November 1999 11	Sampdoria	1–1	Cesena	Cremona
	C. Esposito 36'		Campedelli 35'	Stadium: Stadio Giovanni Zini; Attendance: 13,378; Referee: Nicola Ayroldi

21 November 1999 12	Napoli	1–0	Sampdoria	Naples
	Schwoch 9'			Stadium: Stadio San Paolo; Referee: Pasquale Rodomonti

28 November 1999 13	Sampdoria	2–0	Treviso	Cremona
	Doriva 16'; Casale 90+2'			Stadium: Stadio Giovanni Zini; Attendance: 13,312; Referee: Luciano Fausti

5 December 1999 14	Vicenza	2–1	Sampdoria	Vicenza
	Comandini 62'; Luiso 90+3'		Casale 18'	Stadium: Stadio Romeo Menti; Referee: Daniele Tombolini

12 December 1999 15	Sampdoria	2–1	Pescara	Genoa
	Palmieri 22'; Sakić 65'		Gelsi 39'	Stadium: Stadio Luigi Ferraris; Attendance: 13,090; Referee: Nicola Ayroldi

19 December 1999 16	Monza	1–1	Sampdoria	Monza
	Vignaroli 84'		Vergassola 38'	Stadium: Stadio Brianteo; Referee: Pierluigi Collina

6 January 2000 17	Savoia	1–0	Sampdoria	Torre Annunziata
	Briano 67'			Stadium: Stadio Alfredo Giraud; Referee: Livio Bazzoli

9 January 2000 18	Sampdoria	1–1	Fermana	Genoa
	C. Esposito 38'		Pagani 90'	Stadium: Stadio Luigi Ferraris; Attendance: 15,533; Referee: Riccardo Pirrone

16 January 2000 19	Alzano Virescit	0–1	Sampdoria	Bergamo
			Dionigi 72'	Stadium: Stadio Atleti Azzurri d'Italia; Referee: Paolo Bertini

23 January 2000 20	Sampdoria	1–0	Pistoiese	Genoa
	Dionigi 64'			Stadium: Stadio Luigi Ferraris; Attendance: 15,877; Referee: Francesco Strazzera

30 January 2000 21	Brescia	0–1	Sampdoria	Brescia
			Dionigi 72'	Stadium: Stadio Mario Rigamonti; Referee: Danilo Nucini

13 February 2000 22	Sampdoria	1–1	Empoli	Genoa
	Palmieri 86'		Saudati 58'	Stadium: Stadio Luigi Ferraris; Attendance: 16,595; Referee: Riccardo Pirrone

20 February 2000 23	Ravenna	0–1	Sampdoria	Ravenna
			Casale 30'	Stadium: Stadio Bruno Benelli; Referee: Tarcisio Serena

27 February 2000 24	Sampdoria	2–0	Cosenza	Genoa
	Palmieri 29' (pen.); Dionigi 73'			Stadium: Stadio Luigi Ferraris; Attendance: 15,478; Referee: Lorenzo Branzoni

5 March 2000 25	Ternana	0–1	Sampdoria	Terni
			Dionigi 55'	Stadium: Stadio Libero Liberati; Referee: Andrea Guiducci

12 March 2000 26	Atalanta	3–3	Sampdoria	Bergamo
	Caccia 47'; Pinardi 87'; F. Rossini 90+3'		Vergassola 4'; Dionigi 55'; Doriva 75'	Stadium: Stadio Atleti Azzurri d'Italia; Referee: Stefano Farina

19 March 2000 27	Sampdoria	0–1	Genoa	Genoa
			Carparelli 57'	Stadium: Stadio Luigi Ferraris; Attendance: 37,048; Referee: Domenico Messina

26 March 2000 28	Chievo	3–2	Sampdoria	Verona
	Conteh 5'; Marazzina 30'; Lanna 74'		Vasari 58'; Jovičić 75'	Stadium: Stadio Marcantonio Bentegodi; Referee: Paolo Bertini

2 April 2000 29	Sampdoria	2–4	Salernitana	Genoa
	Dionigi 51'; Casale 52'		Di Michele 8', 35'; Vannucchi 16', 80' (pen.)	Stadium: Stadio Luigi Ferraris; Attendance: 17,124; Referee: Massimiliano Saccani

9 April 2000 30	Cesena	0–0	Sampdoria	Cesena
				Stadium: Stadio Dino Manuzzi; Referee: Gianluca Paparesta

22 April 2000 31	Sampdoria	0–2	Napoli	Genoa
			Asta 42'; Schwoch 69' (pen.)	Stadium: Stadio Luigi Ferraris; Attendance: 21,510; Referee: Stefano Braschi

30 April 2000 32	Treviso	1–0	Sampdoria	Treviso
	Ballarin 80'			Stadium: Stadio Omobono Tenni; Referee: Alberto Castellani

7 May 2000 33	Sampdoria	3–1	Vicenza	Genoa
	Palmieri 60'; Vasari 65'; Flachi 90'		Bucchi 87'	Stadium: Stadio Luigi Ferraris; Attendance: 15,410; Referee: Fiorenzo Treossi

14 May 2000 34	Pescara	4–0	Sampdoria	Pescara
	M. Rossi 12', 37'; Gelsi 43'; Sullo 87'			Stadium: Stadio Adriatico; Referee: Stefano Farina

21 May 2000 35	Sampdoria	2–1	Monza	Genoa
	Castorina 24' (o.g.); Flachi 84'		Lantignotti 58'	Stadium: Stadio Luigi Ferraris; Attendance: 13,647; Referee: Livio Bazzoli

28 May 2000 36	Sampdoria	2–1	Savoia	Genoa
	Flachi 11'; Vergassola 60'		Tisci 73'	Stadium: Stadio Luigi Ferraris; Attendance: 14,013; Referee: Francesco Strazzera

4 June 2000 37	Fermana	1–2	Sampdoria	Fermo
	Di Fabio 9'		Dionigi 58'; Doriva 88'	Stadium: Stadio Bruno Recchioni; Referee: Gianluca Paparesta

11 June 2000 38	Sampdoria	3–2	Alzano Virescit	Genoa
	Jovičić 13'; Flachi 30' (pen.); Vasari 67' (pen.)		G. Ferrari 76'; Florjančič 87'	Stadium: Stadio Luigi Ferraris; Attendance: 14,318; Referee: Cosimo Bolognino

=== Coppa Italia ===
==== Group stage (Group 2) ====
Pos	Team	Pld	W	D	L	GF	GA	GD	Pts
1	Sampdoria (B)	6	5	0	1	13	5	+8	15
2	Cesena (B)	6	3	2	1	8	6	+2	11
3	Palermo (C1B)	6	1	2	3	10	14	−4	5
4	Savoia(B)	6	0	2	4	5	11	−6	2

15 August 1999 1	Savoia	1–3	Sampdoria	Torre Annunziata
	Battaglia 30' (pen.)		Flachi 5', 22'; Palmieri 61'	Stadium: Stadio Alfredo Giraud; Referee: Gianluca Paparesta

18 August 1999 2	Sampdoria	4–1	Palermo	Genoa
	Doriva 22'; Flachi 45+1', 49'; Palmieri 76' (pen.)		Lorenzini 79'	Stadium: Stadio Luigi Ferraris; Referee: Angelo Bonfrisco

22 August 1999 3	Cesena	0–1	Sampdoria	Cesena
			Flachi 24'	Stadium: Stadio Dino Manuzzi; Referee: Salvatore Racalbuto

25 August 1999 4	Sampdoria	1–2	Cesena	Genoa
	Palmieri 74' (pen.)		Campedelli 24'; Barollo 83'	Stadium: Stadio Luigi Ferraris; Referee: Roberto Rosetti

1 September 1999 5	Sampdoria	1–0	Savoia	Genoa
	Caté 64'			Stadium: Stadio Luigi Ferraris; Referee: Stefano Cassarà

15 September 1999 6	Palermo	1–3	Sampdoria	Palermo
	Barraco 67'		Pesaresi 30'; Flachi 59'; Vasari 79'	Stadium: Stadio La Favorita; Referee: Emilio Pellegrino

==== Second round ====
12 October 1999 First leg	Sampdoria	0–2	Bologna	Genoa
			K. Andersson 8'	Stadium: Stadio Luigi Ferraris; Referee: Roberto Rosetti

26 October 1999 Second leg	Bologna	2–0 (4–0 agg.)	Sampdoria	Bologna
	Ventola 4'; Ingesson 82' (pen.)			Stadium: Stadio Renato Dall'Ara; Referee: Gennaro Borriello

== Statistics ==
=== Players statistics ===
No.	Pos	Nat	Player	Total		Serie A		Coppa	
No.	Pos	Nat	Player	Apps	Goals	Apps	Goals	Apps	Goals
1	GK	(Italy) ITA	Matteo Sereni	37	-38	37	-38		
5	DF	(Italy) ITA	Marcello Castellini	26	1	26	1		
3	DF	(Portugal) POR	Hugo	25	0	16+9	0		
25	DF	(Federal Republic of Yugoslavia) YUG	Nenad Sakić	35	1	35	1		
19	MF	(Italy) ITA	Stefano Casale	38	4	32+6	4		
21	MF	(Italy) ITA	Fabrizio Ficini	36	0	36	0		
15	MF	(Italy) ITA	Simone Vergassola	35	0	32+3	0		
7	MF	(Italy) ITA	Gaetano Vasari	35	4	35	4		
17	MF	(Brazil) BRA	Doriva	37	3	36+1	3		
30	FW	(Italy) ITA	Davide Dionigi	20	8	18+2	8		
11	FW	(Italy) ITA	Francesco Palmieri	31	6	31	6		
22	GK	(Italy) ITA	Bigliazzi	1	-2	1	-2		
9	DF	(Italy) ITA	Emanuele Pesaresi	17	1	14+3	1		
26	FW	(Italy) ITA	Carmine Esposito	24	5	13+11	5		
6	DF	(Italy) ITA	Vittorio Tosto	19	0	13+6	0		
10	FW	(Italy) ITA	Francesco Flachi	28	5	12+16	5		
13	MF	(Italy) ITA	Marco Sgrò	27	0	9+18	0		
28	MF	(Italy) ITA	Marco Sanna	16	0	5+11	0		
18	MF	(Federal Republic of Yugoslavia) YUG	Bratislav Živković	17	0	4+13	0		
27	MF	(Italy) ITA	Guglielmo Stendardo	6	0	3+3	0		
20	FW	(Federal Republic of Yugoslavia) YUG	Zoran Jovičić	9	2	2+7	2		
23	MF	(Italy) ITA	Emanuele Matzuzzi	4	0	0+4	0		
8	FW	(Brazil) BRA	Caté	2	0	0+2	0		
4	DF	(Italy) ITA	Alessandro Grandoni	1	0	0+1	0		
24	GK	(Italy) ITA	Christian Puggioni	0	0	0	0		
22	GK	(Italy) ITA	Marco Ambrosio	0	0	0	0		
2	DF	(Uruguay) URU	Damián Macaluso	0	0	0	0		
16	MF	(Italy) ITA	Vincenzo Iacopino	0	0	0	0		
4	MF	(Italy) ITA	Lussjen Corti						
12	GK	(Italy) ITA	Luca Fuselli						
14	MF	(Italy) ITA	Simone Sinagra						
14	MF	(Cameroon) CMR	Francis Zé						
24	FW	(Brazil) BRA	Paco Soares						

- Source: http://calcio-seriea.net/presenze/1999/2885/
