= 1998–99 UC Sampdoria season =

Sampdoria
1998–99 season
- President: Enrico Mantovani
- Manager: Luciano Spalletti (until 13 December 1998); David Platt (from 14 December 1998 until 31 January 1999); Luciano Spalletti (from 2 February 1999)
- Stadium: Stadio Luigi Ferraris
- Serie A: 16th (relegated)
- Coppa Italia: Round of 16
- UEFA Intertoto Cup: Fourth round
- Top goalscorer: League: Vincenzo Montella (12); All: Vincenzo Montella (16)
Home colours	Away colours	Third colours

The 1998–99 UC Sampdoria season ended with the club's relegation to Serie B just eight years after winning the Serie A title in 1990–91. Similarly to Napoli the year prior, the club was no longer a financial power when it came to signing players, while its high-profile signing, Ariel Ortega, did not deliver to the degree Sampdoria had hoped for.

== Squad ==
Note: Flags indicate national team as defined under FIFA eligibility rules; some limited exceptions apply. Players may hold more than one non-FIFA nationality.

No.	Pos.	Nation	Player
1	GK	ITA	Fabrizio Ferron
2	DF	ITA	Marcello Castellini
3	DF	ITA	Stefano Nava
4	MF	ITA	Marco Franceschetti
5	DF	ITA	Moreno Mannini
6	DF	ITA	David Balleri
7	DF	ITA	Emanuele Pesaresi
7	MF	ITA	Fabio Pecchia
8	MF	FRA	Pierre Laigle
9	FW	ITA	Vincenzo Montella
10	FW	ARG	Ariel Ortega
11	FW	ITA	Francesco Palmieri
12	GK	ITA	Luca Fuselli
13	MF	YUG	Bratislav Živković
14	MF	ITA	Vincenzo Iacopino
15	DF	POR	Hugo

No.	Pos.	Nation	Player
16	MF	ARG	Fernando Gastón Córdoba
17	FW	BRA	Catê
18	MF	ITA	Marco Sgrò
19	MF	ITA	Simone Vergassola
20	FW	YUG	Zoran Jovičić
21	MF	ITA	Matteo Solari
22	GK	ITA	Marco Ambrosio
23	DF	ITA	Alessandro Grandoni
24	DF	CIV	Saliou Lassissi
25	DF	YUG	Nenad Sakić
26	MF	ITA	Fabrizio Ficini
28	MF	ITA	Guglielmo Stendardo
29	DF	ITA	Giovanni Piredda
30	FW	ITA	Simone Aloe
31	MF	ENG	Lee Sharpe
32	MF	BRA	Doriva

=== Transfers ===
In
Pos.	Name	from	Type
FW	Ariel Ortega	Valencia	
FW	Francesco Palmieri	US Lecce	
DF	Nenad Sakić	US Lecce	
DF	Alessandro Grandoni	SS Lazio	
MF	Bratislav Živković	Crvena Zvezda	
FW	Zoran Jovičić	Crvena Zvezda	
MF	Vincenzo Iacopino	Hellas Verona	loan ended
MF	Gastón Córdoba	Racing Club	
FW	Catê	Universidad Catolica	

Out
Pos.	Name	To	Type
MF	Juan Sebastián Verón	Parma F.C.	
MF	Alain Boghossian	Parma F.C.	
DF	Siniša Mihajlović	S.S. Lazio	
FW	Giuseppe Signori	Bologna F.C.	loan ended
MF	Fausto Salsano	Spezia Calcio	
FW	François Omam-Biyik	Atlante F.C.	
MF	Alessio Scarchilli	Torino	loan ended
FW	Daniele Dichio	Sunderland A.F.C.	

==== Autumn ====
In
Pos.	Name	from	Type
MF	Fabio Pecchia	Juventus	
DF	Saliou Lassissi	Parma	loan

Out
Pos.	Name	To	Type
FW	Paco Soares	Empoli	loan
DF	Emanuele Pesaresi	Napoli	loan
DF	Oumar Dieng	Auxerre	
MF	Mattia Biso	Parma F.C.	
FW	Fabrizio Ficini	Fiorentina	loan

==== Winter ====
In
Pos.	Name	from	Type
MF	Doriva	Porto	
MF	Lee Sharpe	Bradford City	loan

Out
Pos.	Name	To	Type
MF	Gastón Córdoba	Colón	

== Competitions ==
=== Serie A ===
==== League table ====
Pos	Team	Pld	W	D	L	GF	GA	GD	Pts	Qualification or relegation
14	Perugia (Note: Perugia gained entry to the 1999 UEFA Intertoto Cup Second round after the renounce of several teams.)	34	11	6	17	43	61	−18	39	Qualification to Intertoto Cup second round
15	Salernitana (R)	34	10	8	16	37	51	−14	38	Relegation to Serie B
16	Sampdoria (R)	34	9	10	15	38	55	−17	37	Relegation to Serie B
17	Vicenza (R)	34	8	9	17	27	47	−20	33	Relegation to Serie B
18	Empoli (Note: Empoli were docked two points due to attempted bribery of referee during a match against Sampdoria on 25 October 1998.) (R)	34	4	10	20	26	63	−37	20	Relegation to Serie B

Source: Serie A, RSSSF.com, Soccerway
Rules for classification: 1) Points; 2) Head-to-head points; 3) Head-to-head goal difference; 4) Goal difference; 5) Goals scored; 6) Draw. (Note: Head-to-head record is used only after all the matches between the teams in question have been played).
(R) Relegated

==== Results summary ====
Overall								Home						Away					
Pld	W	D	L	GF	GA	GD	Pts	W	D	L	GF	GA	GD	W	D	L	GF	GA	GD
34	9	10	15	38	55	−17	37	8	6	3	25	16	+9	1	4	12	13	39	−26

Source: Worldfootball

==== Results by round ====
Round	1	2	3	4	5	6	7	8	9	10	11	12	13	14	15	16	17	18	19	20	21	22	23	24	25	26	27	28	29	30	31	32	33	34
Ground	H	A	H	A	H	A	H	A	H	A	H	A	H	A	H	A	H	A	H	A	H	A	H	A	H	A	H	A	H	A	H	A	H	A
Result	D	D	L	W	L	W	L	W	L	D	D	L	L	D	L	D	L	D	L	D	L	W	W	L	L	W	L	W	D	L	L	W	D	W
Position	6	8	12	9	12	9	12	7	10	12	13	13	13	13	14	14	14	15	15	16	17	14	14	14	15	14	15	15	15	16	17	16	16	16

Source: Competitive matches
A = Away; H = Home; W = Win; D = Draw; L = Loss; P = Postponed; = Leader, 1999–2000 UEFA Champions League Group stage; = 1999–2000 UEFA Champions League Group stage; = 1999–2000 UEFA Champions League Qualifying round; = 1999–2000 UEFA Cup First round; = Qualification to Intertoto Cup; = 1999–2000 Serie B

==== Matches ====
13 September 1998 1	Udinese	2–2	Sampdoria	Udine
	Bachini 15'; Amoroso 42'		Bertotto 32' (o.g.); Montella 37'	Stadium: Stadio Friuli; Referee: Domenico Messina

20 September 1998 2	Sampdoria	1–1	Perugia	Genoa
	Laigle 21'		Olive 48'	Stadium: Stadio Luigi Ferraris; Referee: Massimo De Santis

27 September 1998 3	Cagliari	5–0	Sampdoria	Cagliari
	Kallon 7', 76'; Muzzi 10'; Vasari 69'; Berretta 78'			Stadium: Stadio Sant'Elia; Referee: Gennaro Borriello

4 October 1998 4	Sampdoria	2–1	Roma	Genoa
	Palmieri 61'; Iacopino 69'		Delvecchio 26'	Stadium: Stadio Luigi Ferraris; Referee: Daniele Tombolini

18 October 1998 5	Piacenza	4–1	Sampdoria	Piacenza
	Vierchowod 3'; Inzaghi 42' (pen.); Manighetti 72'; Rastelli 87'		Ortega 28' (pen.)	Stadium: Stadio Leonardo Garilli; Referee: Pierluigi Collina

25 October 1998 6	Sampdoria	3–0	Empoli	Genoa
	Palmieri 19'; Ortega 70'; Palmieri 73'			Stadium: Stadio Luigi Ferraris; Referee: Piero Ceccarini

1 November 1998 7	Juventus	2–0	Sampdoria	Turin
	Inzaghi 44', 59'			Stadium: Stadio Delle Alpi; Referee: Cosimo Bolognino

8 November 1998 8	Sampdoria	1–0	Salernitana	Genoa
	Ortega 50' (pen.)			Stadium: Stadio Luigi Ferraris; Referee: Roberto Bettin

15 November 1998 9	Internazionale	3–0	Sampdoria	Milan
	Djorkaeff 6' (pen.), 17' (pen.); Zamorano 80'			Stadium: San Siro; Referee: Alfredo Trentalange

22 November 1998 10	Sampdoria	0–0	Vicenza	Genoa
				Stadium: Stadio Luigi Ferraris; Referee: Robert Boggi

29 November 1998 11	Venezia	0–0	Sampdoria	Venice
				Stadium: Stadio Pier Luigi Penzo; Referee: Emilio Pellegrino

6 December 1998 12	Sampdoria	0–2	Parma	Genoa
			Chiesa 45', 47'	Stadium: Stadio Luigi Ferraris; Referee: Fiorenzo Treossi

13 December 1998 13	Lazio	5–2	Sampdoria	Rome
	Mihajlović 29', 45', 52'; Stanković 82'; Salas 90'		Palmieri 37' (pen.), 56' (pen.)	Stadium: Stadio Olimpico; Referee: Pierluigi Collina

20 December 1998 14	Sampdoria	2–2	Milan	Genoa
	Palmieri 58'; Ortega 86'		Leonardo 39'; Bierhoff 73'	Stadium: Stadio Luigi Ferraris; Referee: Roberto Bettin

6 January 1999 15	Fiorentina	1–0	Sampdoria	Florence
	Costa 28'			Stadium: Stadio Artemio Franchi; Referee: Pierluigi Collina

10 January 1999 16	Sampdoria	1–1	Bologna	Genoa
	Palmieri 62'		Signori 13'	Stadium: Stadio Luigi Ferraris; Referee: Daniele Tombolini

17 January 1999 17	Bari	3–1	Sampdoria	Bari
	Masinga 35'; De Rosa 47'; Olivares 70'		Laigle 66'	Stadium: Stadio San Nicola; Referee: Cosimo Bolognino

24 January 1999 18	Sampdoria	1–1	Udinese	Genoa
	Ortega 52'		Sosa 3'	Stadium: Stadio Luigi Ferraris; Referee: Roberto Bettin

31 January 1999 19	Perugia	2–0	Sampdoria	Perugia
	Kaviedes 21'; Matrecano 26'			Stadium: Stadio Renato Curi; Referee: Robert Boggi

7 February 1999 20	Sampdoria	0–0	Cagliari	Genoa
				Stadium: Stadio Luigi Ferraris; Referee: Massimo De Santis

14 February 1999 21	Roma	3–1	Sampdoria	Rome
	Fábio Júnior 10'; Paulo Sérgio 85', 88'		Lassissi 15'	Stadium: Stadio Olimpico; Referee: Stefano Farina

21 February 1999 22	Sampdoria	3–2	Piacenza	Genoa
	Montella 23' (pen.); Laigle 34'; Ortega 57'		Piovani 70'; Dionigi 82' (pen.)	Stadium: Stadio Luigi Ferraris; Referee: Massimo De Santis

28 February 1999 23	Empoli	0–1	Sampdoria	Empoli
			Pecchia 31'	Stadium: Stadio Carlo Castellani; Referee: Emilio Pellegrino

7 March 1999 24	Sampdoria	1–2	Juventus	Genoa
	Ortega 64'		Amoruso 74'; Inzaghi 90'	Stadium: Stadio Luigi Ferraris; Referee: Stefano Farina

14 March 1999 25	Salernitana	2–0	Sampdoria	Salerno
	Koloušek 62'; Fresi 84'			Stadium: Stadio Arechi; Referee: Alfredo Trentalange

21 March 1999 26	Sampdoria	4–0	Internazionale	Genoa
	Montella 12', 52' (pen.), 66'; Ortega 69'			Stadium: Stadio Luigi Ferraris; Referee: Daniele Tombolini

3 April 1999 27	Vicenza	1–0	Sampdoria	Vicenza
	Otero 33'			Stadium: Stadio Romeo Menti; Referee: Salvatore Racalbuto

11 April 1999 28	Sampdoria	2–1	Venezia	Genoa
	Montella 6' (pen.); Catê 71'		Valtolina 52'	Stadium: Stadio Luigi Ferraris; Referee: Emilio Pellegrino

18 April 1999 29	Parma	1–1	Sampdoria	Parma
	Sensini 43'		Montella 53' (pen.)	Stadium: Stadio Ennio Tardini; Referee: Daniele Tombolini

25 April 1999 30	Sampdoria	0–1	Lazio	Genoa
			Vieri 60'	Stadium: Stadio Luigi Ferraris; Attendance: 16,885; Referee: Livio Bazzoli

2 May 1999 31	Milan	3–2	Sampdoria	Milan
	Ambrosini 17'; Leonardo 79'; Castellini 90' (o.g.)		Montella 60'; Franceschetti 86'	Stadium: San Siro; Attendance: 70,000; Referee: Stefano Braschi

9 May 1999 32	Sampdoria	3–2	Fiorentina	Genoa
	Montella 29', 51'; Palmieri 78'		Costa 20' (pen.); Heinrich 41'	Stadium: Stadio Luigi Ferraris; Attendance: 21,000; Referee: Roberto Bettin

16 May 1999 33	Bologna	2–2	Sampdoria	Bologna
	Ingesson 28', 90+5'		Montella 5', 39'	Stadium: Stadio Renato Dall'Ara; Attendance: 23,000; Referee: Alfredo Trentalange

23 May 1999 34	Sampdoria	1–0	Bari	Genoa
	Doriva 33'			Stadium: Stadio Luigi Ferraris; Attendance: 17,000; Referee: Stefano Farina

=== Coppa Italia ===
==== Round of 32 ====
9 September 1998 First leg	Sampdoria	2–0	Hellas Verona	Genoa
20:45	Ortega 14'; Montella 59'			Stadium: Stadio Luigi Ferraris; Attendance: 8,000; Referee: Roberto Rosetti

23 September 1998 Second leg	Hellas Verona	1–0	Sampdoria	Verona
20:30	Pesaresi 10' (o.g.)			Stadium: Stadio Marcantonio Bentegodi; Attendance: 3,350; Referee: Pierpaolo Rossi

==== Round of 16 ====
28 October 1998 First leg	Sampdoria	0–0	Bologna	Genoa
20:30				Stadium: Stadio Luigi Ferraris; Attendance: 7,136; Referee: Domenico Messina

11 November 1998 Second leg	Bologna	2–1	Sampdoria	Bologna
20:30	Signori 65'; Kolyvanov 89' (pen.)		F. Palmieri 8'	Stadium: Stadio Renato Dall'Ara; Attendance: 8,445; Referee: Alfredo Trentalange

=== UEFA Intertoto Cup ===
==== Second round ====
4 July 1998 First leg	Sampdoria (Italy)	2–0	(Slovakia) Rimavská Sobota	Genoa, Italy
20:30	Palmieri 37'; Catê 67'	Report		Stadium: Stadio Luigi Ferraris; Attendance: 15,000; Referee: Stéphane Bre (France)

11 July 1998 Second leg	Rimavská Sobota (Slovakia)	1–0 (1–2 agg.)	(Italy) Sampdoria	Rimavská Sobota, Slovakia
16:30	Orabinec 2'	Report		Stadium: Na Záhradkách Stadium; Attendance: 6,223; Referee: Steve Dunn (England)

==== Third round ====
18 July 1998 First leg	Harelbeke (Belgium)	0–1	(Italy) Sampdoria	Harelbeke, Belgium
18:00		Report	Montella 89' (pen.)	Stadium: Forestierstadion; Attendance: 4,000; Referee: Arturo Daudén Ibáñez (Spain)

25 July 1998 Second leg	Sampdoria (Italy)	3–0 (4–0 agg.)	(Belgium) Harelbeke	Genoa, Italy
20:45	Palmieri 32'; Montella 36', 84' (pen.)	Report		Stadium: Stadio Luigi Ferraris; Attendance: 10,500; Referee: Hermann Albrecht (Germany)

==== Semi-finals ====
29 July 1998 First leg	Bologna (Italy)	3–1	(Italy) Sampdoria	Bologna, Italy
20:35	Andersson 1'; Paramatti 31'; Kolyvanov 90'	Report	Palmieri 17'	Stadium: Stadio Renato Dall'Ara; Attendance: 8,000; Referee: Juan Fernández Marín (Spain)

5 August 1998 Second leg	Sampdoria (Italy)	1–0 (2–3 agg.)	(Italy) Bologna	Genoa, Italy
20:45	Palmieri 27'	Report UEFA Report 2		Stadium: Stadio Luigi Ferraris; Attendance: 14,000; Referee: Atanas Uzunov (Bulgaria)

== Statistics ==
=== Players statistics ===
No.	Pos	Nat	Player	Total		Serie A		Coppa		Intertoto	
No.	Pos	Nat	Player	Apps	Goals	Apps	Goals	Apps	Goals	Apps	Goals
1	GK	(Italy) ITA	Ferron	39	-44	31	-44	3	0	5	0
6	DF	(Italy) ITA	Balleri	38	0	29+1	0	2	0	6	0
23	DF	(Italy) ITA	Grandoni	41	0	31	0	4	0	6	0
25	DF	(Federal Republic of Yugoslavia) YUG	Sakic	33	0	22+3	0	3	0	5	0
4	DF	(Italy) ITA	Franceschetti	25	1	23	1	2	0	0	0
8	MF	(France) FRA	Laigle	38	3	31	3	3	0	4	0
32	MF	(Brazil) BRA	Doriva	17	1	17	1				
7	AM	(Italy) ITA	Pecchia	26	3	26	1				
9	FW	(Italy) ITA	Montella	29	16	21+1	12	1	1	6	3
10	FW	(Argentina) ARG	Ortega	31	9	25+2	8	4	1	0	0
11	FW	(Italy) ITA	Palmieri	42	13	33	8	3	1	6	4
22	GK	(Italy) ITA	Ambrosio	9	-11	3+4	-11	1	0	1	0
2	DF	(Italy) ITA	Castellini	31	0	19+8	0	2	0	2	0
24	DF	(Ivory Coast) CIV	Lassissi	20	1	18+1	1	1	0		
19	MF	(Italy) ITA	Vergassola	23	0	8+11	0	3	0	1	0
5	DF	(Italy) ITA	Mannini	17	0	7+3	0	1	0	6	0
15	DF	(Portugal) POR	Hugo	15	0	7+8	0				
3	DF	(Italy) ITA	Nava	14	0	6+3	0	3	0	2	0
26	MF	(Italy) ITA	Ficini	17	0	6+3	0	2	0	6	0
18	MF	(Italy) ITA	Sgro	23	0	4+11	0	2	0	6	0
14	MF	(Italy) ITA	Iacopino	17	11	4+13	1				
17	FW	(Brazil) BRA	Catê	23	2	1+14	1	3	0	5	1
31	MF	(England) ENG	Sharpe	3	0	1+2	0				
13	MF	(Federal Republic of Yugoslavia) YUG	Zivkovic	10	0	0+4	0	1	0	5	0
21	MF	(Italy) ITA	Solari	1	0	0+1	0				
20	FW	(Federal Republic of Yugoslavia) YUG	Jovicic	1	0	0	0	1	0	0	0
30	FW	(Italy) ITA	Aloe	1	0	0+1	0	0	0	0	0
12	GK	(Italy) ITA	Fuselli	0	0	0	-0	0	-0	0	-0
24	MF	(Italy) ITA	Mattia Biso	1	0	0	0	1	0	0	0
16	MF	(Argentina) ARG	Cordoba	3	0	0	0	2	0	1	0
7	MF	(Italy) ITA	Pesaresi	4	0	0	0	1	0	3	0
29	MF	(Italy) ITA	Piredda	1	0	0	0	1	0	0	0
27	MF	(Brazil) BRA	Paco Soares	1	0	0	0	1	0		
24	DF	(Senegal) SEN	Dieng	1	0	0	0	0	0	1	0

- Source: http://calcio-seriea.net/presenze/1998/1159/
