= List of Italian football transfers summer 2000 (co-ownership) =

This is a list of Italian football transfers for co-ownership resolutions, for the 2000-01 season, from and to Serie A and Serie B.

According to Article 102 bis of NOIF (Norme Organizzative Interne della F.I.G.C). The co-ownership deal must be confirmed each year. The deal may expired, renewed, bought back or sold outright. Deals that failed to form an agreement after the deadline, will be defined by auction between the 2 clubs. Which the club will submit their bid in a sealed envelope. Non-submission may lead to the rights is free to give to the opposite side. The mother club could sell their rights to third parties.

== Co-ownership ==
Date	Name	Co-own Club	Mother club	Result	Fee
	Adaílton	Verona	Parma	Renewed	
	Alessandro Agostini	Pistoiese	Fiorentina	Renewed	
	Alessandro Alessandrì	Sanremese	Internazionale	Internazionale	Undisclosed
	Giuseppe Alessi	Napoli	Torino	Renewed	
	Fabio Alteri	Lumezzane	Cesena	Renewed	
	Luca Altomare	Cosenza	Napoli	Renewed	
	Alessandro Ambrosi	Monza	Crotone	Crotone	Undisclosed
	Roberto Ambrosini	Lumezzane	Treviso	ND	
	Federico Amenta	Alessandria	Torino	Torino	Undisclosed
	Dario Baccin	Ternana	Juventus	Renewed	
	Fabio Barison	Pro Vercelli	Juventus	ND (Pro Vercelli)	Free
2000-05-24	Jonatan Binotto	Bologna	Juventus	Bologna	L 10 billion (player exchange)
	Arnaldo Bonfanti	Reggiana	Atalanta	Reggiana	Undisclosed
	Mauro Briano	Savoia	Reggina	Reggina	Undisclosed
	Giuseppe Bugiolacchi	Pontedera	Juventus	Pontedera	Auction, ~L 48 million
	Alex Calderoni	Alzano	Cesena		
	Francesco Carbone	Chievo	Foggia	Chievo	Undisclosed
	Paolo Chiavaroli	Alessandria	Juventus	ND (Alessandria)	Free
	Antonio Chimenti	Lecce	Roma	Lecce	L 1.3 billion
	Daniele Conti	Cagliari	Roma	Cagliari	L 1.25 billion
2000-05-30	Morgan De Sanctis	Udinese	Juventus	Udinese	L 8 billion
	Alessandro Doga	Lecce	Sampdoria	ND (Lecce)	Free
	Massimo Epifani	Gubbio	Roma	Roma	L 90 million
	Enrico Fantini	Venezia	Juventus	Venezia	L 0.2 billion
	Luigi Giandomenico	Venezia	Juventus	Renewed	
	Corrado Grabbi	Ternana	Juventus	Ternana	Undisclosed
2000-06-15	Mohamed Kallon (Sierra Leone)	Reggina	Internazionale	Internazionale	Undisclosed
	Giorgio Lucenti	Napoli	Roma	Roma	L 0.99 billion
	Simone Malatesta	Juventus	Modena	Renewed	
	Christian Manfredini	Genoa	Juventus	Genoa	L 0.6 billion
	Paolo Milano	Biellese	Juventus	Biellese	L 10.5 million + L 25 million + L 13~14 million (along with Saviozzi)
	Luca Moreo	Viterbese	Juventus	Renewed	
	Ronnie O'Brien (Republic of Ireland)	Crotone	Juventus	Juventus	Undisclosed
	Massimo Oddo	Napoli	Milan	Milan	Auction, Undisclosed
	Joseph Dayo Oshadogan	Reggina	Roma	Reggina	L 1.5 billion
	Nicola Padoin	Prato	Milan	Prato	Undisclosed
	Nicola Pagani	Fermana	Reggina	Reggina	Undisclosed
	Angelo Paradiso	Cesena	Lecce	ND (Cesena)	Free
	Fabio Pecchia	Torino	Juventus	Renewed	
	Simone Perrotta	Bari	Juventus	Renewed	
	Paolo Poggi	Roma	Udinese	Roma	L 1 million
	Ciro Polito	Lucchese	Salernitana	Salernitana	
	Andrea Polizzano	Lecco	Internazionale	Internazionale	Undisclosed
	Simone Puleo	Foggia	Milan	Milan	Auction, Undisclosed
	Pierre Giorgio Regonesi	Juventus	Atalanta	Renewed	
	Tommaso Rocchi	Como	Juventus	Como	L 0.9 billion
	Marco Saviozzi	Biellese	Juventus	Biellese	L 10.5 million + L 25 million + L 13~14 million (along with Milano)
	Franco Semioli	Internazionale	Torino	Renewed	
	Cristian Servidei	Ternana	Roma	ND (Ternana)	Free
	Lorenzo Squizzi	Salernitana	Lucchese	ND	
2000-06-20	Massimo Tarantino	Bologna	Internazionale	Bologna	Undisclosed
2000-06-15	Nicola Ventola	Bologna	Internazionale	Internazionale	Undisclosed
	Max Vieri	Brescello	Juventus	Juventus	Undisclosed
	Pierre Womé	Bologna	Roma	Bologna	L 1 million
2000-05-30	Marco Zamboni	Udinese	Juventus	Renewed	
2000-06-20	Cristiano Zanetti	Roma	Internazionale	Renewed	
	Massimiliano Zazzetta	Como	Juventus	Juventus	L 0.15 billion
	Zé Elias	Bologna	Internazionale	Internazionale	Undisclosed
