= 2004–05 AS Livorno Calcio season =

Livorno
2004–05 season
- President: Aldo Spinelli
- Manager: Franco Colomba (until 11 January); Roberto Donadoni (from 11 January)
- Stadium: Stadio Armando Picchi
- Serie A: 9th
- Coppa Italia: Second stage
- Top goalscorer: League: Cristiano Lucarelli (24); All: Cristiano Lucarelli (25)
- Highest home attendance: 19,726
- Lowest home attendance: 13,051
- Average home league attendance: 15,334

The 2004–05 season was the 90th season in the existence of AS Livorno Calcio and the club's first season back in the top-flight of Italian football. In addition to the domestic league, Livorno participated in this season's edition of the Coppa Italia.

Manager Franco Colomba was sacked in January, with former manager Roberto Donadoni returning for a second spell in charge. Livorno ultimately finished 9th.

== Players ==
Squad at end of season

Note: Flags indicate national team as defined under FIFA eligibility rules; some limited exceptions apply. Players may hold more than one non-FIFA nationality.

| No. | Pos. | Nation | Player |
|---|---|---|---|
| 1 | GK | ITA | Marco Amelia |
| 3 | MF | ITA | Alessandro Gambadori |
| 4 | MF | POR | José Luís Vidigal (Note: Vidigal was born in Sá da Bandeira (now Lubango), Angola, but was raised in Portugal and made his international debut for Portugal in 2000.) |
| 5 | DF | ITA | Alessandro Lucarelli |
| 6 | DF | ITA | Fabio Galante |
| 7 | DF | ITA | Alessandro Grandoni |
| 8 | DF | FRA | Marc Pfertzel |
| 9 | FW | LTU | Tomas Danilevičius |
| 10 | FW | ITA | Igor Protti |
| 13 | DF | CHI | Jorge Vargas |
| 14 | MF | ITA | Claudio Grauso |
| 15 | MF | ITA | Alessandro Doga |
| 16 | DF | ITA | Andrea Giallombardo |
| 17 | DF | GHA | Emmanuel Osei |
| 19 | DF | ITA | Gabriele Baldi |
| 20 | MF | ITA | Luca Vigiani |

| No. | Pos. | Nation | Player |
|---|---|---|---|
| 21 | MF | ITA | Matteo Lombardi |
| 22 | GK | ITA | Gianmatteo Mareggini |
| 23 | FW | ITA | Corrado Colombo (on loan Sampdoria) |
| 28 | MF | ITA | Dario Passoni |
| 30 | MF | ITA | Alessandro Stefanini |
| 32 | MF | CZE | Mario Lička (on loan from Baník Ostrava) |
| 67 | MF | ITA | Gennaro Ruotolo |
| 69 | DF | ITA | David Balleri |
| 79 | DF | ITA | Matteo Melara |
| 84 | GK | ITA | Luca Mazzoni |
| 86 | FW | BRA | Paulinho |
| 87 | GK | ITA | Marco Buonocore |
| 88 | GK | ITA | Davide Bacci |
| 98 | DF | ITA | Brando Garzelli |
| 99 | FW | ITA | Cristiano Lucarelli |

=== Left club during season ===
Note: Flags indicate national team as defined under FIFA eligibility rules; some limited exceptions apply. Players may hold more than one non-FIFA nationality.

| No. / Pos. / Nation / Player; 19 / DF / ITA / Alessandro Evangelisti (released) | No. / Pos. / Nation / Player; 21 / MF / CHI / Nicolás Córdova (to Ascoli) |

== Competitions ==
=== Serie A ===
| Pos | Team | Pld | W | D | L | GF | GA | GD | Pts | Qualification or relegation |
|---|---|---|---|---|---|---|---|---|---|---|
| 7 | Messina | 38 | 12 | 12 | 14 | 44 | 52 | −8 | 48 | |
| 8 | Roma (Note: Roma gained entry to the 2005–06 UEFA Cup as 2004–05 Coppa Italia runners-up: champions Internazionale qualified to the 2005–06 UEFA Champions League.) | 38 | 11 | 12 | 15 | 55 | 58 | −3 | 45 | Qualification to UEFA Cup first round |
| 9 | Livorno | 38 | 11 | 12 | 15 | 49 | 60 | −11 | 45 | |
| 10 | Reggina | 38 | 10 | 14 | 14 | 36 | 45 | −9 | 44 | |
| 11 | Lecce | 38 | 10 | 14 | 14 | 66 | 73 | −7 | 44 | |

Source: 2004–05 Serie A, RSSSF.com, Soccerway
Rules for classification: 1) Points; 2) Head-to-head points; 3) Head-to-head goal difference; 4) Goal difference; 5) Goals scored; 6) Draw. (Note: Head-to-head record is used only after all the matches between the teams in question have been played).
