= 2000–01 SS Lazio season =

Lazio
2000–01 season
- Owner: Sergio Cragnotti
- President: Sergio Cragnotti
- Manager: Sven-Göran Eriksson (until 7 January 2001); Dino Zoff
- Stadium: Stadio Olimpico
- Serie A: 3rd
- Coppa Italia: Quarter-finals
- Supercoppa Italiana: Winners
- UEFA Champions League: Second group stage
- Top goalscorer: League: Hernán Crespo (26); All: Hernán Crespo (28)
Home colours	Away colours	Third colours

The 2000–01 season was the 101st season in Società Sportiva Lazio's history and their 13th consecutive season in the top-flight of Italian football. Lazio were unable to defend their Serie A title won in 2000 after finishing third, but won the Supercoppa Italiana.

== Summary ==
On 30 October, manager Sven-Goran Eriksson was appointed by Football Association as its new England manager from July 2001. After his departure was announced, the team collapsed to the 4th spot. On 7 January 2001, Eriksson left the club and Cragnotti appointed Dino Zoff as its new manager.

== Players ==
Note: Flags indicate national team as defined under FIFA eligibility rules; some limited exceptions apply. Players may hold more than one non-FIFA nationality.

No.	Pos.	Nation	Player
1	GK	ITA	Luca Marchegiani
2	DF	ITA	Paolo Negro
4	MF	ITA	Dino Baggio
5	DF	GHA	Daniel Ola
6	MF	CZE	Karel Poborský
7	FW	ARG	Claudio López
8	MF	ITA	Roberto Baronio
9	FW	CHI	Marcelo Salas
10	FW	ARG	Hernán Crespo
11	DF	YUG	Siniša Mihajlović
13	DF	ITA	Alessandro Nesta
14	MF	ARG	Diego Simeone
15	DF	ITA	Giuseppe Pancaro
16	DF	ITA	Emanuele Pesaresi

No.	Pos.	Nation	Player
17	DF	ITA	Guerino Gottardi
18	MF	CZE	Pavel Nedvěd
19	DF	ITA	Giuseppe Favalli
20	MF	YUG	Dejan Stanković
21	FW	ITA	Simone Inzaghi
22	GK	ITA	Paolo Orlandoni
23	MF	ARG	Juan Sebastián Verón
24	DF	POR	Fernando Couto
25	MF	ITA	Attilio Lombardo
26	DF	ITA	Maurizio Domizzi
32	FW	ITA	Fabrizio Ravanelli
33	DF	ITA	Francesco Colonnese
35	MF	ARG	Lucas Castromán
70	GK	ITA	Angelo Peruzzi

=== Transfers ===
In
Pos.	Name	from	Type
FW	Hernán Crespo	Parma	€56.81 million
FW	Claudio López	Valencia	€23.00 million
GK	Angelo Peruzzi	Internazionale	€17.90 million
DF	Francesco Colonnese	Internazionale	
DF	Emanuele Pesaresi	Sampdoria	
MF	Roberto Baronio	Reggina	co-ownership
GK	Paolo Orlandoni	Reggina	loan
DF	Maurizio Domizzi	Livorno	loan ended
MF	Iván de la Peña	Marseille	loan ended
MF	Stefano Fiore	Udinese	€25.00 million
MF	Giuliano Giannichedda	Udinese	€7.50 million

Out
Pos.	Name	To	Type
FW	Roberto Mancini		Retired
FW	Alen Bokšić	Middlesbrough	
MF	Matías Almeyda	Parma	€23.00 million
MF	Sérgio Conceição	Parma	€17.00 million
MF	Dario Marcolin	Sampdoria	
GK	Marco Ballotta	Internazionale	
DF	Emanuele Conti	Teramo	
MF	Giampiero Pinzi	Udinese	co-ownership
MF	Stefano Fiore	Udinese	loan
MF	Giuliano Giannichedda	Udinese	loan
MF	Iván de la Peña	Barcelona	loan
GK	Luca Mondini	Napoli	loan ended
GK	Emanuele Concetti	Arezzo	loan

==== Winter ====
In
Pos.	Name	from	Type
MF	Dino Baggio	Parma	
MF	Karel Poborský	Benfica	€2.25 million
MF	Lucas Castromán	Velez Sarsfield	

Out
Pos.	Name	To	Type
DF	Néstor Sensini	Parma	free
MF	Attilio Lombardo	Sampdoria	

=== Kits ===
Centennial	Home	Away	Home Champions League	Away Champions League

== Competitions ==
=== Supercoppa Italiana ===
8 September 2000	Lazio	4–3	Internazionale	Rome
20:45 CEST (UTC+02:00)	López 33', 38'; Mihajlović 47' (pen.); Stanković 74'	Report	Keane 2'; Farinós 61'; Vampeta 75'	Stadium: Stadio Olimpico; Attendance: 65,000; Referee: Stefano Farina

=== Serie A ===
==== League table ====
Pos	Team	Pld	W	D	L	GF	GA	GD	Pts	Qualification or relegation
1	Roma (C)	34	22	9	3	68	33	+35	75	Qualification to Champions League first group stage
2	Juventus	34	21	10	3	61	27	+34	73	Qualification to Champions League first group stage
3	Lazio	34	21	6	7	65	36	+29	69	Qualification to Champions League third qualifying round
4	Parma	34	16	8	10	51	31	+20	56	Qualification to Champions League third qualifying round
5	Internazionale	34	14	9	11	47	47	0	51	Qualification to UEFA Cup first round

Source: 2000–01 Serie A, Soccerway, RSSSF.com
Rules for classification: 1) Points; 2) Head-to-head points; 3) Head-to-head goal difference; 4) Goal difference; 5) Goals scored; 6) Draw. (Note: Head-to-head record is used only after all the matches between the teams in question have been played).
(C) Champions

==== Results summary ====
Overall								Home						Away					
Pld	W	D	L	GF	GA	GD	Pts	W	D	L	GF	GA	GD	W	D	L	GF	GA	GD
34	21	6	7	65	36	+29	69	13	2	2	36	13	+23	8	4	5	29	23	+6

Last updated: 7 August 2015.
Source: Competitive matches

==== Results by round ====
Round	1	2	3	4	5	6	7	8	9	10	11	12	13	14	15	16	17	18	19	20	21	22	23	24	25	26	27	28	29	30	31	32	33	34
Ground	A	H	A	H	H	A	H	A	H	A	H	A	H	A	H	A	H	H	A	H	A	A	H	A	H	A	H	A	H	A	H	A	H	A
Result	D	W	L	W	W	D	D	L	W	W	L	W	L	W	W	W	W	D	W	W	W	L	W	L	W	W	W	D	W	W	W	D	W	L
Position	6	3	8	5	4	4	5	7	7	4	5	4	4	3	3	3	2	3	3	3	3	3	3	3	3	3	3	3	2	2	2	3	3	3

Source: Competitive matches
A = Away; H = Home; W = Win; D = Draw; L = Loss; P = Postponed; = Leader, 2001–02 UEFA Champions League Group stage; = 2001–02 UEFA Champions League Group stage; = 2001–02 UEFA Champions League Qualifying round; = 2001–02 UEFA Cup First round; = Qualification to Intertoto Cup; = 2001–02 Serie B

==== Matches ====
1 October 2000 1	Atalanta	2–2	Lazio	Bergamo
20:30 CEST (UTC+02:00)	Pancaro 21' (o.g.); C. Zenoni 51'	Report	Mihajlović 3'; S. Inzaghi 73'	Stadium: Stadio Atleti Azzurri d'Italia; Attendance: 18,483; Referee: Alfredo Trentalange

14 October 2000 2	Lazio	3–0	Perugia	Rome
15:00 CEST (UTC+02:00)	Crespo 43'; Mihajlović 68' (pen.); S. Inzaghi 78'	Report		Stadium: Stadio Olimpico; Attendance: 41,592; Referee: Pierluigi Collina

22 October 2000 3	Hellas Verona	2–0	Lazio	Verona
15:00 CEST (UTC+02:00)	Favalli 54' (o.g.), (yellow card); Mutu 79', (yellow card); Mazzola (yellow card) (yellow-red card) 87'; Ferron (yellow card)	Report	Favalli (yellow card); Simeone (yellow card); Mihajlović (penalty missed) 90+1'	Stadium: Stadio Marcantonio Bentegodi; Attendance: 18,461; Referee: Alfredo Trentalange

1 November 2000 4	Lazio	2–1	Brescia	Rome
15:00 CET (UTC+01:00)	S. Inzaghi 34' (pen.), 79'		Hübner 4' (pen.)	Stadium: Stadio Olimpico; Attendance: 42,843; Referee: Stefano Farina

4 November 2000 5	Lazio	2–0	Bologna	Rome
20:30 CET (UTC+01:00)	Nedvěd 10'; Crespo 65'			Stadium: Stadio Olimpico; Attendance: 43,272; Referee: Emilio Pellegrino

11 November 2000 6	Juventus	1–1	Lazio	Turin
20:30 CET (UTC+01:00)	Tudor 22'	Report	Salas 30'	Stadium: Stadio delle Alpi; Attendance: 42,095; Referee: Stefano Braschi

19 November 2000 7	Lazio	1–1	Milan	Rome
20:30 CET (UTC+01:00)	D. Baggio 3'	Report	Shevchenko 54'	Stadium: Stadio Olimpico; Attendance: 57,431; Referee: Gennaro Borriello

25 November 2000 8	Parma	2–0	Lazio	Parma
15:00 CET (UTC+01:00)	Conceição 10'; Lamouchi 89'	Report		Stadium: Stadio Ennio Tardini; Attendance: 21,116; Referee: Roberto Rosetti

2 December 2000 9	Lazio	2–0	Reggina	Rome
15:00 CET (UTC+01:00)	Salas 26'; Crespo 57'			Stadium: Stadio Olimpico; Attendance: 39,468; Referee: Alberto Castellani

10 December 2000 10	Vicenza	1–4	Lazio	Vicenza
15:00 CET (UTC+01:00)	Kallon 77'	Report	Nedvěd 14', 73'; Crespo 25'; Salas 88'	Stadium: Stadio Romeo Menti; Attendance: 14,324; Referee: Daniele Tombolini

17 December 2000 11	Lazio	0–1	Roma	Rome
20:30 CET (UTC+01:00)			Negro 70' (o.g.)	Stadium: Stadio Olimpico; Attendance: 73,988; Referee: Graziano Cesari

23 December 2000 12	Bari	1–2	Lazio	Bari
20:30 CET (UTC+01:00)	D. Andersson 84' (pen.)	Report	Mihajlović 41'; Ravanelli 64'	Stadium: Stadio San Nicola; Attendance: 11,072; Referee: Domenico Messina

7 January 2001 13	Lazio	1–2	Napoli	Rome
15:00 CET (UTC+01:00)	Mihajlović 84' (pen.)	Report	Amoruso 4'; Pancaro 36' (o.g.)	Stadium: Stadio Olimpico; Attendance: 51,301; Referee: Salvatore Racalbuto

14 January 2001 14	Udinese	3–4	Lazio	Udine
15:00 CET (UTC+01:00)	Fiore 47'; Margiotta 64'; Sosa 85'	Report	Zamboni 3' (o.g.); Crespo 35', 50'; Salas 46'	Stadium: Stadio Friuli; Attendance: 18,325; Referee: Fiorenzo Treossi

20 January 2001 15	Lazio	2–0	Internazionale	Rome
20:30 CET (UTC+01:00)	Crespo 5'; Salas 75' (pen.)	Report		Stadium: Stadio Olimpico; Attendance: 52,512; Referee: Domenico Messina

28 January 2001 16	Fiorentina	1–4	Lazio	Florence
15:00 CET (UTC+01:00)	Chiesa 82' (pen.)	Report	Nedvěd 33'; Crespo 58', 74'; Salas 85'	Stadium: Stadio Artemio Franchi; Attendance: 33,590; Referee: Salvatore Racalbuto

4 February 2001 17	Lazio	3–2	Lecce	Rome
15:00 CET (UTC+01:00)	Crespo 41', 65'; Verón 76'	Report	Conticchio 52'; Lucarelli 75'	Stadium: Stadio Olimpico; Attendance: 43,200; Referee: Gennaro Borriello

10 February 2001 18	Lazio	0–0	Atalanta	Rome
15:00 CET (UTC+01:00)		Report		Stadium: Stadio Olimpico; Attendance: 43,294; Referee: Pierluigi Collina

18 February 2001 19	Perugia	0–1	Lazio	Perugia
15:00 CET (UTC+01:00)		Report	Simeone 88'	Stadium: Stadio Renato Curi; Attendance: 12,473; Referee: Stefano Braschi

25 February 2001 20	Lazio	5–3	Hellas Verona	Rome
15:00 CET (UTC+01:00)	Poborský 14'; Crespo 40', 75', 90'; Nedvěd 49'	Report	Camoranesi 47'; Gilardino 64'; Cossato 84'	Stadium: Stadio Olimpico; Attendance: 40,343; Referee: Pierluigi Collina

3 March 2001 21	Brescia	0–1	Lazio	Brescia
20:30 CET (UTC+01:00)		Report	Salas 59'	Stadium: Stadio Mario Rigamonti; Attendance: 15,025; Referee: Gianluca Paparesta

11 March 2001 22	Bologna	2–0	Lazio	Bologna
15:00 CET (UTC+01:00)	Nervo 20'; Signori 76'	Report		Stadium: Stadio Renato Dall'Ara; Attendance: 25,725; Referee: Daniele Tombolini

18 March 2001 23	Lazio	4–1	Juventus	Rome
20:30 CET (UTC+01:00)	Nedvěd 23', 65'; Crespo 46', 81'	Report	Del Piero 59'	Stadium: Stadio Olimpico; Attendance: 68,641; Referee: Pierluigi Collina

1 April 2001 24	Milan	1–0	Lazio	Milan
20:30 CEST (UTC+02:00)	Boban 59'	Report		Stadium: San Siro; Attendance: 52,018; Referee: Stefano Farina

14 April 2001 26	Reggina	0–2	Lazio	Reggio Calabria
15:00 CEST (UTC+02:00)		Report	Crespo 16', 70'	Stadium: Stadio Oreste Granillo; Attendance: 23,234; Referee: Fiorenzo Treossi

18 April 2001 25	Lazio	1–0	Parma	Rome
20:30 CEST (UTC+02:00)	Thuram 12' (o.g.)	Report		Stadium: Stadio Olimpico; Attendance: 46,774; Referee: Domenico Messina
Note: Match was originally scheduled for the 7 April but was suspended at 7' due to heavy rain.

22 April 2001 27	Lazio	2–1	Vicenza	Rome
15:00 CEST (UTC+02:00)	Simeone 35'; Verón 85'	Report	Jeda 89'	Stadium: Stadio Olimpico; Attendance: 42,112; Referee: Daniele Tombolini

29 April 2001 28	Roma	2–2	Lazio	Rome
20:30 CEST (UTC+02:00)	Batistuta 48'; Delvecchio 54'	Report	Nedvěd 78'; Castromán 90'	Stadium: Stadio Olimpico; Attendance: 77,120; Referee: Stefano Braschi

6 May 2001 29	Lazio	2–0	Bari	Rome
15:00 CEST (UTC+02:00)	Verón 25', 41'	Report		Stadium: Stadio Olimpico; Attendance: 40,644; Referee: Daniele Tombolini

12 May 2001 30	Napoli	2–4	Lazio	Naples
15:00 CEST (UTC+02:00)	Amoruso 24', 46'	Report	Crespo 32', 51'; Nedvěd 65'; Ravanelli 89'	Stadium: Stadio San Paolo; Attendance: 32,007; Referee: Gennaro Borriello

20 May 2001 31	Lazio	3–1	Udinese	Florence
15:00 CEST (UTC+02:00)	Crespo 3', 16'; Castromán 84'	Report	Fiore 68' (pen.)	Stadium: Stadio Artemio Franchi; Attendance: 25,000; Referee: Alberto Castellani

27 May 2001 32	Internazionale	1–1	Lazio	Bari
20:30 CEST (UTC+02:00)	Dalmat 90'	Report	Crespo 41'	Stadium: Stadio San Nicola; Attendance: 13,000; Referee: Pierluigi Collina

10 June 2001 33	Lazio	3–0	Fiorentina	Rome
15:00 CEST (UTC+02:00)	Pierini 34' (o.g.); Crespo 44'; Negro 55'	Report		Stadium: Stadio Olimpico; Attendance: 42,052; Referee: Pierluigi Collina

17 June 2001 34	Lecce	2–1	Lazio	Lecce
15:00 CEST (UTC+02:00)	Vasari 46', 72'	Report	Crespo 45' (pen.)	Stadium: Stadio Via del Mare; Attendance: 30,201; Referee: Salvatore Racalbuto

=== Coppa Italia ===
==== Round of 16 ====
16 September 2000 First leg	Sampdoria	1–1	Lazio	Genoa
18:00 CEST (UTC+02:00)	Flachi 82'		Salas 7'; Gottardi (red card) 64'	Stadium: Stadio Luigi Ferraris; Attendance: 13,351; Referee: Domenico Messina

24 September 2000 Second leg	Lazio	5–2 (6–3 agg.)	Sampdoria	Rome
17:30 CEST (UTC+02:00)	Lombardo 39', 40'; Ravanelli 48', 83' (pen.); Sensini 65'		Vasari 17'; Flachi 73'	Stadium: Stadio Olimpico; Attendance: 13,720; Referee: Emilio Pellegrino

==== Quarter-finals ====
29 November 2000 First leg	Lazio	2–1	Udinese	Rome
20:30 CET (UTC+01:00)	Stanković 86'; Nedvěd 87'		Margiotta 48'	Stadium: Stadio Olimpico; Attendance: 4,875; Referee: Salvatore Racalbuto

12 December 2000 Second leg	Udinese	4–1 (5–3 agg.)	Lazio	Udine
21:00 CET (UTC+01:00)	Sottil 2'; Margiotta 8', 80'; Walem 90'		Mihajlović 21' (pen.)	Stadium: Stadio Friuli; Referee: Stefano Farina

=== UEFA Champions League ===
==== Group stage ====
Pos	Team	Pld	W	D	L	GF	GA	GD	Pts	Qualification
1	(England) Arsenal	6	4	1	1	11	8	+3	13	Advance to second group stage
2	(Italy) Lazio	6	4	1	1	13	4	+9	13	Advance to second group stage
3	(Ukraine) Shakhtar Donetsk	6	2	0	4	10	15	−5	6	Transfer to UEFA Cup
4	(Czech Republic) Sparta Prague	6	1	0	5	6	13	−7	3	

Source: UEFA

12 September 2000 1	Shakhtar Donetsk (Ukraine)	0–3	(Italy) Lazio	Donetsk, Ukraine
20:45 CEST (UTC+02:00)	Atelkin (yellow card) 56'	Report	López 27', (yellow card) 73'; Nedvěd (yellow card) 42', (goal) 68'; S. Inzaghi 78'	Stadium: Centralny Stadion; Attendance: 31,511; Referee: Michel Piraux (Belgium)

20 September 2000 2	Lazio (Italy)	3–0	(Czech Republic) Sparta Prague	Rome, Italy
20:45 CEST (UTC+02:00)	S. Inzaghi 35', 70'; Simeone (yellow card) 56', (goal) 58'	Report	Siegl (yellow card) 86'	Stadium: Stadio Olimpico; Attendance: 45,100; Referee: Kyros Vassaras (Greece)

27 September 2000 3	Arsenal (England)	2–0	(Italy) Lazio	London, England
20:45 CEST (UTC+02:00)	Henry (yellow card) 22'; Ljungberg 42', 56'; Keown (yellow card) 60'; Parlour (yellow card) 66'	Report	Stanković (yellow card) 37'	Stadium: Highbury; Attendance: 34,521; Referee: José María García-Aranda (Spain)

17 October 2000 4	Lazio (Italy)	1–1	(England) Arsenal	Rome, Italy
20:45 CEST (UTC+02:00)	Nedvěd 24', (yellow card) 49'; Nesta (yellow card) 56'; Verón (yellow card) 67'	Report	Ljungberg (yellow card) 43'; Keown (yellow card) 56'; Pires 88'	Stadium: Stadio Olimpico; Attendance: 40,151; Referee: Hellmut Krug (Germany)

25 October 2000 5	Lazio (Italy)	5–1	(Ukraine) Shakhtar Donetsk	Rome, Italy
20:45 CEST (UTC+02:00)	Baronio (yellow card) 38'; López 48', 68', 90+3'; Favalli 54'; Verón 57'	Report	Vorobey 41'; Popov (yellow card) 61'	Stadium: Stadio Olimpico; Attendance: 14,746; Referee: Alain Sars (France)

7 November 2000 6	Sparta Prague (Czech Republic)	0–1	(Italy) Lazio	Prague, Czech Republic
20:45 CET (UTC+01:00)	Novotný (yellow card) 42'	Report	Baronio (yellow card) 16'; Ravanelli 42', (yellow card) 44'	Stadium: Stadion Letná; Attendance: 19,414; Referee: Arturo Daudén Ibáñez (Spain)

==== Second group stage ====
Pos	Team	Pld	W	D	L	GF	GA	GD	Pts	Qualification
1	(Spain) Real Madrid	6	4	1	1	14	9	+5	13	Advance to knockout stage
2	(England) Leeds United	6	3	1	2	12	10	+2	10	Advance to knockout stage
3	(Belgium) Anderlecht	6	2	0	4	7	12	−5	6	
4	(Italy) Lazio	6	1	2	3	9	11	−2	5	

Source: UEFA

22 November 2000 1	Anderlecht (Belgium)	1–0	(Italy) Lazio	Brussels, Belgium
20:45 CET (UTC+01:00)	Radzinski 83'	Report		Stadium: Constant Vanden Stock Stadium; Attendance: 21,631; Referee: Ľuboš Micheľ (Slovakia)

5 December 2000 2	Lazio (Italy)	0–1	(England) Leeds United	Rome, Italy
20:45 CET (UTC+01:00)		Report	Smith 80'	Stadium: Stadio Olimpico; Attendance: 26,503; Referee: Claude Colombo (France)

13 February 2001 3	Real Madrid (Spain)	3–2	(Italy) Lazio	Madrid, Spain
20:45 CET (UTC+01:00)	Morientes 32'; Helguera 82'; Figo 89' (pen.)	Report	Crespo 4'; Gottardi 84'	Stadium: Santiago Bernabéu; Attendance: 72,500; Referee: Gilles Veissière (France)

21 February 2001 4	Lazio (Italy)	2–2	(Spain) Real Madrid	Rome, Italy
20:45 CET (UTC+01:00)	Nedvěd 4'; Crespo 53'	Report	Solari 32'; Raúl 73'	Stadium: Stadio Olimpico; Attendance: 50,223; Referee: Vítor Melo Pereira (Portugal)

6 March 2001 5	Lazio (Italy)	2–1	(Belgium) Anderlecht	Rome, Italy
20:45 CET (UTC+01:00)	López 40'; Baronio 77'	Report	Stoica 49'	Stadium: Stadio Olimpico; Attendance: 8,368; Referee: Juan Fernández Marin (Spain)

14 March 2001 6	Leeds United (England)	3–3	(Italy) Lazio	Leeds, England
20:45 CET (UTC+01:00)	Bowyer 28'; Wilcox 43'; Viduka 62'	Report	Ravanelli 21'; Mihajlović 29' (pen.), 90+3'	Stadium: Elland Road; Attendance: 36,741; Referee: Konrad Plautz (Austria)

== Statistics ==
=== Players statistics ===
No.	Pos	Nat	Player	Total		Serie A		Coppa		Champions League	
No.	Pos	Nat	Player	Apps	Goals	Apps	Goals	Apps	Goals	Apps	Goals
70	GK	(Italy) ITA	Peruzzi	36	-33	29	-24	0	0	7	-9
15	DF	(Italy) ITA	Pancaro	42	0	25+6	0	1	0	10	0
13	DF	(Italy) ITA	Nesta	38	0	29	0	1	0	8	0
2	DF	(Italy) ITA	Negro	32	1	23+1	1	3	0	5	0
19	DF	(Italy) ITA	Favalli	36	1	24+3	0	3	0	6	1
23	MF	(Argentina) ARG	Veron	31	4	22	3	2	0	7	1
4	MF	(Italy) ITA	Dino Baggio	26	1	25	1	1	0		
14	MF	(Argentina) ARG	Simeone	40	3	23+7	2	2	0	8	1
18	MF	(Czech Republic) CZE	Nedved	45	13	24+7	9	4	1	10	3
9	FW	(Chile) CHI	Salas	32	8	15+6	7	2	1	9	0
10	FW	(Argentina) ARG	Crespo	39	28	32	26	1	0	6	2
1	GK	(Italy) ITA	Marchegiani	17	-26	5+3	-12	4	-8	5	-6
6	MF	(Czech Republic) CZE	Poborsky	19	1	18+1	1				
24	DF	(Portugal) POR	Couto	30	0	17+1	0	4	0	8	0
11	DF	(Federal Republic of Yugoslavia) YUG	Mihajlovic	28	7	17+1	4	2	1	8	2
7	FW	(Argentina) ARG	Lopez	22	5	11+5	0	0	0	6	5
20	MF	(Federal Republic of Yugoslavia) YUG	Stankovic	32	1	10+11	0	2	1	9	0
8	MF	(Italy) ITA	Baronio	20	1	6+6	0	1	0	7	1
35	MF	(Argentina) ARG	Castroman	13	2	3+7	2	0	0	3	0
25	MF	(Italy) ITA	Lombardo	20	2	3+6	0	4	2	7	0
33	DF	(Italy) ITA	Colonnese	12	0	2+2	0	4	0	4	0
32	FW	(Italy) ITA	Ravanelli	21	6	1+10	2	4	2	6	2
6	DF	(Argentina) ARG	Sensini	6	1	1	0	2	1	3	0
21	FW	(Italy) ITA	Inzaghi	23	7	0+13	4	1	0	9	3
17	DF	(Italy) ITA	Gottardi	8	1	0+3	0	2	0	3	1
16	DF	(Italy) ITA	Pesaresi	9	0	0+2	0	4	0	3	0
22	GK	(Italy) ITA	Orlandoni	1	0	0+1	0				
34	DF	(Italy) ITA	Berrettoni	3	0	0	0	2	0	1	0
26	DF	(Italy) ITA	Domizzi	0	0	0	0				
28	DF	(Italy) ITA	Luciani	2	0	0	0	0	0	2	0
5	DF	(Ghana) GHA	Ola	0	0	0	0	0	0	0	0
29	DF	(Italy) ITA	Ruggiu	2	0	0	0	0	0	2	0
