= 2000 Supercoppa Italiana =

- Event: Supercoppa Italiana
Lazio	Inter Milan
Serie A	Coppa Italia
4	3
- Date: 8 September 2000
- Venue: Stadio Olimpico, Rome
- Referee: Stefano Farina
- Attendance: 61,446

The 2000 Supercoppa Italiana was a match contested by the 1999–2000 Serie A winners Lazio and the 1999–2000 Coppa Italia runners-up Inter Milan. Since the Coppa Italia winners were also the newly appointed league champions, the Super Cup spot was given to the runners-up of the Coppa Italia, Inter Milan

The match resulted in a 4–3 win for Lazio.

== Match details ==
8 September 2000
20:45 CET

Lazio	4–3	Inter Milan
López 33', 38'; Mihajlović 47' (pen.); Stanković 74'	Report	Keane 2'; Farinós 61'; Vampeta 75'

Stadio Olimpico, Rome
Attendance: 61,446
Referee: Stefano Farina

Lazio	Inter Milan

LAZIO:
GK	70	(Italy) Angelo Peruzzi
RB	15	(Italy) Giuseppe Pancaro		(substituted off) 69'
CB	13	(Italy) Alessandro Nesta (c)
CB	11	(Federal Republic of Yugoslavia) Siniša Mihajlović
LB	19	(Italy) Giuseppe Favalli
RM	20	(Federal Republic of Yugoslavia) Dejan Stanković		(substituted off) 81'
CM	14	(Argentina) Diego Simeone
CM	23	(Argentina) Juan Sebastián Verón
LM	18	(Czech Republic) Pavel Nedvěd		(substituted off) 54'
CF	10	(Argentina) Hernán Crespo
CF	7	(Argentina) Claudio López
Substitutes:
GK	1	(Italy) Luca Marchegiani
DF	17	(Switzerland) Guerino Gottardi		(substituted in) 69'
DF	33	(Italy) Francesco Colonnese
MF	6	(Argentina) Néstor Sensini	Booked	(substituted in) 54'
MF	16	(Italy) Emanuele Pesaresi
MF	25	(Italy) Attilio Lombardo		(substituted in) 81'
FW	21	(Italy) Simone Inzaghi
Manager:
(Sweden) Sven-Göran Eriksson

INTER:
GK	22	(Italy) Marco Ballotta (c)
RB	6	(Italy) Michele Serena
CB	2	(Colombia) Iván Córdoba
CB	17	(Ivory Coast) Cyril Domoraud
LB	3	(Italy) Fabio Macellari	Booked
CM	25	(Brazil) Vampeta
CM	31	(Spain) Javier Farinós
CM	8	(Federal Republic of Yugoslavia) Vladimir Jugović		(substituted off) 60'
AM	10	(Netherlands) Clarence Seedorf		(substituted off) 86'
CF	54	(Turkey) Hakan Şükür
CF	7	(Republic of Ireland) Robbie Keane		Booked
Substitutes:
GK	12	(Italy) Marco Varaldi
DF	16	(Italy) Riccardo Fissore
DF	37	(France) Anther Yahia
MF	14	(Italy) Luigi Di Biagio
MF	15	(France) Benoît Cauet
MF	24	(Argentina) Sixto Peralta		(substituted in) 60'
FW	27	(Italy) Corrado Colombo		(substituted in) 86'
Manager:
(Italy) Marcello Lippi

MATCH OFFICIALS

- Assistant referees:
- Fourth official:

MATCH RULES

- 90 minutes.
- 30 minutes of extra-time if necessary.
- Penalty shoot-out if scores still level.
- Seven named substitutes
- Maximum of 3 substitutions.

== See also ==
- 2000–01 Inter Milan season
- 2000–01 SS Lazio season
