= Pesaresi =

Pesaresi is an Italian surname. Notable people with the surname include:

- Emanuele Pesaresi (born 1976), Italian footballer
- Nicola Pesaresi (born 1991), Italian volleyball player
