= Doga =

Doga may refer to:

- Doga (album), a 2025 studio album by Juana Molina
- Doga language, an Oceanic language of Papua New Guinea
- Doga (yoga), dog yoga
- Doga Gewog, a village block of Paro District, Bhutan
- Doga (Baill.) Baill. ex Nakai, a synonym of Storckiella Seem.

== People ==
- Alessandro Doga (born 1975), Italian footballer
- Eugen Doga (1937–2025), Moldovan composer

== Fictional characters ==
- Doga, also known as Dorga, a character in Final Fantasy III
- Doga (comics), a character in Raj Comics
- Doga, an evil witch in Pucca; See List of characters in Pucca
