= Simone Inzaghi =

Italian football manager (born 1976)

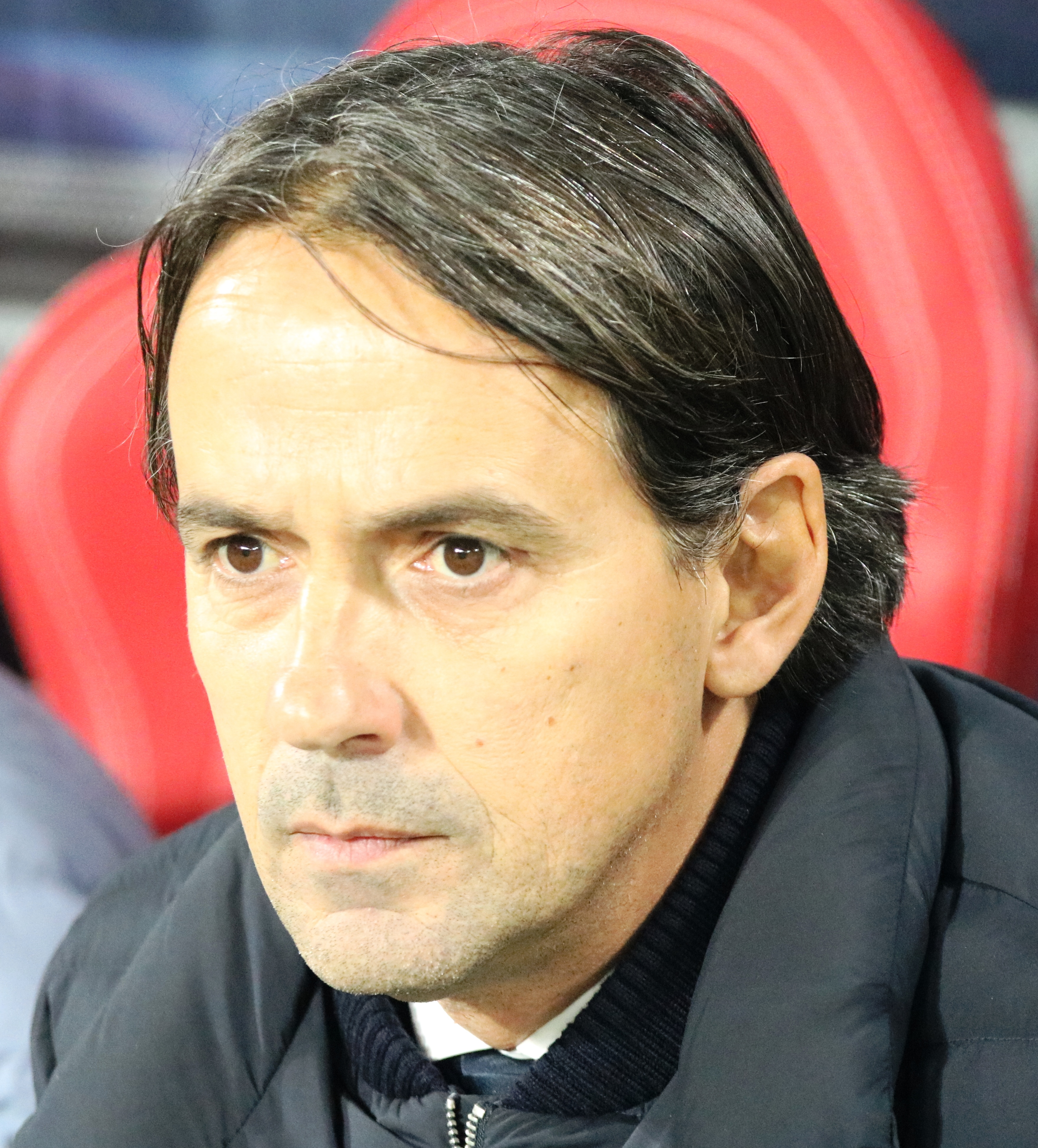
- Inzaghi with Inter Milan in 2023

Personal information
- Full name: Simone Inzaghi
- Date of birth: 5 April 1976 (age 50)
- Place of birth: Piacenza, Italy
- Height: 1.85 m (6 ft 1 in)
- Position: Striker

Team information
- Current team: Al-Hilal (head coach)

Youth career
- 1992–1994: Piacenza

Senior career*
| Years | Team | Apps | (Gls) |
| 1994–1999 | Piacenza | 30 | (15) |
| 1994–1995 | → Carpi (loan) | 9 | (0) |
| 1995–1996 | → Novara (loan) | 23 | (4) |
| 1996–1997 | → Lumezzane (loan) | 23 | (6) |
| 1997–1998 | → Brescello (loan) | 21 | (10) |
| 1999–2010 | Lazio | 133 | (28) |
| 2005 | → Sampdoria (loan) | 5 | (0) |
| 2007–2008 | → Atalanta (loan) | 19 | (0) |
| Total | | 263 | (63) |

International career
| 1993–1994 | Italy U18 | 4 | (1) |
| 2000–2003 | Italy | 3 | (0) |

Managerial career
- 2016–2021: Lazio
- 2021–2025: Inter Milan
- 2025–: Al Hilal
- * Club domestic league appearances and goals

Simone Inzaghi (Italian pronunciation: [siˈmoːne inˈdzaːɡi]; born 5 April 1976) is an Italian professional football manager and former player who is currently the head coach of Saudi Pro League club Al-Hilal. Nicknamed "il Demone di Piacenza" (lit. 'the Demon of Piacenza') because of his ability to find unexpected tactical solutions and his verbal and non-verbal coaching communication style, Inzaghi is known for helping revive the 3–5–2 tactical setup.

Inzaghi began his playing career in 1994 with Piacenza but was loaned to several clubs, including Novara and Lumezzane, where he won back-to-back Serie C2 titles in 1996 and 1997. Inzaghi signed for Lazio in 1999 and won one Serie A title, three Coppa Italia titles, one Supercoppa Italiana, and one UEFA Super Cup. He also played for Sampdoria and Atalanta on loan before retiring in 2010. At international level, Inzaghi earned three caps for Italy between 2000 and 2003.

Inzaghi began his senior coaching career with Lazio in 2016, after previously being in charge of the club's youth teams from 2010, and won one Coppa Italia and two Supercoppas Italiana. Inzaghi joined Inter Milan in 2021 and won one Serie A title, two Coppa Italia titles, three consecutive Supercoppas Italiana, and reached the UEFA Champions League final in 2023 and 2025. He then signed with Al-Hilal in 2025.

== Playing career ==
=== Club ===
Inzaghi started playing professionally in 1993 with hometown club Piacenza, although he did not get to feature in any matches with the first team in that season. The following year, he was loaned out to third division side Carpi; his first goal arrived in 1995–96, whilst at the service of Novara in the fourth level. After two more loan stints, at Lumezzane and Brescello, Inzaghi returned to Piacenza for the 1998–99 Serie A season, which would be his first in the top-flight of Italian football. He scored 15 goals in 30 matches and secured a transfer to Lazio.

Despite stiff competition within a Lazio side packed with quality strikers such as Marcelo Salas and Alen Bokšić, the rotation policy of manager Sven-Göran Eriksson ensured that Inzaghi would get playing time; he appeared in 22 out of 34 Serie A matches in Lazio's highly successful 1999–2000 season scoring seven goals, as his team went on to complete the domestic Double by winning both the Scudetto and the Coppa Italia. In the Champions League, as Lazio progressed from both the first and the second group stages to reach the quarter-finals, Inzaghi scored nine goals in eleven games (including four in a single game against Marseille on 14 March 2000, equalling the competition record held by Marco van Basten since 1992).

The following seasons were not as successful, but Inzaghi did help Lazio conquer another Coppa Italia, in 2003–04; in September of that year, he extended his contract until June 2009. Inzaghi spent the latter half of the 2004–05 season with Sampdoria, as part of a six-month player exchange with Fabio Bazzani. He returned to Lazio for the 2005–06 campaign and stayed for the following, with only 12 appearances combined. The following season, Inzaghi joined Atalanta on loan. Although he struggled to find his form early on, he managed to play in 19 league matches, mostly as a second-half substitute, but did not find the net.

Inzaghi returned to Lazio in 2008–09, despite not being in the plans of manager Delio Rossi. A move away did not materialise and Inzaghi made his comeback in a 2–0 Cup win over former team Atalanta; the season would end with Lazio winning the Coppa Italia, Inzaghi's third triumph in this competition, although he did not get to play in the final. In the Serie A, Inzaghi made his first league appearance of the season in October, coming from the bench and scoring an equaliser two minutes from time to rescue a point against Lecce, in a 1–1 home draw; it was his first Serie A goal since September 2004, but he would only appear in 12 games over two years, choosing to retire in the summer of 2010 at the age of 34.

=== International ===
Inzaghi played three times for Italy, in friendly matches. His first appearance came under Dino Zoff on 29 March 2000, in a 0–2 away loss against Spain in Barcelona. He came on in the 60th minute for Stefano Fiore, partnering his older brother Filippo upfront; he made two more appearances for his country under Giovanni Trapattoni, in a 1–0 win over England in Turin on 15 November later the same year and in another 1–0 win against Romania in Ancona, on 16 November 2003.

== Style of play ==
Throughout his career, Inzaghi's playing style was compared to that of his older brother Filippo and Paolo Rossi. Although he was not particularly skillful from a technical standpoint, he was a tall and fast striker with a slender physique, who was mainly known for his eye for goal, ability to play on the edge of the offside trap and clinical finishing inside the penalty area, in particular from close range, due to his opportunism and positional sense.

== Managerial career ==
=== Lazio ===
Following his retirement, Inzaghi remained with Lazio, managing its Allievi and Primavera sides. On 3 April 2016, he was appointed to the senior team on an interim basis following the sacking of Stefano Pioli.

For the 2016–17 season, Inzaghi was originally replaced by Marcelo Bielsa. However, as the Argentine left his post after less than one week due to undisclosed reasons, he was named as permanent manager. He guided the team to fifth place in the domestic league as well as the final of the Italian Cup, lost to Juventus; on 7 June 2017, he renewed his contract until 2020.

The 2017–18 campaign started on a high note, as Lazio defeated Juventus in the Supercoppa Italiana with a 3–2 result. They again finished fifth in Serie A, missing out on Champions League qualification on the final matchday after a 2–3 home loss to Internazionale.

The 2018–19 season saw the side win the domestic cup 2–0 over Atalanta, conquering their seventh title overall and automatically qualifying for the group stage of the UEFA Europa League.

On 22 December 2019, Inzaghi captured his second Supercoppa Italiana title with Lazio, following a 3–1 victory over Juventus.

In the 2019–20 Serie A season, he led Lazio to finish fourth, which earned them the right to play in the 2020–21 UEFA Champions League, for the first time since 2007–08. Lazio managed to reach the round of 16 in the 2020–21 Champions League.

=== Inter Milan ===
On 27 May 2021, following reports linking him as the next manager of Inter Milan, Lazio confirmed that Inzaghi had officially left the club. On 3 June 2021, Inzaghi signed a two-year contract as coach of Inter.

In his first season as Inter manager, Inzaghi won the Supercoppa Italiana on 12 January 2022 and the Coppa Italia on 11 May 2022, defeating Juventus at the end of extra-time in both cases, respectively 2–1 at San Siro and 4–2 at Stadio Olimpico. He finished the Serie A championship in second place, being the most prolific attacking side with 84 goals, and the Champions League campaign in the round of sixteen, being eliminated by Liverpool with a 1–2 on aggregate (2–0 defeat at San Siro and 1–0 win at Anfield).

In his second season, despite an inconsistent Serie A campaign which saw Napoli stroll to the title, he did once again secure the Supercoppa Italiana and guided Inter to another Coppa Italia title. But, perhaps his most notable achievement was getting Inter into the Champions League Final for the first time in 13 years, after a memorable knock-out stage run which included a 3–0 aggregate victory over local rivals A.C. Milan in the semi-finals. However, Inter lost 1–0 to Manchester City in the final. On 5 September 2023, Inzaghi extended his contract with Inter until 2025.

On 15 January 2024, Inzaghi placed third in the 2023 Best FIFA Men's Coach award, behind winner Pep Guardiola and compatriot Luciano Spalletti. On 22 April 2024, Inzaghi won the 2023–24 Serie A with Inter after a 2–1 away win in the Derby della Madonnina. On 6 May 2025, Inzaghi led Inter to its seventh Champions League final with his team defeating Barcelona 7–6 on aggregate, also making it his second Champions League final as a coach in three years. Inter lost the 2024–25 Serie A title on the final matchday, finishing one point behind Napoli, and suffered a 5–0 defeat to Paris Saint-Germain in the Champions League final.

On 3 June 2025, Inzaghi left Inter by mutual consent.

=== Al-Hilal ===
On 4 June 2025, Inzaghi was appointed as manager of Al-Hilal, signing a two-year contract. Inzaghi's first game in charge of Al-Hilal ended in a 1–1 draw with Real Madrid in the FIFA Club World Cup. Inzaghi's first win in charge of Al-Hilal came in the third match of the group stage, a 2–0 win over Pachuca which confirmed the clubs advancement to the knockout stages of the Club World Cup. Inzaghi earned praise after leading Al-Hilal to a 4–3 extra time win over defending champions Manchester City in the Round of 16 of the Club World Cup. Al Hilal would then exit the tournament in the quarter finals after losing 2–1 to Fluminense.

== Style of management ==
In Rome, Inzaghi built a reputation for getting the most out of his players. He is known for deploying a 3–5–2 formation with wing-backs that like to get forward and join in the attacking play. In his preferred formation, two central strikers are supported by an attacking midfielder who sits just in front of the other two players in midfield. It is a tactically fluid system which appears like a 5–3–2 out of possession as the wing-backs drop back into defence. Inzaghi is also known for his versatility in how he sets his team up to defend. During his spell at Lazio, he implemented both a high press and a mid-block to win the ball back when their opponents were in possession. In 2022, Francesco Porzio of CBS Soccer noted that Inzaghi gave his players more freedom tactically than his predecessor Antonio Conte, which had a positive impact on the team's performances. Inzaghi's tactical approach at Inter in the lead-up to the 2023 Champions League final against Pep Guardiola's Manchester City was described as "reactive" by Miguel Delaney of The Independent, who noted that it was "difficult to identify patterns or trends in Inter’s play" under Inzaghi, and as such, preparing to face Inzaghi's teams posed challenges for opposing managers, as they were difficult to read. Beyond his tactical prowess, Inzaghi has also been praised for his leadership qualities as a manager, with James Horncastle of BBC Sport also noting in 2023 that he "is adaptable, a good man-manager and someone who manages moments in games".

== Personal life ==
Born in Piacenza, Emilia-Romagna, Simone Inzaghi is the younger brother of Filippo Inzaghi, who also became a footballer and striker.

On 14 May 2000, as Lazio unexpectedly won the Scudetto on the final matchday in a close title race, Inzaghi also found himself indirectly competing against his older brother, Filippo, who was at the time playing for Juventus in the away game against Perugia, which resulted in the infamous 1–0 defeat, which allowed Lazio to surpass Juventus in the first spot during the last hour of the competition. While Simone scored the opening goal from the penalty spot in the 3–0 historic win against Reggina, Filippo failed to make a difference in Perugia as Juventus lost the title race at its finish.

Simone Inzaghi was in a relationship with actress and television presenter Alessia Marcuzzi until 2004. They have one son, born in 2001. He married Gaia Lucariello on 3 June 2018, and they have two sons.

== Career statistics ==
=== Club ===
Appearances and goals by club, season and competition
| Club | Season | League | | | Coppa Italia | | Europe | | Other | | Total | |
| Club | Season | Division | Apps | Goals | Apps | Goals | Apps | Goals | Apps | Goals | Apps | Goals |
|---|---|---|---|---|---|---|---|---|---|---|---|---|
| Piacenza | 1993–94 | Serie A | 0 | 0 | – | | – | | – | | 0 | 0 |
| Piacenza | 1997–98 | Serie A | 0 | 0 | 1 | 0 | – | | – | | 1 | 0 |
| Piacenza | 1998–99 | Serie A | 30 | 15 | 0 | 0 | – | | – | | 30 | 15 |
| Piacenza | Total | | 30 | 15 | 1 | 0 | – | | – | | 31 | 15 |
| Carpi (loan) | 1994–95 | Serie C1 | 9 | 0 | – | | – | | – | | 9 | 0 |
| Novara (loan) | 1995–96 | Serie C2 | 23 | 4 | – | | – | | – | | 23 | 4 |
| Lumezzane (loan) | 1996–97 | Serie C2 | 23 | 6 | – | | – | | – | | 23 | 6 |
| Brescello (loan) | 1997–98 | Serie C1 | 21 | 10 | – | | – | | – | | 21 | 10 |
| Lazio | 1999–2000 | Serie A | 22 | 7 | 6 | 3 | 11 (Note: Appearances in UEFA Champions League) | 9 | 1 (Note: Appearance in UEFA Super Cup) | 0 | 40 | 19 |
| Lazio | 2000–01 | Serie A | 13 | 4 | 1 | 0 | 9 | 3 | 0 | 0 | 23 | 7 |
| Lazio | 2001–02 | Serie A | 20 | 5 | 2 | 1 | 6 | 0 | – | | 28 | 6 |
| Lazio | 2002–03 | Serie A | 18 | 4 | 3 | 1 | 8 (Note: Appearances in UEFA Cup) | 4 | – | | 29 | 9 |
| Lazio | 2003–04 | Serie A | 23 | 6 | 4 | 1 | 5 | 3 | – | | 32 | 10 |
| Lazio | 2004–05 | Serie A | 12 | 1 | 1 | 0 | 3 | 1 | 0 | 0 | 16 | 2 |
| Lazio | 2005–06 | Serie A | 7 | 0 | 2 | 1 | 0 | 0 | – | | 9 | 1 |
| Lazio | 2006–07 | Serie A | 5 | 0 | 0 | 0 | – | | – | | 5 | 0 |
| Lazio | 2008–09 | Serie A | 9 | 1 | 1 | 0 | – | | – | | 10 | 1 |
| Lazio | 2009–10 | Serie A | 3 | 0 | 0 | 0 | 0 | 0 | 0 | 0 | 3 | 0 |
| Lazio | Total | | 133 | 28 | 20 | 7 | 42 | 20 | 1 | 0 | 196 | 55 |
| Sampdoria (loan) | 2004–05 | Serie A | 5 | 0 | 2 | 0 | – | | – | | 7 | 0 |
| Atalanta (loan) | 2007–08 | Serie A | 19 | 0 | 0 | 0 | – | | – | | 19 | 0 |
| Career total | | | 262 | 63 | 23 | 7 | 42 | 20 | 1 | 0 | 328 | 90 |

=== International ===
Italy
| Year | Apps | Goals |
|---|---|---|
| 2000 | 2 | 0 |
| 2001 | 0 | 0 |
| 2002 | 0 | 0 |
| 2003 | 1 | 0 |
| Total | 3 | 0 |

== Managerial statistics ==
As of match played 3 November 2026

Managerial record by team and tenure
| Team | Nat. | From | To | Record | | | | | | | |
| Team | Nat. | From | To | G | W | D | L | GF | GA | GD | Win % |
|---|---|---|---|---|---|---|---|---|---|---|---|
| Lazio | (Italy) | 3 April 2016 | 27 May 2021 | 251 | 134 | 45 | 72 | 463 | 325 | +138 | 53.39 |
| Inter Milan | (Italy) | 1 July 2021 | 3 June 2025 | 217 | 141 | 41 | 35 | 425 | 188 | +237 | 64.98 |
| Al Hilal | (Saudi Arabia) | 5 June 2025 | present | 69 | 52 | 14 | 3 | 163 | 58 | +105 | 75.36 |
| Total | | | | 533 | 324 | 100 | 109 | 1,040 | 568 | +472 | 60.79 |

== Honours ==
=== Player ===
Novara

- Serie C2: 1995–96

Lumezzane

- Serie C2: 1996–97

Lazio

- Serie A: 1999–2000
- Coppa Italia: 1999–2000, 2003–04, 2008–09
- Supercoppa Italiana: 2000
- UEFA Super Cup: 1999

=== Manager ===
Lazio

- Coppa Italia: 2018–19; runner-up: 2016–17
- Supercoppa Italiana: 2017, 2019

Inter Milan

- Serie A: 2023–24
- Coppa Italia: 2021–22, 2022–23
- Supercoppa Italiana: 2021, 2022, 2023
- UEFA Champions League runner-up: 2022–23, 2024–25

Al Hilal

- King's Cup: 2025–26

Individual

- Serie A Coach of the Month: December 2021, October 2023, January 2024, April 2024, December 2024
- Enzo Bearzot Award: 2024
- Premio Bulgarelli Number 8 Best Serie A Coach: 2023–24
- Serie A Most Valuable Coach: 2023–24
- Serie A Coach of the Year: 2024
- Panchina d'Oro: 2023–24

== See also ==
- List of European association football families
