= Damián Macaluso =

Uruguayan footballer (born 1980)

Personal information
- Full name: Damián Macaluso Rojas
- Date of birth: 9 March 1980 (age 46)
- Place of birth: Montevideo, Uruguay
- Height: 1.81 m (5 ft 11 in)
- Position: Centre back

Team information
- Current team: Peñarol (youth coach)

Senior career*
Years	Team	Apps	(Gls)
1997–1998	Central Español		
1999	Racing Montevideo		
1999–2000	Sampdoria	0	(0)
2000–2001	Catania	7	(0)
2001–2002	Bella Vista	23	(1)
2003	Central Español	5	(0)
2003–2004	Cobán Imperial	22	(1)
2004–2005	Venezia	30	(0)
2005–2006	Sambenedettese	30	(1)
2006–2010	AS Nancy	59	(4)
2010–2011	Veracruz	30	(2)
2011–2012	Gimnasia LP	23	(1)
2012–2015	Peñarol	47	(4)
2015–2016	Liverpool Montevideo	24	(0)
2016–2017	Juventud	31	(2)
2017–2020	Montevideo Wanderers	66	(4)

Managerial career
- 2022–: Peñarol (youth)
- * Club domestic league appearances and goals

Damián Macaluso Rojas (born 9 March 1980) is a Uruguayan football coach and a former player of Spanish and Italian descent who is the youth coach with Peñarol. He played as a defender.

Before joining AS Nancy in summer 2006, he also played for Racing Club de Montevideo, Club Atlético River Plate (Uruguay). He played in Guatemala for Cobán Imperial and helped them win the 2004 Clausura tournament.

In June 2012 he signed with Peñarol.
