= Giuliano Melosi =

Italian footballer

Personal information
- Date of birth: 15 May 1967 (age 59)
- Place of birth: Saronno, Italy
- Height: 1.73 m (5 ft 8 in)
- Position: Midfielder

Youth career
- Varese

Senior career*
Years	Team	Apps	(Gls)
1984–1989	Varese	92	(2)
1984–1985	→ Seregno (loan)	?	(?)
1989–1994	Pro Sesto	155	(13)
1994–1998	Chievo	122	(4)
1998–1999	Vicenza	6	(0)
1999	Pescara	15	(0)
1999–2000	Salernitana	29	(2)
2000–2001	Pescara	17	(0)
2001	Salernitana	17	(1)
2001–2002	Lecco	26	(3)
2002–2004	Pro Sesto	53	(2)
2004–2005	Palazzolo	15	(0)
2005	Bellinzona	9	(0)
2005–2006	Vigevano	24	(1)
2006–2008	Turate	62	(3)
2008–2009	Caronnese	30	(1)
Total		672	(32)

Managerial career
- 2008–2009: Caronnese
- 2009–2010: Insubria Gazzada Schianno
- 2011–2012: Pro Sesto
- 2012–2013: Darfo Boario
- 2013–2014: Borgomanero
- 2014–2015: Inveruno
- 2015–2016: Varese
- 2016–2017: Grumellese
- 2018: Brugherio
- 2019–2020: Pavia
- 2020: Ponte San Pietro
- 2022–2023: Folgore Caratese
- 2023–2024: Sestese
- * Club domestic league appearances and goals

Giuliano Melosi (born 15 May 1967) is an Italian former professional footballer and manager, who played as a midfielder.

== Playing career ==
A graduate of Varese youth and sectors, Melosi played for the club from 1984 to 1989, accumulating 92 appearances. He also played a large number of matches for Pro Sesto and Chievo Verona, teams for which he played in Serie B. Melosi played in the 1998–99 Serie A for LR Vicenza, and later played for teams in the lower divisions of Italian football, as well as AC Bellinzona in the Swiss second division.

== Managerial career ==
Melosi began his coaching career while still playing for Caronnese. He stood out in particular for Pro Sesto, where he promoted the club from Promozione to Serie D, and for Varese, where he was once again champion of the Eccellenza Lombardy. His most recent job was at Sestese, during the 2023–24 season.

== Honours ==
=== Manager ===
Pro Sesto

- Eccellenza: 2011–12 (Lombardy, group A)
- Promozione: 2010–11 (Lombardy, group C)

Varese

- Eccellenza: 2015–16 (Lombardy, group A)
