= Nicola Pagani =

Italian footballer (born 1977)

Personal information
- Full name: Nicola Carlo Pagani
- Date of birth: 9 November 1977 (age 49)
- Place of birth: Codogno, Italy
- Height: 1.85 m (6 ft 1 in)
- Position: Centre-back

Youth career
- Cremonese

Senior career*
| Years | Team | Apps | (Gls) |
| 1995–1997 | Pizzighettone | 31 | (0) |
| 1997–1998 | Reggina | 5 | (0) |
| 1998–2000 | Fermana | 53 | (1) |
| 2000–2001 | Reggina | 0 | (0) |
| 2000–2001 | → Pistoiese (loan) | 12 | (0) |
| 2001–2002 | Fermana | 25 | (0) |
| 2002–2004 | Reggina | 0 | (0) |
| 2002–2003 | → Cosenza (loan) | 7 | (0) |
| 2003 | → SPAL (loan) | 14 | (1) |
| 2003–2004 | → Pescara (loan) | 36 | (2) |
| 2004–2008 | Frosinone | 114 | (1) |
| 2008–2010 | Perugia | 53 | (2) |
| 2010–2011 | Pistoiese | 34 | (4) |
| 2012 | Pisa | 0 | (0) |
- * Club domestic league appearances and goals

Nicola Carlo Pagani (born 9 November 1977) is an Italian former footballer. Pagani played over 100 games in Italian second and third highest level.

== Biography ==
=== Early career ===
Born in Codogno, Lombardy, Pagani started his career at Cremonese. he then spent 2 seasons at Serie D club Pizzighettone.

=== Reggina and loans ===
In 1997–98 Serie B he joined Reggina. In mid-1998 he joined Fermana in co-ownership deal. In June 2000 he returned to Reggio Calabria. He was not included in the Serie A plan, and left for Pistoiese. In mid-2001 he left for Fermana in another co-ownership deal, along with Maurizio Nassi. Pagani returned to Reggio again in June 2002, and Nassi was sold to Fermana definitely. In July, he was transferred to Cosenza along with Stefano Casale. In January 2003 he left for Serie C1 club SPAL. Pagani left for Serie B club Pescara in July 2003, from Reggina.

=== Frosinone ===
In August 2004 he left for Frosinone. He finished as the losing semifinalists in 2005 but winning the promotion playoffs in 2006. He was the starting centre-backs along with Paolo Antonioli in 2005–06 Serie C1. He started over 25 games in 2006–07 and 2007–08 season and was the captain of the team.

=== Late career ===
On 1 September 2008, he joined Perugia of Lega Pro Prima Divisione. Despite the team finishing mid-table, the team folded in 2010.

In December 2010 he was re-signed by Pistoiese of Eccellenza Tuscany, winning the champion of the group.
