= Alessandro Evangelisti =

Italian footballer (born 1981)

Personal information
- Full name: Alessandro Evangelisti
- Date of birth: May 29, 1981 (age 45)
- Place of birth: Bologna, Italy
- Height: 1.83 m (6 ft 0 in)
- Position: Midfielder

Senior career*
Years	Team	Apps	(Gls)
1999–2002	Felsina San Lazzaro	62	(8)
2002–2003	Imolese	27	(2)
2003–2004	Boca San Lazzaro	8	(1)
2003–2005	Livorno	4	(0)
2004	→ Prato (loan)	13	(1)
2005–2006	SPAL	8	(0)
2005–2007	Boca San Lazzaro	47	(9)
2007–2008	San Marino Calcio	29	(2)
2008–2009	Sangiovannese	30	(4)
2009–2010	Olbia	15	(2)
2010	Potenza	10	(2)
- * Club domestic league appearances and goals as of 17:44, 23 April 2010 (UTC)

Alessandro Evangelisti (born 29 May 1981) is an Italian former footballer who played as a midfielder.
