= Luca Mazzoni =

Italian footballer

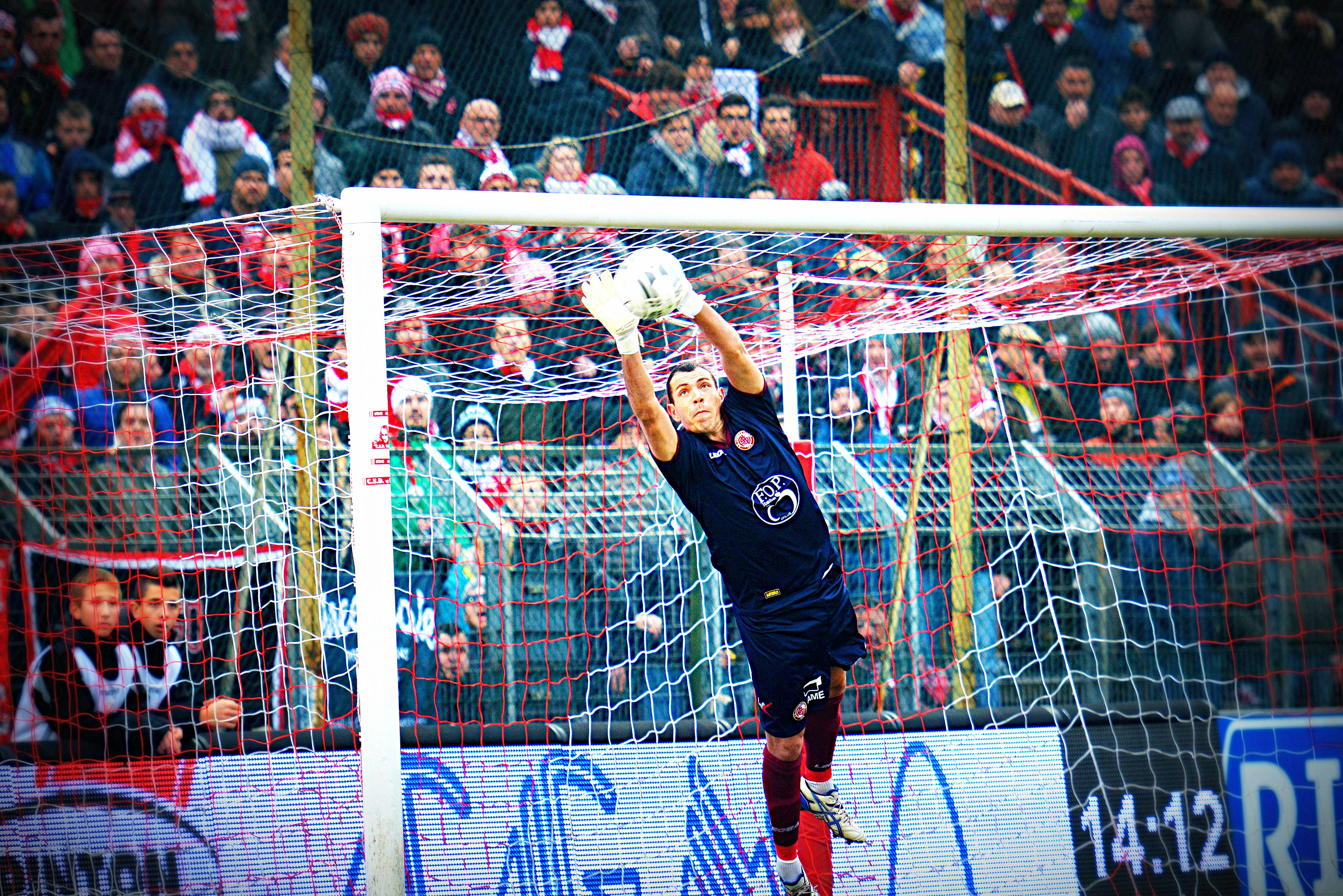
- Luca Mazzoni.jpg

Personal information
- Full name: Luca Mazzoni
- Date of birth: 29 March 1984 (age 42)
- Place of birth: Livorno, Italy
- Height: 1.86 m (6 ft 1 in)
- Position: Goalkeeper

Youth career
- Livorno

Senior career*
Years	Team	Apps	(Gls)
2004–2015	Livorno	73	(0)
2005–2006	→ Pavia (loan)	3	(0)
2006–2008	→ Lecco (loan)	57	(0)
2009–2010	→ Arezzo (loan)	26	(0)
2013–2014	→ Padova (loan)	27	(0)
2015–2016	Ternana	37	(0)
2016–2019	Livorno	80	(0)
- * Club domestic league appearances and goals as of 14:50, 23 July 2019 (UTC)

Luca Mazzoni (born 29 March 1984 in Livorno) is an Italian football goalkeeper. He last played for Livorno.

== Career ==
=== Livorno ===
After many year as backups, for Alfonso De Lucia (2008–2011), Francesco Bardi (2011–12) and Vincenzo Fiorillo (2012–13), Mazzoni was signed by Calcio Padova in a temporary deal in 2013. In 2014 Mazzoni returned to Livorno as the first choice. Mazzoni and Livorno agreed to terminate the contract in 2015.

=== Ternana ===
In 2015 Mazzoni was signed by Ternana in a 1+1 year contract, replacing Alberto Brignoli.

=== Back to Livorno ===
He returned to Livorno in 2016, as the first choice goalkeeper during the club's two Serie C campaigns, with the latter ending with promotion to Serie B. He was successively confirmed in his role for the 2018–19 Serie B season, but was suspended by the Italian Football Federation on 6 March 2019 after being found positive to cocaine following a routine drug test. On 23 July 2019 he was formally banned for four years from any football activities.
