= Mauro Briano =

Italian footballer

Personal information
- Date of birth: 8 March 1975 (age 51)
- Place of birth: Carmagnola, Italy
- Height: 1.75 m (5 ft 9 in)
- Position: Midfielder

Team information
- Current team: Savona

Youth career
- ?–1995: Torino

Senior career*
Years	Team	Apps	(Gls)
1995	Torino	2	(0)
1995–1998	Gualdo	48	(0)
1997	→ Foggia (loan)	4	(0)
1998–2001	Reggina	34	(0)
1999–2000	→ Savoia (co-ownership)	33	(1)
2000–2001	→ Monza (loan)	16	(0)
2001–2002	Lecco	28	(0)
2002–2003	Gualdo	31	(2)
2003–2004	Catanzaro	50	(0)
2005–2007	Triestina	82	(1)
2007–2008	Lucchese	30	(1)
2008–2010	Alessandria	59	(1)
2010–	Savona		

International career
1992	Italy U18	4	(0)
- * Club domestic league appearances and goals as of End of 2009-10 season

Mauro Briano (born 8 March 1975 in Carmagnola, Piedmont) is an Italian former footballer who played for Seconda Divisione club Savona. He spent most of his career at Serie B and Serie C1 (now Lega Pro Prima Divisione).

== Biography ==
Born in Carmagnola, the Province of Turin, Briano started his career at Torino and played his first Serie A match on 23 April 1995 against A.C. Milan.

He then left for Gualdo of Serie C1 and played for 3 seasons. In 1998, he was signed by Reggina Calcio (Serie B) and won promotion to Serie A. In 1999, he left for Serie B newcomer Savoia in co-ownership deal, but bought back by Reggina after Savoia relegated in June 2000. He then spent a season at Serie B struggler Monza and faced another relegation. In 2001, he first left for Cosenza then left for Lecco of Serie C1 in co-ownership deal. In 2002, he returned to Gualdo and played a season at Serie C2. In 2003, he left for Catanzaro of Serie C1 where he won the champion. In mid of Serie B 2004–05 he left for league rival Triestina.

In 2007-08 season, he played for Serie C1 side Lucchese and in next season for Alessandria.

In August 2010, he left for newly promoted Seconda Divisione club Savona.

=== International career ===
He played at 1993 UEFA European Under-18 Football Championship qualification.

== Honours ==
- Serie C1: 2003
