= Francesco Palmieri (footballer) =

Italian footballer (born 1967)

Personal information
- Date of birth: 24 September 1967 (age 59)
- Place of birth: Bari, Italy
- Height: 1.81 m (5 ft 11 in)
- Position: Forward

Senior career*
Years	Team	Apps	(Gls)
1986–1987	Bologna		
1987–1989	Centese		
1989–1992	Virtus Francavilla		
1992–1993	Baracca		
1994	Bologna		
1994–1995	Cosenza		
1995–1998	Lecce		
1998–2000	Sampdoria	64	(14)
2000	Piacenza	7	(0)
2000	Pescara	8	(2)
2001	Salernitana	13	(1)
2001–2003	Bari	39	(8)
- * Club domestic league appearances and goals

Francesco Palmieri (born 24 September 1967) is an Italian former professional footballer who is the sporting director at Sassuolo. He played as a forward.

== Playing career ==
Palmieri began his career with Centese, Virtus Francavilla, Baracca, Bologna, and Cosenza.

During his time at Lecce, Palmieri was given the nickname "Highlander". Between 1995 and 1998 he scored 35 goals in 102 appearances for the club. At Lecce, he formed a goal-scoring partnership with Cosimo Francioso and achieved two successive promotions, from Serie C to Serie A, under the guidance of manager Gian Piero Ventura.

In summer 1998 Sampdoria paid a transfer fee of three billion lire to Lecce to sign Palmieri. In the 1998–99 season he scored on his debut for Sampdoria, in a UEFA Intertoto Cup match, helping his club qualify for the third round of the competition. The goal also made him the first Italian player to score in the season. At the end of the 1998–99 season he suffered relegation to Serie B, having scored eight league goals.

In his second season at Sampdoria, he captained the team and scored six goals, while the club missed out on Serie A promotion by one point. At the end of the season, he suffered a serious muscle injury, which subsequently plagued him for more than a year.

== Managerial career ==
In November 2016, while working as academy manager at Sassuolo Palmieri was linked with the position of sporting director at Parma. For the 2021–22 season, he received the Mino Favini Award, which is awarded to the best youth sector manager.

At the end of the 2023–24 season, he was appointed sporting director of Sassuolo.

== Career statistics ==
Appearances and goals by club, season and competition
Club	Season	League			Coppa Italia		Europe		Total	
Club	Season	Division	Apps	Goals	Apps	Goals	Apps	Goals	Apps	Goals
Bologna	1986–87				2	0	–		2	0
Centese	1987–88				2	0	–		2	0
Lecce	1994–95						–			
Lecce	1995–96	Serie B	34	12	2	1	–		36	13
Lecce	1996–97	Serie A	32	10	4	1	–		36	11
Lecce	Total		66	22	6	2	0	0	72	24
Sampdoria	1998–99	Serie A	33	8	3	1	6 (Note: Appearance in UEFA Intertoto Cup)	4	42	13
Sampdoria	1999–2000	Serie B	31	6	3	2	–		34	8
Sampdoria	Total		64	14	6	3	6	4	76	21
Piacenza	2000–01	Serie B	7	0	4	0	–		11	0
Pescara	2000–01	Serie B	8	2	0	0	–		8	2
Salernitana	2000–01	Serie B	13	1	0	0	–		13	1
Bari	2001–02	Serie B	28	7	0	0	–		28	7
Bari	2002–03	Serie B	11	1	2	0	–		13	1
Bari	Total		39	8	2	0	0	0	41	8
Career total			197	47	22	5	6	4	224	56

== Honours ==
Individual

- Mino Favini Award: 2021–22
