= Stefano Casale =

Italian footballer

Personal information
- Date of birth: 13 February 1971 (age 55)
- Place of birth: Potenza, Italy
- Height: 1.80 m (5 ft 11 in)
- Position: Midfielder

Senior career*
Years	Team	Apps	(Gls)
1987–1991	Foggia	33	(3)
1991	Siena	7	(0)
1991–1992	Salernitana	30	(3)
1992–1993	Bologna	21	(1)
1993–1994	Nola	30	(6)
1994–1995	Siracusa	24	(0)
1995–1996	Sora	33	(8)
1996–1999	Lecce	103	(18)
1999–2001	Sampdoria	49	(5)
2001–2002	Reggina	34	(1)
2002–2003	Cosenza	14	(3)
2003–2004	Taranto	8	(1)
Total		386	(49)
- * Club domestic league appearances and goals as of 8 November 2024

Stefano Casale (born 13 February 1971), is an Italian former professional footballer who played as a midfielder.

== Career ==
Casale began his career playing for Foggia, the team with which he was Serie B champion in 1990–91. He also had a notable spell at Lecce where he played in Serie A in the 1997–98 season.

== Honours ==
Foggia

- Serie B: 1990–91
