= Gaetano Vasari =

Italian footballer

Personal information
- Date of birth: 9 January 1970 (age 55)
- Place of birth: Palermo, Italy
- Height: 1.69 m (5 ft 7 in)
- Position(s): Right winger

Senior career*
| Years | Team | Apps | (Gls) |
| 1990–1993 | Partinicaudace | 55 | (18) |
| 1993–1994 | Trapani | 33 | (11) |
| 1994–1995 | Acireale | 36 | (4) |
| 1995–1997 | Palermo | 69 | (17) |
| 1997–1999 | Cagliari | 69 | (3) |
| 1999–2002 | Sampdoria | 76 | (13) |
| 2001 | → Lecce (loan) | 12 | (2) |
| 2002–2003 | Cesena | 11 | (1) |
| 2003–2004 | Palermo | 25 | (1) |
| 2004–2005 | Vittoria | 32 | (1) |
| 2006 | Trapani | 3 | (3) |
- *Club domestic league appearances and goals

Gaetano "Tanino" Vasari (born 9 January 1970) is an Italian former football midfielder.

== Career ==
Vasari, a native of the Palermo neighbourhood of Borgo Vecchio, started his playing career with Partinicaudace, a team from Partinico playing in the Serie D. He then signed for Serie C1 club Trapani in 1993, showing himself as one of the mainstays of the team which narrowly missed a historical promotion to Serie B. However Vasari had the opportunity to play in the national second-highest division next year, as he was signed by Acireale. From 1995 to 1997 he then played in his native city for Palermo. In 1997, he signed for Cagliari, where he also made his Serie A debut. The experience in Cagliari was followed by three seasons with Sampdoria, staggered by a five-month stay at Lecce. In 2002, he moved to play for Serie C1 club Cesena. In 2003, despite not a brilliant season in a lower division, Vasari proposed himself to Palermo, citing a promise made to his father's deathbed to bring Palermo back to Serie A; the club then accepted to sign him, with a salary proportional with the caps he would have gained with the first team. Despite not playing often, mainly only as a substitute, Vasari offered his experience to help Palermo to win the league and gain a spot in the Serie A for the first time in 31 years, and also scored the final goal in Palermo's successful Serie B campaign, in the final minutes of a home game against Bari. He then played for newly promoted Sicilian Serie C1 side Vittoria, and retired after a two-month stay at Trapani, after having been signed in March 2006 in a desperate and unsuccessful attempt to save the team from relegation to Eccellenza.

Following his retirement from football, Tanino Vasari became owner of a bakery of which he is also a cashier, located nearby the Stadio Renzo Barbera.
