= Stefano Farina =

Italian football referee (1962–2017)

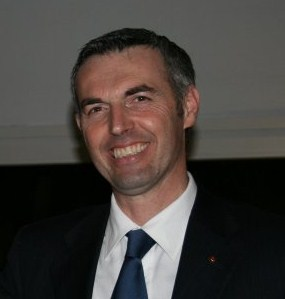
Farina in 2011

Stefano Farina (19 September 1962 – 23 May 2017) was an Italian association football referee.

== Career ==
Farina was born in Ovada on 19 September 1962. He started refereeing at the age of 16, and hade his debut in the Italian Serie A in 1995. In a 27-year career, he refereed several high-profile matches in Serie A, the UEFA Champions League, and other UEFA club competitions, including the first leg of the 2005–06 UEFA Champions League round of 16 tie between Real Madrid and Arsenal, the second leg of the 2005–06 UEFA Cup quarter-finals between Sevilla and Zenit Saint Petersburg, and the 2006 UEFA Super Cup final in Monaco between Barcelona and Sevilla, During this time, he also had an appearance in the movie Goal II as the referee of the fictional Champions League final between Real Madrid and Arsenal. He also officiated the 2000 (Lazio–Inter) and 2002 (Juventus–Parma) editions of the Supercoppa Italiana.

At international level, Farina officiated UEFA's preliminary FIFA World Cup matches in the 2002 FIFA World Cup qualification, the 2006 FIFA World Cup qualification, and also in qualifiers for the European Championship, such as the UEFA Euro 2004 qualification, as well as the UEFA Euro 2008 qualification. He is known to have served as a FIFA referee during the period from 2001 to 2007.

== Post-retirement career ==
Farina retired internationally in 2007 after reaching the mandatory retirement age of 45, and retired from refereeing domestic matches in 2009, having officiated 236 Serie A games in total. During the 2010–11 season, he served as an UEFA referee observer. He later served as the head of Italy’s Serie B referees' committee (CAN B) from 2014 until 2017. He was posthumously inducted into the Italian Football Hall of Fame in 2017.

== Death ==
Farina died in Genova on 23 May 2017, aged 54.

== Major matches refereed ==
Date	Match	Tournament	Venue	Result	Ref
25 August 2006	Barcelona vs. Sevilla	2006 UEFA Super Cup final	Stade Louis II, Monaco	0–3	

== Honours ==
- Italian Football Hall of Fame: 2017
