= Alessandro Doga =

Italian footballer (born 1975)

Personal information
- Date of birth: 15 October 1975 (age 51)
- Place of birth: Genoa, Italy
- Height: 1.80 m (5 ft 11 in)
- Position: Midfielder

Youth career
- Sampdoria

Senior career*
Years	Team	Apps	(Gls)
1995–1998	Sampdoria	0	(0)
1995–1997	→ Prato (loan)	56	(0)
1997–1998	→ Andria (loan)	32	(0)
1998–2000	Lecce	22	(0)
1999–2000	→ Chievo (loan)	18	(0)
2000–2005	Livorno	139	(5)
2005–2008	Mantova	66	(5)
2008–2009	Arezzo	13	(0)
2010–2011	Carrarese	15	(0)
- * Club domestic league appearances and goals

Alessandro Doga (born 15 October 1975) is an Italian former footballer. Doga has played 8 seasons in Serie B and 1 season in Serie A.

== Biography ==
A youth product of hometown club Sampdoria, Doga spent his early career at Serie C1 side Prato and Andria of Serie B. In 1998, he was signed by Lecce of Serie B in co-ownership deal. After Lecce promoted to Serie A, the 1999–2000 season on loan at Chievo of Serie B. In 2000, Lecce got full registration rights and sold him to Livorno in another co-ownership deal. He won Serie C1 champion in 2002 and Livorno bought the remain registration rights from Lecce. He then helped the club gain promotion to Serie A in 2004, where he played his first Serie A match on 24 October 2004 against Bologna.

In 2005, he signed a 3-year contract with Mantova. In the last season, he played 6 starts in 12 league appearances. In September 2008, he joined Arezzo of Lega Pro Prima Divisione.

After without a club for 6 months, he joined Carrarese of Lega Pro Seconda Divisione in January 2010.

== Honours ==
- Serie C1: 2002
