= 1999–2000 Coppa Italia =

Tournament details
- Country: Italy
- Dates: 15 Aug 1999 – 18 May 2000
- Teams: 48

Final positions
- Champions: Lazio (3rd title)
- Runners-up: Internazionale

Tournament statistics
- Matches played: 142
- Goals scored: 376 (2.65 per match)
- Top goal scorer(s): Nicola Caccia; David Di Michele; Francesco Flachi; Patrick M'Boma (6 goals)

The 1999–2000 Coppa Italia was the 53rd edition of the tournament, which began on 15 August 1999 and ended on 18 May 2000. In the final, Lazio beat Internazionale 2–1 on aggregate to win their third Coppa Italia.

== Group stage ==
=== Group 1 ===
Pos	Team	Pld	W	D	L	GF	GA	GD	Pts	TER (B)	LEC (A)	LUC (C1A)	FID (C1B)
1	Ternana (B)	6	4	2	0	11	4	+7	14		2–0	3–0	2–2
2	Lecce (A)	6	4	1	1	12	5	+7	13	1–1		3–1	3–0
3	Lucchese (C1A)	6	2	0	4	7	11	−4	6	1–2	0–1		2–1
4	Fidelis Andria (C1B)	6	0	1	5	5	15	−10	1	0–1	1–4	1–3	

=== Group 2 ===
Pos	Team	Pld	W	D	L	GF	GA	GD	Pts	SAM (B)	CES (B)	PAL (C1B)	SAV(B)
1	Sampdoria (B)	6	5	0	1	13	5	+8	15		1–2	4–1	1–0
2	Cesena (B)	6	3	2	1	8	6	+2	11	0–1		1–1	1–0
3	Palermo (C1B)	6	1	2	3	10	14	−4	5	1–3	2–3		3–1
4	Savoia(B)	6	0	2	4	5	11	−6	2	1–3	1–1	2–2	

=== Group 3 ===
Pos	Team	Pld	W	D	L	GF	GA	GD	Pts	GEN (B)	EMP (B)	MON(B)	LUM (C1A)
1	Genoa (B)	6	4	1	1	13	6	+7	13		5–1	1–0	2–1
2	Empoli (B)	6	3	1	2	9	8	+1	10	1–1		1–0	2–0
3	Monza(B)	6	2	1	3	8	11	−3	7	3–2	1–4		2–1
4	Lumezzane (C1A)	6	1	1	4	6	11	−5	4	0–2	2–1	2–2	

=== Group 4 ===
Pos	Team	Pld	W	D	L	GF	GA	GD	Pts	ATA (B)	CHI (B)	PIS (B)	CRE (C1A)
1	Atalanta (B)	6	4	2	0	10	1	+9	14		2–0	3–0	2–1
2	Chievo (B)	6	2	3	1	4	3	+1	9	0–0		0–0	2–0
3	Pistoiese (B)	6	1	3	2	6	9	−3	6	0–3	1–1		3–0
4	Cremonese (C1A)	6	0	2	4	3	10	−7	2	0–0	0–1	2–2	

=== Group 5 ===
Pos	Team	Pld	W	D	L	GF	GA	GD	Pts	REG (A)	TRE (B)	COS (B)	GUA (C1B)
1	Reggina (A)	6	4	2	0	8	0	+8	14		0–0	1–0	3–0
2	Treviso (B)	6	4	2	0	6	2	+4	14	0–0		2–1	2–1
3	Cosenza (B)	6	1	1	4	3	6	−3	4	0–1	0–1		1–1
4	Gualdo (C1B)	6	0	1	5	2	11	−9	1	0–3	0–1	0–1	

=== Group 6 ===
Pos	Team	Pld	W	D	L	GF	GA	GD	Pts	NAP (B)	SAL (B)	COM (C1A)	FER (B)
1	Napoli (B)	6	4	1	1	14	5	+9	13		3–0	1–1	2–0
2	Salernitana (B)	6	4	1	1	16	8	+8	13	2–0		3–0	3–0
3	Como (C1A)	6	2	2	2	11	10	+1	8	1–2	3–3		3–1
4	Fermana (B)	6	0	0	6	4	19	−15	0	1–3	2–5	0–3	

=== Group 7 ===
Pos	Team	Pld	W	D	L	GF	GA	GD	Pts	PES (B)	BRE (B)	REG(C1A)	STA (C1B)
1	Pescara (B)	6	4	0	2	18	9	+9	12		4–2	7–2	5–2
2	Brescia (B)	6	3	1	2	8	8	0	10	2–1		2–1	1–0
3	Reggiana(C1A)	6	2	2	2	8	11	−3	8	1–0	1–1		0–0
4	Juve Stabia (C1B)	6	1	1	4	4	10	−6	4	0–1	1–0	1–3	

=== Group 8 ===
Pos	Team	Pld	W	D	L	GF	GA	GD	Pts	RAV (B)	VIC (B)	SPA (C1A)	ALZ (B)
1	Ravenna (B)	6	4	1	1	9	5	+4	13		2–0	2–1	2–1
2	Vicenza (B)	6	2	2	2	9	8	+1	8	1–1		5–0	2–1
3	SPAL (C1A)	6	2	2	2	5	9	−4	8	2–1	1–1		0–0
4	Alzano Virescit (B)	6	1	1	4	5	6	−1	4	0–1	3–0	0–1	

== Second round ==
Bologna, Cagliari, Bari, Venezia, Hellas Verona, Piacenza, Perugia and Torino are added.

Team 1	Agg.	Team 2	1st leg	2nd leg
Sampdoria (B)	0–4	Bologna (A)	0–2	0–2
Cagliari (A)	7–2	Genoa (B)	3–1	4–1
Napoli (B)	2–1	Bari (A)	1–0	1–1
Pescara(B)	0–1	Venezia(A)	0–0	0–1
Ravenna (B)	4–2	Hellas Verona(A)	2–1	2–1
Reggina (A)	0–2	Piacenza (A)	0–0	0–2
Ternana (B)	2–3	Perugia (A)	1–2	1–1
Atalanta (B)	4–3	Torino(A)	3–1	1–2

== Third round ==
Internazionale, Parma, Juventus, Fiorentina, Lazio, Roma, Udinese and Milan are added.

Team 1	Agg.	Team 2	1st leg	2nd leg
Internazionale(A)	5–2	Bologna(A)	2–1	3–1
Cagliari(A)	3–2	Parma(A)	1–0	2–2
Napoli(B)	1–4	Juventus(A)	1–3	0–1
Perugia(A)	1–2	Fiorentina(A)	1–0	0–2
Ravenna (B)	2–5	Lazio(A)	1–1	1–4
Roma (A)	1–1 (3–0 p)	Piacenza (A)	0–1	1–0
Venezia (A)	3–2	Udinese(A)	3–0	0–2
Atalanta (B)	3–5	Milan(A)	3–2	0–3

== Quarter-finals ==
Team 1	Agg.	Team 2	1st leg	2nd leg
Milan (A)	3–4	Internazionale (A)	2–3	1–1
Roma(A)	0–2	Cagliari(A)	0–1	0–1
Juventus(A)	4–4 (a)	Lazio(A)	3–2	1–2
Venezia(A)	(a) 1–1	Fiorentina(A)	0–0	1–1

== Semi-finals ==
Team 1	Agg.	Team 2	1st leg	2nd leg
Cagliari(A)	3–4	Internazionale(A)	1–3	2–1
Lazio(A)	7–2	Venezia(A)	5–0	2–2

== Final ==
=== First leg ===
12 April 2000
21:00

Lazio	2–1	Internazionale
Nedvěd 39'; Simeone 51'		Seedorf 7'

Stadio Olimpico, Rome
Attendance: 35,000
Referee: Alfredo Trentalange

=== Second leg ===
18 May 2000
21:00

Internazionale	0–0	Lazio

San Siro, Milan
Attendance: 53,406
Referee: Gianluca Paparesta

Lazio won 2–1 on aggregate.

== Top goalscorers ==
Rank	Player	Club	Goals
1	(Italy) Nicola Caccia	Atalanta	6
1	(Italy) David Di Michele	Salernitana	6
1	(Italy) Francesco Flachi	Sampdoria	6
1	(Cameroon) Patrick M'Boma	Cagliari	6
5	(Italy) Christian Vieri	Internazionale	5
5	(Italy) Giacomo Lorenzini	Palermo	5
