= Emanuele Pesaresi =

Italian footballer (born 1976)

Personal information
- Date of birth: 10 December 1976 (age 49)
- Place of birth: Ancona, Italy
- Height: 1.80 m (5 ft 11 in)
- Position: Defender

Youth career
- 1993–1994: Ancona

Senior career*
Years	Team	Apps	(Gls)
1994–1995	Ancona	15	(0)
1995–2000	Sampdoria	73	(2)
1998–1999	→ Napoli (loan)	21	(3)
2000–2002	Lazio	2	(0)
2001–2002	→ Benfica (loan)	11	(0)
2002–2007	Chievo	8	(0)
2003–2004	→ Ternana (loan)	22	(0)
2005	→ Torino (loan)	11	(0)
2005–2006	→ Pescara (loan)	36	(0)
2006–2007	→ Triestina (loan)	38	(3)
2007–2008	Triestina	27	(0)
2008–2009	Cremonese	31	(4)
2009–2010	Piano San Lazzaro	16	(1)
2010–2012	Ancona 1905	56	(7)
Total		367	(20)

International career
1994–1995	Italy U-18	8	(0)
1995–1997	Italy U-21 / Olympics	9	(0)
- * Club domestic league appearances and goals

Emanuele Pesaresi (born 10 December 1976) is a former Italian footballer who last played Ancona 1905 in Serie D. He was a fast and aggressive defender who was known for his quick pace and counterattacking ability.

== Club career ==
Pesaresi started his career at hometown club Ancona of Serie B.

=== Sampdoria ===
In 1995, he signed for Sampdoria of Serie A. After no appearance in 1998–99 season, he left for Napoli of Serie B on loan. In 1999–2000 season, he returned to Sampdoria, but at Serie B.

=== Lazio ===
In 2000, he signed for Lazio of Serie A. He just played twice in Serie A 2000–01. In the next season he left for S.L. Benfica on loan.

=== Chievo ===
In 2002, he signed for Chievo of Serie A, as part of Christian Manfredini's deal. He played 7 league appearances in 2002–03 season. He then left for Ternana of Serie B on loan, where he played 22 matches.

=== Serie B ===
After played once in 2004–05 season, he left again to Torino of Serie B in January 2005. He then stayed in Serie B for Pescara and Triestina. In 2007–08 season, he signed a new contract with Triestina. He played 24 start in 27 appearances.

=== Late career ===
In 2008–09 season, he played for Cremonese at Lega Pro Prima Divisione.

After being out of contract for almost a year, he agreed to join amateurs Piano San Lazzaro of Eccellenza Marche for the final part of the 2009–10 season.

Also for the 2010–11 season, he played as captain, with the same team, which in summer 2010 it has become Ancona 1905, after the radiation of A.C. Ancona.

== International career ==
Pesaresi won a gold medal at the 1997 Mediterranean Games with the Italy U-21 team.
