= 2008–09 Parma FC season =

Parma
2008–09 season
- Chairman: Guido Angiolini
- Manager: Luigi Cagni (until 30 September 2008); Francesco Guidolin (from 30 September 2008)
- Serie B: 2nd (promoted)
- Coppa Italia: Third round
- Top goalscorer: League: Cristiano Lucarelli & Alberto Paloschi (12); All: Cristiano Lucarelli & Alberto Paloschi (12)
Home colours	Away colours

The 2008–09 Parma F.C. season was Parma's campaign in Serie B, the second tier of Italian football. The club finished 2nd in the league and were promoted to Serie A. Luigi Cagni served as manager until 30 September 2008, when he was replaced by Francesco Guidolin. The season's top scorers were Cristiano Lucarelli and Alberto Paloschi, who each scored 12 goals across all competitions.

== Squad ==
Note: Flags indicate national team as defined under FIFA eligibility rules; some limited exceptions apply. Players may hold more than one non-FIFA nationality.

No.	Pos.	Nation	Player
—	GK	ITA	Nicola Pavarini
—	GK	ITA	Paolo Ginestra
—	GK	ITA	Gianluca Pegolo
—	DF	ITA	Damiano Zenoni
—	DF	ITA	Marco Rossi
—	DF	ITA	Massimo Paci
—	DF	ITA	Luca Antonelli
—	DF	ITA	Paolo Castellini
—	DF	ITA	Giulio Falcone
—	DF	DEN	Magnus Troest
—	DF	ITA	Alessandro Lucarelli
—	DF	ITA	Francesco Pambianchi
—	MF	ITA	Francesco Parravicini
—	MF	ITA	Stefano Morrone

No.	Pos.	Nation	Player
—	MF	ITA	Andrea Pisanu
—	MF	KEN	McDonald Mariga
—	MF	ITA	Antonino D'Agostino
—	MF	ITA	Alessandro Budel
—	MF	HON	Julio César de León
—	MF	ITA	Davide Matteini
—	MF	ITA	Francesco Lunardini
—	FW	ITA	Cristiano Lucarelli
—	FW	BRA	Reginaldo
—	FW	ITA	Daniele Paponi
—	FW	BLR	Vitaly Kutuzov
—	FW	ITA	Alessio Manzoni
—	FW	ITA	Daniele Vantaggiato
—	FW	ITA	Alberto Paloschi

== Competitions ==
=== Serie B ===
==== Results ====
29 August 2008 1	Parma	1–1	Rimini	Stadio Ennio Tardini, Parma
	C. Lucarelli 31' (pen.)	Summary	Basha 42'

16 September 2008 2	Albinoleffe	1–0	Parma	Stadio Atleti Azzurri d'Italia, Bergamo
	Ruopolo 63'	Summary	De León (yellow card) 13' (yellow-red card) 78'

13 September 2008 3	Parma	4–1	Ancona	Stadio Ennio Tardini, Parma
	Paloschi 11'; C. Lucarelli 18', 50' (pen.); Matteini 82'	Summary	Mastronunzio 14'

20 September 2008 4	Grosseto	1–0	Parma	Stadio Olimpico Carlo Zecchini
	Lazzari 16'	Summary

23 September 2008 5	Parma	2–2	Frosinone	Stadio Ennio Tardini, Parma
	Paloschi 17'; C. Lucarelli 50'	Summary	Santoruvo 12'; Dedić 56' (pen.)

29 September 2008 6	Brescia	0–0	Parma	Stadio Mario Rigamonti, Brescia
		Summary

4 October 2008 7	Parma	0–0	Modena	Stadio Ennio Tardini, Parma
		Summary

12 October 2008 8	Treviso	2–2	Parma	Stadio Omobono Tenni, Treviso
	D'Aversa 2'; Bonucci 32'; Dal Canto (red card) 90'	Summary	C. Lucarelli 17' (pen.), 64' (pen.)

18 October 2008 9	Parma	1–0	Empoli	Stadio Ennio Tardini, Parma
	Paponi 81'	Summary

25 October 2008 10	Mantova	1–3	Parma	Stadio Danilo Martelli, Mantua
	Caridi 10'	Summary	Zenoni 49'; C. Lucarelli 59' (pen.); Reginaldo 61'

28 October 2008 11	Parma	2–1	Triestina	Stadio Ennio Tardini, Parma
	Morrone 14'; Castellini 81'	Summary	C. Lucarelli 69' (o.g.)

1 November 2008 12	Piacenza	1–1	Parma	Stadio Leonardo Garilli, Piacenza
	Rickler 70'	Summary	Pisanu 88'

10 November 2008 13	Parma	1–1	Bari	Stadio Ennio Tardini, Parma
	Pisanu 9'	Summary	Barreto 34' (pen.)

15 November 2008 14	Ascoli	0–1	Parma	Stadio Cino e Lillo Del Duca, Ascoli Piceno
		Summary	Paponi 76'

22 November 2008 15	Parma	0–0	Livorno	Stadio Ennio Tardini, Parma
		Summary

28 November 2008 16	Salernitana	1–2	Parma	Stadio Arechi, Salerno
	Di Napoli 37'	Summary	C. Lucarelli 36'; De León 70'

6 December 2008 17	Parma	1–0	Avellino	Stadio Ennio Tardini, Parma
	Troest 8'	Summary

13 December 2008 18	Pisa	2–1	Parma	Arena Garibaldi, Pisa
	Braiati 57'; Inácio 60'	Summary	C. Lucarelli 30' (pen.)

19 December 2008 19	Parma	1–0	Cittadella	Stadio Ennio Tardini, Parma
	Falcone (red card) 37'; Paloschi 74'	Summary

10 January 2009 20	Vicenza	1–1	Parma	Stadio Romeo Menti, Vicenza
	Sgrigna 76'	Summary	Reginaldo 68'

17 January 2009 21	Parma	1–1	Sassuolo	Stadio Ennio Tardini, Parma
	C. Lucarelli 61'	Summary	Erpen 90+2' (pen.)

24 January 2009 22	Rimini	0–0	Parma	Stadio Romeo Neri, Rimini
		Summary

31 January 2009 23	Parma	3–1	AlbinoLeffe	Stadio Ennio Tardini, Parma
	Paloschi 17'; Budel 60'; A. Lucarelli 76'	Summary	Madonna 27'; Luoni (yellow card) 67' (yellow-red card) 89'; Ruopolo (red card) 90'

6 February 2009 24	Ancona	2–0	Parma	Stadio del Conero, Ancona
	Mastronunzio 39', 56'	Summary

14 February 2009 25	Parma	4–0	Grosseto	Stadio Ennio Tardini, Parma
	Vantaggiato 4', 84'; De León 40', 52'	Summary

17 February 2009 26	Frosinone	1–2	Parma	Stadio Matusa, Frosinone
	Cavalli 13'	Summary	Manzoni 71'; Éder 90' (o.g.)

22 February 2009 27	Parma	1–0	Brescia	Stadio Ennio Tardini, Parma
	Paloschi 38'	Summary

28 February 2009 28	Modena	2–2	Parma	Stadio Alberto Braglia, Modena
	Bruno 6'; Pinardi 42'	Summary	Mariga 34'; C. Lucarelli 44' (pen.)

7 March 2009 29	Parma	0–0	Treviso	Stadio Ennio Tardini, Parma
		Summary

13 March 2009 30	Empoli	1–4	Parma	Stadio Carlo Castellani, Empoli
	Pozzi 18'	Summary	Paci 34'; Paloschi 41', 45'; Mariga 59'

17 March 2009 31	Parma	1–0	Mantova	Stadio Ennio Tardini, Parma
	De León 82'	Summary	Rizzi (red card) 84'; D'Aversa (yellow card) 84' (yellow-red card) 87'

21 March 2009 32	Triestina	0–3	Parma	Stadio Nereo Rocco, Trieste
		Summary	Budel 2'; Vantaggiato 69'; Mariga 90'

29 March 2009 33	Parma	1–1	Piacenza	Stadio Ennio Tardini, Parma
	Budel 26'	Summary	Graffiedi 61'

4 April 2009 34	Bari	0–2	Parma	Stadio San Nicola, Bari
		Summary	Vantaggiato 15'; Paloschi 27'

18 April 2009 36	Livorno	2–2	Parma	Stadio Armando Picchi, Livorno
	Tavano 24' (pen.); Danilevičius 72'	Summary	A. Lucarelli 66'; Paloschi 86'

21 April 2009 35	Parma	2–0	Ascoli	Stadio Ennio Tardini, Parma
	Morrone 21'; Paloschi 75'	Summary

27 April 2009 37	Parma	0–0	Salernitana	Stadio Ennio Tardini, Parma
		Summary

2 May 2009 38	Avellino	3–3	Parma	Stadio Partenio, Avellino
	Aubameyang 57'; Babú 80'; Ciotola 84'	Summary	Troest 50'; Reginaldo 59'; Morrone 73'

9 May 2009 39	Parma	2–0	Pisa	Stadio Ennio Tardini, Parma
	C. Lucarelli 70'; De León 85'	Summary

16 May 2009 40	Cittadella	2–2	Parma	Stadio Pier Cesare Tombolato, Cittadella
	Meggiorini 50', 86'	Summary	Pesoli 4' (o.g.); Reginaldo 31'

23 May 2009 41	Parma	4–0	Vicenza	Stadio Ennio Tardini, Parma
	Paloschi 12', 48'; Lunardini 26'; Bjelanović 42' (o.g.)	Summary

30 May 2009 42	Sassuolo	2–2	Parma	Stadio Alberto Braglia, Modena
	Noselli 23'; Martinetti 28'	Summary	De León 31' (pen.); Reginaldo 90'

==== Table ====
Pos	Team	Pld	W	D	L	GF	GA	GD	Pts	Promotion or relegation
1	Bari (C, P)	42	22	14	6	65	35	+30	80	Promotion to Serie A
2	Parma (P)	42	19	19	4	65	34	+31	76	Promotion to Serie A
3	Livorno (O, P)	42	16	20	6	64	40	+24	68	Qualification to promotion play-offs
4	Brescia	42	18	13	11	54	40	+14	67 (Note: BRE 2–0 EMP; EMP 2–2 BRE)	Qualification to promotion play-offs
5	Empoli	42	18	13	11	53	44	+9	67	Qualification to promotion play-offs

Source: http://www.corrieredellosport.it/live/SerieB/classifica.shtml
Rules for classification: 1) points; 2) goal difference; 3) number of goals scored.
(C) Champions; (O) Play-off winners; (P) Promoted

=== Coppa Italia ===
16 August 2008 Second Round	Parma	3–2 (a.e.t.)	Portogruaro	Stadio Ennio Tardini, Parma
20:30	Paci 72'; Morrone 90'; Paponi 91'	[Report]	Cunico 35'; Maniero 65'

23 August 2008 Third Round	Catania	2–1 (a.e.t.)	Parma	Stadio Angelo Massimino, Catania
20:30	Paolucci 105', 108'	[Report]	Troest 110'

== Squad statistics ==
=== Appearances and goals ===
As of 24 July 2012

No.	Pos	Nat	Player	Total		Serie B		Coppa Italia	
No.	Pos	Nat	Player	Apps	Goals	Apps	Goals	Apps	Goals
	GK	(Italy) ITA	Paolo Ginestra	1	0	0+1	0	0+0	0
	GK	(Italy) ITA	Nicola Pavarini	38	0	38+0	0	0+0	0
	GK	(Italy) ITA	Gianluca Pegolo	5	0	4+1	0	0+0	0
	DF	(Italy) ITA	Luca Antonelli	13	0	6+7	0	0+0	0
	DF	(Italy) ITA	Paolo Castellini	41	1	41+0	1	0+0	0
	DF	(Italy) ITA	Giulio Falcone	11	0	10+1	0	0+0	0
	DF	(Italy) ITA	Alessandro Lucarelli	38	2	37+1	2	0+0	0
	DF	(Italy) ITA	Massimo Paci	31	2	30+1	1	0+0	1
	DF	(Italy) ITA	Francesco Pambianchi	1	0	0+1	0	0+0	0
	DF	(Italy) ITA	Marco Rossi	20	0	15+5	0	0+0	0
	DF	(Denmark) DEN	Magnus Troest	29	3	24+5	2	0+0	1
	DF	(Italy) ITA	Damiano Zenoni	37	1	33+4	1	0+0	0
	MF	(Italy) ITA	Antonino D'Agostino	3	0	0+3	0	0+0	0
	MF	(Italy) ITA	Alessandro Budel	35	3	33+2	3	0+0	0
	MF	(Honduras) HON	Julio César de León	32	6	23+9	6	0+0	0
	MF	(Italy) ITA	Francesco Lunardini	19	1	13+6	1	0+0	0
	MF	(Kenya) KEN	McDonald Mariga	34	3	22+12	3	0+0	0
	MF	(Italy) ITA	Davide Matteini	2	2	0+2	1	0+0	1
	MF	(Italy) ITA	Stefano Morrone	35	4	35+0	3	0+0	1
	MF	(Italy) ITA	Francesco Parravicini	1	0	1+0	0	0+0	0
	MF	(Italy) ITA	Andrea Pisanu	11	2	6+5	2	0+0	0
	FW	(Belarus) BLR	Vitaly Kutuzov	11	0	4+7	0	0+0	0
	FW	(Italy) ITA	Cristiano Lucarelli	29	12	23+6	12	0+0	0
	FW	(Italy) ITA	Alessio Manzoni	3	1	1+2	1	0+0	0
	FW	(Italy) ITA	Alberto Paloschi	39	12	27+12	12	0+0	0
	FW	(Italy) ITA	Daniele Paponi	7	3	2+5	2	0+0	1
	FW	(Brazil) BRA	Reginaldo	25	5	19+6	5	0+0	0
	FW	(Italy) ITA	Daniele Vantaggiato	16	3	15+1	3	0+0	0
Players who appeared for Parma that left during the season:

=== Top scorers ===
Place	Position	Nation	Number	Name	Serie B	Coppa Italia	Total
1	FW	(Italy)		Cristiano Lucarelli	12	0	12
1	FW	(Italy)		Alberto Paloschi	12	0	12
3	MF	(Honduras)		Julio César de León	6	0	6
4	FW	(Brazil)		Reginaldo	5	0	5
5	FW	(Italy)		Daniele Vantaggiato	4	0	4
5	MF	(Italy)		Stefano Morrone	3	1	4
7	DF	(Kenya)		McDonald Mariga	3	0	3
7				Own goal	3	0	3
7	MF	(Italy)		Alessandro Budel	3	0	3
7	FW	(Italy)		Daniele Paponi	2	1	3
7	DF	(Denmark)		Magnus Troest	2	1	3
12	DF	(Italy)		Alessandro Lucarelli	2	0	2
12	MF	(Italy)		Andrea Pisanu	2	0	2
12	DF	(Italy)		Massimo Paci	1	1	2
12	FW	(Italy)		Davide Matteini	1	1	2
15	DF	(Italy)		Damiano Zenoni	1	0	1
15	DF	(Italy)		Paolo Castellini	1	0	1
15	MF	(Italy)		Alessio Manzoni	1	0	1
15	MF	(Italy)		Francesco Lunardini	1	0	1
				TOTALS	65	4	69

=== Disciplinary record ===
Number	Nation	Position	Name	Serie B		Coppa Italia		Total	
Number	Nation	Position	Name	Yellow card	Red card	Yellow card	Red card	Yellow card	Red card
	(Italy)	GK	Nicola Pavarini	1	0	0	0	1	0
	(Italy)	DF	Paolo Castellini	6	0	0	0	6	0
	(Italy)	DF	Massimo Paci	11	0	0	0	11	0
	(Italy)	DF	Alessandro Lucarelli	13	2	0	0	13	2
	(Denmark)	DF	Magnus Troest	4	0	0	0	4	0
	(Italy)	DF	Damiano Zenoni	8	0	0	0	8	0
	(Italy)	DF	Luca Antonelli	1	0	0	0	1	0
	(Italy)	DF	Giulio Falcone	2	1	0	0	2	1
	(Italy)	DF	Marco Rossi	3	0	0	0	3	0
	(Italy)	MF	Stefano Morrone	8	0	0	0	8	0
	(Italy)	MF	Alessandro Budel	6	0	0	0	6	0
	(Honduras)	MF	Julio César de León	10	1	0	0	10	1
	(Kenya)	MF	McDonald Mariga	7	0	0	0	7	0
	(Italy)	MF	Francesco Parravicini	1	0	0	0	1	0
	(Italy)	MF	Francesco Lunardini	4	0	0	0	4	0
	(Brazil)	FW	Reginaldo	3	0	0	0	3	0
	(Italy)	FW	Cristiano Lucarelli	5	0	0	0	5	0
	(Italy)	FW	Alberto Paloschi	4	0	0	0	4	0
	(Italy)	FW	Daniele Paponi	2	0	0	0	2	0
	(Italy)	FW	Daniele Vantaggiato	3	0	0	0	3	0
			TOTALS	102	4	0	0	102	4

== Sources ==
- RSSSF - Italy 2008/09
