= 2009–10 Parma FC season =

Parma
2009–10 season
- President: Tommaso Ghirardi
- Manager: Francesco Guidolin
- Stadium: Stadio Ennio Tardini
- Serie A: 8th
- Coppa Italia: Third round
- Top goalscorer: League: Valeri Bojinov (8); All: Valeri Bojinov (8)
- Highest home attendance: 11,745 vs Catania; 30 August 2009
- Lowest home attendance: 21,323 vs Roma; 1 May 2010
- Average home league attendance: 17,073
Home colours	Away colours	Third colours

The 2009–10 season was Parma Football Club's 19th season in Serie A, having spent a year in Serie B, where they finished second the previous year. Parma enjoyed a successful league season, securing eighth position and narrowly missing out on a return to European competition for the first time since 2006–07.

== Competitions ==
=== Serie A ===
==== League table ====
Pos	Team	Pld	W	D	L	GF	GA	GD	Pts	Qualification or relegation
6	Napoli	38	15	14	9	50	43	+7	59	Qualification to Europa League play-off round
7	Juventus	38	16	7	15	55	56	−1	55	Qualification to Europa League third qualifying round
8	Parma	38	14	10	14	46	51	−5	52	
9	Genoa	38	14	9	15	57	61	−4	51	
10	Bari	38	13	11	14	49	49	0	50	

Source: Lega Calcio and Yahoo! Sport
Rules for classification: 1) points; 2) head-to-head points; 3) head-to-head goal difference; 4) head-to-head goals scored; 5) goal difference; 6) number of goals scored.

==== Matches ====
23 August 2009 1	Udinese	2–2	Parma	Stadio Friuli, Udine
20:45 CEST	Di Natale 44' (pen.), 89'	Report	Paloschi 42'; A. Lucarelli 49'	Attendance: 15,383; Referee: Paolo Valeri

30 August 2009 2	Parma	2–1	Catania	Stadio Ennio Tardini, Parma
20:45 CEST	Galloppa 13'; Paloschi 47'	Report	Biagianti 15'	Attendance: 11,745; Referee: Paolo Mazzoleni

13 September 2009 3	Inter	2–0	Parma	San Siro, Milan
15:00 CEST	Eto'o 71'; Milito 88'	Report		Attendance: 51,237; Referee: Roberto Rosetti

20 September 2009 4	Parma	1–0	Palermo	Stadio Ennio Tardini, Parma
15:00 CEST	Zaccardo 17'	Report		Attendance: 14,815; Referee: Antonio Giannoccaro

23 September 2009 5	Lazio	1–2	Parma	Stadio Olimpico, Rome
20:45 CEST	Zárate 42' (pen.); Kolarov (yellow card) 44' (yellow-red card) 44'	Report	Bojinov 21'; Amoruso 44' (pen.)	Attendance: 30,000; Referee: Massimiliano Velotto

27 September 2009 6	Parma	0–2	Cagliari	Stadio Ennio Tardini, Parma
20:45 CEST		Report	Jeda 8'; Dessena 58'	Attendance: 15,078; Referee: Dino Tommasi

4 October 2009 7	Sampdoria	1–1	Parma	Stadio Luigi Ferraris, Genoa
15:00 CEST	Pazzini 23'	Report	Galloppa 30'	Attendance: 25,786; Referee: Paolo Mazzoleni

18 October 2009 8	Parma	1–0	Siena	Stadio Ennio Tardini, Parma
15:00 CEST	Bojinov 6'	Report	Fini (red card) 34'	Attendance: 15,126; Referee: Christian Brighi

25 October 2009 9	Atalanta	3–1	Parma	Stadio Atleti Azzurri d'Italia, Bergamo
15:00 CET	Valdés 43' (pen.); Tiribocchi 52'; Peluso 84'	Report	Paloschi 77'	Attendance: 10,000; Referee: Andrea Romeo

28 October 2009 10	Parma	2–0	Bari	Stadio Ennio Tardini, Parma
20:45 CET	Bojinov 58'; Paloschi 66'	Report		Attendance: 15,952; Referee: Leonardo Baracani

31 October 2009 11	Milan	2–0	Parma	San Siro, Milan
20:45 CET	Borriello 12', 90'	Report		Attendance: 33,303; Referee: Carmine Russo

8 November 2009 12	Parma	2–0	Chievo	Stadio Ennio Tardini, Parma
20:45 CET	Zaccardo 41'; Lanzafame 72'	Report		Attendance: 14,793; Referee: Riccardo Pinzani

21 November 2009 13	Fiorentina	2–3	Parma	Stadio Artemio Franchi, Florence
20:45 CET	Gilardino 26', 62'; Donadel (yellow card) 82' (yellow-red card) 86'	Report	Amoruso 30'; Bojinov 52'; Lanzafame 68'	Attendance: 25,068; Referee: Daniele Orsato

29 November 209 14	Parma	1–1	Napoli	Stadio Ennio Tardini, Parma
15:00 CET	Amoruso 86' (pen.)	Report	Denis 33'; Contini (red card) 84'	Attendance: 19,737; Referee: Matteo Trefoloni

6 December 2009 15	Genoa	2–2	Parma	Stadio Luigi Ferraris, Genoa
15:00 CET	Palacio 13'; Palladino 66'	Report	Biabiany 36', 58'	Attendance: 25,869; Referee: Christian Brighi

13 December 2009 16	Parma	2–1	Bologna	Stadio Ennio Tardini, Parma
15:00 CET	Panucci 57'; Amoruso 86'	Report	Mudingayi 43'; Britos (red card) 71'	Attendance: 17,535; Referee: Sebastiano Peruzzo

20 December 2009 17	Roma	2–0	Parma	Stadio Olimpico, Rome
15:00 CET	Burdisso 47'; Brighi 90'	Report	Paci (yellow card) 71' (yellow-red card) 87'	Attendance: 36,899; Referee: Paolo Tagliavento

6 January 2010 18	Parma	1–2	Juventus	Stadio Ennio Tardini, Parma
15:00 CET	Amoruso 25'	Report	Salihamidžić 3'; Castellini 39' (o.g.); Cáceres (yellow card) 32' (yellow-red card) 73'	Attendance: 20,530; Referee: Nicola Rizzoli

10 January 2010 19	Livorno	2–1	Parma	Stadio Armando Picchi, Livorno
15:00 CET	Tavano 23'; Lucarelli 62'	Report	Džemaili 68'	Attendance: 8,000; Referee: Andrea De Marco

17 January 2010 20	Parma	0–0	Udinese	Stadio Ennio Tardini, Parma
20:45 CET	Galloppa (red card) 31'	Report		Attendance: 14,839; Referee: Leonardo Baracani

23 January 2010 21	Catania	3–0	Parma	Stadio Angelo Massimino, Catania
18:00 CET	Mascara 15'; Martínez 71'; Morimoto 77'	Report		Attendance: 12,733; Referee: Andrea Gervasoni

6 February 2010 22	Palermo	2–1	Parma	Stadio Renzo Barbera, Palermo
18:00 CET	Cavani 62'; Simplício 87'	Report	Biabiany 72'	Attendance: 25,000; Referee: Nicola Pierpaoli

10 February 2010^{1} 23	Parma	1–1	Inter	Stadio Ennio Tardini, Parma
20:45 CET	Bojinov 54'; Valiani (yellow card) 64' (yellow-red card) 72'	Report	Balotelli 59'	Attendance: 20,128; Referee: Mauro Bergonzi

14 February 2010 24	Parma	0–2	Lazio	Stadio Ennio Tardini, Parma
15:00 CET	Jiménez (red card) 73'	Report	Stendardo 68'; Zárate 89'	Attendance: 15,313; Referee: Andre De Marco

21 February 2010 25	Cagliari	2–0	Parma	Stadio Sant'Elia, Cagliari
15:00 CET	Lazzari 6'; Matri 39'	Report		Attendance: 15,000; Referee: Carmine Russo

28 February 2010 26	Parma	1–0	Sampdoria	Stadio Ennio Tardini, Parma
15:00 CET	Zaccardo 54'; Galloppa (yellow card) 61' (yellow-red card) 90'	Report		Attendance: 18,789; Referee: Gianluca Rocchi

7 March 2010 27	Siena	1–1	Parma	Stadio Artemio Franchi, Siena
20:45 CET	Vergassola 69'	Report	Biabiany 35'; Jiménez (yellow card) 36' (yellow-red card) 79'	Attendance: 10,151; Referee: Andrea Gervasoni

14 March 2010 28	Parma	1–0	Atalanta	Stadio Ennio Tardini, Parma
15:00 CET	Bojinov 71'	Report	Doni (red card) 73'	Attendance: 15,560; Referee: Massimiliano Saccani

21 March 2010 29	Bari	1–1	Parma	Stadio San Nicola, Bari
15:00 CET	Masiello 85'	Report	Zenoni 36'	Attendance: 18,000; Referee: Marco Guida

24 March 2010 30	Parma	1–1	AC Milan	Stadio Ennio Tardini, Parma
20:45 CET	Bojinov 90'	Report	Pirlo 90'	Attendance: 20,493; Referee: Emidio Morganti

28 March 2010 31	Chievo	0–0	Parma	Stadio Marc'Antonio Bentegodi, Verona
15:00 CEST		Report		Attendance: 9,000; Referee: Daniele Doveri

3 April 2010 32	Parma	1–1	Fiorentina	Stadio Ennio Tardini, Parma
15:00 CEST	Bojinov 67'	Report	De Silvestri 22'	Attendance: 18,702; Referee: Andrea De Marco

10 April 2010 33	Napoli	2–3	Parma	Stadio San Paolo, Naples
18:00 CEST	Quagliarella 3'; Hamšík 78'; Quagliarella (yellow card) 84' (yellow-red card) 86'	Report	Antonelli 63'; Lucarelli 68'; Jiménez 87'	Attendance: 36,527; Referee: Andrea Romeo

18 April 2010 34	Parma	2–3	Genoa	Stadio Ennio Tardini, Parma
15:00 CEST	Zaccardo 59'; Bocchetti 62' (o.g.)	Report	Palacio 33', 52'; Fatić 73'	Attendance: 16,660; Referee: Luca Banti

25 April 2010 35	Bologna	2–1	Parma	Stadio Renato Dall'Ara, Bologna
15:00 CEST	Di Vaio 39', 50'	Report	Biabiany 23'; Zaccardo (red card) 29'	Attendance: 23,970; Referee: Mauro Bergonzi

1 May 2010 36	Parma	1–2	Roma	Stadio Ennio Tardini, Parma
18:00 CEST	Lanzafame 81'; Jiménez (yellow card) 6' (yellow-red card) 88'	Report	Totti 5'; Taddei 75'	Attendance: 21,323; Referee: Gianlucca Rocchi

9 May 2010 37	Juventus	2–3	Parma	Stadio Olimpico di Torino, Turin
20:45 CET	Del Piero 16'; Iaquinta 90'	Report	Lanzafame 20', 40'; Biabiany 84'	Attendance: 23,656; Referee: Andrea Romeo

16 May 2010 38	Parma	4–1	Livorno	Stadio Ennio Tardini, Parma
15:00 CEST	Lanzafame 44', 46'; Morrone 49'; Crespo 90'	Report	Danilevičius 72'	Attendance: 17,272; Referee: Emiliano Gallione

Notes

- The match was originally scheduled for 31 January 2010 but was postponed due to snow.

=== Coppa Italia ===
14 August 2009 Third round	Parma	1–2	Novara	Parma
20:00 CEST (UTC+02:00)	Lucarelli 56'		Vicentini 45+1'; Bertani 63'	Stadium: Stadio Ennio Tardini; Attendance: 2,751; Referee: Renzo Candussio

== Squad statistics ==
No.	Pos	Nat	Player	Total		Serie A		Coppa Italia	
No.	Pos	Nat	Player	Apps	Goals	Apps	Goals	Apps	Goals
1	GK	(Italy) ITA	Nicola Pavarini	2	0	1+1	0	0+0	0
3	DF	(Italy) ITA	Luca Antonelli	25	1	13+11	1	0+1	0
4	MF	(Italy) ITA	Stefano Morrone	31	1	30+1	1	0+0	0
5	DF	(Italy) ITA	Cristian Zaccardo	34	4	34+0	4	0+0	0
6	DF	(Italy) ITA	Alessandro Lucarelli	34	2	33+0	1	1+0	1
7	DF	(Italy) ITA	Paolo Castellini	29	0	20+8	0	1+0	0
8	MF	(Italy) ITA	Francesco Lunardini	18	0	7+11	0	0+0	0
9	FW	(Italy) ITA	Davide Lanzafame	28	7	14+13	7	1+0	0
10	MF	(Switzerland) SUI	Blerim Džemaili	19	1	17+2	1	0+0	0
11	MF	(Chile) CHI	Luis Jiménez	12	1	10+2	1	0+0	0
14	MF	(Italy) ITA	Daniele Galloppa	35	1	33+1	1	1+0	0
15	MF	(Italy) ITA	Paolo Dellafiore	23	0	22+1	0	0+0	0
19	DF	(Italy) ITA	Damiano Zenoni	19	1	14+4	1	1+0	0
20	FW	(France) FRA	Jonathan Biabiany	31	6	26+4	6	0+1	0
21	FW	(Italy) ITA	Alessio Manzoni	1	0	0+1	0	0+0	0
24	DF	(Italy) ITA	Massimo Paci	27	0	22+4	0	1+0	0
34	DF	(Somalia) SOM	Abel Gigli	1	0	0+1	0	0+0	0
43	FW	(Italy) ITA	Alberto Paloschi	18	5	9+8	5	1+0	0
77	FW	(Argentina) ARG	Hernán Crespo	13	1	10+3	1	0+0	0
80	MF	(Italy) ITA	Francesco Valiani	14	0	14+0	0	0+0	0
83	GK	(Italy) ITA	Antonio Mirante	38	0	37+0	0	1+0	0
86	FW	(Bulgaria) BUL	Valeri Bojinov	31	8	15+15	8	0+1	0
90	FW	(Italy) ITA	Riccardo Pasi	1	0	0+1	0	0+0	0
Players who appeared for Parma that left the club during the season:
2	DF	(Italy) ITA	Christian Panucci	20	1	19+0	1	1+0	0
17	MF	(Kenya) KEN	McDonald Mariga	10	0	8+1	0	1+0	0
23	FW	(France) FRA	Nicola Amoruso	17	5	10+7	5	0+0	0
32	MF	(Italy) ITA	Alessandro Budel	1	0	0+1	0	0+0	0
	MF	(Chile) CHI	Nicolás Córdova	1	0	0+0	0	1+0	0

=== Top scorers ===
Place	Position	Nation	Number	Name	Serie A	Coppa Italia	Total
1	FW	(Bulgaria)	86	Valeri Bojinov	8	0	8
2	FW	(Italy)	9	Davide Lanzafame	7	0	7
3	FW	(France)	20	Jonathan Biabiany	6	0	6
4	FW	(Italy)	23	Nicola Amoruso	5	0	5
4	FW	(Italy)	43	Alberto Paloschi	5	0	5
6	DF	(Italy)	5	Cristian Zaccardo	4	0	4
7	MF	(Italy)	14	Daniele Galloppa	2	0	2
7	DF	(Italy)	6	Alessandro Lucarelli	1	1	2
9	DF	(Italy)	2	Christian Panucci	1	0	1
9	DF	(Italy)	3	Luca Antonelli	1	0	1
9	MF	(Italy)	4	Stefano Morrone	1	0	1
9	MF	(Switzerland)	10	Blerim Džemaili	1	0	1
9	DF	(Italy)	19	Damiano Zenoni	1	0	1
9	DF	(Chile)	11	Luis Jiménez	1	0	1
9	FW	(Argentina)	77	Hernán Crespo	1	0	1
9				Own goal	1	0	1
				TOTALS	46	1	47

=== Disciplinary record ===
Number	Nation	Position	Name	Serie A		Coppa Italia		Total	
Number	Nation	Position	Name	Yellow card	Red card	Yellow card	Red card	Yellow card	Red card
1	(Italy)	GK	Nicola Pavarini	1	0	0	0	1	0
2	(Italy)	DF	Christian Panucci	7	0	0	0	7	0
3	(Italy)	DF	Luca Antonelli	1	0	0	0	1	0
4	(Italy)	MF	Stefano Morrone	9	0	0	0	9	0
5	(Italy)	DF	Cristian Zaccardo	6	1	0	0	6	1
6	(Italy)	DF	Alessandro Lucarelli	9	0	0	0	9	0
7	(Italy)	DF	Paolo Castellini	2	0	0	0	2	0
8	(Italy)	MF	Francesco Lunardini	3	0	0	0	3	0
9	(Italy)	FW	Davide Lanzafame	5	0	0	0	5	0
10	(Switzerland)	MF	Blerim Džemaili	5	0	0	0	5	0
11	(Chile)	MF	Luis Jiménez	4	3	0	0	4	3
14	(Italy)	MF	Daniele Galloppa	10	2	0	0	10	2
15	(Italy)	MF	Paolo Dellafiore	6	0	0	0	6	0
19	(Italy)	DF	Damiano Zenoni	2	0	0	0	2	0
20	(France)	FW	Jonathan Biabiany	5	0	0	0	5	0
23	(Italy)	FW	Nicola Amoruso	1	0	0	0	1	0
24	(Italy)	DF	Massimo Paci	7	0	0	0	7	0
43	(Italy)	FW	Alberto Paloschi	4	1	0	0	4	1
80	(Italy)	MF	Francesco Valiani	6	1	0	0	6	1
83	(Italy)	GK	Antonio Mirante	2	0	0	0	2	0
86	(Bulgaria)	FW	Valeri Bojinov	2	0	1	0	3	0
			TOTALS	97	8	1	0	98	8
