= Francesco Parravicini =

Italian footballer (born 1982)

Personal information
- Date of birth: 31 January 1982 (age 44)
- Place of birth: Milan, Italy
- Height: 1.76 m (5 ft 9 in)
- Position: Midfielder

Youth career
- Pro Sesto

Senior career*
| Years | Team | Apps | (Gls) |
| 1999–2001 | Pro Sesto | 42 | (0) |
| 2001–2006 | Treviso | 127 | (4) |
| 2006–2007 | Palermo | 8 | (0) |
| 2007 | → Parma (loan) | 16 | (1) |
| 2007–2009 | Parma | 17 | (0) |
| 2009 | → Atalanta (loan) | 8 | (0) |
| 2009–2012 | Siena | 9 | (0) |
| 2010–2011 | → Livorno (loan) | 9 | (0) |
| 2012–2015 | Novara | 14 | (1) |

Managerial career
- 2016–2017: Pro Sesto (youth)
- 2017–2021: Pro Sesto
- 2021: Renate
- 2023–2024: Pro Sesto
- * Club domestic league appearances and goals

Francesco Parravicini (born 31 January 1982) is an Italian football coach and a former player who played as a midfielder.

== Playing career ==
=== Pro Sesto ===
Parravicini started his career at Pro Sesto. During 2000–01 season Parravicini was signed by Treviso in co-ownership deal. The deal was renewed in June 2001. Parravicini became a member of Treviso first team in 2001.

=== Treviso ===
Parravicini formally joined Treviso on 1 July 2001.

He made his Serie A debut against A.S. Livorno Calcio on 11 September 2005. Treviso was promoted due to Caso Genoa, the bankruptcy of Torino Calcio and AC Perugia.

In January 2006, Parravicini was sold to Fiorentina for €2.7 million, but loaned back to Treviso for the rest of the season. Treviso also signed William Viali outright, Gianni Guigou and Christian Maggio in temporary deals.

=== Palermo ===
In May 2006, Parravicini was sold to Palermo from Fiorentina for €1.5 million as part of the deal of Mario Santana (€6.5 million). Fiorentina also retained half of the player's registration rights. He played five games in the UEFA Cup, 1 in Coppa Italia and 8 in the Serie A, before moving on loan to Parma.

=== Parma ===
On 31 January 2007, he was loaned to Parma, with Maurizio Ciaramitaro returned to Palermo. On 11 February 2007 he played his first Serie A match for Parma against AS Roma.

In June 2007, Parma bought Parravicini outright from Palermo and Fiorentina for €1.9 million. Palermo and Fiorentina share the revenue equally. The deal also made Palermo only paid Parma €4 million cash for the signing of Mark Bresciano (€2.5 million) and Fábio Simplício (€4.6 million) in 2006, as Parma acquired 50% rights of Parravicini (€950,000), Igor Budan (€1.25 million) and Davide Matteini (€900,000) from Palermo in 2007. (Before the deal, Palermo still had €4,666,000 debt to Parma on 30 June 2007) Parma also signed Reginaldo from Fiorentina in 2007 for €4.5 million, thus along with Parravicini, counter-weight the signing of Sébastien Frey from Parma in 2006 for €5.6 million.

On 2 February 2009, the Parma F.C. player will play on loan for Atalanta until the end of the season; at the same time Parma have obtained from the Lombard club the loan of Antonino D'Agostino and Alessio Manzoni.

=== Siena ===
In June 2009 he was sold to Siena for €2.5 million along with Reginaldo (50% rights for €2.5 million), which Manuel Coppola (€3 million) and Daniele Galloppa (50% rights for €5 million) joined Parma in exchange. Parravicini signed a four-year contract. On 15 July 2010, he was signed by Livorno.

=== Novara ===
On 31 August 2012, Parravicini joined Novara. Laurent Lanteri also moved to Siena as part of the deal. Thus, no cash was involved. Both players were "valued" €1 million.

== Coaching career ==
In the summer of 2017, he was hired as head coach of Serie D club Pro Sesto. His contract was extended on 14 June 2019. For the 2020–21 season, the club was promoted to Serie C. He was dismissed by Pro Sesto on 28 March 2021 as the team only won once in their preceding 12 games.

He successively served as head coach of Serie C club Renate, resigning after only one league game in charge.

On 3 July 2023, Parravicini agreed to return to Pro Sesto as the club's new head coach. He was dismissed on 23 January 2024, leaving Pro Sesto in the relegation zone.

== Career statistics ==
Club Performance
| Club | Season | Serie C2 | | Coppa Italia Serie C | | | | Others | | Total | |
| Club | Season | App | Goals | App | Goals | App | Goals | App | Goals | App | Goals |
|---|---|---|---|---|---|---|---|---|---|---|---|
| Pro Sesto | 1999–00 | 18 | 0 | ? | ? | — | — | — | — | ? | ? |
| Pro Sesto | 2000–01 | 24 | 0 | ? | ? | — | — | — | — | ? | ? |
| Club | Season | Serie C1 | | Coppa Italia Serie C | | | | Others | | Total | |
| Club | Season | App | Goals | App | Goals | App | Goals | App | Goals | App | Goals |
| Treviso | 2001–02 | 17 | 0 | ? | ? | — | — | ? | ? | ? | ? |
| Treviso | 2002–03 | 13 | 0 | ? | ? | — | — | — | — | ? | ? |
| Club | Season | Serie B | | Coppa Italia | | | | Others | | Total | |
| Club | Season | App | Goals | App | Goals | App | Goals | App | Goals | App | Goals |
| Treviso | 2003–04 | 28 | 2 | ? | ? | — | — | — | — | ? | ? |
| Treviso | 2004–05 | 40 | 0 | ? | ? | — | — | ? | ? | ? | ? |
| Club | Season | Serie A | | Coppa Italia | | UEFA Cup | | Others | | Total | |
| Club | Season | App | Goals | App | Goals | App | Goals | App | Goals | App | Goals |
| Treviso | 2005–06 | 29 | 2 | ? | ? | — | — | — | — | ? | ? |
| Palermo | 2006–07 | 8 | 0 | 1 | 0 | 5 | 0 | — | — | 14 | 0 |
| Parma | 2006–07 | 16 | 1 | — | — | — | — | — | — | 16 | 1 |
| Parma | 2007–08 | 16 | 0 | 1 | 0 | — | — | — | — | 0 | 0 |
| Total | | 209 | 5 | ? | ? | 5 | 0 | ? | ? | ? | ? |
