= 2013–14 AC ChievoVerona season =

Chievo
2013–14 season
- Chairman: Luca Campedelli
- Manager: Giuseppe Sannino (until 12 November 2013) Eugenio Corini
- Stadium: Stadio Marcantonio Bentegodi
- Serie A: 16th
- Coppa Italia: Round of 16
- Top goalscorer: League: Alberto Paloschi (13); All: Alberto Paloschi (15)
Home colours	Away colours	Third colours

The 2013–14 A.C. ChievoVerona season was the club's sixth consecutive season in Serie A.

== Players ==
Note: Flags indicate national team as defined under FIFA eligibility rules; some limited exceptions apply. Players may hold more than one non-FIFA nationality.

No.	Pos.	Nation	Player
1	GK	ITA	Christian Puggioni
2	DF	ITA	Alessandro Bernardini
3	DF	ITA	Dario Dainelli
4	DF	BRA	Claiton
5	DF	ITA	Michele Canini
6	MF	POL	Tomasz Kupisz
7	MF	SVN	Dejan Lazarević
8	MF	SRB	Ivan Radovanović
9	FW	ITA	Simone Bentivoglio
10	MF	ITA	Alessio Sestu
10	FW	NGA	Victor Obinna
11	FW	MLI	Mamadou Samassa
11	MF	ITA	Roberto Guana
12	DF	SVN	Boštjan Cesar
13	DF	ITA	Simone Aldovrandi
14	MF	ARG	Adrián Calello
15	DF	CRO	Manuel Pamić
16	FW	ITA	Riccardo Improta
17	DF	ITA	Gennaro Sardo
18	GK	ITA	Lorenzo Squizzi
19	DF	ARG	Leandro Paredes

No.	Pos.	Nation	Player
20	MF	PAR	Marcelo Estigarribia
21	DF	FRA	Nicolas Frey
22	MF	GHA	Boadu Maxwell Acosty
23	MF	ITA	Tiberio Guarente
24	MF	SEN	Maodo Malick Mbaye
25	GK	ITA	Michael Agazzi
26	DF	SEN	Ansoumana Sané
27	MF	ITA	Luca Rigoni
27	GK	ITA	Marco Silvestri
31	FW	ITA	Sergio Pellissier (captain)
32	DF	ITA	Nicolò Brighenti
33	DF	ROU	Paul Papp
33	DF	ITA	Matteo Rubin
39	MF	ROU	Adrian Stoian
43	FW	ITA	Alberto Paloschi
51	DF	ITA	Francesco Acerbi (on loan from Genoa)
56	MF	FIN	Përparim Hetemaj
77	FW	FRA	Cyril Théréau
90	FW	ITA	Matteo Ardemagni
93	DF	SEN	Boukary Dramé
95	FW	BRA	Victor Da Silva

== Competitions ==
=== Serie A ===
==== League table ====
Pos	Team	Pld	W	D	L	GF	GA	GD	Pts	Qualification or relegation
14	Genoa	38	11	11	16	41	50	−9	44 (Note: Udinese finished ahead of Genoa on head-to-head away goals scored: Udinese 1-0 Genoa, Udinese 3-3 Genoa.)	
15	Cagliari	38	9	12	17	34	53	−19	39	
16	Chievo	38	10	6	22	34	54	−20	36	
17	Sassuolo	38	9	7	22	43	72	−29	34	
18	Catania (R)	38	8	8	22	34	66	−32	32	Relegation to Serie B

Source: Serie A, Soccerway
Rules for classification: 1st points; 2nd head-to-head points; 3rd head-to-head goal difference; 4th goal difference; 5th number of goals scored; 6th public draw.
(Head-to-head record is applied for clubs with the same number of points only once all matches between said clubs have been played)
(R) Relegated
