= Davide Matteini =

Italian footballer (born 1982)

Personal information
- Date of birth: 11 May 1982 (age 44)
- Place of birth: Livorno, Italy
- Height: 1.80 m (5 ft 11 in)
- Position: Left winger

Senior career*
Years	Team	Apps	(Gls)
2000–2003	Empoli	1	(0)
2001–2002	→ Gualdo (loan)	32	(17)
2002–2003	→ Pro Patria (loan)	16	(5)
2003–2007	Palermo	1	(0)
2003–2004	→ Livorno (loan)	6	(1)
2004	→ Teramo (loan)	11	(4)
2004–2005	→ Padova (loan)	15	(8)
2005	→ Crotone (loan)	13	(1)
2005–2006	→ Pescara (loan)	33	(9)
2006–2007	→ Empoli (loan)	32	(4)
2007–2009	Parma	14	(2)
2008	→ Vicenza (loan)	17	(5)
2009–2010	Rimini	20	(1)
2010–2011	Cosenza	29	(1)
2011–2013	Reggiana	48	(8)
2013–2014	Tuttocuoio	12	(4)
2014	Viareggio	10	(2)
2014–2015	San Paolo Padova	16	(4)
Total		326	(76)
- * Club domestic league appearances and goals

Davide Matteini (born 11 May 1982) is an Italian former professional footballer who plays as a winger.

== Career ==
Matteini started his career at Empoli.

=== Palermo ===
After loaned to Serie C1 and Serie C2 clubs, he was signed by Palermo in January 2003, in joint-ownership bid, for €620,000. He just played once for Palermo in Serie B.

Matteini then left on loan to Serie B and Serie C1 clubs. After he scored the career high in Serie B with 9 goals, he was loaned back to Empoli, which still hold half of his contractual rights. He played his first Serie A games against UC Sampdoria, 10 September 2006. He played 19 starts in 2006–07 Serie A.

=== Parma ===
In June 2007, Palermo got full contractual rights from Empoli for €330,000, but sold to Parma F.C. in join-ownership in August 2007 for €0.9 million. The deal offset the installment payments of 2006 signing of Mark Bresciano and Fábio Simplício. Parma also signed Igor Budan and Francesco Parravicini from Palermo earlier in July. He was signed by Vicenza on 31 January 2008 along with Ascoli winger Giampietro Perrulli. Matteini made 14 starts in the second half of 2007–08 Serie B.

=== Rimini ===
In January 2009, he left for Rimini for €1 million (nominal value) from Parma, with Palermo retained 50% registration rights. Parma also got Francesco Lunardini (€1 million) and Daniele Vantaggiato (€1.9 million) from Rimini as part of the deal. Rimini reached the promotion playoffs in 2009–10 Lega Pro Prima Divisione but lost it. In June 2010 Palermo gave up the remain 50% registration rights but the Rimini soon bankrupted.

=== Late career ===
Matteini remained in the third division in 2010–11 season for Cosenza. However the team also bankrupted and Matteini joined Reggiana.

In October 2013 Matteini was signed by Tuttocuoio.

In January 2014 goes to Viareggio, while in September goes to San Paolo Padova in Serie D.

== Savona – Teramo matchfixing ==
On 20 August 2015 the player earned 3 years and 6 months ban for sports fraud by Italian Federation 1st degree judges. He allegedly participated in the matchfixing of Savona – Teramo and then bet on the match result.
