= Alberto Paloschi =

Italian footballer (born 1990)

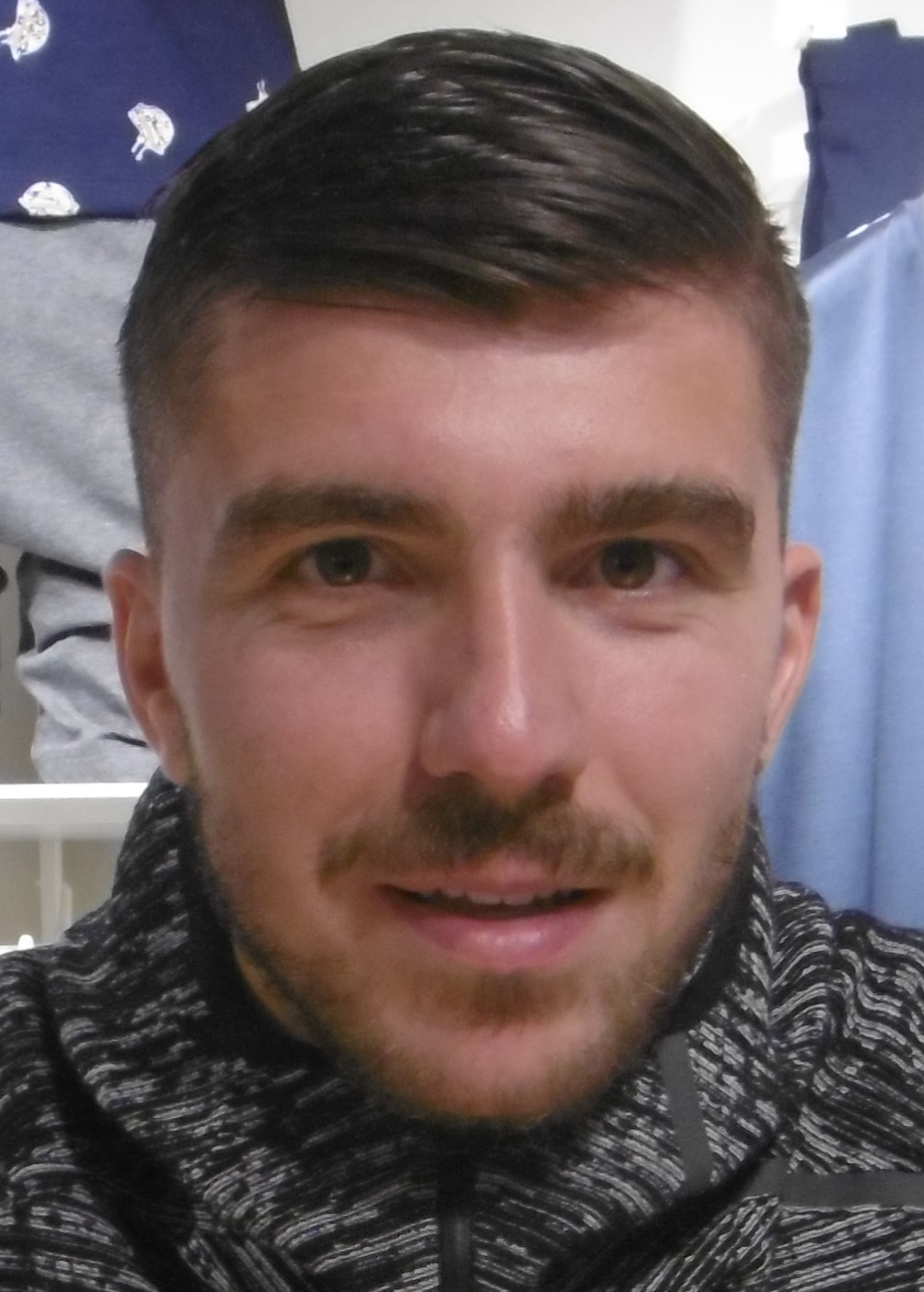
- Paloschi in 2018

Personal information
- Date of birth: 4 January 1990 (age 36)
- Place of birth: Chiari, Italy
- Height: 1.83 m (6 ft 0 in)
- Position: Striker

Team information
- Current team: Chievo
- Number: 43

Youth career
- AC Milan

Senior career*
| Years | Team | Apps | (Gls) |
| 2007–2008 | AC Milan | 7 | (2) |
| 2008–2011 | Parma | 57 | (16) |
| 2011 | Genoa | 12 | (2) |
| 2011–2016 | Chievo | 144 | (42) |
| 2016 | Swansea City | 10 | (2) |
| 2016–2018 | Atalanta | 13 | (0) |
| 2017–2018 | → SPAL (loan) | 36 | (7) |
| 2018–2021 | SPAL | 59 | (9) |
| 2020 | → Cagliari (loan) | 7 | (0) |
| 2021–2023 | Siena | 53 | (17) |
| 2023–2025 | Calcio Desenzano | 36 | (11) |
| 2025 | Pro Palazzolo | 18 | (12) |
| 2025– | Chievo | 16 | (4) |

International career
| 2006–2007 | Italy U17 | 9 | (4) |
| 2007–2008 | Italy U19 | 11 | (4) |
| 2008 | Italy U20 | 1 | (0) |
| 2008–2013 | Italy U21 | 29 | (9) |
- * Club domestic league appearances and goals as of 4 March 2026

Alberto Paloschi (Italian pronunciation: [alˈbɛrto paˈloski]; born 4 January 1990) is an Italian professional footballer who plays as a striker for Chievo.

== Club career ==
=== Milan ===
Paloschi won the National Under-17s Championship with Milan in the 2006–07 season. He scored 3 goals in a 4–0 win over Genoa in the final.

Paloschi made his professional debut on 20 December 2007, scoring in the first leg of the Coppa Italia round of 16 against Catania, and scored a second goal in the return leg on 16 January 2008.

He made his Serie A debut on 10 February 2008 against Siena replacing Serginho, and scored the game's only goal with his first touch, just seventeen seconds after coming on. He started the next Serie A match against Livorno. On 19 March he scored AC Milan's only goal in a 2–1 home loss against Sampdoria.

=== Parma ===
Upon Ronaldinho's signing for the club, Paloschi said that, as his first-team chances were threatened, he would consider a move (preferably on loan) away from San Siro. On 27 August he moved to Parma, who'd just been relegated to Serie B in a co-ownership deal worth €2.25 million. He scored 12 goals in his first season with Parma, helping the club return to the top flight after only one season in the Serie B. In June 2009, Milan and Parma reached an agreement which would see Paloschi return to Parma for the 2009–10 season.

=== Genoa ===
On 3 January 2011, Parma sold the 50% registration rights of Paloschi that the club held to Genoa for €4.35 million and signed 50% registration rights of Raffaele Palladino from Genoa for €3 million, which Milan and Juventus retained the other 50% registration rights respectively, effectively made Genoa pay Parma €1.35 million in cash plus Palladino for Paloschi. Genoa also signed Luca Antonelli for €7 million and sold Francesco Modesto to Parma for €2.5 million, effectively made Genoa pay €4.5 million cash plus Modesto to Parma for Antonelli.

Paloschi made 12 appearances for Genoa, scoring 2 goals in the process. In June 2011 Milan bought back Paloschi from Genoa for €5 million, €650,000 over the previous fee.

=== Return to Milan ===
At the end of 2010–11 season, Paloschi returned to Milan for €5 million on a five-year contract. Paloschi immediately left for Chievo in an initial temporary deal, with an option to buy.

=== Chievo ===
On 8 August 2011, Paloschi joined Chievo on loan for the 2011–12 season for a fee of €450,000. On 18 September 2011 he scored his first goal for Chievo in a 2–1 defeat against Parma. On 22 January 2012, Paloschi scored a brace against Lecce. In July 2012 the loan was renewed for another year for free. On 31 January 2013, Chievo signed Paloschi in a co-ownership deal for €3.5 million. On 19 June 2014, Chievo purchased the remaining 50% registration rights of Paloschi from Milan for another €3 million. On 30 June 2015, Paloschi signed a new four-year contract with Chievo.

=== Swansea City ===
On 29 January 2016, Paloschi joined Premier League club Swansea City on a three-and-a-half-year deal for a fee believed to be in the range of £8 million. The move reunited him with his former manager at Parma, Francesco Guidolin. He opened his Premier League scoring account against Tottenham Hotspur on 28 February.

=== Atalanta ===
On 17 June 2016, Paloschi returned to Italy, signing a deal with Atalanta.

=== SPAL ===
On 7 July 2017, Paloschi was loaned to newly promoted Serie A side SPAL. On 20 June 2018, SPAL decided to turn Paloschi's loan into a permanent deal for undisclosed fee.

=== Cagliari ===
On 31 January 2020, Paloschi joined Cagliari on loan until 30 June 2020.

=== Siena ===
On 19 August 2021, Serie C club Siena confirmed an agreement to sign free agent Paloschi on a contract until 2025.

== International career ==
Paloschi scored two goals for Italy in the 2008 UEFA European Under-19 Championship.

On 18 November 2008, he made his debut for the Italy U-21 squad in a friendly match against Germany. He was selected to represent Italy in the 2009 U-21 Championship in Sweden. In March 2014 Paloschi received a call-up from Cesare Prandelli. Paloschi was re-called by Antonio Conte on 31 May 2015, again for the training camp.

== Career statistics ==
As of match played 19 September 2021

Appearances and goals by club, season and competition
| Club | Season | League | | | National cup | | League cup | | Europe | | Total | |
| Club | Season | Division | Apps | Goals | Apps | Goals | Apps | Goals | Apps | Goals | Apps | Goals |
|---|---|---|---|---|---|---|---|---|---|---|---|---|
| AC Milan | 2007–08 | Serie A | 7 | 2 | 2 | 2 | — | | 0 | 0 | 9 | 4 |
| Parma | 2008–09 | Serie B | 39 | 12 | 0 | 0 | — | | — | | 39 | 12 |
| Parma | 2009–10 | Serie A | 17 | 4 | 1 | 0 | — | | — | | 18 | 4 |
| Parma | 2010–11 | Serie A | 1 | 0 | 0 | 0 | — | | — | | 1 | 0 |
| Parma | Total | | 57 | 16 | 1 | 0 | — | | — | | 58 | 16 |
| Genoa | 2010–11 | Serie A | 12 | 2 | 0 | 0 | — | | — | | 12 | 2 |
| Chievo | 2011–12 | Serie A | 32 | 5 | 4 | 1 | — | | — | | 36 | 6 |
| Chievo | 2012–13 | Serie A | 20 | 7 | 0 | 0 | — | | — | | 20 | 7 |
| Chievo | 2013–14 | Serie A | 34 | 13 | 3 | 2 | — | | — | | 37 | 15 |
| Chievo | 2014–15 | Serie A | 37 | 9 | 1 | 0 | — | | — | | 38 | 9 |
| Chievo | 2015–16 | Serie A | 21 | 8 | 1 | 0 | — | | — | | 22 | 8 |
| Chievo | Total | | 144 | 42 | 9 | 3 | — | | — | | 153 | 45 |
| Swansea City | 2015–16 | Premier League | 10 | 2 | 0 | 0 | 0 | 0 | — | | 10 | 2 |
| Atalanta | 2016–17 | Serie A | 13 | 0 | 1 | 0 | — | | — | | 14 | 0 |
| SPAL (loan) | 2017–18 | Serie A | 36 | 7 | 1 | 0 | — | | — | | 37 | 7 |
| SPAL | 2018–19 | Serie A | 23 | 2 | 2 | 0 | — | | — | | 25 | 2 |
| SPAL | 2019–20 | Serie A | 10 | 0 | 2 | 1 | — | | — | | 12 | 1 |
| SPAL | 2020–21 | Serie B | 26 | 7 | 2 | 1 | — | | — | | 28 | 8 |
| SPAL | Total | | 95 | 16 | 7 | 2 | — | | — | | 102 | 18 |
| Cagliari (loan) | 2019–20 | Serie A | 7 | 0 | 0 | 0 | — | | — | | 7 | 0 |
| Siena | 2021–22 | Serie C | 4 | 1 | 0 | 0 | — | | — | | 4 | 1 |
| Career total | | | 349 | 81 | 20 | 7 | 0 | 0 | 0 | 0 | 369 | 88 |
