= Luca Antonelli =

Italian footballer

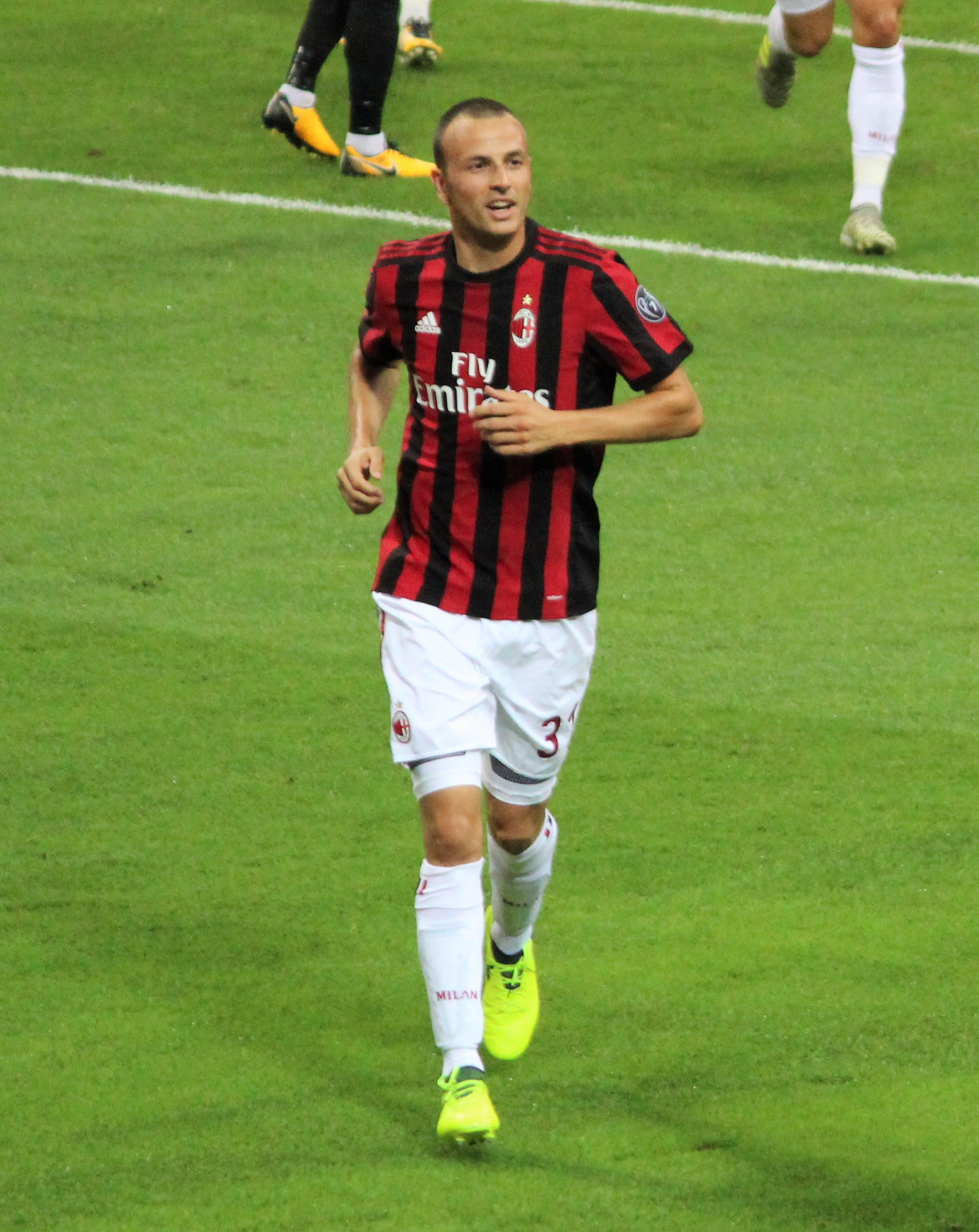
- Antonelli with A.C. Milan in 2017

Personal information
- Date of birth: 11 February 1987 (age 39)
- Place of birth: Monza, Italy
- Height: 1.84 m (6 ft 0 in)
- Position: Left-back

Youth career
- 2003–2004: Monza
- 2004–2007: A.C. Milan

Senior career*
Years	Team	Apps	(Gls)
2006–2008	A.C. Milan	1	(0)
2007–2008	→ Bari (loan)	17	(1)
2008–2011	Parma	58	(1)
2011–2015	Genoa	108	(8)
2015–2018	A.C. Milan	53	(4)
2018–2020	Empoli	25	(1)
2021–2022	Miami FC	19	(0)
Total		277	(15)

International career
2005	Italy U19	1	(0)
2007	Italy U20	1	(1)
2010–2016	Italy	13	(0)
- * Club domestic league appearances and goals as of 19 October 2022

Luca Antonelli (Italian pronunciation: [ˈluːka antoˈnɛlli]; born 11 February 1987) is an Italian former professional footballer who played as a left-back.

== Early life ==
Antonelli was born in Monza. He is the son of Roberto Antonelli, a former footballer who played for A.C. Milan from 1977 until 1982 as a striker.

== Club career ==
After spending a few seasons in the A.C. Milan youth teams, Antonelli made his first team debut in a Coppa Italia game against Brescia on 8 November 2006. On 23 December, he made also his Serie A debut, in a match against Udinese.

In the summer of 2007 Antonelli was loaned out to Serie B club Bari, but he impressed so much that during the January transfer window Parma secured him on loan from A.C. Milan for the rest of the Serie A season. He made his first appearance for the Gialloblu against Livorno on 16 March 2008.

=== Parma ===
In June 2008, Parma had acquired half of the contractual rights from Milan, for €750,000. While the following summer, he was fully transferred for another €2.5 million, which Milan made a financial income of €1.75 million as the value of the retained half had increased from €0.75 million to €2.5 million.

=== Genoa ===
In January 2011, Antonelli was transferred to Genoa for €7 million. Genoa also signed Alberto Paloschi for €4.35 million and sold Raffaele Palladino (€3 million) and Francesco Modesto (€2.5 million) to Parma. The club soon sold Domenico Criscito as Antonelli had succeeded Criscito as full back.

=== Return to A.C. Milan ===
In February 2015, Antonelli moved back to his debut club A.C. Milan, for a fee of €4.5 million signing a three-and-a-half-year contract.

On his debut for his return to Milan on 7 February 2015, Antonelli scored a goal from a corner kick off a header to tie the match with Juventus at 1–1, which did not prove decisive, as Milan eventually lost the match 3–1.

=== Empoli ===
On 11 August 2018, Antonelli transferred to Empoli. On 5 October 2020, his contract with Empoli was terminated by mutual consent.

=== Miami FC ===
On 17 February 2021, Antonelli was signed by USL Championship side Miami FC. On 10 November 2022, after two seasons with Miami, Antonelli announced his retirement from professional football.

== International career ==
Antonelli made his senior international debut with the Italy national team on 3 September 2010 against Estonia in Tallinn.

== Career statistics ==
=== Club ===
Appearances and goals by club, season and competition
Club	Season	League			National cup		Continental		Other		Total	
Club	Season	Division	Apps	Goals	Apps	Goals	Apps	Goals	Apps	Goals	Apps	Goals
Bari (loan)	2007–08	Serie B	17	1	3	0	—		—		17	1
Parma	2007–08	Serie A	8	0	0	0	—		—		8	0
Parma	2008–09	Serie B	14	0	2	0	—		—		16	0
Parma	2009–10	Serie A	24	1	1	0	—		—		25	1
Parma	2010–11	Serie A	12	0	0	0	—		—		12	0
Parma	Total		58	1	3	0	—		—		61	1
Genoa	2010–11	Serie A	11	1	0	0	—		—		11	1
Genoa	2011–12	Serie A	11	0	2	0	—		—		13	0
Genoa	2012–13	Serie A	33	1	1	0	—		—		34	1
Genoa	2013–14	Serie A	30	3	1	0	—		—		31	3
Genoa	2014–15	Serie A	19	3	1	0	—		—		20	3
Genoa	Total		104	8	5	0	—		—		109	8
A.C. Milan	2006–07	Serie A	1	0	2	0	—		—		3	0
A.C. Milan	2014–15	Serie A	12	1	0	0	—		—		12	1
A.C. Milan	2015–16	Serie A	28	3	4	0	—		—		32	3
A.C. Milan	2016–17	Serie A	7	0	1	0	—		1 (Note: Appearance in Supercoppa Italiana)	0	9	0
A.C. Milan	2017–18	Serie A	6	0	1	0	6 (Note: Appearances in UEFA Europa League)	1	—		13	1
A.C. Milan	Total		54	4	8	0	6	1	1	0	69	5
Empoli	2018–19	Serie A	13	0	0	0	—		—		13	0
Empoli	2019–20	Serie B	12	1	2	1	—		—		14	2
Empoli	2020–21	Serie B	0	0	0	0	—		—		0	0
Empoli	Total		25	1	2	1	0	0	0	0	27	2
Miami FC	2021	USLC	11	0	—		—		0	0	11	0
Miami FC	2022	USLC	8	0	0	0	—		0	0	8	0
Miami FC	Total		19	0	0	0	0	0	0	0	19	0
Career total			278	15	21	1	6	1	1	0	305	17

=== International ===
Appearances and goals by national team and year
National team	Year	Apps	Goals
Italy	2010	2	0
Italy	2011	0	0
Italy	2012	0	0
Italy	2013	4	0
Italy	2014	1	0
Italy	2015	3	0
Italy	2016	3	0
Total		13	0

== Honours ==
Milan

- UEFA Champions League: 2006–07
- Supercoppa Italiana: 2016
