= Reginaldo (footballer, born 1983) =

Brazilian footballer

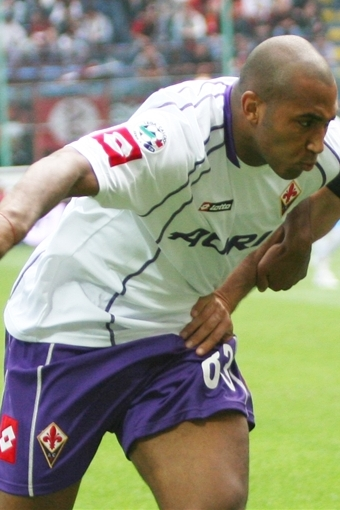
- Reginaldo for Fiorentina in 2007

Personal information
- Full name: Reginaldo Ferreira da Silva
- Date of birth: 31 July 1983 (age 43)
- Place of birth: Jundiaí, Brazil
- Height: 1.75 m (5 ft 9 in)
- Position: Second striker

Team information
- Current team: Catona

Youth career
- 1998–2001: Campo Grande

Senior career*
Years	Team	Apps	(Gls)
2001–2005	Treviso	73	(15)
2005–2006	Udinese	0	(0)
2005–2006	→ Treviso (loan)	31	(5)
2006–2007	Fiorentina	27	(6)
2007–2009	Parma	61	(8)
2009–2013	Siena	141	(17)
2012	→ JEF United Chiba (loan)	10	(0)
2013–2014	Vasco da Gama	9	(1)
2016–2017	Paganese	32	(11)
2017–2018	Trapani	21	(6)
2018	Pro Vercelli	18	(1)
2018–2019	Monza	35	(5)
2019–2020	Reggina	27	(4)
2020–2021	Catania	27	(2)
2021–2023	Picerno	55	(11)
2023–2024	Real Casalnuovo	31	(10)
2025–	Catona	2	(2)
- * Club domestic league appearances and goals as of 6 March 2025

Reginaldo Ferreira da Silva (born 31 July 1983) is a Brazilian professional footballer who plays as a second striker for Italian Prima Categoria amateur club Catona.

== Club career ==
=== Treviso ===
Born in Jundiaí, Brazil, Reginaldo started his career with Brazilian club Campo Grande. The club was associated with the football agency Pedrinho VRP, which helped numbers of male Brazilian footballers move to Italy. Reginaldo began his professional career with Treviso in 2001 and helped the club win promotion from the third-tier Serie C1 league to the top-flight Serie A championship (also due to the relegation of Genoa, as well as the expel of Torino and Perugia due to their financial difficulties). On 27 August 2005, Serie A club Udinese signed him outright (cash plus 50% registration rights of Dino Fava) from Treviso but loaning Reginaldo back to the Veneto club immediately.

=== Fiorentina ===
Following the relegation at the end of 2005–06 Serie A season, Reginaldo moved to Serie A club ACF Fiorentina from Udinese for €1 million. He played 27 games and scored six goals for Fiorentina during the 2006–07 Serie A season, after which he moved to league rivals Parma F.C., signing a 5-year contract.

=== Parma ===
Parma succeeded in signing Reginaldo for a €4.5 million fee. He was one of the forwards of the team along with Igor Budan, Cristiano Lucarelli and Bernardo Corradi. Reginaldo started most of the game, and Corradi was the second. That season Parma used a 4–3–3 or 4–5–1 formation, and Budan was the top scorer of 7 goals. Among the four goals were played along with Reginaldo.

Parma were relegated at the end of the 2007–08 Serie A season, but Reginaldo stayed with the club for the 2008–09 Serie B season. Having helped Parma win promotion for the 2009–10 Serie A, he moved to Serie A rivals A.C. Siena, signing a contract on 27 June 2009 in a co-ownership deal.

=== Siena ===
In June 2009 Siena signed Reginaldo from Parma in a co-ownership deal for a €2.5 million fee as well as Francesco Parravicini in a definitive deal for €2.5 million fee, as part of a cashless swap that Daniele Galloppa moved to Parma also in a co-ownership deal for €5 million fee. Reginaldo followed the team relegated to 2010–11 Serie B.

Under Antonio Conte, Reginaldo scored seven goals and won promotion back to Serie A. The co-ownership was also terminated in June 2011 as part of Galloppa and Gonçalo Brandão's deal. Parma got the full card of Galloppa for pre-agreed €5 million fee, while Siena got Reginaldo for pre-agreed €2.5M fee as well as Ângelo for €2.5 million fee.

=== JEF United Chiba ===
In March 2012, Siena announced that Reginaldo would go out on loan to Japanese club JEF United Chiba. The loan agreement was supposed to run until December 2012, but after ten games and no goals, he returned in June to Siena.

=== Vasco da Gama ===
Reginaldo returned to Brazil in June 2013 on a free transfer. After a series of disappointing performances, he was released.

=== Return to Italy ===
Circa mid-2016 Reginaldo returned to Italy for Serie C club Paganese. He was about to join Serie D club Sambenedettese in January 2016. However, the move was blocked by a non-EU players rule of Italian Football Federation, that amateur club can only sign two non-EU players, given an application was submitted on 31 December 2015. He obtained a resident status in Italy in February 2016, making him eligible for a European Union passport. (Note: Country was not specified in the news report, just cittadino comunitario.)

On 31 July 2017, Reginaldo was signed by another Serie C club Trapani on a one-year contract. In January 2018 he joined Serie B club Pro Vercelli.

In July 2018, Reginaldo joined Serie C club Monza.

On 17 July 2019, he joined Reggina.

On 17 September 2020 he signed a 2-year contract with Catania.

In September 2021, Reginaldo signed with Picerno.

After two Serie C seasons with Picerno, on 7 August 2023, Reginaldo moved down to Serie D to join newly promoted club Real Casalnuovo. After leaving Real Casalnuovo by the end of the season, he moved further down the leagues by joining Catona, a small Calabrian Prima Categoria amateur club, in January 2025.
