= Federico Rizzi =

Italian footballer

Personal information
- Date of birth: January 6, 1981 (age 45)
- Place of birth: Cremona, Italy
- Height: 1.78 m (5 ft 10 in)
- Position: Defender

Team information
- Current team: Salernitana

Senior career*
| Years | Team | Apps | (Gls) |
| 1999–2006 | Pizzighettone | 182 | (1) |
| 2006–2010 | Mantova | 74 | (2) |
| 2008 | → Triestina (loan) | 17 | (0) |
| 2010–2012 | Taranto | 39 | (0) |
| 2011 | → Cremonese (loan) | 9 | (0) |
| 2012–2013 | Trapani | 28 | (0) |
| 2013– | Salernitana | 1 | (0) |
- * Club domestic league appearances and goals as of 14:01, 4 October 2013 (UTC)

Federico Rizzi (born 6 January 1981 in Cremona) is an Italian footballer. He plays for U.S. Salernitana 1919.

== Career ==
Rizzi started his career at Pizzighettone in Province of Cremona. He played from Serie D and followed to club to reach Serie C1 in summer 2005.

In summer 2006, he was signed by Mantova of Serie B. After just made 5 appearances in 2007–08 season, he joined league rival Triestina on loan in mid-season.
