= Magnus Troest =

Danish footballer (born 1987)

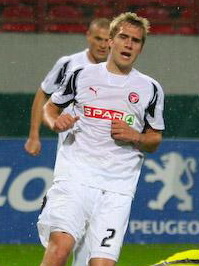
- Troest playing for Midtjylland in 2007

Personal information
- Date of birth: 5 June 1987 (age 39)
- Place of birth: Copenhagen, Denmark
- Height: 1.89 m (6 ft 2 in)
- Position: Centre-back

Team information
- Current team: Nocerina
- Number: 6

Youth career
- 2001–2003: B.93
- 2003–2005: Aston Villa

Senior career*
Years	Team	Apps	(Gls)
2005–2008	Midtjylland	75	(6)
2008–2009	Parma	28	(2)
2009–2012	Genoa	0	(0)
2009–2010	→ Recreativo (loan)	25	(1)
2010–2011	→ Atalanta (loan)	25	(1)
2011–2012	→ Varese (loan)	36	(2)
2012–2013	Varese	34	(5)
2013–2015	Lanciano	79	(3)
2015–2018	Novara	102	(3)
2018–2022	Juve Stabia	111	(3)
2023–2024	Cavese	30	(6)
2024–2025	Pompei	16	(2)
2025–	Nocerina	36	(1)

International career
2002	Denmark U16	3	(0)
2003–2004	Denmark U17	12	(2)
2004	Denmark U18	1	(0)
2005–2006	Denmark U19	7	(1)
2006–2008	Denmark U21	18	(2)
- * Club domestic league appearances and goals as of 25 Juny 2026

Magnus Troest (born 5 June 1987) is a Danish professional footballer who plays as a centre-back for Italian Serie D club Nocerina.

== Club career ==
=== Early years ===
Born in Copenhagen, Troest started playing football for several local clubs. He debuted for the Denmark U16 national team in October 2002, while playing for club B.93. In the summer 2003, the 16-year-old Troest moved abroad to play for English club Aston Villa. The club reportedly wanted to sign his big brother Jonas Troest from B.93 as well. Troest signed a three-year contract. He played two years in the youth academy, but did not get his senior debut for Aston Villa.

=== Midtjylland ===
In May 2005 he transferred back home to Denmark, to play for FC Midtjylland (FCM) in the top-flight Danish Superliga championship. He initially had to struggle to make the FCM first team, but finally made his senior debut in October 2005. He won the 2005 Danish under-19 Player of the Year award. From the second half of the 2005–06 season, he became a regular in the starting line-up. He scored his first two goals for FCM, as the club beat Aarhus GF 2–1 in March 2006.

=== Parma and Genoa ===
He then moved to Parma in 2008 (Parma re-sold half of the contract to Genoa C.F.C. for €1.5 million) and he again performed well, playing nearly 30 games and helping the club into Serie A.

Genoa bought back Troest in June 2009, for €900,000. Troest was one-year loaned to Recreativo de Huelva on 30 August 2009.

He spent the 2010–11 on loan at Atalanta. He played 25 times, and also scored once, the opener of a 2–2 home draw against Cittadella in the penultimate matchday. Atalanta won the championship for the sixth time in history after collecting 79 points, two more than Siena, the runner-up. This title was Troest first senior trophy.

=== Novara ===
On 3 August 2015, Troest joined Novara in Serie B. He left at the end of 2017–18 season, which saw the club relegated to third tier, after refusing to pen a new deal.

=== Juve Stabia ===
Troest remained in Italian second tier by completing a transfer to Juve Stabia, signing a two-year contract with an option to renew. He took squad number 20, and made his official debut for the club on 16 September 2018 by playing full-90 minutes in a 3–0 success at Siracusa.

=== Nola 1925 ===
On 9 February 2023, Troest joined Serie D side Nola 1925 on a free transfer.

== International career ==
Troest has amassed 31 appearances with Denmark youth teams.

== Personal life ==
Troest is the younger brother of AB player Jonas Troest. His sister, Stina Troest, is a hurdler who has competed 400 meter hurdles at the Youth Olympic Games in Singapore 2010 and won silver.

== Career statistics ==
As of match played 24 April 2022

Appearances and goals by club, season and competition
Club	Season	League			Cup		Continental		Other		Total	
Club	Season	Division	Apps	Goals	Apps	Goals	Apps	Goals	Apps	Goals	Apps	Goals
Midtjylland	2005–06	Danish Superliga	16	2	0	0	0	0	—		16	2
Midtjylland	2006–07	Danish Superliga	30	1	0	0	—		—		30	1
Midtjylland	2007–08	Danish Superliga	29	3	0	0	6 (Note: All appearance(s) in UEFA Cup)	1	—		35	4
Midtjylland	Total		75	6	0	0	6	1	—		81	7
Parma	2008–09	Serie B	29	2	0	0	—		—		29	2
Recreativo Huelva (loan)	2009–10	Segunda División	25	1	2	0	—		—		27	1
Atalanta (loan)	2010–11	Serie B	25	1	0	0	—		—		25	1
Varese	2011–12	Serie B	40	2	1	0	—		—		41	2
Varese	2012–13	Serie B	34	5	1	0	—		—		35	5
Varese	Total		74	7	2	0	—		—		76	7
Virtus Lanciano	2013–14	Serie B	38	3	0	0	—		—		38	3
Virtus Lanciano	2014–15	Serie B	41	0	2	0	—		—		43	0
Virtus Lanciano	Total		79	3	2	0	—		—		81	3
Novara	2015–16	Serie B	39	1	2	0	—		—		41	1
Novara	2016–17	Serie B	37	1	3	1	—		—		40	2
Novara	2017–18	Serie B	26	1	1	0	—		—		27	1
Novara	Total		102	3	6	1	—		—		108	4
Juve Stabia	2018–19	Serie C	34	1	0	0	—		—		34	1
Juve Stabia	2019–20	Serie B	31	1	1	0	—		—		32	1
Juve Stabia	2020–21	Serie C	28	1	2	0	—		—		30	1
Juve Stabia	2021–22	Serie C	21	0	0	0	—		—		21	0
Juve Stabia	Total		114	3	3	0	—		—		117	3
Career total			523	26	15	1	6	1	0	0	544	28

== Honours ==
Atalanta

- Serie B: 2010–11

Juve Stabia

- Serie C: 2018–19 (Group C)
