= Daniele Vantaggiato =

Italian footballer (born 1984)

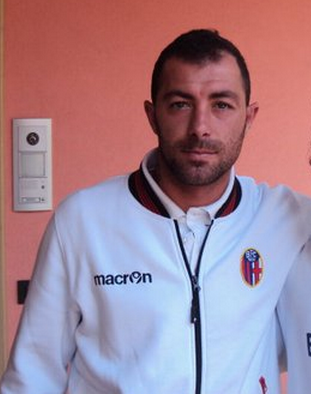

Personal information
- Date of birth: 10 October 1984 (age 42)
- Place of birth: Brindisi, Italy
- Height: 1.78 m (5 ft 10 in)
- Position: Striker

Team information
- Current team: Città di Carovigno 1949

Youth career
- 2001–2003: Bari

Senior career*
Years	Team	Apps	(Gls)
2003–2007	Bari	55	(7)
2003–2005	→ Crotone (loan)	57	(18)
2007	→ Pescara (loan)	15	(5)
2007–2009	Rimini	52	(25)
2009–2010	Parma	16	(4)
2009–2010	→ Torino (loan)	11	(0)
2010–2014	Padova	76	(20)
2011–2012	→ Bologna (loan)	2	(0)
2014–2018	Livorno	129	(54)
2018–2021	Ternana	81	(21)
2021–2022	Livorno	8	(0)
2022–2023	Fasano	18	(1)
2023–2024	Virtus Francavilla	4	(0)
2024	Brindisi	8	(0)
2024–2025	Avezzano	19	(0)
2026–	Città di Carovigno 1949		
- * Club domestic league appearances and goals as of 8 October 2026

Daniele Vantaggiato (born 10 October 1984) is an Italian professional footballer who plays as a striker for Città di Carovigno 1949.

== Career ==
=== Bari ===
Vantaggiato started his career at Bari. He made his Serie B debut on 26 January 2003, against Triestina.

He was sold to Crotone in joint-ownership bid in 2003, where he won Serie B promotion. Vantaggiato returned to Bari in June 2005. He was the regular of the squad before left for Pescara, who was then struggling to keep from relegation to Serie C1.

=== Rimini ===
In summer 2007, he left for Rimini for another joint-ownership bid, for €830,000, replacing Davide Moscardelli, after not appeared on the pre-season medical test for Bari. After Jeda left for Cagliari in January 2008, Vantaggiato became the team leading scorer. At the end of season Rimini won the blind bidding to have the full ownership for an undisclosed fee.

=== Parma ===
But in January 2009, his 13 goals scored in mid-season made Parma F.C. signed him (€1.9M) along with teammate Francesco Lunardini (€1M) in co-ownership deal, in exchange for Davide Matteini (50% for €1M) and Daniele Paponi on loan. Vantaggiato and Lunardini also cost Parma an additional €130,000 and €49,000 as other fee respectively. Parma won promotion back to Serie A as 2008–09 Serie B runner-up.

Vantaggiato was not featured in Parma's first three matches of 2009–10 Serie A, as the club signed new players. On 31 August 2009 he was loaned to Torino in exchange for Blerim Džemaili.

=== Padova ===
In January 2010, Parma acquired the remain 50% registration rights of Vantaggiato from Rimini for €1.9M (while Lunardini joined Parma outright in June from Rimini for €100,000), but re-sold the 50% registration rights to Calcio Padova for €1 million cash and 50% registration rights of Pietro Baccolo, which was valued for €1.5 million. Vantaggiato signed a 4 1/2-year contract. In June 2010 the co-ownerships were renewed.

In June 2011 both Parma and Padova gave up the remain 50% registration rights to opposite club.

==== Bologna (loan) ====
Vantaggiato then loaned to Serie A club Bologna F.C. 1909 in July 2011 with option to purchase. Vantaggiato signed a 1+2 year contract with the first year worth €842,165 in gross. Vantaggiato only played twice in October 2011.

==== Italian football scandal ====
In April 2012 Vantaggiato was questioned by the prosecutor for the matches during his stay in Rimini. In June 2012 he was banned for 3 years for involvement in 2011–12 Italian football scandal. His ban was reduced to 6 months by Tribunale Nazionale di Arbitrato per lo Sport of Italian National Olympic Committee.

==== Return to Padova ====
After the ban was reduced, Vantaggiato played an additional 37 Serie B games for Padova, 7 from 2012 to 2013 season and 30 from 2013 to 2014 season. On 7 August 2013 he signed a new 3-year contract with Padova. After the club failed to register for 2014–15 Lega Pro, he was released.

=== Livorno ===
Vantaggiato was signed by Livorno in summer 2014.

=== Return to Livorno ===
On 1 October 2021, he returned to newly reformed Livorno, now at amateur levels.

== Honours ==
=== Club ===
Crotone

- Serie C1 runner-up/promotion playoffs winner: 2004
