= Ansoumana Sané =

Senegalese footballer (born 1996)

Personal information
- Date of birth: 25 May 1996 (age 30)
- Place of birth: Thiès, Senegal
- Height: 1.77 m (5 ft 9 1/2 in)
- Position: Defender

Team information
- Current team: Chievo

Youth career
- –2014: Chievo

Senior career*
Years	Team	Apps	(Gls)
2014–	Chievo	0	(0)
2014–2015	→ Pro Piacenza (loan)	27	(0)
2015–2016	→ Pontedera (loan)	23	(0)
2016–2017	→ Pro Piacenza (loan)	24	(0)
2017–2018	→ Viterbese (loan)	19	(0)
2018–2019	→ Pro Patria (loan)	21	(0)
- * Club domestic league appearances and goals as of 12 May 2019

Ansoumana Sané (born 25 May 1996) is a Senegalese football player. He also holds Italian citizenship. He is under contract with Chievo.

== Club career ==
He made his Serie C debut for Pro Piacenza on 31 August 2014 in a game against Grosseto.
