= Francesco Luoni =

Italian footballer

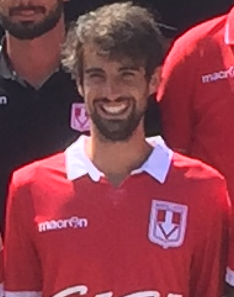

Personal information
- Date of birth: 9 April 1988 (age 38)
- Place of birth: Varese, Italy
- Height: 1.80 m (5 ft 11 in)
- Position: Right back

Team information
- Current team: GS Arconatese

Senior career*
Years	Team	Apps	(Gls)
2006–2008	Varese	31	(0)
2008–2013	AlbinoLeffe	88	(0)
2012–2013	→ Como (loan)	19	(0)
2013–2014	Castel Rigone	16	(0)
2014–2017	Varese	76	(3)
2017–2018	Lecco	31	(2)
2018–2019	Fanfulla	28	(0)
2019–2020	Seregno	12	(0)
2020–2021	Legnano	34	(1)
2021–	GS Arconatese	62	(2)
- * Club domestic league appearances and goals as of 4 October 2023

Francesco Luoni (born 9 April 1988) is an Italian professional football player who plays for GS Arconatese in Serie D.

== Career ==
=== Seregno ===
Luoni joined Seregno ahead of the 2019/20 season.
