= Daniele Galloppa =

Italian footballer (born 1985)

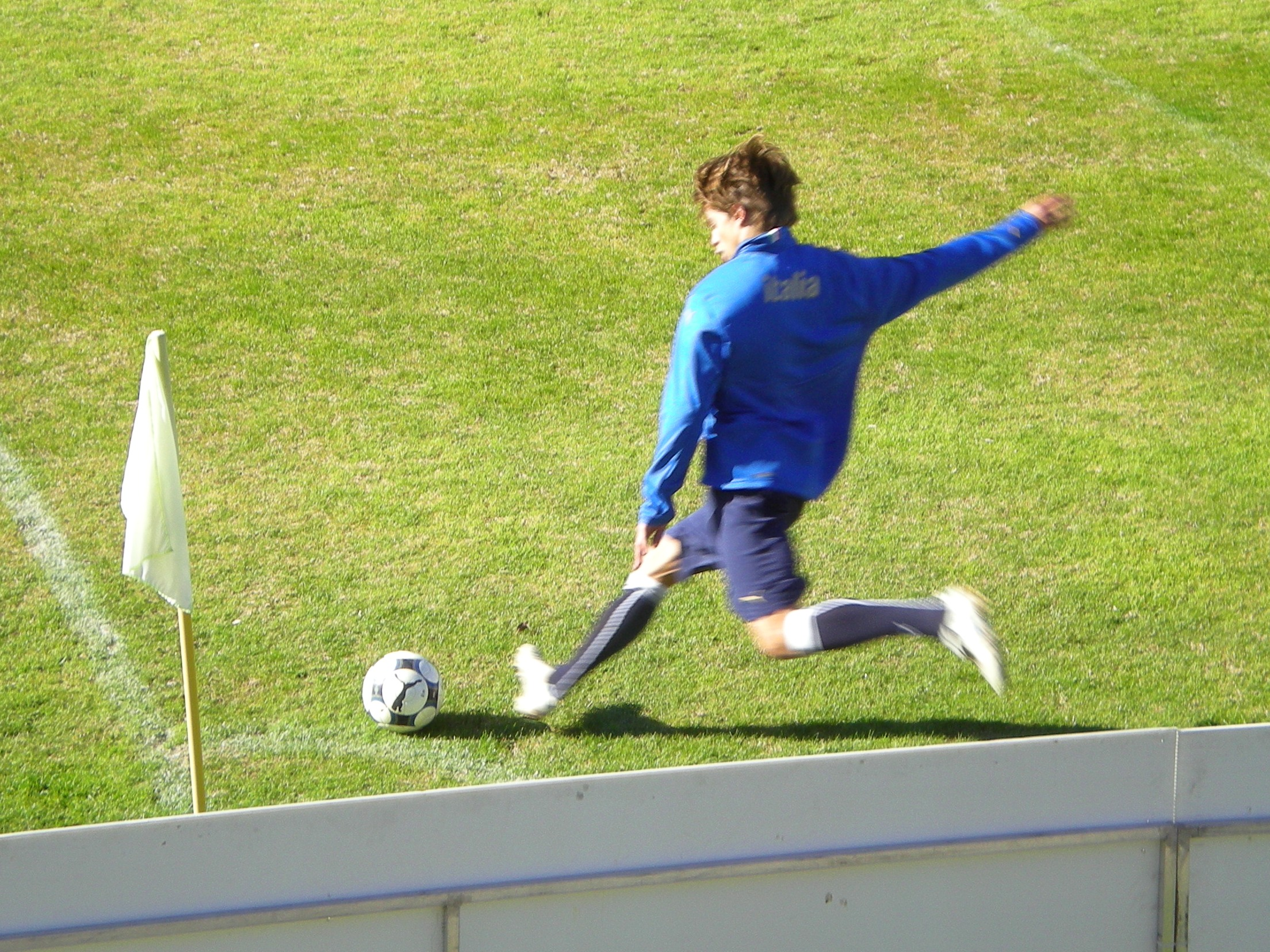
- Galloppa in 2009

Personal information
- Date of birth: 15 May 1985 (age 41)
- Place of birth: Rome, Italy
- Height: 1.85 m (6 ft 1 in)
- Position: Midfielder

Team information
- Current team: Modena (head coach)

Youth career
- Roma

Senior career*
Years	Team	Apps	(Gls)
2004–2007	Roma	0	(0)
2004–2006	→ Triestina (loan)	56	(1)
2006–2007	→ Ascoli (loan)	13	(0)
2007–2009	Siena	76	(3)
2009–2015	Parma	105	(4)
2015–2016	Modena	15	(1)
2017	Cremonese	0	(0)
2017	→ Carrarese (loan)	12	(0)
Total		277	(9)

International career
2003	Italy U18	2	(0)
2003–2004	Italy U19	13	(1)
2004–2006	Italy U20	16	(4)
2005–2006	Italy U21	5	(0)
2008	Italy U23	3	(0)
2009	Italy	2	(0)

Managerial career
- 2018–2019: Santarcangelo
- 2025: Fiorentina (interim)
- 2026–: Modena
- * Club domestic league appearances and goals

Daniele Galloppa (Italian pronunciation: [daˈnjɛːle ɡalˈlɔppa]; born 15 May 1985) is an Italian football manager and former footballer who played as a midfielder. He is currently the head coach of Serie B club Modena.

Although he was usually deployed as a central midfielder, he was also capable of playing as a left winger. Despite his ability and reputation as a promising prospect in Italian football, he has struggled with several injuries throughout his career.

== Club career ==
=== Roma ===
Born in Rome, Italy, Galloppa began playing football at the age of 5 in the Tor dé Cenci, the neighborhood where he lived as a child with his parents. At the age of nine, he joined local club Roma's youth system.

==== Loan to Triestina ====
On 9 July 2004, Galloppa moved on loan to Triestina in Serie B. He made his professional debut on 2 October 2004, in a match against Arezzo (a 1–2 loss), coming on for Marco Rigoni in the 61st minute. Galloppa spent two seasons with the club, making 56 appearances and scoring one goal. He registered his first professional goal of his career on 29 April 2006, against Crotone.

==== Loan to Ascoli ====
In August 2006, Galloppa joined Serie A club Ascoli on loan with an option to purchase. He made his Serie A debut on 17 September 2006, against Messina, coming on for Fabio Pecchia in the 27th minute of the second half.

=== Siena ===
On 30 January 2007, Galloppa was loaned to Siena. He played his first club match for Siena against Milan.

Galloppa was sold to Siena on 9 July 2007, in a co-ownership deal for €1.1 million. In June 2008, Siena signed the remain 50% registration rights of Galloppa for €1.75 million; 50% registration rights of Gianluca Curci for €1.75 million; Roma signed keeper Artur for €750,000, Simone Loria for €2.8 million in exchange. Thus, only €50,000 cash was involved.

=== Parma ===
On 26 June 2009, Galloppa left Siena to join Parma in a co-ownership deal, for €5 million. Parma also signed Manuel Coppola for €3 million and Siena signed Francesco Parravicini for €2.5 million and half of the registration rights of Reginaldo for €2.5 million. This only €3 million cash in the mega swap deals.

Galloppa instantly became a fixture in a newly promoted side that finished in an excellent seventh position in the 2009–10 season. In June 2010, the co-ownership between Parma and Siena on Galloppa and Reginaldo was renewed. The following season was disrupted by an anterior cruciate ligament injury to his left knee he sustained in a pre-season friendly against Shakhtar Donetsk on 10 August 2010, which kept him out until January 2011; as a result, Galloppa was able to make only 11 appearances (six as a substitute) all season. Nevertheless, Parma bought his registration outright in June 2011. Parma signed him for the pre-agreed price of €5 million, which Siena got Reginaldo also for the pre-agreed price of €2.5 million as well as full registration rights of Ângelo for €2.5 million, which a year before was a free agent.

On 21 October 2012, Galloppa injured the cruciate ligament of his left knee once again in a league match against Sampdoria, which ruled him out for the remainder of the season; he returned to action in the summer of 2013, in time for Parma's summer training camp. On 31 July 2013, Galloppa injured himself in a friendly match against Marseille, rupturing the anterior cruciate ligament of his right knee. He returned to action for the final match of the 2013–14 season. The next season, Galloppa made 19 appearances for Parma.

=== Modena ===
Following Parma's bankruptcy, on 8 September 2015, Galloppa was signed by Serie B club Modena, joining Hernán Crespo at the side, who had previously coached him at Parma. After making 15 appearances during the first half of the 2015–16 season, on 7 February 2016, Galloppa suffered yet another injury to the cruciate ligament of his right knee in a 0–0 home draw with Cesena, which ruled him out for the remainder of the season; this was his fourth significant knee injury in five years.

== International career ==
Galloppa was a member of the Italy U20 squad at the 2005 FIFA World Youth Championship. He scored two goals in the tournament, one in Italy's final match of the group stage on 18 June, a 4–1 win against Canada, and one in a 3–1 win against the United States in the round of 16, on 21 June, as Italy reached the quarter-finals of the tournament, only to lose to Morocco on penalties; Galloppa missed Italy's first penalty in the resulting shoot-out. He was later also capped for the Olympic U21 team at the 2008 Toulon Tournament, which the Italians proceeded to win.

On 6 June 2009, Galloppa made his senior national team debut in a friendly match in Pisa against Northern Ireland, coming on as a substitute in a 3–0 win. He made his second appearance for Italy later that year, in a 1–0 friendly home win against Sweden in Cesena, on 18 November.

== Coaching career ==
He became the assistant coach at Santarcangelo late in the 2017–18 season. Following the club's relegation to Serie D for the 2018–19 season, he was promoted to the head coach position on 13 August 2018. In his short stint, the club suffered a second consecutive relegation, this time to Eccellenza.

After a short period as youth coach of Vis Pesaro, Galloppa joined Fiorentina's youth coaching staff in 2020, first in charge of the Under-17 team and, from 2023, as the responsible of the Primavera Under-19 team.

On 4 November 2025, following the dismissal of Stefano Pioli, Galloppa was temporarily appointed in charge of the first team. He guided Fiorentina for the 2025–26 UEFA Conference League game against Mainz 05, which ended in a 1–2 loss, before handing over the coaching duties to Paolo Vanoli.

On 14 June 2026, Galloppa was announced as the new head coach of Serie B club Modena, signing a two-year contract with an option for a further year based on seasons results.
