= Daniele Paponi =

Italian footballer (born 1988)

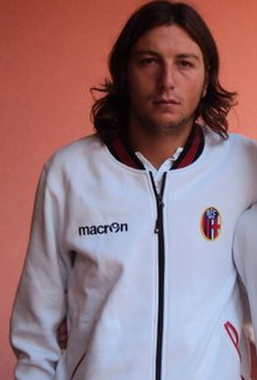
- Paponi with Bologna in 2011

Personal information
- Date of birth: 16 April 1988 (age 38)
- Place of birth: Ancona, Italy
- Height: 1.79 m (5 ft 10 1/2 in)
- Position: Forward

Team information
- Current team: Castelfidardo

Youth career
- –2004: Ancona
- 2004–2005: Parma

Senior career*
Years	Team	Apps	(Gls)
2005–2010	Parma	30	(3)
2008	→ Cesena (loan)	22	(2)
2009	→ Rimini (loan)	14	(1)
2009–2010	→ Perugia (loan)	21	(0)
2010–2015	Bologna	21	(2)
2013	→ Montreal Impact (loan)	16	(2)
2014–2015	→ Ancona (loan)	23	(5)
2015–2017	Latina	31	(4)
2017–2019	Juve Stabia	69	(23)
2019–2020	Piacenza	23	(13)
2020–2021	Padova	16	(0)
2021–2022	Bari	16	(3)
2023	Imolese	3	(0)
2023–2024	Fermana	17	(2)
2024–	Castelfidardo	10	(1)

International career
2007–2008	Italy U20	4	(0)
- * Club domestic league appearances and goals as of 17 November 2024

Daniele Paponi (born 16 April 1988) is an Italian footballer who plays as a forward for Serie D club Castelfidardo.

== Club career ==
=== Parma ===
Paponi started his career with Ancona, playing into the biancorossi youth ranks. In the summer 2004, following the folding of his club, Paponi became a free agent; he then accepted an offer from Parma and joined the ducali youth team.

He made his Serie A debut at the age of 17 on 22 October 2005, then also making his debut at the European level in the 2006–07 UEFA Cup, scoring also two goals. His first Serie A goal came in an away league match played against Messina on 20 December 2006, and ended in a 1–1 draw: Paponi's equaliser goal, a reversed bicycle kick immediately dubbed as "scorpion kick", was saluted among the finest scored in the league season. Nevertheless, Paponi struggled to find space in the first team in the following 2007–08 season, and in January 2008 he accepted a loan move to Serie B's Cesena, where he scored two goals in 21 games.

For the 2008–09 season he returned to Parma, then in Serie B, playing seven games and scoring twice, but in January 2009 he was loaned out again, this time to Rimini as part of the deal that brought then-Serie B topscorer Daniele Vantaggiato to join the gialloblu.

=== Bologna ===
On 10 June 2010 Parma exchanged the 22-year-old striker with Gabriele Paonessa of Bologna in co-ownership deal. Both players' 50% registration rights was valued €600,000. Paponi signed a 5-year contract worth €120,000 in net annually plus bonuses. The deal never a successful deal on the field as both players failed to take part in the first team, but a successful financial deal that both club had a player selling profit of €1.2 million in 2009–10 season but only would counter-weight by the amortization of the buying cost of the same amount in next 5 seasons (2010 to 2015, the contract length of both players) plus VAT. Paponi also became a financial burden of the club for his wage in 2013. Paponi only played once in 2011–12 Serie A. In June 2012, Paonessa was definitively under contract with Parma as well as Paponi to Bologna.

In 2012–13 Paponi missed a few games due to injuries. However, his own quality had limited his chance to play: only 3 games in 2012–13 Serie A, all as substitutes. In April 2013 he left for Canada to have a trial with Montreal Impact.

Montreal

On 19 April 2013 Paponi joined Montreal Impact on loan until 31 December 2013. He has officially scored his first goal for Montreal Impact on 29 June 2013 in an MLS match against Colorado Rapids, where he actually went on to score a brace.

Ancona

On 4 August 2014 he was signed by the third-tier club Ancona in temporary deal.

=== Latina ===
On 20 August 2015 Paponi was signed by U.S. Latina Calcio for free, with Marco Crimi moved to opposite direction. for €730,000. Paponi signed a 2-year contract.

=== Serie C clubs ===
Paponi left Latina for Juve Stabia on 20 January 2017. He renewed the contract on 11 August. He was part of the first team squad for the entire 2017 pre-season.

On 1 August 2019, he signed with Piacenza.

On 1 September 2020 he joined Padova on a 2-year contract.

On 1 September 2021, Paponi joined Serie C club Bari.

On 6 January 2023, Paponi signed with Imolese.

On 20 September 2023, Paponi signed a one-season contract with Fermana.

== Career statistics ==
As of match played 16 April 2022

Appearances and goals by club, season and competition
Club	Season	League			National Cup		Other		Total	
Club	Season	Division	Apps	Goals	Apps	Goals	Apps	Goals	Apps	Goals
Parma	2005–06	Serie A	5	0	1	0	—		6	0
Parma	2006–07	Serie A	11	1	2	0	—		13	1
Parma	2007–08	Serie A	7	0	1	0	—		8	0
Parma	2008–09	Serie B	7	2	2	1	—		9	3
Parma	Total		30	3	6	1	0	0	36	4
Cesena (loan)	2007–08	Serie B	22	2	—		—		22	2
Rimini (loan)	2008–09	Serie B	14	1	—		—		14	1
Perugia (loan)	2009–10	Lega Pro	21	0	—		—		21	0
Bologna	2010–11	Serie A	14	2	2	0	—		16	2
Bologna	2011–12	Serie A	1	0	3	1	—		4	1
Bologna	2012–13	Serie A	3	0	1	0	—		4	0
Bologna	2013–14	Serie A	3	0	0	0	—		3	0
Bologna	Total		21	2	6	1	0	0	27	3
Montreal Impact Reserves	2013	MLS Reserve League	1	2	—		—		1	2
Montreal Impact (loan)	2013	MLS	16	2	2	1	1 (Note: Appearance(s) in MLS Cup Playoffs)	0	19	3
Ancona (loan)	2014–15	Lega Pro	23	5	0	0	—		23	5
Latina	2015–16	Serie B	12	1	0	0	—		12	1
Latina	2016–17	Serie B	19	3	2	1	—		21	4
Latina	Total		31	4	2	1	0	0	33	5
Juve Stabia	2016–17	Lega Pro	14	4	—		2 (Note: Appearance(s) in Promotion Playoffs)	0	16	4
Juve Stabia	2017–18	Serie C	24	7	2	2	3	1	29	10
Juve Stabia	2018–19	Serie C	31	12	2	1	—		33	13
Juve Stabia	Total		69	23	4	3	5	1	78	27
Piacenza	2019–20	Serie C	23	13	2	0	—		25	13
Padova	2020–21	Serie C	16	0	1	0	6	0	23	0
Padova	2021–22	Serie C	0	0	1	0	—		1	0
Padova	Total		16	0	2	0	6	0	24	0
Bari	2021–22	Serie C	17	3	—		—		17	3
Career total			304	60	24	7	12	1	340	68

== Honours ==
Montreal Impact

- Canadian Championship (1): 2013

Bari

- Serie C: 2021–22 (Group C)
