= Nicola Pavarini =

Italian footballer (born 1974)

Personal information
- Date of birth: 24 February 1974 (age 52)
- Place of birth: Brescia, Italy
- Height: 1.90 m (6 ft 3 in)
- Position: Goalkeeper

Team information
- Current team: Parma (GK coach)

Youth career
- 1991–1994: Brescia

Senior career*
Years	Team	Apps	(Gls)
1994–2001	Brescia	16	(0)
1995–1996	→ Cremapergo (loan)	31	(0)
1999–2000	→ Gualdo (loan)	25	(0)
2001	→ Cesena (loan)	0	(0)
2001–2003	Acireale	32	(0)
2003–2004	Livorno	37	(0)
2004–2006	Reggina	42	(0)
2006–2007	Siena	0	(0)
2007	→ Lecce (loan)	17	(0)
2007–2014	Parma	69	(0)
Total		269	(0)

Managerial career
- 2014–2015: Parma (goalkeeping youth coordinator)
- 2017–2018: Juventus (scout)
- 2018–2019: Juventus (goalkeeping youth coordinator)
- 2019–2022: Italy (goalkeeping youth coordinator)
- 2022–2023: Fatih Karagümrük (GK coach)
- 2023–2024: Sampdoria (GK coach)
- 2025–: Parma (GK coach)
- * Club domestic league appearances and goals

Nicola Pavarini (born 24 February 1974) is an Italian former professional footballer who played as a goalkeeper.

== Playing career ==
Pavarini started his career at Brescia. After he made his first team debut in the 1996–97 Serie B season, he was loaned to Serie C1 clubs Gualdo and Cesena.

In summer 2001, he left for Acireale of Serie C2, where his started to play regularly in the second season. in summer 2003 he moved back to Serie B for Livorno, replacing Marco Amelia who left Livorno on loan.

Pavarini was signed for Reggina in summer 2004, along with new signing Salvatore Soviero to compete the first choice. In 2005–06 season, he became new signing Ivan Pelizzoli backup. But due to his injury, he managed to play 18 Serie A games.

In June 2006, he was signed by another Serie A club Siena, replacing Antonio Mirante and Marco Fortin. But he played as Austrian international Alexander Manninger's backup. In January 2007, he was exchanged with Francesco Benussi of U.S. Lecce, joining the Serie B team on loan.

In August 2007, he joined Parma and became first choice after the 2008 departure of Luca Bucci. He won promotion back to Serie A in the 2008–09, but lost his place in the team to new signing Antonio Mirante in the summer of 2009 and made just five league appearances in the following two seasons. After injuries to Mirante in 2011–12, Pavarini made 10 league appearances.

On 15 May 2014, Pavarini announced his retirement at the end of the season after seven years at Parma.

== Coaching career ==
In 2014, Pavarini was appointed goalkeeping coach coordinator at Parma. He then became a goalkeeping coach coordinator for the youth teams of Juventus (2018 to 2019), and the Italian youth national teams (2019 to 2022).

In 2022, Pavarini joined Andrea Pirlo's coaching staff at Fatih Karagümrük (2022–23), working as a goalkeeping coach. He successively followed Pirlo at Sampdoria in July 2023 after the latter was appointed the club's new head coach.

== Honours ==
Brescia

- Serie B: 1996–97
