= Paolo Castellini =

Italian footballer

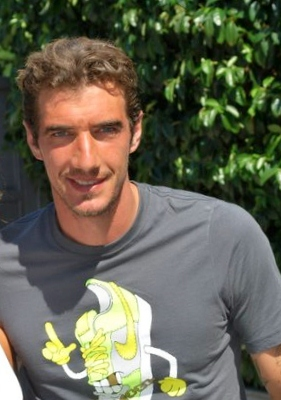
- Castellini in 2011

Personal information
- Full name: Paolo Castellini
- Date of birth: 25 March 1979 (age 47)
- Place of birth: Brescia, Italy
- Height: 1.84 m (6 ft 0 in)
- Position: Left back

Youth career
- Cremonese

Senior career*
Years	Team	Apps	(Gls)
1996–2000	Cremonese	64	(0)
2000–2004	Torino	114	(1)
2004	→ Brescia (loan)	16	(0)
2004–2006	Betis	13	(0)
2006–2012	Parma	136	(1)
2010–2011	→ Roma (loan)	8	(0)
2011–2012	→ Sampdoria (loan)	20	(0)
2012–2014	Sampdoria	8	(0)
2014	Livorno	15	(0)
2014–2015	Cremonese	23	(0)
2015–2016	Brescia	20	(0)
Total		437	(2)

International career
1998–2000	Italy U20	8	(0)
2001–2002	Italy U21	9	(0)
- * Club domestic league appearances and goals

Paolo Castellini (born 25 March 1979) is an Italian former professional footballer who played as a left back.

== Club career ==
Born in Brescia, Lombardy, Castellini made his professional debut at U.S. Cremonese at only 17, going on to appear for the club in both the Serie B and Serie C1. In summer 2000 he signed with Torino FC, achieving promotion to Serie A in his first season whilst appearing in 33 games.

From January 2004, Castellini served a loan at his hometown side, Brescia Calcio of the top division, after which he was released by Toro. In the ensuing summer he moved to Spain, joining La Liga's Real Betis on a five-year contract. His spell in Andalusia was disastrous, as he never dislodged veteran Luis Fernández from his starting position, also suffering with injuries (torn ligaments and cartilage in his right knee).

After cutting ties with Betis, Castellini returned to his country in the summer of 2006, joining Parma F.C. and being first choice from the beginning. In his third season he played 41 out of 42 matches, helping the team return to the top level after only one year.

In the 2009–10 campaign, Castellini often played as wingback in a 3–5–2 or 5–3–2 formation, with Cristian Zaccardo in the other flank. He helped Parma to a final eighth position, narrowly missing out on qualification for the UEFA Europa League.

On 26 August 2010, Castellini was loaned to AS Roma as cover for John Arne Riise. On 24 June 2011, also on loan, he signed for UC Sampdoria of the second tier; he agreed to a permanent deal at the latter on 9 July 2012, with Jonathan Biabiany heading in the opposite direction.

Castellini played in all three major levels until his retirement in 2016, representing A.S. Livorno Calcio, Cremonese and Brescia.

== International career ==
Castellini never won one full cap for Italy, but appeared with the under-21s at the 2002 UEFA European Championship, helping the national side to the semi-finals.

== Honours ==
Torino

- Serie B: 2000–01
