= Alessandro Budel =

Italian footballer (born 1981)

Personal information
- Date of birth: 25 February 1981 (age 45)
- Place of birth: Basiglio, Italy
- Height: 1.83 m (6 ft 0 in)
- Position: Midfielder

Senior career*
Years	Team	Apps	(Gls)
2000–2002	Milan	0	(0)
2000–2002	→ Spezia (loan)	46	(1)
2002–2003	Triestina	33	(0)
2003–2005	Milan	0	(0)
2003–2004	→ Lecce (loan)	7	(0)
2004	→ Genoa (loan)	20	(0)
2004–2005	→ Parma (loan)	10	(0)
2005	→ Cagliari (loan)	14	(0)
2005–2008	Cagliari	69	(1)
2008	Empoli	19	(2)
2008–2010	Parma	36	(3)
2010–2016	Brescia	157	(4)
2011	→ Torino (loan)	16	(0)
2016–2017	Pro Vercelli	27	(0)
Total		454	(11)

International career
2003	Italy U21 "B"	1	(0)
- * Club domestic league appearances and goals

Alessandro Budel (born 25 February 1981) is an Italian former professional footballer who played as a midfielder.

== Club career ==
=== Milan ===
Born in Basiglio, in the Province of Milan, Budel started his career at A.C. Milan. However, he never played for the team in Serie A. He spent two seasons on loan at Serie C1 club Spezia from 2000 to 2002. In June 2002, Budel, Ferri, and Baù were signed by Serie B club Triestina in co-ownership deals for a total fee of 1 billion lire (about €516,457).

=== Triestina ===
Budel spent a season with Serie B club Triestina from June 2002 to June 2003. On 11 June 2003 Milan bought back Budel.

=== Return to Milan ===
In June 2003 Milan bought back Budel for €2 million fee, with Ferri moved to Trieste outright for a fee of another €2 million, making the deal an effective cashless swap. However, Budel spent two seasons on loan to 3 Serie A and 1 Serie B clubs. On 1 July 2005, Cagliari signed him outright, after the expiry of a loan at the Sardinian club.

=== Cagliari ===
Budel was signed by Cagliari on 31 January 2005, initially in a season-long loan deal. On 1 July 2005, the club signed him outright for a reported three-year contract. After a bar fight between Davide Marchini and allegedly Pasquale Foggia, Budel was sided with Marchini. However, both Budel and Marchini were suspended by the club, according to his personal statement on TV in March 2008. Budel was fined €1,000 for his statement as well as public opinion he gave on Cagliari chairman Massimo Cellino, by the Italian Football Federation in September 2008.

Budel was released by Cagliari in January 2008.

=== Empoli ===
Budel was signed by Empoli F.C. in January 2008. He only spent 6 months with the club.

=== Return to Parma ===
Budel was signed by Parma as a free agent in 2008.

=== Brescia ===
In January 2010, Budel (50% rights tagged for €2.5 million) and Nicolás Córdova (50% rights tagged for €1 million) were part of a cashless player swap with Brescia for Andrea Rispoli (50% rights tagged for €3.5 million). Both Parma and Brescia made a capital gain of about €7 million for 2009–10 financial year, but in term of the value of the registration rights of their new signings. The two clubs retained the 50% registration rights of the three players. Budel signed a 3 1/2-year contract.

In June 2011, Parma and Brescia acquired the remaining rights for free. He also signed a new contract in 2011, but with wage reduction.

On 9 September 2014, Budel signed a new contract with Brescia again. However, he sustained a season-long injury in October 2014.

=== Pro Vercelli ===
On 1 February 2016, Budel joined Pro Vercelli on a free transfer.

== International career ==
Budel and fellow Milan youth products Baù and Antonini were included in Italy under-21 Serie B representative team in 2003. They won 2–1 against Belgium U21 team.
