= Antonino D'Agostino =

Italian footballer (born 1978)

Personal information
- Date of birth: 8 October 1978 (age 48)
- Place of birth: Turin, Italy
- Height: 1.73 m (5 ft 8 in)
- Position: Midfielder

Senior career*
Years	Team	Apps	(Gls)
1997–1998	Lascaris	23	(5)
1998–2002	Pro Vercelli	132	(13)
2003–2005	Treviso	76	(6)
2005–2009	Atalanta	22	(2)
2006–2007	→ Cagliari (loan)	38	(1)
2008	→ Treviso (loan)	6	(0)
2009	→ Parma (loan)	3	(0)
2009–2010	Progetto Sant'Elia		
2010–2011	Ascoli	7	(0)
2011	Gloria Bistriţa	4	(1)
2011–2013	Selargius Calcio	22	(2)
2013–2019	Tortoli Calcio		
2019–2020	Monastir Kosmoto		
- * Club domestic league appearances and goals

Antonino D'Agostino (born 8 October 1978) is an Italian former professional footballer who played as a midfielder in Serie A for Atalanta and Cagliari.

== Career ==
D'Agostino started his career at the CND team Lascaris, and joined the Serie C2 team U.S. Pro Vercelli Calcio in 1998. He was spotted by Serie B team Treviso F.B.C. 1993 in January 2003 on a co-ownership deal, and Treviso obtained full ownership a year later.

=== Atalanta ===
D'Agostino was sold to Udinese Calcio in June 2005. However, on 1 July 2005, D'Agostino was sold to Atalanta BC in a co-ownership deal for €800,000 in a five-year contract, as part of a mega swap deal with the relegated side. (Manfredini and D'Agostino to Atalanta for €2 million; 50% registration rights of Motta (€2.05 million), Rossini (€450,000) and Morosini; 100% registration rights of Gotti and Natali to Udinese for undisclosed fees.)

In June 2006, Atalanta signed D'Agostino outright for free; Udinese signed Morosini for an undisclosed fee, Rossini for free.

He was loaned to Cagliari in the same summer, playing his first Serie A season. The club decided not to sign him at the end of the season.

On 2 February 2009, he was loaned to Parma. On 17 July 2009, his contract with Atalanta was mutually terminated.

=== Late career ===
In September 2009, he was announced as new signing for Cagliari-based Eccellenza Sardinia club Progetto Sant'Elia. He returned into professionalism only a few months later, joining Ascoli in January 2010. In 2011, he came to Romania by signing with Gloria Bistriţa.

After six and a half seasons with Tortoli Calcio, 41-year-old D'Agostino joined ASD Monastir Kosmoto playing in the Calcio a 5 Serie B on 23 December 2019.
