= Massimo Paci =

Italian football manager (born 1978)

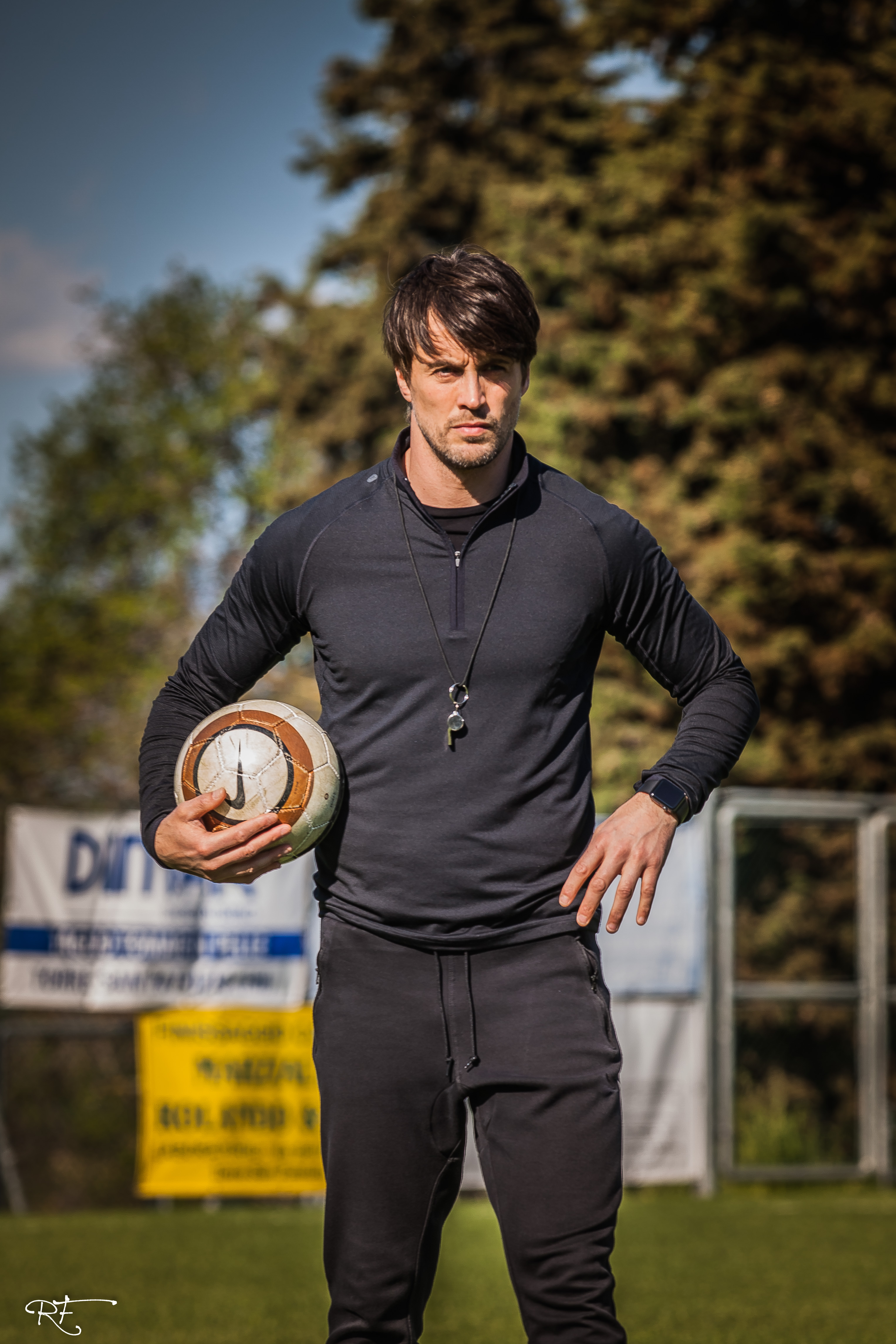

Personal information
- Date of birth: 9 May 1978 (age 48)
- Place of birth: Porto San Giorgio, Italy
- Height: 1.88 m (6 ft 2 in)
- Position: Defender

Team information
- Current team: Barletta (head coach)

Youth career
- 1995–1997: Ancona

Senior career*
Years	Team	Apps	(Gls)
1997–1998	Ancona	8	(0)
1998–1999	Juventus	0	(0)
1999–2000	Ancona	11	(1)
2000–2002	Viterbese	45	(2)
2002–2004	Ternana	65	(2)
2004–2005	Lecce	12	(1)
2005–2006	Genoa	0	(0)
2005–2006	→ Ascoli (loan)	31	(3)
2006–2011	Parma	124	(5)
2011–2012	Novara	26	(1)
2012–2013	Siena	23	(2)
2013–2014	Brescia	25	(1)
2014–2015	Pisa	22	(0)

Managerial career
- 2016: Civitanovese
- 2017–2019: Montegiorgio
- 2019–2020: Forlì
- 2020–2021: Teramo
- 2021: Pordenone
- 2022–2023: Pro Vercelli
- 2024: Pro Sesto
- 2025: Lumezzane
- 2026-: Barletta
- * Club domestic league appearances and goals

Massimo Paci (born 9 May 1978) is an Italian football coach and a former player who is the head coach of Barletta.

== Biography ==
Paci started his career at Ancona. He made his Serie A debut for Lecce on 18 September 2004 against Brescia. In July 2005, he was signed by Genoa, but after Genoa Serie A place was cancelled due to match-fixing, he was loaned to Ascoli which replace Genoa in Serie A.

Paci moved to Parma in 2006 for €1.8 million in a 4-year contract. He made 124 appearances in 5 years before his 2011 departure as vice-captain to Novara for free. On 20 July 2012 he was signed by A.C. Siena, with Lorenzo Del Prete moved to opposite direction.

On 4 July 2014 Paci was signed by Serie B club Brescia in a 1-year contract.

On 28 July 2014 he was signed by Lega Pro club Pisa.

== Coaching career ==
After retiring, he became a part of Marco Schenardi's coaching staff at Civitanovese. In September 2015, he then moved to The United States to participate in master courses reserved for coaches. He returned to Italy in 2016 and became manager of Civitanovese on 8 February 2016. He was in charge until the end of the season.

In July 2017, he became manager of Montegiorgio Calcio. He left the club on 8 May 2019. Paci was later announced as manager of Forlì FC for the 2019/20 season.

On 21 August 2020, he was hired by Serie C club Teramo. After guiding Teramo to the promotion playoff, which ended in a first-round loss to Palermo, he was hired by Serie B club Pordenone on a two-year deal. He was dismissed on 30 August 2021 following three defeats in the first three official games of the season.

On 1 July 2022, Paci was announced as the new head coach of Serie C club Pro Vercelli. He was dismissed on 20 February 2023 together with his assistant Roberto Guana.

On 23 January 2024, Paci returned to management as the new head coach of struggling Serie C club Pro Sesto until the end of the season. However, he resigned just a month later, on 25 February, after failing to improve the team's results.

== Career statistics ==
Club performance			League		Cup		Continental		Total	
Season	Club	League	Apps	Goals	Apps	Goals	Apps	Goals	Apps	Goals
Italy			League		Coppa Italia		Europe		Total	
1997–98	Ancona	Serie B	8	0						
1998–99	Juventus	Serie A	0	0						
1999–00	Ancona	Serie C1	11	1						
2000–01	Viterbese	Serie C1	18	0						
2001–02	Viterbese	Serie C1	27	2						
2002–03	Ternana	Serie B	32	2						
2003–04	Ternana	Serie B	33	0						
2004–05	Lecce	Serie A	12	1						
2005–06	Ascoli	Serie A	31	3						
2006–07	Parma	Serie A	25	0			4	0		
2007–08	Parma	Serie A	22	4	1	0	—		23	4
2008–09	Parma	Serie B	31	1	1	0	—		32	1
2009–10	Parma	Serie A	27	0			—			
2010–11	Parma	Serie A	19	0	2	0	—		21	0
2011–12	Novara	Serie A	26	1	2	0	—		28	1
2012–13	Siena	Serie A	23	2	2	0	—		25	2
Career total			345	17						

== Managerial statistics ==
As of match played 29 August 2021

Managerial record by team and tenure
Team	Nat	From	To	Record							
Team	Nat	From	To	G	W	D	L	GF	GA	GD	Win %
Civitanovese	(Italy)	8 February 2016	31 May 2016	9	3	3	3	13	12	+1	33.33
Montegiorgio	(Italy)	1 July 2017	8 May 2019	71	31	19	21	81	79	+2	43.66
Forlì	(Italy)	11 June 2019	20 May 2020	26	9	8	9	29	28	+1	34.62
Teramo	(Italy)	21 August 2020	3 June 2021	39	14	13	12	40	38	+2	35.90
Pordenone	(Italy)	3 June 2021	30 August 2021	3	0	0	3	1	9	−8	0.00
Total				148	57	43	48	164	166	−2	38.51

== Honours ==
- Serie B Runner-up: 2009
- Serie C1 Promotion Playoffs Winner: 2000
