= Alessio Manzoni =

Italian footballer (born 1987)

Personal information
- Date of birth: 10 April 1987 (age 39)
- Place of birth: Crema, Italy
- Height: 1.77 m (5 ft 10 in)
- Position: Midfielder

Team information
- Current team: US Scannabuese

Youth career
- –2006: Atalanta

Senior career*
Years	Team	Apps	(Gls)
2006–2009	Atalanta	1	(0)
2007	→ Padova (loan)	12	(0)
2007–2008	→ Spezia (loan)	10	(1)
2009	→ Parma (loan)	5	(1)
2009–2013	Parma	1	(0)
2010	→ Brescia (loan)	2	(0)
2010–2011	→ AlbinoLeffe (loan)	0	(0)
2011–2012	→ Frosinone (loan)	8	(0)
2012–2013	→ Gubbio (loan)	8	(0)
2013–2014	Pavia	18	(2)
2014–2015	Pergolettese	29	(3)
2015–2016	Caravaggio	25	(1)
2016–2020	Pergolettese	95	(4)
2020–2021	AC Ponte San Pietro	13	(2)
2021–2022	Codogno		
2022–	US Scannabuese		

International career
2003	Italy U16	4	(0)
2006	Italy U20	1	(0)
- * Club domestic league appearances and goals as of 9 October 2026

Alessio Manzoni (born 10 April 1987) is an Italian professional footballer who plays as a midfielder for US Scannabuese.

== Career ==
=== Early years ===
Manzoni made his senior debut for Atalanta in a Serie B match towards the end of the 2005–06 Serie B season. The game ended 1–0 to Modena. Since then, Manzoni has been on loan at both Padova and Spezia.

=== Parma ===
In February 2009, he left for Parma in temporary deal. In summer 2009 Manzoni was signed by Parma in three-year contract for €1.5 million (counter-weight Luca Cigarini transfer fee); Atalanta also retained 50% registration rights. Since January 2010 Manzoni was farmed to various clubs in Serie B and Lega Pro Prima Divisione. In June 2011 Atalanta gave up the remain half of the "card" to Parma.

In July 2012 Manzoni was signed by Gubbio. That season Parma signed Daniele Bazzoffia for undisclosed fee and Mário Rui for €595,000 from Gubbio; Gubbio signed Manzoni, Pietro Baccolo, Jacopo Galimberti and Francesco Pambianchi in temporary deals, subsidized by Parma by performance bonuses (Italian: premi di valorizzazione). Eventually Gubbio received €548,000 from the loan of Manzoni, Baccolo and Galimberti.

=== Pavia ===
In November 2013 he was signed by Pavia as free agent.

=== Serie D and return to Serie C ===
After leaving Pavia, he spent the next 5 seasons in the Serie D, 4 of them at Pergolettese, which advanced back to Serie C for the 2019–20 season.
