= Francesco Lunardini =

Italian footballer

Personal information
- Date of birth: 3 November 1984 (age 41)
- Place of birth: Cesena, Italy
- Position: Midfielder

Senior career*
Years	Team	Apps	(Gls)
2001–2009	Rimini	44	(0)
2003–2004	→ Val di Sangro (loan)	25	(1)
2004–2007	→ Pavia (loan)	83	(0)
2009–2013	Parma	37	(1)
2010–2011	→ Triestina (loan)	12	(2)
2011–2012	→ Gubbio (loan)	21	(1)
2012–2013	→San Marino (loan)	29	(0)
2013–2016	Fano	86	(1)
2016–2017	Matelica	20	(3)
2017–2019	Recanatese	46	(0)
2019–2020	Tre Fiori	1	(0)
- * Club domestic league appearances and goals

Francesco Lunardini (born 3 November 1984) is an Italian former professional footballer who played as a midfielder.

== Career ==
Lunardini began his career with Rimini in 2001, where he spent loan spells at Val di Sangro and Pavia. He signed for Parma in January 2009 for €1 million along with Daniele Vantaggiato (€1.9M) in a co-ownership deal. In June 2010, Parma acquired Lunardini outright for €100,000 (and Vantaggiato for €1.9M in January).

Lunardini then moved to Serie B outfit Triestina in August 2010 for a season-long loan. In summer 2011 he was signed by Gubbio along with Daniel Ciofani. Parma subsidized Gubbio €170,000 as premi di valorizzazione. On 22 August 2012 he was signed by San Marino. In 2013, Parma mutually terminated Lunardini's contract.

He was signed by Serie D club Fano on 22 August 2013.
