= Cristiano Lucarelli =

Italian footballer (born 1975)

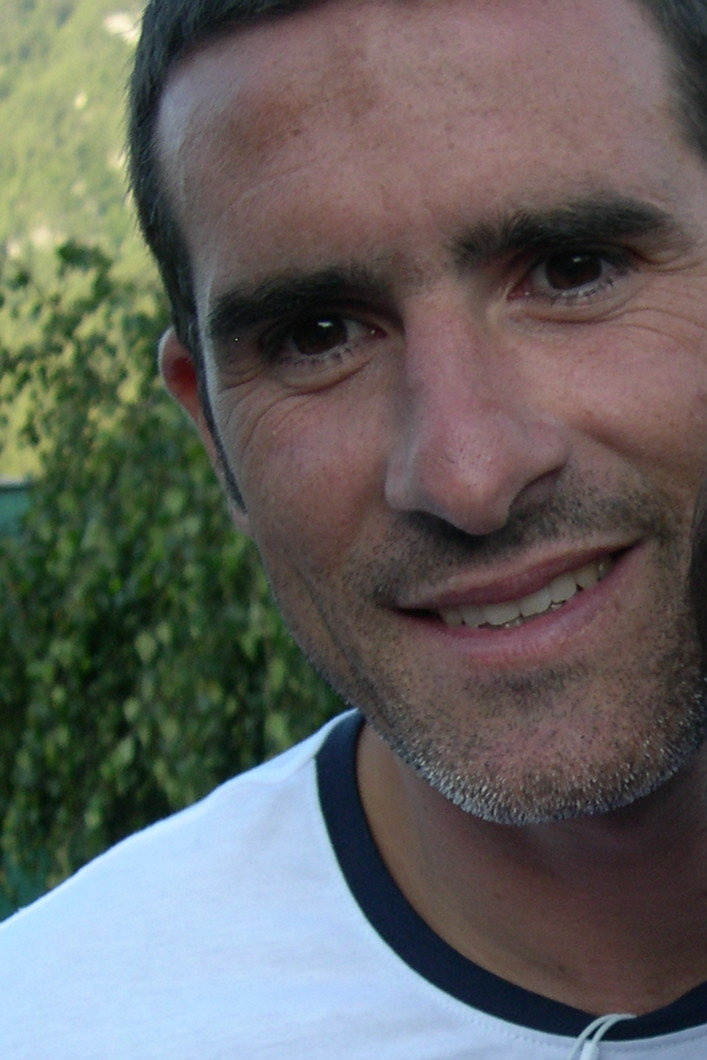
- Lucarelli in 2011

Personal information
- Date of birth: 4 October 1975 (age 51)
- Place of birth: Livorno, Italy
- Height: 1.88 m (6 ft 2 in)
- Position: Forward

Team information
- Current team: Livorno (head coach)

Senior career*
Years	Team	Apps	(Gls)
1992–1993	Cuoiopelli	28	(5)
1993–1995	Perugia	7	(0)
1995–1996	Cosenza	32	(15)
1996–1997	Padova	34	(14)
1997–1998	Atalanta	26	(5)
1998–1999	Valencia	13	(1)
1999–2001	Lecce	59	(27)
2001–2003	Torino	56	(10)
2003–2007	Livorno	146	(92)
2007–2008	Shakhtar Donetsk	12	(4)
2008–2012	Parma	45	(16)
2009–2010	→ Livorno (loan)	28	(10)
2010–2012	→ Napoli (loan)	12	(1)
Total		498	(200)

International career
1996	Italy Olympic	2	(0)
1996–1997	Italy U21	10	(10)
1997	Italy U23	2	(0)
2005–2007	Italy	6	(3)

Managerial career
- 2013: Perugia
- 2013–2014: Viareggio
- 2014–2015: Pistoiese
- 2015–2016: Tuttocuoio
- 2016–2017: Messina
- 2017–2018: Catania
- 2018: Livorno
- 2019–2020: Catania
- 2020–2022: Ternana
- 2023: Ternana
- 2023: Ternana
- 2023–2024: Catania
- 2025–2026: Pistoiese
- 2026–: Livorno
- * Club domestic league appearances and goals

Cristiano Lucarelli (Italian pronunciation: [kriˈstjaːno lukaˈrɛlli]; born 4 October 1975) is an Italian football manager and a former player who played as a forward. He is the head coach of Serie C Group B club Livorno.

== Club career ==
Lucarelli was born in Livorno, Italy.

A journeyman forward, he had stints with eight different teams (including a brief run in Spain with Valencia) before signing with hometown Livorno in 2003. While playing for Torino the previous season, he attended a match that saw Livorno emerge victorious and earn promotion to Serie B, and he was among a throng of fans who rushed the pitch afterwards in celebration. He made an immediate impact in Livorno's return to Serie A in the 2003–04 season, scoring 29 goals in 38 matches and instantly winning a place in the hearts of Amaranto fans. He won the Golden Boot Award as Serie A's top goalscorer the following season, with 24 in 35 matches as Livorno finished in eighth place.

A rarity in the football world in terms of club loyalty, he rejected several better-paying offers from other Italian and European clubs (among them a €3 million offer from Zenit Saint Petersburg in July 2006) to remain with Livorno. He was once quoted as saying, "Some football players pay a billion for a Ferrari or a yacht; with that money, I bought myself Livorno's shirt. That's all."

He scored his 100th Serie A goal as part of a hat-trick in a 4–1 defeat of Catania on 1 April 2007.

Lucarelli's seemingly perfect relationship with the team soured after a conflict with club president Aldo Spinelli arose over the firing of coach Daniele Arrigoni in March 2007, during which he openly stated his desire to leave. It became permanently damaged a month later when Lucarelli received a frosty reception from supporters after a sluggish 1–1 home draw with Reggina, with many fans going as far as to accuse Livorno of match-fixing. Lucarelli, hurt by the fans' criticism, reiterated his plans to leave Livorno at the end of the season.

In May, he was quick to snuff out rumours of a move to Serie A rivals Fiorentina and continued to remain ambiguous about his future with Livorno, claiming that he would decide by 6 June; five days later, Lucarelli announced that he would be staying home for next season due to a lack of offers from other teams, despite fresh rumours about Palermo, Parma and Sampdoria being interested in his services.

However, on 13 July, Lucarelli agreed to join Shakhtar Donetsk for £6 million, signing a three-year contract worth £2.8 million a season, thus becoming the first Italian to play in Ukraine. The news resulted in a flood of negative responses from fans on his official website. He replied to the furore at a press conference, "I am going, but I didn't hold a gun to anyone's head... Shakhtar signed me for a figure that was below the buy-out clause of my contract. That means the club made its considerations and thought that £6m was good for a player going on 32."

Lucarelli scored his first European goal for Shakhtar in their 3–1 third qualifying round return game of the 2007–08 Champions League against Red Bull Salzburg on 29 August 2007.

On 15 January 2008, Lucarelli was sold to Parma for ₤4 million, and he signed a three-and-a-half-year, ₤1.2 million contract. His younger brother, Alessandro, joined him at Parma for the 2008–09 season. His time at Parma did not prove to be particularly successful, as he scored only four goals in 16 matches in the remaining half of the 2007–08 season, with his side being ultimately relegated to Serie B after a long struggle with results. He also opted to stay with Parma for the 2008–09 season, aiming to contribute to bringing the team back into the top flight. During the first part of the season, he initially served as the club's captain and played 19 games, scoring a total of eight goals; however, on 5 February, ahead of the team's away fixture against Ancona, he was ultimately left out of the first team after leaving a training session early. He was subsequently featured intermittently throughout the second half of the season. In total, he only made 29 appearances for the club throughout the season (out of a possible 42), scoring 12 goals.

In July 2009, Lucarelli completed a much-publicised comeback at Livorno on a loan move from Parma; he had already played for Livorno from 2003 to 2007.

In June 2010, after Livorno's relegation to Serie B and the end of his loan, he returned to Parma, who continued in Serie A.

On 21 August 2010, it was announced that he had been loaned to Napoli. After two seasons with the club, he announced his retirement after the end of the 2011–12 season.

== International career ==
Lucarelli was capped six times for the Italy senior squad between 2005 and 2007, scoring 3 goals; he was also a member of the team that took part in the 1996 Summer Olympics. His aforementioned debut was during a 2005 friendly tournament in the United States and Canada, where he scored his first international goal in a 1–1 draw against Serbia and Montenegro at the Rogers Centre in Toronto on 8 June. He was left off the Italy roster for the 2006 FIFA World Cup, but was recalled by new coach Roberto Donadoni – who had briefly coached Lucarelli at Livorno earlier in the year – for a friendly against Croatia on 16 August 2006.

Due to a rash of injuries among the Azzurri, Lucarelli was summoned for a pair of June Euro 2008 qualifiers against Lithuania and the Faroe Islands. He came on as a substitute for Filippo Inzaghi in the 58th minute of Italy's narrow 2–1 victory over the Faroe Islands on 2 June 2007, but did not play in a 2–0 defeat of Lithuania on 6 June. Lucarelli also substituted for Inzaghi in the 65th minute of a Euro 2008 qualifying match against France on 8 September 2007. He scored his first brace in Italy's 2–0 friendly win over South Africa on 17 October.

== Coaching career ==
Lucarelli became a youth coach at Parma for the 2012–13 season. Charge of the club's second most senior youth side (the Allievi Nazionale), composed of players aged between 15 and 17 years. He left Parma in June 2013 to accept an offer to become the new head coach of ambitious Lega Pro Prima Divisione club Perugia, only to be sacked before the start of the season due to disagreements with the board. He then returned into management in October 2013, to become the new head coach of Viareggio, still in Lega Pro Prima Divisione. He then left the club in June 2014 to accept an offer from newly promoted Lega Pro club Pistoiese.

In October 2016, he was named the new head coach of relegation-struggling Lega Pro club Messina. After guiding the club to safety during a period of serious financial struggles followed by a club takeover, Lucarelli and Messina mutually parted company by the end of the season. A few days later, he was announced as new head coach of fellow Sicilian Lega Pro club Catania.

In July 2017, Lucarelli was appointed Catania's new head coach. After one season in charge, he left the club to become the manager of Livorno, but he was sacked on 7 November due to a poor start in the 2018–19 Serie B season.

On 22 October 2019, he was hired by Catania once again. On 29 July 2020, his Catania contract was terminated by mutual consent.

On 8 August 2020, he joined Ternana in Serie C. Under his tenure, Ternana were crowned Girone C champions, winning promotion to Serie B on 3 April 2021 with still four games in hand.

After guiding Ternana to safety in their first season return to Serie B, and despite a positive start to the 2022–23 Serie B season, Lucarelli was dismissed on 26 November 2022 following a negative string of results; he was appointed back at the helm of Ternana on 27 February 2023, following the resignations of Aurelio Andreazzoli. After not being confirmed by the end of the season, Lucarelli was hired for a third time on 14 July 2023, following a change of ownership and the early departure of Aurelio Andreazzoli, who was originally expected to be the new manager for the 2023–24 season. He was however dismissed once again on 6 November 2023 after a negative start to the season. Just a few days later, on 14 November, Lucarelli agreed to return to Serie C club Catania, signing a contract until 30 June 2026 with the Sicilians. He was removed from his coaching post just a few months later, on 7 March 2024, after failing to improve the team results, leaving Catania just above the relegation playoff zone, despite having successfully led the Rossazzurri to qualify for the Coppa Italia Serie C finals.

On 26 December 2025, he joined Pistoiese in Serie D, coming back to the club after 10 years.

On 12 July 2026, Lucarelli was hired by Livorno in Serie C.

== Outside of professional football ==
=== Personal life ===
Cristiano's younger brother, Alessandro, is also a former footballer, who played as a defender in the Serie A league (also sharing a few seasons together with Cristiano while at Livorno), and most notably captaining Parma.

His son Mattia (born 1999), a full-back, followed in his father's footsteps, also playing for Livorno himself during the 2022–23 season.

=== Business ventures ===
On 16 July 2010, Lucarelli became a share-holding partner of Carrarese; he initially owned 50% of the club's shares, along with Gianluigi Buffon and Maurizio Mian.

=== Passion, political views and controversy ===
Lucarelli's passion for his home club often resulted in many questionable incidents. The May 2005 issue of Calcio Italia reported that he had paid for a bus that brought a cadre of travelling Livorno fans back to the city after they had been arrested for rioting. He has the Livorno logo tattooed on his left forearm and his jersey number, 99, was an homage to the left-wing ultras group Brigate Autonome Livornesi, which was founded in 1999.

He was also of an increasingly rare breed of Italian footballer who openly brought his politics onto the pitch; his goal celebration consisted of a dual clenched-fist salute, a gesture made famous by the Communist party. He has openly stated that he is a supporter of communism. One of his mobile phone ringtones was Bandiera Rossa, and he once declared, "We Livorno get no favours from the referees because we are Communists!", but later retracted this statement.

Lucarelli, the supporter who became a Livorno player and icon, even had his mobile phone ring to the tune of The Red Flag.

— The National

He is a staunch admirer of Che Guevara, whose face is frequently displayed on Livorno fans' banners and T-shirts during matches. This first came to the fore in 1997, when, after scoring for Italy's Under-21 side, he celebrated by pulling his shirt over his face to reveal a shirt bearing Che Guevara's image. Despite his insisting that it was not a political gesture, he was consequently blackballed from the national team for several years until Marcello Lippi called him up as a starter for a friendly match in 2005.

Lucarelli met Guevara's daughter, Aleida Guevara, after the 2004–05 Serie A season; one subject of discussion was the possibility of Livorno travelling to Cuba to play a charity match, but it never came to fruition.

== Career statistics ==
=== Club ===
Appearances and goals by club, season and competition
Club	Season	League			Cup		Continental		Total	
Club	Season	Division	Apps	Goals	Apps	Goals	Apps	Goals	Apps	Goals
Cuoiopelli	1992–93	Nazionale Dilettanti	28	5			0	0	28	5
Perugia	1993–94	Serie C1	2	0	0	0	0	0	2	0
Perugia	1994–95	Serie B	5	0	0	0	0	0	5	0
Perugia	Total		7	0	0	0	0	0	7	0
Cosenza	1995–96	Serie B	32	15	0	0	0	0	32	15
Padova	1996–97	Serie B	34	14	1	0	0	0	35	14
Atalanta	1997–98	Serie A	26	5	4	1	0	0	30	6
Valencia	1998–99	La Liga	13	1	0	0	7	2	20	3
Lecce	1999–2000	Serie A	30	15	4	2	0	0	34	17
Lecce	2000–01	Serie A	29	12	4	2	0	0	33	14
Lecce	Total		59	27	8	4	0	0	67	31
Torino	2001–02	Serie A	30	9	0	0	0	0	30	9
Torino	2002–03	Serie A	26	1	2	0	4	1	32	2
Torino	Total		56	10	2	0	4	1	62	11
Livorno	2003–04	Serie B	41	29	1	0	0	0	42	29
Livorno	2004–05	Serie A	35	24	4	1	0	0	39	25
Livorno	2005–06	Serie A	36	19	3	3	0	0	39	22
Livorno	2006–07	Serie A	34	20	1	0	7	5	42	25
Livorno	Total		146	92	9	4	7	5	162	101
Shakhtar Donetsk	2007–08	Premier League	12	4	0	0	9	4	21	8
Parma	2007–08	Serie A	16	4	0	0	0	0	16	4
Parma	2008–09	Serie B	29	12	1	0	0	0	30	12
Parma	Total		45	16	1	0	0	0	46	16
Livorno	2009–10	Serie A	28	10	2	0	0	0	30	10
Napoli	2010–11	Serie A	9	1	1	0	1	0	11	1
Napoli	2011–12	Serie A	3	0	0	0	0	0	3	0
Napoli	Total		12	1	1	0	1	0	14	1
Career total			498	200	28	9	28	12	554	221

=== International ===
Appearances and goals by national team and year
National team	Year	Apps	Goals
Italy	2005	2	1
Italy	2006	1	0
Italy	2007	3	2
Total		6	3

== Managerial statistics ==
As of 18 February 2024

Managerial record by team and tenure
Team	Nat	From	To	Record							
Team	Nat	From	To	G	W	D	L	GF	GA	GD	Win %
Perugia	(Italy)	24 June 2013	24 August 2013	1	0	0	1	0	1	−1	0.00
Viareggio	(Italy)	30 October 2013	12 June 2014	23	6	4	13	20	33	−13	26.09
Pistoiese	(Italy)	12 June 2014	9 February 2015	27	7	9	11	29	44	−15	25.93
Tuttocuoio	(Italy)	18 June 2015	26 April 2016	36	10	10	16	25	39	−14	27.78
Messina	(Italy)	18 October 2016	15 June 2017	32	12	9	11	33	38	−5	37.50
Catania	(Italy)	15 June 2017	4 July 2018	43	25	8	10	80	38	+42	58.14
Livorno	(Italy)	6 July 2018	6 November 2018	12	1	3	8	9	20	−11	8.33
Catania	(Italy)	22 October 2019	29 July 2020	27	12	10	5	29	25	+4	44.44
Ternana	(Italy)	8 August 2020	26 November 2022	95	52	20	23	185	122	+63	54.74
Ternana	(Italy)	27 February 2023	21 June 2023	12	2	3	7	11	19	−8	16.67
Ternana	(Italy)	14 July 2023	6 November 2023	13	1	3	9	10	17	−7	7.69
Catania	(Italy)	14 November 2023	Present	17	6	5	6	21	15	+6	35.29
Career total				338	134	84	120	452	411	+41	39.64

== Honours ==
=== Player ===
Perugia

- Lega Pro Prima Divisione: 1993–94

Valencia

- Copa del Rey: 1998–99
- UEFA Intertoto Cup: 1998

Shakhtar

- Ukrainian Premier League: 2007–08
- Ukrainian Cup: 2007–08

Napoli

- Coppa Italia: 2011–12

Individual

- Serie A top-scorer: 2004–05

=== Managerial ===
Ternana

- Serie C: 2020–21
- Supercoppa di Serie C: 2021
