= 2004–05 Parma FC season =

Parma
2004–05 season
- President: Enrico Bondi
- Manager: Silvio Baldini; Pietro Carmignani
- Stadium: Stadio Ennio Tardini
- Serie A: 17th
- Coppa Italia: Round of 16
- UEFA Cup: Semi-finals
- Top goalscorer: League: Alberto Gilardino (23); All: Alberto Gilardino (25)
- Average home league attendance: 14,044
| Home colours | Away colours |

Parma Football Club only just survived a horror Serie A season for the club, in which the cash-strapped club went from Champions League contenders to relegation strugglers, only surviving thanks to a spareggio victory against Bologna. With lethal striker Alberto Gilardino leaving the club for Milan and goalkeeper Sébastien Frey for Fiorentina, the future looked bleak, especially given that several clubs had accumulated more than 40 points in the 2004–05 season. On a positive note, Parma reached the semi-finals of the UEFA Cup, where it drew 0–0 to CSKA Moscow, before finally losing 3–0 in Russia.

== First-team squad ==
Squad at end of season

Note: Flags indicate national team as defined under FIFA eligibility rules; some limited exceptions apply. Players may hold more than one non-FIFA nationality.

| No. | Pos. | Nation | Player |
|---|---|---|---|
| 2 | DF | ITA | Stefano Bettarini |
| 3 | DF | ITA | Giuseppe Cardone |
| 4 | DF | ITA | Cesare Bovo (on loan from Roma) |
| 5 | DF | ITA | Daniele Bonera |
| 6 | MF | COL | Jorge Bolaño |
| 8 | MF | ITA | Renato Olive |
| 10 | MF | ITA | Domenico Morfeo |
| 11 | FW | ITA | Alberto Gilardino |
| 14 | DF | ITA | Matteo Contini |
| 15 | MF | ITA | Filippo Savi |
| 17 | GK | FRA | Sébastien Frey |
| 18 | FW | ITA | Francesco Ruopolo |
| 19 | FW | ITA | Andrea Pisanu |

| No. | Pos. | Nation | Player |
|---|---|---|---|
| 23 | MF | AUS | Mark Bresciano |
| 24 | FW | ITA | Alex Gibbs |
| 26 | DF | ITA | Damiano Ferronetti |
| 27 | FW | ITA | Tonino Sorrentino |
| 28 | DF | ITA | Paolo Cannavaro |
| 29 | DF | GUI | Ibrahima Camara |
| 30 | MF | BRA | Fábio Simplício |
| 32 | MF | ITA | Marco Marchionni |
| 33 | MF | AUS | Vince Grella |
| 37 | GK | ITA | Luca Bucci |
| 40 | FW | ITA | Fabio Vignaroli (on loan from Modena) |
| — | MF | ITA | Daniele Dessena |
| — | MF | ITA | Davide Furlan |

=== Left club during season ===
Note: Flags indicate national team as defined under FIFA eligibility rules; some limited exceptions apply. Players may hold more than one non-FIFA nationality.

| No. | Pos. | Nation | Player |
|---|---|---|---|
| 1 | GK | ITA | Gianluca Berti (to Torino) |
| 7 | MF | ROU | Ianis Zicu (on loan from Inter Milan) |
| 8 | MF | ITA | Alessandro Budel (on loan from Milan) |
| 9 | FW | ITA | Massimo Maccarone (on loan from Middlesbrough) |

| No. | Pos. | Nation | Player |
|---|---|---|---|
| 13 | FW | ITA | Daniele Degano (to Piacenza) |
| 20 | MF | ITA | Alessandro Rosina (on loan to Verona) |
| 21 | FW | ITA | Gaetano Grieco (to Foggia) |
| 77 | DF | ITA | Alessandro Potenza (on loan from Inter Milan) |

=== Reserve team ===
The following players did not appear for the first team this season.

Note: Flags indicate national team as defined under FIFA eligibility rules; some limited exceptions apply. Players may hold more than one non-FIFA nationality.

| No. | Pos. | Nation | Player |
|---|---|---|---|
| 00 | GK | USA | James Sisouphanh |
| 16 | GK | ITA | Fabio Virgili |
| 22 | GK | ITA | Giordano Vanin |
| 25 | DF | ITA | Alberto Galuppo |
| 31 | GK | ITA | Alfonso De Lucia |
| 34 | MF | ITA | Federico Ranieri |

| No. | Pos. | Nation | Player |
|---|---|---|---|
| 36 | DF | ITA | Marco Rossi |
| 38 | FW | ITA | Niccolò Morsia |
| 39 | MF | ITA | Vincenzo Pepe |
| 41 | MF | ITA | Luka Sikur |
| 45 | MF | ITA | Leonardo Bianchi |

== Results ==
=== Serie A ===
==== League table ====
| Pos | Team | Pld | W | D | L | GF | GA | GD | Pts | Qualification or relegation |
|---|---|---|---|---|---|---|---|---|---|---|
| 15 | Chievo | 38 | 11 | 10 | 17 | 32 | 49 | −17 | 43 | |
| 16 | Fiorentina | 38 | 9 | 15 | 14 | 42 | 50 | −8 | 42 | |
| 17 | Parma | 38 | 10 | 12 | 16 | 48 | 65 | −17 | 42 | Relegation tie-breaker |
| 18 | Bologna (R) | 38 | 9 | 15 | 14 | 33 | 36 | −3 | 42 | Serie B after tie-breaker |
| 19 | Brescia (R) | 38 | 11 | 8 | 19 | 37 | 54 | −17 | 41 | Relegation to Serie B |

Source: 2004–05 Serie A, RSSSF.com, Soccerway
Rules for classification: 1) Points; 2) Head-to-head points; 3) Head-to-head goal difference; 4) Goal difference; 5) Goals scored; 6) Draw. (Note: Head-to-head record is used only after all the matches between the teams in question have been played).
(R) Relegated

==== Results summary ====
| Overall | | | | | | | | Home | | | | | | Away | | | | | |
| Pld | W | D | L | GF | GA | GD | Pts | W | D | L | GF | GA | GD | W | D | L | GF | GA | GD |
|---|---|---|---|---|---|---|---|---|---|---|---|---|---|---|---|---|---|---|---|
| 38 | 10 | 12 | 16 | 48 | 65 | −17 | 42 | 8 | 9 | 2 | 33 | 25 | +8 | 2 | 3 | 14 | 15 | 40 | −25 |

Last updated: 29 May 2005.
Source: Competitive matches

==== Results by round ====
| Round | 1 | 2 | 3 | 4 | 5 | 6 | 7 | 8 | 9 | 10 | 11 | 12 | 13 | 14 | 15 | 16 | 17 | 18 | 19 | 20 | 21 | 22 | 23 | 24 | 25 | 26 | 27 | 28 | 29 | 30 | 31 | 32 | 33 | 34 | 35 | 36 | 37 | 38 |
|---|---|---|---|---|---|---|---|---|---|---|---|---|---|---|---|---|---|---|---|---|---|---|---|---|---|---|---|---|---|---|---|---|---|---|---|---|---|---|
| Ground | H | A | H | A | H | A | H | A | H | A | H | H | A | H | A | A | H | A | H | A | H | A | H | A | H | A | H | A | H | A | A | H | A | H | H | A | H | A |
| Result | D | L | L | D | D | L | W | L | D | D | W | D | L | L | L | L | D | W | W | L | W | L | D | L | W | L | W | L | D | W | L | D | L | W | W | L | D | D |
| Position | 13 | 17 | 18 | 20 | 18 | 19 | 17 | 19 | 19 | 19 | 17 | 18 | 18 | 18 | 18 | 19 | 19 | 18 | 18 | 17 | 17 | 17 | 17 | 18 | 17 | 17 | 16 | 16 | 17 | 15 | 17 | 16 | 19 | 15 | 15 | 15 | 17 | 17 |

Updated to match(es) played on 29 May 2005. Source: Competitive matches
A = Away; H = Home; W = Win; D = Draw; L = Loss; = Leader, UEFA Champions League Groups stage; = UEFA Champions League Groups stage; = UEFA Champions League Qualifying round; = 2005–06 UEFA Cup; = 2005–06 Serie B

==== Matches ====
| 12 September 2004 1 | Parma | 0–0 | Messina | Parma |
| 15:00 CEST (UTC+02:00) | Marchionni (yellow card) 25' | Report | Coppola (yellow card) 87' | Stadium: Stadio Ennio Tardini; Attendance: 11,415; Referee: Nicola Rizzoli |

| 19 September 2004 2 | Udinese | 4–0 | Parma | Udine |
| 20:30 CEST (UTC+02:00) | Di Natale 15'; Cribari (yellow card) 17'; Jankulovski (yellow card) 59', (goal) 74' (pen.); Di Michele 76'; Fava 90+2' | Report | Bonera (yellow card) 19' (yellow-red card) 30'; Zicu (yellow card) 67' | Stadium: Stadio Friuli; Attendance: 13,624; Referee: Emidio Morganti |

| 22 September 2004 3 | Parma | 1–2 | Bologna | Parma |
| 20:30 CEST (UTC+02:00) | Camara (yellow card) 19'; Cannavaro 58'; Ferronetti (yellow card) 68' | Report | Locatelli 13'; Petruzzi 20'; Sussi (yellow card) 35'; Loviso (yellow card) 52' | Stadium: Stadio Ennio Tardini; Attendance: 11,627; Referee: Pasquale Rodomonti |

| 26 September 2004 4 | Internazionale | 2–2 | Parma | Milan |
| 15:00 CEST (UTC+02:00) | Córdoba (yellow card) 36'; Martins 72', 82' | Report | Gilardino 17'; Simplício (yellow card) 32'; Marchionni 74'; Morfeo (yellow card) 90' | Stadium: San Siro; Attendance: 55,303; Referee: Emidio Morganti |

| 3 October 2004 5 | Parma | 0–0 | Fiorentina | Parma |
| 15:00 CEST (UTC+02:00) | Simplício (yellow card) 24'; Contini (yellow card) 67'; Bolaño (yellow card) 80' | Report | Ariatti (yellow card) 25'; Fontana (yellow card) 77' (yellow-red card) 78' | Stadium: Stadio Ennio Tardini; Attendance: 13,653; Referee: Daniele Tombolini |

| 17 October 2004 6 | Brescia | 3–1 | Parma | Brescia |
| 15:00 CEST (UTC+02:00) | Di Biagio 25'; Caracciolo 28'; Mannini 47' | Report | Gilardino 11' | Stadium: Stadio Mario Rigamonti; Attendance: 6,902; Referee: Pierluigi Collina |

| 23 October 2004 7 | Parma | 3–1 | Lazio | Parma |
| 15:00 CEST (UTC+02:00) | Marchionni 16'; Potenza (yellow card) 17'; Bresciano 27'; Gilardino 64'; Bolaño (yellow card) 80' | Report | Rocchi 37'; Couto (yellow card) 81' | Stadium: Stadio Ennio Tardini; Attendance: 11,521; Referee: Domenico Messina |

| 26 October 2004 8 | Cagliari | 2–1 | Parma | Cagliari |
| CEST (UTC+02:00) | Abeijón 45+1'; Esposito 85' | | Marchionni 63' | Stadium: Stadio Sant'Elia |

| 30 October 2004 9 | Parma | 2–2 | Atalanta | Parma |
| CEST (UTC+02:00) | Gilardino 40', 55' | | Budan 45'; Montolivo 76' | Stadium: Stadio Ennio Tardini |

| 6 November 2004 10 | Palermo | 1–1 | Parma | Palermo |
| | González 37' | | Gilardino 37' | Stadium: Stadio Renzo Barbera |

| 9 November 2004 11 | Parma | 1–0 | Reggina | Parma |
| | Morfeo 79' | | | Stadium: Stadio Ennio Tardini |

| 13 November 2004 12 | Parma | 2–2 | Chievo | Parma |
| | Amauri 55' (o.g.); Morfeo 78' | | Amauri 63'; César 69' | Stadium: Stadio Ennio Tardini |

| 27 November 2004 13 | Sampdoria | 1–0 | Parma | Genoa |
| | Flachi 90+4' (pen.) | | | Stadium: Stadio Luigi Ferraris |

| 3 December 2004 14 | Parma | 1–2 | Milan | Parma |
| | Gilardino 68' | | Kaká 82'; Pirlo 90' | Stadium: Stadio Ennio Tardini |

| 11 December 2004 15 | Livorno | 2–0 | Parma | Livorno |
| | Lucarelli 39', 88' | | | Stadium: Stadio Armando Picchi |

| 18 December 2004 16 | Roma | 5–1 | Parma | Rome |
| | Cassano 9', 49'; Totti 28', 57'; Montella 52' | | Bovo 44' | Stadium: Stadio Olimpico |

| 5 January 2005 17 | Parma | 1–1 | Juventus | Parma |
| | Marchionni 85' | | Ibrahimović 64' | Stadium: Stadio Ennio Tardini |

| 8 January 2005 18 | Siena | 0–1 | Parma | Siena |
| | | | Gilardino 21' | Stadium: Stadio Artemio Franchi – Montepaschi Arena |

| 15 January 2005 19 | Parma | 2–1 | Lecce | Parma |
| | Bresciano 53'; Gilardino 90+6' | | Vučinić 82' | Stadium: Stadio Ennio Tardini |

| 22 January 2005 20 | Messina | 1–0 | Parma | Messina |
| | Di Napoli 80' | | | Stadium: Stadio San Filippo |

| 28 January 2005 21 | Parma | 1–0 | Udinese | Parma |
| | Gilardino 35' | | | Stadium: Stadio Ennio Tardini |

| 2 February 2005 22 | Bologna | 3–1 | Parma | Bologna |
| | Sussi 54'; Amoroso 72'; Bellucci 90+2' | | Sorrentino 87' | Stadium: Stadio Renato Dall'Ara |

| 5 February 2005 23 | Parma | 2–2 | Internazionale | Parma |
| | Fábio Simplício 35' (pen.); Gilardino 60' | | Córdoba 76'; Vieri 80' (pen.) | Stadium: Stadio Ennio Tardini |

| 12 February 2005 24 | Fiorentina | 2–1 | Parma | Florence |
| | Chiellini 47'; Miccoli 81' | | Gilardino 84' | Stadium: Stadio Artemio Franchi |

| 19 February 2005 25 | Parma | 2–1 | Brescia | Parma |
| | Gilardino 23' (pen.); Morfeo 50' | | Di Biagio 52' (pen.) | Stadium: Stadio Ennio Tardini |

| 26 February 2005 26 | Lazio | 2–0 | Parma | Rome |
| | Oddo 19'; Filippini 89' | | | Stadium: Stadio Olimpico |

| 5 March 2005 27 | Parma | 3–2 | Cagliari | Parma |
| | Gilardino 10'; Bovo 17'; Fábio Simplício 90+3' | | Bonera 4' (o.g.); Suazo 89' | Stadium: Stadio Ennio Tardini |

| 12 March 2005 28 | Atalanta | 1–0 | Parma | Bergamo |
| | Adriano Pereira 79' | | | Stadium: Stadio Atleti Azzurri d'Italia |

| 19 March 2005 29 | Parma | 3–3 | Palermo | Parma |
| | Morfeo 20'; Gilardino 50' (pen.), 90+2' | | Contini 13' (o.g.); Toni 39' (pen.); Brienza 47' | Stadium: Stadio Ennio Tardini |

| 9 April 2005 30 | Reggina | 1–3 | Parma | Reggio Calabria |
| | Mozart 53' (pen.) | | Morfeo 21', 45+4'; Fábio Simplício 58' | Stadium: Stadio Oreste Granillo |

| 16 April 2005 31 | Chievo | 2–0 | Parma | Verona |
| | Marchesetti 66'; Cossato 77' | | | Stadium: Stadio Marc'Antonio Bentegodi |

| 19 April 2005 32 | Parma | 1–1 | Sampdoria | Parma |
| | Gilardino 39' | | Gasbarroni 35' | Stadium: Stadio Ennio Tardini |

| 22 April 2005 33 | Milan | 3–0 | Parma | Milan |
| | Kaká 33'; Tomasson 62'; Cafu 71' | | | Stadium: San Siro |

| 30 April 2005 34 | Parma | 6–4 | Livorno | Parma |
| | Gilardino 3', 37', 72', 85'; Pisanu 27'; Fábio Simplício 47' | | Lucarelli 22', 24', 58' (pen.), 73' | Stadium: Stadio Ennio Tardini |

| 7 May 2005 35 | Parma | 2–1 | Roma | Parma |
| | Morfeo 63'; Gilardino 79' (pen.) | | Cassano 4' | Stadium: Stadio Ennio Tardini |

| 14 May 2005 36 | Juventus | 2–0 | Parma | Turin |
| | Del Piero 6'; Ibrahimović 23' | | | Stadium: Stadio delle Alpi |

| 21 May 2005 37 | Parma | 0–0 | Siena | Parma |
| | | | | Stadium: Stadio Ennio Tardini |

| 28 May 2005 38 | Lecce | 3–3 | Parma | Lecce |
| | Pinardi 29'; Vučinić 40'; Dalla Bona 46' | | Morfeo 22'; Bresciano 43'; Gilardino 55' | Stadium: Stadio Via del Mare |

=== Relegation play-offs ===
| 14 June 2005 First leg | Parma | 0–1 | Bologna | Parma |
| | | | Tare 18' | Stadium: Stadio Ennio Tardini |

| 18 June 2005 Second leg | Bologna | 0–2 (1–2 agg.) | Parma | Bologna |
| | | | Cardone 17'; Gilardino 45+2' | Stadium: Stadio Renato Dall'Ara |

=== Coppa Italia ===
==== Round of 16 ====
| 20 November 2004 First leg | Parma | 0–2 | Fiorentina | Parma |
| | | [ Report] | Portillo 27'; Valdes 79' | Stadium: Stadio Ennio Tardini |

| 12 January 2005 Second leg | Fiorentina | 3–0 (5–0 agg.) | Parma | Florence |
| | Fantini 54'; Maresca 70'; Maggio 80' | [ Report] | | Stadium: Stadio Artemio Franchi |

=== UEFA Cup ===
==== First round ====
| 16 September 2004 First leg | Parma (Italy) | 3–2 | (Slovenia) Maribor | Parma, Italy |
| 21:00 CEST (UTC+02:00) | Maccarone 4', 22'; Marchionni 65'; Potenza (yellow card) 80' | Report | Kvas 14' (pen.); Golob 89' | Stadium: Stadio Ennio Tardini; Referee: Stefan Messner (Austria) |

| 30 September 2004 Second leg | Maribor (Slovenia) | 0–0 | (Italy) Parma | Maribor, Slovenia |
| 20:15 CEST (UTC+02:00) | Ošlaj (yellow card) 72' | Report | Maccarone (yellow card) 39'; Bolaño (yellow card) 53' | Stadium: Ljudski vrt Referee: Franz-Xaver Wack (Germany) |

==== Group stage ====
Group B
| Team | Pts | Pld | W | D | L | GF | GA | GD |
|---|---|---|---|---|---|---|---|---|
| (Spain) Athletic Bilbao | 9 | 4 | 3 | 0 | 1 | 11 | 4 | +7 |
| (Romania) Steaua București | 6 | 4 | 2 | 0 | 2 | 4 | 3 | +1 |
| (Italy) Parma | 6 | 4 | 2 | 0 | 2 | 5 | 6 | -1 |
| (Turkey) Beşiktaş | 4 | 4 | 1 | 1 | 2 | 7 | 7 | 0 |
| (Belgium) Standard Liège | 4 | 4 | 1 | 1 | 2 | 4 | 11 | -7 |

| 21 October 2004 1 | Athletic Bilbao (Spain) | 2–0 | (Italy) Parma | Bilbao, Spain |
| 21:00 CEST (UTC+02:00) | Gurpegi 6'; Del Horno 49'; Guerrero (yellow card) 78' | Report | Grieco (yellow card) 27'; Rosina (yellow card) 48'; Ruopolo (yellow card) 67'; Morfeo (yellow card) 71' | Stadium: San Mamés; Attendance: 24,000; Referee: Zsolt Szabó (Hungary) |

| 4 November 2004 2 | Parma (Italy) | 1–0 | (Romania) Steaua București | Parma, Italy |
| 19:00 CET (UTC+01:00) | Budel 80'; Grella (yellow card) 88' | Report | | Stadium: Stadio Ennio Tardini; Attendance: 3,949; Referee: Ruud Bossen (Netherlands) |

| 25 November 2004 3 | Standard Liège (Belgium) | 2–1 | (Italy) Parma | Liège, Belgium |
| 19:30 CET (UTC+01:00) | Onyewu (yellow card) 10'; Geraerts 54'; Curbelo (yellow card) 73'; Léonard (yellow card) 76'; Michel 90+4' | Report | Budel (yellow card) 26'; Ferronetti (yellow card) 43'; Pisanu 44'; Grella (yellow card) 71'; Marchionni (yellow card) 76'; Contini (yellow card) 80' | Stadium: Stade Maurice Dufrasne; Attendance: 23,000; Referee: Mark Halsey (England) |

| 16 December 2004 4 | Parma (Italy) | 3–2 | (Turkey) Beşiktaş | Parma, Italy |
| 20:45 CET (UTC+01:00) | Bolaño (yellow card) 15'; Gilardino 17'; Cardone 36'; Pisanu (yellow card) 47'; Degano 60', (yellow card) 60'; Simplício (yellow card) 82'; Berti (yellow card) 89' | Report | Okan 6'; Doğan (yellow card) 86'; Tümer 89' | Stadium: Stadio Ennio Tardini; Attendance: 3,155; Referee: Laurent Duhamel (France) |

==== Final phase ====
===== Round of 32 =====
| 16 February 2005 First leg | Parma (Italy) | 0–0 | (Germany) Stuttgart | Parma, Italy |
| 20:30 CET (UTC+01:00) | Bettarini (yellow card) 35'; Grella (yellow card) 55'; Sorrentino (yellow card) 70' | Report | Meißner (yellow card) 42' | Stadium: Stadio Ennio Tardini; Referee: Paul Allaerts (Belgium) |

| 24 February 2005 Second leg | Stuttgart (Germany) | 0–2 (a.e.t.) (0–2 agg.) | (Italy) Parma | Stuttgart, Germany |
| 20:30 CET (UTC+01:00) | Soldo (yellow card) 64'; Babbel (yellow card) 86' | Report | Pisanu (yellow card) 24', (goal) 116'; Dessena (yellow card) 32'; Bolaño (yellow card) 41'; Bresciano (yellow card) 84'; Marchionni 100' | Stadium: Gottlieb-Daimler-Stadion; Referee: Kenny Clark (Scotland) |

===== Round of 16 =====
| 10 March 2005 First leg | Sevilla (Spain) | 0–0 | (Italy) Parma | Seville, Spain |
| 21:30 CET (UTC+01:00) | Makukula (yellow card) 72'; Navarro (yellow card) 82'; Silva (yellow card) 85' | Report | Bovo (yellow card) 12'; Vignaroli (yellow card) 25'; Dessena (yellow card) 28'; Cardone (yellow card) 35'; Marchionni (yellow card) 51'; Grella (yellow card) 57'; Bonera (yellow card) 59'; Contini (yellow card) 70' | Stadium: Ramón Sánchez Pizjuán; Referee: René Temmink (Netherlands) |

| 17 March 2005 Second leg | Parma (Italy) | 1–0 (1–0 agg.) | (Spain) Sevilla | Parma, Italy |
| 20:45 CET (UTC+01:00) | Cardone 19'; Gibbs (yellow card) 22'; Grella (yellow card) 39'; Bonera (yellow card) 41'; Contini (yellow card) 70' | Report | Ramos (yellow card) 44' | Stadium: Stadio Ennio Tardini; Referee: Claus Bo Larsen (Denmark) |

===== Quarter-finals =====
| 7 April 2005 First leg | Austria Wien | 1–1 | (Italy) Parma | Vienna, Austria |
| 20:45 CEST (UTC+02:00) | Mila 61'; Vastić (yellow card) 74' | Report | Bolaño (yellow card) 30'; Pisanu 34'; Vignaroli (yellow card) 37'; Dessena (yellow card) 54'; Gibbs (yellow card) 67' | Stadium: Ernst-Happel-Stadion; Referee: Éric Poulat (France) |

| 14 April 2005 Second leg | Parma (Italy) | 0–0 (1a–1 agg.) | Austria Wien | Parma, Italy |
| 20:45 CEST (UTC+02:00) | Simplício (yellow card) 33'; Cardone (yellow card) 44'; Morfeo (yellow card) 73'; Bresciano (yellow card) 83'; Contini (yellow card) 90+3' | Report | Papac (yellow card) 72'; Afolabi (yellow card) 87' | Stadium: Stadio Ennio Tardini; Referee: Stephen Bennett (England) |

===== Semi-finals =====
| 28 April 2005 First leg | Parma (Italy) | 0–0 | (Russia) CSKA Moscow | Parma, Italy |
| 21:00 CEST (UTC+02:00) | Bovo (yellow card) 54'; Vignaroli (yellow card) 75' | Report | | Stadium: Stadio Ennio Tardini; Referee: Massimo Busacca (Switzerland) |

| 5 May 2005 Second leg | CSKA Moscow (Russia) | 3–0 (3–0 agg.) | (Italy) Parma | Moscow, Russia |
| 18:45 CEST (UTC+02:00) | Carvalho 10', 53'; Aldonin (yellow card) 51'; V. Berezutski 60'; Vágner Love (yellow card) 67' | Report | Camara (yellow card) 35'; Bresciano (yellow card) 69'; Bovo (yellow card) 76'; Bonera (yellow card) 90' (yellow-red card) | Stadium: Lokomotiv Stadium; Referee: Alain Hamer (Luxembourg) |

== Statistics ==
=== Appearances and goals ===
| No. | Pos | Nat | Player | Total | | Serie A | | Coppa Italia | | UEFA Cup | |
| No. | Pos | Nat | Player | Apps | Goals | Apps | Goals | Apps | Goals | Apps | Goals |
Goalkeepers
| 1 | GK | (Italy) ITA | Gianluca Berti | 9 | 0 | 1 | 0 | 2 | 0 | 6 | 0 |
| 17 | GK | (France) FRA | Sébastien Frey | 41 | 0 | 38 | 0 | 0 | 0 | 1+2 | 0 |
| 37 | GK | (Italy) ITA | Luca Bucci | 9 | 0 | 1+1 | 0 | 0 | 0 | 7 | 0 |
Defenders
| 2 | DF | (Italy) ITA | Stefano Bettarini | 4 | 0 | 2 | 0 | 0 | 0 | 2 | 0 |
| 3 | DF | (Italy) ITA | Giuseppe Cardone | 25 | 3 | 15+2 | 1 | 1 | 0 | 6+1 | 2 |
| 4 | DF | (Italy) ITA | Cesare Bovo | 42 | 2 | 31+2 | 2 | 1 | 0 | 7+1 | 0 |
| 5 | DF | (Italy) ITA | Daniele Bonera | 47 | 0 | 36 | 0 | 1 | 0 | 8+2 | 0 |
| 14 | DF | (Italy) ITA | Matteo Contini | 41 | 0 | 27+3 | 0 | 0+1 | 0 | 9+1 | 0 |
| 26 | DF | (Italy) ITA | Damiano Ferronetti | 15 | 0 | 5+5 | 0 | 1 | 0 | 4 | 0 |
| 28 | DF | (Italy) ITA | Paolo Cannavaro | 43 | 1 | 24+6 | 1 | 1 | 0 | 12 | 0 |
| 29 | DF | (Guinea) GUI | Ibrahima Camara | 19 | 0 | 3+8 | 0 | 1 | 0 | 7 | 0 |
| 77 | DF | (Italy) ITA | Alessandro Potenza | 21 | 0 | 12+4 | 0 | 2 | 0 | 2+1 | 0 |
Midfielders
| 6 | MF | (Colombia) COL | Jorge Bolaño | 31 | 0 | 19+3 | 0 | 0 | 0 | 7+2 | 0 |
| 7 | MF | (Romania) ROU | Ianis Zicu | 4 | 0 | 1+1 | 0 | 0+1 | 0 | 1 | 0 |
| 8 | MF | (Italy) ITA | Alessandro Budel | 18 | 1 | 6+4 | 0 | 2 | 0 | 4+2 | 1 |
| 8 | MF | (Italy) ITA | Renato Olive | 9 | 0 | 4+5 | 0 | 0 | 0 | 0 | 0 |
| 10 | MF | (Italy) ITA | Domenico Morfeo | 36 | 8 | 27+5 | 8 | 0 | 0 | 0+4 | 0 |
| 15 | MF | (Italy) ITA | Filippo Savi | 6 | 0 | 2+1 | 0 | 0 | 0 | 3 | 0 |
| 19 | MF | (Italy) ITA | Andrea Pisanu | 30 | 4 | 15+3 | 1 | 2 | 0 | 8+2 | 3 |
| 20 | MF | (Italy) ITA | Alessandro Rosina | 19 | 0 | 6+6 | 0 | 2 | 0 | 5 | 0 |
| 23 | MF | (Australia) AUS | Mark Bresciano | 46 | 3 | 33+3 | 3 | 1 | 0 | 4+5 | 0 |
| 30 | MF | (Brazil) BRA | Fábio Simplício | 46 | 4 | 33+3 | 4 | 0+1 | 0 | 4+5 | 0 |
| 32 | MF | (Italy) ITA | Marco Marchionni | 32 | 6 | 22+2 | 4 | 0+1 | 0 | 2+5 | 2 |
| 33 | MF | (Australia) AUS | Vince Grella | 35 | 0 | 19+6 | 0 | 1 | 0 | 8+1 | 0 |
| | MF | (Italy) ITA | Daniele Dessena | 11 | 0 | 2+2 | 0 | 1 | 0 | 6 | 0 |
| | MF | (Italy) ITA | Davide Furlan | 2 | 0 | 0 | 0 | 0 | 0 | 2 | 0 |
Forwards
| 9 | FW | (Italy) ITA | Massimo Maccarone | 12 | 2 | 4+3 | 0 | 0+1 | 0 | 4 | 2 |
| 11 | FW | (Italy) ITA | Alberto Gilardino | 48 | 25 | 38+1 | 24 | 1 | 0 | 3+5 | 1 |
| 13 | FW | (Italy) ITA | Daniele Degano | 4 | 1 | 1+1 | 0 | 0+1 | 0 | 1 | 1 |
| 18 | FW | (Italy) ITA | Francesco Ruopolo | 21 | 0 | 1+10 | 0 | 1 | 0 | 7+2 | 0 |
| 21 | FW | (Italy) ITA | Gaetano Grieco | 4 | 0 | 0 | 0 | 1 | 0 | 2+1 | 0 |
| 24 | FW | (Italy) ITA | Alex Gibbs | 3 | 0 | 0 | 0 | 0 | 0 | 3 | 0 |
| 27 | FW | (Italy) ITA | Tonino Sorrentino | 8 | 1 | 0+5 | 1 | 0 | 0 | 2+1 | 0 |
| 40 | FW | (Italy) ITA | Fabio Vignaroli | 22 | 0 | 6+10 | 0 | 0 | 0 | 6 | 0 |

Last updated: 31 June 2005
Source: Matches

=== Goalscorers ===
| Place | Position | Nation | Number | Name | Serie A | Playoff | Coppa Italia | UEFA Cup | Total |
|---|---|---|---|---|---|---|---|---|---|
| 1 | FW | (Italy) | | Alberto Gilardino | 23 | 1 | 0 | 1 | 25 |
| 2 | MF | (Italy) | | Domenico Morfeo | 8 | 0 | 0 | 0 | 8 |
| 3 | MF | (Italy) | | Marco Marchionni | 4 | 0 | 0 | 2 | 6 |
| 4 | MF | (Brazil) | | Fábio Simplício | 4 | 0 | 0 | 0 | 4 |
| 4 | FW | (Italy) | | Andrea Pisanu | 1 | 0 | 0 | 3 | 4 |
| 6 | MF | (Australia) | | Mark Bresciano | 3 | 0 | 0 | 0 | 3 |
| 6 | DF | (Italy) | | Giuseppe Cardone | 0 | 1 | 0 | 2 | 3 |
| 8 | DF | (Italy) | | Cesare Bovo | 2 | 0 | 0 | 0 | 2 |
| 8 | FW | (Italy) | | Massimo Maccarone | 0 | 0 | 0 | 2 | 2 |
| 10 | DF | (Italy) | | Paolo Cannavaro | 1 | 0 | 0 | 0 | 1 |
| 10 | | | | Own goal | 1 | 0 | 0 | 0 | 1 |
| 10 | FW | (Italy) | | Tonino Sorrentino | 1 | 0 | 0 | 0 | 1 |
| 10 | MF | (Italy) | | Alessandro Budel | 0 | 0 | 0 | 1 | 1 |
| 10 | FW | (Italy) | | Daniele Degano | 0 | 0 | 0 | 1 | 1 |
| | | | | TOTALS | 48 | 2 | 0 | 12 | 62 |
