= 2003–04 Parma AC season =

Parma
2003–04 season
- Owner: Parmalat
- President: Stefano Tanzi
- Manager: Cesare Prandelli
- Stadium: Stadio Ennio Tardini
- Serie A: 5th
- Coppa Italia: Quarter-finals
- UEFA Cup: Third round
- Top goalscorer: League: Alberto Gilardino (23); All: Alberto Gilardino (26)
- Average home league attendance: 15,904
Home colours	Away colours

During the 2003–04 season Parma Associazione Calcio competed in Serie A, Coppa Italia and UEFA Cup.

== Summary ==
The team endured a season of horror, in which the club formerly known as Parma A.C. went into bankruptcy in the middle of the season, seeing out the season in order to avoid the chaos it would cause to the league pyramid. The reason for the bankruptcy was the financial fraud of its owner Calisto Tanzi, who had embezzled money from his company Parmalat, which also went out of business. On 28 June 2004 the club was reformed under its original name as Parma F.C., and finished fifth in the standings. Its glory days were over, however, and the club was forced to sell several key players in the summer of 2004, among them Hidetoshi Nakata, Matteo Ferrari and Matteo Brighi. However, its two most noted players, goalkeeper Sébastien Frey and top scorer and youngster Alberto Gilardino remained with the club, since it did not receive good enough offers to part with the two players.

The season was also the last in which Parma wore its distinctive blue and yellow colours at home, those being associated with Parmalat's ownership. From the 2004–05 season onwards the club reverted to its original white shirt with a black cross design. Club legend Antonio Benarrivo finished his career following the season, being the last player from the 1999 UEFA Cup winning team to leave.

== Players ==
=== Squad information ===
Squad at end of season

Note: Flags indicate national team as defined under FIFA eligibility rules; some limited exceptions apply. Players may hold more than one non-FIFA nationality.

No.	Pos.	Nation	Player
1	GK	FRA	Sébastien Frey
2	DF	ITA	Sebastiano Girelli
3	DF	ITA	Antonio Benarrivo
4	DF	CRO	Anthony Šerić (on loan from Hellas Verona)
5	DF	ITA	Daniele Bonera
6	DF	ITA	Giuseppe Cardone
7	MF	ROU	Ianis Zicu (on loan from Dinamo București)
8	MF	ITA	Simone Barone
10	MF	ITA	Domenico Morfeo
11	FW	ITA	Alberto Gilardino
13	DF	ARG	Gabriel Oyola
14	DF	ITA	Marcello Castellini
15	MF	ITA	Marco Donadel
16	DF	ITA	Mirko Stefani
18	FW	ITA	Benito Carbone
19	DF	ITA	Alessandro Potenza (on loan from Internazionale)

No.	Pos.	Nation	Player
20	MF	ITA	Alessandro Rosina
21	DF	ITA	Matteo Ferrari
22	GK	ITA	Giordano Vanin
23	MF	AUS	Mark Bresciano
24	GK	ITA	Fabio Virgili
25	FW	ITA	Alex Gibbs
26	MF	GUI	Ibrahima Camara
28	DF	ITA	Paolo Cannavaro
30	MF	ITA	Manuele Blasi (on loan from Juventus)
31	MF	ITA	Paolo Ruffini
32	MF	ITA	Marco Marchionni
33	MF	ITA	Lorenzo Carotti
34	GK	ITA	Marco Amelia (on loan from Lecce)
36	MF	ITA	Manuele Sorti
37	FW	ITA	Daniele Degano (on loan from Ancona)
38	FW	ITA	Fabrizio Cammarata (on loan from Cagliari)

=== Transfers ===
In
Pos.	Name	from	Type
MF	Domenico Morfeo	Internazionale	
MF	Benito Carbone	Como Calcio	
DF	Marcello Castellini	Bologna F.C.	
MF	Marco Donadel	U.S. Lecce	
DF	Anthony Seric	Brescia Calcio	
MF	Manuele Blasi	Perugia Calcio	loan ended
MF	Stephen Appiah	Brescia Calcio	loan ended
DF	Mirko Stefani	A.C. Milan	
DF	Emiliano Moretti	Juventus	

Out
Pos.	Name	To	Type
FW	Adrian Mutu	Chelsea F.C.	
MF	Stephen Appiah	Juventus	
MF	Matteo Brighi	Brescia Calcio	loan
MF	Sabri Lamouchi	Internazionale	
DF	Vratislav Gresko	Blackburn Rovers	
DF	Alessandro Pierini	Udinese Calcio	
GK	Claudio Taffarel		retired

==== Winter ====
In
Pos.	Name	from	Type
DF	Alessandro Potenza	Ancona Calcio	
FW	Fabrizio Cammarata	Cagliari Calcio	
FW	Ianis Zicu	Internazionale	loan
FW	Daniele Degano	Ancona Calcio	
GK	Marco Amelia	U.S. Lecce	
DF	Ibrahima Camara		

Out
Pos.	Name	To	Type
FW	Adriano	Internazionale	
MF	Emanuele Filippini	Palermo	
FW	Gaetano Grieco	Genoa	
FW	Tonino Sorrentino	Avellino	
MF	Jorge Bolaño	Lecce	
MF	Hidetoshi Nakata	Bologna F.C.	loan
DF	Júnior	A.C. Siena	loan
MF	Emiliano Moretti	Bologna F.C.	loan
GK	Alfonso De Lucia	Salernitana	loan
GK	Vincenzo Sicignano	Lecce	loan
FW	Isah Eliakwu	Internazionale	loan

== Competitions ==
=== Serie A ===
==== League table ====
Pos	Team	Pld	W	D	L	GF	GA	GD	Pts	Qualification or relegation
3	Juventus	34	21	6	7	67	42	+25	69	Qualification to Champions League third qualifying round
4	Internazionale	34	17	8	9	59	37	+22	59	Qualification to Champions League third qualifying round
5	Parma	34	16	10	8	57	46	+11	58	Qualification to UEFA Cup first round
6	Lazio	34	16	8	10	52	38	+14	56	Qualification to UEFA Cup first round
7	Udinese (Note: Udinese gained entry to the 2004–05 UEFA Cup as Coppa Italia because both finalists Lazio and Juventus qualified for the 2004–05 UEFA Cup and the 2004–05 UEFA Champions League through league position, respectively.)	34	13	11	10	44	40	+4	50	Qualification to UEFA Cup first round

Source: Almanacco Illustrato del Calcio – La Storia 1898-2004, Panini Edizioni, Modena, September 2005
Rules for classification: 1) points; 2) tiebreaker for relevant positions 3) head-to-head points and goal difference; 4) head-to-head goals scored; 5) goal difference; 6) number of goals scored.

==== Results summary ====
Overall								Home						Away					
Pld	W	D	L	GF	GA	GD	Pts	W	D	L	GF	GA	GD	W	D	L	GF	GA	GD
34	16	10	8	57	46	+11	58	9	5	3	32	20	+12	7	5	5	25	26	−1

Last updated: 16 May 2004.
Source: Competitive matches

==== Results by round ====
Round	1	2	3	4	5	6	7	8	9	10	11	12	13	14	15	16	17	18	19	20	21	22	23	24	25	26	27	28	29	30	31	32	33	34
Ground	A	H	A	H	H	A	H	A	H	A	H	A	A	H	A	H	A	H	A	H	A	A	H	A	H	A	H	A	H	H	A	H	A	H
Result	D	W	W	D	W	L	W	W	D	L	W	W	L	L	W	W	D	D	D	L	W	W	L	D	D	L	W	W	W	D	D	W	L	W
Position	6	6	1	4	3	4	4	4	4	6	5	5	6	6	6	5	4	4	5	6	5	5	5	4	4	4	4	4	4	5	5	4	5	5

Source: Competitive matches
A = Away; H = Home; W = Win; D = Draw; L = Loss; = Leader, UEFA Champions League Groups stage; = UEFA Champions League Groups stage; = UEFA Champions League Qualifying round; = 2004–05 UEFA Cup; = 2004–05 Serie B

==== Matches ====
31 August 2003 1	Bologna	2–2	Parma	Bologna
20:30 CEST (UTC+02:00)	Guly 8'; Locatelli 78'	Report	Adriano 20', 87'	Stadium: Stadio Renato Dall'Ara; Attendance: 21,414; Referee: Cosimo Bolognino

14 September 2003 2	Parma	3–0	Perugia	Parma
15:00 CEST (UTC+02:00)	Bresciano 27'; Adriano 50' (pen.); Gilardino 83'	Report		Stadium: Stadio Ennio Tardini; Attendance: 13,815; Referee: Massimiliano Saccani

21 September 2003 3	Lazio	2–3	Parma	Rome
15:00 CEST (UTC+02:00)	Stam 33'; S. Inzaghi 79'	Report	Bresciano 1', 88'; Adriano 63'	Stadium: Stadio Olimpico; Attendance: 48,500; Referee: Cosimo Bolognino

28 September 2003 4	Parma	1–1	Siena	Parma
15:00 CEST (UTC+02:00)	Adriano 79'	Report	Lazetić 41'	Stadium: Stadio Ennio Tardini; Attendance: 15,412; Referee: Domenico Messina

5 October 2003 5	Parma	1–0	Sampdoria	Parma
15:00 CEST (UTC+02:00)	Adriano 19'	Report		Stadium: Stadio Ennio Tardini; Attendance: 18,102; Referee: Stefano Cassarà

19 October 2003 6	Roma	2–0	Parma	Rome
15:00 CEST (UTC+02:00)	Samuel 28'; Cassano 61'	Report		Stadium: Stadio Olimpico; Attendance: 54,531; Referee: Pierluigi Collina

26 October 2003 7	Parma	3–0	Modena	Parma
15:00 CET (UTC+01:00)	Morfeo 28'; Adriano 86'; Marchionni 88'	Report		Stadium: Stadio Ennio Tardini; Attendance: 16,938; Referee: Pasquale Rodomonti

2 November 2003 8	Brescia	2–3	Parma	Brescia
15:00 CET (UTC+01:00)	Matuzalém 4'; Di Biagio 38'	Report	Morfeo 12'; Marchionni 43'; Gilardino 71'	Stadium: Stadio Mario Rigamonti; Attendance: 13,724; Referee: Paolo Bertini

9 November 2003 9	Parma	0–0	Milan	Parma
15:00 CET (UTC+01:00)		Report		Stadium: Stadio Ennio Tardini; Attendance: 23,663; Referee: Pierluigi Collina

23 November 2003 10	Empoli	1–0	Parma	Empoli
15:00 CET (UTC+01:00)	Foggia 90+1'	Report		Stadium: Stadio Carlo Castellani; Attendance: 4,663; Referee: Paolo Bertini

30 November 2003 11	Parma	3–1	Chievo	Parma
15:00 CET (UTC+01:00)	Morfeo 52'; Marchionni 70'; Gilardino 81' (pen.)	Report	Pellissier 74'	Stadium: Stadio Ennio Tardini; Attendance: 12,414; Referee: Emidio Morganti

7 December 2003 12	Lecce	1–2	Parma	Lecce
15:00 CET (UTC+01:00)	Chevantón 73' (pen.)	Report	Gilardino 47', 78'	Stadium: Stadio Via del Mare; Attendance: 21,528; Referee: Mauro Bergonzi

14 December 2003 13	Juventus	4–0	Parma	Turin
15:00 CET (UTC+01:00)	Miccoli 10', 32'; Del Piero 71'; Nedvěd 72'	Report		Stadium: Stadio delle Alpi; Attendance: 35,074; Referee: Gianluca Paparesta

20 December 2003 14	Parma	1–2	Reggina	Parma
18:00 CET (UTC+01:00)	Gilardino 83' (pen.)	Report	Di Michele 27'; Cozza 90'	Stadium: Stadio Ennio Tardini; Attendance: 11,463; Referee: Massimiliano Saccani

6 January 2004 15	Ancona	0–2	Parma	Ancona
15:00 CET (UTC+01:00)		Report	Barone 27', 64'	Stadium: Stadio del Conero; Attendance: 10,433; Referee: Massimo De Santis

10 January 2004 16	Parma	1–0	Internazionale	Parma
20:30 CET (UTC+01:00)	Filippini 41'	Report		Stadium: Stadio Ennio Tardini; Attendance: 22,302; Referee: Paolo Bertini

17 January 2004 17	Udinese	1–1	Parma	Udine
20:30 CET (UTC+01:00)	Ferrari 23' (o.g.)	Report	Adriano 80'	Stadium: Stadio Friuli; Attendance: 15,012; Referee: Emilio Pellegrino

25 January 2004 18	Parma	0–0	Bologna	Parma
15:00 CET (UTC+01:00)		Report		Stadium: Stadio Ennio Tardini; Attendance: 14,251; Referee: Mauro Bergonzi

1 February 2004 19	Perugia	2–2	Parma	Perugia
15:00 CET (UTC+01:00)	Hübner 8'; Zé Maria 41' (pen.)	Report	Gilardino 35'; Morfeo 38'	Stadium: Stadio Renato Curi; Attendance: 8,835; Referee: Roberto Rosetti

8 February 2004 20	Parma	0–3	Lazio	Parma
15:00 CET (UTC+01:00)		Report	López 40' (pen.), 57'; Corradi 65'	Stadium: Stadio Ennio Tardini; Attendance: 14,208; Referee: Antonio Dattilo

15 February 2004 21	Siena	1–2	Parma	Siena
15:00 CET (UTC+01:00)	Chiesa 42'	Report	Gilardino 58'; Bresciano 90+1'	Stadium: Stadio Artemio Franchi – Montepaschi Arena; Attendance: 9,941; Referee: Roberto Rosetti

21 February 2004 22	Sampdoria	1–2	Parma	Genoa
18:00 CET (UTC+01:00)	Flores 82'	Report	Gilardino 59'; Bresciano 74'	Stadium: Stadio Luigi Ferraris; Attendance: 23,436; Referee: Stefano Farina

29 February 2004 23	Parma	1–4	Roma	Parma
15:00 CET (UTC+01:00)	Gilardino 30'	Report	Cassano 44'; Emerson 52'; Totti 70'; Mancini 77'	Stadium: Stadio Ennio Tardini; Attendance: 19,031; Referee: Pierluigi Collina

6 March 2004 24	Modena	2–2	Parma	Modena
18:00 CET (UTC+01:00)	Pivotto 42'; Domizzi 60'	Report	Gilardino 45+1' (pen.); Ferrari 87'	Stadium: Stadio Alberto Braglia; Attendance: 14,247; Referee: Tiziano Pieri

14 March 2004 25	Parma	2–2	Brescia	Parma
15:00 CET (UTC+01:00)	Carbone 4'; Marchionni 60'	Report	Di Biagio 32'; R. Baggio 74'	Stadium: Stadio Ennio Tardini; Attendance: 13,992; Referee: Paolo Dondarini

20 March 2004 26	Milan	3–1	Parma	Milan
20:30 CET (UTC+01:00)	Tomasson 33', 52'; Shevchenko 65'	Report	Gilardino 82'	Stadium: San Siro; Attendance: 63,433; Referee: Stefano Farina

28 March 2004 27	Parma	4–0	Empoli	Parma
15:00 CEST (UTC+02:00)	Barone 37'; Gilardino 60' (pen.), 63'; Bresciano 79'	Report		Stadium: Stadio Ennio Tardini; Attendance: 12,995; Referee: Nicola Rizzoli

4 April 2004 28	Chievo	0–2	Parma	Verona
15:00 CEST (UTC+02:00)		Report	Marchionni 31'; Gilardino 71'	Stadium: Stadio Marc'Antonio Bentegodi; Attendance: 11,047; Referee: Stefano Farina

10 April 2004 29	Parma	3–1	Lecce	Parma
15:00 CEST (UTC+02:00)	Carbone 1'; Gilardino 42', 84'	Report	Chevantón 63'	Stadium: Stadio Ennio Tardini; Attendance: 13,095; Referee: Tiziano Pieri

18 April 2004 30	Parma	2–2	Juventus	Parma
15:00 CEST (UTC+02:00)	Carbone 35'; Gilardino 81'	Report	Di Vaio 78'; Tudor 90+2'	Stadium: Stadio Ennio Tardini; Attendance: 20,501; Referee: Matteo Trefoloni

25 April 2004 31	Reggina	1–1	Parma	Reggio Calabria
15:00 CEST (UTC+02:00)	Torrisi 48'	Report	Bresciano 9'	Stadium: Stadio Oreste Granillo; Attendance: 19,165; Referee: Emilio Pellegrino

2 May 2004 32	Parma	3–1	Ancona	Parma
15:00 CEST (UTC+02:00)	Gilardino 9'; Carbone 15'; Bresciano 30'	Report	Bucchi 32'	Stadium: Stadio Ennio Tardini; Attendance: 12,755; Referee: Paolo Dondarini

9 May 2004 33	Internazionale	1–0	Parma	Milan
15:00 CEST (UTC+02:00)	Adriano 62'	Report		Stadium: San Siro; Attendance: 64,112; Referee: Roberto Rosetti

16 May 2004 34	Parma	4–3	Udinese	Parma
15:00 CEST (UTC+02:00)	Gilardino 60', 72', 78', 86'	Report	Krøldrup 56'; Jørgensen 75'; Jankulovski 90+2'	Stadium: Stadio Ennio Tardini; Attendance: 10,711; Referee: Matteo Trefoloni

=== Coppa Italia ===
==== Round of 16 ====
25 November 2003 First leg	Venezia	0–2	Parma	Venice
			Rosina 53'; Grieco 71'	Stadium: Stadio Pier Luigi Penzo; Referee: Daniele Tombolini

16 December 2003 Second leg	Parma	0–1 (2–1 agg.)	Venezia	Parma
			Mazzeo 90+1'	Stadium: Stadio Ennio Tardini; Referee: Marco Gabriele

==== Quarter-finals ====
13 January 2004 First leg	Lazio	2–0	Parma	Rome
	Muzzi 36'; Stanković 60'			Stadium: Stadio Olimpico; Referee: Emilio Pellegrino

20 January 2004 Second leg	Parma	1–1 (1–3 agg.)	Lazio	Parma
	Bresciano 81'		Stanković 71'	Stadium: Stadio Ennio Tardini; Referee: Emidio Morganti

=== UEFA Cup ===
==== First round ====
24 September 2003 First leg	Metalurh Donetsk (Ukraine)	1–1	(Italy) Parma	Donetsk, Ukraine
17:00 CEST (UTC+02:00)	Shyshchenko 44'; Beqiri (yellow card) 61'; Checher (yellow card) 63'	Report	Adriano 67'	Stadium: Metalurh Stadium; Referee: Tonny Kolbech Poulsen (Denmark)

15 October 2003 Second leg	Parma (Italy)	3–0 (4–1 agg.)	(Ukraine) Metalurh Donetsk	Parma, Italy
20:45 CEST (UTC+02:00)	Gilardino 44', 46'; Donadel (yellow card) 71'; Marchionni 73'	Report	Checher (yellow card) 34'	Stadium: Stadio Ennio Tardini; Referee: Leif Sundell (Sweden)

==== Second round ====
6 November 2003 First leg	Austria Salzburg	0–4	(Italy) Parma	Linz, Austria
20:30 CET (UTC+01:00)	Laeßig (yellow card) 59'	Report	Gilardino (yellow card) 8', (goal) 65'; Filippini 60' (pen.); Ferrari (yellow card) 63'; Nakata 84'; Rosina 87'	Stadium: Linzer Stadion; Referee: Eduardo Iturralde González (Spain)

27 November 2003 Second leg	Parma (Italy)	5–0 (9–0 agg.)	Austria Salzburg	Parma, Italy
18:00 CET (UTC+01:00)	Carbone 1', 7'; Filippini 43'; Sorrentino 47', 86'	Report	Winkler (yellow card) 77'; Teber (yellow card) 90'	Stadium: Stadio Ennio Tardini; Referee: Nikolay Ivanov (Russia)

==== Third round ====
26 February 2004 First leg	Parma (Italy)	0–1	(Turkey) Gençlerbirliği	Parma, Italy
19:45 CET (UTC+01:00)	Barone (yellow card) 90+2'	Report	Ümit (yellow card) 26'; Skoko 60'; Youla (yellow card) 73'	Stadium: Stadio Ennio Tardini; Referee: Wolfgang Stark (Germany)

3 March 2004 Second leg	Gençlerbirliği (Turkey)	3–0 (4–0 agg.)	(Italy) Parma	Ankara, Turkey
16:45 CET (UTC+01:00)	Daems 37' (pen.), (yellow card) 75'; Ferrari 81' (o.g.); Tandoğan 90+5'	Report	Frey (red card) 34'; Benarrivo (yellow card) 90+2'	Stadium: Ankara 19 Mayıs Stadium; Referee: Éric Poulat (France)

== Statistics ==
=== Players statistics ===
No.	Pos	Nat	Player	Total		2003-04 Serie A	
No.	Pos	Nat	Player	Apps	Goals	Apps	Goals
1	GK	(France) FRA	Sébastien Frey	33	-46	33	-46
14	DF	(Italy) ITA	Marcello Castellini	32	0	32	0
5	DF	(Italy) ITA	Daniele Bonera	24	0	24	0
28	DF	(Italy) ITA	Paolo Cannavaro	16	0	14+2	0
21	DF	(Italy) ITA	Matteo Ferrari	33	1	33	1
8	MF	(Italy) ITA	Simone Barone	33	3	33	3
15	MF	(Italy) ITA	Marco Donadel	24	0	19+5	0
23	MF	(Australia) AUS	Mark Bresciano	33	8	32+1	8
32	MF	(Italy) ITA	Marco Marchionni	32	5	30+2	5
10	MF	(Italy) ITA	Domenico Morfeo	23	4	16+7	4
11	FW	(Italy) ITA	Alberto Gilardino	34	23	27+7	23
	GK	(Italy) ITA	Sicignano	1	0	1	0
18	FW	(Italy) ITA	Benito Carbone	19	4	12+7	4
4	DF	(Croatia) CRO	Anthony Šerić	17	0	12+5	0
30	MF	(Italy) ITA	Manuele Blasi	12	0	12	0
19	DF	(Italy) ITA	Alessandro Potenza	13	0	6+7	0
7	MF	(Romania) ROU	Ianis Zicu	7	0	2+5	0
3	DF	(Italy) ITA	Antonio Benarrivo	6	0	2+4	0
20	MF	(Italy) ITA	Alessandro Rosina	7	0	1+6	0
6	DF	(Italy) ITA	Giuseppe Cardone	1	0	1	0
13	DF	(Argentina) ARG	Gabriel Oyola	1	0	0+1	0
37	FW	(Italy) ITA	Daniele Degano	4	0	1+3	0
38	FW	(Italy) ITA	Fabrizio Cammarata	8	0	0+8	0
16	DF	(Italy) ITA	Mirko Stefani	0	0	0	0
22	GK	(Italy) ITA	Giordano Vanin	0	0	0	0
24	FW	(Italy) ITA	Eliakwu	0	0	0	0
34	GK	(Italy) ITA	Marco Amelia	0	0	0	0
36	MF	(Italy) ITA	Manuele Sorti	0	0	0	0
26	MF	(Guinea) GUI	Ibrahima Camara	0	0	0	0
	DF	(Brazil) BRA	Junior	14	0	12+2	0
	MF	(Italy) ITA	Filippini	12	1	5+7	1
	MF	(Japan) JPN	Nakata	12	0	6+6	0
	FW	(Brazil) BRA	Adriano	9	8	8+1	8
	FW	(Italy) ITA	Grieco	2	0	0+2	0
	MF	(Colombia) COL	Jorge Bolaño	2	0	0+2	0

- Source: http://calcio-seriea.net/presenze/2003/1235/

=== Goalscorers ===
Rank	No.	Pos	Nat	Name	Serie A	Coppa Italia	UEFA Cup	Total
1	11	FW	(Italy)	Alberto Gilardino	23	0	3	26
2	9	FW	(Brazil)	Adriano	8	0	1	9
2	23	MF	(Australia)	Mark Bresciano	8	1	0	9
4	18	FW	(Italy)	Benito Carbone	4	0	2	6
4	32	MF	(Italy)	Marco Marchionni	5	0	1	6
6	10	MF	(Italy)	Domenico Morfeo	4	0	0	4
7	8	MF	(Italy)	Simone Barone	3	0	0	3
7	17	MF	(Italy)	Emanuele Filippini	1	0	2	3
9	20	MF	(Italy)	Alessandro Rosina	0	1	1	2
9	27	FW	(Italy)	Tonino Sorrentino	0	0	2	2
11	7	MF	(Japan)	Hidetoshi Nakata	0	0	1	1
11	19	FW	(Italy)	Gaetano Grieco	0	1	0	1
11	21	DF	(Italy)	Matteo Ferrari	1	0	0	1
Own goal					0	0	0	0
Totals					57	3	13	73

Last updated: 16 May 2004
