= 2006–07 Parma FC season =

Parma
2006–07 season
- Chairman: Guido Angiolini
- Manager: Stefano Pioli (until 11 February 2007); Claudio Ranieri (from 12 February 2007)
- Serie A: 12th
- Coppa Italia: Quarter-finals
- UEFA Cup: Round of 32
- Top goalscorer: League: Igor Budan (13); All: Igor Budan (16)
Home colours	Away colours	Third colours

== First-team squad ==
Note: Flags indicate national team as defined under FIFA eligibility rules; some limited exceptions apply. Players may hold more than one non-FIFA nationality.

No.	Pos.	Nation	Player
3	DF	(Italy) ITA	Giuseppe Cardone
4	MF	(Italy) ITA	Daniele Dessena
5	GK	(Italy) ITA	Luca Bucci
6	MF	(Colombia) COL	Jorge Bolano
7	DF	(Italy) ITA	Paolo Castellini
8	FW	(Italy) ITA	Giuseppe Rossi
9	FW	(Bosnia and Herzegovina) BIH	Zlatan Muslimović
11	FW	(Belarus) BLR	Vitali Kutuzov
13	MF	(Australia) AUS	Vince Grella
14	DF	(Italy) ITA	Matteo Contini
15	MF	(Italy) ITA	Filippo Savi
16	DF	(Italy) ITA	Michele Rinaldi
18	MF	(Italy) ITA	Andrea Gasbarroni
19	FW	(Italy) ITA	Andrea Pisanu
20	FW	(Croatia) CRO	Igor Budan
21	MF	(Italy) ITA	Luca Cigarini
23	GK	(Italy) ITA	Alfonso De Lucia

No.	Pos.	Nation	Player
24	DF	(Portugal) POR	Fernando Couto
25	DF	(Italy) ITA	Armando Perna
26	DF	(Italy) ITA	Damiano Ferronetti
27	MF	(Italy) ITA	Matteo Mandorlini
28	DF	(Italy) ITA	Massimo Paci
32	GK	(Italy) ITA	Fabio Virgili
33	DF	(Senegal) SEN	Ferdinand Coly
34	MF	(Italy) ITA	Filippo Savi
35	FW	(Italy) ITA	Daniele Paponi
37	DF	(Italy) ITA	Francesco Pambianchi
40	FW	(Italy) ITA	Pietro Lorenzini
43	MF	(Italy) ITA	Federico Moretti
80	DF	(Italy) ITA	Antonio Bocchetti

=== Left club during season ===
Note: Flags indicate national team as defined under FIFA eligibility rules; some limited exceptions apply. Players may hold more than one non-FIFA nationality.

No.	Pos.	Nation	Player
17	DF	(Italy) ITA	Marco Rossi (on loan to Modena)
25	DF	(Italy) ITA	Alberto Galuppo (on loan to Grosseto)
29	FW	(Slovenia) SVN	Zlatko Dedić (to Frosinone)

No.	Pos.	Nation	Player
41	MF	(Italy) ITA	Maurizio Ciaramitaro (on loan from Palermo)
—	FW	(Italy) ITA	Francesco Ruopolo (to AlbinoLeffe)

== Results ==
=== Serie A ===
10 September 2006 1	Torino	1–1	Parma	Stadio Olimpico di Torino, Turin
	Stellone 90'		Budan 55'

17 September 2006 2	Parma	0–2	Milan	Stadio Ennio Tardini, Parma
			Seedorf 25'; Kaká 85'

20 September 2006 3	Fiorentina	1–0	Parma	Stadio Artemio Franchi, Florence
	Mutu 17'

24 September 2006 4	Parma	0–4	Roma	Stadio Ennio Tardini, Parma
			Montella 5'; Perrotta 45+1'; Rosi 54'; Aquilani 90+3'

1 October 2006 5	Sampdoria	3–2	Parma	Stadio Luigi Ferraris, Genoa
	Franceschini 22'; Delvecchio 53'; Castellini 63' (o.g.)		Dessena 4'; Contini 78' (pen.)

15 October 2006 6	Parma	0–3	Udinese	Stadio Ennio Tardini, Parma
			Muntari 8'; Iaquinta 12' (pen.), 66'

22 October 2006 7	Parma	1–0	Ascoli	Stadio Ennio Tardini, Parma
	Budan 11'

25 October 2006 8	Reggina	3–2	Parma	Stadio Oreste Granillo, Reggio Calabria
	Amoruso 33', 78'; Bianchi 76'		Budan 39'; Gasbarroni 85'

29 October 2006 9	Parma	3–1	Atalanta	Stadio Ennio Tardini, Parma
	Budan 1'; Grella 70' (pen.); Muslimović 87'		Doni 58'

4 November 2006 10	Siena	2–2	Parma	Stadio Artemio Franchi, Siena
	Bogdani 77', 90+3'		Morfeo 36'; Budan 70'

12 November 2006 11	Parma	1–2	Internazionale	Stadio Ennio Tardini, Parma
	Budan 27'		Ibrahimović 16'; Cruz 90+2'

19 November 2006 12	Livorno	3–0	Parma	Stadio Armando Picchi, Livorno
	Pfertzel 26'; Ferronetti 70' (o.g.); Lucarelli 82'

26 November 2006 13	Catania	2–0	Parma	Stadio Angelo Massimino, Catania
	Spinesi 22' (pen.); Caserta 84'

3 December 2006 14	Parma	0–0	Palermo	Stadio Ennio Tardini, Parma

10 December 2006 15	Cagliari	0–0	Parma	Stadio Sant'Elia, Cagliari

17 December 2006 16	Parma	2–2	Chievo	Stadio Ennio Tardini, Parma
	Budan 26'; Dessena 58'		Zanchetta 23' (pen.); D'Anna 66'

20 December 2006 17	Messina	1–1	Parma	Stadio San Filippo, Messina
	Di Napoli 73'		Paponi 77'

23 December 2006 18	Parma	1–3	Lazio	Stadio Ennio Tardini, Parma
	Budan 20'		Stendardo 30'; Pandev 34'; Rocchi 45+1'

13 January 2007 19	Empoli	2–0	Parma	Stadio Carlo Castellani, Empoli
	Raggi 26'; Matteini 76'

21 January 2007 20	Parma	1–0	Torino	Stadio Ennio Tardini, Parma
	Rossi 75'

28 January 2007 21	Milan	1–0	Parma	San Siro, Milan
	Inzaghi 76'

3 February 2007^{1} 22	Parma	Postponed	Fiorentina	Stadio Ennio Tardini, Parma

11 February 2007 23	Roma	3–0	Parma	Stadio Olimpico, Rome
	Totti 50'; Perrotta 66'; Taddei 90+5'	[ Report]

18 February 2007 24	Parma	0–1	Sampdoria	Stadio Ennio Tardini, Parma
			Quagliarella 58'

25 February 2007 25	Udinese	3–3	Parma	Stadio Friuli, Udine
	Di Natale 42', 68' (pen.); Obodo 84'		Budan 8'; Parravicini 78'; Rossi 86' (pen.)

28 February 2007 26	Ascoli	0–0	Parma	Stadio Cino e Lillo Del Duca, Ascoli Piceno

4 March 2007 27	Parma	2–2	Reggina	Stadio Ennio Tardini, Parma
	Budan 23'; Rossi 90+7' (pen.)		Bianchi 14', 40'

11 March 2007 28	Atalanta	1–1	Parma	Stadio Atleti Azzurri d'Italia, Bergamo
	Defendi 54'		Coly 88'

18 March 2007 29	Parma	1–0	Siena	Stadio Ennio Tardini, Parma
	Gasbarroni 19'

1 April 2007 30	Internazionale	2–0	Parma	San Siro, Milan
	Maxwell 56'; Crespo 70'

7 April 2007 31	Parma	1–0	Livorno	Stadio Ennio Tardini, Parma
	Rossi 90'

15 April 2007 32	Parma	1–1	Catania	Stadio Ennio Tardini, Parma
	Cigarini 31'		Spinesi 20'

18 April 2007^{1} 22	Parma	2–0	Fiorentina	Stadio Ennio Tardini, Parma
	Rossi 27', 89' (pen.)

22 April 2007 33	Palermo	3–4	Parma	Stadio Renzo Barbera, Palermo
	Bresciano 36'; Di Michele 45+1' (pen.); Zaccardo 90'		Budan 25'; Couto 48'; Gasbarroni 72'; Rossi 81'

29 April 2007 34	Parma	2–1	Cagliari	Stadio Ennio Tardini, Parma
	Budan 29'; Gasbarroni 77' (pen.)		Conti 67'

6 May 2007 35	Chievo	1–0	Parma	Stadio Marc'Antonio Bentegodi, Verona
	Pellissier 5'

13 May 2007 36	Parma	4–1	Messina	Stadio Ennio Tardini, Parma
	Rossi 23', 76'; Muslimović 29'; Gasbarroni 79'		Riganò 87'

19 May 2007 37	Lazio	0–0	Parma	Stadio Olimpico, Rome

27 May 2007 38	Parma	3–1	Empoli	Stadio Ennio Tardini, Parma
	Muslimović 8'; Budan 16'; Gasbarroni 88'		Saudati 28'

Notes

- Note 1: Matches scheduled for 3/4 February 2007 were postponed due to the death of a police agent at the Catania vs Palermo match. NB: following the death of a police agent on Feb 2, all matches in stadiums not meeting the security standards will be played behind closed doors; the only Serie A stadiums currently fulfilling all standards are those in Rome, Genoa, Siena, Cagliari, Turin (Olimpico) and Palermo.

==== League table ====
Pos	Team	Pld	W	D	L	GF	GA	GD	Pts
10	Udinese	38	12	10	16	49	55	−6	46
11	Livorno	38	10	13	15	41	54	−13	43
12	Parma	38	10	12	16	41	56	−15	42
13	Catania	38	10	11	17	46	68	−22	41
14	Reggina (Note: Fiorentina were docked 15 points, Reggina 11 points, Milan 8 points and Lazio 3 points, all for involvement in the 2006 Italian football scandal.)	38	12	15	11	52	50	+2	40

Rules for classification: 1) points; 2) goal difference; 3) number of goals scored.

=== Coppa Italia ===
9 November 2006 Round of 16; First leg	Napoli	1–0	Parma	Stadio San Paolo, Naples
	Bucchi 68' (pen.)	[Report]

7 December 2006 Round of 16; Second leg	Parma	3–1	Napoli	Stadio Ennio Tardini, Parma
	Cigarini 47' (pen.); Dedić 55', 68'	[Report]	Dalla Bona 85'

Parma won 3-2 on aggregate.

10 January 2007 Quarterfinals; First leg	Roma	2–1	Parma	Stadio Olimpico, Rome
	Mancini 18'; Totti 66'	[Report]	Dedić 87'

17 January 2007 Quarterfinals; Second leg	Parma	2–2	Roma	Stadio Ennio Tardini, Parma
	Muslimović 12', 43'	[Report]	De Rossi 30'; Pizarro 85'

Parma lost 4–3 on aggregate.

=== UEFA Cup ===
==== First round ====
14 September 2006 First leg	Rubin Kazan (Russia)	0–1	(Italy) Parma	Tsentralnyi Stadion, Kazan
15:30 C.E.T.		Report	Dessena 79'	Referee: Athanassios Briakos (Greece)

28 September 2006 Second leg	Parma (Italy)	1–0	(Russia) Rubin Kazan	Stadio Ennio Tardini, Parma
18:30 C.E.T.	Paponi 49'	Report		Referee: Michael Weiner (Germany)

==== Group stage ====
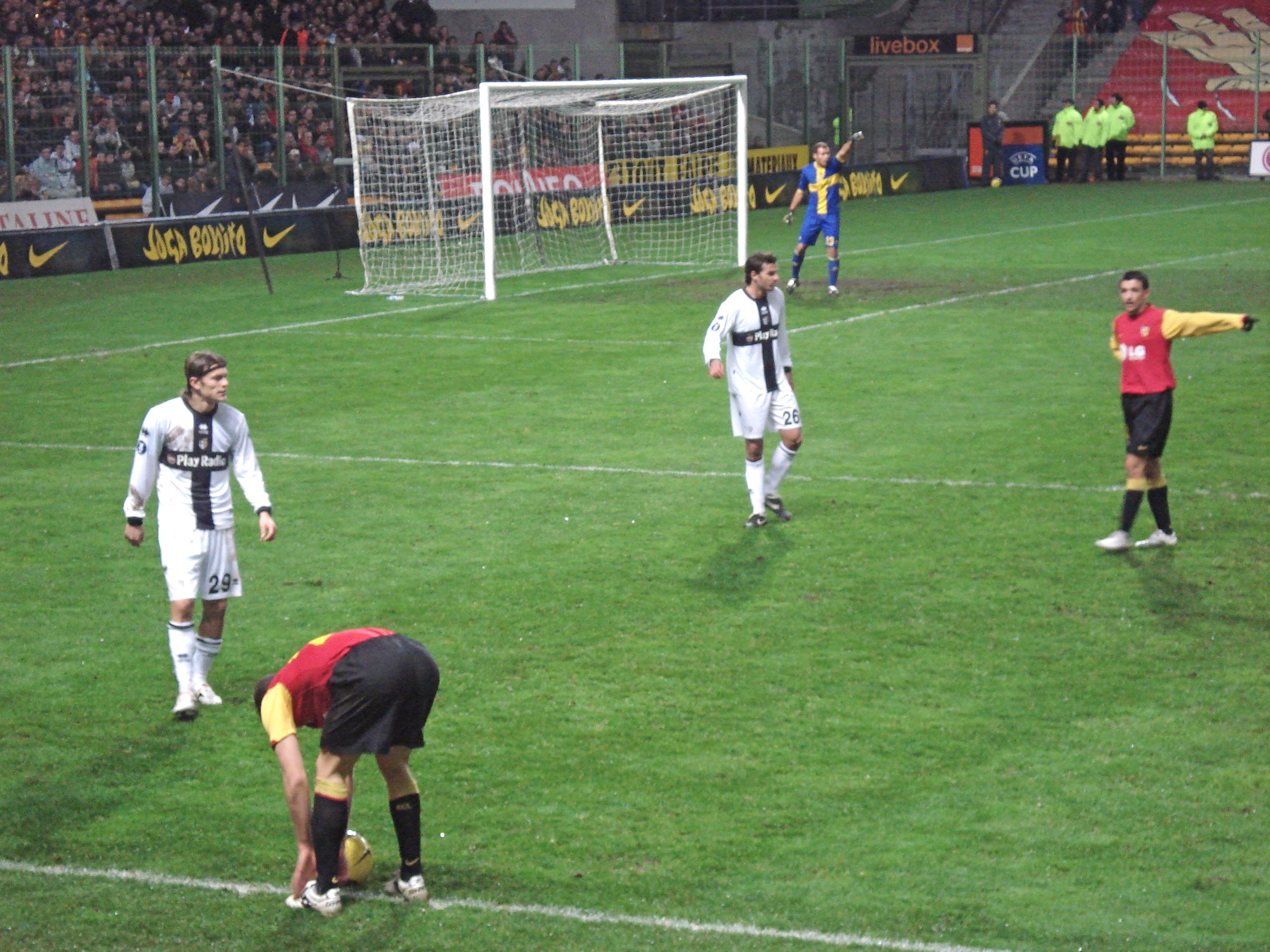
UEFA Cup vs Lens.

Pos	Team	Pld	W	D	L	GF	GA	GD	Pts	Qualification	PAR	OSA	LEN	ODE	HVN
1	(Italy) Parma	4	3	0	1	6	6	0	9	Advance to knockout stage	—	0–3	—	—	2–1
2	(Spain) Osasuna	4	2	1	1	7	4	+3	7	Advance to knockout stage	—	—	—	3–1	0–0
3	(France) Lens	4	1	1	2	5	5	0	4	Advance to knockout stage	1–2	3–1	—	—	—
4	(Denmark) Odense	4	1	1	2	5	6	−1	4		1–2	—	1–1	—	—
5	(Netherlands) Heerenveen	4	1	1	2	2	4	−2	4		—	—	1–0	0–2	—

19 October 2006 1	Odense (Denmark)	1–2	(Italy) Parma	TRE-FOR Park, Odense
20:45 C.E.T.	Hansen 7'	Report	Dessena 40'; Budan 50'	Referee: Serge Gumienny (Belgium)

23 November 2006 2	Parma (Italy)	2–1	(Netherlands) Heerenveen	Stadio Ennio Tardini, Parma
20:45 C.E.T.	Budan 23', 72'	Report	Pranjić 21'	Referee: Mark Halsey (England)

29 November 2006 3	Lens (France)	1–2	(Italy) Parma	Stade Félix Bollaert, Lens
20:45 C.E.T.	Cousin 20'	Report	Dedić 78'; Paponi 90+2'	Referee: Stuart Dougal (Scotland)

14 December 2006 4	Parma (Italy)	0–3	(Spain) Osasuna	Stadio Ennio Tardini, Parma
20:45 C.E.T.		[Report]	López 33', 44'; Juanfran 82'	Referee: Selçuk Dereli (Turkey)

==== Knockout stage ====
15 February 2007 First leg	Braga (Portugal)	1–0	(Italy) Parma	Estádio Municipal de Braga, Braga
20:00 C.E.T.	Zé Carlos 81'	Report		Referee: Damir Skomina (Slovenia)

22 February 2007 Second leg	Parma (Italy)	0–1	(Portugal) Braga	Stadio Ennio Tardini, Parma
20:45 C.E.T.		Report	Costa 90'	Referee: Vladimír Hriňák (Slovakia)

Parma lost 2-0 on aggregate.

== Squad statistics ==
=== Top scorers ===
Place	Position	Nation	Number	Name	Serie A	Coppa Italia	UEFA Cup	Total
1	FW	(Croatia)	20	Igor Budan	13	0	3	16
2	FW	(Italy)	21	Giuseppe Rossi	9	0	0	9
3	MF	(Italy)	18	Andrea Gasbarroni	6	0	0	6
4	FW	(Bosnia and Herzegovina)	9	Zlatan Muslimović	3	2	0	5
5	FW	(Slovenia)	29	Zlatko Dedić	0	3	1	4
5	MF	(Italy)	4	Daniele Dessena	2	0	2	4
7	FW	(Italy)	35	Daniele Paponi	1	0	2	3
8	MF	(Italy)	21	Luca Cigarini	1	0	1	2
9	DF	(Italy)	14	Matteo Contini	1	0	0	1
9	MF	(Australia)	13	Vincenzo Grella	1	0	0	1
9	FW	(Italy)		Domenico Morfeo	1	0	0	1
9	MF	(Italy)		Francesco Parravicini	1	0	0	1
9	DF	(Senegal)	33	Ferdinand Coly	1	0	0	1
9	DF	(Portugal)	24	Fernando Couto	1	0	0	1
				TOTALS	41	6	8	55

== Sources ==
- RSSSF - Italy 2006/07
