= Sodinha =

Brazilian footballer

Personal information
- Full name: Felipe Monteiro Diogo
- Date of birth: 17 July 1988 (age 38)
- Place of birth: Jundiaí, Brazil
- Height: 1.74 m (5 ft 9 in)
- Position: Midfielder

Team information
- Current team: Atletico Offlaga

Youth career
- 2005–2006: Paulista
- 2007–2008: Udinese

Senior career*
Years	Team	Apps	(Gls)
2008–2011	Udinese	0	(0)
2008–2009	→ Bari (loan)	4	(0)
2009	→ Paganese (loan)	11	(0)
2009–2010	→ Portogruaro (loan)	3	(0)
2010	→ Triestina (loan)	0	(0)
2012	Ceará	1	(0)
2012–2015	Brescia	64	(5)
2015–2016	Trapani	3	(0)
2017	Mantova	9	(2)
2017	Mestre	14	(1)
2018–2019	AC Rezzato	33	(11)
2019–2021	Modena	38	(5)
2021–2022	Franciacorta	20	(4)
2022–2023	Cast Brescia	26	(7)
2023–2024	Ospitaletto	22	(2)
2024–	Atletico Offlaga	13	(6)
- * Club domestic league appearances and goals

Felipe Monteiro Diogo (born 17 July 1988), known as Sodinha, is a Brazilian footballer who plays for Italian Prima Categoria amateur club Atletico Offlaga.

== Career ==
=== Early career ===
He began his career in the Paulista youth team, a team from his hometown, Jundiaí, and later decided to adopt the nickname "Sodinha", used by his father when he was a footballer. In 2008, at the age of 20, he was signed by Udinese, who in the following years sent him on loan to various Italian teams. He made his debut in Serie B in the 2008–09 season for Bari. At the end of the season, he had made four appearances, and Bari was promoted to Serie A by winning the championship. He would then be on loans at Paganese and Portogruaro in Lega Pro Prima Divisione.

=== Brescia ===
After being inactive for a season, he decided to return to Brazil and play for Ceará in 2012, but shortly after returned to Italy to join Brescia, in Serie B. There, he scored his first goal in a home victory over Varese. In the summer of 2014, following personal misconduct, he was demoted from the team by manager Ivo Iaconi. However, in October he was reinstated and called up.

=== Trapani and retirement ===
On 9 July 2015, Sodinha signed a one-year contract with an option with Trapani. On 7 January 2016, he terminated his contract by mutual consent and retired from football at the age of 27, due to lingering injuries.

=== Return and lower leagues ===
In January 2017, having been cleared of injuries, he decided to return to football and signed a contract with Mantova in Lega Pro. In the summer of the same year, he signed a contract with Mestre, a team competing in Serie C, for the 2017–18 season. During the January 2018 transfer marketm he moved to AC Rezzato, a Serie D club in the Province of Brescia.

=== Modena ===
On 17 July 2019, Sodinha returned to professional football by signing for Modena in Serie C. His debut came on the second matchday against Piacenza, a match where he hit the crossbar after a penalty kick. In a short time, he became a cornerstone of the team under coaches Mauro Zironelli and later Michele Mignani, also becoming vice-captain of the canarino. He scored his first goal for Modena in the home match against Rimini, and later scored an important free-kick goal to equalize against Arzignano Valchiampo. In the home match against Ravenna, due to the absence of captain Armando Perna due to injury, he wore the captain's armband for the first time. At the beginning of January, in a friendly match against Colorno, he injured his calf, which sidelined him for a month and a half.

After the season was abandoned due to the COVID-19 pandemic, Modena decided to renew his contract.

=== Later years ===
In August 2021, Sodinha signed with Serie D club Franciacorta. He successively moved down to Eccellenza, winning promotion to Serie D in 2023 with Cast Brescia, and in 2024 with Ospitaletto. He then joined Prima Categoria amateurs Atletico Offlaga.
