= Alex Gibbs =

Alex Gibbs may refer to:

- Alex Gibbs (American football) (1941-2021), American football coach
- Alex Gibbs (footballer) (born 1984), Italian association football player

== See also ==
- Alexander Gibbs, British stained glass studio founded in 1858
