= Filippo Savi =

Italian footballer

Personal information
- Date of birth: 29 January 1987 (age 39)
- Place of birth: Parma, Italy
- Height: 1.74 m (5 ft 9 in)
- Position: Midfielder

Team information
- Current team: Fidenza

Youth career
- Parma

Senior career*
Years	Team	Apps	(Gls)
2005–2008	Parma	10	(0)
2007	→ Monza (loan)	9	(0)
2007–2008	→ Arezzo (loan)	19	(0)
2008–2009	SPAL	23	(0)
2009–2011	Parma	0	(0)
2009–2010	→ Carpenedolo (loan)	0	(0)
2011	→ Crociati Noceto (loan)	1	(0)
2011–2012	FC Brussels	18	(0)
2012–	Fidenza		

International career^{‡}
2003	Italy U-16	9	(0)
2003–2004	Italy U-17	6	(1)
2005	Italy U-19	5	(0)
2005–2006	Italy U-20	3	(0)
- * Club domestic league appearances and goals as of 18 May 2012 ‡ National team caps and goals as of end of 2011–12 season

Filippo Savi (born 29 January 1987) is an Italian former footballer who played for A.C. Fidenza 1922 as a midfielder.

== Biography ==
=== Parma ===
Born in Parma, Emilia–Romagna, Savi started his career at hometown club Parma. Savi made his Serie A debut on 23 April 2005, losing to A.C. Milan 0–3. He was the starting midfielder and replaced by Renato Olive after receiving a caution. He also played the next match, winning Livorno 6–4. He came off the bench in the first half to replace Jorge Bolaño in that match. That season Parma almost relegated.

Savi also played for Parma at 2004–05 UEFA Cup, which he made his professional and European debut on 14 April, a 0–0 draw with Austria Wien. He also played the next two matches, the semi-finals. The team finished as losing semi-finalists to CSKA Moskva.

In 2005–06 Serie A, Savi made 8 appearances. Due to 2006 Italian football scandal, Parma qualified to UEFA Cup again. The club chose a squad rotation tactics, which Savi played all 6 European matches in the first half of the season, including 4 starts in group stage. However, he did not play any game in 2006–07 Serie A, only 4 matches in the cup. In January 2007 he left for Monza.

==== Loans ====
Savi joined Monza in January 2007. He only played 9 games in Italian third division.

In July, he joined fellow Serie C1 club Arezzo (but in another group). He made a double figure appearances before returned to Parma.

In July 2008 he moved back to Lega Pro Prima Divisione (ex- Serie C1) for SPAL, at first on loan. On 2 February 2009 the deal became a co-ownership deal. However, in June Parma bought back Savi.

He then injured and left for Lega Pro Seconda Divisione club Carpenedolo in August 2009. Savi did not play any league match that season.

After 6 months inactive in football, Savi left for another L.P. second division club Crociati Noceto, located 12 km away from the city of Parma. He only played once.

=== FC Brussels ===
Savi moved abroad in 2011–12 season. In August 2011 it was reported that Savi was finalizing a deal to Maltese club Valletta. However, on 8 September he was signed by Belgian Second Division club FC Brussels, rejoining Parma team-mate Sulaiman Sesay Fullah and numbers of Italian trained players. Savi made his debut on 13 November 2011.

After the end of the 2011–12 season, Savi intended to retire due to a cruciate ligament tear in the knee but eventually decided to continue challenging the world of professional football. In August 2012, he joined Serie D side A.C. Fidenza 1922.

=== International career ===
Savi had played for Azzurrini from under-16 to under-20 level. He was the member of U-17 team at 2004 UEFA European Under-17 Football Championship qualification, wore no.10 shirt. In the elite round he changed to wear no.13. He played all 6 competitive matches in that tournament as starter The team finished as the runner-up in the elite round group 3, failing to advance. In the 2006 UEFA European Under-19 Football Championship qualification, he wore no.8 shirt and also played all 3 matches as starter. Azzurrini finished as the third in group 6. Since then Savi followed the team-mate promoted to Italy U-20, a bridging team between U-19 and U-21 in November 2005. However Savi failed to earn any cap since November 2006. His last call-up, however in January 2008. Savi played 3 times in total in Four Nations Tournament, in 2005–06 and 2006–07 edition.
