= Fabio Vignaroli =

Italian footballer

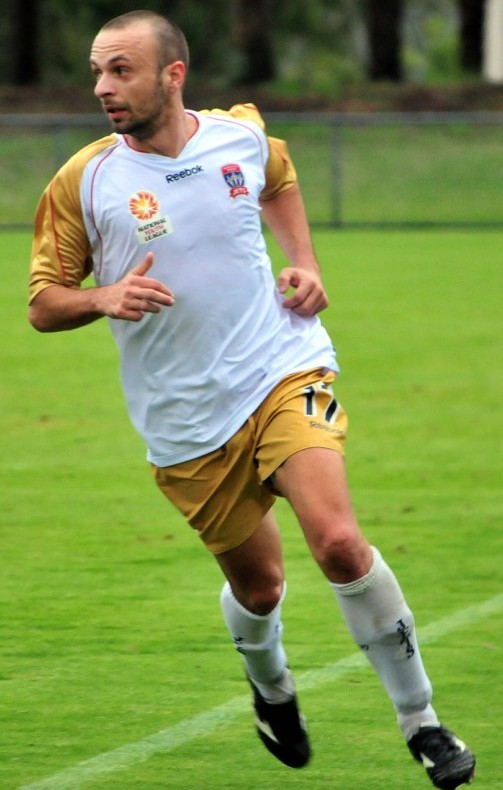

Personal information
- Date of birth: 7 June 1976 (age 50)
- Place of birth: Finale Ligure, Italy
- Height: 1.75 m (5 ft 9 in)
- Position: Midfielder

Senior career*
Years	Team	Apps	(Gls)
1994–1998	Como	78	(7)
1998–2000	Monza	51	(7)
2000–2003	Salernitana	81	(26)
2003–2005	Modena	63	(6)
2005	Parma	16	(0)
2005–2006	Bologna	31	(2)
2007	Bari	15	(0)
2007–2008	Lazio	9	(0)
2009–2010	Newcastle Jets	15	(0)
2011	Monza	14	(5)
2011–2012	Savona	14	(6)
2013	Mosta		
2013–	Balzan		
Total		367	(48)
- * Club domestic league appearances and goals

Fabio Vignaroli (born 7 June 1976) is an Italian former football midfielder who last played for the Maltese club Balzan.

== Career ==
In January 2003, he accepted an offer from the newly promoted Serie A team Modena and made his top-flight début in a 0-2 home loss to Atalanta on 25 January 2003.

After six months without a club, in February 2007, he accepted an offer from the relegation-battling Serie B side Bari.

=== Scotland ===
In October 2008, Scottish Premier League side Kilmarnock took Vignaroli on trial for a week. However, since Kilmarnock could not commit to the player until the January transfer window, Vignaroli then went on trial with fellow Scottish club Dundee F.C.

Dundee caretaker manager Davie Farrell was hoping that Vignaroli could play as a trialist in their league game against Morton. However, SFA rules forbid players from abroad to play as trialists.

=== Newcastle Jets ===
On 8 February 2009 the Newcastle Jets signed Vignaroli for a 6-month period, allowing the veteran to play for the club in the AFC Champions League 2009 tournament.

Vignaroli became the highest paid player in the history of the Newcastle Jets when the 33-year-old marquee player signed a 1-year contract worth over A$300,000. Unfortunately, Vignaroli was ruled out for the remainder of the 2009/2010 season after scans confirmed injuries to his right knee.

=== Italy return ===
In January 2011, he returned to Italy.

=== Mosta ===
Vignaroli joined Maltese Premier League side Mosta on 23 January 2013.
