= Davide Furlan =

Italian footballer (born 1986)

Personal information
- Date of birth: 18 January 1986
- Place of birth: Italy
- Position(s): Midfielder

Senior career*
| Years | Team | Apps | (Gls) |
| -2004/05 | Parma Calcio 1913 | 0 | (0) |
| 2005/06-2007/08 | Carrarese Calcio | 35+ | (1+) |
| 2008/2009 | A.S.D. Pol. Tamai | | |
| 2009-2011 | A.S.D. Sacilese Calcio | 47 | (1) |
| 2011-2012/13 | A.C. Belluno 1905 | | |
| 2012/13-2019/20 | A.S.D. Pol. Tamai | | |
| 2019/2020 | A.S.D. Sacilese Calcio | | |
| 2019/2020 | A.S.C. Godega | | |
| 2020- | A.S.D. Pol. Tamai | | |
- *Club domestic league appearances and goals

Davide Furlan (born 18 January 1986) is an Italian footballer.

== Career ==
While playing for Parma Calcio 1913, Furlan played in the 2004-05 UEFA Cup semifinals. However, he later suffered three knee injuries and by 2011, aged 25, he was playing in the Italian fourth division.
