= Lorenzo Carotti =

Italian footballer

Personal information
- Date of birth: January 31, 1985 (age 41)
- Place of birth: Jesi, Italy
- Height: 1.72 m (5 ft 8 in)
- Position: Midfielder

Team information
- Current team: Jesina

Youth career
- 2001–2004: Parma

Senior career*
Years	Team	Apps	(Gls)
2004–2005	Como	32	(3)
2005–2010	Cremonese	106	(2)
2010–2012	Pavia	61	(2)
2012–2013	Benevento	14	(0)
2013–2015	Pavia	5	(0)
2015–2016	Maceratese	22	(1)
2016–2017	Fano	11	(0)
2017–	Jesina	8	(0)

International career
2001	Italy U-15	5	(0)
2001	Italy U-17	2	(0)
2003–2004	Italy U-19	12	(0)
2004–2006	Italy U-20	11	(2)
- * Club domestic league appearances and goals as of 20 November 2017

Lorenzo Carotti (born January 31, 1985, in Jesi) is an Italian professional football player currently playing for S.S.D. Jesina Calcio.

He represented Italy at the 2004 UEFA European Under-19 Football Championship and at the 2005 FIFA World Youth Championship.
