= Daniele Dessena =

Italian professional footballer (born 1987)

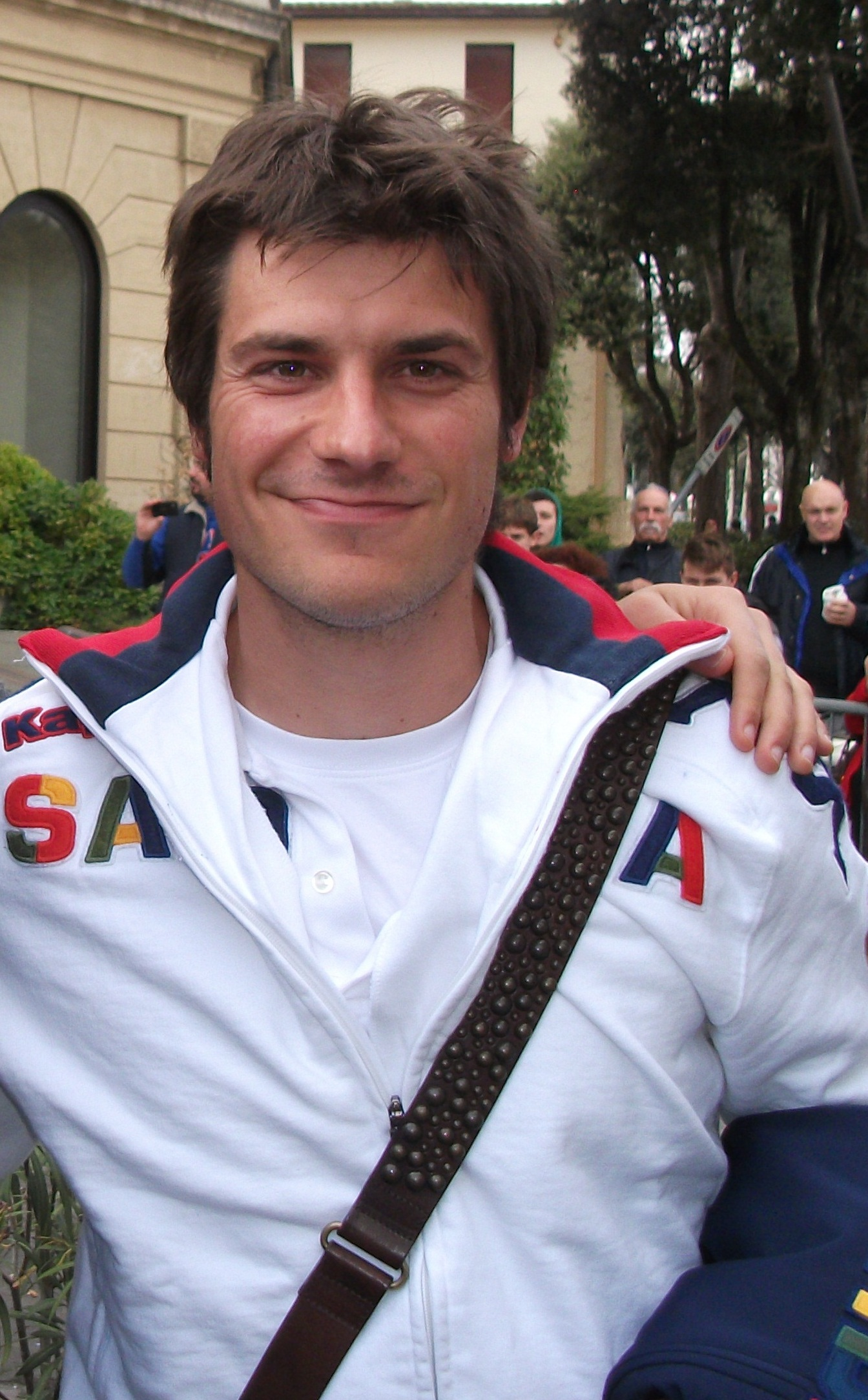
- Dessena with Cagliari in 2012

Personal information
- Full name: Daniele Dessena
- Date of birth: 10 May 1987 (age 39)
- Place of birth: Parma, Italy
- Height: 1.83 m (6 ft 0 in)
- Position: Midfielder

Youth career
- 1997–2004: Parma

Senior career*
Years	Team	Apps	(Gls)
2004–2008	Parma	81	(5)
2008–2012	Sampdoria	55	(2)
2009–2010	→ Cagliari (loan)	29	(3)
2012–2019	Cagliari	166	(7)
2019–2021	Brescia	42	(4)
2021	Pescara	13	(3)
2021–2023	Virtus Entella	35	(1)
2023	→ Olbia (loan)	12	(4)
2023–2024	Olbia	31	(4)

International career
2004	Italy U18	2	(0)
2006–2009	Italy U19	7	(1)
2006–2009	Italy U21	25	(6)
2008	Italy Olympic	2	(0)
- * Club domestic league appearances and goals as of 4 May 2024

Daniele Dessena (born 10 May 1987) is an Italian professional football coach and former player.

== Club career ==
=== Parma ===
Dessena began his football career in the youth ranks of Parma and made his official debut in the first team on 27 February 2005 against Lazio. This season also made his debut in the UEFA Cup on 24 February 2005, in a 2–0 win against VfB Stuttgart. During the 2005–06 season, he scored 3 goals in 17 games. During the 2006–07 season, Dessena became one of the star players at Parma. He made 34 Serie A appearances, scoring two goals, and also scored two goals in 6 games during the UEFA Cup campaign.

In the 2007–08 season, Dessena played in 28 Serie A games for Parma. In total, he played 101 games for Parma in all competitions, scoring seven goals in the Emilian shirt.

=== Sampdoria and Cagliari ===
In the summer of 2008, Dessena arrived at U.C. Sampdoria for a €4 million transfer fee. He made his debut on 31 August in a 1–1 draw against Inter Milan. On 23 October 2008, he scored his first goal for Sampdoria against Partizan Belgrade in the group stage of the UEFA Cup. He also scored a brace for Sampdoria in a 5–0 victory against Reggina on 9 May 2009. He made 25 appearances and scored two goals during his first season at the club.

On 31 August 2009, he joined fellow Serie A side Cagliari. On 27 September, he scored his first goal for Cagliari in the game against his former team, Parma. He scored again on 18 October against Catania and on 14 March 2010 against Genoa.

On 25 June 2010, he was re-signed by Sampdoria after being brought back to the club by his former Parma Manager Domenico Di Carlo. Despite playing in a UEFA Champions League qualifier game for Sampdoria during the 2010–11 season, Sampdoria had to settle for a place in the UEFA Europa League after failing to progress to the group stages. Dessena made six appearances for Sampdoria during the Europa League campaign. However, the Serie A season ended in relegation to Serie B. Dessena stayed with the club in Serie B, making eight appearances during the first half of the 2011–12 season.

=== Cagliari ===
Having made only eight appearances in 2011–12 during the first part of the season for Sampdoria in Serie B, Dessena was loaned to Serie A club Cagliari in January for the remainder of the season. He made 12 appearances and scored 1 goal. After impressing during his 6-month loan spell, he joined Cagliari on a permanent deal in July 2012.

In the 2012–13 season, he made 31 appearances and scored three goals under managers Massimo Ficcadenti and Ivo Pulga.

In the 2013–14 season, he was deployed more frequently in a holding midfield position under the new manager Luis Diego López.

=== Brescia ===
On 10 January 2019, Dessena signed with Serie B club Brescia.

=== Pescara ===
On 1 February 2021, Dessena signed with Serie B club Pescara.

=== Serie C ===
On 20 July 2021, he signed with Virtus Entella. On 1 February 2023, Dessena moved on loan to Olbia, with an obligation to buy. He retired in June 2024.

== International career ==
Dessena made two appearances for the Italy U18 team and 7 appearances for the U-19 team.

In May 2008, he won the Toulon Tournament with the Italy National Olympic team, assisting teammate Dani Osvaldo for the only goal of the victorious final against Chile. During the event, he scored a goal in Italy's victory over the United States. He played for Italy at the 2008 Summer Olympics in Beijing.

From 2006 to 2009, he was a regular member of the Italy U-21s, coached by Pierluigi Casiraghi.

In May 2009, he was called up to the European Championships but only made substitute appearances as second choice behind Luca Cigarini and Claudio Marchisio. He finished with a bronze medal, with Italy finishing in 3rd.

== Coaching career ==
After retiring, he became Leandro Greco's assistant at Frosinone 's Under-19 team, then followed him to the first team after he was promoted.

He successively served as Greco's right-hand man at Pro Patria from July to December 2025.

== Career statistics ==
Updated 15 August 2020

Appearances and goals by club, season and competition
Club	Season	League			Cup		Europe		Other		Total	
Club	Season	Division	Apps	Goals	Apps	Goals	Apps	Goals	Apps	Goals	Apps	Goals
Parma	2004–05	Serie A	2	0	1	0	6	0	2	0	11	0
Parma	2005–06	Serie A	17	3	3	0	–		–		20	3
Parma	2006–07	Serie A	34	2	3	0	6	2	–		43	4
Parma	2007–08	Serie A	28	0	1	0	–		–		29	0
Parma	Total		81	5	8	0	12	2	2	0	103	7
Sampdoria	2008–09	Serie A	25	2	2	0	6	1	–		33	3
Sampdoria	2010–11	Serie A	22	0	1	0	7	0	–		30	0
Sampdoria	2011–12	Serie B	8	0	1	0	–		–		9	0
Sampdoria	Total		55	2	4	0	13	1	0	0	72	3
Cagliari (loan)	2009–10	Serie A	29	3	0	0	–		–		29	3
Cagliari	2011–12	Serie A	12	1	0	0	–		–		12	1
Cagliari	2012–13	Serie A	31	3	3	0	–		–		34	3
Cagliari	2013–14	Serie A	33	0	1	0	–		–		34	0
Cagliari	2014–15	Serie A	28	1	2	0	–		–		30	1
Cagliari	2015–16	Serie B	16	0	2	1	–		–		18	1
Cagliari	2016–17	Serie A	18	2	1	0	–		–		19	2
Cagliari	2017–18	Serie A	17	0	1	1	–		–		18	1
Cagliari	2018–19	Serie A	11	0	1	0	–		–		12	0
Cagliari	Total		195	10	11	2	0	0	0	0	206	12
Brescia	2018–19	Serie B	11	1	0	0	–		–		11	1
Brescia	2019–20	Serie A	24	2	0	0	–		–		24	2
Brescia	2020–21	Serie B	18	2	1	0	–		–		19	2
Brescia	Total		53	5	1	0	0	0	0	0	54	5
Pescara	2020–21	Serie B	13	3	0	0	–		–		13	3
Virtus Entella	2021–22	Serie C	22	1	–		–		–		22	1
Career total			419	26	24	2	25	3	2	0	470	31

== Honours ==
Cagliari

- Serie B: 2015–16

Italy U21

- Toulon Tournament: 2008
- UEFA European Under-21 Championship bronze: 2009
