= Armando Perna =

Italian footballer (born 1981)

Personal information
- Date of birth: 25 April 1981 (age 45)
- Place of birth: Palermo, Italy
- Height: 1.84 m (6 ft 0 in)
- Position: Centre-back

Team information
- Current team: Cosenza (vice sports director)

Youth career
- Palermo

Senior career*
| Years | Team | Apps | (Gls) |
| 1998–2000 | Palermo | 11 | (0) |
| 2000–2001 | → Udinese (loan) | 0 | (0) |
| 2001–2003 | Livorno | 22 | (0) |
| 2003–2004 | → Salernitana (loan) | 38 | (2) |
| 2004–2013 | Modena | 210 | (1) |
| 2007 | → Parma (loan) | 6 | (0) |
| 2013–2014 | Padova | 9 | (0) |
| 2014–2015 | Correggese | 13 | (1) |
| 2015 | Paganese | 11 | (0) |
| 2015–2016 | Altovicentino | 29 | (0) |
| 2016–2017 | Maceratese | 27 | (0) |
| 2017–2018 | Mestre | 32 | (1) |
| 2018–2020 | Modena | 46 | (0) |
| 2020–2021 | Legnago | 32 | (0) |

Managerial career
- 2021–2022: Legnago (assistant)
- 2022–: Cosenza (vice sports director)
- * Club domestic league appearances and goals

Armando Perna (born 25 April 1981) is an Italian football coach and former centre-back who is currently a part of the technical management of Cosenza Calcio.

== Career ==
He started his career at Serie C1 team Palermo. He was loaned to Serie A Udinese youth team in 2000. In 2001, he was loaned to Livorno, another Serie C1 team, playing 10 games. After Livorno won promotion, the team signed him permanently. He found it difficult to win a regular place, just playing 12 games in his first Serie B season.

He was loaned out again, this time to Salernitana and Modena, both Serie B. Modena F.C. signed him in a co-ownership deal in 2005, and gained full ownership in 2006.

He was loaned to Parma in January 2007, until the end of the season.

On 7 September 2020 he moved to Legnago. After one season as a team captain, in June 2021 Perna announced his retirement, whilst remaining at Legnago as an assistant coach to manager Giovanni Colella. After manager Michele Serena's sacking on March 28, 2022, Perna became interim head coach of the club. However, later that same day, Legnago confirmed that the club's former head coach, Giovanni Colella, who was the coach Perna started as an assistant coach under at Legnago, had been re-hired, with Perna continuing as an assistant.

In July 2022, he was hired by Cosenza, where he was to act as sporting director Roberto Gemmi's right-hand man.
