= Alex Gibbs (footballer) =

Italian footballer (born 1984)

Personal information
- Full name: Alex Mansfield Gibbs
- Date of birth: 25 January 1984 (age 42)
- Place of birth: Desio, Italy
- Position: Striker

Senior career*
Years	Team	Apps	(Gls)
1999–2002	Monza	2	(0)
2002–2005	Parma	4	(0)
2004	→ Meda (loan)	14	(6)
2005–2007	Pro Patria	22	(6)
2007–2008	Gubbio	13	(3)
2008	Juvenes	9	(7)
2008	Fermana	18	(8)
2009–2011	Arquata	50	(44)
2011	Sambenedettese	3	(0)
2011–2012	Castelfidardo	8	(4)
2012–2013	Vis Torgiano	23	(15)
2013	Castel del Piano	3	(1)
2013	Deruta	15	(2)
2014–2018	San Donato Tavarnelle	92	(83)
2018–2019	Trasimeno	22	(10)
2019–2020	Montone	22	(11)
2020–2023	Mantignana	52	(24)
2023	Cortona-Camucia		
- * Club domestic league appearances and goals

Alex Mansfield Gibbs (born 25 January 1984) is an Italian former footballer who played as a striker.

== Early life ==
Gibbs was born in 1984 in Desio, Italy to a South African family. He is the brother of Italian footballer Dion Gibbs.

== Career ==
Gibbs started his career with Italian side Monza. In 2002, he signed for Italian Serie A side Parma. In 2004, he signed for Italian side Meda. In 2005, he signed for Italian side Pro Patria. In 2007, he signed for Italian side Gubbio. In 2008, he signed for Italian side Juvenes. After that, he signed for Italian side Fermana. In 2014, he signed for Italian side San Donato Tavarnelle. He helped the club achieve promotion.

== Style of play ==
Gibbs mainly operated as a striker. He received comparisons to Sweden international Zlatan Ibrahimovic.

== Personal life ==
He has undergone heart surgery.
