= Matteo Contini =

Italian footballer and coach (born 1980)

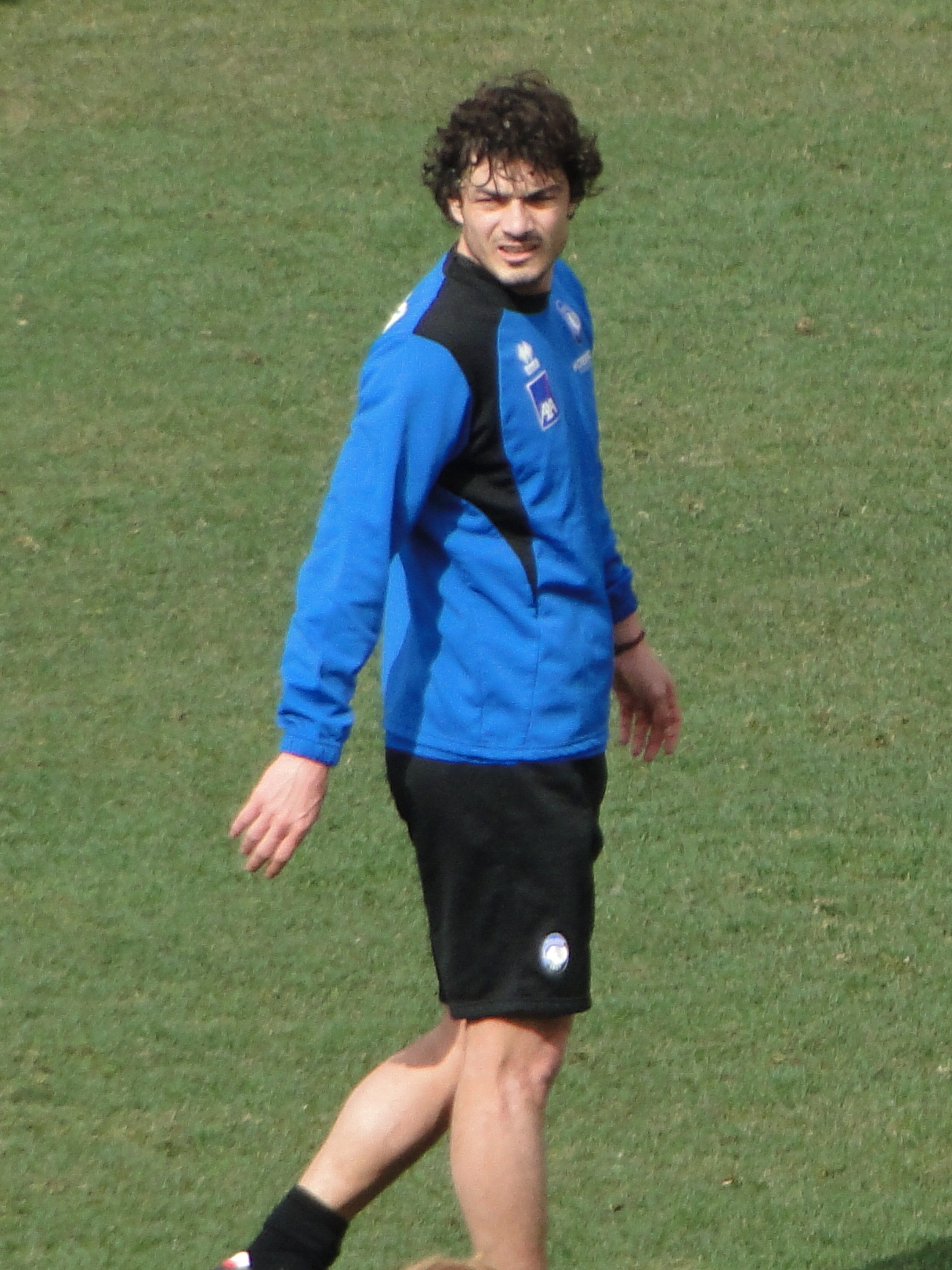

Personal information
- Date of birth: 16 April 1980 (age 46)
- Place of birth: Gemonio, Italy
- Height: 1.82 m (6 ft 0 in)
- Positions: Centre-back; left-back

Team information
- Current team: Legnago Salus (head coach)

Youth career
- Milan

Senior career*
Years	Team	Apps	(Gls)
1999–2001	Milan	0	(0)
1999–2000	→ Livorno (loan)	15	(0)
2000–2001	→ SPAL (loan)	17	(0)
2001–2002	Monza	25	(0)
2002–2003	L'Aquila	33	(2)
2003–2004	Milan	0	(0)
2003–2004	→ Avellino (loan)	39	(1)
2004–2007	Parma	89	(2)
2007–2010	Napoli	75	(1)
2010–2011	Zaragoza	39	(1)
2011–2013	Siena	26	(0)
2013–2017	Atalanta	3	(0)
2013–2014	→ Juve Stabia (loan)	27	(0)
2014–2015	→ Bari (loan)	28	(0)
2015–2016	→ Bari (loan)	18	(0)
2016–2017	→ Ternana (loan)	21	(0)
2017	Carrarese	0	(0)
2017–2018	Pergolettese	10	(0)

Managerial career
- 2018–2019: Pergolettese
- 2020: Pergolettese
- 2021–2022: Giana Erminio
- 2024–: Legnago Salus
- * Club domestic league appearances and goals

Matteo Contini (born 16 April 1980) is an Italian football coach and former player. He played as a centre-back or left-back. He is currently in charge as head coach of Serie D club Legnago Salus.

== Playing career ==
=== AC Milan ===
Contini started his professional career in the A.C. Milan youth system. He was then farmed to Serie C1 teams Livorno (loan), SPAL (loan), Monza (co-ownership) and L'Aquila (co-ownership) between 1999 and 2003 and Serie B team Avellino in 2003–04 Serie B season.

=== Parma ===
Contini's 50% registration rights was bought by Parma in 2004 for €180,000 fee that became full ownership in 2005 for an additional fee of €400,000. He played for Parma in the 2004–05 UEFA Cup and the 2006–07 UEFA Cup.

=== Napoli ===
In 2007, Contini was signed by S.S.C. Napoli for €3.2 million. He played for Napoli in Serie A as well as in the Italian Cup, 2008 UEFA Intertoto Cup and 2008–09 UEFA Cup.

=== Zaragoza ===
On 27 January 2010 Contini was loaned to Real Zaragoza with option to purchase.

On 8 July 2010, Zaragoza made the purchase option, for €2 million and signed Contini on a three-year deal.

=== Siena ===
On 8 August 2011, after a year and a half in Spain, Contini returned to Italy, taken from Siena on a season-long loan for €300,000 with option to buy the registration rights. He wore number 80 shirt for 2011–12 Serie A. In July 2012, Contini signed a permanent deal with Siena, which the club declared the total cost including misc cost was €1,374,239. He signed a two-year contract. Contini changed to wear number 22 in 2012–13 Serie A.

=== Atalanta ===
Six months after joining Siena definitively, Contini joined Atalanta for €1 million in an initial 3 1/2-year contract. Contini kept to use number 22 shirt for "blue-black". On 30 August 2013, he went on loan to Juve Stabia.

In the next three seasons, he was loaned to Bari (twice) and Ternana.

He retired in 2018 after a season with Serie D amateurs Pergolettese.

== Coaching career ==
After retirement, he stayed at Pergolettese as a youth coach. On 6 November 2018, he was promoted to head coach of the Serie D club and guided his club to promotion to Serie C by the end of the season. He was dismissed on 12 November 2019 after the club started their Serie C season with five draws and nine losses in the first 14 games. He was re-hired by Pergolettese on 19 June 2020. He resigned from Pergolettese on 15 November 2020.

On 11 November 2021, he was hired by Serie C club Giana Erminio. After suffering relegation to Serie D following a 2–4 aggregate loss Trento in the playoffs, on 27 May 2022 Giana Erminio announced Contini's departure from the club.

On 27 September 2024, Contini returned to management as the new head coach of struggling Serie C club Legnago Salus.
