= Daniele Bonera =

Italian footballer (born 1981)

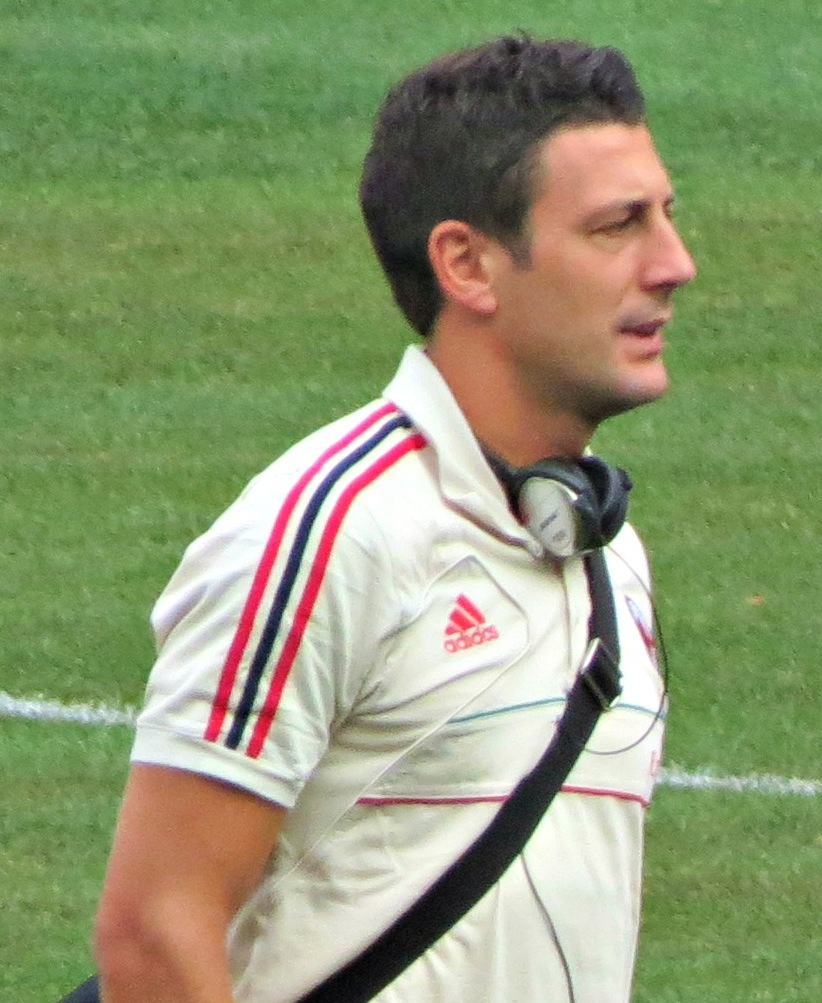
- Bonera with AC Milan in 2012

Personal information
- Full name: Daniele Bonera
- Date of birth: 31 May 1981 (age 45)
- Place of birth: Brescia, Italy
- Height: 1.83 m (6 ft 0 in)
- Position: Centre back

Team information
- Current team: Pro Vercelli (head coach)

Youth career
- 1995–1999: Brescia

Senior career*
| Years | Team | Apps | (Gls) |
| 1999–2002 | Brescia | 60 | (0) |
| 2002–2006 | Parma | 114 | (1) |
| 2006–2015 | AC Milan | 152 | (0) |
| 2015–2019 | Villarreal | 40 | (0) |
| Total | | 366 | (1) |

International career
| 2001–2004 | Italy U21 | 29 | (0) |
| 2004 | Italy U23 | 5 | (0) |
| 2001–2008 | Italy | 16 | (0) |

Managerial career
- 2019–2024: AC Milan (assistant)
- 2024–2025: Milan Futuro
- 2026–: Pro Vercelli
Medal record
Representing Italy
Men's Football
| Bronze medal – third place | 2004 | Team competition |
UEFA European Under-21 Championship
| Winner | 2004 |
- * Club domestic league appearances and goals

Daniele Bonera Cavaliere OMRI (Italian pronunciation: [daˈnjɛːle boˈnɛːra]; born 31 May 1981) is an Italian professional football coach and a former player who played as a centre back. He is the head coach of Serie C Group A club Pro Vercelli.

Prior to joining Spanish Villarreal in 2015, with whom he retired in 2019, he had previously played for Italian clubs Brescia, Parma, and in particular AC Milan, where he won several titles, including the 2010–11 Serie A and the 2006–07 UEFA Champions League.

At international level, he represented the Italy national team on 16 occasions; he also won the 2004 UEFA European Under-21 Championship with the Italy national under-21 football team, as well as a bronze medal at the 2004 Summer Olympics.

== Club career ==
=== Brescia ===
Bonera signed for Brescia in 1995 and played at the youth teams of Brescia until the end of 1998–99 season, where he made his first team debut for Brescia in 1999–2000. He played a total of 72 games in his three seasons with Brescia.

=== Parma ===
Bonera signed for Parma in July 2002. He played 32 Serie A games and scored a goal during his first season at Parma in 2002–03. In his following three seasons with Parma, he played 98 games of which 82 were in the Serie A. On 28 July 2006, Bonera moved to AC Milan in a €3.3 million transfer deal.

=== AC Milan ===
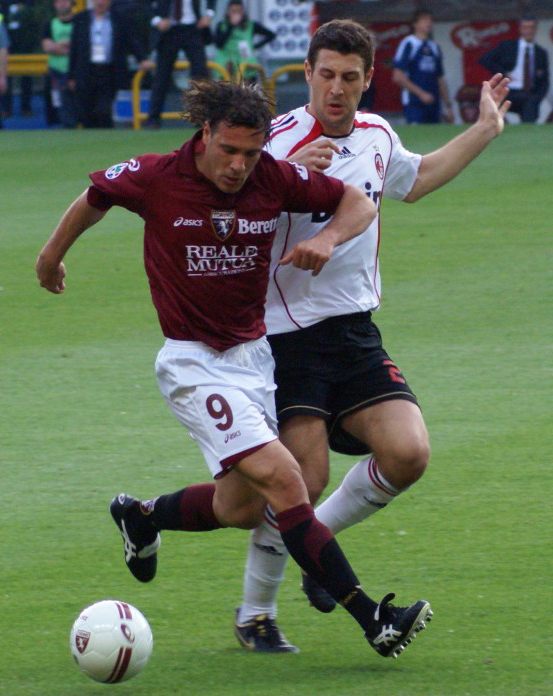
Bonera in action for AC Milan and chasing down the striker Roberto Muzzi of Torino

Bonera's UEFA Champions League came against Belgian side Anderlecht on 17 October 2006, in which he received a red card after receiving a second yellow in the 47th minute for what, in the referee's view, was petulantly kicking the ball away as Anderlecht waited to take a free kick. After struggling at right back, Bonera was moved to centre back after several defenders were injured, and after the acquisition of Massimo Oddo from Lazio in January, a natural right back. Bonera slotted in well at centre back, becoming one of Milan's better players. However, he struggled with a niggling injury in the second half of the 2008–09 season, joining Alessandro Nesta and Kakha Kaladze on the treatment table. In September 2009, he signed a contract extension which will last until 2013.

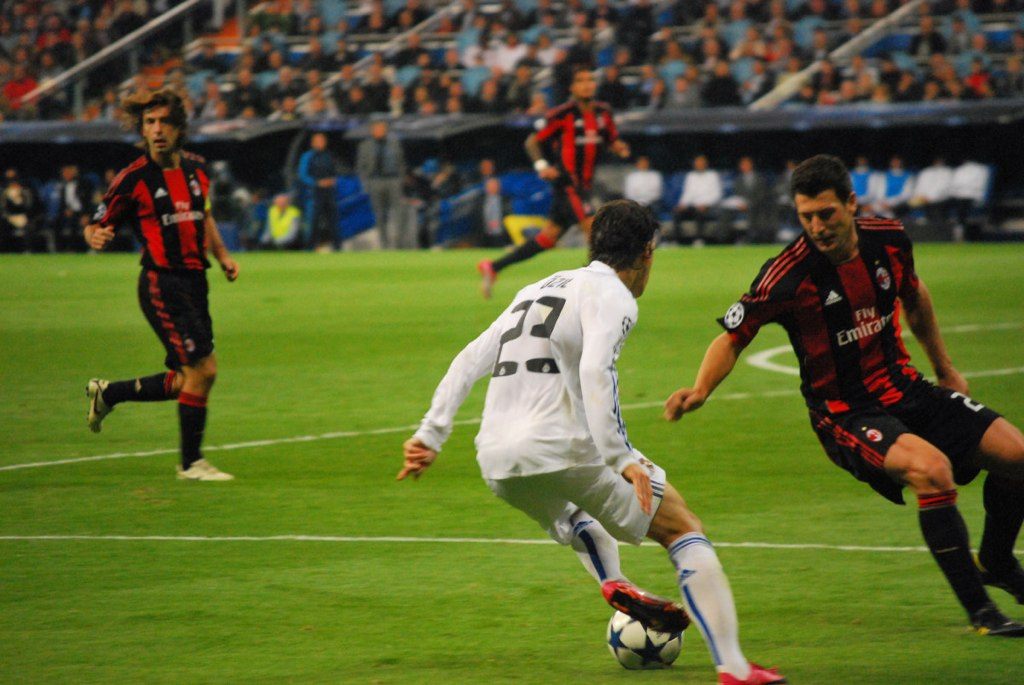
Mesut Özil and Daniele Bonera during the match between Real Madrid and Milan

After a ten-month injury lay-off, Bonera made a successful 45-minute comeback against Novara in the Coppa Italia on 13 January 2010. Because of Milan's great central defensive partnership of Alessandro Nesta and Thiago Silva, Bonera was deployed at his former position, right back. He slotted in well, playing much better in that position than when he first joined Milan. Because of this, Bonera became Milan's starting right back, but when Gianluca Zambrotta, Luca Antonini and Massimo Oddo all returned from injury, he lost his starting place in the position. When Nesta once again found himself on the treatment table, however, coach Leonardo chose Bonera to fill in for him in central defence.

On 23 May 2013, amid speculation of a move to Juventus, Bonera signed a new contract with Milan until 30 June 2015. During these two years, he mainly played as a backup player to first-choice centre-backs Philippe Mexès and Alex.

=== Villarreal ===
At the end of his deal with Milan in the summer of 2015, Bonera was released and was linked with a move to newly promoted Carpi, though he instead joined La Liga club Villarreal. On 9 July 2019, after spending four seasons at the club as a backup option, he announced his retirement.

== Coaching career ==
On 9 July 2019 Bonera was announced as part of Marco Giampaolo's new coaching staff at A.C. Milan, rejoining the club as an assistant coach.

He was confirmed also following the appointment of Stefano Pioli as new head coach. In November 2020, after both Pioli and assistant Giacomo Murelli were diagnosed positive for COVID-19, Bonera acted as interim head coach for the club on a temporary basis.

After five years as an assistant, on 27 June 2024 Bonera was unveiled as the inaugural head coach of Milan Futuro, AC Milan's reserve team. He was dismissed from his role on 24 February 2025, leaving the team deep in the relegation zone.

On 15 June 2026, Bonera was hired as the head coach by Serie C club Pro Vercelli, signing a two-season contract.

== International career ==
At youth level, Bonera was capped for both the 2002 and 2004 UEFA European Under-21 Championships. He also played at the 2000 Toulon Tournament. He was capped 34 times at U-21 international level.

Bonera has been capped 16 times for the Italian senior team between 2001 and 2008. After he made his senior debut under Giovanni Trapattoni on 5 September 2001, in a 1–0 win against Morocco, he made his non-friendly debut under Marcello Lippi in a 2006 FIFA World Cup qualifier.

He was called up to 2006 FIFA World Cup squad as one of the four emergency reserve players, but after Gianluca Zambrotta was confirmed to be fit, Bonera was excluded from the final 23-man squad and sent home.

After the 2006 World Cup, he was re-called for the first time under new manager Roberto Donadoni, ahead of the UEFA Euro 2008 qualifier against Scotland, a match scheduled for 28 March 2007. However, he had to withdraw due to injury. In October and November 2007, he was called up again. He played in a 2–0 friendly win against future 2010 FIFA World Cup hosts South Africa with an experimental Italy squad, and also came on as a substitute for Fabio Cannavaro in a 3–1 home win in a Euro 2008 qualifier against the Faroe Islands. He was not selected for Euro 2008.

After Marcello Lippi became Italy coach for the second time, Bonera was re-called in Lippi's first few matches, but was later left out of his squad due to injury. After the injury, Bonera was called up to the last friendly before the formal announcement of Italy's 2010 World Cup squad, against Cameroon. However, he failed to enter both the preliminary World Cup squad on 11 May and the training camp on 4–5 May.

== Style of play ==
Usually deployed as a centre-back, in his prime, Bonera was known for his pace, physical strength, and versatility as a defender, and was also capable of playing as a full back on either side of the pitch.

== Personal life ==
Daniele Bonera is married to Paola Bonera. Bonera has one child with his wife, a daughter, Talita Bonera.

On 13 October 2020, he tested positive for COVID-19.

== Career statistics ==
=== Club ===
Appearances and goals by club, season and competition
| Club | Season | League | | | Cup | | Continental | | Other | | Total | |
| Club | Season | Division | Apps | Goals | Apps | Goals | Apps | Goals | Apps | Goals | Apps | Goals |
|---|---|---|---|---|---|---|---|---|---|---|---|---|
| Brescia | 1999–2000 | Serie B | 5 | 0 | 0 | 0 | — | | — | | 5 | 0 |
| Brescia | 2000–01 | Serie A | 26 | 0 | 4 | 0 | — | | — | | 30 | 0 |
| Brescia | 2001–02 | Serie A | 29 | 0 | 4 | 0 | 4 (Note: Appearances in UEFA Europa League) | 0 | — | | 37 | 0 |
| Brescia | Total | | 60 | 0 | 8 | 0 | 4 | 0 | — | | 72 | 0 |
| Parma | 2002–03 | Serie A | 32 | 1 | 2 | 0 | 4 | 0 | — | | 38 | 1 |
| Parma | 2003–04 | Serie A | 24 | 0 | 0 | 0 | 5 | 0 | — | | 29 | 0 |
| Parma | 2004–05 | Serie A | 35 | 0 | 1 | 0 | 10 | 0 | — | | 46 | 0 |
| Parma | 2005–06 | Serie A | 23 | 0 | 0 | 0 | 0 | 0 | — | | 23 | 0 |
| Parma | Total | | 114 | 1 | 3 | 0 | 19 | 0 | — | | 136 | 1 |
| A.C. Milan | 2006–07 | Serie A | 25 | 0 | 5 | 0 | 6 (Note: Appearances in UEFA Champions League) | 0 | — | | 36 | 0 |
| A.C. Milan | 2007–08 | Serie A | 21 | 0 | 1 | 0 | 6 | 0 | 1 (Note: Appearances in Italian Supercup) | 0 | 29 | 0 |
| A.C. Milan | 2008–09 | Serie A | 18 | 0 | 0 | 0 | 4 | 0 | — | | 22 | 0 |
| A.C. Milan | 2009–10 | Serie A | 7 | 0 | 2 | 0 | 2 | 0 | — | | 11 | 0 |
| A.C. Milan | 2010–11 | Serie A | 16 | 0 | 1 | 0 | 3 | 0 | — | | 20 | 0 |
| A.C. Milan | 2011–12 | Serie A | 20 | 0 | 3 | 0 | 6 | 0 | 0 | 0 | 29 | 0 |
| A.C. Milan | 2012–13 | Serie A | 13 | 0 | 0 | 0 | 4 | 0 | — | | 17 | 0 |
| A.C. Milan | 2013–14 | Serie A | 16 | 0 | 0 | 0 | 4 | 0 | — | | 20 | 0 |
| A.C. Milan | 2014–15 | Serie A | 16 | 0 | 1 | 0 | — | | — | | 17 | 0 |
| A.C. Milan | Total | | 152 | 0 | 13 | 0 | 35 | 0 | 1 | 0 | 201 | 0 |
| Villarreal | 2015–16 | La Liga | 14 | 0 | 0 | 0 | 2 | 0 | — | | 16 | 0 |
| Villarreal | 2016–17 | La Liga | 6 | 0 | 1 | 0 | 3 | 0 | — | | 10 | 0 |
| Villarreal | 2017–18 | La Liga | 15 | 0 | 1 | 0 | 5 | 0 | — | | 21 | 0 |
| Villarreal | 2018–19 | La Liga | 5 | 0 | 3 | 0 | 3 | 0 | — | | 11 | 0 |
| Villarreal | Total | | 40 | 0 | 5 | 0 | 13 | 0 | — | | 58 | 0 |
| Career total | | | 366 | 1 | 29 | 0 | 71 | 0 | 1 | 0 | 467 | 1 |

=== International ===
Appearances and goals by national team and year
| National team | Year | Apps | Goals |
|---|---|---|---|
| Italy | 2001 | 1 | 0 |
| Italy | 2002 | 1 | 0 |
| Italy | 2003 | 1 | 0 |
| Italy | 2004 | 3 | 0 |
| Italy | 2005 | 4 | 0 |
| Italy | 2006 | 1 | 0 |
| Italy | 2007 | 2 | 0 |
| Italy | 2008 | 3 | 0 |
| Total | | 16 | 0 |

== Honours ==
AC Milan

- Serie A: 2010–11
- Supercoppa Italiana: 2011
- UEFA Champions League: 2006–07
- UEFA Super Cup: 2007
- FIFA Club World Cup: 2007

Italy

- UEFA European Under-21 Championship: 2004
- Summer Olympics bronze medal: 2004

Orders

- 5th Class / Knight: Cavaliere Ordine al Merito della Repubblica Italiana: 2004
