= Renato Olive =

Italian footballer

Personal information
- Full name: Renato Olive
- Date of birth: 6 April 1971 (age 55)
- Place of birth: Putignano, Italy
- Height: 1.76 m (5 ft 9 1/2 in)
- Position: Midfielder

Senior career*
Years	Team	Apps	(Gls)
1988–1989	A.C. Monopoli	12	(0)
1989–1992	Vis Pesaro	84	(0)
1993–1996	U.S. Lecce	88	(2)
1996–1997	A.S. Andria BAT	28	(5)
1997–1998	Perugia Calcio	15	(0)
1998	A.S. Andria BAT	17	(4)
1998–2000	Perugia Calcio	55	(8)
2000–2003	Bologna F.C. 1909	86	(5)
2003–2004	S.S.C. Napoli	17	(0)
2004–2005	Parma F.C.	8	(0)
2005–2006	Calcio Catania	1	(0)
2006–2007	Bologna F.C. 1909	1	(0)
2007–2008	Ravenna Calcio	27	(0)
- * Club domestic league appearances and goals as of 16 July 2009 ‡ National team caps and goals as of 16 July 2009

Renato Olive (born 6 April 1971) is an Italian former footballer.
