= Ibrahima Camara (footballer, born 1985) =

Sierra Leonean-born Guinean footballer

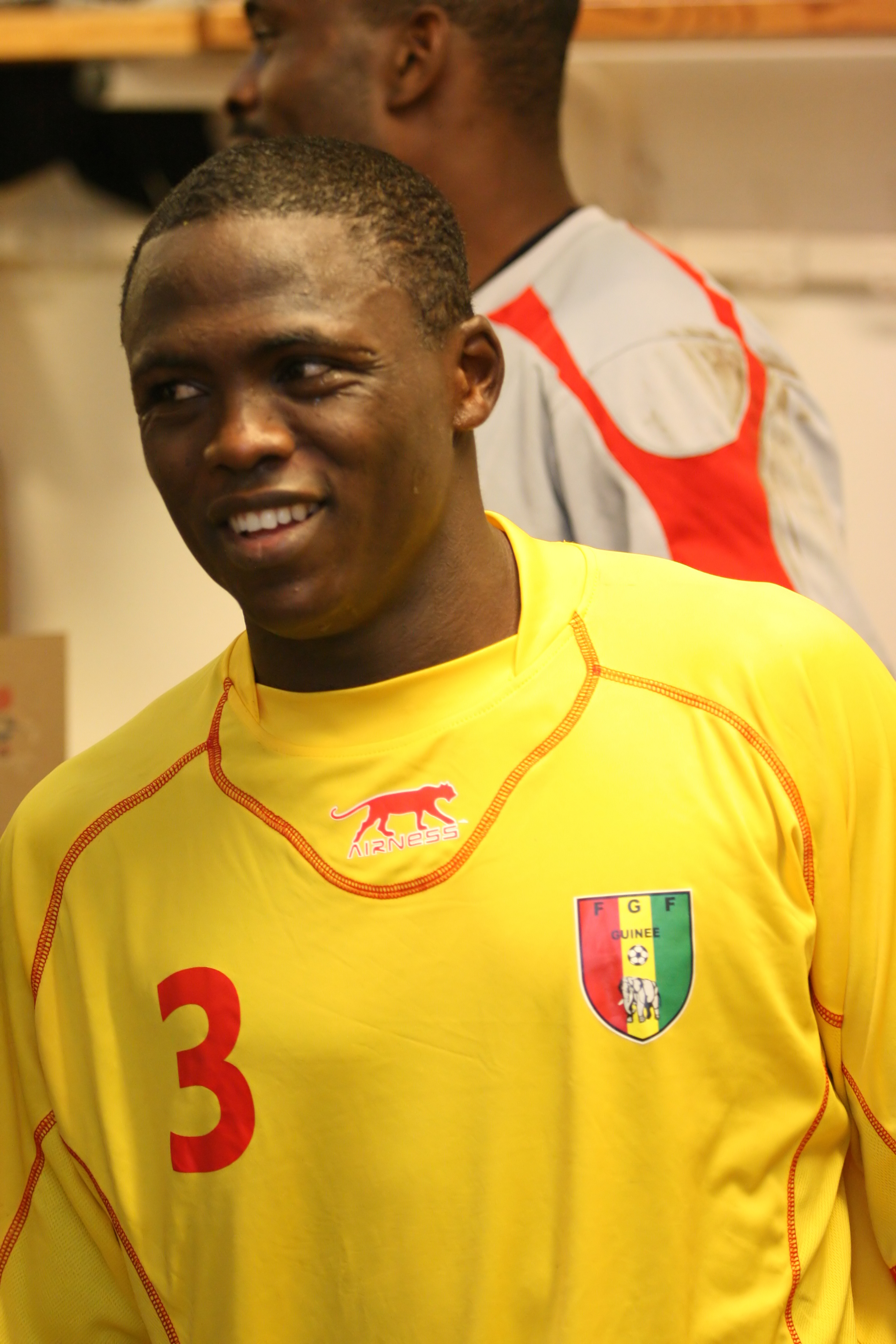

Personal information
- Full name: Ibrahima Sory Camara
- Date of birth: January 1, 1985 (age 41)
- Place of birth: Freetown, Sierra Leone
- Height: 1.69 m (5 ft 6 1/2 in)
- Positions: Defensive midfielder; defender

Youth career
- Parma

Senior career*
Years	Team	Apps	(Gls)
2003–2007	Parma	12	(0)
2006–2007	→ Le Mans (loan)	19	(0)
2007–2010	Le Mans	58	(0)
2010	→ Nantes (loan)	7	(0)
2010	AS Eupen	9	(0)
2012	COD Meknès		
2013	Porcelana		
2013–2015	Kaloum Star		
2016	Zemun	5	(0)
2016–2017	Kaloum Star		
2018	GFA		
2019	Kaloum Star		
2020	Thawi Watthana Samut Sakhon United	0	(0)

International career
2005–2011	Guinea	41	(1)
- * Club domestic league appearances and goals

Ibrahima Sory Camara (born January 1, 1985) is a retired professional footballer who played as a midfielder. Born in Sierra Leone, Camara represented Guinea internationally.

== Biography ==
Camara grew up in Freetown and moved to Guinea during the Sierra Leone civil war.

=== Club career ===
In the 2004–05 season, Camara featured for Parma AC's first team, making nine Serie A appearances and seven UEFA Cup appearances, which Parma finished as losing semi-finalists to champion CSKA Moscow.

In summer 2006, he was loaned to Le Mans FC, and turned to permanent move in summer 2007. On 1 February 2010 Le Mans 25-year-old defender played on loan for FC Nantes until the end of the season. In July 2010 he accepted an offer from Celtic F.C. to go on trial for a week, but failed to impress the Scottish club. Instead, he joined Belgian side K.A.S. Eupen.

By early 2015, he joined Serbian second-level side FK Zemun. He made five appearances in the 2015–16 Serbian First League.

=== International career ===
He was a member of the Guinea national team from 2005 to 2011, earning 40 caps.

Camara was the member of national team that finished top of the group stage, and lost in the quarter finals to Senegal in 2006 African Cup of Nations.

== Honours ==
Kaloum Star

- Guinée Championnat National: 2013–14
