= Tonino Sorrentino =

Italian footballer

Personal information
- Full name: Tonino Sorrentino
- Date of birth: March 12, 1985 (age 41)
- Place of birth: Melito Irpino, Italy
- Height: 1.81 m (5 ft 11 in)
- Position: Striker

Team information
- Current team: FC Südtirol

Senior career*
Years	Team	Apps	(Gls)
2003–2006	Parma	5	(2)
2004	→ Avellino (loan)	16	(2)
2005	→ Catanzaro (loan)	12	(0)
2006	→ Grosseto (loan)	13	(5)
2006–2008	Grosseto	24	(4)
2007	→ Perugia (loan)	11	(0)
2008	→ Cavese (loan)	7	(3)
2008–2010	Cavese	24	(4)
2010–2012	FC Südtirol	12	(1)
- * Club domestic league appearances and goals

Tonino Sorrentino (born 12 March 1985 in Melito Irpino) is an Italian former association footballer who last played as a forward for FC Südtirol.

== Career ==
Sorrentino played a game in UEFA Cup for Parma in 2003–04 season (as B squad player), before left on loan to hometown club Avellino. He scored twice in his European debut.

He returned to Parma in summer 2004, played three time in UEFA Cup, and 5 in Serie A. In 2005–06 season, he left for Catanzaro and Grosseto. At the end of season, Grosseto signed him in joint-ownership bid.

In 2007–08 season, he left on loan again, this time to Perugia and Cavese.

At the end of season, Grosseto bought all of the contract from Parma, but Sorrentino stayed with Cavese.

In January 2010 he left Cavese to join FC Südtirol.
