= Giuseppe Cardone =

Italian footballer

Personal information
- Date of birth: 3 March 1974 (age 52)
- Place of birth: Pavia, Italy
- Height: 1.83 m (6 ft 0 in)
- Position: Defender

Youth career
- Milan

Senior career*
| Years | Team | Apps | (Gls) |
| 1993–1996 | Milan | 0 | (0) |
| 1993–1994 | → Pavia (loan) | 18 | (0) |
| 1994–1995 | → Leffe (loan) | 31 | (3) |
| 1995–1996 | → Lucchese (loan) | 35 | (2) |
| 1996–1997 | Bologna | 24 | (0) |
| 1997–1999 | Milan | 19 | (0) |
| 1999–2000 | Parma | 0 | (0) |
| 1999 | → Vicenza (loan) | 14 | (1) |
| 1999–2000 | → Venezia (loan) | 19 | (0) |
| 2000–2001 | Vicenza | 27 | (0) |
| 2001–2003 | Piacenza | 41 | (2) |
| 2003 | → Parma (loan) | 13 | (1) |
| 2003–2008 | Parma | 45 | (1) |
| 2008 | Cesena | 15 | (0) |
| 2008–2009 | Modena | 10 | (0) |
| Total | | 311 | (10) |
- * Club domestic league appearances and goals

Giuseppe Cardone (born 3 March 1974) is a retired Italian footballer who played more than 300 games as a defender for a number of clubs in the Italian league.

== Career ==
Born in Pavia, Cardone played youth football with Lombardy top-flight club A.C. Milan. He was named in the first team squad for the 1992–93 Serie A season as a reserve, but did not play any senior games for the club. He was loaned out in turn to Pavia (in Serie C2) and then Leffe (in Serie C1), Lucchese (in Serie B).

In 1996, he was sold to fellow Serie A club Bologna F.C. 1909 in co-ownership deal. He returned to A.C. Milan in June 1997 for reported 2 billion Italian lire, and played 19 games for the club in the 1997–98 Serie A season. He did not play any games as Milan won the 1998–99 Serie A championship, and moved to Serie A club Vicenza Calcio halfway through that season via Parma. Milan signed Federico Giunti and sold Cardone to Parma. In 1999–2000 Serie A he was loaned to AC Venezia. In summer 2000 Vicenza signed Cardone from Parma for 2,200 million lire (€1,136,205) in another co-ownership deal, in 4-year contract.

=== Piacenza ===
When Vicenza were relegated following the 2000–01 Serie A, Cardone moved to newly promoted Serie A club Piacenza, as Piacenza acquired the other half of the registration rights from Parma, for 2,200 million lire (€1,136,205). Piacenza also acquired 50% registration rights of Matteo Guardalben from Parma, for 3,000 million lire (€1,549,370), as well as Nicola Mora and Matuzalém.

=== Parma return ===
During the 2002–03 Serie A season, he was re-signed by Parma, at first in temporary deal. In June 2003 Vicenza bought back Cardone and sold him back to Parma in July 2003. Roberto Vitiello also moved to Vicenza as part of the deal. Cardone missed the rest of the season in October 2006 due to serious injury, since then he never played for Parma.

=== Cesena & Modena ===
After playing 58 games in five years, Cardone moved to Serie B club A.C. Cesena during the 2007–08 Serie A season. He moved to Modena F.C. for the 2008–09 Serie B season, and ended his career after that season.
