= Alfonso De Lucia =

Italian footballer (born 1983)

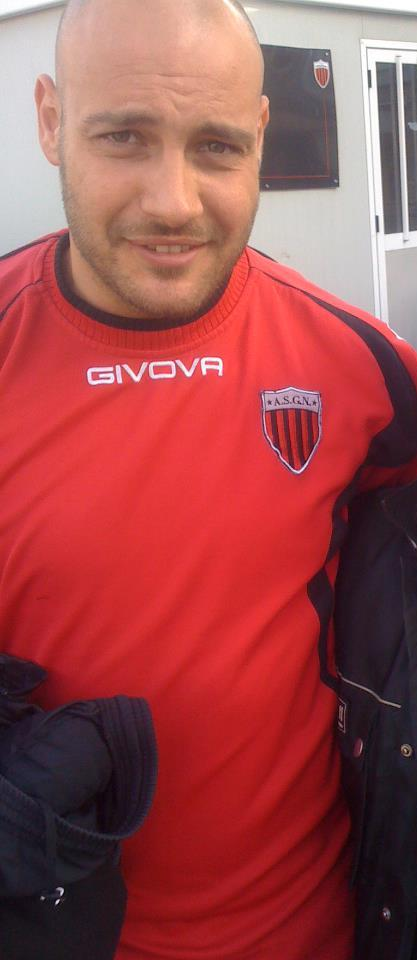

Personal information
- Date of birth: 12 November 1983 (age 42)
- Place of birth: Nola, Italy
- Height: 1.86 m (6 ft 1 in)
- Position: Goalkeeper

Youth career
- –1999: Napoli
- 1999–2002: Parma

Senior career*
Years	Team	Apps	(Gls)
2002–2007	Parma	18	(0)
2003–2004	→ Salernitana (loan)	11	(0)
2007–2014	Livorno	109	(0)
2013	→ Nocerina (loan)	11	(0)
2015	Monza	10	(0)

International career
2003	Italy U-20	1	(0)

Managerial career
- 2017–2021: Nola (president)
- 2021: Nola
- * Club domestic league appearances and goals

Alfonso De Lucia (born 12 November 1983) is an Italian football coach and a former player who played as a goalkeeper.

== Career ==
=== Parma ===
De Lucia was signed by Parma A.C. from S.S.C. Napoli, as part of the deal of Paolo Cannavaro.

De Lucia made his professional debut as a replacement for injured Cláudio Taffarel during a Serie A league game versus AC Milan on 30 March 2002, at the age of 18. The following season, De Lucia did not make any appearance, being later loaned out to Serie B side Salernitana for the 2003–04 season. After his return to Parma in July 2004, he served as a reserve for veteran keeper Luca Bucci, also managing to play 17 more games in three seasons.

=== Livorno ===
On 13 July 2007 De Lucia moved to Livorno. He played the 2007–08 season again as a reserve, this time behind Italian international Marco Amelia. After Livorno's relegation to Serie B, which persuaded Amelia to leave the club, De Lucia was promoted as first-choice goalkeeper and served as a regular in the 2008–09 campaign that ended in a prompt return to the top flight as playoff winners. In 2009–10, Livorno signed Francesco Benussi and Rubinho as backups for De Lucia. They played 16 games in Serie A.

De Lucia became the backup of Francesco Bardi in 2011–12 Serie B.

He was banned for 5 months in 2012 due to involvement in match-fixing scandal.

In January 2013, he was loaned to Nocerina.

In June 2013, he was banned for 6 months due to suing the chairman of Livorno without authorization. In 2014 his contract with the club was terminated.

=== Monza ===
In January 2015, De Lucia was signed by Lega Pro struggler Monza.

== Coaching career ==
Upon his retirement in 2017, he was chosen as president of his hometown club Nola, which was promoted into Serie D at the end of his first season in charge. On 20 August 2021, he was hired by the club as its head coach. He resigned on 17 November 2021 after a series of poor results.
