= Jorge Bolaño =

Colombian footballer (1977–2025)

Personal information
- Full name: Jorge Eladio Bolaño Correa
- Date of birth: 28 April 1977
- Place of birth: Santa Marta, Colombia
- Date of death: 6 April 2025 (aged 47)
- Place of death: Cúcuta, Colombia
- Height: 1.69 m (5 ft 7 in)
- Position: Midfielder

Senior career*
Years	Team	Apps	(Gls)
1993–1999	Atlético Junior	145	(10)
1999–2007	Parma	84	(0)
2002–2003	→ Sampdoria (loan)	0	(0)
2004	→ Lecce (loan)	16	(0)
2007–2009	Modena	54	(2)
2010–2012	Cúcuta Deportivo	58	(0)
Total		357	(12)

International career
1995–2003	Colombia	36	(1)
- * Club domestic league appearances and goals

Jorge Eladio Bolaño Correa (28 April 1977 – 6 April 2025) was a Colombian professional footballer who played as a midfielder.

Bolaño played for the Colombia national team and was a participant at the 1998 FIFA World Cup.

== Biography ==
Bolaño was born in Santa Marta, Colombia on 28 April 1977. His father Oscar Bolaño and his brothers Hugo and Oscar Jr also were footballers.

Bolaño died due to a heart attack in Cúcuta, Colombia, on 6 April 2025, at the age of 47.

== Career statistics ==
Scores and results list Colombia's goal tally first, score column indicates score after each Bolaño goal.

List of international goals scored by Jorge Bolaño
No.	Date	Venue	Opponent	Score	Result	Competition
1	11 July 1999	Estadio Feliciano Cáceres, Luque, Paraguay	Chile	1–0	3–2	1999 Copa América

== Honours ==
Junior

- Campeonato Colombiano: 1993,1995

Parma

- Coppa Italia: 2001–02

Sporting positions
Preceded by Carlos Valderrama	Atlético Junior captain 1996–1999	Succeeded by Marquinho
