= Tardini =

Tardini may refer to:

- Domenico Tardini (1888-1961), a former Cardinal Secretary of State
- Ennio Tardini (1879-1923), an Italian lawyer and former president of Parma F.C.
- Fanny Tardini-Vladicescu (1823-1908), a Romanian opera singer and stage actor
- Stadio Ennio Tardini, the stadium of Parma F.C. named after Ennio Tardini
