= USL Pro Iowa =

Soccer club based in Des Moines, Iowa

- Founded: 2019 (7 years ago)
- Stadium: Pro Iowa Stadium; Des Moines, Iowa
- Capacity: 6,300
- Owner: Kyle Krause
- League: USL Championship (men's); USL Super League (women's)
- Website: uslproiowa.com

USL Pro Iowa is a proposed professional soccer club based in Des Moines, Iowa. Owned by Kyle Krause, it was announced in 2019.

== History ==
USL Pro Iowa was founded in 2019 with a plan to use multiple government aid packages to secure land for, and construct, a soccer-specific stadium. The club was awarded franchise rights to play in the USL Championship in 2022, with a plan to commence play in 2024.

By 2024, the club's debut was indefinitely delayed as they sought additional subsidies to cover a $20 million funding gap for the stadium, which had then been priced at $95 million for its construction. Tax incentives to cover the funding gap were approved by Des Moines' municipal government in 2025, paving the way for the stadium's planned two-year construction to commence in 2026. Further reports then pushed that start date into 2027. As of mid-2026, design details were not yet finalized. At the earliest, USL Pro Iowa plans to field a men's team into the Championship in the 2029 season, and a women's team into the USL Super League in the 2028–29 season.

== Organization ==
USL Pro Iowa is owned by Kyle Krause, owner of the Des Moines Menace and Parma Calcio 1913.
