= Calisto Tanzi =

Italian fraudster (1938–2022)

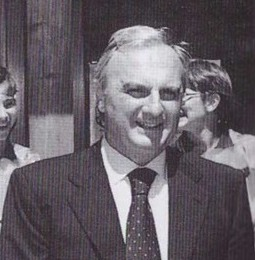
- Tanzi in 1996
- Born: 17 November 1938; Collecchio, Parma, Emilia-Romagna, Italy
- Died: 1 January 2022 (aged 83); Parma, Italy
- Employer: Parmalat
- Criminal charges: Fraud, fraudulent bankruptcy, criminal association
- Penalty: Eight years imprisonment (final), 18 years imprisonment (appealed), nine years imprisonment (appealed)

Calisto Tanzi (17 November 1938 – 1 January 2022) was an Italian businessman. He founded Parmalat in 1961, after dropping out of college. Parmalat collapsed in 2003 with a €14bn ($20bn; £13bn) hole in its accounts in what remains Europe's biggest bankruptcy. In 2008 Tanzi was found to have embezzled an estimated €800 million from the company, and was jailed for fraud. Although sentenced to up to 18 years in prison, Tanzi served just over two years in jail and then was placed under house arrest.

== Trials and imprisonment ==
=== Parmalat fraud ===
In December 2008, Tanzi was convicted by a Milan court and sentenced to 10 years in prison for fraud. Tanzi appealed the sentence but the appeals court upheld it in May 2010. The Corte di Cassazione reduced it to eight years and one month, after which Tanzi was imprisoned on 5 May 2011.

=== Parmalat bankruptcy ===
On 9 December 2010, a court in Parma found Tanzi guilty of fraudulent bankruptcy and criminal association and sentenced him to 18 years in prison. Tanzi appealed the sentence and the appeal trial started in December 2011 in Bologna.

=== Parmatour bankruptcy ===
On 20 December 2011, Tanzi was sentenced to a further nine years and two months for the Parmatour bankruptcy.

=== Parma bankruptcy ===
Tanzi was fined €10,000 and given a six-month ban from football for false accounting of Parma in the 2002–03 season.

== Artwork seizure ==
In 2001, according to Forbes, he was listed as a billionaire with a net worth of roughly $1.3 billion.

In December 2009, the Italian authorities announced that they had seized nineteen works of art belonging to Tanzi, which had been concealed at the houses of his friends. The works of art were said to be worth more than €100 million and included paintings and drawings by Picasso, Monet and van Gogh. Tanzi had denied owning any hidden works of art. Parma Prosecutor Gerardo Laguardia, said that officials had acted quickly to seize the pictures after discovering that they had been offered for sale. The authorities said that Stefano Strini, Tanzi's son-in-law, was being investigated for allegedly handling the artwork. On 29 October 2019, Tanzi's art collection was auctioned off in Milan. “Rediscovered Treasures: Impressionists and Modern Masterpieces from a Private Collection” included artworks by such artists as Balla, Gauguin, Cézanne, Kandinsky, Matisse, Modigliani and van Gogh.

== Honours ==
Tanzi was appointed Cavaliere del Lavoro in 1984 and Cavaliere di Gran Croce Ordine al Merito della Repubblica Italiana in 1999. Both honours, however, were withdrawn on grounds of 'indignity' in the wake of the Parmalat affair — yet before the final bankruptcy conviction — by President Giorgio Napolitano.

== Personal life and death ==
Tanzi died of pneumonia in a Parma hospital on the New Year's Day of 2022, at the age of 83.
