= Storci =

Italian pasta processing equipment manufacturer

Storci S.p.A.
- Company type: Private
- Industry: Pasta
- Founded: 1991; 34 years ago
- Founder: Anzio Storci
- Headquarters: Collecchio, Parma, Italy
- Website: storci.com

Storci S.p.A. is an Italian pasta processing equipment manufacturer. The company is based in Collecchio, Parma, Italy.

Storci manufactures equipment and machinery which produces different types of pasta such as dry pasta, fresh pasta, ready meals, gluten-free pasta, and special pasta. The company works in partnership with Fava S.p.A, based in Cento, Italy, and manufactures industrial lines for the production of dry pasta and couscous.

It has a market share of around forty percent worldwide. According to another estimate, more than a thousand Storci plants are in use worldwide with a market share of forty-five percent.

== History ==
Storci was founded by Anzio Storci in 1991 in Collecchio, Parma, Italy.

In 1994, Storci S.p.A. formed an alliance and partnership with Fava S.p.A.

In 2003, the company moved its workshop to a 1,500 square meters facility in Lemignano. Later, in 2004, Storci moved their company headquarters and are now based in Lemignano.

In 2016, after ten years of research, they found a method to obtain synthetic vegetable leather from the skin and residue of apple. After the success, the company started the industrial production of pellemela.
