= Giuseppe Ferrari =

Giuseppe Ferrari may refer to:

- Giuseppe Ferrari (philosopher) (1812–1876), Italian philosopher
- Giuseppe Ferrari (painter) (1840–1905), Italian painter
- Giuseppe Carlo Ferrari (1910–1987), Italian footballer and coach
