= Centro Sportivo di Collecchio =

- Interactive map of Centro Sportivo di Collecchio
- Address: Strade Nazionale Est; 43044 Collecchio PR
- Location: Collecchio; Emilia–Romagna, Italy
- Coordinates: 44.754°N 10.230°E
Owner
Eventi Sportivi S.p.A. (parent company of Parma F.C.)	(?–2015)
Parma Calcio 1913	(2018–)
- Type: Football training facility

Construction
- Opened: 1996

Website
- Grounds

The Centro Sportivo di Collecchio, or Collecchio Sports Centre in English, is Parma Calcio 1913's training ground and administrative headquarters. It is located in Collecchio, a comune 15 kilometres south-west of the Stadio Ennio Tardini, the club's stadium. It opened in 1996 and replaced the old training ground in the centre of Parma: Parco Ferrari, just south of the stadium and 200 metres due east of the Cittadella di Parma.

The first team trains and plays many of their home friendly matches at the complex; the main exception to this is the club's season opener, which is used to present the squad for the coming year. Parma's youth teams also train at Collecchio. It also acts as the club's headquarters.

In 2018, the refounded Parma Calcio 1913 acquired the centre from the administrator of Eventi Sportivi S.p.A., the parent company of Parma F.C. for about €3 million.

== Playing facilities ==
The centre has seven pitches (five natural grass, one synthetic grass pitch and one smaller indoor pitch opened in February 2014). One of the five pitches has a 1,200-seat grandstand. Other facilities include changing rooms, two gyms, two physiotherapy rooms, medical offices and a swimming pool.

== Administrative headquarters ==
On 16 December 2011, it was announced that the club's headquarters would be relocated to Collecchio from the Stadio Ennio Tardini once construction of a new 2,150-square metre office was completed. Work was scheduled to begin in 2012 and completed by the summer of 2013. The €6.5 million cost was to be financed by a twenty-year mortgage loan. The foundations had been laid by March 2012 and most of the exterior was in place by the end of the July. The majority of the glass façade was in place in mid-August. In a press conference on 5 September, club chairman Tommaso Ghirardi announced that the new offices should be ready in the next 10 days or so and that the building should be complete in its entirety after a further month.

The complex includes several offices, meeting rooms, the media room, a restaurant, ten double rooms and two suites.
