= Enrico Bondi =

Italian administrator

- Born: October 5, 1934 (age 91); Arezzo, Kingdom of Italy
- Occupation: CEO

Enrico Bondi (born 5 October 1934 in Arezzo) is an Italian administrator.

Although he graduated in chemistry, Bondi has extensive experience of re-structuring companies in financial ill-health. Most notably, he took charge of Parmalat and its subsidiaries during the crisis that followed the Crac Parmalat in the early 2000s. This was a period which gave rise to a debt of €14bn. Bondi had been the CEO of Parmalat until 2011 when the company was acquired by Lactalis.

On 11 October 2006, Bondi became chairman of Parma F.C., a position he held until the club's sale to Tommaso Ghirardi in January 2007.

He was nominated government commissioner for the spending review by the Monti Cabinet on 30 April 2012.
