= Riccardo Fainardi =

Italian painter (1865–1959)

Riccardo Fainardi (1865–1959) was an Italian painter, sculptor and interior designer, noted for his contributions to buildings. He was born in Collecchio, Parma and died in Gaiano, Parma. Notable works include the Chiesa di Fornovo Taro in Fornovo di Taro, Parma in 1882 and the Chiesa di Sant'Andrea of Capri in 1900.

== Biography ==
When still a "poverty-stricken painter", Fainardi was given the job of designing and supervising the construction of the Chiesa di Sant'Andrea on Capri by a German banker, Hugo Andreae, who owned a villa there. Soon after the church was completed, Andreae discovered that Fainardi had been having an affair with his young wife, Emma, and took her back to Germany. However, soon afterwards, in 1901, he died of shock, or by suicide and Emma moved back to Capri, having inherited his villa there, and married Fainardi. The couple renamed the villa "Villa Capricorno", but found it too painful to continue living there and subsequently left the island. Emma died in 1924.

Fainardi died on 24 December 1959.
