= Classic Football Shirts =

Sportswear retailer

- Company type: Private limited company
- Industry: Retail, E-commerce, Apparel, Sports memorabilia
- Founded: 12 June 2006 (as Classic Football Company Limited) in Manchester, England
- Founder: Matthew Dale; Doug Bierton; Gary Bierton (joined later)
- Headquarters: Hyde, Greater Manchester (Registered office); Manchester (Operations HQ), United Kingdom
- Number of locations: UK: Manchester, London; US: New York City, Miami, Los Angeles (Retail stores)
- Area served: Worldwide (online)
- Key people: Doug Bierton (CEO), Cormac Barry (Executive Chairman)
- Products: Football shirts (classic, vintage, match-worn, current season), Apparel
- Revenue: ▲£24.47 million (Year ending 30 June 2023)
- Operating income: ▲£5.57 million (Year ending 30 June 2023)
- Net income: ▲£4.52 million (Year ending 30 June 2023)
- Owner: Founders, Employees, The Chernin Group (minority stake)
- Number of employees: approx. 123 (as of late 2024/early 2025)
- Parent: Classic Football Company Limited (ultimate parent)
- Subsidiaries: Classic Football Shirts Limited
- Website: www.classicfootballshirts.co.uk

Classic Football Shirts is a UK-based retailer specializing in authentic classic, rare, vintage, and contemporary football shirts and related apparel. Founded in Manchester in 2006 by Matthew Dale and Doug Bierton, the company operates an extensive e-commerce platform alongside physical retail stores in the UK and the United States.

== History ==
Classic Football Shirts was established in 2006 by Matthew Dale and Doug Bierton, who had recently finished university.

The company expanded its operations, moving into a warehouse facility near Manchester's Etihad Stadium in 2011 and later, in 2020, to a larger 75,000 sq ft headquarters and warehouse in the city. Following several pop-up shops, the first permanent retail store opened in Manchester's Barton Arcade in 2018, followed by a store in London.

In 2023, Classic Football Shirts explored the United States market by opening temporary pop-up stores in Miami, New York City, and Los Angeles. This led to significant developments in 2024, beginning with the company securing its first external investment in May: US$38.5 million (£30.5 million) in growth equity from The Chernin Group (TCG). This investment aimed to support global expansion, in North America ahead of the 2026 FIFA World Cup. Cormac Barry was appointed Executive Chairman at the same time. Permanent US stores were subsequently opened in New York City (Canal Street) in May 2024 and Los Angeles (North Fairfax Avenue) in October 2024.

In September 2024, the company announced additional investors with connections to sports and media, including ventures associated with Rob McElhenney and Alex Morgan, as well as Wasserman Ventures.

== Products and Operations ==
Operations are based at its Manchester headquarters and warehouse. As part of its marketing strategy, the company maintains an active social media presence and has engaged in front-of-shirt sponsorship agreements with football clubs, including Burnley F.C. for the 2022–23 season and Parma Calcio 1913 for the 2023–24 season.

== Market Impact and Reception ==
Classic Football Shirts operates within the global football apparel market, a sector valued at approximately US$6.49 billion in 2024. The company is recognised as a significant retailer in the growing sub-market for vintage and retro football shirts. This market growth has been linked to nostalgia and fashion trends such as 'blokecore', where football shirts are incorporated into everyday streetwear. The company's expansion into the US market has been noted by media outlets in the context of increasing football popularity in North America.
