= Villa Paveri-Fontana, Collecchio =

Villa in Collecchio, Italy

Coordinates: 44.7546°N 10.2171°E

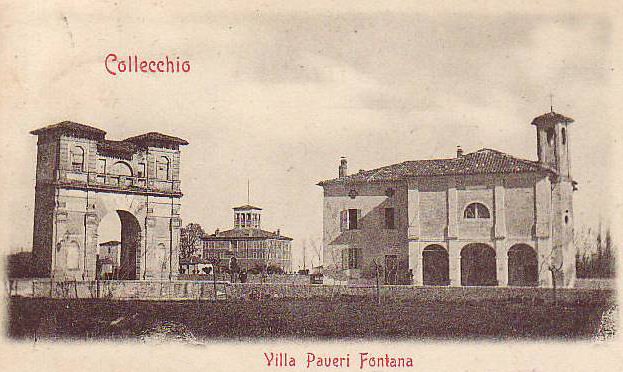
1910 photograph showing from left to right, the Arco del Bargello, the villa in the distance, and the oratory

The Villa Paveri Fontana, also called Villa Dalla Rosa Prati or Santucci Fontanelli, is a rural aristocratic palace located just outside of the town of Collecchio in the Province of Parma, Italy.

The villa, originally built in the 15th century, underwent refurbishment in the 17th century. The house is notable for its interior quadratura and trompe-l'œil decorations by Ferdinando Galli-Bibbiena. Near the villa a small former oratory (Oratorio della Madonna di Loreto) was erected in 1709. The grounds also have fanciful decorative architecture, such as a Baroque-style triumphal arch (Arco del Bargello) and a Triton fountain. The villa putatively holds the town library.
