= Dominik Drobnič =

Slovenian footballer (born 2007)

Personal information
- Date of birth: 5 April 2007 (age 19)
- Place of birth: Slovenia
- Height: 1.95 m (6 ft 5 in)
- Position: Defender

Team information
- Current team: Parma
- Number: 72

Youth career
- –2023: Bravo
- 2023–: Parma

Senior career*
Years	Team	Apps	(Gls)
2026–	Parma	2	(0)

International career^{‡}
2022	Slovenia U15	4	(0)
2022	Slovenia U16	3	(0)
2023–2024	Slovenia U17	11	(0)
2024	Slovenia U18	2	(0)
2024–2026	Slovenia U19	14	(0)
- * Club domestic league appearances and goals ‡ National team caps and goals as of 31 March 2026

Dominik Drobnič (born 5 April 2007) is a Slovenian professional footballer who plays as a defender for Parma.

== Early life ==
Drobnič was born on 5 April 2007. Born in Slovenia, he is a native of Ljubljana, Slovenia and is the older brother of Slovenian footballer Matic Drobnič.

== Club career ==
As a youth player, Drobnič joined the youth academy of Bravo. Following his stint there, he joined the youth academy of Italian side Parma in 2023 at the age of sixteen. Ahead of the 2024–25 season, he was promoted to the club's under-21 team, where he was regarded to have established himself as a regular starter while playing for them.

Subsequently, he was promoted to their senior team in 2026. On 29 August 2026, he debuted for the Gialloblu during a 0–2 away loss to Juventus in the league.

== International career ==
Drobnič is a Slovenia youth international and has represent the country internationally at under-15, under-16, under-17, under-18, and under-19 level. Altogether, he made four appearances and scored zero goals while playing for the Slovenia national under-15 football team and three appearances and scored zero goals while playing for the Slovenia national under-16 football team.

During the autumn of 2023 and the spring of 2024, he played for the Slovenia national under-17 football team for 2024 UEFA European Under-17 Championship qualification. Two years later, he played for the Slovenia national under-19 football team for 2026 UEFA European Under-19 Championship qualification.

== Style of play ==
Drobnič plays as a defender and is left-footed. Italian news website MondoPrimavera wrote in 2026 that he "is a left-footed central defender with an imposing build (1.94 m tall). Thanks to his size, he stands out for his dominance in aerial duels and physical anticipation. Being a natural left-footer, he is invaluable in building from the back, ensuring clean build-ups both on the left-center of a back four and as a central defender in a back three".
