= Sant'Andrea, Capri =

Church in Capri, Italy

Coordinates: 40°32′43.25″N 14°14′6.52″E

Chiesa di Sant'Andrea is a church in the island of Capri, Italy, near the Marina Piccola in the south. It was built in 1900 for the local fishermen. The site which the church lies on formerly contained a watch tower which was used as a lookout post for invading Saracen pirates. The church was designed by the painter Riccardo Fainardi, and funded by German banker Hugo Andreae and his wife, Emma.

Capri.net says of the interior, "The pronaos of the Church is supported by two columns. The central apse stands in the very same position once occupied by the old watchtower. The central altar is embellished by a triptych representing the crucifixion of Saint Andrew. In one of the lateral passes, there is an altar dedicated to the Madonna of Pompei and a spiral staircase leading up to the organ."

Andreae together with the businessman Moritz von Bernus, also founded the German Evangelical Church on the island in the year 1899, Capri being a popular holiday destination for Germans and also having a sizeable German population.
