= Parmalat bankruptcy timeline =

Corporate scandal

In 2003, multinational Italian dairy and food corporation Parmalat collapsed with a €14 billion ($20bn; £13bn) hole in its accounts, in what remains Europe's biggest bankruptcy. The Parmalat bankruptcy greatly affected football team AC Parma, in which Parmalat was the major shareholder.

== 2003 ==
=== December 2003 ===
December 19 – Bank of America states that Parmalat does not hold nearly $5B in liquid assets for the company as Parmalat reported in September 2003. Bank of America disavows the document released by Parmalat's Bonlat Financing Corp unit claiming over €4B are being stored by an affiliate of the company in the Cayman Islands. The bank promptly notifies Grant Thornton that no such account exists. The Milan Stock Exchange halts trading of Parmalat shares.

December 23 – Bank of America lawyers claim the document proclaiming Bank of America holds Parmalat assets is a forgery.

December 24 – Parmalat files bankruptcy. S&P rates Bank of America's exposure as "significant, but manageable". Investigators put Parmalat's debts as high as $12.8B.

== 2004 ==
=== January 2004 ===
January 12 – Luca Sala, former head of Bank of America's Italian corporate finance division, denies wrongdoing and maintains that he did not aid Parmalat executives in sustaining the price of Parmalat securities despite knowing the state of its finances. Prosecutors believe the executives constructed a series of shell companies and used forged documents to conceal losses and divert cash. Sala was linked to a $500M Parmalat bond issued by Bank of America and other banks.

January 26 – Hoefer & Arnet stock analyst Dick Bove rates Bank of America's stock as a strong buy, but warns that "very disturbing signs are emerging that Bank of America’s internal discipline has broken down". He believes that the bank's estimated $274M exposure to the scandal, $244 million of which is locked in loans and letters of credit, could have been prevented.

January 29 – Bank of America files a petition to close the Irish financing unit of Parmalat, known as Eurofood IFSC Ltd. "to protect its interests as a creditor to Eurofood". Bank of America is owed more than $3.5M by Eurofood at this time.

=== February 2004 ===
February 24 – For the first time, Bank of America, along with Citigroup, Morgan Stanley, Deutsche Bank, UBS AG, and several Italian banks, becomes a formal target of the Italian investigation surrounding the Parmalat bankruptcy.

February 24 – Three of Parmalat's U.S. affiliates, Parmalat USA Corp., Farmland Dairies, and Milk Products of Alabama, file for bankruptcy protection with combined assets of $414.4M and combined debt of $316.5M.

February 27 – Luca Sala admits to and offers to forfeit most of the $27M he misappropriated in a kickback scheme at Parmalat, but still maintains the bank was unaware of his improprieties. The SEC travels to Italy to assist Italian officials in deciphering American involvement in the collapse of Parmalat.

=== March 2004 ===
March 5 – Parmalat seeks $618 million from U.S. banks to recover assets from creditors under an Italian claw back law known as "revocatoria". This law enables insolvent companies to seize assets counterparts received during transactions with them, going back up to five years. At this point, Parmalat's debt is believed to be upwards of $17 billion.

March 18 – An Italian judge is asked by prosecutors to order 29 executives and three companies to stand trial on four separate charges. Three executives from Bank of America, Luca Sala, Luis Moncada, and Antonio Luzi, are included in the order. In addition to Bank of America, the Italian affiliates of Deloitte & Touche and Grant Thornton are also ordered to court. Prosecutors believe Bank of America should have been aware of the financial problems at Parmalat when it issued €1.2B, or nearly $1.5B, in Parmalat bonds over the preceding seven years. A fast-track trial was sought, but an Italian court denied expediting proceedings.

=== May 2004 ===
May 24 – Creditors file a $10B class-action lawsuit against former auditors and banks of Parmalat in the U.S. District Court in Manhattan. Charges include "fraudulent activity and giving misleading information". Hermes, a British pension fund holding more than 2% of Parmalat shares, and Deminor, a European shareholder rights group representing Parmalat bondholders, headed the suit.

=== October 2004 ===
October 7 – Parmalat sues Bank of America for $10B in damages, as it had in July 2004 against Citigroup and in August 2004 against Deloitte & Touche and Grant Thornton.

October 19 – Parmalat investors name Bank of America as a defendant in an $8B class-action suit in New York. A previous class-action suit filed on behalf of Parmalat investors was joined into this new suit.

October 29 – Bank of America asks an Italian court to include itself as a co-plaintiff in the case against 32 executives, auditors, and lenders in a Milan courtroom, despite the ongoing investigation into Bank of America's involvement in the Parmalat collapse. Bank of America denies any wrongdoing in the matter and is considering filing its own countersuit against Parmalat.

=== December 2004 ===
December 17 – Bank of America, still being sued for a combined $18B by Parmalat and its investors, is named as one of Parmalat's creditors to the tune of $163M. This means Bank of America can take part, as all creditors can, in a debt-for-equity swap under Parmalat's restructuring plan. This makes Bank of America a shareholder in the company when it emerges from bankruptcy.

== 2005 ==
=== January 2005 ===
January 25 – An Italian court bars Bank of America from claiming damages resulting from Parmalat's bankruptcy. The bank may still file as a damaged civil party if a future trial occurs.

=== July 2005 ===
July 14 – The $8B class-action lawsuit brought in Manhattan federal court on behalf of Parmalat investors is dismissed. Judge Lewis Kaplan's 74-page decision asserts that Bank of America did not know Parmalat was in financial trouble and thus could not profit off the company's downturn. The judge did not dismiss claims included in the suit against Citigroup, Banca Nazionale del Lavoro SpA, or Credit Suisse First Boston.

=== August 2005 ===
August 2 – Luca Sala is arrested by Italian authorities for his involvement in the bankruptcy when he was head of Bank of America's Italian corporate banking division and after he became a consultant at Parmalat in 2003.

August 9 – A U.S. judge rules Parmalat can proceed with its $10B suit against Bank of America on charges of aiding and abetting break of fiduciary duty and looting of the company. The suit was propelled forward despite Bank of America's protest that a company cannot be sued for fraud by the company perpetrating the fraud in question. Judge Lewis Kaplan dismissed the protest because the precedent called into question was an application of New York law.

August 18 – After 16 days, Luca Sala is released from pre-trial custody in Italy after it was determined that he could no longer tamper with evidence. The current charges against him stem from $63.5M in siphoned funds from Parmalat to private accounts. Sala denies stealing the money, instead claiming he earned some of it in commissions from insurance and private-placement contracts he handled for Parmalat.

=== November 2005 ===
November 28 – Three Cayman Islands-based companies sue Bank of America for its role in the collapse of Parmalat. Charges include financial improprieties including fraud, negligent misrepresentation, & breach of fiduciary duty. The suit claims Bank of America generated millions of dollars in fees and interest when it orchestrated financial transactions designed to disguise Parmalat's insolvency. The claim seeks nearly $1B from Bank of America, Deloitte Touche Tohmatsu & Grant Thornton.

=== December 2005 ===
December 20 – Bank of America is granted the ability to join other plaintiffs in an Italian lawsuit against Parmalat. This is possible due to the condition that Bank of America is entitled to treatment as a damaged party in any civil suit as set forth on 2005-01-25.

== 2006 ==
=== February 2006 ===
February 10 – After amending the lawsuit brought by Parmalat investors against former auditors and banks of the bankrupt company, Judge Lewis Kaplan gives the OK for Bank of America to be sued for its role in helping Parmalat commit securities fraud. The suit centers around a $300M loan made to Parmalat's Brazilian subsidiary and a 2001 change to an insurance policy for Parmalat Venezuela. Bank of America states that it "believed it was dealing with a strong, honest, and profitable company and had no knowledge of the fraud perpetrated by Parmalat and its senior management".

=== March 2006 ===
March 30 – Judge Lewis Kaplan of the Southern District of New York has ruled Bank of America may seek up to $1B in damages from Parmalat. The ruling allows Bank of America to claim Parmalat committed fraud, misrepresentation, conspiracy, and other illegal acts.

== 2007 ==
=== March 2007 ===
March 26 – Some of the counterclaims brought by Bank of America against Parmalat, including racketeering and North Carolina deceptive-trade practices laws are dismissed by Judge Lewis Kaplan in New York federal district court. "Bank of America’s counterclaims for fraud, negligent misrepresentation, securities fraud, and civil conspiracy…will go forward", stated Bank of America spokesman Timothy Gilles, "…and they are significantly more important than the secondary claims that were dismissed."

=== June 2007 ===
June 22 – U.S. Federal Bankruptcy Court in New York grants a permanent injunction against claims by creditors, including Bank of America. It came as a defeat for bondholders and their $868M in claims. The injunction will not apply outside the U.S. or to any Parmalat affiliates or subsidiaries not restructuring under Italian bankruptcy law.

June 25 – Bank of America representatives in Milan, Italy release a statement claiming the bank lost $450M from the Parmalat collapse.

=== July 2007 ===
July 6 – An Italian judge ordered Bank of America, Citigroup, Morgan Stanley, Deutsche Bank, and UBS AG to stand trial in January 2008. The specific charges against Bank of America are in connection with an Italian law through which a company can be charged for not having proper governance controls in place to prevent illegal actions by employees. Specifically, Bank of America's accountability is held to its inability to prevent three former employees from market rigging.

July 27 – A U.S. Federal bankruptcy judge in New York dismisses claims by foreign investors that the bank knew the Italian company was in financial dire straits and profited from that information. This decision effectively limits the lawsuits to Parmalat investors who reside in the United States. This verdict also is extensible to Citigroup Inc., Deloitte Touche Tohmatsu and Grant Thornton. The $10B suit brought by former Parmalat CEO Enrico Bondi is still being disputed at this time.

=== August 2007 ===
August 10 – U.S. District Judge Lewis Kaplan in New York dismisses suits against Bank of America, Credit Suisse, and Grant Thornton brought by two U.S. subsidiaries of Parmalat, Parmalat USA Corp and Farmland Dairies. This extends the former ruling against Parmalat to include its domestic subsidiaries.

August 12 – U.S. District Judge Lewis Kaplan subsequently dismisses the lawsuit brought against Bank of America by Parmalat investors. Kaplan stated that a Supreme Court ruling earlier in the year "made plain that investors must show reliance upon a defendant’s own deceptive conduct before that defendant, otherwise a secondary actor, may be found primarily liable" and the suit failed to meet that standard.

== 2009 ==
=== January 2009 ===
January 13 – Bank of America is acquitted in an Italian court of all charges drawn from activities prior to April 2002. There was not a law prior to this time which dictated the administrative responsibilities of a corporation. Charging Bank of America for actions (or lack thereof) prior to enactment of the law would thus be a case of ex post facto.

=== July 2009 ===
July 28 – Bank of America agrees to pay $100M to settle the original $10B lawsuit brought by Parmalat, its subsidiaries, and its investors. The settlement contains both a cash and non-cash component. Bank of America admitted no wrongdoing in settling the case.

=== October 2009 ===
October 2 – Bank of America provides settlement payment to Parmalat in the amount of US$98.5M.
