= Vicenzi Group =

Italian food company

Vicenzi SpA
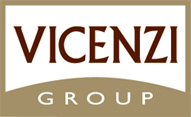
- Trade name: Vicenzi Group
- Industry: Food
- Founded: 1905
- Founder: Matilde Vicenzi
- Number of employees: 354
- Website: vicenzi.it

Vicenzi S.p.A., also known as Vicenzi Group, is an Italian food company based in San Giovanni Lupatoto. It was founded in 1905 by Matilde Vicenzi.

Vicenzi produces a range of biscuits and cakes under its brands Matilde Vicenzi, Grisbì, and Mr. Day. With four production facilities in Europe, the company exports products to about 70 countries and offers private-label production services.

In 2005 Vicenzi bought from Parmalat the bakery plant of Nusco, opened in 1984.
