= Collecchio =

- Comune
- Comune di Collecchio
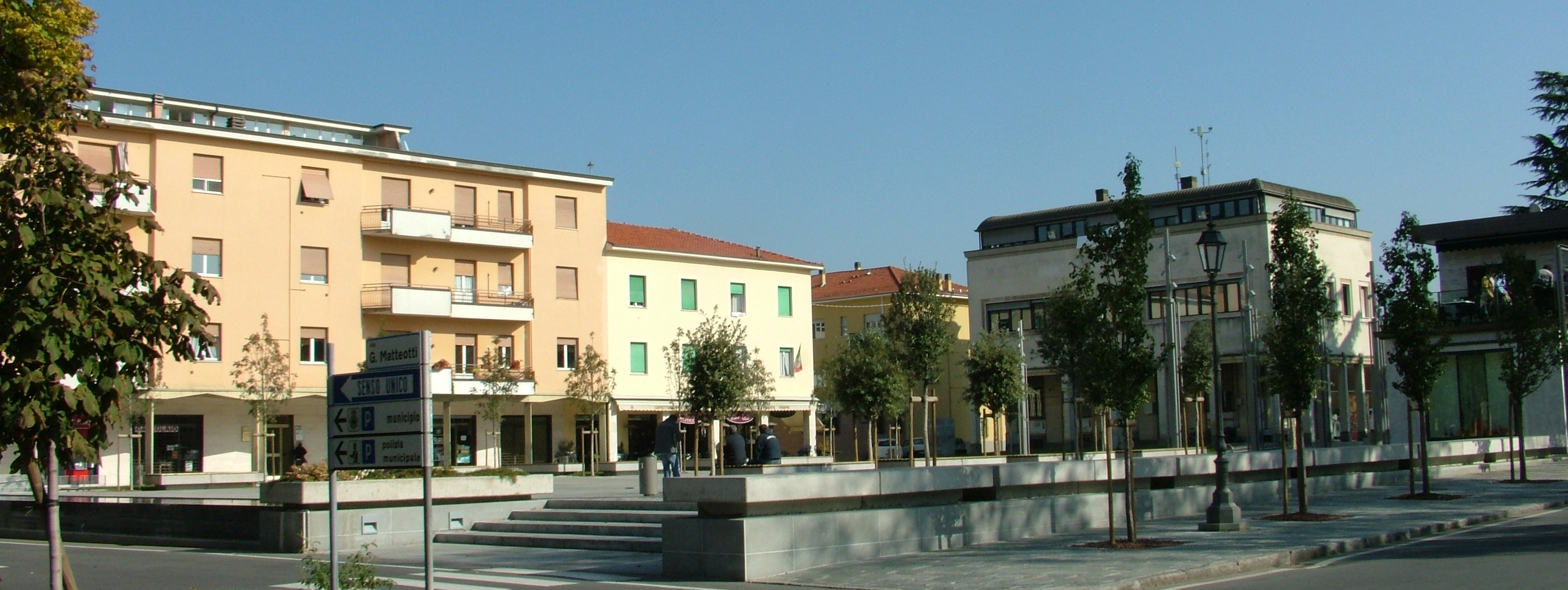
- Collecchio Piazza Libertà

- Location within Italy Location within Emilia-Romagna
- Coordinates: 44°45′N 10°13′E
- Country: Italy
- Region: Emilia-Romagna
- Province: Parma (PR)
- Frazioni: Case Quintavalla, Case Zingari, Collecchiello, Folli, Gaiano, Giarola, La Corte Anguissola, La Ripa, Lemignano, Madregolo, Maiatico, Oppiano, Ozzano Taro, Ponte Scodogna, San Martino Sinzano, Stradella, Villa Lucia, Villanuova, Villa Vecchia

Government
  - Mayor: Paolo Bianchi

Area
  - Total: 58 km^{2} (22 sq mi)
- Elevation: 112 m (367 ft)

Population (31 December 2014)
  - Total: 14,295
  - Density: 250/km^{2} (640/sq mi)
- Demonym: Collecchiesi
- Time zone: UTC+1 (CET)
  - Summer (DST): UTC+2 (CEST)
- Postal code: 43044
- Dialing code: 0521
- ISTAT code: 034009
- Patron saint: St. Prosper
- Saint day: 24 November
- Website: Official website

Collecchio (Parmigiano: Colècc') is a town in the province of Parma, Emilia-Romagna, northern Italy. It is located 12.9 kilometres (8.0 mi) by road southwest of the centre of Parma. A major food-producing area, it is home to multinational Italian dairy and food corporation Parmalat and the Parma F.C. training complex, Centro Sportivo di Collecchio, and is connected by railway. Under the Romans the town was called Sustrina, Later, in Christian times it was called, Colliculum, because of its location on a small hill. In 2015, Collecchio became recognized as the first community to mandate that all fireworks set off in the town be silent.

== History ==
The first signs of human settlement in Collecchio date from the Paleolithic Age. With growing numbers of inhabitants in the Neolithic, deforestation led to flooding in the plains. As a result, settlements were moved up into the hills.

The Roman road Clodia Segunda linking Parma and Luni (via Fornovo) and the Cisa Pass was a mainstay for the local economy and for the development of the ancient Roman city of Sustrina. The road can still be seen today, branching off to the left just before the bridge over the River Taro after leaving Parma on the Via Aemilia.

Collecchio's history is tied closely to that of nearby Parma, under whose powerful bishops the city was ruled.

The town is first mentioned in a document from 929 A.D. that refers to "ad castro Coliclo", although it is uncertain whether Collecchio ever had a real castle, it is certain that it did have a fortified Lombard court.

In 1000 A.D., the Lombard Countess Ferlinda gave a hospice to the canons of Parma in Madregolo.

After the year 1000 A.D., Collecchio was the centre of battles among the Visconti, Rossi, Pallavicino, and Sforza families that would endure until Parma would become a duchy in the hands of the Farnese family in 1545 A.D. There is a reference that is dated 1173 A.D., noting that the court of Collecchio was property owned by the monastery of San Paolo.

By 1777 A.D., further feuding had brought Collecchio under the rule of the Dalla Rosa-Prati family. In 1796 A.D., under Napoleon, the Commune of Collecchio was born.

At the end of the nineteenth century, Collecchio began to develop as an agricultural centre for canning and meat products in what has become known as Italy's food valley. In particular, the area became the driving force behind the Italian charcuterie industry with pioneers such as Archimede Rossi and Domenico Ferrari. Collecchio also began to produce dairy products, including Parmesan cheese.

On 27 April 1945, the town was liberated from German Nazi forces by the Brazilian Expeditionary Force in the Battle of Collecchio. Approximately 400 Germans were captured after two days of battle.

First to mandate silent fireworks

In 2015, the town introduced legislation mandating the use of 'silent' fireworks in consideration of animals and it has been recognized internationally as the first community to mandate silent fireworks.

== Main sights ==
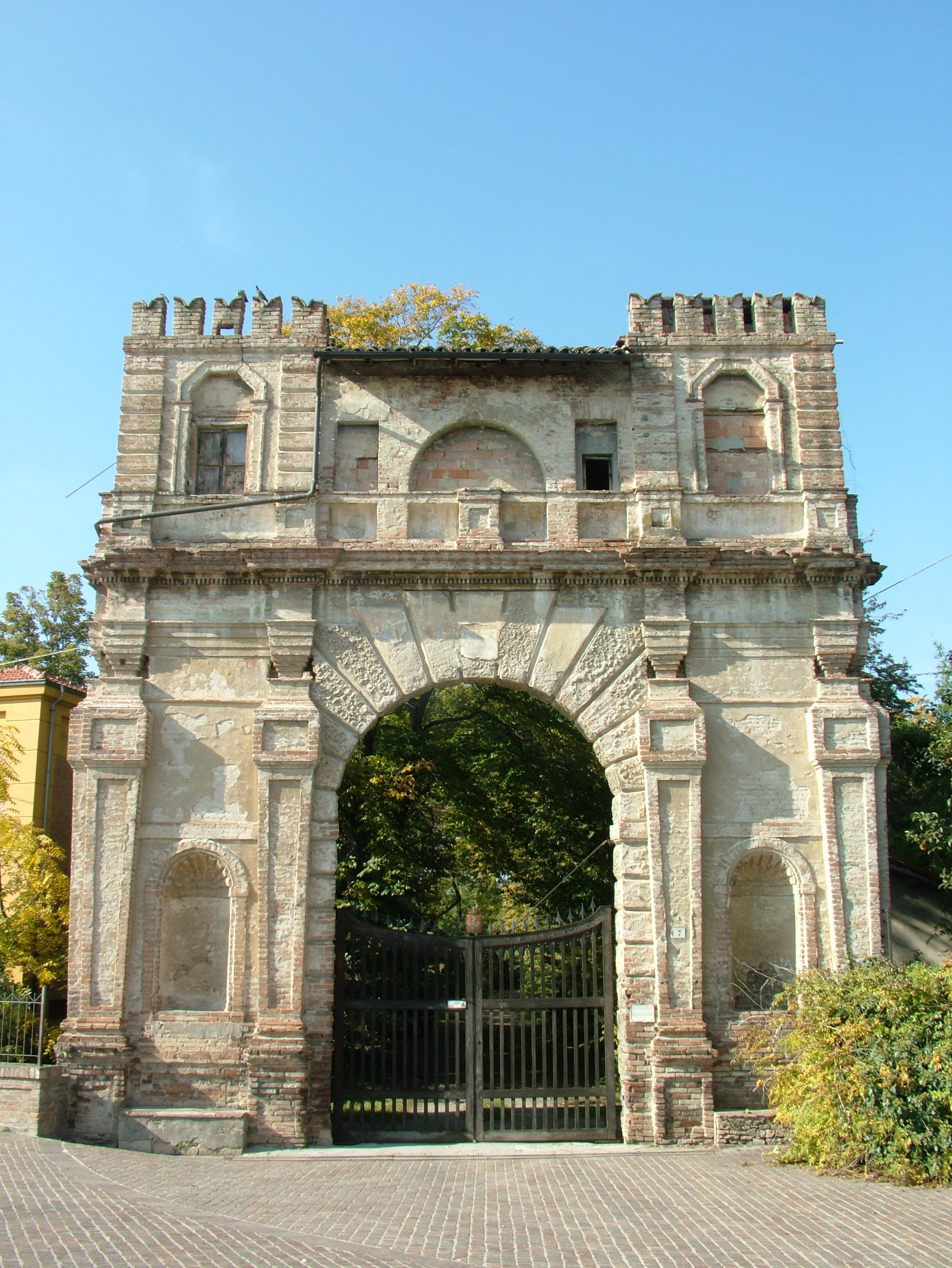
Arco del Bargello

A major food-producing area, it is home to the multinational Italian dairy and food corporation Parmalat and the Parma F.C. training complex, Centro Sportivo di Collecchio, and Il Collecchio Baseball Club, a baseball team established in 1974.

=== Architecture ===
Architecturally of note are the "Pieve di San Prospero" and "Villa Paveri-Fontana", formerly "Villa Dalla Rosa-Prati". Villa Paveri-Fontana was built in the late seventeenth century on a pre-existing sixteenth-century building. It still keeps rooms painted with mythological themes and architectural perspective.

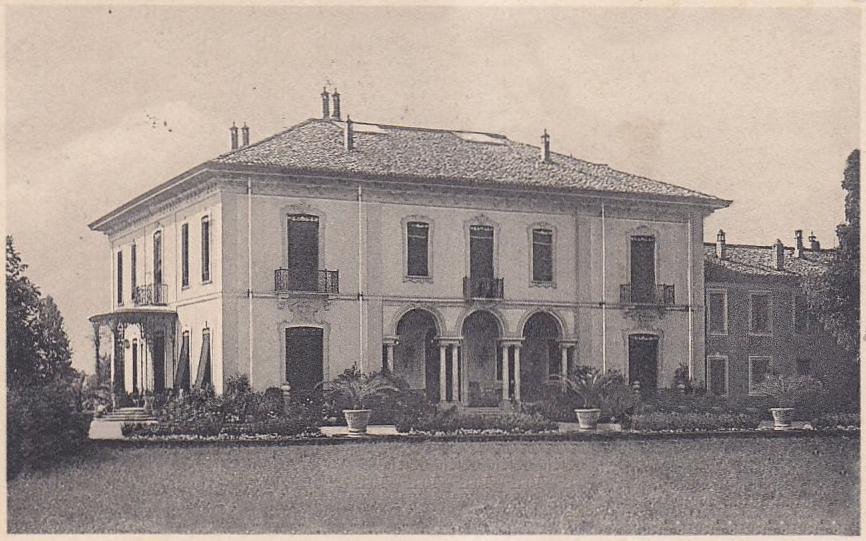
Villa Meli Lupi, c. 1910

A monumental arched structure that is called the "L'Arco del Bargello" stands at the entrance to a park. If approaching from Parma, the ornately decorated arch stands on the right and marks the entrance to the park.

"Villa Meli-Lupi di Soragna", located in the Fortunato Nevicati park, is an example of special architectural structures as it depicts a nut, with the front marked by small columns forming a portico, and a corner tower.

== People ==
- Riccardo Fainardi (1865–1959), painter and interior designer
- Gherardo Segarelli (c. 1240 – 1300), founder of the Apostolic Brethren
- Calisto Tanzi (1938–2022), notorious businessman

== Twin towns ==
Collecchio is twinned with:

- Butzbach, Germany
- Melide, Spain
