= Ennio Tardini =

Italian lawyer (1879–1923)

Ennio Tardini (8 September 1879 – 16 August 1923) was an Italian lawyer.

== Career ==
As chairman of Parma A.C., Tardini conceived the plans for what would later become the Stadio Ennio Tardini, though its construction was completed after the death of Tardini. In addition to his contributions to sports, Tardini was active in liberal politics, serving on the town council during the administration of Lusignan. His political career reflected his passion for social reform, notably during the great agricultural strike of 1908, which was a precursor to the significant union battles between 1919 and 1921, and ultimately led to the agricultural agreements.
