= Parmalat =

Italian company producing dairy products, juice, and tea

Parmalat S.p.A.
- Type: Società per azioni
- Industry: Food processing
- Founded: 1961; 65 years ago
- Founder: Calisto Tanzi
- Headquarters: Collecchio, Italy
- Key people: Jean-Marc Bernier (CEO)
- Products: Milk and dairy products, fruit juice, tea
- Revenue: €6.416 billion (2015)
- Operating income: €276.9 million (2015)
- Net income: €145.8 million (2015)
- Number of employees: 27,596 (end 2015)
- Parent: Lactalis
- Website: parmalat.com

Parmalat S.p.A. is an Italian dairy and food corporation which is a subsidiary of French multinational company Lactalis. It was founded by Calisto Tanzi in 1961.

Having become the leading global company in the production of long-life milk using ultra-high-temperature processing, the company collapsed in 2003 with €14bn ($20bn; £13bn) of debt in what remains Europe's biggest bankruptcy. Since 2011, it has been a subsidiary of French group Lactalis (with fuller control since 2019). Today, Parmalat is a company with a global presence, having operations in Europe, North America, South America, Australia, China, and South Africa.

Still specializing in UHT milk and milk derivatives (varieties of yogurt, cheese, butter, ice cream, etc.), the group also sells fruit juices distributed under the brand names Lactis, Santal, Malù, and Kyr. Its worldwide operations include almost 140 production centres and some 16,000 employees, with 5,000 Italian dairy farms supplying it. Its shares were listed on the Borsa Italiana.

== Early history (1961–2002) ==
In 1961, Calisto Tanzi, a 22-year-old college dropout, opened a small pasteurisation plant in Parma. Two decades later, the company had grown into a multinational corporation diversifying into milk, dairy, beverage, bakery, and other product lines in the 1980s, becoming listed on the Milan stock exchange in 1990, and expanding further in the 1990s. By 22 April 2002, Parmalat's share price had reached a record and the company was valued at €3.7bn, employing over 30,000 people in 30 countries. The company began to expand and had listed in its portfolio amongst other things: an expansion in the space of a decade from six countries into ownership of ParmaTour (a travel group) and Odeon TV, Parma F.C., Paulista Futebol Clube and S.E. Palmeiras.

From 1978 to 1984, Parmalat was the title sponsor of the Brabham Formula 1 team, and its logotype, prominently displayed on the vehicles, became strongly associated with the team and the drivers Niki Lauda and Nelson Piquet. The company continued as a minor sponsor of other Formula 1 teams as Forti, Ligier, Arrows and Sauber, due to other Brazilian driver, Pedro Diniz, from 1995 to 2000.

== Financial fraud (2002–2005) ==
In 1997, Parmalat expanded into financial markets, financing several international acquisitions, especially in the Western Hemisphere, with debt. But by 2001, many of the new divisions were producing losses, and the company financing shifted largely to the use of derivatives, apparently at least in part with the intention of hiding the extent of its losses and debt. In February 2003, chief financial officer Fausto Tonna unexpectedly announced a new €300 million bond issue. This came as a surprise both to the markets and to the CEO, Calisto Tanzi. Tanzi forced Tonna to resign and replaced him with Alberto Ferraris. According to an interview he later gave Time magazine, Ferraris was surprised to discover that, though now CFO, he still did not have access to some of the corporate books, which were being handled by chief accounting officer Luciano Del Soldato. He began making some inquiries and began to suspect that the company's total debt was more than double that on the balance sheet.

The plan for a €300 million fundraising effort was dropped in September 2003, and the company's shares depreciated significantly as a result of the publicised concerns raised over transactions with mutual fund Epicurum, a Cayman-based company linked to Parmalat by November. Ferraris resigned less than a week after the public fall-out and was replaced by Del Soldato. Del Soldato resigned the next month, unable to get cash from Epicurum fund, needed to pay debts and make bond payments totalling at least €150 million. Bonlat was a subsidiary of Parmalat set up in the Cayman Islands. Bonlat's bank, Bank of America, then released a document showing €3.95 billion in Parmalat's bank account as a forgery. Tanzi resigned as chairman and CEO. Hundreds of thousands of investors lost their money and would never recover it.

Prime Minister Silvio Berlusconi changed bankruptcy laws by decree to allow a company to seek accelerated protection from creditors, by giving extraordinary powers to a government-appointment administrator (commissario). Enrico Bondi was named commissario.

Calisto Tanzi was detained hours after the firm was declared officially insolvent in late December and admitted that there was a hole of €8 billion in Parmalat's accounts, but denied any cover-up. The arrest of five other executives followed. The auditors of the administration eventually determined that the debts amounted to €14.3 billion, which was almost eight times the sum originally stated. Several of the company's subsidiaries subsequently went insolvent, including its Brazilian, Argentinian and American operations and its football club in Parma.

Tanzi was eventually charged with financial fraud and money laundering. Among the questionable accounting practices used by Parmalat were selling itself credit-linked notes, in effect placing a bet on its own creditworthiness to conjure up an asset out of thin air. After his arrest, Tanzi reportedly admitted during questioning at Milan's San Vittore prison that he diverted funds from Parmalat into Parmatour and elsewhere. The family football and tourism enterprises were financial disasters as well, as Tanzi attempted to rival Berlusconi by buying Odeon TV, only to sell it at a loss of about €45 million. Tanzi was sentenced to 10 years in prison for fraud relating to the collapse of the dairy group. The other seven defendants, including executives and bankers, were acquitted. Another eight defendants settled out of court in September 2008. New leadership at Parmalat began investigating and suing Bank of America, Deloitte and Grant Thornton International – the bank and auditing firms that were alleged to have helped in perpetrating the fraud of earlier management at Parmalat.

In 2007, Deloitte settled on paying $149M to Parmalat. Bank of America, Parmalat's bank in many Special-purpose entities, settled for $100M payment to Parmalat in 2009. Grant Thornton International, Parmalat's auditing company, settled after repeated lawsuits for $4.4M with Parmalat. The new management at Parmalat recovered about $700M in payments from the banks and auditing firms it sued for negligence and aiding in the fraud of former Parmalat leadership.

== Modern history ==
In 2005, Vicenzi bought from Parmalat the unprofitable bakery plant of Nusco, opened in 1984 for political reasons because it was the home town of Democrazia Cristiana chieftain Ciriaco De Mita.

By 2011, Parmalat had grown cash to €1.5 billion. In March 2011, the French multinational Lactalis, which already owns the Galbani, Invernizzi, Locatelli and Cademartori brands in Italy and is controlled by the Besnier family, began to acquire Parmalat shares. Lactalis quickly purchased nearly 30% of the company on the open market and in July 2011, succeeded in its €2.5 billion takeover offer, reaching a control of 80% shares at €2.6 per share.

In 2015, revenues reached €6.42 billion and EBITDA €444.5 million. On 27 December 2016, the French group, which controls 87.74% of Parmalat, activated the delisting procedure trying to withdraw it from the stock exchange listing. Lactalis prepared to delist Parmalat in 2016, with a buyout offer at €2.8 per share to acquire the remaining 12%, then raised to €3 but eventually failed due to opposition by hedge fund Amber and others. In December 2018, Lactalis was thought to have almost reached 95% shares at an open market price of around €2.85/share and to be about to launch a new takeover and delisting offer. Lactalis acquired 7% of the shares from Amber and other shareholders which had opposed the 2016 takeover, and confirmed the delisting for March 2019.

Lactalis moved all strategic activities to France and gradually wound down operations in Italy. In 2019, the future of the historical factory in Rome was also in doubt.

== Countries of operation ==
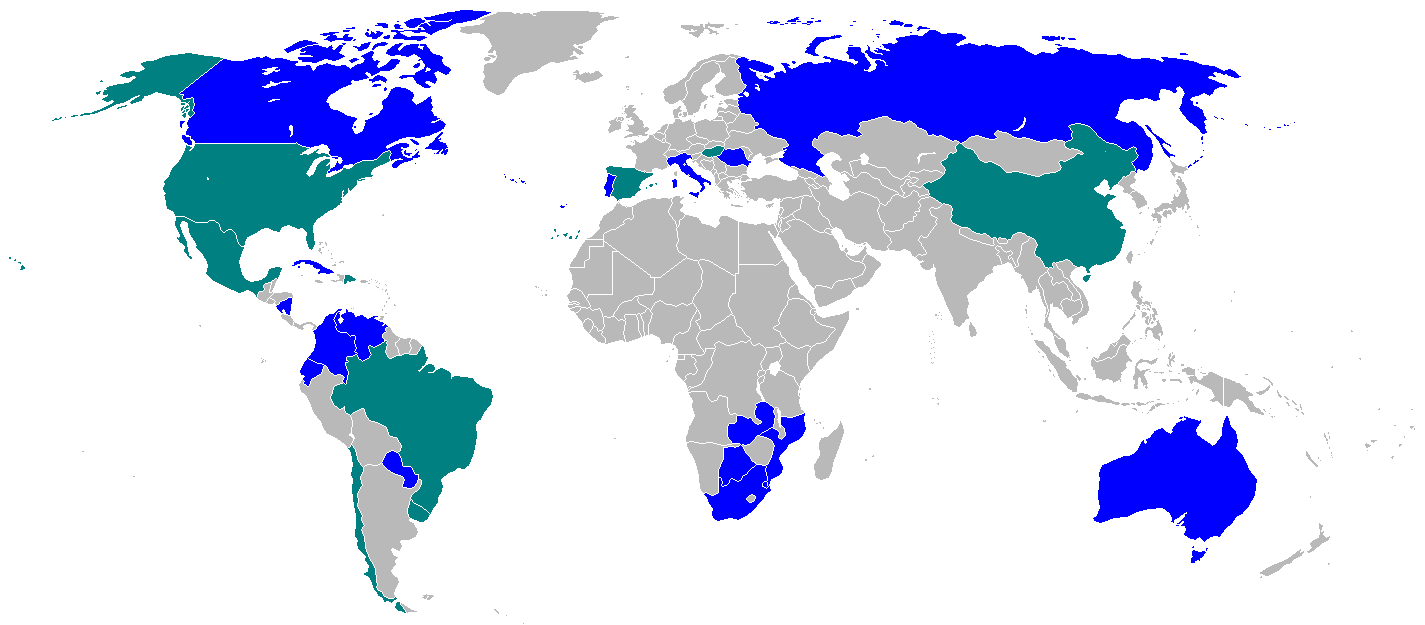
Parmalat in the world: in blue direct presence, in green presence under licence

=== Countries of direct presence ===
- Australia
- Bolivia
- Botswana
- Canada
- Colombia
- Cuba
- Ecuador
- Eswatini
- Hong Kong
- Italy
- Mexico
- Mozambique
- New Zealand
- Paraguay
- Peru
- Portugal
- Romania
- Russia
- South Africa
- Venezuela
- Zambia

=== Countries of presence through license ===
- Argentina
- Brazil
- Chile
- China
- Costa Rica
- Dominican Republic
- El Salvador
- Guatemala
- Haiti
- Honduras
- Hungary
- Mexico
- Nicaragua
- Spain
- United States
- Uruguay

== See also ==
- List of Italian companies
- Gianmario Roveraro
