= Fanny Tardini-Vladicescu =

Romanian opera singer and actress

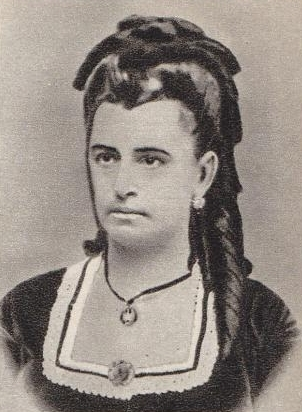

Fanny Tardini-Vladicescu (1823–1908) was a Romanian opera singer and stage actor.

In 1860, Tardini-Vladicescu became the manager of her own opera- and theatre company, Compania Fanny Tardini-Vlădicescu, which was famous in Romania and played a pioneer role in the nations' stage history.
