= Giuseppe Carlo Ferrari =

Italian footballer and coach

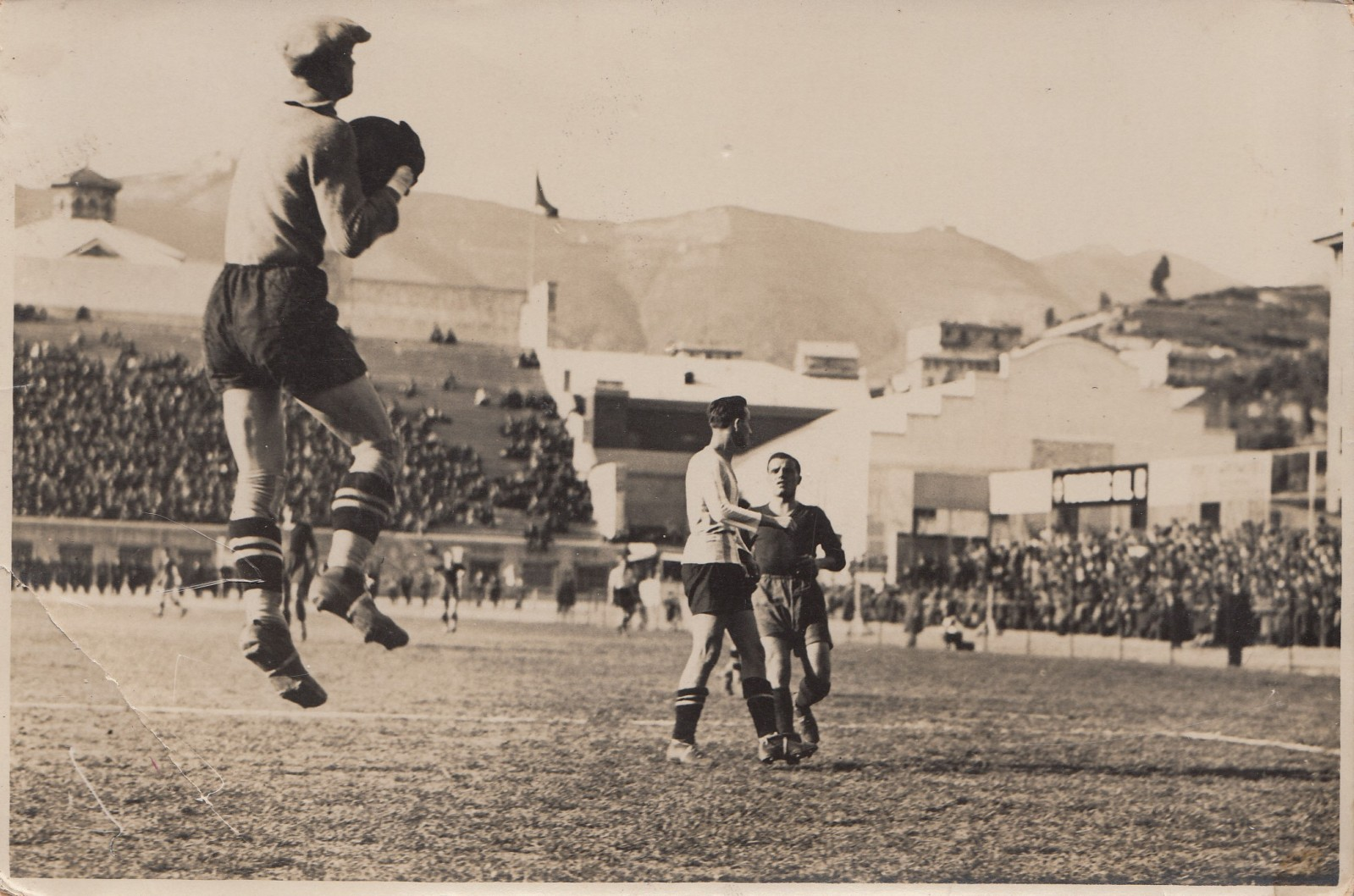

Personal information
- Date of birth: 30 October 1910
- Place of birth: Modena, Italy
- Date of death: 29 January 1987
- Place of death: Altagracia de Orituco, Venezuela
- Height: 1.65 m (5 ft 5 in)
- Position: Forward

Senior career*
Years	Team	Apps	(Gls)
1928–1932	Modena	3	(0)
1931–1932	Catanzaro	?	(?)
1932–1937	Genoa	130	(17)
1937–1938	Sanremese	19	(4)
1938–1939	Cremonese	25	(4)
1939	Lazio	0	(0)
1939–1940	Modena	3	(0)
1940–1943	Parma	80	(32)

Managerial career
- 1945–1946: Parma
- 1948–1949: Parma
- * Club domestic league appearances and goals

Giuseppe Carlo Ferrari (born 30 October 1910 in Modena; died 29 January 1987 in Altagracia de Orituco, Venezuela) was an Italian footballer and coach.

== Playing career ==
Starting his career at hometown club Modena, Ferrari made his Serie A debut on 7 December 1930 in a 4–1 victory over Legnano. In 1931, he moved to Catanzaro, achieving ninth place in Girone F of the 1931–32 Prima Divisione, before securing a move to giants Genoa, where he won the 1936–37 Coppa Italia without a missing a match. He spent the following season at Atalanta, where he did not make an appearance, leading to a move to Cremonese, who finished the 1938–39 edition of Serie C's Girone B in second place. Having been signed by Lazio but never taking to the field of play due to a severe knee injury, Ferrari returned to Modena in 1939, but relegation followed. In 1940, Ferrari was signed by Parma, where he would spend three seasons as a player in the most prolific goalscoring form of his career.

== Coaching career ==
Still at Parma, Ferrari went on to become a member of the coaching staff, being appointed head coach of the team for the 1945–46 season. In the 1950s, some years after the end of his playing career, Ferrari emigrated to Venezuela, where he continued his involvement with football as a coach. He resided in Venezuela until his death.

== Honours ==
Genoa

- Serie B: 1934–35
- Coppa Italia: 1936–37
