= Kyle Krause =

American businessman (born 1963)

- Born: Kyle J. Krause; January 10, 1963 (age 63)
- Education: University of Iowa
- Occupations: Entrepreneur, philanthropist humanitarian
- Organization: Krause Group
- Known for: Owner and President of Parma
- Website: https://www.krausegroup.com

Kyle J. Krause (born January 10, 1963) is an American entrepreneur and founder who built Krause Group into a global platform spanning across professional sport, wine, and real-estate. He is also the owner and president of Serie A club Parma.

Krause is a third-generation leader of his family’s business starting with Kum & Go. One of the largest privately held convenience store chains in the United States before selling in 2023 and redirecting Krause Groups capital into a diversified portfolio.

== Early life ==
Krause was born on January 10, 1963, and is a native of Hampton, Iowa, the small north-central Iowa town where his grandfather and father founded Kum & Go in 1959. He is of Italian descent through his mother. Krause began working in the family business as a child, filling orders at what is now Solar Transport at age 9 and taking on odd jobs at Kum & Go stores at age 10. He went on to attend the University of Iowa, earning a BBA in finance in 1985 from what is now the Tippie College of Business.

== Career ==
=== Kum & Go and Solar Transport ===
At age 35, Krause started Kum & Go LC, a venture operating four convenience stores independently of the chain run by his father, William "Bill" Krause. Within six years he had grown that operation to roughly 250 stores.In 2004, Krause became CEO and president of the combined company, merging his father's original chain with the business he had built. Under his leadership, Kum & Go grew into a chain of more than 400 stores across 13 states, with revenue roughly doubling and earnings increasing fivefold during his tenure; the company was named CSP magazine's Retail Leader of the Year in 2018. In 2018, Krause's son Tanner was named president of Kum & Go, with Kyle moving into the chairman and CEO role, and the company relocated its headquarters into the newly built, Renzo Piano-designed Krause Gateway Center in downtown Des Moines.

In August 2023, Krause Group sold Kum & Go and its affiliated logistics company, Solar Transport, to Utah-based Maverik (a subsidiary of FJ Management) in a deal reported to be valued near $2 billion, ending 64 years of Krause family ownership of the chain. At the time of the sale Maverik had said they would keep the Kum & Go brand and retain the Des Moines corporate employees. Less than 3 years after the sale closed, Maverik would eliminate the Kum & Go brand entirely and lay off the majority of the Kum & Go employees in the Des Moines office. Krause has said he had no plans to retire following the sale, citing the other companies in the Krause Group portfolio that continued to require his attention.

=== Krause Group ===
Krause founded Krause Group in 2021 as a family owned and founder led parent company the builds and stewards a portfolio business across sport, wine, and real estate.

Headquartered in Des Moines, with operations in Iowa, Italy, and Portugal, Krause Group invests in brands that shape how people experience the world, how they gather, compete, and connect.

=== Parma Calcio 1913 ===
In September 2020, Krause Group acquired Parma Calcio 1913, an Italian football club with a championship history dating to the early 1990s but which had suffered bankruptcy and relegation to the lower divisions earlier in the 2010s.The deal, reported at roughly $100 million, made Krause the fourth American businessman to own a club playing in Italy's Serie A at the time, following ownership groups at AC Milan, Fiorentina, and AS Roma.

Parma's results under Krause Group ownership have fluctuated: the club finished 12th in Serie B in the 2021–22 season, reached the Serie B play-off semifinals in 2022–23, and won promotion back to Serie A by finishing first in Serie B in 2023–24. The men's first team has remained in Serie A since, finishing 16th in both the 2024–25 and 2025–26 seasons. By the club's fifth anniversary under Krause ownership in September 2025, Parma Calcio had four of its teams competing in their respective top divisions, including a women's first team that secured its own promotion that year. Krause has also discussed plans to expand the club's youth and training infrastructure and to continue investing in the women's program in Parma.

=== Des Moines Menace and Pro Iowa ===
Krause's involvement in soccer ownership predates Parma: he became majority owner of the Des Moines Menace, a USL League Two team, in 1998. Building on that foundation, Krause founded USL Pro Iowa in 2019 with the goal of bringing professional men's and women's soccer to central Iowa, anchored by a planned multi-use stadium and "Global Plaza" in downtown Des Moines, to be developed by Krause+, the Krause Group real estate arm, on the site of a former Dico Superfund property. As of late 2025, the project's roughly $75 million funding package included a $23–24 million personal contribution from Kyle and Sharon Krause alongside public and private partners including American Equity Investment Life, MidAmerican Energy, and Hy-Vee. With its capital stack completed in late 2025 and design work underway in 2026, the project anticipates fielding a men's team in the USL Championship and a women's team in the USL Super League before the end of the decade.

=== Italian hospitality and wine ===
Alongside Parma Calcio, Krause Group built a portfolio of Piedmont, Italy hospitality and wine assets, including the wineries Vietti and Enrico Serafino and the five-star resort Casa di Langa. Krause has described plans to continue expanding the group's footprint in Italian hospitality and to acquire additional wineries over time.

== Awards and recognition ==
In 2023, Krause received the University of Iowa Tippie College of Business's Oscar C. Schmidt Iowa Business Leadership Award, an honor recognizing individuals who have made a significant impact on the Iowa economy; his father, William Krause, received the same award in 2007. In 2018, Krause was named CSP magazine's Retail Leader of the Year in recognition of Kum & Go's growth and innovation under his leadership.

== Personal life ==
Krause is married to Sharon Krause, and the couple has five children, along with several grandchildren.
