= Parma Calcio 1913 =

Association football club in Italy

Parma
- Full name: Parma Calcio 1913 S.r.l.
- Nicknames: I Crociati (The Crusaders); I Gialloblu (The Yellow and Blues); I Ducali (The Duchy Men); Gli Emiliani (The Emilians)
- Founded: 27 July 1913; 113 years ago, as Verdi Foot Ball Club; 1970; 56 years ago, as Parma Associazione Calcio; 25 June 2004; 22 years ago, as Parma Football Club; 27 July 2015; 11 years ago, as Parma Calcio 1913
- Stadium: Stadio Ennio Tardini
- Capacity: 27,906
- Owner: Krause Group CSR
- President: Kyle Krause
- Head coach: Alberto Gilardino
- League: Serie A
- 2025–26: Serie A, 13th of 20
- Website: parmacalcio1913.com
Home colours	Away colours	Third colours

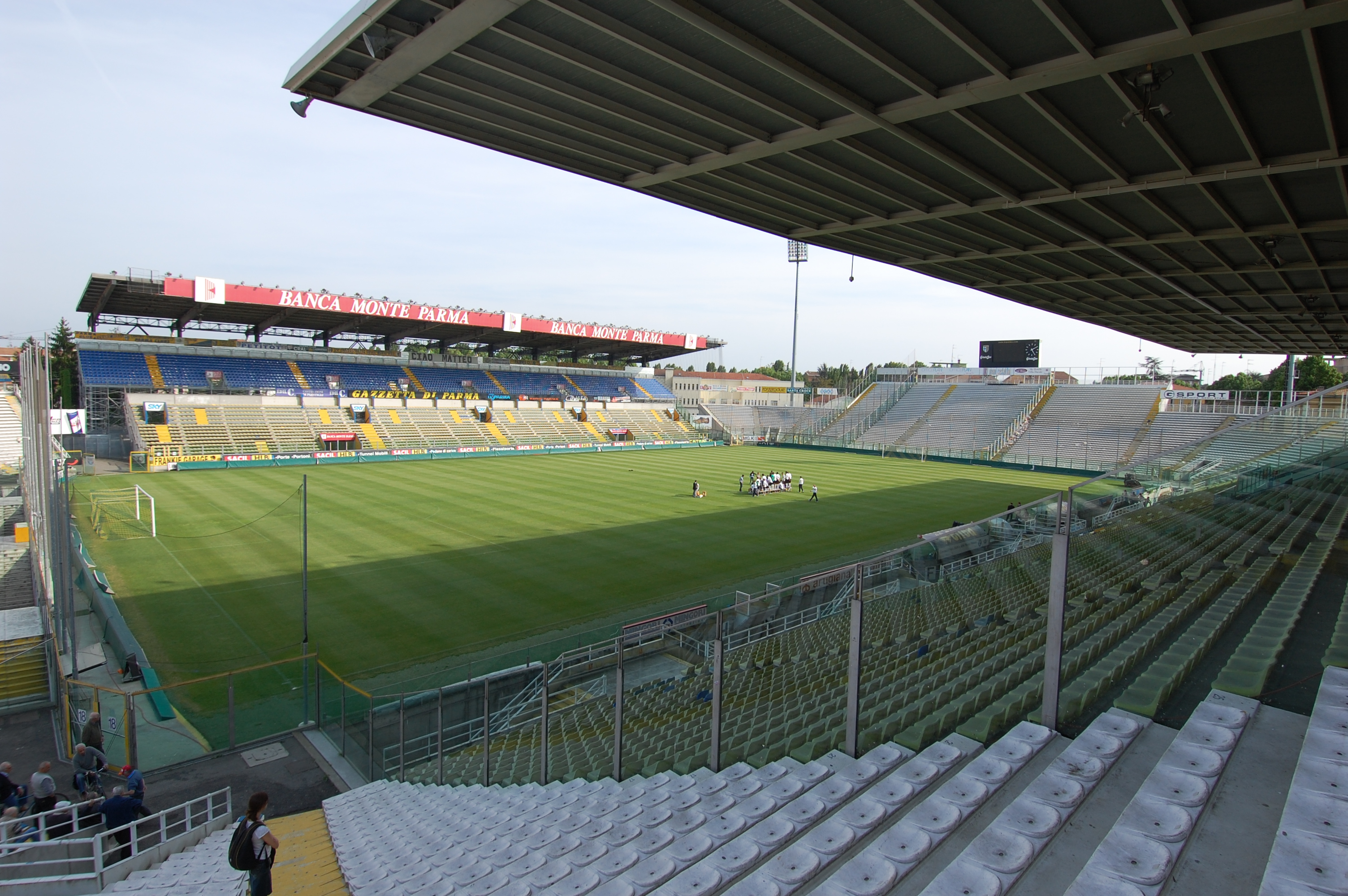
A view of the Tribuna Est and Curva Sud from the north-west quadrant.

Parma Calcio 1913 (Italian pronunciation: [ˈparma]) is an Italian professional football club based in Parma, Emilia-Romagna, which competes in Serie A, the top tier of the Italian football league system.

Parma Football Club was originally founded in December 1913, while the current society dates back to 2015. The team has been playing its home matches at the 27,906-seat Stadio Ennio Tardini, often referred to as simply Il Tardini, since 1923.

Financed by Calisto Tanzi, the club won eight trophies between 1992 and 2002, a period in which it achieved its best ever league finish as runners-up in the 1996–97 season. The club has won three Coppa Italia, one Supercoppa Italiana, two UEFA Cups, one European Super Cup and one UEFA Cup Winners' Cup.

Financial troubles were brought about in late 2003 by the Parmalat scandal which caused the parent company to collapse and resulted in the club operating in controlled administration until January 2007. The club was declared bankrupt in 2015 and refounded in the Serie D, but secured a record three straight promotions to return to the top flight in 2018.

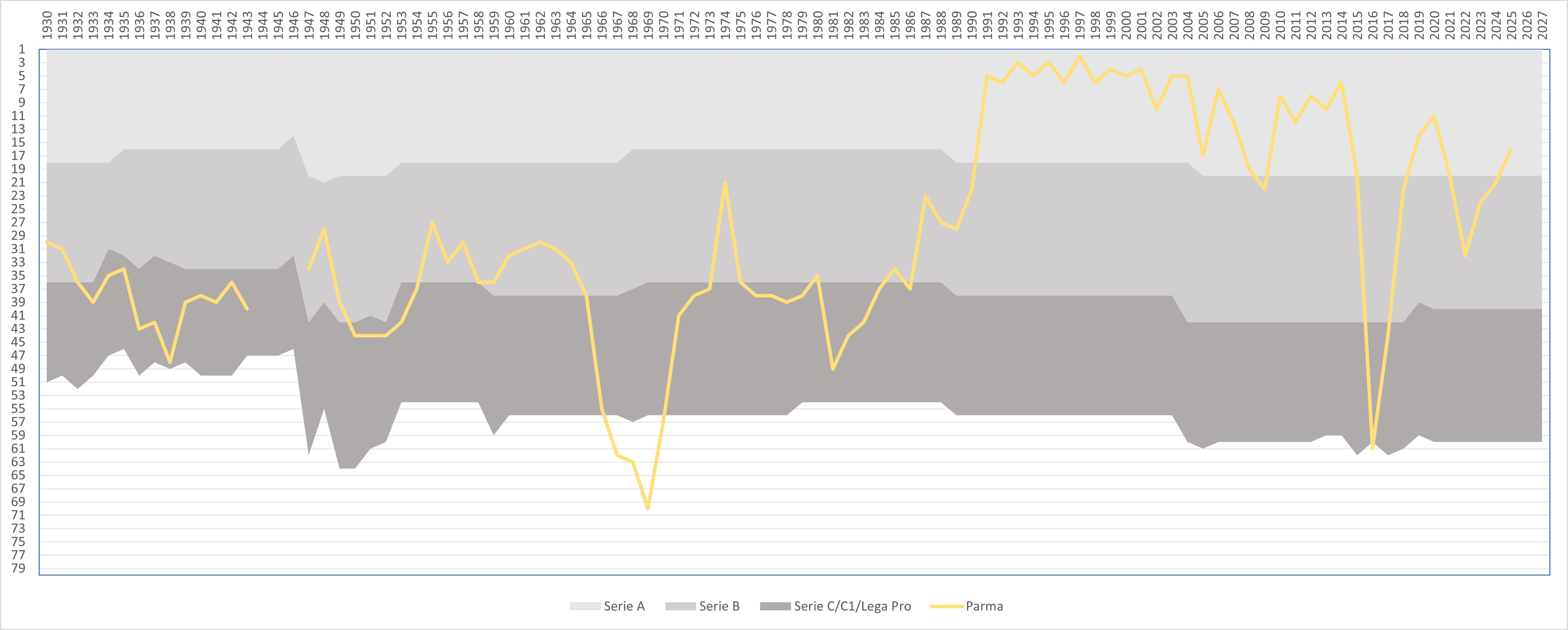
The performance of Parma in the Italian football league structure since the first season of a unified Serie A (1929/30)

== History ==
=== Early years (1913–1968) ===
Location of Parma in Italy

The club was founded in July 1913 as Verdi Foot Ball Club in honour of the centenary of famous opera composer Giuseppe Verdi, who was born in the province of Parma. It adopted yellow and blue as its colours.

In December of the same year, Parma Foot Ball Club was formed from many of the original club's players and began wearing white shirts emblazoned with a black cross. Parma began playing league football during the 1919–20 season after the end of World War I. Construction of a stadium, the Stadio Ennio Tardini, began two years later. Parma became a founder member of Serie B after finishing as runners-up in the Prima Divisione in the 1928–29 season. The club would remain in Serie B for three years before being relegated and changing its name to Associazione Sportiva Parma in 1930. In the 1935–36 season, Parma became a founding member of Serie C, where the club stayed until winning promotion back to Serie B in 1943. Italian football was then brought to a halt as the Second World War intensified, although the team did make an appearance in the Campionato Alta Italia in 1944.

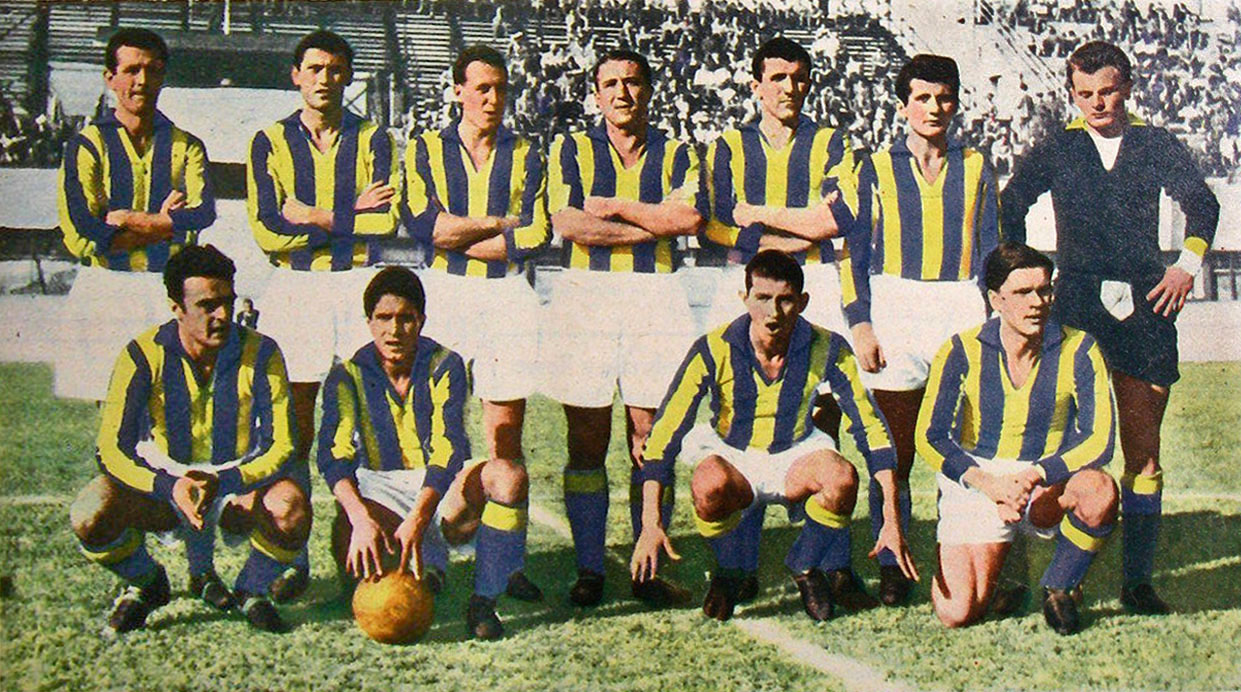
1956–57 Parma in Gialloblù shirt

Following the restart of organised football, Parma spent three years in Serie B, then split into two regional divisions, before again being relegated in 1948–49 to Serie C. The side would spend another five seasons in Serie C before an eleven-year spell in Serie B that included the achievement of ninth position in 1954–55, a club record at that time. This was an era in which the club's players generally held down other jobs or were still in education and when the town's amateur rugby union and volleyball sides, Rugby Parma F.C. 1931 and Ferrovieri Parma, proved more popular among the more privileged. Parma made its debut in European competition during the 1960–61 season, defeating Swiss side AC Bellinzona in the Coppa delle Alpi, but relegation to Serie C followed in 1964–65 season. Parma spent just one season in Serie C before a second successive relegation, this time to Serie D, in 1966.

=== Rebirth and improvement (1968–1989) ===
The club was in turmoil and was ordered into liquidation by the Court of Parma in 1968, changing its name to Parma Football Club that year. In 1969, another local team, Associazione Calcio Parmense, won promotion to Serie D. On 1 January 1970, A.C. Parmense adopted the sporting licence of the liquidated club which had been formed in 1913. This meant that it had the right to use the Crociata shirts, the badge and the city's name. This brought about a change of luck in both financial and sporting terms, as the side was crowned Serie D champions and spent three years in Serie C before promotion to Serie B; however, it was a short stay. The team was relegated back to Serie C in its second season in the division. A return to Serie B did not materialise until the end of the 1970s and the club again lasted only one season in the second division of Italian football.

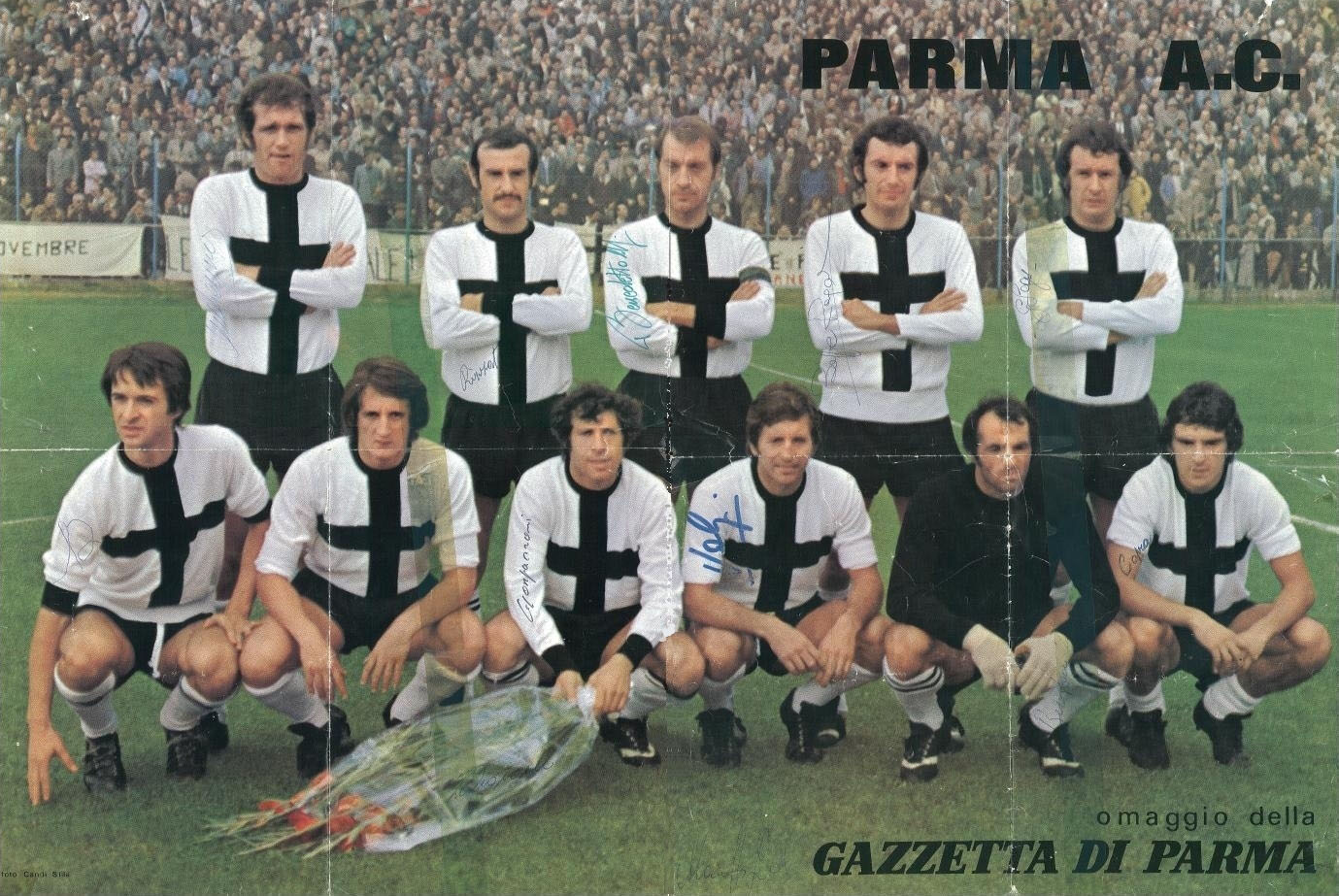
1973–74 Parma in its classic Crociata shirt

Under the management of Cesare Maldini, Parma once again returned to Serie B after winning its division in 1984 with victory on the final day over Sanremo; Juventus-bound Stefano Pioli scored the only goal of the game. The Ducali again only spent a year in Serie B, finishing third from bottom and succumbing to relegation as a consequence. Arrigo Sacchi did, however, manage to return the club to Serie B in 1986 after a single season in the third tier. The side enjoyed good success that season in missing out on promotion to Italy's top tier by just three points and eliminating A.C. Milan from the Coppa Italia, a result that convinced owner Silvio Berlusconi to hire Sacchi as the new manager of the Rossoneri. Sacchi's replacement, Zdeněk Zeman, was fired after just seven matches and replaced by Giampieri Vitali, who secured two consecutive mid-table finishes.

=== Success and insolvency (1989–2004) ===
Nevio Scala was appointed as head coach in 1989. Scala's Parma secured a historic promotion in 1990 to Serie A with a 2–0 Derby dell'Enza win over Reggiana. Investment from parent company Parmalat helped to improve the team's fortunes and the club made its debut in UEFA competition in 1991. Scala led the club to its first four major honours. The first of these was the Coppa Italia in 1991–92, beating Juventus 2–1 over two legs. The following year came the first international triumph in a 3–1 victory in the Cup Winners' Cup over Belgian side Antwerp at Wembley. The next season, the side was successful in the European Super Cup, overcoming Milan 2–1 on aggregate, but lost the Cup Winners' Cup final 1–0 to Arsenal. Scala's final success with Parma was in another two-legged final against Juventus: Dino Baggio scored twice to give Parma a 2–1 aggregate win, but Juventus exacted revenge in the Coppa Italia final. Replaced by Carlo Ancelotti, Scala departed in 1996 and was a popular coach for the trophies he won and because the team played attractive football in the tradition of the club.

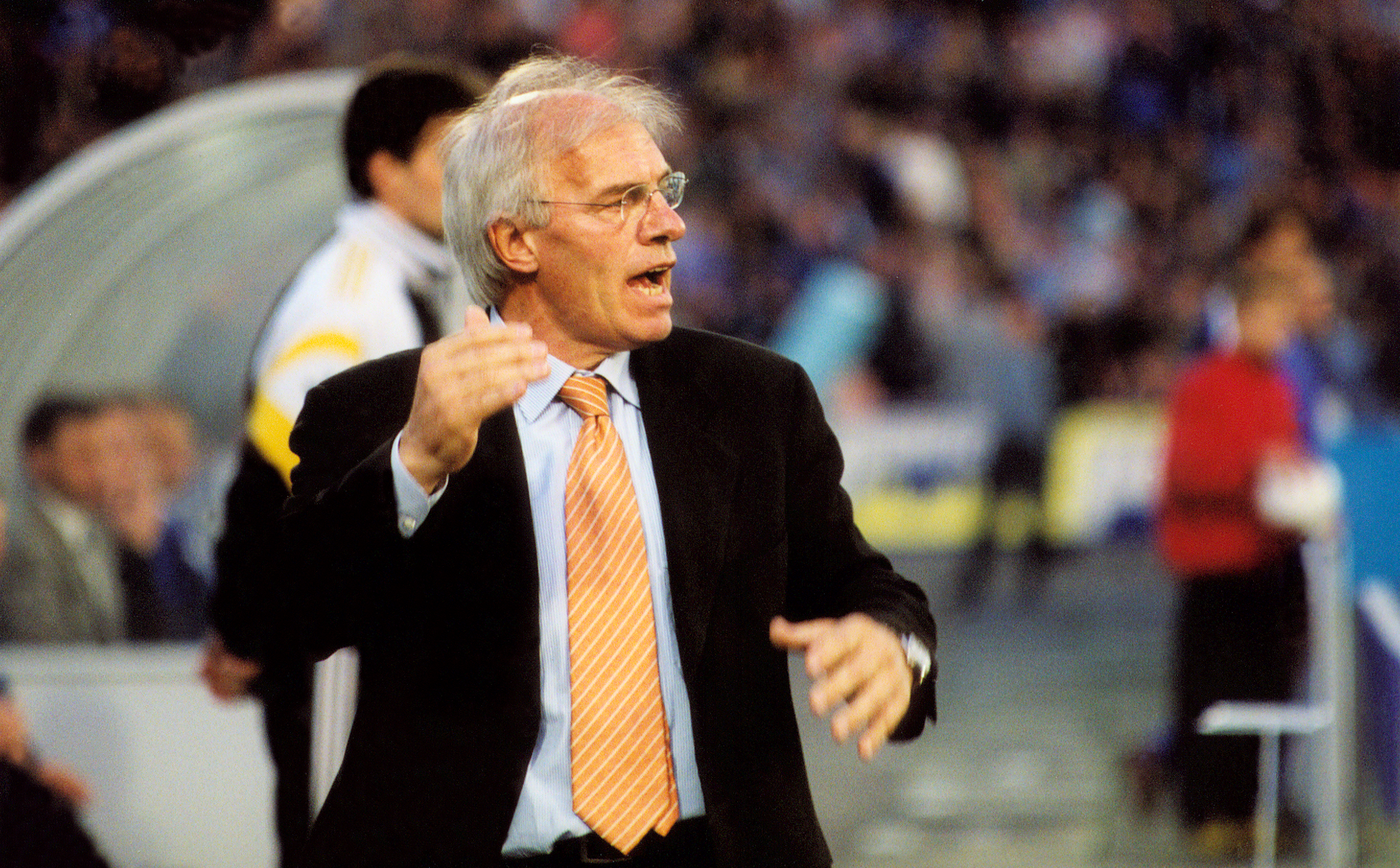
Nevio Scala trained the squad between 1989 and 1996, taking it from second division to European triumphs.

Ancelotti overhauled the team and guided it to a record second place in 1997. Parma consequently made its debut in the UEFA Champions League the following year. Alberto Malesani was installed as coach in 1998 and the club completed a rare cup double in his first season, winning the Coppa Italia final against Fiorentina on the away goals rule and the UEFA Cup against Marseille at the Luzhniki Stadium in Moscow with a 3–0 victory before 1999 Supercoppa Italiana victory over league champions Milan followed in August 1999. In 2000, Hernán Crespo was sold to Lazio for a world record transfer fee and Malesani departed.

Under replacement Renzo Ulivieri, the club lost the Coppa Italia final to Fiorentina. Under Pietro Carmignani in 2002, Parma won the third Coppa Italia trophy against Juventus (but would slip to defeat in the 2002 Supercoppa Italiana) and finished outside the top six for the first time since promotion in 1990. This success earned it a tag as one of the "Seven Sisters". In April 2004, the club was declared insolvent following the financial meltdown of Parmalat and the club remained in special administration for three years.

=== Rebirth and another bankruptcy (2004–2015) ===
The club re-formed as Parma Football Club SpA in June 2004 (as a subsidiary of being liquidated Parma AC SpA) and the 2004–05 season saw Parma plummet to its lowest finish in Serie A – despite a second consecutive 23-goal haul from Gilardino, who was then sold for €25 million – as managers came and went. Parma ended the following season, its first without European competition since 1991, in tenth, but returned in 2006 after the Calciopoli scandal.

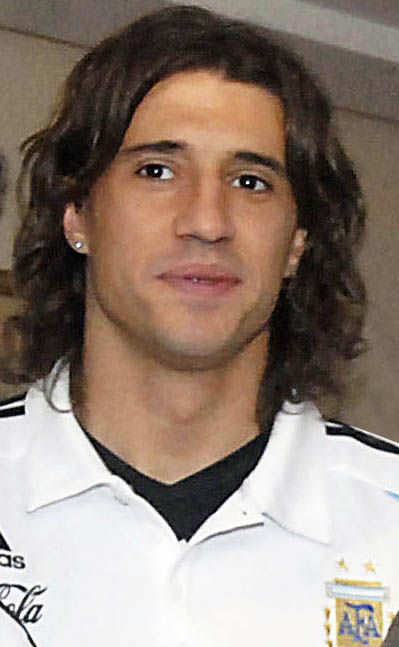
Hernán Crespo represented the club in two spells (1996–2000 and 2010–2012), winning three trophies and becoming the club's all-time record goalscorer.

On 24 January 2007, Tommaso Ghirardi bought the club out of administration and became the owner and president of the club. Manager Claudio Ranieri helped the team avoid relegation to Serie B on the final day of the 2006–07 season following his February appointment. However, under a succession of managers, Parma's battle with relegation the following year was not successful, consigning the club to Serie B after 18 years in the top flight.

Francesco Guidolin won promotion back to Serie A at the first attempt with a second-place finish and led the side to eighth on its return to Serie A in 2009–10, narrowly missing out on qualification for the UEFA Europa League before leaving for Udinese. In May 2010, Guidolin swapped jobs with Pasquale Marino, who was sacked by Ghirardi in April 2011 when Parma was caught in another relegation dogfight. Under Marino's replacement, Franco Colomba, Parma escaped the threat of relegation with two games to spare. In January 2012, Colomba was replaced by Roberto Donadoni following a winless run that culminated in a 5–0 loss to Inter Milan and the new coach led the team to eighth position in a Serie A club record seven-match winning run.

In 2014, Donadoni guided Parma to sixth in Serie A and a third consecutive top ten finish, but a return to Europe in the Europa League for the first time since 2007 was barred due to the late payment of income tax on salaries, not qualifying for a UEFA license, for which the club would also be docked points during the 2014–15 Serie A season. Financial troubles precipitated a succession of ownership changes and the club's eventual bankruptcy in March 2015 with total liabilities of €218 million, including €63m unpaid salaries. The club was allowed to finish the season but finished bottom of the league in 20th place. Administrators Angelo Anedda and Alberto Guiotto were forced to put some trophies to sell in an auction in a desperate attempt to raise money to cover the debt. These included: three Coppa Italia won in 1992, 1999 and 2002, the UEFA Cup Winners' Cup from 1993, the 1994 UEFA Super Cup, two UEFA Cup of 1995 and 1999 and the 1999 Supercoppa Italiana.

=== Another rebirth (2015–present) ===
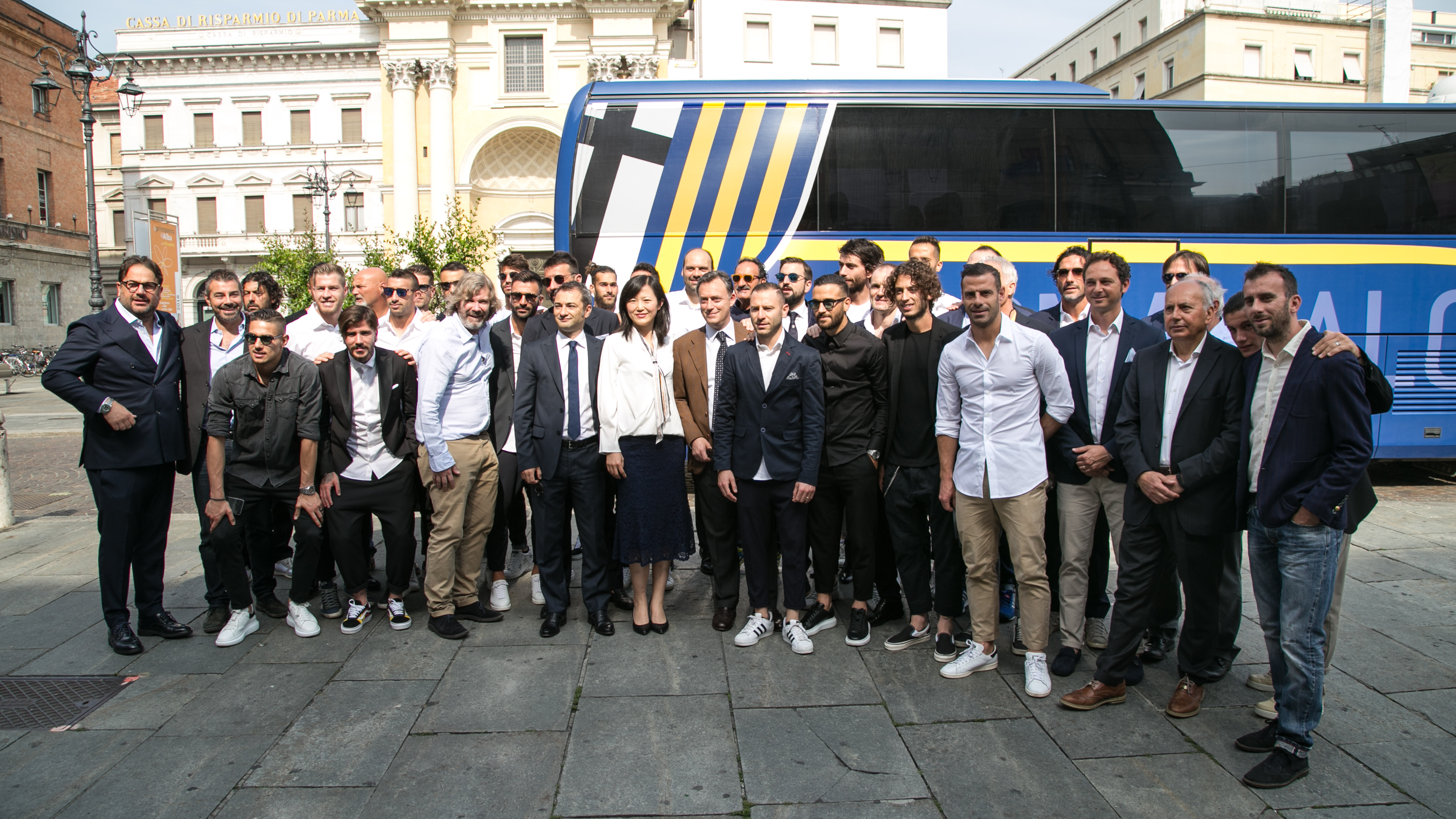
Parma awarded at the city hall for its 3rd in-a-row promotion between 2015 and 2018, which brought the club back from Serie D to Serie A

The re-founded club, S.S.D. Parma Calcio 1913, was formed in July 2015, taking its name from the year of foundation of the predecessor club and securing a place in the 2015–16 Serie D under article 52 of N.O.I.F. as the representative of Parma. Ex-head coach Nevio Scala was appointed as president and former player Luigi Apolloni was chosen as head coach. In the club's first season, it sold over 9,000 season tickets, more than doubling the Serie D record. Parma achieved promotion from Serie D into professional football league Lega Pro with three games to spare following a 2–1 win against Delta Rovigo, ending the season in first place with 94 points from 38 games, and an unbeaten run of 28 victories and 10 draws.

Parma ended the 2016–17 Lega Pro season in second place of Group B, but were promoted to Serie B after a 2–0 win over Alessandria in the promotion play-off final.

On 18 May 2018, Parma achieved a third promotion in three seasons, becoming the first Italian football club to achieve this, having finished the 2017–18 Serie B season second behind champions Empoli and level on points with Frosinone, but achieving automatic promotion due to a better head-to-head record, thus making a comeback to the top flight for the next season in 2018–19 Serie A just three seasons after their bankruptcy relegation to Serie D.

On 23 July 2018, Parma were handed a 5 point deduction for the 2018–19 Serie A season, following text messages from Parma player Emanuele Calaio "eliciting a reduced effort" from two players of Spezia (Filippo De Col and Claudio Terzi) during the 2017–18 season, a match Parma won 2–0 to secure promotion. On 9 August, Parma had the 5-point deduction expunged. In the club's first season back in Serie A, they managed to achieve a 14th placed finish on the table, three points above the relegation zone.

For the 2019–20 Serie A season, Parma finished in 11th place with 49 points. Dejan Kulusevski, playing for Parma on loan from Atalanta, won the Best Young Player in Serie A award.

Ahead of the 2020–21 Serie A season, manager Roberto D'Aversa was sacked on 23 August 2020 and replaced by Fabio Liverani. Liverani would only last until 7 January 2021, himself being replaced by his predecessor D'Aversa. Parma finished the season in bottom place, managing just three wins from 38 games and were relegated to Serie B. In September 2020, Parma was purchased by American Kyle Krause.

Enzo Maresca was appointed as the new head coach for the 2021–22 Serie B season. Maresca was sacked on 23 November 2021 and he was replaced by Giuseppe Iachini the same day. Parma finished the season in 12th place. Argentinian midfielder Franco Vázquez was the joint second highest scorer in the league with 14 goals. Fabio Pecchia took over as coach for the 2022–23 Serie B season. Parma was promoted to Serie A in the following season. In the 2024–25 Serie A season, they sacked their manager Fabio Pecchia who managed to promote Parma from Serie B back to Seria A and Cristian Chivu was put in his place. Parma managed to finish 16th in this season.

== Colours and badge ==
Originally, the club wore blue and yellow chequered shirts in honour of the city's traditional colours, which date back to 1545 when the Duchy of Parma was established, but white shirts with a black cross on the chest were introduced after the First World War, drawing inspiration from Juventus' colours, following a name change. White continued to be worn as the main colour of the home kits for much of the remainder of the century, although often complemented with yellow, blue or both, rather than black. The club did, however, experiment in the 1950s with blue shirts and blue and yellow striped shirts. The cross shirts were restored and worn until bankruptcy in 1968, when white shirts with off-centre blue and yellow vertical bands were worn, but the cross returned from 1970 until 1983 when a yellow and blue-sleeved white shirt was introduced and used for 8 years.

After decades in the lower divisions, Parma was promoted to Serie A in 1990, where the side immediately became a major force in the battle for major trophies, on many notable occasions in direct opposition to Juventus, who would become fierce rivals of Parma's. This rivalry and the influence of Parmalat led to the demotion of the white shirts to the away kit, so the side wore yellow and blue hooped shirts at home for six seasons between 1998 and 2004, and navy blue shirts often worn as third choice in this period. This was a time of great success for the club, thus the shirts became synonymous with Parma, often still called the Gialloblù (Yellow and Blues) today, despite a recent reversion to the traditional white shirts emblazoned with a cross caused by parent company Parmalat's collapse and the clubs subsequent re-foundation as Parma Football Club. Yellow and blue were Parma's traditional change colours, used in various combinations from 2004 to 2015, such as vertical stripes, hoops, crosses or as solid colour designs.

Parma's logo changed in 2005 to reflect the name change from Parma A.C. to Parma F.C., but the logo otherwise remained the same, encompassing the city colours of yellow and blue and the club's traditional black cross set on a white background, and has not changed much in years, although it was dramatically overhauled to feature a prancing bull for one season in 2000–01 before it was criticised and discontinued in favour of the old badge. A new badge with broadly similar features was introduced for the 2014–15 season following the use of a commemorative centenary badge for the 2013–14 campaign. The newly formed club in 2015 adopted a new logo before acquiring the rights to a number of legacy items for €250,000 a year later.

Parma F.C.'s crest until 2012

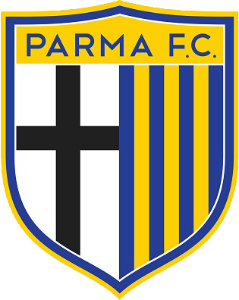
Parma F.C. logo, 2014–15

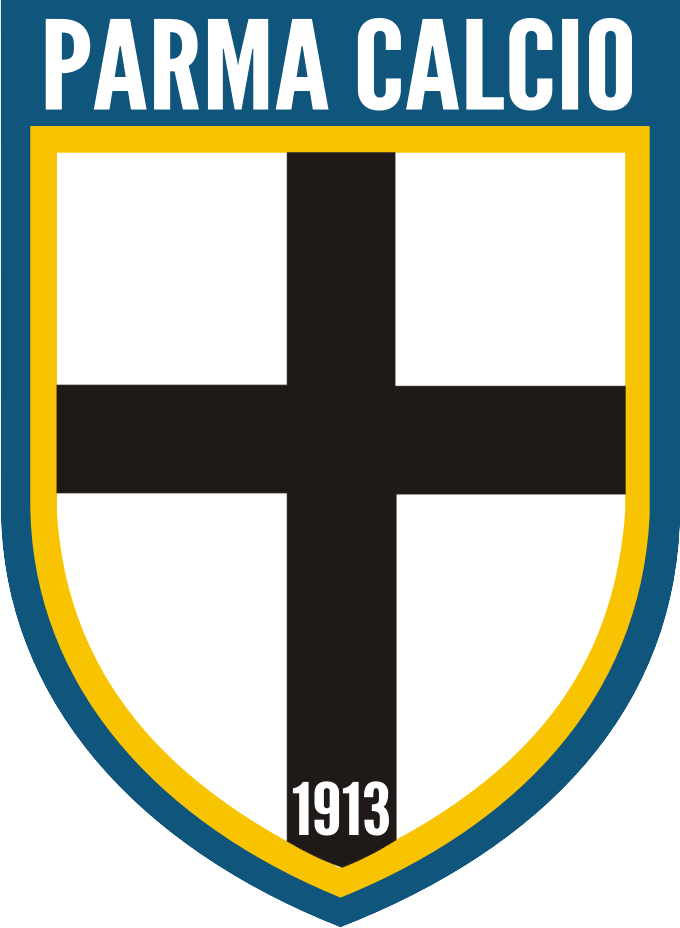
S.S.D. Parma Calcio 1913 badge, 2015–16

=== Kit manufacturers and sponsors ===
Period	Kit manufacturer	Shirt sponsor (main)	Shirt sponsor (secondary)	Shirt sponsor (back)	Shirt sponsor (sleeve)	Shorts sponsor
1913–1974	In-house	None	None	None	None	None
1974–1981	Umbro	None	None	None	None	None
1981–1982	Umbro	Prosciutto di Parma	None	None	None	None
1982–1983	Ennerre	Prosciutto di Parma	None	None	None	None
1983–1987	Umbro	Prosciutto di Parma	None	None	None	None
1987–1995	Umbro	Parmalat	None	None	None	None
1995–1998	Puma	Parmalat	None	None	None	None
1998–1999	Lotto	Parmalat	None	None	None	None
1999–2003	Champion	Parmalat	None	None	None	None
2003–2004	Champion	Parmalat (Matchday 1-19) / Cariparma (20-38)	None	None	None	None
2004–2005	Champion	None	None	None	None	None
2005–2006	Champion / Erreà	Tecnocasa	None	None	None	None
2006–2007	Erreà	Gimoka / Play Radio (Europa League)	Play Radio	None	None	None
2007–2008	Erreà	Kome	Kome (Matchday 2-3) / Il Granchio (13-38)	None	None	None
2008–2009	Erreà	Banca Monte Parma	Metella Trasporti e Logistica	None	None	None
2009–2012	Erreà	Navigare	Banca Monte Parma	None	None	None
2012–2014	Erreà	Folletto	Navigare	None	None	None
2014–2015	Erreà	Folletto	Energy T.I. Group (Matchday 1-28) / SanThè Sant'Anna (29-38)	Various (Note: None (Matchday 1-6, 19-24 & 34) / Piazza Italia (Matchday 7-13 & 16-18) / Bava Srl (14-15) / Risparmio Casa (24) / INC Hotels (25) / Carta Corona (26) / Birra Parma (27) / NordestWash (28) /Dac a trá (29) / Hotel Due Mari Sestri Levante (30) / Ranieri Ship (31 & 36) / Caesars Palace Luxury (32) / CRAI Tirreno (33) / Un Posto al Sole Ristorante (35) / Twin's Cafè (37) / Edil P.3 (38))	None	None
2015–2016	Erreà	Navigare	Folletto	Sky Sport HD	None	COLSER Servizi
2016–2017	Erreà	Aon	Folletto	Viva La Mamma Beretta	None	COLSER Servizi
2017–2018	Erreà	Cetilar	Aon	Viva La Mamma Beretta	None	COLSER Servizi
2018–2019	Erreà	Cetilar	Aon	Viva La Mamma Beretta	Il Valutatore	None
2019–2020	Erreà	Cetilar	Lewer	Viva La Mamma Beretta	Canovi Coperture	None
2020–2021	Erreà	Cetilar	Old Wild West	Viva La Mamma Beretta	Canovi Coperture	None
2021–2022	Erreà	Cetilar	Gravity Sport	EGO Airways	Canovi Coperture	COLSER Servizi
2022–2023	Erreà	Prometeon	Classic Football Shirts	ITCompany	Fontana Viaggi	OARO
2023–2024	Puma	Prometeon	Classic Football Shirts	inX.aero	None	CAD Euro Pool
2024–2025	Puma	Prometeon	AdmiralBet.news	inX.aero	Crédit Agricole Italia	None
2025–	Puma	Prometeon	AdmiralBet.news	Moby Lines	Crédit Agricole Italia	None

== Grounds ==
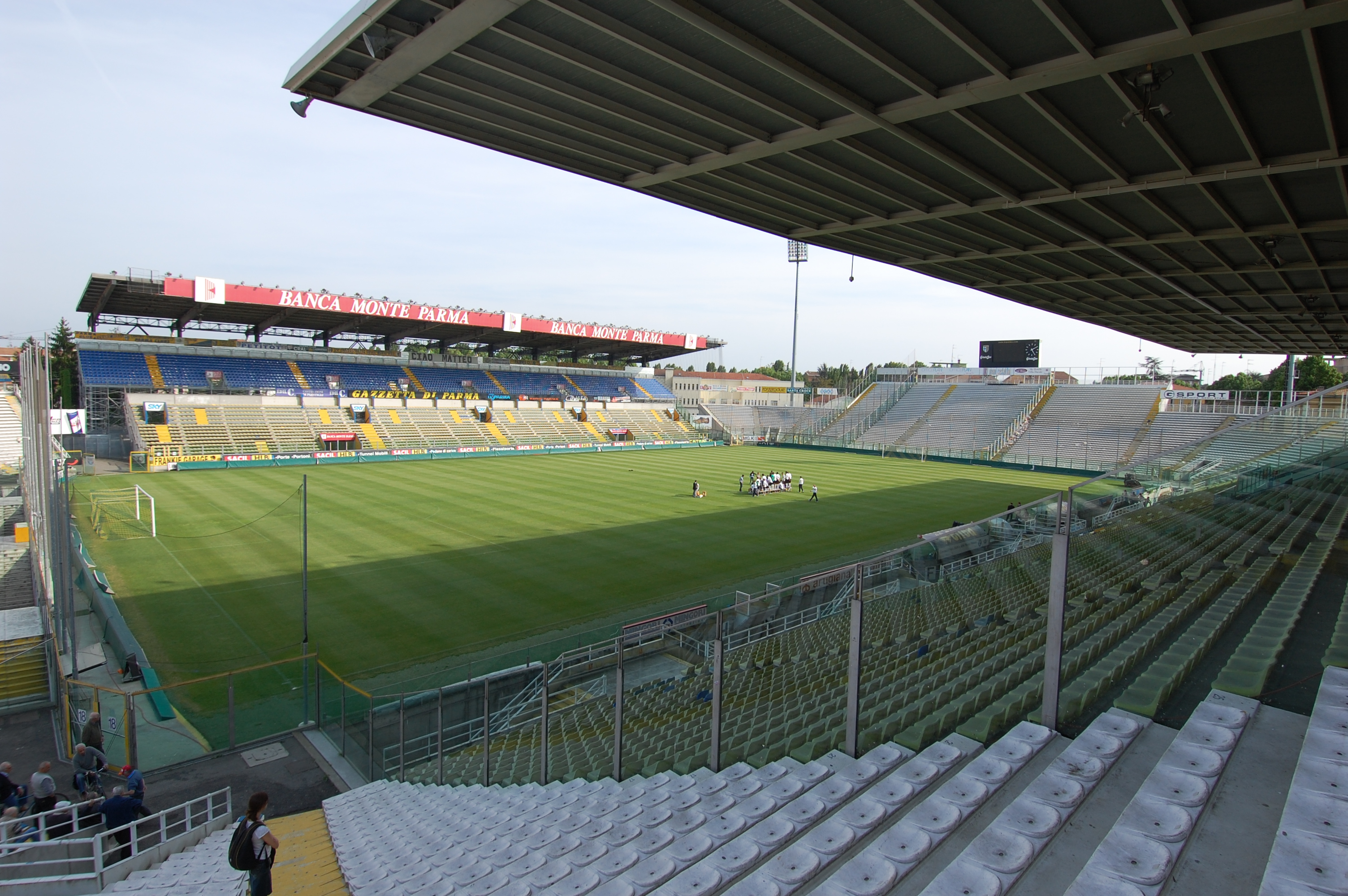
Stadio Ennio Tardini, Parma's home stadium

Parma initially had no permanent home and used the Piazza d'Armi, where two wooden posts constituted the frame of each goal. In December 1914, the club began to use land between the Via Emilia, the Eridania refinery and the Ferraguti factory, but it was sold, so the club returned to the Piazza d'Armi before transferring to the Tre Pioppi, the first fenced-off pitch in the city. Parma moved into the Stadio Ennio Tardini in 1923 and remains there today, although the stadium saw drastic change from the vision of Ennio Tardini, under whose auspices the stadium was to be built, but who died before completion of the venue. Much of the renovation took place after the club's first promotion to Serie A at the start of the 1990s.

Since 1996, the first team has trained and played friendly matches at the Centro Sportivo di Collecchio in Collecchio, which is located 15 kilometres to the south-west of the stadium. Parma's youth teams also play their home matches in the same complex. Until 2015, younger youth teams trained at Campi Stuard but now train at Collechio. In 2018, the refounded Parma Calcio 1913 acquired the centre from the administrator of Eventi Sportivi S.p.A., the parent company of Parma F.C., and the former owner of the centre, for about €3 million.

== Support ==
The coat of arms of the House of Farnese – creators of the Duchy of Parma – whose colours are the inspiration for many of the club's kits

The supporters of Parma are seen as placid fans. Traditionally, they have been seen as fans who enjoy the spectacle of football and are less partisan, although they have been more characterised by impatience of late. The supporters were praised for their loyalty after the club sold more season tickets in 2015 when playing in Serie D than the previous year in Serie A following bankruptcy. In Northeast Italy, the team is the fifth best supported, behind Inter Milan, Juventus, Milan and Bologna, the first three of which are not based in that region. They are represented by three main groups: il Centro di Coordinamento dei Parma Club (which represents most of the fanbase), l'Associazione Petitot and the club's ultras, Boys Parma, which was established on 3 August 1977 by young fans wanting to split from the Centro di Coordinamento and to encourage meetings with opposition fans. The Boys Parma occupy the northern end of the home stadium, La Curva Nord, directly opposite to where the away fans sit in the south stand. In 2008, the Curva Nord was renamed in honour of Boys Parma 1977 member Matteo Bagnaresi, who died when he was run over on the way to the Tardini by a coach which was carrying the opposition Juventus fans. In a not uncommon practice, the number 12 shirt has been reserved for the Parma fans, meaning no player is registered to play with that number on his kit for the club. The implication is that the supporters, particularly those of the famous Curva Nord, are the twelfth man. The last player to be registered with the number was Gabriele Giroli for the 2002–03 season. Parma's club anthem is Il grido di battaglia, which means "The Battle Cry".

=== Rivalries ===
Parma maintains rivalries with regional and national clubs; some of these are keenly fought local derbies. Derby dell'Enza (Note: Derby dell'Enza translates to Enza Derby. The River Enza is an affluence of Italy's longest river, the Po, and forms the boundary of the provinces of Parma and Reggio Emilia.) opponents Reggiana are the club's bitterest rivals. The ill-feeling with Reggiana comes from a traditional city rivalry between Parma and Reggio Emilia. Parma contests the Derby dell'Emilia (Note: Derby d'Emilia would be translated to Emilia Derby. Emilia is a region that approximately corresponds to the western and north-eastern portions of today's Emilia-Romagna. The region takes its name from the Via Aemilia, a Roman road in 187 BCE.) with Bologna. Bologna and Parma are Emilia-Romagna's two most decorated clubs, winning the region's only domestic titles: 7 Serie A titles and 5 Coppe Italia. Two other local derbies are the Derby dei Ducati, (Note: Derby dei Ducati means Derby of the Duchies, the duchies in question being those of Modena and Reggio and Parma. These territories were competing and neighbouring duchies during the Renaissance.) which is contested with neighbours Modena, and the Derby del Ducato, (Note: Derby del Ducato is the Italian equivalent of Derby of the Duchy. The Duchy of Parma was created in 1545 and became the unified Duchies of Parma and Piacenza in 1556.) which is played against Piacenza. Despite their relative obscurity, Lombardian side Cremonese and Tuscan outfit Carrarese, to Parma's north and south, respectively, are both seen as rivals too.

Juventus is considered a great rival of Parma largely due to their recent duels, which include Parma's 1995 UEFA Cup victory, its first and third Coppa Italia triumphs, Supercoppa Italiana defeats in 1995 and 2002, and its 1995 domestic cup final defeat to The Old Lady. These six matches comprise nearly half of the fourteen major finals Parma has participated in. Ironically, Parma's colours have their origins in those Juventus wears, and the switch from white and black to a yellow and blue home kit in the late 1990s took place in order to distance and distinguish Parma from Juventus. Parma maintain keenly fought rivalries with Vicenza and Genoa.

In Italy, it is common for clubs to be twinned in an arrangement called gemellaggi. This is a practice uncommon elsewhere. Parma enjoy amicable relations with Empoli in an arrangement that dates back to a game played in foggy conditions in 1984 that ended in the Parma fans congratulating those of Empoli on its win when the full-time whistle was blown without the Azzurri fans' knowledge. Perhaps a more current bond is felt towards the fans of Sampdoria.

== Ownership and finances ==
In 1991, the club was bought by multinational Italian dairy and food corporation Parmalat. This was the platform for success on the pitch but the club eventually succumbed to administration in 2004 due to Parmalat's massive bankruptcy with debts of $20 billion and fraudulent activity at Parmalat worth over €10 billion and a €167 million net loss by the club in 2003. On 24 January 2007, engineering entrepreneur Tommaso Ghirardi bought the club after three years of administration for $39 million and incorporated Eventi Sportivi as a holding company owning 100% of the club's shares of €20 million nominal value. Eventi Sportivi Srl (later S.p.A.), at first had a share capital of just €3 million, with Banca Monte Parma, owned 10% of the shares as minority. By 21 January 2009, Ghirardi's ownership of Eventi Sportivi was 75% with Banca Monte Parma holding 10% and Marco Ferrari, former vice-president Diego Penocchio and Penocchio's company Brixia Incipit each owning 5%. In July 2011, Ghirardi sold to both Alberto Rossi and Alberto Volpi 5% each of Eventi Sportivi. On 29 February 2014, Energy T.I. Group bought 10% of the shares in the club from Eventi Sportivi.

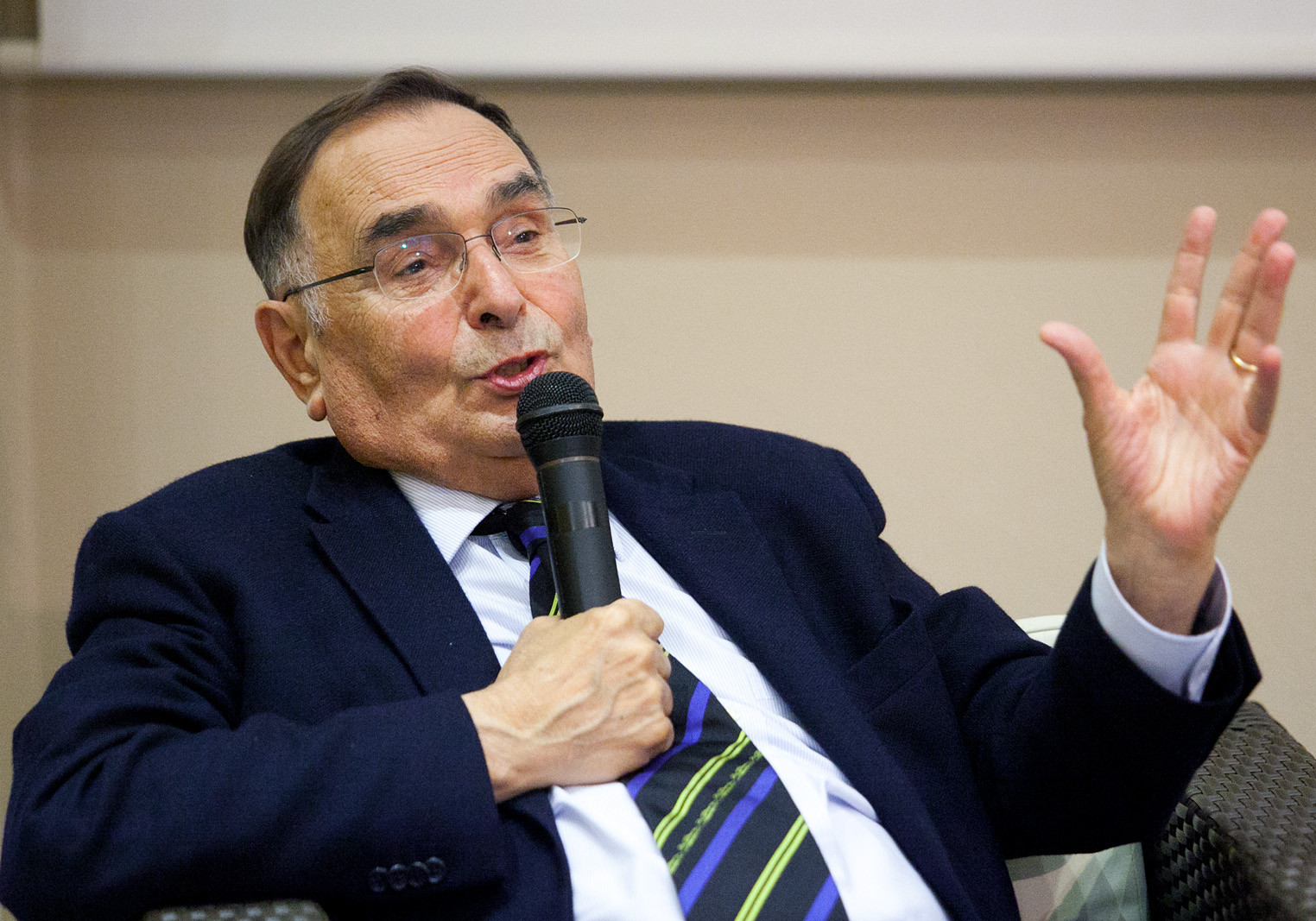
Parma-born motorsport businessman Giampaolo Dallara was a founding investor in S.S.D. Parma Calcio 1913.

On 19 December 2014 and as a result of a ruling which barred the club from a first European campaign under Tommaso Ghirardi, Ghirardi sold his 66.55% controlling stake in Eventi Sportivi to Dastraso Holding Ltd, a company based in Cyprus and controlled by Rezart Taçi for €1, at which point the club was $200 million in debt. The club became the third Serie A club to become foreign-owned as a result and Albanian Emir Kodra was installed as president.

In February 2015, Taci sold his stake to Giampietro Manenti for the price he bought it, €1, less than two months after buying it, at which point salaries at the financially stricken club had not been paid since the previous summer. With Parma bottom of Serie A, Manenti was arrested in March 2015 on allegations of money laundering and his involvement in a credit card fraud ring, imperilling the already precarious situation as the club was plunged further into debt.

On 19 March 2015, the club was declared bankrupt with a total liabilities of €218 million (including unpaid wages of €63 million). On 22 April 2015, the intermediate holding company of Parma, Eventi Sportivi SpA, was also declared bankruptcy by the Tribunal of Parma. The club was then declared legally bankrupt on 22 June 2015 after no new investors willing to refurbish €22.6 million debt in order to trigger Comma 3 of Article 52 of N.O.I.F. to allow the club to remain in Serie B. Other debts of the club were either waived by the footballers or settled by the administrator. New investor was not required to repay the subordinated debt and bank debt of the old company. The medals of Parma, which was owned by the company, as well as Centro Sportivo di Collecchio which was owned by its holding company Eventi Sportivi, were under auction after the bankruptcy.

The phoenix club S.S.D. Parma Calcio 1913 S.r.L. was incorporated in 2015 under the ownership of Nuovo Inizio SrL with share capital of €250,000. Nuovo Inizio was owned by a number of backers including representatives of Parmalat and local businessmen Guido Barilla (co-owner of Barilla Group), Paolo Pizzarotti (president of Impresa Pizzarotti), Mauro Del Rio and Giampaolo Dallara. The new owners sought to overhaul the core philosophy of Italian club ownership and formed Parma Partecipazioni Calcistiche SrL to act as a vehicle for fan ownership, so issued a further €89,286 of shares to that company. Fans therefore own approximately 25% of the club at a cost of €500 per share.

In June 2017, Chinese businessman Jiang Lizhang's Desports group acquired a 60% majority stake in the club. The seven local businessman who launched the club in 2015 retained 30% of the club, while the remaining 10% remained in the hands of fans through Parma Partecipazione Calcistiche. At the end of October 2018 the local Nuovo Inizio group regained control of the club reacquiring 60% of the shares, with the Chinese partners forced to downsize to 30% in light of alleged lack of diligence in meeting their obligations, while 10% remained unchanged in the public company Partecipazioni Calcistiche. On 9 November Parma Calcio held a shareholders' Meeting to appoint a new board of directors, at the end of which Pietro Pizzarotti, at the time vice-president, was appointed the new president of the club.

In 2020, Parma were purchased by the Krause Group, owners of American-based convenience store chain Kum & Go.

Since 2013 the main sponsor is Cetilar by Pharmanutra.

== Players ==
=== Current squad ===
As of 14 September 2026

Note: Flags indicate national team as defined under FIFA eligibility rules; some limited exceptions apply. Players may hold more than one non-FIFA nationality.

No.	Pos.	Nation	Player
3	DF	SEN	Abdoulaye Ndiaye
4	MF	SUI	Vincent Sierro
5	DF	ARG	Lautaro Valenti
7	FW	ESP	Ousmane Diallo
8	MF	USA	Benjamin Cremaschi
9	FW	ARG	David Romero
10	MF	ESP	Adrián Bernabé
11	FW	SWE	Pontus Almqvist
14	DF	ITA	Emanuele Valeri
15	DF	ITA	Enrico Delprato (captain)
16	MF	BEL	Mandela Keita
19	FW	MLI	El Bilal Touré (on loan from Atalanta)
20	FW	CRO	Matija Frigan
22	GK	ITA	Simone Ghidotti

No.	Pos.	Nation	Player
23	FW	FRA	Nesta Elphege
25	FW	ARG	Thomás de Martis (on loan from Lanús)
27	DF	SUI	Sascha Britschgi
29	DF	ARG	Franco Carboni
30	GK	ITA	Giovanni Daffara
32	MF	ARG	Christian Ordóñez
34	DF	BRA	Diego Carlos (on loan from Fenerbache)
37	DF	ARG	Mariano Troilo
40	GK	ITA	Edoardo Corvi
41	MF	ITA	Hans Nicolussi Caviglia
47	MF	SEN	Abdou-Salam Konate
72	DF	SLO	Dominik Drobnič
76	MF	ITA	Simone Lontani
80	MF	ITA	Giovanni Fabbian (on loan from Fiorentina)

=== Parma Primavera ===
As of 22 August 2026

Note: Flags indicate national team as defined under FIFA eligibility rules; some limited exceptions apply. Players may hold more than one non-FIFA nationality.

No.	Pos.	Nation	Player
75	GK	ITA	Alessandro Mazzocchi

=== Out on loan ===
As of 31 August 2026

Note: Flags indicate national team as defined under FIFA eligibility rules; some limited exceptions apply. Players may hold more than one non-FIFA nationality.

No.	Pos.	Nation	Player
—	GK	ITA	Filippo Rinaldi (on loan to Catania until 30 June 2027)
—	DF	DOM	Marlon Mena (on loan to Arezzo until 30 June 2027)
—	DF	ITA	Nicolas Trabucchi (on loan to Dolomiti Bellunesi until 30 June 2027)
—	MF	ITA	Alessandro Cardinali (on loan to Spezia until 30 June 2027)
—	MF	BFA	Rachid Kouda (on loan to Mantova until 30 June 2027)
—	MF	ITA	Elia Plicco (on loan to Sambenedettese until 30 June 2027)
—	MF	DEN	Oliver Sørensen (on loan to Celtic until 30 June 2027)

No.	Pos.	Nation	Player
—	MF	ITA	Edoardo Tigani (on loan to Ospitaletto until 30 June 2027)
—	FW	POL	Mateusz Kowalski (on loan to Dolomiti Bellunesi until 30 June 2027)
—	FW	POL	Daniel Mikołajewski (on loan to Luzern until 30 June 2027)
—	FW	SWE	Jacob Ondrejka (on loan to Groningen until 30 June 2027)
—	FW	LAT	Dario Šits (on loan to Dordrecht until 30 June 2027)
—	FW	MAR	Aymen Zouin (on loan to Casa Pia until 30 June 2027)

=== Retired numbers ===
6 – The club announced the retirement of the shirt number worn by club's captain Alessandro Lucarelli after his retirement announcement. Lucarelli holds the record for league appearances for the club and stayed with the club from its 2015 relegation from Serie A to Serie D following bankruptcy and through its three straight promotions back to Serie A between 2015 and 2018.

12 – From the 2002–03 season until the present (with the exception of the 2015–16 season in Serie D, where league rules required that the number be assigned to a substitute), Curva Nord of the Stadio Ennio Tardini, as a sign of recognition towards the fans who sit in the Curva Nord, considered the 12th man on the pitch.

== Club officials ==
Owner

- (United States) Kyle Krause

Club management

- President: (United States) Kyle Krause

== Coaching staff ==
Position	Name
Head coach	(Italy) Alberto Gilardino
Assistant coach	(Portugal) Rui Sá Lemos
Technical coach	(Spain) Javier Álvarez Aceña
Fitness coach	(Italy) Alberto Pasini
Goalkeeper coach	(Italy) Nicola Pavarini

=== Chairmen history ===
Parma has had numerous chairmen over the course of its history; here is a complete list of them:

Name	Years
Violi, Porcelli and Spaggiari	1913–14
Carlo Melli and Alberto Poletti	1914–15
Ing. Tedeschi	1919–20
Conte L. Lusignani	1920–21
Ennio Tardini	1921–23
Gabbi	1923–24
Giuseppe Muggia and Amoretti	1924–25
Aldo Ortali	1925–26
Giovanni Canali	1926–28
Emilio Grossi	1928–29
Giuseppe Amoretti	1929–30
Cesare Minelli	1930–35
Emilio Grossi	1935–36
Filippo Bonati	1936–37
Nino Medioli	1937–38
Medardo Ghini	1938–40
Giuseppe Scotti	1940–43
Giorgio Zanichelli	1945–46
Raimondo Bortesi	1946–47
Amerigo Ghirardi	1947–48
Bruno Avanzini	1948–51
Bonifazio Lupi di Soragna	1951–53
Umberto Agnetti, Del Frate, Campanini and Viani	1953–54
Fabrizio Cartolari	1954–58

Name	Years
Giuseppe Agnetti	1958–65
Walter Molinari	1965–66
Gino Camorali	1966–67
Vittorio Blarzino	1967–68
Zanichelli and Pizzighoni	1968–69
Ermes Foglia	1969–73
Arnaldo Musini	1973–76
Ernesto Ceresini	1976–90
Fulvio Ceresini	1990
Giorgio Pedraneschi	1990–96
Stefano Tanzi	1996–04
Enrico Bondi	2004
Guido Angiolini	2004–06
Enrico Bondi	2006–07
Tommaso Ghirardi	2007–2014
Pietro Doca	2014
Fabio Giordano	2014–15
Ermir Kodra	2015
Giampietro Manenti	2015
Nevio Scala	2015–2016
Jiang Lizhang	2017–2018
Pietro Pizzarotti	2018–2020
Kyle Krause	2020–present

=== Coaching history ===
Below is a list of Parma coaches since the end of the First World War until the present day.

Name	Nationality	Years
Violi, Porcelli, Spaggiari	(Italy)	1919–20
Percy Humphrey	(England)	1920–21
Adolf Riebe	(Austria)	1921–23
Guido Ara	(Italy)	1923–24
Gabbi, Forlivesi	(Italy)	1924–25
Carlo Achatzi	(Italy)	1925–26
Ghini, Stuardt	(Italy) (Austria)	1926–27
Emilio Grossi	(Italy)	1927–28
Raoul Violi	(Italy)	1928–29
Emilio Grossi	(Italy)	1929–30
Armand Halmos	(Hungary)	1930–31
Emilio Grossi	(Italy)	1931–32
Crotti	(Italy)	1932–33
Tito Mistrali	(Italy)	1933–36
Alfredo Mattioli	(Italy)	1936–37
Elvio Banchero	(Italy)	1937–38
Pál Szalaj	(Hungary)	1938–39
József Wereb	(Hungary)	1939–40
Sam Trevors	(England)	1940–42
Italo Defendi	(Italy)	1942–43
Giuseppe Carlo Ferrari	(Italy)	1945–46
Renato Cattaneo, Lombatti, Frione, Mistrali	(Italy)	1946–47
Bruno Dentelli, Giovanni Mazzoni, Dietrich, Tagliani	(Italy)	1947–48
Renato Cattaneo, Giuberti, Mistrali, Giuseppe Carlo Ferrari, Lombatti, Carlo Rigotti	(Italy)	1948–49

Name	Nationality	Years
Carlo Rigotti	(Italy)	1949–50
Giovanni Mazzoni, Boni, Mattioli	(Italy)	1950–51
Paolo Tabanelli	(Italy)	1951–53
Carlo Alberto Quario	(Italy)	1953–54
Ivo Fiorentini	(Italy)	1954–56
Oliveri, Giuberti	(Italy)	1956–57
Čestmír Vycpálek	(Czech Republic)	1956–58
Guido Mazetti	(Italy)	1958–60
Mario Genta	(Italy)	1960–62
Canforini	(Italy)	1962–63
Diotallevi, Arnaldo Sentimenti	(Italy)	1963–64
Oliveri, Giuberti	(Italy)	1956–57
Bruno Arcari	(Italy)	1964–65
Ivano Corghi	(Italy)	1965–66
Dante Boni	(Italy)	1965–67
Giancarlo Vitali	(Italy)	1967–68
Dante Boni	(Italy)	1968–69
Giancarlo Vitali	(Italy)	1969–70
Stefano Angeleri	(Italy)	1970–72
Antonio Soncini	(Italy)	1972
Giorgio Sereni	(Italy)	1973–74
Renato Gei	(Italy)	1974–75
Giovanni Meregalli	(Italy)	1975–76
Tito Corsi	(Italy)	1976–77
Bruno Mora	(Italy)	1977
Gianni Corelli, Giorgio Visconti	(Italy)	1977–78
Graziano Landoni	(Italy)	1978
Cesare Maldini	(Italy)	1978–80
Domenico Rosati	(Italy)	1980–81
Giorgio Sereni	(Italy)	1981
Giancarlo Danova	(Italy)	1981–83

Name	Nationality	Years
Bruno Mora	(Italy)	1983
Marino Perani	(Italy)	1983–85
Silvano Flaborea	(Italy)	1985
Pietro Carmignani	(Italy)	1985
Arrigo Sacchi	(Italy)	1985–87
Zdeněk Zeman	(Czech Republic)	1987
Giampiero Vitali	(Italy)	1987–89
Nevio Scala	(Italy)	1989–96
Carlo Ancelotti	(Italy)	1996–98
Alberto Malesani	(Italy)	1998–01
Arrigo Sacchi	(Italy)	2001
Renzo Ulivieri	(Italy)	2001
Daniel Passarella	(Argentina)	2001
Pietro Carmignani	(Italy)	2001–02
Cesare Prandelli	(Italy)	2002–04
Silvio Baldini	(Italy)	2004–05
Pietro Carmignani	(Italy)	2005
Mario Beretta	(Italy)	2005–06
Stefano Pioli	(Italy)	2006–07
Claudio Ranieri	(Italy)	2007
Domenico Di Carlo	(Italy)	2007–08
Héctor Cúper	(Argentina)	2008
Andrea Manzo	(Italy)	2008
Luigi Cagni	(Italy)	2008
Francesco Guidolin	(Italy)	2008–10
Pasquale Marino	(Italy)	2010–11
Franco Colomba	(Italy)	2011–12
Roberto Donadoni	(Italy)	2012–15
Luigi Apolloni	(Italy)	2015–16
Roberto D'Aversa	(Italy)	2016–20
Fabio Liverani	(Italy)	2020–21
Roberto D'Aversa	(Italy)	2021
Enzo Maresca	(Italy)	2021
Giuseppe Iachini	(Italy)	2021–22
Fabio Pecchia	(Italy)	2022–25
Cristian Chivu	(Romania)	2025
Carlos Cuesta	(Spain)	2025–26
Alberto Gilardino	(Italy)	2026–

== Honours ==
Parma has won eight major titles in its history, all coming in a period of ten years between 1992 and 2002. These honours make it the eleventh most successful team in Italian football history in terms of the number of major trophies won, the fourth most successful Italian team in European competitions (after AC Milan, Juventus and Inter Milan), and one of thirteen Italian clubs to have won multiple major titles.

=== National ===
==== League ====
- Serie A
  - Runners-up: 1996–97
- Serie B
  - Winners: 2023–24
  - Runners-up: 2008–09, 2017–18
- Serie C
  - Winners: 1953–54, 1972–73, (Note: At the time, this was one of 3 parallel regional third tier divisions.) 1983–84, (Note: At the time, this was one of 2 parallel regional third tier divisions.) 1985–86
- Serie D
  - Winners: 1969–70, 2015–16 (Note: At the time, this was one of 9 parallel regional fourth tier divisions.)

==== Cups ====
- Coppa Italia
  - Winners: 1991–92, 1998–99, 2001–02
  - Runners-up: 1994–95, 2000–01
- Supercoppa Italiana
  - Winners: 1999
  - Runners-up: 1992, 1995, 2002

=== European ===
- UEFA Cup
  - Winners: 1994–95, 1998–99
- European Cup Winners' Cup
  - Winners: 1992–93
  - Runners-up: 1993–94
- European Super Cup
  - Winners: 1993

=== Others ===
- Parmalat Cup
  - Winners: 1995
- Trofeo Colombino
  - Winners: 2007

== Divisional movements ==
Series	Years	Last	Promotions	Relegations
A	30	2026–27	-	▼4 (1926, 2008, 2015✟, 2021)
B	30	2023–24	▲5 (1925, 1990, 2009, 2018, 2024)	▼6 (1932, 1949, 1965, 1975, 1980, 1985)
C	30	2016–17	▲7 (1946, 1954, 1973, 1979, 1984, 1986, 2017)	▼1 (1966)
90 out of 95 years of professional football in Italy since 1929
D	5	2015–16	▲2 (1970, 2016)	never

== Bibliography ==
- Bellè, Gianfranco; Gandolfi, Giorgio (2003). 90 anni del Parma calcio 1913–2003 [90 Years of Parma Football 1913–2003] (in Italian). Parma: Azzali Editore.
- Dunford, Martin (1 March 2011). The Rough Guide to Italy (10th ed.). Rough Guides. ISBN 978-1-84836-717-3.
- Giulianotti, Richard (16 August 1999). Football: a sociology of the global game. Polity Press. ISBN 978-0-333-94612-1.
- Melegari, Fabrizio, ed. (2007). Calciatori del Parma (I Crociati nelle figurine Panini) [Parma Players (The Crusaders in Panini Trading Cards)] (in Italian). Modena: Panini Group.
- Morrow, Stephen (30 September 2003). The people's game?: football, finance, and society. Palgrave Macmillan. ISBN 978-0-333-94612-1.
- Sappino, Marco (2000). Dizionario del calcio italiano [Dictionary of Italian football] (in Italian). Vol. 2. Baldini & Castoldi. ISBN 978-88-8089-862-7.
