= 2010–11 Parma FC season =

Parma
2010–11 season
- President: Tommaso Ghirardi
- Head coach: Pasquale Marino (until 3 April 2011); Franco Colomba (from 5 April 2011)
- Stadium: Stadio Ennio Tardini
- Serie A: 12th
- Coppa Italia: Quarter-finals
- Top goalscorer: League: Hernán Crespo (9); All: Hernán Crespo (11)
- Highest home attendance: 19,615, vs. Milan
- Lowest home attendance: 3,567, vs. Fiorentina
- Average home league attendance: 14,157
Home colours	Away colours	Third colours

The 2010–11 season of Parma F.C. was Parma's 20th season and 2nd consecutive season in Serie A, having finished in 8th position in the previous season. The club was embroiled in a relegation dogfight for much of the season, but managed to secure their place in Serie A for the following year on 8 May with two games to spare. As well as competing in Serie A as one of twenty teams, Parma took part in the 2010–11 edition of the Coppa Italia but were eliminated by Palermo at the quarter-final stage. Parma started the season with a new head coach after Francesco Guidolin resigned from the post in late May as he was appointed by Udinese. His successor, Pasquale Marino, who was also Guidolin's predecessor at Udinese, was announced as head coach on 2 June 2010, but was sacked with seven games of the season left on 3 April 2011. He was replaced by Franco Colomba two days later. Colomba's arrival brought about a dramatic improvement in results and led to what turned out to be comfortably achieved safety.

== Kits ==
Supplier: Erreà
Sponsor(s): Navigare and Banca Monte Parma

Home	Home alt.	Away	Away alt.	Third	Pre-season

Source: fcparma.com

== Pre-season ==
=== Results ===
Kick-off times are in CET.

Win Draw Loss

17 July 2010 Friendly	Levico	0–8	Parma	Levico Terme
		Report	29' A. Lucarelli; 31', 34' Paonessa; 44' Antonelli; 51', 86' Crespo; 74' Morrone; 84' Rispoli	Attendance: 400; Referee: Alberto Marchetti

21 July 2010 Friendly	Parma	2–0	Feralpi Salò	Levico Terme
	Valiani 40'; Antonelli 90'	Report		Attendance: 400; Referee: Alberto Marchetti

22 July 2010 Friendly	Parma	8–0	Borgo	Borgo Valsugana
	Rispoli 13'; C. Lucarelli 21'; Paonessa 24'; Antonelli 58'; Paloschi 60'; Mandorlini 70'; Crespo 83', 85'	Report		Attendance: 400; Referee: Tommaso Battaglia

25 July 2010 Friendly	Parma	3–1	SPAL	Levico Terme
	Bojinov 44', 56', 60'	Report	10' Cipriani	Attendance: 400; Referee: Daniele Bindoni

29 July 2010 Friendly	Parma	1–2	Al Sadd	Levico Terme
17:00	Bojinov 53' (pen.)	Report	1', 28' Silva	Attendance: 300

5 August 2010 Friendly	Parma	1–1	Racing de Santander	Stadio Ennio Tardini, Parma
	Marqués 80' (pen.)	Report	89' (pen.) Bolado	Attendance: 3,890; Referee: Andrea Gervasoni

6 August 2010 45-minute friendly	Chievo	0–0 (5–4 p)	Parma	Stadio Dino Manuzzi, Cesena
20:30 CEST		Report		Attendance: 3,240; Referee: Nicola Rizzoli
	Penalties
	Iori (penalty scored); Bogliacino (penalty scored); Granoche (penalty scored); Mantovani (penalty scored); Marcolini (penalty scored)		(penalty scored) Marqués; (penalty scored) Zé Eduardo; (penalty missed) Bojinov; (penalty scored) Paci; (penalty scored) Valiani

6 August 2010 45-minute friendly	Cesena	1–1 (4–1 p)	Parma	Stadio Dino Manuzzi, Cesena
21:45 CEST	Giaccherini 19'		Paletta 32'	Attendance: 3,240; Referee: Andrea Romeo
	Penalties
	Colucci (penalty scored); Giaccherini (penalty scored); Malonga (penalty scored); Do Prado (penalty scored)		(penalty missed) Galloppa; (penalty scored) Paonessa; (penalty missed) C. Lucarelli

10 August 2010 Friendly	Parma	1–1	Shakhtar Donetsk	Stadio Ennio Tardini, Parma
20:30	Paonessa 75'	Report	51' Moreno	Attendance: 2,324; Referee: Christian Brighi

15 August 2010 Friendly	Lucchese	1–2	Parma	Stadio Porta Elisa, Lucca
	Biggi 35'	Report	60' Castellini; 89' Paloschi	Referee: Claudio Bietolini

22 August 2010 Trofeo Costa del Sol	Málaga	2–1	Parma	Estadio La Rosaleda, Málaga
	Weligton 58'; Edinho 80'	Report	47' Giovinco	Referee: Antonio Rubinos Pérez

4 September 2010 Friendly	Colorno	1–5	Parma	Colorno
15:30 CEST	Fiorasi 30'		19', 79' Crespo; 26' Marqués; 41' Giovinco; 50' Candreva	Referee: Matteo Bolsi

9 September 2010 Friendly	Parma	8–0	Medesanese
	Crespo 5', 29', 42'; Marchignoli 8' (o.g.); Marqués 23'; Giovinco 57'; Bojinov 85'; Candreva 89'			Referee: Niccolò Tolentini

== Serie A ==
=== Summary ===
Without injured Daniele Galloppa, who was ruled out until the new year, Parma opened their season on the last Sunday of August with 2–0 victory over newly promoted Brescia. Valeri Bojinov opened the scoring after just ten minutes when, having played a short pass to débutant Sebastian Giovinco on the edge of the box, was returned the ball after a chipped Giovinco ball over the defence, which beat the offside trap and left the previous season's top scorer Bojinov through on goal. The second goal came on the stroke of half-time through Stefano Morrone, who was left a simple tap-in after a far post header from Alessandro Lucarelli off a lofted free-kick set him up. Parma's second league game of the season involved a trip off the mainland to Catania, where a goal in either half saw off Parma's challenge despite a late goal from Giovinco, but the match ended in regrettable style as Lucarelli was given his marching orders for a second yellow card. Parma then secured consecutive 1–1 draws, first at home to Genoa and then away to Lecce, in very similar fashion as the opposition took the lead through a first-half penalty before Parma drew level halfway through the second half. Two difficult games – away to Fiorentina and at home to A.C. Milan – ended in defeat as Parma slipped into the relegation zone with two- and one-goal reverses respectively, the latter after a spectacular 30-yard strike from Andrea Pirlo. Remarkably, Parma gave away a penalty for four consecutive matches before the run was ended against Milan. Parma went rock-bottom in Serie A after their seventh league game and a 1–1 draw against Cesena as Cristian Zaccardo scored his second league goal of the season, despite having the better of the match. Consecutive goalless draws at home to Roma and Chievo lifted the club out of the relegation zone but prompted sporting director Pietro Leonardi to offer public support to head coach Pasquale Marino. Bizarrely, in the lead-up to the Roma match on 24 October, Parma's fans protested against the lunchtime kick-off by the simultaneous consumption of sandwiches.

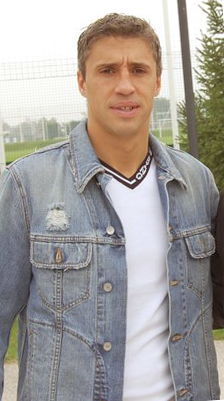
Club legend Hernán Crespo enjoyed something of an early winter renaissance as the 35-year-old managed five goals in three games in late November and early December.

Parma then slipped back to eighteenth position after an Edinson Cavani brace saw Napoli comfortably overcome a Parma side without a win since the opening day of the season, which led to president Tommaso Ghirardi demanding improvement. Parma then beat Sampdoria at home in thick fog and A.S. Bari away by a solitary goal to nil to shoot up to fourteenth position and ease pressure on Marino, the latter including a wonderful goal from Antonio Candreva. Parma secured a respectable draw at home to early season pace-setters Lazio the next week as ex-Lazio star Hernán Crespo opened the scoring for Parma, netting his 65th league goal for the club, before Luca Antonelli's own goal cancelled it out on the stroke of half-time. Next up were reigning champions Internazionale who beat Parma by five goals to two, overcoming an early Hernán Crespo brace, who was again scoring against former employers. The Argentinian striker was again on the scoresheet the following week as former manager Francesco Guidolin returned to Il Tardini for the first time since his summer departure, opening the scoring from the penalty spot with 24 minutes played before Udinese's Antonio Di Natale equalised 11 minutes later. Crespo then put his team back in front for good early in the second half as Parma won 2–1 and scoring his 150th Serie goal. The following week, Parma travelled to Palermo and took the lead inside ten minutes as Alessandro Lucarelli found the net. Parma then surrendered their lead and three second half goals from the Rosanero were enough to see Parma off and the match finished 3–1. The Ducali rounded off their pre-Christmas schedule with home match against rivals Bologna, who proved to be stubborn opposition in a goalless draw.

Parma started 2011 in perfect fashion, overcoming biggest rivals Juventus away from home by a scoreline of four goals to one in the Turin club's first sell-out of the season. Juventus' Felipe Melo was sent off early on before two goals from Juve loanee Giovinco, a penalty from Crespo and a late goal from new signing (co-owned by Juve) Raffaele Palladino were bisected by a Legrottaglie header. A disappointing result followed as Parma succumbed to a home defeat, conceding goals five and six of the season at home as they went down by two goals to one to Cagliari. Long-serving defender Massimo Paci was given his marching orders in the first half of the following match away to Brescia as Parma lost by two goals to nil. After two straight defeats, Parma then returned to winning ways with a two-nil victory over Catania after second half goals from Candreva and Giovinco within minutes of each other. Two straight defeats followed, firstly 3–1 away to Genoa, whom Parma helped to their first home win since November as an early penalty was cancelled out by a Crespo strike, but atoned for by a Paletta own goal and a close-range Kaladze goal on the stroke of half-time, and secondly 1–0 at home to fellow strugglers Lecce at the start of February in a match which Parma dominated but lost in injury time. The losing run was halted the next week as Parma hosted Fiorentina and a first goal for winter transfer window loan signing Amauri scored. His goal was cancelled out by a second half penalty and the match ended one apiece. Parma were then handed a four-nil thrashing by league leaders Milan, extending Parma's winless streak to four matches Parma's next match was a relegation dogfight against Cesena. In an eventful ninety minutes, Parma came from behind twice to draw the match two-all. Parma then travelled to the Stadio Olimpico to face Roma and gave away a penalty and a goal from a corner to trail by two goals at half-time. A second-half Amauri brace saw Parma level the scoreline and the match finished 2–2. As pressure grew on head coach Pasquale Marino, a third consecutive draw followed; this time it a goalless draw away to Chievo. Gabriel Paletta was sent off late in the second half in an otherwise uneventful affair.

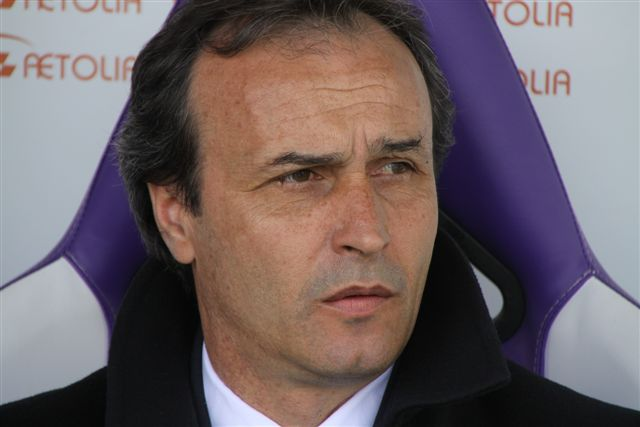
Pasquale Marino, appointed as Parma's head coach in the wake of Francesco Guidolin's departure in the summer of 2010, saw his tenure ended early on 3 April 2011 after a disappointing season.

Parma's dismal winless run extended to 8 games as they lost to Napoli by three goals to one. Parma opened the scoring through Raffaele Palladino, but Napoli hit back with three goals in a second half that yet again saw a Parma player sent off; this time it was Daniele Galloppa. Parma finally ended their winless streak and boosted their survival chances on 20 March 2011, overcoming fellow relegation battlers Sampdoria with a solitary goal midway through the second half. The following week, a 2–1 defeat at home to Bari in a match that Parma dominated was enough to see head coach Pasquale Marino lose his job with Parma two points clear of the relegation zone. He was replaced by Franco Colomba, who was signed on a 14-month deal and had been out of a job since the previous summer, two days later. Colomba's first match in charge, a tricky trip to Rome to face Champions League qualification-chasing Lazio ended in defeat by two goals to nil, a goal coming in each half. On 16 April, national and continental and world champions Internazionale paid a visit to the Tardini, as Parma recorded a historic two-goal victory with goals from Juventus loanees Giovinco and Amauri. The next week, a second consecutive 2–0 win – their first in Udine since 2001 – over ten-man Udinese thanks to two Amauri goals boosted Parma's chances of salvation, but other relegation candidates' result meant the club remained just three points clear of the relegation zone. Parma faced Europe-chasing Palermo on 1 May and recorded yet another win at home. Two early first-half goals saw Parma lead 2–0 before a second half Palermo goal put Parma on edge. Two minutes from time, Antonio Candreva restored Parma's two-goal lead and confirmed Parma's first three-game winning streak of the season. Six points clear of the relegation zone with just three games remaining, Parma looked to have secured their participation in Serie A for the following season. Parma then travelled to meet Bologna in the Emilian Derby the following weekend, with both sides knowing that three points would secure their Serie A status for the season to come. The match ended goalless and results in other matches meant that relegation could not be ruled out at the final whistle, but a late goal in a later game saw Genoa defeat Sampdoria in the Derby della Lanterna, confirming Parma's place in next year's Serie A. Parma celebrated their safety in style in the Stadio Ennio Tardini the week after with a win over injury-hit bitterest rivals Juventus, the only goal of the game coming from the man on loan from Juventus, Sebastian Giovinco, who had scored two goals in the reverse fixture and secured Colomba's fourth win in six games. The season ended in a low-key affair away to Cagliari. Valeri Bojinov opened the scoring for Parma before a Rolf Feltscher own goal levelled the scoreline, as Parma finished the league season in twelfth position.

=== Results ===
Kick-off times are in CET.

Win Draw Loss

29 August 2010 Round 1	Parma	2–0	Brescia	Stadio Ennio Tardini, Parma
20:45 CET	Bojinov 10'; Morrone 45+3'	Report		Attendance: 12,799; Referee: Antonio Damato

12 September 2010 Round 2	Catania	2–1	Parma	Stadio Angelo Massimino, Catania
15:00 CET	Mascara 12' (pen.); Antenucci 82' (pen.)	Report	90+1' Giovinco	Attendance: 11,000; Referee: Dino Tommasi

19 September 2010 Round 3	Parma	1–1	Genoa	Stadio Ennio Tardini, Parma
15:00 CET	Zaccardo 72'	Report	28' (pen.) Toni	Attendance: 18,756; Referee: Nicola Rizzoli

22 September 2010 Round 4	Lecce	1–1	Parma	Stadio Via del Mare, Lecce
20:45 CET	Jeda 31' (pen.)	Report	69' Crespo	Attendance: 7,957; Referee: Christian Brighi

26 September 2010 Round 5	Fiorentina	2–0	Parma	Stadio Artemio Franchi, Florence
15:00 CET	Ljajić 61' (pen.); De Silvestri 76'	Report		Attendance: 21,126; Referee: Andrea Romeo

2 October 2010 Round 6	Parma	0–1	Milan	Stadio Ennio Tardini, Parma
20:45 CET		Report	25' Pirlo	Attendance: 19,615; Referee: Daniele Orsato

17 October 2010 Round 7	Cesena	1–1	Parma	Stadio Dino Manuzzi, Cesena
15:00 CET	Bogdani 17'	Report	28' Zaccardo	Attendance: 14,292; Referee: Emidio Morganti

24 October 2010 Round 8	Parma	0–0	Roma	Stadio Ennio Tardini, Parma
12:30 CET		Report		Attendance: 13,937; Referee: Luca Banti

31 October 2010 Round 9	Parma	0–0	Chievo	Stadio Ennio Tardini, Parma
15:00 CET		Report		Attendance: 13,647; Referee: Paolo Tagliavento

7 November 2010 Round 10	Napoli	2–0	Parma	Stadio San Paolo, Naples
15:00 CET	Cavani 19', 86'	Report		Attendance: 46,000; Referee: Paolo Silvio Mazzoleni

10 November 2010 Round 11	Parma	1–0	Sampdoria	Stadio Ennio Tardini, Parma
20:45 CET	Bojinov 84'	Report		Attendance: 13,319; Referee: Sebastiano Peruzzo

14 November 2010 Round 12	Bari	0–1	Parma	Stadio San Nicola, Bari
15:00 CET		Report	33' Candreva	Attendance: 18,000; Referee: Christian Brighi

21 November 2010 Round 13	Parma	1–1	Lazio	Stadio Ennio Tardini, Parma
15:00 CET	Crespo 23'	Report	45' Floccari	Attendance: 14,062; Referee: Nicola Rizzoli

28 November 2010 Round 14	Inter	5–2	Parma	San Siro, Milan
12:30 CET	Stanković 18', 19', 75'; Cambiasso 23'; Motta 72'	Report	4', 36' Crespo	Attendance: 40,000; Referee: Antonio Giannoccaro

5 December 2010 Round 15	Parma	2–1	Udinese	Stadio Ennio Tardini, Parma
15:00 CET	Crespo 24' (pen.), 55'	Report	35' Di Natale	Attendance: 12,267; Referee: Domenico Celi

11 December 2010 Round 16	Palermo	3–1	Parma	Stadio Renzo Barbera, Palermo
18:00 CET	Pinilla 51'; Miccoli 61'; Zaccardo 89' (o.g.)	Report	7' A. Lucarelli	Attendance: 22,817; Referee: Gabriele Gava

19 December 2010 Round 17	Parma	0–0	Bologna	Stadio Ennio Tardini, Parma
15:00 CET		Report		Attendance: 13,265; Referee: Carmine Russo

6 January 2011 Round 18	Juventus	1–4	Parma	Stadio Olimpico di Torino, Turin
12:30 CET	Legrottaglie 56'	Report	41', 48' Giovinco; 62' (pen.) Crespo; 90+3' Palladino	Attendance: 23,873; Referee: Andrea De Marco

9 January 2011 Round 19	Parma	1–2	Cagliari	Stadio Ennio Tardini, Parma
15:00 CET	Giovinco 53'	Report	22', 31' Acquafresca	Attendance: 12,185; Referee: Renzo Candussio

16 January 2011 Round 20	Brescia	2–0	Parma	Stadio Mario Rigamonti, Brescia
15:00 CET	Bega 45'; Diamanti 88'	report		Referee: Mauro Bergonzi

22 January 2011 Round 21	Parma	2–0	Catania	Stadio Ennio Tardini, Parma
18:00 CET	Candreva 56'; Giovinco 62'	Report		Attendance: 12,372; Referee: Sebastiano Peruzzo

30 January 2011 Round 22	Genoa	3–1	Parma	Stadio Luigi Ferraris, Genoa
15:00 CET	Palacio 16' (pen.); Paletta 44' (o.g.); Kaladze 45'	Report	32' Crespo	Referee: Nicola Pierpaoli

2 February 2011 Round 23	Parma	0–1	Lecce	Stadio Ennio Tardini, Parma
20:45 CET		Report	90+2' Chevantón	Attendance: 11,975; Referee: Carmine Russo

6 February 2011 Round 24	Parma	1–1	Fiorentina	Stadio Ennio Tardini, Parma
15:00 CET	Amauri 15'	Report	49' D'Agostino	Attendance: 13,588; Referee: Gabriele Gava

12 February 2011 Round 25	Milan	4–0	Parma	San Siro, Milan
18:00 CET	Seedorf 8'; Cassano 17'; Robinho 61', 65'	Report		Referee: Andrea De Marco

20 February 2011 Round 26	Parma	2–2	Cesena	Stadio Ennio Tardini, Parma
15:00 CET	Crespo 64' (pen.); Palladino 89'	Report	31' Rosina; 79' Sammarco	Attendance: 14,095; Referee: Paolo Tagliavento

27 February 2011 Round 27	Roma	2–2	Parma	Stadio Olimpico, Rome
15:00 CET	Totti 19' (pen.); Juan 36'	Report	74', 79' Amauri	Referee: Christian Brighi

6 March 2011 Round 28	Chievo	0–0	Parma	Stadio Marc'Antonio Bentegodi, Verona
15:00 CET		Report		Referee: Daniele Orsato

13 March 2011 Round 29	Parma	1–3	Napoli	Stadio Ennio Tardini, Parma
20:45 CET	Palladino 29'	Report	52' Hamšík; 87' Maggio; 56' Lavezzi	Attendance: 16,273; Referee: Emidio Morganti

20 March 2011 Round 30	Sampdoria	0–1	Parma	Stadio Luigi Ferraris, Genoa
15:00 CET		Report	65' Zaccardo	Referee: Paolo Valeri

3 April 2011 Round 31	Parma	1–2	Bari	Stadio Ennio Tardini, Parma
15:00 CET	Amauri 80'	Report	64' Parisi; 90+2' Álvarez	Attendance: 18,347; Referee: Nicola Pierpaoli

10 April 2011 Round 32	Lazio	2–0	Parma	Stadio Olimpico, Rome
15:00 CET	Hernanes 23'; Floccari 77'	Report		Referee: Paolo Silvio Mazzoleni

16 April 2011 Round 33	Parma	2–0	Inter	Stadio Ennio Tardini, Parma
20:45 CET	Giovinco 35'; Amauri 85'	Report		Attendance: 17,504; Referee: Gianluca Rocchi

23 April 2011 Round 34	Udinese	0–2	Parma	Stadio Friuli, Udine
15:00 CET		Report	13', 90+1' Amauri	Referee: Paolo Valeri

1 May 2011 Round 35	Parma	3–1	Palermo	Stadio Ennio Tardini, Parma
15:00 CET	Džemaili 2'; Modesto 18'; Candreva 89'	Report	56' Pastore	Attendance: 14,315; Referee: Domenico Celi

8 May 2011 Round 36	Bologna	0–0	Parma	Stadio Renato Dall'Ara, Bologna
15:00 CET		Report		Referee: Mauro Bergonzi

15 May 2010 Round 37	Parma	1–0	Juventus	Stadio Ennio Tardini, Parma
15:00 CET	Giovinco 64'	Report		Attendance: 17,259; Referee: Sebastiano Peruzzo

22 May 2010 Round 38	Cagliari	1–1	Parma	Stadio Sant'Elia, Cagliari
18:00 CET	Feltscher 55' (o.g.)	Report	34' Bojinov	Referee: Massimiliano Velotto

=== Statistics ===
==== Standings ====
Pos	Team	Pld	W	D	L	GF	GA	GD	Pts
10	Genoa	38	14	9	15	45	47	−2	51 (Note: Fiorentina finished ahead of Genoa on head-to-head points: Fiorentina 1–0 Genoa, Genoa 1–1 Fiorentina.)
11	ChievoVerona	38	11	13	14	38	40	−2	46 (Note: Chievo finished ahead of Parma and Catania on head-to-head points: Chievo: 6 pts, Parma: 5 pts, Catania: 4 pts.)
12	Parma	38	11	13	14	39	47	−8	46
13	Catania	38	12	10	16	40	52	−12	46
14	Cagliari	38	12	9	17	44	51	−7	45

Source: Lega Serie A
Rules for classification: 1) points; 2) head-to-head points; 3) head-to-head goal difference; 4) head-to-head goals scored; 5) goal difference; 6) number of goals scored.

==== Results summary ====
Overall								Home						Away					
Pld	W	D	L	GF	GA	GD	Pts	W	D	L	GF	GA	GD	W	D	L	GF	GA	GD
38	11	13	14	39	47	−8	46	7	7	5	21	16	+5	4	6	9	18	31	−13

==== Results by round ====
Round	1	2	3	4	5	6	7	8	9	10	11	12	13	14	15	16	17	18	19	20	21	22	23	24	25	26	27	28	29	30	31	32	33	34	35	36	37	38
Ground	H	A	H	A	A	H	A	H	H	A	H	A	H	A	H	A	H	A	H	A	H	A	H	H	A	H	A	A	H	A	H	A	H	A	H	A	H	A
Result	W	L	D	D	L	L	D	D	D	L	W	W	D	L	W	L	D	W	L	L	W	L	L	D	L	D	D	D	L	W	L	L	W	W	W	D	W	D
Position	2	8	12	10	16	18	20	20	17	18	16	14	14	15	15	16	16	11	14	14	12	15	15	15	15	15	16	15	16	14	16	17	16	14	13	14	12	12

Source: Serie A
A = Away; H = Home; W = Win; D = Draw; L = Loss

== Coppa Italia ==
=== Summary ===
Parma entered the competition at the Round of 16 as the rules of the tournament dictated that, alongside those teams which qualified for Europe for the 2010–11 season, the highest finisher in Serie A who failed to qualify for European football would begin competing at that advanced stage. As the entirety of the tournament is pre-drawn, Parma knew the identity of the ten teams that would fight for the right to play away at the Ennio Tardini in the Round of 16 in the first four preliminary rounds. These were Santegidiese, Trapani, AlzanoCene, Reggiana, SPAL, Alessandria, all of whom competed from the First Round; Reggina, Frosinone, Empoli, all of whom competed from the Second Round; and Fiorentina, who competed from the Third Round. It transpired that Fiorentina – the only Serie A team in the section – emerged as Parma's opponents. The match remained goalless for 114 minutes until Fiorentina broke the deadlock through Mario Santana. Crespo equalised for Parma just a minute later and then scored another three minutes from time to take Parma through to the quarter-finals, where they faced Palermo away from home in the last week of January. The sides played out 120 minutes of goalless football before Palermo emerged victorious in a penalty shoot-out as Francesco Valiani missed the decisive penalty.

=== Results ===
Kick-off times are in CET.

Win Draw Loss

14 December 2010 Round of 16	Parma	2–1 (a.e.t.)	Fiorentina	Stadio Ennio Tardini, Parma
21:00 CET	Crespo 115', 117'	Report	114' Santana	Attendance: 3,567; Referee: Paolo Mazzoleni

25 January 2011 Quarter-finals	Palermo	0–0 (a.e.t.) (5–4 p)	Parma	Stadio Renzo Barbera, Palermo
21:00 CET		Report		Attendance: 15,335; Referee: Christian Brighi
	Penalties
	Cassani (penalty missed); Bovo (penalty scored); Balzaretti (penalty scored); Nocerino (penalty scored); Pastore (penalty scored); Jara Martínez (penalty scored)		(penalty missed) Crespo; (penalty scored) Palladino; (penalty scored) Modesto; (penalty scored) Candreva; (penalty scored) Giovinco; (penalty missed) Valiani

== Player statistics ==
No.	Pos.	Name	Serie A		Coppa Italia		Total		Discipline	
No.	Pos.	Name	Apps	Goals	Apps	Goals	Apps	Goals	Yellow card	Red card
1	GK	(Italy) Nicola Pavarini	2(1)	0	2	0	4(1)	0	1	0
2	DF	(Venezuela) Rolf Feltscher	2(1)	0	0	0	2(1)	0	0	0
3	DF	(Italy) Luca Antonelli	12	0	0	0	12	0	1	0
4	MF	(Italy) Stefano Morrone (captain)	30(4)	1	2	0	32(4)	1	5	0
5	DF	(Italy) Cristian Zaccardo	34	3	2	0	36	3	8	0
6	DF	(Italy) Alessandro Lucarelli (3rd captain)	32	1	1(1)	0	33(1)	1	11	1
7	MF	(Italy) Antonio Candreva	23(8)	3	2	0	25(8)	3	4	0
8	MF	(Spain) Fernando Marqués	12(1)	0	1	0	13(1)	0	1	0
9	FW	(Argentina) Hernán Crespo (4th captain)	16(13)	9	0(2)	2	16(15)	11	2	0
10	MF	(Switzerland) Blerim Džemaili	26(4)	1	1	0	27(4)	1	11	2
11	FW	(Italy) Alberto Paloschi	0(1)	0	0	0	0(1)	0	0	0
11	FW	(Italy) Amauri	11	7	0	0	11	7	2	0
13	MF	(Brazil) Ângelo	10(11)	0	0	0	10(11)	0	5	0
14	MF	(Italy) Daniele Galloppa	5(6)	0	1	0	6(6)	0	2	1
16	GK	(Italy) Stefano Russo	0	0	0	0	0	0	0	0
17	MF	(Portugal) Danilo Pereira	0	0	0	0	0	0	0	0
18	MF	(Italy) Massimo Gobbi	30(4)	0	0	0	30(4)	0	4	0
20	MF	(Spain) Toni Calvo	0(3)	0	0	0	0(3)	0	1	0
21	MF	(Italy) Sebastian Giovinco	28(2)	7	1(1)	0	29(3)	7	5	0
22	MF	(Brazil) Zé Eduardo	0(2)	0	0	0	0(2)	0	0	0
23	DF	(Italy) Francesco Modesto	13(2)	1	1	0	14(2)	1	2	0
24	DF	(Italy) Massimo Paci (vice- captain)	18(1)	0	2	0	20(1)	0	7	2
25	FW	(Serbia) Nemanja Čović	0	0	0	0	0	0	0	0
26	DF	(Italy) Marco Pisano	2(3)	0	1	0	3(3)	0	1	0
27	MF	(Italy) Matteo Mandorlini	0	0	0	0	0	0	0	0
27	MF	(Portugal) Filipe Oliveira	0(1)	0	0	0	0(1)	0	0	0
29	DF	(Argentina) Gabriel Paletta	26(1)	0	0(1)	0	26(2)	0	9	1
30	MF	(Italy) Filippo Savi	0	0	0	0	0	0	0	0
32	MF	(Italy) Manuel Coppola	0(1)	0	0	0	0(1)	0	0	0
36	FW	(Italy) Francesco Finocchio	0	0	0	0	0	0	0	0
37	DF	(Italy) Davide Adorni	0	0	0	0	0	0	0	0
38	MF	(Italy) Alessandro De Vitis	0	0	0	0	0	0	0	0
39	DF	(Italy) Markus Petrozzi	0	0	0	0	0	0	0	0
40	MF	(Nigeria) Nwankwo Obiora	0(1)	0	0	0	0(1)	0	0	0
51	DF	(Argentina) Paolo Dellafiore	0(1)	0	1	0	1(1)	0	0	0
58	FW	(France) Grégoire Defrel	0(1)	0	0	0	0(1)	0	0	0
80	MF	(Italy) Francesco Valiani	31(4)	0	1(1)	0	32(5)	0	10	0
83	GK	(Italy) Antonio Mirante	36	0	0	0	36	0	2	0
84	FW	(Italy) Raffaele Palladino	6(5)	3	1	0	7(5)	3	0	0
86	FW	(Bulgaria) Valeri Bojinov	13(18)	3	2	0	15(18)	3	1	0
92	GK	(Dominican Republic) Antonio Santurro	0	0	0	0	0	0	0	0

Joined in January	Left in January

== Transfers ==
Parma's first major moves of the summer transfer window came in quick succession, signing previous season loanee and striker Valeri Bojinov from Manchester City, who revealed he had turned down an approach from Sevilla, and central defender Gabriel Paletta from Boca Juniors in the space of two days. Spaniard Fernando Marqués also arrived for an undisclosed fee from Espanyol. Midfielders Sebastian Giovinco and Massimo Gobbi both signed for Parma at the start of August on a loan deal from Juventus and on a free transfer from Fiorentina respectively, as did Danilo Pereira from Benfica. Journeyman forward Cristiano Lucarelli signed on loan for Napoli after he was told he was surplus to requirements at Parma, while experienced defender Christian Panucci retired at the age of thirty-seven. Parma ended the transfer window by signing Italian World Cup squad member Antonio Candreva on loan from Udinese for the duration of the season.

Business in the winter transfer window started early as full ownership of Italian international left-back Luca Antonelli and Parma's half-share in Alberto Paloschi were both transferred to Genoa. In return Genoa paid €7 million and exchanged the full ownership of Francesco Modesto and Genoa's share in Raffaele Palladino, who remained co-owned by Juventus. Parma also completed the loan signing of Toni Calvo from Greek UEFA Europa League entrants Aris with an option to make the move permanent in the summer. On deadline day, Parma signed Italian international Amauri from rivals Juventus on loan until the end of the season.

On 2 July 2010, the FIGC announced only one new non-EU signing from abroad could be registered, instead of two in previous season. They are marked yellow.

=== In ===
Date	Pos.	Name	From	Type of transfer	Fee
10 June 2010	AM	(Italy) Gabriele Paonessa	(Italy) Bologna	Co-ownership	Undisclosed
25 June 2010	CM	(Switzerland) Blerim Džemaili	(Italy) Torino	Co-ownership	€3,750,000
25 June 2010	GK	(Italy) Antonio Mirante	(Italy) Sampdoria	Full ownership	€3,600,000
25 June 2010	CB	(Argentina) Gabriel Paletta	(Argentina) Boca Juniors	Full ownership	Free
25 June 2010	MF	(Italy) Francesco Lunardini	(Italy) Rimini	Full ownership	Undisclosed
25 June 2010	AM	(Italy) Daniele Galloppa	(Italy) Siena	Co-ownership	€5,000,000
25 June 2010	ST	(Italy) Andrea Rispoli	(Italy) Brescia	Co-ownership	Undisclosed
26 June 2010	DF	(Italy) Luca Tedeschi	(Italy) Treviso	Half to full ownership	Undisclosed
30 June 2010	ST	(Bosnia and Herzegovina) Milan Đurić	(Italy) Cesena	Co-ownership	€300,000
1 July 2010	RB	(Venezuela) Rolf Feltscher	(Switzerland) Grasshopper	Full ownership	Free
4 July 2010	ST	(Bulgaria) Valeri Bojinov	(England) Manchester City	Full ownership	€6,000,000
12 July 2010	RM	(Portugal) Filipe Oliveira	(Portugal) Braga	Full ownership	€2,500,000
14 July 2010	MF	(Spain) Fernando Marqués	(Spain) Espanyol	Full ownership	Undisclosed
27 July 2010	ST	(Italy) Riccardo Capogna	(Italy) Carpenedolo	Full ownership	Free
2 August 2010	DF	(Italy) Marco Pisano	(Italy) Torino	Full ownership	Undisclosed
3 August 2010	RB	(Brazil) Ângelo	Unattached	Full ownership	Free
18 August 2010	MF	(Italy) Massimo Gobbi	Unattached	Full ownership	Free
18 August 2010	MF	(Portugal) Danilo Pereira	(Portugal) Benfica	Full ownership	€150,000
3 January 2011	LB; ST	(Italy) Francesco Modesto (Italy) Raffaele Palladino	(Italy) Genoa	Full ownership Co-ownership	Free €1,500,000

=== Out ===
Date	Pos.	Name	To	Type of Transfer	Fee
10 June 2010	ST	(Italy) Daniele Paponi	(Italy) Bologna	Co-ownership	€500,000
25 June 2010	MF	(Italy) Daniele Dessena	(Italy) Sampdoria	Half to full ownership	Undisclosed
25 June 2010	ST	(Brazil) Reginaldo	(Italy) Siena	Co-ownership	Undisclosed
30 June 2010	RB	(Italy) Damiano Zenoni	Unattached	Full ownership	Free
13 July 2010	ST; CM	(France) Jonathan Biabiany (Kenya) McDonald Mariga	(Italy) Inter	Half to Full ownership	€5,500,000 €4,500,000
30 July 2010	MF	(Honduras) Julio César de León	(China) Shandong Luneng Taishan	Full ownership	Undisclosed
6 August 2010	DF	(Italy) Fabio Lebran	(Italy) AlbinoLeffe	Co-ownership	€150,000
3 January 2011	LB; ST	(Italy) Luca Antonelli (Italy) Alberto Paloschi	(Italy) Genoa	Full ownership Co-ownership	€3,500,000 €4,350,000

=== Loan in ===
Date from	Date to	Pos.	Name	From	Fee
1 July 2010	30 June 2011	DM	(Brazil) Zé Eduardo	(Brazil) Maga	€500,000
5 August 2010	30 June 2011	AM	(Italy) Sebastian Giovinco	(Italy) Juventus	€1,000,000
21 August 2010	1 January 2011	RB	(Argentina) Hernán Paolo Dellafiore	(Italy) Palermo	Free
31 August 2010	30 June 2011	CM	(Italy) Antonio Candreva	(Italy) Udinese	€500,000
1 January 2011	30 June 2011	RM	(Spain) Toni Calvo	(Greece) Aris	Free
January 2011	30 June 2011	CM	(Nigeria) Nwankwo Obiora	(Italy) Inter	Undisclosed
31 January 2011	30 June 2011	ST	(Italy) Amauri	(Italy) Juventus	Free

=== Loan out ===
Date from	Date to	Pos.	Name	To	Fee
30 June 2010	30 June 2011	CB	(Argentina) Pablo Fontanello	(Argentina) Gimnasia	Free
1 July 2010	30 June 2011	CB	(Italy) Riccardo Pasi	(Italy) Modena	Free
1 July 2010	30 June 2011	CB	(Italy) Marco Rossi	(Italy) Bari	€250,000
9 July 2010	30 June 2011	DF	(Italy) Abel Gigli	(Italy) Atletico Roma	Free
22 July 2010	30 June 2011	MF	(Italy) Pietro Baccolo	(Italy) South Tyrol	Free
29 July 2010	31 January 2011	RM	(Portugal) Filipe Oliveira	(Italy) Torino	€600,000
16 August 2010	30 June 2011	LB	(Italy) Paolo Castellini	(Italy) Roma	€950,000
16 August 2010	30 June 2011	MF	(Italy) Francesco Lunardini	(Italy) Triestina	Free
20 August 2010	30 June 2011	CB	(Italy) Luca Tedeschi	(Italy) Crotone	Free
21 August 2010	30 June 2011	ST	(Italy) Cristiano Lucarelli	(Italy) Napoli	Free
30 August 2010	30 June 2011	MF	(Italy) Manuel Coppola	(Italy) Lecce	€400,000
30 August 2010	30 June 2011	CB	(Italy) Andrea Rispoli	(Italy) Lecce	Free
31 August 2010	27 January 2011	FW	(Bosnia and Herzegovina) Milan Đurić	(Italy) Ascoli	Free
31 August 2010	30 June 2011	MF	(Italy) Matteo Mandorlini	(Italy) Piacenza	Free
31 August 2010	30 June 2011	MF	(Italy) Alessio Manzoni	(Italy) AlbinoLeffe	Free
31 August 2010	30 June 2011	FW	(Italy) Gabriele Paonessa	(Italy) Cesena	Free
20 January 2011	30 June 2011	MF	(Portugal) Danilo Pereira	(Greece) Aris	Free
28 January 2011	30 June 2011	FW	(Bosnia and Herzegovina) Milan Đurić	(Italy) Crotone	Free
31 January 2011	30 June 2011	MF	(Italy) Filippo Savi	(Italy) Crociati Noceto	Free

== See also ==
- List of Parma F.C. seasons
