= List of Parma Calcio 1913 seasons =

This is a list of seasons played by Parma Calcio 1913, an Italian professional football club currently playing in Serie A based in Parma, Emilia-Romagna. It details Parma's achievements in major competitions, together with the top scorers for each season of their existence up to the most recent completed season. Top scorers in bold were also the top scorers in the league that season. Parma have never won a top flight league title, but have won three Italian Cups, one Supercoppa Italiana, as well as two UEFA Cups, one European Super Cup and one UEFA Cup Winners' Cup. The club won all eight of these trophies between 1992 and 2002, a period in which it is also achieved its best ever league finish as runners-up in the 1996–97 season.

As of 2025, although Parma have spent just 28 seasons in Serie A, they have amassed the fifteenth-most points in the league's history and have the fifteenth-best average points total per season in the division (assuming 3 points for a win throughout its history), whose inception was in 1929. Since 1929, Parma have spent 28 seasons in the top flight of Italian football, 31 at the second level, 32 at the third and 5 at the fourth.

== History ==
The club was founded as Parma Foot Ball Club in December 1913. At this time Parma's matches were less well-organised and arranged on a largely ad-hoc basis. Official records from these matches are sketchy at best. The club began playing league football in 1919 and became founder members of Serie B in 1928. The club would then be renamed Associazione Sportiva Parma in 1932. Much of the next few decades was spent in the doldrums; a time which included the absorption of A.C. Parmense and another rename to Associazone Club Parma in 1968 due to financial difficulties.

Easily Parma's most successful period followed promotion to Serie A in 1990 under Nevio Scala. Scala remained at the club until 1996 and won the Crociati's first ever major trophies – securing one Coppa Italia, one UEFA Cup Winners' Cup, one UEFA Cup and one Supercoppa Italiana win. Four more triumphs – two in the Coppa Italia, one in the UEFA Cup and another in the Supercoppa Italiana – followed before 2002. The club became embroiled in financial disaster after the fraud of the Parmalat and A.C. Parma owners came to a head soon after and no major trophies have been won since. The club was re-founded as Parma Football Club in 2004 and a sale to current owner Tommaso Ghirardi in early 2007.

== Key ==
- Pld = Matches played
- W = Matches won
- D = Matches drawn
- L = Matches lost
- GF = Goals for
- GA = Goals against
- Pts = Points
- Pos = Final position
- DNQ = Did not qualify
- Grp = Group stage
- QR1 = First qualifying round
- QR2 = Second qualifying round
- QR3 = Third qualifying round
- PO = Play-off round
- 1R = First round
- 2R = Second round
- 3R = Third round
- R32 = Round of 32
- R16 = Round of 16
- QF = Quarter-finals
- SF = Semi-finals
- RU = Runners-up
- W = Winners

Champions	Runners-up

== Seasons ==
Season	League (Note: Before the establishment of the modern Serie A in 1929, the championship was contested under several different formats, including knock-out competitions or successive group stages.) (Note: The number in superscript represents the number of parallel divisions there were to the one in which Parma were competing, where there were two or more (including the division in which Parma competed).)										Cup (Note: The Coppa Italia was founded in 1922, but - despite an abortive attempt in 1927 - a second edition did not take place before the 1935–36 season. Since then the tournament was played on a regular basis until 1943, when it was suspended due to WWII. The competition was eventually resumed only in 1958.)	Europe / Other		Top league goalscorer(s)	
Season	Level	Division	Pld	W	D	L	GF	GA	Pts	Pos	Cup	Europe / Other		Players(s)	Goals
1919–20	2	Promozione/Emilia^{13}	8	5	1	2	27	13	11	2nd ↑ (Note: Parma lost a two-legged tie-breaker 4–1 to Mantova, so failed to qualify for the northern finals.)	Was not held	—			
1920–21	1	Prima Categoria/Emilia/A^{17}	8	5	1	2	27	13	11	2nd	Was not held	—			
1920–21	1	Prima Categoria/Emilia/Final^{8}	2	1	0	1	0	5	1	2nd	Was not held	—			
1921–22	1	Prima Categoria/Emilia/A^{10}	4	2	1	1	6	4	5	2nd	1R	—			
1921–22	1	Prima Categoria/Emilia/Final^{6}	6	1	2	3	8	13	4	3rd	1R	—			
1922–23	2	Seconda Divisione/D^{6}	14	7	2	5	33	17	16	3rd	Was not held	—			
1923–24	2	Seconda Divisione/F^{6}	14	8	4	2	30	13	20	2nd	Was not held	—			
1924–25	2	Seconda Divisione/Nord/C^{9}	16	12	1	3	45	16	25	1st	Was not held	—			
1924–25	2	Seconda Divisione/Nord/Final^{2}	6	3	1	2	9	10	7	**1st** ↑	Was not held	—			
1925–26	1	Prima Divisione/B^{2}	22	5	2	15	23	58	16	11th ↓	Was not held	—		(Italy) Mattioli	10
1926–27	2	Prima Divisione/C^{4}	18	8	4	6	27	25	20	4th	3R	—			
1927–28	2	Prima Divisione/B^{4}	18						21	4th	Was not held	—			
1928–29	2	Prima Divisione/B^{3}	26	15	6	5	57	31	36	1st	Was not held	—			
1928–29	2	Prima Divisione/Final	2	0	1	1	1	2	1	2nd	Was not held	—			
1929–30	2	Serie B	34	12	8	14	38	57	32	12th	Was not held	—			
1930–31	2	Serie B	34	10	7	17	45	64	27	13th	Was not held	—			
1931–32	2	Serie B	34	3	3	28	25	98	9	18th ↓	Was not held	—			
1932–33	3	Prima Divisione/E^{9}	24	13	4	7	41	33	30	2nd	Was not held	—			
1933–34	3	Prima Divisione/B^{8}	26	17	4	5	61	22	38	1st	Was not held	—			
1933–34	3	Prima Divisione/Final B^{4}	6	2	0	4	7	11	4	4th	Was not held	—			
1934–35	3	Prima Divisione/B^{8}	26	15	7	4	58	18	37	2nd	Was not held	—		(Italy) Giuseppe Cella	15
1935–36	3	Serie C/B^{4}	30	12	6	12	39	39	30	9th	3R	—			
1936–37	3	Serie C/B^{5}	30	9	11	10	39	40	29	10th	3R	—			
1937–38	3	Serie C/B^{5}	30	4	9	17	25	57	17	15th	1R	—			
1938–39	3	Serie C/B^{8}	26	12	6	8	34	26	30	5th	1R	—			
1939–40	3	Serie C/B^{8}	30	14	8	8	42	33	36	4th	2R	—		(Italy) Alessandro Fornasaris	20
1940–41	3	Serie C/B^{8}	30	15	5	10	56	46	35	5th	3R	—			
1941–42	3	Serie C/B^{8}	30	20	7	3	89	37	47	2nd	DNQ	—		(Italy) Luciano Degara	30
1942–43	3	Serie C/G^{12}	19	17	1	1	82	11	35	1st	DNQ	—		(Italy) Luciano Degara	31
1942–43	3	Serie C/Final B^{2}	10	6	1	3	23	10	13	DQ - 6th	DNQ	—		(Italy) Luciano Degara	31
1943–44	Leagues suspended for World War II										Was not held	Campionato Alto Italia	Grp	(Italy) Enzo Loni	11
1944–45	Leagues suspended for World War II										Was not held	—			
1945–46	2	Serie B-C/C^{3}	22	12	4	6	36	20	28	3rd	Was not held	—			
1946–47	2	Serie B/B^{3}	40	14	10	16	41	45	38	14th	Was not held	—			
1947–48	2	Serie B/B^{3}	34	12	14	8	33	28	38	7th (Note: Parma avoided relegation after finishing second three-way relegation tie-breaker with Cremonese and Prato.)	Was not held	—			
1948–49	2	Serie B	42	12	13	17	42	59	37	19th ↓ (Note: Parma lost a relegation tie-breaker 4–1 to Spezia to consign themselves to relegation.)	Was not held	—			
1949–50	3	Serie C/B^{4}	40	21	9	10	64	28	52	2nd	Was not held	—			
1950–51	3	Serie C/B^{4}	38	21	7	10	57	32	49	3rd	Was not held	—		(Italy) William Bronzoni	20
1951–52	3	Serie C/B^{4}	34	21	10	3	75	24	52	2nd	Was not held	—		(Italy) Edmundo Fabbri	20
1952–53	3	Serie C	34	14	8	12	47	31	36	6th	Was not held	—		(Czech Republic) Július Korostelev	15
1953–54	3	Serie C	34	17	9	8	45	23	43	**1st** ↑	Was not held	—		(Czech Republic) Július Korostelev	15
1954–55	2	Serie B	34	8	17	9	37	40	33	9th	Was not held	—		(Italy) Aldo Fontana (Czech Republic) Čestmír Vycpálek	8
1955–56	2	Serie B	34	10	8	16	36	46	28	15th	Was not held	—		(Italy) Paolo Erba	14
1956–57	2	Serie B	34	9	13	12	33	38	31	12th	Was not held	—		(Italy) **Paolo Erba**	16
1957–58	2	Serie B	34	5	14	15	25	49	24	18th	DNQ	—		(Italy) Carlo Dell'Omodarme	6
1958–59	2	Serie B	38	10	12	16	41	64	32	18th	2R	—		(Italy) Franco Marmiroli	13
1959–60	2	Serie B	38	9	16	13	38	50	34	14th	R32	—		(Italy) Giuseppe Calzolari (Italy) Giampaolo Menichelli	8
1960–61	2	Serie B	38	12	11	15	36	36	35	13th	R32	Coppa delle Alpi (Note: Teams from Italy – Parma, Brescia, Lecco, Pro Patria, Reggiana, Monza, Lazio and Fiorentina – took on teams from Switzerland – Lugano, Luzern, YF Zurigo, Schaffhausen, Biel-Bienne, Bellinzona, Grasshopper, Young Boys – and the Italians emerged victorious.)	**W**	(Italy) Giuseppe Calzolari	13
1961–62	2	Serie B	38	9	17	12	25	33	35	12th	1R	—		(Italy) Giovanni Meregalli	6
1962–63	2	Serie B	38	12	11	15	32	44	35	13th	1R	—		(Italy) Giovanni Meregalli	6
1963–64	2	Serie B	38	8	16	14	31	43	32	15th	R16	—		(Italy) Dario Cavallito (Italy) Dimitri Pinti	8
1964–65	2	Serie B	38	7	9	22	23	54	23	20th ↓	R16	—		(Italy) Giovanni Meregalli (Italy) Dimitri Pinti	3
1965–66	3	Serie C/A^{3}	34	3	19	12	15	28	25	17th ↓	DNQ	—		(Italy) Armando Onesti	5
1966–67	4	Serie D/C^{6}	34	14	11	9	39	29	39	6th	DNQ	—		(Italy) Giuseppe Mattei	8
1967–68	4	Serie D/B^{9}	34	10	14	10	28	23	34	6th	DNQ	—			
1968–69	4	Serie D/B^{9}	34	8	13	13	21	31	29	14th	DNQ	—		(Italy) William Rizzi	6
1969–70	4	Serie D/B^{9}	34	23	6	5	40	15	52	**1st** ↑	DNQ	—		(Italy) Carlo Rancati	14
1970–71	3	Serie C/A^{3}	38	14	13	11	50	39	41	5th	DNQ	—		(Italy) Orazio Rancati	18
1971–72	3	Serie C/B^{3}	38	17	16	5	48	26	40	2nd	DNQ	—		(Italy) Fabio Bonci	20
1972–73	3	Serie C/A^{3}	38	19	14	5	40	15	52	**1st** ↑	DNQ	Coppa Italia Semiprofessionisti	QF	(Italy) Alberto Rizzati	13
1973–74	2	Serie B	38	10	19	9	39	32	39	5th	Grp	—		(Italy) Alberto Rizzati	15
1974–75	2	Serie B	38	9	15	14	30	37	30	20th ↓	Grp	—		(Italy) **Fabio Bonci**	14
1975–76	3	Serie C/B^{3}	38	16	14	8	42	25	46	2nd	DNQ	Coppa Italia Semiprofessionisti		(Italy) Alberto Rizzati	10
1976–77	3	Serie C/B^{3}	38	16	14	8	46	33	46	2nd	DNQ	Coppa Italia Semiprofessionisti	R16		
1976–77	3	Serie C/B^{3}	38	16	14	8	46	33	46	2nd	DNQ	Anglo-Italian Cup	Grp		
1977–78	3	Serie C/B^{3}	38	16	14	8	50	37	46	4th	DNQ	Coppa Italia Semiprofessionisti	R32		
1978–79	3	Serie C1/A^{2}	34	16	12	6	43	16	48	2nd ↑	DNQ	Coppa Italia Semiprofessionisti	Grp		
1979–80	2	Serie B	38	7	13	18	27	49	27	19th ↓	Grp	—			
1980–81	3	Serie C1/A^{2}	34	8	14	12	25	32	30	13th	DNQ	Coppa Italia Semiprofessionisti		(Italy) Sergio D'Agostino	9
1981–82	3	Serie C1/A^{2}	34	9	13	12	30	32	31	9th	DNQ	Coppa Italia Serie C	R16	(Italy) Enrico Cannata	10
1982–83	3	Serie C1/A^{2}	34	10	14	10	28	26	34	6th	DNQ	Coppa Italia Serie C	R32	(Italy) Massimo Barbuti	10
1983–84	3	Serie C1/A^{2}	34	18	12	4	47	20	48	**1st** ↑	Grp	Coppa Italia Serie C	R32	(Italy) Massimo Barbuti	17
1984–85	2	Serie B	38	6	14	18	25	47	26	18th ↓	QF	—		(Italy) Massimo Barbuti	10
1985–86	3	Serie C1/A^{2}	34	16	15	3	39	14	47	**1st** ↑	Grp	Coppa Italia Serie C	R32	(Italy) Marco Rossi	10
1986–87	2	Serie B	38	11	18	9	30	26	40	7th	QF	—		(Italy) Mario Bortolazzi	7
1987–88	2	Serie B	38	9	20	9	33	33	38	11th	R16	—		(Italy) Marco Osio (Italy) Davide Zannoni	7
1988–89	2	Serie B	38	8	21	9	29	31	37	9th	Grp	—		(Italy) Lorenzo Minotti	7
1989–90	2	Serie B	38	16	14	8	49	30	46	4th ↑	1R	—		(Italy) Fausto Pizzi	12
1990–91	1	Serie A	34	13	12	9	35	31	38	6th	2R	—		(Italy) Alessandro Melli	13
1991–92	1	Serie A	34	11	16	7	32	28	38	6th	**W**	UEFA Cup	1R	(Italy) Alessandro Melli	6
1992–93	1	Serie A	34	16	9	9	47	34	41	3rd	QF	Cup Winners' Cup	**W**	(Italy) Alessandro Melli	12
1992–93	1	Serie A	34	16	9	9	47	34	41	3rd	QF	Supercoppa Italiana	RU	(Italy) Alessandro Melli	12
1993–94	1	Serie A	34	17	7	10	50	35	41	5th	SF	Cup Winners' Cup	RU	(Italy) Gianfranco Zola	18
1993–94	1	Serie A	34	17	7	10	50	35	41	5th	SF	Super Cup	**W**	(Italy) Gianfranco Zola	18
1994–95	1	Serie A	34	18	9	7	51	31	63 (Note: The 1994–95 season saw the introduction of three points for a win.)	3rd	RU	UEFA Cup	**W**	(Italy) Gianfranco Zola	19
1995–96	1	Serie A	34	16	10	8	44	31	58	5th	2R	Cup Winners' Cup	QF	(Italy) Gianfranco Zola	10
1995–96	1	Serie A	34	16	10	8	44	31	58	5th	2R	Supercoppa Italiana	RU	(Italy) Gianfranco Zola	10
1996–97	1	Serie A	34	18	9	7	41	26	63	2nd	2R	UEFA Cup	R32	(Italy) Enrico Chiesa	14
1997–98	1	Serie A	34	15	12	7	55	39	57	5th	SF	Champions League	Grp	(Argentina) Hernán Crespo	12
1998–99	1	Serie A	34	15	10	9	55	36	55	4th	**W**	UEFA Cup	**W**	(Argentina) Hernán Crespo	16
1999–2000	1	Serie A	34	16	10	8	52	37	58	5th (Note: Parma lost a UEFA Champions League qualification tie-breaker 3–1 to Internazionale to consign themselves to a place in the UEFA Cup.)	R16	Champions League	QR3	(Argentina) Hernán Crespo	22
1999–2000	1	Serie A	34	16	10	8	52	37	58	5th	R16	UEFA Cup	R16	(Argentina) Hernán Crespo	22
1999–2000	1	Serie A	34	16	10	8	52	37	58	5th	R16	Supercoppa Italiana	**W**	(Argentina) Hernán Crespo	22
2000–01	1	Serie A	34	16	8	10	51	31	56	4th	RU	UEFA Cup	R16	(Italy) Marco Di Vaio	15
2001–02	1	Serie A	34	12	8	14	43	47	44	10th	**W**	Champions League	QR3	(Italy) Marco Di Vaio	20
2001–02	1	Serie A	34	12	8	14	43	47	44	10th	**W**	UEFA Cup	R16	(Italy) Marco Di Vaio	20
2002–03	1	Serie A	34	15	11	8	55	36	56	5th	2R	UEFA Cup	2R	(Romania) Adrian Mutu	16
2002–03	1	Serie A	34	15	11	8	55	36	56	5th	2R	Supercoppa Italiana	RU	(Romania) Adrian Mutu	16
2003–04	1	Serie A	34	16	10	8	57	46	58	5th	QF	UEFA Cup	R32	(Italy) Alberto Gilardino	23
2004–05	1	Serie A	38	10	12	16	48	65	42	17th (Note: Parma won a relegation tie-breaker 2–1 against Bologna over two legs to avoid relegation.)	R16	UEFA Cup	SF	(Italy) Alberto Gilardino	23
2005–06	1	Serie A	38	12	9	17	46	60	45	7th	R16	—		(Italy) Bernardo Corradi (Brazil) Fábio Simplício	10
2006–07	1	Serie A	38	10	12	16	41	56	42	12th	QF	UEFA Cup	R32	(Croatia) Igor Budan	13
2007–08	1	Serie A	38	7	13	18	42	62	34	19th ↓	R32	—		(Croatia) Igor Budan	7
2008–09	2	Serie B	42	19	19	4	65	34	76	2nd ↑	R32	—		(Italy) Cristiano Lucarelli (Italy) Alberto Paloschi	12
2009–10	1	Serie A	38	14	10	14	46	51	52	8th	R32	—		(Bulgaria) Valeri Bojinov	8
2010–11	1	Serie A	38	11	13	14	39	47	46	12th	QF	—		(Argentina) Hernán Crespo	9
2011–12	1	Serie A	38	15	11	12	54	53	56	8th	R32	—		(Italy) Sebastian Giovinco	15
2012–13	1	Serie A	38	13	10	15	45	46	49	10th	R16	—		(Italy) Amauri	10
2013–14	1	Serie A	38	15	13	10	58	46	58	6th	R16	—		(Italy) Antonio Cassano	12
2014–15	1	Serie A	38	6	8	24	33	75	19 (Note: Parma was docked 7 points for failing to pay players' wages.)	20th ↓	QF	—		(Italy) Antonio Cassano	5
2015–16	4	Serie D/D^{9}	38	28	10	0	82	17	94	**1st** ↑	DNQ	Coppa Serie D	1R	(Senegal) Yves Baraye	20
2015–16	4	Serie D/Finale B^{3}	2	0	1	1	3	4	1	3rd	DNQ	Coppa Serie D	1R	(Senegal) Yves Baraye	20
2016–17	3	Lega Pro/B^{3}	38	20	10	8	55	36	70	2nd ↑ (Note: Parma won the promotion play-offs, winning the final 2–0 against Alessandria to secure promotion.)	DNQ	Coppa Lega Pro	1R	(Italy) Emanuele Calaiò	15
2017–18	2	Serie B	42	21	9	12	57	37	85	2nd ↑	2R	—		(Italy) Emanuele Calaiò	13
2018–19	1	Serie A	38	10	11	17	41	61	41	14th	3R	—		(Ivory Coast) Gervinho	11
2019–20	1	Serie A	38	14	7	17	56	57	49	11th	R16	—		(Denmark) Andreas Cornelius	12
2020–21	1	Serie A	38	3	11	24	39	83	20	20th ↓	R16	—		(Slovakia) Juraj Kucka	7
2021–22	2	Serie B	38	11	16	11	48	43	49	12th	1R	—		(Argentina) Franco Vázquez	14
2022–23	2	Serie B	38	17	10	11	48	39	60	4th (Note: Parma lost the promotion play-offs, losing the semi-finals 2–3 against Cagliari on aggregate to consign themselves to Serie B.)	R16	—		(Argentina) Franco Vázquez	11
2023–24	2	Serie B	38	21	13	4	66	35	76	**1st** ↑	R16	—		(Romania) Dennis Man	11
2024–25	1	Serie A	38	7	15	16	44	58	36	16	1R	—		(France) Ange-Yoan Bonny	6
