= Stadio Ennio Tardini =

Sports stadium in Parma, Italy

- Il Tardini
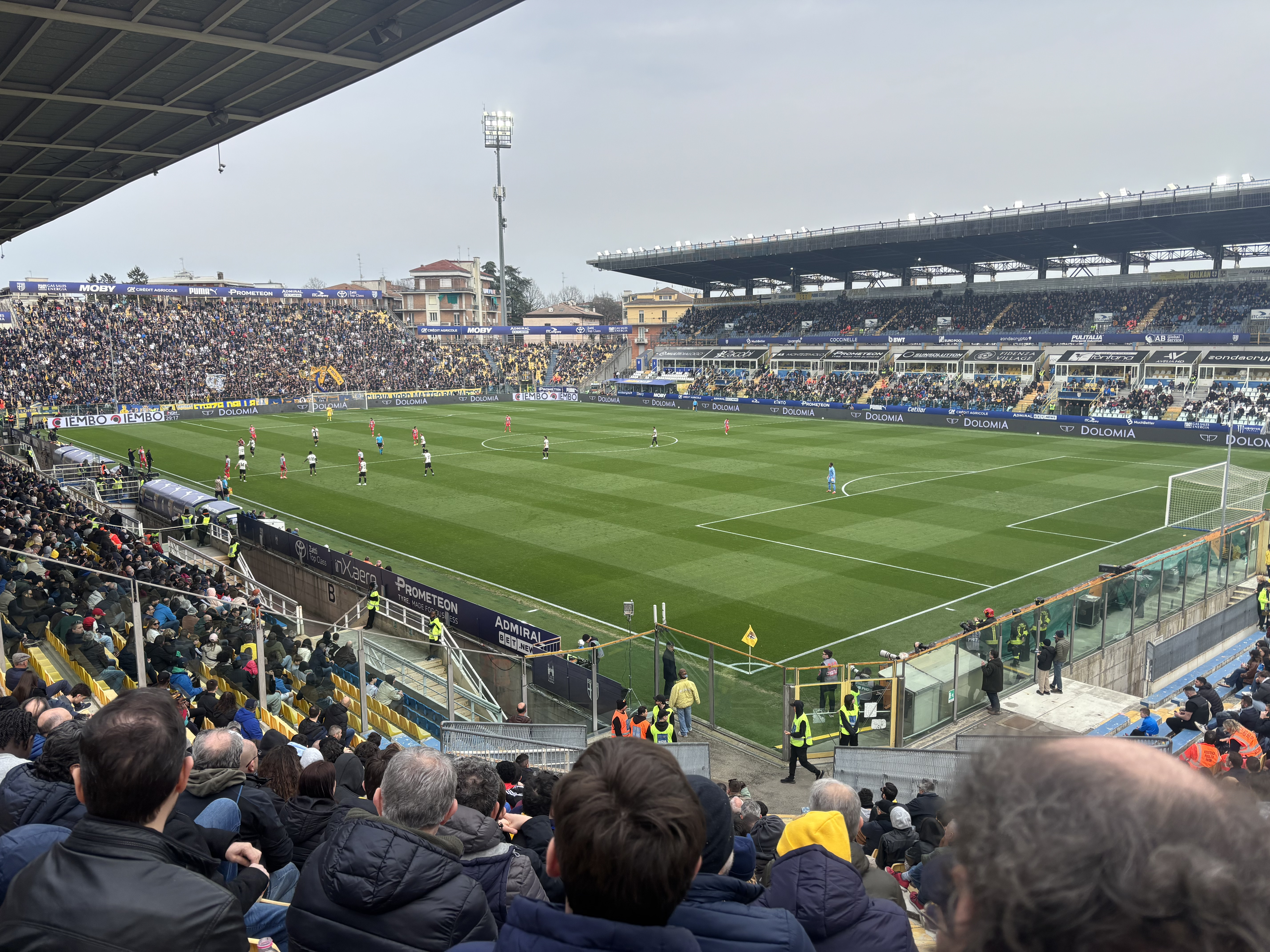
- Interactive map of Stadio Ennio Tardini
- Former names: Stadio Municipale (1922–1923)
- Location: Viale Partigiani d'Italia, 1; 43123 Parma, Italy
- Coordinates: 44°47′42″N 10°20′18″E
- Owner: Municipality of Parma
- Capacity: 27,906 (often just 22,352 allowed)
- Surface: Grass
- Field size: 105 m × 68 m (344 ft × 223 ft)

Construction
- Groundbreaking: 26 December 1922
- Opened: 16 September 1923
- Renovated: 1990–1993
- Cost: ₤477,000
- Architect: Ettore Leoni

Tenants
- Parma Calcio 1913 (1923–present); Italy national football team (selected matches)

Stadio Ennio Tardini, commonly referred to as just Il Tardini, is a football stadium in Parma, Italy, located near the centre of Parma, between the town centre and the city walls. It is the home of Parma Calcio 1913. The stadium was built in 1923 and was named after one of Parma's former presidents, Ennio Tardini. The stadium is the nineteenth largest football stadium in Italy and the second largest in Emilia–Romagna with a capacity of 22,352 spectators. The stadium is the sixth oldest Italian football ground still in use.

The ground underwent significant expansion under Parmalat's ownership of the resident football club in the 1990s, as the ground's seating capacity was increased from around 13,500 to 29,050. In 2006, the capacity was reduced to 27,906 although only 21,473 are authorised to enter for all-seater events and even those seats are very seldom all sold. The expansion has allowed meant a number of Italy matches have been played at the Tardini. Expansion plans were made public in Italy's unsuccessful bid for Euro 2016 and would have made the permanent capacity of the stadium 31,397.

== History ==
=== Early years (1922–1990) ===
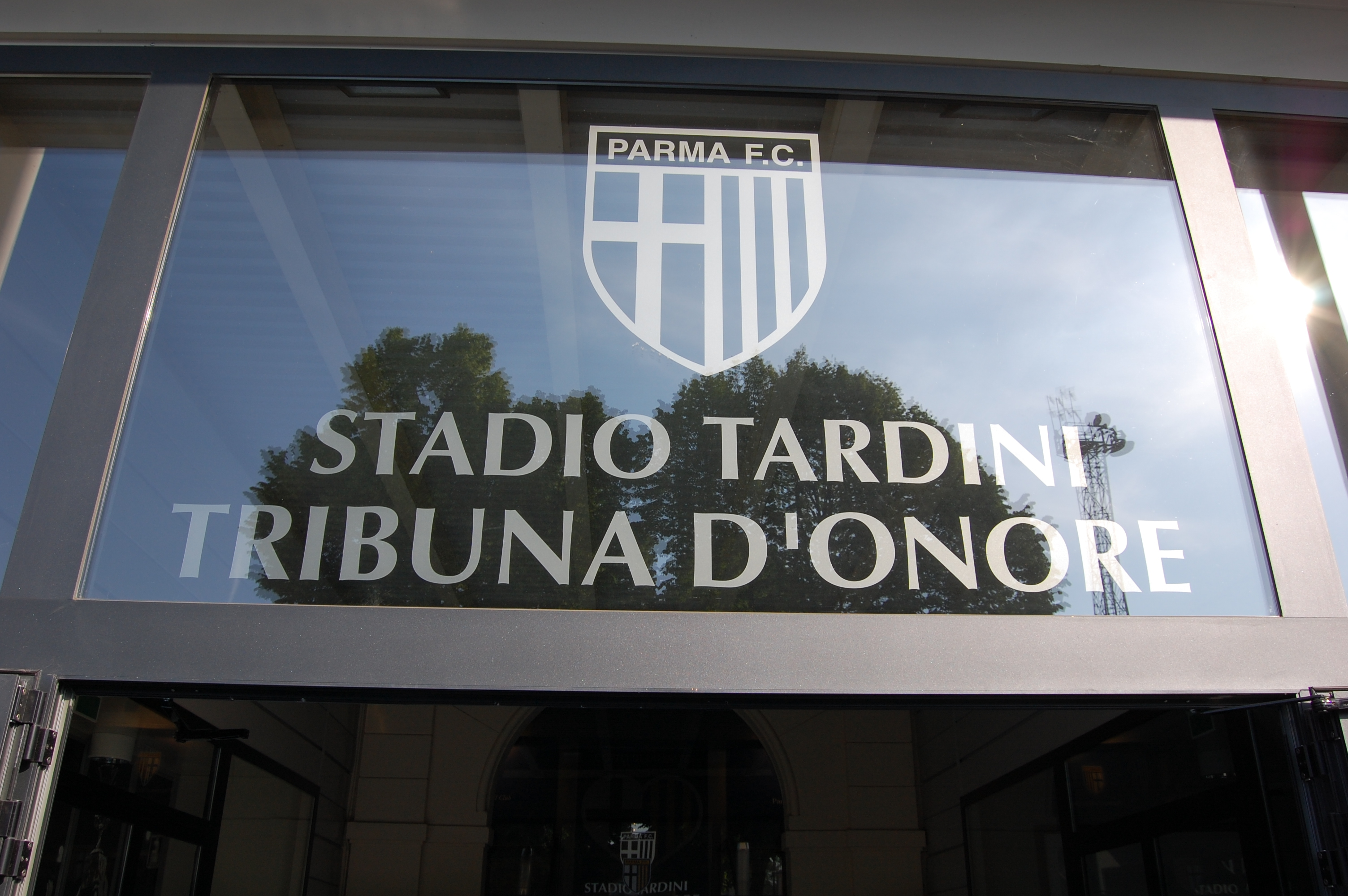
Entrance to the Tribuna d'Onore.

The Tardini was the idea of Ennio Tardini, who was a graduate in Law and club president from 1921 to 1923, but although much of his work was political his passion was sport. In January 1922, the authorities in Parma granted Parma F.B.C. a sum of ₤10,000 and Tardini instigated a national competition for the design of the new stadium in February 1922. To raise further funds, Tardini sold a plot of land for £163,000 to the municipal administration. The club had previously had no fixed home. In September 1922, Parma's committee admitted two projects for consideration: one by Atanasio Soldati and one by Riccardo Bartolomasi, both architects working in Parma. Soldati's plans looked to architectural simplicity with classical Greek features, while Bartolomasi opted for a more convenient and modern approach.

Neither candidate had their work realised. It was architect Ettore Leoni who submitted the final draft for the new stadium, drawing influence from French and German stadia – Lyon's Stade de Gerland in particular – while celebrating the history of Parma. On 26 December 1922, ground was broken on the construction of the stadium and the first stone was laid. The municipal contribution was then raised to £100,000 because of the public nature of the project. Tardini died shortly after, on 16 August 1923, but the stadium – originally to be called Stadio Municipale – would be named in his honour. During the 1970s, the capacity of the stadium stood at approximately 20,000. The stadium originally featured a cycle track that was converted into a clay athletics track in 1935, which was in turn built over at the end of the 1980s. A modern floodlight system was also installed by Azienda Elettrica Comunale in 1954. The Tribuna Petitot – the main grandstand – was completely restructured by the municipal authorities between 1985 and 1990 with reinforced concrete, but the club was beginning to outgrow its stadium and external expansion had become impractical as residential buildings occupied the surrounding area.

=== Reconstruction of north, south and main stands (1990–1993) ===
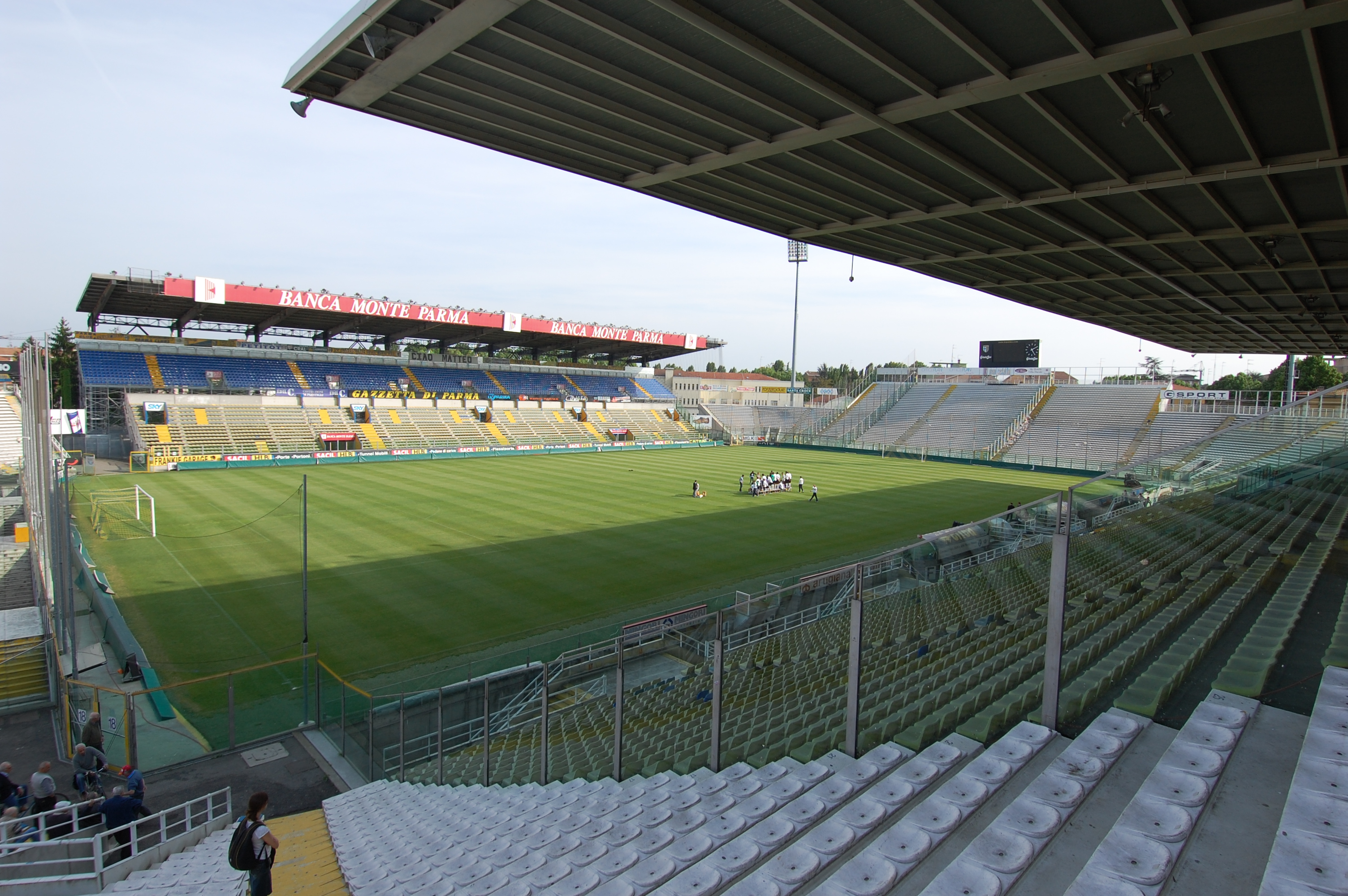
A view of the Tribuna Est and Curva Sud from the north-west quadrant.

Promotion to Serie A in 1990 required a legal minimum of 30,000 seats for any clubs playing in that division. The seating capacity of the stadium at that time was just 13,500. Both viable options were considered: the adaptation of the current stadium and the construction of a new ground in another part of the city. A consortium filed plans for a new stadium to be built near Baganzola, a few miles outside Parma, on 14 June 1990. The idea was praised by the city's authorities, but political change in the city's halls led to delays in the approval of the plans. Consequently, on 29 May 1991 the club voted by a slim majority to renovate the current stadium. First, the grandstand was enlarged. Next, the construction of "English" corner stands – stands which fill in the corners of the stadium and make a rectangular base with all four stands close to the pitch, thereby replacing the oval shape of the stands which had facilitated a running track in previous years – was begun. The Curva Nord, where the club's most dedicated fans sit, was re-developed in this style after Parma's triumph in the Coppa Italia in 1992 before the opposite stand was completed a year later.

Renovations were finally completed in 1993, having begun in 1991, but further plans to improve the stadium were approved by the city on 23 December 1993 with local funding in excess of £12 billion. This time the Tribuna Est was the target. The outcome of the overhaul of the stadium – designed by architects Stefano Della Santa, Italo Jemmi, Paolo Simonetti and Fabrizio Fabbri – begun in the spring of 1991 led to a number of issues relating to inflows and outflows of thousands of people. Other problems included the urban location of the stadium and the consequent necessary construction of the stadium within a defined perimeter. This caused difficulties in the provision of a good view from all seats and of adequate safety features. While the most striking differences to the stadium were the increase in capacity and the removal of the running track, amenities were also vastly improved.

=== Incremental changes (1993–2009) ===
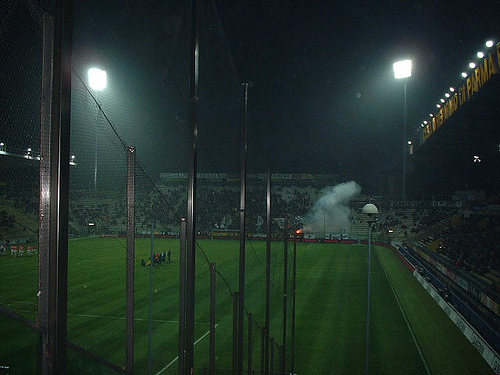
Parma fans let off a flare before their 2001–02 UEFA Cup domestic encounter with Utrecht

In 1997, the stadium was authorised to hold around 28,000 spectators, although there were in fact around 29,200 physical seats. In late August 1997, following the installation of yellow seats, the official capacity of the Stadio Tardini was increased to around 29,000 seats. Again in 1997, next to the Tribuna Petitot further work was completed and underneath the stand, Emporium the club's own megastore was opened, selling branded products. 2000 saw the ticket office re-located to the entrance monuments, and a change to the layout of the forum with the creation of a separate restaurant and dining room under the stands. In 2002, an agreement between the Comune di Parma and Parma A.C. meant the club had a lease of the stadium for thirty years. The agreement is in place to allow the club to continue to renovate the stadium with the goal of optimising in-stadium services for fans and maximising matchday attendance and revenue, but many of the goals envisioned were unattainable due to the financial crisis of Parmalat who were part of the same corporate group as Parma A.C..

Despite the financial misery, the club – now re-formed under the name of Parma F.C. in 2004 – sought to continue to work to its goals and the summer of 2006 saw the upper part of the Tribuna Est removed in preparation for a new grandstand. The tragic death of Parma fan Matteo Bagnaresi led supporters to change the name of the Curva Nord to the Curva Nord Matteo Bagnaresi in his honour. On 31 March 2008, Bagnaresi, a member of Boys Parma 1977, a group of over 100 Parma ultras, was run over on the way to Turin's Stadio Olimpico by a coach which was carrying the opposition Juventus fans, although the extent of intent is not known. In 2006, the maximum capacity of the stadium was reduced from 29,050 to 27,906, although attendance was capped at 15,645 with the closure of the Curva Nord, the lower part of the Tribuna Est and the reduction in capacity of the main stand by the club for its one-season stay in Serie B due to structural problems.

=== Fatality, investment and Euro 2016 bid (2009–present) ===
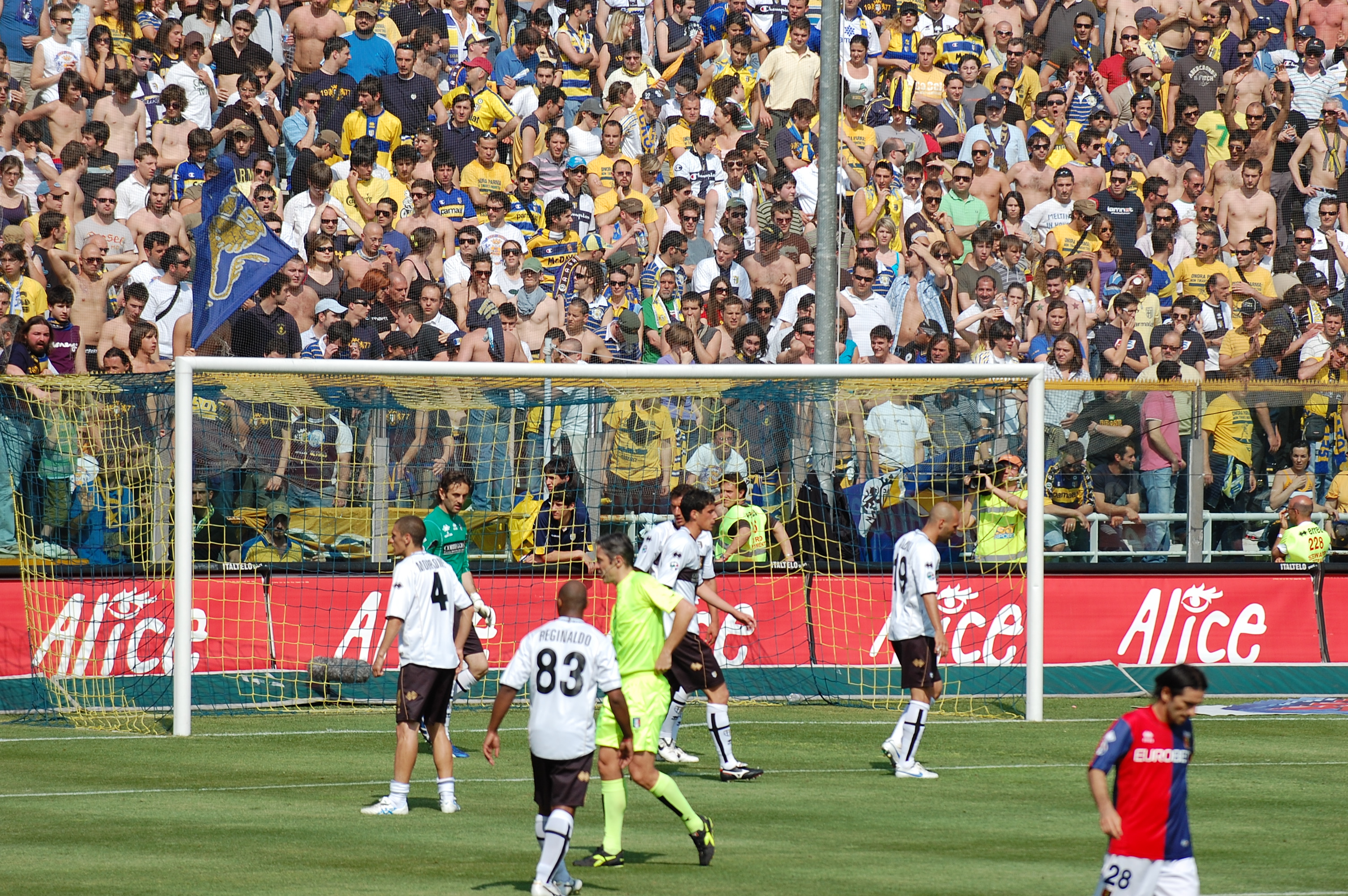
The Curva Nord during Parma's match against Genoa on 4 May 2008.

In May 2009, Vicenza-supporting away fan Eugenio Bortolon was fatally injured in the Curva Sud on the last day of the season, despite the stadium being in full compliance with all safety regulations. The club was cleared of any wrongdoing in 2012. Shortly after, the stadium's remaining capacity was partially restored so that it could hold just over 20,000. Partly as a result of the partial re-opening of sections the stadium, the club has spent €3.5m on improvements to the ground since Tommaso Ghirardi's arrival as club president in 2007. This includes the summer of 2010 spend of €830,000 on the renovation. The Tribuna Est was re-roofed, access was improved with the installation of readers for Parma card holders, a giant screen was installed, improvements were made to drainage, media boxes in the Tribuna Centrale Petitot were built and investment in a new hospitality facilities were made.

The stadium was part of Italy's unsuccessful bid for the right to host Euro 2016 and plans to increase the capacity to 31,397 (30,225 for the tournament) and roof the corners and ends of the stadium were submitted as part of the bid. It would have hosted matches in the group stage and a round of 16 match and the cost of the renovation would have been €40 million had Italy been selected to host the tournament and Parma been chosen as one of the nine host cities, whittled down from the twelve nominated. UEFA praised Parma's ground transport links as "above the benchmark", despite this being perceived as a weakness of the stadium by the club owners, but airport links were criticised as the only airport-stadium link was to be by bus, although the assessment of Parma Airport itself was "slightly above the benchmark".

== Structure and facilities ==
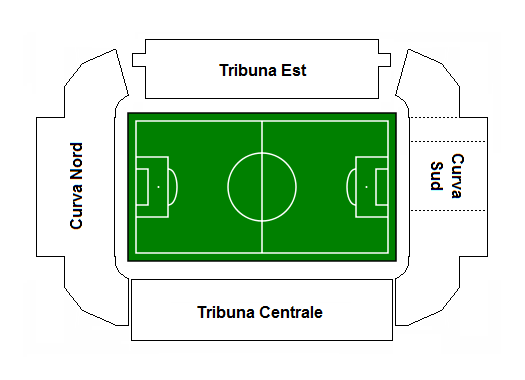
A plan of the layout of the Tardini

Completed in 1990, the Tribuna Petitot is the largest stand and it has three levels internally. The dressing room is housed on the ground floor; the first floor is home to the club's administrative offices, as well as newsrooms, reception rooms and the honours room; and the second floor is used for surveillance and security services control and to house the media. It holds around 8,000 seats, including 348 corporate seats and 148 in the press gallery. The stadium also houses the Emporium, where fans can buy official club merchandise. The club's biggest fans tend to sit in the Curva Nord and the opposition's in the Curva Sud, which were both built in the early 1990s. The area formerly used for away fans alongside the Settore Ospiti, the Curva Sud Ospiti, was closed after a fatal fall by a Vicenza fan during a match in 2009, so the home section of the Curva Sud currently houses away fans only from the summer of 2011. The Tribuna Est, whose capacity was reduced in 2006 in anticipation of its expansion, includes the disabled fan area.

Here is a breakdown of the capacities of each of the four stands of the stadium:

Stand	Seats	Authorised
Tribuna Centrale Petitot	7,912	7,178
Tribuna Est	5,281	2,795
Curva Nord	7,445	6,500
Curva Sud	7,268	5,000
Total	27,906	21,473

160 seats in the Tribuna Est are reserved for disabled supporters and 2,500 of the seats in the Curva Sud are reserved for opposition fans.

== Future ==
In early 2012, then-club president Tommaso Ghirardi noted that the club's two postponed home matches in that period would have gone ahead if all the stands were under cover and that the covering of the curve should become reality. The club could also choose to move to a new stadium, although this would go against Ghirardi's public pronouncements. Rather, he preferred to talk of his dream of renovating the stadium, while managing director Pietro Leonardi has spoken of potential to buy the stadium from the relevant municipal authorities. In November 2012, Leonardi said he wanted "to put an end to the situation where our people, in 2012, have to follow the match in the rain" by adding a roof to uncovered parts of the stadium (i.e. the Curva Sud and the Curva Nord). There are also rumours of a much more expensive €200 million reconstruction on the current stadium's site encompassing a shopping centre, car park, gym and multiplex cinema, rather than a move to the north of the city in Moletolo or Baganzola as sometimes mooted. This would likely require a temporary move away from Parma (probably to the Stadio Mario Rigamonti in Brescia), but any substantial work on the Tardini would require significant external investment.

Rather than renovate the Tardini, the club's leadership has instead opted to make improvements to its wholly owned training centre in Collecchio, completed in late 2012. Municipal support for any work seems especially unlikely after Federico Pizzarotti, elected sindaco of Parma in May 2012, ruled the use of public money out in November 2012. The state of stadium ownership in Italy, where only Juventus owns its own stadium, is widely regarded as unsatisfactory.

The stadium falls short of UEFA competition standards and therefore would not be allowed to host UEFA Champions League or UEFA Europa League matches. The reason for this is the inadequacy of this stadium's facilities. For example, the seats' backrests, which must be at least 30 cm high are below the requirement by 15 cm in some areas of the ground. Such an improvement would require an investment of at least €1,500,000. As well install new seating, the dressing rooms, medical facilities and west stand would require renovation. The cost of these measures means the likely host of any European fixtures played by the club would be Modena F.C.'s Stadio Alberto Braglia.

== International football matches ==
The Italy national team does not have a national stadium and many different venues are used by its teams at all levels. One of these venues is the Stadio Ennio Tardini, although it cannot currently be used for competitive games due to the inadequacy of the seating. This led to the moving of the Italy-Estonia match to the Stadio Alberto Braglia in Modena, which took place on 3 June 2011. It has not been chosen as a host stadium in any of the major tournaments that Italy has hosted to date: the 1934 World Cup, Euro 1968, Euro 1980 and 1990 World Cup, but it was on the provisional list for the failed Euro 2016 bid, despite failing to make the failed Euro 2012 bid list. In September 2020, Moldova's UEFA Nations League game against Kosovo was held at the stadium as Moldova does not recognise Kosovo.

=== Italy national team ===
The Tardini has hosted six full Azzurri international matches, five of which Italy have won. The stadium is one of just over 50 used by the Italians for home games in their history and is one of the fifteen most-used. The first two matches played at the Tardini were pre-World Cup friendlies contested by managers that had previously managed the club – Arrigo Sacchi and Cesare Maldini. The other three matches have been played during the three most recent World Cup qualifying campaigns. The victory over Hungary was Italy's last match of the campaign and secured them qualification to the 2002 World Cup. The Belarus match was played earlier in the campaign, but triumph in Parma did send the Italians top of their group. The most recent competitive international played at the Tardini was a dead rubber. On 29 May 2012, the Tardini was set to host its third senior international friendly, pitting the Italians against Luxembourg, but the fixture was abandoned following a fatal 5.8-magnitude earthquake 36 miles east of Parma. In dedication to the 24 deaths caused by the earthquake, Italy played a friendly against France at the Tardini on 14 November 2012. It also supported an initiative against violence towards women. In front of a sell-out crowd, France won the match 2–1, inflicting a first ever defeat on Italy at the Tardini.

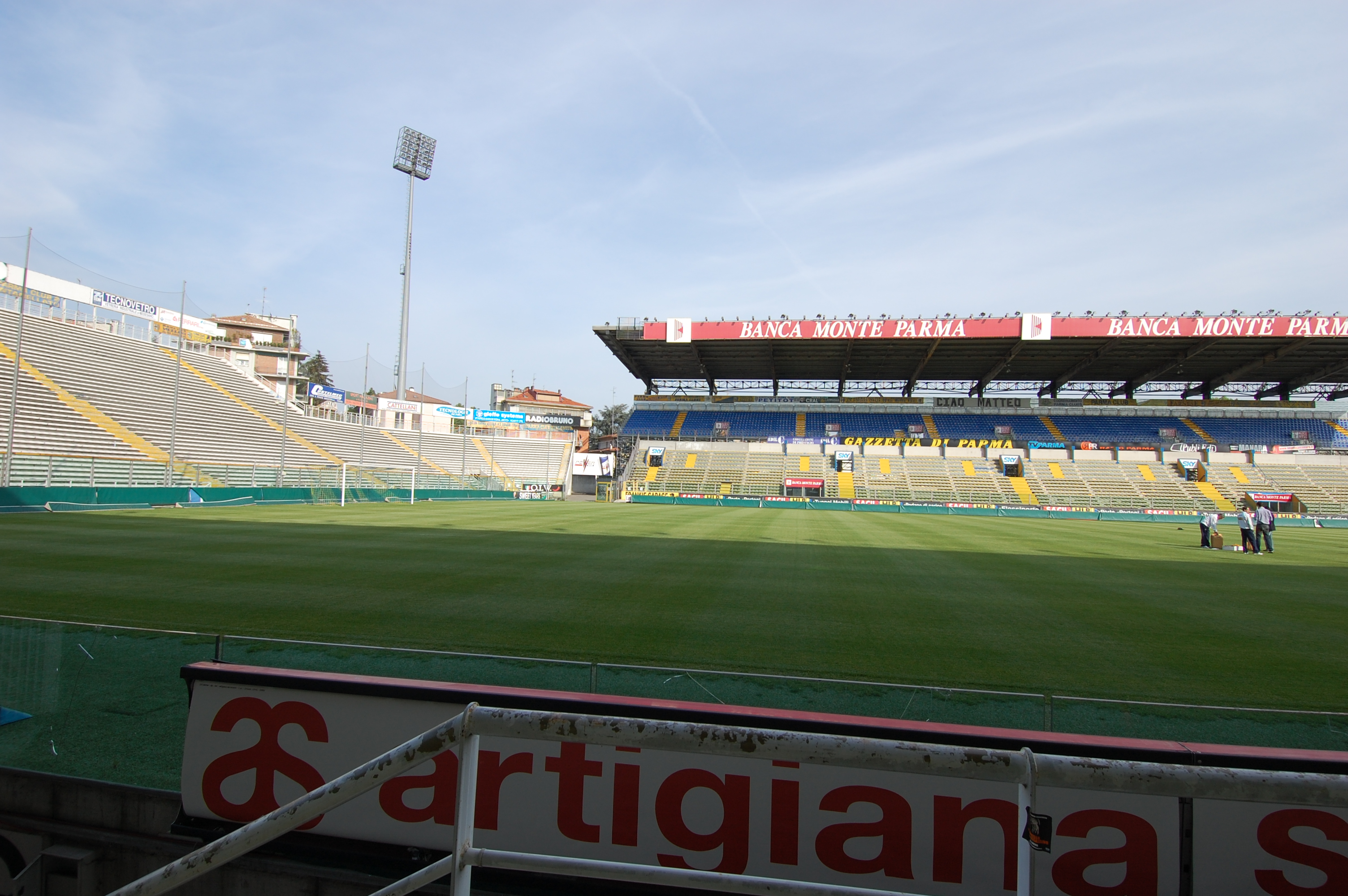
The Tribuna Est seen from the Main Stand.

Date	Opponent	Score	Attendance	Competition
27 May 1994	Finland	2–0	16,714	Friendly
22 April 1998	Paraguay	3–1	21,232	Friendly
6 October 2001	Hungary	1–0	20,545	2002 FIFA World Cup qualification – UEFA Group 8
13 October 2004	Belarus	4–3	16,510	2006 FIFA World Cup qualification – UEFA Group 5
14 October 2009	Cyprus	3–2	15,009	2010 FIFA World Cup qualification – UEFA Group 8
14 November 2012	France	1–2	19,665	Friendly
26 March 2019	Liechtenstein	6–0	19,834	UEFA Euro 2020 qualifying Group J
25 March 2021	Northern Ireland	2–0	0	2022 FIFA World Cup qualification – UEFA Group C

=== Italy under-21 team ===
The Tardini has hosted two Azzurrini international matches. The second of these was the second leg of a two-legged affair, which ended 2–2, a result enough to see the Italians out on away goals after the first leg ended goalless.

Date	Opponent	Score	Competition
28 January 1987	East Germany	1–0	Friendly
9 May 1990	Yugoslavia	2–2	1990 UEFA European Under-21 Football Championship quarter-final

== League attendances ==
Information related to league matches held at the Stadio Ennio Tardini by S.S.D. Parma Calcio 1913 in the last 50 years in the top two tiers of the Italian football league system is listed below.

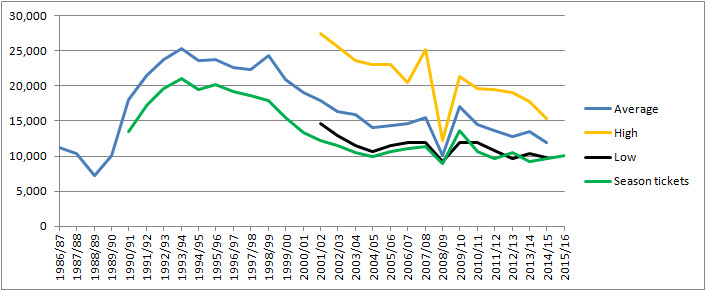
A graphical representation of the attendances at the Tardini since 1986. The yellow line represents the season high, the blue line the season average, the black line the season low, and the green line the season ticket sales.

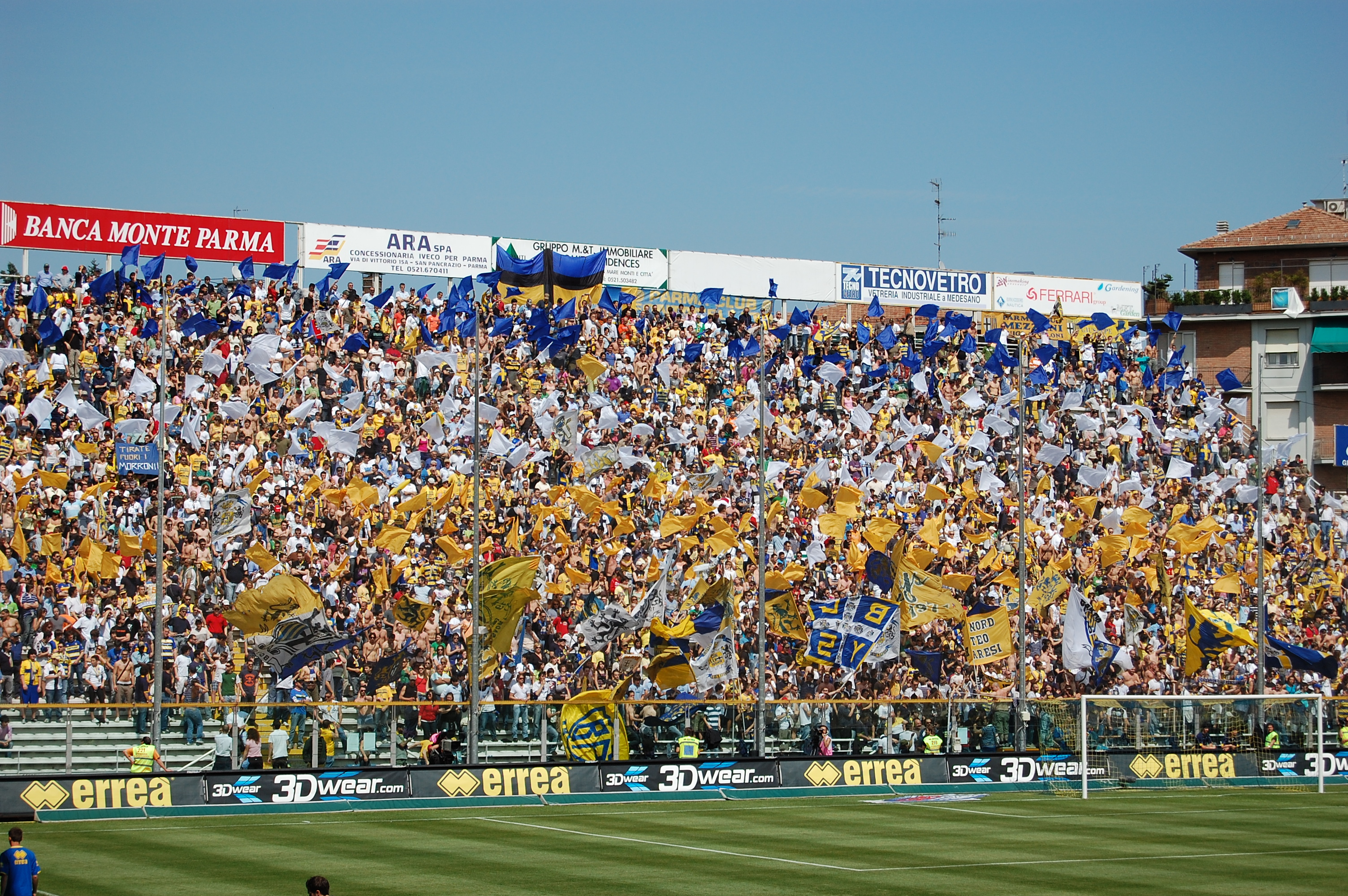
Parma's colourful support in the Curva Nord on matchday.

Season	Average
1962–63 Serie B	6,147
1963–64 Serie B	6,028
1964–65 Serie B	5,531
1973–74 Serie B	10,538
1974–75 Serie B	8,105
1979–80 Serie B	9,543
1984–85 Serie B	8,414
1986–87 Serie B	11,243
1987–88 Serie B	10,292
1988–89 Serie B	7,155
1989–90 Serie B	10,039

Season	Average	Season tickets
1990–91 Serie A	18,005	13,450
1991–92 Serie A	21,553	17,200
1992–93 Serie A	23,792	19,650
1993–94 Serie A	25,364	21,100
1994–95 Serie A	23,636	19,541
1995–96 Serie A	23,731	20,225
1996–97 Serie A	22,601	19,137
1997–98 Serie A	22,385	18,614
1998–99 Serie A	24,328	17,873
1999–00 Serie A	20,938	15,498
2000–01 Serie A	19,008	13,344

Season	Average	High	Low	Season tickets
2001–02 Serie A	17,956	27,498	14,704	12,156
2002–03 Serie A	16,306	25,603	12,980	11,544
2003–04 Serie A	15,904	23,663	11,463	10,439
2004–05 Serie A	14,044	23,010	10,711	9,923
2005–06 Serie A	14,372	23,116	11,575	10,639
2006–07 Serie A	14,644	20,488	11,946	11,120
2007–08 Serie A	15,427	25,149	11,890	11,386
2008–09 Serie B	10,031	12,265	9,261	8,950
2009–10 Serie A	17,061	21,323	11,870	13,691
2010–11 Serie A	14,524	19,615	11,975	10,578
2011–12 Serie A	13,646	19,481	10,800	9,620
2012–13 Serie A	12,740	19,073	9,627	10,546
2013–14 Serie A	13,451	17,740	10,409	9,235
2014–15 Serie A	11,904	15,311	9,772	9,580
2015–16 Serie D	10,972	14,512	10,378	10,089
2016–17 Lega Pro	10,230	15,005	9,480	9,193
2017–18 Serie B	11,385	14,820	9,850	9,330

== Other uses ==
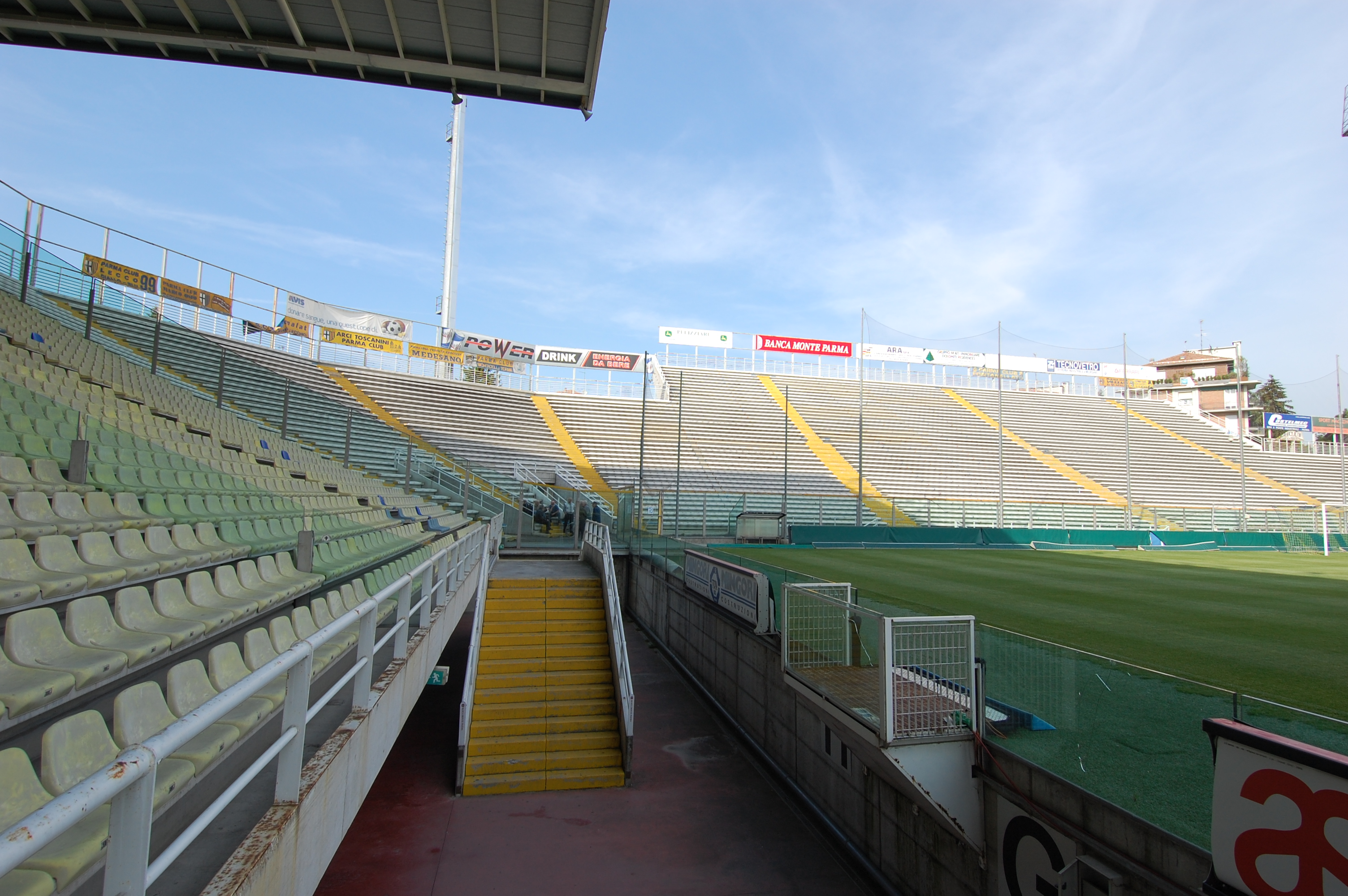
A view of the Curva Nord from the Main Stand.

Rugby Parma F.C. were residents at the Tardini in their early days, including their peak in the 1950s, but the club then moved to the Stadio Fratelli Cervi in the next decade. In the late 2000s, the increasing popularity of rugby union in Italy meant that current ground Stadio Flaminio was becoming less viable as a home ground for Italy and the Stadio Luigi Ferraris in Genoa and the Tardini were suggested as alternative grounds as they are in Northern Italy where rugby is more popular. For the 2012 Six Nations Championship, the Stadio Olimpico, also in Rome, was used.

The Tardini also hosted the deciding game of Italy's American football competition on 8 July 1989 in the Italian Football League's Superbowl Italiano IX. The game pitched Seamen Milano against Frogs Legnano against each other and Frogs Legnano won 39–33.

On 21 December 2012, the Tardini was chosen as the neutral venue to host the Serie A match between Cagliari and Juventus due to the unavailability of the former's home stadium, the Stadio Is Arenas.

== Transport ==
The stadium is in a central location in the city of Parma and is a 30-minute walk along Viale Mentana, then Viale S. Michele before a left at the roundabout onto Viale Partigiani d'Italia. from Parma railway station, which is at the northern edge of the city centre. Alternatively, Buses 8 or 9 can both be taken from the train station to the stadium. A bus service also serves those making use of the A1 parking area outside the city. A direct drive to the stadium involves an exit on the A1 at the Parma junction. UEFA stated that Parma's transport sector was more than capable of supporting UEFA Euro 2016 matches.
