= Fernando Marqués =

Spanish footballer

Personal information
- Full name: José Fernando Marqués Martínez
- Date of birth: 4 December 1984 (age 41)
- Place of birth: Madrid, Spain
- Height: 1.78 m (5 ft 10 in)
- Position: Midfielder

Youth career
- 2000–2001: Rayo Vallecano

Senior career*
Years	Team	Apps	(Gls)
2001–2002	Rayo B		
2002–2004	Rayo Vallecano	35	(2)
2004–2006	Racing Santander	5	(0)
2005	→ Atlético B (loan)	16	(4)
2006	→ Atlético B (loan)	11	(1)
2006	→ Atlético Madrid (loan)	7	(0)
2006	Castellón	1	(0)
2007	Atlético B	9	(1)
2007	Atlético Madrid	2	(0)
2007–2009	Iraklis	29	(1)
2009–2010	Espanyol	21	(1)
2010–2012	Parma	17	(1)
2015–2016	Guadalajara	15	(2)
2018–2019	Santa Ana		
2020	Alcobendas Sport	1	(0)

International career
2003	Spain U20	1	(0)
- * Club domestic league appearances and goals

José Fernando Marqués Martínez (born 4 December 1984) is a Spanish former professional footballer who played as a midfielder.

== Club career ==
Born in Madrid, Marqués first appeared professionally for hometown's Rayo Vallecano, playing ten games in La Liga then 25 in Segunda División. In the 2004–05 season he signed with Racing de Santander, but several bouts of indiscipline made him fall out of favour with the management, and he joined Atlético Madrid on loan in the January transfer window; he spent his first months with the capital side's B-team.

Eventually Marqués failed to settle with both clubs, with which he still had another spell. After less than one month with CD Castellón he joined Greek club Iraklis, remaining in the country until the end of his contract on 16 June 2009.

On 26 June 2009, Marqués was linked with a move to Celtic. Following the initial link with the player the Scottish Premier League club offered him a trial on 14 July, and the player's agent, Manuel Ferrer, was quoted: "Celtic have made a proposal for Fernando to go on trial for a few days. However, this is unsure." He continued: "It's normal in the UK for players to go on trial. In Spain and Europe they do not do this kind of thing. So we are speaking and I hope he will accept"; eventually, nothing came of it.

During the month of August, Marqués went on a week-long trial with RCD Espanyol. On the 25th, after convincing manager Mauricio Pochettino, he secured a contract for the 2009–10 campaign. He scored his first and only goal for the Catalans on 10 January 2010, coming on as a second-half substitute in a 2–1 home win against Real Zaragoza.

Marques was signed by Parma F.C. on 14 July 2010 on loan from Terrassa FC, for €200,000, but injury disrupted his first year at the club and he did not take to the pitch once in the second half of the Serie A season. Nevertheless, the former signed him outright.

Marqués was released in the summer of 2012, but he appealed to the Italian Football Federation as he did not agree to the early termination. The governing body restored the contract, but Parma appealed to both the Italian Federation's Federal Court of Justice and the Tribunale Nazionale di Arbitrato per lo Sport (TNAS) of the Italian National Olympic Committee. The club later withdrew its appeal to the latter, after the contract was finally terminated by mutual consent.
