= Luca Tedeschi =

Italian footballer (born 1987)

Personal information
- Date of birth: 27 February 1987 (age 39)
- Place of birth: Bologna, Italy
- Height: 1.90 m (6 ft 3 in)
- Position: Centre back

Youth career
- –2006: Bologna

Senior career*
| Years | Team | Apps | (Gls) |
| 2004–2007 | Bologna | 1 | (0) |
| 2006–2007 | → Cremonese (loan) | 30 | (0) |
| 2007–2009 | Treviso | 0 | (0) |
| 2008 | → Spezia (loan) | 16 | (0) |
| 2008–2009 | → Ternana (loan) | 26 | (0) |
| 2009–2010 | Ternana | 27 | (0) |
| 2010–2011 | Parma | 0 | (0) |
| 2010–2011 | → Crotone (loan) | 13 | (2) |
| 2011–2012 | Crotone | 24 | (0) |
| 2012–2014 | Parma | 0 | (0) |
| 2012–2013 | → Cremonese (loan) | 25 | (0) |
| 2013–2014 | → Grosseto (loan) | 2 | (0) |
| 2014 | → AlbinoLeffe (loan) | 10 | (0) |
| 2014–2017 | Cosenza | 103 | (4) |
| 2017–2018 | Catania | 29 | (1) |
| 2018–2019 | Pro Vercelli | 19 | (1) |
| 2019–2021 | Carrarese | 26 | (2) |
| 2021–2022 | Renate | 12 | (0) |

International career
| 2004–2005 | Italy U18 | 7 | (0) |
| 2005 | Italy U19 | 1 | (0) |
| 2006–2007 | Italy U20 | 6 | (0) |
- * Club domestic league appearances and goals as of 24 April 2022

Luca Tedeschi (born 27 February 1987) is an Italian footballer who plays as a defender.

== Club career ==
=== Bologna ===
Tedeschi started his career at Bologna. He was a member of the under-17 youth team in 2003–04 season, which plays in the "Allievi Nazionali", a national youth league . He made his Serie A debut on 10 November 2004, in a 2–2 away draw against Internazionale.

He was sent on loan to Serie C1 side Cremonese during the 2006–07 season. He played 30 games in the league as well as 2 additional games in the Italian cup. He also played at least once in the Coppa Italia Serie C.

=== Treviso ===
In mid-2007, Tedeschi was bought by Treviso on a co-ownership deal, for €700,000 fee, with Dino Fava moved to opposite direction also on a co-ownership deal, for €900,000 fee. After making no appearances during the first half of the season, he was sent out to Spezia on loan. On 31 August 2008, he left for Ternana. In June 2009, Treviso signed Tedeschi outright for another €1,000 fee, while Massimo Coda moved to opposite direction for another €100,000, who was bought in 2008 in exchange for Fava. However, Tedeschi became a free agent after Treviso bankrupted in the same transfer window.

=== Parma and loans ===
On 24 July 2009, he left for Parma on a free transfer. He was immediately signed by his former club Ternana on a co-ownership deal for a mere €500. In June 2010, Parma bought back Tedeschi for about €121,000.

Tedeschi left for Crotone on a temporary deal with an option to sign half of the player's registration rights. Crotone excised the rights in July 2011 for €500, and in June 2012, Parma bought back Tedeschi once again, for an undisclosed fee. He was awarded the number 56 shirt, before he left for Cremonese again on 9 August 2012. Parma also subsidized €90,000 to Cremonese as premi di valorizzazione.

On 21 August 2013, Tedeschi was signed by Lega Pro Prima Divisione club Grosseto on another temporary deal. On 31 January 2014, Tedeschi was signed by fellow third division club AlbinoLeffe, on loan from Grosseto. AlbinoLeffe lost the promotion playoffs on 11 May 2014, in which Tedeschi missed the final penalty of the resulting shootout.

=== Cosenza ===
On 8 August 2014, Tedeschi was signed by Lega Pro side Cosenza on a 1-year contract. On 18 July 2015 he was offered a new 2-year deal.

=== Serie C ===
In June 2017, Tedeschi joined Catania on a 2-year contract, effective on the following 1 July. After a season, his contract was cancelled in a mutual consent.

In August 2018, he joined Pro Vercelli on a free transfer.

In mid-2019, he was sold to Carrarese.

On 6 October 2021 he joined Renate.

== International career ==
Tedeschi played for Italy national youth teams at U18, U19, and U20 levels. He was an unused bench at the qualifying round of 2006 UEFA European Under-19 Championship.
