= Gabriele Paonessa =

Italian footballer

Personal information
- Date of birth: April 18, 1987 (age 39)
- Place of birth: Bologna, Italy
- Height: 1.72 m (5 ft 7 1/2 in)
- Position: Attacking midfielder

Youth career
- Napoli
- 2002–2005: Bologna

Senior career*
Years	Team	Apps	(Gls)
2005–2010	Bologna	2	(0)
2006–2007	→ Vicenza (on loan)	26	(4)
2007–2008	→ Avellino (loan)	31	(2)
2009–2010	→ Vicenza (loan)	11	(2)
2010–2015	Parma	0	(0)
2010–2011	→ Cesena (loan)	0	(0)
2011–2012	→ Gubbio (loan)	1	(0)
2012	→ Como (loan)	7	(2)
2012–2013	→ Perugia (loan)	1	(0)
2013	→ Crotone (loan)	2	(0)

International career^{‡}
2006–2009	Italy U-21	6	(1)
- * Club domestic league appearances and goals as of 2 March 2013 ‡ National team caps and goals as of 5 February 2008

Gabriele Paonessa (born 18 April 1987) is an Italian footballer.

== Biography ==
On 10 June 2010 Parma F.C. announced that they had swapped Daniele Paponi for Paonessa, both half card was tagged for €600,000. Both club retained 50% registration rights of the player. Bologna made a profit of €1,140,500 for Paonessa which registered in 2009–10 financial year, but at the same time created a cost of amortization for €1.2 million, spreading from 2010–11 to 2014–15.

Paonessa signed a 5-year contract. From 2010 to 2013 he was loaned to various club, such as Cesena in 2010 and Crotone on 31 January 2013. Crotone also received €100,000 from Parma as premi di valorizzazione. The co-ownership deals were terminated in June 2012. Since 2013 Paonessa failed to find a club to play, despite under contract with Parma until 30 June 2017. He earned just €70,000 in 2010–11 season.

=== International career ===
He made his U-21 team debut against Luxembourg U-21, 12 December 2006, replacing Simone Bentivoglio in the 71st minute and scored his debut goal on the 83rd.
