= Massimo Barbuti =

Italian footballer and manager

Personal information
- Full name: Massimo Barbuti
- Date of birth: 5 August 1958 (age 68)
- Place of birth: San Giuliano Terme, Italy
- Position: Striker

Senior career*
| Years | Team | Apps | (Gls) |
| 1976–1978 | Cerretese | 47 | (20) |
| 1977–1978 | → Ponte a Moriano (loan) | | |
| 1979–1981 | Spezia | 66 | (40) |
| 1981–1982 | Taranto | 30 | (9) |
| 1982–1985 | Parma | 98 | (37) |
| 1985–1987 | Ascoli | 54 | (18) |
| 1987–1988 | Foggia | 34 | (6) |
| 1988–1990 | Viareggio | 44 | (10) |
| 1990–1991 | Rondinella | 24 | (9) |
| 1991–1992 | Treviso | 30 | (12) |

Managerial career
- 2007–2008: Castelnuovo
- * Club domestic league appearances and goals

Massimo Barbuti (born 5 August 1958) is an Italian former football player and manager born in San Giuliano Terme. He made 23 appearances in Serie A (for Ascoli), 67 in Serie B (for Parma and Ascoli), and a further 226 in the lower professional divisions. Barbuti has said his most memorable moments came when he played for Parma, with whose fans he enjoyed a great rapport.
