= Fabio Bonci =

Italian footballer (born 1949)

Personal information
- Date of birth: 31 January 1949 (age 77)
- Place of birth: Modena, Italy
- Height: 1.75 m (5 ft 9 in)
- Position: Striker

Senior career*
Years	Team	Apps	(Gls)
1964–1966	Moglia	36	(16)
1966–1967	Reggiana	11	(1)
1967–1969	Juventus	2	(1)
1969–1970	Varese	4	(0)
1970–1971	Mantova	21	(2)
1971–1972	Parma	36	(20)
1972–1973	Perugia	27	(9)
1973–1974	Atalanta	30	(5)
1974–1975	Parma	36	(14)
1975–1976	Genoa	34	(15)
1976–1978	Cesena	24	(7)
1978–1980	Parma	48	(11)
- * Club domestic league appearances and goals

Fabio Bonci (born 31 January 1949 in Modena) is a retired Italian professional football player.

Bonci played for Serie A's Parma during the 1970s.

His father, Iro Bonci, and uncles Adler Bonci, Emilio Bonci and Remo Bonci all played football professionally.
