= Tommaso Ghirardi =

Italian businessman (born 1975)

- Born: May 10, 1975 (age 51); Brescia, Italy
- Occupation: Businessman

Tommaso Ghirardi (born 10 May 1975 in Brescia) is an Italian businessman, mostly known for having served as chairman (of BoD) and owner of Italian association football club Parma F.C. from January 2007 to December 2014. His main activities are in the mechanics industry.

His entry into football came with the purchase of A.C. Carpenedolo, a small club based near Brescia, when the club was in Serie D. The club turned professional and gained promotion to Serie C2 in 2004 and marginally missed on promotion to Serie C1 two years later after play-off defeat.

On 3 January 2007, Ghirardi bought financially troubled Parma F.C. in an auction for the sale of the club. He sacked Stefano Pioli after just two matches and replaced him with Claudio Ranieri, but the club continued to struggle. Relegation seemed inevitable, but final day victory secured Parma's place in Italy's top division for the following season. He responded by investing around €11M on new players. Despite this, Parma were relegated to Serie B after nineteen consecutive seasons in the top flight.

Life in Serie B started worryingly under Luigi Cagni, who was replaced by Francesco Guidolin and Parma would go on to secure promotion with two games of the season to go. The return to Serie A was the cue for the appointment of Pietro Leonardi as general manager and Andrea Berta (ex-colleague at Carpenedolo) as sporting director. An eighth-place finish and the return of Hernán Crespo saw Ghirardi held in high regard by the fans. A lack of progression since has seen his stock fall.

In the first five years of Ghirardi's presidency (from January 2007 to January 2012), it was estimated that his investment had reached €30m, alongside a further €13m in the club's parent company

On 30 May 2014, Ghirardi announced he would resign as chairman of Parma F.C. and sell his stake in the club. He eventually sold his controlling holding to Cypriot-Russian company Dastraso Holding Limited in December 2014.

Due to his behaviour, he caused the team to go bankrupt, along with his CEO Pietro Leonardi. He will be submitted to judgement in the second half of 2015.
