= Pietro Leonardi =

Italian businessman

- Born: 29 December 1963 (age 62); Rome, Italy
- Occupations: Businessman, football executive
- Years active: 1990s–2015
- Known for: Sporting and managing director of Parma F.C.

Pietro Leonardi (born 29 December 1963 in Rome) is an Italian businessman who served as sporting and managing director of Italian association football club Parma F.C. until 4 March 2015. After the bankruptcy of Parma, he joined Latina. However, he resigned after he was banned from football activities for 5 years by the FIGC, for his mismanagement in Parma.

== Career ==
He began his career as sporting director at Polisportiva Monterotondo Calcio, where he spent three seasons in Serie D in the early 1990s. After a brief spell at L'Aquila Calcio, he went to Empoli, who played in Serie B, with whom he achieved promotion to Serie A. He then spent a few months at Calcio Savoia, before moving to Juventus in 2000, taking up the position of director of youth development. He left the Turin-based side in 2004 and became director-general at Reggiana, before moving to Udinese, to Cisco Roma and back to Udinese again. In June 2009, he joined Parma. He was initially appointed general manager, but promoted to managing director in October 2009 by the shareholders and was given the power to sign players and control the finances after a successful start under his stewardship.

In July 2020, the Parma Court sentenced Leonardi and Ghirardi to 6 and 4 years in prison, respectively, for Parma's bankruptcy.

In March 2023, he was acquitted together with Ghirardi, for not having committed the crime, in relation to the accusation of false invoicing for which he had been under investigation for some years, together with other managers and agents regarding the buying and selling of players.

In January 2025, the Court of Appeal of Bologna confirmed the 6-year prison sentence for fraudulent bankruptcy and false accounting of the former Parma manager.
