= 1993–94 Parma AC season =

Parma
1993–94 season
- Owner: Parmalat
- President: Giorgio Pedraneschi
- Manager: Nevio Scala
- Stadium: Stadio Ennio Tardini
- Serie A: 5th
- Coppa Italia: Semi-finals
- European Cup Winners' Cup: Runners-up
- European Super Cup: Winners
- Top goalscorer: League: Zola (18); All: Zola (22)
Home colours	Away colours

Parma Associazione Calcio once again troubled the top teams in both Italy and Europe, but had to settle for just the curtain-raising UEFA Super Cup as silverware in its ambitious ascent towards the top of Italian football. It almost repeated the victory in the 1992–93 UEFA Cup Winners' Cup by reaching another final, but lost out to Arsenal.

The purchase of Gianfranco Zola from Napoli was successful, given his second place in the topscoring charts, beaten only by Giuseppe Signori of Lazio. Together with Tomas Brolin and Faustino Asprilla, Parma's attack left many teams without a chance, but the defence was not good enough to match the level of champions AC Milan, who conceded less than half of the 35 goals Parma did.

== Players ==
Note: Flags indicate national team as defined under FIFA eligibility rules; some limited exceptions apply. Players may hold more than one non-FIFA nationality.

Pos.	Nation	Player
GK	ITA	Luca Bucci
GK	ITA	Marco Ballotta
DF	ITA	Antonio Benarrivo
DF	ITA	Lorenzo Minotti
DF	ARG	Nestor Sensini
DF	ITA	Luigi Apolloni
DF	ITA	Alberto Di Chiara
DF	BEL	Georges Grün
DF	ITA	David Balleri
DF	ITA	Roberto Maltagliati
DF	ITA	Gianluca Falsini

Pos.	Nation	Player
MF	ITA	Daniele Zoratto
MF	SWE	Tomas Brolin
MF	ITA	Massimo Crippa
MF	ITA	Gabriele Pin
MF	ITA	Salvatore Matrecano
MF	ITA	Fausto Pizzi
MF	ITA	Roberto Colacone
FW	COL	Faustino Asprilla
FW	ITA	Gianfranco Zola
FW	ITA	Alessandro Melli
FW	ITA	Giovanni Sorce

=== Transfers ===
In
Pos.	Name	from	Type
FW	Gianfranco Zola	SSC Napoli	
MF	Massimo Crippa	SSC Napoli	
DF	Nestor Sensini	Udinese	
GK	Luca Bucci	AC Reggiana	
DF	David Balleri	Cosenza	

Out
Pos.	Name	To	Type
GK	Cláudio Taffarel	AC Reggiana	
MF	Marco Osio	Torino	
DF	Cornelio Donati		released
FW	Graziano Mannari	Fiorenzuola	loan
MF	Sergio Berti	River Plate	
MF	Stefano Cuoghi		released
MF	Ivo Pulga	Vicenza	
MF	Fausto Pizzi	Udinese	

== Competitions ==
=== Serie A ===
==== League table ====
Pos	Team	Pld	W	D	L	GF	GA	GD	Pts	Qualification or relegation
3	Lazio	34	17	10	7	55	40	+15	44	Qualification to UEFA Cup
4	Sampdoria	34	18	8	8	64	39	+25	44	Qualification to Cup Winners' Cup
5	Parma	34	17	7	10	50	35	+15	41	Qualification to UEFA Cup
6	Napoli	34	12	12	10	41	35	+6	36	Qualification to UEFA Cup
7	Roma	34	10	15	9	35	30	+5	35	

Source: 1993–94 Serie A, RSSSF.com, Soccerway
Rules for classification: 1) Points; 2) Head-to-head points; 3) Head-to-head goal difference; 4) Goal difference; 5) Goals scored; 6) Draw. (Note: Head-to-head record is used only after all the matches between the teams in question have been played).

==== Results by round ====
Round	1	2	3	4	5	6	7	8	9	10	11	12	13	14	15	16	17	18	19	20	21	22	23	24	25	26	27	28	29	30	31	32	33	34
Ground	H	A	H	A	H	A	H	H	A	H	A	H	A	H	A	H	A	A	H	A	H	A	H	A	A	H	A	H	A	H	A	H	A	H
Result	W	W	L	W	W	D	W	D	W	L	W	W	D	L	W	L	D	L	D	W	W	W	W	L	W	L	W	L	W	D	L	W	L	D
Position	2	2	4	3	2	2	2	2	2	3	2	2	2	3	2	3	4	4	4	4	4	3	2	4	4	3	5	4	4	4	5	4	5	5

Source: Competitive matches
A = Away; H = Home; W = Win; D = Draw; L = Loss; = 1994–95 UEFA Champions League; = 1994–95 UEFA Cup

==== Matches ====
29 August 1993 1	Udinese	0–1	Parma	Udine
		Report	Melli 17'	Stadium: Stadio Friuli; Referee: Angelo Amendolia

5 September 1993 2	Parma	1–0	Lecce	Parma
	Zola 29' (pen.)	Report		Stadium: Stadio Ennio Tardini; Referee: Pasquale Rodomonti

8 September 1993 3	Lazio	2–1	Parma	Rome
	Fuser 28'; Cravero 48' (pen.)	Report	Zola 40'	Stadium: Stadio Olimpico; Referee: Pierluigi Pairetto

12 September 1993 4	Parma	2–1	Genoa	Parma
	Zola 1'; Crippa 87'	Report	Petrescu 19'	Stadium: Stadio Ennio Tardini; Referee: Stefano Braschi

19 September 1993 5	Parma	3–0	Torino	Parma
	Asprilla 59', 67', 90'	Report		Stadium: Stadio Ennio Tardini; Referee: Gianni Beschin

26 September 1993 6	Sampdoria	1–1	Parma	Genoa
	Lombardo 3'	Report	29' (o.g.) Sacchetti	Stadium: Luigi Ferraris; Referee: Trentalange, Turin

3 October 1993 7	Parma	3–0	Foggia	Parma
	Zola 18', 86'; Asprilla 70'	Report		Stadium: Stadio Ennio Tardini; Referee: Racalbuto (Gallarate)

17 October 1993 8	Cremonese	0–0	Parma	Cremona
		Report		Stadium: Stadio Giovanni Zini; Referee: Nicchi (Arezzo)

24 October 1993 9	Parma	1–0	Reggiana	Parma
	Melli 14'	Report		Stadium: Stadio Ennio Tardini; Referee: Cinciripini (Ascoli Piceno)

31 October 1993 10	Inter Milan	3–2	Parma	Milan
	Sosa 16', 37', 65'	Report	10' Grün; 77' Minotti	Stadium: Stadio Giuseppe Meazza; Referee: Collina (Viareggio)

7 November 1993 11	Parma	2–0	Juventus	Parma
	Zola 83'; Brolin 87' (pen.)	Report		Stadium: Ennio Tardini; Referee: Livio Bazzoli

21 November 1993 12	Atalanta	0–2	Parma	Bergamo
		Report	Brolin 63'; Zola 84'	Stadium: Comunale; Referee: Luciano Luci

28 November 1993 13	Parma	0–0	AC Milan	Parma
		Report		Stadium: Stadio Ennio Tardini; Referee: Ceccarini (Livorno)

5 December 1993 14	A.S. Roma	2–0	Parma	Rome
	Comi 18'; Cappioli 74'	Report		Stadium: Olimpico; Referee: Fabio Baldas

12 December 1993 15	Cagliari	0–4	Parma	Cagliari
		Report	Asprilla 40'; Melli 65'; Melli 72'; Zola	Stadium: Sant'Elia; Referee: Gianni Beschin

19 December 1993 16	Parma	1–3	Napoli	Parma
	Brolin 33' (pen.)	Report	3' Gambaro; 60' Fonseca; 82' Thern	Stadium: Stadio Ennio Tardini; Referee: Pairetto (Nichelino)

2 January 1994 17	Piacenza	1–1	Parma	Piacenza
	Ferrante 21'	Report	39' Balleri	Stadium: Stadio Galleana; Referee: Boggi (Salerno)

9 January 1994 18	Parma	0–1	Udinese	Parma
		Report	Bertotto 33'	Stadium: Stadio Ennio Tardini; Referee: Loris Stafoggia

16 January 1994 19	Lecce	1–1	Parma	Lecce
	Ayew 32'	Report	Minotti 51'	Stadium: Via del Mare; Referee: Francesco Arena

23 January 1994 20	Parma	2–0	Lazio	Parma
	Chiara 3'; Asprilla 89'	Report		Stadium: Ennio Tardini; Referee: Angelo Amendiola

30 January 1994 21	Genoa	0–4	Parma	Genoa
		Report	43', 90' Zola; 45' Brolin; 85' (pen.) Asprilla	Stadium: Stadio Luigi Ferraris; Referee: Luci (Florence)

6 February 1994 22	Torino	1–2	Parma	Turin
14:30 UTC+1	Francescoli 54'	Report	27' Apolloni; 53' Zola	Stadium: Stadio delle Alpi; Attendance: 24.536; Referee: Stafoggia (Pesaro)

13 February 1994 23	Parma	2–1	Sampdoria	Parma
	Minotti 73'; Zola 90'	Report	28' Jugović	Stadium: Stadio Ennio Tardini; Referee: Collina (Viareggio)

20 February 1994 24	Foggia	3–2	Parma	Foggia
	Cappellini 35'; Kolyvanov 68', 88'	Report	11' Zola; 18' Asprilla	Stadium: Stadio Pino Zaccheria; Referee: Cinciripini (Ascoli Piceno)

27 February 1994 25	Parma	2–1	Cremonese	Parma
	Melli 57'; Zola 85' (pen.)	Report	62' Maspero	Stadium: Stadio Ennio Tardini; Referee: Ceccarini (Livorno)

6 March 1994 26	Reggiana	2–0	Parma	Reggio Emilia
	Esposito 49'; Padovano 68' (pen.)	Report		Stadium: Stadio Mirabello; Referee: Pairetto (Nichelino)

13 March 1994 27	Parma	4–1	Inter Milan	Parma
	Zola 45', 58'; Asprilla 63'; Brolin 90'	Report	69' Sosa	Stadium: Stadio Ennio Tardini; Referee: Bettin (Padua)

20 March 1994 28	Juventus	4–0	Parma	Turin
	Del Piero 20'; Del Piero 57'; Ravanelli 77'; Del Piero 87'	Report		Stadium: Delle Alpi; Referee: Loris Stafoggia

25 March 1994 29	Parma	2–1	Atalanta	Parma
	Minotti 13'; Apolloni 48'	Report	Apolloni 11' (o.g)	Stadium: Ennio Tardini; Referee: Gennaro Borriello

2 April 1994 30	AC Milan	1–1	Parma	Milan
	Massaro 73'	Report	84' (pen.) Zola	Stadium: Stadio Giuseppe Meazza; Referee: Boggi (Salerno)

9 April 1994 31	Parma	0–2	A.S. Roma	Parma
		Report	Balbo 18'; Festa 89'	Stadium: Ennio Tardini; Referee: Fabio Baldas

17 April 1994 32	Parma	3–1	Cagliari	Parma
	Asprilla 30'; Zola 45'; Crippa 78'		Crinti 89'	Stadium: Ennio Tardini; Referee: Virginio Quartuccio

24 April 1994 33	Napoli	2–0	Parma	Napoli
	Buso 20'; Ferrara 45'	Report		Stadium: Stadio San Paolo; Referee: Cinciripini (Ascoli Piceno)

29 April 1994 34	Parma	0–0	Piacenza	Parma
		Report		Stadium: Stadio Ennio Tardini; Referee: Baldas (Trieste)

=== Coppa Italia ===
Quarterfinals

4 January 1993	Foggia	0–3	Parma	Foggia
			12' Brolin; 52' Zola; 72' Asprilla	Stadium: Stadio Pino Zaccheria; Referee: Luci

26 January 1994	Parma	6–1	Foggia	Parma
	Brolin 15', 75'; Zola 41'; Sorce 77' (pen.); Di Chiara II 82'; Matrecano 90'		56' Stroppa	Stadium: Stadio Ennio Tardini; Referee: Pellegrino

Semifinals

8 February 1994	Sampdoria	2–1	Parma	Genoa
	Lombardo 55'; Platt 56'		31' Asprilla	Stadium: Stadio Luigi Ferraris; Referee: Bazzoli

23 February 1994	Parma	0–1	Sampdoria	Parma
			22' Gullit	Stadium: Stadio Ennio Tardini; Referee: Beschin

=== European Cup Winners' Cup ===
==== First round ====
14 September 1993 First leg	Degerfors (Sweden)	1–2	(Italy) Parma	Degerfors, Sweden
	Berger 72'		Asprilla 87', 88'	Stadium: Stora Valla

28 September 1993 Second leg	Parma (Italy)	2–0 (4–1 agg.)	(Sweden) Degerfors	Parma, Italy
	Brolin 2', 67'			Stadium: Stadio Ennio Tardini

==== Second round ====
20 October 1993 First leg	Maccabi Haifa (Israel)	0–1	(Italy) Parma	Haifa, Israel
			Brolin 90'	Stadium: Kiryat Eliezer Stadium

3 November 1993 Second leg	Parma (Italy)	0–1 (a.e.t.) (1–1 agg.) (3–1 p)	(Israel) Maccabi Haifa	Parma, Italy
			Mizrahi 51'	Stadium: Stadio Ennio Tardini
	Penalties
	Crippa (penalty scored); Minotti (penalty scored); Brolin (penalty scored)		(penalty missed) Mizrahi; (penalty scored) Glam; (penalty missed) Harazi; (penalty missed) Atar

==== Quarter-finals ====
3 March 1994 First leg	Ajax (Netherlands)	0–0	(Italy) Parma	Amsterdam, Netherlands
20:00				Stadium: Olympic Stadium; Attendance: 42,000; Referee: Philip Don (England)

16 March 1994 Second leg	Parma (Italy)	2–0 (2–0 agg.)	(Netherlands) Ajax	Parma, Italy
17:45	Minotti 16'; Brolin 49'			Stadium: Stadio Ennio Tardini; Attendance: 24,212; Referee: Frans van den Wijngaert (Belgium)

==== Semi-finals ====
29 March 1994 First leg	Benfica (Portugal)	2–1	(Italy) Parma	Lisbon, Portugal
21:00	Isaías 11'; Rui Costa 60'		Zola 13'	Stadium: Estádio da Luz; Attendance: 80,000; Referee: Bernd Heynemann (Germany)

13 April 1994 Second leg	Parma (Italy)	1–0 (2a–2 agg.)	(Portugal) Benfica	Parma, Italy
17:45	Sensini 74'			Stadium: Stadio Ennio Tardini; Attendance: 21,500; Referee: Mario van der Ende (Netherlands)

==== Final ====
4 May 1994 Final	Arsenal (England)	1–0	(Italy) Parma	Copenhagen, Denmark
20:15	Smith 22'; Adams (yellow card) 25'; Selley (yellow card) 51'; Campbell (yellow card) 78'		Crippa (yellow card) 44'; Asprilla (yellow card) 45'	Stadium: Parken Stadium; Attendance: 33,765; Referee: Václav Krondl (Czech Republic)

=== European Super Cup ===
First leg	Parma (Italy)	0–1	(Italy) AC Milan

Second leg	AC Milan (Italy)	0–2 (1–2 agg.)	(Italy) Parma

== Statistics ==
=== Players statistics ===
No.	Pos	Nat	Player	Total		Serie A		Coppa		UEFA CWC	
No.	Pos	Nat	Player	Apps	Goals	Apps	Goals	Apps	Goals	Apps	Goals
	GK	(Italy) ITA	Bucci	41	-37	32	-32	0	0	9	-5
	DF	(Italy) ITA	Benarrivo	41	0	28	0	6	0	7	0
	DF	(Italy) ITA	Minotti	47	5	33	4	7	0	7	1
	DF	(Argentina) ARG	Sensini	31	1	20	0	6	0	5	1
	DF	(Italy) ITA	Apolloni	43	2	30	2	5	0	8	0
	DF	(Italy) ITA	Di Chiara	39	2	29	1	4	1	6	0
	MF	(Italy) ITA	Zoratto	31	0	19+2	0	3	0	7	0
	MF	(Sweden) SWE	Brolin	45	12	29	5	7	4	9	3
	MF	(Italy) ITA	Crippa	46	3	31	2	6	1	9	0
	FW	(Colombia) COL	Asprilla	42	16	24+3	10	7	4	8	2
	FW	(Italy) ITA	Zola	49	22	33	18	7	3	9	1
	GK	(Italy) ITA	Ballotta	11	-10	2+1	-3	8	-7	0	0
	DF	(Belgium) BEL	Grün	21	1	16	1	1	0	4	0
	MF	(Italy) ITA	Pin	37	0	15+7	0	8	0	7	0
	FW	(Italy) ITA	Melli	32	8	13+9	5	6	3	4	0
	DF	(Italy) ITA	Balleri	35	2	10+10	1	8	0	7	1
	MF	(Italy) ITA	Matrecano	25	1	6+10	0	6	1	3	0
	DF	(Italy) ITA	Maltagliati	16	0	4+6	0	4	0	2	0
	MF	(Italy) ITA	Pizzi	4	0	0+3	0	1	0	0	0
	FW	(Italy) ITA	Sorce	2	1	0+1	0	1	1	0	0
	MF	(Italy) ITA	Colacone	2	0	0+1	0	0	0	1	0
	DF	(Italy) ITA	Falsini	1	0	0+1	0	0	0	0	0

- Source: http://calcio-seriea.net/presenze/1993/1069/
