= 1992–93 Parma AC season =

Parma
1992–93 season
- Owner: Parmalat
- President: Giorgio Pedraneschi
- Manager: Nevio Scala
- Stadium: Ennio Tardini
- Serie A: 3rd
- Supercoppa Italiana: Runners-up
- Coppa Italia: Quarter-finals
- European Cup Winners' Cup: Winners
- Top goalscorer: League: Alessandro Melli (12); All: Alessandro Melli (15)
Home colours	Away colours

Parma Associazione Calcio played its third consecutive season in Serie A, and had arguably its best ever season, even when considering its success in the late 1990s. It finished third in the domestic league competition and won the UEFA Cup Winners' Cup following a 3–1 final victory against Royal Antwerp.

== Players ==
Note: Flags indicate national team as defined under FIFA eligibility rules; some limited exceptions apply. Players may hold more than one non-FIFA nationality.

Pos.	Nation	Player
GK	BRA	Cláudio Taffarel
GK	ITA	Marco Ballotta
GK	ITA	Marco Ferrari
DF	ITA	Antonio Benarrivo
DF	ITA	Alberto Di Chiara
DF	ITA	Lorenzo Minotti
DF	ITA	Luigi Apolloni
DF	BEL	Georges Grün
DF	ITA	Stefano Nava
DF	ITA	Cornelio Donati
DF	ITA	Salvatore Matrecano
DF	ITA	Gianluca Franchini

Pos.	Nation	Player
MF	SWE	Tomas Brolin
MF	ITA	Daniele Zoratto
MF	ITA	Stefano Cuoghi
MF	ITA	Gabriele Pin
MF	ITA	Ivo Pulga
MF	ARG	Sergio Berti
MF	ITA	Marco Osio
MF	ITA	Fausto Pizzi
MF	ITA	Aldo Monza
FW	COL	Faustino Asprilla
FW	ITA	Giovanni Sorce
FW	ITA	Alessandro Melli
FW	ITA	Gianluca Hervatin

=== Transfers ===
In
Pos.	Name	from	Type
FW	Faustino Asprilla	Atletico Nacional	
MF	Gabriele Pin	SS Lazio	
MF	Fausto Pizzi	Internazionale	
MF	Sergio Berti	River Plate	
MF	Salvatore Matrecano	Foggia	
DF	Gianluca Franchini	Avellino	
MF	Aldo Monza	Modena	loan ended
MF	Giovanni Sorce	Lucchese	loan ended
GK	Marco Ferrari	Avellino	loan ended

Out
Pos.	Name	To	Type
MF	Aldo Monza	Cosenza	
MF	Tarcisio Catanese	Bologna FC	
FW	Graziano Mannari	Pisa	loan
FW	Massimo Agostini	Ancona	

== Competitions ==
=== Serie A ===
==== League table ====
Pos	Team	Pld	W	D	L	GF	GA	GD	Pts	Qualification or relegation
1	Milan (C)	34	18	14	2	65	32	+33	50	Qualification to European Cup
2	Internazionale	34	17	12	5	59	36	+23	46	Qualification to UEFA Cup
3	Parma (Note: Parma qualified to 1993–94 UEFA Cup Winners' Cup as defending champions.)	34	16	9	9	47	34	+13	41	Qualification to Cup Winners' Cup
4	Juventus	34	15	9	10	59	47	+12	39	Qualification to UEFA Cup
5	Lazio	34	13	12	9	65	51	+14	38	Qualification to UEFA Cup

Source: 1992–93 Serie A, RSSSF.com
Rules for classification: 1) Points; 2) Head-to-head points; 3) Head-to-head goal difference; 4) Goal difference; 5) Goals scored; 6) Draw.(Note:
(C) Champions

==== Results by round ====
Round	1	2	3	4	5	6	7	8	9	10	11	12	13	14	15	16	17	18	19	20	21	22	23	24	25	26	27	28	29	30	31	32	33	34
Ground	A	H	A	H	H	A	H	A	H	A	H	A	A	H	A	H	A	H	A	H	A	A	H	A	H	A	H	A	H	H	A	H	A	H
Result	L	W	L	W	L	W	L	L	W	W	W	L	D	D	W	L	D	D	L	D	W	W	D	W	W	W	W	L	W	D	W	D	W	D
Position	14	6	12	7	10	8	10	13	11	7	6	9	10	10	5	8	8	8	9	9	9	8	8	7	4	3	3	3	3	4	3	3	3	3

Source: Competitive matches
A = Away; H = Home; W = Win; D = Draw; L = Loss; = Leader, 1993–94 UEFA Champions League; = 1993–94 UEFA Cup; = 1993–94 Serie B

==== Matches ====
6 September 1992 1	Atalanta	2–1	Parma	Bergamo
	Ganz 26'; Rambaudi 79' (pen.)	Report	Taffarel (red card) 78'; Melli 88'	Stadium: Stadio Comunale; Referee: Angelo Amendolia

13 September 1992 2	Parma	3–1	Udinese	Parma
	Grün 4'; Asprilla 45'; Melli 68'	Report	Balbo 50'; Mandorlini (red card) 61'	Stadium: Stadio Ennio Tardini; Attendance: 22,220; Referee: Roberto Bettin

20 September 1992 3	Torino	3–0	Parma	Turin
	Aguilera 22', 45'; Casagrande 66'	Report		Stadium: Stadio delle Alpi; Referee: Gianni Beschin

27 September 1992 4	Parma	2–0	Brescia	Parma
	Osio 25'; Cuoghi 41'; Zoratto (red card) 85'	Report	Bonometti (red card) 79'	Stadium: Stadio Ennio Tardini; Referee: Giuseppe Rosica

4 October 1992 5	Lazio	5–2	Parma	Rome
	Signori 13', 34', 70' (pen.); Fuser 25', 37'	Report	Osio 31', 44'	Stadium: Stadio Olimpico; Referee: Carlo Sguizzato

18 October 1992 6	Parma	3–0	Ancona	Parma
	Melli 48'; Pizzi 52' (pen.); Minotti 89'	Report		Stadium: Stadio Ennio Tardini; Referee: Vincenzo Fucci

25 October 1992 7	Parma	0–2	Milan	Parma
		Report	Papin 62'; Eranio 90'	Stadium: Stadio Ennio Tardini; Attendance: 26,727; Referee: Alfredo Trentalange

1 November 1992 8	Foggia	1–0	Parma	Foggia
	Fornaciari (red card) 83'; Biagioni 90' (pen.)	Report		Stadium: Stadio Pino Zaccheria; Referee: Pasquale Rodomonti

8 November 1992 9	Parma	1–0	Pescara	Parma
	Pizzi 64'	Report	Sivebaek (red card) 67'	Stadium: Stadio Ennio Tardini; Referee: Paolo Fabricatore

22 November 1992 10	Cagliari	0–1	Parma	Cagliari
		Report	Brolin 74'	Stadium: Stadio Sant'Elia; Referee: Piero Ceccarini

29 November 1992 11	Parma	1–0	Sampdoria	Parma
	Asprilla 51'	Report		Stadium: Stadio Ennio Tardini; Referee: Pierluigi Pairetto

6 December 1992 12	Roma	1–0	Parma	Rome
	Zinetti (red card) 39'; Rizzitelli 89'	Report		Stadium: Stadio Olimpico; Referee: Alfredo Trentalange

13 December 1992 13	Parma	1–1	Fiorentina	Parma
	Grün 59'	Report	Baiano 54'	Stadium: Stadio Ennio Tardini; Referee: Carlo Sguizzato

3 January 1993 14	Juventus	2–2	Parma	Turin
	R. Baggio 52'; Vialli 84'	Report	Kohler 41' (o.g.); Melli 72'	Stadium: Stadio delle Alpi; Referee: Marcello Nicchi

10 January 1993 15	Parma	1–0	Genoa	Parma
	Minotti 74'	Report		Stadium: Stadio Ennio Tardini; Referee: Gianni Beschin

17 January 1993 16	Internazionale	2–1	Parma	Milan
	Sosa 60'; Berti 72'	Report	Melli 21'	Stadium: San Siro; Referee: Walter Cinciripini

24 January 1993 17	Parma	1–1	Napoli	Parma
	Asprilla 52'; Zoratto (red card) 79'	Report	Fonseca 62'	Stadium: Stadio Ennio Tardini; Referee: Pierluigi Collina

31 January 1993 18	Parma	0–0	Atalanta	Parma
		Report		Stadium: Stadio Ennio Tardini; Referee: Giovanni Merlino

7 February 1993 19	Udinese	1–0	Parma	Udine
	Balbo 60'	Report	Matrecano (red card) 85'	Stadium: Stadio Friuli; Referee: Marcello Nicchi

14 February 1993 20	Parma	2–2	Torino	Parma
	Brolin 59' (pen.); Melli 90'	Report	Sergio 45'; Mussi 89', (red card) 90'	Stadium: Stadio Ennio Tardini; Referee: Luciano Luci

28 February 1993 21	Brescia	0–1	Parma	Brescia
		Report	Hagi 75' (o.g.)	Stadium: Stadio Mario Rigamonti; Referee: Pierluigi Pairetto

7 March 1993 22	Parma	2–1	Lazio	Parma
	Melli 15', 75'	Report	Luzardi (red card) 74'; Cravero 87'	Stadium: Stadio Ennio Tardini; Referee: Walter Cinciripini

14 March 1993 23	Ancona	1–1	Parma	Ancona
	Sogliano 38'	Report	Melli 86'	Stadium: Stadio del Conero; Referee: Salvatore Racalbuto

21 March 1993 24	Milan	0–1	Parma	Milan
		Report	Asprilla 58'	Stadium: San Siro; Referee: Graziano Cesari

28 March 1993 25	Parma	4–0	Foggia	Parma
	Brolin 28'; Asprilla 45'; Melli 47'; Di Chiara 59'	Report		Stadium: Stadio Ennio Tardini; Referee: Angelo Amendolia

4 April 1993 26	Pescara	0–2	Parma	Pescara
		Report	Matrecano 3'; Brolin 45'	Stadium: Stadio Adriatico; Referee: Roberto Bettin

10 April 1993 27	Parma	3–1	Cagliari	Parma
	Firicano 16' (o.g.); Minotti 39'; Asprilla 56'	Report	Napoli (red card) 13'; Herrera 24'	Stadium: Stadio Ennio Tardini; Referee: Massimo Chiesa

17 April 1993 28	Sampdoria	2–1	Parma	Genoa
	Mancini 30' (pen.); Lombardo 52'	Report	Pizzi 87'	Stadium: Stadio Luigi Ferraris; Referee: Robert Anthony Boggi

25 April 1993 29	Parma	3–1	Roma	Parma
	Osio 4', 77'; Pizzi 14' (pen.)	Report	Aldair 74'	Stadium: Stadio Ennio Tardini; Referee: Fabio Baldas

8 May 1993 30	Fiorentina	1–1	Parma	Florence
	Di Mauro 89'	Report	Melli 43'	Stadium: Stadio Artemio Franchi; Referee: Pierluigi Pairetto

15 May 1993 31	Parma	2–1	Juventus	Parma
	Osio 48', 58'	Report	R. Baggio 39'	Stadium: Stadio Ennio Tardini; Referee: Roberto Bettin

23 May 1993 32	Genoa	1–1	Parma	Genoa
	Padovano 65' (pen.)	Report	Asprilla 27'	Stadium: Stadio Luigi Ferraris; Referee: Loris Stafoggia

30 May 1993 33	Parma	2–0	Internazionale	Parma
	Melli 17'; Asprilla (red card) 25'; Cuoghi 82'	Report	Berti (red card) 25'	Stadium: Stadio Ennio Tardini; Referee: Walter Cinciripini

6 June 1993 34	Napoli	1–1	Parma	Naples
	Policano 64'	Report	Pizzi 87'	Stadium: Stadio San Paolo; Referee: Salvatore Racalbuto

=== Second round ===
26 August 1992 First Leg	Parma	1 – 0	Lecce	Parma
	Minotti 48' (pen.)			Stadium: Stadio Ennio Tardini; Referee: Massimo Chiesa

2 September 1992 Second Leg	Lecce	0 – 0	Parma	Lecce
				Stadium: Stadio Via del Mare; Referee: Piero Ceccarini

==== Round of 16 ====
7 October 1992 First Leg	Parma	1 – 0	Venezia	Parma
20:30 CEST (UTC+01:00)	Asprilla 33'			Stadium: Stadio Ennio Tardini; Referee: Robert Anthony Boggi

28 October 1992 Second Leg	Venezia	1 – 1	Parma	Venice
20:30 CEST (UTC+01:00)	Bonaldi 25'		Minotti 80'	Stadium: Stadio Pier Luigi Penzo; Referee: Fabio Baldas

==== Quarter-finals ====
27 January 1993 First Leg	Juventus	2 – 1	Parma	Turin
	D. Baggio (yellow card) 27'; De Marchi (yellow card) 73'; Vialli 78', 85'		Brolin 80'	Stadium: Stadio delle Alpi; Attendance: 5,636; Referee: Loris Stafoggia

10 February 1993 Second Leg	Parma	1 – 1	Juventus	Parma
19:45 CEST (UTC+01:00)	Brolin 36' (pen.); Minotti (red card) 80'		Marocchi (yellow card) 8'; Casiraghi (yellow card) 35'; Möller (yellow card) 37', (goal) 63'; Kohler (yellow card) 80'	Stadium: Stadio Ennio Tardini; Attendance: 19,768; Referee: Piero Ceccarini

==== Supercoppa Italiana ====
30 August 1992	Milan	2 – 1	Parma	Milan, Italy
20:30 CEST (UTC+02:00)	Van Basten 14'; Massaro 70'; Baresi (yellow card)	Report	Melli 45'; Matrecano (yellow card); Zoratto (yellow card)	Stadium: San Siro; Attendance: 30,102; Referee: Pierluigi Pairetto

=== European Cup Winners' Cup ===
==== First round ====
16 September 1992 First leg	Parma (Italy)	1–0	(Hungary) Újpest	Parma, Italy
	Asprilla 48'			Stadium: Stadio Ennio Tardini

1 October 1992 Second leg	Újpest (Hungary)	1–1 (1–2 agg.)	(Italy) Parma	Újpest, Hungary
	Hetesi 62'		Grün 52'	Stadium: Ferenc Szusza Stadium

==== Second round ====
21 October 1992 First leg	Parma (Italy)	0–0	(Portugal) Boavista	Parma, Italy
				Stadium: Stadio Ennio Tardini; Attendance: Jan Damgaard (Denmark)

4 November 1992 Second leg	Boavista (Portugal)	0–2 (0–2 agg.)	(Italy) Parma	Porto, Portugal
			Nogueira 11' (o.g.); Melli 78'	Stadium: Estádio do Bessa; Referee: Hans-Jürgen Weber (Germany)

==== Quarter-finals ====
3 March 1993 First leg	Sparta Prague (Czech Republic)	0–0	(Italy) Parma	Prague, Czech Republic
				Stadium: Stadion Letná; Referee: Alfred Wieser (Austria)

17 March 1993 Second leg	Parma (Italy)	2–0 (2–0 agg.)	(Czech Republic) Sparta Prague	Parma, Italy
14:30 CEST (UTC+01:00)	Melli 10'; Asprilla 33'		Hornak (red card) 75'	Stadium: Stadio Ennio Tardini; Referee: John Blankenstein (Netherlands)

==== Semi-finals ====
6 April 1993 First leg	Atlético Madrid (Spain)	1–2	(Italy) Parma	Madrid, Spain
	Schuster (yellow card) 31'; Juanma (yellow card) 35'; García 44'; Juanito (yellow card) 49'		Zoratto (yellow card) 21'; Asprilla (yellow card) 29', (goal) 57', 62'; Di Chiara (yellow card) 47'	Stadium: Vicente Calderón; Attendance: 55,000; Referee: Philip Don (England)

22 April 1993 Second leg	Parma (Italy)	0–1 (2a–2 agg.)	(Spain) Atlético Madrid	Parma, Italy
			Sabas 77'; Juanito (red card) 89'	Stadium: Stadio Ennio Tardini; Attendance: 21,915; Referee: Aron Schmidhuber (Germany)

==== Final ====
12 May 1993 Final	Parma (Italy)	3–1	(Belgium) Royal Antwerp	London, England
19:15 GMT	Minotti 9'; Melli 30'; Di Chiara (yellow card) 32'; Cuoghi 84'		Severeyns 11', (yellow card) 37'; Segers (yellow card) 65'; Broeckaert (yellow card) 82'	Stadium: Wembley Stadium; Attendance: 37,393; Referee: Karl-Josef Assenmacher (Germany)

== Statistics ==
=== Players statistics ===
No.	Pos	Nat	Player	Total		Serie A		Coppa		UEFA CWC	
No.	Pos	Nat	Player	Apps	Goals	Apps	Goals	Apps	Goals	Apps	Goals
	GK	(Italy) ITA	Ballotta	41	-29	28+1	-22	5	-3	7	-4
	DF	(Italy) ITA	Benarrivo	30	0	20	0	4	0	6	0
	DF	(Italy) ITA	Minotti	48	6	33	3	6	2	9	1
	DF	(Belgium) BEL	Grün	38	3	27	2	3	0	8	1
	DF	(Italy) ITA	Apolloni	45	0	31	0	6	0	8	0
	DF	(Italy) ITA	Di Chiara	42	1	30	1	5	0	7	0
	MF	(Italy) ITA	Zoratto	40	0	27	0	6	0	7	0
	MF	(Italy) ITA	Pin	46	0	30+3	0	5	0	8	0
	MF	(Italy) ITA	Osio	32	7	21+2	7	5	0	4	0
	FW	(Colombia) COL	Asprilla	38	11	19+7	7	6	1	6	3
	FW	(Italy) ITA	Melli	39	15	26+2	12	3	0	8	3
	GK	(Brazil) BRA	Taffarel	9	-12	6	-11	1	-1	2	0
	MF	(Italy) ITA	Cuoghi	34	3	19+3	2	4	0	8	1
	MF	(Sweden) SWE	Brolin	30	6	18+4	4	2	2	6	0
	MF	(Italy) ITA	Pizzi	30	5	15+5	5	3	0	7	0
	MF	(Italy) ITA	Matrecano	29	1	13+7	1	4	0	5	0
	MF	(Italy) ITA	Pulga	12	0	3+9	0				
	FW	(Italy) ITA	Ferrante	11	0	2+9	0	0	0		
	FW	(Italy) ITA	Hervantin	9	0	2+6	0	0	0	1	0
	MF	(Argentina) ARG	Berti	7	0	2+2	0	3	0		
	MF	(Italy) ITA	Franchini	5	0	2+2	0	0	0	1	0
	DF	(Italy) ITA	Donati	4	0	0+2	0	1	0	1	0
	MF	(Italy) ITA	Monza	3	0	0+1	0	1	0	1	0
	FW	(Italy) ITA	Sorce	3	0	0+1	0	1	0	1	0
	GK	(Italy) ITA	Ferrari	1	-1	0+1	-1				

- Source: http://calcio-seriea.net/presenze/1992/1035/
