= 1990–91 Parma AC season =

Parma
1990–91 season
- Owner: Calisto Tanzi
- President: Giorgio Pedraneschi
- Manager: Nevio Scala
- Stadium: Ennio Tardini
- Serie A: 6th
- Coppa Italia: Second round
- Top goalscorer: League: Alessandro Melli (13); All: Alessandro Melli (13)
- Average home league attendance: 18,005
Home colours	Away colours

The 1990–91 season was Parma Associazione Calcio's 78th in Italian football and their first ever season in the Serie A. It was Nevio Scala's second year at the club, as Parma achieved promotion the previous season, by finishing in fourth place. In their first season, they finished in sixth place, before securing a UEFA Cup spot. In the Coppa Italia, they were eliminated 2–0 on aggregate by Fiorentina in the second round, after two legs. Alberto Di Chiara, who went on to join the club the same season, and Stefano Borgonovo scored the goals.

== Squad ==
Note: Flags indicate national team as defined under FIFA eligibility rules; some limited exceptions apply. Players may hold more than one non-FIFA nationality.

Pos.	Nation	Player
GK	BRA	Cláudio Taffarel
GK	ITA	Marco Ferrari
DF	ITA	Enzo Gambaro
DF	ITA	Luigi Apolloni
DF	ITA	Lorenzo Minotti
DF	BEL	Georges Grün
DF	ITA	Cornelio Donati
DF	ITA	Stefano Rossini
DF	ITA	Giovanni Bia
DF	ITA	Gianpaolo Morabito
DF	ITA	Antonio Sconziano
DF	ITA	Sebastiano Siviglia

Pos.	Nation	Player
MF	ITA	Daniele Zoratto
MF	ITA	Stefano Cuoghi
MF	ITA	Aldo Monza
MF	ITA	Tarcisio Catanese
MF	SWE	Tomas Brolin
MF	ITA	Marco Osio
MF	ITA	Rocco De Marco
FW	ITA	Alessandro Melli
FW	ITA	Giovanni Sorce
FW	ITA	Graziano Mannari
FW	ITA	Mario Lemme

=== Transfers ===
In
Pos.	Name	from	Type
MF	Tomas Brolin	IFK Norrköping	
GK	Cláudio Taffarel	SC Internacional	
DF	Georges Grün	RSC Anderlecht	
MF	Stefano Rossini	Fiorentina	
DF	Giovanni Bia	Perugia	
MF	Stefano Cuoghi	Pisa	
FW	Graziano Mannari	Como	
MF	Giovanni Sorce	Licata	

Out
Pos.	Name	To	Type
GK	Luca Bucci	Casertana	
GK	Giacomo Zunico	Lecce	
DF	Giovanni Bia	Trento	loan
DF	Alessandro Orlando	Udinese	
DF	Luca Somella	Avellino	
DF	Massimo Susic	Udinese	
MF	Carlo Bocchialini	Casertana	
MF	Vincenzo Esposito	Avellino	
MF	Marco Giandebiaggi	Cremonese	
FW	Maurizio Ganz	Brescia	
FW	Marcello Melli		

== Competitions ==
=== Serie A ===
==== League table ====
Pos	Team	Pld	W	D	L	GF	GA	GD	Pts	Qualification or relegation
4	Genoa	34	14	12	8	51	36	+15	40	Qualification to UEFA Cup
5	Torino	34	12	14	8	40	29	+11	38	Qualification to UEFA Cup
6	Parma (Note: Parma qualified for the 1991–92 UEFA Cup as a substitute for the banned Milan.)	34	13	12	9	35	31	+4	38	Qualification to UEFA Cup
7	Juventus	34	13	11	10	45	32	+13	37	
8	Napoli	34	11	15	8	37	37	0	37	

Source: 1990–91 Serie A, RSSSF.com
Rules for classification: 1) Points; 2) Head-to-head points; 3) Head-to-head goal difference; 4) Goal difference; 5) Goals scored; 6) Draw.

==== Results by round ====
Round	1	2	3	4	5	6	7	8	9	10	11	12	13	14	15	16	17	18	19	20	21	22	23	24	25	26	27	28	29	30	31	32	33	34
Ground	A	H	A	H	A	H	A	H	A	H	A	H	A	H	A	H	A	H	A	H	A	H	A	H	A	H	A	H	H	A	H	A	H	A
Result	L	D	W	D	D	W	W	L	W	W	L	D	W	D	D	W	W	L	D	L	W	L	W	D	D	L	L	W	W	D	D	L	W	D
Position	12	12	8	7	6	5	4	6	5	4	5	5	4	5	5	4	2	5	5	5	5	5	5	4	5	6	6	5	4	4	4	6	5	6

Source: Competitive matches
A = Away; H = Home; W = Win; D = Draw; L = Loss; = 1991–92 European Cup; = 1991–92 UEFA Cup; = 1991-92 Serie B

==== Matches ====
9 September 1990 1	Parma	1–2	Juventus	Parma
	Melli 88' (pen.)	Report	Napoli N. 24'; Baggio 62' (pen.)	Stadium: Ennio Tardini

16 September 1990 2	Lazio	0–0	Parma	Rome
		Report		Stadium: Olimpico

23 September 1990 3	Parma	1–0	Napoli	Parma
	Osio 64'	Report		Stadium: Ennio Tardini; Referee: Angelo Amendiola

30 September 1990 4	Bari	2–2	Parma	Bari
	Joao Paulo 39'; Dicara 73'	Report	Brolin 59'; Minotti 84'	Stadium: della Vittoria

7 October 1990 5	Parma	0–0	Sampdoria	Parma
		Report		Stadium: Ennio Tardini

21 October 1990 6	Fiorentina	2–3	Parma	Florence
	Kubik 42' (pen.); Buso 73'	Report	Melli 17'; Melli 20'; Brolin 38'	Stadium: Comunale; Referee: Giovanni Merlino

28 October 1990 7	Parma	2–1	Roma	Parma
	Brolin 33'; Sebastiano Nela 45' (o.g.)	Report	Giannini 38'	Stadium: Ennio Tardini; Referee: Alfredo Trentalange

11 November 1990 8	Internazionale	2–1	Parma	Milan
	Serena 35'; Matthäus 37' (pen.)	Report	Melli 89'	Stadium: Giuseppe Meazza; Referee: Pierluigi Pairetto

18 November 1990 9	Pisa	0–2	Parma	Pisa
		Report	Melli 24'; Osio 75'	Stadium: Arena Garibaldi; Referee: Roberto Boggi

25 November 1990 10	Parma	2–0	Cagliari	Parma
	Osio 50'; Grun 90'	Report		Stadium: Ennio Tardini; Referee: Bruno Di Cola

2 December 1990 11	Genoa	2–1	Parma	Genoa
	Carlos Aguilera 20' (pen.); Branco 38'	Report	Melli 46'	Stadium: Luigi Ferraris; Referee: Marcello Cardona

9 December 1990 12	Parma	1–1	Bologna	Parma
	Melli 13'	Report	Turkyilmaz 88'	Stadium: Ennio Tardini

16 December 1990 13	Parma	1–0	Atalanta	Parma
	Melli 24'	Report		Stadium: Ennio Tardini

30 December 1990 14	Torino	0–0	Parma	Turin
		Report		Stadium: Comunale

6 January 1991 15	Parma	0–0	Lecce	Parma
		Report		Stadium: Ennio Tardini

13 January 1991 16	Cesena	0–1	Parma	Cesena
		Report	Brolin 45'	Stadium: Dino Manuzzi

20 January 1991 17	Parma	2–0	Milan	Parma
	Melli 6'; Melli 34'	Report		Stadium: Ennio Tardini

27 January 1991 18	Juventus	5–0	Parma	Turin
	Júlio César 24'; Casiraghi 57'; Marocchi 73'; Baggio 85'; Baggio 87'			Stadium: delle Alpi

3 February 1991 19	Parma	0–0	Lazio	Parma
		Report		Stadium: Ennio Tardini

10 February 1991 20	Napoli	4–2	Parma	Naples
	Maradona 25' (pen.); Maradona 69' (pen.); De Napoli 38'; Careca 72'	Report	Minotti 52'; Osio 81'	Stadium: San Paolo

17 February 1991 21	Parma	1–0	Bari	Parma
	Brambati 46' (o.g.)	Report		Stadium: Ennio Tardini

24 February 1991 22	Sampdoria	1–0	Parma	Genoa
	Mancini 90'	Report		Stadium: Luigi Ferraris Stadium; Attendance: 31 714; Referee: Magni

3 March 1991 23	Parma	1–0	Fiorentina	Parma
	Minotti 13'	Report		Stadium: Ennio Tardini

10 March 1991 24	Roma	1–1	Parma	Rome
	Di Mauro 35'	Report	Brolin 30'	Stadium: Stadio Olimpico; Referee: Tullio Lanese

17 March 1991 25	Parma	0–0	Internazionale	Parma
		Report		Stadium: Ennio Tardini

24 March 1991 26	Parma	2–3	Pisa	Parma
	Brolin 73'; Melli 87' (pen.)	Report	Padovano 32'; Neri 59'; Padovano 61'	Stadium: Ennio Tardini

30 March 1991 27	Cagliari	2–1	Parma	Cagliari
	Fonseca 20'; Herrera 90'	Report	Osio 58'	Stadium: Sant'Elia

7 April 1991 28	Parma	2–1	Genoa	Parma
	Melli 33'; Sorce 64'	Report	Ferroni 35'	Stadium: Ennio Tardini

14 April 1991 29	Bologna	1–3	Parma	Bologna
	Turkyilmaz 37'	Report	Melli 33'; Grun 82'; Minotti 90' (pen.)	Stadium: Renato Dall'Ara

21 April 1991 30	Atalanta	0–0	Parma	Bergamo
		Report		Stadium: Comunale

5 May 1991 31	Parma	0–0	Torino	Parma
		Report		Stadium: Ennio Tardini

12 May 1991 32	Lecce	1–0	Parma	Lecce
	Benedetti P. 59'	Report		Stadium: Via del Mare

19 May 1991 33	Parma	2–0	Cesena	Parma
	Osio 16'; Brolin 74'	Report		Stadium: Ennio Tardini

26 May 1991 34	Milan	0–0	Parma	Milan
		Report		Stadium: San Siro

=== Coppa Italia ===
==== Second round ====
5 September 1990	Fiorentina	1–0	Parma	Florence
	Di Chiara 60'			Stadium: Artemio Franchi

12 September 1990	Parma	0–1	Fiorentina	Parma
			Borgonovo 22'	Stadium: Ennio Tardini

== Statistics ==
=== Players statistics ===
No.	Pos	Nat	Player	Total		Serie A	
No.	Pos	Nat	Player	Apps	Goals	Apps	Goals
	GK	(Brazil) BRA	Cláudio Taffarel	34	-30	34	-30
	DF	(Italy) ITA	Cornelio Donati	25	0	25	0
	DF	(Italy) ITA	Lorenzo Minotti	33	4	33	4
	DF	(Belgium) BEL	Georges Grün	33	2	33	2
	DF	(Italy) ITA	Luigi Apolloni	32	0	32	0
	DF	(Italy) ITA	Enzo Gambaro	34	0	34	0
	MF	(Italy) ITA	Daniele Zoratto	32	0	32	0
	MF	(Italy) ITA	Stefano Cuoghi	29	0	29	0
	MF	(Sweden) SWE	Tomas Brolin	33	7	33	7
	MF	(Italy) ITA	Marco Osio	30	6	30	6
	FW	(Italy) ITA	Alessandro Melli	29	13	29	13
	GK	(Italy) ITA	Marco Ferrari	1	-1	0+1	-1
	MF	(Italy) ITA	Tarcisio Catanese	20	0	11+9	0
	DF	(Italy) ITA	Stefano Rossini	7	0	5+2	0
	MF	(Italy) ITA	Aldo Monza	17	0	6+11	0
	MF	(Italy) ITA	Rocco De Marco	8	0	4+4	0
	FW	(Italy) ITA	Giovanni Sorce	23	1	3+20	1
	FW	(Italy) ITA	Graziano Mannari	12	0	1+11	0
	DF	(Italy) ITA	Giovanni Bia				
	DF	(Italy) ITA	Gianpaolo Morabito				

- Source: http://calcio-seriea.net/presenze/1990/1008/
