= 1992 Supercoppa Italiana =

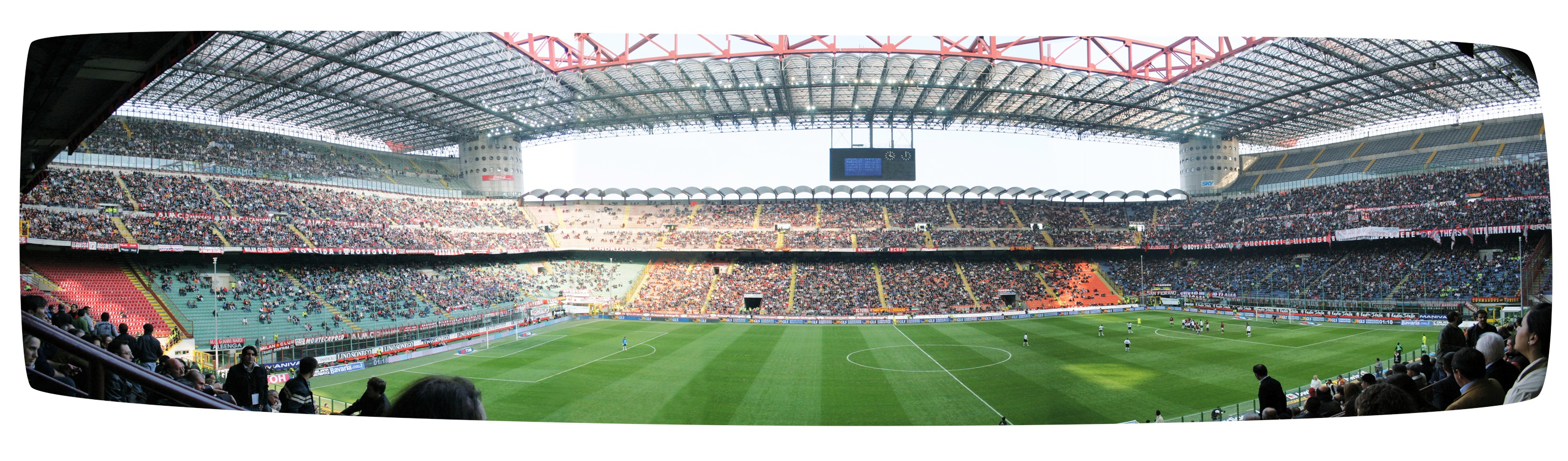
- Event: Supercoppa Italiana
AC Milan	Parma
Serie A	Coppa Italia
2	1
- Date: 30 August 1992
- Venue: San Siro, Milan, Italy
- Referee: Pierluigi Pairetto
- Attendance: 30,102

The 1992 Supercoppa Italiana was a match played by the 1991–92 Serie A winners AC Milan and 1991–92 Coppa Italia winners Parma. It took place on 30 August 1992 at the San Siro in Milan, Italy. AC Milan won the match 2–1 to earn their second Supercoppa.

== Match details ==
30 August 1992

AC Milan	2–1	Parma
Van Basten 14'; Massaro 70'	Report	Melli 45'

San Siro, Milan, Italy
Attendance: 30,102
Referee: Pierluigi Pairetto

AC Milan	Parma

MILAN:
GK	1	(Italy) Francesco Antonioli
RB	2	(Italy) Mauro Tassotti
CB	5	(Italy) Alessandro Costacurta
CB	6	(Italy) Franco Baresi (c)
LB	3	(Italy) Paolo Maldini
RM	8	(Italy) Roberto Donadoni
CM	4	(Italy) Demetrio Albertini
LM	7	(Italy) Gianluigi Lentini
RF	10	(Netherlands) Ruud Gullit	(substituted off) 46'
CF	9	(Netherlands) Marco van Basten
LF	11	(France) Jean-Pierre Papin	(substituted off) 65'
Substitutes:
GK		unknown
LM	14	(Italy) Alberico Evani	(substituted in) 46'
RF	16	(Italy) Daniele Massaro	(substituted in) 65'
		unknown
		unknown
Manager:
(Italy) Fabio Capello

PARMA:
GK	1	(Brazil) Cláudio Taffarel
RB	2	(Italy) Antonio Benarrivo
CB	4	(Italy) Lorenzo Minotti (c)
CB	5	(Italy) Luigi Apolloni
LB	3	(Italy) Alberto Di Chiara
RM	6	(Italy) Salvatore Matrecano
CM	7	(Italy) Daniele Zoratto
CM	8	(Italy) Marco Osio
LM	10	(Italy) Gabriele Pin	(substituted off) 70'
CF	9	(Italy) Alessandro Melli
CF	11	(Colombia) Faustino Asprilla
Substitutes:
GK		unknown
MF	14	(Italy) Stefano Cuoghi	(substituted in) 70'
		unknown
		unknown
		unknown
Manager:
(Italy) Nevio Scala

MATCH OFFICIALS

- Assistant referees:
- Fourth official:

MATCH RULES

- 90 minutes.
- 30 minutes of extra-time if necessary.
- Penalty shoot-out if scores still level.
- Five named substitutes
- Maximum of 2 substitutions.

== See also ==
- 1992–93 AC Milan season
- 1992–93 Parma AC season
