= 1994 European Cup Winners' Cup final =

1994 European Cup Winners' Cup Final
- Match programme cover
- Event: 1993–94 European Cup Winners' Cup
Arsenal	Parma
(England)	(Italy)
1	0
- Date: 4 May 1994
- Venue: Parken Stadium, Copenhagen
- Referee: Václav Krondl (Czech Republic)
- Attendance: 33,765

The 1994 European Cup Winners' Cup final was a football match on 4 May 1994 contested between Arsenal of England and title holders Parma of Italy. It was the final match of the 1993–94 European Cup Winners' Cup and the 34th European Cup Winners' Cup final. The final was held at the Parken Stadium in Copenhagen, and Arsenal won 1–0 with the goal coming from Alan Smith. It is widely considered as the peak of Arsenal's famous defence. Arsenal became the fourth London club to win the trophy after Tottenham Hotspur, Chelsea and West Ham United.

== Background ==
Having beaten Antwerp in the same competition in the previous year, Parma were aiming to become the first side to win consecutive finals; five sides had previously failed to do so after reaching the final for a consecutive year. The final was the first time that Parma had come up against English opposition. On the other hand, Arsenal had three times played out two-legged affairs with Italian clubs. The first meeting was in the 1970–71 Inter-Cities Fairs Cup, when they overcame Lazio 4–2 on aggregate, drawing the first leg in Rome and winning the second leg 2–0 at Highbury. Arsenal had also faced Italians in the 1979–80 European Cup Winners' Cup at the semi-final stage; Arsenal won 2–1 on aggregate. The most recent meeting was in the quarter-finals of this year's competition, where they overcame Torino 1–0 over two legs.

It was the first time Parken Stadium had hosted the major European competition's final and the first time any European competition's final had been held in Denmark. The stadium had opened only recently – in 1992 – and was the home of Copenhagen and the Denmark national team, taking two years to construct at the cost of 640 million Danish kroner. It was built on the site of the national team's previous home, Idrætsparken.

== Route to the final ==
(England) Arsenal					(Italy) Parma			
Opponent	Agg.	1st leg	2nd leg		Opponent	Agg.	1st leg	2nd leg
(Denmark) Odense	3–2	2–1 (A)	1–1 (H)	First round	(Sweden) Degerfors	4–1	2–1 (A)	2–0 (H)
(Belgium) Standard Liège	10–0	3–0 (H)	7–0 (A)	Second round	(Israel) Maccabi Haifa	1–1 (3–1 p)	1–0 (A)	0–1 (a.e.t.) (H)
(Italy) Torino	1–0	0–0 (A)	1–0 (H)	Quarter-finals	(Netherlands) Ajax	2–0	0–0 (A)	2–0 (H)
(France) Paris Saint-Germain	2–1	1–1 (A)	1–0 (H)	Semi-finals	(Portugal) Benfica	2–2 (a)	1–2 (A)	1–0 (H)

== Match ==
=== Summary ===
A crowd of 33,765 witnessed a tactical match. Parma's Tomas Brolin hit the post early on but, in the 20th minute, Lorenzo Minotti miss-hit an overhead clearance and Alan Smith capitalized, beating Luca Bucci with a left-footed volley. Arsenal then invited pressure from Parma but, by controlling Gianfranco Zola and Faustino Asprilla, defended their lead and became the fourth London club to win the trophy. The final was noted for Arsenal fans singing "one nil to the Arsenal" throughout the match.

Arsenal were without their leading goalscorer Ian Wright, who missed the final through suspension as well as the injured John Jensen, Martin Keown, and David Hillier. Arsenal were fielding a starting midfield of Ian Selley, Steve Morrow and Paul Davis. The famous back five of Seaman, Dixon, Adams, Bould and Winterburn was safely in place but with Wright suspended, Alan Smith was given a lone role up front with Merson and Kevin Campbell instructed to play wide in a 4-5-1.

=== Details ===
4 May 1994
20:15 CEST

Arsenal (England)	1–0	(Italy) Parma
Smith 20'	Report

Parken Stadium, Copenhagen
Attendance: 33,765
Referee: Václav Krondl (Czech Republic)

Arsenal	Parma

GK	1	(England) David Seaman
RB	2	(England) Lee Dixon
CB	6	(England) Tony Adams (c)	(yellow card) 25'
CB	5	(England) Steve Bould
LB	3	(England) Nigel Winterburn
RM	8	(Northern Ireland) Steve Morrow
CM	4	(England) Paul Davis
CM	11	(England) Ian Selley	(yellow card) 51'
LM	7	(England) Kevin Campbell	(yellow card) 78'
AM	10	(England) Paul Merson		(substituted off) 86'
CF	9	(England) Alan Smith
Substitutes:
DF	12	(England) Andy Linighan
GK	13	(England) Alan Miller
MF	14	(Republic of Ireland) Eddie McGoldrick		(substituted on) 86'
MF	15	(England) Ray Parlour
FW	16	(Scotland) Paul Dickov
Manager:
(Scotland) George Graham

GK	1	(Italy) Luca Bucci
SW	4	(Italy) Lorenzo Minotti (c)
CB	6	(Argentina) Roberto Sensini
CB	5	(Italy) Luigi Apolloni
RWB	2	(Italy) Antonio Benarrivo
LWB	3	(Italy) Alberto Di Chiara
CM	8	(Italy) Gabriele Pin		(substituted off) 71'
CM	9	(Italy) Massimo Crippa	(yellow card) 44'
AM	10	(Italy) Gianfranco Zola
CF	7	(Sweden) Tomas Brolin
CF	11	(Colombia) Faustino Asprilla	(yellow card) 45'
Substitutes:
GK	12	(Italy) Marco Ballotta
DF	13	(Italy) Roberto Maltagliati
DF	14	(Italy) David Balleri
MF	15	(Italy) Daniele Zoratto
FW	16	(Italy) Alessandro Melli		(substituted on) 71'
Manager:
(Italy) Nevio Scala

Assistant referees:
Josef Zvonic (Czech Republic)
Otakar Draštík (Czech Republic)
Fourth official:
Lubomír Puček (Czech Republic)

Match rules

- 90 minutes.
- 30 minutes of golden goal extra time if necessary.
- Penalty shoot-out if scores still level.
- Five named substitutes.
- Maximum of two substitutions.

== See also ==
- 1993–94 European Cup Winners' Cup
- 1994 UEFA Champions League Final
- 1994 UEFA Cup Final
- 1994 European Super Cup
- Arsenal F.C. in European football
- Parma Calcio 1913 in European football
