= 1993 European Super Cup =

Parma	AC Milan
(Italy)	(Italy)
2	1
- on aggregate

First leg
Parma	AC Milan
0	1
- Date: 12 January 1994
- Venue: Stadio Ennio Tardini, Parma, Italy
- Referee: Manuel Díaz Vega (Spain)
- Attendance: 8,083

Second leg
AC Milan	Parma
0	2
- After extra time
- Date: 2 February 1994
- Venue: San Siro, Milan, Italy
- Referee: Kurt Röthlisberger (Switzerland)
- Attendance: 24,074

The 1993 European Super Cup was contested between AC Milan (the 1992–93 UEFA Champions League runners-up) and Parma (the 1992–93 European Cup Winners' Cup champions). It was won by Parma, 2–1 on aggregate. The final was contested over two legs with a leg at each of the sides' home grounds. The first leg took place at Ennio Tardini, Parma, on 12 January 1994 and ended 0–1. The second leg took place at San Siro, Milan, on 2 February 1994, where Parma won 2–0 after extra time.

== Background ==
While it was Parma's first appearance in the competition, AC Milan were making their fourth appearance, having previously contested the 1973, 1989 and 1990 editions. Parma reached the Super Cup as winners of the 1992–93 European Cup Winners' Cup, having beaten Royal Antwerp 3–1 in the final at Wembley Stadium, London, while Milan lost 1–0 to Marseille in the 1993 UEFA Champions League final at the Olympiastadion, Munich, but Marseille's subsequent ban from European football due to match-fixing meant Milan competed in the Super Cup in their place.

Milan and Parma had never played against each other in European competition, but had previously played seven leagues matches against each other, all within four years of both legs of this tie – Milan had won three matches to Parma's two, with the remaining two matches ending in draws. It was Parma's first match in Europe against a fellow Italian side, but Milan had once previously come up against opposition of the same nationality in Europe when they defeated Sampdoria over two legs (3–1) in the 1990 Super Cup.

== Matches ==
=== First leg ===
12 January 1994
20:30

Parma (Italy)	0–1	(Italy) AC Milan
	Report	Papin 43'

Stadio Ennio Tardini, Parma
Attendance: 8,083
Referee: Manuel Díaz Vega (Spain)

Parma	Milan

GK	1	(Italy) Marco Ballotta
RB	2	(Italy) David Balleri
LB	3	(Italy) Antonio Benarrivo	(substituted off) 77'
CB	4	(Italy) Lorenzo Minotti (c)
CB	5	(Italy) Luigi Apolloni
CM	6	(Argentina) Roberto Sensini
CF	7	(Sweden) Tomas Brolin
CM	8	(Italy) Gabriele Pin
CM	9	(Italy) Massimo Crippa
CF	10	(Italy) Gianfranco Zola
CF	11	(Colombia) Faustino Asprilla
Substitutes:
GK	12	(Italy) Luca Bucci
DF	13	(Italy) Salvatore Matrecano
DF	14	(Italy) Roberto Maltagliati
DF	15	(Italy) Alberto Di Chiara	(substituted on) 77'
MF	16	(Italy) Daniele Zoratto
Manager:
(Italy) Nevio Scala

GK	1	(Italy) Sebastiano Rossi
RB	2	(Italy) Mauro Tassotti
LB	3	(Italy) Paolo Maldini
CM	4	(Italy) Demetrio Albertini	(substituted off) 70'
CB	5	(Italy) Alessandro Costacurta
CB	6	(Italy) Franco Baresi (c)
CM	7	(Italy) Stefano Eranio
CM	8	(France) Marcel Desailly
CF	9	(France) Jean-Pierre Papin
LM	10	(Federal Republic of Yugoslavia) Dejan Savićević	(substituted off) 87'
RM	11	(Italy) Roberto Donadoni
Substitutes:
GK	12	(Italy) Mario Ielpo
DF	13	(Italy) Christian Panucci	(substituted on) 87'
DF	14	(Italy) Filippo Galli
MF	15	(Italy) Angelo Carbone
FW	16	(Italy) Daniele Massaro	(substituted on) 70'
Manager:
(Italy) Fabio Capello

=== Second leg ===
2 February 1994
20:30

AC Milan (Italy)	0–2 (a.e.t.)	(Italy) Parma
	Report	Sensini 23'; Crippa 95'

San Siro, Milan
Attendance: 24,074
Referee: Kurt Röthlisberger (Switzerland)

Milan	Parma

GK	1	(Italy) Sebastiano Rossi
RB	2	(Italy) Christian Panucci
LB	3	(Italy) Paolo Maldini
CM	4	(Italy) Demetrio Albertini	(substituted off) 64'
CB	5	(Italy) Alessandro Costacurta
CB	6	(Italy) Franco Baresi (c)
LM	7	(Denmark) Brian Laudrup	(substituted off) 76'
CM	8	(France) Marcel Desailly
CF	9	(France) Jean-Pierre Papin
RM	10	(Italy) Roberto Donadoni
CF	11	(Italy) Daniele Massaro
Substitutes:
GK	12	(Italy) Mario Ielpo
DF	13	(Italy) Mauro Tassotti
DF	14	(Italy) Filippo Galli
FW	15	(Italy) Gianluigi Lentini	(substituted on) 64'
MF	16	(Italy) Angelo Carbone	(substituted on) 76'
Manager:
(Italy) Fabio Capello

GK	1	(Italy) Marco Ballotta
RB	2	(Italy) Antonio Benarrivo
LB	3	(Italy) Alberto Di Chiara
CB	4	(Italy) Lorenzo Minotti (c)
CB	5	(Italy) Salvatore Matrecano
CM	6	(Argentina) Roberto Sensini
CF	7	(Sweden) Tomas Brolin
CM	8	(Italy) Gabriele Pin
CM	9	(Italy) Massimo Crippa
CF	10	(Italy) Gianfranco Zola	(substituted off) 104'
CF	11	(Colombia) Faustino Asprilla
Substitutes:
GK	12	(Italy) Luca Bucci
DF	13	(Italy) Roberto Maltagliati
DF	14	(Italy) David Balleri
MF	15	(Italy) Daniele Zoratto	(substituted on) 104'
FW	16	(Italy) Alessandro Melli
Manager:
(Italy) Nevio Scala

== See also ==
- AC Milan in international football
- Italian football clubs in international competitions
- Parma Calcio 1913 in European football
- 1993–94 UEFA Champions League
- 1993–94 European Cup Winners' Cup
- 1993–94 AC Milan season
- 1993–94 Parma AC season
