= Tomas Brolin =

Swedish footballer (born 1969)

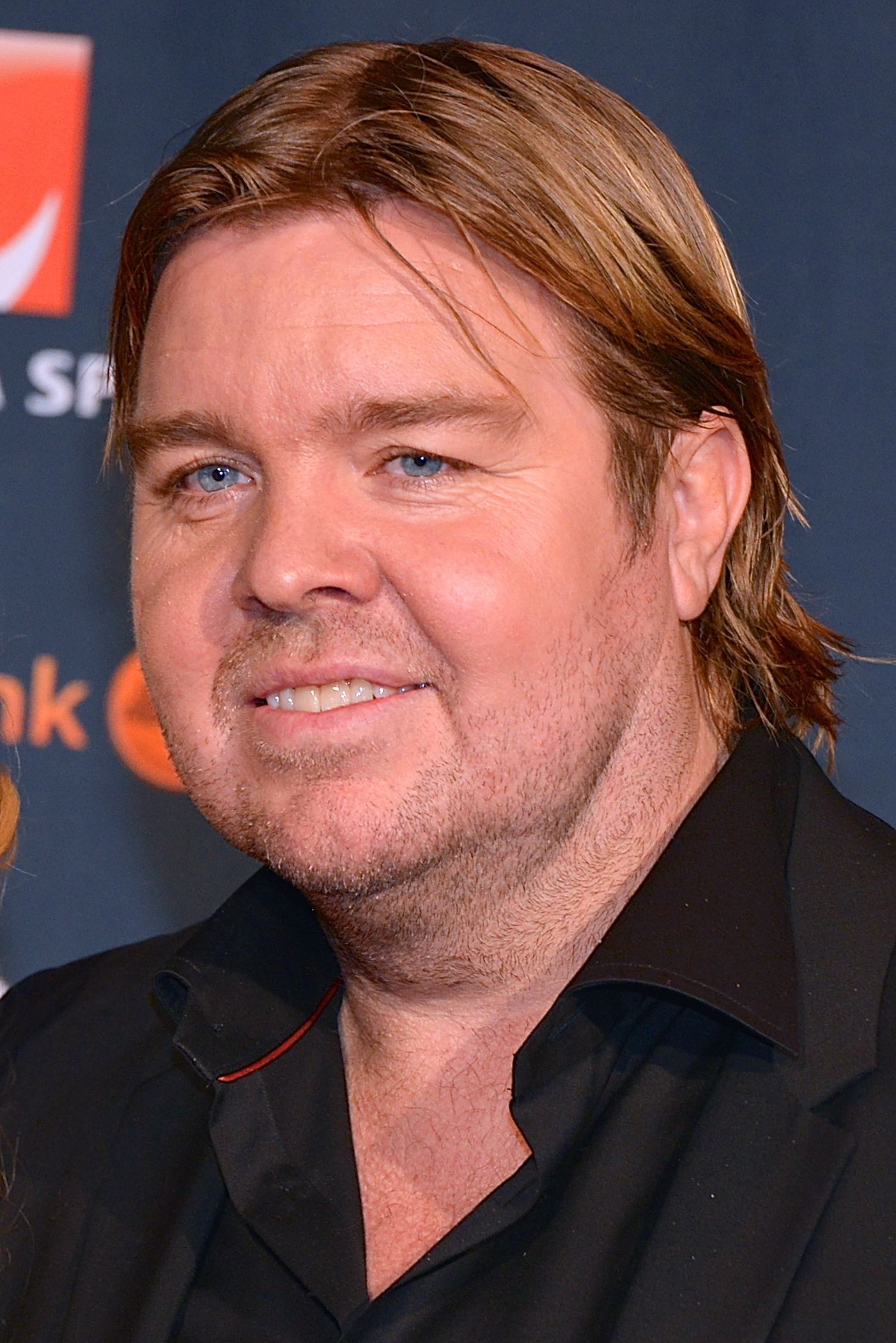
- Brolin at the Swedish Sports Awards in 2013

Personal information
- Full name: Per Tomas Brolin
- Date of birth: 29 November 1969 (age 56)
- Place of birth: Hudiksvall, Sweden
- Height: 1.78 m (5 ft 10 in)
- Positions: Midfielder; forward

Youth career
- 1976–1983: Näsvikens IK

Senior career*
Years	Team	Apps	(Gls)
1984–1986	Näsvikens IK	36	(10)
1987–1989	GIF Sundsvall	55	(13)
1990	IFK Norrköping	9	(7)
1990–1995	Parma	133	(20)
1995–1997	Leeds United	19	(4)
1996	→ FC Zürich (loan)	3	(0)
1997	→ Parma (loan)	11	(0)
1998	Crystal Palace	13	(0)
1998	Hudiksvalls ABK	1	(0)
Total		280	(54)

International career
1986–1987	Sweden U18	9	(3)
1988–1992	Sweden U21/Olympic	16	(6)
1990–1995	Sweden	47	(27)
Medal record
Sweden
FIFA World Cup
Bronze medal – third place	1994
- * Club domestic league appearances and goals

Per Tomas Brolin (Swedish: [ˈtʊ̌mːas brʊˈliːn]; born 29 November 1969) is a Swedish former professional footballer who played as a forward and midfielder.

At the club level, he had a successful period with Parma during the early 1990s, winning the 1992 Coppa Italia, the 1993 Cup Winners' Cup, the 1993 UEFA Super Cup, and the 1995 UEFA Cup. He also represented Näsvikens IK, GIF Sundsvall, IFK Norrköping, Leeds United, FC Zürich, Crystal Palace and Hudiksvall ABK during a career that spanned 14 years between 1984 and 1998.

A full international between 1990 and 1995, Brolin won 47 caps and scored 27 goals for the Sweden national team and helped them finish third at the 1994 FIFA World Cup. He was also a member of the Sweden squads that competed at the 1990 FIFA World Cup, UEFA Euro 1992, and 1992 Summer Olympics. He was the 1990 and 1994 recipient of Guldbollen as Sweden's best footballer of those years.

13 days before his 25th birthday in November 1994, he broke a bone in his foot leading to five months out of first team football. After returning from that injury he was unable to deliver the height of performance he had pre-injury. After struggles with form, injury, and weight he retired from football at the age of 28.

== Club career ==
=== Early career ===
Brolin's first league match in an adult league competition was for Näsvikens IK in 1984 at the age of 14 against Kilafors, and he went on to make 36 appearances for the fourth division club. GIF Sundsvall, spotted Brolin and offered him a contract in which he could continue his education while developing his career. In 1986 Brolin enrolled at Fotbollsgymnasiet, the football academy in Sundsvall. He was subsequently signed by GIF Sundsvall, making his first team debut in 1987 against IF Elfsborg.

After three seasons at Sundsvall, Brolin moved to IFK Norrköping where he scored 7 goals in 9 games during the 1990 Allsvenskan spring season.

=== Parma ===
Brolin was signed by Italian club Parma in 1990, just after the club had been promoted back to Serie A. He quickly formed an effective partnership at Parma with Alessandro Melli. The two together scored 20 goals, 13 from Melli and 7 from Brolin. Parma finished in joint fifth-place in their first season back in Serie A. It was the first time that the team qualified for Europe in their history.

In the 1991–92 season, Brolin played in all 34 of Parma's Serie A matches, scoring four goals. Parma finished in sixth place and lifted the Coppa Italia. Brolin scored two vital goals in the Coppa Italia run: one in a 1–1 draw with Fiorentina, and the second in the 1–0 victory over Sampdoria in the semi-final. Parma beat Juventus 2–1 on aggregate in the final to lift their first trophy in the club's history.

In the 1992–93 season, after Parma won that season's European Cup Winners' Cup, the club purchased the Colombian Faustino Asprilla and the Argentine Sergio Berti. The addition of the two foreign players, however, meant the positions of Parma's three other non-Italian players – Cláudio Taffarel, Georges Grün and Brolin – were not guaranteed, as the club could only field three stranieri, or foreign players, in a match. Before Asprilla's arrival, Brolin had been playing up-front with fellow forward Alessandro Melli. Parma's coach Nevio Scala, however, benched Brolin in favour of Asprilla for most of the season. When Asprilla played, Brolin's number 11 was handed to Asprilla with Brolin playing either in the number 8 or 9 jersey. Brolin did help the club lift the European Cup Winners' Cup by defeating Royal Antwerp 3–1 in the final at Wembley Stadium.

The following season, the club signed duo Gianfranco Zola and Massimo Crippa for a total of £9 million from cash-strapped Napoli, putting Brolin's place in the team even more in the balance. Coach Scala, having seen the benefit of playing Brolin in midfield during the previous season, decided to play Brolin in a deeper position than his first three seasons at the club. He was handed Melli's number 7 jersey and played in a three-man midfield with Gabriele Pin on the right, Crippa on the left and Asprilla and Zola leading the attack. When the team was a goal down or in need of extra firepower up front, striker Melli came on as a substitute in place of Pin and Zola dropped into midfield, a tactic that was deployed by the coach during the 1993–94 season.

The club reached the final of the 1993–94 European Cup Winners' Cup, having beaten Ajax and Benfica on the road to Copenhagen, where they played English side Arsenal. Despite Brolin coming close to scoring in the first 15 minutes and even hitting the post, Parma lost 1–0.

==== Injury ====
On 16 November 1994 at the Råsunda Stadium in Stockholm, Brolin had broken his foot in a qualifier for UEFA Euro 1996. At the time of his injury, Parma were two points clear at the top of the 1994–95 Serie A league table. By the time he returned on 23 April 1995, however, Parma were eight points behind leaders and eventual champions Juventus. With Gianfranco Zola missing, Brolin was given his first full start after his injury on 7 May 1995, a week after he resumed playing for Sweden. His first start in nearly six months came against Genoa, and Parma needed a victory to keep the pressure on runaway leaders Juventus. Brolin lasted 62 minutes before he was substituted for Stefano Fiore as Parma drew 0–0 and slipped seven points behind in the title race. Brolin struggled the rest of the season to find his form and fitness, but nonetheless continued to make appearances. On the last matchday of the season, against Napoli, Brolin was sent off for the first time in his career in the 23rd minute.

==== Departure ====
During the close season, Parma signed Hristo Stoichkov for £6.5 million from Barcelona as Brolin tried to get back to full fitness for the start of the 1995–96 season. Despite scoring in the Parmalat Cup against the United States (2–1) and Boca Juniors (3–1), and participating in a friendly against Anderlecht (1–0) during the club's pre-season, the coach felt that Brolin lacked the appropriate level of fitness to continue playing in the central midfield position.

Brolin made his first league appearance during the 1995–96 season as a late substitute in a 2–1 home win against Inter Milan on 10 September. Four days later, in the first round of the European Cup Winners' Cup, Brolin made his first start against Teuta Durrë in Tirana, as well as made another start in the return match on 28 September. After a few more appearances, it was clear that Brolin would not have a chance to play regularly due to his lack of form. After five years at the club, Brolin decided he would leave Parma in search of more playing time.

=== Leeds United ===
Brolin turned down three Italian clubs before moving to Leeds United on 7 November 1995. On 17 November, he signed a two-and-a-half-year contract. Manager Howard Wilkinson saw Brolin as the perfect foil for the club's top scorer Tony Yeboah.

A day after signing for the club, Brolin made his Premier League debut at St James' Park against Newcastle United as an 82nd-minute substitute for Mark Ford. They lost 2–1. Four days later, Brolin made his first start for the club as he contributed in the 2–1 win over Blackburn Rovers in the League Cup. Fans quickly dubbed Brolin as the "Baby-Faced Assassin".

Brolin scored his first goal for the club against Sheffield Wednesday on 16 December, in a match which they lost 6–2. It was a quite lucky goal, as a Sheffield Wednesday defender trying a clearance hit him in shoulder after he fell on the ground and let him score a goal. He continued, briefly, as a regular starter playing in a 2–0 win over Bolton Wanderers on 27 December, in which he scored his second goal for the club. On 13 January, Brolin hit two goals as ten-man Leeds, without Yeboah and Brian Deane, beat West Ham United 2–0 at Elland Road.

In the aftermath of a 5–0 defeat to Liverpool on 20 January, Brolin and Wilkinson clashed over the player's defensive abilities, with Wilkinson accusing Brolin of not pulling his weight. He played in a 2–1 defeat to Nottingham Forest on 31 January, but was dropped for the league match against Aston Villa despite Wilkinson missing nine first-team players through suspensions, injuries and international duty. Brolin was then listed as "injured" and missed the following three matches. He returned to the team as Leeds beat Birmingham City 3–0 on 25 February in the second leg of the League Cup semi-final to set up a final against Aston Villa.

On 1 April 1996, Brolin had to apologize to Wilkinson after an April Fool's Day prank backfired. He had told Swedish television that he was going to play out the season on loan to former club IFK Norrköping as a joke but the statement was then picked up by international media and re-reported as fact. He returned on 3 April, however, and played in the matches against Southampton, Arsenal and Nottingham Forest. He played his last match of the season at Stamford Bridge on 14 April, setting up Gary McAllister's goal in the 4–1 defeat to Chelsea, but was dropped for the following match against Manchester United. On 1 May, it was announced by the club that Brolin had returned home to Sweden to undergo surgery to remove scar tissue from his troublesome ankle, and was not fit for Leeds' last two league matches. Brolin's future at Leeds, however, was already in doubt.

In 2012, Brolin claimed in Swedish magazine Offside that his poor performance in the game against Liverpool that led to his being dropped had been a protest against Wilkinson playing him out of position on the wing, leaving him "to run up and down the right like an idiot" as opposed to the centrally lying playmaker role he believed that he had been signed for.

==== Loan to Zürich ====
In the middle of 1996, Brolin went searching for a club and was granted three extra days by Wilkinson to find a new club; however, no serious interest was forthcoming. On 19 August 1996, Leeds announced that Brolin was on the transfer market and were prepared to sell him for nearly £2 million less than the £4.5 million paid for him just a year earlier. Leeds manager Wilkinson had fined Brolin a week's wages around £12,000 for not turning up to pre-season training and announced he was seeking guidance from the Professional Footballers' Association on the legality of withholding Brolin's wages, and told the press that he would rather have any player in his team than Brolin. Leeds stopped his wages when he refused to show up for pre-season training and reportedly saved £72,000 by the time Brolin had joined FC Zürich on loan, where he received the minimum wage of £800-a-week for a player in the Natonalliga A.

Brolin joined the Swiss club on 20 August 1996 and played three matches for Zürich in the Nationalliga A and one Swiss Cup match against lowly Uzwil, which Zürich won 10–0. Brolin wanted to stay at the club until their mid-season winter break in December to get back to full fitness, but Leeds' new coach George Graham wanted him back at Elland Road and refused to allow him to play for the club against St. Gallen on 9 October, after his loan spell ended on 30 September. Graham was quoted as saying, "We have heard nothing from Tomas Brolin. We have not even got a telephone number for him. All our correspondence with him has been done through his agent, Lars Peterson." Leeds gave Brolin an ultimatum to return to the club on 6 November or face legal action.

==== Loan to Parma ====
A proposed loan move to Sampdoria collapsed on 13 November after a medical due to a metal staple in his foot. This scuppered a move back to Italy, with a view to a permanent £2 million move to the club.

Leeds urged Brolin to return to Yorkshire and have tests on his damaged ankle to clarify the extent of the injury, fearing Brolin would be forced to retire, and wanted him to seek a second opinion from a leading orthopedic surgeon. Then, on 24 December, Brolin paid £500,000 of his own money to fund his loan move back to Parma until the end of the season. Brolin trained with the club but did not return to first team action until 23 February 1997 as a second-half substitute in a 2–0 win over Lazio. He also made substitute appearances against Cagliari (3–2), Perugia (2–1), Inter (1–0) and Fiorentina (0–1), all in March 1997.

Brolin played in an exhibition match at the Olympic Stadium in Montjuïc, Barcelona, on 26 April for the International Association of Professional Footballers (AIFP), of which he was a founding member. Brolin played against Udinese (0–2) on 28 April as a substitute, and with Parma having several injuries and suspensions, Parma head coach Carlo Ancelotti handed Brolin his first and only start in his second spell at the Italian club on 4 May in a 2–1 win over Atalanta. He then made another appearance in the 3–0 win over Vicenza a week later. Brolin even played a part in Parma's title run-in with Juventus, making substitute appearances against Milan (1–1), and against Juventus (1–1) on 25 May, coming on after Hernán Crespo limped off with a hamstring injury. His last appearance came in the last game of the season, on 1 June, in a 2–1 win over Hellas Verona, as Parma finished in their best ever position, second place.

By the end of the season, it was clear that Parma were not interested in keeping the player and had only agreed to sign him on loan to keep him fit after so many years of loyal service to the Parma club.

==== Departure ====
On 16 June 1997, Brolin's loan deal with Parma expired. Under the terms of the agreement, he was obligated to return to Elland Road within 72 hours. Brolin, however, was axed by coach George Graham for the club's pre-season tour of Sweden. Brolin was forced to find another club on loan or play for the reserves.

On 29 August, he was offered a loan deal with Real Zaragoza but the deal fell through and Brolin missed the Spanish transfer deadline. As a result, he was fined by Leeds for being absent for training for three days which he disputed. Then, on 15 September, Brolin met with Jim Jefferies about a loan to Hearts. Yet again, however, the deal fell through. According to Brolin's agent, the club would not meet their price, but the Hearts chief Chris Robinson decided to pull the plug on the deal due to the player's lack of fitness.

After the two failed loan deals, Brolin continued to train and play in the reserves. On 6 October, he was fined £90,000 after missing a match to attend his father's 50th birthday as well as criticizing Graham in the media. The player threatened to take the club to a Premier League tribunal. On 28 October 1997, club officials, Brolin, and Brolin's representatives decided to terminate Brolin's contract for a reported £140,000.

Although he recovered from his ankle injury, Brolin never regained his pre-injury level of fitness. He made 19 Premier League appearances for Leeds United, scoring four goals. He is widely regarded by Leeds fans as one of the club's worst ever players, and in 2003, a poll by BBC Sport saw him voted by the club's fans as the club's worst player in living memory, with the editor joking that Brolin had given almost all of his £4.5 million fee back to the local catering industry with "dedicated munching". In 2007 he was voted the second worst player in England's top division since 1970.

=== Crystal Palace ===
On 16 November 1997, Steve Coppell, the manager of struggling Crystal Palace, offered Brolin a two-week trial. Palace had been playing a friendly in Sweden, and Coppell was hoping to finalize the two-week trial while he was there. At the time, Brolin was training with Hammarby IF in Stockholm.

The trial began on 5 January 1998. With a player shortage, Brolin was asked by Coppell to play for the club in a league match. Brolin was registered as a player for the club and allocated the number 12 jersey. He played in the home league match against Everton on 10 January, and netted a ball in the 72nd minute only to see the referee rule it out for offside. The club lost 3–1 but Brolin, whose trial ended on 16 January, was handed a contract until the end of the season.

In his third game, Brolin came up against his old club Leeds United. Brolin was still overweight, but managed to get a starting place in the team. After five minutes, however, he had to come off after a collision with Bruno Ribeiro, which left him dazed and needing stitches to a head wound. While he was receiving treatment, Leeds scored. Brolin, determined to upset his former team, returned to the field six minutes later, but Palace were unable to beat Leeds.

Brolin went on to play 12 more times for Palace, mostly as a striker due to the London club's shortage of players up-front. On 13 March 1998, the club lost to Chelsea 6–2. Crystal Palace had been procured by Mark Goldberg who decided Steve Coppell should step down as manager and player Attilio Lombardo would take over as player-manager. Despite it being widely reported that Brolin was to be his assistant coach, Palace chairman Goldberg insisted that the fluent Italian and English speaking Brolin was merely Lombardo's interpreter.

Brolin's last competitive game came in the 3–0 defeat to Manchester United on 27 April 1998. He was substituted for Jamie Fullarton after 68 minutes. Brolin was unable to recapture his form or fitness failing to score in 15 appearances. Palace were relegated from the Premier League and on 14 May 1998, he was released from the London club and returned to Sweden to think about his prospects.

=== Retirement ===
On 12 August 1998, Brolin announced his retirement from the game and made his last appearance on 29 August 1998 in the last 15 minutes for Hudiksvalls A.B.K. against Kiruna FF, as a goalkeeper.

== International career ==
=== Early career and 1990 World Cup ===
At the age of 20, and having played in the Allsvenskan for GIF Sundsvall for three years, Brolin moved to IFK Norrköping and in his first game for the club in a pre-season friendly against IFK Eskilstuna, he netted a hat-trick. However, it was his hat-trick in his league debut in a 6–0 victory over IFK Göteborg at Idrottsparken in Norrköping that grabbed all the headlines and alerted Sweden's coach Olle Nordin to Brolin's talents. Sweden had just qualified for the FIFA World Cup for the first time since 1978 and were looking for a forward to lead their frontline, having only managed nine goals in six matches during the qualifying rounds.

Eighteen days later, 25 April, Brolin was lining up against Wales at the Råsunda Stadion, and five minutes after Dean Saunders had given the visitors the lead, Brolin announced his arrival on the international stage with two goals in six minutes to give Sweden a 2–1 lead. Sweden won 4–2 on the night, and Brolin went on to score another two in the following match with Finland a month later, which Sweden won 6–0. Subsequently, Brolin was picked to lead the Swedish attack in the 1990 World Cup in Italy. Sweden failed to win any of their matches at that tournament, however, but after scoring against Brazil, Brolin was soon signed by Parma for £1.2 million (out of a possible 12 buyers), and also won his first Guldbollen as Sweden's footballer of the year.

=== Euro 1992 ===
At UEFA Euro 1992, Brolin was joint top-scorer (three goals) with three others (Henrik Larsen, Dennis Bergkamp and Karl-Heinz Riedle); his goal against England did much to raise his profile.

=== 1994 World Cup ===
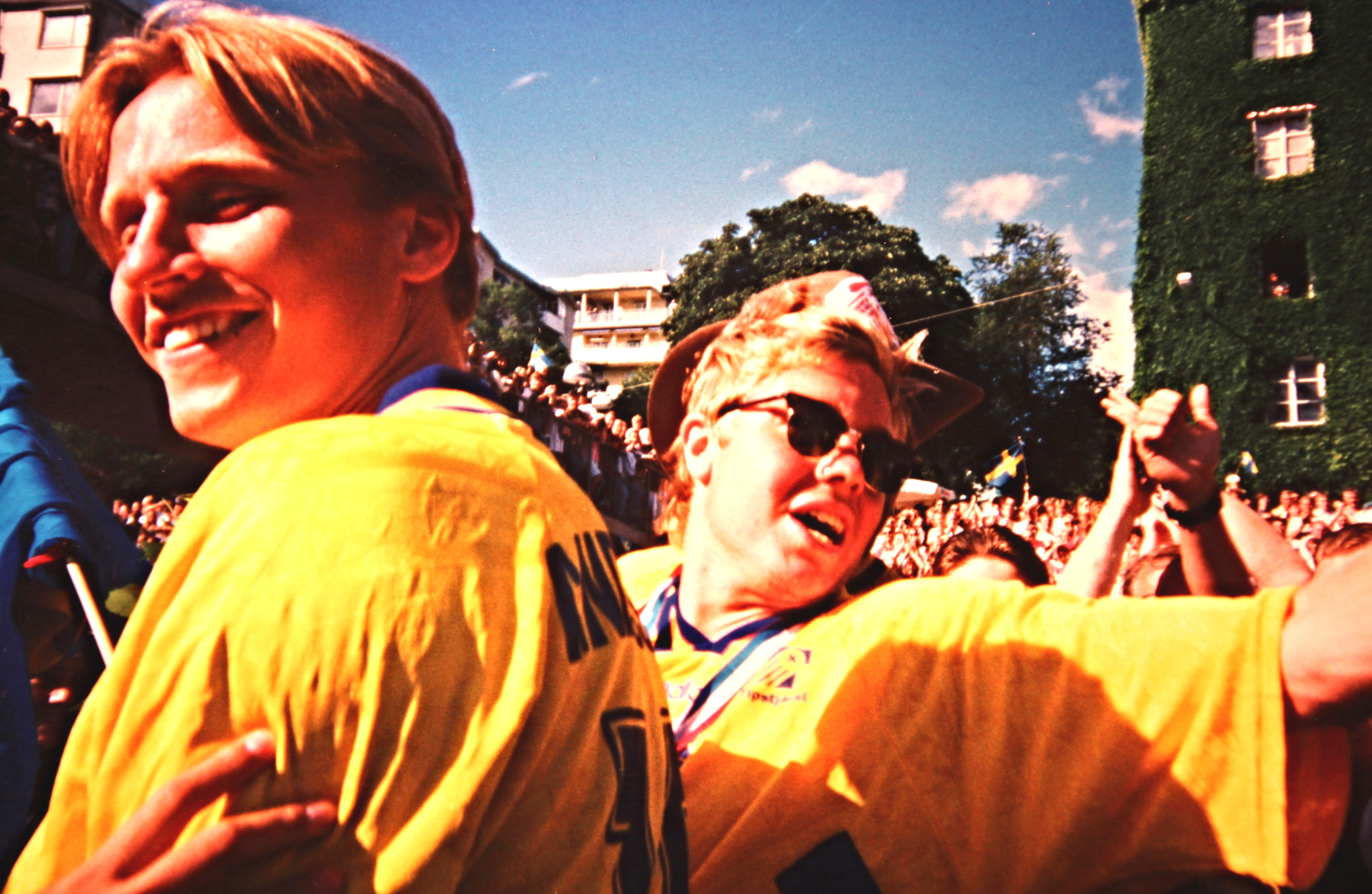
Brolin and Kennet Andersson after the 1994 FIFA World Cup

Brolin went to the 1994 World Cup in the best shape of his career, at the age of 24. Despite having a talented group of players, however, Sweden was not predicted by bookies to go far at the World Cup in the United States. They scraped a draw with Cameroon in their opening game. Things improved in Sweden's next game with Russia, with Brolin playing behind Martin Dahlin and the towering Kennet Andersson, as Sweden won 3–1.

In their final group match, Sweden drew 1–1 with tournament favourites Brazil after Brolin set up Sweden's goal for Kennet Andersson, and reached the second round.

Brolin scored three goals for Sweden in the 1994 World Cup as the nation finished third in the competition. Brolin's performances earned him a place in the competition's World Cup All Star Team. In the quarter-final against Romania, he scored one of his most famous goals: When Sweden were awarded a free-kick, everyone expected Stefan Schwarz to shoot. Instead, Schwarz jumped over the ball and Håkan Mild passed the ball past the wall to Brolin, who managed to score. He received his second Guldbollen award in 1994.

=== Euro 1996 qualifying ===
On 16 November 1994, at the Råsunda Stadion in Stockholm, Brolin broke his foot in a qualifier for Euro 1996. On 7 May 1995, a week after he had returned from injury, Brolin played for Sweden against Iceland, and scored a penalty but was unable to help his team to a much needed victory in their qualifying campaign.

On 16 April 1996, Brolin was then dropped by Swedish coach Tommy Svensson for a friendly against Northern Ireland in Belfast, and was quoted, "Brolin is not at 100 percent at the moment and it is difficult to say when he will be." Brolin told Swedish news agency TT that it was the best for him, and the national side: "Right now I need to recover in order to get to the capacity needed to add something to the national team."

In the end, Sweden did not qualify for Euro 1996. Brolin never played for his country again, but in the last five years he had been selected 47 times at senior level and scored an impressive 27 goals.

== Style of play ==
A dynamic, energetic, creative and technically gifted footballer, Brolin was a world-class player in his prime, who was known for his excellent dribbling skills, as well as for his passing ability and powerful shots on goal. A versatile player, he was usually deployed as an offensive-midfield playmaker due to his ability to provide assists for teammates, but he was also used as a striker, winger, central midfielder and as a deep-lying forward throughout his career, due to his work-rate and tactical intelligence. Despite his talent in his youth, his career was affected by several injuries, which forced him into early retirement.

== Personal life ==
After retiring from football, Brolin settled to become a businessman and returned to his homeland where for a period of time he owned an Italian-Swedish restaurant called Undici (Italian: 11, the number he wore while playing for Parma). Undici has been fined numerous times for permitting underage drinking. Brolin also invested money in real estate and – to some public amusement – in a firm selling a new type of mouthpiece for vacuum cleaners. He also appeared in a video by Dr. Alban which featured other famous Swedish sportsmen, including Björn Borg.

In 2001, his long-time girlfriend, Susan Hardenborg, gave birth to Brolin's first child, a boy named Sebastian. The couple had split before the birth of the child, but remain on good terms. After meeting the former Miss Sweden and TV presenter Annika Duckmark in late 2000, they got married, and stayed together until they got divorced in 2006.

Brolin has been an active World Series of Poker player since 2006. Playing in the 2007 World Series of Poker and the 2006 Football & Poker Legends Cup organized by PartyPoker.com. He has also competed regularly in the PokerStars.com European Poker Tour and cashed twice – once in the Season 4 Prague event where he came 23rd and again in the EPT Grand Final later that season in Monte Carlo where he came 38th out of an 842-strong field.

Brolin took part in the first episode of Masked Singer Sverige 2024 on TV4, appearing as the character "Snögubben" (the Snowman). He became the first contestant to be eliminated after the panel and audience voted him off. Speaking to Aftonbladet, Brolin, then 54, said he did not consider his early exit a defeat because he had no ambition to win the competition and was happy to take the loss "for the team." He also said he had declined the invitation several times before eventually agreeing to participate.

== Career statistics ==
=== Club ===
Appearances and goals by club, season and competition
Club	Season	League			Cup		Europe		Total	
Club	Season	Division	Apps	Goals	Apps	Goals	Apps	Goals	Apps	Goals
Näsvikens IK	1984	Division 4 Hälsingland			—		—			
Näsvikens IK	1985	Division 4 Hälsingland			—		—			
Näsvikens IK	1986	Division 4 Hälsingland			—		—			
Näsvikens IK	Total		36	10	—		—		36	10
GIF Sundsvall	1987	Allsvenskan	13	3			—		13	3
GIF Sundsvall	1988	Allsvenskan	21	6			—		21	6
GIF Sundsvall	1989	Allsvenskan	21	4			—		21	4
GIF Sundsvall	Total		55	13			—		55	13
IFK Norrköping	1990	Allsvenskan	9	7			—		9	7
Parma	1990–91	Serie A	33	7	1	0	—		34	7
Parma	1991–92	Serie A	34	4	8	2	1	0	43	6
Parma	1992–93	Serie A	22	4	2	2	3	0	27	6
Parma	1993–94	Serie A	29	5	7	4	5	1	41	10
Parma	1994–95	Serie A	11	0	1	0	4	0	16	0
Parma	1995–96	Serie A	4	0	1	0	3	0	7	0
Parma	Total		133	20	20	8	16	1	168	29
Leeds United	1995–96	Premier League	19	4	6	0	—		25	4
FC Zürich (loan)	1996–97	Nationalliga A	3	0	—		—		3	0
Parma (loan)	1996–97	Serie A	11	0	—		—		11	0
Crystal Palace	1997–98	Premier League	13	0	3	0	—		16	0
Hudiksvall ABK	1998	Division 2 Norrland	1	0	—		—		1	0
Career total			280	54	29	8	16	1	325	63

=== International ===
Appearances and goals by national team and year
National team	Year	Apps	Goals
Sweden	1990	7	5
Sweden	1991	7	5
Sweden	1992	7	3
Sweden	1993	6	3
Sweden	1994	15	9
Sweden	1995	5	2
Total		47	27

Scores and results list Sweden's goal tally first, score column indicates score after each Brolin goal.

List of international goals scored by Tomas Brolin
No.	Date	Venue	Opponent	Score	Result	Competition
1	25 April 1990	Råsunda, Stockholm, Sweden	Wales	1–0	4–2	Friendly
2	25 April 1990	Råsunda, Stockholm, Sweden	Wales	2–0	4–2	Friendly
3	27 May 1990	Råsunda, Stockholm, Sweden	Finland	3–0	6–0	Friendly
4	27 May 1990	Råsunda, Stockholm, Sweden	Finland	4–0	6–0	Friendly
5	10 June 1990	Stadio delle Alpi, Turin, Italy	Brazil	1–2	1–2	1990 FIFA World Cup
6	5 June 1991	Råsunda, Stockholm, Sweden	Colombia	1–0	2–2	Friendly
7	5 June 1991	Ullevi, Gothenburg, Sweden	Soviet Union	1–0	2–3	Scania 100 Tournament
8	5 June 1991	Ullevi, Gothenburg, Sweden	Soviet Union	2–2	2–3	Scania 100 Tournament
9	15 June 1991	Idrottsparken, Norrköping, Sweden	Denmark	4–0	4–0	Scania 100 Tournament
10	8 August 1991	Ullevaal Stadion, Oslo, Norway	Norway	1–1	2–1	Friendly
11	14 June 1992	Råsunda, Stockholm, Sweden	Denmark	1–0	1–0	UEFA Euro 1992
12	17 June 1992	Råsunda, Stockholm, Sweden	England	2–1	2–1	UEFA Euro 1992
13	21 June 1992	Råsunda, Stockholm, Sweden	Germany	1–2	2–3	UEFA Euro 1992
14	2 June 1993	Råsunda, Stockholm, Sweden	Israel	1–0	5–0	1994 FIFA World Cup qualification
15	2 June 1993	Råsunda, Stockholm, Sweden	Israel	2–0	5–0	1994 FIFA World Cup qualification
16	2 June 1993	Råsunda, Stockholm, Sweden	Israel	4–0	5–0	1994 FIFA World Cup qualification
17	20 April 1994	Racecourse Ground, Wrexham, Wales	Wales	2–0	2–0	Friendly
18	5 June 1994	Råsunda, Stockholm, Sweden	Norway	1–0	2–0	Friendly
19	5 June 1994	Råsunda, Stockholm, Sweden	Norway	2–0	2–0	Friendly
20	24 June 1994	Pontiac Silverdome, Pontiac, United States	Russia	1–1	3–1	1994 FIFA World Cup
21	10 July 1994	Stanford Stadium, Palo Alto, United States	Romania	1–0	2–2	1994 FIFA World Cup
22	16 July 1994	Rose Bowl, Pasadena, United States	Bulgaria	1–0	4–0	1994 FIFA World Cup
23	17 August 1994	Eyravallen, Örebro, Sweden	Lithuania	1–0	4–2	Friendly
24	17 August 1994	Eyravallen, Örebro, Sweden	Lithuania	2–0	4–2	Friendly
25	16 November 1994	Råsunda, Stockholm, Sweden	Hungary	1–0	2–0	UEFA Euro 1996 qualifying
26	1 June 1995	Råsunda, Stockholm, Sweden	Iceland	1–1	1–1	UEFA Euro 1996 qualifying
27	16 August 1995	Idrottsparken, Norrköping, Sweden	United States	1–0	1–0	Friendly

== Honours ==
Parma

- UEFA Cup Winners' Cup: 1992–93
- UEFA Cup: 1994–95
- UEFA Super Cup: 1993
- Coppa Italia: 1991–92

Leeds United

- Football League Cup runner-up: 1995–96

Sweden

- FIFA World Cup third place: 1994

Individual

- Guldbollen: 1990, 1994
- UEFA Euro Golden Boot: 1992
- FIFA World Cup All-Star Team: 1994
- Ballon d'Or fourth place: 1994
- Stor Grabb: 1992
