= Marco Ferrari =

Italian footballer

Personal information
- Date of birth: 21 August 1966 (age 60)
- Place of birth: Rimini, Italy
- Height: 1.78 m (5 ft 10 in)
- Position: Goalkeeper

Senior career*
Years	Team	Apps	(Gls)
1983–1986	Rimini	37	(0)
1986–1994	Parma	79	(0)
1991–1992	→ Avellino (loan)	10	(0)
1994–1995	Forlì	14	(0)
- * Club domestic league appearances and goals

Marco Ferrari (born 21 August 1966 in Rimini) is a retired Italian professional footballer who played as a goalkeeper.

== Honours ==
Parma

- UEFA Cup Winners' Cup winner: 1992–93.
- UEFA Super Cup winner: 1993.
