= Roberto Colacone =

Italian footballer

Personal information
- Full name: Roberto Colacone
- Date of birth: April 26, 1974 (age 52)
- Place of birth: San Donato Milanese, Italy
- Height: 1.80 m (5 ft 11 in)
- Position: Striker

Senior career*
Years	Team	Apps	(Gls)
1993–1994	Parma	1	(0)
1994–1995	Carrarese	28	(9)
1995–1996	SPAL	32	(11)
1996–1997	Foggia	29	(7)
1997–2000	Lucchese	98	(25)
2000	Treviso	1	(0)
2000	Ravenna	4	(0)
2001–2002	Como	40	(9)
2002–2003	Vicenza	8	(0)
2003	Genoa	19	(2)
2004–2005	Ascoli	62	(18)
2005–2007	Modena	75	(7)
2008	AlbinoLeffe	11	(2)
2008	Modena	10	(1)
2008–2010	Ancona	67	(12)
2010–2011	Cremonese	22	(0)
2011–2012	Monza	30	(7)
- * Club domestic league appearances and goals

Roberto Colacone (born 26 April 1974) is an Italian former footballer who played as a forward.

He spent most of his career in Serie B and Serie C1, and only played once in Serie A.

== Career ==
Colacone started his career at Parma. He made his Serie A debut on 9 April 1994, against A.S. Roma. He then played for two Serie C1 clubs and Serie B club Foggia, and joined Lucchese of Serie B in summer 1997. Lucchese relegated to Serie C1 in summer 1999, but gave a chance for Colacone. He scored 14 goals in Serie C1 that season. In summer 2000, he was signed by Treviso of Serie B, but in October left for league rival Ravenna, and in January 2003 for Como (Serie C1).

Colacone followed Como promoted to Serie B in summer 2001, but when Como won promotion to Serie A in summer 2002, he was loaned to Vicenza of Serie B for next season. He then played for Genoa in Serie B, and left for league rival Ascoli for just 6 months. On 30 June 2005, he signed for Modena of Serie B on free transfer, but Ascoli later offered a place in Serie A.

In January 2008, he joined AlbinoLeffe of Serie B.

=== Italian football scandal ===
On 18 June 2012 Colacone was suspended for 4 years due to 2011–12 Italian football scandal.
