= Fausto Pizzi =

Italian footballer and manager

Personal information
- Date of birth: 21 July 1967 (age 59)
- Place of birth: Rho, Italy
- Height: 1.77 m (5 ft 10 in)
- Position: Midfielder

Team information
- Current team: Parma (youth manager)

Senior career*
| Years | Team | Apps | (Gls) |
| 1985–1992 | Internazionale | 39 | (6) |
| 1986–1987 | → Centese (loan) | 27 | (8) |
| 1987–1989 | → L.R. Vicenza (loan) | 64 | (25) |
| 1989–1990 | → Parma (loan) | 37 | (12) |
| 1992–1993 | Parma | 23 | (5) |
| 1993–1995 | Udinese | 69 | (17) |
| 1995–1996 | Napoli | 32 | (3) |
| 1996–1997 | Perugia | 28 | (4) |
| 1997–1998 | Genoa | 18 | (0) |
| 1998–1999 | Cremonese | 34 | (4) |
| 1999–2001 | Treviso | 69 | (13) |
| 2001–2002 | Cittadella | 23 | (3) |
| 2002–2003 | Reggiana | 9 | (1) |
| 2003–2004 | San Marino | 16 | (3) |
| 2004–2005 | Forlì | 34 | (2) |

Managerial career
- 2007–2011: Parma U15
- 2011–: Parma U20
- * Club domestic league appearances and goals

Fausto Pizzi (born 21 July 1967) is an Italian former professional footballer who played as a midfielder. Since 2011, he has managed Parma F.C.'s most senior youth team.

== Playing career ==
Pizzi was born in Rho. He started his career at Inter and spent the first five years of his career on loan, including one spell at Parma. He subsequently struggled to break into Inter's first team on a regular basis and moved to Parma in 1992, where he spent one year. He retired in 2005.

== Managerial career ==
On 21 June 2011, Pizzi became the head coach of Parma's under-20 team, the primavera. He replaced Tiziano De Patre, who had decided to move to another team to pursue a senior coaching post. Pizzi had coached other Parma youth sides after joining the club in 2007.

== Honours ==
Inter

- UEFA Cup: 1990–91

Parma

- UEFA Cup Winners' Cup: 1992–93
