= Faustino Asprilla =

Colombian footballer (born 1969)

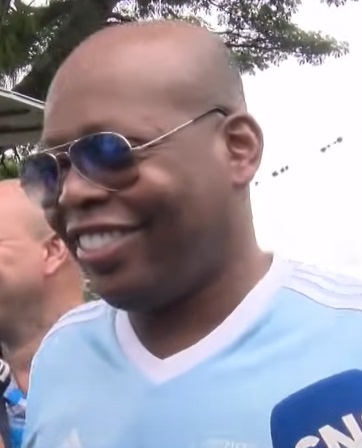
- Asprilla in 2019

Personal information
- Full name: Faustino Hernán Asprilla Hinestroza
- Date of birth: 10 November 1969 (age 57)
- Place of birth: Tuluá, Colombia
- Height: 1.76 m (5 ft 9 in)
- Positions: Forward; attacking midfielder

Youth career
- 1986–1987: Sarmiento Lora

Senior career*
Years	Team	Apps	(Gls)
1988–1989	Cúcuta Deportivo	36	(17)
1989–1992	Atlético Nacional	75	(32)
1992–1996	Parma	84	(25)
1996–1998	Newcastle United	48	(9)
1998–1999	Parma	12	(1)
1999–2000	Palmeiras	12	(2)
2000–2001	Fluminense	12	(8)
2001–2002	Atlante	12	(3)
2002	Atlético Nacional	11	(3)
2003	Universidad de Chile	13	(5)
2003–2004	Estudiantes La Plata	2	(0)
2004	Cortuluá	1	(0)
Total		318	(105)

International career
1993–2001	Colombia	57	(20)
- * Club domestic league appearances and goals

Faustino Hernán Asprilla Hinestroza (born 10 November 1969) is a Colombian former professional footballer who played as forward or winger, most notably for Parma, Newcastle United, and the Colombia national team.

== Club career ==
=== Early years ===
After starting out playing football with local team Carlos Sarmiento Lora School, Asprilla started his professional career in 1988 for the Colombian team Cúcuta Deportivo at the age of 18 for a year before transferring to Atlético Nacional. He scored 35 goals in 78 games, which brought him to the attention of several Italian clubs. Parma won the race to sign him for US$10.9 million in 1992.

=== Parma ===
In his first season at Parma, Asprilla scored some important goals, including a 27-yard second-half free-kick which helped Parma defeat Milan 1–0, ending the Italian champions' unbeaten streak at 58 matches. It was at Parma Asprilla arguably enjoyed his greatest club success. Asprilla was part of the Parma squad which won its first international tournament, the 1992–93 European Cup Winners' Cup, scoring four goals in eight matches. It was his brace in Spain that rallied the Italian team to a 2–1 victory over Atlético Madrid in the semi-final. However, an injury meant he was an unused substitute as Parma defeated Belgian club Royal Antwerp 3–1 in the final.

In early 1994, Asprilla was part of the Parma side that defeated Milan 2–0 at the San Siro to overturn a 1–0 first-leg deficit and claim the 1993 European Super Cup.

Also in the 1993–94 season, Parma reached a second Cup Winners' Cup final. However, a 0–1 defeat to Arsenal meant they would not retain their trophy.

In 1994–95, Parma again reached the final of a major European competition as they faced Italian compatriots Juventus in the final of the UEFA Cup. Asprilla was instrumental in Parma's run to the final, with three goals over two legs in the semi-final against Bayer Leverkusen. In the final itself, Asprilla was in the starting XI for both legs as Parma defeated Juventus 2–1 on aggregate.

At the start of the 1995–96 season, Asprilla found himself out of head coach Nevio Scala's plans. In February 1996, after making only six appearances in the opening five months of the season, Asprilla joined English Premier League leaders Newcastle United for a £6.7 million transfer fee.

During his first spell at Parma, Asprilla scored 25 goals in 84 Serie A appearances. He is considered one of the greatest players of Parma's successful period in the 1990s. In his three full seasons with the club, Parma finished third, fifth and third in Serie A. The club also reached a European final in each of those seasons, as well as the 1994–95 Coppa Italia final. In 1993, he was also ranked by FIFA as the sixth-best player in the world in the FIFA World Player of the Year award.

=== Newcastle United ===
Parma sold Asprilla to English Premier League side Newcastle United for £6.7 million in February 1996, with "Tino", as the fans nicknamed him, appearing at St James' Park to finalise the move during a snowstorm, dressed in a fur coat.

At the time, Newcastle were ahead of Manchester United in the Premier League, although their lead at the top of the table was narrowing. Asprilla's arrival on Tyneside came just months after earlier media reports of a move to England, with Leeds United being linked with his signature.

Asprilla made his league debut in Newcastle's 2–1 win over Middlesbrough at the Riverside Stadium on 10 February 1996, coming on as a second-half substitute with the score 1–0 in Middlesbrough's favour. He made an immediate impact, creating the assist for Newcastle's equaliser. However, his time on Tyneside was blighted by inconsistency and off-field incidents, and outsiders blamed Asprilla as one of the reasons Newcastle went on to concede the 1995–96 Premier League title to eventual winners Manchester United, but manager Kevin Keegan and team-mate Keith Gillespie disagree with that.

Asprilla's second season for Newcastle ended with the club finishing in second place once again, behind Manchester United. His role was largely reduced to substitute appearances, although he retained his best performances for the club's UEFA Cup campaign, scoring five goals. His celebration of the goal he scored against Metz, whereby he removed his shirt and swung it from a corner flag, resulted in Asprilla being given a yellow card, meaning a suspension from Newcastle's next UEFA Cup match against Monaco.

The 1997–98 season was Asprilla's last for Newcastle. With the sale of striker Les Ferdinand to Tottenham Hotspur and a serious injury to Alan Shearer during the pre-season, Asprilla was preferred as first-choice striker alongside the young, inexperienced Jon Dahl Tomasson. Newcastle's second-place league finish the season before meant they qualified for the UEFA Champions League; Asprilla started the first game against Barcelona on 17 September 1997 and scored a hat-trick in a 3–2 win. These would turn out to be his last goals for the club. By the end of January 1998, with Newcastle struggling in the league and eliminated from the Champions League, Asprilla's time at Newcastle came to an end. He was sold back to Parma for £6 million, having scored a total of nine goals in 48 Premier League appearances and nine goals in 11 European matches.

=== Return to Parma ===
In his second spell at Parma, Asprilla won his second UEFA Cup, coming on as a substitute as Parma defeated Marseille in the final.

=== Palmeiras ===
Asprilla played in the successful Palmeiras team in the 1999 and 2000 seasons. He won both the Rio-São Paulo Tournament and the Brazilian Champions Cup in 2000.

=== Later career and Darlington link ===
Although his brief time with Palmeiras saw the team achieve success, for Asprilla personally his time there marked the beginning of a pattern of short, relatively unproductive stays with various clubs across various countries, including Brazil, Mexico, Chile, Colombia and Argentina.

During a time which was generally low-key, he appeared in the public eye again in 2002 amid reports he had been approached by English Division Three side Darlington. Darlington successfully appealed an initial work permit refusal and had offered around £17,000 per week plus 20% of gate receipts, a car and a rent-free flat. Chairman George Reynolds considered they were friends and in fact paraded Asprilla in front of 5,163 fans before Darlington's 2–0 win over Carlisle United on 27 August, believing the intended two-year contract was good as signed. However, it was reported that after Asprilla stalled on taking a medical on 29 August, in the early hours of 30 August he caught a flight from Newcastle Airport to the Middle East, apparently to accept a more lucrative contract offer (the identity of the club was not revealed). Reynolds described himself as "absolutely gutted" by the snub, complaining Asprilla "did not even have the decency to say goodbye" and said he would never talk to him again.

=== Retirement ===
In July 2009, Asprilla officially retired from top flight football following a retirement match in Medellín, Colombia. Although this marks his official retirement date, he had not been actively employed by a professional side in around five years.

== International career ==
=== Summary ===
Asprilla scored 20 goals in 57 matches for Colombia from 1993 to 2001 and played for his country at the 1994 and 1998 FIFA World Cups. Asprilla was expected to be one of the top players of the 1994 tournament, but failed to score a single goal as Colombia was eliminated in the first round.

=== 1992 Summer Olympics ===
Asprilla was a member of the Colombian team at the 1992 Summer Olympics in Barcelona where the team was eliminated in the first round following losses to Spain (4–0) and Egypt (3–4) and a draw with Qatar (1–1).

=== 1993 Copa America ===
In the 1993 Copa América, held in Ecuador, Colombia finished third overall. After topping Group C with a 2–1 win over Mexico and draws with Bolivia (1–1) and Argentina (1–1), Colombia defeated Uruguay 1–1 (5–3 on penalties) before losing 0–0 (6–5 on penalties) to Argentina in the semi-final, the eventual tournament winners. In the match for third place, Colombia defeated hosts Ecuador 1–0 to claim third place. Asprilla did not score in the tournament.

=== 1994 FIFA World Cup ===
Asprilla was part of the Colombian team which demolished Argentina 5–0 in a World Cup Qualifier match in Buenos Aires in 1993, where Asprilla scored twice. Colombia finished undefeated in the South American qualifying group. Entering the 1994 World Cup, there were high expectations for Colombia as a dark horse favourite to win the tournament with a squad that included such notable players as Carlos Valderrama, Freddy Rincón and Asprilla. However, with one win and two losses, Colombia finished at the bottom of their group and was eliminated after the first round. Asprilla himself had a disappointing tournament, failing to score, and left the tournament before the group stage had concluded.

=== 1995 Copa América ===
In the 1995 Copa América, held and won by Uruguay, Colombia again finished third. Colombia started out by finishing third in Group B with a 1–1 draw with Peru (Asprilla scored the goal), a 1–0 win over Ecuador and a 0–3 loss to Brazil. The nation then went on to defeat Paraguay 5–4 on penalties after a 1–1 draw in the quarter-finals before losing to Uruguay 2–0 in the semi-final. In the third place match, Colombia faced the United States, which Colombia easily defeated 4–1 with Asprilla scoring one of the Colombians' four goals in the match.

=== 1998 FIFA World Cup ===
In the 1998 FIFA World Cup, held in France, expectations were again high for Colombia and Asprilla remained in the team. However, again Colombia was eliminated in the first round following one win and two losses. Asprilla was dismissed from the team after complaining to reporters about the head coach's decision to substitute him near the end of Colombia's opening loss against Romania.

In 2001, at age 32, Asprilla retired from international football.

== Personal life ==
In 2008, he was arrested for allegedly firing a machine gun at security forces near his farm in Colombia. He was placed under house arrest on charges of weapons possession and criminal damage. He has appeared in various Colombian Reality Shows, such as Desafio 2005 and Nomadas.

He made a return to St James' Park on 22 January 2011, appearing on the pitch at half time during Newcastle United's Premier League home match against Tottenham Hotspur. He attended a charity dinner in Gateshead that evening, alongside Les Ferdinand and Peter Beardsley.

In early 2013, Asprilla was linked with a return to his former club Newcastle. Asprilla spoke of performing a coaching role with the youth squad as well as developing a special role in introducing young talent into the academy from his homeland Colombia. His intention is to give Colombians a chance to showcase their skills in European/English football, based on the sheer amount of talent that has come from Colombia in recent years.

Asprilla played in former Magpies goalkeeper Steve Harper's testimonial match on 11 September 2013 against A.C. Milan Glorie. He had a header disallowed for offside before the Italians won 2–1 on penalties.

In September 2014, it was revealed Asprilla was preparing to launch a range of flavoured condoms in Colombia. In 2020, he sold the products at a special promotional price in order to ease the strains of the COVID-19 pandemic in his home country.

Asprilla revealed in 2019 that a hitman wanted to murder Paraguay goalkeeper José Luis Chilavert after both players were sent off in Colombia's 2–1 defeat during a 1998 FIFA World Cup qualifier in 1997.

== Style of play ==
Asprilla was capable of playing as a forward, as a striker, as a centre-forward, as a second striker or as an attacking midfielder in the number ten role. Though never a prolific goalscorer, he was a player known for his flair, creativity, technique, power, acceleration and pace, as well as his eye for goal and ability to create chances and score goals with either foot; moreover, he was an accurate free kick taker. Former playing colleague Robbie Elliott described Asprilla's playing style: "There were reasons behind everyone Kevin [Keegan] signed. With Tino it was that unpredictability; he just unlocked teams. His nickname was the octopus because his legs were everywhere and you literally [sic] had no idea what he was going to do."

Despite his talent and unpredictability, he was known for being inconsistent, as well as temperamental and controversial, both on and off the field. He was also known for his somersault then double-fist-pump goal celebration. Due to his long limbs, he was given the nickname il polipo ("the octopus", in Italian), during his time in Serie A, as well as cobra, due to his playing ability.

== Career statistics ==
=== Club ===
Appearances and goals by club, season and competition
Club	Season	League			Cup		Continental		Other		Total	
Club	Season	Division	Apps	Goals	Apps	Goals	Apps	Goals	Apps	Goals	Apps	Goals
Cúcuta Deportivo	1988	Categoría Primera A	36	17	—		—		—		36	17
Atlético Nacional	1989	Categoría Primera A	15	7	1	2	—		—		16	9
Atlético Nacional	1990	Categoría Primera A	20	9	—		2	0	—		22	9
Atlético Nacional	1991	Categoría Primera A	34	12	—		5	0	—		39	12
Atlético Nacional	1992	Categoría Primera A	6	4	—		7	3	—		13	7
Atlético Nacional	Total		75	32	1	2	14	3	0	0	90	37
Parma	1992–93	Serie A	26	7	7	1	6	4	—		39	12
Parma	1993–94	Serie A	27	10	7	4	10	2	—		44	16
Parma	1994–95	Serie A	25	6	8	0	8	4	—		41	10
Parma	1995–96	Serie A	6	2	0	0	0	0	—		6	2
Parma	Total		84	25	22	5	24	10	0	0	130	40
Newcastle United	1995–96	Premier League	14	3	1	0	0	0	0	0	15	3
Newcastle United	1996–97	Premier League	24	4	0	0	6	5	0	0	30	9
Newcastle United	1997–98	Premier League	10	2	1	0	5	4	0	0	16	6
Newcastle United	Total		48	9	2	0	11	9	0	0	61	18
Parma	1997–98	Serie A	4	0	0	0	0	0	—		4	0
Parma	1998–99	Serie A	8	1	3	2	5	0	—		16	3
Parma	Total		12	1	3	2	5	0	0	0	20	3
Palmeiras	1999	Série A	6	2	—		1	0	—		7	2
Palmeiras	2000	Série A	6	0	—		8	1	—		14	1
Palmeiras	Total		12	2	0	0	9	1	0	0	21	3
Fluminense	2000	Série A	2	0	—		—		—		2	0
Fluminense	2001	Série A	10	8	—		—		—		10	8
Fluminense	Total		12	8	0	0	0	0	0	0	12	8
Atlante	2001–02	Liga MX	12	3	—		—		—		12	3
Atlético Nacional	2002	Categoría Primera A	11	3	—			0	—		11	3
Universidad de Chile	2003	Chilean Primera División	13	5	—		—		—		13	5
Estudiantes La Plata	2003–04	Argentine Primera División	2	0	—		—		—		2	0
Cortuluá	2004	Categoría Primera A	1+	0	—		—		—		1	0
Career total			318	105	28	9	0	0	63	23	409	137

=== International ===
Scores and results list Colombia's goal tally first, score column indicates score after each Asprilla goal.

List of international goals scored by Faustino Asprilla
No.	Date	Venue	Opponent	Score	Result	Competition
1	6 June 1993	Estadio Nemesio Camacho, Bogotá, Colombia	Chile	1–0	1–0	Friendly
2	5 September 1993	Estadio Monumental Antonio Vespucio Liberti, Buenos Aires, Argentina	Argentina	2–0	5–0	1994 FIFA World Cup qualification
3	5 September 1993	Estadio Monumental Antonio Vespucio Liberti, Buenos Aires, Argentina	Argentina	4–0	5–0	1994 FIFA World Cup qualification
4	7 July 1995	Estadio Atilio Paiva Olivera, Rivera, Uruguay	Peru	1–0	1–1	1995 Copa América
5	22 July 1995	Estadio Domingo Burgueño, Maldonado, Uruguay	United States	3–0	4–1	1995 Copa América
6	28 March 1996	Estadio Atanasio Girardot, Medellín, Colombia	Bolivia	3–1	4–1	Friendly
7	24 April 1996	Estadio Metropolitano Roberto Meléndez, Barranquilla, Colombia	Paraguay	1–0	1–0	1998 FIFA World Cup qualification
8	29 May 1996	Miami Orange Bowl, Miami, United States	Scotland	1–0	1–0	Friendly
9	7 July 1996	Estadio Metropolitano Roberto Meléndez, Barranquilla, Colombia	Uruguay	1–0	3–1	1998 FIFA World Cup qualification
10	1 September 1996	Estadio Metropolitano Roberto Meléndez, Barranquilla, Colombia	Chile	1–0	4–1	1998 FIFA World Cup qualification
11	1 September 1996	Estadio Metropolitano Roberto Meléndez, Barranquilla, Colombia	Chile	2–0	4–1	1998 FIFA World Cup qualification
12	1 September 1996	Estadio Metropolitano Roberto Meléndez, Barranquilla, Colombia	Chile	4–0	4–1	1998 FIFA World Cup qualification
13	9 October 1996	Estadio Olímpico Atahualpa, Quito, Ecuador	Ecuador	1–0	1–0	1998 FIFA World Cup qualification
14	8 February 1997	Estadio Hernán Ramírez Villegas, Pereira, Colombia	Slovakia	1–0	1–0	Friendly
15	20 August 1997	Estadio Metropolitano Roberto Meléndez, Barranquilla, Colombia	Bolivia	3–0	3–0	1998 FIFA World Cup qualification
16	9 February 1999	Miami Orange Bowl, Miami, United States	Germany	1–0	3–3	Friendly
17	9 February 1999	Miami Orange Bowl, Miami, United States	Germany	2–2	3–3	Friendly
18	17 June 1999	Estadio Palogrande, Manizales, Colombia	Peru	1–3	3–3	Friendly
19	17 June 1999	Estadio Palogrande, Manizales, Colombia	Peru	2–3	3–3	Friendly
20	19 February 2000	Miami Orange Bowl, Miami, United States	United States	1–1	2–2	2000 Gold Cup

== Honours ==
=== Club ===
Atlético Nacional

- Categoría Primera A: 1991
- Copa Interamericana: 1990

Parma

- Coppa Italia: 1998–99
- UEFA Cup: 1994–95, 1998–99
- European Cup Winners' Cup: 1992–93
- European Super Cup: 1993

Palmeiras

- Torneio Rio – São Paulo: 2000
- Copa dos Campeões: 2000
- Copa Mercosur runner-up: 1999
- Intercontinental Cup runner-up: 1999
- Copa Libertadores: runner-up: 2000
