= Alberto Di Chiara =

Italian footballer (born 1964)

Personal information
- Date of birth: 29 March 1964 (age 62)
- Place of birth: Rome, Italy
- Height: 1.78 m (5 ft 10 in)
- Positions: Full back; winger

Youth career
- Roma

Senior career*
| Years | Team | Apps | (Gls) |
| 1980–1982 | Roma | 4 | (0) |
| 1982–1983 | Reggiana | 22 | (1) |
| 1983–1986 | Lecce | 91 | (13) |
| 1986–1991 | Fiorentina | 142 | (10) |
| 1991–1996 | Parma | 142 | (5) |
| 1996–1997 | Perugia | 24 | (0) |
| Total | | 425 | (29) |

International career
| 1985 | Italy U21 | 2 | (0) |
| 1992–1993 | Italy | 7 | (0) |
- * Club domestic league appearances and goals

Alberto Di Chiara (Italian pronunciation: [alˈbɛrto di ˈkjaːra]; born 29 March 1964) is an Italian former professional footballer, who played for Roma, Reggiana, Lecce, Fiorentina, Parma and Perugia, as well as for the Italy national side, as a winger and full back. He is the younger brother of the Italian footballer Stefano Di Chiara.

== Club career ==
A Roma youth product, he made his Serie A debut with the club during the 1980–81 Serie A season, also winning the Coppa Italia that year. After two seasons with the club, he was transferred to Serie B side Reggiana in 1982, making 22 appearances.

In 1983, he was acquired by Lecce for the following season. He helped the club achieve an historic first-time promotion to Serie A during the 1984–85 season, his second year with the club. During the 1985–86 Serie A season, he played alongside his brother Stefano under manager Eugenio Fascetti.

Between 1986 and 1991, he played with Fiorentina, collecting 122 appearances and 10 goals in Serie A over five seasons. Although he was initially acquired as a winger in 1986, the club's new Brazilian manager at the time, Sebastião Lazaroni decided to deploy him as an attacking full-back or wing-back, in the mould of offensive, Brazilian attacking fullbacks, such as Djalma Santos, due to Di Chiara's pace, technical ability, and his offensive style of play. During his time at the club, he reached the 1990 UEFA Cup Final.

In 1991, he joined Parma, where he remained until 1996, during one of the club's most successful periods, playing predominantly in his new full-back role under manager Nevio Scala, also achieving his first call-up to the national side. During his time at the club, he formed a notable partnership with fellow attacking full-back Antonio Benarrivo, and he won the 1991–92 Coppa Italia, the 1992–93 European Cup Winners' Cup, the 1993 UEFA Super Cup, and the 1994–95 UEFA Cup, also achieving runners-up medals in the 1992 Supercoppa Italiana, the 1994 UEFA Cup Winners' Cup Final, and in the 1995 Coppa Italia Final, as well as a third-place finish in Serie A in 1995. After leaving the club in 1996, he ended his career after a season with Perugia, retiring in 1997.

== International career ==
After representing the Italy under-21 side twice in 1985, Di Chiara also represented the Italian senior national side as a fullback on 7 occasions between 1992 and 1993, while playing for Parma. He was the first ever Parma player to be called up for Italy, making his debut on 31 May 1992, in a 0–0 home draw against Portugal, under manager Arrigo Sacchi.

== Style of play ==
Di Chiara was a consistent and offensive-minded left-footed full-back, who was capable of playing anywhere along the left flank; throughout his career, he was also used as a winger (having started out in this position), or as a wing-back in Scala's 3–5–2 formation with Parma. His pace, flair, composure, stamina, technical skills, and attacking instincts enabled him to charge down the wing, beat opponents, and create chances for teammates with accurate crosses.

== Honours ==
Roma

- Coppa Italia: 1980–81

Parma

- Coppa Italia: 1991–92
- UEFA Cup Winners' Cup: 1992–93
- UEFA Super Cup: 1993
- UEFA Cup: 1994–95
