= Nevio Scala =

Italian football player and manager (born 1947)

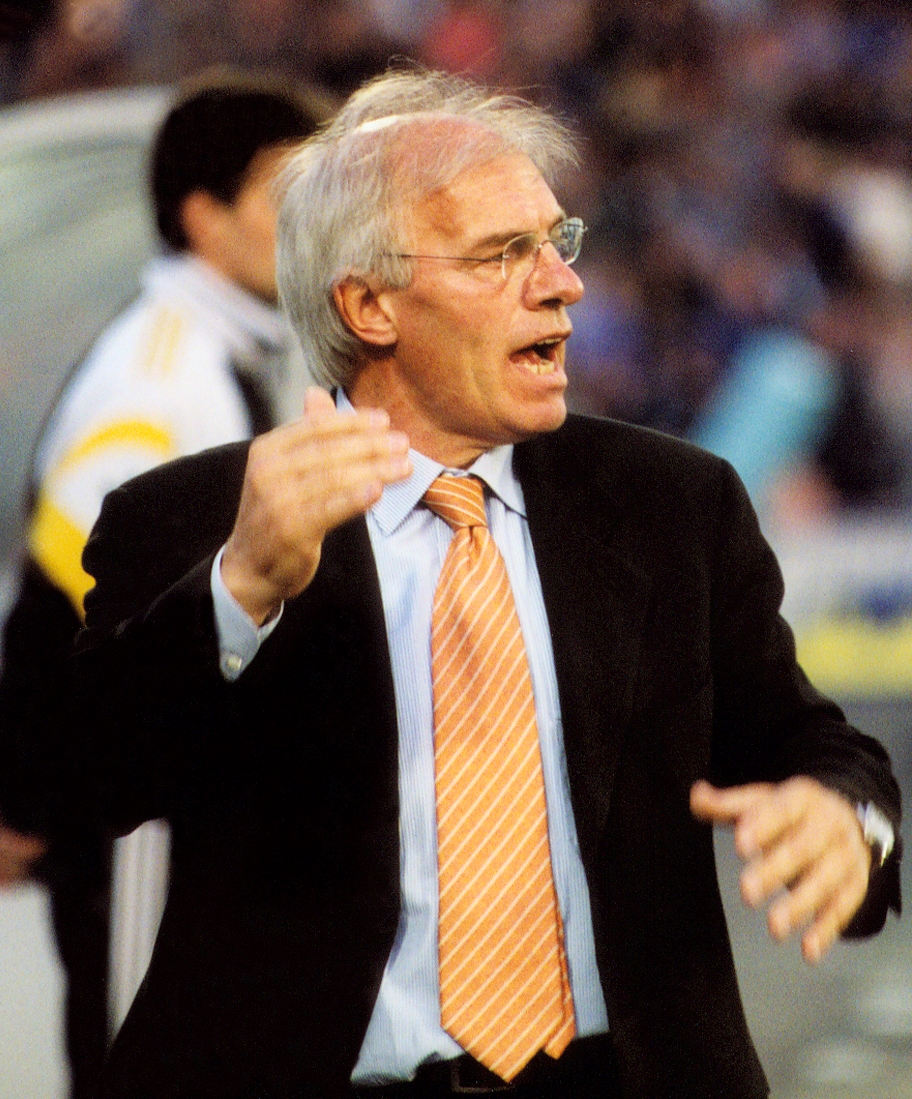
- Scala in 2002

Personal information
- Full name: Nevio Scala
- Date of birth: 22 November 1947 (age 78)
- Place of birth: Lozzo Atestino, Italy
- Position: Midfielder

Youth career
- Milan

Senior career*
Years	Team	Apps	(Gls)
1965–1969	Milan	11	(0)
1966–1967	→ Roma (loan)	28	(1)
1969–1971	Vicenza	59	(2)
1971–1973	Fiorentina	50	(6)
1973–1975	Inter Milan	26	(1)
1975–1976	Milan	23	(0)
1976–1979	Foggia	85	(2)
1979–1980	Monza	14	(0)
1980–1981	Adriese	23	(1)
Total		319	(13)

Managerial career
- 1988–1989: Reggina
- 1989–1996: Parma
- 1997: Perugia
- 1997–1998: Borussia Dortmund
- 2000–2001: Beşiktaş
- 2002: Shakhtar Donetsk
- 2003–2004: Spartak Moscow
- * Club domestic league appearances and goals

Nevio Scala (Italian pronunciation: [ˈnɛvjo ˈskala]; born 22 November 1947) is an Italian football sporting director, coach and former player.

Throughout his footballing career, he played as a midfielder for several Italian clubs, and won several titles during his time with AC Milan. As a manager, he is mostly known for his role as head coach of Parma during the club's golden age of the 1990s, which saw him lead the team from Serie B to several European triumphs.

== Playing career ==
Born in Lozzo Atestino, Province of Padua, Veneto, Scala enjoyed a successful career as a midfielder for several Italian top-flight teams — Roma, Milan, Vicenza and Internazionale acf Fiorentina — and subsequently played for lower-ranked clubs Foggia, Monza and Adriese in the final years of his career.

As a player, with Milan, he won the Serie A in 1967–68, the European Cup Winners' Cup also in 1967–68, and the European Cup in 1968–69.

== Coaching career ==
As a coach, he led Calabrian third division club Reggina to Serie B in 1988, and then moved to Serie B club Parma. He held that position for six years, leading the Emilian club to its first promotion to the Italian top flight in 1990, and subsequently turned the team into one of the major clubs in the Italian Serie A, thanks also to the relevant financial backing from chairman and Parmalat founder Calisto Tanzi, winning several domestic and European titles. During his time at Parma, Scala won the Coppa Italia in 1992, the Cup Winners' Cup and the European Super Cup in 1993, and the UEFA Cup in 1995. He also managed runners-up medals in the Coppa Italia in 1995, in the Cup Winners' Cup in 1994, and twice in the Supercoppa Italiana in 1992 and 1995, while his best result in the league were third-place finishes during the 1992–93 and 1994–95 Serie A seasons. He left Parma in June 1996.

During the 1996–97 season, Scala accepted an offer from Luciano Gaucci to become head coach of struggling Perugia, but did not manage to escape relegation to Serie B for his side, missing out on potential salvation by a single point.

He successively pursued a number of experiences abroad, becoming head coach of German club Borussia Dortmund in 1997, with whom he won the Intercontinental Cup that season; he left the club in 1998. In 2000, he became another Italian coach after Giuseppe Meazza and Sandro Puppo to manage a Turkish team by accepting an offer from Beşiktaş; hs time at the club was not positive, however. He then went on to serve as head coach of Ukraine's FC Shakhtar Donetsk, where he won Ukrainian Championship and Cup in 2002, and Russians Spartak Moscow winning the 2003 Russian Cup, the latter role being his last head coaching experience to date.

He currently lives in his hometown city of Lozzo Atestino, where he is member of the local city council since 2007, after running unsuccessfully as mayor in 2007. He is currently active as a football pundit for Rai Radio 1, where he regularly comments Serie A games and gives his answers to live phone comments and questions on Sunday late night show Domenica sport.

In the early 2010s, Scala expressed a desire to return to coaching, being linked with Motherwell F.C. and later with AS Roma in 2010.

In July 2015, he was confirmed as new chairman of a refounded Parma, after the original club folded due to financial issues, while former player Luigi Apolloni was chosen as head coach. Parma managed to return to the professional Italian leagues that season, and clinched promotion from Serie D into Lega Pro on 17 April 2016. Scala resigned from chairmanship in November 2016, in disagreement with the club owners' decision to sack head coach Luigi Apolloni and technical director Lorenzo Minotti, both former players of his during his days as Parma manager.

== Style of management ==
Scala was a pragmatic manager, who was known for his high-tempo, offensive–minded, possession–based style, which was inspired by Dutch total football; he was also influenced by the calm style of Nils Liedholm and the charisma of Nereo Rocco, under whom he had played. He was also influenced by Helenio Herrera and Giovanni Trapattoni. His tactical approach was in stark contrast to other styles popular in Italy at the time, which were either the gioco all'italiana inspired by the man-to-man marking of catenaccio, or Arrigo Sacchi's zonal 4–4–2. Scala instead used a fluid and innovative 5–3–2 formation, which could easily transform into a 3–5–2 formation when attacking, with the full-backs, such as Antonio Benarrivo and Alberto Di Chiara at Parma, frequently running into spaces to overload the flanks and give his team a numerical advantage. He used this system at almost every club he managed, except Spartak Moscow, where he did not have players suited to this formation and used a 5–2–3 instead. He is credited as being a pioneer of this 3–5–2 or 5–3–2 formation, which later became highly popular in Serie A. At Parma, Scala used a zonal marking system off the ball throughout most areas of the pitch, and a high defensive line, but also used elements of man-to-man marking in defence, with a non systematic use of the offisde trap. He also made use of a ball-playing sweeper – Lorenzo Minotti – flanked by two stoppers: Luigi Apolloni and Georges Grün. He also deployed an intelligent deep-lying playmaker in midfield, such as Daniele Zoratto. Scala also often used a sweeper-keeper, such as Cláudio Taffarel, Luca Bucci, or Gianluigi Buffon, who was adept with his feet, and who was also capable of rushing out of goal quickly to beat opponents who had beaten the offisde trap and clear the ball away from danger. Scala's Parma were known for being hard-working, compact defensively, and capable of scoring from swift counter-attacks. The team often made use of switches of play to stretch their opponents. His style was not only spectacular, but also successful.

Scala also believed in the importance of the psychological aspect of the game, and in discussing issues with his players, as well as creating a united dressing room environment through fun, leadership, and good humour. Known for his ability to develop youth talent, he also felt it was important to give his younger players freedom rather than indoctrinate them through tactical discussions. He also found ways to incorporate several talented players into his team; for example, upon the arrival of Gianfranco Zola at Parma, he successfully moved Swedish footballer Tomas Brolin into midfield, in order to accommodate for the Italian in the role of second striker. Scala's style even served as an inspiration for Zola as a manager.

== Career statistics ==
=== Managerial ===
As of match played 24 August 2024

Managerial record by team and tenure
Team	From	To	Record								Ref.
Team	From	To	M	W	D	L	GF	GA	GD	Win %	Ref.
Reggina	1 July 1988	30 June 1989	44	15	19	10	41	41	+0	34.09	
Parma	1 July 1989	30 June 1996	322	148	95	79	418	283	+135	45.96	
Perugia	8 January 1997	30 June 1997	19	5	5	9	29	36	−7	26.32	
Borussia Dortmund	1 July 1997	30 June 1998	52	21	13	18	89	69	+20	40.38	
Beşiktaş	1 July 2000	6 March 2001	37	21	6	10	73	61	+12	56.76	
Shakhtar Donetsk	19 January 2002	18 September 2002	30	20	6	4	51	25	+26	66.67	
FC Spartak Moscow	10 December 2003	3 September 2004	32	12	6	14	43	47	−4	37.50	
Total			536	242	150	144	744	562	+182	45.15	

== Honours ==
=== Player ===
Milan

- Serie A: 1967–68
- European Cup: 1968–69
- European Cup Winners' Cup: 1967–68

=== Managerial ===
Parma

- Coppa Italia: 1991–92; runner-up 1994–95
- European Cup Winners' Cup: 1992–93; runner-up 1993–94
- European Super Cup: 1993
- UEFA Cup: 1994–95
- Supercoppa Italiana runner-up: 1992, 1995

Borussia Dortmund

- Intercontinental Cup: 1997

Beşiktaş

- Atatürk Cup: 2000

Shakhtar Donetsk

- Ukrainian Premier League: 2001–02
- Ukrainian Cup: 2001–02

Spartak Moscow

- Russian Super Cup runner-up: 2004

== See also ==
- List of UEFA Cup Winners' Cup winning managers
- List of UEFA Cup and Europa League winning managers
