= Alessandro Melli =

Italian footballer (born 1969)

Personal information
- Date of birth: 11 December 1969 (age 56)
- Place of birth: Agrigento, Italy
- Height: 1.78 m (5 ft 10 in)
- Position: Striker

Senior career*
Years	Team	Apps	(Gls)
1985–1994	Parma	199	(52)
1988–1989	→ Modena (loan)	8	(0)
1994–1995	Sampdoria	8	(1)
1995	Milan	6	(1)
1995–1997	Parma	42	(4)
1997–2000	Perugia	51	(3)
2000	Ancona	13	(4)
Total		327	(65)

International career
1988	Italy U18	2	(0)
1989–1992	Italy U21	20	(8)
1993	Italy	2	(0)
- * Club domestic league appearances and goals

Alessandro "Sandro" Melli (Italian pronunciation: [(ales)ˈsandro ˈmɛlli]; born 11 December 1969) is an Italian former footballer who played as a striker. He won five team honours in his professional career.

== Club career ==
Melli's father was a professional footballer, playing as a centre forward for Parma AC, and the son followed in his footsteps. He made his Parma debut aged 17, and was part of the team that was promoted from the third to the top level.

After a loan spell at Modena FC that was cut short when he fell out with coach Paolo Ferrari, Melli returned to Parma, quickly establishing himself in Parma's first team in the early 1990s, in what was a golden period for the club. As part of that ducali squad, he won an Italian Cup in 1991–92, and a UEFA Cup Winners' Cup in the following season (in the final of which he scored), being part of an attacking line-up that featured also Faustino Asprilla, Tomas Brolin and Gianfranco Zola.

Melli left Parma in 1994, spending six months each at UC Sampdoria and AC Milan (who swapped Ruud Gullit for him), before returning to the Ennio Tardini after a year away. This lasted two years, but he did not manage to recapture his old form. In total, Melli scored 56 goals in 241 games for Parma.

He was transferred to Serie B side AC Perugia in 1997, where he immediately won promotion to the first division. He left Perugia in 2000, and ended his career with a season spell at AC Ancona.

After retiring, Melli eventually rejoined former side Parma's non-playing staff, serving as general manager.

== International career ==
During Parma's heyday, Melli was awarded with two caps for Italy, which came in the team's 1994 FIFA World Cup qualifiers against Malta and Estonia.

Previously, in 1992, he appeared at the Summer Olympics, netting in two group stage wins as Italy was eventually ousted by champions Spain, and helped the U21s win the UEFA European Championship.

== Honours ==
Parma

- UEFA Cup Winners' Cup: 1992–93
- UEFA Super Cup: 1993
- Coppa Italia: 1991–92

Milan

- UEFA Super Cup: 1994

Italy U-21

- UEFA European Under-21 Championship: 1992
