= Salvatore Matrecano =

Italian footballer (born 1970)

Personal information
- Date of birth: 5 October 1970 (age 56)
- Place of birth: Naples, Italy
- Height: 1.87 m (6 ft 2 in)
- Position: Defender

Youth career
- Atletico Sirio

Senior career*
Years	Team	Apps	(Gls)
1987–1988	Ercolano	1	(0)
1989–1990	Vigor Lamezia	4	(0)
1989–1990	Audax Ravagnese	20	(2)
1990–1991	Turris	33	(0)
1991–1992	Foggia	28	(0)
1992–1994	Parma	40	(1)
1994–1995	Napoli	20	(0)
1995–1996	Udinese	20	(0)
1996–1999	Perugia	88	(3)
1999–2001	Nottingham Forest	11	(0)
2001–2002	Benevento	23	(1)
2002–2003	Casertana	2	(0)
Total		290	(7)

International career
1991–1992	Italy U21	7	(0)
1993	Italy Olympics	5	(0)
1993	Italy U23	3	(0)

Managerial career
- 2008: Perugia (interim)
- 2009: Pontevecchio
- 2010: Foligno
- 2017: Paganese
- * Club domestic league appearances and goals

Salvatore Matrecano (born 5 October 1970) is an Italian former footballer turned football coach, who played as a defender. He was most recently head coach of the Serie C team Paganese.

== Club career ==
During his career, Matrecano played for several clubs, including the Italian sides Parma and Perugia, and the English side Nottingham Forest.

== International career ==
At international level, Matrecano represented Italy at the 1992 Summer Olympics.
