= Luigi Apolloni =

Italian footballer (born 1967)

Personal information
- Date of birth: 2 May 1967 (age 59)
- Place of birth: Frascati, Italy
- Height: 1.85 m (6 ft 1 in)
- Position: Defender

Youth career
- Lodigiani

Senior career*
Years	Team	Apps	(Gls)
1984–1986	Pistoiese	35	(0)
1986–1987	Reggiana	32	(0)
1987–2000	Parma	304	(8)
1999–2000	→ Verona (loan)	28	(2)
2000–2001	Verona	23	(0)
Total		422	(10)

International career
1994–1996	Italy	15	(1)

Managerial career
- 2009–2010: Modena
- 2010: Grosseto
- 2012: Gubbio
- 2012–2013: Reggiana
- 2013–2014: Gorica
- 2015: Lentigione
- 2015–2016: Parma
- 2018–2019: Modena
Medal record
Representing Italy (as player)
FIFA World Cup
Runner-up	1994
- * Club domestic league appearances and goals

Luigi Apolloni (Italian pronunciation: [luˈiːdʒi apolˈlɔːni]; born 2 May 1967) is an Italian football manager and former player, who played as a centre-back. At club level, Apolloni is mainly remembered for his time with Italian side Parma Calcio 1913, where he won several titles during his 13 seasons with the club. At international level, he was a member of the Italy national team that reached the final of the 1994 FIFA World Cup.

== Club career ==
Born in Frascati, Apolloni started his career with Lodigiani in 1983–84 in Serie C2, without ever get off the field in the first team to advance to Pistoiese within two years, where he debuted in professional football.

After another year in Serie C1 to Reggiana, he joined Parma in 1987, became a key member of the squad and a mainstay in the team's defensive lineup alongside Lorenzo Minotti; the two players formed a notable central defensive partnership at the club, helping to guide the team from the Serie B to Serie A, and eventually, to the top levels of European football. Their time at the club included triumphs in the 1991–92 Coppa Italia, a Cup Winners' Cup and UEFA Super Cup in 1993, a runners-up medal in their 1993–94 European Cup Winners' Cup campaign, and two UEFA Cups in 1995 and 1999, as well as the Supercoppa Italiana and another Coppa Italia in 1999, a runners-up medal in the 1995 Supercoppa Italiana, and third and second-place finishes in Serie A in 1995 and 1997 respectively.

In 1996, a serious injury forced him out, and Apolloni did not manage to win back a place in the starting lineup, ultimately leaving Parma in 1999 to join Hellas Verona, and later ending his career in 2001 with a total of 255 appearances and 7 goals in the Italian top flight.

== International career ==
Following his successes with Parma, Apolloni gained a spot in the Italian squad under head coach Arrigo Sacchi, making his international debut on 27 May 1994, in a 2–0 home win against Finland, coincidentally in Parma. Overall, he made 15 appearances for Italy between 1994 and 1996, and was a member of the azzurri squad that took part at the 1994 FIFA World Cup, where they reached the final, in which he appeared, only to lose to Brazil on penalties. He was also a part of their less successful Euro 1996 campaign, appearing in Italy's opening two group matches, a 2–1 win over a Russia, and a 2–1 defeat to eventual runners-up the Czech Republic, in which he was sent off; the Italians were eliminated in the first round of the tournament following a 0–0 draw against eventual champions Germany.

== Style of play ==
Apolloni was known to be a physically powerful and aggressive man-marking centre-back, known as a stopper in Italian football jargon, who possessed a strong mentality and leadership qualities. He was known for his ability in the air, and to put pressure on opponents and close them down; he was also notorious for his tendency to pick-up cards, however. He was considered to be one of the best Italian defenders of his generation, and formed one of the strongest defensive partnerships in Serie A of the 1990s, along with Parma teammate Lorenzo Minotti.

== Style of management ==
As a manager, Apolloni has mainly used a 4–2–3–1 system, but has also used a 4–3–3 and 3–5–2 formations on occasion. He is known for his ability to bring out the best of his players, with a focus on their individual qualities. His team is centred around efficiency and the tactical versatility of his midfielders. His style has been likened to that of Roberto Donadoni.

== Managerial career ==
In 2006, Apolloni accepted to follow former Parma teammate Daniele Zoratto, serving as his aide at Modena. He was later sacked together with head coach Zoratto in February 2007, only to return at Modena in April 2008.

In January 2009, Apolloni was appointed as caretaker manager of the canarini after Zoratto left the club by mutual consent. He was then permanently appointed to the role after he managed to guide Modena to escape relegation at the final day of the season. In his first full season in charge of the club, Apolloni guided Modena to a mid-table place in the league despite severe financial issues within the club. In July 2010 he left Modena to join ambitious Serie B club Grosseto. He was however removed by the end of September due to poor results, and replaced by Francesco Moriero.

On 2 April 2012, he was appointed as new head coach of Gubbio in the Italian Serie B league until the end of the season, thus becoming the fourth manager of the season for the small relegation-threatened Umbrian club (after Fabio Pecchia, Luigi Simoni and Marco Alessandrini).

On 31 May 2018, Apolloni was appointed as the manager of Modena. It lasted until 10 January 2019, where he was fired.

== Managerial statistics ==
As of match played 6 January 2019

Managerial record by team and tenure
Team	Nat	From	To	Record							
Team	Nat	From	To	G	W	D	L	GF	GA	GD	Win %
Modena	(Italy)	26 January 2009	23 June 2010	63	24	18	21	70	74	−4	38.10
Grosseto	(Italy)	23 June 2010	27 September 2010	7	2	2	3	9	6	+3	28.57
Gubbio	(Italy)	2 April 2012	23 June 2012	9	1	2	6	6	15	−9	11.11
Reggiana	(Italy)	28 December 2012	19 March 2013	9	2	1	6	5	16	−11	22.22
Gorica	(Slovenia)	13 June 2013	6 October 2014	58	25	14	19	88	57	+31	43.10
Lentigione	(Italy)	20 June 2015	3 July 2015	0	0	0	0	0	0	+0	—
Parma	(Italy)	3 July 2015	22 November 2016	58	37	16	5	112	42	+70	63.79
Modena	(Italy)	31 May 2018	10 January 2019	19	11	5	3	31	20	+11	57.89
Total				223	102	58	63	321	230	+91	45.74

== Honours ==
=== Player ===
Parma

- Coppa Italia: 1991–92, 1998–99
- Supercoppa Italiana: 1999
- UEFA Cup: 1994–95, 1998–99
- UEFA Cup Winners' Cup: 1992–93
- UEFA Super Cup: 1993

Italy

- FIFA World Cup runner-up: 1994
