= Daniele Zoratto =

Italian footballer (born 1961)

Personal information
- Date of birth: 15 November 1961 (age 64)
- Place of birth: Esch-sur-Alzette, Luxembourg
- Height: 1.67 m (5 ft 6 in)
- Position: Central midfielder

Team information
- Current team: Italy U17 (head coach)

Senior career*
Years	Team	Apps	(Gls)
1978–1979	Piobbico	?	(?)
1979–1980	Casale	4	(0)
1980–1981	Bellaria	?	(?)
1981–1982	Cesena	7	(0)
1982–1983	Rimini	32	(1)
1983–1989	Brescia	167	(6)
1989–1994	Parma	144	(0)
1994–1995	Padova	17	(0)

International career
1993	Italy	1	(0)

Managerial career
- 1995–1997: Voluntas Calcio
- 1997–2002: Brescia (youth team)
- 2002–2004: Parma (technical assistant)
- 2004–2006: Parma (assistant coach)
- 2006–2007: Modena
- 2008–2009: Modena
- 2009–2010: Torino (assistant coach)
- 2010–2011: Italy U19
- 2011–: Italy U16 & Italy U17
- * Club domestic league appearances and goals

Daniele Zoratto (Italian pronunciation: [daˈnjɛːle ddzoˈratto]; born 15 November 1961) is an Italian association football coach and former player who played as a midfielder.

== Personal life ==
Zoratto was born in Esch-sur-Alzette, Luxembourg as a son of Italian immigrants; his father worked there as a factory worker, while his mother was running a bar. At just nine months of age, he was however sent to Piobbico, Marche to live with his aunt as his parents had decided it was best for him to have an Italian education.

== Playing career ==
In his early club career, Zoratto played for AC Cesena and Rimini Calcio, before making a name for himself with Brescia Calcio in the 1980s. He is best known as one of AC Parma's most prominent players during the early 1990s. Notably, he played for Parma from 1989 – the year in which the gialloblu were promoted to Serie A for their first time ever – to 1994, winning a Coppa Italia, a European Super Cup, and a Cup Winners' Cup with the team, among other titles. He retired from professional football in 1995, after a season with Calcio Padova 1910.

At international level, Zoratto was also capped once for the Italy national football team by coach Arrigo Sacchi on 1 May 1993, in a 1–0 away defeat against Switzerland in a 1994 FIFA World Cup qualification match.

== Managerial career ==
In 2006, after a few years as Parma youth coach, Zoratto became head coach of Serie B club Modena F.C., with his old fellow player Luigi Apolloni, a former Italy international too, as assistant. Zoratto was however sacked in February 2007 because of lack of impressive results. In April 2008 he was re-appointed at the helm of Modena as replacement for Bortolo Mutti, sacked because of poor results.

He was confirmed at the helm of the canarini (canaries) for the 2008–09 season, however poor results and club problems led his team to a bottom-table place in the mid-season, this resulting to Zoratto and Modena parting company on January 26, 2009, with assistant manager Apolloni taking over from him.

In November 2009 he was appointed new assistant manager at Torino as part of the new coaching staff of new trainer Mario Beretta, a position he left in January 2010.

In August 2010 he was appointed as new head coach of the Italy U19 team, and was later appointed as the head coach of the Italy U17 team.

== Style of play ==
Normally a central or defensive midfielder, Zoratto was a diminutive and slender player, with good feet, who was known for his intelligence and passing ability. He was used as a regista or deep-lying playmaker in midfield under manager Nevio Scala during his time at Parma, due to his ability to dictate the tempo of his team's play, which was key to Scala's possession-based philosophy. He was also capable of playing higher up, behind the forwards, in order to create opportunities, but he was not known for his goalscoring from midfield, however, having failed to score a single goal in Serie A throughout his career.
