= 1991–92 Parma AC season =

Parma
1991–92 season
- Owner: Parmalat
- President: Giorgio Pedraneschi
- Manager: Nevio Scala
- Stadium: Stadio Ennio Tardini
- Serie A: 6th
- Coppa Italia: Winners
- UEFA Cup: First round
- Top goalscorer: League: Alessandro Melli (6); All: Alessandro Melli (11)
Home colours	Away colours

Parma Associazione Calcio eased through the infamous second season following promotion, and ended it in style by winning Coppa Italia, the club's first ever significant silverware. That also qualified the club for the 1992–93 UEFA Cup Winners' Cup, a tournament it went on to win. Its inaugural European adventure was in the autumn of 1991, when it lost to CSKA Sofia of Bulgaria in the first round of the UEFA Cup. It did not improve on 1991's famous fifth place in Serie A as rookies, but only slipped one position, with the defence playing as well as ever. The lack of a top scorer cost Parma the chance to fight Torino for third in the championship.

== Players ==
Note: Flags indicate national team as defined under FIFA eligibility rules; some limited exceptions apply. Players may hold more than one non-FIFA nationality.

Pos.	Nation	Player
GK	BRA	Cláudio Taffarel
GK	ITA	Marco Ballotta
DF	ITA	Antonio Benarrivo
DF	ITA	Luigi Apolloni
DF	ITA	Alberto Di Chiara
DF	ITA	Lorenzo Minotti
DF	ITA	Stefano Nava
DF	BEL	Georges Grün
DF	ITA	Cornelio Donati
DF	ITA	Giovanni Bia
DF	ITA	Antonio Sconziano

Pos.	Nation	Player
DF	ITA	Sebastiano Siviglia
MF	ITA	Daniele Zoratto
MF	ITA	Stefano Cuoghi
MF	ITA	Tarcisio Catanese
MF	ITA	Ivo Pulga
MF	SWE	Tomas Brolin
MF	ITA	Marco Osio
MF	ITA	Diego Ficarra
FW	ITA	Alessandro Melli
FW	ITA	Massimo Agostini
FW	ITA	Mario Lemme

=== Transfers ===
In
Pos.	Name	from	Type
GK	Marco Ballotta	Cesena	
DF	Antonio Benarrivo	Padova	
DF	Alberto Di Chiara	Fiorentina	
MF	Ivo Pulga	Cagliari	
FW	Massimo Agostini	AC Milan	
DF	Stefano Nava	AC Milan	loan

Out
Pos.	Name	To	Type
DF	Enzo Gambaro	AC Milan	
MF	Stefano Rossini	Udinese	
MF	Aldo Monza	Modena	loan
FW	Graziano Mannari	AC Siena	loan
MF	Giovanni Sorce	Lucchese	loan
GK	Marco Ferrari	Avellino	loan

== Competitions ==
=== Serie A ===
==== League table ====
Pos	Team	Pld	W	D	L	GF	GA	GD	Pts	Qualification or relegation
5	Roma	34	13	14	7	37	31	+6	40	Qualification to UEFA Cup
6	Sampdoria	34	11	16	7	38	31	+7	38	
7	Parma	34	11	16	7	32	28	+4	38	Qualification to Cup Winners' Cup
8	Internazionale	34	10	17	7	28	28	0	37	
9	Foggia	34	12	11	11	58	58	0	35	

Source: 1991–92 Serie A, RSSSF.com
Rules for classification: 1) Points; 2) Head-to-head points; 3) Head-to-head goal difference; 4) Goal difference; 5) Goals scored; 6) Draw.

==== Results by round ====
Round	1	2	3	4	5	6	7	8	9	10	11	12	13	14	15	16	17	18	19	20	21	22	23	24	25	26	27	28	29	30	31	32	33	34
Ground	H	A	H	A	H	A	A	H	A	H	A	H	H	A	H	A	H	A	H	A	H	A	H	H	A	H	A	H	A	A	H	A	H	A
Result	D	W	D	D	D	W	L	D	D	D	D	W	L	W	L	W	D	W	D	W	W	W	L	L	D	L	D	D	D	W	L	D	W	D
Position	7	3	4	4	6	2	7	8	8	7	9	6	7	4	6	4	5	4	4	4	3	3	4	4	4	5	6	6	5	5	5	6	6	7

Source: Competitive matches
A = Away; H = Home; W = Win; D = Draw; L = Loss; = 1992–93 European Cup; = 1992–93 UEFA Cup; = 1992–93 Serie B; c = As 1991-92 Coppa Italia winners', qualified to 1992-93 UEFA Cup Winners' Cup.

==== Matches ====
1 September 1991 1	Lazio	1–1	Parma	Rome
	Nava 63' (o.g.)	Report	Osio 89'	Stadium: Stadio Olimpico; Referee: Carlo Sguizzato

8 September 1991 2	Parma	1–0	Bari	Parma
	Minotti 33'	Report		Stadium: Stadio Ennio Tardini; Referee: Marcello Nicchi

15 September 1991 3	Napoli	2–2	Parma	Naples
	Zola 20'; Careca 40'	Report	Corradini 14' (o.g.); Brolin 50'; Cuoghi (red card) 62'	Stadium: Stadio San Paolo; Referee: Walter Cinciripini

22 September 1991 4	Parma	1–1	Cremonese	Parma
	Agostini 53'	Report	Pulga 46' (o.g.); Giandebiaggi (red card) 51'	Stadium: Stadio Ennio Tardini; Referee: Fabio Baldas

29 September 1991 5	Foggia	1–1	Parma	Foggia
	Signori 70'	Report	Melli 87'	Stadium: Stadio Pino Zaccheria; Referee: Pietro D'Elia

6 October 1991 6	Parma	2–1	Sampdoria	Parma
	Minotti 13'; Grün 59'	Report	Vialli 57' (pen.)	Stadium: Stadio Ennio Tardini; Referee: Tullio Lanese

20 October 1991 7	Milan	2–0	Parma	Milan
	Gullit 59' van Basten 81'	Report		Stadium: San Siro; Attendance: 74,929; Referee: Loris Stafoggia

27 October 1991 8	Parma	0–0	Torino	Parma
		Report		Stadium: Stadio Ennio Tardini; Referee: Livio Bazzoli

3 November 1991 9	Parma	1–1	Verona	Parma
	Icardi 89' (o.g.)	Report	Prytz 54' (pen.); Pellegrini (red card) 14'	Stadium: Stadio Ennio Tardini; Referee: Pierluigi Pairetto

17 November 1991 10	Cagliari	0–0	Parma	Cagliari
		Report	Taffarel (red card) 13'	Stadium: Stadio Sant'Elia; Referee: Massimo Chiesa

24 November 1991 11	Parma	1–1	Inter	Parma
	Cuoghi 31'	Report	Fontolan 14'	Stadium: Stadio Ennio Tardini; Referee: Alfredo Trentalange

1 December 1991 12	Atalanta	0–1	Parma	Bergamo
	Careca Bianchese (red card) 88'	Report	Melli 10'	Stadium: Stadio Comunale; Referee: Giuseppe Rosica

8 December 1991 13	Genoa	2–0	Parma	Genoa
	Aguilera 20'; Grün 87' (o.g.)	Report		Stadium: Stadio Luigi Ferraris; Referee: Virginio Quartuccio

15 December 1991 14	Parma	3–1	Roma	Parma
	Nela 15' (o.g.); Osio 55'; Melli 76'	Report	Di Mauro 12'	Stadium: Stadio Ennio Tardini; Referee: Gianni Beschin

5 January 1992 15	Juventus	1–0	Parma	Turin
	R. Baggio 71'	Report		Stadium: Stadio delle Alpi; Referee: Luciano Luci

12 January 1992 16	Parma	2–0	Ascoli	Parma
	Melli 55'; Minotti 59'	Report	Aloisi (red card) 90'	Stadium: Stadio Ennio Tardini; Referee: Paolo De Angelis

19 January 1992 17	Fiorentina	1–1	Parma	Florence
	Apolloni 1' (o.g.); Pioli (red card) 26'	Report	Grün 49'	Stadium: Stadio Comunale; Referee: Tullio Lanese

26 January 1992 18	Parma	1–0	Lazio	Parma
	Brolin 42'	Report		Stadium: Stadio Ennio Tardini; Referee: Loris Stafoggia

2 February 1992 19	Bari	1–1	Parma	Bari
	Calcaterra (red card) 41'; Fortunato 69'	Report	Di Chiara 28'	Stadium: Stadio San Nicola; Referee: Pierluigi Pairetto

9 February 1992 20	Parma	2–1	Napoli	Parma
	Melli 38' (pen.); Grün 90'	Report	Careca 21' (pen.)	Stadium: Stadio Ennio Tardini; Referee: Gianni Beschin

16 February 1992 21	Cremonese	0–1	Parma	Cremona
		Report	Dezotti 19' (o.g.)	Stadium: Stadio Giovanni Zini; Referee: Piero Ceccarini

23 February 1992 22	Parma	2–0	Foggia	Parma
	Agostini 30', 55'	Report	Mancini (red card) 58'	Stadium: Stadio Ennio Tardini; Referee: Angelo Amendolia

1 March 1992 23	Sampdoria	2–0	Parma	Genoa
	Orlando 67'; Mancini 90'	Report		Stadium: Stadio Luigi Ferraris; Referee: Pierluigi Collina

8 March 1992 24	Parma	1–3	Milan	Parma
	Melli 33'	Report	Simone 48', 76'; Grün 84' (o.g.)	Stadium: Stadio Ennio Tardini; Attendance: 25,428; Referee: Pietro D'Elia

15 March 1992 25	Torino	0–0	Parma	Turin
		Report		Stadium: Stadio Comunale; Referee: Carlo Sguizzato

29 March 1992 26	Verona	1–0	Parma	Verona
	Renica 39'; L. Pellegrini (red card) 90'	Report	Zoratto (red card) 80'; Di Chiara (red card) 90'	Stadium: Stadio Marc'Antonio Bentegodi; Referee: Piero Ceccarini

5 April 1992 27	Parma	1–1	Cagliari	Parma
	Agostini 45'	Report	Herrera 7'	Stadium: Stadio Ennio Tardini; Referee: Paolo Fabricatore

12 April 1992 28	Inter	0–0	Parma	Milan
		Report		Stadium: San Siro; Referee: Marcello Nicchi

18 April 1992 29	Parma	0–0	Atalanta	Parma
		Report	Careca Bianchese (red card) 61'	Stadium: Stadio Ennio Tardini; Referee: Carlo Sguizzato

26 April 1992 30	Parma	2–0	Genoa	Parma
	Minotti 64'; Brolin 78'	Report		Stadium: Stadio Ennio Tardini; Referee: Loris Stafoggia

3 May 1992 31	Roma	1–0	Parma	Rome
	Rizzitelli 75'	Report		Stadium: Stadio Olimpico; Referee: Alfredo Trentalange

10 May 1992 32	Parma	0–0	Juventus	Parma
		Report		Stadium: Stadio Ennio Tardini; Referee: Robert Anthony Boggi

17 May 1992 33	Ascoli	2–3	Parma	Ascoli Piceno
	Troglio 4'; Maniero 45'	Report	Catanese 17', 90' (pen.); Grün 51'	Stadium: Stadio Cino e Lillo Del Duca; Referee: Gianni Beschin

24 May 1992 34	Parma	1–1	Fiorentina	Parma
	Brolin 89' (pen.)	Report	Maiellaro 43'	Stadium: Stadio Ennio Tardini; Referee: Massimo Chiesa

=== Coppa Italia ===
==== Second round ====
28 August 1991 First leg	Parma	0–0	Palermo	Parma
				Stadium: Stadio Ennio Tardini; Referee: Massimo Chiesa

3 September 1991 Second leg	Palermo	1–2	Parma	Palermo
	De Sensi 66'		Grün 1'; Melli 84'	Stadium: Stadio La Favorita; Referee: Piero Ceccarini

==== Round of 16 ====
29 October 1991 First leg	Parma	0–0	Fiorentina	Parma
20:30 CEST (UTC+01:00)				Stadium: Stadio Ennio Tardini; Attendance: 9,000; Referee: Carlo Sguizzato

4 December 1991 Second leg	Fiorentina	1–1	Parma	Florence
16:00 CEST (UTC+01:00)	Borgonovo 33'		Brolin 63'	Stadium: Stadio Comunale; Referee: Tullio Lanese

==== Quarter-finals ====
12 February 1992 First leg	Parma	2–0	Genoa	Parma
19:30 CEST (UTC+01:00)	Minotti 68'; Catanese 87'			Stadium: Stadio Ennio Tardini; Attendance: 15,000; Referee: Carlo Sguizzato

27 February 1992 Second leg	Genoa	1–2	Parma	Genoa
20:30 CEST (UTC+01:00)	Aguilera 10'		Signorini 16' (o.g.); Melli 53'	Stadium: Stadio Luigi Ferraris; Attendance: 10,000; Referee: Fabio Baldas

==== Semi-final ====
21 March 1992 First leg	Parma	1–0	Sampdoria	Parma
	Brolin 50'			Stadium: Stadio Ennio Tardini; Attendance: 25,000; Referee: Gianni Beschin

30 April 1992 Second leg	Sampdoria	2–2 (a.e.t.)	Parma	Genoa
20:30 CEST (UTC+02:00)	Pari 77'; Vierchowod 120'		Melli 97', 103' (pen.)	Stadium: Stadio Luigi Ferraris; Attendance: 10,000; Referee: Angelo Amendolia

==== Final ====
7 May 1992 First leg	Juventus	1–0	Parma	Turin
20:30 CEST (UTC+02:00)	Baggio 23' (pen.); Júlio César da Silva (yellow card) 73'		Melli (yellow card) 45'	Stadium: Stadio delle Alpi; Attendance: 47,872; Referee: Rosario Lo Bello

14 May 1992 Second leg	Parma	2–0	Juventus	Parma
20:30 CEST (UTC+02:00)	Melli 45'; Apolloni (yellow card) 50'; Osio 61'; Cuoghi (yellow card) 64'; Minotti (yellow card) 73'		De Agostini (yellow card) 17'; Schillaci (yellow card) 19'; Reuter (yellow card) 33'; Luppi (yellow card) 39'; Kohler (yellow card) 45'; Conte (red card) 88'	Stadium: Stadio Ennio Tardini; Attendance: 24,471; Referee: Fabio Baldas

=== UEFA Cup ===
==== First round ====
19 September 1991 First leg	CSKA Sofia (Bulgaria)	0–0	(Italy) Parma	Sofia, Bulgaria
19:30 CEST (UTC+02:00)	Gueorguiev (yellow card) 4'; Dimitrov (yellow card) 33'; Vidov (yellow card) 68'	Report	Benarrivo (yellow card) 28'; Cuoghi (yellow card) 32'; Grün (yellow card) 50'	Stadium: Balgarska Armia Stadium; Referee: Ray Lewis (England)

2 October 1991 Second leg	Parma (Italy)	1–1 (1–1a agg.)	(Bulgaria) CSKA Sofia	Parma, Italy
18:15 CEST (UTC+02:00)	Agostini (yellow card) 63', (goal) 71'; Minotti (yellow card) 73'; Pulga (yellow card) 88'	Report	Velinov (yellow card) 57'; Dimitrov (yellow card) 61'; Lechkov (yellow card) 70'; Mitev 89'	Stadium: Stadio Ennio Tardini; Referee: Guy Goethals (Belgium)

== Statistics ==
=== Players statistics ===
No.	Pos	Nat	Player	Total		Serie A		Coppa		UEFA	
No.	Pos	Nat	Player	Apps	Goals	Apps	Goals	Apps	Goals	Apps	Goals
	GK	(Brazil) BRA	Cláudio Taffarel	39	-30	34	-28	3	-1	2	-1
	DF	(Italy) ITA	Antonio Benarrivo	41	0	27+3	0	9	0	2	0
	DF	(Italy) ITA	Lorenzo Minotti	45	5	33	4	10	1	2	0
	DF	(Belgium) BEL	Georges Grün	43	5	33	4	8	1	2	0
	DF	(Italy) ITA	Luigi Apolloni	43	0	32	0	9	0	2	0
	DF	(Italy) ITA	Alberto Di Chiara	39	1	31	1	7	0	1	0
	MF	(Italy) ITA	Daniele Zoratto	44	0	32	0	10	0	2	0
	MF	(Italy) ITA	Stefano Cuoghi	41	1	31	1	8	0	2	0
	MF	(Sweden) SWE	Tomas Brolin	44	6	28+6	4	8	2	2	0
	MF	(Italy) ITA	Marco Osio	36	3	23+3	2	9	1	1	0
	FW	(Italy) ITA	Alessandro Melli	41	11	25+5	6	9	5	2	0
	GK	(Italy) ITA	Marco Ballotta	8	-5	0+1	0	7	-5	0	0
	FW	(Italy) ITA	Massimo Agostini	41	5	17+13	4	9	0	2	1
	DF	(Italy) ITA	Stefano Nava	28	0	12+7	0	7	0	2	0
	MF	(Italy) ITA	Ivo Pulga	22	0	10+5	0	5	0	2	0
	MF	(Italy) ITA	Tarcisio Catanese	28	3	4+16	2	8	1		
	DF	(Italy) ITA	Cornelio Donati	7	0	1+3	0	3	0		
	DF	(Italy) ITA	Giovanni Bia	1	0	1	0				
	DF	(Italy) ITA	Antonio Sconziano	0	0	0	0				
	MF	(Italy) ITA	Diego Ficarra	0	0	0	0				

- Source: http://calcio-seriea.net/presenze/1991/1029/
