= History of Parma Calcio 1913 =

The history of Parma Calcio 1913 covers nearly 100 years of the football from the club based in Parma, Italy. Established in 1913 the club would eventually go on to win titles on the national and international stage. The club is most famous for the period in which it collected all of its eight major titles, between 1992 and 2002. The club was declared bankrupt in 2015.

== Early years (1913–1940) ==
A football club was founded in Parma in July 1913 as Verdi Foot Ball Club in honour of famous opera composer Giuseppe Verdi, who was born in the province of Parma, adopting its unique white shirts emblazoned with a black cross on the front. The genesis came about after Verdi's death was commemorated with the dispute of the Coppa Verdi; the players who competed formed the basis of the first team of Parma Football Club, formed in December of the same year. Parma began playing league football during the 1919–20 season, finishing second in Emilian Championship qualifying. In 1922, the president at the time, Ennio Tardini, launched his plans to build a stadium for the club, as Parma initially had no permanent home, having previously used the Piazza d'Armi for two spells, land on the outskirts of the south-east of Parma and the Tre Pioppi. The Stadio Ennio Tardini would be named in the Italian lawyer's honour after he died before the stadium was opened the following year.

Parma were participating in the Emilian regional championship at this point, from which they would qualify to play nationally by performing well. They achieved their first promotion from a regional league during the 1924–25 season, moving from the Seconda Divisione to the Prima Divisione, before becoming founding members of Serie B after finishing runners-up in the Prima Divisione in the 1928–29 season. Parma made their debut in Serie B on 6 October 1929, beating Biellese 2–0. The team remained in Serie B for three years before being relegated to the Prima Divisione at the end of the 1931–32 season, the year before the club changed its name to Associazione Sportiva Parma. Having finished in the top two positions for three consecutive seasons in the Prima Divisione, Parma were accepted into the renamed third tier of Italian football for the 1935–36 season, Serie C, where they competed for the rest of the decade, achieving a best finish of fourth in 1939–40.

== Life as a provincial club (1940–1968) ==
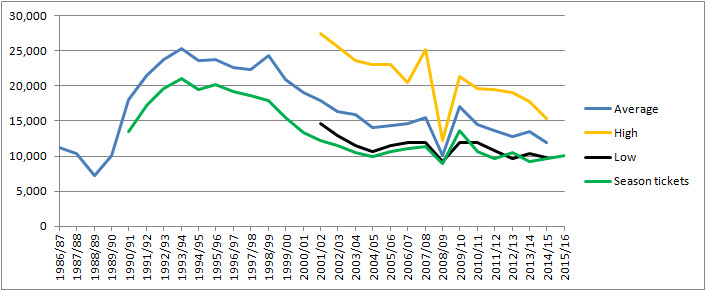
A graphical representation of the attendances at the Tardini since 1986. The red line represents the season high, the blue line the season average and the green line the season low.

After finishing as runners-up in 1941–42, Parma very nearly achieved a return to Serie B the next year, winning seventeen matches of nineteen and scoring 82 goals to top their group, before progressing to the final, where they would have won promotion but for their disqualification due to alleged corruption on the final day of the season in their match against Lecco. Italian football was then brought to a halt as World War II intensified, although Parma did make an appearance in the Campianto Alta Italia in 1944. Following the restart of organised football, Parma enjoyed three years in Serie B, then split into two regional divisions, before again being relegated in 1948–49 to Serie C after losing their relegation play–off by four goals to one against Spezia in Milan. Il Crociato then spent another five seasons in Serie C, where they finished second place on two occasions before gaining promotion once again in 1953–54 with the help of the prolific Czechoslovak left-winger Július Korostelev, who scored 15 of the side's 45 goals. While Korostelev headed the scoring charts that year, William Bronzoni was more consistent and remains the club's record league goalscorer to this day, having netted 78 times from 1945 to 1953

Following this promotion, one of the most successful periods in the club's history began, as the team would spend eleven consecutive years in the second tier and consistently finish mid-table; they would end up as high as ninth position in 1954–55, which represented a record for the club at that time. The stars of this era were Paolo Erba, who was named the capocannoniere, the league's top scorer, in 1956–57, and Ivo Cocconi, who set the club's appearance record, playing 308 times. Parma also made their debut on the European stage during the 1960–61 season, defeating Swiss side AC Bellinzona in the Coppa delle Alpi. The club's form dropped, however, and they were once again relegated to Serie C in the 1964–65 season, finishing last with just 23 points. Parma spent just one season in Serie C before they were relegated for a second successive season and found themselves in Serie D in 1966. The club was in turmoil and, having been ordered into liquidation by the Court of Parma in 1968, it was the absorption of local side A.C. Parmense that brought about a change of fortunes in both financial and sporting terms and led to a change of name to Associazione Calcio Parma.

== Dipping into and out of lower league obscurity (1968–1985) ==
Parma topped their regional division in 1969–70, earning themselves promotion to Serie C, where they would remain for three years. In 1969, the club signed winger Bruno Mora, who was capped 21 times for Italy, went to the 1962 World Cup, won Serie A twice and the European Cup once and was the first person from Parma to play for the national team when he made his debut in 1959. He had previously turned the opportunity to play for Parma down due to its relatively small size, but he ended his career at the club in 1971 after a two-year stint wearing the cross. He would later manage the club for a short period in the early 1980s before his death in 1986. The club crept back into professional football with promotion to Serie B during the 1972–73 season after a 2–0 play-off victory over Udinese in Vicenza, but would spend just two seasons in the league, although they did manage to finish as high as 5th in 1973–74, setting a new club record in the process. Relegation the following year saw the club return to Serie C, where they would stay until their promotion under Cesare Maldini in 1978–79.

Maldini-led Parma beat Triestina 3–1 after extra time in a play-off match, thanks to two goals from a young Carlo Ancelotti, who moved to Roma that summer after his starring role. However, they only lasted a season in Serie B and began the 1980s back down in Serie C. In 1982–83, Massimo Barbuti arrived at Parma, a player who is still referred today as l'idolo della Nord, or the idol of the North. He was so called for his popularity amongst those sitting in the Curva Nord, where Parma's staunchest fans have historically sat during home matches at the Tardini. Parma returned to Serie B as champions after winning their division in 1984 with 18 goals from Barbuti and final day victory over San Remo with Juventus-bound Stefano Poli scoring the only goal of the game. Il Ducali's stay in Serie B was shorter than hoped as they spent just one season in the league, finishing third from bottom and being relegated as a result. The disappointment led to the departure of cult hero Barbuti, a striker who scored 37 league goals in 98 appearances in just three years for the club and was loved by the fans for his tireless running, goalscoring record and manic celebrations in front of – and sometimes in — the Curva Nord at the Stadio Ennio Tardini.

== Two promotions (1985–1990) ==
Parma continued to yo-yo between the leagues and returned to Serie B under Arrigo Sacchi in 1986 after finishing level on points at the top of the league with Modena, having never previously seriously threatened to do so. Promotion was secured on the final day of the season with a 2–0 victory over Sanremese, a day on which Alessandro Melli, a player who would go on to play an important role in some of Parma's most famous triumphs and enjoy considerable success at the club in the process of doing so, scored his first goal for the Gialloblu. Parma's first season back in Serie B was a successful one, missing out on promotion to Italy's top tier by just three points and eliminating AC Milan from the Coppa Italia, a result that convinced their owner, Silvio Berlusconi, to hire Sacchi as the new manager of the Rossoneri. His replacement, Zdeněk Zeman, was fired after just seven matches and replaced by Giampieri Vitali, who secured two mid-table finishes before being replaced in 1989 by Nevio Scala, who would introduce a 5–3–2 formation that would be the basis for much of the club's success during his reign.

Scala's Parma led Serie B at the half-way mark and, despite the distress of a stadium disaster in a home match against Reggina in January and the death of owner Ernesto Ceresin in February seeing the Ducali fall to eighth, a late run of form and victory on the final day against old Derby del Grana rivals Reggiana with goals from fan favourite and right winger Marco Osio and forward Alessandro Melli meant Parma secured a historic promotion to Serie A on 27 May 1990. After Parma's promotion, Calisto Tanzi increased his stake in the ownership of the club to 45% with the purchase of the deceased Ceresin's sons' shares and named Giorgio Pedraneschi as president. This would allow Scala to supplement the squad that achieved promotion from Serie B, which included central defenders Luigi Apolloni and Lorenzo Minotti – Minotti also went on to captain the side – and star striker Alessandro Melli, with players such as Tomas Brolin, Claudio Taffarel and Georges Grun.

== Serie A and Scala's success (1990–1994) ==
The patch worn over Parma's badge in the seasons following their three Coppa Italia triumphs

Parma's first ever game in Serie A was a 2–1 defeat at home to Turin giants Juventus, which was followed by an inaugural Serie A victory 15 days later: 1–0 victory over Diego Maradona's Napoli. Parma ended their first ever season in Serie A in sixth place, which meant they qualified for the UEFA Cup. However, the 1991–92 season saw Parma exit the UEFA Cup to CSKA Sofia in the first round despite the notable additions of Antonio Benarrivo and Alberto Di Chiara, each of whom were full-backs that would go on to appear for Italy. The club had more success on the domestic front, where they finished sixth in the league – lack of a prolific scorer costing Parma the chance to fight Torino for third – and prevailed in the Coppa Italia final against Juventus. Losing the away leg 1–0, Parma managed to secure their first ever major trophy when they won the home leg 2–0 with a goal from Alessandro Melli on the stroke of half-time before Marco Osio struck on the hour mark. In 1991, Parmalat acquired the football club outright.

Parma's squad was further improved by the summer arrival of Colombian striker Faustino Asprilla and they managed a first major international trophy in 1993 when an early volley from captain Lorenzo Minotti from a corner, an Alessandro Melli header and a late Stefano Cuoghi strike helped Parma to a 3–1 victory in the Cup Winners' Cup over Belgian side Royal Antwerp at Wembley Stadium in England on 12 May 1993. They also managed a record high finish of third place, but slipped to defeat in the 1992 Supercoppa Italiana against A.C. Milan. The following season, the club were successful in the European Super Cup; winning an all Italian final against AC Milan. Having lost the first leg at home by a single goal to nil, victory was nonetheless secured after goals from new players Nestor Sensini and Massimo Crippa. The same season, however, they lost the Cup Winners' Cup 1–0 in the final against Arsenal and slipped to 5th in the league due to a leaky defence, despite new signing Gianfranco Zola scoring eighteen league goals as part of Parma's three-pronged forward line, alongside Brolin and Asprilla.

== More international fame (1994–1998) ==
The next year, bolstered by the acquisitions of Fernando Couto and Dino Baggio, Parma would face Juventus in a two-legged final, as they did in the 1992 domestic cup final, only this time the prize at stake was greater: the UEFA Cup. Dino Baggio scored the only goal of the first leg – played in Parma – with a far post header from close range and he scored again with a neat lob over Angelo Peruzzi in reply to Gianluca Vialli's strike in the second leg, which was staged in Milan, to give Parma a 2–1 aggregate win and a second major European trophy. Parma lost the Coppa Italia final, which pitted the same sides against each other over two legs, 2–1. Despite the signings of Hristo Stoichkov and Filippo Inzaghi and the encouraging form of young goalkeeper Gianluigi Buffon, a trophy-less 1995–96 followed and after seven years that yielded four major trophies, Nevio Scala, also Parma's longest-serving manager of all time, stepped down as manager. Carlo Ancelotti replaced him. The man presiding over the club's affairs during this period, president Pedraneschi, was also replaced by Stefano Tanzi, son of president Calisto.

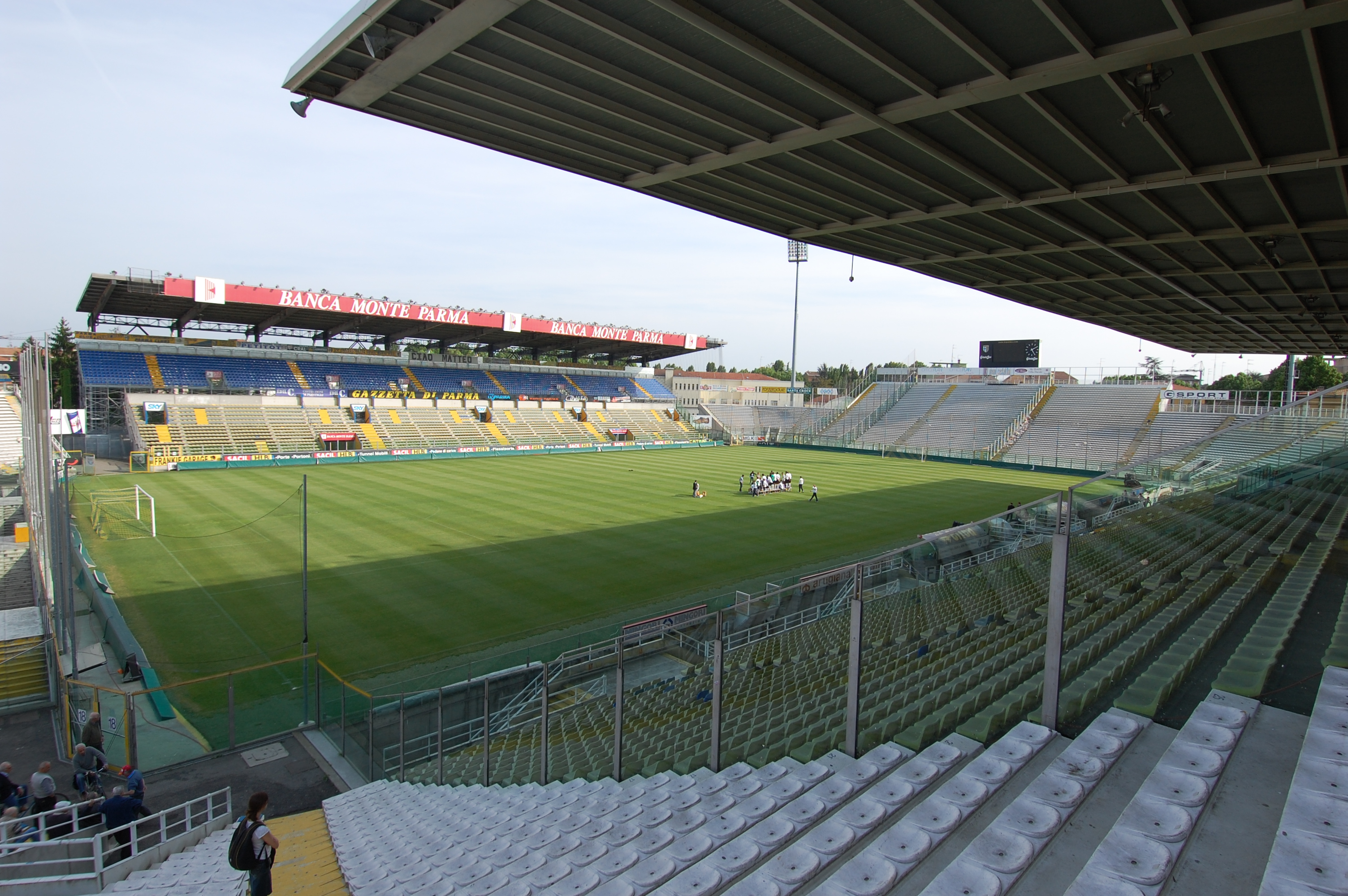
Stadio Ennio Tardini, Parma's home stadium

Ancelotti and Tanzi immediately overhauled the team that summer, signing Hernán Crespo, Enrico Chiesa and Zé Maria and selling Stoichkov, Couto, Inzaghi and Di Chiara. As the new leadership continued to make changes to the team, Zola, who had scored 49 goals in 102 league games for Parma, was sold to Chelsea for £4.5M in November 1996 as he was incompatible with the formation switch from 4–4–2 to 3–5–2, a decision Ancelotti has since expressed his regret over. However, the side packed full of stars were guided to the club's best ever league finish under Ancelotti in 1997: second place and only two points behind champions Juventus, who converted a dubiously awarded penalty against Parma in a 1–1 draw in May. As a result, Parma made their first appearance in the Champions League, but having beaten Widzew Łódź to qualify for the group stages, further qualification and a quarter-final was in part denied by a Borussia Dortmund side led by Nevio Scala. This, coupled with a disappointing finish in fifth position in Serie A led to the sacking of Ancelotti and the appointment of Alberto Malesani. A positive was the emergence of young talents Gianluigi Buffon, Fabio Cannavaro and Lilian Thuram, all of whom would later win World Cups for their countries.

== Further domestic and international success (1998–2001) ==
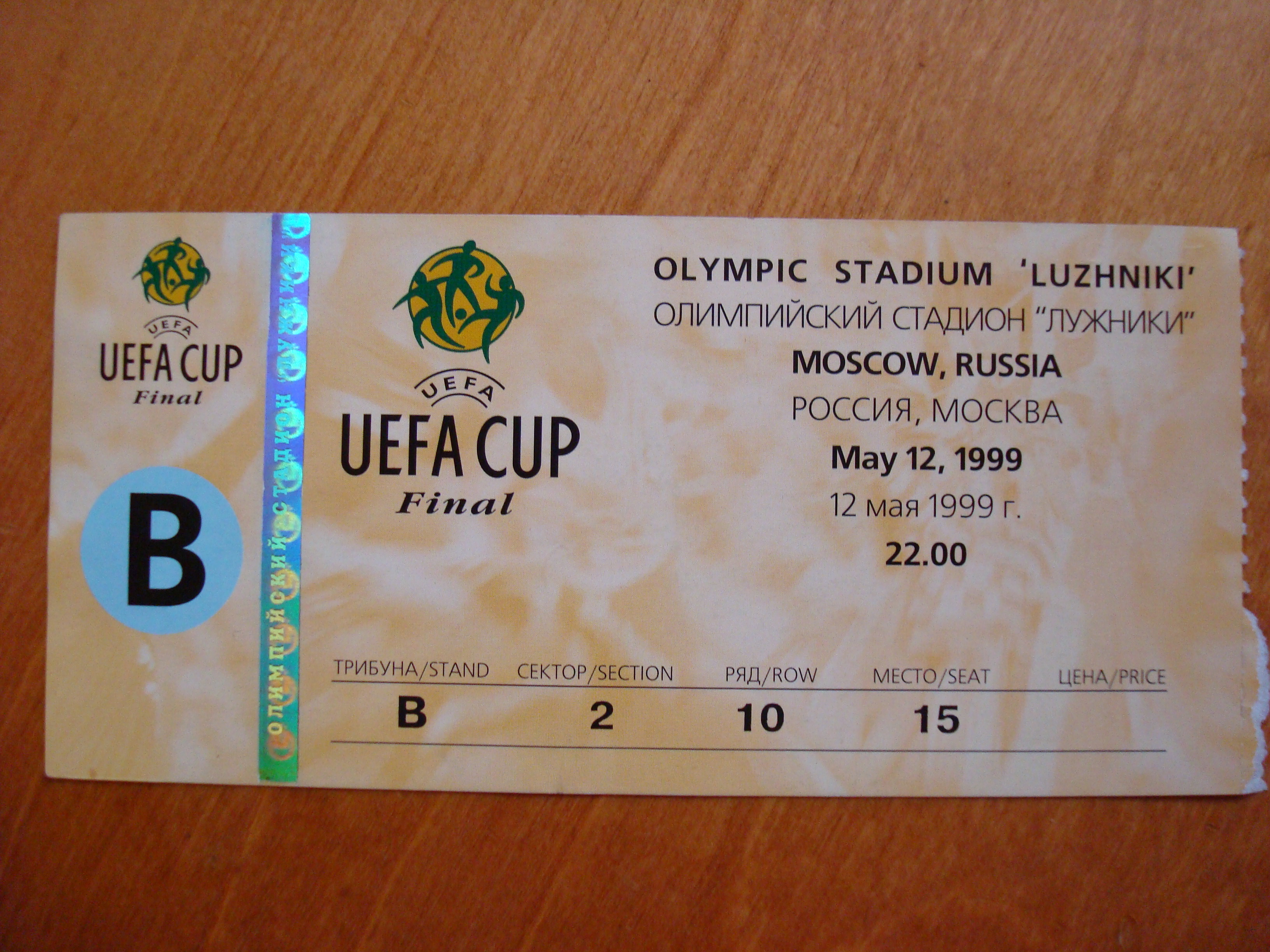
A ticket to the 1999 UEFA Cup final against Marseille, held in Moscow, Russia

Malesani's first business was the completion of the transfer of Juan Sebastián Verón from Sampdoria. Despite a disappointing finish in fourth place in Serie A, this season remains Parma's most successful ever, winning two cup competitions as Parma adopted yellow and blue horizontal stripes for the first time in many years. On 14 April 1999, Parma and Fiorentina played out a 1–1 draw in the first leg of the Coppa Italia final with Crespo opening the scoring before compatriot Gabriel Batistuta equalised late on. Crespo scored twice in the second leg, played on 5 May in Florence, which ended 2–2, meaning Parma won on the away goals rule, lifting their second Coppa Italia. Just three days earlier, Parma had won their second UEFA Cup with a comfortable 3–0 victory over Marseille at the Luzhniki Stadium. Crespo capitalised on an early defensive error by the French defence to open the scoring, before a well-placed Paolo Vanoli header before half-time and an Enrico Chiesa volley secured the triumph. The UEFA Cup win was later tainted by the release of footage showing Fabio Cannavaro receiving injections of neoton, raising suspicions that he was doping, although these claims have never been proved true.

Joy at an early season trophy, the Italian Super Cup after victory over league champions A.C. Milan, was somewhat tempered by the sale of Verón, who was replaced by the disappointing Ariel Ortega, and early Champions League elimination at the hands of Rangers. Parma went on to finish fourth for a second consecutive season in the league, level with Inter Milan, but losing the play–off 3–1 against the Milan giants, consigning them to UEFA Cup football. In the ensuing summer, Hernán Crespo was sold to Lazio for a then world record transfer fee in search of a league title, with Matías Almeyda and Sérgio Conceição coming the other way and part of the fee used to fund the purchases of Savo Milošević, but Parma would endure an unsatisfactory season in the ownership's eyes and Malesani made way for a brief return for Arrigo Sacchi in January 2001, who soon succumbed to poor health. New coach Renzo Ulivieri took over and led the side to fourth in the league once more, this time securing Champions League qualification, although Parma did lose the Coppa Italia final to Fiorentina 2–1 on aggregate. Replacing Crespo's goals had proved difficult and, although Marco Di Vaio proved a hit, Márcio Amoroso's continued poor form saw him offloaded to Borussia Dortmund for German record 56 million Deutsche Mark (€28.6 million). Co-currently Parma signed Hidetoshi Nakata for 55 billion lire (€28.4 million)

== Emergence of financial troubles (2001–2004) ==
The sale of Gianluigi Buffon and Lilian Thuram to rivals Juventus for a combined 180 billion lire (€92.96 million) paved the way to a disastrous start to the 2001—02 season, another early Champions League exit, this time at the hands of Lille, and the sacking of Uliveri in October and the hiring and firing of Daniel Passarella just two months later. Pietro Carmignani, perennially associated with the side's youth team, was appointed head coach and secured the most recently won prize in Parma's trophy cabinet when Parma came up against Juventus in yet another major final. Juventus won the first leg in Turin by two goals to one with Hidetoshi Nakata's injury-time goal proving crucial. Parma won the second leg 1–0 with an early deflected goal from Júnior, giving Parma the victory on away goals and a third Coppa Italia triumph. Only a run of good form late in the season saved Parma from relegation to Serie B. By 2002, every player that started the 1999 UEFA Cup triumph over Marseille had been moved on out of necessity. Parma's continued success throughout the 1990s and early 2000s earned them a tag as one of the "Seven Sisters" (Sette Sorelle), who dominated Italian football in that period, alongside Fiorentina, Inter Milan, Juventus, Lazio, Milan and Roma.

Cesare Prandelli was announced as the new man-in-charge of the Emilian side in May 2002. However, once more the winning players from the previous season were sold to raise money: Fabio Cannavaro went to Internazionale when he was club captain, Marco Di Vaio to Juventus and Johan Micoud to Werder Bremen and Parma slipped to an early season defeat in Tripoli to Juventus in the 2002 Supercoppa Italiana, but the depleted squad managed to finish above expectations in fifth place with the goals supplied by Adrian Mutu and Adriano in an attacking 4–3–3 formation, making up for the departure of Marco Di Vaio, and defensive solidity provided by Daniele Bonera and Matteo Ferrari. The following season, The sale of left-sided captain-to-be Mutu to Chelsea, injury to star striker Adriano, the culmination of Parmalat's financial meltdown - which resulted in the arrest of president Calisto Tanzi for embezzlement of money from parent company Parmalat and the re-formation of the club under a new name, Parma Football Club - and the threat of the club's continuing existence made life difficult for Parma, but they again finished fifth, in no small part due to the prolific Alberto Gilardino, who netted 23 league goals, a club record. On 28 April 2004, however, the club was declared insolvent. Calisto Tanzi's resignation came in January 2004.

== Decline on and off the pitch (2004–2008) ==
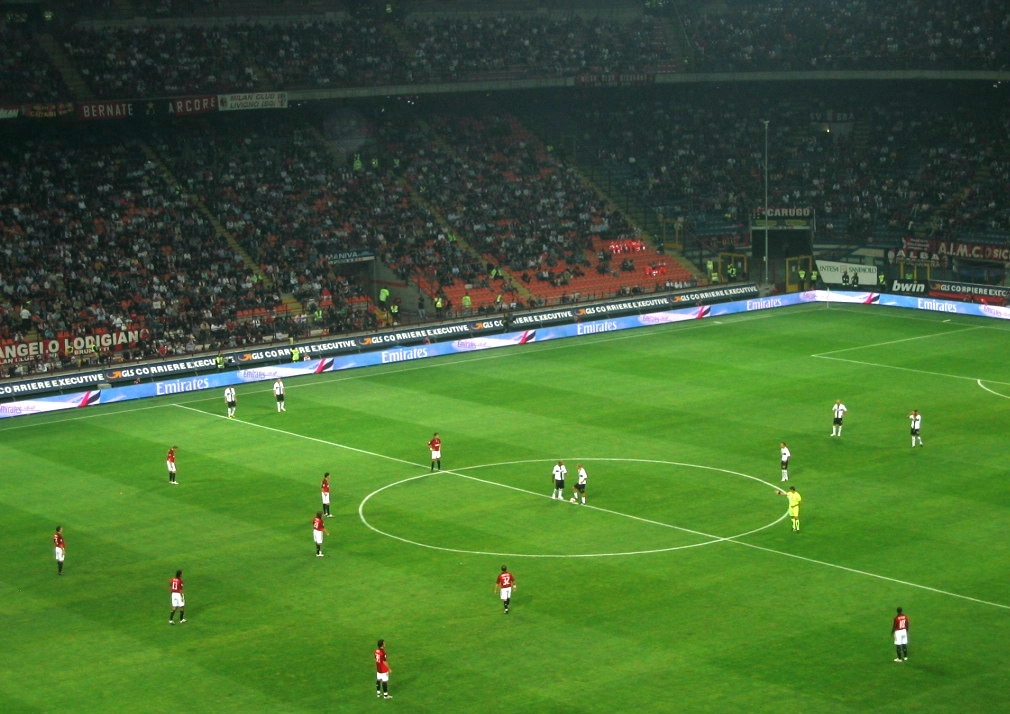
Parma prepare to kick off at Milan's San Siro in September 2007

After years of corporate and financial crisis due to the Crac Parmalat, Parma A.C. was renamed to Parma F.C. in June 2004. Prandelli's departure as manager preceded the 2004–05 season, as did the decision to revert to the club's traditional colours: white shirts again being adorned by black crosses, replacing the yellow and blue hoops associated with Parmalat's ownership. The club had to come out from previous sugar daddy model and saw Matteo Ferrari and Matteo Brighi were sold to Roma. Although Parma reached the semi-finals of the UEFA Cup, they plummeted to their lowest finish since promotion fifteen years earlier, appointing and relieving Silvio Baldini of his duties in the space of a few months and hiring Pietro Carmignani. All of this despite another 23-league goal haul from Alberto Gilardino. Parma's league position meant they had to contest a two-legged play-off against Bologna in order to stay in the top tier of Italian football. They won the play-off 2–1 on aggregate, having lost the first leg at home by a solitary goal. With the club still not having found a new owner after it was put up for sale at the beginning of January 2005, Enrico Bondi was made president and charged with securing a sale, continuing to sell Parma's most valuable assets, such as Gilardino, who left for AC Milan at the cost of €25M in the summer of 2005, having scored 50 league goals in 95 matches, and French goalkeeper Sébastien Frey who departed for Fiorentina. The Emilian outfit ended the following season with a finish in tenth place, but the Calciopoli scandal saw their official position changed to seventh and assured them a return to the UEFA Cup. Players such as Daniele Bonera continued to be sold on for money and another new coach, Stefano Pioli, was appointed as the 2006–07 season approached.

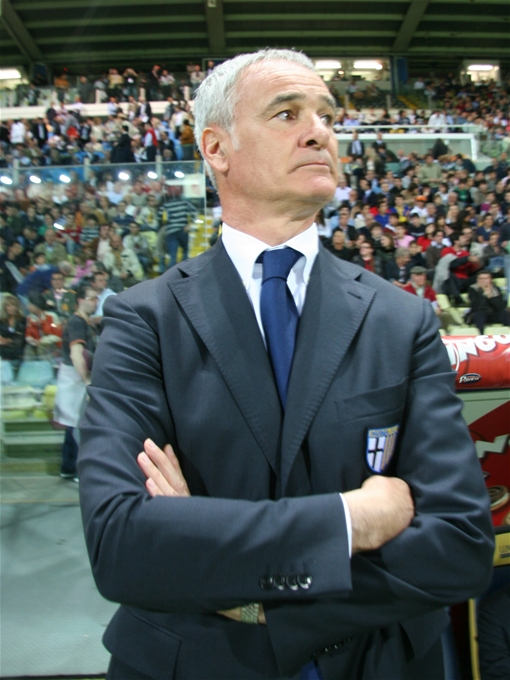
Claudio Ranieri, who saved Parma from relegation in 2007

On 24 January 2007, Tommaso Ghirardi was announced as new owner of Parma FC following a public auction sale following a failed bid from ex-Real Madrid director Lorenzo Sanz the previous year, which failed to meet the then-asking price of €27m. Ghirardi, a 31-year-old entrepreneur and owner of Serie C2 club AC Carpenedolo, also became president of Parma F.C., ending three years of state-controlled management. Having qualifying for the Round of 32 of the 2006–07 UEFA Cup, Parma were eliminated from the competition by S.C. Braga, who prevailed by a single goal to nil in both legs; the home match was played behind closed doors after the Italian Government ruled that Parma's stadium did not meet requirements set out following recent riots in a league match in Sicily. On 12 February, second-last placed Parma fired head coach Pioli and replaced him with Claudio Ranieri who, against overwhelming odds, managed to avoid relegation to Serie B on the final day of the season, before leaving at the end of the season. In the 2007–08 season, Parma again battled with relegation. Three different head coaches (Domenico Di Carlo, Héctor Cúper, and caretaker Andrea Manzo) took charge that season, but none were able to preserve Parma's Serie A status, as they lost 2–0 at home to champions Inter Milan on the final day of the season, Zlatan Ibrahimović eventually sealing their fate and consigning them to Serie B football after eighteen years in the top flight.

== Up and down after Ghirardi's purchase (2008–2015) ==
Parma's stay in Serie B started badly under Luca Cagni, who was sacked six games into the season and replaced by Francesco Guidolin who guided the club to joint top at the half-way mark and a second-place finish, ending the season unbeaten at home and fired on with goals from Alberto Paloschi and Cristiano Lucarelli, finally securing promotion back to Serie A with a 2–2 draw on 16 May 2009 with two games left to play. Parma went on to finish the season in second place, 4 points behind eventual winners Bari. Parma's return to Serie A in 2009–10 started with good form, winning eight of the first sixteen matches and sitting in fourth position before Christmas, as Daniele Galloppa became the first Parma player to represent Italy in over three years, the longest period without Parma representation since Alberto Di Chiara became the first to play for Italy in 1992. Although Parma's form dropped off in the new year, despite the re-signing of fans' favourite Hernán Crespo they did manage to finish eighth in the final standings, narrowly missing out on qualification for the UEFA Europa League, just three points behind rivals Juventus. Head coach Guidolin's contract was not renewed and he left for Udinese, swapping posts with Parma's newly appointed Pasquale Marino in the summer of 2010.

Parma started the 2010–11 season poorly and lay in sixteenth position at the Christmas break despite an unlikely return to form for Hernán Crespo who had scored eight goals, as pressure on Marino from the boardroom grew. However, Marino's time in charge ended on 3 April, when he was sacked by President Tommaso Ghirardi after a disappointing home defeat to rock-bottom Bari, which saw Parma fall within two points of the relegation zone with seven matches to go. His replacement, Franco Colomba, was appointed as a replacement on 5 April, having been out of a job since August, when he left Bologna before the first game of the season. Colomba brought about a dramatic change in fortunes, winning four of the seven games he took charge of, including three consecutive victories against top opposition (Inter Milan, Udinese and Palermo) and the completion of a season double over rivals Juventus in the penultimate game of the season, having celebrated avoiding relegation the weekend before. On 9 January 2012, Ghirardi sacked Colomba and replaced him with Roberto Donadoni following a winless run of six matches that culminated in a 5–0 loss to Inter Milan. Donadoni introduced a 3–5–2 formation that offered more defensive solidity than Colomba's 4–4–2. After a shaky start, Donadoni's side finished the season with 7 consecutive wins, a new club record in Serie A, and an impressive finish in eighth.

The club was declared bankrupt in 2015 restarting from Serie D.

== Another rebirth (2015–present) ==
The re-founded club, S.S.D. Parma Calcio 1913, was formed in July 2015, taking its name from the year of foundation of the predecessor club and beating off competition from a rival to secure a place in the 2015–16 Serie D under article 52 of N.O.I.F. as the representative of Parma. Ex-head coach Nevio Scala was appointed as president and former player Luigi Apolloni was chosen as head coach. In the club's first season, it sold over 9,000 season tickets, more than doubling the Serie D record. They won their first ever game in Serie D 2–1 against Villafranca Veronese, with 10,000 supporters in attendance.
