= 1992 Coppa Italia final =

44th Coppa Italia final
- Event: 1991–92 Coppa Italia
Juventus	Parma
1	2

First leg
Juventus	Parma
1	0
- Date: 7 May 1992
- Venue: Stadio delle Alpi, Turin
- Referee: Rosario Lo Bello
- Attendance: 47,872

Second leg
Parma	Juventus
2	0
- Date: 14 May 1992
- Venue: Stadio Ennio Tardini, Parma
- Referee: Fabio Baldas
- Attendance: 24,471

The 1992 Coppa Italia final was the final of the 1991–92 Coppa Italia, the top cup competition in Italian football. The match was played over two legs on 7 May and 14 May 1992 between Juventus and Parma. The final was won by Parma, who claimed their first Coppa Italia title with a 2–1 aggregate victory.

== First leg ==
7 May 1992
20:30

Juventus	1–0	Parma
Baggio 23' (pen.)	Report

Stadio delle Alpi, Turin
Attendance: 47,872
Referee: Rosario Lo Bello

Juventus	Parma

GK	1	(Italy) Angelo Peruzzi (c)
RB	2	(Italy) Massimo Carrera
CB	6	(Brazil) Júlio César	(yellow card) 73'
LB	3	(Italy) Gianluca Luppi
RM	7	(Germany) Stefan Reuter
CM	4	(Italy) Roberto Galia
CM	5	(Italy) Giancarlo Marocchi
LM	8	(Italy) Antonio Conte		(substituted off) 58'
RF	11	(Italy) Paolo Di Canio
CF	9	(Italy) Salvatore Schillaci		(substituted off) 64'
LF	10	(Italy) Roberto Baggio
Substitutes:
LB	16	(Italy) Luigi De Agostini		(substituted on) 58'
CM	14	(Italy) Eugenio Corini		(substituted on) 64'
Manager:
(Italy) Giovanni Trapattoni

GK	1	(Italy) Marco Ballotta
DF	2	(Italy) Antonio Benarrivo
DF	3	(Italy) Alberto Di Chiara
DF	4	(Italy) Lorenzo Minotti (c)
DF	4	(Italy) Luigi Apolloni
DF	6	(Belgium) Georges Grün
FW	7	(Italy) Alessandro Melli	(yellow card) 45'	(substituted off) 84'
MF	8	(Italy) Daniele Zoratto		(substituted off) 68'
MF	9	(Italy) Marco Osio
MF	10	(Italy) Stefano Cuoghi
FW	11	(Sweden) Tomas Brolin
Substitutes:
MF		(Italy) Tarcisio Catanese		(substituted on) 68'
FW		(Italy) Massimo Agostini		(substituted on) 84'
Manager:
(Italy) Nevio Scala

MATCH OFFICIALS

- Assistant referees:
- Fourth official:

MATCH RULES

- 90 minutes.

== Second leg ==
14 May 1992
20:30

Parma	2–0	Juventus
Melli 45'; Osio 61'	Report

Stadio Ennio Tardini, Parma
Attendance: 24,471
Referee: Fabio Baldas

Parma	Juventus

GK	1	(Italy) Marco Ballotta
DF	2	(Italy) Antonio Benarrivo
DF	3	(Italy) Alberto Di Chiara
DF	4	(Italy) Lorenzo Minotti (c)	(yellow card) 73'
DF	5	(Italy) Luigi Apolloni	(yellow card) 50'
DF	6	(Belgium) Georges Grün
FW	7	(Italy) Alessandro Melli		(substituted off) 85'
MF	8	(Italy) Daniele Zoratto
MF	9	(Italy) Marco Osio		(substituted off) 83'
MF	10	(Italy) Stefano Cuoghi	(yellow card) 64'
FW	11	(Sweden) Tomas Brolin
Substitutes:
MF		(Italy) Ivo Pulga		(substituted on) 83'
FW		(Italy) Massimo Agostini		(substituted on) 85'
Manager:
(Italy) Nevio Scala

GK	1	(Italy) Angelo Peruzzi (c)
RB	2	(Italy) Massimo Carrera		(substituted off) 66'
CB	3	(Italy) Gianluca Luppi	(yellow card) 39'
CB	5	(Germany) Jürgen Kohler	(yellow card) 45'
LB	6	(Italy) Luigi De Agostini	(yellow card) 17'	(substituted off) 73'
RM	7	(Germany) Stefan Reuter	(yellow card) 33'
CM	4	(Italy) Roberto Galia
LM	8	(Italy) Giancarlo Marocchi
RF	11	(Italy) Pierluigi Casiraghi
CF	9	(Italy) Salvatore Schillaci	(yellow card) 19'
LF	10	(Italy) Roberto Baggio
Substitutes:
RF	17	(Italy) Paolo Di Canio		(substituted on) 66'
LM	18	(Italy) Antonio Conte	(red card) 88'	(substituted on) 73'
Manager:
(Italy) Giovanni Trapattoni

MATCH OFFICIALS

- Assistant referees:
- Fourth official:

MATCH RULES

- 90 minutes.

== See also ==
- 1991–92 Juventus FC season
- 1991–92 Parma AC season

Played between same clubs:

- 1995 Coppa Italia final
- 2002 Coppa Italia final
