= Cláudio Taffarel =

Brazilian footballer (born 1966)

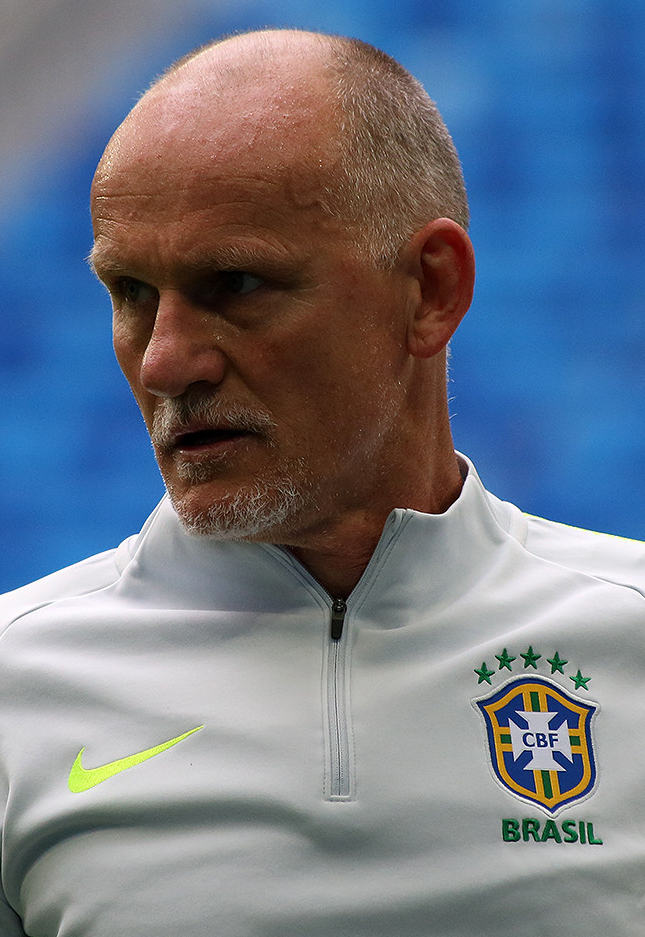
- Taffarel with Brazil in 2018

Personal information
- Full name: Cláudio André Mergen Taffarel
- Date of birth: 8 May 1966 (age 60)
- Place of birth: Santa Rosa, Brazil
- Height: 1.80 m (5 ft 11 in)
- Position: Goalkeeper

Team information
- Current team: Brazil (goalkeeping coach)

Youth career
- 1984–1985: Internacional

Senior career*
Years	Team	Apps	(Gls)
1985–1990	Internacional	73	(0)
1990–1993	Parma	74	(0)
1993–1994	Reggiana	31	(0)
1995–1998	Atlético Mineiro	74	(0)
1998–2001	Galatasaray	89	(0)
2001–2003	Parma	5	(0)
Total		346	(0)

International career
1988–1998	Brazil	101	(0)

Managerial career
- 2014: Galatasaray (interim)
- 2015: Galatasaray (interim)
Medal record
Men's Football
Representing Brazil
FIFA World Cup
Winner	1994 United States
Runner-up	1998 France
Copa América
Winner	1989 Brazil
Winner	1997 Bolivia
Runner-up	1991 Chile
Runner-up	1995 Uruguay
Olympic Games
Silver medal – second place	1988 Seoul	Team
CONCACAF Gold Cup
Third place	1998 United States
FIFA U–20 World Cup
Winner	1985 Soviet Union
South American U-20 Championship
Winner	1985 Paraguay
- * Club domestic league appearances and goals

Cláudio André Mergen Taffarel (Brazilian Portuguese: [ˈklawdʒu tafaˈɾɛw]; born 8 May 1966) is a Brazilian professional football coach and former player who is the goalkeeping coach of the Brazil national team.

A goalkeeper, Taffarel began his senior career in 1985 with Internacional in his native Brazil and then played in Parma, Reggiana, Atlético Mineiro and Galatasaray. He retired in 2003 after a second spell at Parma.

The recipient of more than 100 international caps, Taffarel played a key role in Brazil's victorious 1994 World Cup campaign and also appeared in eight other major international tournaments over the course of one full decade, most notably winning two Copa América titles in 1989 and 1997, as well as a World Cup runners-up finish in 1998. He also won a silver medal at the 1988 Summer Olympics in South Korea.

== Club career ==
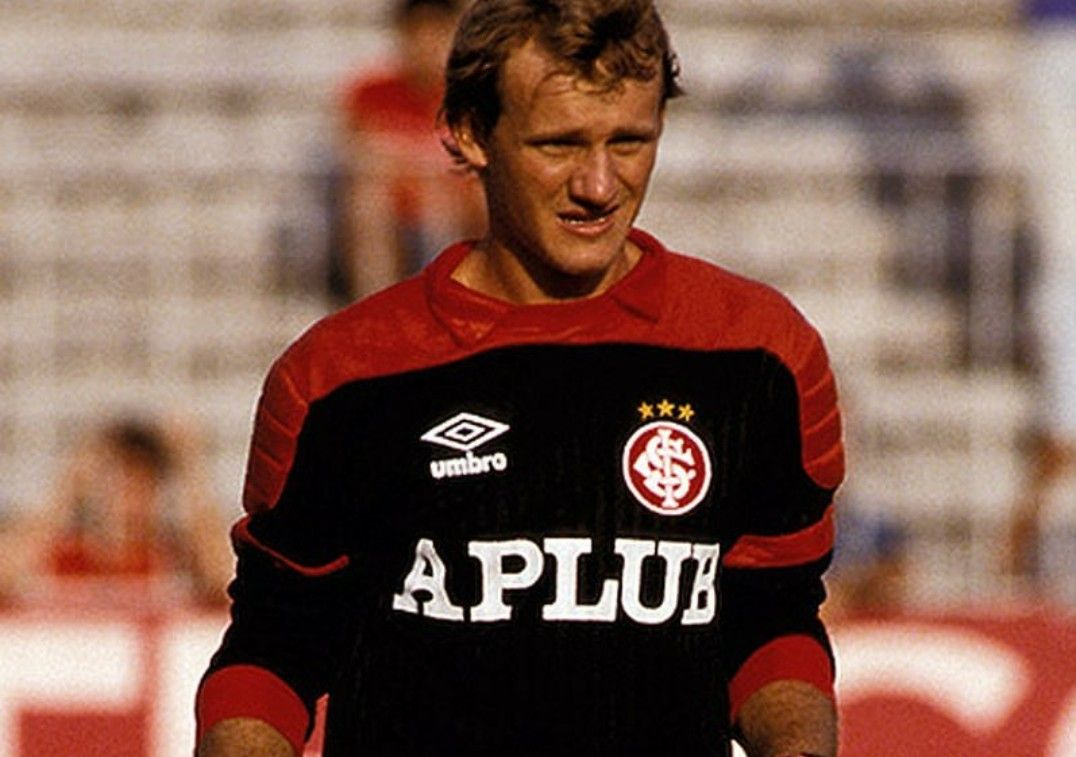
Taffarel playing for Internacional in the 1980s.

Born in Santa Rosa, Rio Grande do Sul with Italian Brazilian ancestry, Taffarel began his career playing for Internacional but only appeared in 14 Série A games during his five-year spell, being however awarded the Golden Ball award for the 1988 season.

In 1990, he played for Parma in Italy, a club which had just been promoted to Serie A for the first time in their history; according to a 2003 article by Andrea Schianchi of La Gazzetta dello Sport, Taffarel's move to Parma was also carried out for commercial reasons, as at the time, Calisto Tanzi, the then–owner of Parmalat – the company that owned the club –, was looking to have the Brazilian goalkeeper become the face of the corporation's new advertising campaign following its recent expansion into Brazil. Taffarel became the first non–Italian goalkeeper to play in Serie A, and proceeded to appear in all 34 league games in the following campaign under manager Nevio Scala, as the Emilia-Romagna side finished in sixth position and qualified to the UEFA Cup. He won the Coppa Italia in 1992 and the Cup Winners' Cup in 1993 during his first spell with the club, although following a series of unconvincing performances, and the regulations at the time that only allowed three non–Italian players in the team's starting XI (with Faustino Asprilla, Tomas Brolin, and Georges Grün usually being selected to start by Scala), he was relegated to the bench over the course of the next two seasons, initially behind Marco Ballotta and later Luca Bucci.

In 1993, Taffarel, now only a back-up at Parma, signed for fellow Serie A team Reggiana, where he was first-choice throughout the following season in a narrow escape from relegation. However, he was subsequently dropped from the first team in 1994, and remained without a professional club in the run up to and following that year's World Cup in the United States, playing instead at amateur level with his local church team, and even featuring as a centre-forward on occasion. Afterwards, he returned to his home country in 1995 and played three years with Atlético Mineiro.

On 24 June 1998, when still appearing for Seleção at 1998 FIFA World Cup tournament in France, Taffarel signed a two-year deal with Galatasaray at Disneyland Paris. Galatasaray paid a transfer fee of around $1.5 million to his former club Atlético Mineiro. At Galatasaray, he won six major trophies during his three-year stint, most notably two Süper Lig titles and the 1999–2000 UEFA Cup and 2000 UEFA Super Cup; in the final of the former competition – a 4–1 penalty shootout victory over Arsenal following a 0–0 draw after 120 minutes – he was chosen as man of the match.

He closed out his career with former club Parma, joining the team in 2001; he mainly featured as a second-choice keeper behind Sébastien Frey during his second spell with the club, but started in both legs of the 2002 Coppa Italia final, which saw Parma triumph over the newly crowned Serie A champions, Juventus. He retired in 2003, after one and a half seasons with the club, at the age of 37, and after having refused an offer from Empoli: his car broke down on the way to sign the contract and finalise the deal, which he later described as a "sign of God".

== International career ==
Taffarel was the starting goalkeeper for Brazil at the 1985 FIFA World Youth Championship hosted by the former USSR, which Brazil won. He then made his senior debut for Brazil on 7 July 1988 in the Australia Bicentenary Gold Cup, playing all four games and conceding two goals as his team won the tournament. He was also in goal for the following year's Copa América, which Brazil also won (during his ten-year international career, he appeared in five editions of the latter tournament, winning the title for a second time in 1997, and collecting runners-up medals in 1991 and 1995). At the 1988 Summer Olympics in Seoul, he won a silver medal, saving three penalties against West Germany in the semi-finals of the tournament: one in regulation time, and two in Brazil's successful shoot-out. He was also a member of the Brazilian team that took part at the 1990 FIFA World Cup in Italy, where Brazil were eliminated in the round of 16 following a 1–0 defeat to rivals and defending champions Argentina, with Taffarel conceding only two goals in total throughout the tournament.

Taffarel was the starter for the nation during the team's victorious 1994 FIFA World Cup campaign in the United States, only allowing one goal in the first round and two in the knock-out phases, excluding two penalty kicks in the final shootout victory against Italy; in the latter match, he stopped Daniele Massaro's penalty in a 3–2 shoot-out victory following a goalless draw after extra-time. Four years later, in France, he helped his national team to a second consecutive World Cup final, which proved to be his final international appearance; on this occasion, however, Brazil lost out 3–0 to the hosts. In the run-up to the final, Taffarel had notably saved two penalties in the team's 4–2 shootout victory over the Netherlands in the semi-finals, following a 1–1 draw after extra-time. He was also a member of the Brazilian side that finished in third place at the 1998 CONCACAF Gold Cup.

In total, Taffarel played 101 times with the Seleção, making him Brazil's most capped goalkeeper of all time, and one of the few Brazilian players to have made at least 100 appearances for the national side. Upon his retirement in 2003, coach Carlos Alberto Parreira offered to arrange a farewell match but the player refused, stating that he was not interested in such fanfare; he did return to play alongside Romário in late 2004 against Mexico, to commemorate the 1994 World Cup victory at the Los Angeles Memorial Coliseum.

== Style of play ==
Regarded as one of the greatest Brazilian goalkeepers of all time, Taffarel was known to be a rational, effective, and generally consistent keeper, with good fundamental goalkeeping technique, who favoured an efficient rather than spectacular playing style. His main attributes were his explosive reflexes, positional sense, and calm composure in goal, as well as his penalty-stopping abilities; due to the muscle power in his legs that he developed while playing beach volleyball in his youth, he was known for his surprising spring and elevation from a standstill position, despite his modest stature, which gave him significant hang time and aided him in stopping penalties. Furthermore, he was known to be quick when coming off his line, and was also highly regarded for his flair and skill with the ball at his feet, and ability to play the ball out from the back, having played as a forward in his youth. Due to his lack of height, however, as well as his poor handling and decision-making, he struggled at times when dealing with crosses, and was not particularly confident or decisive when coming off his line to catch high balls; as such, critical reception of Taffarel was often divided throughout his career. While he drew praise from the Brazilian fans and media for his decisive performances with the Brazil national team, which even earned him the nickname "Saint Taffarel" in the Brazilian media, he also drew criticism at times from Italian pundits over the mental aspect of his game, and his lack of development during his time in Serie A, which made him unreliable and prone to technical errors on occasion, despite his shot-stopping ability and generally high-quality gameplay, as well as his capacity to produce excellent saves. Moreover, his struggles to cope with his nerves are thought to have impeded him from succeeding consistently at the highest level with top European clubs throughout his career, despite his success and reputation. Ahead of the 1998 FIFA World Cup final, Mike Penner of the Los Angeles Times speculated that Taffarel, and the goalkeeping position more broadly, was the "weak link" of an otherwise world class Brazil national side, due to the lack of top goalkeepers in Brazilian football at the time; indeed, prior to the tournament, Reuters had dismissed Taffarel as: "One of around a dozen goalkeepers in Brazil of roughly the same standard." Beyond his playing ability, Taffarel often made a name for himself as a key dressing room personality for his teams.

== Post-retirement ==
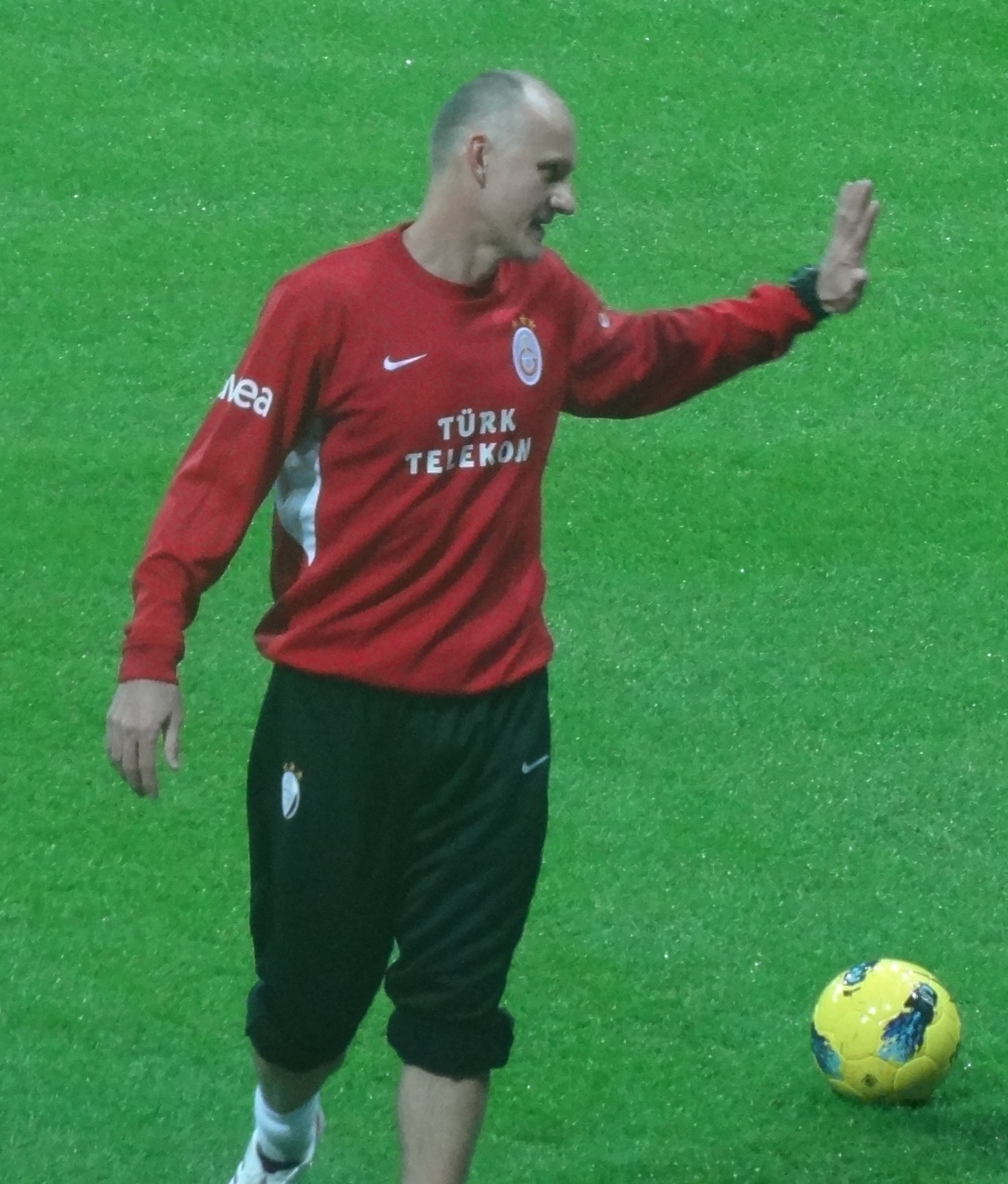
Taffarel with Galatasaray in 2012

Taffarel and his former Atlético Mineiro teammate Paulo Roberto started up a player agency, with the focus mainly on promising youngsters.

During the 1998 World Cup, when the Brazil national team was training at Trois-Sapins stadium in Ozoir-la-Ferrière, a suburb southeast of Paris, the town's mayor proposed renaming the stadium after him.

In 2004, Taffarel rejoined Galatasaray as goalkeeping coach – under former teammate Gheorghe Hagi – returning to the club for the 2011–12 season, again with Fatih Terim as manager. Taffarel had two short spells as interim manager before leaving the Turkish side in 2019.

He worked as a goalkeeper coach for Liverpool, having joined in 2021. He also worked for the Brazil national team, having taken up the role in 2014. He briefly left the role with Brazil at the end of the 2022 FIFA World Cup, but returned to the national team in January 2024 at the request of new Brazil head coach Dorival Júnior. He departed his role with Liverpool in July 2025.

== Personal life ==
Born in Santa Rosa, Rio Grande do Sul, Brazil, Taffarel is of German and Italian descent.

Taffarel is a born-again Christian who has actively shared his faith in numerous venues. He was a member of the Fellowship of Christian Athletes since 1988, and has 17 children, 15 of them adopted.

== Career statistics ==
=== Club ===
Appearances and goals by club, season and competition
Club	Season	League			National cup		Continental		State league		Total	
Club	Season	Division	Apps	Goals	Apps	Goals	Apps	Goals	Apps	Goals	Apps	Goals
Internacional	1985	Série A	0	0	—		—		13	0	13	0
Internacional	1986	Série A	17	0	—		—		0	0	17	0
Internacional	1987	Série A	19	0	—		—		41	0	60	0
Internacional	1988	Série A	22	0	—		—		24	0	46	0
Internacional	1989	Série A	15	0	—		12	0	16	0	43	0
Internacional	1990	Série A	0	0	—		—		7	0	7	0
Internacional	Total		73	0	—		12	0	101	0	186	0
Parma	1990–91	Serie A	34	0	2	0	—		—		36	0
Parma	1991–92	Serie A	34	0	3	0	1	0	—		38	0
Parma	1992–93	Serie A	6	0	1	0	1	0	—		8	0
Parma	Total		74	0	6	0	2	0	—		82	0
Reggiana	1993–94	Serie A	31	0	2	0	—		—		33	0
Atlético Mineiro	1995	Série A	22	0	6	0	8	0	19	0	55	0
Atlético Mineiro	1996	Série A	27	0	4	0	2	0	29	0	62	0
Atlético Mineiro	1997	Série A	25	0	4	0	6	0	17	0	52	0
Atlético Mineiro	1998	Série A	—		3	0	—		6	0	9	0
Atlético Mineiro	Total		74	0	17	0	16	0	71	0	178	0
Galatasaray	1998–99	1.Lig	32	0	8	0	8	0	—		48	0
Galatasaray	1999–2000	1.Lig	30	0	3	0	16	0	—		49	0
Galatasaray	2000–01	1.Lig	27	0	3	0	14	0	—		44	0
Galatasaray	Total		89	0	14	0	38	0	—		141	0
Parma	2001–02	Serie A	5	0	8	0	—		—		13	0
Parma	2002–03	Serie A	0	0	2	0	—		—		2	0
Parma	Total		5	0	10	0	—		—		15	0
Career total			346	0	49	0	68	0	172	0	635	0

=== International ===
Appearances and goals by national team and year
National team	Year	Apps	Goals
Brazil	1988	7	0
Brazil	1989	16	0
Brazil	1990	7	0
Brazil	1991	10	0
Brazil	1992	2	0
Brazil	1993	15	0
Brazil	1994	9	0
Brazil	1995	5	0
Brazil	1996	0	0
Brazil	1997	15	0
Brazil	1998	15	0
Total		101	0

== Honours ==
Parma

- Coppa Italia: 1991–92, 2001–02
- UEFA Cup Winners' Cup: 1992–93

Atlético Mineiro

- Campeonato Mineiro: 1995
- Copa CONMEBOL: 1997

Galatasaray

- Süper Lig: 1998–99, 1999–2000
- Turkish Cup: 1998–99, 1999–2000
- UEFA Cup: 1999–2000
- UEFA Super Cup: 2000

Brazil

- FIFA World Cup: 1994; runner-up 1998
- Copa América: 1989, 1997; runner-up 1991, 1995
- Summer Olympic Games Silver Medal: 1988
- FIFA World Youth Championship: 1985

Individual

- Toulon Tournament Best Goalkeeper: 1987
- Bola de Prata: 1987, 1988
- Bola de Ouro: 1988
- FIFA World Cup All Star Team: 1990 (unofficial)
- FIFA XI: 1998
- Brazilian Football Museum Hall of Fame
- Man of the Match: 2000 UEFA Cup final

== See also ==
- List of footballers with 100 or more caps
