= 1995 Coppa Italia final =

47th Coppa Italia final
- Event: 1994–95 Coppa Italia
Juventus	Parma
3	0

First leg
Juventus	Parma
1	0
- Date: 7 June 1995
- Venue: Stadio delle Alpi, Turin
- Referee: Angelo Amendolia
- Attendance: 33,840

Second leg
Parma	Juventus
0	2
- Date: 11 June 1995
- Venue: Stadio Ennio Tardini, Parma
- Referee: Pierluigi Collina
- Attendance: 23,823

The 1995 Coppa Italia final decided the winner of the 1994–95 Coppa Italia. It was held on 7 and 11 June 1995 between Juventus and Parma. The first leg at the Stadio delle Alpi in Turin was the smallest difference won by Juventus after a goal by Sergio Porrini. The second leg was played at the Stadio Ennio Tardini in Parma, won again by Juventus from another Porrini goal followed by his teammate Fabrizio Ravanelli for a 3–0 aggregate win.

A month earlier, both teams had faced off in the 1995 UEFA Cup Final, in which Parma won 2–1 on aggregate. With Juve having won the 1994–95 Serie A title, they met again in the 1995 Supercoppa Italiana (played at the start of 1996 due to the fixture congestion caused by their deep runs in several competitions), in which the Turin side also came out on top.

== First leg ==
7 June 1995
21:00

Juventus	1–0	Parma
Porrini 10'

Stadio delle Alpi, Turin
Attendance: 33,840
Referee: Angelo Amendolia

Juventus	Parma

GK	1	(Italy) Michelangelo Rampulla		(substituted off) 70'
RB	4	(Italy) Moreno Torricelli
CB	2	(Italy) Ciro Ferrara
CB	5	(Italy) Sergio Porrini
LB	3	(Italy) Alessandro Orlando
RM	7	(Italy) Angelo Di Livio
CM	8	(France) Didier Deschamps		(substituted off) 61'
LM	6	(Portugal) Paulo Sousa	Booked	(substituted off) 82'
RF	9	(Italy) Gianluca Vialli (c)
CF	11	(Italy) Fabrizio Ravanelli
LF	10	(Italy) Alessandro Del Piero
Substitutes:
MF		(Italy) Giancarlo Marocchi		(substituted in) 61'
GK		(Italy) Lorenzo Squizzi		(substituted in) 70'
CM		(Italy) Luca Fusi		(substituted in) 80'
Manager:
(Italy) Marcello Lippi

Parma:
GK	1	(Italy) Luca Bucci
RWB	2	(Italy) Roberto Mussi	Booked
CB	5	(Italy) Luigi Apolloni
CB	6	(Portugal) Fernando Couto
CB	4	(Italy) Lorenzo Minotti (c)
LWB	3	(Italy) Alberto Di Chiara
CM	7	(Italy) Massimo Crippa	Booked
CM	8	(Italy) Dino Baggio		(substituted off) 82'
CM	11	(Italy) Gabriele Pin		(substituted off) 76'
CF	9	(Italy) Marco Branca
CF	10	(Italy) Gianfranco Zola
Substitutes:
MF		(Italy) Stefano Fiore		(substituted in) 76'
FW		(Colombia) Faustino Asprilla		(substituted in) 82'
Manager:
(Italy) Nevio Scala

== Second leg ==
11 June 1995
21:00

Parma	0–2	Juventus
		Porrini 26'; Ravanelli 54'

Stadio Ennio Tardini, Parma
Attendance: 23,823
Referee: Pierluigi Collina

Parma	Juventus

Parma:
GK	1	(Italy) Luca Bucci	Booked
RWB	2	(Italy) Roberto Mussi
CB	5	(Italy) Luigi Apolloni	(yellow card) 3' (yellow-red card) 86'
CB	6	(Portugal) Fernando Couto	Booked	(substituted off) 46'
CB	4	(Italy) Lorenzo Minotti (c)
LWB	3	(Italy) Alberto Di Chiara
CM	7	(Italy) Massimo Crippa
CM	8	(Italy) Dino Baggio
CM	11	(Italy) Stefano Fiore		(substituted off) 55'
CF	9	(Italy) Marco Branca
CF	10	(Italy) Gianfranco Zola	Booked
Substitutes:
FW	16	(Colombia) Faustino Asprilla		(substituted in) 46'
MF		(Argentina) Roberto Sensini		(substituted in) 55'
Manager:
(Italy) Nevio Scala

Juventus:
GK	1	(Italy) Michelangelo Rampulla
RB	3	(Italy) Moreno Torricelli
CB	2	(Italy) Ciro Ferrara
CB	5	(Italy) Sergio Porrini	Booked
LB	4	(Italy) Giancarlo Marocchi	Booked	(substituted off) 68'
RM	7	(Italy) Angelo Di Livio
CM	8	(France) Didier Deschamps
LM	6	(Italy) Alessio Tacchinardi
RF	9	(Italy) Gianluca Vialli (c)		(substituted off) 30'
CF	11	(Italy) Fabrizio Ravanelli
LF	10	(Italy) Alessandro Del Piero
Substitutes:
MF		(Italy) Antonio Conte		(substituted in) 68'
DF	15	(Italy) Alessandro Orlando		(substituted in) 30'
Manager:
(Italy) Marcello Lippi

== See also ==
- 1994–95 Juventus FC season
- 1994–95 Parma AC season

Played between same clubs:

- 1992 Coppa Italia final
- 2002 Coppa Italia final
