= 2002 Coppa Italia final =

54th Coppa Italia final
- Event: 2001–02 Coppa Italia
Juventus	Parma
2	2
- Parma won on the away goals rule

First leg
Juventus	Parma
2	1
- Date: 25 April 2002
- Venue: Stadio delle Alpi, Turin
- Referee: Pierluigi Collina
- Attendance: 35,874

Second leg
Parma	Juventus
1	0
- Date: 10 May 2002
- Venue: Stadio Ennio Tardini, Parma
- Referee: Gianluca Paparesta
- Attendance: 26,864

The 2002 Coppa Italia final was the final of the 2001–02 Coppa Italia, the top cup competition in Italian football. The match was played over two legs on 25 April and 10 May 2002 between Juventus and Parma. This was the third Coppa Italia final between these two clubs, after the 1992 and 1995 finals, and the fifth of six major finals between the two sides. The final was won by Parma, who claimed their third Coppa Italia title with an away goals victory after the aggregate score was level at 2–2.

== First leg ==
25 April 2002
20:50

Juventus	2–1	Parma
Amoruso 5' (pen.); Zalayeta 57'		Nakata 90'

Stadio delle Alpi, Turin
Attendance: 35,874
Referee: Pierluigi Collina

Juventus	Parma

GK	22	(Uruguay) Fabián Carini
RB	15	(Italy) Alessandro Birindelli
CB	21	(France) Lilian Thuram
CB	5	(Croatia) Igor Tudor		(substituted off) 46'
LB	3	(Italy) Michele Paramatti
RM	11	(Czech Republic) Pavel Nedvěd		(substituted off) 46'
CM	14	(Italy) Cristian Zenoni
CM	26	(Netherlands) Edgar Davids		(substituted off) 58'
LM	8	(Italy) Antonio Conte (c)
FW	25	(Uruguay) Marcelo Zalayeta
FW	27	(Italy) Nicola Amoruso
Substitutes:
GK	1	(Italy) Gianluigi Buffon
CB	2	(Italy) Ciro Ferrara
CB	4	(Uruguay) Paolo Montero		(substituted on) 46'
LF	10	(Italy) Alessandro Del Piero
RF	17	(France) David Trezeguet
RM	19	(Italy) Gianluca Zambrotta		(substituted on) 46'
CM	20	(Italy) Alessio Tacchinardi	Booked	(substituted on) 58'
Manager:
(Italy) Marcello Lippi

GK	30	(Brazil) Claudio Taffarel
CB	3	(Italy) Antonio Benarrivo	Booked
CB	74	(France) Martin Djetou		(substituted off) 46'
CB	7	(Italy) Luigi Sartor	Booked
RM	23	(Italy) Aimo Diana
CM	4	(Ghana) Stephen Appiah		(substituted off) 74'
CM	8	(France) Sabri Lamouchi
LM	32	(Italy) Marco Marchionni
AM	14	(France) Alain Boghossian
AM	18	(France) Johan Micoud
FW	11	(Turkey) Hakan Şükür		(substituted off) 58'
Substitutes:
GK	1	(France) Sébastien Frey
RM	10	(Japan) Hidetoshi Nakata		(substituted on) 74'
CM	13	(Italy) Giampiero Maini
RB	15	(Belarus) Sergei Gurenko		(substituted on) 46'
LB	16	(Brazil) Júnior
CB	21	(Italy) Matteo Ferrari
FW	22	(Italy) Emiliano Bonazzoli		(substituted on) 58'
Manager:
(Italy) Pietro Carmignani

MATCH OFFICIALS

- Assistant referees:
- Fourth official:

MATCH RULES

- 90 minutes.
- Seven named substitutes.
- Maximum of 3 substitutions.

== Second leg ==
10 May 2002
20:50

Parma	1–0	Juventus
Júnior 3'

Stadio Ennio Tardini, Parma
Attendance: 26,864
Referee: Gianluca Paparesta

Parma	Juventus

GK	30	(Brazil) Claudio Taffarel
CB	3	(Italy) Antonio Benarrivo
CB	6	(Argentina) Néstor Sensini
CB	7	(Italy) Luigi Sartor		(substituted off) 87'
RM	23	(Italy) Aimo Diana	Booked
CM	8	(France) Sabri Lamouchi
CM	25	(Argentina) Matías Almeyda	Booked
LM	16	(Brazil) Júnior
AM	10	(Japan) Hidetoshi Nakata		(substituted off) 85'
AM	18	(France) Johan Micoud		(substituted off) 82'
CF	20	(Italy) Marco Di Vaio
Substitutes:
GK	1	(France) Sébastien Frey
CM	4	(Ghana) Stephen Appiah		(substituted on) 85'
FW	10	(Italy) Gaetano Grieco
CM	13	(Italy) Giampiero Maini
RB	15	(Belarus) Sergei Gurenko
CB	21	(Italy) Matteo Ferrari		(substituted on) 87'
FW	22	(Italy) Emiliano Bonazzoli		(substituted on) 82'
Manager:
(Italy) Pietro Carmignani

GK	22	(Uruguay) Fabián Carini
RB	15	(Italy) Alessandro Birindelli		(substituted off) 46'
CB	2	(Italy) Ciro Ferrara	Booked
CB	4	(Uruguay) Paolo Montero
LB	3	(Italy) Michele Paramatti
RM	19	(Italy) Gianluca Zambrotta
CM	14	(Italy) Cristian Zenoni
CM	20	(Italy) Alessio Tacchinardi	Booked
LM	8	(Italy) Antonio Conte (c)
RF	27	(Italy) Nicola Amoruso	Booked	(substituted off) 56'
LF	25	(Uruguay) Marcelo Zalayeta		(substituted off) 72'
Substitutes:
GK	1	(Italy) Gianluigi Buffon
RF	9	(Chile) Marcelo Salas		(substituted on) 72'
LF	10	(Italy) Alessandro Del Piero		(substituted on) 46'
RB	13	(Italy) Mark Iuliano
RF	17	(France) David Trezeguet		(substituted on) 56'
RB	21	(France) Lilian Thuram
CM	26	(Netherlands) Edgar Davids
Manager:
(Italy) Marcello Lippi

MATCH OFFICIALS

- Assistant referees:
- Fourth official:

MATCH RULES

- 90 minutes.
- Seven named substitutes.
- Maximum of 3 substitutions.
- If the scores are level at full-time, the winner is decided on the away goals rule.
- If the scores are still level, 30 minutes of extra time is played.
- If the scores remain level after extra time, there is a penalty shoot-out.

== See also ==
- 2001–02 Juventus FC season
- 2001–02 Parma AC season
