= Pierluigi Collina =

Italian football referee (born 1960)

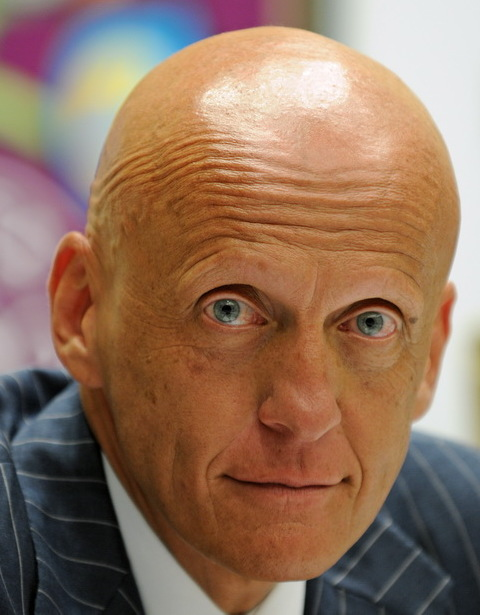
- Collina in 2010
- Born: 13 February 1960 (age 66); Bologna, Italy
- Other occupation: FIFA Referee Committee Chairman

Domestic
Years	League	Role
1988–1991	Serie C2	Referee
1988–1991	Serie C1	Referee
1991–2005	Serie B	Referee
1991–2005	Serie A	Referee
1992–2006	Coppa Italia	Referee

International
Years	League	Role
1995–2005	FIFA listed	Referee

Pierluigi Collina (Note: Italian pronunciation: [ˌpjɛrluˈiːdʒi kolˈliːna]) (born 13 February 1960) is an Italian former football referee. Widely regarded by pundits as one of the greatest referees of all time, he was named "The World's Best Referee" by the International Federation of Football History & Statistics a record six consecutive times from 1998 to 2003, and was named the best referee of all time by the same organisation, as well as by France Football, in 2020.

Collina is still involved in football as an unpaid consultant to the Italian Football Referees Association (AIA), the Head of Referees for the Football Federation of Ukraine since 2010, a member of the UEFA Referees Committee, and Chairman of the FIFA referees committee.

== Refereeing career ==
Collina was born in Bologna and attended the University of Bologna, graduating with a degree in economics in 1984. During his teenage years, he played as a centre-back for a local team, but was persuaded in 1977 to take a referee's course, where it was discovered that he had a particular aptitude for the job. Within three years he was officiating at the highest level of regional matches, while also completing his compulsory military service. In 1988, he progressed more rapidly than normal to the national third division, Serie C1 and Serie C2. After three seasons, he was promoted to officiating Serie B and Serie A matches in 1991.

Around this time, at the age of 26, Collina developed a severe form of alopecia, resulting in the permanent loss of all his facial hair, giving him his distinctive bald appearance and earning the nickname Kojak. He later came to be known as the "Ice-cool Italian," or as the "Iron Man," in the media, earning a reputation as a "strict" but "fair" referee, with a decisive and charismatic temperament, and self-control; he was often known for booking players who attempted to confront him. He soon came to be regarded as one of the best referees in Italy, and later, the world.

In 1995, he took charge of the second leg of the Coppa Italia final between Parma and Juventus; this was the first of four Coppa Italia finals he officiated, with his other appearances occurring in 2002, 2004, and 2005. That same year, after officiating at 43 Serie A matches, he was placed on FIFA's International Referees List. He was allocated five matches at the 1996 Olympic Games, including the final between Nigeria and Argentina. He refereed the 1999 UEFA Champions League final between Bayern Munich and Manchester United; he cited this as his most memorable game because of the cheers at the end, which he described as a "lions' roar".

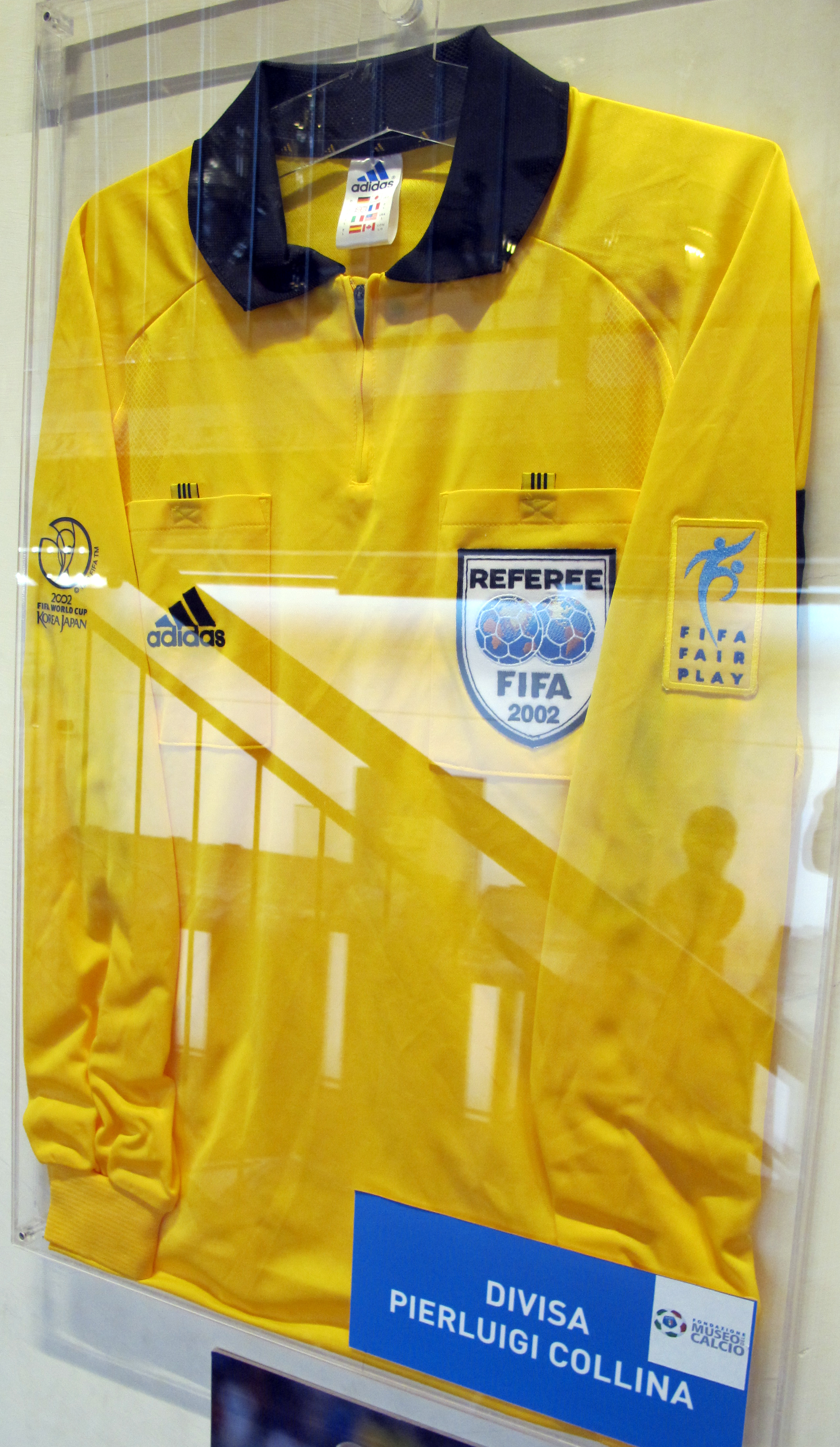
Collina's referee kit worn at the 2002 FIFA World Cup final

Collina served as a referee at the 1998 FIFA World Cup; he took charge of two group matches: those between hosts France and Denmark, and Netherlands and Belgium. He also refereed at UEFA Euro 2000, where he was voted the best referee of the tournament, and took charge of the Group D match between co-hosts the Netherlands and Czech Republic (sending off Radoslav Látal for dissent, who had been substituted, after awarding a penalty to the co-hosts in the final minute, which was converted by Frank de Boer for the only goal of the game), and the Group A match between England and defending champions Germany (1–0), as well as the quarter-final between Spain and eventual champions France (1–2, with France winning the match on a golden goal in extra-time).

Collina also refereed at the 2002 FIFA World Cup, where he officiated the Group F match between Argentina and England, and the round of 16 match between co-hosts Japan and Turkey; in a tournament marked by several controversial refereeing decisions and errors, he was praised by pundits for his performance throughout the competition, in particular in the latter second round match. However, he also awarded a controversial decisive penalty in the aforementioned group match, for an alleged foul on Michael Owen by Mauricio Pochettino, which David Beckham converted for the only goal of the game. In June 2002, Collina reached the pinnacle of his career, when he was chosen to officiate the World Cup final, between Brazil and Germany. Prior to the game, Germany's Oliver Kahn told the Irish Times: "Collina is a world-class referee, there's no doubt about that, but he doesn't bring luck, does he?" Kahn was referring to two previous high-profile matches that Collina had refereed which involved Kahn: the aforementioned 1999 UEFA Champions League final, a 2–1 defeat for Bayern; and Germany's 5–1 defeat against England in Munich in September 2001, in a qualification match for the 2002 World Cup. Kahn's luck did not change in the final, and Germany lost 2–0 to the Brazilian side.

Collina took charge of two consecutive Supercoppa Italiana finals in 2002 and 2003, his only two appearances in the competition. He refereed the 2004 UEFA Cup final between Valencia and Marseille, sending off Fabien Barthez in first-half stoppage time. UEFA Euro 2004 was his last major international tournament, as in February 2005, he reached the mandatory retirement age; he refereed the opening match between hosts Portugal and eventual champions Greece, as well as the semi-final between Greece and Czech Republic, his final international tournament match. His last international match was Portugal against Slovakia on 4 June 2005, a 2006 FIFA World Cup qualifier at Estádio da Luz in Lisbon.

The FIGC raised its mandatory retirement age to 46 in order to accommodate Collina for a further season. However, a dispute emerged between the federation and Collina early in August 2005, following his decision to sign a sponsorship deal with Opel (also advertising for Vauxhall Motors in the United Kingdom – both were owned by General Motors at the time). As Opel was also a sponsor of Serie A club A.C. Milan, the deal was seen as a conflict of interest and Collina was not allowed to referee top-flight matches in Italy. In response, he handed in his resignation, effectively ending his career. The Italian Referees Association then attempted to reject his resignation, but Collina persisted with his retirement from the league.

Collina attracted the ire of Luciano Moggi, the Juventus executive and chief instigator of the 2006 Italian football scandal. Collina was one of the referees that Moggi attempted to have punished for decisions that were made against Juventus. In an intercepted phone call, Moggi claimed that Collina and his colleague Roberto Rosetti were too "objective" and should be "punished" for it. As a result, he and Rosetti were two of the few referees that emerged unscathed from the scandal.

After retiring from Serie A, Collina refereed the Soccer Aid matches for charity in May 2006 and September 2008. During the latter of these games, Collina was involved in an awkward fall and was stretchered off after 21 minutes of play. He later refereed the first half of the 2010 Soccer Aid match.

He came out of retirement to officiate a third-round Champions League qualifier between Everton and Villarreal on 24 August 2005 when he wrongly disallowed an Everton goal. He retired again soon after the game. In total, he officiated 240 matches in the Italian Serie A, 109 international matches, and 467 matches across all competitions throughout his career.

== Later career ==
Collina served as the chief designator of the Italian Football Referees Association (AIA) for Serie A and Serie B from 2007 until 2010.

Collina was appointed head of referees for the Football Federation of Ukraine since 2010. His work in this position is criticised by national referees who disapprove of his lack of involvement in Ukrainian football (spending not more than two weeks per year in Ukraine) and possible tolerance towards corruption in the Ukrainian national football association.

Collina became the UEFA chief of referees in 2010. He held the role until he stepped down in 2018.

Collina became the chairman of the FIFA referee committee in 2017. In this position, Collina most notably selects, evaluates, and appoints the referee crews for FIFA tournaments including the World Cup.

He was involved in the introduction and evaluation of the video assistant referee system for the 2018 World Cup. During the tournament he pointed out the system's effectiveness and later commented positively on its application.

== Personal life ==
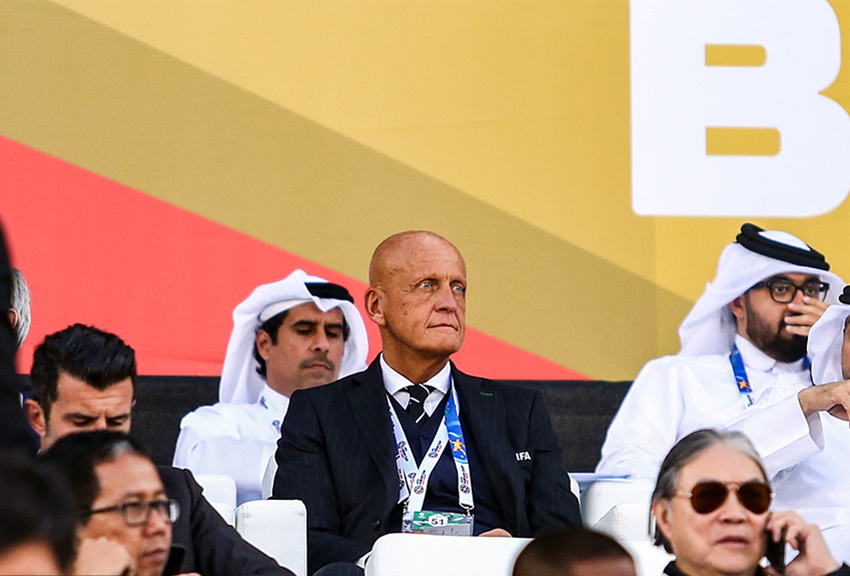
Collina during the 2019 AFC Asian Cup Final between Japan and Qatar

In 1988, Collina met his wife Gianna in Versilia. After living together almost from their meeting, they moved to the coastal town of Viareggio. Since their marriage, the couple have had two daughters. In 2003, Collina published his autobiography, My Rules of the Game (Le Mie Regole del Gioco). In August 2005, after his retirement, he concentrated on his own business, as a financial advisor. Today he lives in Forte dei Marmi.

After refereeing the Second Round match between Japan and Turkey at the 2002 FIFA World Cup, Collina became famous in Japan, and appeared in a television advert for frozen takoyaki products. He is also very popular in Turkey, as no Turkish team, national or club, lost a game with him in charge.

Although Collina is closely identified with football, his favourite sports club plays basketball. He is a lifelong supporter of local club Fortitudo Bologna. On 25 January 2010, Collina participated in a special match for supporting victims of the earthquake in Haiti between a team called "Friends of Zidane and Ronaldo" and Benfica in Lisbon.

== In popular culture ==
=== Music ===
In July 2002, he appeared in cartoon form in George Michael's video "Shoot the Dog".

=== Advertising ===
In 2003, Collina appeared in an advert of a Turkish GSM operator, Aria, due to his popularity in Turkey. In December 2004, he starred in a commercial for MB Pivo in Serbia, alongside Lazar Ristovski. His quote in Serbian "Nema cekaj Lazo, daj MB pivo" (I can't wait no longer Laza, give me MB beer) is famous in Serbia. He appeared in another MB Pivo advert two years later.

Collina's easily-recognisable face (to followers of football) also led to his appearance in an advertising campaign for the Opel Vectra and Signum during the 2006 World Cup. He also appeared in adverts for MasterCard and Adidas during the tournament.

=== Video games ===
Collina was chosen as the cover figure for the football video games Pro Evolution Soccer 3 and Pro Evolution Soccer 4, appearing alongside compatriot Francesco Totti and Thierry Henry for the latter. This was unusual, as football games had come to almost exclusively feature only players and managers on their covers, and he did not feature in either game; this was the first time a referee had featured on the cover of a football video game. In addition, he featured as an "unlockable" referee in the rival EA Sports game FIFA Football 2005, released shortly before Pro Evolution Soccer 4.

== Major matches refereed ==
Date	Match	Tournament	Ref
3 August 1996	Nigeria vs Argentina (3–2)	1996 FIFA Men's Olympic Football Tournament Final	
26 May 1999	Manchester United vs Bayern Munich (2–1)	1999 UEFA Champions League final	
30 June 2002	Germany vs Brazil (0–2)	2002 FIFA World Cup final	
19 May 2004	Valencia vs Marseille (2–0)	2004 UEFA Cup final	

== Honours ==
- IFFHS World's Best Referee: 1998, 1999, 2000, 2001, 2002, 2003
- IFFHS All Time World's Best Referee: 1987–2020
- Honorary degree: Doctor of Science (2004), awarded by Hull University "for his contribution to the world of sport"
- Serie A Referee of the Year: 1997, 1998, 2000, 2002, 2003, 2004, 2005
- Italian Football Hall of Fame: 2011
- Dattilo Award for Best National Referee: 1997
- Giovanni Mauro Award for Best Italian International Referee of the Season: 1999

Sporting positions (Italy) Pierluigi Collina
Preceded by (Colombia) José Torres Cadena	Men's Olympic Football Tournament final referee 1996	Succeeded by (Mexico) Felipe Ramos Rizo
Preceded by (Germany) Hellmut Krug; 1998	UEFA Champions League final referee 1999	Succeeded by (Italy) Stefano Braschi; 2000
Preceded by (Morocco) Said Belqola; 1998	FIFA World Cup final referee 2002	Succeeded by (Argentina) Horacio Elizondo; 2006
Preceded by (Slovakia) Ľuboš Micheľ; 2003	UEFA Cup final referee 2004	Succeeded by (England) Graham Poll; 2005
