= Georges Grün =

Belgian footballer

- Grün with Parma in 1992

Personal information
- Full name: Georges Serge Grün
- Date of birth: 25 January 1962 (age 64)
- Place of birth: Schaerbeek, Belgium
- Height: 1.84 m (6 ft 1/2 in)
- Position: Defender

Senior career*
Years	Team	Apps	(Gls)
1982–1990	Anderlecht	212	(27)
1990–1994	Parma	109	(9)
1994–1996	Anderlecht	46	(4)
1996–1997	Reggiana	22	(0)
Total		389	(40)

International career
1984–1995	Belgium	77	(6)
- * Club domestic league appearances and goals

Georges Serge Grün (born 25 January 1962) is a retired Belgian football defender, who currently works as a television presenter for the UEFA Champions League matches at RTL TVI.

== Club career ==
Grün started his career with Anderlecht in Belgium, where he spent eight seasons, winning the UEFA Cup in 1983, as well as three consecutive Belgian First Division titles between 1984 and 1987, among other trophies; he also reached another UEFA Cup final with the club in 1984, where they lost out to English side Tottenham, however. Grün joined Italian club Parma in 1990. During his time with the club, he established himself as one of the best defenders in Serie A, winning the Coppa Italia in 1992, and the Cup Winners' Cup in 1993 under manager Nevio Scala. Following a series of injury struggles during the 1993–94 season, however, he returned to his former club in 1994. In 1996, he returned to Italy once again, to play for Reggiana; however, he was no longer paid by the club between February and May 1997, and retired at the end of the 1996–97 season.

== International career ==
Grün made his international debut in a 2–0 win against Yugoslavia at UEFA Euro 1984, on 13 June, marking the occasion with a goal. He is most famous in his home country for scoring the away goal that qualified Belgium at the expense of their neighbours Netherlands in the 1986 World Cup qualifying rounds. Belgium would go on to a very respectable fourth-place finish. He played in three FIFA World Cups for the Belgium national football team (1986, 1990 and 1994). He made his World Cup debut against Mexico on 3 June 1986. Grün is the sixth–most–capped player for Belgium with 77 appearances between 1984 and 1995, also scoring six goals.

== Style of play ==
Usually a defender, Grün was capable of playing both as a man-marking centre-back, or stopper, and as a sweeper, due to his elegance, as well as his ability carry the ball out from the back and advance into midfield, or play it out on the ground, which enabled him to start attacking plays with his passing after winning back possession. He was even deployed as a defensive midfielder in front of the back-line on occasion.

== Career statistics ==
Appearances and goals by club, season and competition
Club	Season	League			National cup (Note: Includes Belgian Cup, Coppa Italia)		Europe		Other		Total	
Club	Season	Division	Apps	Goals	Apps	Goals	Apps	Goals	Apps	Goals	Apps	Goals
Anderlecht	1982–83	First Division	1	0	1	0	0 (Note: Appearances in UEFA Cup)	0	—		2	0
Anderlecht	1983–84	First Division	29	3	2	0	10	0	—		41	3
Anderlecht	1984–85	First Division	30	4	5	1	6	0	—		41	5
Anderlecht	1985–86	First Division	31	5	2	1	5 (Note: Appearances in Europacup I)	1	3 (Note: 1 Appearance in Belgian Super Cup, 2 in Belgian Championship play-off)	0	41	7
Anderlecht	1986–87	First Division	32	5	6	1	6	0	1 (Note: Appearances in Belgian Super Cup)	0	45	6
Anderlecht	1987–88	First Division	33	2	9	3	5	1	—		47	6
Anderlecht	1988–89	First Division	30	4	8	2	4 (Note: Appearances in EuropaCup II)	0	—		42	6
Anderlecht	1989–90	First Division	23	4	6	0	7	0	—		36	4
Anderlecht	Total		209	27	39	8	43	2	4	0	295	37
Parma	1990–91	Serie A	33	2	2	0	—		—		35	2
Parma	1991–92	Serie A	33	4	8	1	2	0	—		43	5
Parma	1992–93	Serie A	27	2	3	0	8	1	—		38	3
Parma	1993–94	Serie A	16	1	1	0	4	0	—		21	1
Parma	Total		109	9	14	1	14	1	—		137	11
Anderlecht	1994–95	First Division	16	3	4	0	—		—		20	3
Anderlecht	1995–96	First Division	22	1	1	0	—		2 (Note: Appearances in UEFA Champions League qualifying round)	0	25	1
Anderlecht	Total		38	4	5	0	—		2	0	45	4
Reggiana	1996–97	Serie A	23	0	2	0	—		—		25	0
Career total			379	40	60	9	57	3	6	0	502	52

Appearances and goals by national team and year
National team	Year	Apps	Goals
Belgium	1984	7	1
Belgium	1985	5	1
Belgium	1986	12	0
Belgium	1987	7	0
Belgium	1988	6	1
Belgium	1989	5	0
Belgium	1990	8	0
Belgium	1991	7	0
Belgium	1992	6	0
Belgium	1993	4	0
Belgium	1994	5	1
Belgium	1995	5	2
Total		77	6

List of international goals scored by Georges Grün
No.	Cap	Date	Venue	Opponent	Score	Result	Competition
1	1	13 June 1984	Stade Félix Bollaert, Lens, France	Yugoslavia	2–0	2–0	UEFA Euro 1984
2	11	16 October 1985	De Kuip, Rotterdam, Netherlands	Netherlands	1–2	1–2	1986 World Cup qualification
3	32	19 January 1988	National Stadium, Ramat Gan, Israel	Israel	3–0	3–2	Friendly
4	72	2 July 1994	Soldier Field, Chicago, United States	Germany	1–1	2–3	1994 World Cup Round of 16
5	75	7 June 1995	Gradski Stadion, Skopje, Macedonia	Macedonia	1–0	5–0	Euro 1996 qualification
6	76	6 September 1995	Heysel Stadium, Brussels, Belgium	Denmark	1–2	1–3	Euro 1996 qualification

== Honours ==
=== Player ===
Anderlecht

- Belgian First Division: 1980–81, 1984–85, 1985–86, 1986–87
- Belgian Cup: 1987–88, 1988–89
- Belgian Supercup: 1985, 1987
- UEFA Cup: 1982–83 (winners), 1983–84 (runners-up)
- European Cup Winners' Cup: 1989–90 (runners-up)
- Jules Pappaert Cup: 1983, 1985
- Bruges Matins: 1985, 1988

Parma

- Coppa Italia: 1991–92
- European Cup Winners' Cup: 1992–93 (winners), 1993–94 (runners-up)
- European Super Cup: 1993

=== International ===
Belgium

- FIFA World Cup: 1986 (fourth place)

=== Individual ===
- Ballon d'Or nomination: 1993
- DH The Best RSC Anderlecht Team Ever (2020)
- IFFHS All Time Belgium Dream Team (2021)
