= Alessandro Orlando =

Italian footballer (born 1970)

Personal information
- Date of birth: 1 June 1970 (age 56)
- Place of birth: Udine, Italy
- Height: 1.72 m (5 ft 7 1/2 in)
- Position: Defender

Senior career*
Years	Team	Apps	(Gls)
1987–1991	Udinese	33	(0)
1989–1990	→ Parma (loan)	13	(1)
1991–1992	Sampdoria	14	(1)
1992–1993	Udinese	29	(0)
1993–1994	Milan	15	(0)
1994–1995	Juventus	13	(0)
1995–1996	Fiorentina	6	(1)
1996–1998	Udinese	24	(0)
1998–2000	Treviso	50	(4)
2000–2001	Cagliari	8	(0)
2001–2003	Padova	42	(0)
2003–2004	Cologna Veneta	9	(0)
2004–2007	Tamai	62	(9)
- * Club domestic league appearances and goals

Alessandro Orlando (born 1 June 1970) is an Italian former professional footballer who played a defender.

He played as a left-footed left back.

Although he was often a reserve player at Milan and Juventus, Orlando is one of the six players to win the Serie A title in two successive years with different clubs, winning the 1993–94 Serie A title with Milan, and the 1994–95 Serie A title with Juventus; the other five are Giovanni Ferrari, Riccardo Toros, Eraldo Mancin, Roberto Baggio, and Andrea Pirlo.

== Club career ==
=== Early career ===
After beginning his career in the Udinese Youth side, Orlando made 3 appearances in the Udinese senior side during the 1987–88 and the 1988–89 Serie B seasons. He was subsequently loaned to Parma, making 13 appearances and scoring a goal, also managing Serie A promotion during the 1989–90 season. At the end of his loan contract, he returned to Udinese making 30 appearances in Serie B.

He began to draw attention from larger Serie A clubs, and during the summer of 1991, he was purchased by Sampdoria. He made his Serie A debut with the club on 1 September 1991, in a 3–2 away defeat to Cagliari, although he was unable to break into the starting line-up, making 14 appearances in Serie A, and scoring 1 goal in a home victory over Parma on 1 March 1992, winning the 1991 Supercoppa Italiana with the club. He also made 5 appearances in the UEFA Champions League, as Sampdoria went on to reach the final, only to be defeated by Johan Cruyff's Barcelona "Dream Team". The next season, he returned to his former club, Udinese, who had just achieved promotion to Serie A, making 29 appearances throughout the season.

=== Success with Milan, Juventus and Fiorentina ===
In 1993, Orlando was purchased by Italian and European giants AC Milan for 3.2 billion Lit. With the club, he made 15 appearances in Serie A under manager Fabio Capello, and 6 in the UEFA Champions League, as Milan went on to win both competitions, as well as the Supercoppa Italiana; he notably managed a goal in the Champions League, scoring in Milan's 6–0 away victory over FC Copenhagen. Orlando also made 4 appearances in the Coppa Italia that season for Milan, making 25 appearances in total in all competitions.

He began the following season with Milan, but was sold to Juventus at the end of the transfer window in exchange for creative forward and attacking midfielder Paolo Di Canio. Orlando made 13 appearances for the Turin club in Serie A that season, serving as a back-up to Robert Jarni, as he managed to win his second consecutive Serie A title. He also managed to capture the Coppa Italia with Juventus that season, making five appearances; Juventus also went on to reach the 1995 UEFA Cup Final, only to be defeated by Parma. Despite his success, his inability to break into the starting line-up yet again led to his transfer to Fiorentina, where he appeared even less frequently than in previous seasons. He made only seven appearances in Serie A with the Florentine club that season, and one more in the Coppa Italia, a trophy which Fiorentina would go on to win.

=== Return to Udinese and later career ===
Orlando returned to Udinese for the 1996–97 season, where he made 22 appearances, helping the club to a fifth-place finish in Serie A. He was sold to newly promoted club Treviso in Serie B the following season, after making two appearances with Udinese. He spent two seasons with Treviso in Serie B, scoring 5 goals in 50 appearances. In the summer of 2000, he moved to Cagliari, where he only made eight appearances throughout his only season at the club, later moving to Padova in Serie C1. He played two seasons with the club, making 42 appearances, without scoring a goal. He subsequently moved to Pordenone and later Cologna Veneta. In 2004, he was signed by Serie D club Tamai, where he spent three seasons, before spending the final season of his career with Manzanese, where he retired after the 2007–08 season.

In total he made 102 career appearances In Serie A, scoring 1 goal, and 104 appearances in Serie B, scoring 5 goals.

== International career ==
Although Orlando never appeared for the Italy senior side, he made one appearance with the Italy under-21 side on 29 January 1992, in an away fixture against Greece. He represented Italy at the 1992 Summer Olympics, although he never made appearance throughout the tournament, only playing in the pre-olympic friendly against Egypt.

== Coaching career ==
In 2008, Orlando was hired as a player-manager for A.S.D. Flumiganio, a lower-division team in the Promozione League in Friuli-Venezia Giulia. In June 2013, after his fifth season, he left the club. Starting from the 2013–14 season, he was named player-manager of the Friulian Promozione side A.S.D. Svegliano.

== Honours ==
=== Club ===
Sampdoria

- Supercoppa Italiana: 1991.

A.C. Milan

- Serie A: 1993–94.
- Supercoppa Italiana: 1994.
- UEFA Champions League: 1993–94.

Juventus

- Serie A: 1994–95.
- Coppa Italia: 1994–95.

Fiorentina

- Coppa Italia: 1995–96.
