= Stefano Cuoghi =

Italian footballer and coach

Personal information
- Date of birth: 8 August 1959 (age 67)
- Place of birth: Modena, Italy
- Height: 1.76 m (5 ft 9 1/2 in)
- Position: Midfielder

Team information
- Current team: Perugia (assistant)

Senior career*
Years	Team	Apps	(Gls)
1977–1980	Modena	56	(15)
1980–1983	Milan	61	(5)
1983–1985	Modena	55	(2)
1985–1986	Perugia	34	(0)
1986–1990	Pisa	117	(11)
1990–1993	Parma	82	(3)

Managerial career
- 1994–1996: Collecchio
- 1997–1998: Giulianova
- 1998–2000: Messina
- 2000–2001: Brescello
- 2001–2002: Crotone
- 2002–2003: Spezia
- 2004–2005: Grosseto
- 2005–2006: Salernitana
- 2006–2007: Foggia
- 2007–2008: Arezzo
- 2008–2009: Venezia
- 2009–2010: Pisa
- 2012–2013: Viareggio
- 2013–2014: Grosseto
- 2014: Paganese
- 2016: Como
- * Club domestic league appearances and goals

Stefano Cuoghi (born 8 August 1959 in Modena) is an Italian association football coach and former professional player who played as a midfielder. He made 137 appearances in Serie A.

He is currently working with Perugia as Silvio Baldini's assistant, being appointed on that role on 20 September 2022.

== Honours ==
Parma

- Coppa Italia winner: 1991–92
- UEFA Cup Winners' Cup winner: 1992–93
