= Tarcisio Catanese =

Italian footballer and manager

Personal information
- Date of birth: 6 September 1967
- Place of birth: Palermo, Italy
- Date of death: 2 March 2017 (aged 49)
- Height: 1.78 m (5 ft 10 in)
- Position: Midfielder

Youth career
- Napoli

Senior career*
Years	Team	Apps	(Gls)
1985–1986	Napoli	0	(0)
1986–1989	Reggina	65	(5)
1989–1992	Parma	74	(4)
1992	Bologna	7	(0)
1992–1993	Cosenza	28	(1)
1993–1994	Reggiana	0	(0)
1994	Ravenna	14	(2)
1994–1995	Ancona	26	(3)
1995–1997	Parma	5	(0)
1997	Como	12	(2)
1997–1998	Cremonese	26	(3)
1998–2000	Montevarchi	52	(2)
2000–2002	Brescello	54	(6)
2002–2003	Reggiana	10	(0)
2004	Chiusi	?	(?)
2004–2005	Monticelli	?	(?)

Managerial career
- 2004: Chiusi (player/coach)
- 2004–2005: Monticelli (player/coach)
- 2006–2008: Trapani
- * Club domestic league appearances and goals

Tarcisio Catanese (6 September 1967 – 2 March 2017) was an Italian professional football midfielder who was later involved in the sport as a manager.

He played in Serie A for many years and amassed 79 appearances in two spells at Parma F.C., where he later became a youth coach. He then worked as head coach of Trapani in the Serie D league, and as a scout in his native Sicily for Juventus.

In July 2011 he was hired by U.S. Città di Palermo as head of the Allievi Nazionali under-17 team. He was replaced by Rosario Compagno, his predecessor at the same role, later in July 2012.
