= Ivo Pulga =

Italian footballer, coach, and scout

Personal information
- Date of birth: 20 June 1964 (age 62)
- Place of birth: Modena, Italy
- Position: Central midfielder

Team information
- Current team: Brescia (scout)

Senior career*
Years	Team	Apps	(Gls)
1980–1984	Carpi	87	(11)
1982–1983	Bologna	0	(0)
1984–1985	Modena	34	(2)
1985–1991	Cagliari	174	(6)
1991–1993	Parma	27	(0)
1993–1994	Vicenza	21	(0)
1994–1999	Carpi	115	(3)
Total		458	(22)

Managerial career
- 2012–2013: Cagliari
- 2014: Cagliari
- 2018: Brescia
- 2018–: Brescia (scout)
- * Club domestic league appearances and goals

Ivo Pulga (born 20 June 1964) is an Italian association football coach and former player, who played as a midfielder. He currently works as a scout with Brescia in the Serie B.

== Career ==
=== Playing career ===
A physical centre midfielder, Pulga started his career at Serie D amateurs Carpi; after a rather unsuccessful loan at Bologna (no first team appearances), he moved back into professionalism in 1984 by joining Serie C1 club Modena. In 1985, he joined Cagliari, then in Serie C1 as well; from 1989 to 1991 he was one of the protagonists, as team captain and established fan favourite player, of the club's two consecutive promotions to Serie A under the tenure of Claudio Ranieri.

He then joined high-flyers Parma in 1991, winning a Coppa Italia and a UEFA Cup Winners Cup while at the club but playing far less than before. Pulga left Parma in 1993 to sign for Serie B club Vicenza, and then returned to Carpi one year later, ending his playing career after five more seasons there.

=== Coaching career ===
After retirement, Pulga became a youth coach at Modena (first at Allievi Nazionali, then at Primavera). He then served as Agatino Cuttone's assistant during some part of the 2011–12 Serie B campaign.

An UEFA Pro licensed coach, Pulga was named to replace Massimo Ficcadenti as new coach of Serie A club Cagliari, alongside newly appointed assistant Diego López, on 2 October 2012 in a somewhat surprise move due to his lack of managerial experience. He swapped roles with López in July 2013, after the latter was allowed to serve as head coach after being admitted at the yearly UEFA Pro License course. He was relieved from his assistant coach duties on 18 February 2014 by club chairman Massimo Cellino, who however changed his mind on 6 April 2014 by dismissing Diego López instead and re-hiring Pulga, this time as head coach.

He returned into management on 29 April 2018, as the new head coach of Brescia in the Serie B league, a team that was acquired by Cellino (his former president at Cagliari) just a few months earlier. On 6 June 2018, he was replaced as head coach by David Suazo.

== Managerial statistics ==
As of 19 May 2014.

Team	Nat	From	To	Record							
Team	Nat	From	To	G	W	D	L	GF	GA	GD	Win %
Cagliari	(Italy)	2 October 2012	31 May 2013	34	13	9	12	44	47	−3	38.24
Cagliari	(Italy)	7 April 2014	20 June 2014	6	2	1	3	3	10	−7	33.33
Total				40	15	10	15	47	57	−10	37.50
