= Marco Osio =

Italian footballer and manager

Personal information
- Full name: Marco Osio
- Date of birth: 13 January 1966 (age 60)
- Place of birth: Ancona, Italy
- Height: 1.80 m (5 ft 11 in)
- Position: Midfielder

Youth career
- Torino

Senior career*
Years	Team	Apps	(Gls)
1983–1986	Torino	6	(0)
1986–1987	Empoli	17	(2)
1987–1993	Parma	185	(29)
1993–1995	Torino	27	(1)
1995–1996	Palmeiras	20	(1)
1996–1997	Saronno	21	(2)
1997–1998	Pistoiese	17	(1)
1998–2000	Faenza	29	(8)
2000–2001	Alzano Virescit	14	(1)

Managerial career
- 2001–2002: Brescello (assistant coach)
- 2002–2003: Brescello
- 2003–2005: Valle d'Aosta
- 2006: Pergolese
- 2006–2007: Crociati Parma
- 2007: Nuorese
- 2011: Fortis Juventus
- 2011–2012: Ancona 1905
- 2013: Bellaria Igea Marina
- 2013–: Rimini
- * Club domestic league appearances and goals

Marco Osio (born 13 January 1966 in Ancona) is an Italian former football midfielder, and former manager of Ancona 1905.

== Career ==
=== As player ===
Osio started his playing career in the Torino youth system. In 1986, he moved at Empoli, and Parma in 1987. In his stay at Parma, he became one of the fan favourites, earning the nickname "Il Sindaco" (The Mayor) by the local supporters, and he was a key player for the team that climbed the Italian football divisions, up from Serie C1 to the top division, Serie A. During his time with the club, he enjoyed both domestic and European success, winning the Coppa Italia, and the European Cup Winners' Cup, also participating in the UEFA Cup. In 1993, after six seasons with Parma and a failed bid by Sampdoria, he returned to Torino for two seasons before an unexpected move to Brazilian club Palmeiras for the 1995-1996 season, which makes him one of the very few Italian footballers to have ever played in the South-American country; he won the Paulista Championship with the club in 1996, despite having played only a handful of minutes for the club. After a few experiences at the Serie C level, he retired in 2001.

=== As coach ===
In 2001 Osio became assistant manager of Serie C2 club Brescello. He was successively promoted to the head coaching position in 2002.

From December 2003 to February 2005 he served as head coach of Serie D side Valle d'Aosta and in the latter matchdays of the 2005–2006 season he coached Pergolese, another Serie D team. In 2006–07, Osio served as head coach of Crociati Parma (also known as Crociati Noceto), with whom he won Eccellenza and ensured promotion to the 2007–08 Serie D. In July 2007, he was chosen by Serie C2 club Nuorese for their head coaching position. He was however sacked on 17 September due to poor results in the beginning of Nuorese's 2007–08 Serie C2 campaign (one point in three matches).

On 12 January 2011 he became the new coach of Fortis Juventus in Serie D in place of the sacked Roberto Galbiati.

On 29 November 2011 he becomes the new coach of Ancona 1905 in Serie D, in place of the sacked Massimiliano Favo, until 3 February 2012 when he rescinds the contract by mutual agreement with the company.

== Honours ==
Parma

- Coppa Italia: 1991–92
- European Cup Winners' Cup: 1992–93

Palmeiras

- Paulista Championship: 1996
