= Lorenzo Minotti =

Italian footballer

Personal information
- Date of birth: 8 February 1967 (age 59)
- Place of birth: Cesena, Italy
- Height: 1.85 m (6 ft 1 in)
- Position: Defender

Senior career*
Years	Team	Apps	(Gls)
1985–1987	Cesena	14	(0)
1987–1996	Parma	280	(29)
1996–1997	Cagliari	18	(2)
1997–2000	Torino	7	(0)
2000–2001	Treviso	28	(3)
Total		318	(34)

International career
1994–1995	Italy	8	(0)
Medal record
Representing Italy
FIFA World Cup
Runner-up	1994
- * Club domestic league appearances and goals

Lorenzo Minotti (Italian pronunciation: [loˈrɛntso miˈnɔtti]; born 8 February 1967) is an Italian former professional footballer who played as a defender. Throughout his club career, he played for Italian sides Cesena, Parma, Cagliari, Torino, and Treviso; he is mostly remembered for his successful stint with Parma, where he won several domestic and international titles as the club's captain. At international level, he represented Italy on eight occasions between 1994 and 1995, and was a non-playing member of the team that reached the 1994 FIFA World Cup Final.

== Personal life ==
Born in Cesena, Emilia-Romagna, in 1967, Minotti later grew up in San Giorgio, where he began to play football as a youth in the town's polisportiva, also competing in judo and athletics. He later joined the Cesena Youth squad at the age of 8, later making his professional debut with the senior side. Minotti and his wife Debora have two children: Alex, who plays football for the Bologna youth side, and Andrea.

== Club career ==
Minotti started his professional career his in 1985 with his hometown club Cesena in Serie B, at the age of 18, and he subsequently played in Serie A with Parma (1987–1996) for most of his career, followed by spells with Cagliari (1996–97), Torino (1997–2000), and Treviso (2000–2001). In total, he played 201 matches and scored 19 goals in Serie A, and during his successful time with Parma under manager Nevio Scala, he won two Coppa Italia titles, one UEFA Cup, an UEFA Super Cup, and one UEFA Cup Winners' Cup in 1993, also receiving Runners-up medals in the 1995 Supercoppa Italiana, and the 1996–97 Serie A. The victorious 1993 European Cup Winners' Cup Final game over Royal Antwerp F.C. was played at the Wembley Stadium, and Minotti opened the scoring with a notable volley as the Italians went on to win 3–1. Minotti is regarded as one of the best players in Parma's history, and he served as the club's captain for many years.

== International career ==
Minotti won 8 caps for the Italy national football team between 1994 and 1995. He received his first international call-up for Italy's match against Switzerland on 14 October 1992, although he only made his first appearance for Italy on 16 February 1994, in a 1–0 home defeat to France. He was also chosen by manager Arrigo Sacchi for Italy's roster at the 1994 FIFA World Cup, without playing any games in the final tournament, as Italy reached the 1994 FIFA World Cup final, losing out to Brazil on penalties following a 0–0 draw. His final international appearance was on 21 June 1995, in a 2–0 defeat to Germany in Zurich, in a friendly tournament organised for the centenary of the Swiss Football Association.

== Style of play ==
A quick and technically gifted left-footed defender, Minotti played both as a centre-back and occasionally as a full-back. His main role was that of a sweeper, and modelled his game after that of Gaetano Scirea, by starting plays from the back. In his youth, he played as an attacking midfielder. Minotti was part of Parma's starting line-up in the 90s, served as the club's captain, and was called up for the Italy national side. He contributed to his team's offensive play with several goals throughout his career, despite being a defender. He also scored from volleys and curling free-kicks. In addition to his playing ability, he was known for being a tough yet fair defender on the pitch, and was only sent off once in his career. He was considered to be one of the best Italian defenders of his generation, and one of Parma's greatest players ever, and formed one of the strongest defensive partnerships in Serie A of the 1990s, along with Parma teammate Luigi Apolloni. He also stood out for his leadership qualities, serving as Parma's captain for several years.

== Post-playing career ==
After retiring from football, he became team manager of his former club Parma from 2002 to 2004. He then became director of football of Cesena from 2007 to 2009, and again from June 2010 to May 2012. In 2015, he worked as a football commentator for Sky Italia. Later that year, he was named the head of the technical sector of Parma, following the club's relegation to Serie D due to bankruptcy.

== Honours ==
=== Club ===
Parma

- Coppa Italia: 1991–92
- UEFA Cup Winners' Cup: 1992–93
- UEFA Super Cup: 1993
- UEFA Cup: 1994–95

=== International ===
Italy

- FIFA World Cup: Runner-up 1994
