= 1993–94 Serie A =

92nd season of top-tier Italian football

Serie A
- Season: 1993–94
- Dates: 29 August 1993 – 1 May 1994
- Champions: Milan; 14th title
- Relegated: Piacenza; Udinese; Atalanta; Lecce
- Champions League: Milan
- Cup Winners' Cup: Sampdoria
- UEFA Cup: Juventus; Lazio; Parma; Napoli; Internazionale
- Matches: 306
- Goals: 741 (2.42 per match)
- Top goalscorer: Giuseppe Signori (23 goals)

Serie A 1993-94 team distribution

The 1993–94 Serie A was won by Milan, being the 14th title for the rossoneri and their third in succession, complemented by glory in the UEFA Champions League. It was a disappointing season in the league for Internazionale, whose 13th-place finish saw them avoid relegation by a single point, but they compensated for this by winning the UEFA Cup. Piacenza, Udinese, Atalanta and Lecce were all relegated. Milan won the Scudetto during the penultimate match against Udinese. AC Milan also set an unprecedented record for securing the title by scoring just 36 goals, the lowest in Serie A history.

This was the final season in which two points were awarded for a win; going forward this changed to three points.

== Teams ==
Reggiana, Cremonese, Piacenza and Lecce had been promoted from Serie B. Milan won the title scoring just 36 goals from 34 games all season; they didn't score more than 2 goals in any single game throughout the season.

== Personnel and Sponsoring ==
Team	Head Coach	Kit manufacturer	Shirt sponsor
Atalanta	(Italy) Cesare Prandelli & (Italy) Andrea Valdinoci	Lotto	Tamoil
Cagliari	(Italy) Bruno Giorgi	Erreà	Pecorino Sardo
Cremonese	(Italy) Luigi Simoni	Uhlsport	Moncart
Foggia	(Czech Republic) Zdeněk Zeman	Adidas	None
Genoa	(Italy) Franco Scoglio	Erreà	Saiwa
Internazionale	(Italy) Giampiero Marini	Umbro	Fiorucci
Juventus	(Italy) Giovanni Trapattoni	Kappa	Danone
Lazio	(Italy) Dino Zoff	Umbro	Banca di Roma
Lecce	(Italy) Rino Marchesi	Asics	None
Milan	(Italy) Fabio Capello	Lotto	Motta
Napoli	(Italy) Marcello Lippi	Umbro	Voiello
Parma	(Italy) Nevio Scala	Umbro	Parmalat
Piacenza	(Italy) Luigi Cagni	ABM	Cassa di Risparmio di Parma e Piacenza
Reggiana	(Italy) Giuseppe Marchioro	Asics	Burro Giglio
Roma	(Italy) Carlo Mazzone	Adidas	Barilla
Sampdoria	(Sweden) Sven-Göran Eriksson	Asics	Erg
Torino	(Italy) Emiliano Mondonico	Lotto	Fratelli Beretta
Udinese	(Italy) Adriano Fedele	Lotto	Victors Caramelle Balsamiche

== League table ==
Pos	Team	Pld	W	D	L	GF	GA	GD	Pts	Qualification or relegation
1	Milan (C)	34	19	12	3	36	15	+21	50	Qualified to Champions League
2	Juventus	34	17	13	4	58	25	+33	47	Qualification to UEFA Cup
3	Lazio	34	17	10	7	55	40	+15	44	Qualification to UEFA Cup
4	Sampdoria	34	18	8	8	64	39	+25	44	Qualification to Cup Winners' Cup
5	Parma	34	17	7	10	50	35	+15	41	Qualification to UEFA Cup
6	Napoli	34	12	12	10	41	35	+6	36	Qualification to UEFA Cup
7	Roma	34	10	15	9	35	30	+5	35	
8	Torino	34	11	12	11	39	37	+2	34	
9	Foggia	34	10	13	11	46	46	0	33	
10	Cremonese	34	8	16	10	41	41	0	32	
11	Genoa	34	8	16	10	32	40	−8	32	
12	Cagliari	34	10	12	12	39	48	−9	32	
13	Internazionale (Note: Internazionale qualified to 1994–95 UEFA Cup as defending champions.)	34	11	9	14	46	45	+1	31	Qualification to UEFA Cup
14	Reggiana	34	10	11	13	29	37	−8	31	
15	Piacenza (R)	34	8	14	12	32	43	−11	30	Relegation to Serie B
16	Udinese (R)	34	7	14	13	35	48	−13	28	Relegation to Serie B
17	Atalanta (R)	34	5	11	18	35	65	−30	21	Relegation to Serie B
18	Lecce (R)	34	3	5	26	28	72	−44	11	Relegation to Serie B

Source: 1993–94 Serie A, RSSSF.com, Soccerway
Rules for classification: 1) Points; 2) Head-to-head points; 3) Head-to-head goal difference; 4) Goal difference; 5) Goals scored; 6) Draw. (Note: Head-to-head record is used only after all the matches between the teams in question have been played).
(C) Champions; (R) Relegated

== Results ==
Home \ Away	ATA	CAG	CRE	FOG	GEN	INT	JUV	LAZ	LEC	MIL	NAP	PAR	PIA	REG	ROM	SAM	TOR	UDI
Atalanta	—	5–2 (Note: The match was played at Stadio Renato Dall'Ara.)	0–0	1–1	2–1	2–1	1–3	1–1	3–4	0–1	1–1	0–2	0–0	2–1	1–1	1–4	2–2	1–1
Cagliari	1–1	—	0–0	1–1	0–0	1–0	0–1	4–1	2–1	0–0	1–2	0–4	2–0	3–0	1–1	0–0	2–1	1–2
Cremonese	2–0	3–1	—	2–0	1–1	1–4	1–1	1–0	2–1	0–2	2–0	0–0	4–0	1–1	1–1	0–0	1–1	1–1
Foggia	1–1	0–1	1–1	—	3–0	1–1	1–1	4–1	5–0	1–1	0–1	3–2	1–0	1–0	1–1	1–2	1–0	2–2
Genoa	2–1	1–1	1–0	1–4	—	1–0	1–1	1–1	2–0	0–0	0–0	0–4	0–1	0–0	2–0	1–1	1–1	3–0
Internazionale	1–2	3–3	2–1	3–1	1–3	—	2–2	1–2	4–1	1–2	0–0	3–2	2–0	2–1	2–2	3–0	0–0	1–0
Juventus	2–1	1–1	1–0	2–0	4–0	1–0	—	6–1	5–1	0–1	1–0	4–0	2–0	4–0	0–0	3–1	3–2	1–0
Lazio	3–1	4–0	4–2	0–0	4–0	0–0	3–1	—	3–0	0–1	3–0	2–1	1–0	2–0	1–0	1–1	1–2	2–1
Lecce	5–1	0–1	2–4	0–2	0–0	1–3	1–1	1–2	—	0–1	0–1	1–1	1–1	2–4	0–2	0–3 (Note: The match was played at Stadio San Nicola.)	1–2	1–0
Milan	2–0	2–1	1–0	2–1	1–0 (Note: The match was played at Stadio San Paolo.)	2–1	1–1	0–0	0–0	—	2–1	1–1	2–0	0–1	2–0	1–0	1–0	2–2
Napoli	4–0	1–2	2–1	1–1	1–1	0–0	0–0	1–2	3–1	1–0	—	2–0	0–0	5–0	1–1	1–2	0–0	2–1
Parma	2–1	3–1	2–1	3–0	2–1	4–1	2–0	2–0	1–0	0–0	1–3	—	0–0	1–0	0–2	2–1	3–0	0–1
Piacenza	4–0	1–1	1–1	5–4	1–1	2–1	0–0	1–2	2–1	0–0	1–1	1–1	—	3–2	1–0	2–1	0–3	0–0
Reggiana	3–0	3–1	2–0	0–0	1–1	1–0	0–0	0–0	1–0	0–1	1–0	2–0	1–1	—	0–0	1–1	1–0	1–1
Roma	2–1	2–0	1–2	0–0	1–1	1–1	2–1	1–1	3–0	0–2	2–3	2–0	3–1	0–0	—	0–1	2–0	0–2
Sampdoria	3–1	1–2	3–1	6–0	1–1	3–1	1–1	3–4	2–1	3–2	4–1	1–1	2–1	1–0	0–1	—	1–0	6–2
Torino	2–1	2–1	1–1	1–4	2–0	2–0	1–1	1–1	3–0	0–0	1–1	1–2	1–0	2–0	1–1	2–3	—	1–0
Udinese	0–0	1–1	3–3	3–0	0–4	0–1	0–3	2–2	2–1	0–0	3–1	0–1	2–2	2–1	0–0	0–2	1–1	—

Legend: Blue = home team win; Yellow = draw; Red = away team win.

== Top goalscorers ==
Rank	Player	Club	Goals
1	(Italy) Giuseppe Signori	Lazio	23
2	(Italy) Gianfranco Zola	Parma	18
3	(Italy) Roberto Baggio	Juventus	17
3	(Italy) Andrea Silenzi	Torino	17
5	(Uruguay) Rubén Sosa	Internazionale	16
6	(Uruguay) Daniel Fonseca	Napoli	15
6	(Netherlands) Ruud Gullit	Sampdoria	15
8	(Italy) Marco Branca	Udinese	14
9	(Panama) Julio Dely Valdés	Cagliari	13
10	(Argentina) Abel Balbo	Roma	12
10	(Italy) Roberto Mancini	Sampdoria	12
10	(Belgium) Luís Oliveira	Cagliari	12
10	(Netherlands) Bryan Roy	Foggia	12

== Season tickets ==
The season ticket sales as they were before the beginning of the season:

Source: Statistiche Spettatori Serie A 1993-1994

Rank	Club	Tickets
1	Milan	58,532
2	Lazio	36,005
3	Inter	34,403
4	Juventus	34,382
5	Roma	34,333
6	Sampdoria	23,144
7	Parma	20,826
8	Torino	17,115
9	Atalanta	14,401
10	Foggia	13,801
11	Napoli	13,372
12	Genoa	13,686
13	Cagliari	11,684
14	Udinese	11,101
15	Reggiana	10,252
16	Piacenza	8,215
17	Lecce	5,750
18	Cremonese	3,109

== Attendances ==
No.	Club	Average
1	Milan	65,708
2	Roma	52,615
3	Lazio	50,149
4	Internazionale	49,469
5	Juventus	44,520
6	Napoli	39,594
7	Sampdoria	30,616
8	Genoa	26,391
9	Torino	26,130
10	Parma	25,364
11	Atalanta	20,335
12	Foggia	19,468
13	Cagliari	18,343
14	Udinese	18,163
15	Piacenza	14,658
16	Reggiana	13,377
17	Lecce	12,394
18	Cremonese	10,611

== References and sources ==
- Almanacco Illustrato del Calcio - La Storia 1898-2004, Panini Edizioni, Modena, September 2005
