= 1991–92 Coppa Italia =

Tournament details
- Country: Italy
- Dates: 21 Aug 1991 – 14 May 1992
- Teams: 48

Final positions
- Champions: Parma (1st title)
- Runners-up: Juventus

Tournament statistics
- Matches played: 94
- Goals scored: 194 (2.06 per match)
- Top goal scorer: Alessandro Melli (5 goals)

The 1991–92 Coppa Italia, the 45th Coppa Italia was an Italian Football Federation domestic cup competition won by Parma.

== First round ==
Team 1	Agg.	Team 2	1st leg	2nd leg
Modena (B)	2–1	Piacenza (B)	1–0	1–1
Bari (A)	(a) 1–1	Empoli (C1A)	0–0	1–1
Reggiana (B)	3–2	Cosenza (B)	1–0	2–2
Lucchese (B)	3–1	Venezia (B)	3–1	0–0
Cesena (B)	3–0	Perugia (C1B)	2–0	1–0
Messina (B)	1–3	Palermo (B)	1–0	0–3
Pisa (B)	3–0	Monza (C1A)	2–0	1–0
Taranto (B)	3–1	Reggina (C1B)	3–1	0–0
Brescia (B)	2–1	Pescara (B)	2–0	0–1
Casarano (C1B)	0–2	Lecce (B)	0–0	0–2
Ancona (B)	2–0	Barletta (C1B)	1–0	1–0
Bologna (B)	2–5	Fidelis Andria (C1B)	2–3	0–2
Padova (B)	1–0	Salernitana (C1B)	1–0	0–0
Udinese (B)	4–2	Triestina (C1A)	3–1	1–1
Cagliari (A)	0–1	Como (C1A)	0–1	0–0
Avellino (B)	0–1	Casertana (B)	0–0	0–1

== Second round ==
Team 1	Agg.	Team 2	1st leg	2nd leg
Sampdoria (A)	6–1	Modena (B)	3–1	3–0
Bari (A)	5–2	Ascoli (A)	2–1	3–1
Napoli (A)	1–0	Reggiana (B)	1–0	0–0
Roma (A)	3–1	Lucchese (B)	1–0	2–1
Fiorentina (A)	5–2	Cesena (B)	2–1	3–1
Parma (A)	2–1	Palermo (B)	0–0	2–1
Pisa (B)	3–2	Foggia (A)	2–1	1–1
Taranto (B)	1–3	Genoa (A)	0–1	1–2 (aet)
Milan (A)	4–1	Brescia (B)	2–0	2–1
Lecce (B)	1–5	Hellas Verona (A)	1–0	0–5
Torino (A)	5–2	Ancona (B)	4–1	1–1
Fidelis Andria (C1B)	2–5	Lazio (A)	0–2	2–3
Atalanta (A)	4–3	Padova (B)	3–1	1–2
Udinese (B)	0–3	Juventus (A)	0–0	0–3
Cremonese (B)	0–1	Como (C1A)	0–0	0–1
Internazionale (A)	3–2	Casertana (B)	1–0	2–2

== Round of 16 ==
Team 1	Agg.	Team 2	1st leg	2nd leg
Sampdoria (A)	(a) 3–3	Bari (A)	1–1	2–2 (aet)
Roma (A)	(a) 3–3	Napoli (A)	1–0	2–3
Parma (A)	(a) 1–1	Fiorentina (A)	0–0	1–1
Pisa (B)	2–4	Genoa (A)	2–0	0–4
Hellas Verona (A)	3–3 (a)	Milan (A)	2–2	1–1
Torino (A)	2–0	Lazio (A)	2–0	0–0
Atalanta (A)	1–3	Juventus (A)	0–0	1–3
Internazionale (A)	4–3	Como (C1A)	2–2	2–1

== Quarter-finals ==
Team 1	Agg.	Team 2	1st leg	2nd leg
Sampdoria (A)	2–1	Roma (A)	1–0	1–1
Parma (A)	4–1	Genoa (A)	2–0	2–1
Milan (A)	3–1	Torino (A)	2–0	1–1
Juventus (A)	3–1	Internazionale (A)	1–0	2–1 (aet)

== Semi-finals ==
Team 1	Agg.	Team 2	1st leg	2nd leg
Parma (A)	3–2	Sampdoria (A)	1–0	2–2 (aet)
Milan (A)	0–1	Juventus (A)	0–0	0–1

== Final ==
=== First leg ===
7 May 1992
20:30

Juventus	1–0	Parma
Baggio 23' (pen.)

Stadio delle Alpi, Turin
Attendance: 47,872
Referee: Concetto Lo Bello

=== Second leg ===
14 May 1992
20:30

Parma	2–0	Juventus
Melli 45'; Osio 61'

Stadio Ennio Tardini, Parma
Attendance: 24,471
Referee: Fabio Baldas

Parma won 2–1 on aggregate.

== Top goalscorers ==
Rank	Player	Club	Goals
1	(Italy) Alessandro Melli	Parma	5
2	(Netherlands) Marco van Basten	Milan	4
2	(Italy) Marco Ferrante	Pisa	4
2	(Italy) Roberto Baggio	Juventus	4
2	(Italy) Ruggiero Rizzitelli	Roma	4
2	(Uruguay) Carlos Aguilera	Genoa	4
2	(Brazil) Amarildo Souza do Amaral	Cesena	4
2	(England) David Platt	Bari	4
9	(Italy) Fausto Pari	Sampdoria	3
9	(Italy) Gianluca Vialli	Sampdoria	3
9	(Italy) Fabrizio Mastini	Fidelis Andria	3
9	(Italy) Gianluigi Lentini	Torino	3
9	(Italy) Fabrizio Ravanelli	Reggiana	3
