= List of Parma Calcio 1913 players =

Parma Calcio 1913 S.r.l. is an Italian professional football club based in Parma, Emilia-Romagna, which currently plays in the Serie A. It was founded in 1913 as Parma Foot Ball Club, began playing league football in 1919 and moved into current home the Stadio Ennio Tardini in 1923. Since those early days the club's first team has competed in numerous nationally and internationally organised competitions. All players who have played in 100 or more such matches are listed below. Appearances and goals are for league matches only; substitute appearances are included.

Alessandro Lucarelli is the player who has made most appearances for the club in league competition (333), while Luigi Apolloni has made more appearances than any other in all competitions (384). William Bronzoni is the club's record league goalscorer, having scored 78 league goals during his Parma career; those goals coming in 201 matches in an eight-year period following the Second World War ending in 1953. Hernán Crespo came close to beating that record, but just fell short when he left the club in early 2012, scoring 72 times in the league. He does, however, hold the scoring record for all competitions, having netted 94 times.

== List of players ==
- Appearances and goals are for league matches only.
- Players are listed according to the date of their first team debut for the club.
Players who represented their country while at the club.

Statistics correct as of 10 November 2026

Table headers

- **Nationality** – If a player played international football, the country/countries he played for are shown. Otherwise, the player's nationality is given as their country of birth.
- **Parma career** – The year of the player's first appearance for Parma to the year of his last appearance.
- **Appearances** – The number of games appeared in, including those played as a substitute.

Positions key
**GK**	Goalkeeper
**DF**	Defender
**MF**	Midfielder
**FW**	Striker

Players whose name is in bold currently play for the club.

List of S.S.D. Parma Calcio 1913 players with at least 100 league appearances
Name	Nationality	Position	Parma career	Appearances	Goals	Ref
Tito Mistrali	Italy	FW	1921–1927; 1929–1931	109	40	
Alfredo Mattioli	Italy	FW	1921–1931; 1933–1935	206	33	
Bruno Cresci	Italy	MF	1927–1938	183	5	
Saulle Franzini	Italy	MF	1921–1927; 1929–1932	117	11	
Bruno Alfier	Italy	GK	1951–1958	109	4	
Giovanni Mazzoni	Italy	MF	1922–1934	242	9	
Antonio Quaglietti	Italy	MF	1925–1932	121	21	
Walter Negroni	Italy	DF	1928–1938	175	2	
Gino Giuberti	Italy	MF	1929–1935; 1941–1946	113	2	
Giuseppe Stocchi	Italy		1929–1936	128	52	
Dino Paini	Italy	MF	1929–1937	119	30	
Riccardo Poli	Italy		1929–1935	122	32	
Augusto Ponticelli	Italy		1930–1941	236	12	
Marino Cavazzuti	Italy	MF	1932–1940	123	4	
Luigi Del Grosso	Italy	FW	1933–1936; 1940–1941; 1946–1947	115	42	
Venuto Lombatti	Italy	MF	1939–1946	123	27	
William Bronzoni	Italy	FW	1945–1953	206	79	
Elios Bonzagni	Italy	FW	1946–1953	115	4	
Ivo Cocconi	Italy	DF	1948–1962	308	4	
Renzo Sassi	Italy	MF	1948–1952; 1962–1965	122	2	
Raimondo Taucar	Italy	DF	1949–1955	182	1	
Július Korostelev	Czechoslovakia	MF	1951–1956	113	49	
Gino Menozzi	Italy	GK	1951–1956	120	0	
Cestmír Vycpálek	Czechoslovakia	MF	1952–1958	151	29	
Claudio Darni	Italy	DF	1953–1959	131	1	
Pietro Miniussi	Italy	MF	1954–1958	106	3	
Carlo Azzali	Italy	MF	1956–1960	118	8	
Giuseppe Calzolari	Italy	MF	1958–1961; 1964–1965	113	29	
Ermes Polli	Italy	DF	1958–1969	310	2	
Primo Sentimenti	Italy	DF	1959–1964	113	0	
Aldo Silvagna	Italy	DF	1959–1967	213	6	
Olmes Neri	Italy	MF	1960–1964	114	4	
Alberto Recchia	Italy	GK	1960–1963	108	0	
Gian Paolo Fontana	Italy	DF	1961–1969	193	6	
Giovanni Meregalli	Italy	FW	1961–1963; 1964–1965	104	15	
Gianni Uccelli	Italy	GK	1961–1969	122	0	
Giuseppe Grulla	Italy	DF	1964–1971	133	1	
Giuseppe Regali	Italy	MF	1969–1974	157	12	
Bruno Piaser	Italy	DF	1969–1973	116	2	
Fabio Bonci	Italy	FW	1971–1972; 1974–1975; 1978–1980	121	44	
Giovanni Colonnelli	Italy	MF	1971–1979	242	18	
Italo Toscani	Italy	FW	1973–1974; 1978–1982	103	4	
Fausto Daolio	Italy	MF	1972–1976	159	9	
Michele Benedetto	Italy	DF	1972–1977	174	1	
Alberto Rizzati	Italy	FW	1972–1974; 1975–1977	130	49	
Marco Torresani	Italy	FW	1975–1980	172	8	
Fabio Aselli	Italy	MF	1980–1985	139	6	
Gabriele Pin	Italy	MF	1983–1985; 1992–1996	165	9	
Roberto Mussi	Italy	DF	1984–1987; 1994–1999	213	2	
Valeriano Fiorin	Italy	MF	1985–1989	126	3	
Alessandro Melli	Italy	FW	1985–1994; 1995–1997	241	56	
Luca Bucci	Italy	GK	1986–1987; 1988–1990; 1993–1997; 2005–2008	181	0	
Luigi Apolloni	Italy	DF	1987–2000	304	8	
Enzo Gambaro	Italy	DF	1987–1991	132	4	
Lorenzo Minotti	Italy	DF	1987–1996	280	29	
Marco Osio	Italy	MF	1987–1993	175	29	
Daniele Zoratto	Italy	MF	1989–1994	144	0	
Tomas Brolin	Sweden	FW	1990–1995; 1997	144	20	
Georges Grün	Belgium	DF	1990–1994	109	9	
Antonio Benarrivo	Italy	DF	1991–2004	258	5	
Alberto Di Chiara	Italy	DF	1991–1996	142	5	
Faustino Asprilla	Colombia	FW	1992–1996; 1998–1999	106	26	
Massimo Crippa	Italy	MF	1993–1998	147	9	
Gianfranco Zola	Italy	FW	1993–1996	102	49	
Dino Baggio	Italy	MF	1994–2000	173	19	
Fernando Couto	Portugal	DF	1994–1996; 2005–2008	102	5	
Roberto Néstor Sensini	Argentina	DF	1994–1999; 2001–2002	191	11	
Fabio Cannavaro	Italy	DF	1995–2002	212	5	
Gianluigi Buffon	Italy	GK	1995–2001; 2021–2023	211	0	
Hernán Crespo	Argentina	FW	1996–2000; 2010–2012	163	72	
Lilian Thuram	France	DF	1996–2001	163	1	
Sébastien Frey	France	GK	2001–2005	132	0	
Daniele Bonera	Italy	DF	2002–2006	114	1	
Mark Bresciano	Australia	MF	2002–2006	123	19	
Domenico Morfeo	Italy	MF	2003–2008	112	16	
Massimo Paci	Italy	DF	2006–2011	124	5	
Paolo Castellini	Italy	DF	2006–2010	136	1	
Stefano Morrone	Italy	MF	2007–2013	169	9	
Alessandro Lucarelli	Italy	DF	2008–2018	333	20	
Antonio Mirante	Italy	GK	2009–2015	204	0	
Cristian Zaccardo	Italy	DF	2009–2013	118	10	
Jonathan Biabiany	France	FW	2009–2010; 2011–2015; 2018–2019	155	20	
Daniele Galloppa	Italy	MF	2009–2015	105	4	
Massimo Gobbi	Italy	MF	2010–2015; 2018–2019	171	4	
Gabriel Paletta	Italy	DF	2010–2015	122	5	
Riccardo Gagliolo	Sweden	DF	2017–2018; 2018-2021	132	11	
Simone Iacoponi	Italy	DF	2017–2022	146	4	
Roberto Inglese	Italy	FW	2018–2024	104	20	
Luigi Sepe	Italy	GK	2019–2021	107	0	
Simon Sohm	Switzerland	MF	2020-2025	142	5	
**Enrico Del Prato**	Italy	DF	2021-	183	12	
Hernani	Brazil	MF	2019-2021; 2023-2025	130	13	
Dennis Man	Romania	FW	2020-2025	133	26	
Adrian Benedyczak	Poland	FW	2021-2026	117	25	
Ange-Yoan Bonny	France	FW	2021-2025	109	12	
**Adrián Bernabé**	Spain	MF	2021-	140	18	
Nahuel Estévez	Argentina	MF	2022-2026	114	4	

== Club captains ==
The current captain is Enrico Del Prato.

Club captains
Dates	Name	Notes
	(Italy) William Bronzoni	—
1991–1996	(Italy) Lorenzo Minotti	Captain for the 1992 Coppa Italia, 1993 European Cup Winners' Cup, 1993 European Super Cup and 1995 UEFA Cup victories
1996–1999	(Argentina) Roberto Sensini	Captain for the 1999 UEFA Cup and 1999 Coppa Italia victories
1999–2001	(France) Lilian Thuram	—
2001–2002	(Italy) Fabio Cannavaro	Club captain for the 2002 Coppa Italia victory, although Antonio Benarrivo led the team on-field
2002	(Italy) Marco Di Vaio	—
2002–2003	(France) Sabri Lamouchi	—
2003–2004	(Italy) Matteo Ferrari	—
2004–2008	(Italy) Giuseppe Cardone	—
2008	(Italy) Giulio Falcone	—
2008–2009	(Italy) Cristiano Lucarelli	—
2009–2013	(Italy) Stefano Morrone	—
2013–2018	(Italy) Alessandro Lucarelli	—
2018–2021	(Portugal) Bruno Alves	—
2021–2023	(Italy) Gianluigi Buffon	—
2023–present	(Italy) Enrico Del Prato	—
