= List of Parma Calcio 1913 records and statistics =

This list encompasses the major honours won by and records set by Parma Calcio 1913, their managers and their players, an Italian professional football club currently playing in Serie A and based in Parma, Emilia-Romagna. The player records section includes details of the club's leading goalscorers and those who have made most appearances in first-team competitions. It also records notable achievements by Parma players on the international stage, and the highest transfer fees paid and received by the club and details Parma's achievements in major competitions. Although Parma have never won a domestic league title, they have won three Italian Cups, one Supercoppa Italiana, as well as two UEFA Cups, one European Super Cup and one UEFA Cup Winners' Cup. The club won all eight of these trophies between 1992 and 2002, a period in which it is also achieved its best ever league finish as runners-up in the 1996–97 season.

Statistics accurate as of 28 May 2018

== Honours ==
Parma have won eight major titles in their history, with all eight coming in the space of ten years between 1992 and 2002. The only two major honours that Parma are yet to win are the Serie A title and the UEFA Champions League, the most prestigious domestic and continental competitions, respectively. Perhaps reflecting this, Parma are one of just five clubs worldwide who have won a major European trophy without having also won a national league title, along with Villarreal CF, West Ham United, Real Zaragoza and Atalanta BC. The club were also the only side to represent Italy in European competition for every year between 1991 and 2005

=== National ===
- Coppa Italia:
  - Winners (3): 1991–92, 1998–99, 2001–02
  - Runners-up (2): 1994–95, 2000–01
- Supercoppa Italiana:
  - Winners (1): 1999
  - Runners-up (3): 1992, 1995, 2002
- Serie A:
  - Runners-up (1): 1996–97
- Serie B:
  - Runners-up (2): 2008–09, 2017–18

=== European ===
- UEFA Cup:
  - Winners (2): 1994–95, 1998–99
- European Super Cup:
  - Winners (1): 1993
- European Cup Winners' Cup:
  - Winners (1): 1992–93
  - Runners-up (1): 1993–94

=== Minor ===
- Prima Divisione:
  - Runners-up (1): 1928–29 (Note: At the time, this was one of 3 parallel regional second tier divisions.)
- Seconda Divisione:
  - Winners (1): 1924–25 (Note: At the time, this was one of 2 parallel regional second tier divisions.)
- Promozione:
  - Runners-up (1): 1919–20 (Note: At the time, this was one of 13 parallel regional second tier divisions.)
- Serie C:
  - Winners (4): 1953–54, 1972–73, (Note: At the time, this was one of 3 parallel regional third tier divisions.) 1983–84, (Note: At the time, this was one of 2 parallel regional third tier divisions.) 1985–86
  - Runners-up (2): 1942–43, (Note: At the time, this was one of 12 parallel regional third tier divisions.) 1978–79, 2016–17
- Serie D:
  - Winners (1): 1969–70, (Note: At the time, this was one of 9 parallel regional fourth tier divisions.) 2015–16 (Note: At the time, this was one of 9 parallel regional fourth tier divisions.)
- Coppa delle Alpi:
  - Winners (1): 1960–61 (Note: Parma competed as a representative of Italy)

=== Friendly Tournaments ===
- Trofeo Ciudad de Zaragoza:
  - Winners (1): 1998
  - Runners-up (1): 2000
- Trofeo Birra Moretti:
  - Winners (1): 1999
- Orange Trophy:
  - Winners (2): 2000, 2007
- Joan Gamper Trophy:
  - Runners-up (1): 2001
- Ciutat de Barcelona Trophy:
  - Winners (1): 2003
- Trofeo Costa del Sol:
  - Runners-up (1): 2010

== Players ==
All current players are in bold.

=== Appearances ===
Antonio Benarrivo heads the all-time appearances list in Serie A and European competitions and is the only player who was at the club for all eight major trophy victories, but Alessandro Lucarelli holds the appearance record for all league competitions, playing through all four categories in the past decade.

- Youngest player: **16 years, 130 days** – Alessandro Melli v. Rimini, 20 April 1986
- Oldest player: **40 years, 300 days** – Alessandro Lucarelli v. Spezia, 18 May 2018

==== Most appearances ====
	Name	Years	Apps
1	(Italy) Luigi Apolloni	1987–2000	384
2	(Italy) Antonio Benarrivo	1991–2004	362
3	(Italy) Lorenzo Minotti	1987–1996	355
4	(Italy) Alessandro Lucarelli	2008–2018	350
5	(Italy) Ermes Polli	1958–1969	317
6	(Italy) Ivo Cocconi	1950–1962	310
7	(Italy) Alessandro Melli	1985–1994; 1995–1997	300
8	(Italy) Fabio Cannavaro	1995–2002	291
9	(Italy) Roberto Mussi	1984–1987; 1994–1999	277
10	(Italy) Giovanni Colonnelli	1971–1979	273
11	(Argentina) Roberto Sensini	1994–1999; 2001–2002	271
12	(Italy) Giovanni Mazzoni	1921–1934	246
13	(Italy) Michelangelo Benedetto		241
14	(Italy) Dino Baggio	1994–2000	240
15	(Italy) Augusto Ponticelli		236
16	(Italy) Aldo Silvagna	1959–1967	229
17	(Italy) Gabriele Pin	1983–1985; 1992–1996	228
17	(France) Lilian Thuram	1996–2001	228
19	(Italy) Luca Bucci	1986–1987; 1988–1990; 1993–1997; 2005–2008	227
20	(Italy) Gianluigi Buffon	1995–2001	225

==== Most league appearances ====
	Name	Years	Apps
1	(Italy) Alessandro Lucarelli	2008–2018	333
2	(Italy) Ermes Polli	1958–1969	310
3	(Italy) Ivo Cocconi	1950–1962	307
4	(Italy) Luigi Apolloni	1987–2000	304
5	(Italy) Lorenzo Minotti	1990–1996	280
6	(Italy) Antonio Benarrivo	1991–2004	258
7	(Italy) Giovanni Mazzoni	1921–1934	242
7	(Italy) Giovanni Colonnelli	1971–1979	242
9	(Italy) Alessandro Melli	1985–1994; 1995–1997	241
10	(Italy) Augusto Ponticelli		236

==== Most European appearances ====
	Name	Years	Apps
1	(Italy) Antonio Benarrivo	1991–2004	58
2	(Argentina) Roberto Sensini	1994–1999; 2001–2002	47
3	(Italy) Fabio Cannavaro	1995–2002	46
4	(Italy) Dino Baggio	1994–2001	43
5	(France) Lilian Thuram	1996–2001	38
6	(Italy) Luca Bucci	1986–1987; 1988–1990; 1993–1997; 2005–2008	37
7	(Italy) Gianluigi Buffon	1995–2001	36
8	(Italy) Luigi Apolloni	1987–2000	35
9	(Italy) Massimo Crippa	1993–1998	33
10	(Italy) Lorenzo Minotti	1987–1996	32

=== Goalscorers ===
- Most goals in a season in all competitions: **28** – Hernán Crespo, 1998–99
- Youngest goalscorer: **16 years and 172 days** – Alessandro Melli v Sanremese, 1 June 1986
- Most goals in a Serie A season: **23**
  - Alberto Gilardino, 2003–04
  - Alberto Gilardino, 2004–05
- Most goals in a Serie A match: **4**
  - Marco Di Vaio v Bari, 2000–01
  - Alberto Gilardino v Udinese, 2003–04
  - Alberto Gilardino v Livorno, 2004–05

==== Top scorers ====
	Name	Years	Goals (Apps)	Gl/App
1	(Argentina) Hernán Crespo	1996–2000; 2010–2012	94 (201)	0.47
2	(Italy) William Bronzoni	1945–1953	78 (201)	0.39
3	(Italy) Gianfranco Zola	1993–1996	64 (149)	0.43

==== Top league scorers ====
	Name	Years	Goals (Apps)	Gl/App
1	(Italy) William Bronzoni	1945–1953	78 (201)	0.39
2	(Argentina) Hernán Crespo	1996–2000; 2010–2012	72 (162)	0.44
3	(Italy) Luciano Degara	1941–1943	62 (53)	1.17
4	(Italy) Alessandro Melli	1985–1994; 1995–1997	56 (241)	0.23
5	(Italy) Stocchi	Pre-WWII	52	—
6	(Italy) Alberto Gilardino	2002–2005	50 (96)	0.52
7	(Czech Republic) Július Korostelev	1951–1956	49 (113)	0.43
7	(Italy) Alberto Rizzati	1972–1974; 1975–1977	49 (107)	0.46
7	(Italy) Gianfranco Zola	1993–1996	49 (102)	0.48
10	(Italy) Fabio Bonci	1971–1972; 1974–1975; 1978–1980	44 (120)	0.37

==== Top European scorers ====
	Name	Years	Goals (Apps)	Gl/App
1	(Italy) Enrico Chiesa	1996–1999	16 (18)	0.89
2	(Argentina) Hernán Crespo	1996–2000; 2010–2012	11 (21)	0.52
3	(Italy) Marco Di Vaio	1999–2002	11 (25)	0.44
4	(Colombia) Faustino Asprilla	1992–1996; 1998–1999	9 (29)	0.31
5	(Italy) Gianfranco Zola	1993–1996	8 (30)	0.27
6	(Italy) Dino Baggio	1994–2001	7 (43)	0.16
7	(Argentina) Roberto Sensini	1994–1999; 2001–2002	6 (47)	0.13
7	(Italy) Alessandro Melli	1985–1994; 1995–1997	5 (20)	0.25
9	(Italy) Emiliano Bonazzoli	2000–2003	5 (12)	0.42

==== Top cup scorers ====
	Name	Years	Goals (Apps)	Gl/App
1	(Italy) Alessandro Melli	1985–1994; 1995–1997	11	—
2	(Argentina) Hernán Crespo	1996–2000; 2010–2012	10 (16)	0.63
3	(Sweden) Tomas Brolin	1990–1995; 1997	8	—
3	(Colombia) Faustino Asprilla	1992–1996; 1998–1999	8	—

=== Goalkeepers ===
- Longest period of time without conceding in Serie A: **476 minutes**
  - Cláudio Taffarel from 9 December 1990 to 27 January 1991
  - Gianluigi Buffon in 2000–01
- Longest period of time without conceding in Serie A away from home: **319 minutes**, Antonio Mirante from 19 January to 16 March 2014

=== Award winners ===
==== Gran Galà del Calcio ====
The Gran Galà del Calcio awards are presented in multiple categories to the best performers over the course of a Serie A season. Parma players have won five of these trophies while at the club; only five clubs have won more.

- Serie A Footballer of the Year: **1**
  - Alberto Gilardino: 2005
- Serie A Italian Footballer of the Year: **1**
  - Alberto Gilardino: 2005
- Serie A Young Footballer of the Year: **1**
  - Alberto Gilardino: 2004
- Serie A Goalkeeper of the Year: **2**
  - Gianluigi Buffon: 1999, 2001

==== Serie A Awards ====
The Serie A Awards are awarded by the Lega Serie A using calculations from Opta Sports and Netco Sports to determine the best players of a particular Serie A season in different positions.

- Best Young Player: **1**
  - Dejan Kulusevski: 2019–20

=== Internationals ===
- Major senior international competition winners while at the club:
  - World Cup: **3** – Alain Boghossian and Lilian Thuram with France in 1998 and Júnior with Brazil in 2002
  - UEFA European Football Championship: **1** – Lilian Thuram with France in 2000
  - Copa América: **2** – Zé Maria and Márcio Amoroso with Brazil in 1997
  - FIFA Confederations Cup: **1** – Zé Maria with Brazil in 1997
- Players who have appeared for the Italy while with the club: **30**

	Name	Years	Caps	Goals
1	Alberto Di Chiara	1992–1993	7	0
2	Daniele Zoratto	1993	1	0
3	Antonio Benarrivo	1993–1997	23	0
4	Gianfranco Zola	1993–1996	23	7
5	Alessandro Melli	1993	2	0
6	Lorenzo Minotti	1994–1995	8	0
7	Luigi Apolloni	1994–1996	15	1
8	Dino Baggio	1994–1999	40	1
9	Roberto Mussi	1994–1996	6	0
10	Luca Bucci	1994–1995	3	0
11	Massimo Crippa	1994–1996	5	1
12	Fabio Cannavaro	1995–2002	61	0
13	Enrico Chiesa	1996–1999	13	5
14	Gianluigi Buffon	1997–2001	20	0
15	Diego Fuser	1998–2000	11	3
16	Paolo Vanoli	1999–2000	2	1
17	Marco Di Vaio	2001–2002	4	0
18	Luigi Sartor	2002	1	0
19	Matteo Ferrari	2002–2004	11	0
20	Marco Marchionni	2003–2006	2	0
21	Marcello Castellini	2003	1	0
22	Simone Barone	2004	1	0
23	Daniele Bonera	2004–2006	8	0
24	Alberto Gilardino	2004–2005	6	2
25	Daniele Galloppa	2009	1	0
26	Luca Antonelli	2010	2	0
27	Sebastian Giovinco	2011–2012	10	0
28	Marco Parolo	2013–2014	5	0
29	Gabriel Paletta	2014	3	0
30	Antonio Cassano	2014	4	0

Antonio Mirante has been called up to the squad, but is yet to play for the national team as a Parma player, while Fabio Cannavaro captained Italy 5 times as a Parma player.

=== Transfers ===
==== Highest transfer fees paid ====
Parma's record signing is Hidetoshi Nakata, who signed for the club from Roma in 2001. It remains the highest fee paid for an Asian player in the history of the game.

	Name	Year	Club	Fee
1	(Japan) Hidetoshi Nakata	2001	(Italy) Roma	€32,200,000
2	(Brazil) Márcio Amoroso	2000	(Italy) Udinese	€27,000,000
3	(Socialist Federal Republic of Yugoslavia) Savo Milošević	2000	(Spain) Zaragoza	€25,000,000
4	(France) Sébastien Frey	2001	(Italy) Internazionale	€21,000,000
5	(Argentina) Juan Sebastián Verón	1998	(Italy) Sampdoria	€17,500,000
6	(Brazil) Evanilson	2001	(Germany) Borussia Dortmund	€17,000,000
6	(Portugal) Sérgio Conceição	2000	(Italy) Lazio	€17,000,000
8	(Brazil) Adriano	2002	(Italy) Internazionale	€12,800,000
9	(Italy) Alberto Gilardino	2002	(Italy) Hellas Verona	€12,000,000
10	(Belgium) Mandela Keita	2024	(Belgium) Royal Antwerp	€11,900,000

==== Highest transfer fees received ====
The club's record sale came in the summer of 2000, when current Serie A record goalscorer Hernán Crespo moved to Lazio.

	Name	Year	Club	Fee
1	(Argentina) Hernán Crespo	2000	(Italy) Lazio	€55,000,000
2	(Italy) Gianluigi Buffon	2001	(Italy) Juventus	€54,884,000
3	(France) Lilian Thuram	2001	(Italy) Juventus	€36,500,000
4	(Argentina) Juan Sebastián Verón	1999	(Italy) Lazio	€30,000,000
5	(Italy) Giovanni Leoni	2025	(England) Liverpool	€29,450,000
6	(Brazil) Márcio Amoroso	2001	(Germany) Borussia Dortmund	€25,000,000
7	(Italy) Alberto Gilardino	2005	(Italy) Milan	€25,000,000
8	(Italy) Fabio Cannavaro	2002	(Italy) Internazionale	€23,000,000
9	(France) Ange-Yoan Bonny	2025	(Italy) Internazionale	€23,000,000
10	(Argentina) Matías Almeyda	2000	(Italy) Internazionale	€22,100,000

== Managerial records ==
- Longest-serving manager: 7 years – Nevio Scala, 1989–1996
- Most spells as manager: 3 – Pietro Carmignani, 1985 (as caretaker), 2001–2002 and 2003–2004
- Most trophies: 4 – Nevio Scala, 1989–1996

== Team records ==
=== Matches ===
- First Coppa Italia match: Virtus Bologna 1–0 Parma, First Round, 2 April 1922
- First Serie A match: Parma 1–2 Juventus, 9 September 1990
- First European match: CSKA Sofia 0–0 Parma, UEFA Cup First Round, first leg, 19 September 1991

==== Record wins ====
- Record league win: 12–0 v Carrarese, Serie C, 6 June 1943
- Record away league win: 9–0 v Budrio, Serie C, 21 February 1943
- Record Serie A win: 5–0 v Perugia, Serie A, 25 February 2001
- Record European win: 6–0 v Bordeaux, UEFA Cup Quarter-final, second leg, 16 March 1999

==== Record defeats ====
- Record league defeat:

0–7 v Atalanta, Serie B, 17 January 1932
0–7 v Juventus, Serie A, 9 November 2014

- Record home Serie A defeat:

0–4 v Fiorentina, 26 February 2000
0–4 v Roma, 24 September 2006
0–4 v Juventus, 19 December 2020

==== High scoring matches ====
- Highest scoring Serie A match: 6–4 v Livorno, 1 May 2005

==== Runs ====
- Longest winning run in league: 8 matches, 31 May to 25 October 1953
- Longest winning run in Serie A: 7 matches, 11 April to 14 May 2012
- Longest unbeaten run in league: 41 matches, 24 May 2015 to 11 September 2016
- Longest unbeaten run in Serie A: 17 matches, 10 November 2013 to 23 March 2014
- Longest winning run away from home in Serie A: 5 matches, 11 January to 16 March 2014
- Longest run without victory in league: 10 matches, 4 November 2006 to 13 January 2007

==== Wins/draws/losses in a season ====
- Most wins in a league season: 28, 2015–16
- Most home wins in a league season: 15, 1951–52
- Most away wins in a league season: 15, 2015–16
- Most wins in a Serie A season: 18, 1994–95, 1996–97
- Most defeats in a Serie A season: 24, 2014–15
- Fewest wins in a Serie A season: 6, 2014–15
- Fewest defeats in a Serie A season: 7, 1991–92, 1994–95, 1996–97 and 1997–98

=== Goals ===
- Most goals in a league season: 89, 1941–42
- Most goals scored in a Serie A season: 58, 2013–14
- Most goals conceded in a Serie A season: 75, 2014–15
- Fewest goals scored in a Serie A season: 32, 1991–92
- Fewest goals conceded in a Serie A season: 25, 1996–97
- Most individual scorers in a Serie A season: 17, 2011–12

=== Points ===
- Most points in a league season: 94, 2015–16
- Most points in a Serie A season: 63, 1994–95 and 1996–97
- Fewest points in a Serie A season: 26, 2014–15 (Note: Parma was docked 7 points for failing to pay players' wages, so the actual total was 19 points.)

=== Club awards ===
- World Team of the Year: 24% of the vote, 1993.

== See also ==
- Italian football club records & statistics
