= 2003 Ballon d'Or =

Annual association football award event in France

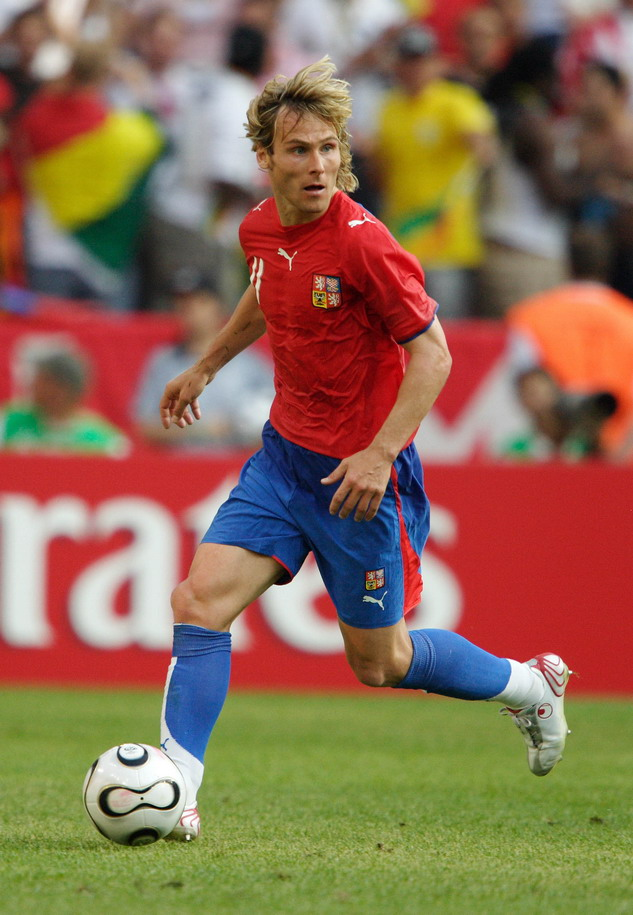
- 2003 Ballon d'Or winner, Pavel Nedvěd
- Date: 22 December 2003
- Presented by: France Football

Highlights
- Won by: (Czech Republic) Pavel Nedvěd (1st award)
- Website: ballondor.com

The 2003 Ballon d'Or (lit. '2003 Golden Ball'), given to the best football player in Europe as judged by a panel of sports journalists from UEFA member countries, was awarded to the Czech midfielder Pavel Nedvěd on 22 December 2003.

Nedvěd was the second Czech player to win the award after Josef Masopust (1962). Gianluigi Buffon (Italy) was the top ranked goalkeeper in the list, in ninth place. Paolo Maldini (Italy) was the best ranked defender in third place, while Thierry Henry (France) was the top forward, in second place.

== Rankings ==
On 11 November 2003, the shortlist of 50 male players compiled by a group of experts from France Football was announced.

There were 52 voters, from Albania, Andorra, Armenia, Austria, Azerbaijan, Belarus, Belgium, Bosnia and Herzegovina, Bulgaria, Croatia, Cyprus, Czech Republic, Denmark, England, Estonia, Faroe Islands, Finland, France, Georgia, Germany, Greece, Hungary, Iceland, Israel, Italy, Kazakhstan, Latvia, Liechtenstein, Lithuania, Luxembourg, Macedonia, Malta, Moldova, the Netherlands, Northern Ireland, Norway, Poland, Portugal, Republic of Ireland, Romania, Russia, San Marino, Scotland, Slovakia, Slovenia, Spain, Sweden, Switzerland, Turkey, Ukraine, Wales and Yugoslavia. Each picked a first (5pts), second (4pts), third (3pts), fourth (2pts) and fifth choice (1pt).

=== Voted players ===
Rank	Player	Nationality	Club(s)	Total	Votes by place					Votes
Rank	Player	Nationality	Club(s)	Total	1st	2nd	3rd	4th	5th	Votes
1st	Pavel Nedvěd	Czech Republic	(Italy) Juventus	190	27	9	2	6	1	45
2nd	Thierry Henry	France	(England) Arsenal	128	8	9	14	4	2	37
3rd	Paolo Maldini	Italy	(Italy) Milan	123	7	13	7	4	7	38
4th	Andriy Shevchenko	Ukraine	(Italy) Milan	67	3	8	3	4	3	21
5th	Zinedine Zidane	France	(Spain) Real Madrid	64	4	1	5	9	7	26
6th	Ruud van Nistelrooy	Netherlands	(England) Manchester United	61	1	4	5	11	3	24
7th	Raúl	Spain	(Spain) Real Madrid	32	1	2	4	1	5	13
8th	Roberto Carlos	Brazil	(Spain) Real Madrid	27	1	3	3	-	1	8
9th	Gianluigi Buffon	Italy	(Italy) Juventus	19	-	1	2	3	3	9
10th	David Beckham	England	(England) Manchester United (Spain) Real Madrid	17	-	2	1	2	2	7
11th	Ronaldo	Brazil	(Spain) Real Madrid	11	-	-	1	2	4	7
12th	Henrik Larsson	Sweden	(Scotland) Celtic	6	-	-	2	-	-	2
13th	Alessandro Del Piero	Italy	(Italy) Juventus	4	-	-	1	-	1	2
13th	Dida	Brazil	(Italy) Milan	4	-	-	1	-	1	2
13th	Roy Makaay	Netherlands	(Spain) Deportivo La Coruña (Germany) Bayern Munich	4	-	-	1	-	1	2
13th	Alessandro Nesta	Italy	(Italy) Milan	4	-	-	-	2	-	2
13th	Deco	Portugal	(Portugal) Porto	4	-	-	-	-	4	4
18th	Nihat Kahveci	Turkey	(Spain) Real Sociedad	3	-	-	-	1	1	2
18th	Francesco Totti	Italy	(Italy) Roma	3	-	-	-	1	1	2
20th	Michael Ballack	Germany	(Germany) Bayern Munich	2	-	-	-	1	-	1
20th	Zlatan Ibrahimović	Sweden	(Netherlands) Ajax	2	-	-	-	1	-	1
22nd	Filippo Inzaghi	Italy	(Italy) Milan	1	-	-	-	-	1	1
22nd	Jan Koller	Czech Republic	(Germany) Borussia Dortmund	1	-	-	-	-	1	1
22nd	Adrian Mutu	Romania	(Italy) Parma (England) Chelsea	1	-	-	-	-	1	1
22nd	Ronaldinho	Brazil	(France) Paris Saint-Germain (Spain) Barcelona	1	-	-	-	-	1	1
22nd	Francesco Toldo	Italy	(Italy) Internazionale	1	-	-	-	-	1	1

=== Non-voted players ===
The following 24 men were originally in contention for the 2003 Ballon d’Or, but did not receive any votes:

Player	Nationality	Club(s)
Pablo Aimar	Argentina	(Spain) Valencia
Sol Campbell	England	(England) Arsenal
Iker Casillas	Spain	(Spain) Real Madrid
Cristian Chivu	Romania	(Netherlands) Ajax (Italy) Roma
Samuel Eto'o	Cameroon	(Spain) Mallorca
Luís Figo	Portugal	(Spain) Real Madrid
Giovane Élber	Brazil	(Germany) Bayern Munich (France) Lyon
Ludovic Giuly	France	(France) Monaco
Oliver Kahn	Germany	(Germany) Bayern Munich
Patrick Kluivert	Netherlands	(Spain) Barcelona
Darko Kovačević	Serbia and Montenegro	(Spain) Real Sociedad
Claude Makélélé	France	(Spain) Real Madrid (England) Chelsea
Michael Owen	England	(England) Liverpool
Pauleta	Portugal	(France) Bordeaux (France) Paris Saint-Germain
Robert Pires	France	(England) Arsenal
Míchel Salgado	Spain	(Spain) Real Madrid
Paul Scholes	England	(England) Manchester United
Lilian Thuram	France	(Italy) Juventus
Hatem Trabelsi	Tunisia	(Netherlands) Ajax
David Trezeguet	France	(Italy) Juventus
Patrick Vieira	France	(England) Arsenal
Christian Vieri	Italy	(Italy) Internazionale
Sylvain Wiltord	France	(England) Arsenal
Gianluca Zambrotta	Italy	(Italy) Juventus
