= Paolo Maldini =

Italian association football player (born 1968)

Paolo Maldini OMRI
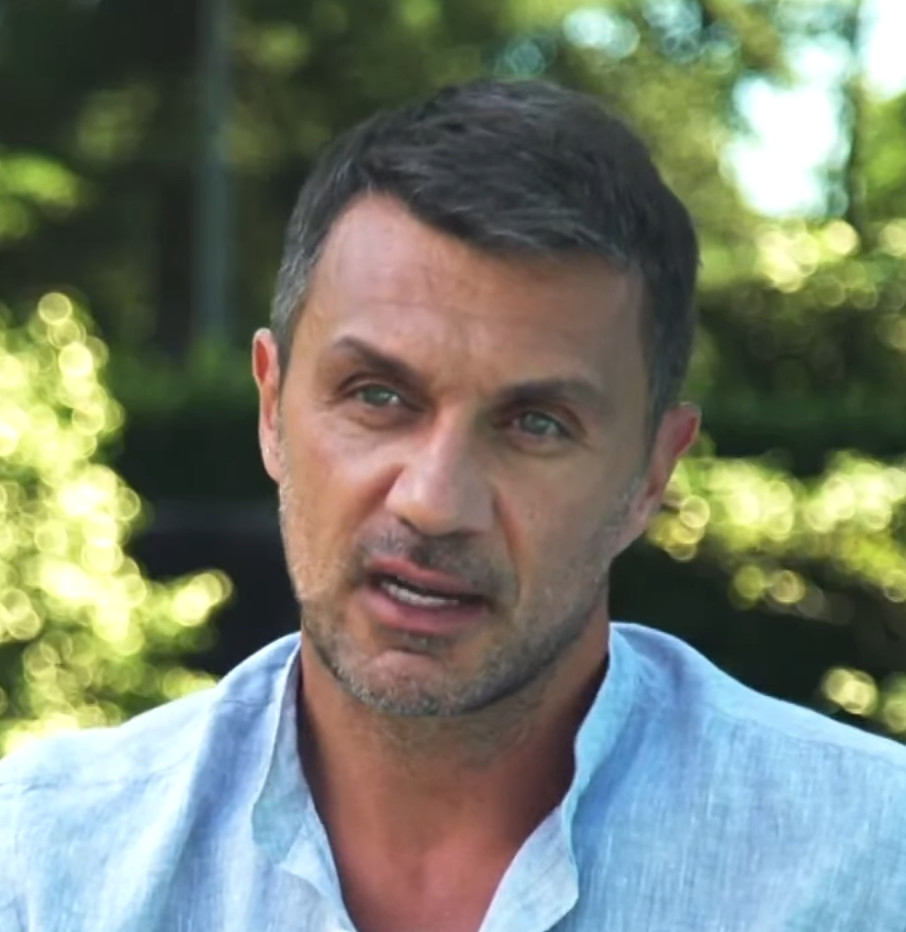
- Maldini in 2018

Personal information
- Full name: Paolo Cesare Maldini
- Date of birth: 26 June 1968 (age 58)
- Place of birth: Milan, Italy
- Height: 1.86 m (6 ft 1 in)
- Positions: Left-back; centre-back

Youth career
- 1978–1984: Milan

Senior career*
Years	Team	Apps	(Gls)
1984–2009	Milan	647	(29)

International career
1986–1988	Italy U21	12	(5)
1988–2002	Italy	126	(7)
Medal record
Men's football
Representing Italy
FIFA World Cup
Runner-up	1994 United States
Third place	1990 Italy
UEFA European Championship
Runner-up	2000 Belgium–Netherlands
UEFA European Under-21 Championship
Runner-up	1986
- * Club domestic league appearances and goals

Paolo Cesare Maldini (Italian pronunciation: [ˈpaːolo malˈdiːni]; born 26 June 1968) is an Italian football executive and former professional footballer who most recently served as the president of the technical sector of the Italian Football Federation. He spent his entire career playing as a left-back or as a centre-back for AC Milan and the Italy national team. He is widely regarded as one of the greatest players of all time. As the Milan and Italy captain for many years, he was nicknamed "Il Capitano". Maldini held the record for appearances in Serie A (647), until he was surpassed by Gianluigi Buffon in 2020. He also holds the joint-record for most European Cup/UEFA Champions League final appearances (8) alongside Paco Gento. From 2018 to 2023 he worked at AC Milan as sporting director and is a co-owner of USL Championship club Miami FC.

Maldini was a one-club man, spending all 25 seasons of his playing career in Serie A with Milan and retiring at the age of 41 in 2009. He won 26 trophies with Milan: the European Cup/UEFA Champions League five times, seven Serie A titles, one Coppa Italia, five Supercoppa Italiana titles, five European/UEFA Super Cups, two Intercontinental Cups, and one FIFA Club World Cup. Maldini won the Best Defender award at the UEFA Club Football Awards at the age of 39, as well as the Serie A Defender of the Year Award in 2004. Following his retirement, Milan retired his number 3 shirt.

Maldini made his debut for Italy in 1988 and played for 14 years before retiring in 2002 with 7 goals and 126 caps. He held the record for appearances with Italy, until he was surpassed by Fabio Cannavaro and Gianluigi Buffon. Maldini captained Italy for eight years and held the record for appearances as Italy's captain with 75, until he was again surpassed by Cannavaro and Buffon. With Italy, Maldini took part in four FIFA World Cups and three UEFA European Championships. Although he did not win a tournament, he reached the final of the 1994 World Cup and Euro 2000 and the semi-final of the 1990 World Cup and Euro 1988. He was elected into the all-star teams for all of these tournaments.

Maldini came second to George Weah for FIFA World Player of the Year in 1995. He also came third in the Ballon d'Or rankings in 1994 and 2003. In 2002, he was named in the FIFA World Cup Dream Team. In 2004, Pelé named him in the FIFA 100 list of the world's greatest living players. He was ranked 21st in World Soccer magazine's list of the 100 greatest players of the 20th century. He was also named in the Ballon d'Or Dream Team in 2020. Maldini held the record for most appearances in UEFA Club competitions, with 174, until he was surpassed by Iker Casillas in 2017. He holds the record for appearances with Milan (902) and is one of the few players to have made over 1,000 career appearances (the first Italian to achieve the feat, since the time matches are recorded). In December 2012, he was inducted into the Italian Football Hall of Fame.

== Club career ==
=== 1978–1987: Youth career, AC Milan senior debut and early professional career ===
In 1978, at the age of 10, Maldini had his first tryout for AC Milan youth academy. Before that, he had only played street football. He successfully played the test game as a right midfielder or winger in the 4–4–2 formation and was accepted into his age group's squad. He would continue playing in this position until the age of 14, when he was moved to right full-back. Due to him being good on the ball with both of his feet, he would sometimes be fielded on the left side as well.

Maldini won the Coppa Italia Primavera with the Milan Youth side during the 1984–85 season, and he made his league debut for Milan under manager Nils Liedholm during the same season on 20 January 1985, replacing the injured Sergio Battistini in a match against Udinese at age 16. It was his only league appearance of the campaign, but he was immediately made a member of the starting eleven the following season, at age 17, at right-back, being handed the number 3 shirt, which had previously also belonged to his father, Cesare. Maldini also made his Coppa Italia debut in 1985, on 21 August, while his debut in European competition also came later that same year, on 18 September. He scored the first of his 29 goals in Serie A on 4 January 1987 in a 1–0 win against Como.

=== 1987–1991: Domestic and international success with The immortals ===
The 1987–88 Scudetto under Arrigo Sacchi marked Maldini's first trophy, and the first of seven league titles, with the club. Nicknamed "The Immortals", Sacchi's Milan side is remembered for including the Dutch trio of Frank Rijkaard, Ruud Gullit and Marco van Basten, as well as the Italian midfielders Carlo Ancelotti, Roberto Donadoni (and later Demetrio Albertini), and a strong defensive lineup. Under Sacchi and later Fabio Capello, Maldini formed with long-timers Franco Baresi, Alessandro Costacurta, Mauro Tassotti, as well as Filippo Galli, Stefano Nava and later Christian Panucci, one of football's strongest defensive quartets of all time. (Note: See) During the 1987–88 Serie A season, Milan only conceded 14 goals, finishing with the best defence in Italy, as they went on to win the Serie A title. Maldini went on to win the 1988 Supercoppa Italiana with Milan the following season, and followed up this trophy with back to back European Cup titles in 1988–89 and 1989–90, while Milan finished in third and in second place in Serie A during those respective seasons. On 19 February 1989, Maldini made his 100th appearance in Serie A.

Milan reached the final of the 1989–90 Coppa Italia, losing out to Juventus. Milan also managed to capture successive European Super Cup titles in 1989 and 1990, as well as successive Intercontinental Cup titles, once again in 1989 and 1990. The following season, in Sacchi's final season with the club, Milan were eliminated in the quarter-finals of the European Cup by eventual finalists Marseille, and finished second in Serie A, behind Sampdoria, once again with the best defence in the league, conceding only 19 goals. Milan reached the semi-finals of the Coppa Italia, losing out to eventual champions Roma. In 1989, Maldini was awarded the Bravo Award, as the best under-23 player in European Competitions.

=== 1991–1996: Continued success with The invincibles ===
Under Sacchi's replacement, Fabio Capello, Milan continued to be a dominant force in Italy and in Europe. Maldini was also part of Milan's undefeated Serie A team, which won the championship in the 1991–92 season; in total, Milan went unbeaten for an Italian record of 58 league matches, earning the nickname "The Invincibles". This championship was Milan's first of three consecutive Serie A titles under Capello in the early 1990s. Maldini helped Milan defend the Serie A title the following season, and reach the first of three consecutive UEFA Champions League finals. Milan lost the 1993 Champions League final in a 1–0 defeat to Marseille. That season, Maldini scored his first goal in European Competitions on 21 October 1992 in a 1–0 Champions League win against Slovan Bratislava, and also made his 200th appearance in Serie A on 4 October of the same year. The following season, Milan captured their third consecutive Serie A title, finishing with the best defence in Italy, conceding just 15 goals. Maldini also helped lead Milan to a second consecutive Champions League final, where he helped his team defeat Barcelona. Due to Alessandro Costacurta's suspension and injuries sustained to Franco Baresi, Jean-Pierre Papin and Marco van Basten, Barcelona's "Dream Team", coached by Johan Cruyff, were heavy favourites to win the trophy, with the formidable attacking duo of Romário and Hristo Stoichkov. Despite their key absences, Maldini helped the Milan defence keep a clean sheet and overcome Barcelona 4–0 in the final, with two goals from Daniele Massaro and one each from Dejan Savićević and Marcel Desailly.

After winning his third Champions League title and reaching the 1994 World Cup final, Maldini became the first defender ever to win World Soccer magazine's annual World Player of the Year Award. During his acceptance speech, Maldini called his milestone "a particular matter of pride because defenders generally receive so much less attention from fans and the media than goalscorers. We are more in the engine room rather than taking the glory". He then singled out Milan captain Franco Baresi as a player who "really [deserved] to receive the sort of award I have received". Maldini also placed third in the 1994 Ballon d'Or, behind Stoichkov and compatriot Roberto Baggio, and fifth in the FIFA World Player of the Year Award.

The following season, Milan and Maldini captured their third consecutive Supercoppa Italiana under Capello, and won the European Super Cup, missing out on the Intercontinental Cup. After three consecutive titles, Milan were unable to retain their Serie A title, although they reached their third consecutive Champions League final, where they were defeated 1–0 by Ajax. Maldini came second behind future teammate George Weah in the 1995 FIFA World Player of the Year Award for his performances. On 17 February 1995, he made his 300th appearance in Serie A. Maldini was able to capture his fifth Serie A title, and his fourth under Capello, the following season.

=== 1996–2001: Assuming the captaincy, struggles, and 1999 Serie A title ===
Following Capello's departure, and the ageing and retirement of several key players, Milan suffered disappointing results during the next few seasons, undergoing several managerial changes. Milan lost the Supercoppa Italiana to Fiorentina in 1996, and failed to qualify for European competitions for two consecutive seasons, as well as suffering a group stage elimination in the 1996–97 Champions League. Following Franco Baresi's and Mauro Tassotti's retirement after the 1996–97 season, Maldini was appointed Milan's captain. Despite the difficulties Milan encountered during this period, through Maldini's leadership, they reached the Coppa Italia final in 1998, losing to Lazio, and won the 1998–99 Serie A title under Alberto Zaccheroni, finishing one point ahead of Lazio. He made his 400th Serie A appearance on 25 April 1999. In the 1999–2000 season, Milan lost the Supercoppa Italiana against Parma, finished third in Serie A and finished bottom of their Champions League group. Milan were eliminated in the second round of the Champions League the next season and finished in sixth place in Serie A, failing to qualify for the Champions League, and participated in the UEFA Cup the following season.

=== 2001–2007: New era of success ===
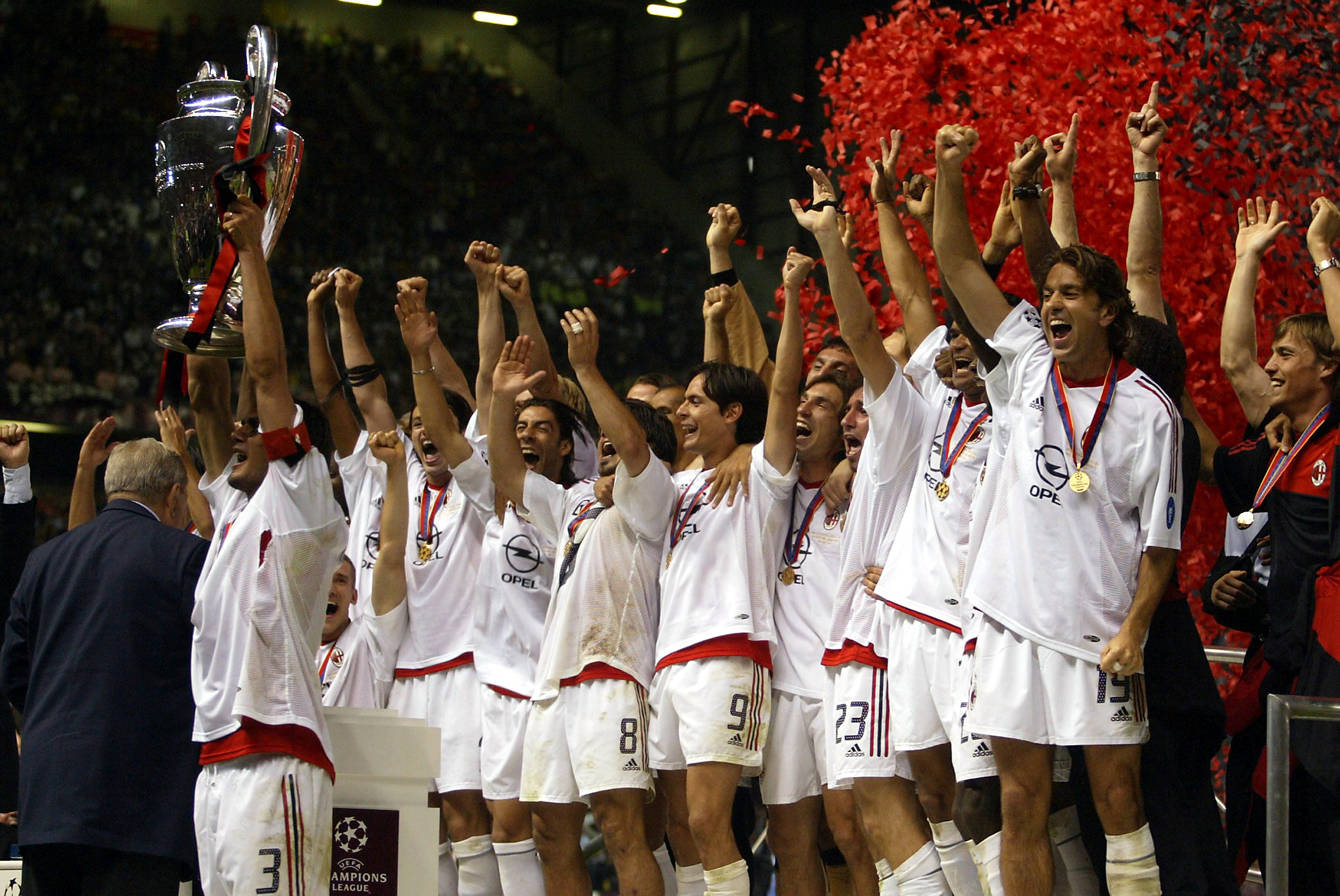
Maldini lifting the European Cup for Milan after winning the 2003 UEFA Champions League final

Milan again became a dominant force in Italy and in Europe under Carlo Ancelotti. In the 2001–02 season, Milan finished in fourth place, qualifying for the Champions League, and also reached their best ever finish in the UEFA Cup, losing in the semi-finals. In 2002, Maldini was awarded the Premio Nazionale Carriera Esemplare "Gaetano Scirea", for his career achievements and personality. The following season, Maldini lined up with Alessandro Nesta, Alessandro Costacurta and Cafu, who, along with Jaap Stam during the 2004–05 season, formed a formidable defensive lineup in Italy and in Europe. Milan finished third in Serie A, but Maldini won the first Coppa Italia of his career, defeating Roma in the final. On 15 March 2003, he made his 500th appearance in Serie A.

Milan won the 2002–03 Champions League with Maldini as their captain for the first time in his career, in the first all-Italian final, against Juventus, on 28 May 2003 at Old Trafford. Maldini helped Milan keep a clean sheet, as they defeated Juventus 3–2 on penalties after a 0–0 deadlock following extra time. On that day, it was exactly 40 years since his father, Cesare, had also lifted the European Cup trophy as Milan's captain, also in England. He and his father are only one of three other father-son pairs to have also done so; the others being Manuel and Manolo Sanchís of Real Madrid, and Carles and Sergio Busquets of Barcelona. Maldini was elected Man of the Match and was named in the UEFA Team of the Year for the first time in his career.

The following season, Milan were defeated by Juventus on penalties in the Supercoppa Italiana, and in the Intercontinental Cup final by Boca Juniors, once again on penalties, but managed to defeat Porto to capture yet another UEFA Super Cup. Maldini placed third in the 2003 Ballon d'Or for the second time in his career. Maldini went on to captain Milan to win the Serie A title that season, with a record 82 points, whilst Milan were eliminated in the semi-finals of the Coppa Italia by Lazio, and in the quarter-finals of the Champions League by Deportivo de La Coruña. In April 2004, Maldini placed tenth on the UEFA Golden Jubilee Poll, an online UEFA survey, which was organised to commemorate the best European footballers of the past 50 years. Maldini was the second-highest placed Italian after Dino Zoff. Maldini was also included in the FIFA 100 list in 2004, which was a selection of the 125 greatest living footballers, chosen by Pelé. Following his Series A-winning performances, Maldini was elected to be the Serie A Defender of the Year in 2004 at the Italian footballing Awards.

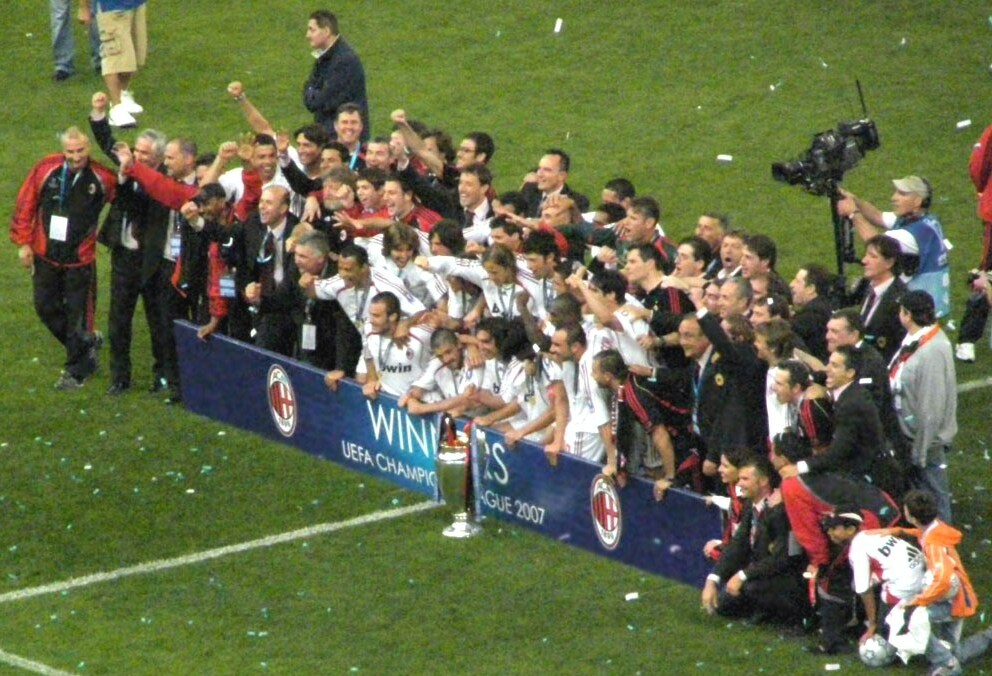
Maldini celebrating the 2007 UEFA Champions League triumph with his Milan teammates. At 38, he was the oldest captain to lift the trophy.

Maldini began the next season by lifting the 2004 Supercoppa Italiana as captain after Milan defeated Lazio. Milan finished second in Serie A to Juventus that season, and reached the Champions League final, only to lose out on penalties to Liverpool, although Maldini opened the scoring in the first minute. In 2005, Maldini was elected to be a part of the UEFA Team of the Year for the second time in his career, and was also elected to be the part of the FIFPro World XI for the first time in his career. The following season, Milan finished second behind Juventus in Serie A once again, and reached the Champions League semi-finals, only to be defeated by eventual champions Barcelona. Both Juventus and Milan were later deducted points for being involved in the 2006 "Calciopoli" matchfixing scandal, and the title was awarded to Internazionale, while Juventus were relegated, with Milan finishing in third place after the point deduction. During the season, Maldini scored his first and only double of his career, against Reggina. On 25 September 2005, Maldini broke Dino Zoff's Serie A appearance record after playing his 571st league match against Treviso; seven days earlier, he had played his 800th game in all competitions for Milan.

The following season, Maldini helped to captain Milan to a fourth-place finish, despite their point deduction, leading them to obtain a crucial Champions League qualifying spot. Maldini played his 600th Serie A match on 13 May 2007 in a 1–1 draw at Catania. That season, Maldini captained Milan to their third Champions League final in six years, leading them to a 2–1 victory over Liverpool in the final on 23 May 2007 in Athens, avenging their defeat from 2005. At age 38, Maldini became the oldest captain to lift the Champions League trophy. Maldini participated in eight Champions League finals during his career, which is equalled only by Francisco Gento of Real Madrid; Maldini lifted the trophy five times, twice as captain. In an interview with ESPN aired prior to the 2007 final, Maldini labeled the 2005 Champions League final as the worst moment of his career. A match where he scored the fastest-ever goal in a European Cup final after 51 seconds and became the oldest player ever to score in a final, Milan lost on penalties to Liverpool after leading 3–0 at half-time. Maldini was elected the UEFA Club Defender of the Year for his 2007 performances.

In 2007, after Milan won the UEFA Super Cup against Sevilla (although Maldini did not appear in the match), Maldini became the first European captain to lift the FIFA Club World Cup after defeating Boca Juniors on 16 December. He announced his plans to retire at the end of the 2007–08 season, saying that he would do so with "no regrets". Following Milan's elimination from the Champions League by Arsenal in March, however, Maldini stated that he would possibly delay his retirement for at least a further year. He signed an extension on 6 June that kept him at Milan for the 2008–09 season.

=== 2008–2009: Final years and retirement ===
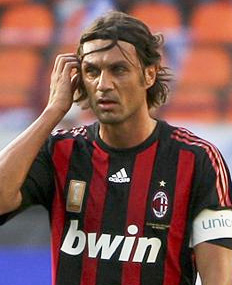
Maldini playing for Milan in 2008

On 16 February 2008, in a match against Parma at the Stadio Ennio Tardini, Maldini came on for defender Marek Jankulovski to make his 1,000th professional career appearance, of which 861 were with Milan, 12 with the Italy under-21 side, 1 with the Italian Olympic team and 126 with the Italy senior team. In European football, only the English goalkeeper Peter Shilton had collected more appearances at the time: 1,390 between 1966 and 1997. Maldini played his last game in the Champions League on 4 March 2008, a 2–0 loss at the San Siro in the last 16 against Arsenal which eliminated Milan from the 2007–08 Champions League. In 2008, Maldini was awarded the FIFA Order of Merit, as well as the Premio Internazionale Giacinto Facchetti, which is awarded to a player who was demonstrated both skill and fair play throughout his career.

On 18 April 2009, Maldini announced that he would retire at the end of the 2008–09 season. On 17 May 2009, in the Stadio Friuli, Maldini played his 900th official match for Milan in a league game against Udinese. Maldini's last match in San Siro was on 24 May, a 3–2 loss against Roma, and was given a standing ovation by the fans. There was a small controversy, however, when the Milan Ultras fans known as Brigate Rossonere protested against Maldini as he said goodbye. His last appearance for Milan, and his last game as an active player, was a 2–0 win against Fiorentina on 31 May 2009 in the last match of the Serie A season. This win meant Milan finished in third place and qualified for the following season's Champions League. Maldini was once again given a standing ovation by the fans. As they had previously done with Franco Baresi's number 6 shirt, Milan retired Maldini's number 3 shirt, but stated that it will be bequeathed to one of his sons if one of them were to make the club's senior team.

On 28 August 2009 in Monte Carlo, Maldini was awarded a prize for his career by UEFA during the draw for the group stage of the 2009–10 Champions League. On 17 November 2009, Spanish sports newspaper Marca awarded Maldini the "Marca Leyenda" prize for his career and achievements.

== International career ==
=== Early career and 1990 World Cup ===
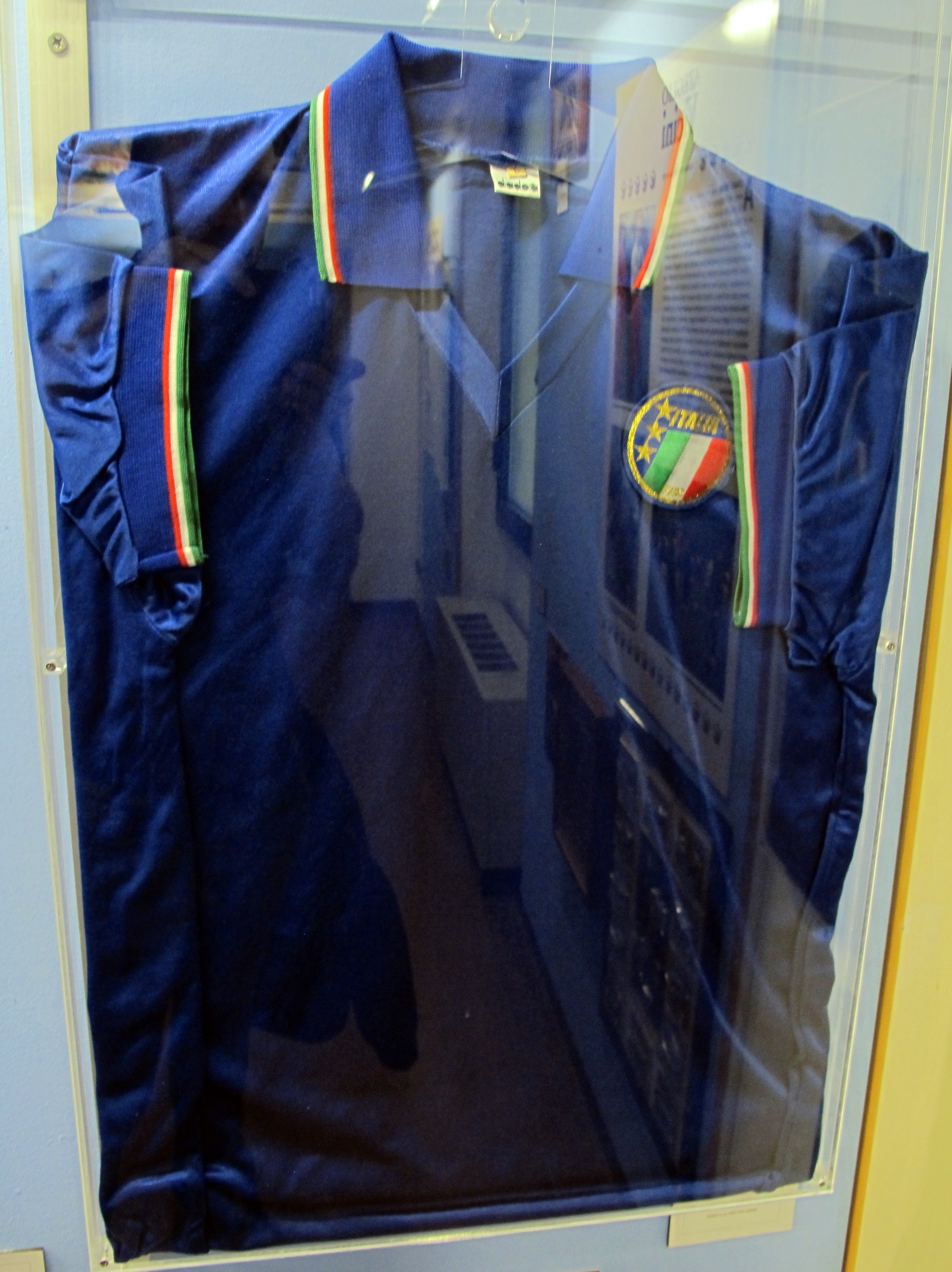
Maldini's Italy jersey from the 1990 FIFA World Cup, located in the Football Museum in Florence

In 1986, Maldini was called up by his father Cesare Maldini to the Italian under-21 national team, and made his debut for the team on 12 November of that year, in a 0–0 draw against Austria; he earned 12 caps and scored five goals in two years with the azzurrini, with his first goal coming on 11 February 1987, in a 2–1 win against Portugal. Maldini was also member of the under-21 team that finished runners-up to Spain in the 1986 UEFA European Under-21 Championship. Two years later, he also featured for the under-21 team that was eliminated in the first round against eventual winners France in the 1988 UEFA European Under-21 Championship.

Maldini made his senior debut for the Italy senior team at age 19 on 31 March 1988 in a 1–1 friendly draw against Yugoslavia in Split, and made one appearance for the Italy Olympic squad on 28 October 1987, although he was not part of the team that finished in fourth place at the 1988 Olympics. Maldini featured in all four of Italy's games at UEFA Euro 1988, where they reached the semi-finals, losing to the Soviet Union. In the opening match of the tournament on 10 June, a 1–1 draw against hosts West Germany, he became the youngest player ever to feature for Italy at the UEFA European Championship, at the age of 19 years and 350 days.

Maldini participated in his first World Cup in 1990 on home soil, appearing in all seven Italy matches. He helped Italy to win five consecutive games and was a starting member of the defence that kept a FIFA World Cup record of five consecutive clean sheets. The Italian defence eventually conceded an equalising goal in the semi-final match against Carlos Bilardo's Argentina, after going a World Cup record total of 518 minutes without conceding. Following two periods of extra time, in which neither team was able to score, Italy lost out to Argentina on penalties. Italy eventually placed third after defeating England 2–1 in the third-place final match, and finishing the tournament with the best defence having conceded two goals throughout the entire World Cup. Maldini was elected to be part of the Team of the Tournament.

=== 1994 World Cup final and appointment to captaincy ===
Maldini's first international goal came in his 44th career match, in a 2–0 friendly win over Mexico in Florence on 20 January 1993. Maldini was part of the Italy squad that participated in the 1992 U.S. Cup, finishing in second place in the friendly tournament, behind the host nation. Italy failed to qualify for Euro 1992, finishing second in their group behind the Soviet Union, but qualified for the 1994 World Cup, where Maldini was named vice-captain for Italy. During the 1994 World Cup in the United States, Maldini played in all seven of Italy's matches, and deputised for the injured Franco Baresi in the matches against Mexico, Nigeria, Spain and Bulgaria, keeping a clean sheet in the group match against Norway. Maldini led the Italian defence to the final, playing both as a centre-back and as a full-back, due to the absences of his Milan and Italy defensive teammates Baresi, due to injury, Mauro Tassotti, due to suspension after the quarter-finals, and Alessandro Costacurta, who was suspended for the final. Maldini helped Italy keep a clean sheet in the final against favourites Brazil as the team eventually lost on penalties. As in 1990, Maldini was named in the Team of the Tournament, 32 years after his father Cesare received the same honour at the 1962 World Cup.

Italy’s goalkeeper: easiest job in Europe.

— Nike slogan accompanied with an image of Maldini which appeared on billboards prior to Euro 96.

After Franco Baresi's international retirement in 1994, Maldini was appointed the team's full-time captain. A disappointing Euro 1996 campaign in England saw Italy eliminated in the group stage with four points, in a group which contained the two eventual finalists of the tournament, Germany and the Czech Republic. Maldini played in all three of Italy's group matches.

The 1998 World Cup in France saw Italy start strongly, topping their group. Maldini played in all five of Italy's matches, and started the play that led to Christian Vieri's opening goal in Italy's first match against Chile, which ended in a 2–2 draw. Maldini, partnering with Alessandro Costacurta, Fabio Cannavaro, Alessandro Nesta and Giuseppe Bergomi, also helped Italy to keep clean sheets in the second group match against Cameroon, the round of 16 match Norway and France in the quarter-finals, but Italy eventually went out of the tournament to the hosts and eventual champions on penalties, for the third consecutive time in a World Cup.

=== Euro 2000 final and fourth World Cup ===
Maldini made his 100th appearance for Italy on 28 April 1999, in a 0–0 friendly away draw against Croatia, under manager Dino Zoff. The following year, Italy reached the final of Euro 2000, but lost once again to defending World Cup champions France in extra time. Maldini played in all six of Italy's matches during the tournament. Italy topped their group, winning every match, and Maldini, starting alongside Fabio Cannavaro and Alessandro Nesta, helped the Italian defence to concede only two goals en route to the final, keeping clean sheets against co-hosts Belgium in the group stage, Romania in the quarter-finals and co-hosts the Netherlands in the semi-finals. A ten-man Italy advanced to the final on penalties after a 0–0 draw with the Dutch following extra time. Although Maldini missed his penalty, Italy won the shootout 3–1. Italy were leading 1–0 in the final until Sylvain Wiltord equalised in the final minute of stoppage time. David Trezeguet scored the golden goal in the 103rd minute, in extra time. In all of the three UEFA European Championships in which Maldini participated, he was elected to be part of the team of the tournament for his performances.

On 7 October 2000, in a 3–0 win over Romania in Milan in a 2002 World Cup qualifier, Maldini overtook Dino Zoff to become Italy's most capped player of all time with his 113th senior international appearance for Italy. Maldini played in his fourth World Cup, and his second as captain, in the 2002 World Cup in Korea and Japan. He helped Italy keep a clean sheet in their opening win against Ecuador, and played in all four of Italy's matches. Italy disappointed in the remaining group matches, but went on to the knockout round as the second placed team of their group. On 18 June, immediately after a ten-man Italy were controversially eliminated in the round of sixteen, by a golden goal, to co-hosts South Korea, Maldini retired from international football, at the age of 34, as Italy's most capped player. He scored seven international goals, all coming in home games. He spent over half of his 16 years as an international as team captain, wearing the armband a record 74 times, until he was overtaken by Cannavaro, and subsequently Buffon. Despite his performances for his country, Maldini was unable to win a trophy, although he reached the final of both the World Cup and the European Championship. Maldini made 23 appearances in World Cups, the third-highest total after Lothar Matthäus, who appeared in 25 matches and Lionel Messi, who appeared in 26 matches. Maldini once held the record for most minutes played at the FIFA World Cup (2,217 minutes), which was also later broken by Messi at the 2022 FIFA World Cup.

In February 2009, Italian head coach Marcello Lippi declared his support for a testimonial match for Maldini, stating that it would give him a chance to play for the Azzurri for a final time. The Italian Football Federation (FIGC) offered him a place in the line-up in a friendly match against Northern Ireland. Maldini, however, rejected the offer, saying that he wanted to part with football in an "official" match.

== After retirement ==
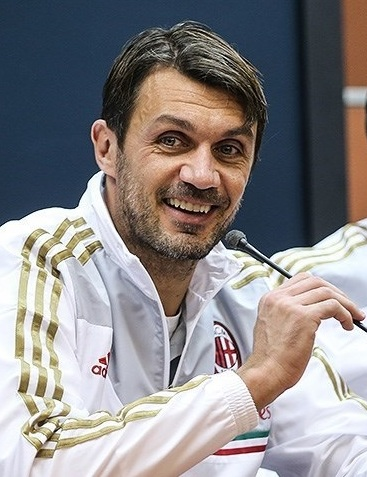
Maldini in 2013

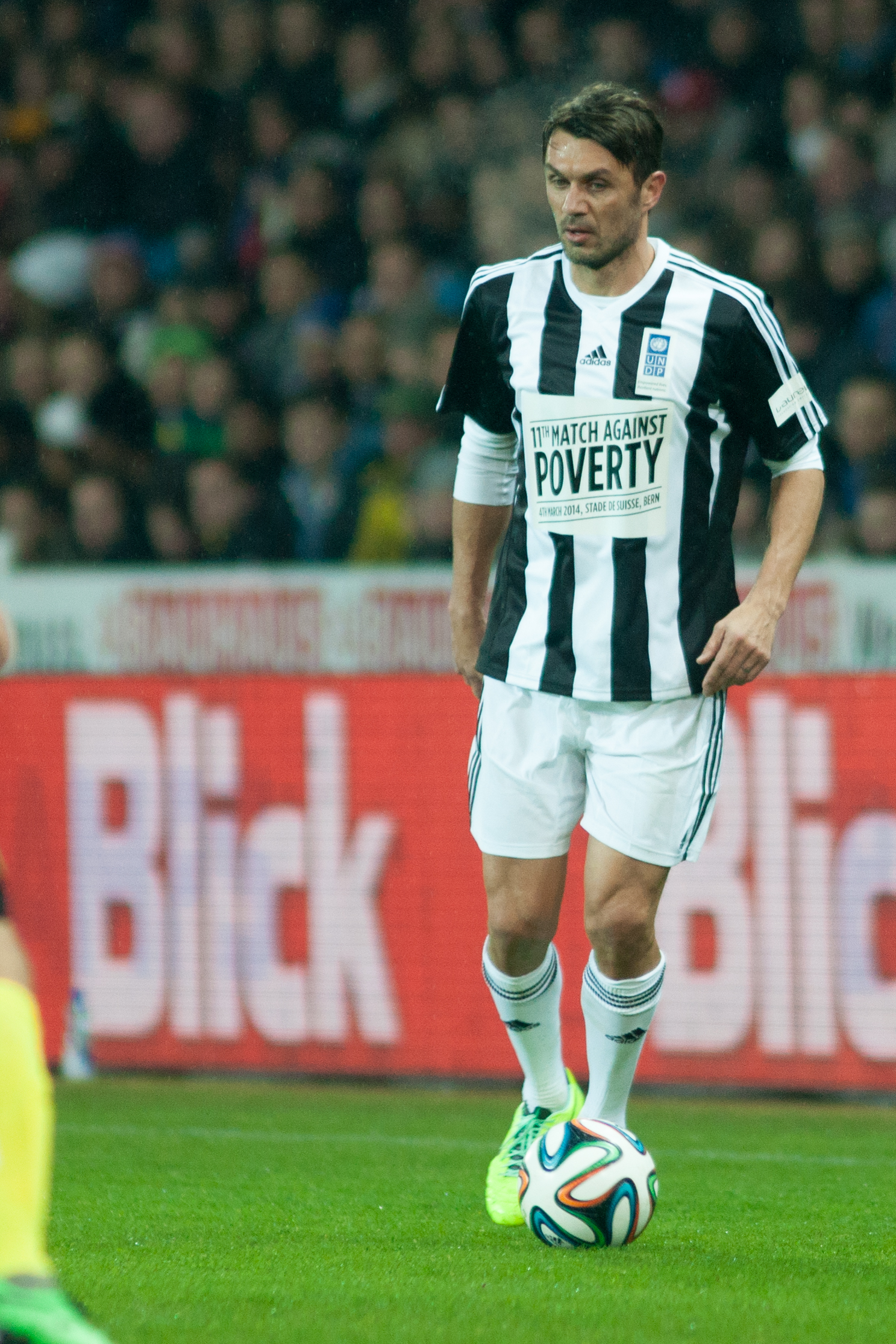
Maldini in a 2014 charity match

Prior to his retirement, Maldini stated that he wouldn't become a coach. He was offered a position that would have reunited him with his former coach Carlo Ancelotti by joining Chelsea as a coach. Maldini had met up with Ancelotti and with Chelsea's owner, Roman Abramovich, to discuss such a possibility. Ancelotti later revealed that Maldini had turned down the offer.

In 2012, Maldini was inducted into the Italian Football Hall of Fame. Maldini played in the 11th Match Against Poverty on 4 March 2014 alongside other footballers such as Ronaldo, Zinedine Zidane, Luís Figo, and Pavel Nedvěd, which was held in Bern, Switzerland, with the proceeds being donated to the recovery efforts in the Philippines after Typhoon Haiyan. On 1 September 2014, Maldini, along with other footballers, took part in the "Match for Peace", which was played at the Stadio Olimpico, Rome, with the proceeds being donated to charity. In May 2015, Maldini became the co-owner of North American Soccer League (NASL) club Miami FC alongside television rights entrepreneur Riccardo Silva, in hope that the club could join the Major League Soccer (MLS) in the future. On 1 May 2016, Maldini became the second player after Southampton's Matthew Le Tissier to receive the One Club Award from La Liga club Athletic Bilbao; he was presented with the prize at half-time, during the club's 2–1 home win over Celta de Vigo, and received a standing ovation from the attending fans.

=== Tennis ===
In June 2017, Maldini and his tennis partner Stefano Landonio qualified for the Aspria Tennis Cup in Milan, a professional tennis tournament on the ATP Challenger Tour, after winning a qualifier in Italy. They were defeated in the first round by Tomasz Bednarek and David Pel by a score of 6–1, 6–1. After the defeat, Maldini stated that it was his last professional tennis match.

== Executive career ==
In August 2018, a few weeks after Milan's changed their ownership to Elliott Management Corporation, Maldini accepted an offer to become the sporting director for the club. This marked his comeback to the club since his retirement from professional football. On 14 June 2019, Maldini was promoted to technical director.

Milan won the 2021–22 Serie A title, the first title since 2011, with Maldini helping sign a number of key players for the victorious squad, namely Théo Hernandez, Pierre Kalulu, Rafael Leão, Olivier Giroud, Fikayo Tomori, and Mike Maignan, the latter of which was named the Best Goalkeeper of the 2021–22 season. In addition, Leão was awarded the MVP of the season.

On 1 July 2022, one day after Maldini's contract expired, it was announced that he would remain Milan's technical director for two more years. On 17 November 2022, he was recognised as Sporting Director of the Year alongside fellow Milan director Frederic Massara at the 2022 Globe Soccer Awards.

On 6 June 2023, Milan terminated his contract.

On 11 July 2026, the Italian Football Federation announced that Maldini had accepted the position of technical director of the Italy national team. On 27 July, just 16 days after becoming technical director, Maldini resigned from his position following the Italian Football Federation's decision to reject the appointment of Andrea Pirlo as the new Italy manager citing links to being brand ambassador to a Russian betting company.

== Player profile ==
=== Style of play ===
"Maldini was the best and toughest defender I ever faced. He had everything: he was a complete defender, who was strong, intelligent, and an excellent man-marker."

— Zlatan Ibrahimović.

Although he played as a left-back for most of his career, Maldini was right-footed and began playing for Milan as a right-back. He was switched to the left-back position by manager Arrigo Sacchi due to Mauro Tassotti occupying the right side for Milan.

"He was one of the best defenders in Champions League history, but what was so impressive about him is that when he was on the ball he didn't look like a defender, but like an elegant midfield player."

— Ronaldinho.

Maldini was renowned for his aerial abilities, sliding tackles, speed, and stamina. He was also an excellent attacker, as he scored and assisted many goals throughout his career. In the final few years of his career, as he lost speed, he was moved to a centre-back position, where he excelled in relying on his experience, aerial abilities, and tackling to stop attackers.

Maldini was renowned for his tactical intelligence and ability to anticipate threats from the opposition. Despite being a precise tackler and an imposing defensive presence, he often avoided committing to challenges when he deemed them unnecessary, preferring to restrict the offensive play of his opponents through his positioning and man-marking. His excellent passing allowed him to play in the sweeper or libero position.

=== Legacy ===
"I always found it very difficult when I came up against Paolo Maldini. He was the best defender I faced over the course of my career. He definitely deserved to win the award FIFA World Player of the Year several times over."

— Ronaldo

Maldini is widely regarded as one of the greatest defenders of all time and is referred to as "an icon and gentleman of the game". He was known for his calm and composed manner on the pitch, his ability to read the game, and his discipline on the pitch, as he only received three red cards throughout his entire career. In a 2002 FIFA poll, Maldini was named in the FIFA World Cup Dream Team.

"Paolo Maldini. When you found him in front of you you knew you would not pass. He was big. He was strong with his head, with his right foot, with his left foot... You needed to put together 15 players to make one like him."

— Roberto Baggio in 2017, when he was asked who was the best defender he had ever faced.

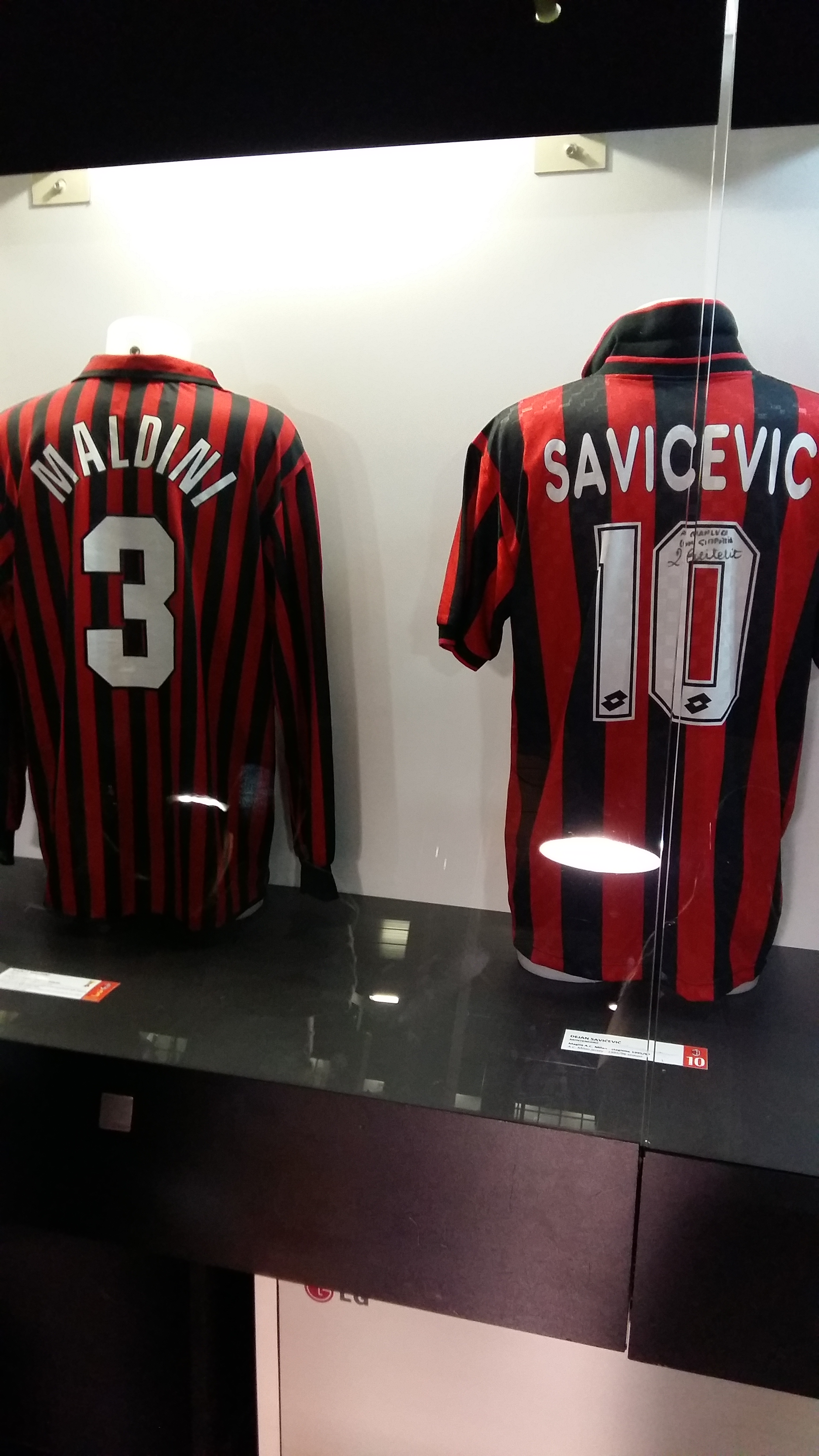
Maldini's Milan jersey next to Dejan Savićević's number 10 in the San Siro museum

Maldini was the first defender to be shortlisted for the FIFA World Player of the Year award, finishing second in 1995. He also finished third in the Ballon d'Or rankings in 1994 and in 2003. In addition to his team success, he also won many individual awards, including the UEFA Defender of the Year, the Serie A Defender of the Year, the Bravo Award, and the World Soccer Player of the Year. He was also named in the UEFA Team of the Year, the FIFPro World XI, the World Cup Team of the Tournament, and the European Championship Team of the Tournament during his career. He was also renowned for his longevity, as he became a starter for Milan as a teenager and remained as a starter until his retirement at the age of 41.

Throughout his career, Maldini was also a leader and captain for Milan and for the Italy national team, earning the nickname "Il Capitano" ("The Captain"). He was renowned for his vocal and commanding presence on the pitch and his ability to motivate his teammates and ensure they remained in position. He made over 1,000 professional appearances and he held the record for appearances in Serie A, until he was surpassed by Gianluigi Buffon in 2020, and he still holds this record for Milan in all competitions. Maldini also appeared in a joint-record eight European Cup/UEFA Champions League finals. With 126 caps for Italy, he held the record for appearances with the national team, until he was surpassed by Fabio Cannavaro in 2009 and by Gianluigi Buffon in 2013. He also held the record for appearances as Italy's captain (75), until again being surpassed by Cannavaro. Maldini has inspired many defenders like Rio Ferdinand, Rafael Márquez and Carles Puyol.

== Media ==
Maldini has appeared in commercials for American sportswear company Nike. He wore Nike Tiempo football boots at the 1994 FIFA World Cup. In 1996, he starred in a Nike commercial titled "Good vs Evil" in a gladiatorial game set in a Roman amphitheatre. Appearing alongside other footballers such as Ronaldo, Eric Cantona, Luís Figo, Patrick Kluivert, and Jorge Campos, they defend "the beautiful game" against a team of demonic warriors. Maldini states, "Maybe they're friendly?" before they begin "destroying evil", with Cantona striking the ball at the warriors.

Maldini has featured in EA Sports' FIFA video game series; he was on the cover of the Italian edition of FIFA: Road to World Cup 98 and was an Ultimate Team Legend in FIFA 14.

== Personal life ==
Maldini was born on 26 June 1968 in Milan to Cesare Maldini and Marisa Luisa De Mezzi. His paternal family was of mixed Italian-Slovenian descent. He has five siblings. In December 1994, he married Venezuelan former model Adriana Fossa. The couple have two sons, Christian (born 14 June 1996) and Daniel (born 11 October 2001), who both played for AC Milan's youth teams. His father Cesare played as a defender and also captained Milan and the Italy national team. Cesare then became a coach and coached his son in the Italy under-21 side, the Italy senior team, and the Milan senior team. On 3 April 2016, his father Cesare died at the age of 84; and his mother Marisa died on 28 July 2016.

Maldini and his former teammate Christian Vieri run a fashion brand named Sweet Years.

Maldini is a Roman Catholic.

== Career statistics ==
=== Club ===
Appearances and goals by club, season and competition
Club	Season	League			Coppa Italia		Europe		Other		Total	
Club	Season	Division	Apps	Goals	Apps	Goals	Apps	Goals	Apps	Goals	Apps	Goals
AC Milan	1984–85	Serie A	1	0	0	0	–		–		1	0
AC Milan	1985–86	Serie A	27	0	6	0	6 (Note: Appearances in UEFA Cup)	0	1 (Note: Appearance in Torneo Estivo del 1986)	0	40	0
AC Milan	1986–87	Serie A	29	1	7	0	–		1 (Note: Appearance in Serie A UEFA Cup play-off)	0	37	1
AC Milan	1987–88	Serie A	26	2	1	0	2	0	–		29	2
AC Milan	1988–89	Serie A	26	0	7	0	7 (Note: Appearances in European Cup)	0	–		40	0
AC Milan	1989–90	Serie A	30	1	6	0	8	0	3 (Note: Two appearances in European Super Cup, one appearance in Intercontinental Cup)	0	47	1
AC Milan	1990–91	Serie A	26	4	3	0	4	0	2 (Note: One appearance in European Super Cup, one appearance in Intercontinental Cup)	0	35	4
AC Milan	1991–92	Serie A	31	3	7	1	–		–		38	4
AC Milan	1992–93	Serie A	31	2	8	0	10 (Note: Appearances in UEFA Champions League)	1	1 (Note: Appearance in Supercoppa Italiana)	0	50	3
AC Milan	1993–94	Serie A	30	1	2	0	10	1	4 (Note: One appearance in Supercoppa Italiana, two appearances in European Super Cup, one appearance in Intercontinental Cup)	0	46	2
AC Milan	1994–95	Serie A	29	2	1	0	11	0	2 (Note: One appearance in European Super Cup, one appearance in Intercontinental Cup)	0	43	2
AC Milan	1995–96	Serie A	30	3	3	0	8	0	–		41	3
AC Milan	1996–97	Serie A	26	1	3	0	6	0	1	0	36	1
AC Milan	1997–98	Serie A	30	0	7	0	–		–		37	0
AC Milan	1998–99	Serie A	31	1	2	0	–		–		33	1
AC Milan	1999–2000	Serie A	27	1	4	0	6	0	1	0	38	1
AC Milan	2000–01	Serie A	31	1	4	0	14	0	–		49	1
AC Milan	2001–02	Serie A	15	0	0	0	4	0	–		19	0
AC Milan	2002–03	Serie A	29	2	1	0	19	0	–		49	2
AC Milan	2003–04	Serie A	30	0	0	0	9	0	3 (Note: One appearance in Supercoppa Italiana, one appearance in UEFA Super Cup, one appearance in Intercontinental Cup)	0	42	0
AC Milan	2004–05	Serie A	33	0	0	0	13	1	1	0	47	1
AC Milan	2005–06	Serie A	14	2	0	0	9	0	–		23	2
AC Milan	2006–07	Serie A	18	1	0	0	9	0	–		27	1
AC Milan	2007–08	Serie A	17	1	0	0	4	0	2 (Note: Appearances in FIFA Club World Cup)	0	23	1
AC Milan	2008–09	Serie A	30	0	0	0	2	0	–		32	0
Career total			647	29	72	1	161	3	22	0	902	33

=== International ===
Appearances and goals by national team and year
National team	Year	Apps	Goals
Italy	1988	10	0
Italy	1989	7	0
Italy	1990	11	0
Italy	1991	8	0
Italy	1992	7	0
Italy	1993	5	2
Italy	1994	12	0
Italy	1995	7	1
Italy	1996	7	0
Italy	1997	11	2
Italy	1998	11	1
Italy	1999	7	1
Italy	2000	11	0
Italy	2001	7	0
Italy	2002	5	0
Total		126	7

Scores and results list Italy's goal tally first, score column indicates score after each Maldini goal.

List of international goals scored by Paolo Maldini
No.	Date	Venue	Opponent	Score	Result	Competition
1	20 January 1993	Florence, Italy	Mexico	2–0	2–0	Friendly
2	24 March 1993	Palermo, Italy	Malta	6–1	6–1	1994 FIFA World Cup qualification
3	11 November 1995	Bari, Italy	Ukraine	3–1	3–1	UEFA Euro 1996 qualifying
4	29 March 1997	Trieste, Italy	Moldova	1–0	3–0	1998 FIFA World Cup qualification
5	30 April 1997	Napoli, Italy	Poland	2–0	3–0	1998 FIFA World Cup qualification
6	22 April 1998	Parma, Italy	Paraguay	1–0	3–1	Friendly
7	5 June 1999	Bologna, Italy	Wales	3–0	4–0	UEFA Euro 2000 qualifying

== Honours ==
AC Milan

- Serie A: 1987–88, 1991–92, 1992–93, 1993–94, 1995–96, 1998–99, 2003–04
- Coppa Italia: 2002–03
- Supercoppa Italiana: 1988, 1992, 1993, 1994, 2004
- European Cup/UEFA Champions League: 1988–89, 1989–90, 1993–94, 2002–03, 2006–07; runner-up: 1992–93, 1994–95, 2004–05
- European/UEFA Super Cup: 1989, 1990, 1994, 2003, 2007
- Intercontinental Cup: 1989, 1990
- FIFA Club World Cup: 2007

Italy U21

- UEFA European Under-21 Championship runner-up: 1986

Italy

- FIFA World Cup runner-up: 1994; third place: 1990
- UEFA European Championship runner-up: 2000
- Scania 100 Tournament: 1991

Individual

- Serie A Team of The Year: 1988, 1991, 1992, 1993
- UEFA European Championship Team of the Tournament: 1988, 1996, 2000
- Bravo Award: 1989
- FIFA World Cup All-Star Team: 1990, 1994
- Ballon d'Or third place: 1994, 2003
- World Soccer Player of the Year: 1994
- El País European Player of the Year: 1994
- ESM Team of the Year: 1994–95, 1995–96, 1999–2000, 2002–03
- FIFA World Player of the Year silver award: 1995
- Onze de Bronze: 1995
- Onze de Onze: 1989, 1991, 1992, 1993, 1994, 1995, 1996, 2003
- Premio Nazionale Carriera Esemplare "Gaetano Scirea": 2002
- FIFA World Cup Dream Team: 2002
- FIFA XI: 2002
- UEFA Champions League final Man of the Match: 2003
- UEFA Team of the Year: 2003, 2005
- UEFA President's Award: 2003
- Serie A Defender of the Year: 2004
- FIFA 100
- UEFA Golden Jubilee Poll: #10
- FIFPro World XI: 2005
- UEFA Club Defender of the Year: 2007
- AFS Top-100 Players of All-Time: 15th(2007)
- Premio internazionale Giacinto Facchetti: 2008
- FIFA Order of Merit: 2008
- UEFA Champions League Achievement Award: 2009
- Marca Leyenda: 2009
- Sports Illustrated Team of the Decade: 2009
- ESPN World Team of the Decade: 2009
- Inducted into the Italian Football Hall of Fame: 2012
- World Soccer Greatest XI of all time: 2013
- World Soccer The Greatest Players of the 20th century: #21
- One Club Man Award: 2016
- UEFA Euro All-time XI
- AC Milan Hall of Fame
- Inducted into the Walk of Fame of Italian sport: 2018
- Gazzetta Sports Awards – Legend: 2018
- Ballon d'Or Dream Team: 2020
- IFFHS All-time Men's Dream Team: 2021
- Golden Foot: 2021, as Football Legend
- Globe Soccer Awards Sporting Director of the Year: 2022
- IFFHS Legends

Records

- Most appearances in all competitions (Milan): 902
- Second-most Serie A appearances (only Serie A regular-seasons): 647
- Most league appearances for Milan (only Serie A regular-seasons): 647
- Most league appearances for the same club (Milan) (only Serie A regular-seasons): 647
- Most seasons played in Serie A: 25 (shared with Francesco Totti)
- Most seasons played in Serie A for the same club (Milan): 25 (shared with Francesco Totti for Roma)
- Third-most UEFA club competitions appearances: 174
- Most UEFA club competitions appearances for Milan: 174
- Most UEFA club competitions appearances for the same club (Milan): 174
- Most European competitions appearances: 168
- Most European competitions appearances for AC Milan: 168
- Most UEFA Champions League appearances for AC Milan: 139
- Most finals played in UEFA Champions League – 8 (shared with Francisco Gento)
- Longest-serving player (Milan): 24 years and 132 days (from 20 January 1985 to 31 May 2009)
- Most FIFA World Cup appearances for Italy: 23
- Record of minutes played in the World Cups: 2216
- Fastest goal scored in UEFA Champions League/European Cup final history: 50 seconds, 2005
- Oldest player to score a goal in UEFA Champions League/European Cup final history: aged 36 years and 333 days, playing for Milan against Liverpool, 2005
- Most European/UEFA Super Cup titles: (shared with Dani Alves) (1989, 1990, 1994, 2003)
- Most European/UEFA Super Cup final appearances: (shared with Dani Alves) (1989, 1990, 1993, 1994, 2003)
- Second-most career club appearances by an Italian player: 902
- Most appearances for a single Italian club: 902 (with Milan)

Orders

4th Class / Officer: Ufficiale Ordine al Merito della Repubblica Italiana: 2000

5th Class / Knight: Cavaliere Ordine al Merito della Repubblica Italiana: 1991

== See also ==
- List of footballers with 100 or more UEFA Champions League appearances
- List of men's footballers with 100 or more international caps
- List of men's footballers with the most official appearances
- List of one-club men in association football
