= List of Serie A players =

This is a list of the top 100 positioned players by number of appearances in Serie A, Italy's top flight football league, during its history starting from the 1929–30 season. This list does not include goals scored during 1944 Campionato Alta Italia and the 1945–46 Serie A-B, held in both rounds.

== List ==
Players whose names are in bold are still active and currently play in Serie A. Italics show players still active but playing professional football outside Serie A.

Note: Appearances in play-off matches are not considered.

As of 25 May 2026.

Rank	Nation	Player	Appearances	Goals	Seasons played	Years active	Club(s)
**1**	(Italy)	Gianluigi Buffon	657	−	24	1995−2006 2007–2018 2019–2021	168 Parma; 489 Juventus
**2**	(Italy)	Paolo Maldini	647	29	25	1984−2009	647 Milan
**3**	(Italy)	Francesco Totti	619	250	25	1992–2017	619 Roma
**4**	(Argentina)	Javier Zanetti	615	12	19	1995−2014	615 Internazionale
**5**	(Italy)	Gianluca Pagliuca	592	−	19	1987−2005 2006−2007	198 Sampdoria; 165 Internazionale; 206 Bologna; 23 Ascoli
**6**	(Italy)	Dino Zoff	570	−	20	1961−1962 1963−1965 1966−1983	4 Udinese; 93 Mantova; 143 Napoli; 330 Juventus
**7**	(Slovenia)	Samir Handanović	566	–	18	2004−2006 2008–2023	182 Udinese; 3 Treviso; 1 Lazio; 380 Internazionale
**8**	(Italy)	Pietro Vierchowod	562	38	20	1980−2000	30 Como; 28 Fiorentina; 30 Roma; 358 Sampdoria; 21 Juventus; 16 Milan; 79 Piacenza
**9**	(Italy)	Fabio Quagliarella	556	182	20	1999−2000 2001–2002 2005–2023	55 Torino; 33 Ascoli; 277 Sampdoria; 73 Udinese; 34 Napoli; 84 Juventus
**10**	(Italy)	Roberto Mancini	541	156	19	1981−2000	30 Bologna; 424 Sampdoria; 87 Lazio
11	(Italy)	Silvio Piola	537	274	21	1929–1943 1946–1947 1948–1954	127 Pro Vercelli; 227 Lazio; 28 Juventus; 155 Novara
12	(Italy)	Enrico Albertosi	532	−	21	1958−1980	185 Fiorentina; 177 Cagliari; 170 Milan
13	(Italy)	Gianni Rivera	527	128	21	1958−1979	26 Alessandria; 501 Milan
14	(Italy)	Giuseppe Bergomi	519	23	19	1980−1999	519 Internazionale
15	(Italy)	Alberto Gilardino	514	188	18	1999–2017	17 Piacenza; 39 Hellas Verona; 96 Parma; 94 Milan; 132 Fiorentina; 50 Genoa; 36 Bologna; 33 Palermo; 14 Empoli; 3 Pescara
16	(Italy)	Andrea Consigli	510	−	15	2008−2010 2011–2024	153 Atalanta; 357 Sassuolo
17	(Italy)	Antonio Candreva	502	85	16	2008; 2009–2024	3 Udinese; 19 Livorno; 16 Juventus; 31 Parma; 18 Cesena; 151 Lazio; 124 Internazionale; 71 Sampdoria; 69 Salernitana
18	(Italy)	Ciro Ferrara	500	27	21	1984−2005	247 Napoli; 253 Juventus
19	(Italy)	Giovanni Galli	496	−	18	1977−1995	259 Fiorentina; 98 Milan; 98 Napoli; 31 Torino; 10 Parma
20	(Italy)	Tarcisio Burgnich	494	6	19	1958−1976	8 Udinese; 13 Juventus; 31 Palermo; 358 Internazionale; 84 Napoli
21	(North Macedonia)	Goran Pandev	493	101	18	2003−2014 2015–2022	20 Ancona; 159 Lazio; 46 Internazionale; 92 Napoli; 176 Genoa
21	(Italy)	Andrea Pirlo	493	58	19	1994–1995 1997−2015	40 Brescia; 22 Internazionale; 28 Reggina; 284 Milan; 119 Juventus
23	(Italy)	Giuseppe Favalli	486	7	20	1989−1990 1991−2010	59 Cremonese; 298 Lazio; 49 Internazionale; 80 Milan
24	(Italy)	Giancarlo De Sisti	478	50	19	1960−1979	222 Roma; 256 Fiorentina
24	(Italy)	Alessandro Del Piero	478	188	18	1993−2006 2007−2012	478 Juventus
24	(Italy)	Angelo Peruzzi	478	−	20	1987−2007	16 Roma; 29 Hellas Verona; 208 Juventus; 33 Internazionale; 192 Lazio
27	(Italy)	Giacinto Facchetti	475	59	18	1960−1978	475 Internazionale
28	(Italy)	Franco Baresi	470	12	18	1977−1997	470 Milan
29	(Italy)	Pietro Ferraris	469	123	18	1929−1950	86 Pro Vercelli; 83 Napoli; 139 Internazionale; 104 Torino; 57 Novara
30	(Italy)	Sergio Cervato	466	45	16	1948−1964	316 Fiorentina; 62 Juventus; 88 SPAL
31	(Italy)	**Lorenzo De Silvestri**	462	28	20	2006–	47 Lazio; 74 Fiorentina; 109 Sampdoria; 112 Torino; **120 Bologna**
32	(Italy)	Franco Causio	460	66	18	1967−1986	305 Juventus; 22 Palermo; 83 Udinese; 24 Internazionale; 26 Lecce
33	(Brazil) (Italy)	José Altafini	459	216	18	1958−1976	205 Milan; 180 Napoli; 74 Juventus
33	(Italy)	Daniele De Rossi	459	43	17	2002–2019	459 Roma
33	(Italy)	Sergio Pellissier	459	112	17	2002−2007 2008–2019	459 Chievo
36	(Italy)	Alessandro Costacurta	458	3	20	1987−2007	458 Milan
37	(Italy)	Roberto Baggio	452	205	19	1985−2004	94 Fiorentina; 141 Juventus; 51 Milan; 30 Bologna; 41 Internazionale; 95 Brescia
38	(Italy)	Dario Dainelli	446	11	18	2000–2018	14 Lecce; 13 Hellas Verona; 60 Brescia; 141 Fiorentina; 57 Genoa; 161 Chievo
38	(France)	Sébastien Frey	446	−	15	1998−2013	35 Internazionale; 30 Hellas Verona; 132 Parma; 175 Fiorentina; 74 Genoa
40	(Italy)	Antonio Di Natale	445	209	14	2002−2016	60 Empoli; 385 Udinese
41	(Italy)	Giampiero Boniperti	443	178	15	1946−1961	443 Juventus
42	(Italy)	Mario Corso	436	78	16	1958−1974	413 Internazionale; 23 Genoa
43	(Italy)	Leonardo Bonucci	431	32	15	2006; 2009–2023	1 Internazionale; 38 Bari; 357 Juventus; 35 Milan
44	(Italy)	Giorgio Chiellini	430	27	17	2004–2006 2007–2022	37 Fiorentina; 393 Juventus
45	(Italy)	Giacomo Mari	426	24	14	1946−1960	113 Atalanta; 133 Juventus; 70 Sampdoria; 110 Padova
46	(Italy)	Francesco Janich	425	−	16	1956−1972	38 Atalanta; 93 Lazio; 294 Bologna
47	(Italy)	Amedeo Amadei	423	174	16	1936−1956	182 Roma; 70 Internazionale; 171 Napoli
47	(Italy)	Francesco Acerbi	423	24	15	2011−2026	24 Chievo; 6 Milan; 157 Sassuolo; 135 Lazio; 101 Internazionale
47	(Poland)	**Piotr Zieliński**	423	50	14	2012–	19 Udinese; 63 Empoli; 281 Napoli; **60 Internazionale**
50	(Italy)	Paolo Cannavaro	422	12	18	1999–2006 2007–2018	92 Parma; 24 Hellas Verona; 197 Napoli; 109 Sassuolo
50	(Italy)	Luca Marchegiani	422	−	16	1988−2005	113 Torino; 243 Lazio; 66 Chievo
52	(Italy)	Fabio Cannavaro	421	14	15	1992−2006 2009−2010	58 Napoli; 212 Parma; 50 Internazionale; 101 Juventus
53	(Italy)	Morgan De Sanctis	419	−	17	1997−2007 2009−2016	3 Juventus; 194 Udinese; 147 Napoli; 75 Roma
54	(Italy)	Sandro Mazzola	417	116	17	1960−1977	417 Internazionale
54	(Italy)	Alessandro Nesta	417	8	19	1993−2012	193 Lazio; 224 Milan
56	(Colombia)	Juan Cuadrado	414	43	17	2009−2026	20 Udinese; 33 Lecce; 85 Fiorentina; 224 Juventus; 10 Internazionale; 23 Atalanta; 19 Pisa
57	(Italy)	Francesco Antonioli	416	−	15	1991−1993 1994−1995 1996−2006 2008−2009 2010−2012	13 Milan; 30 Reggiana; 100 Bologna; 102 Roma; 104 Sampdoria; 67 Cesena
58	(Italy)	Cesare Maldini	412	3	15	1952−1967	32 Triestina; 347 Milan; 33 Torino
59	(Italy)	Massimo Gobbi	411	12	15	2004−2019	71 Cagliari; 81 Fiorentina; 171 Parma; 88 Chievo
60	(Slovakia)	Marek Hamšík	409	100	13	2004−2005 2007–2019	1 Brescia; 408 Napoli
60	(Italy)	Lido Vieri	409	−	17	1958−1976	269 Torino; 140 Internazionale
62	(Italy)	Sergio Santarini	406	6	16	1967−1983	14 Internazionale; 344 Roma; 48 Catanzaro
63	(Italy)	Matteo Brighi	405	25	17	2000−2016 2018–2019	11 Juventus; 55 Bologna; 22 Parma; 29 Brescia; 89 Chievo; 108 Roma; 11 Atalanta; 39 Torino; 31 Sassuolo; 10 Empoli
63	(Italy)	Giorgio Ferrini	405	39	15	1960−1975	405 Torino
63	(Italy)	Diego Fuser	405	65	17	1986−2003	49 Torino; 35 Milan; 32 Fiorentina; 188 Lazio; 86 Parma; 15 Roma
63	(Italy)	Giuseppe Savoldi	405	168	15	1965−1982	57 Atalanta; 230 Bologna; 118 Napoli
67	(Italy)	Mauro Tassotti	404	8	17	1978−1997	41 Lazio; 363 Milan
68	(Italy)	Sandro Salvadore	403	16	16	1958−1974	72 Milan; 331 Juventus
68	(Italy)	Lucidio Sentimenti	403	4	15	1938−1959	53 Modena; 129 Juventus; 170 Lazio; 48 Vicenza; 3 Torino
68	(Italy)	Luciano Castellini	403	−	15	1970−1985	201 Torino; 202 Napoli
68	(Italy)	Romano Fogli	403	13	16	1955−1971	49 Torino; 285 Bologna; 43 Milan; 26 Catania
72	(Italy)	Simone Perrotta	402	43	15	1998−2013	5 Juventus; 56 Bari; 95 Chievo; 246 Roma
73	(Italy)	Gino Armano	401	106	13	1946−1959	57 Alessandria; 255 Internazionale; 89 Torino
73	(Italy)	Carlo Reguzzoni	401	155	15	1929−1948	42 Pro Patria; 359 Bologna
73	(Italy)	Paolo Pulici	401	142	17	1967−1985	335 Torino; 26 Udinese; 40 Fiorentina
76	(Italy)	Antonio Cassano	400	113	16	1999−2006 2007−2017	48 Bari; 118 Roma; 120 Sampdoria; 33 Milan; 28 Internazionale; 53 Parma
76	(Italy)	Teobaldo Depetrini	400	9	18	1930−1951	66 Pro Vercelli; 304 Juventus; 30 Torino
76	(Sweden)	Kurt Hamrin	400	190	15	1956−1971	23 Juventus; 30 Padova; 289 Fiorentina; 36 Milan; 22 Napoli
79	(Italy)	Gaetano Scirea	397	24	15	1972−1988	20 Atalanta; 377 Juventus
79	(Italy)	Guido Vincenzi	397	1	15	1953−1969	109 Internazionale; 288 Sampdoria
81	(Netherlands)	Clarence Seedorf	396	58	14	1995−1996 2000−2012	32 Sampdoria; 64 Internazionale; 300 Milan
82	(Italy)	Fabrizio Ferron	394	−	16	1988−2003	217 Atalanta; 95 Sampdoria; 4 Internazionale; 64 Hellas Verona; 14 Como
82	(Argentina)	Bruno Pesaola	394	62	13	1950−1964	90 Roma; 64 Novara; 240 Napoli
82	(Italy)	Christian Panucci	394	34	16	1991−1997 1999–2000 2001–2010	31 Genoa; 89 Milan; 26 Internazionale; 229 Roma; 19 Parma
85	(Italy)	Mario Bergamaschi	393	6	14	1950–1964	96 Como; 132 Milan; 165 Sampdoria
85	(Italy)	Giuseppe Sabadini	393	17	18	1965−1985	90 Sampdoria; 161 Milan; 111 Catanzaro; 16 Catania; 15 Ascoli
87	(Italy)	Massimo Ambrosini	392	30	19	1995–2014	344 Milan; 27 Vicenza; 21 Fiorentina
87	(Italy)	Alessandro Gamberini	392	8	17	1995–2014	78 Bologna; 194 Fiorentina; 25 Napoli; 10 Genoa; 85 Chievo
87	(Italy)	Giuseppe Baresi	392	10	15	1977–1992	392 Internazionale
90	(Italy)	Carlo Annovazzi	391	65	12	1946–1958	252 Milan; 139 Atalanta
90	(Italy)	Giacomo Bulgarelli	391	43	17	1958–1975	391 Bologna
90	(Italy)	Luigi Di Biagio	391	59	15	1988–2007	1 Lazio; 87 Foggia; 114 Roma; 117 Internazionale; 65 Brescia; 7 Ascoli
93	(Italy)	Simone Vergassola	390	28	14	1996–1999 2001–2013	48 Sampdoria; 61 Torino; 281 Siena
94	(Italy)	Giampiero Pinzi	389	21	17	1999–2016	305 Udinese; 84 Chievo
95	(Italy)	Gaudenzio Bernasconi	388	1	13	1952–1965	54 Atalanta; 334 Sampdoria
95	(Italy)	Giuseppe Furino	388	9	16	1968–1984	27 Palermo; 361 Juventus
97	(Italy)	Giuseppe Bruscolotti	387	9	16	1972–1988	387 Napoli
97	(Italy)	Francesco Morini	387	–	15	1963–1979	131 Sampdoria; 256 Juventus
97	(Italy)	Stefano Tacconi	387	–	15	1980–1995	90 Avellino; 254 Juventus; 43 Genoa
100	(Italy)	Ivano Blason	386	19	15	1946–1962	125 Triestina; 85 Internazionale; 176 Padova
100	(Italy)	Giacomo Losi	386	3	15	1954–1969	386 Roma
100	(Italy)	Alessandro Lucarelli	386	20	13	1998−2000 2001–2002 2004–2008 2009–2015	70 Piacenza; 27 Livorno; 67 Reggina; 29 Genoa; 193 Parma
