= Antonio Benarrivo =

Italian footballer (born 1968)

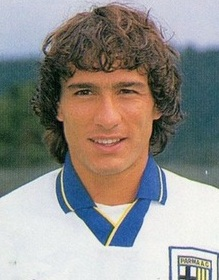
- Benarrivo with Parma in 1993

Personal information
- Date of birth: 21 August 1968 (age 58)
- Place of birth: Brindisi, Italy
- Height: 1.70 m (5 ft 7 in)
- Position: Full-back

Senior career*
Years	Team	Apps	(Gls)
1986–1989	Brindisi	76	(2)
1989–1991	Padova	69	(7)
1991–2004	Parma	258	(5)
Total		327	(14)

International career
1993–1997	Italy	23	(0)
Medal record
Men's Football
Representing Italy
FIFA World Cup
Runner-up	1994 USA
- * Club domestic league appearances and goals

Antonio Benarrivo (Italian pronunciation: [anˈtɔːnjo benarˈriːvo]; born 21 August 1968) is an Italian former professional footballer who played as a defender. One of the best players in the world in his position in the 1990s, Benarrivo was an energetic attacking full-back capable of operating on both wings; he began his career with Brindisi in 1986, and later moved to Padova in 1989. He came to prominence during his time with Parma, joining the club in 1991; he won several domestic and European titles with the team and eventually became the club's record appearance holder in Serie A and in European competitions.

At international level, Benarrivo represented Italy at the 1994 FIFA World Cup, where they reached the final.

== Club career ==
Benarrivo started playing with the professional football team of his city, Brindisi, in Serie C1, during the 1986–87 season. After three seasons playing in Apulia, he went to play for Padova in Serie B, where he remained for two years, attracting much attention from larger Italian clubs.

In 1991, Benarrivo was bought by Parma under Nevio Scala; that year, he would help his new team to qualify for the UEFA Cup in his first year in Serie A. He quickly became one of the strongest players of the Emilian side, which achieved notable domestic and European successes over the next decade. In his first year in the highest division, Bennarivo won the 1992 Italian Cup, and the following year, during the 1992–93 season, he won the 1993 Cup Winners' Cup. He reached a second consecutive Cup Winners' Cup final during the 1993–94 season and was defeated, although he was able to capture the European Supercup with the club in 1993.

The series of thrilling triumphs he endured during his time at Parma, which culminated in the UEFA Cup victory during the 1994–95 season, as well as another Coppa Italia final, were not quite replicated in Serie A, however. Although Parma managed to navigate the top spots of the table during these seasons, they were not able to beat the dominant Milan and Juventus sides to the Serie A title, with their best finish coming during the 1996–97 season, where they finished the league in second place, qualifying for the 1997–98 UEFA Champions League; they also managed a third-place finish during the 1994–95 season, as well as several fourth-place finishes during this time, usually achieving European qualification.

Benarrivo experienced another successful year with the club during the 1998–99 season. Parma finished fourth place in the league, but Benarrivo finished the season with the conquest of his second UEFA Cup and Italian Cup titles, following these successes up with the 1999 Supercoppa Italiana, a title which had evaded him in 1995. This would be his final season as an indisputable starter, however, and the following seasons would see him play with less regularity.

During the 1999–2000 season, Parma finished in fourth place yet again, and narrowly missed out on qualifying for the UEFA Champions League after losing out to Inter in the playoff match. Parma managed their third consecutive fourth-place finish in the league during the 2000–01 season, also reaching another Coppa Italia final, only to be defeated by Fiorentina. Benarrivo managed to add another trophy to his club silverware, however, with a third Italian Cup in 2002. Benarrivo retired from professional football in 2004. With the Emilian club, he collected 257 appearances in Serie A, scoring 5 goals, and is the club's record appearance holder in the top-tier of Italian football. Following his retirement, he worked as a coach.

== International career ==
Benarrivo played with the national team a total of 23 times, and for a period, he was the starting right-back for the Italians. He made his debut on 22 September 1993 under manager Arrigo Sacchi, in a 1994 FIFA World Cup qualifying match against Estonia. He took part in the 1994 FIFA World Cup with Italy, where they reached the final only to lose out to Brazil on penalties. Benarrivo was a key member of the starting line-up for the 1994 World Cup, also featuring in the final defeat, and demonstrating his tactical versatility as he alternated between playing on the right and the left flanks. During the tournament, he notably won a penalty in extra time during the round of 16 match against Nigeria, from which Roberto Baggio subsequently scored, sending the Italians to the quarter-finals. Benarrivo played with the national side until 1997, making his final appearance on 29 October, against Russia.

== Playing style ==
Although he was usually deployed on the right, Benarrivo was comfortable playing on both flanks. An energetic offensive full-back, he was known for his attacking prowess, despite rarely scoring, and was sometimes employed as a wing-back, or as a makeshift wide midfielder, due to his pace, stamina, offensive capabilities, technique, crossing accuracy and ability to cover the flank both offensively and defensively. These attributes led him to be considered one of the best players in his position during the 1990s.

== Honours ==
Parma

- Coppa Italia: 1991–92, 1998–99, 2001–02
- Supercoppa Italiana: 1999
- UEFA Cup Winners' Cup: 1992–93
- UEFA Cup: 1994–95, 1998–99
- UEFA Super Cup: 1993

Italy

- FIFA World Cup runner-up: 1994
