= Alessandro Lucarelli =

Italian footballer (born 1977)

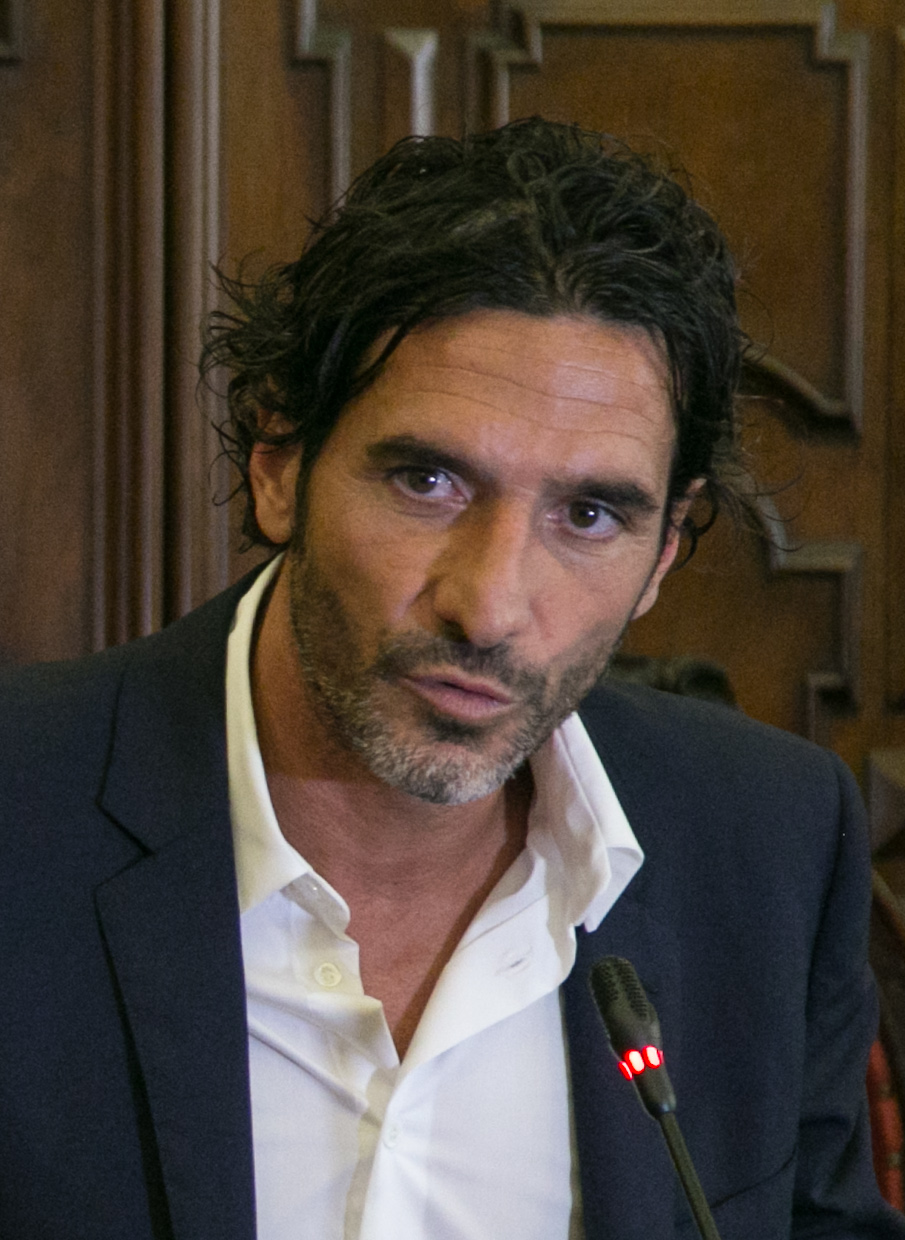
- Alessandro Lucarelli

Personal information
- Date of birth: 22 July 1977 (age 49)
- Place of birth: Livorno, Italy
- Height: 1.82 m (6 ft 0 in)
- Position: Defender

Senior career*
Years	Team	Apps	(Gls)
1996–2002	Piacenza	89	(0)
1997–1998	→ Leffe (loan)	29	(0)
2002–2003	Palermo	28	(0)
2003–2004	Fiorentina	31	(0)
2004–2005	Livorno	27	(4)
2005–2007	Reggina	67	(4)
2007	Siena	0	(0)
2007–2008	Genoa	29	(1)
2008–2018	Parma	333	(21)
Total		633	(30)
- * Club domestic league appearances and goals

Alessandro Lucarelli (Italian pronunciation: [al.esˈsan.dro lu.kaˈre.li] born 22 July 1977) is an Italian football director and former professional footballer who last played for Parma as a defender.

== Playing career ==
Alessandro Lucarelli started his professional career at Piacenza, whose youth sides he also represented. In 1997, he was sent out on loan to Leffe in order to gain first-team experience, making 29 league appearances with the side in 1997–98 Serie C2. Leffe narrowly avoided relegation in a relegation play-out. He became a more prominent member of the first team upon his return to Piacenza, where he spent four seasons as a regular. Playing for the first time in Serie A, Lucarelli avoided relegation with Piacenza in 1998–1999 but went down the following year after finishing bottom of the league. Piacenza and Lucarelli secured an immediate return to the top division the next year with a second-place finish in Serie B. In 2001–02, Piacenza finished 12th, and this proved to be Lucarelli's final season with the club after 100 appearances in all competitions.

After leaving Piacenza in the summer of 2002, Lucarelli moved to Palermo, then in Serie B, where he spent just one season, making 28 league appearances for the Rosanero, who finished just outside of the promotion places. A brief spell at Brescia in the summer of 2003 lasted just two appearances in the 2003 UEFA Intertoto Cup, which would prove to be his only two appearances in European competition. In August of the same year, he moved to another Serie B side, this time Fiorentina, where he made 31 appearances as they were promoted to Serie A.

His hometown club, Livorno, noticed the defender's qualities and signed him for the 2004–05 Serie A season. He made 28 appearances in his only full season at the club and also scored the first league goals of his professional career as he bagged four goals. Livorno finished ninth in Serie A. Lucarelli moved to Reggina for the 2005–06 season and would spend two seasons at the club, twice achieving mid-table finishes before repeating the feat with Genoa in 2007–08, a club he had joined in the summer of 2007, having been exchanged to Siena from Reggina for Francesco Cozza, but immediately leaving for Genoa, where he signed a three-year contract. Genoa paid €1.9 million to Siena to acquire Lucarelli.

The following summer, 2008, he rejoined his brother Cristiano at Parma, who paid €1.2 million for his services. Parma were in Serie B at the time and Lucarelli helped Parma to promotion that season, making 39 appearances in all competitions. This was Lucarelli's third promotion from Serie B to A. Between 2009 and 2015 and across six seasons, Lucarelli made 193 Serie A appearances for the club. In his sixth season at the club, he became club captain. During his time at Parma, he entered the top 100 of players with most Serie A appearances, appearing 386 times for five clubs. Lucarelli was the only player to remain at Parma following the club's demotion to Serie D. He earned three successive promotions in the rebirth of the club from Serie D in 2015–16, Lega Pro to Serie B in 2016–17 and to Serie A in 2017–18. On 4 November 2017, Lucarelli became Parma's record holder for league appearances, moving ahead of Ivo Cocconi on the all-time list. On 27 May 2018, Lucarelli announced his retirement during Parma's promotion party at the Stadio Ennio Tardini, with Parma retiring his number 6 jersey.

== Directorial career ==
Following his retirement in May 2018, Lucarelli remained at Parma, being appointed as the club's Club Manager. In 2020, he was promoted to the role of Deputy Sporting Director. In June 2021, he took on a new executive role as the Loan Manager for the club. On 12 August 2025, Parma officially announced the conclusion of their professional relationship with Lucarelli after seven years as a director.

== Personal life ==
Lucarelli was born in Livorno, the younger brother of Cristiano Lucarelli, who played for Livorno and the Italy national football team. Both the Lucarelli brothers captained their respective clubs for the 2006–07 season. Alessandro's son, Matteo, now plays for Bulgarian Tsarsko Selo, on loan from Parma.

== Career statistics ==
As of 18 May 2018

Club	Season	League			Cup		Other		Total	
Club	Season	Division	Apps	Goals	Apps	Goals	Apps	Goals	Apps	Goals
Leffe	Serie C2	1997–98	29	0	0	0	0	0	29	0
Piacenza	Serie A	1998–99	21	0	1	0	0	0	22	0
Piacenza	Serie A	1999–2000	26	0	2	0	0	0	28	0
Piacenza	Serie B	2000–01	19	0	5	1	0	0	24	1
Piacenza	Serie A	2001–02	23	0	3	0	0	0	26	0
Piacenza	Total		89	0	11	1	0	0	100	1
Palermo	Serie B	2002–03	28	0	2	0	0	0	30	0
Brescia	Serie A	2003–04	0	0	0	0	2	0	2	0
Fiorentina	Serie B	2003–04	31	0	0	0	0	0	31	0
Livorno	Serie A	2004–05	27	4	1	0	0	0	28	4
Livorno	Serie A	2005–06	0	0	1	0	0	0	1	0
Livorno	Total		27	4	2	0	0	0	29	4
Reggina	Serie A	2005–06	33	2	0	0	0	0	33	2
Reggina	Serie A	2006–07	34	2	4	1	0	0	38	3
Reggina	Total		67	4	4	1	0	0	71	5
Genoa	Serie A	2007–08	29	1	0	0	0	0	29	1
Parma	Serie B	2008–09	37	2	2	0	0	0	39	2
Parma	Serie A	2009–10	33	2	1	1	0	0	34	3
Parma	Serie A	2010–11	32	1	2	0	0	0	34	1
Parma	Serie A	2011–12	34	2	1	0	0	0	35	2
Parma	Serie A	2012–13	32	1	0	0	0	0	32	1
Parma	Serie A	2013–14	34	4	0	0	0	0	34	4
Parma	Serie A	2014–15	28	1	1	0	0	0	29	1
Parma	Serie D	2015–16	36	2	0	0	2	0	38	2
Parma	Lega Pro	2016–17	35	1	2	0	5	0	42	1
Parma	Serie B	2017–18	32	4	1	0	0	0	33	4
Parma	Total		333	21	10	1	7	0	350	22
Career total			633	30	29	3	9	0	671	33

== Honours ==
=== Club ===
- Parma
  - Serie D: 2015–16
