= William Bronzoni =

Italian footballer

Personal information
- Date of birth: 27 July 1927
- Place of birth: Bibbiano, Italy
- Date of death: 1 September 1987 (aged 60)
- Position: Forward

Senior career*
Years	Team	Apps	(Gls)
1945–1953	Parma	201	(78)
1953–1954	Sambenedettese	31	(13)
1954–1957	Livorno	79	(28)
1957–1958	Fanfulla	?	(?)
1958–1959	Sambenedettese	9	(2)
1959–1961	Rapallo Ruentes	23	(?)
1960–1962	Spezia	38	(14)
Total		?	(?)
- * Club domestic league appearances and goals

William Bronzoni (27 July 1927 – 1 September 1987) was an Italian football player, who operated as a forward. He was born in Bibbiano, Italy.

== Playing career ==
Bronzoni started career his in 1945 with Parma, where he played in Serie B and Serie C. He played 201 matches and scored 78 league goals, which remains a club record to this day. He also captained the club. He failed to live re-create his early years at Parma at any other club on a consistent basis, although he did win the Serie C title with Livorno in 1955. and eventually retired in 1962, having scored 28 career goals in 106 Serie B matches and 107 in 252 in Serie C.
