= Giovanni Colonnelli =

Italian footballer (1951–2021)

Personal information
- Date of birth: 14 January 1951
- Place of birth: Province of Ancona, Italy
- Date of death: 15 November 2021 (aged 70)
- Place of death: Province of Ancona, Italy
- Position: Midfielder

Senior career*
Years	Team	Apps	(Gls)
1971–1979	Parma		
- Reggiana
- Maceratese
- * Club domestic league appearances and goals

Giovanni Colonnelli (14 January 1951 – 15 November 2021) was an Italian professional footballer who played as a midfielder for Parma, Reggiana and Maceratese.
