= Ivo Cocconi =

Italian footballer (1929–2020)

Personal information
- Date of birth: 28 May 1929
- Place of birth: Parma, Italy
- Date of death: 14 February 2020 (aged 90)
- Place of death: Parma
- Position(s): Defender

Senior career*
Years	Team	Apps	(Gls)
1948–1962	Parma	308	(4)
- *Club domestic league appearances and goals

Ivo Cocconi (28 May 1929 – 14 February 2020) was an Italian football player, who operated as a defender.

Cocconi was born in Parma. He made his debut on 2 April 1950 in a 2–1 defeat against Cesena at the age of twenty. Three years later, as captain, he led the side to promotion to Serie B. His final game for the club was on 13 May 1962 in a 2–0 defeat at Messina. He was never relegated as a player, and he finished his career in Serie B with 200 appearances and two goals.

Cocconi held the record for league appearances at Parma, playing 308 times for the club, until being surpassed by Alessandro Lucarelli in 2017.
