= 1992–93 European Cup Winners' Cup =

Tournament details
- Dates: 19 August 1992 – 12 May 1993
- Teams: 36

Final positions
- Champions: (Italy) Parma (1st title)
- Runners-up: (Belgium) Antwerp

Tournament statistics
- Matches played: 69
- Goals scored: 183 (2.65 per match)
- Attendance: 949,705 (13,764 per match)
- Top scorer(s): Alexandre Czerniatynski (Antwerp); 7 goals

The 1992–93 season of the European Cup Winners' Cup was won by Parma in the final against Antwerp. Both were first time finalists in the competition, and Antwerp were the last Belgian side to reach a European final up to the present day. The competition had more entrants than ever before due to the break-up of Yugoslavia and the Soviet Union, resulting in many new countries eligible to enter the winners of their own cups into the competition. Israel, the Faroe Islands and Liechtenstein were also represented for the first time. Finalists from previous season, Werder Bremen and AS Monaco both competed but were knocked out in the second round.

== Qualifying round ==
| Team 1 | Agg. | Team 2 | 1st leg | 2nd leg |
|---|---|---|---|---|
| Maribor (Slovenia) | 5–2 | (Malta) Ħamrun Spartans | 4–0 | 1–2 |
| Strømsgodset (Norway) | 0–4 | (Israel) Hapoel Petah Tikva | 0–2 | 0–2 |
| Vaduz (Liechtenstein) | 1–12 | (Ukraine) Chornomorets Odesa | 0–5 | 1–7 |
| Avenir Beggen (Luxembourg) | 2–1 | (Faroe Islands) B36 Tórshavn | 1–0 | 1–1 |

=== First leg ===
19 August 1992
15:30

| Maribor (Slovenia) | 4–0 | (Malta) Ħamrun Spartans |
|---|---|---|
| Šimundža 16', 30'; Tarana 49'; Binkovski 77' | Report |

Ljudski vrt, Maribor
Attendance: 4,200
Referee: Bernd Heynemann (Germany)

19 August 1992
16:30

| Vaduz (Liechtenstein) | 0–5 | (Ukraine) Chornomorets Odesa |
|---|---|---|
| | Report | Tsymbalar 45'; Lebed 47'; Sak 52'; Husyev 80', 82' |

Gemeindesportplatz, Vaduz
Attendance: 1,650
Referee: Ernest Kesseler (Luxembourg)

19 August 1992
17:30

| Avenir Beggen (Luxembourg) | 1–0 | (Faroe Islands) B36 Tórshavn |
|---|---|---|
| Krings 1' | Report |

Stade rue Henri Dunant, Luxembourg
Attendance: 684
Referee: Marnix Sandra (Belgium)

19 August 1992
18:00

| Strømsgodset (Norway) | 0–2 | (Israel) Hapoel Petah Tikva |
|---|---|---|
| | Report | Basson 48', 59' |

Marienlyst Stadion, Drammen
Attendance: 1,933
Referee: Wojciech Rudy (Poland)

=== Second leg ===
2 September 1992
14:00

| Chornomorets Odesa (Ukraine) | 7–1 | (Liechtenstein) Vaduz |
|---|---|---|
| Y. Nikiforov 9', 49' (pen.), 78', 90'; Yablonskyi 23'; Tsymbalar 27'; Lebed 77' | Report | Stöber 87' |

Central Stadium Chornomorets, Odesa
Attendance: 4,600
Referee: Jozef Marko (Czechoslovakia)

Chornomorets Odesa won 12–1 on aggregate.

2 September 1992
14:30

| Ħamrun Spartans (Malta) | 2–1 | (Slovenia) Maribor |
|---|---|---|
| J. Brincat 34', 59' | Report | Tarana 38' |

Centenary Stadium, Ta' Qali
Attendance: 850
Referee: Arcangelo Pezzella (Italy)

Maribor won 5–2 on aggregate.

2 September 1992
16:30

| B36 Tórshavn (Faroe Islands) | 1–1 | (Luxembourg) Avenir Beggen |
|---|---|---|
| Reynheim 9' | Report | Krahen 28' |

Gundadalur, Tórshavn
Attendance: 665
Referee: Joe Timmons (Scotland)

Avenir Beggen won 2–1 on aggregate.

2 September 1992
17:00

| Hapoel Petah Tikva (Israel) | 2–0 | (Norway) Strømsgodset |
|---|---|---|
| Levine 17'; Basson 68' | Report |

HaUrva Stadium, Petah Tikva
Attendance: 1,200
Referee: Loizos Loizou (Cyprus)

Hapoel Petah Tikva won 4–0 on aggregate.

== First round ==
| Team 1 | Agg. | Team 2 | 1st leg | 2nd leg |
|---|---|---|---|---|
| Miedź Legnica (Poland) | 0–1 | (France) Monaco | 0–1 | 0–0 |
| Olympiacos (Greece) | 3–1 | (Ukraine) Chornomorets Odesa | 0–1 | 3–0 |
| Trabzonspor (Turkey) | 4–2 | (Finland) TPS | 2–0 | 2–2 |
| Maribor (Slovenia) | 1–9 | (Spain) Atlético Madrid | 0–3 | 1–6 |
| Werder Bremen (Germany) | 4–3 | (Germany) Hannover 96 | 3–1 | 1–2 |
| Airdrieonians (Scotland) | 1–3 | (Czechoslovakia) Sparta Prague | 0–1 | 1–2 |
| Parma (Italy) | 2–1 | (Hungary) Újpest | 1–0 | 1–1 |
| Valur (Iceland) | 0–3 | (Portugal) Boavista | 0–0 | 0–3 |
| Levski Sofia (Bulgaria) | 2–2 (a) | (Switzerland) Luzern | 2–1 | 0–1 |
| Feyenoord (Netherlands) | 2–2 (a) | (Israel) Hapoel Petah Tikva | 1–0 | 1–2 |
| Spartak Moscow (Russia) | 5–1 | (Luxembourg) Avenir Beggen | 0–0 | 5–1 |
| Liverpool (England) | 8–2 | (Cyprus) Apollon Limassol | 6–1 | 2–1 |
| Cardiff City (Wales) | 1–3 | (Austria) Admira Wacker | 1–1 | 0–2 |
| Glenavon (Northern Ireland) | 2–2 (1–3 p) | (Belgium) Antwerp | 1–1 | 1–1 (a.e.t.) |
| AIK (Sweden) | 4–4 (a) | (Denmark) AGF | 3–3 | 1–1 |
| Bohemians (Republic of Ireland) | 0–4 | (Romania) Steaua București | 0–0 | 0–4 |

=== First leg ===
15 September 1992
19:00

| AIK (Sweden) | 3–3 | (Denmark) AGF |
|---|---|---|
| Simpson 51'; Hallström 56'; Yevtushenko 85' | Report | Tøfting 15'; Christensen 36', 54' |

Råsunda Stadium, Solna
Attendance: 3,976
Referee: Stephen Lodge (England)

15 September 1992
19:30

| Airdrieonians (Scotland) | 0–1 | (Czechoslovakia) Sparta Prague |
|---|---|---|
| | Report | Sopko 89' |

Broomfield Park, Airdrie
Attendance: 5,377
Referee: Rune Pedersen (Norway)

15 September 1992
19:30

| Glenavon (Northern Ireland) | 1–1 | (Belgium) Antwerp |
|---|---|---|
| Smith 45' | Report | Lehnhoff 46' |

Mourneview Park, Lurgan
Attendance: 2,556
Referee: Nemus Djurhuus (Faroe Islands)

15 September 1992
20:15

| Werder Bremen (Germany) | 3–1 | (Germany) Hannover 96 |
|---|---|---|
| Rufer 19', 28'; Bratseth 45' | Report | Wójcicki 26' (pen.) |

Weserstadion, Bremen
Attendance: 17,003
Referee: David Elleray (England)

16 September 1992
15:00

| Miedź Legnica (Poland) | 0–1 | (France) Monaco |
|---|---|---|
| | Report | Djorkaeff 3' |

Stadion Miejski, Legnica
Attendance: 4,800
Referee: Hans-Peter Dellwing (Germany)

16 September 1992
15:00

| Trabzonspor (Turkey) | 2–0 | (Finland) TPS |
|---|---|---|
| Mandıralı 51', 65' | Report |

Hüseyin Avni Aker Stadium, Trabzon
Attendance: 22,000
Referee: Kaj Østergaard (Denmark)

16 September 1992
16:30

| Maribor (Slovenia) | 0–3 | (Spain) Atlético Madrid |
|---|---|---|
| | Report | Alfredo 26'; Luis García 42', 56' |

Ljudski vrt, Maribor
Attendance: 5,000
Referee: Hasan Ceylan (Turkey)

16 September 1992
17:00

| Levski Sofia (Bulgaria) | 2–1 | (Switzerland) Luzern |
|---|---|---|
| Borimirov 53'; Getov 70' (pen.) | Report | Camenzind 9' |

Stadion Georgi Asparuhov, Sofia
Attendance: 15,000
Referee: Václav Krondl (Czechoslovakia)

16 September 1992
18:00

| Spartak Moscow (Russia) | 0–0 | (Luxembourg) Avenir Beggen |
|---|---|---|
| | Report |

Luzhniki Stadium, Moscow
Attendance: 5,000
Referee: Lyuben Angelov (Bulgaria)

16 September 1992
19:30

| Cardiff City (Wales) | 1–1 | (Austria) Admira Wacker |
|---|---|---|
| Pike 59' | Report | Abfalterer 44' |

Ninian Park, Cardiff
Attendance: 9,624
Referee: Jorge Coroado (Portugal)

16 September 1992
19:30

| Bohemians (Republic of Ireland) | 0–0 | (Romania) Steaua București |
|---|---|---|
| | Report |

Dalymount Park, Dublin
Attendance: 4,513
Referee: Gilles Veissière (France)

16 September 1992
19:35

| Liverpool (England) | 6–1 | (Cyprus) Apollon Limassol |
|---|---|---|
| Stewart 4', 38'; Rush 39', 50', 55', 74' | Report | Špoljarić 84' (pen.) |

Anfield, Liverpool
Attendance: 12,769
Referee: José Veiga Trigo (Portugal)

16 September 1992
20:00

| Feyenoord (Netherlands) | 1–0 | (Israel) Hapoel Petah Tikva |
|---|---|---|
| Kiprich 89' | Report |

De Kuip, Rotterdam
Attendance: 19,359
Referee: Ernest Kesseler (Luxembourg)

16 September 1992
20:30

| Parma (Italy) | 1–0 | (Hungary) Újpest |
|---|---|---|
| Asprilla 48' | Report |

Stadio Ennio Tardini, Parma
Attendance: 11,603
Referee: Michał Listkiewicz (Poland)

17 September 1992
17:45

| Valur (Iceland) | 0–0 | (Portugal) Boavista |
|---|---|---|
| | Report |

Laugardalsvöllur, Reykjavík
Attendance: 715
Referee: Jef van Vliet (Netherlands)

17 September 1992
20:30

| Olympiacos (Greece) | 0–1 | (Ukraine) Chornomorets Odesa |
|---|---|---|
| | Report | Sak 4' |

Karaiskakis Stadium, Piraeus
Attendance: 30,000
Referee: Brian Hill (England)

=== Second leg ===
29 September 1992
18:30

| Steaua București (Romania) | 4–0 | (Republic of Ireland) Bohemians |
|---|---|---|
| Andrași 25', 34'; Vlădoiu 45'; Ion 85' | Report |

Stadionul Steaua, Bucharest
Attendance: 3,348
Referee: Friedrich Kaupe (Austria)

Steaua București won 4–0 on aggregate.

29 September 1992
19:00

| Apollon Limassol (Cyprus) | 1–2 | (England) Liverpool |
|---|---|---|
| Špoljarić 60' | Report | Rush 62'; Hutchison 68' |

Tsirio Stadium, Limassol
Attendance: 9,500
Referee: Loris Stafoggia (Italy)

Liverpool won 8–2 on aggregate.

29 September 1992
19:00

| AGF (Denmark) | 1–1 | (Sweden) AIK |
|---|---|---|
| Harder 67' | Report | Simpson 20' |

Århus Idrætspark, Århus
Attendance: 9,000
Referee: Arturo Martino (Switzerland)

4–4 on aggregate. AGF won on away goals.

29 September 1992
19:30

| Admira Wacker (Austria) | 2–0 | (Wales) Cardiff City |
|---|---|---|
| Marschall 47'; Abfalterer 90' | Report |

Bundesstadion Südstadt, Maria Enzersdorf
Attendance: 4,700
Referee: Luben Spasov (Bulgaria)

Admira Wacker won 3–1 on aggregate.

30 September 1992
17:00

| Hapoel Petah Tikva (Israel) | 2–1 | (Netherlands) Feyenoord |
|---|---|---|
| Levine 3'; Kakoun 49' | Report | Fräser 69' |

The National Stadium, Ramat Gan
Attendance: 7,500
Referee: Sándor Piller (Hungary)

2–2 on aggregate. Feyenoord won on away goals.

30 September 1992
18:00

| Sparta Prague (Czechoslovakia) | 2–1 | (Scotland) Airdrieonians |
|---|---|---|
| Vrabec 31'; Vonášek 37' | Report | Black 56' |

Stadion Letná, Prague
Attendance: 8,989
Referee: Atanas Uzunov (Bulgaria)

Sparta Prague won 3–1 on aggregate.

30 September 1992
19:00

| Chornomorets Odesa (Ukraine) | 0–3 | (Greece) Olympiacos |
|---|---|---|
| | Report | Vaitsis 15'; Lytovchenko 27'; Protasov 80' |

Central Stadium Chornomorets, Odesa
Attendance: 26,500
Referee: Gianni Beschin (Italy)

Olympiacos won 3–1 on aggregate.

30 September 1992
19:00

| TPS (Finland) | 2–2 | (Turkey) Trabzonspor |
|---|---|---|
| Kajdy 1'; Lehtonen 84' | Report | Aslan 14'; Orhan 60' |

Kupittaan jalkapallostadion, Turku
Attendance: 1,376
Referee: Hugh Williamson (Scotland)

Trabzonspor won 4–2 on aggregate.

30 September 1992
20:00

| Monaco (France) | 0–0 | (Poland) Miedź Legnica |
|---|---|---|
| | Report |

Stade Louis II, Monaco
Attendance: 4,538
Referee: Manuel Díaz Vega (Spain)

Monaco won 1–0 on aggregate.

30 September 1992
20:00

| Luzern (Switzerland) | 1–0 | (Bulgaria) Levski Sofia |
|---|---|---|
| Camenzind 24' | Report |

Stadion Allmend, Lucerne
Attendance: 12,000
Referee: Joaquín Urío Velázquez (Spain)

2–2 on aggregate. Luzern won on away goals.

30 September 1992
20:00

| Avenir Beggen (Luxembourg) | 1–5 | (Russia) Spartak Moscow |
|---|---|---|
| Novak 87' | Report | Onopko 6'; Pyatnitsky 9', 79'; Radchenko 55'; Popov 59' |

Stade rue Henri Dunant, Luxembourg
Attendance: 1,604
Referee: Sten Johanzon (Sweden)

Spartak Moscow won 5–1 on aggregate.

30 September 1992
20:15

| Hannover 96 (Germany) | 2–1 | (Germany) Werder Bremen |
|---|---|---|
| Daschner 29', 33' | Report | Rufer 18' (pen.) |

Niedersachsenstadion, Hanover
Attendance: 27,436
Referee: Mario van der Ende (Netherlands)

Werder Bremen won 4–3 on aggregate.

30 September 1992
20:15

| Antwerp (Belgium) | 1–1 (a.e.t.) | (Northern Ireland) Glenavon |
|---|---|---|
| Kiekens 65' (pen.) | Report | Ferris 80' |
Penalties
| Lehnhoff (penalty missed); Emmerechts (penalty scored); Vincent (penalty scored); Smidts (penalty scored) | 3–1 | (penalty scored) McMullan; (penalty missed) Crawford; (penalty missed) Ferguson; (penalty missed) Smith |

Bosuilstadion, Antwerp
Attendance: 4,100
Referee: Heinz Holzmann (Austria)

2–2 on aggregate. Antwerp won 3–1 on penalties.

30 September 1992
21:30

| Atlético Madrid (Spain) | 6–1 | (Slovenia) Maribor |
|---|---|---|
| Alfaro 17'; Juanito 45'; Sabas 48' (pen.); Pizo Gómez 69'; Aguilera 80'; Tarana 85' (o.g.) | Report | Bičakčić 22' |

Estadio Vicente Calderón, Madrid
Attendance: 6,500
Referee: Gerhard Kapl (Austria)

Atlético Madrid won 9–1 on aggregate.

1 October 1992
18:00

| Újpest (Hungary) | 1–1 | (Italy) Parma |
|---|---|---|
| Hetesi 62' | Report | Grün 53' |

Megyeri úti Stadion, Budapest
Attendance: 8,000
Referee: Frans Van Den Wijngaert (Belgium)

Parma won 2–1 on aggregate.

1 October 1992
19:15

| Boavista (Portugal) | 3–0 | (Iceland) Valur |
|---|---|---|
| Brandão 14', 81'; Ricky 26' | Report |

Estádio Municipal Dr. Alves Vieira, Torres Novas
Attendance: 1,865
Referee: Eric Blareau (Belgium)

Boavista won 3–0 on aggregate.

== Second round ==
| Team 1 | Agg. | Team 2 | 1st leg | 2nd leg |
|---|---|---|---|---|
| Monaco (France) | 0–1 | (Greece) Olympiacos | 0–1 | 0–0 |
| Trabzonspor (Turkey) | 0–2 | (Spain) Atlético Madrid | 0–2 | 0–0 |
| Werder Bremen (Germany) | 2–4 | (Czechoslovakia) Sparta Prague | 2–3 | 0–1 |
| Parma (Italy) | 2–0 | (Portugal) Boavista | 0–0 | 2–0 |
| Luzern (Switzerland) | 2–4 | (Netherlands) Feyenoord | 1–0 | 1–4 |
| Spartak Moscow (Russia) | 6–2 | (England) Liverpool | 4–2 | 2–0 |
| Admira Wacker (Austria) | 6–7 | (Belgium) Antwerp | 2–4 | 4–3 (a.e.t.) |
| AGF (Denmark) | 4–4 (a) | (Romania) Steaua București | 3–2 | 1–2 |

=== First leg ===
21 October 1992
13:30

| Trabzonspor (Turkey) | 0–2 | (Spain) Atlético Madrid |
|---|---|---|
| | Report | Futre 38'; Moya 59' |

Hüseyin Avni Aker Stadium, Trabzon
Attendance: 10,000
Referee: Aleksey Spirin (Russia)

21 October 1992
17:30

| Parma (Italy) | 0–0 | (Portugal) Boavista |
|---|---|---|
| | Report |

Stadio Ennio Tardini, Parma
Attendance: 8,675
Referee: Jan Damgaard (Denmark)

21 October 1992
17:45

| Luzern (Switzerland) | 1–0 | (Netherlands) Feyenoord |
|---|---|---|
| Rueda 75' | Report |

Stadion Allmend, Lucerne
Attendance: 11,700
Referee: Loizos Loizou (Cyprus)

21 October 1992
18:15

| Werder Bremen (Germany) | 2–3 | (Czechoslovakia) Sparta Prague |
|---|---|---|
| Neubarth 56'; Rufer 79' | Report | Sopko 25'; Dvirnyk 35'; Vonášek 90' |

Weserstadion, Bremen
Attendance: 10,747
Referee: Angelo Amendolia (Italy)

21 October 1992
19:00

| Monaco (France) | 0–1 | (Greece) Olympiacos |
|---|---|---|
| | Report | Vaitsis 86' |

Stade Louis II, Monaco
Attendance: 5,612
Referee: Michał Listkiewicz (Poland)

21 October 1992
19:00

| AGF (Denmark) | 3–2 | (Romania) Steaua București |
|---|---|---|
| Andersen 10'; Christensen 19'; M. Nielsen 76' (pen.) | Report | Vlădoiu 63'; Dumitrescu 85' |

Århus Idraetspark, Århus
Attendance: 17,500
Referee: Aron Schmidhuber (Germany)

21 October 1992
19:05

| Admira Wacker (Austria) | 2–4 | (Belgium) Antwerp |
|---|---|---|
| Marschall 24'; Bacher 41' | Report | Czerniatynski 33', 63', 74'; Segers 55' |

Bundesstadion Südstadt, Maria Enzersdorf
Attendance: 2,300
Referee: Sergei Khusainov (Russia)

22 October 1992
19:00

| Spartak Moscow (Russia) | 4–2 | (England) Liverpool |
|---|---|---|
| Pisarev 10'; Karpin 69', 84' (pen.); Lediakhov 89' | Report | Wright 66'; McManaman 74' |

Luzhniki Stadium, Moscow
Attendance: 51,000
Referee: Rune Larsson (Sweden)

=== Second leg ===
4 November 1992
17:30

| Sparta Prague (Czechoslovakia) | 1–0 | (Germany) Werder Bremen |
|---|---|---|
| Siegl 7' | Report |

Stadion Letná, Prague
Attendance: 29,704
Referee: Egil Nervik (Norway)

Sparta Prague won 4–2 on aggregate.

4 November 1992
18:00

| Steaua București (Romania) | 2–1 | (Denmark) AGF |
|---|---|---|
| Cristescu 83'; Vlădoiu 90' | Report | Christensen 11' |

Stadionul Steaua, Bucharest
Attendance: 13,837
Referee: Ahmet Çakar (Turkey)

4–4 on aggregate. Steaua București won on away goals.

4 November 1992
19:00

| Olympiacos (Greece) | 0–0 | (France) Monaco |
|---|---|---|
| | Report |

Karaiskakis Stadium, Piraeus
Attendance: 30,500
Referee: Alphonse Constantin (Belgium)

Olympiacos won 1–0 on aggregate.

4 November 1992
19:00

| Boavista (Portugal) | 0–2 | (Italy) Parma |
|---|---|---|
| | Report | Nogueira 12' (o.g.); Melli 78' |

Estádio Municipal Dr. Alves Vieira, Torres Novas
Attendance: 2,980
Referee: Hans-Jürgen Weber (Germany)

Parma won 2–0 on aggregate.

4 November 1992
19:15

| Atlético Madrid (Spain) | 0–0 | (Turkey) Trabzonspor |
|---|---|---|
| | Report |

Estadio Vicente Calderón, Madrid
Attendance: 8,672
Referee: Rémi Harrel (France)

Atlético Madrid won 2–0 on aggregate.

4 November 1992
19:35

| Liverpool (England) | 0–2 | (Russia) Spartak Moscow |
|---|---|---|
| | Report | Radchenko 63'; Pyatnitsky 89' |

Anfield, Liverpool
Attendance: 37,993
Referee: Manuel Díaz Vega (Spain)

Spartak Moscow won 6–2 on aggregate.

4 November 1992
20:00

| Feyenoord (Netherlands) | 4–1 | (Switzerland) Luzern |
|---|---|---|
| Taument 2'; Blinker 16'; Kiprich 55', 83' (pen.) | Report | Nadig 12' |

De Kuip, Rotterdam
Attendance: 27,231
Referee: Alan Snoddy (Northern Ireland)

Feyenoord won 4–2 on aggregate.

4 November 1992
20:00

| Antwerp (Belgium) | 3–4 (a.e.t.) | (Austria) Admira Wacker |
|---|---|---|
| Czerniatynski 21', 97'; Severeyns 43' | Report | Bacher 46'; Abfalterer 57'; Ljung 63', 77' |

Bosuilstadion, Antwerp
Attendance: 4,656
Referee: Zbigniew Przesmycki (Poland)

Antwerp won 7–6 on aggregate.

== Quarter-finals ==
| Team 1 | Agg. | Team 2 | 1st leg | 2nd leg |
|---|---|---|---|---|
| Olympiacos (Greece) | 2–4 | (Spain) Atlético Madrid | 1–1 | 1–3 |
| Sparta Prague (Czech Republic) | 0–2 | (Italy) Parma | 0–0 | 0–2 |
| Feyenoord (Netherlands) | 1–4 | (Russia) Spartak Moscow | 0–1 | 1–3 |
| Antwerp (Belgium) | 1–1 (a) | (Romania) Steaua București | 0–0 | 1–1 |

=== First leg ===
2 March 1993
20:00

| Feyenoord (Netherlands) | 0–1 | (Russia) Spartak Moscow |
|---|---|---|
| | Report | Pyatnitsky 36' |

De Kuip, Rotterdam
Attendance: 33,187
Referee: Karl-Josef Assenmacher (Germany)

3 March 1993
18:00

| Sparta Prague (Czech Republic) | 0–0 | (Italy) Parma |
|---|---|---|
| | Report |

Stadion Letná, Prague
Attendance: 24,900
Referee: Alfred Wieser (Austria)

4 March 1993
20:00

| Antwerp (Belgium) | 0–0 | (Romania) Steaua București |
|---|---|---|
| | Report |

Bosuilstadion, Antwerp
Attendance: 9,200
Referee: Vadim Zhuk (Belarus)

4 March 1993
21:00

| Olympiacos (Greece) | 1–1 | (Spain) Atlético Madrid |
|---|---|---|
| Vaitsis 63' | Report | Moya 10' |

O.A.K.A., Athens
Attendance: 52,000
Referee: Rune Larsson (Sweden)

=== Second leg ===
17 March 1993
14:30

| Parma (Italy) | 2–0 | (Czech Republic) Sparta Prague |
|---|---|---|
| Melli 10'; Asprilla 33' | Report |

Stadio Ennio Tardini, Parma
Attendance: 17,942
Referee: John Blankenstein (Netherlands)

Parma won 2–0 on aggregate.

17 March 1993
18:30

| Steaua București (Romania) | 1–1 | (Belgium) Antwerp |
|---|---|---|
| Dumitrescu 19' | Report | Czerniatynski 81' |

Stadionul Steaua, Bucharest
Attendance: 22,000
Referee: Leslie Mottram (Scotland)

1–1 on aggregate. Antwerp won on away goals.

18 March 1993
19:30

| Spartak Moscow (Russia) | 3–1 | (Netherlands) Feyenoord |
|---|---|---|
| Karpin 8', 81'; Radchenko 90' | Report | Kiprich 14' |

Torpedo Stadium, Moscow
Attendance: 15,250
Referee: Joël Quiniou (France)

Spartak Moscow won 4–1 on aggregate.

18 March 1993
21:30

| Atlético Madrid (Spain) | 3–1 | (Greece) Olympiacos |
|---|---|---|
| Manolo 10', 58'; Alfaro 67' | Report | Tsalouchidis 59' |

Estadio Vicente Calderón, Madrid
Attendance: 29,900
Referee: Jim McCluskey (Scotland)

Atlético Madrid won 4–2 on aggregate.

== Semi-finals ==
| Team 1 | Agg. | Team 2 | 1st leg | 2nd leg |
|---|---|---|---|---|
| Atlético Madrid (Spain) | 2–2 (a) | (Italy) Parma | 1–2 | 1–0 |
| Spartak Moscow (Russia) | 2–3 | (Belgium) Antwerp | 1–0 | 1–3 |

=== First leg ===
6 April 1993
21:00

| Atlético Madrid (Spain) | 1–2 | (Italy) Parma |
|---|---|---|
| Luis García 45' | Report | Asprilla 57', 62' |

Estadio Vicente Calderón, Madrid
Attendance: 46,500
Referee: Philip Don (England)

7 April 1993
19:30

| Spartak Moscow (Russia) | 1–0 | (Belgium) Antwerp |
|---|---|---|
| Pyatnitsky 36' | Report |

Luzhniki Stadium, Moscow
Attendance: 57,000
Referee: Leif Sundell (Sweden)

=== Second leg ===
22 April 1993
20:00

| Antwerp (Belgium) | 3–1 | (Russia) Spartak Moscow |
|---|---|---|
| Czerniatynski 36'; Jakovljević 67'; Lehnhoff 76' (pen.) | Report | Radchenko 9' |

Bosuilstadion, Antwerp
Attendance: 11,128
Referee: Jorge Coroado (Portugal)

Antwerp won 3–2 on aggregate.

22 April 1993
21:00

| Parma (Italy) | 0–1 | (Spain) Atlético Madrid |
|---|---|---|
| | Report | Sabas 77' |

Stadio Ennio Tardini, Parma
Attendance: 21,915
Referee: Aron Schmidhuber (Germany)

2–2 on aggregate. Parma won on away goals.

== Final ==
12 May 1993
19:15

| Parma (Italy) | 3–1 | (Belgium) Antwerp |
|---|---|---|
| Minotti 9'; Melli 30'; Cuoghi 84' | Report | Severeyns 11' |

Wembley Stadium, London
Attendance: 37,393
Referee: Karl-Josef Assenmacher (Germany)

== Top scorers ==
| Rank | Player | Team | Goals |
|---|---|---|---|
| 1 | (Belgium) Alex Czerniatynski | (Belgium) Antwerp | 7 |
| 2 | (Russia) Andrey Pyatnitsky | (Russia) Spartak Moscow | 6 |
| 3 | (Wales) Ian Rush | (England) Liverpool | 5 |
| 4 | (Colombia) Faustino Asprilla | (Italy) Parma | 4 |
| 4 | (Denmark) Torben Christensen | (Denmark) AGF | 4 |
| 4 | (Russia) Valery Karpin | (Russia) Spartak Moscow | 4 |
| 4 | (Hungary) József Kiprich | (Netherlands) Feyenoord | 4 |
| 4 | (Ukraine) Yuriy Nikiforov | (Ukraine) Chornomorets Odesa | 4 |
| 4 | (Russia) Dmitri Radchenko | (Russia) Spartak Moscow | 4 |
| 4 | (New Zealand) Wynton Rufer | (Germany) Werder Bremen | 4 |

== See also ==
- 1992–93 UEFA Champions League
- 1992–93 UEFA Cup
