= 1993–94 UEFA Cup =

23rd season of Europe's tertiary club football tournament organised by UEFA

- Dates: 14 September 1993 – 11 May 1994

Final positions
- Champions: (Italy) Inter Milan (2nd title)
- Runners-up: Austria Salzburg

Tournament statistics
- Matches played: 126
- Goals scored: 307 (2.44 per match)
- Attendance: 2,161,952 (17,158 per match)
- Top scorer(s): Dennis Bergkamp (Inter Milan); Edgar Schmitt (Karlsruhe); 8 goals each

The 1993–94 UEFA Cup was the 23rd season of Europe's then-tertiary club football tournament organised by UEFA. The final was played over two legs at the Ernst-Happel Stadion, Vienna, Austria, and at San Siro, Milan, Italy. The competition was won by Italian club Inter Milan, who beat Austria Salzburg of Austria by an aggregate result of 2–0, to claim their second UEFA Cup title in a span of four years.

This would be the final edition of the UEFA Cup with the classic 64-team format that had been in use since 1968, inherited from the Inter-Cities Fairs Cup, before the competition was expanded to accommodate both the new European countries and changes in the UEFA Champions League format. This was the only UEFA Cup or UEFA Europa League edition where an Austrian side reached the final, the third overall for an Austrian team in European competition and the first since Rapid Wien in the 1985 European Cup Winners' Cup.

Inter Milan's title was previously the lowest finish for a European Cup winning team in their league season as Inter finished 13th in the 1993–94 Serie A. This stood until 21 May 2025, when Tottenham Hotspur won the 2024–25 UEFA Europa League while finishing 17th in the 2024–25 Premier League.

== Association team allocation ==
A total of 64 teams from 30 UEFA member associations participated in the 1993–94 UEFA Cup, all entering from the first round over six knock-out rounds. The association ranking based on the UEFA country coefficients was originally used to determine the number of participating teams for each association:

- Associations 1–3 each have four teams qualify.
- Associations 4–8 each have three teams qualify.
- Associations 9–20 each have two teams qualify.
- Associations 21–32 each have one team qualify.

Additionally, associations 9–12 gained a third berth due to Yugoslavia being banned under United Nations embargo and Albania withdrawing from the competition.

Ukraine now had its own allocation as an unranked association alongside Slovenia, after both of them were represented in the previous UEFA Cup. Both associations took over the places of East Germany, which had ceased to exist as a country in 1991 after the German reunification, and its results had been erased from the UEFA ranking. To rebalance the allocations, the association placed on the 21st spot was not originally slated to have a second berth like it had previously. However, Poland had its UEFA Cup allocation removed due to its football scandal, and its two places were reassigned to associations 21–22 as a second berth.

=== Association ranking ===
For the 1993–94 UEFA Cup, the associations are allocated places according to their 1992 UEFA country coefficients, which takes into account their performance in European competitions from 1987–88 to 1991–92. Therefore, it did not include any of the new football federations that had joined UEFA in the previous years, including competing associations Ukraine and Slovenia. Having returned to European competitions in 1990 after a five-year ban, England's score was limited to the last two of the five seasons accounted for in the ranking.

Association ranking for 1993–94 UEFA Cup

| Rank | Association | Coeff. | Teams | Notes |
|---|---|---|---|---|
| 1 | Italy | 52.837 | 4 | |
| 2 | Germany | 42.927 | 4 | |
| 3 | Spain | 40.266 | 4 | |
| 4 | Belgium | 37.633 | 3 | |
| 5 | France | 37.250 | 3 | |
| 6 | Netherlands | 27.500 | 3 | |
| 7 | Portugal | 27.033 | 3 | |
| 8 | FR Yugoslavia | 25.516 | 0 | |
| 9 | Soviet Union: Russia | 24.966 | 3 | |
| 10 | Romania | 24.550 | 3 | |
| 11 | Czechoslovakia: Czech Republic; Slovakia | 20.000 | 3 | |
| 12 | Scotland | 19.750 | 3 | |
| 13 | England | 19.250 | 2 | |
| 14 | Austria | 18.000 | 2 | |
| 15 | Denmark | 16.665 | 2 | |
| 16 | Greece | 16.500 | 2 | |
| - | East Germany | 16.000 | 0 | |

| Rank | Association | Coeff. | Teams | Notes |
|---|---|---|---|---|
| 17 | Turkey | 14.998 | 2 | |
| 18 | Switzerland | 14.750 | 2 | |
| 19 | Poland | 12.166 | 0 | |
| 20 | Sweden | 12.100 | 2 | |
| 21 | Hungary | 11.500 | 2 | |
| 22 | Bulgaria | 10.416 | 2 | |
| 23 | Finland | 9.999 | 1 | |
| - | Wales | 9.000 | 0 | |
| 24 | Albania | 7.666 | 0 | |
| 25 | Iceland | 5.000 | 1 | |
| 26 | Norway | 4.999 | 1 | |
| 27 | Cyprus | 4.000 | 1 | |
| 28 | Northern Ireland | 3.332 | 1 | |
| 29 | Republic of Ireland | 2.665 | 1 | |
| 30 | Malta | 1.999 | 1 | |
| 31 | Luxembourg | 1.665 | 1 | |
| - | Slovenia | 0.000 | 1 | |
| - | Ukraine | 0.000 | 1 | |

Unranked countries entered in other European competitions
| Association | EC | CWC |
|---|---|---|
| Belarus | Yes | Yes |
| Croatia | Yes | Yes |
| Estonia | Yes | Yes |
| Faroe Islands | Yes | Yes |
| Georgia | Yes | No |
| Israel | Yes | Yes |
| Latvia | Yes | Yes |
| Liechtenstein | No | Yes |
| Lithuania | Yes | Yes |
| Moldova | Yes | No |

Yugoslavia: Due to the breakup of the country and the ensuing warfare, Yugoslavia was disqualified from European club competitions, a situation that would last for three seasons. Their three slots in the UEFA Cup were allocated as a third berth for associations 9-11, namely Russia, Romania, and Czechoslovakia. In Yugoslavia, Vojvodina, Zemun and Rad would have qualified by league position.
Soviet Union & Russia: After the dissolution of the Soviet Union and the agreement with Ukraine and UEFA, Russia had become the formal successor for all Soviet football heritage. The 1992 UEFA rankings still reflected the Soviet Union, as the Russian association was yet to make its independent debut at the time, but all three of its places were awarded through the 1992 Russian Top League, which only featured Russian teams
Czechoslovakia, Czech Republic & Slovakia: Halfway through the 1992–93 Czechoslovak First League, Czechoslovakia was formally dissolved into two new countries, the Czech Republic and Slovakia. With the original allocation of three teams into place, one Czech team and two Slovak teams qualified, each of them now representing their own association. All Czechoslovak football heritage was attributed to both the Czech Republic and Slovakia while they simultaneously have a new ranking moving forward.
East Germany, Slovenia & Ukraine: Teams from East Germany represented the country in the first three years accounted for in the 1992 UEFA rankings, but the country had long been reunificated into Germany, and UEFA no more considered East Germany, which would've been granted two spots. In the previous season, Slovenia had benefitted from the subsequent reorganization by taking the vacant spot that resulted from other countries moving up, and was awarded one place again despite their previous results not being counted yet towards the rankings. In the other hand, Ukraine had a team in the previous UEFA Cup through the Soviet league, and now had its own league. In order for them to have a spot, it was taken from association 21, Hungary, which would regain it anyway due to the ban imposed on Poland.
Poland: ŁKS Łódź and Lech Poznan originally qualified for the UEFA Cup on June 20 by finishing second and third in the 1992-93 Ekstraklasa. However, the events of the final game day, known as the Sunday of Miracles, prompted the Polish association to cancel the results of the original champions Legia Warsaw and ŁKS Łódź on July 10 over allegations of bribery, giving Lech Poznan the title. Subsequently, UEFA disqualified both Legia Warsaw and ŁKS Łódź from taking part in the UEFA Cup, and forfeited both berths. These slots were allocated as a second berth for associations 21–22, namely Hungary and Bulgaria.
Wales: Despite the formation of the League of Wales in 1992, UEFA did not award the country a place in the UEFA Cup due to the 64-team format, like many other of the new football leagues at the time. The Football Association of Wales still qualified a team for the UEFA Champions League, while the Welsh Cup continued to provide a winner (or best-placed Welsh team as several English teams also competed) in the UEFA Cup Winners' Cup. Its virtual ranking is only an original research, because the UEFA country ranking was only used to allocate the UEFA Cup spots at time, so Wales was not included.
Albania: After one year of exclusion due to the Fall of communism in the country and subsequent instability, Albania rejoined European competitions, but elected not to enter a team in the UEFA Cup. Their slot was allocated as a third berth to association 12, Scotland. In Albania, Teuta would have qualified by league position.

=== Teams ===
The labels in parentheses show how each team qualified for competition:

- TH: Title holders
- CW: Cup winners
- CR: Cup runners-up
- LC: League Cup winners
- 2nd, 3rd, 4th, 5th, 6th, etc.: League position
- P-W: End-of-season European competition play-offs winners

Qualified teams for 1993–94 UEFA Cup
| (Italy) Inter Milan (2nd) | (Italy) Juventus (4th)^{TH} | (Italy) Lazio (5th) | (Italy) Cagliari (6th) |
| (Germany) Bayern Munich (2nd) | (Germany) Eintracht Frankfurt (3rd) | (Germany) Borussia Dortmund (4th) | (Germany) Karlsruhe (6th) |
| (Spain) Deportivo La Coruña (3rd) | (Spain) Valencia (4th) | (Spain) Tenerife (5th) | (Spain) Atlético Madrid (6th) |
| (Belgium) Mechelen (3rd) | (Belgium) Waregem (4th) | (Belgium) Antwerp (5th) | (France) Bordeaux (4th) |
| (France) Nantes (5th) | (France) Auxerre (6th) | (Netherlands) PSV Eindhoven (2nd) | (Netherlands) Vitesse (4th) |
| (Netherlands) Twente (5th) | (Portugal) Sporting CP (3rd) | (Portugal) Boavista (4th) | (Portugal) Marítimo (5th) |
| (Russia) Spartak Vladikavkaz (2nd) | (Russia) Dynamo Moscow (3rd) | (Russia) Lokomotiv Moscow (4th) | (Romania) Dinamo București (2nd) |
| (Romania) Rapid București (4th) | (Romania) Gloria Bistrița (5th) | (Czech Republic) Slavia Prague (2nd) | (Slovakia) Slovan Bratislava (3rd) |
| (Slovakia) DAC Dunajská (4th) | (Scotland) Celtic (3rd) | (Scotland) Dundee United (4th) | (Scotland) Heart of Midlothian (5th) |
| (England) Aston Villa (2nd) | (England) Norwich City (3rd) | Austria Salzburg (2nd) | (Austria) Admira/Wacker (3rd) |
| (Denmark) Brøndby (2nd) | (Denmark) AaB (3rd) | (Greece) Olympiacos (3rd) | (Greece) OFI (4th) |
| (Turkey) Trabzonspor (3rd) | (Turkey) Kocaelispor (4th) | (Switzerland) Young Boys (2nd) | (Switzerland) Servette FC (3rd) |
| (Sweden) Norrköping (2nd) | (Sweden) Öster (3rd) | (Hungary) Vác (2nd) | (Hungary) MTK Hungária (4th) |
| (Bulgaria) Botev Plovdiv (3rd) | (Bulgaria) Lokomotiv Plovdiv (4th) | (Finland) Kuusysi Lahti (2nd) | (Iceland) KR (2nd) |
| (Norway) Kongsvinger (2nd) | (Cyprus) Apollon (2nd) | (Northern Ireland) Crusaders (2nd) | (Republic of Ireland) Bohemians (2nd) |
| (Malta) Valletta (P-W) | Union Luxembourg (2nd) | (Ukraine) Dnipro Dnipropetrovsk (2nd) | (Slovenia) Maribor (2nd) |

Notes

1. France: Monaco qualified for the UEFA Cup by finishing third in the 1992–93 French Division 1, but the team was promoted to the UEFA Champions League after Marseille was disqualified due to its involvement in the French football bribery scandal and Paris Saint-Germain refused to take the title or Marseille's UEC place, remaining in the UEFA Cup Winners' Cup instead. Auxerre, the next best team not qualified for European competition, took its place in the UEFA Cup.

== Schedule ==
The schedule of the competition was as follows. Matches were scheduled for Tuesdays, Wednesdays and Thursdays.

Schedule for 1993–94 UEFA Cup
| Round | First leg | Second leg |
|---|---|---|
| First round | 14–16 September 1993 | 28–30 September 1993 |
| Second round | 19–20 October 1993 | 2–4 November 1993 |
| Third round | 23–25 November 1993 | 7–8 December 1993 |
| Quarter-finals | 1–3 March 1994 | 15–17 March 1994 |
| Semi-finals | 29–30 March 1994 | 12 April 1994 |
| Final | 26 April 1994 | 11 May 1994 |

== First round ==
| Team 1 | Agg. | Team 2 | 1st leg | 2nd leg |
|---|---|---|---|---|
| AaB (Denmark) | 1–5 | (Spain) Deportivo La Coruña | 1–0 | 0–5 |
| Bohemians (Republic of Ireland) | 0–6 | (France) Bordeaux | 0–1 | 0–5 |
| Borussia Dortmund (Germany) | 1–0 | (Russia) Spartak Vladikavkaz | 0–0 | 1–0 |
| Brøndby (Denmark) | 3–3 (a) | (Scotland) Dundee United | 2–0 | 1–3 (a.e.t.) |
| Young Boys (Switzerland) | 0–1 | (Scotland) Celtic | 0–0 | 0–1 (a.e.t.) |
| Tenerife (Spain) | 3–2 | (France) Auxerre | 2–2 | 1–0 |
| Crusaders (Northern Ireland) | 0–4 | (Switzerland) Servette | 0–0 | 0–4 |
| Dinamo București (Romania) | 3–4 | (Italy) Cagliari | 3–2 | 0–2 |
| Dynamo Moscow (Russia) | 2–7 | (Germany) Eintracht Frankfurt | 0–6 | 2–1 |
| Dnipro Dnipropetrovsk (Ukraine) | 4–2 | (Austria) Admira Wacker | 1–0 | 3–2 |
| Kuusysi (Finland) | 6–1 | (Belgium) Waregem | 4–0 | 2–1 |
| Nantes (France) | 2–4 | (Spain) Valencia | 1–1 | 1–3 (a.e.t.) |
| Twente (Netherlands) | 3–7 | (Germany) Bayern Munich | 3–4 | 0–3 |
| Gloria Bistrița (Romania) | 0–2 | (Slovenia) Maribor | 0–0 | 0–2 |
| Heart of Midlothian (Scotland) | 2–4 | (Spain) Atlético Madrid | 2–1 | 0–3 |
| IFK Norrköping (Sweden) | 1–2 | (Belgium) Mechelen | 0–1 | 1–1 (a.e.t.) |
| Inter Milan (Italy) | 5–1 | (Romania) Rapid București | 3–1 | 2–0 |
| Juventus (Italy) | 4–0 | (Russia) Lokomotiv Moscow | 3–0 | 1–0 |
| Karlsruhe (Germany) | 2–1 | (Netherlands) PSV Eindhoven | 2–1 | 0–0 |
| KR (Iceland) | 1–2 | (Hungary) MTK | 1–2 | 0–0 |
| Kocaelispor (Turkey) | 0–2 | (Portugal) Sporting CP | 0–0 | 0–2 |
| Norwich City (England) | 3–0 | (Netherlands) Vitesse | 3–0 | 0–0 |
| Östers IF (Sweden) | 2–7 | (Norway) Kongsvinger | 1–3 | 1–4 |
| Botev Plovdiv (Bulgaria) | 3–8 | (Greece) Olympiacos | 2–3 | 1–5 |
| Royal Antwerp (Belgium) | 4–2 | (Portugal) Marítimo | 2–0 | 2–2 |
| Austria Salzburg | 4–0 | (Slovakia) DAC Dunajská Streda | 2–0 | 2–0 |
| Lazio (Italy) | 4–0 | (Bulgaria) Lokomotiv Plovdiv | 2–0 | 2–0 |
| Slavia Prague (Czech Republic) | 1–2 | (Greece) OFI | 1–1 | 0–1 |
| Slovan Bratislava (Slovakia) | 1–2 | (England) Aston Villa | 0–0 | 1–2 |
| Trabzonspor (Turkey) | 6–2 | (Malta) Valletta | 3–1 | 3–1 |
| Union Luxembourg | 0–5 | (Portugal) Boavista | 0–1 | 0–4 |
| Vác (Hungary) | 2–4 | (Cyprus) Apollon Limassol | 2–0 | 0–4 (a.e.t.) |

=== First leg ===
14 September 1993
16:30

| Vác (Hungary) | 2–0 | (Cyprus) Apollon Limassol |
|---|---|---|
| Szedlacsek 42'; Nyilas 80' | Report |

Ligeti Stadion, Vác
Attendance: 1,687
Referee: Wilfred Wallace (Republic of Ireland)

14 September 1993
17:00

| Dynamo Moscow (Russia) | 0–6 | (Germany) Eintracht Frankfurt |
|---|---|---|
| | Report | Gaudino 8'; Weber 25'; Furtok 44'; Bein 47'; Okocha 80'; Yeboah 88' |

Central Dynamo Stadium, Moscow
Attendance: 14,000
Referee: Gianni Beschin (Italy)

14 September 1993
18:00

| Dnipro Dnipropetrovsk (Ukraine) | 1–0 | (Austria) Admira Wacker |
|---|---|---|
| Maksymov 76' | Report |

Meteor Stadium, Dnipropetrovsk
Attendance: 12,000
Referee: Bülent Yavuz (Turkey)

14 September 1993
18:00

| Kuusysi (Finland) | 4–0 | (Belgium) Waregem |
|---|---|---|
| Annunen 17'; Lius 19', 75'; Lehtinen 25' | Report |

Lahden kisapuisto, Lahti
Attendance: 1,072
Referee: Yuri Chebotarev (Russia)

14 September 1993
19:00

| Austria Salzburg | 2–0 | (Slovakia) DAC Dunajská Streda |
|---|---|---|
| Amerhauser 40'; Pfeifenberger 85' | Report |

Stadion Lehen, Salzburg
Attendance: 5,085
Referee: Walter Cinciripini (Italy)

14 September 1993
20:00

| Young Boys (Switzerland) | 0–0 | (Scotland) Celtic |
|---|---|---|
| | Report |

Stadion Wankdorf, Bern
Attendance: 7,300
Referee: István Vad (Hungary)

14 September 1993
20:00

| Royal Antwerp (Belgium) | 2–0 | (Portugal) Marítimo |
|---|---|---|
| Severeyns 48'; Bursać 90' | Report |

Bosuilstadion, Antwerp
Attendance: 3,877
Referee: Hellmut Krug (Germany)

14 September 1993
20:30

| AaB (Denmark) | 1–0 | (Spain) Deportivo La Coruña |
|---|---|---|
| Thorst 66' | Report |

Aalborg Stadion, Aalborg
Attendance: 8,100
Referee: Hugh Dallas (Scotland)

14 September 1993
20:30

| Karlsruhe (Germany) | 2–1 | (Netherlands) PSV Eindhoven |
|---|---|---|
| Schmitt 21'; Kiryakov 30' | Report | Popescu 36' (pen.) |

Wildparkstadion, Karlsruhe
Attendance: 25,487
Referee: João Pinto Correia (Portugal)

14 September 1993
20:45

| Bohemians (Republic of Ireland) | 0–1 | (France) Bordeaux |
|---|---|---|
| | Report | Dugarry 16' |

Dalymount Park, Dublin
Attendance: 5,453
Referee: Stelios Charlavanis (Greece)

14 September 1993
20:45

| Union Luxembourg | 0–1 | (Portugal) Boavista |
|---|---|---|
| | Report | Casaca 40' |

Stade Josy Barthel, Luxembourg
Attendance: 1,067
Referee: Plarent Kotherja (Albania)

14 September 1993
21:00

| Heart of Midlothian (Scotland) | 2–1 | (Spain) Atlético Madrid |
|---|---|---|
| Robertson 70'; Colquhoun 75' | Report | Kosecki 78' |

Tynecastle Park, Edinburgh
Attendance: 15,596
Referee: Anders Frisk (Sweden)

15 September 1993
13:00

| Trabzonspor (Turkey) | 3–1 | (Malta) Valletta |
|---|---|---|
| Ogün 28', 39'; Hami 29' | Report | Zarb 25' |

Hüseyin Avni Aker Stadium, Trabzon
Attendance: 14,000
Referee: Daniel Roduit (Switzerland)

15 September 1993
15:00

| Kocaelispor (Turkey) | 0–0 | (Portugal) Sporting CP |
|---|---|---|
| | Report |

İzmit İsmetpaşa Stadium, İzmit
Attendance: 15,000
Referee: Volodymyr Pianykh (Ukraine)

15 September 1993
15:30

| Gloria Bistrița (Romania) | 0–0 | (Slovenia) Maribor |
|---|---|---|
| | Report |

Stadionul Municipal Gloria, Bistrița
Attendance: 3,800
Referee: Michel Zen-Ruffinen (Switzerland)

15 September 1993
15:45

| Slovan Bratislava (Slovakia) | 0–0 | (England) Aston Villa |
|---|---|---|
| | Report |

Tehelné pole, Bratislava
Attendance: 10,886
Referee: Marcello Nicchi (Italy)

15 September 1993
16:00

| Botev Plovdiv (Bulgaria) | 2–3 | (Greece) Olympiacos |
|---|---|---|
| Bakalov 45'; Hvoynev 88' | Report | Amanatidis 12'; Tsiantakis 57'; Batista 85' |

Stadion Hristo Botev, Plovdiv
Attendance: 19,500
Referee: Jiří Ulrich (Czech Republic)

15 September 1993
18:00

| Slavia Prague (Czech Republic) | 1–1 | (Greece) OFI |
|---|---|---|
| Berger 52' | Report | Georgamlis 59' (pen.) |

Stadion Eden, Prague
Attendance: 4,106
Referee: Hans-Jürgen Weber (Germany)

15 September 1993
18:45

| Borussia Dortmund (Germany) | 0–0 | (Russia) Spartak Vladikavkaz |
|---|---|---|
| | Report |

Westfalenstadion, Dortmund
Attendance: 34,539
Referee: Brian Hill (England)

15 September 1993
19:00

| Brøndby (Denmark) | 2–0 | (Scotland) Dundee United |
|---|---|---|
| Vilfort 20'; Kristensen 46' | Report |

Brøndby Stadium, Brøndbyvester
Attendance: 5,756
Referee: Markus Merk (Germany)

15 September 1993
19:00

| IFK Norrköping (Sweden) | 0–1 | (Belgium) Mechelen |
|---|---|---|
| | Report | Czerniatynski 45' |

Norrköpings Idrottspark, Norrköping
Attendance: 5,557
Referee: Mike Reed (England)

15 September 1993
19:00

| Östers IF (Sweden) | 1–3 | (Norway) Kongsvinger |
|---|---|---|
| Persson 35' | Report | Engerbakk 32'; Francis 56'; Frigård 57' |

Värendsvallen, Växjö
Attendance: 1,956
Referee: Lubomír Puček (Czech Republic)

15 September 1993
20:00

| Juventus (Italy) | 3–0 | (Russia) Lokomotiv Moscow |
|---|---|---|
| R. Baggio 49', 86'; Ravanelli 69' | Report |

Stadio Renato Dall'Ara, Bologna
Attendance: 25,267
Referee: Alfred Wieser (Austria)

15 September 1993
20:30

| Twente (Netherlands) | 3–4 | (Germany) Bayern Munich |
|---|---|---|
| Boerebach 65'; Polley 72'; Vurens 77' | Report | Nerlinger 11'; Ziege 28', 90'; Scholl 67' |

Diekman Stadion, Enschede
Attendance: 14,850
Referee: Jorge Coroado (Portugal)

15 September 1993
20:30

| Inter Milan (Italy) | 3–1 | (Romania) Rapid București |
|---|---|---|
| Bergkamp 12' (pen.), 67', 79' | Report | Andrași 52' |

San Siro, Milan
Attendance: 21,983
Referee: Karl-Josef Assenmacher (Germany)

15 September 1993
20:30

| Lazio (Italy) | 2–0 | (Bulgaria) Lokomotiv Plovdiv |
|---|---|---|
| Casiraghi 22'; Cravero 55' | Report |

Stadio Olimpico, Rome
Attendance: 48,012
Referee: Michał Listkiewicz (Poland)

15 September 1993
20:45

| Norwich City (England) | 3–0 | (Netherlands) Vitesse |
|---|---|---|
| Ekoku 51'; Goss 68'; Polston 71' | Report |

Carrow Road, Norwich
Attendance: 16,818
Referee: Robert Sedlacek (Austria)

15 September 1993
22:00

| Tenerife (Spain) | 2–2 | (France) Auxerre |
|---|---|---|
| Pinilla 19' (pen.); Felipe 70' | Report | Vahirua 16'; Saïb 21' |

Estadio Heliodoro Rodríguez López, Santa Cruz de Tenerife
Attendance: 12,948
Referee: Mario van der Ende (Netherlands)

16 September 1993
19:30

| Dinamo București (Romania) | 3–2 | (Italy) Cagliari |
|---|---|---|
| Moldovan 5', 30'; C. Pană 87' (pen.) | Report | Prunea 13' (o.g.); Dely Valdés 38' |

Stadionul Național, Bucharest
Attendance: 10,000
Referee: Leif Sundell (Sweden)

16 September 1993
19:30

| KR (Iceland) | 1–2 | (Hungary) MTK |
|---|---|---|
| Ingimundarson 90' | Report | Hámori 35'; Zsivóczky 68' |

Laugardalsvöllur, Reykjavík
Attendance: 505
Referee: Alan Howells (Wales)

16 September 1993
20:45

| Nantes (France) | 1–1 | (Spain) Valencia |
|---|---|---|
| Ouédec 12' | Report | Mijatović 15' |

Stade de la Beaujoire, Nantes
Attendance: 14,766
Referee: Ion Crăciunescu (Romania)

=== Second leg ===
28 September 1993
15:00

| DAC Dunajská Streda (Slovakia) | 0–2 | Austria Salzburg |
|---|---|---|
| | Report | Stadler 19'; Pfeifenberger 59' |

Mestský štadión, Dunajská Streda
Attendance: 7,900
Referee: Christer Fällström (Sweden)

Austria Salzburg won 4–0 on aggregate.

28 September 1993
15:30

| Spartak Vladikavkaz (Russia) | 0–1 | (Germany) Borussia Dortmund |
|---|---|---|
| | Report | Chapuisat 61' |

Republican Spartak Stadium, Vladikavkaz
Attendance: 28,000
Referee: Ion Crăciunescu (Romania)

Borussia Dortmund won 1–0 on aggregate.

28 September 1993
18:00

| Bordeaux (France) | 5–0 | (Republic of Ireland) Bohemians |
|---|---|---|
| Zidane 22'; Vercruysse 25', 86'; Paille 60'; Fofana 68' | Report |

Stade du Parc Lescure, Bordeaux
Attendance: 5,691
Referee: Kurt Röthlisberger (Switzerland)

Bordeaux won 6–0 on aggregate.

28 September 1993
18:00

| Eintracht Frankfurt (Germany) | 1–2 | (Russia) Dynamo Moscow |
|---|---|---|
| Furtok 65' | Report | Simutenkov 23'; Dobrovolski 54' |

Waldstadion, Frankfurt
Attendance: 4,900
Referee: Bohdan Benedik (Slovakia)

Eintracht Frankfurt won 7–2 on aggregate.

28 September 1993
18:00

| Lokomotiv Moscow (Russia) | 0–1 | (Italy) Juventus |
|---|---|---|
| | Report | Marocchi 53' |

Lokomotiv Stadium, Moscow
Attendance: 8,000
Referee: Kim Milton Nielsen (Denmark)

Juventus won 4–0 on aggregate.

28 September 1993
19:30

| Admira Wacker (Austria) | 2–3 | (Ukraine) Dnipro Dnipropetrovsk |
|---|---|---|
| Bacher 45'; Ljung 90' | Report | Bezhenar 43' (pen.); Pokhlebayev 48'; Mykhaylenko 68' |

Bundesstadion Südstadt, Maria Enzersdorf
Attendance: 7,300
Referee: Jim McCluskey (Scotland)

Dnipro Dnipropetrovsk won 4–2 on aggregate.

28 September 1993
19:30

| Boavista (Portugal) | 4–0 | Union Luxembourg |
|---|---|---|
| Artur 18', 26'; Brandão 29'; Ricky 85' | Report |

Estádio do Bessa, Porto
Attendance: 1,800
Referee: Brendan Shorte (Republic of Ireland)

Boavista won 5–0 on aggregate.

28 September 1993
19:45

| Valletta (Malta) | 1–3 | (Turkey) Trabzonspor |
|---|---|---|
| Zarb 81' | Report | Hami 11'; Ogün 44'; Ünal 61' |

National Stadium, Ta' Qali
Attendance: 1,923
Referee: José Veiga Trigo (Portugal)

Trabzonspor won 6–2 on aggregate.

28 September 1993
20:00

| Servette (Switzerland) | 4–0 | (Northern Ireland) Crusaders |
|---|---|---|
| Anderson 57'; Dunlop 58' (o.g.); Giallanza 60', 69' | Report |

Stade des Charmilles, Geneva
Attendance: 5,200
Referee: Lyube Spasov (Bulgaria)

Servette won 4–0 on aggregate.

28 September 1993
20:00

| Mechelen (Belgium) | 1–1 (a.e.t.) | (Sweden) IFK Norrköping |
|---|---|---|
| Eszenyi 113' | Report | Blohm 33' |

Achter de Kazerne, Mechelen
Attendance: 5,360
Referee: John McDonald (Northern Ireland)

Mechelen won 2–1 on aggregate.

28 September 1993
20:15

| Atlético Madrid (Spain) | 3–0 | (Scotland) Heart of Midlothian |
|---|---|---|
| Pedro 34'; Manolo 72'; Luis García 76' | Report |

Estadio Vicente Calderón, Madrid
Attendance: 19,205
Referee: Guy Goethals (Belgium)

Atlético Madrid won 4-2 on aggregate.

28 September 1993
20:30

| Dundee United (Scotland) | 3–1 (a.e.t.) | (Denmark) Brøndby |
|---|---|---|
| McKinlay 75'; Crabbe 79'; Clark 119' | Report | Kristensen 91' |

Tannadice Park, Dundee
Attendance: 8,541
Referee: Gerd Grabher (Austria)

3–3 on aggregate; Brøndby won on away goals.

28 September 1993
20:30

| PSV Eindhoven (Netherlands) | 0–0 | (Germany) Karlsruhe |
|---|---|---|
| | Report |

Philips Stadion, Eindhoven
Attendance: 17,000
Referee: Antonio Martín Navarrete (Spain)

Karlsruhe won 2–1 on aggregate.

28 September 1993
20:30

| Marítimo (Portugal) | 2–2 | (Belgium) Royal Antwerp |
|---|---|---|
| Heitor 67'; Vado 77' | Report | Severeyns 36'; Segers 41' |

Estádio dos Barreiros, Funchal
Attendance: 3,719
Referee: Gilles Veissière (France)

Royal Antwerp won 4–2 on aggregate.

28 September 1993
21:00

| Deportivo La Coruña (Spain) | 5–0 | (Denmark) AaB |
|---|---|---|
| Bebeto 19', 52', 72'; Claudio 68', 86' | Report |

Estadio Riazor, A Coruña
Attendance: 20,000
Referee: John Lloyd (Wales)

Deportivo La Coruña won 5–1 on aggregate.

29 September 1993
13:30

| Lokomotiv Plovdiv (Bulgaria) | 0–2 | (Italy) Lazio |
|---|---|---|
| | Report | Luzardi 22'; Cravero 66' |

Stadion Lokomotiv, Plovdiv
Attendance: 27,136
Referee: Éric Blareau (Belgium)

Lazio won 4–0 on aggregate.

29 September 1993
14:30

| Kongsvinger (Norway) | 4–1 | (Sweden) Östers IF |
|---|---|---|
| Frigård 36', 82', 89'; Engerbakk 45' | Report | Landberg 41' (pen.) |

Gjemselund Stadion, Kongsvinger
Attendance: 3,759
Referee: Roger Philippi (Luxembourg)

Kongsvinger won 7–2 on aggregate.

29 September 1993
14:30

| OFI (Greece) | 1–0 | (Czech Republic) Slavia Prague |
|---|---|---|
| Machlas 43' | Report |

Genti Koule, Heraklion
Attendance: 9,000
Referee: Atanas Uzunov (Bulgaria)

OFI won 2–1 on aggregate.

29 September 1993
15:00

| Maribor (Slovenia) | 2–0 | (Romania) Gloria Bistrița |
|---|---|---|
| Stanič 6', 76' | Report |

Ljudski vrt, Maribor
Attendance: 6,100
Referee: Erman Toroğlu (Turkey)

Maribor won 2–0 on aggregate.

29 September 1993
17:30

| Olympiacos (Greece) | 5–1 | (Bulgaria) Botev Plovdiv |
|---|---|---|
| Christensen 37', 78'; Tsiantakis 72'; Mitsibonas 76' (pen.); Batista 85' | Report | K. Dimitrov 69' (pen.) |

Karaiskakis Stadium, Piraeus
Attendance: 18,000
Referee: Pierluigi Pairetto (Italy)

Olympiacos won 8–3 on aggregate.

29 September 1993
18:00

| Rapid București (Romania) | 0–2 | (Italy) Inter Milan |
|---|---|---|
| | Report | Battistini 75'; Jonk 82' |

Stadionul Național, Bucharest
Attendance: 10,286
Referee: Jaap Uilenberg (Netherlands)

Inter Milan won 5–1 on aggregate.

29 September 1993
18:00

| MTK (Hungary) | 0–0 | (Iceland) KR |
|---|---|---|
| | Report |

MTK Stadion, Budapest
Attendance: 1,500
Referee: Aron Huzu (Romania)

MTK won 2–1 on aggregate.

29 September 1993
18:15

| Apollon Limassol (Cyprus) | 4–0 (a.e.t.) | (Hungary) Vác |
|---|---|---|
| Šćepović 40', 66'; Špoljarić 110' (pen.); Krčmarević 118' | Report |

Tsirio Stadium, Limassol
Attendance: 2,203
Referee: Lawrence Sammut (Malta)

Apollon Limassol won 4–2 on aggregate.

29 September 1993
18:45

| Vitesse (Netherlands) | 0–0 | (England) Norwich City |
|---|---|---|
| | Report |

Nieuw Monnikenhuize, Arnhem
Attendance: 9,133
Referee: Theodoros Kefalas (Greece)

Norwich City won 3–0 on aggregate.

29 September 1993
20:00

| Auxerre (France) | 0–1 | (Spain) Tenerife |
|---|---|---|
| | Report | Felipe 67' |

Stade de l'Abbé-Deschamps, Auxerre
Attendance: 13,718
Referee: David Elleray (England)

Tenerife won 3–2 on aggregate.

29 September 1993
20:00

| Waregem (Belgium) | 1–2 | (Finland) Kuusysi |
|---|---|---|
| De Kneef 54' | Report | Annunen 80'; Lius 89' |

Regenboogstadion, Waregem
Attendance: 4,417
Referee: Martin Bodenham (England)

Kuusysi won 6–1 on aggregate.

29 September 1993
20:30

| Celtic (Scotland) | 1–0 (a.e.t.) | (Switzerland) Young Boys |
|---|---|---|
| Baumann 104' (o.g.) | Report |

Celtic Park, Glasgow
Attendance: 18,776
Referee: Jef van Vliet (Netherlands)

Celtic won 1–0 on aggregate.

29 September 1993
20:30

| Cagliari (Italy) | 2–0 | (Romania) Dinamo București |
|---|---|---|
| Matteoli 6' (pen.); Oliveira 63' | Report |

Stadio Sant'Elia, Cagliari
Attendance: 28,554
Referee: Rémi Harrel (France)

Cagliari won 4–3 on aggregate.

29 September 1993
20:30

| Bayern Munich (Germany) | 3–0 | (Netherlands) Twente |
|---|---|---|
| Matthäus 19' (pen.); Karnebeek 45' (o.g.); Ziege 62' | Report |

Olympiastadion, Munich
Attendance: 23,400
Referee: Alfredo Trentalange (Italy)

Bayern Munich won 7–3 on aggregate.

29 September 1993
20:45

| Aston Villa (England) | 2–1 | (Slovakia) Slovan Bratislava |
|---|---|---|
| Atkinson 15'; Townsend 22' | Report | Tittel 86' |

Villa Park, Birmingham
Attendance: 24,461
Referee: Peter Mikkelsen (Denmark)

Aston Villa won 2–1 on aggregate.

29 September 1993
22:00

| Sporting CP (Portugal) | 2–0 | (Turkey) Kocaelispor |
|---|---|---|
| Cadete 6'; Pacheco 57' | Report |

Estádio José Alvalade, Lisbon
Attendance: 47,800
Referee: Mario van der Ende (Netherlands)

Sporting CP won 2–0 on aggregate.

30 September 1993
21:15

| Valencia (Spain) | 3–1 (a.e.t.) | (France) Nantes |
|---|---|---|
| Penev 72' (pen.); Gálvez 105'; Fernando 112' | Report | Pedros 50' |

Estadio Luis Casanova, Valencia
Attendance: 46,700
Referee: Leslie Mottram (Scotland)

Valencia won 4–2 on aggregate.

== Second round ==
| Team 1 | Agg. | Team 2 | 1st leg | 2nd leg |
|---|---|---|---|---|
| Atlético Madrid (Spain) | 1–2 | (Greece) OFI | 1–0 | 0–2 |
| Bayern Munich (Germany) | 2–3 | (England) Norwich City | 1–2 | 1–1 |
| Tenerife (Spain) | 5–5 (a) | (Greece) Olympiacos | 2–1 | 3–4 |
| Celtic (Scotland) | 1–2 | (Portugal) Sporting CP | 1–0 | 0–2 |
| Deportivo La Coruña (Spain) | 2–1 | (England) Aston Villa | 1–1 | 1–0 |
| Eintracht Frankfurt (Germany) | 2–1 | (Ukraine) Dnipro Dnipropetrovsk | 2–0 | 0–1 |
| Bordeaux (France) | 3–1 | (Switzerland) Servette | 2–1 | 1–0 |
| Kuusysi (Finland) | 2–7 | (Denmark) Brøndby | 1–4 | 1–3 |
| Inter Milan (Italy) | 4–3 | (Cyprus) Apollon Limassol | 1–0 | 3–3 |
| Kongsvinger (Norway) | 1–3 | (Italy) Juventus | 1–1 | 0–2 |
| Maribor (Slovenia) | 1–2 | (Germany) Borussia Dortmund | 0–0 | 1–2 |
| Austria Salzburg | 2–0 | (Belgium) Royal Antwerp | 1–0 | 1–0 |
| Lazio (Italy) | 1–2 | (Portugal) Boavista | 1–0 | 0–2 |
| Trabzonspor (Turkey) | 1–1 (a) | (Italy) Cagliari | 1–1 | 0–0 |
| Valencia (Spain) | 3–8 | (Germany) Karlsruhe | 3–1 | 0–7 |
| Mechelen (Belgium) | 6–1 | (Hungary) MTK | 5–0 | 1–1 |

=== First leg ===
19 October 1993
18:00

| Kuusysi (Finland) | 1–4 | (Denmark) Brøndby |
|---|---|---|
| Lius 13' | Report | Okechukwu 2'; Vilfort 55'; Strudal 66', 86' |

Lahden kisapuisto, Lahti
Attendance: 2,282
Referee: Gylfi Orrason (Iceland)

19 October 1993
19:00

| Eintracht Frankfurt (Germany) | 2–0 | (Ukraine) Dnipro Dnipropetrovsk |
|---|---|---|
| Furtok 65'; Okocha 78' | Report |

Waldstadion, Frankfurt
Attendance: 6,900
Referee: José María García-Aranda (Spain)

19 October 1993
19:00

| Austria Salzburg | 1–0 | (Belgium) Royal Antwerp |
|---|---|---|
| Jurčević 67' | Report |

Stadion Lehen, Salzburg
Attendance: 8,700
Referee: Loizos Loizou (Cyprus)

19 October 1993
20:15

| Atlético Madrid (Spain) | 1–0 | (Greece) OFI |
|---|---|---|
| Luis García 58' | Report |

Estadio Vicente Calderón, Madrid
Attendance: 11,600
Referee: Brian Hill (England)

19 October 1993
20:30

| Bordeaux (France) | 2–1 | (Switzerland) Servette |
|---|---|---|
| Paille 36'; Vercruysse 56' | Report | Anderson 55' |

Stade du Parc Lescure, Bordeaux
Attendance: 10,530
Referee: Alan Snoddy (Northern Ireland)

19 October 1993
20:45

| Bayern Munich (Germany) | 1–2 | (England) Norwich City |
|---|---|---|
| Nerlinger 41' | Report | Goss 13'; Bowen 30' |

Olympiastadion, Munich
Attendance: 28,500
Referee: Leif Sundell (Sweden)

19 October 1993
21:00

| Tenerife (Spain) | 2–1 | (Greece) Olympiacos |
|---|---|---|
| Llorente 38' del Solar 49' | Report | Christensen 10' |

Estadio Heliodoro Rodríguez López, Santa Cruz de Tenerife
Attendance: 14,114
Referee: Robert Sedlacek (Austria)

19 October 1993
21:00

| Deportivo La Coruña (Spain) | 1–1 | (England) Aston Villa |
|---|---|---|
| Riesco 87' | Report | Saunders 79' |

Estadio Riazor, A Coruña
Attendance: 11,237
Referee: Marc Batta (France)

20 October 1993
12:30

| Trabzonspor (Turkey) | 1–1 | (Italy) Cagliari |
|---|---|---|
| Orhan Çıkırıkçı 27' | Report | Dely Valdés 90' |

Hüseyin Avni Aker Stadium, Trabzon
Attendance: 12,600
Referee: László Vágner (Hungary)

20 October 1993
14:30

| Maribor (Slovenia) | 0–0 | (Germany) Borussia Dortmund |
|---|---|---|
| | Report |

Ljudski vrt, Maribor
Attendance: 10,000
Referee: Anders Frisk (Sweden)

20 October 1993
19:00

| Kongsvinger (Norway) | 1–1 | (Italy) Juventus |
|---|---|---|
| Frigård 90' | Report | Kohler 60' |

Ullevaal Stadion, Oslo
Attendance: 10,230
Referee: Michel Piraux (Belgium)

20 October 1993
19:45

| Celtic (Scotland) | 1–0 | (Portugal) Sporting CP |
|---|---|---|
| Creaney 9' | Report |

Celtic Park, Glasgow
Attendance: 31,321
Referee: Bernd Heynemann (Germany)

20 October 1993
20:00

| Mechelen (Belgium) | 5–0 | (Hungary) MTK |
|---|---|---|
| Eszenyi 44', 80', 83'; De Boeck 59'; Leen 72' | Report |

Achter de Kazerne, Mechelen
Attendance: 5,528
Referee: Jorge Coroado (Portugal)

20 October 1993
20:30

| Inter Milan (Italy) | 1–0 | (Cyprus) Apollon Limassol |
|---|---|---|
| Bergkamp 7' | Report |

San Siro, Milan
Attendance: 12,211
Referee: Roger Philippi (Luxembourg)

20 October 1993
20:30

| Lazio (Italy) | 1–0 | (Portugal) Boavista |
|---|---|---|
| Winter 74' | Report |

Stadio Olimpico, Rome
Attendance: 34,250
Referee: Arie Frost (Israel)

20 October 1993
21:45

| Valencia (Spain) | 3–1 | (Germany) Karlsruhe |
|---|---|---|
| Mijatović 35'; Penev 47', 73' | Report | Schmitt 80' |

Estadio Luis Casanova, Valencia
Attendance: 32,000
Referee: Philippe Leduc (France)

=== Second leg ===
2 November 1993
18:00

| Karlsruhe (Germany) | 7–0 | (Spain) Valencia |
|---|---|---|
| Schmitt 29', 34', 59', 63'; Schütterle 37'; Shmarov 46'; Bilić 90' | Report |

Wildparkstadion, Karlsruhe
Attendance: 25,055
Referee: Zbigniew Przesmycki (Poland)

Karlsruhe won 8–3 on aggregate.

2 November 1993
18:00

| MTK (Hungary) | 1–1 | (Belgium) Mechelen |
|---|---|---|
| Kovács 59' | Report | Pereira 8' |

MTK Stadion, Budapest
Attendance: 602
Referee: Lyube Spasov (Bulgaria)

Mechelen won 6–1 on aggregate.

2 November 1993
20:00

| OFI (Greece) | 2–0 | (Spain) Atlético Madrid |
|---|---|---|
| Machlas 52'; Tsifoutis 62' (pen.) | Report |

Genti Koule, Heraklion
Attendance: 12,850
Referee: Jiří Ulrich (Czech Republic)

OFI won 2–1 on aggregate.

2 November 1993
20:00

| Royal Antwerp (Belgium) | 0–1 | Austria Salzburg |
|---|---|---|
| | Report | Feiersinger 84' |

Bosuilstadion, Antwerp
Attendance: 7,793
Referee: Charles Agius (Malta)

Austria Salzburg won 2–0 on aggregate.

2 November 1993
20:30

| Juventus (Italy) | 2–0 | (Norway) Kongsvinger |
|---|---|---|
| Möller 28'; Ravanelli 69' | Report |

Stadio Delle Alpi, Turin
Attendance: 4,115
Referee: Periklis Vasilakis (Greece)

Juventus won 3–1 on aggregate.

3 November 1993
16:15

| Dnipro Dnipropetrovsk (Ukraine) | 1–0 | (Germany) Eintracht Frankfurt |
|---|---|---|
| Chukhleba 37' | Report |

Meteor Stadium, Dnipropetrovsk
Attendance: 21,000
Referee: Simo Ruokonen (Finland)

Eintracht Frankfurt won 2–1 on aggregate.

3 November 1993
17:00

| Apollon Limassol (Cyprus) | 3–3 | (Italy) Inter Milan |
|---|---|---|
| Špoljarić 11'; Šćepović 30'; Iosifidis 85' | Report | Shalimov 6'; Bergkamp 9'; Fontolan 39' |

Tsirio Stadium, Limassol
Attendance: 6,200
Referee: Atanas Uzunov (Bulgaria)

Inter Milan won 4–3 on aggregate.

3 November 1993
17:00

| Borussia Dortmund (Germany) | 2–1 | (Slovenia) Maribor |
|---|---|---|
| Chapuisat 48', 52' | Report | Bozgo 21' |

Westfalenstadion, Dortmund
Attendance: 25,206
Referee: Piero Ceccarini (Italy)

Borussia Dortmund won 2–1 on aggregate.

3 November 1993
19:00

| Brøndby (Denmark) | 3–1 | (Finland) Kuusysi |
|---|---|---|
| Kristensen 39'; Madsen 68'; Høgh 85' (pen.) | Report | Annunen 6' |

Brøndby Stadium, Brøndbyvester
Attendance: 5,834
Referee: Fabio Baldas (Italy)

Brøndby won 7–2 on aggregate.

3 November 1993
20:10

| Norwich City (England) | 1–1 | (Germany) Bayern Munich |
|---|---|---|
| Goss 51' | Report | Valencia 5' |

Carrow Road, Norwich
Attendance: 20,643
Referee: Frans Van Den Wijngaert (Belgium)

Norwich City won 3–2 on aggregate.

3 November 1993
20:15

| Aston Villa (England) | 0–1 | (Spain) Deportivo La Coruña |
|---|---|---|
| | Report | Manjarín 37' |

Villa Park, Birmingham
Attendance: 26,737
Referee: Hans-Jürgen Weber (Germany)

Deportivo La Coruña won 2–1 on aggregate.

3 November 1993
20:30

| Cagliari (Italy) | 0–0 | (Turkey) Trabzonspor |
|---|---|---|
| | Report |

Stadio Sant'Elia, Cagliari
Attendance: 25,742
Referee: Keith Cooper (Wales)

1–1 on aggregate; Cagliari won on away goals.

3 November 1993
20:45

| Servette (Switzerland) | 0–1 | (France) Bordeaux |
|---|---|---|
| | Report | Schepull 65' (o.g.) |

Stade des Charmilles, Geneva
Attendance: 18,000
Referee: Sergei Khusainov (Russia)

Bordeaux won 3–1 on aggregate.

3 November 1993
22:00

| Sporting CP (Portugal) | 2–0 | (Scotland) Celtic |
|---|---|---|
| Cadete 18', 64' | Report |

Estádio José Alvalade, Lisbon
Attendance: 52,000
Referee: Jan Damgaard (Denmark)

Sporting CP won 2–1 on aggregate.

4 November 1993
20:30

| Olympiacos (Greece) | 4–3 | (Spain) Tenerife |
|---|---|---|
| Christensen 12', 34', 84'; Ioannidis 59' | Report | Felipe 27'; Chano 49' (pen.); Amanatidis 80' (o.g.) |

Karaiskakis Stadium, Piraeus
Attendance: 31,000
Referee: Philip Don (England)

5–5 on aggregate; Tenerife won on away goals.

4 November 1993
21:30

| Boavista (Portugal) | 2–0 | (Italy) Lazio |
|---|---|---|
| Ricky 21', 54' | Report |

Estádio do Bessa, Porto
Attendance: 7,000
Referee: Erman Toroğlu (Turkey)

Boavista won 2–1 on aggregate.

== Third round ==
| Team 1 | Agg. | Team 2 | 1st leg | 2nd leg |
|---|---|---|---|---|
| Brøndby (Denmark) | 1–2 | (Germany) Borussia Dortmund | 1–1 | 0–1 |
| Eintracht Frankfurt (Germany) | 2–0 | (Spain) Deportivo La Coruña | 1–0 | 1–0 |
| Bordeaux (France) | 1–3 | (Germany) Karlsruhe | 1–0 | 0–3 |
| Juventus (Italy) | 4–2 | (Spain) Tenerife | 3–0 | 1–2 |
| Norwich City (England) | 0–2 | (Italy) Inter Milan | 0–1 | 0–1 |
| OFI (Greece) | 1–6 | (Portugal) Boavista | 1–4 | 0–2 |
| Sporting CP (Portugal) | 2–3 | Austria Salzburg | 2–0 | 0–3 (a.e.t.) |
| Mechelen (Belgium) | 1–5 | (Italy) Cagliari | 1–3 | 0–2 |

=== First leg ===
23 November 1993
20:00

| OFI (Greece) | 1–4 | (Portugal) Boavista |
|---|---|---|
| Velić 89' | Report | Artur 5', 24', 53'; Ricky 43' |

Genti Koule, Heraklion
Attendance: 8,000
Referee: Joël Quiniou (France)

23 November 1993
20:30

| Eintracht Frankfurt (Germany) | 1–0 | (Spain) Deportivo La Coruña |
|---|---|---|
| Dickhaut 89' | Report |

Waldstadion, Frankfurt
Attendance: 12,000
Referee: Roman Steindl (Austria)

23 November 1993
21:00

| Bordeaux (France) | 1–0 | (Germany) Karlsruhe |
|---|---|---|
| Zidane 77' | Report |

Stade du Parc Lescure, Bordeaux
Attendance: 17,433
Referee: Ahmet Çakar (Turkey)

24 November 1993
18:15

| Juventus (Italy) | 3–0 | (Spain) Tenerife |
|---|---|---|
| Möller 3'; R. Baggio 70' (pen.); Ravanelli 75' | Report |

Stadio Delle Alpi, Turin
Attendance: 7,525
Referee: Bernd Heynemann (Germany)

24 November 1993
18:30

| Brøndby (Denmark) | 1–1 | (Germany) Borussia Dortmund |
|---|---|---|
| Kristensen 19' | Report | Chapuisat 61' |

Brøndby Stadium, Brøndbyvester
Attendance: 16,817
Referee: Jorge Coroado (Portugal)

24 November 1993
19:30

| Sporting CP (Portugal) | 2–0 | Austria Salzburg |
|---|---|---|
| Shcherbakov 24'; Cadete 63' | Report |

Estádio José Alvalade, Lisbon
Attendance: 37,000
Referee: Antonio López Nieto (Spain)

24 November 1993
20:10

| Norwich City (England) | 0–1 | (Italy) Inter Milan |
|---|---|---|
| | Report | Bergkamp 80' (pen.) |

Carrow Road, Norwich
Attendance: 20,805
Referee: Serge Muhmenthaler (Switzerland)

25 November 1993
20:00

| Mechelen (Belgium) | 1–3 | (Italy) Cagliari |
|---|---|---|
| Czerniatynski 38' | Report | Matteoli 33'; Oliveira 82'; Pusceddu 87' |

Achter de Kazerne, Mechelen
Attendance: 6,500
Referee: José María García-Aranda (Spain)

=== Second leg ===
8 December 1993
17:45

| Borussia Dortmund (Germany) | 1–0 | (Denmark) Brøndby |
|---|---|---|
| Zorc 28' | Report |

Westfalenstadion, Dortmund
Attendance: 37,815
Referee: Jim McCluskey (Scotland)

Borussia Dortmund won 2–1 on aggregate.

7 December 1993
21:00

| Deportivo La Coruña (Spain) | 0–1 | (Germany) Eintracht Frankfurt |
|---|---|---|
| | Report | Gaudino 17' |

Estadio Riazor, A Coruña
Attendance: 28,000
Referee: Kurt Röthlisberger (Switzerland)

Eintracht Frankfurt won 2–0 on aggregate.

7 December 1993
20:15

| Karlsruhe (Germany) | 3–0 | (France) Bordeaux |
|---|---|---|
| Schmitt 16', 75'; Kiriakov 65' | Report |

Wildparkstadion, Karlsruhe
Attendance: 25,378
Referee: Angelo Amendolia (Italy)

Karlsruhe won 3–1 on aggregate.

8 December 1993
16:45

| Tenerife (Spain) | 2–1 | (Italy) Juventus |
|---|---|---|
| Aguilera 37' del Solar 88' | Report | Möller 86' |

Estadio Heliodoro Rodríguez López, Santa Cruz de Tenerife
Attendance: 19,800
Referee: Sándor Puhl (Hungary)

Juventus won 4–2 on aggregate.

8 December 1993
15:00

| Inter Milan (Italy) | 1–0 | (England) Norwich City |
|---|---|---|
| Bergkamp 88' | Report |

San Siro, Milan
Attendance: 27,763
Referee: Václav Krondl (Czech Republic)

Inter Milan won 2–0 on aggregate.

7 December 1993
22:00

| Boavista (Portugal) | 2–0 | (Greece) OFI |
|---|---|---|
| Bertollazzi 25'; Nogueira 80' | Report |

Estádio do Bessa, Porto
Attendance: 2,083
Referee: Peter Mikkelsen (Denmark)

Boavista won 6–1 on aggregate.

7 December 1993
19:00

| Austria Salzburg | 3–0 (a.e.t.) | (Portugal) Sporting CP |
|---|---|---|
| Lainer 48'; Hütter 89'; Amerhauser 112' | Report |

Stadion Lehen, Salzburg
Attendance: 10,500
Referee: Mario van der Ende (Netherlands)

Austria Salzburg won 3–2 on aggregate.

8 December 1993
17:45

| Cagliari (Italy) | 2–0 | (Belgium) Mechelen |
|---|---|---|
| Firicano 14'; Allegri 80' | Report |

Stadio Sant'Elia, Cagliari
Attendance: 27,798
Referee: Aron Schmidhuber (Germany)

Cagliari won 5–1 on aggregate.

== Quarter-finals ==
| Team 1 | Agg. | Team 2 | 1st leg | 2nd leg |
|---|---|---|---|---|
| Boavista (Portugal) | 1–2 | (Germany) Karlsruhe | 1–1 | 0–1 |
| Borussia Dortmund (Germany) | 3–4 | (Italy) Inter Milan | 1–3 | 2–1 |
| Cagliari (Italy) | 3–1 | (Italy) Juventus | 1–0 | 2–1 |
| Austria Salzburg | 1–1 (5–4 p) | (Germany) Eintracht Frankfurt | 1–0 | 0–1 (a.e.t.) |

=== First leg ===
1 March 1994
19:30

| Borussia Dortmund (Germany) | 1–3 | (Italy) Inter Milan |
|---|---|---|
| Schulz 83' | Report | Jonk 33', 36'; Shalimov 90' |

Westfalenstadion, Dortmund
Attendance: 36,000
Referee: Mario van der Ende (Netherlands)

1 March 1994
20:30

| Cagliari (Italy) | 1–0 | (Italy) Juventus |
|---|---|---|
| Dely Valdés 60' | Report |

Stadio Sant'Elia, Cagliari
Attendance: 29,426
Referee: Peter Mikkelsen (Denmark)

2 March 1994
19:30

| Boavista (Portugal) | 1–1 | (Germany) Karlsruhe |
|---|---|---|
| Ricky 40' | Report | Wittwer 77' |

Estádio do Bessa, Porto
Attendance: 10,800
Referee: Gerd Grabher (Austria)

3 March 1994
20:20

| Austria Salzburg | 1–0 | (Germany) Eintracht Frankfurt |
|---|---|---|
| Hütter 33' | Report |

Ernst-Happel-Stadion, Vienna
Attendance: 42,000
Referee: Sergei Khusainov (Russia)

=== Second leg ===
15 March 1994
18:00

| Eintracht Frankfurt (Germany) | 1–0 (a.e.t.) | Austria Salzburg |
|---|---|---|
| Gaudino 21' | Report |
Penalties
| Bein (penalty scored); Reis (penalty scored); Gaudino (penalty missed); Furtok (penalty scored); Stein (penalty scored); Binz (penalty missed) | 4–5 | (penalty scored) Lainer; (penalty scored) Jurčević; (penalty missed) Feiersinger; (penalty scored) Hütter; (penalty scored) Pfeifenberger; (penalty scored) Konrad |

Waldstadion, Frankfurt
Attendance: 26,000
Referee: David Elleray (England)

1–1 on aggregate; Austria Salzburg won 5–4 on penalties.

15 March 1994
20:30

| Juventus (Italy) | 1–2 | (Italy) Cagliari |
|---|---|---|
| D. Baggio 23' | Report | Firicano 33'; Oliveira 61' |

Stadio Delle Alpi, Turin
Attendance: 32,933
Referee: Ryszard Wójcik (Poland)

Cagliari won 3–1 on aggregate.

16 March 1994
17:45

| Karlsruhe (Germany) | 1–0 | (Portugal) Boavista |
|---|---|---|
| Rolff 35' | Report |

Wildparkstadion, Karlsruhe
Attendance: 18,900
Referee: Ion Crăciunescu (Romania)

Karlsruhe won 2–1 on aggregate.

17 March 1994
20:30

| Inter Milan (Italy) | 1–2 | (Germany) Borussia Dortmund |
|---|---|---|
| Manicone 80' | Report | Zorc 38'; Ricken 47' |

San Siro, Milan
Attendance: 28,989
Referee: Michel Piraux (Belgium)

Inter Milan won 4–3 on aggregate.

== Semi-finals ==
| Team 1 | Agg. | Team 2 | 1st leg | 2nd leg |
|---|---|---|---|---|
| Cagliari (Italy) | 3–5 | (Italy) Inter Milan | 3–2 | 0–3 |
| Austria Salzburg | 1–1 (a) | (Germany) Karlsruhe | 0–0 | 1–1 |

=== First leg ===
29 March 1994
20:20

| Austria Salzburg | 0–0 | (Germany) Karlsruhe |
|---|---|---|
| | Report |

Ernst-Happel-Stadion, Vienna
Attendance: 47,800
Referee: Vassilios Nikakis (Greece)

30 March 1994
18:30

| Cagliari (Italy) | 3–2 | (Italy) Inter Milan |
|---|---|---|
| Oliveira 11'; Criniti 81'; Pancaro 86' | Report | Fontolan 6'; Sosa 61' |

Stadio Sant'Elia, Cagliari
Attendance: 32,543
Referee: Antonio López Nieto (Spain)

=== Second leg ===
12 April 1994
20:15

| Karlsruhe (Germany) | 1–1 | Austria Salzburg |
|---|---|---|
| Krieg 54' | Report | Stadler 12' |

Wildparkstadion, Karlsruhe
Attendance: 21,139
Referee: Frans Van Den Wijngaert (Belgium)

1–1 on aggregate; Austria Salzburg won on away goals.

12 April 1994
20:30

| Inter Milan (Italy) | 3–0 | (Italy) Cagliari |
|---|---|---|
| Bergkamp 37' (pen.); Berti 54'; Jonk 63' | Report |

San Siro, Milan
Attendance: 58,858
Referee: Philip Don (England)

Inter Milan won 5–3 on aggregate.

== Final ==
=== First leg ===
26 April 1994
20:30

| Austria Salzburg | 0–1 | (Italy) Inter Milan |
|---|---|---|
| | Report | Berti 35' |

Ernst-Happel-Stadion, Vienna
Attendance: 47,500
Referee: Kim Milton Nielsen (Denmark)

=== Second leg ===
11 May 1994
20:30

| Inter Milan (Italy) | 1–0 | Austria Salzburg |
|---|---|---|
| Jonk 62' | Report |

San Siro, Milan
Attendance: 80,326
Referee: Jim McCluskey (Scotland)

Inter Milan won 2–0 on aggregate.

== Top goalscorers ==
1993–94 UEFA Cup top goalscorers
| Rank | Player | Team | Goals |
|---|---|---|---|
| 1 | (Netherlands) Dennis Bergkamp | (Italy) Inter Milan | 8 |
| 1 | (Germany) Edgar Schmitt | (Germany) Karlsruhe | 8 |
| 3 | (Denmark) Bent Christensen | (Greece) Olympiacos | 6 |
| 4 | (Brazil) Artur | (Portugal) Boavista | 5 |
| 4 | (Norway) Geir Frigård | (Norway) Kongsvinger | 5 |
| 4 | (Netherlands) Wim Jonk | (Italy) Inter Milan | 5 |
| 4 | (Nigeria) Ricky | (Portugal) Boavista | 5 |
| 8 | (Portugal) Jorge Cadete | (Portugal) Sporting CP | 4 |
| 8 | (Switzerland) Stéphane Chapuisat | (Germany) Borussia Dortmund | 4 |
| 8 | (Hungary) Dénes Eszenyi | (Belgium) Mechelen | 4 |
| 8 | (Denmark) Jesper Kristensen | (Denmark) Brøndby | 4 |
| 8 | (Finland) Ismo Lius | (Finland) Kuusysi | 4 |
| 8 | (Belgium) Luís Oliveira | (Italy) Cagliari | 4 |

== See also ==
- 1993–94 UEFA Champions League
- 1993–94 UEFA Cup Winners' Cup
