= 1992–93 Maltese Premier League =

Maltese Premier League
- Season: 1992–93
- Champions: Floriana (25th title)
- Relegated: St. George's; Mellieha S.C.
- UEFA Champions League: Floriana
- UEFA Cup: Valletta
- European Cup Winners' Cup: Sliema Wanderers
- Matches played: 90
- Goals scored: 311 (3.46 per match)
- Top goalscorer: Karl Zacchau (22)

The 1992–93 Maltese Premier League was the 13th season of the Maltese Premier League, and the 78th season of top-tier football in Malta. It was contested by 10 teams, and Floriana F.C. won the championship.

== Teams ==
Locations of the 1992–93 Maltese Premier League teams

== League standings ==
| Pos | Team | Pld | W | D | L | GF | GA | GD | Pts | Qualification |
|---|---|---|---|---|---|---|---|---|---|---|
| 1 | Floriana F.C. (C) | 18 | 13 | 3 | 2 | 35 | 13 | +22 | 29 | Qualification for the UEFA Champions League |
| 2 | Hamrun Spartans F.C. | 18 | 11 | 2 | 5 | 46 | 23 | +23 | 24 | |
| 3 | Valletta F.C. | 18 | 10 | 4 | 4 | 32 | 23 | +9 | 24 | Qualification for the UEFA Cup |
| 4 | St. Andrews F.C. | 18 | 9 | 4 | 5 | 43 | 30 | +13 | 22 | |
| 5 | Hibernians F.C. | 18 | 9 | 3 | 6 | 45 | 30 | +15 | 21 | |
| 6 | Rabat Ajax F.C. | 18 | 6 | 3 | 9 | 30 | 38 | −8 | 15 | |
| 7 | Sliema Wanderers F.C. | 18 | 6 | 3 | 9 | 26 | 31 | −5 | 15 | Qualification for the European Cup Winners' Cup (Note: Sliema Wanderers qualified for the Cup Winners' Cup as Maltese FA Trophy Runners-up, as winners Floriana already qualified for the UEFA Champions League.) |
| 8 | Birkirkara F.C. | 18 | 5 | 3 | 10 | 22 | 37 | −15 | 13 | |
| 9 | St. George's F.C. (R) | 18 | 3 | 4 | 11 | 18 | 44 | −26 | 10 | Relegation |
| 10 | Mellieha S.C. (R) | 18 | 2 | 3 | 13 | 14 | 42 | −28 | 7 | Relegation |

Source: rsssf.com
(C) Champions; (R) Relegated

== Results ==
| Home \ Away | BKR | FRN | HIB | ĦMR | MLL | RBT | SLM | STA | STG | VLT |
|---|---|---|---|---|---|---|---|---|---|---|
| Birkirkara | — | 1–5 | 2–1 | 1–4 | 1–0 | 0–0 | 2–1 | 0–2 | 1–1 | 1–3 |
| Floriana | 1–0 | — | 1–0 | 0–0 | 3–0 | 3–1 | 4–2 | 2–2 | 2–0 | 2–1 |
| Hibernians | 4–2 | 1–2 | — | 5–0 | 1–0 | 3–1 | 0–1 | 2–4 | 4–2 | 2–2 |
| Ħamrun Spartans | 4–1 | 1–0 | 2–4 | — | 1–1 | 2–0 | 2–1 | 1–0 | 3–0 | 1–2 |
| Mellieħa | 1–2 | 1–1 | 0–3 | 0–1 | — | 2–4 | 0–2 | 2–5 | 1–1 | 0–6 |
| Rabat Ajax | 1–1 | 0–3 | 2–5 | 4–2 | 2–1 | — | 3–1 | 3–5 | 1–0 | 0–4 |
| Sliema Wanderers | 2–1 | 1–3 | 1–1 | 1–1 | 1–2 | 1–0 | — | 1–2 | 5–2 | 1–3 |
| St. Andrews | 2–3 | 2–1 | 3–3 | 0–3 | 6–1 | 1–1 | 1–2 | — | 0–0 | 2–1 |
| St. George's | 2–1 | 0–1 | 1–5 | 1–2 | 1–0 | 0–7 | 2–2 | 3–2 | — | 1–3 |
| Valletta | 3–2 | 0–1 | 4–1 | 2–2 | 1–2 | 4–0 | 2–0 | 1–4 | 4–1 | — |

Legend: Blue = home team win; Yellow = draw; Red = away team win.

== Top goalscorers ==
| Rank | Player | Club | Goals |
|---|---|---|---|
| 1 | (Denmark) Karl Zacchau | Hibernians | 22 |
| 2 | (Malta) Stefan Sultana | Ħamrun Spartans | 18 |
| 3 | (Malta) Alex Busuttil | St. Andrews | 13 |
| 4 | (Republic of Ireland) Brian Crawley | Floriana | 12 |
| 5 | (Bulgaria) Alexei Ivanov | Birkirkara | 11 |
| 6 | (Hungary) György Handel | St. Andrews | 10 |
| 7 | (Argentina) Cesar Paiber | Ħamrun Spartans | 9 |
| 7 | (Malta) Hubert Suda | Sliema Wanderers | 9 |
| 7 | (Malta) Joe Zarb | Valletta | 9 |
| 10 | (Malta) Brian Said | St. Andrews | 8 |
