= 1993–94 Maltese Premier League =

Maltese Premier League
- Season: 1993–94
- Champions: Hibernians (7th title)
- Relegated: St. Andrews; Rabat Ajax; Mqabba Ħajduks
- UEFA Cup: Hibernians; Valletta
- UEFA Cup Winners' Cup: Floriana
- Matches played: 90
- Goals scored: 251 (2.79 per match)
- Top goalscorer: Joe Zarb; Karl Zacchau (17)

The 1993–94 Maltese Premier League was the 14th season of the Maltese Premier League, and the 79th season of top-tier football in Malta. It was contested by 10 teams, and Hibernians F.C. won the championship.

== Teams ==
Locations of the 1993–94 Maltese Premier League teams

== League standings ==
Pos	Team	Pld	W	D	L	GF	GA	GD	Pts	Qualification
1	Hibernians (C)	18	14	3	1	48	15	+33	31	Qualification for the UEFA Cup
2	Floriana	18	12	4	2	29	7	+22	28	Qualification for the UEFA Cup Winners' Cup (Note: Floriana qualified for the Cup Winners' Cup as Maltese FA Trophy Winners)
3	Valletta	18	12	3	3	42	17	+25	27	Qualification for the UEFA Cup
4	Ħamrun Spartans	18	8	9	1	35	10	+25	25	
5	Sliema Wanderers	18	7	5	6	23	14	+9	19	
6	Żurrieq	18	5	4	9	18	29	−11	14	
7	St. Andrews (Note: St. Andrews Relegated to the Third Division due to the refresh the team) (R)	18	5	3	10	18	30	−12	13	Relegation
8	Birkirkara	18	6	0	12	19	36	−17	12	
9	Rabat Ajax (R)	18	2	6	10	16	38	−22	10	Relegation
10	Mqabba Ħajduks (R)	18	0	1	17	3	55	−52	1	Relegation

Source: rsssf.com
(C) Champions; (R) Relegated

== Results ==
Home \ Away	BKR	FRN	HIB	ĦMR	MQB	RBT	SLM	STA	VLT	ŻRQ
Birkirkara	—	0–2	0–2	0–1	2–0	3–0	0–1	1–2	1–4	0–2
Floriana	1–0	—	1–3	0–0	2–0	3–0	3–0	4–1	3–0	2–0
Hibernians	6–2	3–1	—	0–3	2–0	6–0	1–0	2–0	1–0	3–0
Ħamrun Spartans	3–0	0–0	0–0	—	2–0	1–1	1–1	1–1	1–2	4–1
Mqabba	0–3	0–1	0–5	0–8	—	2–4	0–4	0–1	0–4	1–5
Rabat Ajax	1–2	0–3	1–1	2–2	0–0	—	0–2	0–0	1–3	1–0
Sliema Wanderers	2–0	0–0	0–2	0–3	6–0	1–1	—	0–1	1–2	3–0
St. Andrews	0–1	0–1	2–5	0–3	3–0	5–3	0–2	—	0–2	0–0
Valletta	8–0	0–0	3–4	1–1	2–0	2–0	0–0	4–2	—	3–2
Żurrieq	1–4	0–2	2–2	1–1	1–0	2–1	0–0	1–0	0–2	—

Legend: Blue = home team win; Yellow = draw; Red = away team win.

== Top goalscorers ==
Rank	Player	Club	Goals
1	(Malta) Joe Zarb	Valletta	17
1	(Denmark) Karl Zacchau	Hibernians	17
3	(Malta) Stefan Sultana	Ħamrun Spartans	13
4	(Malta) Gilbert Agius	Valletta	11
5	(England) George Lawrence	Hibernians	10
6	(England) John Muir	Sliema Wanderers	8
7	(England) Jason Kabia	Valletta	7
8	(Federal Republic of Yugoslavia) Vesko Petrović	Rabat Ajax	6
8	(Malta) Paul Zammit	Rabat Ajax	6
8	(Malta) Hubert Suda	Sliema Wanderers	6
