= Karl Zachhau =

Danish footballer

Personal information
- Full name: Karl Zachhau
- Date of birth: 30 October 1962 (age 63)
- Place of birth: Kastrup, Denmark
- Position: Striker

Youth career
- Freja Randers

Senior career*
Years	Team	Apps	(Gls)
1983-1984	Rochdale		
1984	Hibernians	3	(0)
1985	St. Patrick	2	(0)
1985	Walthamstow Avenue		
1986-1987	Yeovil Town		
1989	Bishop's Stortford		
1990	Aylesbury United	9	(1)
- Għargħur
1991–1992	Żurrieq F.C.	18	(9)
1992–1994	Hibernians	32	(39)
1994	Birkirkara Luxol	5	(2)
1994–1996	Nadur Youngsters	26	(39)
1996	Lija Athletic	2	(0)
1998	Hibernians	6	(1)
1999	Mosta	11	(4)
- Siġġiewi
- * Club domestic league appearances and goals

Karl Zachhau (born 30 October 1962) also known as Carl Zacchau is a retired footballer, who played a large part of his career in Malta as a striker.

A prolific striker, Zachhau was voted Malta Footballer of the Month in September 1992 and was a two times top goalscorer in the Maltese Premier League. He also played for Rochdale, Walthamstow Avenue, Bishop's Stortford, Aylesbury United and Yeovil Town in England.

He reportedly declined an offer to change citizenship to Maltese and start playing for their national team. Outside of football he was a hairdresser.

== Honours ==
Hibernians

- Maltese Premier League: 1993–94
- Top goalscorer: 1992–93, 1993–94
