= Estádio Municipal Dr. Alves Vieira =

Football stadium in Torres Novas, Portugal

- Interactive map of Estádio Municipal Dr. Alves Vieira
- Former names: Estádio Municipal de Torres Novas
- Location: Torres Novas, Portugal
- Coordinates: 39°29′16.88″N 8°32′40.86″W
- Owner: Municipality of Torres Novas
- Operator: Municipality of Torres Novas
- Capacity: 11,500
- Surface: Grass
- Field size: 105 x 68 m

Construction
- Built: 1969; 57 years ago
- Opened: 7 December 1969
- Architect: Branco Ló

Tenant
- C.D. Torres Novas

The Estádio Municipal Dr. Alves Vieira is a multi-use stadium in Torres Novas, Portugal.

It was built in 1969 to replace the then home ground of C.D. Torres Novas, the small Almonda Parque, which had hosted the club’s official matches for almost 25 years.

The facility includes a natural grass football pitch, a four-lane cinder athletics track, an area for throwing events (shot put and javelin) and a sandpit for the long jump and triple jump. It has a seating capacity of around 11,500.

It is named in honour of António Alves Vieira, a renowned regional doctor, whose statue stands in the Jardim das Rosas.

On 15 January 1992, it hosted a friendly match, which ended in a 0–0 draw, between the Portuguese national team and the Spanish national football team.

This stadium is notable for having hosted Cristiano Ronaldo international debut for Portugal’s Under-15s on 24 February 2001, in a match against South Africa that ended 2–1, in which he scored the winning goal, his first for the national team at any level.

In 2025, plans were approved to refurbish the stadium, specifically regarding the size of the pitch and its lighting to meet technical requirements, as well as the installation of a synthetic-surface athletics track with six lanes.

== Portugal national team matches ==
The following national team matches were held in the stadium.

#	Date	Score	Opponent	Competition
1.	15 January 1992	0–0	Spain	Friendly

== See also ==
- List of football stadiums in Portugal
