= Oliver Camenzind =

Swiss footballer (born 1972)

Personal information
- Date of birth: 18 January 1972 (age 54)
- Position: Defender

Senior career*
| Years | Team | Apps | (Gls) |
| 1991–1996 | FC Luzern | | |
| 1996–1997 | BSC Old Boys | | |
| 1997–1999 | FC Luzern | | |
- * Club domestic league appearances and goals

Oliver Camenzind (born 18 January 1972) is a retired Swiss football defender.
