= Viktor Dvirnyk =

Ukrainian footballer

Personal information
- Full name: Viktor Hennadiyovych Dvirnyk
- Date of birth: 28 February 1969 (age 57)
- Place of birth: Kyiv, Ukraine
- Height: 1.85 m (6 ft 1 in)
- Position: Forward

Senior career*
Years	Team	Apps	(Gls)
1986–1989	Dynamo Kyiv	0	(0)
1989	→ Dynamo Bila Tserkva (loan)	10	(0)
1989	Sudnobudivnyk Mykolaiv	26	(1)
1990–1991	Chemlon Humenné		(4)
1990–1992	Inter Slovnaft Bratislava	45	(22)
1992–1994	Sparta Prague	41	(13)
1994–1995	Bohemians Praha	15	(10)
1995	Inter Slovnaft Bratislava	2	(0)
1995–1996	AEL	13	(1)
1996–1997	Bohemians Praha	14	(2)
1997	Český Brod		(5)
1997–1999	Mladost 127 Suhopolje	16	(3)
1999–2000	Istra	17	(1)
- * Club domestic league appearances and goals

Viktor Hennadiyovych Dvirnyk (born 28 February 1969) is a Ukrainian retired professional footballer who played for several clubs in Europe.

== Club career ==
Dvirnyk played for Sparta Prague and Bohemians 1905 in the Czech Gambrinus liga, a brief spell in the Slovak Premier League during the 1994–95 season and played for AEL in the Super League Greece during the 1995–96 season. He finished his career in the Croatian First League with NK Mladost 127 and NK Istra.
