= Roman Vonášek =

Czech footballer

Personal information
- Date of birth: 8 July 1968 (age 58)
- Place of birth: Strakonice, Czechoslovakia
- Position: Midfielder

Youth career
- 1979–1982: Sokol Bělčice
- 1982–1984: TJ Blatná
- 1984–1987: Spartak Písek
- 1987: RH České Budějovice
- 1987–1988: RH Cheb

Senior career*
Years	Team	Apps	(Gls)
1988–1989	RH Nýrsko		
1989–1991	Škoda Plzeň		
1992–1996	Sparta Prague	102	(13)
1996–2003	Lokeren	169	(30)
2003	→ Cercle Brugge (loan)	12	(4)
2003–2004	KV Mechelen		
2004–2005	OFS Klatovy		

International career
1994–1999	Czech Republic	8	(0)
Medal record
AC Sparta Prague
Winner	Gambrinus liga	1993–94
Winner	Gambrinus liga	1994–95
- * Club domestic league appearances and goals

Roman Vonášek (born 8 July 1968) is a Czech former football player.

== Club career ==
During his junior years he played for Sokol Bělčice, TJ Blatná, Spartak Písek, RH České Budějovice and RH Cheb.

He joined KSC Lokeren from Sparta Prague in summer 1996 and spent there six and a half years before leaving for Brugge at the age of 34. In 2007, he joined FC Viktoria Plzeň in a non-playing capacity.

== International career ==
=== Stats ===
Czech Republic national team
Year	Apps	Goals
1994	1	0
1998	6	0
1999	1	0
Total	8	0
