= Arnfinn Engerbakk =

Norwegian footballer and manager (born 1964)

Personal information
- Date of birth: 22 March 1964 (age 62)
- Position: Midfielder

Senior career*
Years	Team	Apps	(Gls)
–1985	Nordre Trysil		
1986–1997	Kongsvinger	221	(35)
1999	Vinger		

International career
1987	Norway	4	(0)

Managerial career
- Raumnes & Årnes
- * Club domestic league appearances and goals

Arnfinn Engerbakk (born 22 March 1964) is a retired Norwegian football midfielder. He represented the Norway national team on four occasions in 1987.

He started his career in Nordre Trysil IL, and signed for Kongsvinger IL just after the 1985 season. He was ever-present in the Norwegian Premier League in his first season, and became a club legend. By late 1997 he had played in every position except for goalkeeper, and therefore got to tend the goal for a few minutes during his final home match. He did not concede any goals. He retired after the season.

In 1999, he made a comeback for the newly established, low-level club Vinger FK. He has later coached Raumnes & Årnes IL.
