= Alex Busuttil =

Maltese footballer (born 1969)

Personal information
- Date of birth: 3 January 1969 (age 57)
- Position: Striker

Senior career*
Years	Team	Apps	(Gls)
1987–1991	Valletta	39	(1)
1991–1995	Luxol St. Andrews	64	(24)
1995–1998	Hibernians	37	(3)
Total		140	(28)

International career
1994	Malta	2	(0)
- * Club domestic league appearances and goals

Alex Busuttil (born 3 January 1969) is a Maltese retired footballer.

== Club career ==
The long-haired Busuttil most notably played for Luxol St. Andrews and was voted Malta Premier League player of the month in November 1992.

== International career ==
Busuttil made his debut for Malta in a July 1994 friendly match away against Armenia and earned his second and final cap in another friendly, three days later against Georgia.

== Honours ==
Valletta

- Maltese Premier League: 1990
- Maltese FA Trophy: 1991

Hibernians

- Maltese FA Trophy: 1998
