= Torben Christensen =

Danish footballer (born 1963)

Personal information
- Date of birth: 14 July 1963 (age 63)
- Place of birth: Tårs, Denmark
- Position: Midfielder

Senior career*
Years	Team	Apps	(Gls)
1983–1988	Ikast FS		
1988–1989	St. Gallen	9	(0)
1989–1994	AGF		
1994–1995	Ikast FS		

International career
1984–1985	Denmark	3	(0)
- * Club domestic league appearances and goals

Torben Christensen (born 14 July 1963) is a Danish former footballer who played as a midfielder. He made three appearances for the Denmark national team from 1984 to 1985.
