= Gerald Bacher =

Austrian footballer and manager (born 1968)

Personal information
- Date of birth: 8 October 1968 (age 58)
- Place of birth: Villach, Austria
- Height: 1.77 m (5 ft 10 in)
- Position: Midfielder

Team information
- Current team: Wolfsberger AC (youth coach)

Senior career*
| Years | Team | Apps | (Gls) |
| 1987–1996 | Admira Wacker | 227 | (9) |
| 1996–1997 | FC Linz | 22 | (0) |
| 1997–1998 | Iraklis | 7 | (0) |
| 1998–2000 | SV Spittal/Drau | 43 | (1) |
| 2000–2001 | BSV Bad Bleiberg | 13 | (1) |
| 2002–2003 | SC Landskron | | |

International career
| 1988–1989 | Austria U21 | 12 | (0) |

Managerial career
- 2010–2013: SV Sachsenburg
- 2011–2014: AKA Kärnten (youth)
- 2015–2016: SV Treffen
- 2018: Villacher SV (youth)
- 2020–2021: LAZ Spittal/Paternion
- 2023–: Wolfsberger AC (youth)
- * Club domestic league appearances and goals

Gerald Bacher (born 8 October 1968) is an Austrian football coach and former player who played as a midfielder. He is the current assistant coach of Wolfsberger AC's under-16 team.

== Coaching career ==
Bacher started his coaching career with SV Sachsenburg in 2010 after retiring as a player. He then had multiple stints as coach of lower-level clubs, including SV Treffen between 2015 and 2016. In 2023, Bacher was appointed assistant coach for Wolfsberger AC's under-16 team.
