= Joe Zarb =

Maltese footballer

Personal information
- Full name: Joseph Zarb
- Date of birth: 19 November 1964 (age 61)
- Place of birth: Żabbar, Malta
- Position: Striker

Youth career
- Cospicua St Joseph’s

Senior career*
Years	Team	Apps	(Gls)
1980–1983	St. George's	25	(7)
1984–1988	Ħamrun Spartans	38	(8)
1986	→ St. George's (loan)	6	(2)
1988–1999	Valletta	215	(126)
1999–2000	Gozo	16	(0)
2000–2001	Żurrieq	6	(2)
Total		306	(145)

International career
1989–1994	Malta	10	(1)
- * Club domestic league appearances and goals

Joe Zarb (born 19 November 1964) is a Maltese retired football striker.

== Club career ==
Born in Żabbar and nicknamed Brimba (Spider), Zarb netted 140 league goals in 281 matches for St. George's, Ħamrun Spartans and Valletta and was the Maltese Premier League top goalscorer 4 times.

== International career ==
He made his debut for Malta in an October 1989 friendly match against Austria, in which he also scored, and earned a total of 10 caps, scoring 1 goal. His final international was a March 1994 friendly against Slovakia.

=== International goal ===
Scores and results list Malta's goal tally first.

No	Date	Venue	Opponent	Score	Result	Competition
1.	4 October 1989	National Stadium, Ta' Qali, Malta	Austria	1–0	1–2	Friendly match
